= 1997–98 Bristol City F.C. season =

Bristol City
1997–98 season
- Chairman: Scott Davidson
- Manager: John Ward
- Stadium: Ashton Gate
- Second Division: 2nd (promoted)
- FA Cup: Second round
- League Cup: Second round
- Auto Windscreens Shield: Quarter finals
- Top goalscorer: League: Goater (16); All: Goater (17)
- Average home league attendance: 11,846

During the 1997–98 English football season, Bristol City F.C. competed in the Football League Second Division.

== Season summary ==
In the 1997–98 season, Bristol City achieved promotion to Division One, which was confirmed on 10 April 1998 after Grimsby failed to win at Wycombe and can only manage a 1–1 draw. It was also thoroughly deserved as they were in the top two since the beginning of November and also going on a brilliant run of form midway through the season which saw them lose only one from 21 league games and winning eight consecutive games during that run.

== Final league table ==
Pos	Team	Pld	W	D	L	GF	GA	GD	Pts	Promotion or relegation
1	Watford (C, P)	46	24	16	6	67	41	+26	88	Promotion to the First Division
2	Bristol City (P)	46	25	10	11	69	39	+30	85	Promotion to the First Division
3	Grimsby Town (O, P)	46	19	15	12	55	37	+18	72	Qualification for the Second Division play-offs
4	Northampton Town	46	18	17	11	52	37	+15	71	Qualification for the Second Division play-offs
5	Bristol Rovers	46	20	10	16	70	64	+6	70	Qualification for the Second Division play-offs

Rules for classification: In the Football League goals scored (GF) takes precedence over goal difference (GD).
(C) Champions; (O) Play-off winners; (P) Promoted

== Results ==
Bristol City's score comes first

=== Legend ===
Win	Draw	Loss

=== Football League Second Division ===
Date	Opponent	Venue	Result	Attendance	Scorers
9 August 1997	Grimsby Town	A	1–1	6,220	Torpey
16 August 1997	Blackpool	H	2–0	9,043	Cramb, Goater
23 August 1997	Northampton Town	A	1–2	6,217	Cramb
30 August 1997	Wigan Athletic	H	3–0	9,255	Goater (3, 1 pen)
2 September 1997	Fulham	H	0–2	10,293	
13 September 1997	Wrexham	A	1–2	3,251	Goater
20 September 1997	Bournemouth	H	1–1	8,330	Goater
27 September 1997	Luton Town	H	3–0	8,509	Bell (pen), Torpey (2)
4 October 1997	Gillingham	A	0–2	6,277	
11 October 1997	Southend United	A	2–0	3,273	Bell, Hails (own goal)
17 October 1997	York City	H	2–1	9,568	Cramb, Torpey
21 October 1997	Preston North End	H	2–1	9,039	Bell (pen), Goodridge
25 October 1997	Walsall	A	0–0	4,618	
29 October 1997	Millwall	A	2–0	7,026	Torpey, Locke
1 November 1997	Oldham Athletic	H	1–0	10,221	Bell (pen)
4 November 1997	Bristol Rovers	A	2–1	7,552	Goater (2)
8 November 1997	Brentford	A	4–1	6,183	Torpey, Doherty (2), Goater
18 November 1997	Plymouth Argyle	H	2–1	10,867	Bell (2)
22 November 1997	Wycombe Wanderers	H	3–1	11,129	Hewlett (2), Torpey
29 November 1997	Carlisle United	A	3–0	5,044	Goater (2), Goodridge
2 December 1997	Burnley	H	3–1	11,136	Goodridge (2), Bell (pen)
13 December 1997	Watford	A	1–1	16,072	Goater
20 December 1997	Chesterfield	H	1–0	11,792	Bell (pen)
26 December 1997	Millwall	H	4–1	16,128	Cramb, Edwards, Tinnion, Taylor
28 December 1997	Fulham	A	0–1	13,273	
10 January 1998	Grimsby Town	H	4–1	12,567	Cramb (2), Taylor, Goater
17 January 1998	Wigan Athletic	A	3–0	5,078	Doherty, Tinnion, Goater
24 January 1998	Northampton Town	H	0–0	14,753	
31 January 1998	Wrexham	H	1–1	11,741	Goater
3 February 1998	Blackpool	A	2–2	3,724	Hewlett (2)
7 February 1998	Bournemouth	A	0–1	6,623	
14 February 1998	Gillingham	H	0–2	11,781	
21 February 1998	Luton Town	A	0–0	6,405	
24 February 1998	York City	A	1–0	3,770	Bell (pen)
28 February 1998	Southend United	H	1–0	12,049	Cramb
3 March 1998	Brentford	H	2–2	10,398	Torpey, Cockerill (own goal)
14 March 1998	Bristol Rovers	H	2–0	17,086	Bell (pen), Goater
21 March 1998	Plymouth Argyle	A	0–2	7,622	
28 March 1998	Wycombe Wanderers	A	2–1	6,326	Cramb (2)
31 March 1998	Oldham Athletic	A	2–1	4,543	Goodridge, Roberts
4 April 1998	Carlisle United	H	1–0	12,578	Goodridge
11 April 1998	Burnley	A	0–1	10,600	
13 April 1998	Watford	H	1–1	19,141	Edwards
18 April 1998	Chesterfield	A	0–1	5,085	
25 April 1998	Walsall	H	2–1	15,059	Owers, Tinnion
2 May 1998	Preston North End	A	1–2	12,067	McCarthy

=== FA Cup ===
Round	Date	Opponent	Venue	Result	Attendance	Goalscorers
R1	15 November 1997	Millwall	H	1–0	8,413	Taylor
R2	7 December 1997	Bournemouth	A	1–3	5,687	Cramb

=== League Cup ===
Round	Date	Opponent	Venue	Result	Attendance	Goalscorers
R1 1st Leg	12 August 1997	Bristol Rovers	H	0–0	9,341	
R1 2nd Leg	26 August 1997	Bristol Rovers	A	2–1 (won 2–1 on agg)	5,872	Taylor, Bent
R2 1st Leg	17 September 1997	Leeds United	A	1–3	8,806	Goater
R2 2nd Leg	30 September 1997	Leeds United	H	2–1 (lost 3–4 on agg)	10,857	Goodridge, Taylor

=== Football League Trophy ===
Round	Date	Opponent	Venue	Result	Attendance	Goalscorers
SR2	6 January 1998	Millwall	H	1–0	2,557	Locke
SQF	27 January 1998	Bournemouth	A	0–1	2,124	

== Squad ==
Note: Flags indicate national team as defined under FIFA eligibility rules; some limited exceptions apply. Players may hold more than one non-FIFA nationality.

No.	Pos.	Nation	Player
-	GK	(England) ENG	Keith Welch
-	GK	(England) ENG	Stuart Naylor
-	GK	(England) ENG	Steve Phillips
-	DF	(England) ENG	Michael Bell
-	DF	(England) ENG	Shaun Taylor
-	DF	(England) ENG	Adam Locke
-	DF	(Scotland) SCO	Louis Carey
-	DF	(Wales) WAL	Rob Edwards
-	DF	(England) ENG	Sean Dyche
-	DF	(Scotland) SCO	Scott Paterson
-	DF	(Canada) CAN	Jim Brennan
-	DF	(Sweden) SWE	Mark Shail
-	DF	(England) ENG	Kevin Langan
-	DF	(Scotland) SCO	Andy Jordan
-	MF	(England) ENG	Brian Tinnion
-	MF	(England) ENG	Matthew Hewlett
-	MF	(Northern Ireland) NIR	Tommy Doherty

No.	Pos.	Nation	Player
-	MF	(England) ENG	Gary Owers
-	MF	(Scotland) SCO	Scott Murray
-	MF	(England) ENG	Paul Tisdale
-	MF	(Libya) LBY	Jehad Muntasser
-	FW	(Scotland) SCO	Colin Cramb
-	FW	(Bermuda) BER	Shaun Goater
-	FW	(Barbados) BRB	Gregory Goodridge
-	FW	(England) ENG	Steve Torpey
-	FW	(Wales) WAL	Sean McCarthy (on loan from Oldham Athletic)
-	FW	(Norway) NOR	Stig Johansen (on loan from Southampton)
-	FW	(Grenada) GRN	Jason Roberts (on loan from Wolves)
-	FW	(England) ENG	Dominic Barclay
-	FW	(England) ENG	Junior Bent
-	FW	(England) ENG	Dwayne Plummer
