= 1999–2000 Bristol City F.C. season =

Bristol City
1999–2000 season
- Manager: Tony Pulis (until January); Tony Fawthrop
- Football League Second Division: 9th
- FA Cup: Third round
- League Cup: Second round
- Football League Trophy: Runner-up
- Top goalscorer: Tony Thorpe (17)

During the 1999–2000 English football season, Bristol City F.C. competed in the Football League Second Division where they finished in 9th position. They also reached the final of the Football League Trophy losing 2–1 to Stoke City.

== Season summary ==
Tony Pulis was appointed as manager for City's return to Division Two, but a mediocre first half of the season (including failing to win a single league game in October or November) saw the alarming possibility of a second successive relegation battle, rather than a promotion challenge. Just after the turn of the year, Pulis left to become manager of Portsmouth, and coach Tony Fawthrop took over for the remainder of the season, assisted by Leroy Rosenior. A much-improved second half of the season saw a respectable 9th place finish, and while Fawthrop initially accepted the manager's job on a permanent basis at the end of the season, he changed his mind and opted to focus on his business interests outside of football. Danny Wilson was therefore recruited as the manager to lead them into the next season.

== Final league table ==
Pos	Team	Pld	W	D	L	GF	GA	GD	Pts
7	Bristol Rovers	46	23	11	12	69	45	+24	80
8	Notts County	46	18	11	17	61	55	+6	65
9	Bristol City	46	15	19	12	59	57	+2	64
10	Reading	46	16	14	16	57	63	−6	62
11	Wrexham	46	17	11	18	52	61	−9	62

Rules for classification: 1) Points; 2) Goal difference; 3) Goals scored

== Results ==
Bristol City's score comes first

=== Legend ===
Win	Draw	Loss

=== Football League Division Two ===
Match	Date	Opponent	Venue	Result	Attendance	Scorers
1	7 August 1999	Reading	A	1–2	13,348	Tinnion 77'
2	14 August 1999	Bournemouth	H	3–1	9,758	Akinbiyi 24', 44', Brennan 47'
3	14 August 1999	Wigan Athletic	A	1–2	7,103	Thorpe 72' (pen)
4	28 August 1999	Bury	H	1–1	9,537	Taylor 90'
5	4 September 1999	Blackpool	H	5–2	8,439	Bell 49', Thorpe 70', 79', Hutchings 83', Brennan 89'
6	11 September 1999	Millwall	H	0–0	9,893	
7	18 September 1999	Scunthorpe United	A	2–1	4,542	Jones 79', Taylor 84'
8	25 September 1999	Burnley	H	0–0	11,510	
9	2 October 1999	Oxford United	A	0–3	6,638	
10	9 October 1999	Preston North End	A	0–1	10,042	
11	17 October 1999	Bristol Rovers	H	0–0	16,011	
12	19 October 1999	Colchester United	H	1–1	7,777	Tinnion 34'
13	23 October 1999	Burnley	A	0–2	10,175	
14	2 November 1999	Gillingham	A	0–3	6,892	
15	6 November 1999	Cambridge United	H	1–1	8,646	Jones 35'
16	14 November 1999	Stoke City	A	1–1	10,775	Tinnion 85'
17	23 November 1999	Oldham Athletic	H	1–1	8,214	Beadle 39'
18	27 November 1999	Notts County	A	4–4	5,374	Bell 20', 75', Testemitanu 61', Beadle 64'
19	4 December 1999	Reading	H	3–1	8,936	Torpey 45', Taylor 50', Beadle 76'
20	7 December 1999	Chesterfield	A	2–0	2,254	Galloway 45' (o.g.), Testemitanu 61'
21	17 December 1999	Wycombe Wanderers	H	0–0	8,195	
22	26 December 1999	Brentford	A	1–2	6,942	Beadle 90'
23	28 December 1999	Luton Town	H	0–0	11,832	
24	3 January 2000	Wrexham	A	1–0	4,021	Taylor 70'
25	9 January 2000	Cardiff City	H	0–0	10,568	
26	15 January 2000	Bournemouth	A	3–2	5,425	Millen 31', Thorpe 61', 67'
27	22 January 2000	Wigan Athletic	H	0–0	10,758	
28	29 January 2000	Bury	A	0–0	3,435	
29	5 February 2000	Chesterfield	H	3–0	8,837	Thorpe 44', Murray 45', Beadle 75'
30	12 February 2000	Blackpool	A	2–1	5,066	Murray 21', Millen 48'
31	19 February 2000	Notts County	H	2–2	10,029	Holmes 35' (o.g.), Thorpe 43'
32	22 February 2000	Cardiff City	A	0–0	6,586	
33	26 February 2000	Scunthorpe United	H	2–1	9,897	Thorpe 18', Murray 40'
34	4 March 2000	Millwall	A	1–4	10,141	Meechan 45'
35	7 March 2000	Cambridge United	A	0–3	3,505	
36	11 March 2000	Gillingham	H	0–1	9,332	
37	18 March 2000	Oldham Athletic	A	1–1	4,808	Brown 76'
38	25 March 2000	Brentford	H	1–0	8,804	Murray 77'
39	28 March 2000	Stoke City	H	2–2	8,103	Thorpe 10', 78'
40	1 April 2000	Wycombe Wanderers	A	2–1	4,754	Thorpe 18', Spencer 66'
41	8 April 2000	Wrexham	H	4–0	8,639	Thorpe 53', 78', Beadle 62', Meechan 90'
42	18 April 2000	Luton Town	A	2–1	4,771	Murray 29', Bell 77'
43	22 April 2000	Bristol Rovers	A	0–2	10,805	
44	24 April 2000	Oxford United	H	2–2	9,046	Meechan 22', Brown 39'
45	29 April 2000	Colchester United	A	4–3	4,013	Murray 39', Meechan 63', Ferguson 71' (o.g.), Bell 84'
46	6 May 2000	Preston North End	H	0–2	11,160	

=== League Cup ===
Round	Date	Opponent	Venue	Result	Attendance	Scorers
R1 1st Leg	10 August 1999	Cambridge United	A	2–2	2,813	Hutchings 51', Mortimer 90'
R1 2nd Leg	24 August 1999	Cambridge United	H	2–1	5,352	Torpey 18', Thorpe 36'
R2 1st Leg	15 September 1999	Nottingham Forest	A	1–2	5,015	Jordan 13'
R2 2nd Leg	22 September 1999	Nottingham Forest	H	0–0	8,259	

=== FA Cup ===
Round	Date	Opponent	Venue	Result	Attendance	Scorers
R1	30 October 1999	Mansfield Town	H	3–2	5,411	Tinnion 44', 50', Murray 65'
R2	20 November 1999	Bournemouth	A	2–0	5,223	Murray 21', 53'
R3	11 December 1999	Sheffield Wednesday	A	0–1	11,644	

=== Football League Trophy ===
Round	Date	Opponent	Venue	Result	Attendance	Scorers
Southern R2	12 January 2000	Cheltenham Town	H	3–1	4,123	Holland 28', Goodridge 54', Beadle 90'
Southern Quarter Final	25 January 2000	Bournemouth	H	1–1 (4–1 pens)	4,291	Hewlett 16'
Southern Semi Final	15 February 2000	Reading	H	4–0	8,733	Beadle 35', Thorpe 39', 68', Murray 70'
Southern Final 1st leg	29 February 2000	Exeter City	H	4–0	12,742	Thorpe 4', Beadle 63', Murray 68', Burnell 75'
Southern Final 2nd leg	14 March 2000	Exeter City	A	1–1	2,929	Beadle 65'
Final	16 April 2000	Stoke City	N	1–2	75,057	Holland 74'

== Squad ==
Appearances for competitive matches only

Pos.	Name	League		FA Cup		League Cup		Football League Trophy		Total	
Pos.	Name	Apps	Goals	Apps	Goals	Apps	Goals	Apps	Goals	Apps	Goals
FW	(Nigeria) Ade Akinbiyi	3	2	0	0	1	0	0	0	4	2
DF	(England) Kevin Amankwaah	4(1)	0	0	0	0	0	0(1)	0	4(2)	0
DF	(England) Alex Ball	1	0	0	0	0	0	0	0	1	0
FW	(England) Peter Beadle	22(3)	6	3	0	0	0	4(2)	4	29(5)	10
DF	(England) Mickey Bell	33(2)	5	3	0	1	0	4	0	41(2)	5
MF	(England) Tommy Black	4	0	0	0	0	0	0	0	4	0
DF	(Canada) Jim Brennan	11(1)	2	0	0	4	0	0	0	15(1)	2
DF	(England) Aaron Brown	10(3)	2	0	0	0(2)	0	3	0	13(5)	2
FW	(England) Marvin Brown	0(2)	0	0	0	0(1)	0	0(2)	0	0(5)	0
MF	(England) Joe Burnell	15(2)	0	0	0	0	0	3	1	18(2)	1
MF	(Republic of Ireland) John Burns	6(5)	0	0	0	0	0	1(1)	0	7(6)	0
DF	(England) Louis Carey	20(2)	0	0	0	2	0	5	0	27(2)	0
DF	(England) Simon Clist	8(1)	0	0	0	0	0	1(2)	0	9(3)	0
DF	(England) Danny Coles	0(1)	0	0	0	0	0	0	0	0(1)	0
MF	(Northern Ireland) Tommy Doherty	0(1)	0	0	0	0(1)	0	0	0	0(2)	0
MF	(Barbados) Gregory Goodridge	13(8)	0	0(1)	0	2(1)	0	1	1	16(10)	1
MF	(England) Matthew Hewlett	5(2)	0	0	0	0	0	2(1)	1	7(3)	1
DF	(England) Matt Hill	8(6)	0	0	0	0	0	3(2)	0	11(8)	0
MF	(England) Paul Holland	22(5)	0	3	0	0	0	4	2	29(4)	2
MF	(England) Robin Hulbert	1(1)	0	0	0	0	0	0	0	1(1)	0
DF	(England) Carl Hutchings	17(4)	1	2(1)	0	2	1	1	0	22(5)	2
FW	(England) Steve Jones	12(2)	2	2(1)	0	2	0	0	0	16(3)	2
DF	(England) Andy Jordan	8	0	0	0	1	1	1	0	10	1
DF	(Scotland) Gerard Lavin	18(1)	0	2	0	1	0	1	0	22(1)	0
FW	(England) Alex Meechan	5(7)	4	0(1)	0	1	0	1	0	7(8)	4
GK	(England) Billy Mercer	25	0	2	0	0	0	5	0	32	0
DF	(England) Keith Millen	28	2	2	0	0	0	6	0	36	2
MF	(England) Paul Mortimer	22(1)	0	2	0	3	1	0	0	27	1
MF	(Scotland) Scott Murray	31(10)	6	2(1)	3	4	0	5(1)	2	42(12)	11
FW	(Nigeria) Kayode Odejayi	0(3)	0	0	0	0	0	0	0	0(3)	0
GK	(England) Steve Phillips	21	0	1	0	4	0	1	0	27	0
FW	(Italy) Lorenzo Pinamonte	2(4)	0	0	0	1(2)	0	0	0	3(6)	0
DF	(Hungary) Vilmos Sebők	8(3)	0	0	0	4	0	0	0	12(3)	0
DF	(England) Mark Shail	0(1)	0	0	0	0	0	0	0	0(1)	0
FW	(England) Damian Spencer	6(3)	1	0	0	0	0	1(2)	0	7(4)	1
DF	(England) Shaun Taylor	25	4	3	0	4	0	0	0	32	4
DF	(Moldova) Ion Testemitanu	11(5)	2	2(1)	0	0	0	3	0	16(6)	2
FW	(England) Tony Thorpe	24(7)	13	0	0	1(1)	1	5	3	30(8)	17
MF	(England) Brian Tinnion	42(2)	3	3	2	4	0	4	0	53(1)	3
FW	(England) Steve Torpey	15(5)	1	1	0	2(1)	1	1(1)	0	19(7)	2
FW	(England) Ben Wright	0(2)	0	0	0	0	0	0	0	0(2)	0

== See also ==
- 1999–2000 in English football
