= 2002–03 Bristol City F.C. season =

Bristol City
2002–03 season
- Chairman: Steve Lansdown
- Manager: Danny Wilson
- Stadium: Ashton Gate
- Second Division: 3rd
- FA Cup: Third round
- League Cup: First round
- Football League Trophy: Winners
- Top goalscorer: League: Scott Murray (19); All: Scott Murray (27)

The 2002–03 season was Bristol City Football Club's 105th season in English football, and their fourth consecutive season in the Second Division. It was Danny Wilson's third year in charge of the club since his arrival in July 2000. A third place saw Bristol City reach the play-offs, but a 1–0 defeat to Cardiff City in the semi-finals, ended their hopes of league promotion. However, the club saw some success, after reaching the final in the Football League Trophy, where they beat Carlisle United 2–0, but failed to repeat this throughout the rest of the season, as they exited in the third round of the FA Cup, losing to Leicester City, and the first round of the League Cup against Oxford United.

The club's leading goalscorer was Scott Murray, with 27 goals in all competitions.

== Player details ==
=== Squad information ===
#	Name	Nationality	Date of Birth (Age)	Caps	Goals	League debut
Goalkeepers
1	Steve Phillips	England	6 May 1978 (aged 24)	148	0	
14	Mike Stowell	England	19 April 1965 (aged 37)	25	0	11 August 2001 vs Northampton Town
21	Billy Mercer	England	22 May 1969 (aged 33)	25	0	2 November 1999 vs Gillingham
34	Boaz Myhill	Wales	9 November 1982 (aged 19)	0	0	
Defenders
2	Louis Carey	Scotland	22 January 1977 (aged 25)	274	4	
3	Mickey Bell	England	15 November 1971 (aged 30)	234	33	9 August 1997 vs Grimsby Town
5	Tony Butler	England	28 September 1972 (aged 29)	40	1	31 August 2002 vs Tranmere Rovers
6	Matthew Hill	England	26 March 1981 (aged 21)	135	4	7 November 1998 vs Wolves
Midfielders
4	Tommy Doherty	Northern Ireland	17 March 1979 (aged 23)	128	4	
7	Scott Murray	Scotland	26 May 1974 (aged 28)	226	46	20 December 1997 vs Chesterfield
8	Joe Burnell	England	10 October 1980 (aged 21)	116	0	15 January 2000 vs Bournemouth
11	Brian Tinnion	England	23 February 1968 (aged 34)	395	34	
15	Robin Hulbert	England	14 March 1980 (aged 22)	39	0	24 April 2000 vs Oxford United
Strikers
9	Peter Beadle	England	13 May 1972 (aged 30)	83	14	19 October 1999 vs Colchester United
10	Lee Peacock	Scotland	9 October 1976 (aged 25)	105	40	12 August 2000 vs Wrexham
12	Aaron Brown	England	14 March 1980 (aged 22)	130	7	12 December 1998 vs Crystal Palace

== Final league table ==
Pos	Team	Pld	W	D	L	GF	GA	GD	Pts	Promotion or relegation
1	Wigan Athletic (C, P)	46	29	13	4	68	25	+43	100	Promotion to Football League First Division
2	Crewe Alexandra (P)	46	25	11	10	76	40	+36	86	Promotion to Football League First Division
3	Bristol City	46	24	11	11	79	48	+31	83	Qualification for the Second Division play-offs
4	Queens Park Rangers	46	24	11	11	69	45	+24	83	Qualification for the Second Division play-offs
5	Oldham Athletic	46	22	16	8	68	38	+30	82	Qualification for the Second Division play-offs

Rules for classification: In the Football League goals scored (GF) takes precedence over goal difference (GD).
(C) Champions; (P) Promoted

== Matches ==
=== Pre-season ===
Pre-season match details
Date	Opponents	Venue	Result	Score F–A	Scorers	Attendance	Ref.
23 July 2002	Yeovil Town	Away	L	0–1		927	
27 July 2002	Ipswich Town	Home	L	0–3		5,017	
30 July 2002	Exeter City	Away	W	1–0	Murray 63'	1,253	
31 July 2002	Tiverton Town	Away	D	1–1	Roberts 15'	430	
3 August 2002	Hereford United	Away	W	5–0	Goodison 16', Roberts 45', Lita (2) 82', 90', Woodman 85'	961	

=== Second Division ===
Second Division match details
Date	Opponents	Venue	Result	Score F–A	Scorers	Attendance	Ref.
10 August 2002	Blackpool	Home	W	2–0	Peacock 77', Murray 90'	11,891	
13 August 2002	Brentford	Away	L	0–1		7,130	
17 August 2002	Wigan Athletic	Away	L	0–2		6,548	
24 August 2002	Wycombe Wanderers	Home	W	3–0	Bell 38', Murray 52', Roberts 72'	9,597	
26 August 2002	Plymouth Argyle	Away	L	0–2		11,922	
31 August 2002	Tranmere Rovers	Home	W	2–0	Tinnion 70' pen., Murray 74'	9,849	
6 September 2002	Northampton Town	Home	W	3–0	Peacock (2) 7', 76', Clist 87'	11,104	
14 September 2002	Cheltenham Town	Away	W	3–2	Murray 3', Coles 43', Matthews 53'	5,895	
17 September 2002	Oldham Athletic	Away	L	0–1		5,583	
21 September 2002	Queens Park Rangers	Home	L	1–3	Murray 11'	12,221	
28 September 2002	Port Vale	Away	W	3–2	Beadle 18', Murray 40', Lita 90'	4,286	
5 October 2002	Chesterfield	Home	W	4–0	Roberts 26', Hill 63', Murray 90', 90'	10,107	
12 October 2002	Barnsley	Away	W	4–1	Butler 19', Roberts (3) 28', 58', 73'	10,495	
19 October 2002	Swindon Town	Home	W	2–0	Murray 12', Tinnion 38'	13,205	
26 October 2002	Peterborough United	Away	W	3–1	Tinnion 3', Brown 17', Murray 90'	5,332	
29 October 2002	Huddersfield Town	Home	W	1–0	Hill 38'	11,494	
9 November 2002	Colchester United	Away	D	2–2	Peacock (2) 42', 58'	3,398	
23 November 2002	Mansfield Town	Away	W	5–4	Murray 39', Roberts (2) 50', 90', Tinnion 87' pen., Lita 90'	4,801	
30 November 2002	Crewe Alexandra	Home	D	2–2	Murray 48', Peacock 84'	12,585	
14 December 2002	Cardiff City	Away	W	2–0	Tinnion 49' pen., Roberts 76'	15,239	
21 December 2002	Luton Town	Home	D	1–1	Beadle 90'	14,057	
26 December 2002	Plymouth Argyle	Home	D	0–0		18,085	
28 December 2002	Stockport County	Away	W	4–1	Peacock 19', Coles 40', Rosenior 45', Beadle 89'	5,100	
1 January 2003	Wycombe Wanderers	Away	L	1–2	Tinnion 87' pen.	6,785	
10 January 2003	Wigan Athletic	Home	L	0–1		13,151	
18 January 2003	Tranmere Rovers	Away	D	1–1	Bell 10'	7,459	
25 January 2003	Stockport County	Home	D	1–1	Roberts 50'	10,831	
1 February 2003	Blackpool	Away	D	0–0		7,290	
8 February 2003	Colchester United	Home	L	1–2	Fagan 51'	11,107	
11 February 2003	Brentford	Home	D	0–0		9,084	
15 February 2003	Notts County	Away	L	0–2		7,048	
22 February 2003	Northampton Town	Away	W	2–1	Robins 12', Tinnion 35'	4,688	
1 March 2003	Cheltenham Town	Home	W	3–1	Robins 2', Brown 20', Rosenior 90'	11,711	
4 March 2003	Oldham Athletic	Home	W	2–0	Murray 54', Roberts 90'	11,194	
8 March 2003	Queens Park Rangers	Away	L	0–1		14,681	
15 March 2003	Peterborough United	Home	W	1–0	Robins 12'	11,231	
19 March 2003	Swindon Town	Away	D	1–1	Robins 48'	8,629	
22 March 2003	Huddersfield Town	Away	W	2–1	Hill 17', Peacock 36'	9,477	
29 March 2003	Barnsley	Home	W	2–0	Murray 6', Roberts 63'	10,232	
12 April 2003	Mansfield Town	Home	W	5–2	Peacock 13', Murray (3) 32', 51', 80', Carey 70'	12,013	
15 April 2003	Crewe Alexandra	Away	D	1–1	Roberts 62'	7,901	
19 April 2003	Luton Town	Away	D	2–2	Tinnion 66' pen., Peacock 75'	6,381	
22 April 2003	Cardiff City	Home	W	2–0	Tinnion 55' pen., Roberts 73'	15,615	
26 April 2003	Chesterfield	Away	L	0–2		4,770	
3 May 2003	Port Vale	Home	W	2–0	Murray 31', Peacock 43'	12,410	

==== Play-offs ====
10 May 2003
15:00

Cardiff City	1–0	Bristol City
Thorne 74'	Report

Ninian Park, Cardiff
Attendance: 19,146
Referee: Howard Webb

13 May 2003
19:45

Bristol City	0–0	Cardiff City
	Report

Ashton Gate, Bristol
Attendance: 16,307
Referee: Jeff Winter

Cardiff City won 1–0 on aggregate.

=== FA Cup ===
FA Cup match details
Round	Date	Opponents	Venue	Result	Score F–A	Scorers	Attendance	Ref.
First round	16 November 2002	Heybridge Swifts	Away	W	7–0	Roberts (2) 16', 40', Tinnion 40' pen., Murray (2) 45', 61', Lita (2) 66', 82'	2,046	
Second round	8 December 2002	Harrogate Railway Athletic	Away	W	3–1	Walker 20' o.g., Murray 53', Roberts 90'	3,500	
Third round	4 January 2003	Leicester City	Away	L	0–2		25,868	

=== League Cup ===
Bristol City entered the first round of the League Cup, where they were drawn against Oxford United.

Football League Cup match details
Round	Date	Opponents	Venue	Result	Score F–A	Scorers	Attendance	Ref.
First round	10 September 2002	Oxford United	Away	L	0–1		4,065	

=== Football League Trophy ===
Football League Trophy match details
Round	Date	Opponents	Venue	Result	Score F–A	Scorers	Attendance	Ref.
First round	22 October 2002	Queens Park Rangers	Away	W	0–0 (a.e.t.) (5–4 p)		4,722	
Second round	12 November 2002	Boston United	Away	W	2–1; Golden goal	Murray 33', Coles 111'	1,408	
Third round	11 December 2002	Wycombe Wanderers	Home	W	3–0	Murray 41', Peacock (2) 64', 71'	3,506	
Fourth round	21 January 2003	Bournemouth	Away	W	3–1	Bell (2) 68', 77', Murray 90'	5,125	
Semi-finals, First leg	18 February 2003	Cambridge United	Home	W	4–2	Doherty 21', Burnell 64', Murray 67', Robins 77'	7,173	
Semi-finals, Second leg	25 February 2003	Cambridge United	Away	W	3–0; 7–2 agg.	Carey 11', Murray 45', Roberts 80'	3,956	
Final	6 April 2003	Carlisle United	Neutral	W	2–0	Peacock 78', Rosenior 89'	50,913	
