= 1998–99 Bristol City F.C. season =

Bristol City
1998–99 season
- Chairman: Scott Davidson
- Manager: John Ward (until 28 October); Benny Lennartsson (from 28 October)
- Stadium: Ashton Gate
- Football League First Division: 24th (relegated)
- FA Cup: Third round
- Worthington Cup: Second round
- Top goalscorer: League: Akinbiyi (19); All: Akinbiyi (23)
- Average home league attendance: 12,840

During the 1998–99 English football season, Bristol City F.C. competed in the Football League First Division.

== Season summary ==
The Robins struggled back in Division One, and manager John Ward stepped down in October 1998 after chairman Davidson appointed Benny Lennartsson as a coach for the rest of the season, which infuriated the supporters. They were relegated by finishing at the bottom of the league, where Lennartsson was sacked and replaced by Gillingham's Tony Pulis.

== Final league table ==
Pos	Team	Pld	W	D	L	GF	GA	GD	Pts	Qualification or relegation
20	Queens Park Rangers	46	12	11	23	52	61	−9	47	
21	Port Vale	46	13	8	25	45	75	−30	47	
22	Bury (R)	46	10	17	19	35	60	−25	47	Relegation to the Second Division
23	Oxford United (R)	46	10	14	22	48	71	−23	44	Relegation to the Second Division
24	Bristol City (R)	46	9	15	22	57	80	−23	42	Relegation to the Second Division

Rules for classification: 1) Points; 2) Goals scored; 3) Goal difference
(R) Relegated

== Results ==
Bristol City's score comes first

=== Legend ===
Win	Draw	Loss

=== Football League First Division ===
Date	Opponent	Venue	Result	Attendance	Scorers
9 August 1998	Oxford United	H	2–2	13,729	S Andersen (2)
15 August 1998	Queens Park Rangers	A	1–1	13,337	Hewlett
22 August 1998	Watford	H	1–4	13,063	S Andersen
29 August 1998	Tranmere Rovers	A	1–1	5,960	Akinbiyi
31 August 1998	Huddersfield Town	H	1–2	11,801	Goodridge
5 September 1998	Swindon Town	A	2–3	8,537	Akinbiyi, Bell (pen)
8 September 1998	Sunderland	A	1–1	34,111	S Andersen
13 September 1998	West Bromwich Albion	H	1–3	13,761	Watts
19 September 1998	Ipswich Town	A	1–3	13,657	Akinbiyi
26 September 1998	Crewe Alexandra	H	5–2	9,810	Doherty, Goodridge, Murray, Akinbiyi, Hutchings
29 September 1998	Barnsley	H	1–1	12,005	Bell
3 October 1998	Bury	A	1–0	4,794	Bell (pen)
10 October 1998	Portsmouth	H	2–2	13,056	Murray, S Andersen
17 October 1998	Port Vale	A	2–3	6,691	Murray, Akinbiyi
20 October 1998	Grimsby Town	A	1–2	5,082	S Andersen
23 October 1998	Bolton Wanderers	H	2–1	12,026	Akinbiyi, Bell (pen)
31 October 1998	Bradford City	A	0–5	14,468	
7 November 1998	Wolverhampton Wanderers	H	1–6	15,432	Hutchings
14 November 1998	Crystal Palace	A	1–2	17,821	S Andersen
21 November 1998	Stockport County	H	1–1	11,032	Thorpe
28 November 1998	Birmingham City	A	2–4	17,577	Thorpe, S Andersen
5 December 1998	Sheffield United	H	2–0	11,134	Bell (pen), Akinbiyi
12 December 1998	Crystal Palace	H	1–1	13,014	Akinbiyi
19 December 1998	Norwich City	A	1–2	17,022	Akinbiyi
26 December 1998	Watford	A	0–1	15,081	
28 December 1998	Swindon Town	H	3–1	16,257	Torpey (2), Akinbiyi
9 January 1999	Oxford United	A	0–0	9,434	
16 January 1999	Tranmere Rovers	H	1–1	13,217	Locke
30 January 1999	Huddersfield Town	A	2–2	14,034	Akinbiyi, Locke
5 February 1999	Queens Park Rangers	A	0–0	13,841	
13 February 1999	Sunderland	H	0–1	15,736	
20 February 1999	West Bromwich Albion	A	2–2	16,490	Akinbiyi (2)
27 February 1999	Ipswich Town	H	0–1	14,065	
9 March 1999	Bury	H	1–1	11,606	S Andersen
13 March 1999	Wolverhampton Wanderers	A	0–3	25,237	
20 March 1999	Bradford City	H	2–3	10,870	Akinbiyi, S Andersen
23 March 1999	Barnsley	A	0–2	14,733	
3 April 1999	Port Vale	H	2–0	11,039	Akinbiyi, Howells
5 April 1999	Portsmouth	A	1–0	13,026	Locke
10 April 1999	Grimsby Town	H	4–1	11,616	Torpey, Akinbiyi (2), Tinnion
13 April 1999	Bolton Wanderers	A	0–1	14,459	
17 April 1999	Stockport County	A	2–2	7,602	Brennan, Torpey
24 April 1999	Birmingham City	H	1–2	15,845	Akinbiyi
27 April 1999	Crewe Alexandra	A	0–1	5,579	
1 May 1999	Sheffield United	A	1–3	17,310	Akinbiyi
9 May 1999	Norwich City	H	1–0	11,362	Pinamonte

=== FA Cup ===
Round	Date	Opponent	Venue	Result	Attendance	Goalscorers
R3	2 January 1999	Everton	H	0–2	19,608	

=== League Cup ===
Round	Date	Opponent	Venue	Result	Attendance	Goalscorers
R1 1st Leg	11 August 1998	Shrewsbury Town	H	4–0	3,585	Hutchings, Akinbiyi (2), S Andersen
R1 2nd Leg	18 August 1998	Shrewsbury Town	A	3–4 (won 7–4 on agg)	1,011	Thorpe, Akinbiyi, Doherty
R2 1st Leg	16 September 1998	Crewe Alexandra	H	1–1	3,082	Akinbiyi
R2 2nd Leg	22 September 1998	Crewe Alexandra	A	0–2 (lost 1–3 on agg)	3,089	

== Squad ==
Note: Flags indicate national team as defined under FIFA eligibility rules; some limited exceptions apply. Players may hold more than one non-FIFA nationality.

No.	Pos.	Nation	Player
-	GK	ENG	Keith Welch
-	DF	ENG	Adam Locke
-	DF	ENG	Louis Carey
-	DF	ENG	Michael Bell
-	DF	CAN	Jim Brennan
-	MF	ENG	Brian Tinnion
-	MF	SCO	Scott Murray
-	FW	NGA	Ade Akinbiyi
-	FW	BRB	Gregory Goodridge
-	MF	NIR	Tommy Doherty
-	FW	DEN	Søren Andersen
-	DF	SWE	Mark Shail (captain)
-	GK	ENG	Steve Phillips
-	DF	WAL	Robert Edwards
-	FW	ENG	Steve Torpey
-	MF	ENG	Carl Hutchings
-	DF	ENG	Julian Watts
-	DF	ENG	Aaron Brown
-	DF	HUN	Vilmos Sebők

No.	Pos.	Nation	Player
-	FW	ENG	Tony Thorpe
-	MF	ENG	Matthew Hewlett
-	DF	MDA	Ion Testemitanu
-	MF	ENG	David Howells (on loan from Southampton)
-	DF	ENG	Shaun Taylor
-	FW	SCO	Colin Cramb
-	DF	ENG	Sean Dyche
-	DF	WAL	Christian Edwards (on loan from Nottingham Forest)
-	MF	ENG	Neil Heaney (on loan from Manchester City)
-	GK	DEN	Bo Andersen
-	DF	NED	Clemens Zwijnenberg
-	DF	ENG	Kevin Langan
-	FW	ITA	Lorenzo Pinamonte
-	DF	SCO	Andy Jordan
-	DF	ENG	Matt Hill
-	FW	ENG	Alex Meechan
-	MF	ENG	Joe Burnell
-	GK	ENG	Stuart Naylor
