= 2000–01 Bristol City F.C. season =

Bristol City
2000–01 season
- Football League Second Division: 9th
- FA Cup: Fifth Round
- League Cup: First Round
- League Trophy: First Round

The 2000–01 season saw Bristol City compete in the Football League Second Division where they finished in 9th position with 68 points.

== Final league table ==
Pos	Team	Pld	W	D	L	GF	GA	GD	Pts
7	Bournemouth	46	20	13	13	79	55	+24	73
8	Notts County	46	19	12	15	62	66	−4	69
9	Bristol City	46	18	14	14	70	56	+14	68
10	Wrexham	46	17	12	17	65	71	−6	63
11	Port Vale	46	16	14	16	55	49	+6	62

Rules for classification: 1) Points; 2) Goal difference; 3) Goals scored

== Results ==
Bristol City's score comes first

=== Legend ===
Win	Draw	Loss

=== Football League Second Division ===
Match	Date	Opponent	Venue	Result	Attendance	Scorers
1	12 August 2000	Wrexham	A	2–0	5,852	Thorpe, Holland
2	19 August 2000	Stoke City	H	1–2	12,590	Thomas (o.g.)
3	26 August 2000	Cambridge United	A	0–1	3,716	
4	28 August 2000	Rotherham United	H	0–1	8,280	
5	9 September 2000	Swindon Town	H	0–1	10,110	
6	16 September 2000	Oldham Athletic	A	0–0	4,095	
7	23 September 2000	Colchester United	H	1–1	7,411	Thorpe
8	30 September 2000	Oxford United	A	1–0	5,308	Murray
9	6 October 2000	Bournemouth	H	3–3	8,936	Thorpe (3)
10	14 October 2000	Walsall	A	0–0	6,576	
11	17 October 2000	Millwall	A	1–1	9,694	Murray
12	21 October 2000	Reading	H	4–0	11,134	Murray, Bell, Peacock (2)
13	24 October 2000	Peterborough United	H	2–1	9,219	Peacock, Thorpe
14	28 October 2000	Wycombe Wanderers	A	2–1	6,051	Thorpe (2)
15	31 October 2000	Swansea City	A	2–2	5,286	Smith (o.g.), Carey
16	4 November 2000	Notts County	H	4–0	10,250	Clist, Murray, Thorpe, Peacock
17	11 November 2000	Luton Town	A	3–0	6,595	Murray, Peacock, Bell
18	25 November 2000	Wigan Athletic	H	1–1	12,708	Peacock
19	2 December 2000	Bury	H	4–1	9,416	Clist, Thorpe, Murray, Carey
20	12 December 2000	Brentford	H	1–2	8,096	Peacock
21	16 December 2000	Port Vale	A	2–1	4,113	Peacock (2)
22	22 December 2000	Bristol Rovers	H	3–2	16,696	Millen, Beadle, Thorpe
23	26 December 2000	Northampton Town	A	0–2	6,064	
24	30 December 2000	Stoke City	A	0–1	14,629	
25	1 January 2001	Cambridge United	H	6–2	10,637	Murray (2), Thorpe (3), Tinnion
26	13 January 2001	Rotherham United	A	1–1	5,654	Beadle
27	20 January 2001	Northampton United	H	2–0	11,630	Clist, Bell
28	3 February 2001	Swansea City	H	3–1	10,379	Bell, Beadle, Thorpe
29	10 February 2001	Swindon Town	A	1–1	10,031	Beadle
30	13 February 2001	Wrexham	H	2–1	9,500	Millen, Peacock
31	20 February 2001	Brentford	A	1–2	4,823	Thorpe
32	24 February 2001	Colchester United	A	0–4	3,430	
33	3 March 2001	Oxford United	H	0–0	9,681	
34	6 March 2001	Walsall	H	1–3	9,263	Thorpe
35	10 March 2001	Bournemouth	A	0–4	4,028	
36	16 March 2001	Millwall	H	2–1	10,395	Carey, Matthews
37	23 March 2001	Reading	A	3–1	15,716	Thorpe, Matthews, Peacock
38	27 March 2001	Oldham Athletic	H	2–2	9,568	Peacock, Maddison
39	31 March 2001	Port Vale	H	1–1	11,782	Murray
40	3 April 2001	Bristol Rovers	A	1–1	9,361	Peacock
41	7 April 2001	Bury	A	1–0	3,729	Lourenço
42	14 April 2001	Peterborough United	A	1–2	6,560	Matthews
43	16 April 2001	Wycombe Wanderers	H	1–2	11,643	Murray
44	21 April 2001	Notts County	A	1–2	5,396	Clist
45	28 April 2001	Luton Town	H	3–1	9,161	Thorpe, Brown (2)
46	5 May 2001	Wigan Athletic	A	0–0	10,048	

=== FA Cup ===
Match	Date	Opponent	Venue	Result	Attendance	Scorers
R1	18 November 2000	Chesterfield	A	1–0	5,210	Thorpe
R2	9 December 2000	Kettering Town	H	3–1	7,641	Peacock, Clist, Thorpe
R3	6 January 2001	Huddersfield Town	A	2–0	9,192	Clist, Beadle
R4	27 January 2001	Kingstonian	H	1–1	14,787	Thorpe
R4 Replay	7 February 2001	Kingstonian	A	1–0	3,341	Murray
R5	17 February 2001	Leicester City	A	0–3	20,905	

=== Football League Cup ===
Match	Date	Opponent	Venue	Result	Attendance	Scorers
R1 1st leg	22 August 2000	Brentford	H	2–2	3,471	Thorpe, Peacock
R1 2nd leg	5 September 2000	Brentford	A	1–2	2,310	Holland

=== Football League Trophy ===
Match	Date	Opponent	Venue	Result	Attendance	Scorers
R1	5 December 2000	Plymouth Argyle	A	0–3	1,364	

== Squad statistics ==
No.	Pos.	Name	League		FA Cup		League Cup		Other		Total	
No.	Pos.	Name	Apps	Goals	Apps	Goals	Apps	Goals	Apps	Goals	Apps	Goals
1	GK	(England) Billy Mercer	0	0	0	0	0	0	0	0	0	0
2	DF	(England) Louis Carey	46	3	6	0	2	0	0	0	54	3
3	DF	(England) Michael Bell	41	4	6	0	2	0	0	0	49	4
4	MF	(England) Paul Holland	5	1	0	0	2	1	0	0	7	2
5	DF	(England) Keith Millen	28(1)	2	6	0	1	0	0	0	35(1)	2
6	MF	(England) Neil Maddison	4(3)	1	0	0	0	0	0	0	4(3)	1
6	DF	(England) Andy Jordan	1(1)	0	0	0	0(1)	0	0	0	1(2)	0
7	MF	(Scotland) Scott Murray	46	10	6	1	2	0	0	0	54	11
8	MF	(England) Tommy Doherty	0	0	0	0	0	0	0(1)	0	0(1)	0
9	FW	(England) Peter Beadle	18(15)	4	3(2)	1	1	0	1	0	23(17)	5
10	FW	(England) Tony Thorpe	33(6)	19	5(1)	3	1	1	0	0	39(7)	23
11	MF	(England) Brian Tinnion	40(2)	1	6	0	2	0	0	0	48(2)	1
12	MF	(Barbados) Gregory Goodridge	1(6)	0	0	0	1	0	1	0	3(6)	0
13	GK	(England) Alan Miller	4	0	0	0	0	0	0	0	4	0
13	FW	(Portugal) Dani Rodrigues	3(1)	0	0	0	0	0	0	0	3(1)	0
14	GK	(England) Steve Phillips	42	0	6	0	1	0	0	0	49	0
15	DF	(England) Mark Lever	2	0	0	0	1	0	0	0	3	0
16	FW	(England) Lee Peacock	31(4)	13	4	1	1	1	0	0	36(4)	15
17	FW	(England) Lee Matthews	4(2)	3	0	0	0	0	0	0	4(2)	3
17	MF	(England) Darren Dunning	9	0	0	0	0	0	0	0	9	0
18	FW	(Portugal) Luís Lourenço	1(2)	1	0	0	0	0	0	0	1(2)	1
18	MF	(England) Carl Hutchings	0	0	0	0	0	0	0	0	0	0
19	DF	(England) Gerard Lavin	3	0	0	0	2	0	0	0	5	0
20	MF	(England) Paul Mortimer	0	0	0	0	0	0	0	0	0	0
21	DF	(Moldova) Ion Testemițanu	4(7)	0	0	0	1	0	1	0	6(7)	0
22	DF	(England) Aaron Brown	27(8)	2	6	0	0	1	0	0	34(8)	2
23	MF	(England) Joe Burnell	19(4)	0	0(3)	0	0	0	1	0	20(7)	0
24	DF	(England) Matt Hill	32(2)	0	6	0	1	0	0	0	39(2)	0
25	FW	(England) Damian Spencer	2(2)	0	0	0	0(1)	0	0(1)	0	2(4)	0
27	DF	(England) Kevin Amankwaah	8(6)	0	0(1)	0	0	0	1	0	9(7)	0
28	MF	(England) Alex Meechan	0	0	0	0	0	0	0	0	0	0
29	MF	(England) Robin Hulbert	14(5)	0	0	0	0(2)	0	0	0	14(7)	0
30	FW	(England) Marvin Brown	0(5)	0	0(1)	0	0	0	0	0	0(6)	0
31	MF	(England) Simon Clist	36(2)	4	6	2	0	0	0(1)	0	44(3)	4
32	FW	(Nigeria) Kayode Odejayi	0(3)	0	0	0	0	0	1	0	1(3)	0
33	DF	(England) Danny Coles	1(1)	0	0	0	0	0	1	0	2(1)	0
37	DF	(England) Craig Woodman	1(1)	0	0	0	0	0	1	0	2(1)	0
41	GK	(England) Antony Malessa	0(1)	0	0	0	1	0	1	0	2(1)	0
43	DF	(Wales) Darren Jones	0	0	0	0	0	0	0(1)	0	0(1)	0
