= Micky Bell =

English footballer and manager

Personal information
- Full name: Michael Bell
- Date of birth: 15 November 1971 (age 54)
- Place of birth: Newcastle upon Tyne, England
- Height: 5 ft 8 in (1.73 m)
- Position: Defender

Team information
- Current team: Bristol City (Professional Development Phase Coach)

Senior career*
Years	Team	Apps	(Gls)
1990–1994	Northampton Town	153	(10)
1994–1997	Wycombe Wanderers	118	(5)
1997–2005	Bristol City	292	(34)
2005–2006	Port Vale	15	(2)
2006–2007	Cheltenham Town	16	(0)
2007–2008	Team Bath		
2008–2009	Weston-super-Mare	10	(0)
2011–2012	Clevedon Town	1	(0)
Total		605+	(51+)

Managerial career
- 2010–2014: Clevedon Town
- 2014: Weston-super-Mare
- 2015–2021: Clevedon Town
- * Club domestic league appearances and goals

Michael Bell (born 15 November 1971) is an English former footballer. In a 17-year career as a professional in the English Football League, he made 694 league and cup appearances with five different clubs, playing as a defender.

Starting his career with Northampton Town in 1990, he would make over 150 appearances for the club over four years. He then transferred to Wycombe Wanderers for £55,000 in October 1994, where he would make 118 league appearances in three years. He then made a £150,000 move to Bristol City in August 1997 and would make 345 appearances in all competitions in an eight-year association with the club. He then spent a brief spell at Port Vale before joining Cheltenham Town in January 2006. He then dropped into non-League football with Team Bath and Weston-super-Mare, before being appointed as manager of Clevedon Town in May 2010. He left Clevedon in January 2014 and four months later took charge for a brief spell at Weston-super-Mare. He returned to manage Clevedon Town for a second spell the following year.

He won numerous honours during his career, being voted onto the PFA Team of the Year for the Second Division in 1999–2000, 2000–01, 2001–02, and 2002–03. He helped Bristol City to promotion out of the Second Division in 1997–98. He played in the finals of the Football League Trophy in 2000 and 2003. He also helped Cheltenham Town to win the League Two play-off final in 2006.

== Playing career ==
=== Northampton Town ===
Bell started his career at Northampton Town, a club pushing for the Fourth Division play-offs in 1990–91 under the stewardship of Theo Foley. The "Cobblers" dropped to 16th in 1991–92, before plummeting to 20th place in 1992–93 under Phil Chard. They then flat-lined in 1993–94 under John Barnwell, finishing bottom of the Football League.

=== Wycombe Wanderers ===
Bell left the County Ground on a £55,000 transfer to Wycombe Wanderers in October 1994. Martin O'Neill led the "Chairboys" to one place and three points outside the Second Division play-offs in 1994–95. However, they dropped to 12th in 1995–96 under new boss Alan Smith. John Gregory then took over at Adams Park and led Wycombe 18th in 1996–97, as Bell made 51 appearances and was voted as the club's Player of the Year.

=== Bristol City ===
He moved on a £150,000 transfer to Bristol City in August 1997 and scored ten goals in 52 games in 1997–98, as John Ward led the "Robins" to the runners-up spot of the Second Division. He made 37 appearances in 1998–99, scoring five goals (including four penalties), as City were relegated out of the First Division in last place under new boss Benny Lennartsson. He scored five goals in 43 appearances in 1999–2000, retaining his first-team place as manager Tony Pulis left and was replaced by David Burnside. He also went on to play in the Football League Trophy final at Wembley, which ended in a 2–1 defeat to Stoke City.

Danny Wilson took the management reins at Ashton Gate in 2000–01, and Bell retained his first-team place, scoring four goals in 49 appearances. Bell scored eight goals in 48 games in 2001–02, as City missed out on the play-offs by finishing one place and five points behind Huddersfield Town in the play-offs. He scored four goals in 46 games in 2002–03, as City reached the play-off semi-finals, only to lose to Cardiff City. Bell was part of a solid back four along with Matt Hill, Tony Butler, and Danny Coles. The club reached the Football League Trophy final for a second time, this time held at the Millennium Stadium, and Bell played 85 minutes of the 2–0 victory over Carlisle United; he was substituted for Matt Hill, as Louis Carey had started the match in Hill's place. He played 30 games in 2003–04, but did not feature in the play-offs as City lost 1–0 to Brighton & Hove Albion in the play-off final. He made 35 appearances in 2004–05, as new boss Brian Tinnion led the club to a 7th-place finish, one place and one point behind Hartlepool United in the play-offs. Bell was later named in the Bristol City Hall Of Fame.

=== Later career ===
He joined Martin Foyle's Port Vale on a free transfer in July 2005, citing the fact that he knew a few players already on the team as a factor in his decision. However, the stay was brief as Bell headed for the exit door at Vale Park after 15 League One appearances in 2005–06. Bell stated the long commute and family reasons for the mutual termination agreement. He signed with Cheltenham Town of League Two in January 2006, who were managed by his former boss John Ward. He played 12 games in 2005–06, and featured in the 1–0 play-off final victory over Grimsby Town; he was a 27th-minute substitute for Craig Armstrong. His time at Whaddon Road was riddled with injuries; he required surgery on his achilles and he did not appear for the "Robins" past Boxing Day of the 2006–07 campaign; subsequently, Bell was not offered a contract in the summer. He was then appointed as a player coach at Team Bath. In December 2007, he began training to be a plumber. He finished the courses and started to train with Weston-super-Mare of the Conference South, where he signed a contract in February 2008. He eventually made ten appearances for the club before being released at the end of the season.

=== Style of play ===
Bell played at left-back, but his free kick and penalty taking skills boosted his goals tally.

== Management career ==
Despite becoming a qualified plumber, he returned to the game in May 2010 when he was appointed manager of Southern League side Clevedon Town. His side finished 20th in the 22 team division in 2010–11 and 2011–12, and then 15th in 2012–13. He also led the "Seasiders" to victory in the Southern League Cup in 2012 and to the Somerset Premier Cup final in the same year (losing to Weston-super-Mare). Bell left the club in January 2014. In April 2014, he joined Mangotsfield United as a coach for a two-month period.

In May 2014, Bell was named as the new manager at Conference South club Weston-super-Mare. He left the club by mutual consent in November after they dropped into the relegation zone of the Conference South. He rejoined Clevedon as the manager in July 2015. He led Clevedon to a 19th-place finish in the Western League Premier Division in 2015–16, a 14th-place finish in 2016–17, 12th in 2017–18, sixth in 2018–19, whilst the 2019–20 season was abandoned. He was appointed as a Professional Development Phase coach at former club Bristol City in October 2021.

== Personal life ==
Bell is the father of Sam Bell, who is also a professional footballer.

== Career statistics ==
Appearances and goals by club, season and competition
Club	Season	League			FA Cup		Other		Total	
Club	Season	Division	Apps	Goals	Apps	Goals	Apps	Goals	Apps	Goals
Northampton Town	1989–90	Third Division	6	0	0	0	0	0	6	0
Northampton Town	1990–91	Fourth Division	28	0	0	0	3	0	31	0
Northampton Town	1991–92	Fourth Division	30	4	0	0	4	0	34	4
Northampton Town	1992–93	Third Division	39	5	4	1	6	1	49	7
Northampton Town	1993–94	Third Division	38	0	1	0	5	0	44	0
Northampton Town	1994–95	Third Division	12	1	0	0	2	0	14	1
Northampton Town	Total		153	10	5	1	20	1	179	12
Wycombe Wanderers	1994–95	Second Division	31	2	3	2	1	0	35	4
Wycombe Wanderers	1995–96	Second Division	41	1	2	0	3	0	46	1
Wycombe Wanderers	1996–97	Second Division	46	2	4	0	5	0	55	2
Wycombe Wanderers	Total		118	5	9	2	9	0	136	7
Bristol City	1997–98	Second Division	44	10	2	0	6	0	52	10
Bristol City	1998–99	First Division	33	5	1	0	3	0	37	5
Bristol City	1999–2000	Second Division	36	5	3	0	5	0	44	5
Bristol City	2000–01	Second Division	41	4	6	0	2	0	49	4
Bristol City	2001–02	Second Division	42	7	1	0	5	1	48	8
Bristol City	2002–03	Second Division	38	2	3	0	5	2	46	4
Bristol City	2003–04	Second Division	27	0	1	0	2	1	30	1
Bristol City	2004–05	League One	31	1	1	0	3	0	35	1
Bristol City	Total		292	34	18	0	31	4	341	38
Port Vale	2005–06	League One	15	2	2	0	1	0	18	2
Cheltenham Town	2005–06	League Two	9	0	0	0	3	0	12	0
Cheltenham Town	2006–07	League One	7	0	0	0	1	0	8	0
Cheltenham Town	Total		16	0	0	0	4	0	20	0
Weston-super-Mare	2008–09	Conference South	10	0	0	0	0	0	10	0
Clevedon Town	2010–11	Southern League; Division One South & West	1	0	0	0	0	0	1	0
Clevedon Town	2011–12	Southern League; Division One South & West	0	0	0	0	0	0	0	0
Clevedon Town	2012–13	Southern League; Division One South & West	0	0	0	0	1	0	1	0
Clevedon Town	Total		1	0	0	0	1	0	2	0
Career total			605	51	34	3	66	5	705	59

== Honours ==
Bristol City

- Football League Second Division second-place promotion: 1997–98
- Football League Trophy: 2002–03; runner-up: 1999–2000

Cheltenham Town

- Football League Two play-offs: 2006

Clevedon Town

- Southern League Cup: 2012
- Somerset Premier Cup runner-up: 2012

Individual

- Wycombe Wanderers Player of the Year: 1996–97
- PFA Team of the Year: 1999–2000 Second Division, 2000–01 Second Division, 2001–02 Second Division, 2002–03 Second Division
- Bristol City Hall of Fame
