= 2001–02 Bristol City F.C. season =

Bristol City
2001–02 season
- Chairman: John Laycock
- Manager: Danny Wilson
- Stadium: Ashton Gate
- Second Division: 7th
- FA Cup: First round
- League Cup: Second round
- Football League Trophy: Southern Area Runners-up
- Top goalscorer: League: Tony Thorpe (16); All: Tony Thorpe (17)

The 2001–02 season was Bristol City Football Club's 104th season in English football, and their third consecutive season in the Second Division. It was Danny Wilson's second year in charge of the club since his arrival in July 2000. The club started the season fairly brightly, but an after Christmas slump meant the club slipped from the play-offs into 7th position.

The club's leading goalscorer was Tony Thorpe, with 17 goals in all competitions.

== Final league table ==
| Pos | Team | Pld | W | D | L | GF | GA | GD | Pts | Promotion or relegation |
|---|---|---|---|---|---|---|---|---|---|---|
| 5 | Stoke City (O, P) | 46 | 23 | 11 | 12 | 67 | 40 | +27 | 80 | Qualification for the Second Division play-offs |
| 6 | Huddersfield Town | 46 | 21 | 15 | 10 | 65 | 47 | +18 | 78 | Qualification for the Second Division play-offs |
| 7 | Bristol City | 46 | 21 | 10 | 15 | 68 | 53 | +15 | 73 | |
| 8 | Queens Park Rangers | 46 | 19 | 14 | 13 | 60 | 49 | +11 | 71 | |
| 9 | Oldham Athletic | 46 | 18 | 16 | 12 | 77 | 65 | +12 | 70 | |

Rules for classification: In the Football League goals scored (GF) takes precedence over goal difference (GD).
(O) Play-off winners; (P) Promoted

== Results ==
Bristol City's score comes first

=== Legend ===
| Win | Draw | Loss |

=== Football League Second Division ===
| Date | Opponent | Venue | Result | Attendance | Scorers |
|---|---|---|---|---|---|
| 11 August 2001 | Northampton Town | A | 3–0 | 5,528 | Thorpe (3) |
| 18 August 2001 | Swindon Town | H | 3–1 | 13,818 | Tinnion, Matthews, Jones |
| 25 August 2001 | Wigan Athletic | A | 2–1 | 6,231 | Murray, Thorpe |
| 30 August 2001 | Queens Park Rangers | A | 0–0 | 11,655 | |
| 8 September 2001 | Port Vale | H | 1–1 | 12,560 | Thorpe |
| 15 September 2001 | Colchester United | H | 3–1 | 9,992 | Murray, Jones, Clist |
| 18 September 2001 | Brentford | A | 2–2 | 6,342 | Tinnion, Bell (pen) |
| 22 September 2001 | Peterborough United | A | 1–4 | 5,550 | Murray |
| 25 September 2001 | Tranmere Rovers | H | 2–0 | 9,634 | Jones, Thorpe |
| 29 September 2001 | Huddersfield Town | A | 0–1 | 10,652 | |
| 5 October 2001 | Chesterfield | H | 3–0 | 10,718 | Jones (2), Thorpe |
| 9 October 2001 | Cardiff City | H | 1–1 | 13,804 | Bell |
| 13 October 2001 | Oldham Athletic | A | 1–0 | 6,565 | Murray |
| 20 October 2001 | Wycombe Wanderers | H | 0–1 | 11,452 | |
| 23 October 2001 | Bournemouth | H | 1–0 | 9,972 | Tinnion |
| 27 October 2001 | Stoke City | A | 0–1 | 16,828 | |
| 3 November 2001 | Brighton & Hove Albion | H | 0–1 | 13,955 | |
| 10 November 2001 | Reading | A | 2–3 | 14,060 | Amankwaah, Thorpe |
| 20 November 2001 | Bury | A | 2–2 | 2,608 | Peacock (2) |
| 24 November 2001 | Blackpool | H | 2–1 | 9,876 | Thorpe, Murray |
| 1 December 2001 | Notts County | H | 3–2 | 9,411 | Peacock (2), Own goal |
| 8 December 2001 | Wrexham | A | 2–0 | 3,091 | Thorpe, Own goal |
| 15 December 2001 | Cambridge United | A | 3–0 | 3,516 | Peacock 2, Own goal |
| 22 December 2001 | Wrexham | H | 1–0 | 12,137 | Own goal |
| 26 December 2001 | Port Vale | A | 0–1 | 5,860 | |
| 29 December 2001 | Cardiff City | A | 3–1 | 16,149 | Murray (2), Matthews |
| 5 January 2002 | Wigan Athletic | H | 2–2 | 9,991 | Peacock (2) |
| 13 January 2002 | Swindon Town | A | 2–1 | 7,273 | Hill, Peacock |
| 19 January 2002 | Northampton Town | H | 1–3 | 11,733 | Thorpe |
| 2 February 2002 | Huddersfield Town | H | 1–1 | 10,643 | Peacock |
| 5 February 2002 | Queens Park Rangers | H | 2–0 | 11,654 | Murray, Thorpe |
| 9 February 2002 | Wycombe Wanderers | A | 1–2 | 7,972 | Peacock |
| 16 February 2002 | Oldham Athletic | H | 3–0 | 10,849 | Peacock, Thorpe, Lever |
| 23 February 2002 | Colchester United | A | 0–0 | 3,558 | |
| 26 February 2002 | Peterborough United | H | 1–0 | 8,299 | Thorpe |
| 2 March 2002 | Brentford | H | 0–2 | 11,421 | |
| 5 March 2002 | Tranmere Rovers | A | 0–1 | 7,735 | |
| 9 March 2002 | Cambridge United | H | 2–0 | 9,817 | Bell (2) |
| 16 March 2002 | Notts County | A | 0–2 | 7,521 | |
| 19 March 2002 | Chesterfield | A | 1–2 | 3,630 | Matthews |
| 23 March 2002 | Bournemouth | A | 3–1 | 7,033 | Bell, Peacock, Thorpe |
| 30 March 2002 | Reading | H | 3–3 | 15,609 | Peacock, Bell, Robinson |
| 1 April 2002 | Brighton & Hove Albion | A | 1–2 | 6,759 | Doherty |
| 6 April 2002 | Bury | H | 2–0 | 9,449 | Bell, Peacock |
| 13 April 2002 | Blackpool | A | 1–5 | 9,333 | Thorpe |
| 20 April 2002 | Stoke City | H | 1–1 | 11,277 | Brown |

=== FA Cup ===
| Round | Date | Opponent | Venue | Result | Attendance | Goalscorers |
|---|---|---|---|---|---|---|
| R1 | 17 November 2001 | Leyton Orient | H | 0–1 | 6,343 | |

=== League Cup ===
| Round | Date | Opponent | Venue | Result | Attendance | Goalscorers |
|---|---|---|---|---|---|---|
| R1 | 21 August 2001 | Cheltenham Town | H | 2–1 | 5,367 | Amankwaah, Jones |
| R2 | 12 September 2001 | Watford | H | 2–3 | 7,256 | Clist, Thorpe |

=== Football League Trophy ===
| Round | Date | Opponent | Venue | Result | Attendance | Goalscorers |
|---|---|---|---|---|---|---|
| Southern Section R1 | 16 October 2001 | Torquay United | H | 1–0 | 3,407 | Peacock |
| Southern Section R2 | 30 October 2001 | Southend United | A | 2–0 | 1,741 | Amankwaah, Peacock |
| Southern Section Quarter-Final | 4 December 2001 | Peterborough United | H | 2–1 | 3,949 | Murray, Thorpe |
| Southern Section Semi-Final | 9 January 2002 | Bristol Rovers | H | 3–0 | 17,367 | Matthews (2), Bell |
| Southern Section Final 1st Leg | 30 January 2002 | Cambridge United | A | 0–0 | 3,470 | |
| Southern Section Final 2nd Leg | 19 February 2002 | Cambridge United | H | 0–2 | 12,264 | |
