= 2003 Football League Trophy final =

2003 Football League Trophy Final
- Event: 2002–03 Football League Trophy
Bristol City	Carlisle United
2	0
- Date: 6 April 2003
- Venue: Millennium Stadium, Cardiff
- Referee: P.Walton (Northamptonshire)
- Attendance: 50,913

The 2003 Football League Trophy Final (known as the LDV Vans Trophy for sponsorship reasons) was the 20th final of the Football League Trophy – a domestic football cup competition for teams from the Football League Second and Third Division. The match was played at the Millennium Stadium in Cardiff, and was contested by Bristol City and Carlisle United on 6 April 2003. Bristol City won the match 2–0.

== Match details ==
6 April 2003
13:30 BST

Bristol City	2–0	Carlisle United
Peacock 78'; Rosenior 89'	(Report)

Millennium Stadium, Cardiff
Attendance: 50,913
Referee: P.Walton (Northamptonshire)

Bristol City	Carlisle United

GK	1	Steve Phillips
RB	2	Louis Carey
CB	5	Tony Butler
CB	19	Danny Coles
LB	3	Michael Bell	(substituted off) 85'
RM	7	Scott Murray
CM	8	Joe Burnell	Booked
CM	4	Tommy Doherty (c)
LM	11	Brian Tinnion	(substituted off) 81'
CF	18	Christian Roberts	(substituted off) 62'
CF	10	Lee Peacock
Substitutes:
GK	14	Mike Stowell
DF	6	Matt Hill	(substituted on) 85'
DF	26	Liam Rosenior	(substituted on) 62'
MF	12	Aaron Brown	(substituted on) 81'
FW	9	Peter Beadle
Manager:
Danny Wilson

GK	27	Matt Glennon
CB	5	Brian Shelley
DF	4	Paul Raven
CB	15	Darren Kelly	Booked	(substituted off) 80'
LB	7	Peter Murphy
CM	24	Jon McCarthy
CM	25	Mark Summerbell	(substituted off) 85'
CM	9	Richie Foran	Booked
RW	17	Stuart Green
CF	34	Craig Farrell	(substituted off) 75'
LW	33	Adam Rundle
Substitute:
DF	3	Lee Maddison	(substituted on) 80'
DF	13	Willo McDonagh	(substituted on) 85'
MF	20	Brendan McGill
FW	11	Brian Wake	(substituted on) 75'
FW	26	Craig Russell
Manager:
Roddy Collins

MATCH RULES

- 90 minutes.
- 30 minutes of extra-time if necessary.
- Penalty shoot-out if scores still level.
- Maximum of 3 substitutions.
