= Kevin Amankwaah =

English footballer (born 1982)

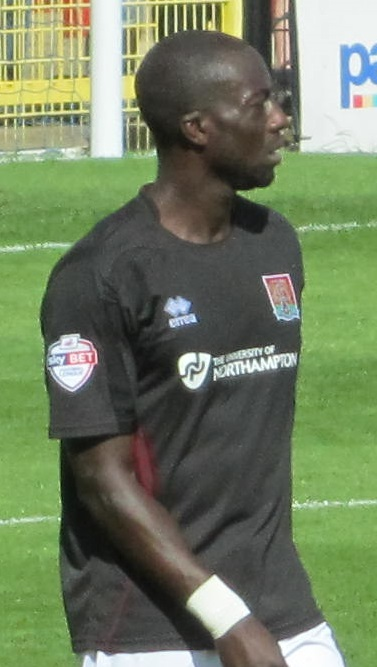
- Amankwaah playing for Northampton Town in 2013

Personal information
- Full name: Kevin Osei-Kuffour Amankwaah
- Date of birth: 19 May 1982 (age 44)
- Place of birth: Harrow, England
- Height: 6 ft 1 in (1.85 m)
- Position: Defender

Youth career
- –2000: Bristol City

Senior career*
Years	Team	Apps	(Gls)
2000–2005	Bristol City	54	(1)
2003	→ Torquay United (loan)	6	(0)
2003	→ Cheltenham Town (loan)	12	(0)
2005	→ Yeovil Town (loan)	9	(0)
2005–2006	Yeovil Town	44	(1)
2006–2008	Swansea City	29	(0)
2008–2011	Swindon Town	88	(5)
2011	Burton Albion	8	(0)
2012	Rochdale	16	(0)
2012–2013	Exeter City	34	(0)
2013–2014	Northampton Town	21	(0)
2014	Salisbury City	14	(0)
2014–2017	Sutton United	91	(3)
2017–2019	Bath City	28	(0)
2019–2020	Salisbury		

International career
2000	England U18	1	(0)
- * Club domestic league appearances and goals

Kevin Osei-Kuffour Amankwaah (born 19 May 1982) is an English former professional footballer who played as a defender. He enjoyed successful stints at Bristol City and Swindon Town.

== Early life ==
Awankwaah was born in Harrow, London to Ghanaian parents.

== Club career ==
He began his career as a trainee with Bristol City, turning professional in June 2000. He made his first team debut on 18 March 2000, replacing Matt Hewlett as a late substitute in the 1–1 draw away to Oldham Athletic and soon became a regular squad member.

Amankwaah received neck injuries in a car crash in March 2002 when he and teammate Aaron Brown were travelling in a car driven by former City trainee Rohan King which collided with another vehicle. He was given a new two-year contract while injured, but struggled to re-establish himself at Ashton Gate after returning from injury, having loan spells at Torquay United in January 2003, and Cheltenham Town in August 2003.

He eventually left Ashton Gate in February 2005, when he signed for Yeovil Town, initially on loan, and then on a permanent basis. Amankwaah signed for Swansea City in July 2006 for a fee of £250,000.

Amankwaah joined Swindon Town in June 2008. He played 89 games for the club, scoring 5 goals before being released on 31 August 2011. Amankwaah still had 6 months to run on his contract when he was released.

On 2 July 2012, Amankwaah signed for League Two side Exeter City on a free transfer. On 30 April 2013, he was released by Exeter along with 3 other players after the expiry of his contract.

After a successful trial with Northampton Town, Amankwaah signed a one-year contract with the option of a further year on 29 July 2013. He made 24 appearances for the Cobblers before having his contract terminated on 23 January 2014. On 17 February 2014, Amankwaah signed for Conference Premier side Salisbury City, making 14 appearances for the Whites.

Amankwaah signed for Sutton United in September 2014. He made a total of 21 full and two substitute league appearances in the 2014–15 season, scoring his first goal for the club when he volleyed in a corner in the last seconds of the game against Chelmsford City on 4 April 2015 to claim a 1–0 victory for Sutton.

Amankwaah made 28 full and three substitute league appearances in the 2015–16 season, helping the U's to lift the National League South title. He netted his second league goal from another corner against Margate on 9 April 2016, a game which Sutton went on to win 4–0.

Amankwaah scored his first goal in Sutton's 2016–17 National League campaign when he scored a consolation goal in a 3–1 away defeat to Dover Athletic on 4 October 2016. On 19 October 2016, it was announced that Amankwaah had signed a one-year contract extension with Sutton United and will stay with the club until the end of the 2017–18 season.

Amankwaah made his 100th career appearance for Sutton on 3 December 2016 in a 2–1 win against League Two club Cheltenham Town in the FA Cup 2nd round. He went on to appear in every round of Sutton's historic run to the 5th round of the FA Cup for the first time ever, including appearances in a 3–1 victory over local rivals AFC Wimbledon of League One on 17 January 2017, a 1–0 victory over Championship side Leeds United on 29 January and an eventual 0–2 defeat to Premier League club Arsenal on 20 February.

== International career ==
Amankwaah was capped by England at under-18 level, making his only appearance in the 2–0 win over Luxembourg in April 2000. In August 2006, he spoke of his ambitions of playing for Ghana.

== Controversy ==
Amankwaah was at the centre of controversy when he made a remark to Millwall player Neil Harris, taunting him about his battle with testicular cancer during a match between Millwall and Swindon. Amankwaah then apologised after the game after his remark was made public, and also made a donation to Everymans Cancer Charity. Harris accepted the apology at first but then withdrew his acceptance after Amankwaah tried to justify his claims for making the remark.

== Personal life ==
Amankwaah's daughter Shantae-Eve is an artistic gymnast, who won two bronze medals at the 2026 Commonwealth Games.

== Career statistics ==
Appearances and goals by club, season and competition
Club	Season	League			FA Cup		League Cup		Other		Total	
Club	Season	Division	Apps	Goals	Apps	Goals	Apps	Goals	Apps	Goals	Apps	Goals
Bristol City	1999–2000	Second Division	5	0	0	0	0	0	1 (Note: Appearance(s) in Football League Trophy)	0	6	0
Bristol City	2000–01	Second Division	15	0	1	0	0	0	0	0	16	0
Bristol City	2001–02	Second Division	24	1	0	0	2	1	3	1	29	3
Bristol City	2002–03	Second Division	2	0	0	0	0	0	0	0	2	0
Bristol City	2003–04	Second Division	5	0	1	2	1	0	0	0	7	2
Bristol City	2004–05	League One	5	0	0	0	0	0	3	0	8	0
Bristol City	Total		56	1	2	2	3	1	7	1	68	5
Torquay United (loan)	2002–03	Third Division	6	0	0	0	0	0	0	0	6	0
Cheltenham Town (loan)	2003–04	Third Division	12	0	0	0	0	0	0	0	12	0
Yeovil Town (loan)	2004–05	League Two	9	0	0	0	0	0	0	0	9	0
Yeovil Town	2004–05	League Two	6	0	0	0	0	0	0	0	6	0
Yeovil Town	2005–06	League One	38	1	3	0	2	0	1	0	44	1
Yeovil Town	Total		44	1	3	0	2	0	1	0	50	1
Swansea City	2006–07	League One	29	0	3	0	1	0	2	0	35	0
Swansea City	2007–08	League One	0	0	1	0	0	0	3	0	4	0
Swansea City	Total		29	0	4	0	1	0	5	0	39	0
Swindon Town	2008–09	League One	31	2	0	0	0	0	2	0	33	2
Swindon Town	2009–10	League One	38	3	3	0	2	0	3 (Note: Two appearances in Football League Trophy and one in League One play-offs)	0	46	3
Swindon Town	2010–11	League One	19	0	1	0	1	0	2	0	23	0
Swindon Town	Total		88	5	4	0	3	0	7	0	102	5
Burton Albion	2011–12	League Two	8	0	0	0	0	0	0	0	8	0
Rochdale	2011–12	League One	16	0	0	0	0	0	0	0	16	0
Exeter City	2012–13	League Two	34	0	1	0	1	0	0	0	36	0
Northampton Town	2013–14	League Two	21	0	1	0	1	0	1	0	24	0
Salisbury City	2013–14	Conference Premier	14	0	—		—		0	0	14	0
Sutton United	2014–15	Conference South	23	1	2	0	—		3 (Note: Two appearances in FA Trophy and one in Surrey Senior Cup)	0	28	1
Sutton United	2015–16	Conference South	31	1	4	1	—		3	1	38	3
Sutton United	2016–17	National League	35	1	7	0	—		4 (Note: Appearances in FA Trophy)	0	46	1
Sutton United	2017–18	National League	2	0	0	0	—		0	0	2	0
Sutton United	Total		91	3	13	1	0	0	10	1	114	5
Bath City	2017–18	National League South	13	0	2	0	—		1	0	16	0
Career total			441	10	30	3	11	1	32	2	514	16

== Honours ==
Bristol City

- Football League Trophy runner-up: 1999–2000

Yeovil Town

- Football League Two: 2004–05

Sutton United

- National League South: 2015–16
