= Lee Matthews (footballer) =

English footballer

Personal information
- Full name: Lee Joseph Matthews
- Date of birth: 16 January 1979 (age 47)
- Place of birth: Middlesbrough, England
- Height: 6 ft 1 in (1.85 m)
- Position: Forward

Senior career*
Years	Team	Apps	(Gls)
1996–2001	Leeds United	3	(0)
1998	→ Notts County (loan	5	(0)
2000	→ Gillingham (loan)	5	(0)
2001–2004	Bristol City	43	(9)
2003–2004	→ Darlington (loan)	6	(1)
2004	→ Bristol Rovers (loan)	9	(0)
2004	→ Yeovil Town (loan)	4	(0)
2004–2006	Port Vale	34	(10)
2006–2007	Crewe Alexandra	10	(0)
2007	Livingston	5	(0)
Total		124	(20)
- * Club domestic league appearances and goals

Lee Joseph Matthews (born 16 January 1979) is an English former footballer who played as a striker.

He began his career with Leeds United in 1997 after winning the FA Youth Cup with the club's youth team. He transferred to Bristol City in 2001 after loan spells at Notts County and Gillingham. During three years with City, he was loaned out to Darlington, Bristol Rovers, and Yeovil Town. He signed with Port Vale in 2004 before moving on to Crewe Alexandra after a two-year stay. After leaving Crewe in 2007, he joined the Scottish club Livingston before retiring at 28. Dogged by injuries throughout his career, he was limited to a total of twenty goals in 138 league and cup appearances in his ten-year professional career—most of these appearances were as a substitute.

== Career ==
Matthews began his career with Leeds United in February 1996, and was part of the same generation of youth team players as Paul Robinson, Jonathan Woodgate, Alan Smith and others. He made three substitute appearances for Leeds in the Premier League in early 1998. His debut came in a 2–0 win over Crystal Palace at Selhurst Park on 31 January, as he replaced Jimmy Floyd Hasselbaink on 86 minutes. He made his Elland Road debut in a 1–0 defeat to Southampton on 28 February, replacing Alan Maybury again on 86 minutes. Four days later, he replaced Rod Wallace with one minute to go of a 1–0 victory over Tottenham Hotspur.

In late September 1998 he joined Notts County of the Second Division on a one-month loan deal. Playing competently, though not spectacularly, he returned to Elland Road after five appearances. Because of an injury, he had to wait until the end of March 2000 to see first-team action again, joining promotion chasing Gillingham on an end-of-season loan. He played five games, having a minimal impact in seeing the "Gills" reach the play-off final.

On 15 March, he joined Bristol City on loan after coming off the bench the next day to score against Millwall in a 2–1 win at Ashton Gate, he was signed permanently for £100,000 (initially £70,000, with a maximum bonus of £35,000 dependent on appearances) on 20 March. Three days later he did the same thing in a 3–1 win at Reading, his goal coming three minutes after coming onto the pitch. He was a back-up to first-choice pairing Lee Peacock and Tony Thorpe. A semi-regular in 2001–02, he scored just five goals, though Two of these came in a Bristol derby game on 9 January, City celebrating a 3–0 home win in the Football League Trophy. He also scored in City's Severnside derby victory over Cardiff City. However, he missed many games that season due to injury, including an ankle injury which required surgery. In April 2002 he was transfer listed by manager Danny Wilson, along with Mickey Bell, Mark Lever, Steve Jones and Simon Clist.

If injury was a niggling concern the previous season, the 2002–03 season was one blighted by injury. Sustaining a back injury in a 3–1 home defeat to Queens Park Rangers, he was taken off by Wilson, who stated: "It needed to be done because we can't afford to lose someone like Lee for a lengthy spell." However, the damage was done, a slipped disc, as it turned to be, booked him a lengthy spell on the sidelines. It took another ten months for Matthews to recover.

At the start of the 2003–04 season he was used almost exclusively as a substitute. In mid-December he joined Third Division side Darlington on a one-month loan. He played six games, scoring one goal against Carlisle United. Upon returning to Bristol he went straight into the first-team, though this was at Rovers rather than City. Wilson claimed this was to give Matthews a chance at regular football. Appreciated at The Memorial Stadium, Matthews considered making the move permanent. Caretaker manager Phil Bater was keen to oblige; however, the loan deal ended in March, Matthews having failed to score in nine games. He moved straight on to Yeovil Town, in a loan deal later extended to the end of the season. In June 2004 he was released by City, though manager Wilson soon followed him out the door.

In June 2004 he was signed to Port Vale, manager Martin Foyle looking to replace Scottish dynamo Stephen McPhee. Foyle and Matthews seemingly got off to a good start, Matthews claiming to be "really impressed" with Foyle. Despite being released by City, Matthews never held a grudge and his praise of the club persuaded Vale teammate Steve Brooker to sign with City in September 2004. He scored ten goals in 32 games for Vale during the 2004–05 season. This would prove to be his most successful season in terms of match fitness. The 2005–06 season was exceptionally poor for Matthews, his injury problems seemingly worsening, he played just three games. He was released upon the season's conclusion.

He spent the 2006–07 season with Crewe Alexandra, where again injuries severely limited his contribution, this time to ten appearances, all from the bench, never finding the net. He was once again released in the summer. He joined Livingston in August 2007, but was released shortly afterwards.

== Later and personal life ==
After retiring as a player, Matthews set up the football agency firm Sports Management International, along with Mark Obern.

His son, Ajay Matthews, played for Middlesbrough at youth team level and also represented England at under-17 level.

== Career statistics ==
Appearances and goals by club, season and competition
Club	Season	League			National cup (Note: Includes FA Cup, Scottish Cup)		League cup (Note: Includes Football League Cup, Scottish League Cup)		Other		Total	
Club	Season	Division	Apps	Goals	Apps	Goals	Apps	Goals	Apps	Goals	Apps	Goals
Leeds United	1997–98	Premier League	3	0	0	0	1	0	0	0	4	0
Leeds United	1998–99	Premier League	0	0	0	0	0	0	0	0	0	0
Leeds United	1999–2000	Premier League	0	0	0	0	0	0	0	0	0	0
Leeds United	2000–01	Premier League	0	0	0	0	0	0	0	0	0	0
Leeds United	Total		3	0	0	0	1	0	0	0	4	0
Notts County (loan)	1998–99	Second Division	5	0	—		0	0	0	0	5	0
Gillingham (loan)	1999–2000	Second Division	5	0	—		—		—		5	0
Bristol City	2000–01	Second Division	6	3	—		—		—		6	3
Bristol City	2001–02	Second Division	22	3	0	0	2	0	3 (Note: Appearance(s) in the EFL Trophy.)	2	27	5
Bristol City	2002–03	Second Division	7	1	0	0	1	0	0	0	8	1
Bristol City	2003–04	Second Division	8	2	2	1	2	0	1	0	13	3
Bristol City	Total		43	9	2	1	5	0	4	2	54	12
Darlington (loan)	2003–04	Third Division	6	1	0	0	0	0	0	0	6	1
Bristol Rovers (loan)	2003–04	Third Division	9	0	0	0	0	0	0	0	9	0
Yeovil Town (loan)	2003–04	Third Division	4	0	—		—		—		4	0
Port Vale	2004–05	League One	31	10	0	0	1	0	0	0	32	10
Port Vale	2005–06	League One	3	0	0	0	0	0	0	0	3	0
Port Vale	Total		34	10	0	0	1	0	0	0	35	10
Crewe Alexandra	2006–07	League One	10	0	0	0	0	0	0	0	10	0
Livingston	2007–08	Scottish First Division	5	0	0	0	0	0	1 (Note: Appearance(s) in the Scottish Challenge Cup.)	0	6	0
Career total			124	20	2	1	7	0	5	2	138	23
