= Louis Carey =

Former footballer

Personal information
- Full name: Louis Anthony Carey
- Date of birth: 22 January 1977 (age 49)
- Place of birth: Bristol, England
- Height: 5 ft 10 in (1.78 m)
- Position: Central defender

Team information
- Current team: Forest Green Rovers (assistant)

Youth career
- ?–1995: Bristol City

Senior career*
Years	Team	Apps	(Gls)
1995–2004	Bristol City	312	(5)
2004–2005	Coventry City	23	(0)
2005–2014	Bristol City	247	(7)
2015	Shepton Mallet	9	(1)
Total		591	(13)

International career
1998	Scotland U21	1	(0)
- * Club domestic league appearances and goals

Louis Anthony Carey (born 22 January 1977) is a professional football coach and former player who is the assistant manager of National League club Forest Green Rovers.

He played as a central defender, mostly for Bristol City. Carey, who was born in Bristol, was eligible to play for Scotland at international level through his grandparents, and played once for the Scotland U21 team.

== Career ==
Carey is a Bristol City supporter and came up through the ranks at Bristol City made his City debut in October 1995, and was a regular in the first team both as a right back and centre back for 9 seasons, and was part of the side which won promotion to the Championship in 1997–98. He signed a four-year deal in July 2000. He was part of the side that won the 2003 Football League Trophy final.

Carey spent 6 months at Coventry City under Peter Reid and was in and out of the first team, playing 27 games in all competitions, before then Bristol City manager Brian Tinnion signed him back after his contract was cancelled.

On 4 August 2012, Carey was given a testimonial against local rivals Bristol Rovers, which City won 3–0. Carey made his 500th appearance in all competitions for Bristol City on 15 March 2008.

In July 2013, Carey was three games shy of equalling John Atyeo's appearance record for the club, which he equalled in December 2013. On 29 December 2013, Carey made his 646th appearance for Bristol City to become the club's new record holder.

He left the club at the end of the 2013–14 season.

On 16 January 2015, Carey signed for Western Premier League side Shepton Mallet on a one-year deal.

Having been employed as the under-16s coach at Southampton, in July 2023, he departed Southampton to join Forest Green Rovers as assistant head coach.

== Career statistics ==
Appearances and goals by club, season and competition
Club	Season	League			National Cup		League Cup		Other		Total	
Club	Season	Division	Apps	Goals	Apps	Goals	Apps	Goals	Apps	Goals	Apps	Goals
Bristol City	1995–96	Second Division	16	0	0	0	0	0	0	0	16	0
Bristol City	1996–97	Second Division	43	0	1	0	3	0	0	0	47	0
Bristol City	1997–98	Second Division	37	0	2	0	2	0	2 (Note: Appearance(s) in Football League Trophy)	0	43	0
Bristol City	1998–99	First Division	41	0	1	0	3	0	0	0	45	0
Bristol City	1999–2000	Second Division	22	0	0	0	2	0	5	0	29	0
Bristol City	2000–01	Second Division	46	3	6	0	2	0	0	0	54	3
Bristol City	2001–02	Second Division	37	0	1	0	2	0	0	0	40	0
Bristol City	2002–03	Second Division	26	1	1	0	0	0	5	1	32	2
Bristol City	2003–04	Second Division	44	1	2	0	2	0	1	0	49	1
Bristol City	Total		312	5	14	0	16	0	13		355	6
Coventry City	2004–05	Championship	23	0	1	0	3	0	0	0	27	0
Bristol City	2004–05	League One	14	0	0	0	0	0	0	0	14	0
Bristol City	2005–06	League One	38	3	1	0	1	0	1	0	41	3
Bristol City	2006–07	League One	38	2	3	0	1	0	5	0	47	2
Bristol City	2007–08	Championship	33	0	0	0	1	0	3 (Note: Appearances in Football League Championship play-offs)	1	37	1
Bristol City	2008–09	Championship	28	0	2	0	2	1	0	0	32	1
Bristol City	2009–10	Championship	37	2	2	0	2	0	0	0	41	2
Bristol City	2010–11	Championship	21	0	0	0	0	0	0	0	21	0
Bristol City	2011–12	Championship	20	0	1	0	0	0	0	0	21	0
Bristol City	2012–13	Championship	16	0	1	0	0	0	0	0	17	0
Bristol City	2013–14	League One	2	0	1	0	0	0	1	0	4	0
Bristol City	Total		247	7	11	0	7	1	10		275	9
Shepton Mallet	2014–15	Western League Premier Division	9	1	0	0	0	0	0	0	9	1
Career total			591	13	26	0	26	1	23	2	666	16

== Honours ==
Bristol City

- Football League Trophy: 2002–03; runner-up: 1999–2000

Individual

- PFA Team of the Year: 2003–04 Second Division
