= Steve Torpey (footballer, born 1970) =

English footballer

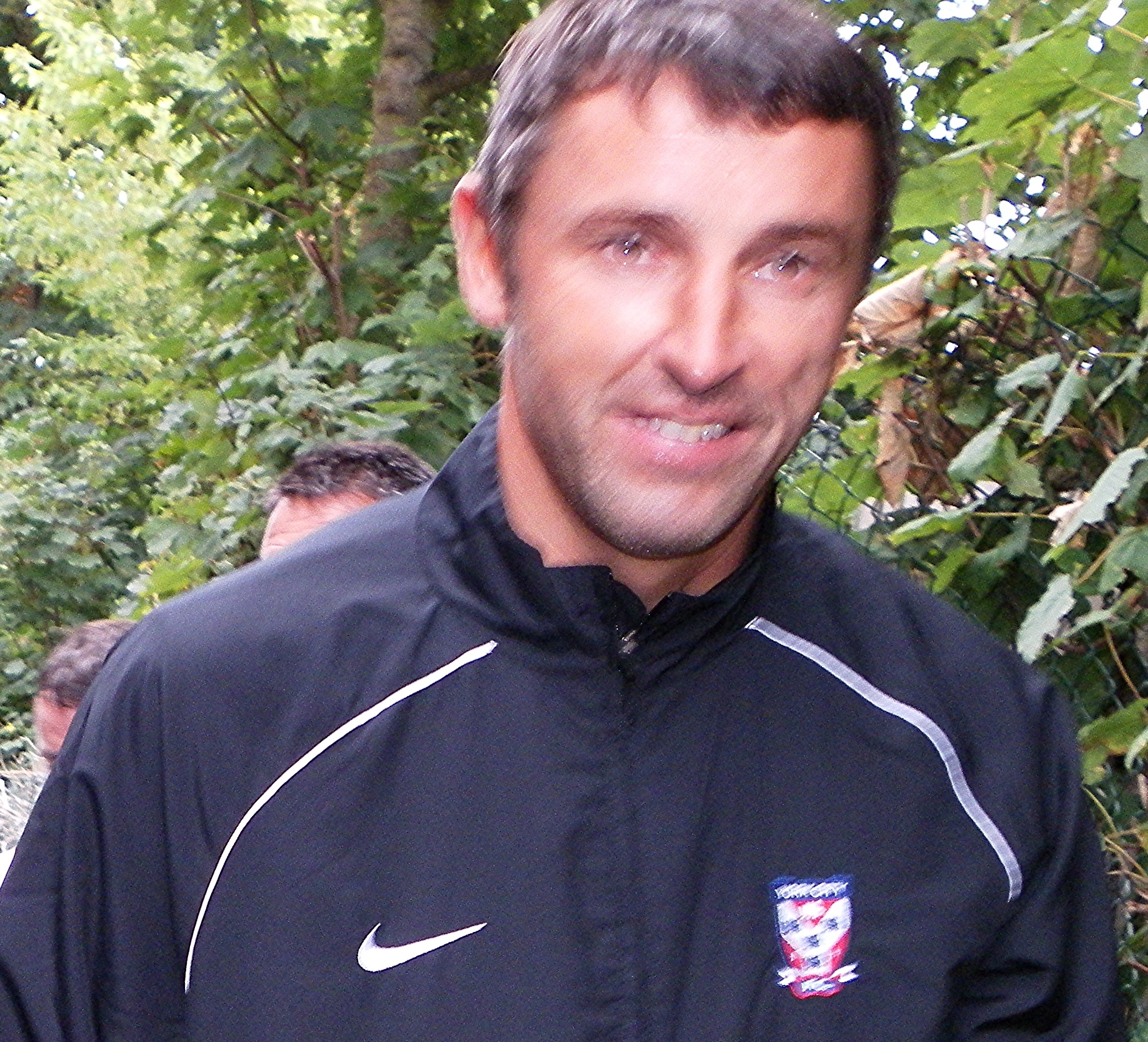
- Torpey with York City in 2013

Personal information
- Full name: Stephen David James Torpey
- Date of birth: 8 December 1970 (age 55)
- Place of birth: Islington, England
- Height: 6 ft 3 in (1.91 m)
- Position: Striker

Youth career
- –1989: Millwall

Senior career*
Years	Team	Apps	(Gls)
1989–1990	Millwall	7	(0)
1990–1993	Bradford City	96	(22)
1993–1997	Swansea City	162	(44)
1997–2000	Bristol City	70	(13)
1998	→ Notts County (loan)	6	(1)
2000–2007	Scunthorpe United	239	(61)
2007–2008	Lincoln City	13	(0)
2007–2008	→ Farsley Celtic (loan)	6	(1)
2008	Farsley Celtic	18	(2)
2008	North Ferriby United	15	(2)
2009	York City	2	(0)
2010–2011	York City	0	(0)
Total		634	(146)

Managerial career
- 2010: York City (caretaker)
- 2014: York City (caretaker)
- * Club domestic league appearances and goals

Stephen David James Torpey (born 8 December 1970) is an English former professional footballer who played as a striker.

== Playing career ==
Born in Islington, London, Torpey had played for a number of clubs, before signing for Scunthorpe United from Bristol City in February 2000. He was Scunthorpe's record transfer signing, costing £175,000. Torpey broke the ten goal barrier in each of his first five seasons at Scunthorpe and represented the club over 250 times.

He was released at the end of the 2006–07 season, after only playing a small part in the club's promotion to the Championship. He subsequently signed for League Two side Lincoln City on a one-year contract on 27 June 2007, but was loaned out to Conference Premier side Farsley Celtic on 20 November until 7 January 2008. He was released by Lincoln on this date and joined Farsley on a permanent contract. He later joined the backroom staff at the club. He found himself consigned to the bench at the start of the 2008–09 season and, after making just two substitute appearances, moved on to North Ferriby United of the Northern Premier League Premier Division. He made his Ferriby debut as a substitute in a 2–1 home defeat to Kendal Town on 6 September 2008. With Ferriby he made 23 appearances and scored five goals in all competitions.

== Coaching career ==
Torpey was appointed as youth-team coach at York City on 15 December 2008 on a part-time basis, as this would allow him to continue training apprentices at Hull City. He offered his services as a player for York in April 2009 and he came on as a 79th-minute substitute in a 1–0 victory over Eastbourne Borough on 18 April. He started the last game of the Conference Premier season, a 1–1 draw at Lewes on 26 April 2009, which was his last appearance as a player. He resumed his playing career after being registered by York on 3 September 2010. Following Martin Foyle's resignation on 24 September 2010 Torpey took over as assistant to caretaker manager Andy Porter, before becoming caretaker manager on 8 October following Porter's departure. His first and only game in charge came the following day with a 4–0 defeat away at Newport County, and his tenure ended on 13 October 2010 when Tamworth manager Gary Mills was appointed.

After Nigel Worthington was appointed manager, Torpey was given the position of first-team coach on 5 March 2013, and after Worthington signed a new contract as manager on 3 May, Torpey was promoted to the position of assistant manager. After Worthington resigned as manager of York on 13 October 2014 Torpey took over as caretaker manager, but resumed his role as assistant manager after his former Scunthorpe teammate Russ Wilcox was appointed manager on 16 October 2014. He parted company with York on 11 May 2015, but returned to the club as youth-team coach on 17 December. On 29 March 2018, it was announced that he was leaving as he had accepted a post with the Professional Footballers' Association as a coach educator.

== Career statistics ==
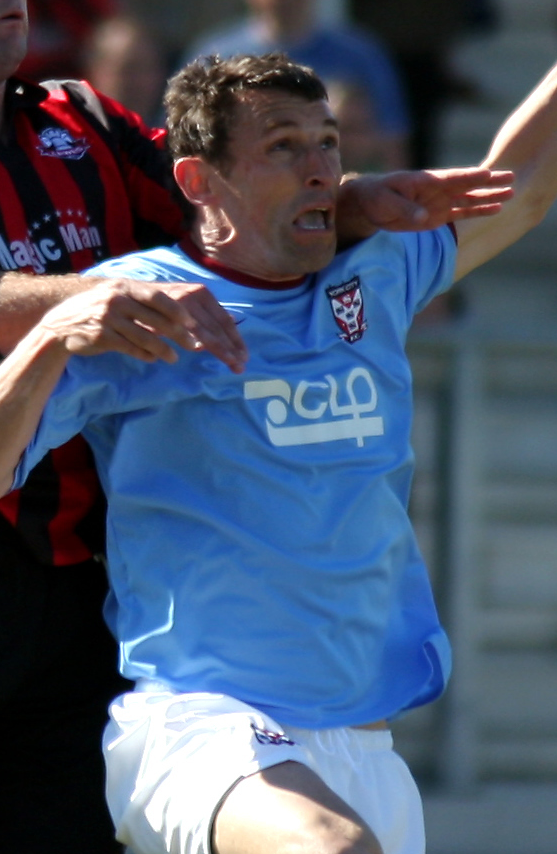
Torpey playing for York City in 2009

Appearances and goals by club, season and competition
Club	Season	League			FA Cup		League Cup		Other		Total	
Club	Season	Division	Apps	Goals	Apps	Goals	Apps	Goals	Apps	Goals	Apps	Goals
Millwall	1989–90	First Division	7	0	0	0	1	0	0	0	8	0
Bradford City	1990–91	Third Division	29	7	0	0	0	0	3 (Note: Appearances in Associate Members Cup)	3	32	10
Bradford City	1991–92	Third Division	43	10	2	0	4	0	2	2	51	12
Bradford City	1992–93	Third Division	24	5	1	0	2	0	3 (Note: Appearance(s) in Football League Trophy)	1	30	6
Bradford City	Total		96	22	3	0	6	0	8	6	113	28
Swansea City	1993–94	Second Division	40	9	2	2	4	1	7	1	53	13
Swansea City	1994–95	Second Division	41	11	5	2	1	0	3	2	50	15
Swansea City	1995–96	Second Division	42	15	1	0	2	1	3	1	48	17
Swansea City	1996–97	Third Division	39	9	2	1	2	0	5 (Note: Two appearances in Football League Trophy, three appearances and one goal in Third Division play-offs)	1	48	11
Swansea City	Total		162	44	10	5	9	2	18	5	199	56
Bristol City	1997–98	Second Division	29	8	1	0	2	0	2	0	34	8
Bristol City	1998–99	First Division	21	4	1	0	—		—		22	4
Bristol City	1999–2000	Second Division	20	1	1	0	3	1	2	0	26	2
Bristol City	Total		70	13	3	0	5	1	4	0	82	14
Notts County (loan)	1998–99	Second Division	6	1	—		2	1	—		8	2
Scunthorpe United	1999–2000	Second Division	15	1	—		—		—		15	1
Scunthorpe United	2000–01	Third Division	40	11	4	1	2	1	0	0	46	13
Scunthorpe United	2001–02	Third Division	39	12	3	0	0	0	3	2	45	14
Scunthorpe United	2002–03	Third Division	28	12	4	3	1	1	3 (Note: One appearance and one goal in Football League Trophy, two appearances in Third Division play-offs)	1	36	17
Scunthorpe United	2003–04	Third Division	43	11	5	3	2	0	4	1	54	15
Scunthorpe United	2004–05	League Two	34	12	2	0	0	0	1	1	37	13
Scunthorpe United	2005–06	League One	26	1	1	0	1	0	1	0	29	1
Scunthorpe United	2006–07	League One	14	1	1	0	1	1	2	0	18	2
Scunthorpe United	Total		239	61	20	7	7	3	14	5	280	76
Lincoln City	2007–08	League Two	13	0	0	0	1	0	0	0	14	0
Farsley Celtic	2007–08	Conference Premier	22	3	—		—		5 (Note: Four appearances in FA Trophy, one in Conference League Cup)	0	27	3
Farsley Celtic	2008–09	Conference North	2	0	—		—		—		2	0
Farsley Celtic	Total		24	3	—		—		5	0	29	3
North Ferriby United	2008–09	NPL Premier Division	15	2	3	2	—		5 (Note: Four appearances in FA Trophy, one appearance and one goal in East Riding Senior Cup)	1	23	5
York City	2008–09	Conference Premier	2	0	—		—		—		2	0
Career total			634	146	39	14	31	7	54	17	758	184

== Managerial statistics ==
As of 15 October 2014

Managerial record by team and tenure
Team	From	To	Record					Ref
Team	From	To	P	W	D	L	Win %	Ref
York City (caretaker)	8 October 2010	13 October 2010	1	0	0	1	0.0	
York City (caretaker)	13 October 2014	15 October 2014	0	0	0	0	—	
Total			1	0	0	1	0.0	—

== Honours ==
Swansea City

- Football League Trophy: 1993–94

Scunthorpe United

- Football League One: 2006–07
