= Christian Roberts (footballer) =

Welsh footballer

Personal information
- Date of birth: 22 October 1979 (age 47)
- Place of birth: Cardiff, Wales
- Positions: Winger; striker

Senior career*
Years	Team	Apps	(Gls)
1997–2000	Cardiff City	23	(3)
1999	→ Hereford United (loan)	9	(2)
2000	→ Drogheda United (loan)	6	(0)
2000–2002	Exeter City	79	(18)
2002–2004	Bristol City	94	(20)
2004–2008	Swindon Town	111	(21)
2009–2011	Maesteg Park	5	(0)
2011	Haverfordwest County	7	(0)
Total		328	(64)
- * Club domestic league appearances and goals

Christian Roberts (born 22 October 1979) is a Welsh former professional footballer. He was most notable for his four-year spell at Swindon Town, which was disrupted by various injuries and misfortunes. In addition to Swindon, his career saw him play for Cardiff City, Hereford United, Drogheda United, Exeter City, Bristol City, Maesteg Park and Haverfordwest County. He was predominantly a winger, usually playing on the right wing, but he also played as a striker.

== Career ==
=== Early career ===
Christian made a name for himself at Exeter City where he scored 18 goals in 67 appearances before Bristol City decided to snap him up. He had joined Exeter from Cardiff City where he began his career as a trainee. However, he never fully established himself in the squad and was sold after being loaned out to Hereford United and Drogheda United. During his time at Bristol City, memorable moments include a hat-trick against Barnsley and the winner in a thrilling 5–4 win over Mansfield Town (his second of the game). He was also part of the side that won the 2003 Football League Trophy Final.

=== Swindon Town ===
After a deal for Darius Henderson fell through, Swindon Town's manager Andy King signed Roberts from local rivals Bristol City, initially for £20,000, with an extra £30,000 being paid in installments based on appearances and performances. Roberts made his debut the following Saturday, scoring the winner for the Town in a 1–0 win over Oldham Athletic on 16 October 2004. His second goal came just a week later, in a 2–2 draw at Barnsley Prior to the Football League Trophy match against Bristol City, his car was hit by a bus, then crashed into another car as he pulled out of a petrol station, resulting in Roberts suffering minor whiplash and bruising, and causing him to miss both the Bristol game, and the following FA Cup tie with Notts County. Shortly afterwards, however, he sustained what was the worst injury of his career. Initially believed to be a groin injury, it was eventually diagnosed as a hernia, requiring surgery, and Roberts was ruled out for two months. At the end of the season, Roberts had played 21 league games, scoring 3 goals.

His second season would prove to be less successful. In January 2006, it was announced that Roberts had been admitted to the Sporting Chance clinic, suffering from alcohol dependence. He made 21 appearances in the league that season, scoring 3 goals – but only started four games, as opposed to the seventeen of the previous season. The 2006/07 season started much more brightly, with Roberts winning the League Two Player of the Month award for August, for which he thanked former Swindon manager Iffy Onuora for keeping faith in him. Following Paul Sturrock's decision to convert Roberts into a striker, he had his most successful Swindon season, scoring 13 goals in all competitions, and signing a new two-year contract. This season would prove to be less successful, with Roberts suffering a knee injury that required surgery early in the season, Although recovering from the injury and returning to the team, scoring his fifth league goal of the season in January 2008 against Luton (a goal which took Swindon's unbeaten run to ten games), he was once again forced out with a knee injury in March. He finished the season having played 27 league games, with five goals.

On 25 September 2008, Roberts announced that he was retiring from professional football after he failed to recover from the knee injury, with an attempted surgery being unsuccessful. Roberts had a testimonial match on 11 February 2009, held between Swindon and an all-star Chelsea team, containing Gianfranco Zola and Roberto Di Matteo, amongst other ex-Chelsea players, with the money raised going to Cancer Research UK. The game finished with the Chelsea All-Stars winning 3–2, Zola scoring a hat-trick.

=== Return to Wales ===
In August 2009, Roberts joined Welsh Football League Division Two side Maesteg Park. In January 2011, he signed for Welsh Premier side Haverfordwest County. He retired from football, for the second time, at the end of the season, departing football for a period of time, before returning as an anti-racism ambassador.

=== International ===
Roberts was called up to the senior Wales squad in May 2003 to play United States but was unused and ultimately never capped at that level.

== Other works ==
In 2010, Roberts published his biography "Life Is A Game of Inches".

He also works as a Sessional education worker with anti-racism charity – Show Racism the Red Card.

== Honours ==
Bristol City

- Football League Trophy: 2002–03
