= Matt Hill (English footballer) =

English footballer (born 1981)

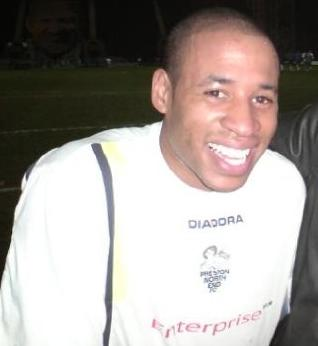

Personal information
- Full name: Matthew Clayton Hill
- Date of birth: 26 March 1981 (age 45)
- Place of birth: Bristol, England
- Height: 5 ft 7 in (1.70 m)
- Position: Defender

Youth career
- –1996: Manor Farm Boys Club
- 1996–1998: Bristol City

Senior career*
Years	Team	Apps	(Gls)
1998–2005	Bristol City	203	(6)
2005–2008	Preston North End	105	(0)
2008–2010	Wolverhampton Wanderers	15	(0)
2010	→ Queens Park Rangers (loan)	16	(0)
2010–2011	Barnsley	23	(2)
2011–2012	Blackpool	4	(0)
2012	→ Sheffield United (loan)	12	(0)
2012–2014	Sheffield United	66	(0)
2014–2016	Tranmere Rovers	42	(1)
2016–2019	Bradford Park Avenue	49	(2)
2019–2022	Stafford Rangers	21	(1)
Total		556	(12)

Managerial career
- 2021–2023: Stafford Rangers
- * Club domestic league appearances and goals

Matthew Clayton Hill (born 26 March 1981) is an English former footballer who played as a defender. Born in Bristol, Hill started his career with Bristol City where he made over 200 appearances. He subsequently joined Preston North End where he also spent a successful spell, playing over 100 times for the Lancashire club. A move to Wolverhampton Wanderers followed but first team opportunities were more limited and he was loaned to Queens Park Rangers before leaving to join Barnsley. After only one season at the South Yorkshire club he transferred to Blackpool but again played few first team games before being loaned to Sheffield United, with the move being made permanent in the summer of 2012. He managed non-league Stafford Rangers F.C. from 2021 to 2023

== Career ==
=== Bristol City ===
Hill began his professional career at his home town club Bristol City, making his debut aged 17 on 7 November 1998 in a 6–1 defeat to Wolves. He progressed to become a first choice player by the 2000–01 season, claiming both the Player of the Year and Young Player of the Year honour at Ashton Gate in the same season in 2001–02 season. He twice came close to winning promotion with the Robins from the third tier, but they lost in the play-offs for two successive seasons.

=== Preston North End ===
The defender finally moved up a division when he joined Preston North End in January 2005 in a £100,000 deal. His first season almost ended with a place in the Premier League, but it was third time unlucky for Hill in the play-offs as Preston lost the final to West Ham. The following season brought more disappointment as injury ruled him out of the final month, where the club once again missed out in the play-offs. He recovered for the 2006–07 season and went on to win the Preston fans' Player of the Year Award.

=== Wolverhampton Wanderers ===
Hill joined Wolverhampton Wanderers on 1 September 2008 signing a three-year deal for an undisclosed fee. Hill contested the left–back slot with Stephen Ward throughout the season, but made 13 appearances in helping Wolves win promotion to the Premier League as champions.

After making only two appearances in the top flight, Hill was loaned to Championship side Queens Park Rangers in January 2010 for the remainder of the 2009–10 campaign.

=== Barnsley ===
In October 2010. Hill joined Championship side Barnsley on a one-month emergency loan deal after full-back Jay McEveley picked up an injury. He suffered a foot fracture which led to him returning to Molineux for treatment, before returning to Barnsley in the New Year.

In January 2011, his contract with Wolves was terminated by mutual consent and it was later announced that he had signed a deal until the end of the season with Barnsley.

Hill scored his first goal in seven years in the 2–2 draw with Nottingham Forest on 1 January, latching onto a pass and thumping across Lee Camp. He emulated this feat in the 3–3 draw with Leeds United in February.

=== Blackpool ===
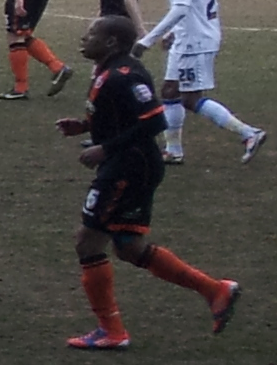
Matt Hill playing for Sheffield United in March 2013.

Hill's contract with Barnsley expired in May 2011 and he left the club. He joined Blackpool on 9 July, and played his first game with the club on 11 August in a goalless League Cup tie with Sheffield Wednesday. Hill made his first League start in a home game against Derby County on 17 August. On 6 March 2012, Hill joined Football League One side Sheffield United on loan until the end of the season to ease a defensive crisis at the club. He started regularly from that point, eventually making fifteen appearances for the South Yorkshire club. His final appearance for the Blades came at Wembley Stadium for the League One play-off final. Hill scored in the game's penalty shoot out when the game was level after extra time but United slipped to defeat.

=== Sheffield United ===
Having been released by Blackpool, Hill signed a permanent deal with Sheffield United at the end of July 2012. Having been a regular in the starting XI for most of the season, Hill was ruled out for 6 weeks with a broken jaw in January 2013. Hill eventually returned to the side in March and played regularly until the end of the season, finishing having made 41 appearances in all competitions.

During the 2013–14 season, Hill was largely used as a substitute by new managers David Weir and Nigel Clough, starting occasional games as cover for other defenders. Despite this Hill made a further 39 appearances for the Blades during the season. In May 2014, with the season over, Hill announced that he would be leaving United as his contract had expired, stating that "I am sad to say I am leaving Sheffield United. I have had a fantastic time with the lads, staff and fans." Hill played 95 times in total for United.

=== Tranmere Rovers ===
Hill joined Tranmere Rovers on a non contract basis in August 2014. After five appearances he signed a one-year contract with Rovers. Two weeks later Hill picked up the Achilles tendon injury against Newport County that forced him to miss the next six months. He recovered by the end of the season making substitute appearance at Mansfield on 14 April. Hill returned to the starting eleven against Plymouth, however Tranmere lost 2-3 which confirmed their relegation to the National League. After the end of the season he signed a new six-month contract with Rovers.

== Personal life ==
His son James Hill is also a footballer as is his cousin, Scott Golbourne.

== Career statistics ==
As of match played 16 December 2017

Appearances and goals by club, season and competition
Club	Season	League			FA Cup		League Cup		Other		Total	
Club	Season	Division	Apps	Goals	Apps	Goals	Apps	Goals	Apps	Goals	Apps	Goals
Bristol City	1998–99	First Division	3	0	0	0	0	0	—		3	0
Bristol City	1999–2000	Second Division	14	0	0	0	0	0	5 (Note: Appearances in Football League Trophy)	0	19	0
Bristol City	2000–01	Second Division	34	0	6	0	1	0	0	0	41	0
Bristol City	2001–02	Second Division	40	1	1	0	2	0	5	0	48	1
Bristol City	2002–03	Second Division	44	3	3	0	1	0	6	0	54	3
Bristol City	2003–04	Second Division	45	2	3	0	2	0	1	0	51	2
Bristol City	2004–05	League One	23	0	2	0	2	0	3	0	30	0
Bristol City	Total		203	6	15	0	8	0	20	0	246	6
Preston North End	2004–05	Championship	14	0	—		—		3 (Note: Appearances in Championship play-offs)	0	17	0
Preston North End	2005–06	Championship	26	0	2	0	1	0	—		29	0
Preston North End	2006–07	Championship	38	0	3	0	1	0	—		42	0
Preston North End	2007–08	Championship	26	0	2	0	1	0	—		29	0
Preston North End	2008–09	Championship	1	0	0	0	1	0	—		2	0
Preston North End	Total		105	0	7	0	4	0	3	0	119	0
Wolverhampton Wanderers	2008–09	Championship	13	0	1	0	—		—		14	0
Wolverhampton Wanderers	2009–10	Premier League	2	0	0	0	1	0	—		3	0
Wolverhampton Wanderers	Total		15	0	1	0	1	0	0	0	17	0
Queens Park Rangers (loan)	2009–10	Championship	16	0	0	0	—		—		16	0
Barnsley	2010–11	Championship	23	2	1	0	0	0	—		24	2
Blackpool	2011–12	Championship	4	0	0	0	1	0	—		5	0
Sheffield United	2011–12	League One	12	0	0	0	—		3 (Note: Appearances in League One play-offs)	0	15	0
Sheffield United	2012–13	League One	34	0	3	0	0	0	4 (Note: Two appearances in Football League Trophy and two in League One play-offs)	0	41	0
Sheffield United	2013–14	League One	32	0	7	0	0	0	0	0	39	0
Sheffield United	Total		78	0	10	0	0	0	7	0	95	0
Tranmere Rovers	2014–15	League Two	11	0	0	0	1	0	0	0	12	0
Tranmere Rovers	2015–16	National League	31	1	2	0	—		0	0	33	1
Tranmere Rovers	Total		42	1	2	0	1	0	0	0	45	1
Bradford Park Avenue	2016–17	National League North	37	2	0	0	—		0	0	37	2
Bradford Park Avenue	2017–18	National League North	12	0	0	0	—		0	0	12	0
Bradford Park Avenue	Total		49	2	0	0	0	0	0	0	49	2
Career total			535	11	38	0	16	0	30	0	619	11

== Honours ==
Bristol City

- Football League Trophy: 2002–03; runner-up: 1999–2000

Wolverhampton Wanderers

- Football League Championship: 2008–09
