= Colin Cramb =

Scottish footballer

Personal information
- Full name: Colin Cramb
- Date of birth: 23 June 1974 (age 52)
- Place of birth: Lanark, Scotland
- Height: 5 ft 11 in (1.80 m)
- Position: Striker

Senior career*
Years	Team	Apps	(Gls)
1991–1993	Hamilton Academical	48	(10)
1993–1994	Southampton	1	(0)
1994–1995	Falkirk	8	(1)
1995	Heart of Midlothian	6	(1)
1995–1997	Doncaster Rovers	62	(25)
1997–1999	Bristol City	54	(10)
1999	→ Walsall (loan)	4	(4)
1999–2001	Crewe Alexandra	50	(10)
2000	→ Notts County (loan)	3	(0)
2001	→ Bury (loan)	15	(5)
2001–2003	Fortuna Sittard	23	(5)
2003	→ Bury (loan)	19	(3)
2003–2004	Shrewsbury Town	37	(12)
2004–2005	Grimsby Town	11	(2)
2005	Hamilton Academical	9	(2)
2005–2006	Stenhousemuir	27	(16)
2006–2008	Stirling Albion	53	(18)
2008–2009	East Stirlingshire	20	(9)
2015	Brislington	1	(1)
Total		448	(125)
- * Club domestic league appearances and goals

Colin Cramb (born 23 June 1974 in Lanark) is a Scottish former professional footballer and coach who played as a forward from 1991 and 2009.

He notably played for Hamilton Academical, Doncaster Rovers, Bristol City and Stirling Albion. Cramb also had spells with Southampton, Falkirk, Hearts, Walsall, Crewe Alexandra, Notts County, Bury, Fortuna Sittard, Shrewsbury Town, Grimsby Town, Stenhousemuir and East Stirlingshire. Cramb is the only player to have played in all four divisions in both England and Scotland.

== Playing career ==
Cramb began his career as a junior with Hamilton Academical, playing 53 times before a transfer to Southampton in June 1993 for a fee of £60,000. He made one Premiership appearance at The Dell, against Everton as a substitute, but enjoyed a good season in the reserves before joining Falkirk in August 1994 for a fee of £50,000.

He moved to Heart of Midlothian in March 1995, Hearts paying £45,000 for Cramb plus Maurice Johnston going in the opposite direction. He played six times for Hearts before a £25,000 move to Doncaster Rovers where he became a regular goalscorer, scoring 25 times in just 62 games to earn a £125,000 move to Bristol City in August 1997. He was a regular in his first season at Ashton Gate when he helped the club gain promotion to the first division (now known as the Championship), but was out of favour in the 1998–99 season due to the form of Ade Akinbiyi and Søren Andersen. In February 1999, Cramb spent a month on loan with Walsall and moved to Crewe Alexandra in August 1999 for a fee of £250,000.

Cramb had loan spells with Notts County (September 2000) and Bury (February–May 2001) before leaving Crewe on a Bosman to join Dutch premier side Fortuna Sittard in June 2001. He played well in the Netherlands but sustained a cruciate ligament injury in March 2002. The club were later relegated and at the start of the following season they hit financial problems and were forced to release players. Cramb returned to Scotland to recover and regain his fitness, training with Hamilton Academical and featuring in reserve games as a trialist for Livingston and St Johnstone.

In January 2003, Cramb returned to England, joining Bury until the end of the season. In July 2003 Cramb signed for Shrewsbury Town, scoring 12 times in 35 games before joining Grimsby Town in September 2004. He struggled to establish himself at Blundell Park and returned to his first club, Hamilton Academical in January 2005. He is the only Hamilton player to have scored in the first team at old Douglas Park and New Douglas Park.

In June 2005 he joined Stenhousemuir, scoring 16 times in just 27 league games as Stenhousemuir battled, unsuccessfully, to gain promotion from the Scottish Third Division. He left Stenhousemuir in July 2006 to join Stirling Albion, his 15th professional football club. Cramb was released at the end of the 2007–08 season, after which he signed for East Stirlingshire.

Having moved to Bristol, early 2015 seen Cramb sign for local Western League side Brislington, where he scored on his debut against Bradford Town.

== Coaching career ==
Cramb left East Stirlingshire at the end of season 2008–09 and retired from pro football at 35. In season 2009–10 he turned out in frequent charity matches for the Hearts veterans and charity XI alongside players like Gary Mackay, John Robertson and Jose Quitongo. He has also turned out for his local amateur side on occasion.

Cramb currently resides in Bristol, and after completing his coaching badges he is now a registered football coach.
