= Matthew Hewlett =

English footballer

Personal information
- Full name: Matthew Paul Hewlett
- Date of birth: 25 February 1976 (age 50)
- Place of birth: Bristol, England
- Height: 6 ft 2 in (1.88 m)
- Position: Midfielder

Team information
- Current team: Tiverton Town

Youth career
- –1993: Bristol City

Senior career*
Years	Team	Apps	(Gls)
1993–2000	Bristol City	127	(9)
1998	→ Burnley (loan)	2	(0)
2000–2005	Swindon Town	181	(6)
2005–2007	Torquay United	24	(1)
2007–?	Tiverton Town		
- * Club domestic league appearances and goals

Matthew Paul Hewlett (born 25 February 1976) is an English former professional footballer who played as a midfielder.

== Career ==
Matt began his career as trainee with his local side Bristol City, turning professional in August 1993. He joined Burnley on loan in November 1998, playing three times in a short three week spell. Hewlett left Ashton Gate in July 2000, joining local rivals Swindon Town on a free transfer. He became the club captain at Swindon, before spending time out with a knee injury.

In July 2005 he moved to Torquay United, again on a free transfer. However, he struggled to establish himself fully at Plainmoor, mainly due to spending a long time out of the side with a serious back injury, which eventually forced his retirement on 2 February 2007.

On 29 September 2007 Hewlett played for Tiverton Town in their friendly against Buckland Athletic, after which Tiverton manager Martyn Rogers stated he was keen to sign Hewlett. Rogers managed to sign Hewlett on 18 October along with another player, Radley Veale.

Hewlett spent summer 2009 on trial at Yate Town.

== After football ==
He was appointed as a youth scout for Bristol City in March 2022.
