= Scott Murray (footballer, born 1974) =

Scottish footballer

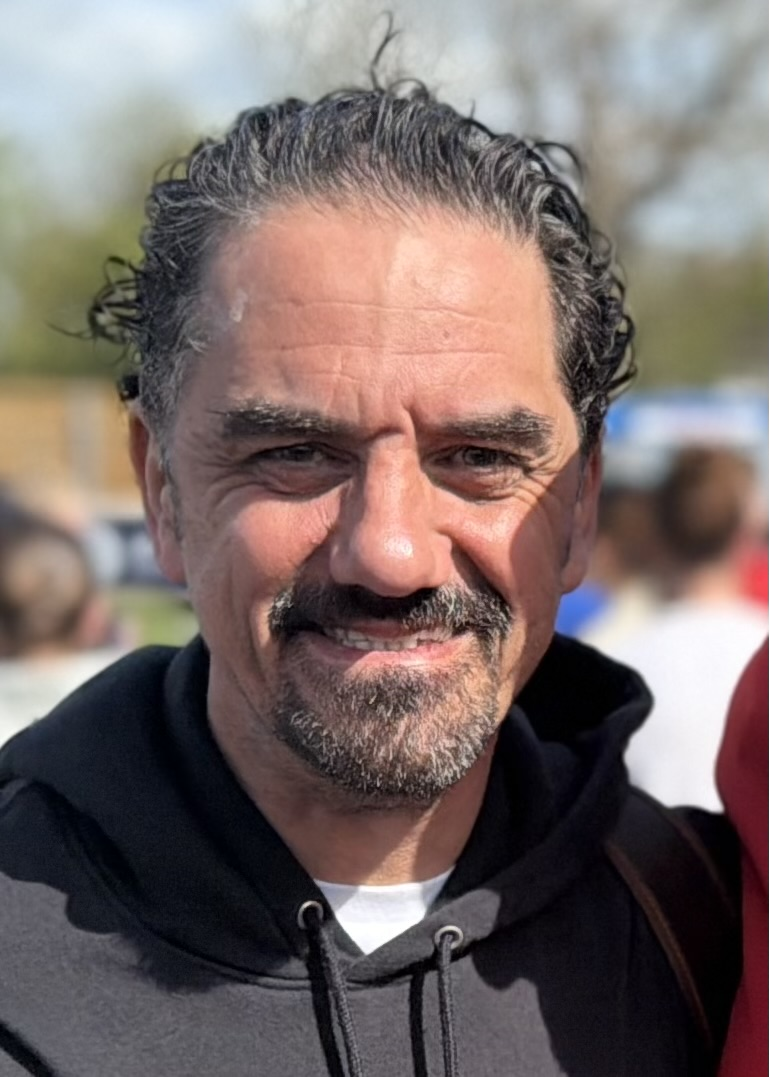
- Murray in 2026.

Personal information
- Full name: Scott George Murray
- Date of birth: 26 May 1974 (age 52)
- Place of birth: Fraserburgh, Scotland
- Position: Winger

Senior career*
Years	Team	Apps	(Gls)
1990–1994	Fraserburgh	122	(34)
1994–1997	Aston Villa	4	(0)
1997–2003	Bristol City	230	(46)
2003–2004	Reading	34	(5)
2004–2009	Bristol City	124	(28)
2008	→ Cheltenham Town (loan)	13	(2)
2009–2010	Yeovil Town	20	(2)
2010–2012	Bath City	68	(14)
2012–2013	Clevedon Town	21	(12)
Total		493	(97)

International career
2004	Scotland B	1	(0)
- * Club domestic league appearances and goals

Scott George Murray (born 26 May 1974) is a Scottish former professional footballer. A goalscoring winger, he is best known for playing in over 400 competitive first team games for Bristol City. At Bristol City he made the end of season Football League Second Division Team of the Year in 3 consecutive seasons. In the last of they 3 seasons he won the 2003 Football League Trophy final. He is a Bristol City Hall of Fame inductee. He also played for Fraserburgh, Aston Villa, Reading, Cheltenham Town, Yeovil Town and Bath City. He is now Bristol City kitman.

== Club career ==
Born in Fraserburgh, Aberdeenshire, Murray made his debut at his local Highland League club Fraserburgh aged 16. He played there for the first-team for four years while working full-time in a local fish processing factory.

After scoring in a trial game for Liverpool's reserves, Graeme Souness was shortly sacked as first-team manager. Aston Villa stepped in. Murray scored the quickest ever hat-trick in the Premiership reserve league, with his three strikes coming inside the first 12 minutes. Villa paid Fraserburgh £35,000 (at the time, the biggest fee received by a Highland League club for a transfer) for his services. During his three years at Villa Park, Murray made only four first team league appearances.

He was signed by Bristol City from Aston Villa in December 1997. He was City's top scorer in the 2002–03 season. That season he was part of the side that won the 2003 Football League Trophy final.

He next joined Reading for £650,000 in June 2003. There he was a first team regular for Alan Pardew.

In March 2004, he rejoined Bristol City. Murray's return boosted City's form but they lost in that season's playoff final to Brighton & Hove Albion. He was made club captain during Brian Tinnion's spell as manager. In the 2006–07 season, City were drawn against Premier League side Middlesbrough in the FA Cup. Murray scored a chip against Australian number one Mark Schwarzer to earn the Robins a 2–2 draw at Ashton Gate, however they eventually lost the tie on penalties in the replay. A key player in City's promotion push despite a stress fracture to his fourth metatarsal bone restricting him to 37 appearances, he signed a new one-year extension to his contract.

On 15 September, Murray became new Cheltenham Town manager Martin Allen's first signing on an emergency one-month loan, returning to Bristol City on 15 December. Murray was released by Bristol City in May 2009.

On 1 July, it was confirmed that he had signed a one-year contract with Yeovil Town becoming manager Terry Skiverton's third summer signing. He scored a brace in the 2–2 home draw with Brighton to rescue a point, with goals either side of half time bringing up his 100th and 101st career goals. He was released by Yeovil along with three other players on 13 May 2010.

Murray signed for part-time Football Conference side Bath City on a 12-month deal so that he could focus on his coaching role at Bristol City.

In August of 2012, Murray signed for Clevedon Town and retired from football in the following July.

== International ==
Murray was capped by the Scotland B team, coming on as a substitute against Germany.

== Honours ==
Bristol City

- Football League Trophy: 2002–03; runner-up: 1999–2000

Individual

- PFA Team of the Year: 2000–01 Second Division, 2001–02 Second Division, 2002–03 Second Division
