= Tommy Doherty =

Northern Irish footballer (born 1979)

Personal information
- Full name: Thomas Edward Doherty
- Date of birth: 17 March 1979 (age 47)
- Place of birth: Bristol, England
- Position: Midfielder

Senior career*
Years	Team	Apps	(Gls)
1996–2005	Bristol City	189	(7)
2005–2008	Queens Park Rangers	15	(0)
2006	→ Yeovil Town (loan)	1	(0)
2006–2007	→ Wycombe Wanderers (loan)	26	(2)
2007–2008	→ Wycombe Wanderers (loan)	5	(0)
2008–2010	Wycombe Wanderers	65	(0)
2010	Ferencvárosi TC	11	(0)
2010–2011	Bradford City	18	(0)
2011–2012	Newport County	19	(0)
2012	Bath City	1	(0)
2012–2014	Exeter City	30	(0)
Total		380	(9)

International career
2003	Northern Ireland B	1	(0)
2003–2005	Northern Ireland	9	(0)
- * Club domestic league appearances and goals

Thomas Edward Doherty (born 17 March 1979 in Bristol) is a Northern Ireland former professional footballer who played as a midfielder. He made nine appearances for the Northern Ireland national team.

== Club career ==
Doherty started his career at Bristol City, making 189 league appearances in nine years. He was part of the side that won the 2003 Football League Trophy Final, before moving to Queens Park Rangers in 2005. He joined Wycombe on loan from QPR in September 2006 and was named in the PFA League Two Team of the Year for the 2006–07 season. He was also named the supporters official player of the year.

In the summer of 2007 Wycombe tried to sign him but for many reasons a deal was never agreed. He then suffered an illness whilst on holiday which put an end to negotiations. Doherty re-joined the club on another loan deal in October 2007 and joined the club permanently in January 2008 when he was released from QPR. Further impressive performances from Doherty saw Wycombe promoted to Football League One as well as himself being named in the PFA League Two Team of the Year for the second time at the end of the 2008–09 season.

On 30 January 2010, Doherty signed a contract with Ferencvárosi TC until the end of the season. He made his debut in a friendly against Gozo F.C. in which Ferencvárosi won 11–0.

It was announced on 28 May 2010, that Doherty would be signing with English League Two side Bradford City on a two-year contract. He was released from his contract on 4 May 2011, with immediate effect.

Doherty signed for Newport County on 11 June 2011 and was released by Newport in January 2012. In February 2012, Doherty signed a non-contract deal with Conference National side Bath City.

== International career ==
Despite being born in England, Doherty qualified to play for Northern Ireland through his grandfather who was from Derry. Having played for the Northern Ireland B team against Scotland Future in May 2003, he made his full international debut against Italy the following month. He made eight further appearances for his country, the last of which was against England in March 2005.

== Honours ==
Bristol City

- Football League Trophy: 2002–03

Individual

- PFA Team of the Year: 2006–07 Football League Two, 2008–09 Football League Two
