= Steve Phillips (footballer, born 1978) =

English footballer and coach

Personal information
- Full name: Steven John Phillips
- Date of birth: 6 May 1978 (age 48)
- Place of birth: Bath, England
- Position: Goalkeeper

Team information
- Current team: Taunton Town (goalkeeping coach)

Youth career
- 1996–1997: Paulton Rovers

Senior career*
Years	Team	Apps	(Gls)
1997–2006	Bristol City	257	(0)
1996	→ Gloucester City (loan)		
1996	→ Evesham United (loan)		
1997	→ Worcester City (loan)		
2006–2010	Bristol Rovers	136	(0)
2009	→ Shrewsbury Town (loan)	11	(0)
2009–2010	→ Crewe Alexandra (loan)	28	(0)
2010–2014	Crewe Alexandra	78	(0)
2014	Nantwich Town		
2014–2015	Shepton Mallet		
2015–2017	Bath City	47	(0)
2016–2017	→ Mangotsfield United (loan)	23	(0)
2017	Mangotsfield United	4	(0)
2018	Yeovil Town	0	(0)
2023–2024	Taunton Town	0	(0)
- * Club domestic league appearances and goals as of 20:38, 15 April 2024 (UTC)

Steven John Phillips (born 6 May 1978 in Bath, Somerset) is an English football goalkeeper, who was most recently employed as the goalkeeping coach at Taunton Town.

== Career ==
Phillips began his career playing for Coleford Athletic under 13s, before moving into non-League football with Paulton Rovers. After impressing at Paulton, he moved to Bristol City in 1997, where he went on to make 250 league appearances.

He was replaced in the first team by Adriano Basso early in the 2005–06 season and, despite being in his testimonial season, Phillips never played again for the club.

In the summer of 2006, Phillips moved across the city to rivals Bristol Rovers, where he established himself in the first-team and helped Rovers secure a play-off spot in the 2006/07 season; his performances during the season earned him the club's Player of the Year award. Phillips also won League Two's player of the month award for November 2006, having not conceded any league goals during that month, and the Football League's Golden Glove competition after keeping the most clean sheets for the 2006–07 season.

Following this successful season, Phillips attracted interest from Turkish team Ankara Demirspor; there was also interest from Ankaragücü, but no move came about.

On 26 August 2009, Phillips signed for Shrewsbury Town on a one-month loan deal, which was soon extended. In November 2009, he joined Shrewsbury's league rivals Crewe on a two-month loan with a view to a permanent transfer; he made his Crewe debut against Morecambe in a 2–1 home defeat. On 6 January 2010, Phillips extended his loan with Crewe until the end of the season. He established himself as the club's first-choice goalkeeper, but missed the last three games of the season through a shoulder injury.

Along with 14 other players, he was released by Bristol Rovers at the end of the 2009–10 season, and, after his successful loan period, joined Crewe on a permanent contract. Having established himself in the team, he was part of the 2011–12 squad who achieved promotion to League One, and was offered a role as player-coach in 2012.

After losing his first team place to Ben Garratt, Phillips left the club at the end of the 2013–14 season to take up a coaching role with Shepton Mallet, while continuing his playing career with his local club Nantwich Town.

In June 2015, he joined Bath City, and in 2016 he moved on to Mangotsfield United.

== Coaching career ==
In April 2016, Phillips returned to former club Bristol Rovers as academy goalkeeping coach. In September 2017, he joined League Two side Yeovil Town as interim goalkeeping coach following the departure of Sam Shulberg.

In September 2023, Phillips joined National League South club Taunton Town as goalkeeping coach; he also registered as a player, and was an unused substitute on five occasions.

== Personal life ==
Phillips' son Frankie also became a goalkeeper, playing for the academies of both Liverpool and Southampton. He currently plays for Exeter City

== Honours ==
Bristol City

- Football League Trophy: 2002–03; runner-up: 1999–2000

Bristol Rovers

- Football League Two play-offs: 2007
- Football League Trophy runner-up: 2006–07

Crewe Alexandra

- Football League Two play-offs: 2012
- Football League Trophy: 2012–13

Individual

- PFA Team of the Year: 2003–04 Second Division
