= Brian Tinnion =

English footballer and manager (born 1968)

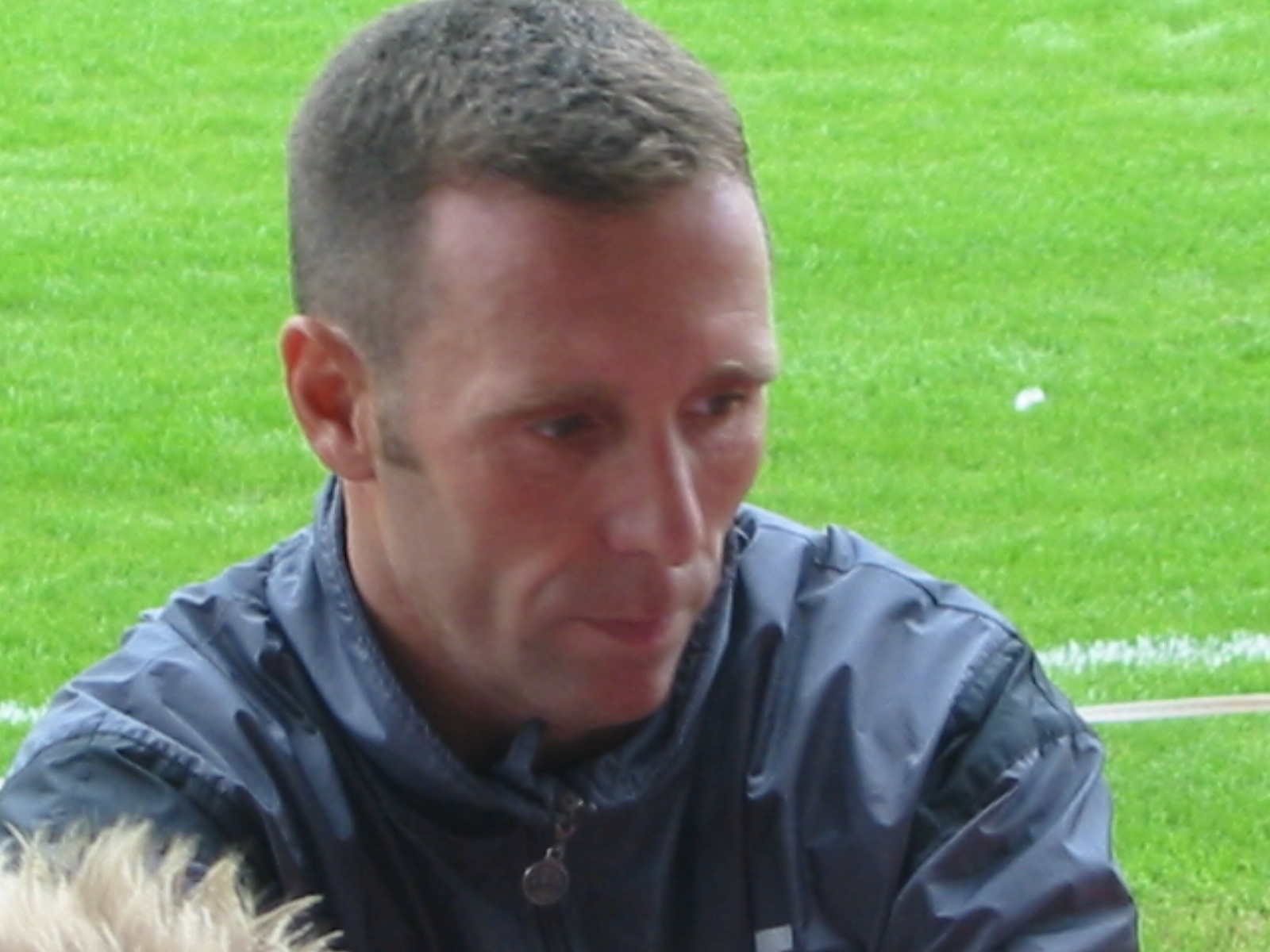
- Tinnion in 2004

Personal information
- Date of birth: 23 February 1968 (age 58)
- Place of birth: Stanley, England
- Height: 6 ft 0 in (1.83 m)
- Position: Midfielder

Senior career*
Years	Team	Apps	(Gls)
1986–1989	Newcastle United	32	(2)
1989–1993	Bradford City	145	(22)
1993–2005	Bristol City	458	(36)
2005–2006	Aldershot Town	7	(1)
2006–2007	Weston-super-Mare		
2007	Team Bath		

Managerial career
- 2004–2005: Bristol City
- * Club domestic league appearances and goals

Brian Tinnion (born 23 February 1968) is an English former football player and manager. He made over 450 appearances for Bristol City, including a spell as player-manager, and is currently the club's Academy Director. He started as a left-back but later became a goal-scoring left-sided midfielder.

== Career ==
Tinnion was born in Stanley, County Durham and was recruited by Newcastle United as an apprentice after scouts had spotted his useful left foot, he went on to be a member of the Newcastle United FA Youth Cup winning side of 1985 that included the likes of Paul Gascoigne. Tinnion signed as a professional before a first-team home game on the pitch of St James' Park a few days after his eighteenth birthday in 1986. In the 1987–88 season, he started 30 league games for the Magpies in the left-back slot. He earned a call-up to the England Under-21 squad in May 1988 for a tour of Toulon but had to pull out injured. He was sold to Bradford City for £150,000 in 1989. He scored the last-gasp penalty that pinched a point at Elland Road on Grand National Day 1990 in a heated local derby against Leeds United.

It was while at Bradford that Tinnion expressed himself when pushed forward onto the left side of a three-man midfield in the early 1990s, the Bantam soon had the reputation of having the most creative left foot of the lower leagues. Tinnion found himself top-goalscorer in all competitions across all four divisions by Christmas 1991 with 13 goals (most of which spectacular), but he picked up a career-threatening injury at Hartlepool United on Boxing Day 1991; in front of a host of top-flight scouts so it was thought. His injury was overcome in time to start the 1992–93 season in the Bantams starting line-up, but before the season was out, in March 1993, he failed to agree a new contract and moved on to Bristol City for a tribunal-set fee of around £180,000. His first goal for his new club came against bitter rivals Bristol Rovers with a last-gasp penalty. Then in January 1994 he scored the winning goal in City's giant-killing FA Cup win over Liverpool at Anfield.

He went on to become one of City's dominant players of the 1990s. He switched from wide on the left flank into the centre of a three-man midfield under new manager Danny Wilson in 2000 and the role often gave him time and space to execute through balls, such was his form in that role that he was voted as the best player in his division. He became player-coach in 2000 (and had helped coach the club's youth teams since the mid-90s) and succeeded Danny Wilson as manager in 2004. He was also part of the side that won the 2003 Football League Trophy final.

Tinnion's first season in charge saw Bristol City fail to make the play-offs and the 2005–06 season started inconsistently, leaving the City fans unconvinced about his ability to make his move into management successful. City's league results failed to improve in 2005/6, and capitulating in a 7–1 thrashing by Swansea City on 10 September 2005 was the final straw; facing a wave of discontent among the supporters, Tinnion stepped down as manager the following day.

After his departure from Bristol City, Tinnion trained with Cheltenham Town, turning out for them in a reserve match, and then joined Conference side Aldershot.

He subsequently played for Conference South side Weston-super-Mare and in January 2007 joined TeamBath.

Tinnion has since retired from playing in the summer of 2007 and now coaches youth football, running soccer schools both in Southern Spain and at The Imperial Ground in Bristol. In addition to this, he now works in the Bristol City youth setup, managing the loan moves of young players. In October 2021, Tinnion was promoted to the role of Academy Director.

In November 2022, Tinnion was appointed as Technical Director. On 11 June 2026, he announced he was leaving the club.

== Honours ==
Bristol City

- Football League Trophy: 2002–03; runner-up: 1999–2000

Individual

- PFA Fans' Player of the Year: 2000–01 Second Division
- PFA Team of the Year: 2000–01 Second Division, 2003–04 Second Division
