= 1991–92 Bristol City F.C. season =

Bristol City
1991–92 season
- Chairman: Leslie Kew
- Manager: Jimmy Lumsden (until 24 February); Mark Aizlewood/Russell Osman/Gary Shelton (24 February – 9 March); Denis Smith (from 9 March)
- Stadium: Ashton Gate
- Second Division: 17th
- FA Cup: Fifth round
- League Cup: Second round
- Full Members Cup: Second round
- Average home league attendance: 11,479

During the 1991–92 English football season, Bristol City F.C. competed in the Football League Second Division.

== Season summary ==
In the 1991–92 season, Bristol City made a bright start to the campaign and by 9 November after 17 games, the Robins sat 1 point of the play-off places and looked as though they would challenge for a play-off spot but afterwards, a poor run of form which saw Bristol City win only 1 from their next 18 league matches and as a result slipped to the relegation zone with only Port Vale below them and it seemed the Robins were favourites to go down following a huge collapse of form but an 8-game unbeaten run which include 5 wins, kept them up and the Robins finished in 17th place.

== Final league table ==
| Pos | Team | Pld | W | D | L | GF | GA | GD | Pts | Qualification or relegation |
|---|---|---|---|---|---|---|---|---|---|---|
| 15 | Millwall | 46 | 17 | 10 | 19 | 64 | 71 | −7 | 61 | Qualification for the First Division (Note: From the 1992–93 season, the first tier became the Premier League, the second tier - then known as the Second Division - was renamed to the First Division, and the third tier - then known as the Third Division - was renamed to the Second Division.) |
| 16 | Barnsley | 46 | 16 | 11 | 19 | 46 | 57 | −11 | 59 | Qualification for the First Division |
| 17 | Bristol City | 46 | 13 | 15 | 18 | 55 | 71 | −16 | 54 | Qualification for the First Division |
| 18 | Sunderland | 46 | 14 | 11 | 21 | 61 | 65 | −4 | 53 | Qualification for the First Division |
| 19 | Grimsby Town | 46 | 14 | 11 | 21 | 47 | 62 | −15 | 53 | Qualification for the First Division |

Rules for classification: 1) Points; 2) Goal difference; 3) Goals scored

== Results ==
Bristol City's score comes first

=== Legend ===
| Win | Draw | Loss |

=== Football League Second Division ===
| Date | Opponent | Venue | Result | Attendance | Scorers |
|---|---|---|---|---|---|
| 17 August 1991 | Southend United | A | 1–1 | 6,720 | Taylor |
| 20 August 1991 | Brighton & Hove Albion | H | 2–1 | 11,299 | Scott, Bryant |
| 24 August 1991 | Blackburn Rovers | H | 1–0 | 11,317 | Allison |
| 31 August 1991 | Port Vale | A | 1–1 | 7,057 | Morgan |
| 4 September 1991 | Bristol Rovers | H | 1–0 | 20,183 | Allison |
| 7 September 1991 | Leicester City | A | 1–2 | 17,815 | Morgan |
| 14 September 1991 | Tranmere Rovers | H | 2–2 | 11,235 | Allison, Shelton |
| 17 September 1991 | Millwall | H | 2–2 | 10,862 | Bryant, Scott (pen) |
| 21 September 1991 | Ipswich Town | A | 2–4 | 9,692 | Allison, Smith |
| 28 September 1991 | Portsmouth | H | 0–2 | 9,830 | |
| 5 October 1991 | Derby County | A | 1–4 | 11,880 | Edwards |
| 12 October 1991 | Watford | H | 1–0 | 7,882 | Connor |
| 19 October 1991 | Barnsley | A | 2–1 | 6,566 | May, Shelton |
| 26 October 1991 | Newcastle United | H | 1–1 | 8,613 | Taylor |
| 2 November 1991 | Cambridge United | A | 0–0 | 4,810 | |
| 5 November 1991 | Plymouth Argyle | H | 2–0 | 7,735 | Morgan, Allison |
| 9 November 1991 | Sunderland | H | 1–0 | 10,570 | Allison |
| 16 November 1991 | Oxford United | A | 1–1 | 5,780 | Allison |
| 23 November 1991 | Middlesbrough | A | 1–3 | 12,928 | Taylor |
| 30 November 1991 | Charlton Athletic | H | 0–2 | 9,123 | |
| 7 December 1991 | Grimsby Town | A | 1–3 | 4,866 | Rennie |
| 21 December 1991 | Bristol Rovers | A | 2–3 | 6,306 | Rennie, Bent |
| 26 December 1991 | Swindon Town | H | 1–1 | 14,636 | Taylor |
| 28 December 1991 | Port Vale | H | 3–0 | 9,235 | Allison, Osman, Bent |
| 1 January 1992 | Brighton & Hove Albion | A | 0–0 | 7,555 | |
| 11 January 1992 | Blackburn Rovers | A | 0–4 | 12,964 | |
| 18 January 1992 | Southend United | H | 2–2 | 9,883 | Dziekanowski, own goal |
| 1 February 1992 | Barnsley | H | 0–2 | 9,508 | |
| 4 February 1992 | Swindon Town | A | 0–2 | 9,627 | |
| 8 February 1992 | Newcastle United | A | 0–3 | 29,263 | |
| 22 February 1992 | Charlton Athletic | A | 1–2 | 5,900 | Shelton |
| 29 February 1992 | Grimsby Town | H | 1–1 | 8,992 | Aizlewood |
| 7 March 1992 | Wolverhampton Wanderers | A | 1–1 | 12,542 | Osman |
| 10 March 1992 | Plymouth Argyle | A | 0–1 | 9,734 | |
| 14 March 1992 | Cambridge United | H | 1–2 | 9,579 | Scott |
| 17 March 1992 | Wolverhampton Wanderers | H | 2–0 | 11,623 | Dziekanowski (2) |
| 21 March 1992 | Sunderland | A | 3–1 | 18,933 | Cole, Allison (2) |
| 28 March 1992 | Oxford United | H | 1–1 | 12,402 | Dziekanowski |
| 31 March 1992 | Tranmere Rovers | A | 2–2 | 5,797 | Cole, Rosenior |
| 4 April 1992 | Leicester City | H | 2–1 | 13,020 | Rosenior, Cole |
| 7 April 1992 | Middlesbrough | H | 1–1 | 12,814 | Cole |
| 11 April 1992 | Millwall | A | 3–2 | 6,989 | Rosenior (2), Cole |
| 18 April 1992 | Ipswich Town | H | 2–1 | 16,941 | Rosenior, Cole |
| 20 April 1992 | Portsmouth | A | 0–1 | 17,168 | |
| 25 April 1992 | Derby County | H | 1–2 | 16,648 | Atteveld |
| 2 May 1992 | Watford | A | 2–5 | 10,582 | Cole (2) |

=== FA Cup ===
| Round | Date | Opponent | Venue | Result | Attendance | Goalscorers |
|---|---|---|---|---|---|---|
| R3 | 4 January 1992 | Wimbledon | H | 1–1 | 12,679 | Barton (own goal) |
| R3R | 14 January 1992 | Wimbledon | A | 1–0 | 3,747 | May |
| R4 | 25 January 1992 | Leicester City | A | 2–1 | 19,313 | Bent, Dziekanowski |
| R5 | 15 February 1992 | Nottingham Forest | A | 1–4 | 24,615 | Dziekanowski |

=== League Cup ===
| Round | Date | Opponent | Venue | Result | Attendance | Goalscorers |
|---|---|---|---|---|---|---|
| R1 1st Leg | 25 September 1991 | Bristol Rovers | A | 3–1 | 5,155 | Morgan, Smith, Allison |
| R1 2nd Leg | 8 October 1991 | Bristol Rovers | H | 2–4 (lost on away goals) | 9,880 | Morgan, Smith |

=== Full Members Cup ===
| Round | Date | Opponent | Venue | Result | Attendance | Goalscorers |
|---|---|---|---|---|---|---|
| SR2 | 22 October 1991 | Southampton | H | 1–2 | 5,672 | Taylor 9' |

== Squad ==
Note: Flags indicate national team as defined under FIFA eligibility rules; some limited exceptions apply. Players may hold more than one non-FIFA nationality.

| Pos. | Nation | Player |
|---|---|---|
| GK | ENG | Andy Leaning |
| GK | SCO | Ronnie Sinclair |
| GK | ENG | Keith Welch |
| DF | WAL | Mark Aizlewood |
| DF | ENG | Matt Bryant |
| DF | ENG | Gus Caesar |
| DF | WAL | Rob Edwards |
| DF | ENG | Andy Llewellyn |
| DF | ENG | Russell Osman |
| DF | SCO | David Rennie |
| DF | ENG | Martin Scott |
| MF | NED | Raymond Atteveld |
| MF | ENG | Junior Bent |
| MF | ENG | Louie Donowa |

| Pos. | Nation | Player |
|---|---|---|
| MF | SCO | Mark Gavin |
| MF | ENG | Gerry Harrison |
| MF | ENG | Andy May |
| MF | SCO | Jim McIntyre |
| MF | SCO | Micky Mellon |
| MF | ENG | Gary Shelton (captain) |
| MF | ENG | Dave Smith |
| FW | ENG | Wayne Allison |
| FW | ENG | Andy Cole |
| FW | ENG | Terry Connor |
| FW | POL | Dariusz Dziekanowski |
| FW | ENG | Nicky Morgan |
| FW | SLE | Leroy Rosenior |
| FW | ENG | Bob Taylor |
