= 1990–91 Bristol City F.C. season =

Bristol City
1990–91 season
- Chairman: Les Kew
- Manager: Joe Jordan (Until September 1990); Jimmy Lumsden (From September 1990)
- Stadium: Ashton Gate
- Second Division: 9th
- FA Cup: Third round
- League Cup: Second round
- Full Members Cup: First round
- Top goalscorer: League: Nicky Morgan (13); All: Nicky Morgan (17)

The 1990–91 season was Bristol City Football Club's 93rd season in English football, and their first season back in the Second Division in a decade. Joe Jordan left in September 1990 to join Hearts as Manager. His assistant Jimmy Lumsden took over the reins upon his departure. City had a fairly decent season on their first season back in the 2nd tier. They pushed for the play-offs and ended up in 9th position.

The club's leading goalscorer was Nicky Morgan, with 17 goals in all competitions.

== Final league table ==
| Pos | Team | Pld | W | D | L | GF | GA | GD | Pts | Qualification or relegation |
|---|---|---|---|---|---|---|---|---|---|---|
| 7 | Middlesbrough | 46 | 20 | 9 | 17 | 66 | 47 | +19 | 69 | Qualification for the Second Division play-offs |
| 8 | Barnsley | 46 | 19 | 12 | 15 | 63 | 48 | +15 | 69 | |
| 9 | Bristol City | 46 | 20 | 7 | 19 | 68 | 71 | −3 | 67 | |
| 10 | Oxford United | 46 | 14 | 19 | 13 | 69 | 66 | +3 | 61 | |
| 11 | Newcastle United | 46 | 14 | 17 | 15 | 49 | 56 | −7 | 59 | |

Rules for classification: 1) Points; 2) Goal difference; 3) Goals scored

=== Legend ===
| Win | Draw | Loss |

=== Football League Second Division ===
| Date | Opponent | Venue | Result | Attendance | Scorers |
|---|---|---|---|---|---|
| 25 August 1990 | Blackburn Rovers | H | 4–2 | 13,755 | Taylor (2), Aizlewood, Morgan |
| 2 September 1990 | Swindon Town | A | 1–0 | 12,249 | Bent |
| 8 September 1990 | Plymouth Argyle | H | 1–1 | 14,283 | Morgan |
| 15 September 1990 | West Bromwich Albion | A | 1–2 | 12,081 | Newman |
| 22 September 1990 | Brighton & Hove Albion | H | 3–1 | 11,522 | Taylor (2), Smith |
| 29 September 1990 | Newcastle United | H | 1–0 | 15,858 | Smith |
| 3 October 1990 | Leicester City | A | 0–3 | 9,815 | |
| 6 October 1990 | Wolverhampton Wanderers | A | 0–4 | 17,891 | |
| 13 October 1990 | West Ham United | H | 1–1 | 16,838 | Morgan |
| 20 October 1990 | Oldham Athletic | H | 1–2 | 14,031 | Morgan |
| 24 October 1990 | Millwall | A | 2–1 | 10,335 | Allison, Aizlewood |
| 27 October 1990 | Port Vale | A | 2–3 | 7,451 | Smith (pen), Allison |
| 3 November 1990 | Watford | H | 3–2 | 11,576 | Allison (2), Own goal |
| 10 November 1990 | Oxford United | A | 1–3 | 6,834 | Shelton |
| 17 November 1990 | Hull City | H | 4–1 | 9,346 | Shelton, May, Newman, Morgan |
| 24 November 1990 | Ipswich Town | A | 1–1 | 10,037 | Taylor |
| 1 December 1990 | Charlton Athletic | H | 0–1 | 10,984 | |
| 8 December 1990 | Sheffield Wednesday | H | 1–1 | 11,254 | Own goal |
| 15 December 1990 | Blackburn Rovers | A | 1–0 | 7,072 | Newman |
| 22 December 1990 | Notts County | A | 2–3 | 6,586 | Bent, Smith |
| 26 December 1990 | Portsmouth | H | 4–1 | 11,892 | Morgan (2), Shelton, Rennie |
| 29 December 1990 | Middlesbrough | H | 3–0 | 14,023 | May, Morgan, Allison |
| 1 January 1991 | Barnsley | A | 0–2 | 8,961 | |
| 12 January 1991 | Swindon Town | H | 0–4 | 16,169 | |
| 19 January 1991 | Plymouth Argyle | A | 0–1 | 8,074 | |
| 26 January 1991 | Bristol Rovers | A | 2–3 | 7,054 | Smith (pen), Newman |
| 2 February 1991 | West Bromwich Albion | H | 2–0 | 11,492 | Morgan, Taylor |
| 16 February 1991 | Hull City | A | 2–1 | 5,212 | May, Newman |
| 23 February 1991 | Oxford United | H | 3–1 | 10,938 | Shelton (2), Taylor |
| 2 March 1991 | Charlton Athletic | A | 1–2 | 5,477 | Smith |
| 5 March 1991 | Bristol Rovers | H | 1–0 | 22,227 | Donowa |
| 9 March 1991 | Ipswich Town | H | 4–2 | 11,470 | Taylor (2), Shelton, Morgan |
| 12 March 1991 | Leicester City | H | 1–0 | 13,297 | Taylor |
| 16 March 1991 | Newcastle United | A | 0–0 | 13,578 | |
| 20 March 1991 | West Ham United | A | 0–1 | 22,951 | |
| 23 March 1991 | Wolverhampton Wanderers | H | 1–1 | 15,499 | Bryant |
| 30 March 1991 | Portsmouth | A | 1–4 | 10,417 | Morgan |
| 1 April 1991 | Notts County | H | 3–2 | 13,466 | Allison, Donowa, Shelton |
| 6 April 1991 | Middlesbrough | A | 1–2 | 13,846 | Taylor |
| 13 April 1991 | Barnsley | H | 1–0 | 12,081 | Newman |
| 21 April 1991 | Oldham Athletic | A | 1–2 | 14,086 | Newman |
| 23 April 1991 | Brighton & Hove Albion | A | 1–0 | 7,738 | Shelton |
| 27 April 1991 | Millwall | H | 1–4 | 16,741 | Morgan |
| 4 May 1991 | Port Vale | H | 1–1 | 13,706 | Allison |
| 11 May 1991 | Watford | A | 3–2 | 13,029 | Morgan, Newman, Donowa |

=== FA Cup ===
| Round | Date | Opponent | Venue | Result | Attendance | Goalscorers |
|---|---|---|---|---|---|---|
| R3 | 5 January 1991 | Norwich City | A | 1–2 | 12,630 | Allison |

=== League Cup ===
| Round | Date | Opponent | Venue | Result | Attendance | Goalscorers |
|---|---|---|---|---|---|---|
| R1 1st Leg | 29 August 1990 | West Bromwich Albion | A | 2–2 | 8,721 | Morgan (2) |
| R1 2nd Leg | 5 September 1990 | West Bromwich Albion | H | 1–0 | 9,851 | Smith |
| R2 1st Leg | 25 September 1990 | Sunderland | A | 1–0 | 10,358 | Morgan |
| R2 2nd Leg | 9 October 1990 | Sunderland | H | 1–6 | 11,776 | Morgan |

=== Full Members Cup ===
| Round | Date | Opponent | Venue | Result | Attendance | Goalscorers |
|---|---|---|---|---|---|---|
| SR2 | 21 November 1990 | Oxford United | A | 2–2 (Lost 4–3 on Penalties) | 1,323 | Newman, May (pen) |

== Squad ==
Note: Flags indicate national team as defined under FIFA eligibility rules; some limited exceptions apply. Players may hold more than one non-FIFA nationality.

| Pos. | Nation | Player |
|---|---|---|
| GK | ENG | Andy Leaning |
| GK | SCO | Ronnie Sinclair |
| DF | WAL | Mark Aizlewood |
| DF | ENG | Matt Bryant |
| DF | ENG | Andy Llewellyn |
| DF | WAL | Paul Mardon |
| DF | ENG | Glenn Humphries |
| DF | ENG | Martin Scott |
| DF | ENG | John Bailey |
| DF | ENG | Chris Honor |
| MF | ENG | Junior Bent |

| Pos. | Nation | Player |
|---|---|---|
| MF | ENG | Louie Donowa |
| DF | SCO | David Rennie |
| MF | ENG | Andy May |
| MF | ENG | Rob Newman (captain) |
| MF | SCO | Micky Mellon |
| MF | ENG | Gary Shelton |
| MF | ENG | Dave Smith |
| FW | ENG | Wayne Allison |
| FW | ENG | Bob Taylor |
| FW | ENG | Nicky Morgan |
