= 1989–90 Bristol City F.C. season =

Bristol City
1989–90 season
- Chairman: Les Kew
- Manager: Joe Jordan
- Stadium: Ashton Gate
- Third Division: 2nd
- FA Cup: Fifth round
- League Cup: First round
- Football League Trophy: Southern Area 1st Round
- Top goalscorer: League: Bob Taylor (27); All: Bob Taylor (34)

The 1989–90 season was Bristol City Football Club's 92nd season in English football, and their sixth consecutive season in the Third Division. It was Joe Jordan's second full season in charge of the club since his appointment as manager in March 1988. The club had a successful season, and ended up 2nd to gain automatic promotion to the Second Division. City had led the Third Division for some time, but talisman and top goalscorer Bob Taylor was injured for the final seven matches of the season which left the door open for fierce local rivals Bristol Rovers to beat them into 1st position.

There was success in the FA Cup too, where First Division side Chelsea were beaten 3–1 at Ashton Gate in January, and local rivals Swindon Town, who were then in a higher division were also beat 2–1 at Ashton Gate.

The club's leading goalscorer was Bob Taylor, with 34 goals in all competitions.

== Final league table ==
Pos	Team	Pld	W	D	L	GF	GA	GD	Pts	Promotion or relegation
1	Bristol Rovers (C, P)	46	26	15	5	71	35	+36	93	Promotion to the Second Division
2	Bristol City (P)	46	27	10	9	76	40	+36	91	Promotion to the Second Division
3	Notts County (O, P)	46	25	12	9	73	53	+20	87	Qualification for the Third Division play-offs
4	Tranmere Rovers	46	23	11	12	86	49	+37	80	Qualification for the Third Division play-offs
5	Bury	46	21	11	14	70	49	+21	74	Qualification for the Third Division play-offs

(C) Champions; (O) Play-off winners; (P) Promoted

== Results ==
Bristol City's score comes first

=== Legend ===
Win	Draw	Loss

=== Football League Second Division ===
Date	Opponent	Venue	Result	Attendance	Scorers
19 August 1989	Bury	A	1–1	3,399	Taylor
26 August 1989	Birmingham City	H	1–0	8,938	Taylor
2 September 1989	Northampton Town	A	0–2	4,088	
9 September 1989	Blackpool	H	2–0	7,172	Wimbleton (pen), Newman
16 September 1989	Cardiff City	A	3–0	5,970	Shelton, Taylor, Turner
23 September 1989	Bristol Rovers	H	0–0	17,432	
26 September 1989	Shrewsbury Town	H	2–1	9,188	Taylor (2)
29 September 1989	Tranmere Rovers	A	0–6	8,974	
7 October 1989	Brentford	A	2–0	7,421	Wimbleton (pen), Turner
14 October 1989	Swansea City	H	1–3	8,794	Taylor
17 October 1989	Notts County	H	2–0	8,331	Eaton, Own goal
21 October 1989	Mansfield Town	A	0–1	2,941	
28 October 1989	Wigan Athletic	H	3–0	6,365	Shelton, Rennie, Turner
31 October 1989	Crewe Alexandra	A	1–0	3,650	Bailey
4 November 1989	Walsall	A	2–0	5,286	Taylor, Turner
11 November 1989	Bolton Wanderers	H	1–1	11,994	Newman
25 November 1989	Reading	A	1–1	5,353	Rennie
2 December 1989	Rotherham United	H	0–0	9,509	
16 December 1989	Leyton Orient	H	2–1	7,486	Taylor (2)
26 December 1989	Fulham	A	1–0	6,089	Taylor
30 December 1989	Huddersfield Town	A	1–2	7,681	Jones
1 January 1990	Preston North End	H	2–1	11,803	Own goal, Newman
13 January 1990	Birmingham City	A	4–0	11,277	Taylor (2), Turner, Newman
20 January 1990	Bury	H	1–0	10,997	Smith
30 January 1990	Chester City	H	1–0	8,769	Newman
10 February 1990	Cardiff City	H	1–0	11,982	Shelton
24 February 1990	Reading	H	0–1	10,616	
3 March 1990	Chester City	A	3–0	2,496	Taylor (3)
6 March 1990	Tranmere Rovers	H	1–3	14,376	Shelton
10 March 1990	Shrewsbury Town	A	1–0	4,785	Smith
13 March 1990	Blackpool	A	3–1	3,227	Taylor (2), Shelton
17 March 1990	Brentford	H	2–0	10,813	Gavin, Rennie
20 March 1990	Swansea City	A	5–0	6,867	Taylor (3), Newman, Honor
24 March 1990	Notts County	A	0–0	9,598	
27 March 1990	Northampton Town	H	3–1	11,965	Turner, Shelton, Taylor
31 March 1990	Mansfield Town	H	1–1	11,773	Taylor
3 April 1990	Rotherham United	A	2–1	5,274	Own goal, Taylor
7 April 1990	Wigan Athletic	A	3–2	3,261	Smith (pen), Taylor, Ferguson
10 April 1990	Crewe Alexandra	H	4–1	13,800	Taylor (3), Gavin (pen)
14 April 1990	Preston North End	A	2–2	7,599	Morgan, Shelton
16 April 1990	Fulham	H	5–1	16,139	Morgan, Smith, Newman, Ferguson, Shelton
21 April 1990	Leyton Orient	A	1–1	7,273	Newman
24 April 1990	Huddersfield Town	H	1–1	17,791	Morgan
28 April 1990	Bolton Wanderers	A	0–1	11,098	
2 May 1990	Bristol Rovers	A	0–3	9,831	
5 May 1990	Walsall	H	4–0	19,480	Shelton, Gavin (pen), Rennie, Morgan

=== FA Cup ===
Round	Date	Opponent	Venue	Result	Attendance	Goalscorers
R1	18 November 1989	Barnet	H	2–0	7,528	Taylor, Turner
R2	9 December 1989	Fulham	H	2–1	7,662	Taylor, Wimbleton (pen)
R3	6 January 1990	Swindon Town	H	2–1	17,422	Taylor, Newman
R4	27 January 1990	Chelsea	H	3–1	24,535	Turner (2), Gavin
R5	19 February 1990	Cambridge United	H	0–0	20,676	
R5 Replay	21 February 1990	Cambridge United	A	1–1	9,796	Taylor
R5 2nd Replay	27 February 1990	Cambridge United	A	1–5	9,047	Taylor

=== League Cup ===
Round	Date	Opponent	Venue	Result	Attendance	Goalscorers
R1 1st Leg	22 August 1989	Reading	H	2–3	6,318	Wimbleton (pen), Smith
R1 2nd Leg	29 August 1989	Reading	A	2–2	4,457	Taylor (2)

=== Football League Trophy ===
Round	Date	Opponent	Venue	Result	Attendance	Goalscorers
Southern Section Preliminary Round	5 December 1989	Swansea City	H	2–1	3,488	Jones, Shelton
Southern Section Preliminary Round	15 January 1990	Reading	A	1–1	1,784	Gavin
Southern Section 1st Round	23 January 1990	Notts County	H	0–1	4,902	

== Squad ==
Note: Flags indicate national team as defined under FIFA eligibility rules; some limited exceptions apply. Players may hold more than one non-FIFA nationality.

Pos.	Nation	Player
GK	SCO	Ronnie Sinclair
GK	ENG	Andy Leaning
DF	WAL	Paul Mardon
DF	IRL	John Pender
DF	SCO	David Rennie
DF	ENG	Glenn Humphries
DF	ENG	Andy Llewellyn
DF	ENG	John Bailey
DF	ENG	Paul France
DF	SCO	Ronnie McQuilter
DF	ENG	Matt Bryant
DF	ENG	Chris Honor
DF	ENG	Russell Bromage
MF	ENG	Gary Shelton
MF	ENG	Rob Newman

Pos.	Nation	Player
MF	SCO	Micky Mellon
MF	ENG	Paul Wimbleton
MF	SCO	Mark Gavin
MF	ENG	Dave Smith
MF	ENG	Junior Bent
FW	ENG	Bob Taylor
FW	ENG	Robbie Turner
FW	ENG	Nicky Morgan
FW	ENG	Dean Horrix
FW	WAL	Cameron Toshack
FW	ENG	Jason Eaton
FW	SCO	Iain Ferguson (on loan from Hearts)
FW	WAL	Andy Jones (on loan from Charlton Athletic)
