= 1992–93 Bristol City F.C. season =

Bristol City
1992–93 season
- Chairman: Les Kew
- Manager: Denis Smith (Until 21 January 1993); Russell Osman (From 21 January 1993)
- Stadium: Ashton Gate
- First Division: 15th
- FA Cup: Third round
- League Cup: Second round
- Top goalscorer: League: Andy Cole (12); All: Andy Cole (17)

During the 1992–93 season, Bristol City competed in the Football League First Division, in which they finished 15th. They also competed in the FA Cup, where the club was eliminated in the third round, and Football League Cup where they were knocked out in the second round.

Andy Cole was City's leading goalscorer with a total of 17 goals. He was sold to Newcastle United in March 1993 for £1,750,000, a record fee for both clubs. Brian Tinnion signed from Bradford City in March 1993 for £180,000, and went on to become a key player for the club over the next decade.

== First Division ==
=== League table ===
Pos	Team	Pld	W	D	L	GF	GA	GD	Pts
13	Barnsley	46	17	9	20	56	60	−4	60
14	Oxford United	46	14	14	18	53	56	−3	56
15	Bristol City	46	14	14	18	49	67	−18	56
16	Watford	46	14	13	19	57	71	−14	55
17	Notts County	46	12	16	18	55	70	−15	52

Source: rsssf.com
Rules for classification: 1) Points; 2) Goals scored; 3) Goal difference

== Results ==
Bristol City's score comes first

=== Legend ===
Win	Draw	Loss

=== Football League First Division ===
Date	Opponent	Venue	Result	Attendance	Scorers
15 August 1992	Portsmouth	H	3–3	15,251	Dziekanowski (2), Cole
22 August 1992	Luton Town	A	3–0	7,926	Mellon, Cole, Own goal
29 August 1992	Sunderland	H	0–0	14,076	
6 September 1992	Derby County	A	4-3	12,738	Scott (pen), Bent, Allison, Own goal
12 September 1992	Southend United	H	0-1	9,515	
15 September 1992	West Ham United	H	1-5	14,130	Scott
19 September 1992	Newcastle United	A	0-5	29,465	
26 September 1992	Barnsley	H	2-1	8,041	Allison, Scott (pen)
3 October 1992	Tranmere Rovers	A	0-3	5,975	
10 October 1992	Charlton Athletic	H	2-1	9,286	Dziekanowski, Harrison
17 October 1992	Cambridge United	A	1-2	3,894	Cole
24 October 1992	Leicester City	H	2-1	10,436	Cole, Own goal
31 October 1992	Brentford	A	1-5	8,726	Cole
4 November 1992	Millwall	A	1-4	5,934	Cole
7 November 1992	Birmingham City	H	3-0	10,008	Rosenior, Shelton, Cole
14 November 1992	Grimsby Town	A	1-2	5,651	Cole
21 November 1992	Swindon Town	H	2-2	14,066	Shelton, Rosenior
28 November 1992	Notts County	H	1-0	9,086	Shelton
5 December 1992	Watford	A	0-0	6,746	
13 December 1992	Bristol Rovers	A	0-4	7,106	
19 December 1992	Peterborough United	H	0-1	7,309	
26 December 1992	Oxford United	H	1-1	10,737	Rosenior
28 December 1992	Wolves	A	0-0	16,419	
9 January 1993	Newcastle United	H	1-2	15,446	Allison
16 January 1993	Barnsley	A	1-2	5,423	Cole
6 February 1993	Portsmouth	A	3-2	10,675	Shelton, Bryant, Gavin
10 February 1993	Southend United	A	1-1	3,086	Cole
20 February 1993	Sunderland	A	0–0	17,122	
27 February 1993	Charlton Athletic	A	1-2	7,351	Cole
6 March 1993	Tranmere Rovers	H	1-3	8,810	Cole
9 March 1993	Millwall	H	0-1	8,771	
13 March 1993	Birmingham City	A	1-0	15,611	Morgan
20 March 1993	Watford	H	2-1	8,265	Bent, Pennyfather
24 March 1993	Swindon Town	A	1-2	13,157	Rosenior
28 March 1993	Grimsby Town	H	1-0	6,755	Morgan
3 April 1993	Notts County	A	0–0	6,634	
6 April 1993	Bristol Rovers	H	2-1	21,854	Morgan, Tinnion (pen)
10 April 1993	Oxford United	A	0-2	6,145	
12 April 1993	Wolves	H	1-0		Bent
17 April 1993	Peterborough United	A	1-1	5,169	Tinnion
20 April 1993	Derby County	H	0–0	8,869	
24 April 1993	Cambridge United	H	0–0	8,995	
1 May 1993	Leicester City	A	0–0	19,294	
8 May 1993	Brentford	H	4-1	12,659	Rosenior (3), Allison

=== FA Cup ===
Round	Date	Opponent	Venue	Result	Attendance	Goalscorers
R3	19 January 1993	Luton Town	A	0-2	6,092	

=== League Cup ===
Round	Date	Opponent	Venue	Result	Attendance	Goalscorers
R1 1st Leg	18 August 1992	Cardiff City	A	0-1	9,126	
R1 2nd Leg	25 August 1993	Cardiff City	H	5-1	9,801	Cole (3), Rosenior, Allison
R2 1st Leg	22 September 1992	Sheffield United	H	2-1	6,922	Connor, Scott (pen)
R2 2nd Leg	7 October 1992	Sheffield United	A	1-4	7,588	Cole

=== Anglo-Italian Cup ===
Round	Date	Opponent	Venue	Result	Attendance	Goalscorers
Preliminary Round	1 September 1992	Watford	H	1-0	3,588	Shelton
Preliminary Round	29 September 1992	Luton Town	A	1-1	2,538	Allison
Group B	11 November 1992	Cosenza	H	0-2	3,644	
Group B	24 November 1992	Pisa	A	3-4	1,500	Edwards, Shelton, Scott (pen)
Group B	8 December 1992	Reggiana	H	1-2	2,281	Allison
Group B	16 December 1992	Cremonese	A	2-2	535	Cole, Rosenior

== Squad ==
Note: Flags indicate national team as defined under FIFA eligibility rules; some limited exceptions apply. Players may hold more than one non-FIFA nationality.

Pos.	Nation	Player
GK	ENG	Keith Welch
GK	ENG	Andy Leaning
DF	ENG	Martin Scott
DF	ENG	Russell Osman
DF	WAL	Mark Aizlewood
DF	WAL	Rob Edwards
DF	ENG	Andy Llewellyn
DF	SCO	Stuart Munro
DF	NED	Raymond Atteveld
DF	SWE	Mark Shail
DF	ENG	Matt Bryant
DF	SCO	Brian Mitchell
MF	ENG	Brian Tinnion
MF	ENG	Gary Shelton
MF	ENG	Glenn Pennyfather

Pos.	Nation	Player
MF	SCO	Micky Mellon
MF	SCO	Mark Gavin
MF	ENG	Gerry Harrison
FW	ENG	Andy Cole
FW	ENG	Leroy Rosenior
FW	POL	Dariusz Dziekanowski
FW	ENG	Nicky Morgan
FW	ENG	Wayne Allison
FW	ENG	Junior Bent
FW	ENG	Terry Connor
DF	DEN	Bjørn Kristensen (on loan from Newcastle United)
