= 1994–95 Bristol City F.C. season =

Bristol City
1994–95 season
- Manager: Russell Osman (until 14 November 1994); Joe Jordan (from 15 November 1994)
- Stadium: Ashton Gate
- First Division: 23rd (relegated)
- FA Cup: Fourth round
- Football League Cup: Second round
- Highest home attendance: 19,816 vs Everton, FA Cup, 29 January 1995
- Lowest home attendance: 2,546 vs Notts County, League Cup, 27 September 1994
- Average home league attendance: 7,989

During the 1994–95 season, Bristol City competed in the Football League First Division, in which they finished 23rd, and were thus relegated to the Second Division. They also competed in the FA Cup and Football League Cup, being eliminated in the fourth round and second round respectively.

== First Division ==
=== League table ===
Pos	Team	Pld	W	D	L	GF	GA	GD	Pts	Qualification or relegation
20	Sunderland	46	12	18	16	41	45	−4	54	
21	Swindon Town (R)	46	12	12	22	54	73	−19	48	Relegation to the Second Division
22	Burnley (R)	46	11	13	22	49	74	−25	46	Relegation to the Second Division
23	Bristol City (R)	46	11	12	23	42	63	−21	45	Relegation to the Second Division
24	Notts County (R)	46	9	13	24	45	66	−21	40	Relegation to the Second Division

Rules for classification: 1) Points; 2) Goals scored; 3) Goal difference
(R) Relegated

=== Matches ===
First Division match details
Date	Opponents	Venue	Result	Score F–A	Scorers	Attendance
13 August 1994	Sunderland	H	D	0–0		11,127
20 August 1994	Bolton Wanderers	A	W	2–0	Baird, Allison	12,127
27 August 1994	Port Vale	H	D	0–0		8,588
30 August 1994	Burnley	A	D	1–1	Allison	11,067
3 September 1994	Charlton Athletic	A	L	2–3	Allison (2)	9,019
10 September 1994	Notts County	H	W	2–1	Bent, Scott (pen.)	6,670
13 September 1994	Derby County	H	L	0–2		8,029
17 September 1994	Southend United	A	L	1–2	Baird	3,663
24 September 1994	Middlesbrough	H	L	0–1		8,642
1 October 1994	Luton Town	A	W	1–0	Baird	6,633
8 October 1994	Millwall	H	W	1–0	Baird	7,499
15 October 1994	Reading	A	L	0–1		9,389
22 October 1994	Grimsby Town	A	L	0–1		4,024
29 October 1994	Portsmouth	H	D	1–1	Scott (pen.)	7,238
1 November 1994	Wolverhampton Wanderers	H	L	1–5	Baird	10,401
5 November 1994	Sheffield United	A	L	0–3		11,568
20 November 1994	Swindon Town	H	W	3–2	Bent, Allison (2)	9,086
26 November 1994	Oldham Athletic	A	L	0–2		7,277
3 December 1994	Grimsby Town	H	L	1–2	Partridge	6,030
7 December 1994	Barnsley	A	L	1–2	Bent	4,305
10 December 1994	Bolton Wanderers	H	L	0–1		6,144
17 December 1994	Sunderland	A	L	0–2		11,661
26 December 1994	West Bromwich Albion	A	L	0–1		21,071
27 December 1994	Stoke City	H	W	3–1	Bryant, Allison (2)	8,500
31 December 1994	Tranmere Rovers	A	L	0–2		7,439
2 January 1995	Watford	H	D	0–0		9,423
14 January 1995	Portsmouth	A	D	0–0		8,803
21 January 1995	Sheffield United	H	W	2–1	Gayle (o.g.), Shail	10,211
4 February 1995	Barnsley	H	W	3–2	Dryden, Bryant, Allison	6,408
11 February 1995	Wolverhampton Wanderers	A	L	0–2		25,451
15 February 1995	Swindon Town	A	W	3–0	Bent, Fleck, Bryant	9,881
18 February 1995	Oldham Athletic	H	D	2–2	Allison (2)	7,851
25 February 1995	Luton Town	H	D	2–2	Owers, Bent	7,939
4 March 1995	Middlesbrough	A	L	0–3		17,371
7 March 1995	Charlton Athletic	H	W	2–1	Kuhl, Tinnion	6,118
11 March 1995	Port Vale	A	L	1–2	Owers	7,646
18 March 1995	Burnley	H	D	1–1	Partridge	6,717
21 March 1995	Notts County	A	D	1–1	Baird	5,692
25 March 1995	Southend United	H	D	0–0		6,159
1 April 1995	Derby County	A	L	1–3	Allison	14,555
8 April 1995	Tranmere Rovers	H	L	0–1		6,723
15 April 1995	Stoke City	A	L	1–2	Shail	10,172
17 April 1995	West Bromwich Albion	H	W	1–0	Bent	8,777
22 April 1995	Watford	A	L	0–1		7,190
29 April 1995	Reading	H	L	1–2	Tinnion	9,474
7 May 1995	Millwall	A	D	1–1	Allison	8,805

== FA Cup ==
FA Cup match details
Round	Date	Opponents	Venue	Result	Score F–A	Scorers	Attendance
Third round	7 January 1995	Stoke City	H	D	0–0		9,683
Third round replay	18 January 1995	Stoke City	A	W	3–1 (a.e.t.)	Bent, Baird, Tinnion	11,579
Fourth round	29 January 1995	Everton	H	L	0–1		19,816

== Football League Cup ==
Football League Cup match details
Round	Date	Opponents	Venue	Result	Score F–A	Scorers	Attendance
Second round, first leg	20 September 1994	Notts County	H	L	0–1		2,546
Second round, second leg	27 September 1994	Notts County	A	L	0–3		2,721
