= 1993–94 Bristol City F.C. season =

Bristol City
1993–94 season
- Chairman: Les Kew (Until November 1993); David Russe (from November 1993)
- Manager: Russell Osman
- Stadium: Ashton Gate
- First Division: 13th
- FA Cup: Fifth round
- League Cup: First round
- Top goalscorer: League: Wayne Allison (15); All: Wayne Allison (20)

During the 1993–94 season, Bristol City competed in the Football League First Division, in which they finished 13th. They also competed in the FA Cup where they beat Liverpool, but were eliminated in the fifth round. The Football League Cup was a bigger disappointment, with the club being knocked out in the first round.

== First Division ==
=== League table ===
Pos	Team	Pld	W	D	L	GF	GA	GD	Pts
11	Charlton Athletic	46	19	8	19	61	58	+3	65
12	Sunderland	46	19	8	19	54	57	−3	65
13	Bristol City	46	16	16	14	47	50	−3	64
14	Bolton Wanderers	46	15	14	17	63	64	−1	59
15	Southend United	46	17	8	21	63	67	−4	59

Source: rsssf.com
Rules for classification: 1) Points; 2) Goals scored; 3) Goal difference

== Results ==
Bristol City's score comes first

=== Legend ===
Win	Draw	Loss

=== Football League First Division ===
Date	Opponent	Venue	Result	Attendance	Scorers
14 August 1993	Wolves	A	1–3	21,052	Scott
21 August 1993	Crystal Palace	H	2–0	12,068	Baird, Allison
28 August 1993	Derby County	A	0–1	15,643	
4 September 1993	Southend United	H	2–1	7,396	Tinnion (pen), Osman
11 September 1993	Oxford United	A	2–4	5,464	Baird (2)
14 September 1993	Leicester City	H	1–3	7,899	Scott
18 September 1993	Charlton Athletic	H	0–0	7,484	
25 September 1993	Portsmouth	A	0–0	10,702	
2 October 1993	Bolton Wanderers	H	2–0	7,704	Allison, Scott
5 October 1993	Luton Town	A	2–0	5,956	Tinnion (pen), Baird
9 October 1993	Notts County	A	0–2	6,418	
16 October 1993	Barnsley	H	0–2	6,923	
22 October 1993	Tranmere Rovers	A	2–2	7,123	Shail, Allison
30 October 1993	Sunderland	H	2–0	8,162	Allison, Baird
2 November 1993	Birmingham City	H	3–0	9,192	Allison (3)
6 November 1993	Middlesbrough	A	1–0	9,687	Tinnion (pen)
13 November 1993	Millwall	H	2–2	8,416	Allison (2)
20 November 1993	Watford	A	1–1	6,045	Martin
27 November 1993	Peterborough United	A	2–0	5,084	Robinson (2)
4 December 1993	Middlesbrough	H	0–0	8,441	
11 December 1993	Leicester City	A	0–3	13,394	
18 December 1993	Wolves	H	2–1	15,151	Allison, Brown
27 December 1993	West Brom	A	1–0	22,888	Tinnion
28 December 1993	Nottingham Forest	H	1–4	20,725	Edwards
1 January 1994	Grimsby Town	A	0–1	5,469	
3 January 1994	Stoke City	H	0–0	11,132	
15 January 1994	Barnsley	A	1–1	5,222	Scott
22 January 1994	Notts County	H	0–2	7,458	
5 February 1994	Tranmere Rovers	H	2–0	8,171	Tinnion, Allison
12 February 1994	Sunderland	A	0–0	16,816	
22 February 1994	Crystal Palace	A	1–4	11,508	Shail
26 February 1994	Southend United	A	1–0	4,615	Allison
5 March 1994	Derby County	H	0–0	8,723	
15 March 1994	Oxford United	H	0–1	6,635	
19 March 1994	Portsmouth	H	1–0	6,352	Allison
26 March 1994	Bolton Wanderers	A	2–2	10,221	Allison (2)
30 March 1994	Stoke City	A	0–3	13,208	
2 April 1994	West Brom	H	0–0	8,624	
4 April 1994	Nottingham Forest	A	0–0	24,162	
9 April 1994	Grimsby Town	H	1–0	5,480	Scott (pen)
16 April 1994	Birmingham City	A	2–2	20,316	Partridge (2)
19 April 1994	Luton Town	H	1–0	5,350	Edwards
23 April 1994	Watford	H	1–1	8,324	Partridge
30 April 1994	Millwall	A	0–0	11,189	
3 May 1994	Charlton Athletic	A	1–3	6,727	Partridge
8 May 1994	Peterborough United	H	4–1	7,790	Bent (2), Robinson (2)

=== FA Cup ===
Round	Date	Opponent	Venue	Result	Attendance	Goalscorers
R3	19 January 1994	Liverpool	H	1–1	21,718	Allison
R3 Replay	25 January 1994	Liverpool	A	1–0	36,720	Tinnion
R4	8 February 1994	Stockport County	A	4–0	7,691	Allison (3), Shail
R5	19 February 1994	Charlton Athletic	H	1–1	20,416	Tinnion
R5 Replay	2 March 1994	Charlton Athletic	A	0–2	8,205	

=== League Cup ===
Round	Date	Opponent	Venue	Result	Attendance	Goalscorers
R1 1st Leg	17 August 1993	Swansea City	A	1–0	3,746	Robinson
R1 2nd Leg	24 August 1993	Swansea City	H	0–2	4,633	

=== Anglo-Italian Cup ===
Round	Date	Opponent	Venue	Result	Attendance	Goalscorers
Preliminary Round	31 August 1993	Portsmouth	A	1–3	2,318	Munro
Preliminary Round	7 September 1993	Oxford United	H	2–1	1,515	Allison, Rosenior
