= 1996–97 Bristol City F.C. season =

Bristol City
1996–97 season
- Chairman: Scott Davidson
- Manager: Joe Jordan (until 24 March); John Ward (from 27 March)
- Stadium: Ashton Gate Stadium
- Second Division: 5th
- Play-offs: Semi-finals
- FA Cup: Third round
- League Cup: Second round
- Football League Trophy: Quarter finals
- Top goalscorer: League: Goater (23); All: Goater (24)
- Average home league attendance: 10,802

During the 1996–97 English football season, Bristol City F.C. competed in the Football League Second Division.

== Season summary ==
In the 1996–97 season, Bristol City finished in the play-off places but ended up losing to Brentford in the semi-finals. In December 1996, the Robins were involved in a Bristol derby against Bristol Rovers at Ashton Gate that was ruined by crowd violence where after the final whistle, the Bristol Rovers players were assaulted by City fans after Rovers fans spilled onto the pitch after Beadle's equaliser in injury-time. This led to the FA calling for evidence from the match officials and police officers and Bristol City were charged for failing to control the spectators. In March 1997, Jordan left and was replaced by John Ward as manager.

== Final league table ==
Pos	Team	Pld	W	D	L	GF	GA	GD	Pts	Promotion or relegation
3	Luton Town	46	21	15	10	71	45	+26	78	Qualification for the Second Division play-offs
4	Brentford	46	20	14	12	56	43	+13	74	Qualification for the Second Division play-offs
5	Bristol City	46	21	10	15	69	51	+18	73	Qualification for the Second Division play-offs
6	Crewe Alexandra (O, P)	46	22	7	17	56	47	+9	73	Qualification for the Second Division play-offs
7	Blackpool	46	18	15	13	60	47	+13	69	

Rules for classification: In the Football League goals scored (GF) takes precedence over goal difference (GD).
(O) Play-off winners; (P) Promoted

== Results ==
Bristol City's score comes first

=== Legend ===
Win	Draw	Loss

=== Football League Second Division ===
Date	Opponent	Venue	Result	Attendance	Scorers
17 August 1996	Gillingham	A	2–3	7,217	Goater, Bent
24 August 1996	Blackpool	H	0–1	9,387	
27 August 1996	Luton Town	H	5–0	7,028	Goodridge (2), Nugent, Goater, Cundy
31 August 1996	Bury	A	0–4	4,160	
7 September 1996	Preston North End	H	2–1	8,016	Nugent (2)
10 September 1996	Shrewsbury Town	A	0–1	2,502	
14 September 1996	Rotherham United	A	2–2	2,546	Owers (2)
21 September 1996	Walsall	H	4–1	7,412	Goater (2), Hewlett, Goodridge
28 September 1996	Burnley	A	3–2	9,538	Goater (2), Taylor
1 October 1996	Brentford	H	1–2	9,520	Goodridge
5 October 1996	Chesterfield	A	1–1	4,438	Owers
11 October 1996	York City	H	2–0	9,308	Nugent, Goodridge
15 October 1996	Wycombe Wanderers	H	3–0	7,325	Agostino, Barnard, Tinnion
19 October 1996	Plymouth Argyle	A	0–0	9,645	
26 October 1996	Notts County	H	4–0	9,540	Goater (3), Agostino
29 October 1996	Bournemouth	A	2–0	4,197	Barnard (pen), Agostino
2 November 1996	Stockport County	A	1–1	6,654	Blackmore
9 November 1996	Millwall	H	1–1	12,326	Barnard
23 November 1996	Peterborough United	H	2–0	12,312	Goater, Goodridge
30 November 1996	Notts County	A	0–2	4,693	
3 December 1996	Watford	H	1–1	9,097	Barnard (pen)
15 December 1996	Bristol Rovers	H	1–1	18,674	Agostino
21 December 1996	Wrexham	A	1–2	4,488	Hewlett
26 December 1996	Shrewsbury Town	H	3–2	9,803	Agostino, Barnard (pen), Owers
28 December 1996	Preston North End	A	2–0	10,905	Agostino, Goater
11 January 1997	Burnley	H	2–1	10,013	Bent, Goater
18 January 1997	Brentford	A	0–0	7,606	
25 January 1997	Bournemouth	H	0–1	10,434	
1 February 1997	Millwall	A	2–0	9,158	Goater (2, 1 pen)
7 February 1997	Stockport County	H	1–1	13,186	Goater
15 February 1997	Peterborough United	A	1–3	4,221	Barnard (pen)
22 February 1997	Crewe Alexandra	H	3–0	11,306	Goater, Agostino, Westwood (own goal)
1 March 1997	Watford	A	0–3	8,539	
4 March 1997	Walsall	A	0–2	4,322	
16 March 1997	Bristol Rovers	A	2–1	8,078	Agostino, Goater
18 March 1997	Rotherham United	H	0–2	10,646	
22 March 1997	Blackpool	A	0–1	4,518	
25 March 1997	Crewe Alexandra	A	2–1	3,687	Bent, Goater
29 March 1997	Gillingham	H	0–1	11,276	
1 April 1997	Luton Town	A	2–2	7,105	Goater, Agostino
5 April 1997	Bury	H	1–0	10,274	Barnard
15 April 1997	Wrexham	H	2–1	9,817	Barnard (pen), Goater
19 April 1997	York City	A	3–0	3,344	Goater (2), Nugent
26 April 1997	Plymouth Argyle	H	3–1	15,368	Barnard (2, 1 pen), Nugent
30 April 1997	Chesterfield	H	2–0	16,195	Goater, Barnard (pen)
3 May 1997	Wycombe Wanderers	A	0–2	7,240	

=== Second Division play-offs ===
Round	Date	Opponent	Venue	Result	Attendance	Goalscorers
SF 1st Leg	11 May 1997	Brentford	H	1–2	15,581	Owers
SF 2nd Leg	14 May 1997	Brentford	A	1–2 (lost 2–4 on agg)	9,496	Barnard

=== FA Cup ===
Round	Date	Opponent	Venue	Result	Attendance	Goalscorers
R1	16 November 1996	Swansea City	A	1–1	5,629	Kuhl
R1R	26 November 1996	Swansea City	H	1–0	8,017	Agostino
R2	7 December 1996	St Albans City	H	9–2	7,136	Goodridge, Agostino (3), Kuhl, Hewlett (2), Nugent
R3	14 January 1997	Chesterfield	A	0–2	5,193	

=== League Cup ===
Round	Date	Opponent	Venue	Result	Attendance	Goalscorers
R1 1st Leg	20 August 1996	Torquay United	A	3–3	2,824	Goater, Agostino, Partridge
R1 2nd Leg	3 September 1996	Torquay United	H	1–0 (won 4–3 on agg)	4,513	Barnard
R2 1st Leg	18 September 1996	Bolton Wanderers	H	0–0	6,351	
R2 2nd Leg	24 September 1996	Bolton Wanderers	A	1–3 (lost 1–3 on agg)	6,367	Owers

=== Football League Trophy ===
Round	Date	Opponent	Venue	Result	Attendance	Goalscorers
SR2	21 January 1997	Swansea City	A	1–0	5,600	
SQF	11 February 1997	Watford	A	1–2	3,142	

== Squad ==
Note: Flags indicate national team as defined under FIFA eligibility rules; some limited exceptions apply. Players may hold more than one non-FIFA nationality.

No.	Pos.	Nation	Player
—	GK	(England) ENG	Stuart Naylor
—	GK	(England) ENG	Steve Phillips
—	GK	(England) ENG	Keith Welch
—	DF	(Wales) WAL	Darren Barnard
—	DF	(Wales) WAL	Clayton Blackmore (on loan from Middlesbrough)
—	DF	(Canada) CAN	Jim Brennan
—	DF	(Scotland) SCO	Louis Carey
—	DF	(England) ENG	Jason Cundy (on loan from Tottenham Hotspur)
—	DF	(Wales) WAL	Rob Edwards
—	DF	(England) ENG	Kevin Langan
—	DF	(England) ENG	Alan McLeary
—	DF	(Scotland) SCO	Scott Paterson
—	DF	(Sweden) SWE	Mark Shail
—	DF	(England) ENG	Shaun Taylor
—	MF	(England) ENG	Paul Allen

No.	Pos.	Nation	Player
—	MF	(Northern Ireland) NIR	Tommy Doherty
—	MF	(England) ENG	Matthew Hewlett
—	MF	(England) ENG	Martin Kuhl
—	MF	(England) ENG	Gary Owers
—	MF	(England) ENG	Dwayne Plummer
—	MF	(England) ENG	Brian Tinnion
—	FW	(Australia) AUS	Paul Agostino
—	FW	(England) ENG	Dominic Barclay
—	FW	(England) ENG	Junior Bent
—	FW	(Bermuda) BER	Shaun Goater
—	FW	(Barbados) BRB	Gregory Goodridge
—	FW	(England) ENG	Kevin Nugent
—	FW	(England) ENG	Scott Partridge
—	FW	(Australia) AUS	David Seal
