= 1997–98 Football Conference =

Conference National
- Season: 1997–98
- Champions: Halifax Town (1st Football Conference title)
- Direct promotion: Halifax Town
- Conference League Cup winners: Morecambe
- FA Trophy winners: Cheltenham Town (1st FA Trophy title)
- Relegated to Level 6: Gateshead, Slough Town, Stalybridge Celtic
- Matches: 462
- Goals: 1,344 (2.91 per match)
- Top goalscorer: (England) Geoff Horsfield (Halifax Town), 30
- Biggest home win: Farnborough Town – Stalybridge Celtic 6–0 (20 December 1997)
- Biggest away win: Morecambe – Hereford 1–5 (1 November 1997); Stevenage – Hayes 1–5 (1 September 1997); Dover – Kidderminster 0–4 (20 September 1997); Kettering – Rushden & Diamonds 0–4 (21 February 1998); Leek – Kettering 0–4 (31 March 1998)
- Highest scoring: Hayes – Yeovil Town 6–4 (14 February 1998); Rushden & Diamonds – Farnborough Town 5–5 (13 September 1997)
- Longest winning run: Halifax Town, 8 matches
- Longest unbeaten run: Cheltenham Town, 17 matches
- Longest losing run: Farnborough Town, Stalybridge Celtic, 7 matches
- Highest attendance: Halifax Town v Cheltenham Town, 6,357 (25 April 1998)
- Lowest attendance: ?
- Average attendance: ?

The Football Conference season of 1997–98 was the nineteenth season of the Football Conference, also known as the Vauxhall Conference for sponsorship reasons.

== Changes since the previous season ==
- Hereford United (relegated from the Football League 1996–97)
- Cheltenham Town (promoted 1996–97)
- Leek Town (promoted 1996–97)
- Yeovil Town (promoted 1996–97)

== Final league table ==
Pos	Team	Pld	W	D	L	GF	GA	GD	Pts	Promotion or relegation
1	Halifax Town (C, P)	42	25	12	5	74	43	+31	87	Promotion to the Football League Third Division
2	Cheltenham Town	42	23	9	10	63	43	+20	78	
3	Woking	42	22	8	12	72	46	+26	74	
4	Rushden & Diamonds	42	23	5	14	79	57	+22	74	
5	Morecambe	42	21	10	11	77	64	+13	73	
6	Hereford United	42	18	13	11	56	49	+7	67	
7	Hednesford Town	42	18	12	12	59	50	+9	66	
8	Slough Town (R)	42	18	10	14	58	49	+9	64	Demoted to the Isthmian League Premier Division (Note: Slough Town were demoted to the Isthmian League Premier Division due to their ground no longer meeting Football Conference requirements.)
9	Northwich Victoria	42	15	15	12	63	59	+4	60	
10	Welling United	42	17	9	16	64	62	+2	60	
11	Yeovil Town	42	17	8	17	73	63	+10	59	
12	Hayes	42	16	10	16	62	52	+10	58	
13	Dover Athletic	42	15	10	17	60	70	−10	55	
14	Kettering Town	42	13	13	16	53	60	−7	52	
15	Stevenage Borough	42	13	12	17	59	63	−4	51	
16	Southport	42	13	11	18	56	58	−2	50	
17	Kidderminster Harriers	42	11	14	17	56	63	−7	47	
18	Farnborough Town	42	12	8	22	56	70	−14	44	
19	Leek Town	42	10	14	18	52	67	−15	44	
20	Telford United	42	10	12	20	53	76	−23	42	
21	Gateshead (R)	42	8	11	23	51	87	−36	35	Relegation to the Northern Premier League Premier Division
22	Stalybridge Celtic (R)	42	7	8	27	48	93	−45	29	Relegation to the Northern Premier League Premier Division

(C) Champions; (P) Promoted; (R) Relegated

== Results ==
Home \ Away	CHL	DOV	FAR	GAT	HAL	HAY	HED	HER	KET	KID	LEE	MOR	NOR	R&D	SLO	SOU	STL	STB	TEL	WEL	WOK	YEO
Cheltenham Town		3–1	1–0	2–0	4–0	2–1	1–0	1–2	2–0	0–1	1–1	2–1	3–2	2–0	1–1	2–0	2–0	1–1	3–1	1–1	3–2	2–0
Dover Athletic	3–0		2–2	0–1	0–1	1–0	1–3	1–1	0–0	0–4	2–1	2–3	4–0	0–3	2–1	3–1	3–1	1–1	6–3	2–1	0–2	1–0
Farnborough Town	1–2	1–0		4–0	1–2	0–2	1–3	0–2	3–2	3–3	2–0	0–2	2–3	2–0	1–0	3–2	6–0	1–2	1–0	0–0	3–0	2–2
Gateshead	0–0	1–2	3–0		2–2	1–1	2–5	1–1	2–0	2–0	0–2	1–4	2–2	2–1	5–1	0–2	3–3	2–1	0–2	2–1	1–2	0–3
Halifax Town	1–1	1–1	1–0	2–0		1–1	1–1	3–0	3–0	2–1	2–1	5–1	4–2	2–0	1–0	4–3	3–1	4–0	6–1	1–0	1–0	3–1
Hayes	1–1	0–0	3–1	1–0	1–2		4–0	2–0	0–1	1–1	3–1	0–3	1–1	1–2	0–1	2–0	1–2	1–3	2–1	3–1	3–0	6–4
Hednesford Town	0–1	1–0	1–0	3–0	0–0	2–1		1–1	1–1	3–0	1–0	0–1	2–0	0–1	2–1	2–1	1–0	2–1	1–0	3–2	1–1	1–0
Hereford United	3–2	0–1	2–1	1–0	0–0	3–0	2–1		3–2	1–0	1–0	1–0	2–2	1–1	1–1	1–1	3–0	0–2	1–1	1–2	2–1	1–1
Kettering Town	0–1	2–1	2–1	3–0	1–1	1–1	2–1	1–2		2–2	1–0	1–1	1–3	0–4	3–3	2–1	3–1	2–0	1–3	0–1	0–1	1–1
Kidderminster Harriers	1–2	3–3	2–0	1–1	0–2	1–0	1–1	1–4	4–1		1–1	1–4	1–1	1–2	0–1	1–1	5–0	1–3	1–1	2–1	1–1	3–1
Leek Town	0–0	5–1	3–1	2–2	2–0	1–2	3–3	2–2	0–4	0–0		1–1	1–1	2–0	0–2	0–1	2–2	2–1	3–1	1–2	2–0	2–0
Morecambe	1–0	3–3	1–1	2–0	1–1	0–2	1–3	1–5	1–3	3–1	1–1		3–1	3–1	2–1	2–0	3–1	0–2	1–0	4–2	1–2	1–0
Northwich Victoria	2–1	2–1	3–3	1–1	2–0	1–1	1–1	0–2	0–0	1–1	3–1	5–0		2–4	0–1	0–0	1–0	1–0	2–2	5–1	0–2	2–1
Rushden & Diamonds	4–1	4–1	5–5	3–2	4–0	1–3	1–1	1–0	1–0	4–1	0–1	3–3	0–1		0–1	1–0	3–0	2–0	3–2	0–1	2–1	2–2
Slough Town	1–2	2–4	1–0	1–0	1–1	0–0	2–0	3–0	1–1	2–0	1–1	3–3	3–0	1–2		1–0	4–0	3–1	1–0	1–2	1–3	1–1
Southport	1–2	0–1	3–1	3–1	0–0	0–2	4–1	0–0	2–1	1–2	2–2	1–1	0–2	3–2	1–2		4–2	1–0	1–2	3–1	0–0	2–1
Stalybridge Celtic	1–4	1–0	1–1	2–2	0–1	1–1	1–1	2–3	3–4	2–1	6–1	3–1	0–1	2–4	0–1	1–3		1–1	1–2	2–1	0–3	3–2
Stevenage Borough	1–2	2–2	5–0	6–1	1–2	1–5	1–1	2–0	0–0	3–1	1–1	0–3	1–3	2–1	4–2	1–0	1–1		1–1	0–0	0–0	2–1
Telford United	0–0	0–1	0–1	4–4	0–3	1–0	1–1	0–0	1–1	1–1	3–0	1–3	2–1	4–2	0–1	2–2	1–0	3–0		0–3	0–3	1–4
Welling United	2–1	2–2	1–0	2–0	6–2	2–0	3–2	3–0	2–2	0–3	2–0	2–2	0–1	0–1	1–1	3–5	1–0	1–0	4–1		1–1	1–3
Woking	2–0	4–0	3–0	3–1	2–2	3–0	4–2	3–1	0–1	0–1	5–2	0–2	1–0	0–2	2–1	1–1	3–1	5–3	1–1	3–1		2–0
Yeovil Town	3–1	4–1	0–1	6–3	0–1	4–3	1–0	2–0	2–0	1–0	3–1	2–3	2–2	1–2	2–1	0–0	2–0	2–1	5–3	1–1	2–0	

Updated to match(es) played on unknown. Source: Glenda Rollin (ed.), Jack Rollin (exec. ed.), Rothmans Football Yearbook 1998–99. Headline, 1998.
Legend: Blue = home team win; Yellow = draw; Red = away team win.
Locations of the Football Conference 1997–1998 teams
Locations of the Football Conference London teams 1997–1998

== Top scorers in order of league goals ==
Rank	Player	Club	League	FA Cup	FA Trophy	League Cup	Total
1	(England) Geoff Horsfield	Halifax Town	30	4	0	0	34
2	(England) Darren Collins	Rushden & Diamonds	29	0	3	0	32
3	(England) Darran Hay	Woking	20	0	0	1	21
4	(England) Mark Cooper	Welling United	18	1	0	0	19
=	(England) John Norman	Morecambe	18	0	0	3	21
6	(England) Neil Grayson	Hereford United & Cheltenham Town	17	4	0	1	22
7	(England) Owen Pickard	Yeovil Town	17	6	0	1	24
=	(England) Dale Watkins	Cheltenham Town	17	4	7	1	29
=	(England) Mike Bignall	Kidderminster Harriers	16	1	0	0	17
=	(England) Brendan Burke	Stalybridge Celtic	16	2	1	1	20
=	(England) Jason Eaton	Cheltenham Town	16	2	4	0	22
=	(England) David Mehew	Rushden & Diamonds	16	1	0	0	17
=	(England) Warren Patmore	Yeovil Town	16	0	0	1	17
14	(England) Ritchie Hanlon	Welling United	15	0	0	0	15
=	(England) Martin Randall	Hayes	15	0	2	2	19
16	(Scotland) Jamie Paterson	Halifax Town	14	3	1	0	18
=	(England) Grant Payne	Woking	14	0	0	1	15
=	(England) Chris Pearson	Kettering Town	14	0	0	0	14
19	(England) Andy Milner	Morecambe	13	0	0	2	15
20	(England) Steve Bowey	Gateshead	12	1	1	0	14
=	(England) Jimmy Strouts	Dover Athletic	12	0	0	1	13

- Footballtransfers.co.uk contains information on many players on whom there is not yet an article in Wikipedia.
