= Andy Leaning =

English association football player (born 1963)

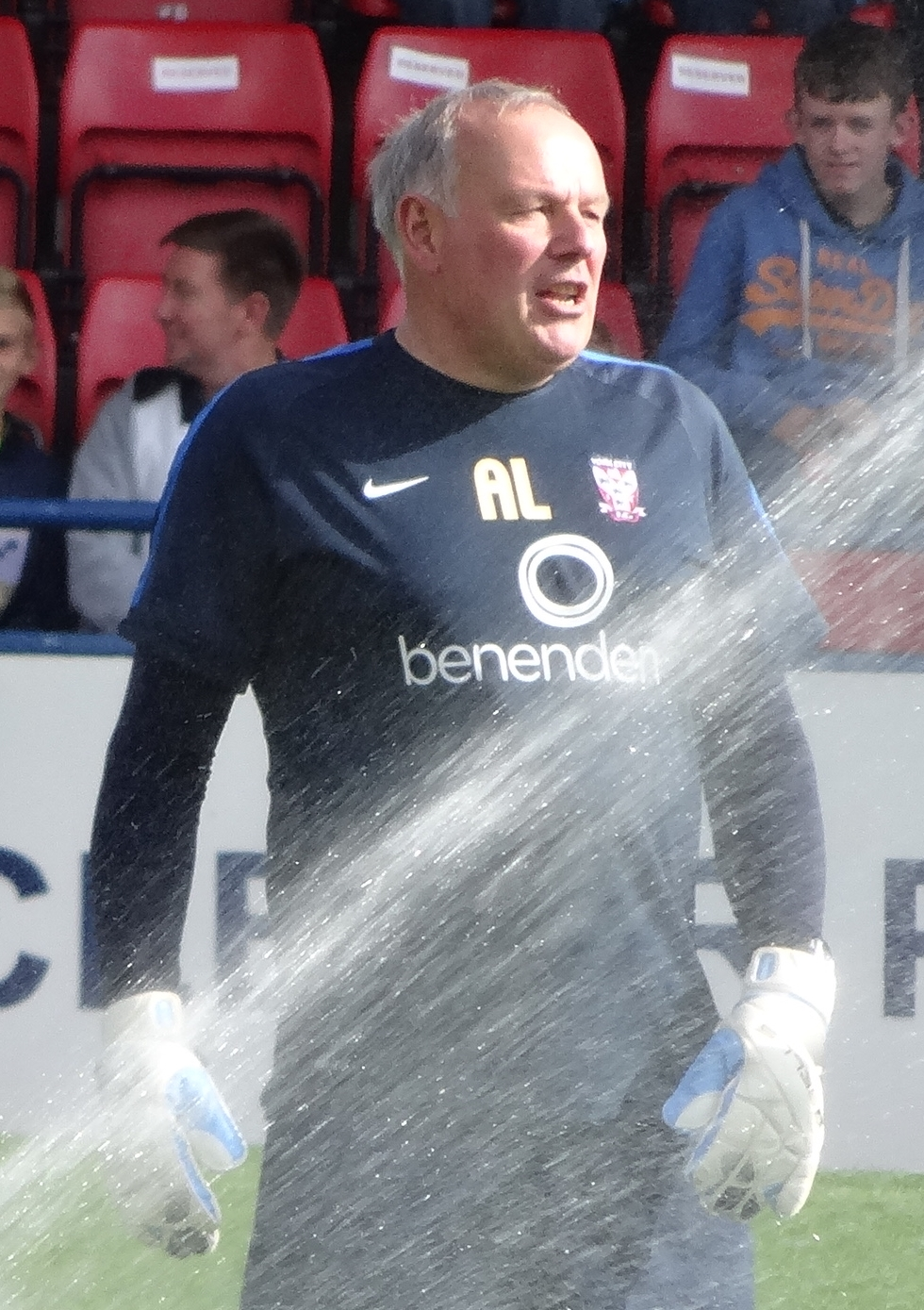
- Leaning with York City in 2015

Personal information
- Full name: Andrew John Leaning
- Date of birth: 18 May 1963 (age 63)
- Place of birth: Howden, England
- Height: 6 ft 1 in (1.85 m)
- Position: Goalkeeper

Senior career*
Years	Team	Apps	(Gls)
- York Railway Institute
–1985	Rowntree Mackintosh		
1985–1987	York City	69	(0)
1987–1988	Sheffield United	21	(0)
1988–1994	Bristol City	75	(0)
1994–1996	Lincoln City	36	(0)
1996	Dundee	0	(0)
1996–2000	Chesterfield	22	(0)
Total		223	(0)
- * Club domestic league appearances and goals

Andrew John Leaning (born 18 May 1963) is an English former professional footballer who played as a goalkeeper, and has since been employed as a goalkeeping coach.

Having started his career in the amateur game with York Railway Institute and Rowntree Mackintosh, he turned professional when he joined York City in 1985. From there, Leaning went on to have spells at Sheffield United, Bristol City, Lincoln City, Dundee and Chesterfield, before retiring from playing in 2000. Throughout his 15-year career in professional football, he made 282 league and cup appearances. He was promoted with Bristol City after a second-place finish in the Third Division in 1989–90, and was named as Lincoln City's Player of the Year in 1995. Since 2000, he has been a goalkeeping coach at several of his former clubs, including York City, Sheffield United, and Chesterfield, as well as Leeds United.

== Playing career ==
Leaning had trials with York City in 1979 at the age of 16 and he went on to play for York Railway Institute and Rowntree Mackintosh in the Northern Counties East Football League as an amateur while working for British Rail. He later played in York's reserve team and was offered the chance to turn professional with the Third Division club in July 1985. Following an injury to first-choice goalkeeper Mike Astbury, Leaning made his first team debut in a 1–1 draw at Newport County on 6 November. He played in all of York's seven FA Cup games in the 1985–86 season and his "finest" performance came in York's 3–1 defeat after extra time against Liverpool at Anfield in the fifth round on 18 February 1986, being named man of the match following a "heroic" performance. He was able to do a "fine job" in Astbury's absence during the 1985–86 season, which he finished with 39 appearances in all competitions. He made 47 appearances for York in all competitions in the 1986–87 season.

Having made 86 appearances for York in all competitions, he was allowed to leave the club in 1987 and following a brief trial with Everton in May 1987, where he played one game in the reserves, he joined Second Division team Sheffield United on 28 May. He made 25 appearances in all competitions for United before signing for Third Division team Bristol City for a fee of £12,000 in November 1988, having initially joined on a month's loan on 27 September. He made 19 league appearances during the 1989–90 season as City secured promotion out of the Third Division with a second-place finish. After making 89 appearances for City in all competitions, he joined the Third Division team Lincoln City on 24 March 1994. He made his debut in a 2–1 defeat to Crewe Alexandra on 26 March. He was named the club's Player of the Year for the 1994–95 season. While at Lincoln, supporters would chant lyrics from George Formby's "Leaning on a Lamppost" in recognition of Leaning. After making 51 appearances in all competitions for Lincoln, he signed for Scottish First Division team Dundee in August 1996. He returned to England after signing for Second Division team Chesterfield in October 1996, where he made 29 appearances before retiring in 2000.

== Coaching career ==
Following his retirement from playing, Leaning moved into specialist coaching and he became goalkeeping coach at Chesterfield, later having appointments at Scarborough and Barnsley. He holds UEFA 'A' licences in coaching and goalkeeping coaching. He worked as a coach for the York College Football Development Centre in 2006. He became goalkeeping coach at former club Sheffield United at the beginning of the 2002–03 season, before leaving the club in May 2010. Leaning was appointed goalkeeping coach at former club York City on a part-time basis on 8 July 2010. He departed the club a little under a year later, on 16 June 2011, after the appointment of Paul Musselwhite as a player-goalkeeping coach. He joined Leeds United as an academy goalkeeping coach in 2012 and later coached the club's first-team goalkeepers before leaving in July 2014. Leaning returned to York for a second spell as goalkeeping coach on 19 May 2015, working under manager Russ Wilcox. Jackie McNamara later became manager, and Leaning left the club on 8 December 2015. Some weeks later he was briefly employed as a goalkeeping coach at Port Vale.

== Personal life ==
Born in Howden, East Riding of Yorkshire, Leaning's son Jack is a cricketer who has represented Yorkshire at junior level from the age of 11. In June 2008, his unbeaten 164 for the county under-14 team against Cheshire was the highest score ever by a Yorkshire youth player.

== Career statistics ==
Appearances and goals by club, season and competition
Club	Season	League			FA Cup		Other		Total	
Club	Season	Division	Apps	Goals	Apps	Goals	Apps	Goals	Apps	Goals
York City	1985–86	Third Division	30	0	7	0	2	0	39	0
York City	1986–87	Third Division	39	0	1	0	7	0	47	0
York City	Total		69	0	8	0	9	0	86	0
Sheffield United	1987–88	Second Division	21	0	2	0	2	0	25	0
Bristol City	1988–89	Third Division	6	0	0	0	2	0	8	0
Bristol City	1989–90	Third Division	19	0	2	0	5	0	26	0
Bristol City	1990–91	Second Division	29	0	1	0	1	0	31	0
Bristol City	1991–92	Second Division	20	0	4	0	1	0	25	0
Bristol City	1992–93	First Division	1	0	0	0	0	0	1	0
Bristol City	Total		75	0	7	0	9	0	91	0
Lincoln City	1993–94	Third Division	8	0	0	0	0	0	8	0
Lincoln City	1994–95	Third Division	21	0	3	0	6	0	30	0
Lincoln City	1995–96	Third Division	7	0	0	0	6	0	13	0
Lincoln City	Total		36	0	3	0	12	0	51	0
Dundee	1996–97	Scottish First Division	0	0	0	0	0	0	0	0
Chesterfield	1996–97	Second Division	9	0	0	0	1	0	10	0
Chesterfield	1997–98	Second Division	5	0	2	0	0	0	7	0
Chesterfield	1998–99	Second Division	2	0	0	0	2	0	4	0
Chesterfield	1999–2000	Second Division	6	0	0	0	2	0	8	0
Chesterfield	Total		22	0	2	0	5	0	29	0
Career total (Note: Appearances in non-League football for York Railway Institute and Rowntree Mackintosh not recorded.)			223	0	22	0	37	0	282	0

== Honours ==
Individual

- Lincoln City F.C. Player of the Year: 1995

Bristol City

- Football League Third Division second-place promotion: 1989–90
