= Ronnie McQuilter =

Scottish footballer

Personal information
- Date of birth: 24 December 1970 (age 55)
- Place of birth: Glasgow, Scotland
- Height: 6 ft 1 in (1.85 m)
- Position: Central defender

Youth career
- Bishopbriggs B.C.

Senior career*
| Years | Team | Apps | (Gls) |
| 1988–1990 | Bristol City | 0 | (0) |
| 1990–1991 | Hamilton Academical | 13 | (0) |
| 1991–1993 | Kilmarnock | 1 | (0) |
| 1993 | Ayr United | 8 | (0) |
| 1993–1997 | Stirling Albion | 121 | (7) |
| 1998–2000 | St Mirren | 29 | (0) |
| 2000 | Clydebank | 3 | (0) |
| 2000 | Stranraer | 1 | (0) |
| 2000–2001 | Queen of the South | 24 | (0) |
| 2001–2002 | Brisbane Strikers | 10 | (0) |
| 2002–2003 | Gretna | 16 | (0) |
| 2003–2005 | Stenhousemuir | 8 | (1) |
- Bellshill Athletic
| Total | | 234 | (8) |
- * Club domestic league appearances and goals

Ronnie McQuilter (born 24 December 1970) is a Scottish former professional footballer who played as a central defender.

== Career ==
Born in Glasgow, McQuilter played for Bishopbriggs B.C., Bristol City, Hamilton Academical, Kilmarnock, Ayr United, Stirling Albion, St Mirren, Clydebank, Stranraer, Queen of the South, the Brisbane Strikers, Gretna, Stenhousemuir and Bellshill Athletic. McQuilter left Stirling Albion at the start of the 1997–98 on the Bosman ruling; he moved to England in the hope of signing for a "bigger club". Unable to find one, he signed on the dole instead.
