= Ronnie Sinclair =

Scottish footballer and coach

Personal information
- Full name: Ronald McDonald Sinclair
- Date of birth: 19 November 1964 (age 61)
- Place of birth: Stirling, Scotland
- Height: 5 ft 11 in (1.80 m)
- Position: Goalkeeper

Youth career
- Stirling Boys Club
- 1981–1982: Nottingham Forest

Senior career*
Years	Team	Apps	(Gls)
1982–1986	Nottingham Forest	0	(0)
1984	→ Wrexham (loan)	11	(0)
1984	→ Derby County (loan)	0	(0)
1985	→ Sheffield United (loan)	0	(0)
1986	→ Leeds United (loan)	0	(0)
1986–1989	Leeds United	8	(0)
1987	→ Halifax Town (loan)	4	(0)
1988–1989	→ Halifax Town (loan)	10	(0)
1989–1991	Bristol City	44	(0)
1991	→ Walsall (loan)	10	(0)
1991–1996	Stoke City	80	(0)
1994	→ Bradford City (loan)	0	(0)
1996–1998	Chester City	70	(0)
1998	Stoke City	0	(0)
1999	Leek Town	4	(0)
1999–2000	Witton Albion		
Total		241	(0)

International career
- Scotland Youth
- * Club domestic league appearances and goals

Ronald McDonald Sinclair (born 19 November 1964) is a Scottish former professional footballer who played as a goalkeeper.

As a player he made 275 league and cup appearances in a 16-year professional career in the English Football League with Nottingham Forest, Leeds United, Bristol City, Stoke City and Chester City, as well as spells on loan with Wrexham, Derby County, Sheffield United, Halifax Town, Walsall and Bradford City. He won promotion out of the Third Division with Bristol City in 1989–90 and out of the Second Division with Stoke City in 1992–93, and was voted as Chester City's Player of the Season for 1996–97. He later went on to coach at Stoke City, Aston Villa and Port Vale.

== Playing career ==
Capped by Scotland at youth and schoolboy level, Sinclair joined Nottingham Forest as an apprentice from Stirling Boys Club, and he signed professional forms in October 1982. However, he failed to make a first-team appearance for the City Ground club. It was in a loan spell with Fourth Division side Wrexham in the closing stages of the 1983–84 season that Sinclair gained his first Football League action. Over the following two seasons, he spent time on loan with Derby County, Sheffield United and Leeds United without making the first-team. Still, he was snapped up permanently by Leeds in June 1986 for £10,000. He made eight league appearances the following season before twice joining Halifax Town on loan.

In September 1989 Sinclair moved to Bristol City, who he helped win promotion from Third Division in his first season at Ashton Gate. By the early stages of the 1991–92 campaign, he was out on loan again though, spending time with Walsall before beginning a five-year stay with Stoke City in a £25,000 move in November 1991. Sinclair faced regular competition for the goalkeeper's shirt with Stoke but played over 20 games in his first three seasons at the club.

After falling out of favour, Sinclair joined Chester City on a free transfer in August 1996. After conceding just 43 goals in 1996–97, Chester qualified for the Third Division play-offs with Sinclair voted the club's Player of the Season. The Blues lost to Swansea City in the semi-finals and the following season saw Sinclair miss 13 league games following the emergence of Wayne Brown. He was not selected again after a 5–0 thrashing at Exeter City on 4 April 1998 and manager Kevin Ratcliffe announced later in the month that Sinclair's contract would not be renewed. He later played four Northern Premier League Premier Division games for Leek Town, before signing with Witton Albion in December 1999 after manager Nigel Gleghorn looked to rest first-choice goalkeeper Phil McGing. He made his debut for Witton on 4 December 1999 and made 15 appearances as the club finished third in the Northern Premier League Division One at the end of the 1999–2000 season, missing out on promotion and the league title on goal difference.

== Coaching career ==
Sinclair never played professionally again after leaving Chester and has spent most of his time working as goalkeeping coach with Stoke City, where he initially was registered again as a player. He became the assistant academy manager before moving to become the academy goalkeeping coach at Aston Villa. He was appointed as goalkeeping coach at Port Vale by manager Neil Aspin in December 2017.

== Career statistics ==
Appearances and goals by club, season and competition
Club	Season	League			FA Cup		League Cup		Other^{[A]}		Total	
Club	Season	Division	Apps	Goals	Apps	Goals	Apps	Goals	Apps	Goals	Apps	Goals
Wrexham (loan)	1983–84	Fourth Division	11	0	0	0	0	0	1	0	12	0
Leeds United	1986–87	Second Division	8	0	0	0	1	0	0	0	9	0
Halifax Town (loan)	1986–87	Fourth Division	4	0	0	0	0	0	0	0	4	0
Halifax Town (loan)	1988–89	Fourth Division	10	0	0	0	0	0	1	0	11	0
Halifax Town (loan)	Total		14	0	0	0	0	0	1	0	15	0
Bristol City	1989–90	Third Division	27	0	5	0	0	0	0	0	32	0
Bristol City	1990–91	Second Division	17	0	0	0	3	0	1	0	21	0
Bristol City	Total		44	0	5	0	3	0	1	0	53	0
Walsall (loan)	1991–92	Fourth Division	10	0	0	0	0	0	1	0	11	0
Stoke City	1991–92	Third Division	26	0	0	0	0	0	2	0	28	0
Stoke City	1992–93	Second Division	29	0	2	0	2	0	5	0	38	0
Stoke City	1993–94	First Division	0	0	0	0	0	0	0	0	0	0
Stoke City	1994–95	First Division	24	0	2	0	0	0	2	0	28	0
Stoke City	1995–96	First Division	1	0	0	0	0	0	1	0	2	0
Stoke City	Total		80	0	4	0	2	0	10	0	96	0
Chester City	1996–97	Third Division	37	0	3	0	1	0	3	0	44	0
Chester City	1997–98	Third Division	33	0	0	0	2	0	0	0	35	0
Chester City	Total		70	0	3	0	3	0	3	0	79	0
Leek Town	1996–97	Northern Premier League; Premier Division	4	0	0	0	—		0	0	4	0
Career total			241	0	12	0	9	0	17	0	279	0

A. The "Other" column constitutes appearances and goals in the Anglo-Italian Cup, Football League Trophy, Football League play-offs and Full Members' Cup.

== Honours ==
Bristol City

- Football League Third Division second-place promotion: 1989–90

Stoke City

- Football League Second Division: 1992–93

Individual

- Chester City Player of the Season: 1996–97
