= Dominic Barclay =

English footballer

Personal information
- Date of birth: 5 September 1976 (age 50)
- Place of birth: Bristol, England
- Height: 5 ft 10 in (1.78 m)
- Position: Forward

Youth career
- 1993–1995: Bristol City

Senior career*
Years	Team	Apps	(Gls)
1995–1998	Bristol City	12	(0)
1996	→ Bangor City (loan)	2	(0)
1998–2000	Macclesfield Town	9	(1)
1999	→ Kettering Town (loan)	?	(?)
2000	→ Chippenham Town (loan)	?	(?)
	Sutton United	?	(?)
	Gloucester City	?	(?)
Total		23	(1)
- * Club domestic league appearances and goals

Dominic Alexander Barclay (born 5 September 1976) is an English footballer who played as a forward in the Football League.
