= Terry Connor =

English footballer (born 1962)

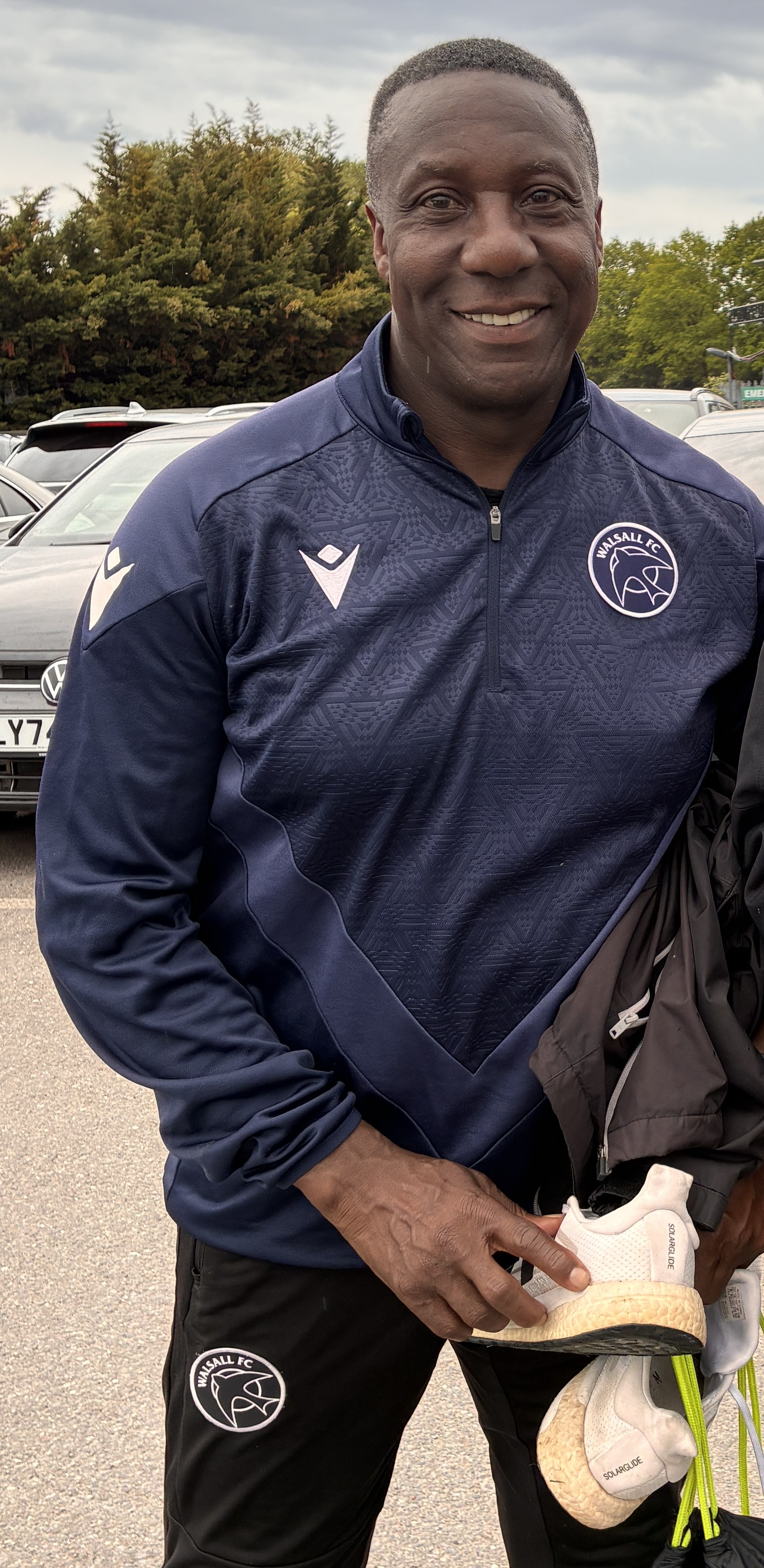
- Connor in 2026

Personal information
- Full name: Terence Fitzroy Connor
- Date of birth: 9 November 1962 (age 63)
- Place of birth: Leeds, England
- Height: 5 ft 7 in (1.70 m)
- Position: Striker

Youth career
- Leeds City

Senior career*
Years	Team	Apps	(Gls)
1979–1983	Leeds United	96	(19)
1983–1987	Brighton & Hove Albion	156	(51)
1987–1990	Portsmouth	48	(14)
1990–1991	Swansea City	39	(6)
1991–1993	Bristol City	16	(1)
1992	→ Swansea City (loan)	3	(0)
1993–1994	Yeovil Town	14	(0)
Total		372	(91)

International career
1980–1981	England Youth	9	(4)
1986	England U21	1	(1)

Managerial career
- 2012: Wolverhampton Wanderers
- 2023–2024: Grenada
- * Club domestic league appearances and goals

Terence Fitzroy Connor (born 9 November 1962) is an English football coach and former professional footballer.

He was born in Leeds and was a pupil at Foxwood School, Seacroft, Leeds. As a player, Connor scored 91 goals from 358 games in the Football League as a striker playing for Leeds United, Brighton & Hove Albion, Portsmouth, Swansea City and Bristol City. He was capped once for the England under-21 team.

He moved into coaching following his playing retirement, briefly working as a coach at both Bristol Rovers and Bristol City before joining Wolves in 1999. After holding a variety of positions he served as Wolves' manager for thirteen games during their Premier League relegation in 2012.

== Playing career ==
Connor scored on his senior debut for Leeds United aged 17, in a 1–0 win over West Bromwich Albion on 17 November 1979. He made 108 appearances in total for Leeds over four seasons, scoring 22 goals. He joined Brighton & Hove Albion in exchange for Andy Ritchie, in March 1983. However, he was unable to appear in their FA Cup Final appearance just months later as he was already cup-tied. The club ended the season relegated. The majority of Connor's games for Brighton came in the Second Division. His form here won him an England under-21 cap in November 1986, when he played and scored against Yugoslavia under-21. He scored 51 goals in 156 appearances before leaving Brighton as they dropped into the third tier in 1987. One of his most memorable goals for Brighton came when they knocked Liverpool out of the 1983-84 FA Cup, a season in which Liverpool won the Football League Cup, European Cup and were crowned English champions. He moved along the South Coast to sign for Portsmouth in a £200,000 deal.

Portsmouth were newly promoted to the First Division at the time of Connor's arrival, but despite his goals they were relegated after just one season. He remained at Fratton Park for three seasons before joining Swansea City for £150,000 in August 1990. After a solitary full season with the Swans in the third tier, he moved to Bristol City in September 1991. He failed to make much impact at Bristol City, playing just 16 times and scoring once; he was also briefly loaned back to Swansea in autumn 1992. He dropped into non-League football in summer 1993 when he signed for Conference club Yeovil Town.

== Coaching career ==
=== Early roles ===
After retiring, he became one of the coaching staff at Swindon Town. Later, Connor and family friend Maurice Gardner turned to coaching, working under John Ward at Bristol Rovers, before moving across the city to work at Bristol City.

=== Move to Wolves ===
After John Ward moved to become assistant manager at Wolverhampton Wanderers, he recruited Connor to their coaching staff in August 1999.

Connor served as a coach – at youth, reserve and first team level – under a succession of Wolves' managers before being promoted to assistant manager under Mick McCarthy in August 2008.

==== Promotion to manager ====
In February 2012, he was given the role of manager by Wolves until the end of the current season, after the sacking of Mick McCarthy. chief executive Jez Moxey confirmed that the position was offered to one other candidate, widely considered by the media to be Alan Curbishley, who refused the position before Connor was appointed. This was despite Moxey previously stating that the job would be given to an experienced manager.

Connor took charge with Wolves in 18th place, one of five teams at the foot of the table looking to avoid the three relegation places. His first game in charge brought a 2–2 draw at Newcastle United on 25 February 2012. However, his side then suffered seven consecutive defeats which left them rooted to the bottom of the table and were relegated on 22 April after a 0–2 defeat to Manchester City. In his thirteen games, he failed to achieve any wins and gained only four points from a possible 39. The team finished bottom of the table with one of the lowest points tallies in their history (25).

In May 2012 Wolves announced that Connor would be succeeded by Ståle Solbakken as a permanent appointment during the summer. Connor had also been interviewed for the position. It was agreed that he would return to his position as assistant manager following Solbakken's appointment, but he departed after just four games of the new season.

=== Ipswich Town ===
On 1 November 2012, Connor renewed his working relationship with Mick McCarthy, as he was appointed Ipswich Town's new assistant manager after McCarthy took charge at the club. On 2 February 2013, Connor took charge of Ipswich while McCarthy was ill and won 4–0 against Middlesbrough.

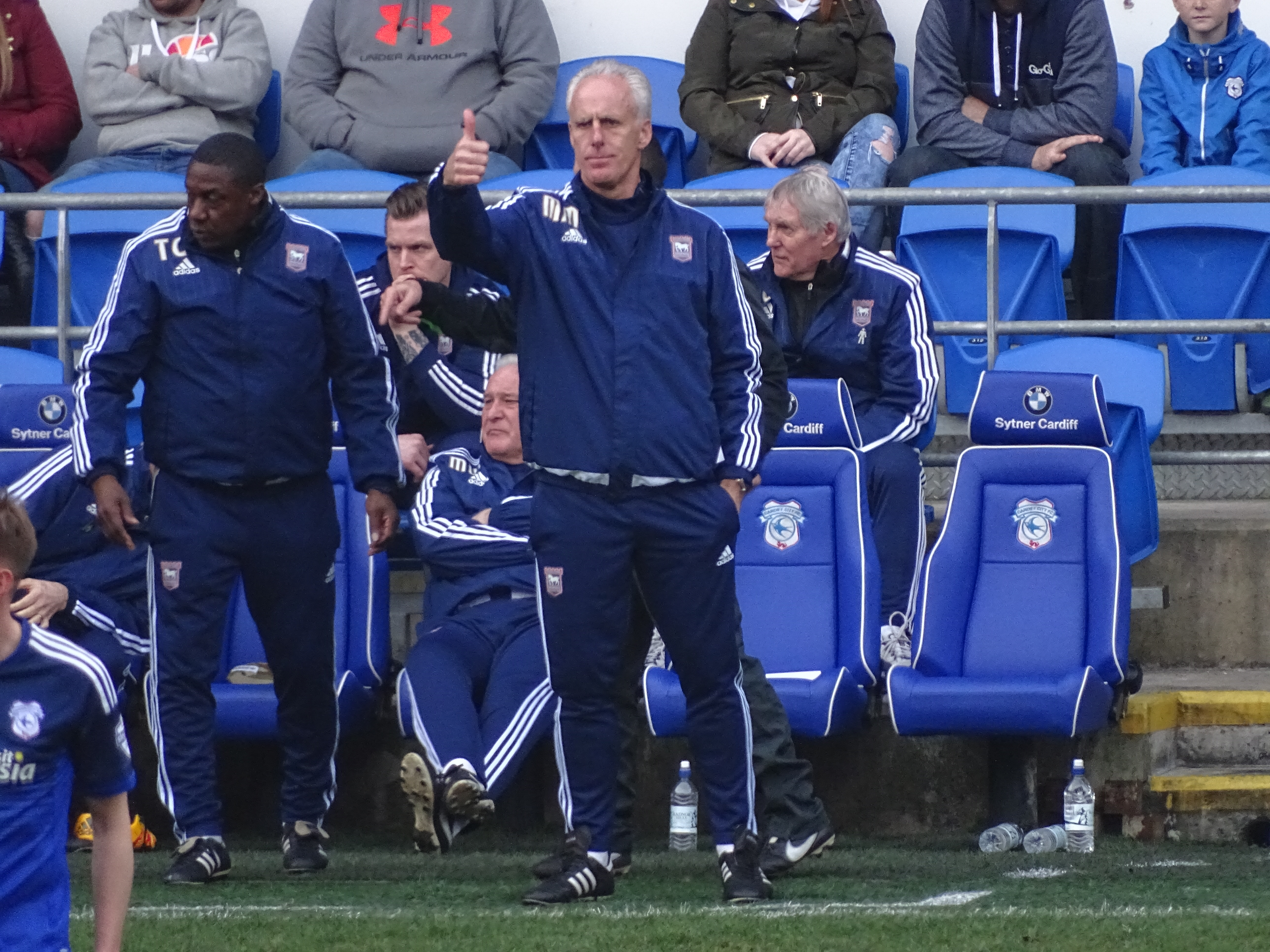
Connor (left) with Mick McCarthy during their time at Ipswich Town

On 30 June 2014 McCarthy and Connor agreed a new three-year deal with Ipswich. On 10 April 2018 they left Ipswich Town and cut the contract short with a 1–0 win over Barnsley.

=== Republic of Ireland ===
On 25 November 2018, the FAI announced that Connor would be the assistant coach of the Republic of Ireland for their upcoming European Championships 2020 campaign, joining Mick McCarthy.

=== After Ireland ===
After his role with the Republic of Ireland, Connor followed McCarthy back into club football and worked on the coaching staff at APOEL, Cardiff City and then Blackpool.

=== Grenada ===
On 16 May 2023, Connor was announced as head coach of the Grenada national team.

=== Return to England ===
In January 2025, Connor was appointed assistant manager of National League side Dagenham & Redbridge.

In July 2025, Connor was appointed assistant coach of National League club Solihull Moors.

Connor had a temporary spell at Walsall.

== Managerial statistics ==
As of 30 May 2025

Managerial record by team and tenure
Team	From	To	Record				
Team	From	To	P	W	D	L	Win %
Wolverhampton Wanderers	24 February 2012	1 July 2012	13	0	4	9	0.0
Grenada	16 May 2023	Present	18	3	6	9	16.7
Total			31	3	10	18	9.7
