= Mark Gavin =

Scottish footballer

Personal information
- Full name: Mark Wilson Gavin
- Date of birth: 10 December 1963
- Place of birth: Baillieston, Scotland
- Height: 5 ft 6 in (1.68 m)
- Position: Winger

Youth career
- Leeds United

Senior career*
| Years | Team | Apps | (Gls) |
| 1981–1985 | Leeds United | 30 | (?) |
| 1985 | → Hartlepool United (loan) | 7 | (1) |
| 1985–1986 | Carlisle United | 13 | (1) |
| 1986–1987 | Bolton Wanderers | 49 | (3) |
| 1987–1988 | Rochdale | 23 | (6) |
| 1988 | Heart of Midlothian | 9 | (0) |
| 1988–1990 | Bristol City | 69 | (6) |
| 1990–1991 | Watford | 13 | (0) |
| 1991–1994 | Bristol City | 41 | (2) |
| 1994–1996 | Exeter City | 77 | (4) |
| 1996–1997 | Scunthorpe United | 11 | (0) |
| 1997 | Hartlepool United | 3 | (0) |
| 1997–1998 | Greenock Morton | 1 | (0) |
| Total | | 346 | (26) |
- * Club domestic league appearances and goals

Mark Wilson Gavin (born 10 December 1963) is a Scottish former professional footballer who played as a winger. He made over 290 Football League appearances in the 1980s and 1990s.

== Career ==
Mark Gavin played his youth football with Leeds United. Gavin signed professional for Leeds United in December 1981. While at Leeds United Gavin had a short loan spell with Hartlepool United in 1985. Gavin moved from Leeds United to Carlisle United in July 1985. Gavin joined Bolton Wanderers from Carlisle United in March 1986. Gavin played in the Associate Members' Cup final for Bolton Wanderers against Bristol City in May 1986. Gavin moved from Bolton Wanderers to Rochdale in August 1987. Gavin moved briefly to Scotland with Hearts and played in the Scottish League.

Bristol City manager Joe Jordan signed Gavin for £35,000 from Hearts in October 1988. Gavin moved from Bristol City to Watford when he was swapped with Wayne Allison in August 1990. Jimmy Lumsden brought Gavin back from Watford in December 1991 for £60,000 to Bristol City. Terry Cooper signed Gavin for Exeter City from Bristol City in February 1994. Gavin moved from Exeter City to Scunthorpe United in August 1996. Gavin rejoined Hartlepool United in July 1997 for a second spell. Gavin ended his playing career with a spell back in Scotland during 1997–98 with Greenock Morton.

== Honours ==
Bolton Wanderers

- Associate Members' Cup runner-up: 1985–86
