= Jason Eaton (footballer) =

English footballer (born 1969)

Jason Eaton (born 29 January 1969) is a former English footballer who most prominently played as a forward for Cheltenham Town.

Eaton was born in Bristol, England. At age 17, he signed for local side Bristol Rovers as a central forward. After playing one season at Rovers, manager Gerry Francis did not renew his contract. He then played for Clevedon and Trowbridge before he signed for Bristol City, who Eaton was a childhood fan of, and played for them for half a season.

In November 1990 he signed for semi-professional team Gloucester City for a fee of around £10,000. He played for Gloucester for just under two years before signing for rivals Cheltenham Town for £19,000. Eaton had his most successful spell at Cheltenham, winning the 1998 FA Trophy final with them, scoring a 79th minute header against Southport at Wembley Stadium.

After playing six seasons with Cheltenham, Eaton signed for Yeovil Town and played for a handful of local teams before once again joining Gloucester in 2004. At his last season at Gloucester, he only scored once before being released from the club.
