= Andy May (footballer, born 1964) =

English footballer (born 1964)

Personal information
- Full name: Andrew Michael Peter May
- Date of birth: 26 February 1964 (age 62)
- Place of birth: Bury, England
- Height: 5 ft 8 in (1.73 m)
- Position: Midfielder

Senior career*
Years	Team	Apps	(Gls)
1980–1987	Manchester City	150	(8)
1987–1990	Huddersfield Town	114	(5)
1987	→ Bolton Wanderers (loan)	10	(2)
1990–1992	Bristol City	90	(4)
1992–1995	Millwall	54	(1)
1995	→ Larne (loan)	10	(1)
	Welling United	1	(0)
Total		429	(21)

International career
1986	England U21	1	(0)
- * Club domestic league appearances and goals

Andrew Michael Peter May (born 26 February 1964) is an English former professional footballer who played in the Football League for Manchester City, Huddersfield Town, Bolton Wanderers, Bristol City and Millwall. In October 1995 he joined Larne of the Irish Football League for a loan spell, and he played once for Welling United in the 1995–96 Football Conference. He was capped once for England at under-21 level, in the semi-final of the 1986 European Championship.

After his playing career had ended he held coaching positions at Altrincham, Wigan Athletic, Stockport County and FC Halifax Town.

== Honours ==
Manchester City

- Full Members' Cup runner-up: 1985–86
