= Chris Honor =

English footballer

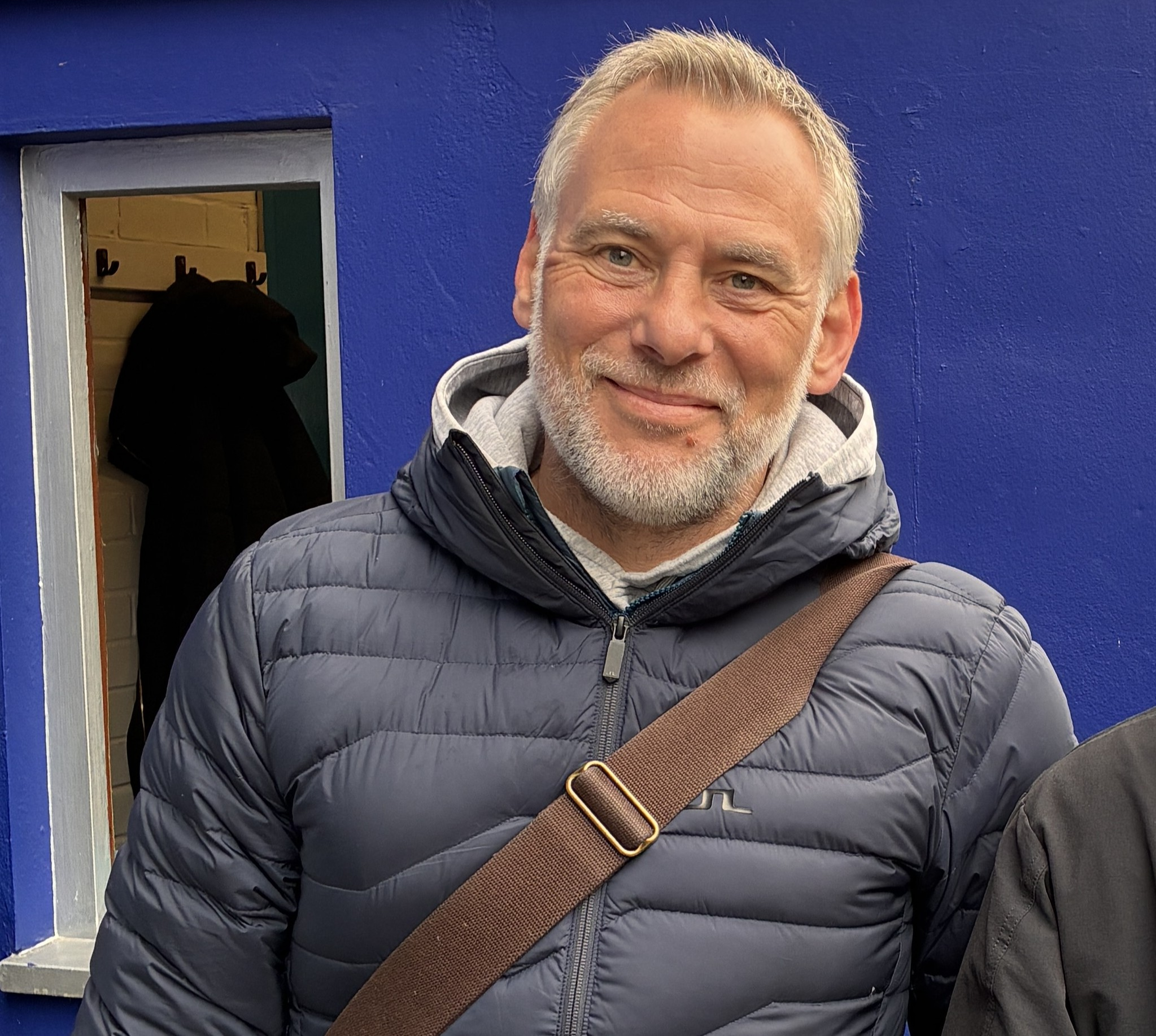
- Honor in 2026.

Personal information
- Full name: Christian Robert Honor
- Date of birth: 5 June 1968 (age 58)
- Place of birth: Bristol, England
- Position: Defender

Senior career*
| Years | Team | Apps | (Gls) |
| 1985–1991 | Bristol City | 60 | (1) |
| 1987 | → Torquay United (loan) | 3 | (0) |
| 1990 | → Hereford United (loan) | 3 | (0) |
| 1991 | → Swansea City (loan) | 2 | (0) |
| 1991–1995 | Airdrieonians | 94 | (5) |
| 1995 | → Cardiff City (loan) | 10 | (0) |
| 1995–1996 | Slough Town | | |
| 1996–1997 | Bath City | | |
| 1997–1998 | Partick Thistle | 2 | (0) |
- Forest Green Rovers
| Total | | 174 | (6) |
- * Club domestic league appearances and goals

Christian Robert Honor (born 5 June 1968) is an English footballer, who played in the Football League for Bristol City, Torquay United, Hereford United, Swansea City and Cardiff City, and in the Scottish Football League for Airdrieonians and Partick Thistle.

== Club career ==
Born in Bristol, England, Honor started his professional career at Bristol City, a team he grew up supporting as a boy. In 1991, Honor moved to Scotland to join Airdrieonians £20,000, where he became a first team regular. However, Honor found himself sidelined in his first season at the club. Despite being on the sidelines, he played for Airdrieonians in the 1992 Scottish Cup Final, which they lost 2–1 to Rangers.

At the start of the 1992–93 season, Honor became a first team regular for Airdrieonians. Honor scored his first goal for the club, in a 2–0 win against Falkirk. However, he scored an own-goal, in a 2–2 draw against Hibernian on 19 September 1992. He made his European debut against Sparta Prague in the first round of the European Cup Winners' Cup, losing 3–1 on aggregate. On 21 November 1992, Honor scored his second goal for Airdrieonians, in a 2–0 win against Hibernian. However, in a follow–up match against Dundee United, he suffered a foot injury and was substituted at half-time, in a 0–0 draw. After the match, Honor was out for three months. After returning from injury, he scored his third goal of the season, in a 2–2 draw against Partick Thistle on 9 March 1993.

Honor stayed at Airdrieonians for the 1993–94 season. On 31 July 1993, he scored his first goal of the season, coming from a penalty spot, in a 4–1 win against Dundee. On 30 October 1993, Honor scored from another penalty spot, in a 3–2 win against Hamilton Academical. On 4 December 1993, however, he received a red card for having an argument with a referee in a 4–0 win against Stirling Albion. After the match, Honor was given a five match suspension. Once Honor returned from suspension, he scored an equalising goal, in a 2–2 draw against Greenock Morton on 1 February 1994. However, Honor suffered another injury later in the 1993–94 season. At the end of the 1993–94 season, he left the club.

However, Honor found himself in a dispute with Airdrieonians over the Bosman ruling that saw him played part-time football in England. It was settled on 10 April 1996, with the club releasing him. He later criticised Airdrieonians for handling of his contract, resulting in him lost of earnings and the premature end of his career in top-level club football after taking his case to European Court of Justice. Honor also criticised George Peat and never forgiven him for ending his football career.

In September 1997, Honor returned to Scotland to join Partick Thistle, where he made two appearances for the club. But Honor left the club soon after, citing his difficulty to travel from his home at Bristol. He had a brief spell at Forest Green Rovers and Newport County.

In 2000, Honor signed for Basingstoke Town, only for him to suffer injuries throughout the 2000–01 season. Despite the injuries, he signed a new contract with the club to stay for another season. The 2001–02 season saw Honor win back his first team place for Basingstoke Town. However, in a match against Enfield on 1 September 2001, he received straight red card, in a 3–0 loss and served a three match suspension. On 10 November 2001, Honor scored from a free-kick, in a 3–3 draw against Harrow Borough. On 10 February 2002, he scored again from a free-kick, in a 2–2 draw against Purfleet. Honor continued to suffer from injuries as the 2001–02 season progressed. At the end of the 2001–02 season, he left the club to join Team Bath before retiring from professional football.

== Post-playing career ==
After his football career came to an end, Honor began coaching, where he assigned to roles at his former club, Bristol City, as well as, running his own property company. Honor also works with the media and advisory capacities, where at one point, he works as a pundit analysis for BBC Radio Bristol and Robins TV for Bristol City.

== Personal life ==
In 1994, Honor married his wife, Kirsty and together, they have one daughter.
