= Russell Osman =

English footballer (born 1959)

Personal information
- Full name: Russell Charles Osman
- Date of birth: 14 February 1959 (age 67)
- Place of birth: Repton, England
- Height: 6 ft 0 in (1.83 m)
- Position: Centre back

Youth career
- 1975–1976: Ipswich Town

Senior career*
Years	Team	Apps	(Gls)
1976–1985	Ipswich Town	294	(17)
1985–1988	Leicester City	108	(8)
1988–1991	Southampton	96	(6)
1991–1994	Bristol City	70	(3)
1995	Sudbury Town		
1995	Plymouth Argyle	0	(0)
1995–1996	Brighton & Hove Albion	12	(0)
1996	Cardiff City	15	(0)
Total		595	(34)

International career
1977	England Youth	3	(0)
1979–1980	England U21	7	(0)
1980	England B	2	(1)
1980–1983	England	11	(0)

Managerial career
- 1993–1994: Bristol City
- 1995: Plymouth Argyle (caretaker)
- 1996: Cardiff City
- 2004: Bristol Rovers (caretaker)
- * Club domestic league appearances and goals

Russell Charles Osman (born 14 February 1959) is an English former professional footballer who played as a centre back in the Football League for Ipswich Town, Leicester City, Southampton, Bristol City, Brighton & Hove Albion and Cardiff City. Osman played senior international football for England, for whom he received eleven caps. He is now a football pundit in the Indian Super League.

== Playing career ==
Osman was born in Repton, Derbyshire, the son of Rex Osman who played a handful of games for Derby County in the early 1950s. Osman played nearly 400 games for Ipswich Town, winning the 1980–81 UEFA Cup. Osman also contributed to Ipswich's victorious 1977–78 FA Cup campaign, making four appearances during the run. However he wasn't part of the squad for the final itself. Osman also represented his country 11 times. His first England cap came against Australia in a friendly on 31 May 1980, his last on 21 September 1983 in England's 1–0 Euro 84 qualifying match defeat to Denmark.

== Managerial career ==
Later in his playing career he was player-manager of Bristol City, famously guiding the club to a 1-0 victory against Liverpool at Anfield in an F.A. Cup replay in 1994, and had a brief spell as caretaker manager of Plymouth Argyle before later managing Cardiff City. He had a brief role as joint caretaker manager of Bristol Rovers in 2004. In November 2007, he was appointed as assistant manager to Paul Tisdale at Exeter City. In February 2011 he was appointed coach of the Ipswich Town Under 18s. He left the role in August 2013. In July 2015 Osman joined Newport County as assistant manager to Terry Butcher. Butcher, Osman and Steve Marsalla were sacked on 1 October 2015 with Newport bottom of League Two after gaining just 5 points from the first 10 matches of the 2015–16 season.

== Escape to Victory ==
He played Doug Clure, one of the prisoner-of-war footballers, in the 1981 film Escape to Victory, which also included American actor Sylvester Stallone, British actor Michael Caine, Swedish actor Max von Sydow, and football stars Pelé, Ossie Ardiles, and Kazimierz Deyna. The film was based on a game between an Allied team and a Nazi German team during the Second World War.

== Career statistics ==
Appearances and goals by club, season and competition
Club	Season	League			FA Cup		League Cup		Europe		Other		Total	
Club	Season	Division	Apps	Goals	Apps	Goals	Apps	Goals	Apps	Goals	Apps	Goals	Apps	Goals
Ipswich Town
Ipswich Town	1977–78	First Division	28	0	4	0	2	0	4 (Note: Appearances in Europa League)	0	—		38	0
Ipswich Town	1978–79	First Division	39	2	5	0	1	0	6 (Note: Appearances in Cup Winners' Cup)	0	1 (Note: Appearances in Charity Shield)	0	52	2
Ipswich Town	1979–80	First Division	42	2	4	0	2	0	4	0	—		52	2
Ipswich Town	1980–81	First Division	42	1	7	0	5	2	12	0	—		66	3
Ipswich Town	1981–82	First Division	39	2	3	0	7	0	2	0	—		51	2
Ipswich Town	1982–83	First Division	38	4	3	1	2	0	2	0	—		45	5
Ipswich Town	1983–84	First Division	37	3	2	0	3	0	—		—		42	3
Ipswich Town	1984–85	First Division	29	3	4	0	6	1	—		—		39	4
Ipswich Town	Total		294	17	32	1	28	3	30	0	1	0	385	21
Leicester City
Leicester City	1985–86	First Division	40	0	1	0	1	0	—		—		42	0
Leicester City	1986–87	First Division	31	3	0	0	3	0	—		—		34	3
Leicester City	1987–88	Second Division	37	5	1	0	4	0	—		2 (Note: Appearances in Full Members' Cup)	0	44	5
Leicester City	Total		108	8	2	0	8	0	0	0	2	0	120	8
Southampton
Southampton	1988–89	First Division	36	0	1	0	6	0	—		2	0	45	0
Southampton	1989–90	First Division	35	5	3	0	7	0	—		—		45	5
Southampton	1990–91	First Division	20	1	3	0	5	0	—		1	0	29	1
Southampton	1991–92	First Division	5	0	0	0	0	0	—		—		5	0
Southampton	Total		96	6	7	0	18	0	0	0	3	0	124	6
Bristol City
Bristol City	1991–92	Second Division	31	2	4	0	0	0	—		—		35	2
Bristol City	1992–93	First Division	34	0	1	0	1	0	2 (Note: Appearances in Anglo-Italian Cup)	0	—		38	0
Bristol City	1993–94	First Division	5	1	0	0	2	0	1	0	—		8	1
Bristol City	Total		70	3	5	0	3	0	3	0	0	0	81	3
Brighton & Hove Albion	1995–96	Second Division	12	0	2	0	0	0	—		3 (Note: Appearances in EFL Trophy)	0	17	0
Cardiff City	1995–96	Third Division	15	0	0	0	0	0	—		—		15	0
Career total			595	34	48	1	57	3	33	0	9	0	742	38

== Honours ==
Ipswich Town

- UEFA Cup: 1981

Individual

- Football League First Division PFA Team of the Year: 1980–81
- Ipswich Town Hall of Fame: Inducted 2011
