= Rob Newman (footballer) =

English footballer & manager

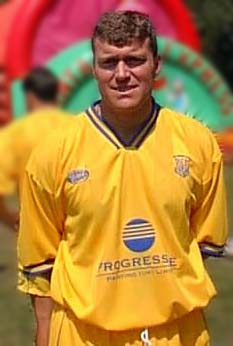

Personal information
- Full name: Robert Nigel Newman
- Date of birth: 13 December 1963 (age 62)
- Place of birth: Bradford-on-Avon, England
- Height: 6 ft 2 in (1.88 m)
- Position: Defender

Senior career*
Years	Team	Apps	(Gls)
1981–1991	Bristol City	394	(52)
1991–1998	Norwich City	205	(14)
1997–1998	→ Motherwell (loan)	11	(0)
1998	→ Wigan Athletic (loan)	8	(0)
1998–2002	Southend United	72	(11)
2003	Chelmsford City	1	(0)
- Gorleston
2007–2008	AFC Bournemouth	0	(0)
Total		691	(77)

Managerial career
- 2001–2003: Southend United
- 2004: Gorleston (caretaker)
- 2005–2006: Cambridge United
- 2006–2008: AFC Bournemouth (assistant)
- * Club domestic league appearances and goals

Robert Nigel Newman (born 13 December 1963) is an English football manager and former professional footballer, who was most recently head of recruitment at Premier League side West Ham United.

As a player, he was a defender, notably playing in the Premier League for Norwich City, where he also featured in the UEFA Cup. He also played in the Scottish Premier League for Motherwell, in the Football League with Bristol City, Wigan Athletic and Southend United and for non-league sides Chelmsford City and Gorleston.

Following retirement, Newman had spells in charge of Southend United, Gorleston and Cambridge United. He later became a first team coach at AFC Bournemouth and briefly registered as a player to add cover. He has since worked in a recruitment role, firstly for Manchester City and with West Ham United.

== Playing career ==
Newman signed for Bristol City as an apprentice in October 1981, later serving as club captain and eventually playing 483 games for the club, leaving him seventh on Bristol City's all-time appearances chart.

After three consecutive relegations Bristol City were in financial turmoil in 1982. Eight of the club's top-earning players – known as the 'Ashton Gate Eight' – saved the club by ripping up their contracts and taking redundancy. On 6 February 1982 Bristol City played Fulham at Ashton Gate in the first match following the departure of the eight senior players. The team was populated with several young reserve team players, including an 18-year-old Newman.

Having been with the club at this low point, Newman was a key figure in improving the club's fortunes. Playing predominantly in central midfield and defence, he helped the club win promotion to Division 3 in 1984, win the Associate Members' Cup in 1986 and achieve a further promotion, to Division 2, in 1990.

After a decade at Ashton Gate, Newman was sold to Norwich City for £600,000 in the summer of 1991. He was a member of the Norwich team that finished a club record third in the FA Premier League in 1992–93 and went on to play a part in the defeat of Bayern Munich in the following season's UEFA Cup. He had also helped them reach the semi-finals of the FA Cup in his first season at Carrow Road.

During his time with Norwich, Newman was initially used in 1991–92 as a central midfielder, where he managed to score several important goals. He even deputised as a forward covering for injuries. He was ultimately primarily played in central defence in the majority of games for Norwich, particularly later on in his career.

During a dead ball competition at Wembley in 1994, it was found that Newman had the hardest shot in the league at the time.

He stayed at Norwich until the end of the 1997–98, when new manager Bruce Rioch decided not to renew his contract. He then signed for Southend United, and later worked on the coaching staff at Roots Hall, as well as having a spell as assistant manager.

Towards the end of the 2002–03 season, Newman signed as cover for Chelmsford City. In July 2003, Newman signed for Gorleston. In October 2004, Newman was appointed caretaker manager of Gorleston.

== Coaching career ==
After his playing days, Newman became a manager in the lower leagues of English football. He had a short time spell at Southend United before being appointed assistant manager to Steve Thompson at Cambridge United in December 2004. Following Thompson's departure from an unsuccessful spell which led to Cambridge's relegation from the Football League, Newman was appointed manager in May 2005. He gained the support of Cambridge fans, earning him the nickname of 'Buzz Lightyear', owing to his facial likeness to the character from the motion-picture Toy Story. Some fans even set up a fan site (see below), and wore Buzz Lightyear masks in homage to him. However, he was sacked following United's 3–1 defeat by Exeter City on 1 September 2006 that left the club second-bottom of the Conference.

The following month, the new AFC Bournemouth manager Kevin Bond appointed Newman as his assistant. Newman also played for the Bournemouth reserves team. Occasionally, he was included in Bournemouth first team, being named a sub in the match against Carlisle after the team had only 14 fit first team players. He made his Bournemouth début away to Bristol Rovers in a Football League Trophy South Section Area Second Round match, appearing as a substitute. Bournemouth went on to win the match 1–0. Newman was sacked along with Kevin Bond and Eddie Howe in September 2008.

Newman was head of recruitment at West Ham United, leaving in May 2024 following the departure of manager, David Moyes.

== Honours ==
Bristol City

- Associate Members' Cup: 1985–86; runner-up: 1986–87

Individual

- PFA Team of the Year: 1988–89 Third Division, 1989–90 Third Division
