= Gary Shelton =

English footballer (born 1958)

Personal information
- Date of birth: 21 March 1958 (age 68)
- Place of birth: Nottingham, England
- Height: 5 ft 7 in (1.70 m)
- Position: Midfielder

Youth career
- 1974–1976: Walsall

Senior career*
Years	Team	Apps	(Gls)
1976–1978	Walsall	24	(0)
1978–1982	Aston Villa	24	(7)
1980	→ Notts County (loan)	8	(0)
1982–1987	Sheffield Wednesday	198	(18)
1987–1989	Oxford United	65	(1)
1989–1994	Bristol City	150	(24)
1994	→ Rochdale (loan)	3	(0)
1994–2000	Chester City	69	(6)

International career
1984	England U21	1	(0)

Managerial career
- 1992: Bristol City (caretaker manager)
- * Club domestic league appearances and goals

Gary Shelton (born 21 March 1958) is an English former professional footballer who played as a midfielder.

== Playing career ==
Shelton came through the ranks at Walsall to become a first-team player, catching the eye of neighbours Aston Villa. He made an £80,000 switch to Villa Park in January 1978 but was to struggle to establish himself at the club. He made no appearances in the 1980–81 championship success and enjoyed just one more league outing before a £50,000 switch to Sheffield Wednesday in March 1982.

Shelton spent five years at Hillsborough, helping the club win promotion to the top-flight in 1984 and reach the FA Cup semi-finals two years later. In July 1987 Shelton moved to Oxford United for £150,000, but he was unable to prevent their relegation out of Division One and League Cup semi-final loss to Luton Town.

Shelton was transferred again in August 1989, when he joined Third Division side Bristol City in a swap deal with future England manager Steve McClaren. His first season ended in promotion and Shelton was to enjoy a brief spell in joint caretaker charge of the club with Mark Aizlewood and Russell Osman in 1992.

Shelton started more than 40 league games in three of his five seasons at Ashton Gate but appeared just three times in 1993–94 when he spent time on loan with Rochdale. In July 1994 Shelton joined Division Two side Chester City, where he was to remain for six years. He was appointed assistant manager to Kevin Ratcliffe in 1995 but continued to play for the club as he approached his late 30s. His final league appearance for the club was a month before his 40th birthday on 14 February 1998, in a goalless draw at Hartlepool United. He remained registered as a player but was not involved on the playing side again. Shelton left his role with Chester in June 2000 shortly after they were relegated out of The Football League and he took up a coaching role with West Bromwich Albion that he held for several years.

Gary's eldest son, Andy Shelton, played for Chester while Gary was on the coaching staff. Gary's youngest son, Gary Shelton, also played for Bristol Rovers and Chester youth teams before having brief spells at both Altrincham Town and Vauxhall Motors.

== Honours ==
Sheffield Wednesday

- Football League Division Two runners-up: 1983–84.

Bristol City

- Football League Division Three runners-up: 1989–90.
