= David Rennie (footballer) =

Scottish footballer

Personal information
- Full name: David Rennie
- Date of birth: 29 August 1964 (age 62)
- Place of birth: Edinburgh, Scotland
- Height: 6 ft 0 in (1.83 m)
- Positions: Defender; midfielder

Youth career
- 1980–1982: Leicester City

Senior career*
Years	Team	Apps	(Gls)
1982–1986	Leicester City	21	(1)
1986–1989	Leeds United	101	(5)
1989–1992	Bristol City	104	(8)
1992–1993	Birmingham City	35	(4)
1993–1996	Coventry City	82	(3)
1996–1997	Northampton Town	44	(3)
1997–1999	Peterborough United	27	(0)
1999–2000	Boston United	43	(5)
2000–2002	Burton Albion		
Medal record
Scotland
UEFA European U-18 Championship
Winner	1982 Finland	Team competition
- * Club domestic league appearances and goals

David Rennie (born 29 August 1964) is a Scottish former professional footballer who played as a defender or defensive midfielder, notably for Leeds United, Bristol City and in the Premier League for Coventry City.

== Playing career ==
He made more than 400 appearances in the Football League, playing for Leicester City, Leeds United, Bristol City, Birmingham City, Coventry City, Northampton Town and Peterborough United.

== Personal life ==
Since retiring, Rennie has worked for a company supplying employment law and health and safety services.

== Honours ==
Northampton Town

- Football League Third Division play-offs: 1997
