= Dave Smith (footballer, born 1961) =

English footballer

Personal information
- Full name: David Alan Smith
- Date of birth: 25 June 1961 (age 65)
- Place of birth: Sidcup, England
- Position: Winger

Youth career
- ?: Charlton Athletic

Senior career*
Years	Team	Apps	(Gls)
?–1981	Orpington Eagles		
1981–?	Welling United		
?–1984	Dartford		
1984–1986	Welling United		
1986–1989	Gillingham	104	(10)
1989–1991	Bristol City	97	(10)
1991–1992	Plymouth	18	(2)
1992–1993	Notts County	37	(8)
?	Welling United		
- * Club domestic league appearances and goals

David Alan Smith (born 25 June 1961) is an English former professional footballer. His clubs included Gillingham, where he made over 100 Football League appearances, Bristol City, Plymouth Argyle and Notts County.
