= Jimmy Lumsden =

Scottish footballer and manager

Personal information
- Full name: James Murdoch Lumsden
- Date of birth: 7 November 1947 (age 79)
- Place of birth: Glasgow, Scotland
- Height: 5 ft 5 in (1.65 m)
- Position: Midfielder

Senior career*
Years	Team	Apps	(Gls)
1966–1970	Leeds United	4	(0)
1970–1971	Southend United	13	(0)
1971–1973	Morton	42	(3)
1973	St Mirren	13	(1)
1973–1974	Cork Hibernians	?	(3)
1974–1975	Morton	28	(2)
1975–1978	Clydebank	76	(3)
Total		176+	(12)

Managerial career
- 1990–1992: Bristol City
- * Club domestic league appearances and goals

James Murdoch Lumsden (born 7 November 1947 in Glasgow), known as Wee Jimmy, is a Scottish former association football player and former first team coach at Everton and Manchester United.

== Playing career ==
He began his footballing career with Leeds United in 1964, he captained Leeds reserves however failed to make a lasting breakthrough into the first team, playing just four games before his transfer to Southend United in 1970. Over the next eight years he had spells with Greenock Morton, St Mirren, Cork Hibernians, Clydebank.

Having spent six years at Leeds United as a player in the 1960s, Lumsden returned to Elland Road as Assistant Manager to Eddie Gray between in the late 80s whilst the club languished in the middle reaches of the old Second Division.

== Managerial career ==
Lumsden began his coaching career as Eddie Gray's assistant at Leeds, but was fired along with Gray in September 1985. After leaving Leeds he went to work in a Boarding School in Wetherby where he stayed for the next few years. He subsequently enjoyed management roles at both Bristol City and Rochdale before going back to the dressing room as First Team Coach at Preston, then in the Second Division, under the stewardship of David Moyes.

=== Preston North End ===
When Gary Peters quit the club in February 1998, Moyes (a 34-year-old defender) replaced him. With the help of Moyes, Lumsden and Bob Carter, Preston quickly became promotion contenders, reaching the 1998-99 playoffs (losing to Gillingham in the semi-finals before finally being promoted as champions a year later) They almost made it two promotions a row in 2001, but lost 3-0 to Bolton in the Division One final. Lumsden - a superstitious man - has never worn the same socks since.

=== Everton ===
Following this Moyes took his trusted Coach over to Goodison Park when he succeeded Walter Smith as Everton boss.

Jimmy joined Everton FC in the summer of 2002 as Head Coach, assisting David Moyes and Alan Irvine.

On 1 July 2013, Everton FC confirmed that Jimmy Lumsden, along with Steve Round and Chris Woods had been released from their coaching contracts and would join David Moyes at Manchester United.

=== Manchester United ===
On 1 July, Manchester United announced that Lumsden, as well as former Everton assistant coach Steve Round and goalkeeping coach Chris Woods would be following the incoming David Moyes to the club.

David Moyes said: "I have worked with Steve, Chris and Jimmy for a number of years and I am delighted they have decided to join me at this great club. They bring great qualities in their respective fields and I know that, like me, they feel that this is a challenge to relish. I have great faith that together, we can build upon the success this club has enjoyed over many years."

With the dismissal of David Moyes as Manchester United manager on 22 April 2014, Lumsden also parted company with the club along with assistant manager, Steve Round.

Lumsden was briefly linked with the vacant Southampton job in 2014 but insisted he was too busy with his allotment.
