= Rob Edwards (footballer, born 1973) =

Wales international footballer & coach

Personal information
- Full name: Robert William Edwards
- Date of birth: 1 January 1973 (age 53)
- Place of birth: Kendal, England
- Position: Defender

Team information
- Current team: Cheltenham Town (first-team coach)

Youth career
- Carlisle United

Senior career*
Years	Team	Apps	(Gls)
1990–1991	Carlisle United	48	(5)
1991–1999	Bristol City	218	(5)
1999–2004	Preston North End	169	(4)
2004–2006	Blackpool	58	(1)
2006–2011	Exeter City	160	(2)
Total		445	(17)

International career^{‡}
	Wales U21	17	(?)
	Wales B	2	(?)
1997–1998	Wales	4	(0)

Managerial career
- 2014: Tranmere Rovers
- Wales U17
- 2019–2024: Wales U19
- * Club domestic league appearances and goals as of 10:37, 13 November 2010 (UTC) ‡ National team caps and goals as of 12:29, 19 February 2010 (UTC)

Robert William Edwards (born 1 January 1973 in Kendal, Westmorland) is a professional football manager and former player. He is currently a first-team coach at Cheltenham Town. He played for Football League One side Exeter City before retiring in May 2011, and is a Welsh international, being capped on four occasions. In May 2014, he was appointed the manager of Tranmere Rovers. He was sacked from the post in October 2014. In August 2019 Edwards was promoted from Wales Under 17 coach to Wales Under 19 team coach

== Playing career ==
Edwards, a defender, started his career as a trainee with Carlisle, playing in 56 first-team games with the club. On 27 March 1991, Robert completed a £135,000 move to then Division Two side Bristol City.

In over eight seasons at Ashton Gate, Edwards made 266 appearances and earned his first cap for Wales. On 8 August 1999 Edwards moved on a free to then League One side Preston North End, where he played an important role in Preston's title victory, and promotion to the second tier. On 1 July 2004, Edwards moved to League One side Blackpool where he made 69 appearances before being released on a free at the end of the 2005–06 season by manager Simon Grayson. He scored once during his spell at Blackpool, in a 2–1 defeat to Sheffield Wednesday in August 2004.

After playing on trial with his first club Carlisle and also League Two side Rochdale, Edwards was snapped up by Conference National side Exeter City. After signing for the Grecians in 2006, he established himself as a first team regular in the heart of the defence for Exeter City and in December 2007, City manager Paul Tisdale appointed Rob as player-coach at Exeter: coaching the reserves, while still being a member of the first team. He was the only member of the squad to start in all 46 matches of Exeter's 2007–08 campaign. That season culminated in Edwards scoring the winning goal at Wembley on 18 May 2008 in Exeter's 2008 Conference Premier play-off final win over Cambridge United securing the club's return to the Football League.

He retired from professional football in May 2011.

== Managerial career ==
After retiring, Edwards worked as first team coach for Exeter City. On 13 May 2014 Edwards quit as assistant manager of Exeter City. On 27 May 2014, he was appointed as the new manager of Tranmere Rovers. Edwards was sacked from his job as manager on 13 October 2014.

In February 2015 Edwards, who the previous December had been appointed as assistant to Paul Buckle at Cheltenham Town, left the club (along with Buckle) by mutual consent.

In August 2019 Edwards was promoted from Wales Under 17 coach to Wales Under 19 team coach.

In June 2024, Edwards joined National League side Forest Green Rovers as first-team coach.

== Managerial statistics ==
As of 13 October 2014

Managerial record by team and tenure
Team	From	To	Record					Ref
Team	From	To	P	W	D	L	Win %	Ref
Tranmere Rovers	27 May 2014	13 October 2014	14	2	4	8	14.3	
Total			14	2	4	8	14.3	—

== Honours ==
Preston North End

- Football League Second Division: 1999–2000
