= Nicky Morgan (footballer) =

English footballer

Personal information
- Full name: Nicholas Morgan
- Date of birth: 30 October 1959 (age 67)
- Place of birth: East Ham, England
- Height: 5 ft 10 in (1.78 m)
- Position: Forward

Youth career
- 1976–1978: West Ham United

Senior career*
Years	Team	Apps	(Gls)
1978–1983	West Ham United	21	(2)
1981–1982	→ FC Den Haag (loan)	20	(6)
1983–1986	Portsmouth	95	(32)
1986–1990	Stoke City	88	(21)
1990–1993	Bristol City	80	(23)
1992	→ AFC Bournemouth (loan)	6	(1)
1993–1994	Exeter City	12	(4)
1994	Salisbury City		(1)
Total		322	(90)
- * Club domestic league appearances and goals

Nicholas Morgan (born 30 October 1959) is an English former footballer who played in the Football League for AFC Bournemouth, Bristol City, Exeter City, Portsmouth, Stoke City and West Ham United.

Morgan began his career with his local side West Ham United where he made fleeting appearances and also had time on loan at Dutch side FC Den Haag. With chances limited at West Ham, Morgan joined Portsmouth where he enjoyed to most success in his career. He spent five seasons at Fratton Park where he made 109 appearances scoring 35 goals. He joined Stoke City where he scored 26 goals in 104 games in four seasons before playing for Bristol City for four years. After scoring 29 goals in 89 games for the "Robins" he played for AFC Bournemouth and then Exeter City and retired in 1994.

== Career ==
Morgan was born in East Ham and started his career at his boyhood club West Ham United as an apprentice before earning a professional contract in 1978. He failed to make much of an impression at the "Hammers" and joined Portsmouth in 1983. Prior to joining Portsmouth Morgan had spent the 1981–82 season at Dutch club FC Den Haag where he played 20 times scoring six goals but they finished in 17th position and were relegated.

He did much better at "Pompey" and in his first season with the club they gained promotion to the Second Division. In the next four seasons Portsmouth tried to gain a promotion to the First Division finishing fourth twice with Morgan scoring 16 goals in 1985–86. They claimed that promotion they wanted in 1986–87 but Morgan left for Stoke City just four matches into the season. He made a fine start to his Stoke career scoring on his debut against Hull City on 8 November 1986. He finished the 1986–87 season with 12 goals to his name. He then hit six in the following two seasons and with Stoke enduring a terrible 1989–90 season and on their way to being relegated to the Third Division, Morgan left for Bristol City in April 1989.

It proved to be a good decision by Morgan as he scored four goals in seven matches as Bristol City and Stoke City swapped league places at the end of the season. He scored 17 goals in 1990–91 as Bristol City finished in 9th position. He fell out of the first team picture in 1991–92 and 1992–93 and spent a short spell on loan at Bournemouth. He left Bristol City in August 1993 for Exeter City, where he played 12 matches scoring four goals before deciding to retire from the game after a brief spell at Salisbury City.

== Career statistics ==
Club	Season	League			FA Cup		League Cup		Other^{[A]}		Total	
Club	Season	Division	Apps	Goals	Apps	Goals	Apps	Goals	Apps	Goals	Apps	Goals
West Ham United	1978–79	Second Division	2	0	0	0	0	0	0	0	2	0
West Ham United	1979–80	Second Division	6	1	0	0	1	0	0	0	6	1
West Ham United	1980–81	Second Division	6	1	0	0	0	0	4	0	10	1
West Ham United	1981–82	First Division	0	0	0	0	0	0	0	0	0	0
West Ham United	1982–83	First Division	7	0	0	0	0	0	0	0	7	0
West Ham United	Total		21	2	0	0	1	0	4	0	26	2
FC Den Haag (loan)	1981–82	Eredivise	20	6	0	0	0	0	0	0	20	6
Portsmouth	1982–83	Third Division	6	1	0	0	0	0	0	0	6	1
Portsmouth	1983–84	Second Division	25	9	1	1	2	0	0	0	28	10
Portsmouth	1984–85	Second Division	30	8	1	0	2	0	0	0	33	8
Portsmouth	1985–86	Second Division	30	14	1	0	5	1	2	1	38	16
Portsmouth	1986–87	Second Division	4	0	0	0	0	0	0	0	4	0
Portsmouth	Total		95	32	3	1	9	1	2	1	109	35
Stoke City	1986–87	Second Division	29	10	5	2	0	0	0	0	34	12
Stoke City	1987–88	Second Division	28	5	2	0	3	1	3	0	36	6
Stoke City	1988–89	Second Division	18	5	0	0	1	1	0	0	19	6
Stoke City	1989–90	Second Division	13	1	0	0	1	1	1	0	15	2
Stoke City	Total		88	21	6	2	5	3	4	0	104	26
Bristol City	1989–90	Third Division	7	4	0	0	0	0	0	0	7	4
Bristol City	1990–91	Second Division	44	13	0	0	4	4	0	0	48	17
Bristol City	1991–92	Second Division	19	3	2	0	2	2	0	0	21	5
Bristol City	1992–93	First Division	10	3	0	0	0	0	0	0	10	3
Bristol City	1993–94	First Division	0	0	0	0	0	0	1	0	1	0
Bristol City	Total		80	23	2	0	6	6	1	0	89	29
Bournemouth (loan)	1992–93	Second Division	6	1	2	1	0	0	1	1	9	3
Exeter City	1993–94	Second Division	12	4	0	0	0	0	0	0	12	4
Career Total			322	89	14	4	21	10	12	2	369	105

A. The "Other" column constitutes appearances and goals in the Anglo-Italian Cup, UEFA Cup Winners' Cup, FA Community Shield, Full Members' Cup, Football League Trophy.
