= Andy Llewellyn =

English footballer

Personal information
- Full name: Andrew David Llewellyn
- Date of birth: 26 February 1966 (age 60)
- Place of birth: Bristol, England
- Height: 5 ft 7 in (1.70 m)
- Position: Right back

Youth career
- Bristol City

Senior career*
Years	Team	Apps	(Gls)
1982–1994	Bristol City	308	(3)
1994	→ Exeter City (loan)	15	(0)
1994–1995	Hereford United	4	(0)
1995	Yeovil Town	13	(0)
Total		340	(3)

International career
1983	England Youth	5	(0)
1985	England U19	1	(0)

Managerial career
- 2023–2024: Bridgwater United
- * Club domestic league appearances and goals

Andrew David Llewellyn (born 26 February 1966) is an English former professional footballer who made more than 300 appearances in the Football League and represented England at youth level. He played as a right back.

== Career ==
Born in Bristol, Llewellyn played for Bristol City, Exeter City, Hereford United and Yeovil Town.

In November 2023, Llewellyn was appointed manager of Western Football League Premier Division side Bridgwater United. In June 2024, he stepped down from his role due to work commitments. In September 2024, he returned to the club as Director of Football.

== Honours ==
Bristol City

- Associate Members' Cup runner-up: 1986–87
