= Matt Bryant (footballer) =

English footballer (born 1970)

Personal information
- Full name: Matthew Bryant
- Date of birth: 21 September 1970 (age 56)
- Place of birth: Bristol, England
- Height: 6 ft 1 in (1.85 m)
- Position: Defender

Senior career*
Years	Team	Apps	(Gls)
1989–1996	Bristol City	203	(7)
1989–1990	→ Gloucester City (loan)	7	(0)
1990	→ Walsall (loan)	13	(0)
1996–1999	Gillingham	103	(0)
- * Club domestic league appearances and goals

Matthew Bryant (born 21 September 1970) is an English former professional footballer who played as a midfielder in the Football League in the 1990s.

Born in Bristol, he started his career with Bristol City in 1990-91, and after a short loan spell with Walsall went on to make over 200 appearances for Bristol City, scoring 7 goals for them in all competitions.

In August 1990, during his loan spell at Walsall, he had the misfortune of scoring an own goal which was the first ever league goal scored at the Bescot Stadium.

Bryant moved to Gillingham for the 1996-97 season, making over 100 appearances for them before retiring due to injury.
