= Mark Shail =

English footballer

Personal information
- Date of birth: 15 October 1966 (age 60)
- Place of birth: Sandviken, Sweden
- Height: 1.85 m (6 ft 1 in)
- Position: Defender

Youth career
- Worcester City

Senior career*
Years	Team	Apps	(Gls)
1987	Hamilton Steelers	4	
1987-1988	Winnipeg Fury	33	(4)
1988–1993	Yeovil Town	208	(9)
1993–2000	Bristol City	129	(4)
2000–2002	Kidderminster Harriers	40	(1)
2002–2003	Worcester City		
- * Club domestic league appearances and goals

Mark Shail (born 15 October 1966) is a former footballer who played in The Football League for Bristol City and Kidderminster Harriers.

== Career ==
Shail played two seasons in the Canadian Soccer League, first at Hamilton Steelers before he joined Winnipeg Fury in 1987. He then moved to Worcester City before he earned a transfer to Yeovil Town and then on to Bristol City where he became first team Captain. He joined Kidderminster Harriers in 2000 before ending his career with his first club Worcester. Since retiring from football he has worked as a journalist for the Professional Footballers' Association.
