= Martin Scott (English footballer) =

English footballer and manager

Personal information
- Full name: Martin Scott
- Date of birth: 7 January 1968 (age 58)
- Place of birth: Sheffield, Yorkshire, England
- Height: 5 ft 8 in (1.73 m)
- Position: Left-back

Senior career*
Years	Team	Apps	(Gls)
1986–1990	Rotherham United	94	(3)
1988	→ Nottingham Forest (loan)	0	(0)
1990–1994	Bristol City	171	(14)
1994–1999	Sunderland	106	(9)
Total		371	(26)

Managerial career
- 2003–2005: Hartlepool United (assistant)
- 2005–2006: Hartlepool United
- 2006–2007: Bury (assistant)
- 2012–2013: Barnsley (assistant)
- 2016–2022: South Shields (assistant)
- * Club domestic league appearances and goals

Martin Scott (born 7 January 1968) is an English former football player and coach. Scott made over 350 Football League appearances as a left back during the 1980s and 1990s.

== Playing career ==
Scott had a distinguished playing career at Rotherham United, Nottingham Forest, Bristol City and Sunderland before injury forced him to retire from playing.

== Coaching career ==
=== Hartlepool United ===
He went on to become youth team manager at Hartlepool United. He led the team to the fifth round of the FA Youth Cup, losing to Manchester United. Later, he had an eight-month spell as manager of the first team, he left the club after an alarming slide down the table, his side would be eventually relegated. After leaving Pools, he had a brief spell as assistant manager at League Two side Bury before leaving to take up a role at Middlesbrough.

=== Middlesbrough ===
Scott joined Middlesbrough as an under-18 coach in July 2007, before being promoted to reserve team coach a year later.

Scott had his contract terminated on 3 May 2010, along with goalkeeping coach Stephen Pears and first team coach Colin Cooper.

=== Barnsley ===
When Barnsley sacked manager Keith Hill on 29 December 2012, following a defeat by Blackburn Rovers, Scott was asked to help out caretaker manager David Flitcroft. The arrangement came about after Scott texted to his friend to express his condolences over the managerial dismissal. Former Fleetwood Town manager Micky Mellon also came in to help Flitcroft in similar circumstances.

On 13 January 2013, the day after Barnsley won 2–0 at home to Leeds United, Flitcroft was named permanent manager with Mellon as his assistant and Scott as first-team coach. On 30 November 2013, Scott left Barnsley following the departure of Flitcroft.

=== South Shields ===
In October 2016, Scott was appointed assistant manager at South Shields alongside Graham Fenton. He took up this role alongside his full-time job as director of his own football academy. At Shields, the pair won promotion to the Northern Premier League and won the FA Vase in 2017. However, he left the club following Fenton's controversial sacking in January 2022.

== Personal life ==
Scott's son Olly is also a footballer who plays for King's Lynn Town.

== Managerial statistics ==
Managerial record by team and tenure
Team	From	To	Record					Ref.
Team	From	To	P	W	D	L	Win %	Ref.
Hartlepool United	4 May 2005	1 February 2006	39	11	10	18	28.2	

== Honours ==
Rotherham United

- Football League Fourth Division: 1988–89

Sunderland

- Football League First Division: 1995–96, 1998–99
