= Wayne Allison =

English footballer and coach

Personal information
- Full name: Wayne Anthony Allison
- Date of birth: 16 October 1968 (age 58)
- Place of birth: Huddersfield, England
- Height: 6 ft 1 in (1.85 m)
- Position: Striker

Senior career*
Years	Team	Apps	(Gls)
1987–1989	Halifax Town	84	(23)
1989–1990	Watford	7	(0)
1990–1995	Bristol City	195	(48)
1995–1997	Swindon Town	101	(31)
1997–1999	Huddersfield Town	74	(15)
1999–2002	Tranmere Rovers	103	(26)
2002–2004	Sheffield United	73	(7)
2004–2008	Chesterfield	115	(21)
2008	Chester City	0	(0)
Total		752	(171)

Managerial career
- 2008: Chester City (caretaker)
- 2017: Cardiff Metropolitan University
- * Club domestic league appearances and goals

Dr. Wayne Anthony Allison (born 16 October 1968) is an English former footballer and coach. In a career spanning over 20 years, he played for eight clubs and scored more than 200 goals. He played as a centre forward and was nicknamed the "Chief".

== Playing career ==
Born in Huddersfield, Allison joined Halifax Town as a trainee in August 1986, breaking into the first-team before signing a professional contract in July 1987. In two seasons with Halifax he scored 23 league goals in 84 games.

Allison joined Watford for £250,000 in July 1989, one of three players signed by Steve Harrison from Halifax during his tenure. At Watford he made only seven appearances, scoring no goals. In July 1990 Watford signed Mark Gavin from Bristol City for a fee for £250,000 and Allison, who was valued at £150,000, went to City in exchange. He was more successful in Bristol, netting 57 goals in 225 games over a five-year spell at the club.

Swindon Town manager Steve McMahon signed Allison in 1995 for a fee set by tribunal of £475,000. A roaming player for the club, Allison's ability to hold the ball up whilst others advanced in support and also help in defence earned him inclusion in Swindon Town Football Club 100 Greats. He left Swindon for Huddersfield Town, his home town team, for the highest transfer fee of his career, £800,000. However he moved again in September 1999 to Tranmere Rovers for £300,000. He was cup-tied for their run to the 2000 Football League Cup Final. During his three-year stay at Tranmere he netted 32 goals in 117 appearances.

In July 2002 Allison moved on a free transfer to Sheffield United. Although he had been offered a better deal at Third Division side Boston, he opted for the challenge of gaining promotion for the First Division club. He was a regular in a side that reached both domestic cup semi finals in the 2002–03 season. He started in both the FA Cup semi final against Arsenal and in both legs of the League Cup against Liverpool. He made the last transfer of his career to Chesterfield on 25 June 2004 on a free transfer.

== Coaching and management ==
On 25 February 2008, Allison left Chesterfield due to limited playing options as well as lack of support from the board for his application as assistant manager. After completing both his UEFA 'A' and 'B' licences Allison also passed his Certificate of Applied Management in the summer of 2008 before starting the first year of his pro licence in June.

In August 2008, Allison began helping manager Simon Davies at Chester City and he was confirmed as assistant manager early the following month. On 15 October 2008, the day before his 40th birthday, it was announced Allison had agreed playing terms with the club. Despite being named as substitute on three occasions, he did not make any appearances for City.

After Davies was sacked on 10 November 2008, Allison became Chester's caretaker manager but he informed the club he would not be applying for the position on a permanent basis. Before the club played its next match against Morecambe, Chester had reappointed Mark Wright as manager. Allison was involved in leading the team on the day but then announced he was leaving the club despite being offered the chance to remain. He later had a brief spell on the coaching staff at Bury before leaving in January 2009.

He was appointed as a coach by Tranmere Rovers in October 2009, before moving to Bradford City in July 2011.

In 2010 Allison completed a PhD at Sheffield Hallam University studying the effects of high-intensity exercise on decision-making in football.

It was announced in early 2017 that Allison would replace Christian Edwards as the first team coach of Welsh Premier League side Cardiff Metropolitan University. Allison stepped down from the role in September 2017.

== Honours ==
Swindon Town

- Football League Second Division: 1995–96
