= Junior Bent =

English footballer and coach

Personal information
- Full name: Junior Antony Bent
- Date of birth: 1 March 1970 (age 56)
- Place of birth: Huddersfield, England
- Height: 5 ft 5 in (1.65 m)
- Position: Winger

Team information
- Current team: Preston North End (Academy coach)

Youth career
- –: Huddersfield Town

Senior career*
Years	Team	Apps	(Gls)
1987–1990	Huddersfield Town	36	(6)
1989–1990	→ Burnley (loan)	9	(3)
1990–1997	Bristol City	183	(20)
1992	→ Stoke City (loan)	1	(0)
1996	→ Shrewsbury Town (loan)	6	(0)
1997–2001	Blackpool	103	(5)
2001	Kettering Town		
2002–2003	Lancaster City		
Total		338	(34)
- * Club domestic league appearances and goals

Junior Antony Bent (born 1 March 1970) is an English former professional footballer who played as a winger in the Football League for Huddersfield Town, Burnley, Bristol City, Stoke City, Shrewsbury Town and Blackpool.

Bent began his career with his hometown club Huddersfield Town playing in 44 matches and spending time on loan at Burnley before joining Bristol City in 1990. He became a regular at Ashton Gate and went on to stay for seven years making 221 appearances including short loan spells with Stoke City and Shrewsbury Town. He left Bristol City in 1997 and joined Blackpool where he stayed for three seasons before entering non-league football with Kettering Town and Lancaster City.

== Career ==
Bent began his career as a trainee at Huddersfield Town, his hometown club, making his debut in 1987. He made 36 league appearances and scored six goals for the Terriers. During the 1989–90 season, he had a loan spell at Fourth Division side Burnley, with striker Brendan O'Connell moving in the opposite direction on a similar deal. Bent made his first appearance for Burnley on 2 December 1989 in the 1–1 draw with Grimsby Town. He went on to score three times in nine matches for the Lancashire club, including two goals in the 3–0 home win over Scarborough on 9 January 1990.

In March 1990, Bent transferred to Bristol City for a £30,000 fee. He spent seven years at Ashton Gate, making more than 200 appearances in all competitions and scoring 20 league goals, and 24 in all competitions, including a brace in a 4–1 win over Hull City in October 1995, and a last-minute winner in a League Cup tie at Bristol Rovers in his final match for the club. After loan spells at Stoke City, where he played just once, away at Torquay United he went on loan again to Shrewsbury Town, in 1992 and 1996 respectively, Bent signed for Blackpool in 1997 for a nominal fee. In four years at Bloomfield Road he made just over 100 appearances and found the net on five occasions. He was released in 2001, and finished his career with brief spells at non-league clubs Kettering Town and, after a year out of the game, Lancaster City.

== Post-retirement ==
Bent now coaches at Preston North End. He is the Under 15s Coach.

== Personal life ==
Born in England, Bent is of Jamaican descent. He is a relative of the footballer Darren Bent. Bent's son Cory is also a professional footballer and played in Canada for HFX Wanderers.

== Career statistics ==
Appearances and goals by club, season and competition
Club	Season	League			FA Cup		League Cup		Other^{[A]}		Total	
Club	Season	Division	Apps	Goals	Apps	Goals	Apps	Goals	Apps	Goals	Apps	Goals
Huddersfield Town	1987–88	Second Division	7	0	1	0	0	0	0	0	8	0
Huddersfield Town	1988–89	Third Division	22	5	3	1	0	0	2	0	27	6
Huddersfield Town	1989–90	Third Division	7	1	0	0	1	0	1	0	9	1
Huddersfield Town	Total		36	6	4	1	1	0	3	0	44	7
Burnley (loan)	1989–90	Fourth Division	9	3	0	0	0	0	0	0	9	3
Bristol City	1989–90	Third Division	1	0	0	0	0	0	0	0	1	0
Bristol City	1990–91	Second Division	20	2	1	0	3	0	1	0	25	2
Bristol City	1991–92	Second Division	17	2	4	1	1	0	0	0	22	3
Bristol City	1992–93	First Division	20	3	0	0	0	0	3	0	23	3
Bristol City	1993–94	First Division	20	2	4	0	0	0	0	0	24	2
Bristol City	1994–95	First Division	41	6	3	1	2	0	0	0	46	7
Bristol City	1995–96	Second Division	40	2	2	0	4	0	3	0	49	2
Bristol City	1996–97	Second Division	22	3	1	0	1	0	3	0	27	3
Bristol City	1997–98	Second Division	2	0	0	0	2	1	0	0	4	1
Bristol City	Total		183	20	15	2	13	1	10	0	221	23
Stoke City (loan)	1991–92	Third Division	1	0	0	0	0	0	0	0	1	0
Shrewsbury Town (loan)	1996–97	Second Division	6	0	0	0	0	0	0	0	6	0
Blackpool	1997–98	Second Division	36	3	2	0	0	0	3	0	41	3
Blackpool	1998–99	Second Division	39	1	1	0	2	1	1	0	43	2
Blackpool	1999–2000	Second Division	28	1	2	0	2	0	3	0	35	1
Blackpool	Total		103	5	5	0	4	1	7	0	119	6
Career Total			338	34	24	3	18	2	20	0	400	39

A. The "Other" column constitutes appearances and goals in the Anglo-Italian Cup, Football League play-offs and Football League Trophy.
