= Burnley F.C. in European football =

English club in European football

- Club: Burnley F.C.
- Seasons played: 3
- Most appearances: Brian Miller (12) (Note: Only appearances and goals in UEFA-sanctioned European competitions and the Inter-Cities Fairs Cup are counted.)
- Top scorer: Andy Lochhead (6)
- First entry: 1960–61 European Cup
- Latest entry: 2018–19 UEFA Europa League

Burnley Football Club is an English professional association football club founded in 1882. Burnley first played against foreign opposition—Scottish club Cowlairs—in 1885, and embarked on their first overseas tour in 1914, playing sides from the German Empire and Austria-Hungary. Further trips to foreign countries followed in the next decades. In 1955, UEFA launched the first officially sanctioned European club competition, the European Cup. Burnley won their second First Division title in 1959–60, and as a result qualified for the 1960–61 European Cup. They eliminated French champions Stade de Reims in the first round before being sent out of the contest by West German champions Hamburger SV in the quarter-final. Burnley's next campaign in a European club competition came six years later, in the 1966–67 Inter-Cities Fairs Cup, where they were again eliminated by a West German side (Eintracht Frankfurt) in the quarter-final. In 2018, Burnley qualified for the 2018–19 UEFA Europa League, reaching the play-off round.

The side also competed in minor international football tournaments in the 1970s and early 1980s. Burnley participated in two editions of the Texaco Cup, a competition involving sides from England, Scotland, Northern Ireland and the Republic of Ireland that had not qualified for UEFA-sanctioned European competitions or the Inter-Cities Fairs Cup. They reached the 1974 final but lost against Newcastle United after extra time. Burnley later competed in the Anglo-Scottish Cup—the Texaco Cup's successor—on five occasions and won the tournament in 1978–79, after they defeated Oldham Athletic 4–2 on aggregate in the final.

== History ==
=== Foreign opponents and overseas tours ===
Burnley were founded in May 1882, and initially played their matches against local clubs. In January 1885, Burnley's committee invited Scottish clubs Cowlairs, Kilmarnock, and Glasgow Northern to play friendlies at Burnley's home ground, Turf Moor. Cowlairs were Burnley's first foreign opponents; the match ended in a 2–2 draw. Burnley subsequently lost 3–2 to Kilmarnock, but defeated Northern 4–0. Several weeks after winning the 1914 FA Cup final, the club embarked on its first tour to continental Europe, playing sides from the German Empire and Austria-Hungary. Burnley's first match against foreign opposition on foreign soil ended in a 2–1 win over Viktoria Berlin. Scottish Cup winners Celtic also made a trip to the continent; Hungarian club Ferencváros put up a vase—the Budapest Cup—for a charity match between Burnley and Celtic in Budapest. The game ended in a draw, with a replay held at Turf Moor several months later, which Celtic won 2–1. Burnley embarked on a tour to Italy during the off-season in 1922, which included a 1–0 victory against Football League champions Liverpool in Milan, and to Germany and the Netherlands in 1927, where they won five of six matches and scored thirty goals.

During the late 1940s and the 1950s, the club embarked on several overseas tours. During their trip in Spain in 1949, Burnley defeated Barcelona 1–0 at Barça's Camp de Les Corts. Burnley remained unbeaten during their stay in Turkey in 1951, defeating Fenerbahçe 3–2 and drawing with Beşiktaş and Galatasaray. In 1954, Burnley travelled to the African island nations Madagascar and Mauritius. They won all 7 matches—including a 14–1 victory against Madagascan side Tananarive—scoring 48 goals. Fifty years later, the Mauritian newspaper L'Express described Burnley's 1954 tour as "innovative" as the Mauritian footballers made acquaintance with new footballing techniques.

In 1955, UEFA launched the first officially sanctioned European club competition, the European Cup—a tournament contested between several national champions and other European sides. Burnley won their second First Division title in 1959–60 under the management of Harry Potts. The club's squad consisted of mostly players who came through the Burnley youth academy; a transfer fee was paid for only two players, for Jimmy McIlroy in 1950 and for Alex Elder in 1959. After the 1959–60 season ended, the team travelled to the United States to represent England in the International Soccer League, the first modern international American soccer tournament. Burnley defeated Bayern Munich (West Germany), Glenavon (Northern Ireland) and Nice (France) but finished runners-up in the group stage behind Kilmarnock.

=== 1960–61 European Cup ===
I still have nightmares about that.

— Jimmy McIlroy on his missed chance in the final minute of the second leg of the quarter-final against Hamburger SV.

As a result of their First Division title win, Burnley played the following season in European competition for the first time, in the 1960–61 European Cup. They were the third English club to compete in the European Cup, after Manchester United and Wolverhampton Wanderers. Burnley received a bye in the preliminary round and were drawn against French club Stade de Reims in the first round. Reims were the 1959–60 French Division 1 champions, and were European Cup runners-up in 1956 and 1959. The first leg was played at Turf Moor, with Burnley winning 2–0. Jimmy Robson scored in the first minute and McIlroy netted a second in the 22nd minute. The return leg, played two weeks later at Parc des Princes in Paris, ended in a 3–2 loss, although Robson had put Burnley 1–0 ahead. During the game, Potts ran on the pitch to put the ball back to its correct place during a Reims free-kick, having become exasperated by their several attempts to steal a few yards, after which he was taken off the field by the local police. Despite the loss and crowd disturbances, Burnley won 4–3 on aggregate and progressed to the quarter-final, in which the club faced West German champions Hamburger SV. At Turf Moor, in front of around 46,000 spectators, Brian Pilkington scored twice to put Burnley 2–0 up with Robson adding a third, before Hamburg pulled one back in the last minutes of the game. The second leg was played two months later at the Volksparkstadion, amid a congested fixture schedule for Burnley, and was broadcast live on the BBC. Uwe Seeler scored twice in a 4–1 win for Hamburg, while McIlroy hit the post from 6 yards (5.5 m) out in the last minute, leading to Burnley's elimination from the competition.

Later, in 1999, McIlroy reflected that Burnley should have progressed further in the competition, but that their naivety and insistence on attacking rather than defending had cost them, although they had learned from the experience.

=== 1966–67 Inter-Cities Fairs Cup ===
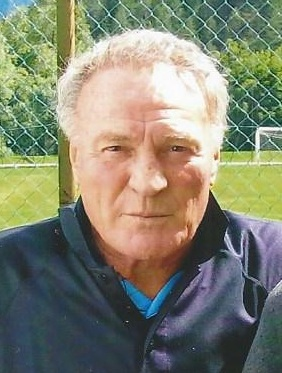
José Altafini's (2013 photograph) penalty for Napoli was saved by Harry Thomson, who was later hailed by the Daily Express as a "God in a green jersey".

The maximum wage in the Football League was abolished in 1961, which meant that clubs from small towns like Burnley could no longer compete financially with sides from bigger towns and cities, and damaged Burnley's fortunes. The side ventured back into international football competition, however, with qualification for the 1966–67 Inter-Cities Fairs Cup due to a third-place finish in the 1965–66 First Division. (Note: Burnley had sought to enter the Inter-Cities Fairs Cup in 1962–63 after finishing second in the 1961–62 First Division, but their application was rejected by the Fairs Cup committee as Burnley was neither a city nor the host of a trade fair. From 1964 onwards, qualification was determined by league position.) The Inter-Cities Fairs Cup was another European competition which started in 1955. It was organised by the Fairs Cup committee, which was backed by several FIFA executive committee members; as the Inter-Cities Fairs Cup was not under the auspices of UEFA, it does not consider teams' records in the Fairs Cup to be part of their European record. FIFA does view the competition as a major honour.

The first round draw paired Burnley with another West German team: VfB Stuttgart. The first leg was played at Stuttgart's Neckarstadion and ended in a 1–1 draw. Burnley's Willie Irvine scored the first goal, but the team ended the match with 10 players after Brian O'Neil was sent off at the end of the game. Burnley won the return leg with a scoreline of 2–0 and progressed to the second round to face Swiss side Lausanne Sports. They defeated Lausanne 8–1 on aggregate; Burnley won 3–1 away and 5–0 at home, with Andy Lochhead scoring a hat-trick in the latter match. The club was paired with Italian club Napoli in the following round. The first leg, at Turf Moor, ended in a 3–0 Burnley victory with goals from Ralph Coates, Les Latcham, and Lochhead, who scored his sixth goal in the competition. Napoli ended the game with 10 men after defender Dino Panzanato was sent off for kicking Lochhead in the head. The Italian press previewed the return leg in a belligerent manner, "From Lancashire where studs are made out of rose petals ... to Naples where visiting players are put through a mincing machine at the end of the game and their remains are roasted on a spit". A crowd of 60,000 saw Burnley goalkeeper Harry Thomson make 13 saves, including a penalty kick from José Altafini, as the match ended in a goalless draw. The team coach was escorted to the local airport by a protective convoy to escape the Napoli fans. The Daily Express later hailed Thomson as a "God in a green jersey", while the Burnley Star highlighted the "barbaric conduct shown by the defeated Naples team and their lunatic spectators". The quarter-final draw paired Burnley with Eintracht Frankfurt. The first leg, played in Frankfurt, ended in a 1–1 draw, with Brian Miller scoring for Burnley. In the return match, Eintracht took a 2–0 lead. Miller halved the score, but the team were unable to find an equaliser and were again eliminated by a West German side.

=== 2018–19 UEFA Europa League ===
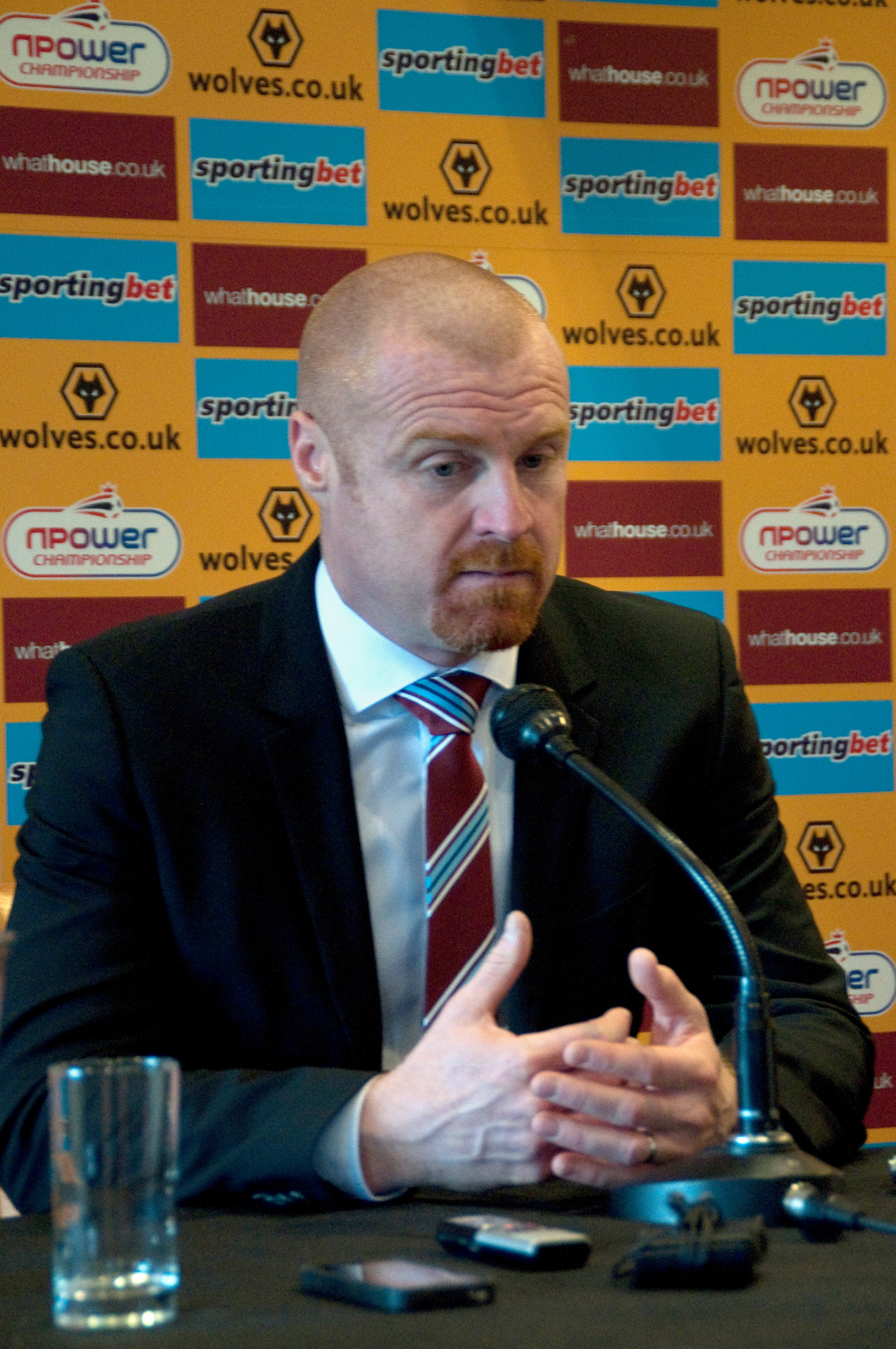
Manager Sean Dyche (2013 photograph) accused Olympiacos' staff of intimidating the officials during the first leg of the play-off round.

Burnley had to wait more than 50 years for their third appearance in a major European football competition. During that period, the club played in all four professional divisions and only avoided relegation to the non-League fifth-tier Football Conference on the last matchday in 1986–87. The team finished in seventh position in the 2017–18 Premier League, which ensured qualification for the 2018–19 UEFA Europa League second qualifying round.

Burnley were drawn against Scottish side Aberdeen, setting up an all-British tie. The first leg at Aberdeen's Pittodrie Stadium ended in a 1–1 draw, after Sam Vokes scored the equaliser for Burnley. As the second leg also finished 1–1 after 90 minutes, the game went into extra time, during which goals from Jack Cork and Ashley Barnes secured a 3–1 win for Burnley. They were paired with Turkish club İstanbul Başakşehir in the third qualifying round. Both games ended in goalless draws after 90 minutes; Cork scored the only goal in extra time in the second leg, setting up a tie with Greek club Olympiacos in the play-off round, the last phase before the group stage. Five Burnley supporters were injured in incidents of violence before the first leg started in Piraeus. Burnley lost 3–1, and ended the match with 10 men after defender Ben Gibson was sent off. Olympiacos owner Evangelos Marinakis had reportedly entered the referee's room at half-time to express his frustration with the arbiter's performance. Burnley manager Sean Dyche later accused Olympiacos' staff of intimidating the officials. In the return leg, Burnley missed multiple chances to score. The game finished 1–1 with Matěj Vydra scoring on his Burnley debut. The team lost 4–2 on aggregate and went out of the competition.

== Record ==
=== By season ===
Burnley's record in UEFA-sanctioned European competitions and the Inter-Cities Fairs Cup
Season	Competition	Round	Club	Country	Home result (Note: Burnley score is given first in each result.)	Away result	Notes
1960–61	European Cup	First round	Stade de Reims	France	2–0	2–3	(Note: Burnley qualified for the 1960–61 European Cup by winning the 1959–60 First Division. They received a bye in the preliminary round.)
1960–61	European Cup	Quarter-final	Hamburger SV	West Germany	3–1	1–4	
1966–67	Inter-Cities Fairs Cup	First round	VfB Stuttgart	West Germany	2–0	1–1	(Note: Burnley qualified for the 1966–67 Inter-Cities Fairs Cup by finishing third in the 1965–66 First Division.)
1966–67	Inter-Cities Fairs Cup	Second round	Lausanne Sports	Switzerland	5–0	3–1	
1966–67	Inter-Cities Fairs Cup	Third round	Napoli	Italy	3–0	0–0	
1966–67	Inter-Cities Fairs Cup	Quarter-final	Eintracht Frankfurt	West Germany	1–2	1–1	
2018–19	UEFA Europa League	Second qualifying round	Aberdeen	Scotland	3–1 (Note: After extra time)	1–1	(Note: Burnley qualified for the 2018–19 UEFA Europa League by finishing seventh in the 2017–18 Premier League.)
2018–19	UEFA Europa League	Third qualifying round	İstanbul Başakşehir	Turkey	1–0	0–0	
2018–19	UEFA Europa League	Play-off round	Olympiacos	Greece	1–1	1–3	

=== By competition ===
Competition	Played	Won	Drawn	Lost	Goals for	Goals against
European Cup	4	2	0	2	8	8
Inter-Cities Fairs Cup	8	4	3	1	16	5
UEFA Europa League	6	2	3	1	7	6
Total	18	8	6	4	31	19

=== By nation ===
Nation	Played	Won	Drawn	Lost	Goals for	Goals against	Opponents
France	2	1	0	1	4	3	Stade de Reims
Germany (Note: Including West Germany)	6	2	2	2	9	9	Hamburger SV, VfB Stuttgart, Eintracht Frankfurt
Greece	2	0	1	1	2	4	Olympiacos
Italy	2	1	1	0	3	0	Napoli
Scotland	2	1	1	0	4	2	Aberdeen
Switzerland	2	2	0	0	8	1	Lausanne Sports
Turkey	2	1	1	0	1	0	İstanbul Başakşehir

=== By location ===
Location	Played	Won	Drawn	Lost	Goals for	Goals against
Turf Moor	9	7	1	1	21	5
Away venues	9	1	5	3	10	14
Total	18	8	6	4	31	19

== Texaco Cup and Anglo-Scottish Cup ==
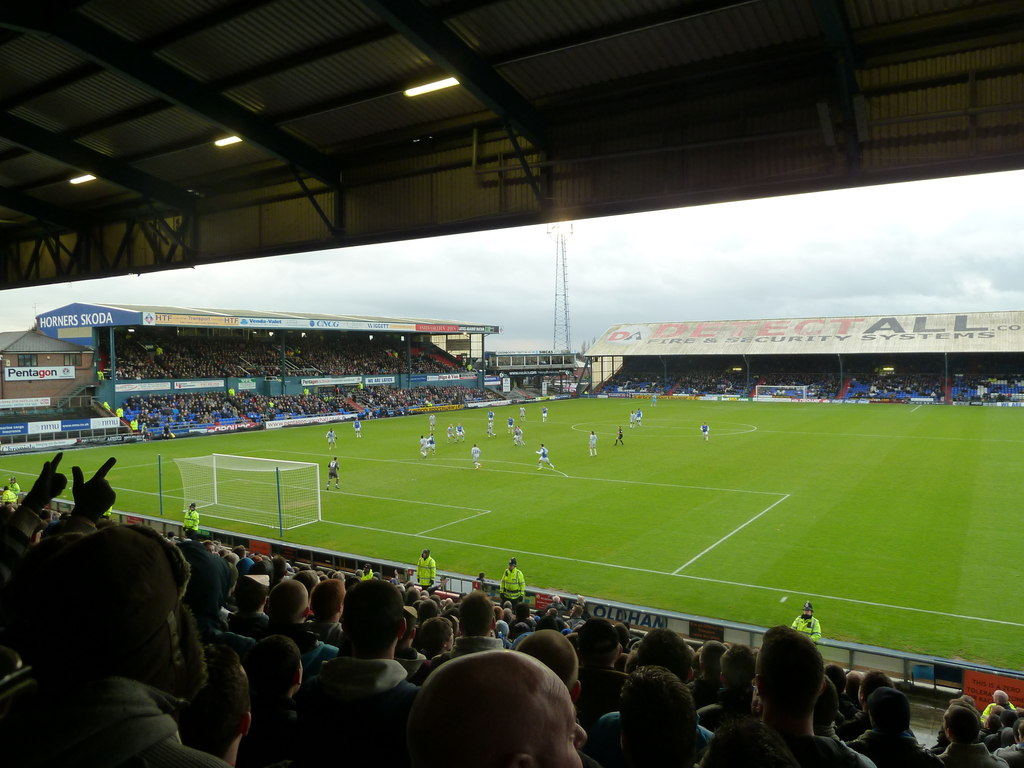
The first leg of the 1978–79 Anglo-Scottish Cup final was held at Oldham Athletic's Boundary Park (2011 photograph), with Burnley winning 4–1.

The Texaco Cup was a competition launched in 1970, involving sides from England, Scotland, Northern Ireland and the Republic of Ireland that had not qualified for UEFA-sanctioned European competitions or the Inter-Cities Fairs Cup. Burnley participated in the inaugural 1970–71 season where they were eliminated in the first round by Scottish side Heart of Midlothian. Burnley won the first leg 3–1 but lost 4–1 in the return match. The club's only other participation in the tournament was in the 1973–74 edition. In the first round, the club was paired with Scottish team East Fife. Burnley won the first match 7–0—a record victory in the competition—and the return leg 3–2 after having been 2–0 behind. The team defeated Heart of Midlothian 8–0 on aggregate in the following round to set up a semi-final with Norwich City. After recording a 2–0 victory in the first leg, Burnley went 2–0 behind in the second match, only to score three times in the last six minutes of the game to progress to the final. There they faced Newcastle United, with the final played as a single match at Newcastle's St James' Park. Paul Fletcher scored halfway through the first half to put Burnley in front. Newcastle soon equalised, and the game went to extra time, where the hosts scored again to win 2–1.

In 1975, the Texaco Cup was replaced with the Anglo-Scottish Cup, with only English and Scottish clubs participating in the tournament. Burnley competed in the Anglo-Scottish Cup on five occasions between 1976 and 1981. They were eliminated four times in the group stage and progressed to the knockout stage only once, in 1978–79. In that season, the team defeated Preston North End (3–2) and Blackpool (3–1), and drew with Blackburn Rovers (1–1), who also beat Preston and Blackpool; as Burnley twice scored three goals in a match, (Note: In several editions of the Texaco Cup and the Anglo-Scottish Cup, a team earned one bonus point for scoring three times or more in a match.) they received two bonus points while Blackburn received none. Burnley thus topped the group and progressed to the quarter-final where they faced Celtic. The Scots had started their season with eight consecutive victories, including a 3–1 win in the Old Firm match, before travelling to Turf Moor for the first leg. Steve Kindon scored the game's only goal to give Burnley the victory in front of around 30,000 spectators. The match was overshadowed by crowd violence, as Celtic fans hurled bottles, stones and iron railings at police officers and Burnley supporters. The violence left 60 people injured and forced many Burnley fans to flee onto the pitch. They also defeated Celtic in the away game—a 2–1 victory, the scorers being Ian Brennan and Kindon—to win 3–1 on aggregate and progress to the semi-final to play Mansfield Town. After Burnley won 2–1 at Mansfield, described by the Burnley Express as "one of the greatest acts of soccer robbery", they lost 1–0 at home after extra time. As it finished 2–2 on aggregate, a penalty shoot-out, a first at Turf Moor, was required to determine the winner, which Burnley won 8–7. They faced Oldham Athletic in the final, with the first leg taking place at Oldham's Boundary Park on 5 December 1978. On an icy pitch, Kindon scored in the first minute, with Peter Noble adding a second goal two minutes later. Halfway through the second half, Jim Thomson and Kindon both scored to put Burnley 4–0 up. Oldham netted a consolidation goal in the closing minutes, but Burnley won the match 4–1. The second leg took place a week later at Turf Moor, and resulted in a 1–0 victory for Oldham. Burnley won 4–2 on aggregate to lift the trophy for the first and only time.

In 1981, the Scottish clubs withdrew from the competition as the attendances were low and the English teams were increasingly drawn from the lower leagues. The tournament continued with English entrants only as the Football League Group Cup, which was replaced by the Associate Members' Cup in 1983.

=== By season ===
Burnley's record in the Texaco Cup and the Anglo-Scottish Cup
Season	Competition	Round	Club	Country	Home result	Away result	Notes
1970–71	Texaco Cup	First round	Heart of Midlothian	Scotland	3–1	1–4	
1973–74	Texaco Cup	First round	East Fife	Scotland	7–0	3–2	
1973–74	Texaco Cup	Second round	Heart of Midlothian	Scotland	5–0	3–0	
1973–74	Texaco Cup	Semi-final	Norwich City	England	2–0	3–2	
1973–74	Texaco Cup	Final	Newcastle United	England	—	1–2	(Note: The final was played as a single match, away at St James' Park, Newcastle.)
1976–77	Anglo-Scottish Cup	Group stage	Blackburn Rovers	England	—	1–1	
1976–77	Anglo-Scottish Cup	Group stage	Blackpool	England	—	1–2	
1976–77	Anglo-Scottish Cup	Group stage	Bolton Wanderers	England	1–0	—	(Note: Burnley finished third in their group and were eliminated.)
1977–78	Anglo-Scottish Cup	Group stage	Blackburn Rovers	England	2–1	—	
1977–78	Anglo-Scottish Cup	Group stage	Bolton Wanderers	England	—	0–1	
1977–78	Anglo-Scottish Cup	Group stage	Blackpool	England	0–4	—	(Note: Burnley finished fourth in their group and were eliminated.)
1978–79	Anglo-Scottish Cup	Group stage	Preston North End	England	3–2	—	
1978–79	Anglo-Scottish Cup	Group stage	Blackpool	England	3–1	—	
1978–79	Anglo-Scottish Cup	Group stage	Blackburn Rovers	England	—	1–1	(Note: Burnley finished first in their group and progressed to the quarter-final.)
1978–79	Anglo-Scottish Cup	Quarter-final	Celtic	Scotland	1–0	2–1	
1978–79	Anglo-Scottish Cup	Semi-final	Mansfield Town	England	0–1 (Note: Burnley won 8–7 on penalties.)	2–1	
1978–79	Anglo-Scottish Cup	Final	Oldham Athletic	England	0–1	4–1	
1979–80	Anglo-Scottish Cup	Group stage	Blackburn Rovers	England	—	2–2	
1979–80	Anglo-Scottish Cup	Group stage	Blackpool	England	—	2–3	
1979–80	Anglo-Scottish Cup	Group stage	Preston North End	England	1–2	—	
1980–81	Anglo-Scottish Cup	Group stage	Bury	England	—	1–2	
1980–81	Anglo-Scottish Cup	Group stage	Oldham Athletic	England	3–1	—	
1980–81	Anglo-Scottish Cup	Group stage	Shrewsbury Town	England	1–1	—	(Note: Burnley finished second in their group and were eliminated.)

Key to colours

Gold	Winners
Silver	Runners-up

=== By competition ===
Competition	Played	Won	Drawn	Lost	Goals for	Goals against
Texaco Cup	9	7	0	2	28	11
Anglo-Scottish Cup	21	9	4	8	31	29
Total	30	16	4	10	59	40

=== By location ===
Location	Played	Won	Drawn	Lost	Goals for	Goals against
Turf Moor	15	10	1	4	32	15
Away venues	15	6	3	6	27	25
Total	30	16	4	10	59	40
