= 1974–75 Nottingham Forest F.C. season =

English football club season

Nottingham Forest F.C.
1974–75 season
- Chairman: Jim H. Willmer
- Manager: Allan Brown (until 29 December 1974); Bill Anderson (caretaker); Brian Clough (from 6 January 1975)
- Second Division: 16th
- FA Cup: Sixth round
- League Cup: 2nd round
- Top goalscorer: League: Neil Martin (10); All: Neil Martin (12)
- Highest home attendance: 25,013 (League); 23,355 (Cup)
- Lowest home attendance: 9,534 (League); 14,183 (Cup)
- Average home league attendance: 17,639 (League)
Home colours	Away colours

The 1974–75 season was Nottingham Forest's 110th year in existence and third campaign consecutive in the Second Division since their relegation in 1972.

== Summary ==
During summer the club reinforced the side transferred in several players, left back Paddy Greenwood from Boston Minutemen, Welsh defender Dave Jones from AFC Bournemouth and forward Barry Butlin from Luton Town F.C. From the youth squad arrived goalkeeper John Middleton and defender Viv Anderson for the right back position. After a bad streak of results, included an early elimination in League Cup on 6 January 1975 the board sacked Allan Brown and appointed former Derby County 1972 League Champion manager Brian Clough. Also, Jimmy Gordon arrived as club trainer as the Scottishman had been for Clough at Derby County and Leeds United. The two made their debut in League winning at Fulham bringing with him two players from his 44-day failed tenure in Leeds United: midfielder John McGovern and forward John O'Hare. However, the team plummeted 11 successive matches without a win. The squad reached two games won in the last five rounds to avoid relegation to Third Division.

Meanwhile, in FA Cup the team in third round, now with Clough, defeated Tottenham Hotspur and advanced to the fourth round being eliminated by Fulham F.C. after three replay matches.

== Squad ==
Note: Flags indicate national team as defined under FIFA eligibility rules; some limited exceptions apply. Players may hold more than one non-FIFA nationality.

Pos.	Nation	Player
GK	ENG	John Middleton
GK	ENG	Dennis Peacock
DF	ENG	Viv Anderson
DF	ENG	Sammy Chapman (Captain)
DF	ENG	John Cottam
DF	ENG	Paddy Greenwood
DF	NIR	Liam O'Kane
DF	ENG	Dave Serella
MF	ENG	Ian Bowyer
MF	IRL	Miah Dennehy
MF	WAL	Dave Jones
MF	NIR	Tommy Jackson

Pos.	Nation	Player
MF	SCO	George Lyall
MF	SCO	John McGovern
MF	ENG	Jim McIntosh
MF	NIR	Martin O'Neill
MF	ENG	Paul Richardson
MF	SCO	John Robertson
FW	ENG	Barry Butlin
FW	ENG	John Galley
FW	SCO	Neil Martin
FW	ENG	James McCann
FW	SCO	John O'Hare
FW	ENG	Tony Woodock

=== Transfers ===
In
Pos.	Name	from	Type
GK	John Middleton		Free
DF	Paddy Greenwood	Boston Minutemen	£10,000
DF	Dave Jones	AFC Bournemouth	
FW	Barry Butlin	Luton Town F.C.	£120,000

Out
Pos.	Name	To	Type
FW	Duncan McKenzie	Leeds United	£250,000
FW	John Galley	Peterborough United F.C.	loan
GK	Jim Barron	Swindon Town	
FW	David Serella	Walsall F.C.	
DF	John Winfield	Peterborough United F.C.	

==== Winter ====
In
Pos.	Name	from	Type
DF	Viv Anderson		Free
MF	John McGovern	Leeds United	£81,000
FW	John O'Hare	Leeds United	£49,000

Out
Pos.	Name	To	Type
DF	Dave Serella	Walsall F.C.	

== Competitions ==
=== Second Division ===
==== League Table ====
Pos	Team	Pld	W	D	L	GF	GA	GAv	Pts
14	Notts County	42	12	16	14	49	59	0.831	40
15	York City	42	14	10	18	51	55	0.927	38
16	Nottingham Forest	42	12	14	16	43	55	0.782	38
17	Portsmouth	42	12	13	17	44	54	0.815	37
18	Oldham Athletic	42	10	15	17	40	48	0.833	35

Rules for classification: 1) Points; 2) Goal average; 3) Goals scored

==== Position by round ====
Round	1	2	3	4	5	6	7	8	9	10	11	12	13	14	15	16	17	18	19	20	21	22	23	24	25	26	27	28	29	30	31	32	33	34	35	36	37	38	39	40	41	42
Ground	H	A	A	H	H	A	H	H	A	H	A	A	H	A	H	A	H	A	H	A	H	A	H	A	H	A	H	A	H	A	H	A	H	A	H	A	A	H	A	H	A	H
Result	D	L	L	W	L	D	W	L	W	D	L	W	L	W	W	L	W	L	W	D	D	L	D	W	L	W	D	L	L	D	D	D	L	D	L	D	D	W	L	D	L	W
Position	15	16	21	11	18	17	13	13	10	14	14	10	12	10	8	13	9	14	11	10	11	13	13	11	13	11	9	13	14	12	15	14	15	15	16	16	16	15	17	16	17	16

Source: Competitive matches
A = Away; H = Home; W = Win; D = Draw; L = Loss; = Leader, 1975–76 First Division; = 1975–76 First Division; = 1975–76 Third Division

A list of Nottingham Forest's matches in the 1974–75 season.

==== Matches ====
17 August 1974 1	Nottingham Forest	0-0	Bristol City	West Bridgford
		Report		Stadium: City Ground

19 August 1974 2	Millwall F.C.	3–0	Nottingham Forest	Millwall

24 August 1974 3	Portsmouth	2–0	Nottingham Forest	Portsmouth

27 August 1974 4	Nottingham Forest	2–1	Millwall	West Bridgford
	Martin; Bowyer			Stadium: City Ground

31 August 1974 5	Nottingham Forest	1–2	Oxford United	West Bridgford
	Bowyer			Stadium: City Ground

7 September 1974 6	Manchester United	2–2	Nottingham Forest	Manchester
			Cottam; Bowyer	Stadium: Old Trafford

14 September 1974 7	Nottingham Forest	4–0	Hull City	West Bridgford
	Lyall; Martin; Martin; O'Neill			Stadium: City Ground

17 September 1974 8	Nottingham Forest	1–2	Portsmouth F.C.	West Bridgford
	Jones			Stadium: City Ground

21 September 1974 9	Sheffield Wednesday	2–3	Nottingham Forest	Sheffield
			Martin; Martin; Bowyer

28 September 1974 10	Nottingham Forest	1–1	Sunderland AFC	West Bridgford
	Lyall (pen.)			Stadium: City Ground

2 October 1974 11	Aston Villa	3–0	Nottingham Forest	Birmingham
				Stadium: Villa Park

5 October 1974 12	Southampton F.C.	0–1	Nottingham Forest	Southampton
			Jackson

12 October 1974 13	Nottingham Forest	1–3	Norwich City	West Bridgford
	Butlin			Stadium: City Ground

19 October 1974 14	West Bromwich Albion	0–1	Nottingham Forest	West Bromwich
			Richardson	Stadium: The Hawthorns

26 October 1974 15	Nottingham Forest	1–0	Bristol Rovers	West Bridgford
	Martin			Stadium: City Ground

2 November 1974 16	Bolton Wanderers	2–0	Nottingham Forest	Horwich
				Stadium: University of Bolton

9 November 1974 17	Nottingham Forest	1–0	Oldham Athletic	West Bridgford
	Dennehy			Stadium: City Ground

16 November 1974 18	Cardiff City F.C.	2–1	Nottingham Forest	Cardiff City
			Martin	Stadium: Cardiff

23 November 1974 19	Nottingham Forest	2–1	York City F.C.	West Bridgford
	Richardson; Bowyer			Stadium: City Ground

30 November 1974 20	Leyton Orient F.C.	1–1	Nottingham Forest	Leyton
			Bowyer	Stadium: Brisbane Road

7 December 1974 21	Nottingham Forest	1–1	Fulham F.C.	West Bridgford
	Butlin			Stadium: City Ground

14 December 1974 22	Bristol City	1–0	Nottingham Forest	Bristol
				Stadium: Ashton Gate

21 December 1974 23	Nottingham Forest	0–0	Blackpool F.C.	West Bridgford
				Stadium: City Ground

26 December 1974 24	Hull City	1–3	Nottingham Forest	Kingston upon Hull
			Martin; Martin; Butlin	Stadium: Boothferry Park

28 December 1974 25	Nottingham Forest	0–2	Notts County F.C.	West Bridgford
				Stadium: City Ground

11 January 1975 26	Fulham F.C.	0–1	Nottingham Forest	Fulham
			71' Butlin	Stadium: Craven Cottage; Attendance: 9,159

18 January 1975 27	Nottingham Forest	2–2	Leyton Orient F.C.	West Bridgford
	Richardson 86'; Richardson 88'		22' Derek Possee; 37' (o.g.) Bob Chapman	Stadium: City Ground; Attendance: 17,582

1 February 1975 28	Oldham Athletic	2–0	Nottingham Forest	Oldham
	Alan Young 23'; Alan Groves 65'			Stadium: Boundary Park; Attendance: 10,736

8 February 1975 29	Nottingham Forest	2–3	Bolton Wanderers	West Bridgford
	Dennehy 8'; Dennehy 80'		26', 38' John Byrom; 59' Hugh Curran	Stadium: City Ground; Attendance: 11,922

14 February 1975 30	York City F.C.	1–1	Nottingham Forest	York
	Jimmy Seal 44'		63' Lyall	Stadium: Bootham Crescent; Attendance: 7,666

22 February 1975 31	Nottingham Forest	0–0	Cardiff City F.C.	West Bridgford
				Stadium: City Ground; Attendance: 12,806

28 February 1975 32	Oxford United	1–1	Nottingham Forest	Oxford
	Billy Jeffrey 32'		55' Lyall	Stadium: Manor Ground; Attendance: 7,602

8 March 1975 33	Nottingham Forest	2–3	Aston Villa	West Bridgford
	O'Hare 16'; Butlin 43'		29', 40' Ray Graydon; 66' Brian Little	Stadium: City Ground; Attendance: 20,205

15 March 1975 34	Sunderland AFC	0–0	Nottingham Forest	Sunderland
				Stadium: Roker Park; Attendance: 30,812

22 March 1975 35	Nottingham Forest	0–1	Manchester United	West Bridgford
			36' Gerry Daly	Stadium: City Ground; Attendance: 21,893

25 March 1975 36	Notts County F.C.	2–2	Nottingham Forest	West Bridgford
	Ian Scanlon 20'; Paul Richardson 59' (o.g.)		40' Lyall; 78' Butlin	Stadium: City Ground; Attendance: 20,303; Referee: K Styles

29 March 1975 37	Blackpool F.C.	0–0	Nottingham Forest	Blackpool
				Stadium: Bloomfield Road; Attendance: 11,640

1 April 1975 38	Nottingham Forest	1–0	Sheffield Wednesday	West Bridgford
	Lyall 57' (pen.)			Stadium: City Ground; Attendance: 14,077

5 April 1975 39	Bristol Rovers F.C.	4–2	Nottingham Forest	Bristol
	Alan Warboys 25'; Frankie Prince 44'; Colin Dobson 56'; Dave Staniforth 72'		67' Lyall; 76' O'Hare	Stadium: Bristol; Attendance: 9,684

12 April 1975 40	Nottingham Forest	0–0	Southampton F.C.	West Bridgford
				Stadium: City Ground; Attendance: 11,554

19 April 1975 41	Norwich City	3–0	Nottingham Forest	Norwich
	Martin Peters 44'; Phil Boyer 74', 86'			Stadium: Carrow Road; Attendance: 24,302

26 April 1975 42	Nottingham Forest	2–1	West Bromwich Albion	West Bridgford
	Butlin 41'; Butlin 85'		14' Robson	Stadium: City Ground; Attendance: 11,721

=== League Cup ===
==== Second round ====
10 September 1974 1	Nottingham Forest	1–1	Newcastle United	Nottingham
				Stadium: City Ground

25 September 1974 replay	Newcastle United	3–0	Nottingham Forest	Newcastle upon Tyne
				Stadium: St. James' Park

=== FA Cup ===
==== Third round ====
4 January 1975 1	Nottingham Forest	1–1	Tottenham Hotspur	Nottingham
	Jones			Stadium: City Ground

8 January 1975 replay	Tottenham Hotspur	0–1	Nottingham Forest	Tottenham
			34' Martin	Stadium: White Hart Lane; Attendance: 27,996

==== Fourth round ====
28 January 1975 1	Fulham F.C.	0–0	Nottingham Forest	Fulham
				Stadium: Craven Cottage; Attendance: 14,846

3 February 1975 replay	Nottingham Forest	1–1 (a.e.t.)	Fulham F.C.	Nottingham
	Neil Martin 62'		44' John Dowie	Stadium: City Ground; Attendance: 25,361

5 February 1975 2nd replay	Fulham F.C.	1–1 (a.e.t.)	Nottingham Forest	Fulham
	Alan Slough 24'		46' John Robertson	Stadium: Craven Cottage; Attendance: 11,920

10 February 1975 3rd replay	Nottingham Forest	1–2	Fulham F.C.	Nottingham
	Bob Chapman 61'		26', 54' Viv Busby	Stadium: City Ground; Attendance: 23,240

== Statistics ==
=== Players statistics ===
The statistics for the following players are for their time during 1974–75 season playing for Nottingham Forest. Any stats from a different club during 1974–75 are not included. Includes all competitive matches.

No.	Pos	Nat	Player	Total		Football League Second Division		Football League Cup		FA Cup	
No.	Pos	Nat	Player	Apps	Goals	Apps	Goals	Apps	Goals	Apps	Goals
	GK	(England) ENG	Middleton	34	0	28	0	0	0	6	0
	DF	(Wales) WAL	Jones	41	2	36	1	2	0	3	1
	DF	(England) ENG	Chapman	38	0	31	0	1	0	6	0
	DF	(Northern Ireland) NIR	O'Kane	48	0	41	0	2	0	5	0
	DF	(England) ENG	Greenwood	19	0	15	0	0	0	4	0
	MF	(Republic of Ireland) IRL	Dennehy	30	3	23+3	3	2	0	2	0
	MF	(England) ENG	Bowyer	37	7	27+3	6	2	1	5	0
	MF	(England) ENG	Richardson	43	4	35+2	4	1	0	5	0
	MF	(Scotland) SCO	Lyall	41	7	35+1	7	2	0	3	0
	FW	(England) ENG	Butlin	34	7	28+1	7	0	0	5	0
	FW	(Scotland) SCO	Martin	32	12	24+2	10	1	0	5	2
	GK	(England) ENG	Peacock	16	0	14	0	2	0		
	MF	(Northern Ireland) NIR	O'Neill	23	1	16	1	2	0	5	0
	MF	(Scotland) SCO	Robertson	22	0	14+3	0	4	0	1	0
	DF	(England) ENG	Cottam	18	1	12+2	1	1	0	3	0
	MF	(Northern Ireland) NIR	Jackson	16	1	12+2	1	1	0	1	0
	DF	(England) ENG	Anderson	16	0	12+2	0	1	0	1	0
	FW	(Scotland) SCO	O'Hare	10	2	10	2				
	MF	(Scotland) SCO	McGovern	8	0	8	0				
	DF	(England) ENG	Serella	9	0	6+2	0	1	0		
	MF	(England) ENG	McIntosh	3	0	2+1	0				
	FW	(England) ENG	Galley	4	0	2+1	0	1	0	0	0
	FW	(England) ENG	Woodcock	5	0	1+4	0				
	FW	(England) ENG	McCann	1	0	1	0				

- Source: https://www.11v11.com/teams/nottingham-forest/tab/players/season/1975/
