= Viv Anderson =

English footballer and coach (born 1956)

Viv Anderson MBE
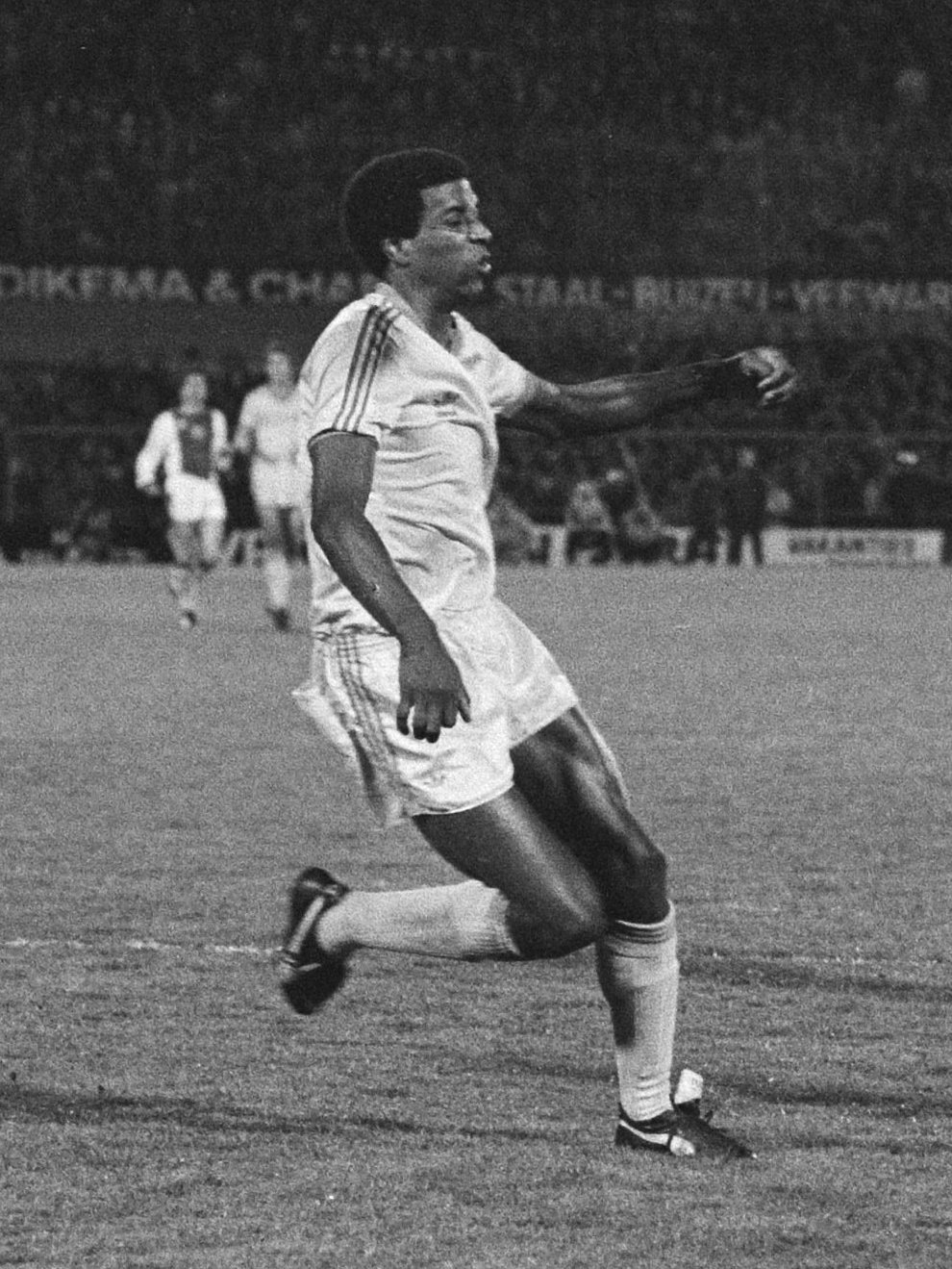
- Anderson playing for Nottingham Forest in 1980

Personal information
- Full name: Vivian Alexander Anderson
- Date of birth: 29 July 1956 (age 70)
- Place of birth: Clifton, Nottingham, England
- Height: 6 ft 0 in (1.82 m)
- Position: Right-back

Senior career*
Years	Team	Apps	(Gls)
1974–1984	Nottingham Forest	328	(15)
1984–1987	Arsenal	120	(9)
1987–1991	Manchester United	54	(3)
1991–1993	Sheffield Wednesday	70	(8)
1993–1994	Barnsley	20	(3)
1994–1995	Middlesbrough	2	(0)
Total		594	(38)

International career
1978	England U21	1	(0)
1978–1980	England B	7	(2)
1978–1988	England	30	(2)

Managerial career
- 1993–1994: Barnsley
- * Club domestic league appearances and goals

Vivian Alexander Anderson MBE (born 29 July 1956) is an English former professional footballer who played as a right-back. He is best known for his ten-year stint with Nottingham Forest, with whom he won the First Division title in 1978, as well as the European Cup in 1979 and 1980.

In 1978, he became the first black footballer to play for England's senior men's national team, and from 1980 to 1988, was selected in the England squad for four major tournaments. He also had a short-lived managerial career with Barnsley, before joining Middlesbrough as assistant manager to Bryan Robson, where he remained until 2001.

== Early life ==
Anderson was born in Clifton, Nottingham. His parents, Audley and Myrtle, were both from Jamaica. Audley came to England in 1954, while Myrtle arrived in 1955. Despite the racial tensions at the time, Anderson has said his childhood was relatively untroubled by discrimination and his parents must take a lot of credit for protecting him from the worst excesses of the environment they lived in. He spent a year as a schoolboy with Manchester United before being released. He returned to Nottingham where at school he sat and passed three CSEs. He then worked for three weeks as a silkscreen printer that he described as "a glorified tea boy really. I'd get the tea, and get the sandwiches at lunch time. I was just a dogsbody."

== Club career ==
=== Nottingham Forest ===
Anderson had broken into the Nottingham Forest team during 1974 and became a regular after the arrival of Brian Clough as manager of the East Midlands club, then in the Second Division, in January 1975. He was part of the side that won promotion to the First Division in 1977, winning the title, along with the League Cup, a year later.

Anderson was one of the first black players to represent top English clubs at the time, and regularly suffered racial abuse from fans of rival teams. He was regularly pelted with bananas and targeted with racist chants.

Anderson was part of the Forest team that retained the League Cup (though he missed the final through injury) and then clinched the European Cup in 1979 with victory over Malmö. He picked up his second European Cup winners' medal when they retained the trophy with victory over Hamburger SV in Madrid. Forest did reach a third successive League Cup final that year, but lost to Wolverhampton Wanderers. Additionally, the 1980 European Cup win was to prove to be their last trophy for nine years.

=== Arsenal ===
In the summer of 1984, he aimed to revive his career with a move to Arsenal for £250,000. His time at Arsenal saw the club develop from underachieving in the First Division, to enjoying a victory over Liverpool in the 1987 League Cup final, and he finally enjoyed some club success for the first time in seven years since the European Cup. He also scored a vital goal against rivals Tottenham Hotspur in the second leg of the semi-final. He scored 15 goals in his three seasons at Highbury, a spell that saw him make 150 appearances for the club. Much of Arsenal's upturn in fortunes at this time can be attributed to George Graham's arrival in May 1986. The side was built upon a strong defence whose training involved being connected with rope to ensure they learned to work together. At this time, Anderson provided much inspiration to the young Tony Adams. The 30-year-old Anderson was rewarded with a three-year contract offer from Arsenal at the end of the 1987 season. Arsenal expected Anderson to agree to the new deal but he instead signed with Manchester United, the same club who had released him as a teenager.

=== Manchester United ===
After a tribunal agreed £250,000 fee, he became Alex Ferguson's first signing since taking over as manager of Manchester United. At Old Trafford, Anderson was a significant part of Ferguson's rebuilding plans as he attempted to create a title-winning side to end the wait that had started at the club in 1967. Following a dismal start to the 1986–87 season that had cost Ron Atkinson his job on 5 November, Ferguson had steered United from 21st to 11th of 22 First Division clubs in the final six months of the campaign. In the 1987–88 season, United finished second in the league, nine points behind Liverpool.

Anderson remained first-choice right-back in the 1988–89 season, but United had a slow start to the season and despite an upturn in their form in the new year that saw them climb to third place by mid-February. They finished in 11th place. Despite finishing 13th in the league in the 1989–90 season, United won the FA Cup – but Anderson was not in the squad for the final.

Anderson's hopes of winning his place back in the 1990–91 season were dashed when Ferguson paid Oldham Athletic £625,000 for Denis Irwin, who quickly established himself as the first-choice right-back, while Ince switched back to central midfield. He played three more games for the club, and on his final appearance for them in the League Cup second round, second leg against Halifax Town on 10 October 1990, he scored their first goal in a 2–1 win that led to a 5–2 aggregate victory.

=== Sheffield Wednesday ===
Anderson joined Sheffield Wednesday on a free transfer in January 1991, helping them to promotion from the Second Division, although he missed the League Cup final triumph over Manchester United as he had played for his old club earlier in the competition. Despite originally being thought of as a short-term signing, Anderson established himself in the Wednesday first team and captained the side on many occasions. He played an active part in the Owls team that finished third in the 1991–92 First Division and seventh in the first season of the Premier League. He also helped Wednesday reach the FA Cup and League Cup final in 1993, but they were on the losing side to Arsenal in both finals.

== International career ==
Anderson made his debut for England in November 1978, for a friendly against Czechoslovakia. He became the third non-white footballer to represent the men's senior England team after Paul Reaney (who had first appeared for England in 1968) and Frank Soo (who appeared for England during wartime). Coach Ron Greenwood was insistent that no political issue was at stake, despite the ever-rising number of young black stars in the game, born and raised in England. His second cap was in a friendly against Sweden in June 1979. His third appearance was his first competitive international as England defeated Bulgaria 2–0 at Wembley in a qualifier for the 1980 European Championships.

England had duly got through to the European Championship finals in Italy and Anderson was named in Greenwood's squad, playing in the final group game against Spain as a replacement for Phil Neal. England won 2–1 but did not progress further. Anderson later made his World Cup qualifying debut in a qualifier for the 1982 competition in a 4–0 win over Norway.

Injury to Kevin Keegan had meant Greenwood needed to call upon an experienced club captain to lead the team out in Spain, so Ipswich Town's skipper Mick Mills, normally a left-back, was put in the right-back slot (with regular incumbent Kenny Sansom remaining on the left) and both Neal and Anderson missed out. Neal played against Kuwait in the final group game to rest Sansom when qualification had already been assured, but Sansom returned for the second phase, from which England were eliminated. Anderson, meanwhile, never kicked a ball.

Anderson's England career seemed to be stalling. After the World Cup and Greenwood's departure, he did not feature at all under new coach Bobby Robson until 1984, with Neal still mainly getting the nod. England failed to qualify for the 1984 European Championships during this period. Anderson finally won an 11th cap, in April 1984, almost two years after his tenth.

After his move to Arsenal, Anderson revitalised his international standing and he won six consecutive caps from 1984 and into 1985, including four qualifiers for the 1986 World Cup in Mexico; in the first of which he scored his first of his two international goals in an 8–0 victory over Turkey. Then Robson gave a debut to the young Everton right-back Gary Stevens. Anderson won three caps at the end of 1986 as England began their quest to qualify for the 1988 European Championships in Germany. In one of the qualifiers against Yugoslavia, Anderson scored his second and final international goal.

Meanwhile, Stevens had forced his way back in as England qualified for the European Championships and Anderson won his 30th and (what proved to be) final cap in a Rous Cup game against Colombia though was again in reserve when the squad went to West Germany for the finals. They lost all three group games and Stevens came in for criticism, but maintained his place. For the third time, Anderson had travelled to a major international competition without getting a minute on the pitch. Robson began to look to the younger end of the playing spectrum for competition for Stevens, and Anderson's international career ended.

== Coaching career ==
=== Barnsley ===
In June 1993, Anderson left Hillsborough to be appointed player-manager of Barnsley, following the departure of Mel Machin. In his first season at Oakwell, Barnsley narrowly avoided relegation to Division Two.

=== Middlesbrough ===
At the end of the 1993–94 season, Anderson quit Barnsley after just a year to become assistant manager of Middlesbrough under former Old Trafford teammate Bryan Robson.

Despite retiring from playing football in 1994, Anderson was still officially registered as a player and following an injury crisis at Middlesbrough he played two games for the club in the 1994–95 season, when they were promoted to the Premier League as First Division champions. After gaining promotion, he finally hung up his playing boots.

Anderson helped Robson assemble a side that reached both domestic cup finals (both of which they lost) in the 1996–97 season, although they were relegated due to a three-point deduction for postponing a December fixture at late notice as a result of so many players being unable to play due to illness or injury. However, Boro won promotion at the first attempt and were League Cup runners-up once again. Robson and Anderson left Middlesbrough in June 2001, after surviving a further relegation scare. Anderson has not been employed in football since leaving the assistant manager's job at Middlesbrough.

== Personal life ==
Anderson has three children with his ex-wife. One of his sons is professional footballer Freddie Anderson. He was appointed to the Order of the British Empire, with the rank of Member, by Elizabeth II in her 2000 New Year Honours, and was inducted into the English Football Hall of Fame in 2004 in recognition of his impact on the English league.

As of 2005, Anderson ran a sports travel agency and also worked as a goodwill ambassador for the Football Association. He appears as an occasional guest pundit on MUTV, Manchester United's official TV station.

Anderson was set to auction off more than 100 shirts, as well as his medals, in October 2024. This includes the shirt he wore on his on his England debut against Czechoslovakia in 1978 which had previously been displayed at the People's History Museum in Manchester.

== Career statistics ==
=== International ===
Appearances and goals by national team and year
National team	Year	Apps	Goals
England
England	1978	1	0
England	1979	2	0
England	1980	2	0
England	1981	3	0
England	1982	2	0
England	1983	–	–
England	1984	2	1
England	1985	7	0
England	1986	5	1
England	1987	4	0
England	1988	2	0
Total		30	2

=== International goals ===
Scores and results list England's goal tally first, score column indicates score after each Anderson goal.

List of international goals scored by Viv Anderson
No.	Date	Venue	Opponent	Score	Result	Competition
1	14 November 1984	BJK İnönü Stadium, Istanbul, Turkey	Turkey	8–0	8–0	1986 World Cup qualifying
2	12 November 1986	Wembley, London, England	Yugoslavia	2–0	2–0	UEFA Euro 1988 qualifying

== Honours ==
Nottingham Forest

- Football League First Division: 1977–78
- Football League Cup: 1977–78; runner-up: 1979–80
- FA Charity Shield: 1978
- European Cup: 1978–79, 1979–80
- European Super Cup: 1979
- Anglo Scottish Cup: 1976–77

Arsenal

- Football League Cup: 1986–87

Manchester United

- FA Charity Shield: 1990

Sheffield Wednesday

- FA Cup runner-up: 1992–93
- Football League Cup runner-up: 1992–93

Individual

- Onze Mondial: 1979
- PFA Team of the Year: 1978–79 First Division, 1979–80 First Division, 1986–87 First Division
