= John Middleton (footballer, born 1956) =

English footballer (1956–2016)

Personal information
- Date of birth: 24 December 1956
- Place of birth: Skegness, England
- Date of death: 3 July 2016 (aged 59)
- Place of death: Skegness, England
- Position: Goalkeeper

Senior career*
Years	Team	Apps	(Gls)
1974–1977	Nottingham Forest	90	(0)
1977–1980	Derby County	73	(0)
Total		163	(0)

International career
1975	England Youth	6	(0)
1977	England U21	3	(0)
- * Club domestic league appearances and goals

John Middleton (24 December 1956 – 3 July 2016) was an English under-21 international football goalkeeper. He won honours playing 137 first team games with Nottingham Forest. After 80 competitive first team games for Derby County he retired due to injury aged 23 in 1980.

== Nottingham Forest ==
Middleton started as an apprentice at Nottingham Forest in the 1974–75 season. Allan Brown gave him his debut aged 17 on 19 October 1974 in a Second Division 1–0 win at West Bromwich Albion. He remained first choice for the next three years playing 137 competitive and non-competitive first team games between 1974 and 1977.

Brian Clough replaced Brown as manager in January 1975 and was joined in July 1976 by his former assistant manager at Derby County, Peter Taylor. Forest immediately went into upswing from the duo being in partnership. Their first trophy was the 1976–77 Anglo-Scottish Cup beating Orient 5–1 in a two leg final in December 1976. Forest were promoted back to the top flight at the end of that season.

Forest started their return to the top league campaign with a 3–1 win at Everton. Three further wins in league and cup followed without conceding a goal. Then came five early September goals conceded losing 3–0 at Arsenal and beating Wolves 3–2 at home. Peter Shilton then signed for a record fee for a goalkeeper of £325,000. Taylor reasoned: "Shilton wins you matches."

== Derby County ==
20 year old Middleton transferred later in the month with £25,000 in exchange for Archie Gemmill moving to Forest from another top flight club, Derby County. Middleton played 80 competitive first team games (73 in the league) for Derby. A persistent shoulder injury forced his retirement from football aged 23 in 1980.

== International ==
Middleton played twice against Norway and once against Finland for England in UEFA Under 21 Championship qualifying group matches. He conceded only one goal in total winning all three games. All three games were in 1977 during his last four months at Forest. His last cap was four days before the 3–0 defeat by Arsenal playing for Forest.

== Death ==
Middleton died on 3 July 2016 aged 59.

== Honours ==
Nottingham Forest:

- 1976–77 Anglo-Scottish Cup
- 1976–77 Football League Second Division promotion
