= Dave Serella =

English footballer

Personal information
- Date of birth: 24 September 1952 (age 74)
- Place of birth: Kings Lynn, England
- Position: Central defender

Senior career*
Years	Team	Apps	(Gls)
1970–1974	Nottingham Forest	65	(0)
1974–1982	Walsall	267	(12)
1982–1984	Blackpool	44	(5)
Total		376	(17)
- * Club domestic league appearances and goals

David Serella (born 24 September 1952) is an English former professional footballer who played 376 league and cup matches for Nottingham Forest, Walsall, and Blackpool.

Serella now lives and works in Lytham St Annes.

He was one of the two players assaulted by Newcastle fans during the 1974 sixth round FA Cup tie on 9 March 1974, whilst playing in central defence alongside Bob Chapman. Newcastle United fans invaded the pitch and although the match was completed the FA ordered that the game was scrubbed from the record books and replayed at Goodison Park.

In May 2007 Serella stood for election in the Kilnhouse Ward of the Fylde Borough Council local council elections.

In February 2017, Serella revealed to BBC Radio 2 that he was living with a form of pre-dementia caused by chronic traumatic encephalopathy. The disease is associated with repeated blows to the head and is well known for affecting boxers and American football players. Serella was discussing with Vanessa Feltz the results of a study that showed footballers, particularly central defenders called upon to head heavy footballs frequently, to be at risk from the disease.
