= 1980–81 Anglo-Scottish Cup =

Tournament details
- Country: England; Scotland
- Teams: 20

Final positions
- Champions: Chesterfield
- Runners-up: Notts County

The 1980–81 Anglo-Scottish Cup was the sixth and last edition of the tournament. It was won by Chesterfield, who beat Notts County in a two-legged final by 2–1 on aggregate.

== English Group ==
=== Group A ===
Home team	Result	Away team	Date
Hull City	1–0	Grimsby Town	28 July 1980
Chesterfield	1–0	Sheffield United	31 July 1980
Grimsby Town	3–3	Chesterfield	2 August 1980
Sheffield United	2–1	Hull City	2 August 1980
Chesterfield	1–1	Hull City	5 August 1980
Sheffield United	0–1	Grimsby Town	5 August 1980

Team	Pld	W	D	L	GF	GA	GD	BP	Pts
Chesterfield	3	1	2	0	5	4	+1	1	5
Grimsby Town	3	1	1	1	4	4	0	1	4
Hull City	3	1	1	1	3	3	0	0	3
Sheffield United	3	1	0	2	2	3	−1	0	2

=== Group B ===
Home team	Result	Away team	Date
Bristol City	2–0	Fulham	2 August 1980
Notts County	2–2	Orient	2 August 1980
Fulham	0–1	Notts County	4 August 1980
Orient	1–2	Fulham	5 August 1980
Bristol City	1–1	Notts County	6 August 1980
Orient	1–0	Bristol City	22 August 1981

Team	Pld	W	D	L	GF	GA	GD	BP	Pts
Notts County	3	1	2	0	4	3	+1	0	4
Bristol City	3	1	1	1	3	2	+1	0	3
Orient	3	1	1	1	4	4	0	0	3
Fulham	3	1	0	2	2	4	−2	0	2

=== Group C ===
Home team	Result	Away team	Date
Bury	2–1	Burnley	29 July 1980
Burnley	3–1	Oldham Athletic	2 August 1980
Shrewsbury Town	3–0	Bury	2 August 1980
Burnley	1–1	Shrewsbury Town	5 August 1980
Bury	3–2	Oldham Athletic	5 August 1980
Oldham Athletic	4–1	Shrewsbury Town	9 August 1980

Team	Pld	W	D	L	GF	GA	GD	BP	Pts
Bury	3	2	0	1	5	6	−1	1	5
Burnley	3	1	1	1	5	4	+1	1	4
Shrewsbury Town	3	1	1	1	5	5	0	1	4
Oldham Athletic	3	1	0	2	7	7	0	1	3

=== Group D ===
Home team	Result	Away team	Date
Blackpool	2–0	Blackburn Rovers	30 July 1980
Preston North End	0–0	Carlisle United	30 July 1980
Carlisle United	1–2	Blackpool	2 August 1980
Preston North End	0–1	Blackburn Rovers	2 August 1980
Carlisle United	1–4	Blackburn Rovers	5 August 1980
Preston North End	0–1	Blackpool	5 August 1980

Team	Pld	W	D	L	GF	GA	GD	BP	Pts
Blackpool	3	3	0	0	5	1	+4	2	6
Blackburn Rovers	3	2	0	1	5	3	+2	1	5
Preston North End	3	0	1	2	0	2	−2	0	1
Carlisle United	3	0	1	2	2	6	−4	0	1

== Scottish Group ==
=== 1st round 1st leg ===
Home team	Result	Away team	Date
Airdrieonians	3–0	Hearts	30 July 1980
Kilmarnock	1–3	East Stirlingshire	30 July 1980
Rangers	3–1	Partick Thistle	30 July 1980
Falkirk	2–2	Morton	2 August 1980

=== 1st round 2nd leg ===
Home team	Result	Away team	Date
Hearts	3–3	Airdrieonians	6 August 1980
East Stirlingshire	0–3	Kilmarnock	6 August 1980
Partick Thistle	3–2	Rangers	6 August 1980
Morton	5–1	Falkirk	5 August 1980

== Quarter-finals 1st leg ==
Home team	Result	Away team	Date
Airdrieonians	2–4	Bury	9 September 1980
Blackpool	2–1	Kilmarnock	9 September 1980
Notts County	2–0	Morton	16 September 1980
Rangers	1–1	Chesterfield	13 October 1980

== Quarter-finals 2nd leg ==
Home team	Result	Away team	Date
Bury	1–0	Airdrieonians	14 October 1980
Kilmarnock	4–2	Blackpool	14 October 1980
Morton	1–1	Notts County	30 September 1980
Chesterfield	3–0	Rangers	28 October 1980

== Semi-finals 1st leg ==
Home team	Result	Away team	Date
Kilmarnock	1–2	Notts County	4 November 1980
Bury	1–2	Chesterfield	2 December 1980

== Semi-finals 2nd leg ==
Home team	Result	Away team	Date
Notts County	5–2	Kilmarnock	18 November 1980
Chesterfield	1–1	Bury	9 December 1980

== Final 1st leg ==
24 March 1981
19:30 BST

Chesterfield	1–0	Notts County
Moss

Saltergate, Chesterfield
Attendance: 10,190

== Final 2nd leg ==
31 March 1981
19:30 BST

Notts County	1–1 (a.e.t.)	Chesterfield
Masson 73'		Crawford 120'

Meadow Lane, Nottingham
Attendance: 13,000

== Notes and references ==
- "Anglo-Scottish Cup 1980/1981". Football Club History Database.
