= Paul Stevens (English footballer) =

English footballer

Personal information
- Full name: Paul David Stevens
- Date of birth: 4 April 1960
- Place of birth: Bristol, England
- Position: Right back

Youth career
- Bristol Boys

Senior career*
Years	Team	Apps	(Gls)
1978–1985	Bristol City	148	(3)
1985–1990	Bath City		
- * Club domestic league appearances and goals

Paul David Stevens (born 4 April 1960) was an English footballer who played as a right back. He made over 140 Football League appearances in the 1970s and 1980s mostly for Bristol City.

== Career ==
Paul Stevens played locally for Hartcliffe School and Bristol Boys in Bristol. He was signed by manager Alan Dicks as a professional in April 1978 for Bristol City.

Stevens made his debut for Bristol City in the First Division deputising at right back for Gerry Sweeney in a 0–2 defeat at Middlesbrough on 8 April 1978, his only appearance in the 1977–78 season. In 1978–79 with Sweeney ever present at right back, Stevens did not have the opportunity to appear in the first team as Bristol City finished 13th in the First Division. The following season 1979–80 Bristol City finished 20th and were relegated to the Second Division. Stevens played in only one game scoring in a 1–3 defeat in the second leg of the Anglo Scottish Cup at St Mirren on 16 April 1980.

In the Second Division the "Robins" fared badly being in 21st position for most of the season. After a run of only one win in 12 league matches and going six matches without scoring Stevens was introduced at right back when Alan Hay was missing and Sweeney switched to left back. The result was a 1–0 win v Sheffield Wednesday and Stevens retained his place for the remainder of the season although the "Robins" only won two more league games and were relegated to the Third Division. Stevens made 14 appearances in 1980–81.

Stevens was the only ever present player in the tumultuous 1981–82 season when City were relegated for the third successive season this time to the Fourth Division. Stevens made 46 appearances in 1981–82 scoring one goal. The next highest number of appearances was 33 in this worst of all seasons for the "Robins". The one redeeming feature was reaching the FA Cup 4th round where City lost 0–1 to Aston Villa.

Stevens began the first ever campaign in the Fourth Division at right back but after an early run of seven games without a win left Bristol City in 23rd place Stevens was replaced when Rob Newman moved across from left back. Stevens made 10 appearances in 1982–83 as City eventually recovered to a mid table 14th place. Stevens returned in 1983–84 and missed only one game mainly playing at right back as Bristol City won promotion back to the Third Division finishing in 4th place. Stevens made 45+1 appearances scoring two goals including the winner in a 1–0 win v York City.

Stevens made 30 appearances sharing the right back duties with Andy Llewellyn when Bristol City finished 5th in the Third Division in 1984–85.

Stevens joined Bath City on a free transfer in July 1985 from Bristol City. In 1986–87 Stevens played for Bath City v Bristol City in the FA Cup 2nd round which Bristol City won after a replay. Stevens also helped Bath City regain their place in the Football Conference in 1989–90 before a knee injury brought his playing career to an end.

== Honours ==
with Bristol City

- Football League Fourth Division promoted as 4th place: 1983–84
- Anglo Scottish Cup runners up: 1979–80
