= Dennis Peacock =

English footballer

Personal information
- Date of birth: 19 April 1953 (age 73)
- Place of birth: Lincoln, England
- Height: 6 ft 3 in (1.91 m)
- Position: Goalkeeper

Senior career*
Years	Team	Apps	(Gls)
1971–1975	Nottingham Forest	22	(0)
1973	→ Walsall (loan)	10	(0)
1975–1980	Doncaster Rovers	199	(0)
1980–1982	Bolton Wanderers	16	(0)
1982–1986	Doncaster Rovers	130	(0)
1985	→ Burnley (loan)	8	(0)
Total		385	(0)
- * Club domestic league appearances and goals

Dennis Peacock (born 19 April 1953) is an English retired professional footballer who played as a goalkeeper. He played for Nottingham Forest from 1971 until 1975.
