= Neil Martin =

Scottish footballer and manager

Personal information
- Full name: Neil Martin
- Date of birth: 20 October 1940 (age 86)
- Place of birth: Tranent, East Lothian, Scotland
- Height: 6 ft 0 in (1.83 m)
- Position: Forward

Senior career*
Years	Team	Apps	(Gls)
1959–1961	Alloa Athletic	48	(25)
1961–1963	Queen of the South	61	(33)
1963–1965	Hibernian	65	(53)
1965–1968	Sunderland	86	(38)
1967	→ Vancouver Royals (loan)	11	(1)
1968–1971	Coventry City	106	(40)
1971–1975	Nottingham Forest	119	(28)
1975–1976	Brighton & Hove Albion	17	(8)
1976	Crystal Palace	9	(1)
1976	→ San Antonio Thunder (loan)	19	(5)
1976–1978	St Patrick's Athletic	14	(5)
Total		555	(237)

International career
1964	Scottish Football League XI	2	(1)
1965	Scotland	3	(0)

Managerial career
- 1981–1982: Walsall (joint with Alan Buckley)
- * Club domestic league appearances and goals

Neil Martin (born 20 October 1940) is a Scottish former football player, who scored 100 league goals in both Scotland and England and won three full international caps for Scotland in the 1960s and 1970s. Known for his strength, power, bravery and commitment, Martin scored consistently while playing for several clubs. He played for Alloa Athletic, Queen of the South, Hibernian, Sunderland, Coventry City, Nottingham Forest, Brighton & Hove Albion and Crystal Palace.

== Domestic career ==
=== Alloa Athletic ===
Neil Martin began his senior football career at Alloa Athletic in Central Scotland. In 1960–61 Neil Martin scored 25 league and cup goals. This helped take Alloa as far as they have ever been on a Scottish Cup run (to the quarter finals). At that stage they were knocked out by a Dunfermline Athletic side at the beginning of their golden decade; Jock Stein would manage the Pars to victory in that season's Scottish Cup and to the next season's last eight of the European Cup Winners Cup.

Martin's feats attracted suitors and at the end of the season he was on his way South.

=== Queen of the South ===
In 1961 Neil Martin followed in the footsteps of Irish international Laurie Cumming by joining Dumfries side Queen of the South after leaving Alloa. For Martin there was a £2,000 transfer fee. George Farm had been at Blackpool since 1948 and was goalkeeper through the tangerines' 1950s golden era (this included winning the 1953 'Matthews' FA Cup Final alongside Stanley Matthews and Stan Mortensen). In his second season at Queens he was now player manager (Farm went on to make over 100 league appearances for Queen of the South, as player-manager for three of his four years there). Also at the club was Jim Patterson (251 strikes for the club make Jim Patterson the all time goals king of Queens). And arriving shortly before Martin was Ernie Hannigan (with Martin as his chief accomplice Hannigan would later say, "Going to Queen of the South turned out to be a great move").

Fast and tricky right winger Hannigan would form an outstanding partnership with Martin. In 1961/62 Queens were promoted back to the top division as division 2 runners up. Martin was on the score sheet 30 times in league and cup. In Martin's second season at Palmerston Park Queens retained their top-flight status.

Teammate Iain McChesney in an interview included, "A big gem" in his description of Neil Martin.

=== Hibernian ===
In 1963 Hibs battling to come out of a slump paid £7,500 for Neil Martin to play for the team he supported as a boy. Martin's goals helped add impetus to the club. Jock Stein became manager in 1964 and the up turn was instantaneous. Martin scored 29 league and cup goals. Hibs finished fourth in the 1964–65 league season (curiously ahead of both halves of the Old Firm) and knocked out Rangers on the way to the Scottish Cup semi finals (again Dunfermline would prove Martin's nemesis in this competition). Hibs played Real Madrid in a challenge match at Easter Road and handed their guests a 2–0 defeat.

Mercilessly against ex club Alloa he scored four goals in an 11–2 League Cup thrashing. He also hit four in a first division game against his other former side, Queen of the South. Martin was at Hibs in their Fairs Cup first round exit to Valencia. Hibs won 2–0 at home, but a defeat by the same margin in Spain meant a play-off, which Hibs lost 3–0.

=== Sunderland ===
£45,000 was the latest transfer fee for the seemingly fearless forward to a club with Jim Baxter on the playing staff. Sunderland kept away from relegation during Neil Martin's time at the club. His effectiveness was reduced by the club being unable to pair him with the right kind of strike partner. Nick Sharkey was maybe his best at Roker Park but departed early in season 1966–67. Sharkey was replaced by the willing but unprolific John O'Hare. Martin was never paired there with a nippy poacher able to feed off a brawny centre forward. So Martin remained primarily a goalscorer.

In 1967 Martin was involved in a game that now has some infamy as being a game with alleged referee bribing by Leeds manager Don Revie. After two draws (with Martin scoring in the first game) a second replay went ahead at Boothferry Park in Hull. With scores level yet again and the clocking ticking down the Leeds bench are alleged to have given orders for their next player near the Sunderland penalty area to take a dive. That man was Jimmy Greenhoff who elaborately went over hitting the deck close to the edge of the box. Whistle, penalty, goal – game over.

After three seasons in the top tier Martin moved again in 1968.

=== Coventry City ===
Coventry (where he would be re-united with Ernie Hannigan from their successful partnership at Queen of the South) splashed £90,000 for the battling Scot during a relegation battle. Neil Martin replaced Bobby Gould and by the season's end had equalled Gould as joint top goal getter for the season with eight. Coventry survived their first season of top-flight football.

A couple of mobile, smaller strikers benefited from their partnership with Martin, namely Ernie Hunt and John O'Rourke. After another relegation battle in 1968–69 things improved significantly. With Martin and O'Rourke up front and youngsters Willie Carr and Dennis Mortimer in midfield Coventry achieved a European spot by finishing sixth.

After scoring against Trakia Plovdiv before being knocked out of Europe by Bayern Munich, the 30-year-old was on the move again.

=== Nottingham Forest ===
Although Neil Martin only contributed one goal in what was left of that season the club stayed up benefiting from the Scot's experienced presence. With injuries starting to niggle Martin, Forest were relegated at the end of the 1971–72 season. Martin's days of top-flight football were over.

1972–73 season was a disappointment with Forest never threatening a promotion challenge and Martin picking up an injury pre-season against Kaiserslautern – he would miss three months. Martin hit the net on his come back in a 2–1 victory at Sheffield Wednesday but the season was undistinguished.

Under fellow Scot Allan Brown the next season saw some improvement. Martin kept away from injury and acted as foil to Duncan McKenzie who hit 26 goals as the division's top scorer that season.

In the FA Cup Martin scored twice in sweeping aside Bristol Rovers in the third round. Martin then played his part as Manchester City were on the end of a tremendous 4–1 thumping. After seeing off Portsmouth, Forest were away to Newcastle United in the sixth round. Forest were looking good as they went 3–1 up against a 10 men Newcastle. Newcastle fans invaded the pitch. After the restart the roof fell in on Forest – they lost 4–3. The FA declared a replay at neutral Goodison Park. After a no score draw Newcastle went through 1–0 when they replayed on Merseyside again.

In 1974–75, in good form Martin scored twice winning in 3–2 at Sheffield Wednesday in late September, and so scored 100 league goals in each of Scotland and England. In scoring the 1–0 winner in the FA Cup third round replay at Tottenham Hotspur in the first game at the club of manager Brian Clough, so Neil Martin has the distinction of scoring the first goal of Clough's reign at Forest.

=== Brighton & Hove Albion ===
Neil Martin in his mid 30s joined third division Brighton scoring a debut goal against Rotherham United. He scored two more at Sheffield Wednesday (yet again) this time in a draw. Despite things seeming to go well at the Seagulls, Brighton signed Sammy Morgan and Martin was reduced to a peripheral figure.

=== Crystal Palace ===
In March Neil Martin left one promotion chase for another signing for Crystal Palace but only scored once for the Eagles when drawing with Halifax Town. The Palace promotion challenged petered out (Brighton also lost out).

=== St Patrick's Athletic ===
Barry Bridges signed Martin in 1976 and he stayed at Richmond Park for two seasons.

=== After playing ===
After hanging up his boots Neil Martin stayed in the game as a coach and in the early 1980s was installed as joint manager at Walsall alongside existing manager Alan Buckley. Initially the duo were successful and had the team challenging for promotion to the Second Division by Christmas of 1981. At the turn of the year, however, Buckley was removed from the coaching staff, with Martin given sole control over team selection. Walsall's form collapsed dramatically after this, and only a last-day draw with Doncaster Rovers prevented relegation to the Fourth Division. After the season ended, Martin left the club, and Buckley was re-instated as manager.

Martin still takes an active interest in football; in March 2007, Martin attended a game involving two of his former clubs, Queen of the South against Hibs in a Scottish Cup quarter final at Palmerston Park. Martin has also returned to Coventry City FC on Former Player Celebration days in recent years.

== International career ==
Martin played once for Scotland at U-23 level and twice for the Scottish Football League XI, scoring at Roker Park in a 2–2 draw against the Football League. At the end of the 1964–65 season Scotland played two away World Cup qualifiers. Martin made his debut partnering a scoring Denis Law in a 1–1 draw in Poland, and again paired with Law in a 2–1 victory in Finland.

Martin won his third and yet again unbeaten final cap after his move to Sunderland (all three caps were awarded in 1965). Martin partnered Alan Gilzean in the 1–0 victory over Italy at Hampden Park with a late winner from John Greig. He also had 4 children, one of them was called Yvonne and had two children Callum and Scarlett, another called Craig who had one child called Lily and Martin's other children have yet to have children.

#	Date	Opponent	Result	Competition
1	23 May 1965	Poland	Poland 1–1 Scotland	FIFA World Cup qualifier
2	27 May 1965	Finland	Finland 1–2 Scotland	FIFA World Cup qualifier
3	9 November 1965	Italy	Scotland 1–0 Italy	FIFA World Cup qualifier
