= 1974–75 Texaco Cup =

Tournament details
- Country: England; Scotland
- Teams: 20

Final positions
- Champions: Newcastle United
- Runners-up: Southampton

The 1974–75 Texaco Cup was the fifth and last edition of the tournament sponsored by Texaco. It was won by Newcastle United, who beat Southampton in a two-legged final by 3–1 on aggregate.

== Group stage ==
=== Group A ===
| Home team | Result | Away team | Date |
|---|---|---|---|
| Norwich City | 2–1 | Peterborough United | 3 August 1974 |
| West Bromwich Albion | 0–0 | Birmingham City | 3 August 1974 |
| West Bromwich Albion | 5–1 | Norwich City | 6 August 1974 |
| Peterborough United | 1–1 | Birmingham City | 7 August 1974 |
| Birmingham City | 3–1 | Norwich City | 10 August 1974 |
| Peterborough United | 2–1 | West Bromwich Albion | 10 August 1974 |

| Team | Pld | W | D | L | GF | GA | GD | BP | Pts |
|---|---|---|---|---|---|---|---|---|---|
| Birmingham City | 3 | 1 | 2 | 0 | 4 | 2 | +2 | 1 | 5 |
| West Bromwich Albion | 3 | 1 | 1 | 1 | 6 | 3 | +4 | 1 | 4 |
| Peterborough United | 3 | 1 | 1 | 1 | 4 | 4 | 0 | 0 | 3 |
| Norwich City | 3 | 1 | 0 | 2 | 4 | 9 | -5 | 0 | 2 |

=== Group B ===
| Home team | Result | Away team | Date |
|---|---|---|---|
| Luton Town | 1–1 | Southampton | 3 August 1974 |
| West Ham United | 1–0 | Orient | 3 August 1974 |
| Southampton | 2–1 | Orient | 6 August 1974 |
| West Ham United | 1–2 | Luton Town | 7 August 1974 |
| Orient | 2–2 | Luton Town | 10 August 1974 |
| Southampton | 2–0 | West Ham United | 10 August 1974 |

| Team | Pld | W | D | L | GF | GA | GD | BP | Pts |
|---|---|---|---|---|---|---|---|---|---|
| Southampton | 3 | 2 | 1 | 0 | 5 | 2 | +3 | 0 | 5 |
| Luton Town | 3 | 1 | 2 | 0 | 5 | 4 | +1 | 0 | 4 |
| West Ham United | 3 | 1 | 0 | 2 | 2 | 4 | -2 | 0 | 2 |
| Orient | 3 | 0 | 1 | 2 | 3 | 5 | -2 | 0 | 1 |

=== Group C ===
| Home team | Result | Away team | Date |
|---|---|---|---|
| Blackpool | 1–1 | Manchester City | 3 August 1974 |
| Oldham Athletic | 4–0 | Sheffield United | 3 August 1974 |
| Blackpool | 1–2 | Oldham Athletic | 6 August 1974 |
| Sheffield United | 4–2 | Manchester City | 6 August 1974 |
| Manchester City | 2–1 | Oldham Athletic | 10 August 1974 |
| Sheffield United | 1–2 | Blackpool | 10 August 1974 |

| Team | Pld | W | D | L | GF | GA | GD | BP | Pts |
|---|---|---|---|---|---|---|---|---|---|
| Oldham Athletic | 3 | 2 | 0 | 1 | 7 | 2 | +5 | 1 | 5 |
| Blackpool | 3 | 1 | 1 | 1 | 4 | 3 | +1 | 0 | 3 |
| Manchester City | 3 | 1 | 1 | 1 | 5 | 6 | -1 | 0 | 3 |
| Sheffield United | 3 | 1 | 0 | 2 | 5 | 5 | 0 | 1 | 3 |

=== Group D ===
| Home team | Result | Away team | Date |
|---|---|---|---|
| Middlesbrough | 0–1 | Carlisle United | 3 August 1974 |
| Sunderland | 2–1 | Newcastle United | 3 August 1974 |
| Carlisle United | 2–2 | Newcastle United | 6 August 1974 |
| Sunderland | 0–1 | Middlesbrough | 6 August 1974 |
| Carlisle United | 0–0 | Sunderland | 10 August 1974 |
| Newcastle United | 4–0 | Middlesbrough | 10 August 1974 |

| Team | Pld | W | D | L | GF | GA | GD | BP | Pts |
|---|---|---|---|---|---|---|---|---|---|
| Newcastle United | 3 | 1 | 1 | 1 | 7 | 4 | +3 | 1 | 4 |
| Carlisle United | 3 | 1 | 2 | 0 | 3 | 2 | +1 | 0 | 4 |
| Sunderland | 3 | 1 | 1 | 1 | 2 | 2 | 0 | 0 | 3 |
| Middlesbrough | 3 | 1 | 0 | 2 | 1 | 5 | -4 | 0 | 2 |

== Quarter-finals ==
=== 1st leg ===
| Home team | Result | Away team | Date |
|---|---|---|---|
| Birmingham City | 3–0 | Ayr United | 17 September 1974 |
| Oldham Athletic | 1–0 | Hearts | 17 September 1974 |
| Aberdeen | 1–1 | Newcastle United | 18 September 1974 |
| Rangers | 1–3 | Southampton | 18 September 1974 |

=== 2nd leg ===
| Home team | Result | Away team | Date |
|---|---|---|---|
| Hearts | 1–1 | Oldham Athletic | 30 September 1974 |
| Southampton | 2–0 | Rangers | 1 October 1974 |
| Ayr United | 0–0 | Birmingham City | 2 October 1974 |
| Newcastle United | 3–2 | Aberdeen | 2 October 1974 |

== Semi-finals ==
=== 1st leg ===
| Home team | Result | Away team | Date |
|---|---|---|---|
| Oldham Athletic | 1–3 | Southampton | 22 October 1974 |
| Newcastle United | 1–1 | Birmingham City | 23 October 1974 |

=== 2nd leg ===
| Home team | Result | Away team | Date |
|---|---|---|---|
| Southampton | 2–1 | Oldham Athletic | 5 November 1974 |
| Birmingham City | 1–4 | Newcastle United | 6 November 1974 |

== Final ==
=== 1st leg ===
27 November 1974
19:30 BST

| Southampton | 1 – 0 | Newcastle United |

The Dell, Southampton
Attendance: 17,100

=== 2nd leg ===
11 December 1974
19:30 BST

| Newcastle United | 3 – 0 (a.e.t.) | Southampton |

St James' Park, Newcastle Upon-Tyne
Attendance: 19,288
