= 1979–80 Anglo-Scottish Cup =

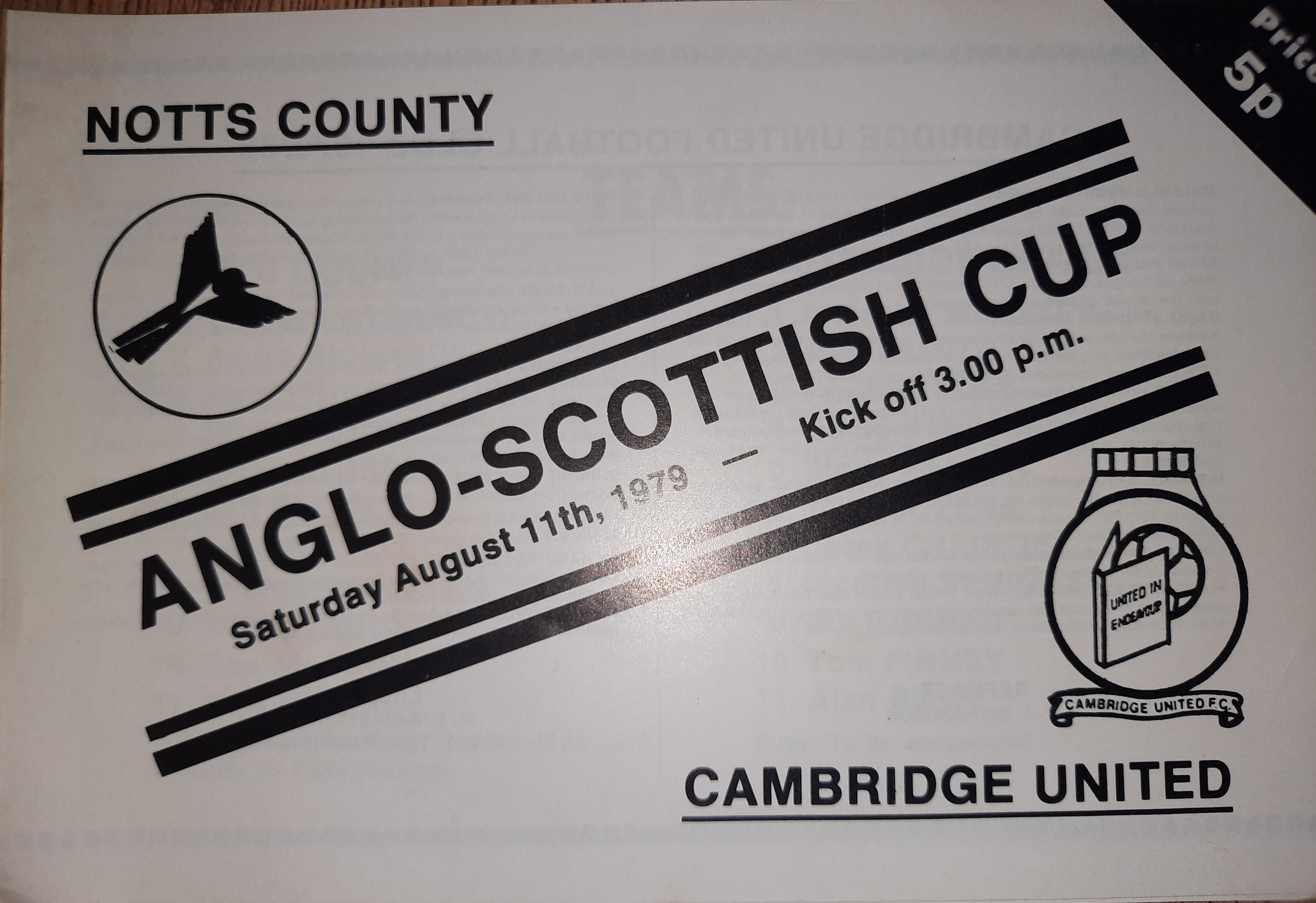
- Programme for the 1979-80 Anglo-Scottish Cup Group C tie between Notts County and Cambridge United

Tournament details
- Country: England; Scotland
- Teams: 24

Final positions
- Champions: St Mirren
- Runners-up: Bristol City

The 1979–80 Anglo-Scottish Cup was the fifth edition of the tournament. It was won by St Mirren, who beat Bristol City in a two-legged final by 5–1 on aggregate and by becoming the only Scottish side to win the trophy.

== English group ==
=== Group A ===
Home team	Result	Away team	Date
Blackpool	2–2	Blackburn Rovers	1 August 1979
Blackburn Rovers	2–2	Burnley	4 August 1979
Preston North End	3–1	Blackpool	4 August 1979?
Blackburn Rovers	1–1	Preston North End	7 August 1979
Blackpool	3–2	Burnley	7 August 1979
Burnley	1–2	Preston North End	11 August 1979

Team	Pld	W	D	L	GF	GA	GD	BP	Pts
Preston North End	3	2	1	0	6	3	+3	1	6
Blackburn Rovers	3	0	3	0	5	5	0	0	3
Blackpool	3	1	1	1	6	7	-1	0	3
Burnley	3	0	1	2	5	7	-2	0	1

=== Group B ===
Home team	Result	Away team	Date
Bolton Wanderers	2–2	Bury	2 August 1979
Bury	4–2	Sunderland	4 August 1979
Oldham Athletic	1–3	Bolton Wanderers	4 August 1979
Bolton Wanderers	2–0	Sunderland	7 August 1979
Bury	1–2	Oldham Athletic	7 August 1979
Sunderland	1–2	Oldham Athletic	11 August 1979

Team	Pld	W	D	L	GF	GA	GD	BP	Pts
Bolton Wanderers	3	2	1	0	7	3	+4	1	6
Bury	3	1	1	1	7	6	+1	1	4
Oldham Athletic	3	2	0	1	5	5	0	0	4
Sunderland	3	0	0	3	3	8	-5	0	0

=== Group C ===
Home team	Result	Away team	Date
Sheffield United	1–0	Mansfield Town	29 July 1980
Cambridge United	0–1	Sheffield United	4 August 1979?
Mansfield Town	0–1	Notts County	4 August 1979
Notts County	0–1	Sheffield United	7 August 1979
Cambridge United	1–1	Mansfield Town	8 August 1979
Notts County	1–3	Cambridge United	11 August 1979

Team	Pld	W	D	L	GF	GA	GD	BP	Pts
Sheffield United	3	3	0	0	3	0	+3	0	6
Cambridge United	3	1	1	1	4	3	+1	1	4
Notts County	3	1	0	2	2	4	-2	0	2
Mansfield Town	3	0	1	2	1	3	-2	0	1

=== Group D ===
Home team	Result	Away team	Date
Birmingham City	0–4	Bristol City	4 August 1979
Fulham	1–0	Plymouth Argyle	4 August 1979
Plymouth Argyle	1–1	Birmingham City	6 August 1979
Fulham	0–5	Birmingham City	8 August 1979
Plymouth Argyle	0–0	Bristol City	8 August 1979
Bristol City	1–0	Fulham	11 August 1979

Team	Pld	W	D	L	GF	GA	GD	BP	Pts
Bristol City	3	2	1	0	5	0	+5	1	6
Birmingham City	3	1	1	1	6	5	+1	1	4
Plymouth Argyle	3	0	2	1	1	2	-1	0	2
Fulham	3	1	0	2	1	6	-5	0	2

== Scottish group ==
=== 1st round 1st leg ===
Home team	Result	Away team	Date
St Mirren	3–3	Hibernian	28 July 1979
Partick Thistle	1–1	Dunfermline Athletic	1 August 1979
Berwick Rangers	0–4	Morton	5 August 1979
Dundee	1–1	Kilmarnock	6 August 1979

=== 1st round 2nd leg ===
Home team	Result	Away team	Date
Hibernian	0–1	St Mirren	1 August 1979
Dunfermline Athletic	0–1	Partick Thistle	7 August 1979
Morton	4–1	Berwick Rangers	7 August 1979
Kilmarnock	3–3	Dundee	8 August 1979

== Quarter-finals 1st leg ==
Home team	Result	Away team	Date
Sheffield United	2–1	Dundee	4 September 1979
Partick Thistle	1–1	Bristol City	18 September 1979
Preston North End	1–3	Morton	18 September 1979
St Mirren	4–2	Bolton Wanderers	19 September 1979

== Quarter-finals 2nd leg ==
Home team	Result	Away team	Date
Dundee	0–1	Sheffield United	11 September 1979
Bolton Wanderers	2–1	St Mirren	2 October 1979
Morton	2–0	Preston North End	3 October 1979
Bristol City	2–0	Partick Thistle	23 October 1979

== Semi-finals 1st leg ==
Home team	Result	Away team	Date
Sheffield United	0–0	St Mirren	30 October 1979
Bristol City	2–2	Morton	6 November 1979

== Semi-finals 2nd leg ==
Home team	Result	Away team	Date
St Mirren	4–0	Sheffield United	3 December 1979
Morton	0–1	Bristol City	15 January 1980

== Final 1st leg ==
25 March 1980
19:30 BST

Bristol City	0 – 2	St Mirren
		Stark

Aston Gate, Bristol
Attendance: 10,190

== Final 2nd leg ==
16 April 1980
19:30 BST

St Mirren	3 – 1	Bristol City
Somner, Logan		Stevens

St Mirren Park, Love Street, Paisley
Attendance: 13,000

== Notes and references ==
- "Anglo-Scottish Cup 1979/1980". Football Club History Database.
