= Sean Dyche =

English football manager (born 1971)

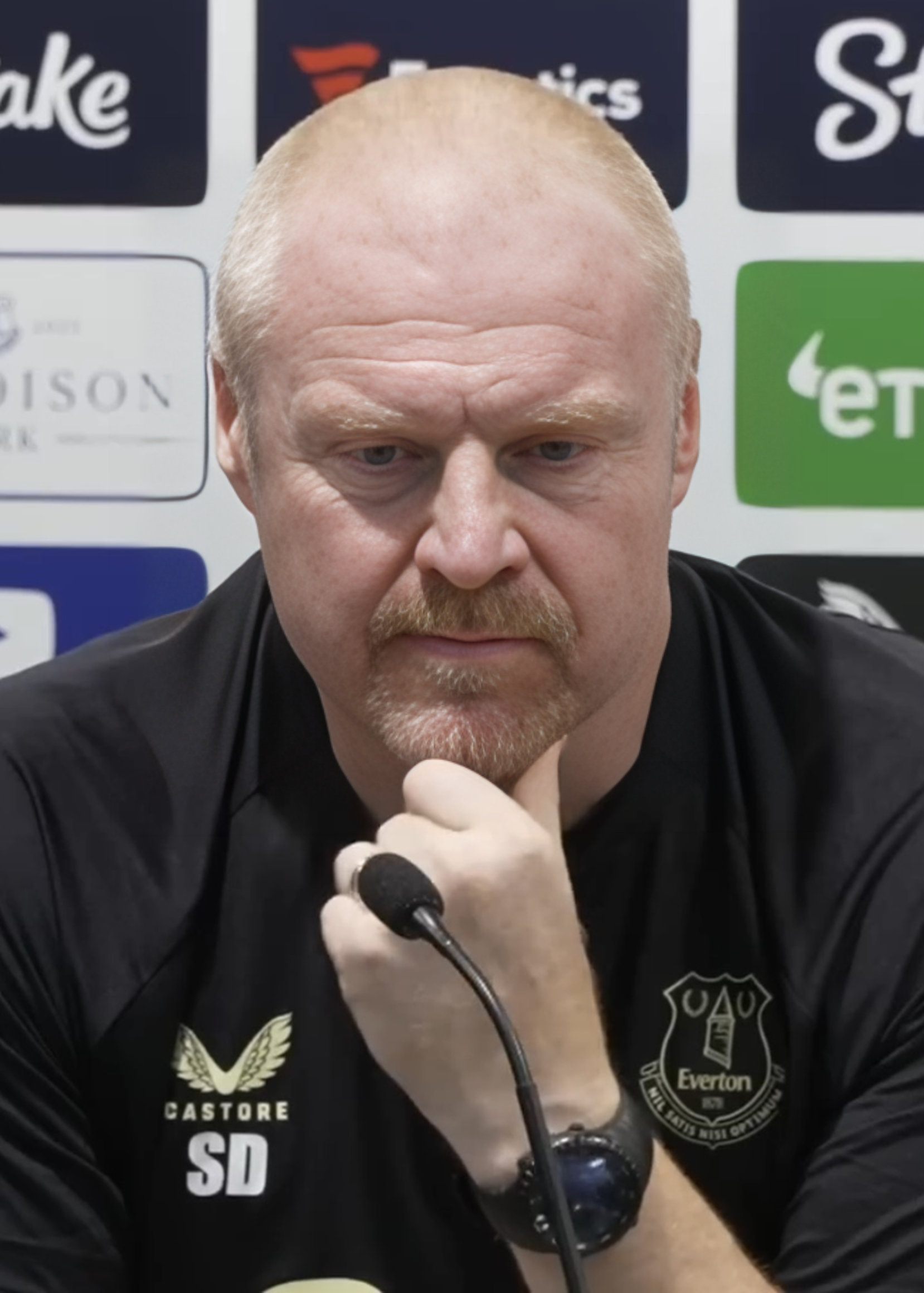
- Dyche in 2024

Personal information
- Full name: Sean Mark Dyche
- Date of birth: 28 June 1971 (age 55)
- Place of birth: Kettering, England
- Height: 6 ft 0 in (1.83 m)
- Position: Centre-back

Youth career
- 1987–1989: Nottingham Forest

Senior career*
Years	Team	Apps	(Gls)
1989–1990	Nottingham Forest	0	(0)
1990–1997	Chesterfield	231	(8)
1997–1999	Bristol City	17	(0)
1999	→ Luton Town (loan)	14	(1)
1999–2002	Millwall	69	(3)
2002–2005	Watford	72	(0)
2005–2007	Northampton Town	56	(0)
Total		459	(12)

Managerial career
- 2011–2012: Watford
- 2012–2022: Burnley
- 2023–2025: Everton
- 2025–2026: Nottingham Forest
- * Club domestic league appearances and goals

Sean Mark Dyche (/daɪtʃ/; born 28 June 1971) is an English professional football manager and former footballer who was most recently the head coach of Premier League club Nottingham Forest.

During his playing career, Dyche played as a centre-back, making his professional debut in 1990 and representing Chesterfield – whom he captained and scored for in an FA Cup semi-final. He also played for Bristol City, Luton Town, Millwall, Watford and Northampton Town. He was promoted with three of his six clubs. After retiring as a player in 2007, he coached at Watford, including a stint as manager between June 2011 and July 2012.

After leaving Watford, Dyche became the manager of Burnley in October 2012. He guided the club to two promotions to the Premier League, in 2013–14 and 2015–16. During the 2017–18 season, he led Burnley to their first European campaign since 1967, following a seventh-place league finish. Dyche became the longest-serving manager in the Premier League at the end of the 2019–20 season. He was dismissed by Burnley in April 2022, when the club was in the relegation zone. Dyche was appointed manager of Everton in January 2023, and was dismissed two years later. In October 2025, he was appointed manager of Nottingham Forest, and was sacked in February 2026 after less than four months in charge.

== Playing career ==
Dyche was a youth-team player at Nottingham Forest in the late 1980s, while Brian Clough was manager. When he joined Forest he was 5 ft 8 in (1.73 m) and weighed 10 stone (64 kg; 140 lb) but grew to 6 ft 0 in (1.83 m) and 12 stone (76 kg; 168 lb) after a year. He injured his leg early in his career, which Dyche said held him back. It also left him with a permanent bend in his leg. Dyche was present at the Hillsborough disaster, having travelled to the stadium as part of the Forest youth side.

He left Forest in early 1990 without making a first-team appearance, and signed for Chesterfield, where he later became captain. Dyche was part of the team that reached the FA Cup semi-finals in 1997. In the FA Cup semi-final against Middlesbrough, he scored a penalty to put his side 2–0 up in an eventual 3–3 draw. Chesterfield lost the replay 3–0.

Dyche left Chesterfield for Bristol City in 1997, helping them win promotion to Division One in his first season. City were relegated the following season, during which Dyche spent time on loan at Luton Town. He moved to Millwall for £150,000 in 1999, but only played once in his first season due to a back injury. He won promotion to Division One in 2001 and came close to a Premier League place the following year, losing to eventual promotion winners Birmingham City in the play-off semi-finals.

In July 2002, Watford manager Ray Lewington signed Dyche within 24 hours of his appointment. Two years later, Dyche was named captain as Neil Cox did not want the responsibility in his final year at the club.

Dyche signed for Northampton Town in 2005, and was involved in their 2005–06 promotion from League Two. He was released at the end of the 2006–07 season, aged 35.

== Managerial career ==
=== Watford ===
Having retired, following his release from Northampton, Dyche re-joined Watford as under-18s coach in 2007, and was promoted to assistant manager in July 2009 when Malky Mackay was appointed Watford manager. Mackay left to join Cardiff City in June 2011, and Dyche was promoted to manager. Watford finished the 2011–12 season in eleventh place in the Football League Championship, the club's best finish for four years, but a change in club ownership led to his dismissal at the end of the season.

=== Burnley ===
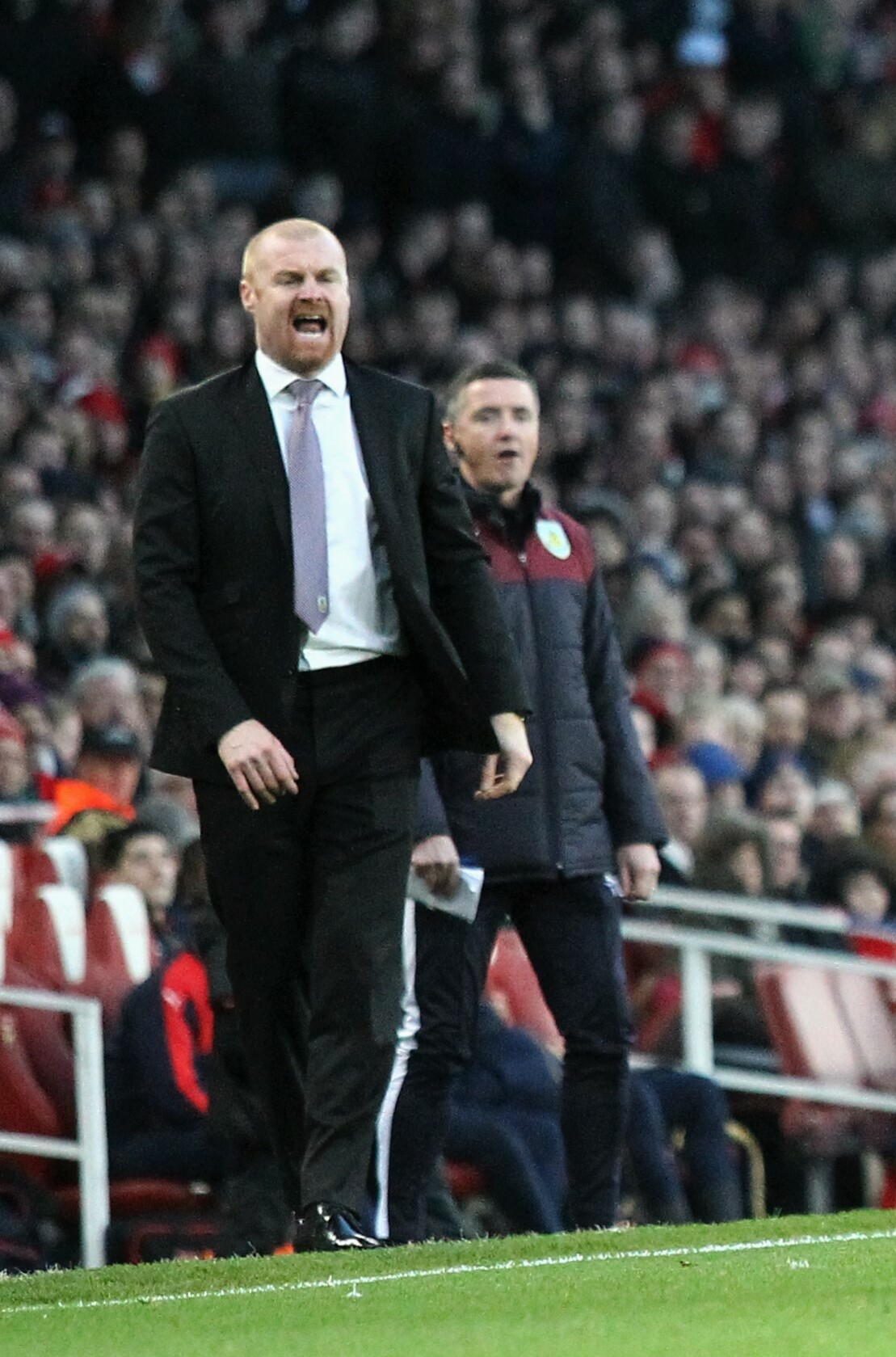
Dyche coaching Burnley in 2016

Dyche joined the England national under-21 football team as a temporary member of the backroom staff in September 2012, but the following month became manager of Burnley, succeeding Eddie Howe, who had left the club to rejoin Bournemouth. Before the start of the 2013–14 campaign, Burnley were tipped as relegation candidates by the bookies; Dyche had to work with a tight budget and a small squad, and Burnley's top goal scorer from the previous season, Charlie Austin, had moved to Championship rivals Queens Park Rangers. In Dyche's first full season in charge, however, Burnley finished second and were promoted back to the Premier League. The new strike partnership of Danny Ings and Sam Vokes had 41 league goals between them. Dyche used only 23 players during the season, which was the joint-lowest in the division, and had paid only one transfer fee – £400,000 for striker Ashley Barnes. Burnley's spell in the top flight lasted only a single season, as they were relegated with two games to spare. The following season, Burnley won the Championship title when they equalled their 2013–14 tally of 93 points and ended the season with a run of 23 undefeated league games.

Burnley finished the 2016–17 season in 16th place, six points above the relegation zone, and were guaranteed to play consecutive seasons in the top flight for the first time in the Premier League era. During 2017, the club's new Barnfield Training Centre was completed and replaced the 60-year-old Gawthorpe. Dyche was involved in the design and had willingly tailored his transfer spending as he and the board focused on the club's infrastructure and future. In January 2018, Dyche signed a new contract with Burnley to remain as manager until the summer of 2022. He had guided Burnley to seventh place in the Premier League at the time of signing his contract. The season ended with UEFA Europa League qualification for the first time for over half a century, securing their best finish to a top flight season since a sixth-placed finish in 1973–74. Following qualification for European football, "The Princess Royal" pub in Burnley was renamed "The Royal Dyche" in honour of him. Burnley were eliminated in the play-off round by Greek side Olympiacos after the side had defeated Scottish club Aberdeen and Turkish team İstanbul Başakşehir in the previous qualifying rounds.

The 2019–20 season was interrupted for three months because of the COVID-19 pandemic before being completed behind closed doors; Burnley concluded the campaign in 10th place, five points below the European qualification places. On 15 April 2022, Dyche was dismissed by Burnley after being with the club for nine and a half years. At the time of his dismissal, the club was in the relegation zone, four points behind Everton with eight games remaining. The decision to dismiss Dyche by the club's owners was widely criticised, with BBC writer Phil McNulty describing it as "blind panic" in their attempt to retain their Premier League status by appointing a new manager. Mike Jackson succeeded Dyche as caretaker manager for the rest of the season, with Burnley relegated after finishing in 18th on the final day of the season.

=== Everton ===
On 30 January 2023, Dyche was appointed manager of Premier League club Everton on a two-and-a-half-year contract, replacing Frank Lampard. In his first game in charge on 4 February, Everton defeated league leaders Arsenal 1–0.

Dyche took his team into the final day of the season on 28 May 2023, with Everton holding a two-point lead in 17th over fellow relegation rivals Leicester City and Leeds United. Everton went on to win their final match 1–0 against Bournemouth, which successfully retained their Premier League status.

On 24 April 2024, Dyche's Everton team defeated Liverpool 2–0 in the Merseyside derby with goals from Jarrad Branthwaite and Dominic Calvert-Lewin. This was Everton's first home win at Goodison Park against Liverpool since 2010. He was the Premier League Manager of the Month for April 2024 after taking 13 points from a possible 18, including four consecutive home wins without conceding a goal. Everton avoided relegation with three games remaining, despite an eight-point deduction for historical UEFA Financial Fair Play Regulations breaches; Dyche said that working alongside these sanctions was "very taxing, very tiring".

On 9 January 2025, Dyche was dismissed by Everton, three hours before an FA Cup third round home tie with Peterborough United. By the time of his dismissal, Everton were only one point above the relegation zone, having only won three of their last nineteen games in the 2024–25 season. Everton appointed David Moyes as his replacement.

=== Nottingham Forest ===
On 21 October 2025, Dyche was appointed as manager of Nottingham Forest, replacing Ange Postecoglou on a contract running until 2027. Two days later, he managed his first match, securing a 2–0 win over Porto in the Europa League. On 12 February 2026, Dyche was dismissed following a scoreless home draw against Wolverhampton Wanderers, who were bottom of the table in the Premier League. Dyche left the club 17th in the table, having won six of his 18 Premier League games in charge.

== Personal life ==
Dyche was born in Kettering, Northamptonshire. He grew up as an admirer of Liverpool, but was a Kettering Town supporter. His father was a management consultant at British Steel Corporation, working in Egypt, India, and Corby. He has two brothers. Dyche and his wife Jane have two children. Dyche's son, Max, plays professional football for Northampton Town.

Dyche is well known for his distinctive gravelly voice.

Dyche features in an internet meme criticising modern trends in football, in which the phrase "utter woke nonsense" is attributed to him; he said "I wish I'd copyrighted it. Considering I didn't actually say it, it does follow me around".

Dyche is an avid music fan. He starred in the music videos for the Blossoms songs "What Can I Say After I'm Sorry?" & "Gary", portraying the role of a crime boss.

== Career statistics ==
Appearances and goals by club, season and competition
Club	Season	League			FA Cup		League Cup		Other		Total	
Club	Season	Division	Apps	Goals	Apps	Goals	Apps	Goals	Apps	Goals	Apps	Goals
Chesterfield	1989–90	Fourth Division	22	2	—		—		3 (Note: Appearances in Fourth Division play-offs)	0	25	2
Chesterfield	1990–91	Fourth Division	28	2	1	0	1	0	2 (Note: Appearance(s) in Associate Members' Cup)	0	32	2
Chesterfield	1991–92	Fourth Division	42	3	1	0	2	0	1	0	46	3
Chesterfield	1992–93	Third Division	20	1	0	0	0	0	2 (Note: Appearance(s) in Football League Trophy)	0	22	1
Chesterfield	1993–94	Third Division	20	0	1	0	2	0	2	0	25	0
Chesterfield	1994–95	Third Division	22	0	2	0	0	0	3	0	27	0
Chesterfield	1995–96	Second Division	41	0	2	0	2	0	3	0	48	0
Chesterfield	1996–97	Second Division	36	0	6	1	2	0	0	0	44	1
Chesterfield	Total		231	8	13	1	9	0	16	0	269	9
Bristol City	1997–98	Second Division	11	0	0	0	1	0	0	0	12	0
Bristol City	1998–99	First Division	6	0	0	0	2	0	—		8	0
Bristol City	Total		17	0	0	0	3	0	0	0	20	0
Luton Town (loan)	1998–99	Second Division	14	1	—		—		1	0	15	1
Millwall	1999–2000	Second Division	1	0	0	0	0	0	0	0	1	0
Millwall	2000–01	Second Division	33	0	2	0	1	0	0	0	36	0
Millwall	2001–02	First Division	35	3	2	0	2	0	—		39	3
Millwall	Total		69	3	4	0	3	0	0	0	76	3
Watford	2002–03	First Division	24	0	0	0	1	0	—		25	0
Watford	2003–04	First Division	25	0	1	0	1	0	—		27	0
Watford	2004–05	Championship	23	0	0	0	3	0	—		26	0
Watford	Total		72	0	1	0	5	0	—		78	0
Northampton Town	2005–06	League Two	35	0	1	0	2	0	0	0	38	0
Northampton Town	2006–07	League One	21	0	2	0	1	0	0	0	24	0
Northampton Town	Total		56	0	3	0	3	0	0	0	62	0
Career total			459	12	21	1	23	0	17	0	520	13

== Managerial statistics ==
As of 12 February 2026

Managerial record by team and tenure
Team	From	To	Record				
Team	From	To	P	W	D	L	Win %
Watford	21 June 2011	6 July 2012	49	17	17	15	34.69
Burnley	30 October 2012	15 April 2022	425	149	118	158	35.06
Everton	30 January 2023	9 January 2025 (Note: Dyche was dismissed by Everton on 9 January 2025, and Soccerbase erroneously include Everton's match later the same day in their managerial statistics for Dyche. The match, a 2–0 win for Everton over Peterborough United, was taken by caretaker managers Leighton Baines and Séamus Coleman.)	84	26	26	32	30.95
Nottingham Forest	21 October 2025	12 February 2026	25	10	6	9	40.00
Career total			583	202	167	214	34.65

== Honours ==
=== Player ===
Millwall

- Football League Second Division: 2000–01

=== Manager ===
Burnley

- Football League Championship: 2015–16; second-place promotion: 2013–14

Individual

- Premier League Manager of the Month: March 2018, February 2020, April 2024
- Football League Championship Manager of the Month: September 2013, October 2013, April 2014, February 2016
