= 1973–74 Texaco Cup =

Tournament details
- Country: England; Scotland
- Teams: 16

Final positions
- Champions: Newcastle United
- Runners-up: Burnley

The 1973–74 Texaco Cup was the fourth edition of the tournament sponsored by Texaco. It was won by Newcastle United, who beat Burnley 2–1 in the only match in the final this season.

== First round 1st leg ==
Home team	Result	Away team	Date
Burnley	7–0	East Fife	18 September 1973
Everton	0–1	Hearts	18 September 1973
Sheffield United	0–0	Dundee United	18 September 1973
Ayr United	1–1	Leicester City	19 September 1973
Morton	1–2	Newcastle United	19 September 1973
St Johnstone	0–2	Norwich City	19 September 1973
Stoke City	0–0	Birmingham City	19 September 1973
Coventry City	0–1	Motherwell	25 September 1973

== First round 2nd leg ==
Home team	Result	Away team	Date
Newcastle United	1–1	Morton	1 October 1973
Birmingham City	0–0	Stoke City	3 October 1973
Dundee United	2–0	Sheffield United	3 October 1973
East Fife	2–3	Burnley	3 October 1973
Hearts	0–0	Everton	3 October 1973
Leicester City	2–0	Ayr United	3 October 1973
Motherwell	3–2	Coventry City	3 October 1973
Norwich City	1–0	St Johnstone	3 October 1973

== Quarter-finals 1st leg ==
Home team	Result	Away team	Date
Birmingham City	1–1	Newcastle United	22 October 1973
Norwich City	2–0	Motherwell	23 October 1973
Hearts	0–3	Burnley	24 October 1973
Leicester City	1–1	Dundee United	24 October 1973

== Quarter-finals 2nd leg ==
Home team	Result	Away team	Date
Burnley	5–0	Hearts	6 November 1973
Motherwell	0–1	Norwich City	6 November 1973
Dundee United	1–0	Leicester City	7 November 1973
Newcastle United	3–1	Birmingham City	5 December 1973

== Semi-finals 1st leg ==
Home team	Result	Away team	Date
Burnley	2–0	Norwich City	27 November 1973
Dundee United	2–0	Newcastle United	12 December 1973

== Semi-finals 2nd leg ==
Home team	Result	Away team	Date
Norwich City	2–3	Burnley	12 December 1973
Newcastle United	4–1	Dundee United	19 December 1973

== Final ==
24 April 1974
19:30 BST

Newcastle United	2 – 1	Burnley
	Report

St James' Park, Newcastle Upon-Tyne
Attendance: 34,540
