= 1970–71 Texaco Cup =

Tournament details
- Country: England; Scotland; Northern Ireland; Ireland
- Teams: 16

Final positions
- Champions: (England) Wolverhampton Wanderers
- Runners-up: (Scotland) Heart of Midlothian

The 1970–71 Texaco Cup was the first edition of the tournament sponsored by Texaco. It was won by Wolverhampton Wanderers, who beat Hearts in a two-legged final by 3–2 on aggregate.

== First round 1st leg ==
Home team	Result	Away team	Date
(Republic of Ireland) Limerick	1–0	(Northern Ireland) Derry City	14 September 1970
(Scotland) Morton	2–1	(England) West Bromwich Albion	14 September 1970
(England) Nottingham Forest	2–2	(Scotland) Airdrieonians	14 September 1970
(England) Burnley	3–1	(Scotland) Hearts	15 September 1970
(Scotland) Dundee	1–2	(England) Wolverhampton Wanderers	16 September 1970
(England) Tottenham Hotspur	4–0	(Scotland) Dunfermline Athletic	16 September 1970
(Northern Ireland) Ards	1–4	(Republic of Ireland) Shamrock Rovers	17 September 1970
(Scotland) Motherwell	1–0	(England) Stoke City	17 September 1970

== First round 2nd leg ==
Home team	Result	Away team	Date
(Scotland) Airdrieonians	2–2	(England) Nottingham Forest	28 September 1970
(Scotland) Dunfermline Athletic	0–3	(England) Tottenham Hotspur	29 September 1970
(England) Wolverhampton Wanderers	0–0	(Scotland) Dundee	29 September 1970
(Scotland) Hearts	4–1	(England) Burnley	30 September 1970
(Republic of Ireland) Shamrock Rovers	2–3	(Northern Ireland) Ards	30 September 1970
(England) Stoke City	2–1	(Scotland) Motherwell	30 September 1970
(England) West Bromwich Albion	0–1	(Scotland) Morton	30 September 1970
(Northern Ireland) Derry City	4–2	(Republic of Ireland) Limerick	1 October 1970

== Quarter-finals 1st leg ==
Home team	Result	Away team	Date
(Scotland) Airdrieonians	0–5	(Scotland) Hearts	19 October 1970
(Northern Ireland) Derry City	4–0	(Republic of Ireland) Shamrock Rovers	21 October 1970
(Scotland) Morton	0–3	(England) Wolverhampton Wanderers	21 October 1970
(England) Tottenham Hotspur	3–2	(Scotland) Motherwell	21 October 1970

== Quarter-finals 2nd leg ==
Home team	Result	Away team	Date
(Scotland) Motherwell	3–1	(England) Tottenham Hotspur	3 November 1970
(England) Wolverhampton Wanderers	1–2	(Scotland) Morton	3 November 1970
(Scotland) Hearts	2–3	(Scotland) Airdrieonians	4 November 1970
(Republic of Ireland) Shamrock Rovers	3–1	(Northern Ireland) Derry City	4 November 1970

== Semi-finals 1st leg ==
Home team	Result	Away team	Date
(Northern Ireland) Derry City	0–1	(England) Wolverhampton Wanderers	1 December 1970
(Scotland) Hearts	1–1	(Scotland) Motherwell	16 December 1970

== Semi-finals 2nd leg ==
Home team	Result	Away team	Date
(Scotland) Motherwell	1–2	(Scotland) Hearts	3 March 1971
(England) Wolverhampton Wanderers	4–0	(Northern Ireland) Derry City	23 March 1971

== Final 1st leg ==
14 April 1971
19:30 BST

(Scotland) Hearts	1 – 3	(England) Wolverhampton Wanderers

Tynecastle Park, Edinburgh

== Final 2nd leg ==
3 May 1971
19:30 BST

(England) Wolverhampton Wanderers	0 – 1	(Scotland) Hearts

Molineux, Wolverhampton
