= Harry Thomson (footballer) =

Scottish footballer

Personal information
- Full name: Henry Watson Thomson
- Date of birth: 25 August 1940
- Place of birth: Edinburgh, Scotland
- Date of death: 14 March 2013 (aged 72)
- Place of death: Barrow-in-Furness, England
- Height: 1.75 m (5 ft 9 in)
- Position: Goalkeeper

Youth career
- –1959: Bo'ness United

Senior career*
Years	Team	Apps	(Gls)
1959–1969	Burnley	117	(0)
1969–1971	Blackpool	61	(0)
1971–1972	Barrow	40	(0)
Total		218	(0)

International career
1967	Scotland	2	(0)
- * Club domestic league appearances and goals

Henry Watson Thomson (25 August 1940 – 14 March 2013) was a Scottish professional footballer. He played as a goalkeeper.

Thomson was born in Edinburgh, but began his professional career with English club, Burnley, having joined the Clarets from Scottish junior side Bo'ness United in 1959. In a decade at Turf Moor, he made 117 league appearances. After a 1966–67 Fairs Cup third-round tie against Napoli, the Daily Express called him "a God in a green jersey", after Thomson kept a clean sheet over two legs in Burnley's 3–0 aggregate victory.

Thomson made two appearances for the Scotland national team during a 1967 overseas tour that the Scottish Football Association decided in October 2021 to reclassify as full internationals.

In 1969, he joined Burnley's Lancashire rivals Blackpool for £5,000. He made his debut in the first game of the 1969–70 season, on 9 August 1969, in a 2–1 victory over Portsmouth at Bloomfield Road. He played in all but two of Blackpool's 48 league and cup games that season, displacing Alan Taylor.

In Thomson's second and final season at Blackpool, 1970–71, he made 21 league appearances. His final game for the club occurred on 13 February 1971, in a 2–0 defeat at Coventry City.

Thomson finished his thirteen-year career at Barrow in 1972.

He died of throat cancer on 14 March 2013, and was survived by his wife, two children and four grandchildren.
