= Texaco Cup =

Association football competition

- Genre: Sporting event
- Frequency: Annual
- Country: England; Scotland; Northern Ireland; Ireland
- Inaugurated: 1970
- Most recent: 1975

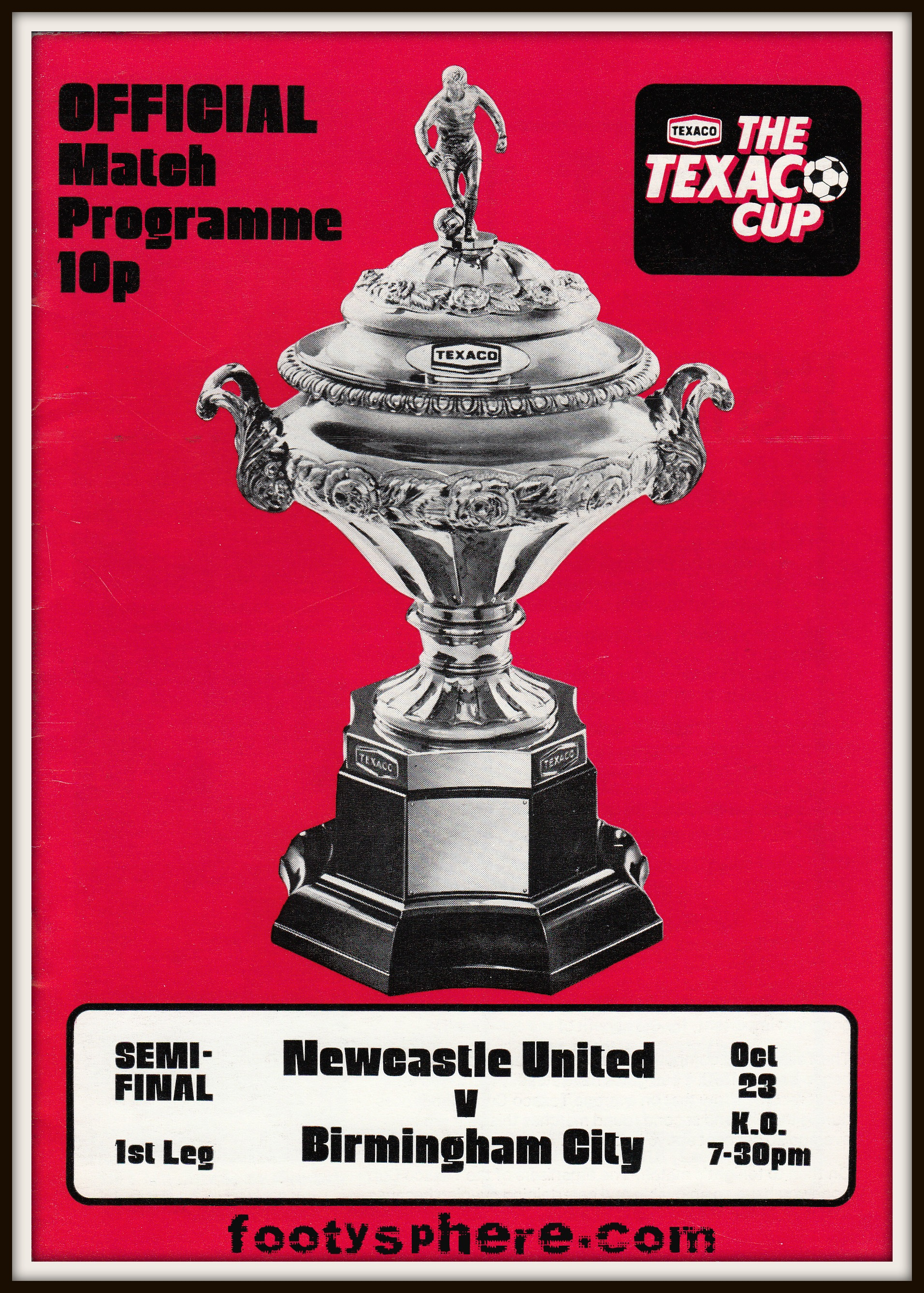
Programme for the 1974–75 Texaco Cup semi-final between Newcastle United and Birmingham City

The Texaco Cup, officially known as the International League Board Competition, was an association football competition started in 1970, involving sides from England, Scotland, and Ireland that had not qualified for European competitions.

It was one of the first football competitions to receive sponsorship, taking the name of American petroleum company Texaco for £100,000, and was instituted to help promote Texaco's recent purchase of the Regent filling station chain. Irish and Northern Irish clubs withdrew from the competition after 1971–72 due to political pressure, competing in a separate Texaco (All-Ireland) Cup in 1973–74 and 1974–75.

Crowds in the competition fell after the first few seasons, and it became the Anglo-Scottish Cup from 1975 to 1976 after Texaco's sponsorship ended.

== Format ==
For the first four seasons it was played as a straight knockout tournament, with sixteen clubs entered, all ties being two-legged. For the final season of the competition, 16 English clubs played in groups before being joined in the knockout stages by four Scottish sides.

== List of finals ==
Season	Winners	Runners-up	Aggregate score
1970–71	(England) Wolverhampton Wanderers	(Scotland) Heart of Midlothian	3–2
1971–72	(England) Derby County	(Scotland) Airdrieonians	2–1
1972–73	(England) Ipswich Town	(England) Norwich City	4–2
1973–74	(England) Newcastle United	(England) Burnley	2–1 (Note: Final was played as a single game.)
1974–75	(England) Newcastle United	(England) Southampton	3–1

== Participants ==
=== 1970–71 ===
(England) Burnley, Nottingham Forest, Stoke City, Tottenham Hotspur, West Bromwich Albion, Wolverhampton Wanderers
(Scotland) Airdrieonians, Dunfermline Athletic, Dundee, Hearts, Morton, Motherwell
(Northern Ireland) Ards, Derry City
(Republic of Ireland) Limerick, Shamrock Rovers

=== 1971–72 ===
(England) Coventry City, Derby County, Huddersfield Town, Manchester City, Newcastle United, Stoke City
(Scotland) Airdrieonians, Dundee United, Falkirk, Hearts, Morton, Motherwell
(Northern Ireland) Ballymena United, Coleraine
(Republic of Ireland) Shamrock Rovers, Waterford

=== 1972–73 ===
(England) Coventry City, Crystal Palace, Ipswich Town, Leicester City, Newcastle United, Norwich City, Sheffield United, West Bromwich Albion, Wolverhampton Wanderers
(Scotland) Ayr United, Dundee, Dundee United, Hearts, Kilmarnock, Motherwell, St Johnstone

=== 1973–74 ===
(England) Birmingham City, Burnley, Coventry City, Everton, Leicester City, Newcastle United, Norwich City, Sheffield United, Stoke City
(Scotland) Ayr United, Dundee United, East Fife, Hearts, Morton, Motherwell, St Johnstone

=== 1974–75 ===
(England) Birmingham City, Blackpool, Carlisle United, Leyton Orient, Luton Town, Manchester City, Middlesbrough, Newcastle United, Norwich City, Oldham Athletic, Peterborough United, Sheffield United, Southampton, Sunderland, West Bromwich Albion, West Ham United
(Scotland) Aberdeen, Ayr United, Hearts, Rangers
