= David Jones (footballer, born 1952) =

Welsh footballer

Personal information
- Full name: David Edward Jones
- Date of birth: 11 February 1952 (age 74)
- Place of birth: Gosport, England
- Position: Defender

Senior career*
Years	Team	Apps	(Gls)
1969-1974	Bournemouth	134	(5)
1974-1975	Nottingham Forest	36	(1)
1975-1980	Norwich City	123	(4)
Total		293	(10)

International career
1976–1980	Wales	8	(1)
- * Club domestic league appearances and goals

David Jones (born 11 February 1952) is a Welsh former professional footballer who played as a defender. He was part of the Wales national team between 1976 and 1980, playing eight matches and scoring one goal. He played his first match on 6 May 1976 against Scotland and his last match on 17 May 1980 against England.

== See also ==
- List of Wales international footballers (alphabetical)
