= Paddy Greenwood =

English footballer

Personal information
- Date of birth: 17 October 1946 (age 80)
- Place of birth: Hull, England
- Position: Left back

Youth career
- –1965: Hull City

Senior career*
Years	Team	Apps	(Gls)
1965–1971	Hull City	149	(3)
1971–1974	Barnsley	111	(6)
1974	Boston Minutemen	19	(4)
1974–1976	Nottingham Forest	15	(0)
1976	Boston Minutemen	5	(0)
Total		299	(13)
- * Club domestic league appearances and goals

Paddy Greenwood (born 17 October 1946) is an English retired professional footballer who played in England and the United States as a left back.

== Career ==
Born in Hull, Greenwood began his career with the youth teams of hometown club Hull City. He turned professional in 1965, and later played for Barnsley and Nottingham Forest. Greenwood also played in the NASL for the Boston Minutemen.
