= Alan Crawford (English footballer) =

English footballer

Personal information
- Full name: Alan Paterson Crawford
- Date of birth: 30 October 1953 (age 72)
- Place of birth: Rotherham, England
- Height: 5 ft 8 in (1.73 m)
- Position: Winger

Youth career
- 19??–1971: Rotherham United

Senior career*
Years	Team	Apps	(Gls)
1971–1978	Rotherham United	237	(49)
1973	→ Mansfield Town (loan)	2	(0)
1979–1982	Chesterfield	94	(20)
1982–1985	Bristol City	92	(26)
1985–19??	Exeter City	33	(3)
- Bath City

Managerial career
- Blackpool (coach)
- Stockport County (coach)
- West Bromwich Albion (coach)
- Nottingham Forest (coach)
- Rotherham United (scout)
- * Club domestic league appearances and goals

Alan Paterson Crawford (born 30 October 1953) is an English former footballer who made more than 450 Football League appearances scoring 98 goals playing as an outside left.

== Career ==
Crawford started his football career with Rotherham United and went on to make 169 consecutive appearances for them. He scored 31 Football League goals in their Third Division campaign in 1976–77, which is a Rotherham record for a midfielder. In 2007, he was voted as the greatest ever left-sided midfielder for Rotherham, in a Millers Mad poll.

Crawford later moved to Chesterfield, and scored the winning goal for them in their 1980/81 Anglo-Scottish Cup victory over Notts County. Crawford subsequently played for Bristol City, Exeter City, Bath City and Bristol Manor Farm. He rejoined Bristol City as a youth team coach before retiring from football working as a painter & decorator in Backwell near Bristol in the late 1990s.

== Coach/Scout ==
In recent years, Crawford has established himself as a football coach with clubs such as Blackpool, Stockport County, West Bromwich Albion and Nottingham Forest, working notably for Gary Megson. He is a scout for his hometown team Rotherham United.
