= Bob Chapman =

English footballer

Personal information
- Full name: Robert Dennis Chapman
- Date of birth: 18 August 1946 (age 80)
- Place of birth: Aldridge, England
- Position: Defender

Senior career*
Years	Team	Apps	(Gls)
1964–1977	Nottingham Forest	359	(17)
1977–1978	Notts County	42	(0)
1978–1980	Shrewsbury Town	37	(6)
1979	→ Tulsa Roughnecks (loan)	30	(7)
	Burton Albion	?	
1981–	Shepshed Charterhouse		
- * Club domestic league appearances and goals

Robert Dennis Chapman (born 18 August 1946), also known as Sammy Chapman, is a footballer who played as a defender in the Football League during the 1960s and 1970s, most notably with Nottingham Forest.

== Career ==
Chapman made his debut for Forest in 1964 at the age of 17 years 5 months. At the time this made him the youngest ever Forest player. He made 422 senior appearances for the club and was club captain. He scored 23 Forest goals and remained a regular after the arrival of new manager Brian Clough during the 1974-75 season. In 1977 Forest won promotion back to the top flight. That was Chapman's last season at Forest.

He joined Notts County staying there for a year. He next moved to Shrewsbury Town for his last two seasons of senior football.

He moved to non-league Burton Albion before in July 1981 he joined Shepshed Charterhouse

== Family ==
His son Robert has played cricket for Nottinghamshire County Cricket Club.
