= 1976–77 Anglo-Scottish Cup =

Tournament details
- Country: England; Scotland
- Teams: 24

Final positions
- Champions: Nottingham Forest
- Runners-up: Orient

The 1976–77 Anglo-Scottish Cup was the second edition of the tournament. It was won by Nottingham Forest, who beat Orient in a two-legged final by 5–1 on aggregate.

== English group ==
=== Group A ===
Home team	Result	Away team	Date
Blackburn Rovers	1–1	Burnley	7 August 1976
Bolton Wanderers	0–0	Blackpool	7 August 1976
Blackburn Rovers	1–0	Blackpool	9 August 1976
Bolton Wanderers	2–0	Blackburn Rovers	10 August 1976
Blackpool	2–1	Burnley	11 August 1976
Burnley	1–0	Bolton Wanderers	14 August 1976

Team	Pld	W	D	L	GF	GA	GD	BP	Pts
Bolton Wanderers	3	1	1	1	2	1	+1	0	3
Blackpool	3	1	1	1	2	2	0	0	3
Burnley	3	1	1	1	3	3	0	0	3
Blackburn Rovers	3	1	1	1	2	3	-1	0	3

=== Group B ===
Home team	Result	Away team	Date
Bristol City	1–0	West Bromwich Albion	7 August 1976
Notts County	0–0	Nottingham Forest	7 August 1976
Bristol City	2–0	Notts County	10 August 1976
Nottingham Forest	3–2	West Bromwich Albion	11 August 1976
Nottingham Forest	4–2	Bristol City	14 August 1976
West Bromwich Albion	3–1	Notts County	14 August 1976

Team	Pld	W	D	L	GF	GA	GD	BP	Pts
Nottingham Forest	3	2	1	0	7	4	+3	2	7
Bristol City	3	2	0	1	5	4	+1	0	4
West Bromwich Albion	3	1	0	2	5	5	0	1	3
Notts County	3	0	1	2	1	5	-4	0	1

=== Group C ===
Home team	Result	Away team	Date
Chelsea	0–0	Fulham	7 August 1976
Norwich City	0–0	Orient	7 August 1976
Chelsea	1–1	Norwich City	11 August 1976
Orient	2–1	Fulham	11 August 1976
Fulham	1–1	Norwich City	14 August 1976
Orient	2–1	Chelsea	14 August 1976

Team	Pld	W	D	L	GF	GA	GD	BP	Pts
Orient	3	2	1	0	4	2	+2	0	5
Norwich City	3	0	3	0	2	2	0	0	3
Chelsea	3	0	2	1	2	3	-1	0	2
Fulham	3	0	2	1	2	3	-1	0	2

=== Group D ===
Home team	Result	Away team	Date
Middlesbrough	2–0	Hull City	7 August 1976
Sheffield United	0–1	Newcastle United	7 August 1976
Hull City	0–0	Newcastle United	10 August 1976
Sheffield United	0–1	Middlesbrough	10 August 1976
Hull City	1–0	Sheffield United	14 August 1976
Newcastle United	3–0	Middlesbrough	14 August 1976

Team	Pld	W	D	L	GF	GA	GD	BP	Pts
Newcastle United	3	2	1	0	4	0	+4	1	6
Middlesbrough	3	2	0	1	3	3	0	0	4
Hull City	3	1	1	1	1	2	-1	0	3
Sheffield United	3	0	0	3	0	3	-3	0	0

== Scottish group ==
=== 1st round 1st leg ===
Home team	Result	Away team	Date
Ayr United	0–0	Clydebank	7 August 1976
Dundee United	1–0	Aberdeen	7 August 1976
Motherwell	1–1	Kilmarnock	7 August 1976
Raith Rovers	1–2	Partick Thistle	7 August 1976

=== 1st round 2nd leg ===
Home team	Result	Away team	Date
Clydebank	0–1	Ayr United	9 August 1976
Aberdeen	3–1	Dundee United	11 August 1976
Kilmarnock	4–0	Motherwell	11 August 1976
Partick Thistle	3–1	Raith Rovers	11 August 1976

== Quarter-finals 1st leg ==
Home team	Result	Away team	Date
Bolton Wanderers	0–0	Partick Thistle	14 September 1976
Nottingham Forest	2–1	Kilmarnock	14 September 1976
Aberdeen	0–1	Orient	15 September 1976
Ayr United	3–0	Newcastle United	15 September 1976

== Quarter-finals 2nd leg ==
Home team	Result	Away team	Date
Kilmarnock	2–2	Nottingham Forest	28 September 1976
Orient	1–0	Aberdeen	29 September 1976
Partick Thistle	1–0	Bolton Wanderers	29 September 1976

Ayr United were awarded semi-final place after Newcastle United were disqualified for fielding a weakened team during the first leg.

== Semi-finals 1st leg ==
Home team	Result	Away team	Date
Nottingham Forest	2–1	Ayr United	20 October 1976
Partick Thistle	0–1	Orient	8 November 1976

== Semi-finals 2nd leg ==
Home team	Result	Away team	Date
Ayr United	0–2	Nottingham Forest	3 November 1976
Orient	3–2	Partick Thistle	24 November 1976

== Final 1st leg ==
13 December 1976
19:30 BST

Orient	1 – 1	Nottingham Forest
Possee		Robertson

Brisbane Road, London
Attendance: 5,058

== Final 2nd leg ==
15 December 1976
19:30 BST

Nottingham Forest	4 – 0	Orient
Barrett Barrett Chapman Bowyer

City Ground, Nottingham
Attendance: 12,717

== Notes and references ==
- "Anglo-Scottish Cup 1976/1977". Football Club History Database.
