= 2006–07 Northampton Town F.C. season =

Northampton Town
2006–07 season
- Chairman: David Cardoza
- Manager: John Gorman (until 20 December); Stuart Gray (from 2 January)
- Stadium: Sixfields Stadium
- League One: 14th
- FA Cup: Second round
- League Cup: First round
- League Trophy: First round
- Top goalscorer: League: Scott McGleish (12); All: Scott McGleish (13)
- Highest home attendance: 7,172 vs Nottingham Forest
- Lowest home attendance: 2,088 vs Brentford

The 2006–07 season was Northampton Town's 110th season in their history and the first season in League One after promotion the previous season. Alongside competing in League One, the club also participated in the FA Cup, League Cup and Football League Trophy.

== Players ==
As of match played 5 May 2007.

No.	Name	Position	Nat.	Place of birth	Date of birth (age)	Apps	Goals	Previous club	Date signed	Fee
Goalkeepers
13	Mark Bunn	GK	(England)	Kettering	16 November 1984 (aged 22)	49	0	Apprentice	21 August 2001	N/A
21	Chris Dunn	GK	(England)	Havering	23 October 1987 (aged 19)	0	0	Apprentice	22 April 2006	N/A
Defenders
2	Jason Crowe	RB	(England)	Sidcup	30 September 1978 (aged 28)	95	5	Grimsby Town	29 May 2005	Free
4	Mark Hughes	CB	(England)	Kirkby	9 December 1986 (aged 20)	19	0	Everton	31 January 2007	Undisclosed
6	Chris Doig	CB	(Scotland)	Dumfries	13 February 1981 (aged 26)	96	3	Nottingham Forest	30 June 2005	Free
15	Brett Johnson	CB/LB	(England)	Hammersmith	15 August 1985 (aged 21)	14	0	Aldershot Town	30 June 2005	Nominal
16	Sean Dyche	CB	(England)	Kettering	28 June 1971 (aged 35)	61	0	Watford	1 July 2005	Free
19	Alex Pearce	CB	(England)	Wallingford	9 November 1988 (aged 18)	15	1	Reading	9 February 2007	Loan
20	Pedj Bojic	RB	(Australia)	Sydney	9 April 1984 (aged 23)	115	6	Sydney Olympic	3 August 2004	Free
24	Liam Dolman	CB	(England)	Northampton	26 September 1987 (aged 19)	2	0	Apprentice	1 July 2005	N/A
29	Danny May	RB	(England)	Watford	19 November 1988 (aged 18)	3	0	Apprentice	6 October 2006	N/A
Midfielders
3	Andy Holt	LB/LM	(England)	Stockport	21 April 1978 (aged 29)	39	2	Wrexham	27 June 2006	Free
7	Ian Taylor	CM	(England)	Birmingham	4 June 1968 (aged 38)	74	8	Derby County	30 June 2005	Free
10	Sam Aiston	W	(England)	Newcastle upon Tyne	21 November 1976 (aged 30)	22	0	Tranmere Rovers	27 June 2006	Free
12	David Hunt	U	(England)	Dulwich	10 September 1982 (aged 24)	84	3	Leyton Orient	23 March 2005	Free
14	Joe Burnell	CM	(England)	Bristol	10 October 1980 (aged 26)	29	2	Wycombe Wanderers	7 June 2006	Free
17	Bradley Johnson	CM	(England)	Hackney	28 April 1987 (aged 20)	33	5	Cambridge United	16 May 2005	Free
23	Jerome Watt	W	(England)	Preston	20 October 1984 (aged 22)	14	1	Blackburn Rovers	10 August 2006	Free
28	Ryan Gilligan	W	(England)	Swindon	18 January 1987 (aged 20)	51	4	Watford	12 August 2005	Free
Forwards
8	Andy Kirk	FW	(Northern Ireland)	Belfast	29 May 1979 (aged 27)	107	25	Boston United	10 March 2005	£125,000
9	Kenny Deuchar	FW	(Scotland)	Stirling	6 July 1980 (aged 26)	17	3	Gretna	31 January 2007	Loan
27	Jordan Robertson	FW	(England)	Sheffield	12 February 1988 (aged 19)	17	3	Sheffield United	26 January 2007	Loan
31	Simon Cox	FW	(England)	Tilehurst	28 April 1987 (aged 20)	8	3	Reading	22 March 2007	Loan

== Competitions ==
=== Football League One ===
==== League table ====
Pos	Team	Pld	W	D	L	GF	GA	GD	Pts
12	Port Vale	46	18	6	22	64	65	−1	60
13	Crewe Alexandra	46	17	9	20	66	72	−6	60
14	Northampton Town	46	15	14	17	48	51	−3	59
15	Huddersfield Town	46	14	17	15	60	69	−9	59
16	Gillingham	46	17	8	21	56	77	−21	59

Rules for classification: In the Football League goals scored (GF) takes precedence over goal difference (GD).

==== Results summary ====
Overall								Home						Away					
Pld	W	D	L	GF	GA	GD	Pts	W	D	L	GF	GA	GD	W	D	L	GF	GA	GD
46	15	14	17	48	51	−3	59	8	5	10	27	28	−1	7	9	7	21	23	−2

Last updated: 30 June 2007.

==== League position by match ====
Round	1	2	3	4	5	6	7	8	9	10	11	12	13	14	15	16	17	18	19	20	21	22	23	24	25	26	27	28	29	30	31	32	33	34	35	36	37	38	39	40	41	42	43	44	45	46
Ground	A	H	H	A	H	A	A	H	H	A	A	H	A	H	A	H	H	A	A	H	A	H	A	H	A	A	H	H	H	H	A	A	H	A	H	A	H	A	A	H	A	H	A	H	H	A
Result	D	L	L	W	L	W	D	D	L	W	W	L	D	D	D	W	D	L	D	L	D	L	L	W	D	D	W	W	L	L	L	L	D	W	W	L	W	W	L	L	W	W	L	W	D	D
Position	12	17	20	15	21	13	17	20	20	18	11	16	15	14	16	13	16	17	18	18	18	18	19	18	18	18	17	15	16	19	19	19	18	17	16	17	17	15	16	18	16	13	15	15	12	14

Source: Northampton Town F.C.
A = Away; H = Home; W = Win; D = Draw; L = Loss

==== Matches ====
Win Draw Loss

5 August 2006 1	Crewe Alexandra	2–2	Northampton Town	Crewe
15:00 BST	R.Lowe 7'; D.Vaughan 19'	Report	S.McGleish 12'; A.Kirk 42'	Stadium: Gresty Road; Attendance: 5,553; Referee: Mike Pike

8 August 2006 2	Northampton Town	0–1	Brentford	Northampton
19:45 BST		Report	C.Moore 71'	Stadium: Sixfields Stadium; Attendance: 5,707; Referee: Darren Deadman

12 August 2006 3	Northampton Town	0–1	Nottingham Forest	Northampton
15:00 BST	S.McGleish (red card) 62'	Report	C.Doig 46' (o.g.)	Stadium: Sixfields Stadium; Attendance: 7,172; Referee: Lee Probert

19 August 2006 4	Gillingham	0–1	Northampton Town	Gillingham
15:00 BST		Report	A.Kirk 23'	Stadium: Priestfield Stadium; Attendance: 5,553; Referee: Clive Penton

29 August 2006 5	Northampton Town	1–3	Bristol City	Northampton
19:45 BST	A.Kirk 18'	Report	P.Jevons 32' (pen.); B.Orr (red card) 45'; S.Brooker 71'; D.Cotterill 90' (pen.)	Stadium: Sixfields Stadium; Attendance: 4,919; Referee: Mike Jones
Note: Live on Sky Sports

1 September 2006 6	Rotherham United	1–2	Northampton Town	Rotherham
19:45 BST	D.Hibbert 7'	Report	S.McGleish 74', 82'	Stadium: Millmoor; Attendance: 4,971; Referee: Carl Boyeson

9 September 2006 7	Carlisle United	1–1	Northampton Town	Carlisle
15:00 BST	K.Hawley 56'	Report	S.McGleish 47'	Stadium: Brunton Park; Attendance: 7,602; Referee: A R Hall

12 September 2006 8	Northampton Town	1–1	Yeovil Town	Northampton
19:45 BST	J.Crowe 32'	Report	M.Stewart 68'	Stadium: Sixfields Stadium; Attendance: 4,853; Referee: Tony Bates

16 September 2006 9	Northampton Town	1–3	Tranmere Rovers	Northampton
15:00 BST	S.McGleish 74'	Report	C.Zola 14'; G.Taylor 35'; J.Mullin 58' (pen.)	Stadium: Sixfields Stadium; Attendance: 5,334; Referee: Gary Sutton

23 September 2006 10	Millwall	0–1	Northampton Town	Bermondsey, London
15:00 BST		Report	M.Cole 42'	Stadium: The Den; Attendance: 7,432; Referee: P Melin

26 September 2006 11	Cheltenham Town	0–2	Northampton Town	Cheltenham
19:45 BST		Report	A.Kirk 67'; S.McGleish 83' (pen.)	Stadium: Whaddon Road; Attendance: 3,224; Referee: P Armstrong

30 September 2006 12	Northampton Town	0–2	Port Vale	Northampton
15:00 BST		Report	G.Pilkington 12'; S.Moore 32'	Stadium: Sixfields Stadium; Attendance: 5,316; Referee: Ray Oliver

6 October 2006 13	AFC Bournemouth	0–0	Northampton Town	Bournemouth
19:45 BST		Report		Stadium: Dean Court; Attendance: 5,746; Referee: Fred Graham

13 October 2006 14	Northampton Town	0–0	Bradford City	Northampton
19:45 BST		Report		Stadium: Sixfields Stadium; Attendance: 5,625; Referee: R Booth

21 October 2006 15	Brighton & Hove Albion	1–1	Northampton Town	Brighton
15:00 BST	J.Robinson 39'	Report	J.Quinn 84'	Stadium: Withdean Stadium; Attendance: 5,862; Referee: Mike Thorpe

28 October 2006 16	Northampton Town	1–0	Swansea City	Northampton
15:00 BST	L.Chambers 55'	Report	L.Britton (red card) 90'	Stadium: Sixfields Stadium; Attendance: 5,444; Referee: Phil Crossley

4 November 2006 17	Northampton Town	1–1	Blackpool	Northampton
15:00 GMT	E.Jess 62'	Report	A.Morrell 20'	Stadium: Sixfields Stadium; Attendance: 5,762; Referee: Keith Hill

18 November 2006 18	Scunthorpe United	1–0	Northampton Town	Scunthorpe
15:00 GMT	A.Crosby 86' (pen.)	Report		Stadium: Glanford Park; Attendance: 4,758; Referee: Jon Moss

6 December 2006 19	Chesterfield	0–0	Northampton Town	Chesterfield
19:30 GMT		Report		Stadium: Saltergate; Attendance: 3,341; Referee: Graham Salisbury

9 December 2006 20	Northampton Town	0–2	Doncaster Rovers	Northampton
15:00 GMT		Report	P.Heffernan 75'; L.Guy 86'	Stadium: Sixfields Stadium; Attendance: 5,131; Referee: P Melin

16 December 2006 21	Huddersfield Town	1–1	Northampton Town	Huddersfield
15:00 GMT	D.Schofield 65'	Report	J.Burnell 19'	Stadium: Galpharm Stadium; Attendance: 8,723; Referee: C Oliver

19 December 2006 22	Northampton Town	0–1	Leyton Orient	Northampton
19:45 GMT		Report	P.Connor 79'	Stadium: Sixfields Stadium; Attendance: 4,728; Referee: Anthony Taylor
Note: Fixture was previously postponed on 25 November 2006 due to a waterlogged pitch.

23 December 2006 23	Oldham Athletic	3–0	Northampton Town	Oldham
15:00 GMT	G.McDonald 22'; C.Porter 37'; A.Liddell 61'	Report		Stadium: Boundary Park; Attendance: 10,207; Referee: Gary Sutton

26 December 2006 24	Northampton Town	2–0	Cheltenham Town	Northampton
15:00 GMT	S.McGleish 45', 74' (pen.)	Report		Stadium: Sixfields Stadium; Attendance: 5,239; Referee: Steve Bratt

1 January 2007 25	Yeovil Town	0–0	Northampton Town	Yeovil
15:00 GMT		Report		Stadium: Huish Park; Attendance: 5,361; Referee: Rob Shoebridge

6 January 2007 26	Tranmere Rovers	1–1	Northampton Town	Birkenhead
15:00 GMT	J.Mullin 87'	Report	S.McGleish 11'	Stadium: Prenton Park; Attendance: 6,089; Referee: Dave Foster

13 January 2007 27	Northampton Town	3–2	Carlisle United	Northampton
15:00 GMT	A.Kirk 45'; S.McGleish 47', 71'	Report	D.Graham 82'; K.Gall 86'	Stadium: Sixfields Stadium; Attendance: 5,549; Referee: Fred Graham

23 January 2007 28	Northampton Town	3–0	Millwall	Northampton
19:45 GMT	S.McGleish 46'; A.Holt 71'; B.Johnson 90'	Report	A.Dunne (red card) 90'	Stadium: Sixfields Stadium; Attendance: 5,834; Referee: Ray Oliver
Note: Fixture was previously abandoned on 30 December 2006 due to a waterlogged pitch after 68 minutes.

28 January 2007 29	Northampton Town	2–3	Oldham Athletic	Northampton
15:00 GMT	A.Kirk 24'; J.Robertson 88'	Report	R.Wellens 2'; P.Warne 44'; C.Porter 58'	Stadium: Sixfields Stadium; Attendance: 5,662; Referee: Mike Pike

3 February 2007 30	Northampton Town	1–2	Crewe Alexandra	Northampton
15:00 GMT	B.Johnson 55'	Report	L.Varney 26', 57'	Stadium: Sixfields Stadium; Attendance: 5,262; Referee: Paul Taylor

6 February 2007 31	Port Vale	1–0	Northampton Town	Burslem
19:45 GMT	D.Whitaker 47'	Report		Stadium: Vale Park; Attendance: 3,353; Referee: Anthony Taylor

10 February 2007 32	Nottingham Forest	1–0	Northampton Town	Nottingham
15:00 GMT	J.Bennett 66'	Report		Stadium: City Ground; Attendance: 24,573; Referee: Tony Bates

16 February 2007 33	Northampton Town	1–1	Gillingham	Northampton
19:45 GMT	J.Robertson 86'	Report	D.McDonald 61'	Stadium: Sixfields Stadium; Attendance: 5,618; Referee: G Laws

19 February 2007 34	Brentford	0–1	Northampton Town	Brentford, London
19:45 GMT		Report	J.Crowe 31'	Stadium: Griffin Park; Attendance: 5,164; Referee: P Armstrong
Note: Live on Sky Sports

24 February 2007 35	Northampton Town	3–0	Rotherham United	Northampton
15:00 GMT	K.Deuchar 15'; M.Hughes 21'; I.Taylor 45'	Report		Stadium: Sixfields Stadium; Attendance: 4,564; Referee: Kevin Friend

3 March 2007 36	Bristol City	1–0	Northampton Town	Bristol
15:00 GMT	K.Betsy 19'	Report		Stadium: Ashton Gate; Attendance: 11,965; Referee: Grant Hegley

10 March 2007 37	Northampton Town	3–1	Bournemouth	Northampton
15:00 GMT	J.Robertson 17'; K.Deuchar 77'; A.Kirk 85'	Report	M.Wilson 55'	Stadium: Sixfields Stadium; Attendance: 5,921; Referee: Pat Miller

17 March 2007 38	Bradford City	1–2	Northampton Town	Bradford
15:00 GMT	B.Paynter 62'	Report	B.Johnson 64'; K.Deuchar 87'	Stadium: Valley Parade; Attendance: 8,190; Referee: Andy Hall

24 March 2007 39	Swansea City	2–1	Northampton Town	Swansea, Wales
15:00 GMT	D.Lawrence 45'; A.Robinson 46'	Report	B.Johnson 6'	Stadium: Liberty Stadium; Attendance: 11,071; Referee: Keith Stroud

31 March 2007 40	Northampton Town	0–2	Brighton & Hove Albion	Northampton
15:00 BST		Report	B.Savage 60', 66'	Stadium: Sixfields Stadium; Attendance: 6,613; Referee: Darren Deadman

7 April 2007 41	Leyton Orient	0–2	Northampton Town	Leyton, London
15:00 BST		Report	S.Cox 12'; A.Palmer 40' (o.g.)	Stadium: Brisbane Road; Attendance: 11,071; Referee: Andy D'Urso

9 April 2007 42	Northampton Town	2–1	Scunthorpe United	Northampton
15:00 BST	A.Pearce 16'; B.Johnson 90' (red card)	Report	B.Sharp 57'	Stadium: Sixfields Stadium; Attendance: 6,361; Referee: Phil Crossley

14 April 2007 43	Blackpool	4–1	Northampton Town	Blackpool
15:00 BST	C.Brandon 49', 62'; W.Hoolahan 55' (pen.); S.Dyche 84' (o.g.)	Report	S.Cox 42'	Stadium: Bloomfield Road; Attendance: 7,334; Referee: Mick Russell

21 April 2007 44	Northampton Town	1–0	Chesterfield	Northampton
15:00 BST	S.Cox 78'	Report		Stadium: Sixfields Stadium; Attendance: 5,730; Referee: Dermot Gallagher

27 April 2007 45	Northampton Town	1–1	Huddersfield Town	Northampton
19:45 BST	A.Holt 63'	Report	D.Mirfin 75'	Stadium: Sixfields Stadium; Attendance: 5,842; Referee: Ray Oliver

5 May 2007 46	Doncaster Rovers	2–2	Northampton Town	Doncaster
15:00 BST	C.Nelthorpe 13'; G.Roberts 59'	Report	J.Crowe 45'; M.Hughes 64'	Stadium: Keepmoat Stadium; Attendance: 7,534; Referee: C Oliver

=== FA Cup ===
11 November 2006 First round	Northampton Town	0–0	Grimsby Town	Northampton
15:00 GMT		Report		Stadium: Sixfields Stadium; Attendance: 4,092; Referee: Rob Shoebridge

21 November 2006 First round (r)	Grimsby Town	0–2	Northampton Town	Grimsby
19:45 GMT		Report	J.Whittle 18' (o.g.); J.Burnell 45'	Stadium: Blundell Park; Attendance: 2,657; Referee: Darren Deadman

2 December 2006 Second round	Barnet	4–1	Northampton Town	High Barnet
15:00 GMT	A.Birchall 49'; D.Sinclair 53'; I.Hendon 67' (pen.); M.Vieira 87'	Report	S.McGleish 45'	Stadium: Underhill Stadium; Attendance: 2,786; Referee: Keith Stroud

=== League Cup ===
22 August 2006 First round	Queens Park Rangers	3–2	Northampton Town	Shepherd's Bush, London
19:45 BST	L.Cook 18'; K.Gallen 50'; R.Jones 87'	Report	J.Watt 55'; A.Kirk 78'	Stadium: Loftus Road; Attendance: 4,569; Referee: Pat Miller

=== League Trophy ===
17 October 2006 First round (s)	Northampton Town	0–0 (a.e.t.) (2–4 p)	Brentford	Northampton
19:45 BST		Report		Stadium: Sixfields Stadium; Attendance: 2,088; Referee: Rob Shoebridge
	Penalties
	A.Kirk (penalty scored); E.Jess (penalty missed); P.Bojić (penalty scored); J.Watt (penalty missed)		K.O'Connor (penalty scored); M.Heywood (penalty scored); A.Frampton (penalty scored); P.Brooker (penalty scored)

=== Appearances, goals and cards ===
No.	Pos	Player	League One			FA Cup			League Cup			League Trophy			Total			Discipline	
No.	Pos	Player	Starts	Sub	Goals	Starts	Sub	Goals	Starts	Sub	Goals	Starts	Sub	Goals	Starts	Sub	Goals	Booked	Sent off (straight red)
2	RB	Jason Crowe	43	–	3	2	–	–	1	–	–	1	–	–	47	–	3	8	–
3	LB	Andy Holt	33	2	2	2	1	–	–	–	–	1	–	–	36	3	2	2	–
4	CB	Mark Hughes	17	–	2	–	–	–	–	–	–	–	–	–	17	–	2	6	–
6	CB	Chris Doig	39	–	–	3	–	–	–	–	–	–	–	–	42	–	–	5	–
7	CM	Ian Taylor	26	7	1	2	1	–	–	–	–	–	–	–	28	8	1	6	–
8	ST	Andy Kirk	29	15	7	1	1	–	1	–	1	1	–	–	32	16	8	–	–
9	ST	Kenny Deuchar	14	3	3	–	–	–	–	–	–	–	–	–	14	3	3	1	–
10	W	Sam Aiston	14	7	–	–	–	–	1	–	–	–	–	–	15	7	–	3	–
12	CM	David Hunt	20	9	–	3	–	–	–	–	–	1	–	–	24	9	–	6	–
13	GK	Mark Bunn	42	–	–	3	–	–	1	–	–	1	–	–	47	–	–	4	–
14	CM	Joe Burnell	24	–	1	2	1	1	1	–	–	1	–	–	28	1	2	2	–
15	CB	Brett Johnson	2	2	–	–	–	–	1	–	–	–	1	–	3	3	–	–	–
16	CB	Sean Dyche	20	1	–	2	–	–	1	–	–	–	–	–	23	1	–	2	–
17	CM	Bradley Johnson	21	6	5	–	–	–	1	–	–	–	–	–	22	7	5	6	1
19	CB	Alex Pearce	15	–	1	–	–	–	–	–	–	–	–	–	15	–	1	–	–
20	RB	Pedj Bojić	19	7	–	1	1	–	–	1	–	1	–	–	21	9	–	3	–
21	GK	Chris Dunn	–	–	–	–	–	–	–	–	–	–	–	–	–	–	–	–	–
23	RM	Jerome Watt	2	8	–	1	1	–	–	1	1	–	1	–	3	11	1	–	–
24	CB	Liam Dolman	1	–	–	–	–	–	–	–	–	–	–	–	1	–	–	–	–
27	ST	Jordan Robertson	9	8	3	–	–	–	–	–	–	–	–	–	9	8	3	1	–
28	RM	Ryan Gilligan	14	9	–	–	1	–	–	1	–	–	1	–	14	12	–	5	–
29	RB	Danny May	2	1	–	–	–	–	–	–	–	–	–	–	2	1	–	–	–
31	ST	Simon Cox	6	2	3	–	–	–	–	–	–	–	–	–	6	2	3	1	–
–	LB	Fred Murray	–	–	–	–	–	–	–	–	–	–	–	–	–	–	–	–	–
Out on loan:
22	ST	James Quinn	5	13	1	2	1	–	1	–	–	–	–	–	9	14	1	–	–
Players no longer at the club:
1	GK	Lee Harper	4	–	–	–	–	–	–	–	–	–	–	–	4	–	–	–	–
4	CB	Luke Chambers	29	–	1	3	–	–	1	–	–	1	–	–	34	–	1	3	–
9	ST	Scott McGleish	24	1	12	3	–	1	–	–	–	1	–	–	28	1	13	1	1
11	CM	Eoin Jess	22	4	1	3	–	–	1	–	–	1	–	–	27	4	1	2	–
25	ST	Scott Cross	–	–	–	–	–	–	–	–	–	–	–	–	–	–	–	–	–
26	CB	Tom Bonner	–	–	–	–	–	–	–	–	–	–	–	–	–	–	–	–	–
26	CM	Marc Laird	2	4	–	–	–	–	–	–	–	–	–	–	2	4	–	1	–
27	LM	Mitchell Cole	6	2	1	–	–	–	–	–	–	1	–	–	7	2	1	1	–
27	ST	Nick Wright	2	2	–	–	1	–	–	–	–	–	–	–	2	2	–	–	–
