= 2005–06 Northampton Town F.C. season =

Northampton Town
2005–06 season
- Chairman: David Cardoza
- Manager: Colin Calderwood
- Stadium: Sixfields Stadium
- League Two: 2nd (Promoted)
- FA Cup: Third round
- League Cup: Second round
- League Trophy: Second round
- Top goalscorer: League: Scott McGleish (17); All: Scott McGleish (24)
- Highest home attendance: 7,114 vs Chester City
- Lowest home attendance: 2,041 vs Notts County

The 2005–06 season was Northampton Town's 109th season in their history and the third successive season in League Two. Alongside competing in League Two, the club also participated in the FA Cup, League Cup and Football League Trophy.

== Players ==
As of match played 6 May 2006.

No.	Name	Position	Nat.	Place of birth	Date of birth (age)	Apps	Goals	Previous club	Date signed	Fee
Goalkeepers
1	Lee Harper	GK	(England)	Chelsea	30 October 1971 (aged 34)	178	0	Walsall	15 July 2002	Free
13	Mark Bunn	GK	(England)	Kettering	16 November 1984 (aged 21)	2	0	Apprentice	21 August 2001	N/A
22	Chris Dunn	GK	(England)	Havering	23 October 1987 (aged 18)	0	0	Apprentice	22 April 2006	N/A
Defenders
2	Jason Crowe	RB	(England)	Sidcup	30 September 1978 (aged 27)	48	2	Grimsby Town	29 May 2005	Free
3	Fred Murray	CB/LB	(Republic of Ireland)	Clonmel	22 May 1982 (aged 23)	44	0	Cambridge United	18 July 2004	Undisclosed
4	Ashley Westwood	CB	(England)	Bridgnorth	31 August 1976 (aged 29)	35	2	Sheffield Wednesday	14 July 2003	Free
5	Luke Chambers	CB	(England)	Kettering	28 September 1985 (aged 20)	115	0	Apprentice	26 April 2003	N/A
6	Chris Doig	CB	(Scotland)	Dumfries	13 February 1981 (aged 25)	54	3	Nottingham Forest	30 June 2005	Free
15	Brett Johnson	CB/LB	(England)	Hammersmith	15 August 1985 (aged 20)	8	0	Aldershot Town	30 June 2005	Nominal
16	Sean Dyche	CB	(England)	Kettering	28 June 1971 (aged 34)	37	0	Watford	1 July 2005	Free
18	Gavin Johnson	LB	(England)	Stowmarket	10 October 1970 (aged 35)	26	1	Boston United	31 August 2005	Free
20	Pedj Bojic	RB	(Australia)	Sydney	9 April 1984 (aged 22)	85	6	Sydney Olympic	3 August 2004	Free
24	Liam Dolman	RB	(England)	Northampton	26 September 1987 (aged 18)	1	0	Apprentice	1 July 2005	N/A
26	Tom Bonner	CB	(England)	Camden	6 February 1988 (aged 18)	1	0	Apprentice	1 July 2005	N/A
Midfielders
7	Ian Taylor	CM	(England)	Birmingham	4 June 1968 (aged 37)	38	7	Derby County	30 June 2005	Free
10	Josh Low	RW	(Wales)	Bristol (ENG)	15 February 1979 (aged 27)	124	19	Oldham Athletic	30 July 2003	£165,000
11	Eoin Jess	CM	(Scotland)	Portsoy	13 December 1970 (aged 35)	45	1	Nottingham Forest	30 June 2005	Free
12	David Hunt	U	(England)	Dulwich	10 September 1982 (aged 23)	51	3	Leyton Orient	23 March 2005	Free
14	David Rowson	CM	(Scotland)	Aberdeen	14 September 1976 (aged 29)	77	2	Partick Thistle	1 July 2004	Free
17	Bradley Johnson	LM	(England)	Hackney	28 April 1987 (aged 19)	4	0	Cambridge United	16 May 2005	Free
19	Martin Smith	LM	(England)	Sunderland	13 November 1974 (aged 31)	127	29	Huddersfield Town	1 July 2003	Free
21	Jamie Hand	CM	(England)	Uxbridge	7 February 1984 (aged 22)	11	0	Fisher Athletic	13 February 2006	Loan
Forwards
8	Andy Kirk	FW	(Northern Ireland)	Belfast	29 May 1979 (aged 26)	59	17	Boston United	10 March 2005	£125,000
9	Scott McGleish	FW	(England)	Barnet	10 February 1974 (aged 32)	103	41	Colchester United	4 June 2004	Free
25	Scott Cross	FW	(England)	Northampton	30 October 1987 (aged 18)	6	2	Apprentice	28 December 2004	N/A
27	Jason Lee	FW	(England)	Forest Gate	9 May 1971 (aged 34)	11	1	Boston United	9 January 2006	Free
28	Ryan Gilligan	FW	(England)	Swindon	18 January 1987 (aged 19)	25	4	Watford	12 August 2005	Free

== Competitions ==
=== Football League Two ===
==== League table ====
Pos	Team	Pld	W	D	L	GF	GA	GD	Pts	Promotion, qualification or relegation
1	Carlisle United (C, P)	46	25	11	10	84	42	+42	86	Promotion to Football League One
2	Northampton Town (P)	46	22	17	7	63	37	+26	83	Promotion to Football League One
3	Leyton Orient (P)	46	22	15	9	67	51	+16	81	Promotion to Football League One
4	Grimsby Town	46	22	12	12	64	44	+20	78	Qualification for League Two play-offs
5	Cheltenham Town (O, P)	46	19	15	12	65	53	+12	72	Qualification for League Two play-offs

Rules for classification: In the Football League goals scored (GF) takes precedence over goal difference (GD).
(C) Champions; (O) Play-off winners; (P) Promoted

==== Results summary ====
Overall								Home						Away					
Pld	W	D	L	GF	GA	GD	Pts	W	D	L	GF	GA	GD	W	D	L	GF	GA	GD
46	22	17	7	63	37	+26	83	11	8	4	30	15	+15	11	9	3	33	22	+11

Last updated: 6 May 2006.

==== League position by match ====
Round	1	2	3	4	5	6	7	8	9	10	11	12	13	14	15	16	17	18	19	20	21	22	23	24	25	26	27	28	29	30	31	32	33	34	35	36	37	38	39	40	41	42	43	44	45	46
Ground	A	H	H	A	A	H	A	H	A	H	A	H	A	H	A	H	A	H	H	A	A	H	H	H	A	A	H	A	A	H	H	A	H	H	A	H	A	A	H	A	H	A	H	A	H	A
Result	D	L	D	D	W	W	D	D	W	L	W	D	D	W	L	D	D	W	D	D	W	W	W	L	D	W	W	D	W	D	W	L	D	W	W	L	L	W	W	W	D	W	W	W	W	D
Position	14	18	18	18	15	10	11	12	7	9	6	6	8	5	6	8	8	7	8	8	7	5	4	6	6	5	5	5	4	4	4	4	4	2	3	4	5	4	3	3	3	2	2	2	2	2

Updated to match(es) played on 30 June 2006. Source: BBC Sport
A = Away; H = Home; W = Win; D = Draw; L = Loss

==== Matches ====
Win Draw Loss

6 August 2005 1	Lincoln City	1–1	Northampton Town	Lincoln
15:00 BST	G.Birch 64'	Report	P.Bojic 53'	Stadium: Sincil Bank; Attendance: 5,397; Referee: Eddie Ilderton

9 August 2005 2	Northampton Town	1–2	Barnet	Northampton
19:45 BST	L.Dudfield 32'	Report	D.Sinclair 56'; N.Bailey 88'	Stadium: Sixfields Stadium; Attendance: 5,817; Referee: B Knight

13 August 2005 3	Northampton Town	0–0	Wrexham	Northampton
15:00 BST		Report		Stadium: Sixfields Stadium; Attendance: 5,075; Referee: Carl Boyeson

20 August 2005 4	Shrewsbury Town	1–1	Northampton Town	Shrewsbury
15:00 BST	D.Edwards 90'	Report	A.Kirk 80' (pen.)	Stadium: Gay Meadow; Attendance: 3,562; Referee: R Booth

27 August 2005 5	Carlisle United	0–1	Northampton Town	Carlisle
15:00 BST		Report	P.Bojic 37'	Stadium: Brunton Park; Attendance: 5,730; Referee: C Oliver

29 August 2005 6	Northampton Town	3–2	Boston United	Northampton
15:00 BST	A.Kirk 22'; I.Taylor 45'; J.Crowe 83'	Report	A.White 40'; I.Ross 86'	Stadium: Sixfields Stadium; Attendance: 5,012; Referee: Mick Russell

2 September 2005 7	Wycombe Wanderers	1–1	Northampton Town	High Wycombe
19:45 BST	M.Williamson 58'	Report	D.Hunt 31'	Stadium: Adams Park; Attendance: 5,650; Referee: Clive Penton

10 September 2005 8	Northampton Town	1–1	Bury	Northampton
15:00 BST	R.Gilligan 83'	Report	S.Whaley 26'	Stadium: Sixfields Stadium; Attendance: 5,147; Referee: Darren Deadman

17 September 2005 9	Macclesfield Town	1–4	Northampton Town	Macclesfield
15:00 BST	M.Bullock 62'	Report	S.McGleish 44' (pen.), 79'; I.Taylor 51'; J.Low 90'	Stadium: Moss Rose; Attendance: 2,014; Referee: S Dorr

24 September 2005 10	Northampton Town	1–2	Cheltenham Town	Northampton
15:00 BST	I.Taylor 30'	Report	K.Odejayi 20', 45'	Stadium: Sixfields Stadium; Attendance: 5,407; Referee: Mike Thorpe

27 September 2005 11	Rushden & Diamonds	1–3	Northampton Town	Irthlingborough
19:45 BST	D.Savage 63'	Report	R.Gilligan 9'; R.Gier 80' (o.g.); S.McGleish 84'	Stadium: Nene Park; Attendance: 5,211; Referee: Uriah Rennie

1 October 2005 12	Northampton Town	0–0	Darlington	Northampton
15:00 BST		Report		Stadium: Sixfields Stadium; Attendance: 5,182; Referee: Andy Penn

7 October 2005 13	Bristol Rovers	0–0	Northampton Town	Bristol
19:45 BST		Report		Stadium: Memorial Stadium; Attendance: 6,912; Referee: Mark Halsey

14 October 2005 14	Northampton Town	1–0	Oxford United	Northampton
19:45 BST	I.Taylor 74'	Report		Stadium: Sixfields Stadium; Attendance: 6,802; Referee: P Armstrong

22 October 2005 15	Stockport County	4–2	Northampton Town	Stockport
15:00 BST	T.Bramble 8', 62'; H.Singh 54'; K.Briggs 84'	Report	J.Mendes 18'; S.McGleish 31'; D.Hunt (red card) 34'	Stadium: Edgeley Park; Attendance: 4,150; Referee: Jon Moss

29 October 2005 16	Northampton Town	0–0	Grimsby Town	Northampton
15:00 BST		Report		Stadium: Sixfields Stadium; Attendance: 6,067; Referee: Pat Miller

12 November 2005 17	Chester City	0–0	Northampton Town	Chester
15:00 GMT		Report		Stadium: Deva Stadium; Attendance: 3,295; Referee: Phil Joslin

19 November 2005 18	Northampton Town	4–0	Bristol Rovers	Northampton
15:00 GMT	A.Kirk 34' (pen.), 43'; M.Smith 48'; P.Bojic 89'	Report		Stadium: Sixfields Stadium; Attendance: 5,716; Referee: Paul Robinson

26 November 2005 19	Northampton Town	1–1	Lincoln City	Northampton
13:00 GMT	J.Low 90'	Report	G.Birch 14'	Stadium: Sixfields Stadium; Attendance: 5,174; Referee: Andy D'Urso

6 December 2005 20	Torquay United	3–3	Northampton Town	Torquay
19:45 GMT	T.Bedeau 56' (pen.); J.Kuffour 82'; K.Hill 90'	Report	S.McGleish 21', 67'; J.Mendes 77'	Stadium: Plainmoor; Attendance: 2,010; Referee: Lee Probert

10 December 2005 21	Barnet	0–1	Northampton Town	High Barnet
15:00 GMT		Report	S.McGleish 48' (pen.)	Stadium: Underhill; Attendance: 2,544; Referee: Phil Crossley

17 December 2005 22	Northampton Town	1–0	Shrewsbury Town	Northampton
15:00 GMT	S.McGleish 50'	Report		Stadium: Sixfields Stadium; Attendance: 5,380; Referee: G Hegley

26 December 2005 23	Northampton Town	1–0	Mansfield Town	Northampton
15:00 GMT	D.Hunt 66'	Report		Stadium: Sixfields Stadium; Attendance: 6,112; Referee: S Dorr

31 December 2005 24	Northampton Town	0–1	Peterborough United	Northampton
12:00 GMT		Report	C.Plummer 9'	Stadium: Sixfields Stadium; Attendance: 7,023; Referee: K Hill

2 January 2006 25	Rochdale	1–1	Northampton Town	Rochdale
15:00 GMT	J.Low 71', o.g.'	Report	P.Bojic 49'	Stadium: Spotland; Attendance: 3,030; Referee: Phil Joslin

14 January 2006 26	Leyton Orient	1–2	Northampton Town	Leyton, London
15:00 GMT	D.McMahon 86'	Report	S.McGleish 35'; C.Doig 54'	Stadium: Brisbane Road; Attendance: 5,445; Referee: R Booth

21 January 2006 27	Northampton Town	5–0	Macclesfield Town	Northampton
15:00 GMT	I.Taylor 35', 89'; A.Kirk 38', 90'; S.McGleish 61'	Report		Stadium: Sixfields Stadium; Attendance: 5,428; Referee: Mike Thorpe

24 January 2006 28	Notts County	2–2	Northampton Town	Nottingham
19:45 GMT	D.Pipe 24'; L.Crooks 75'	Report	J.Crowe 69'; E.Jess 77'	Stadium: Meadow Lane; Attendance: 4,884; Referee: Darren Deadman
Note: Fixture was previously postponed on 28 December 2005 due to safety reasons.

28 January 2006 29	Bury	0–2	Northampton Town	Bury
15:00 GMT		Report	A.Parrish 29', o.g.' A.Kirk 40'	Stadium: Gigg Lane; Attendance: 2,456; Referee: Anthony Bates

31 January 2006 30	Northampton Town	0–0	Wycombe Wanderers	Northampton
19:45 GMT		Report		Stadium: Sixfields Stadium; Attendance: 6,438; Referee: Trevor Kettle

4 February 2006 31	Northampton Town	2–0	Rushden & Diamonds	Northampton
15:00 GMT	D.Hunt 11'; S.McGleish 86'	Report		Stadium: Sixfields Stadium; Attendance: 7,036; Referee: Phil Crossley

11 February 2006 32	Cheltenham Town	3–1	Northampton Town	Cheltenham
15:00 GMT	S.Guinan 38'; K.Odejayi 45'; JJ.Melligan 71' (pen.)	Report	S.McGleish 90'	Stadium: Whaddon Road; Attendance: 3,876; Referee: Pat Miller

14 February 2006 33	Northampton Town	1–1	Leyton Orient	Northampton
19:45 GMT	A.Kirk 8'	Report	J.Mackie 65'	Stadium: Sixfields Stadium; Attendance: 5,552; Referee: Neil Swarbrick

17 February 2006 34	Northampton Town	1–0	Torquay United	Northampton
19:45 GMT	I.Taylor 81'	Report		Stadium: Sixfields Stadium; Attendance: 5,636; Referee: Gary Sutton

25 February 2006 35	Wrexham	0–1	Northampton Town	Wrexham, Wales
15:00 GMT		Report	R.Gilligan 68'	Stadium: Racecourse Ground; Attendance: 5,012; Referee: Lee Probert

10 March 2006 36	Northampton Town	0–3	Carlisle United	Northampton
19:45 GMT		Report	K.Hawley 21'; M.Bridges 74'; D.Livesey 84'	Stadium: Sixfields Stadium; Attendance: 7,045; Referee: Martin Atkinson

18 March 2006 37	Mansfield Town	1–0	Northampton Town	Mansfield
15:00 GMT	R.Barker 65'	Report		Stadium: Field Mill; Attendance: 3,985; Referee: P Armstrong

22 March 2006 38	Boston United	0–1	Northampton Town	Boston
15:00 GMT		Report	G.Johnson 79'	Stadium: York Street; Attendance: 2,174; Referee: Neil Swarbrick

28 March 2006 39	Northampton Town	2–0	Notts County	Northampton
15:00 BST	J.Lee 39'; S.Dyche (red card) 50'; J.Low 90'	Report		Stadium: Sixfields Stadium; Attendance: 6,077; Referee: Gary Lewis

1 April 2006 40	Peterborough United	0–1	Northampton Town	Peterborough
15:00 BST		Report	S.McGleish 21'	Stadium: London Road; Attendance: 8,637; Referee: Andy Penn

8 April 2006 41	Northampton Town	2–2	Rochdale	Northampton
13:00 BST	J.Low 6'; S.McGleish 35'	Report	R.Lambert 51', 90' (pen.)	Stadium: Sixfields Stadium; Attendance: 5,732; Referee: J Singh

15 April 2006 42	Darlington	0–1	Northampton Town	Darlington
15:00 BST		Report	S.McGleish 70'	Stadium: Darlington Arena; Attendance: 5,220; Referee: Mike Pike

17 April 2006 43	Northampton Town	2–0	Stockport County	Northampton
15:00 BST	S.McGleish 54'; M.Smith 73'	Report		Stadium: Sixfields Stadium; Attendance: 6,544; Referee: M Fletcher

22 April 2006 44	Oxford United	1–3	Northampton Town	Oxford
15:00 BST	C.Willmott 75'	Report	C.Doig 16'; M.Smith 69'; J.Low 71'	Stadium: Kassam Stadium; Attendance: 8,264; Referee: Kevin Friend

29 April 2006 45	Northampton Town	1–0	Chester City	Northampton
15:00 BST	S.McGleish 26'	Report		Stadium: Sixfields Stadium; Attendance: 7,114; Referee: P Armstrong

6 May 2006 46	Grimsby Town	1–1	Northampton Town	Cleethorpes
15:00 BST	J.Kalala 75' (pen.)	Report	R.Gilligan 90'	Stadium: Blundell Park; Attendance: 8,458; Referee: P Taylor

=== FA Cup ===
5 November 2005 First round	Wycombe Wanderers	1–3	Northampton Town	High Wycombe
15:00 GMT	J.Burnell 90'	Report	C.Doig 56'; M.Smith 61'; S.McGleish 80'	Stadium: Adams Park; Attendance: 3,974; Referee: Mike Thorpe

3 December 2005 Second round	Stevenage Borough	2–2	Northampton Town	Stevenage
15:00 GMT	G.Boyd 5'; A.Elding 83'	Report	P.Bojić 67'; S.McGleish 82' (pen.)	Stadium: Broadhall Way; Attendance: 3,937; Referee: Darren Deadman

13 December 2005 Second round (r)	Northampton Town	2–0	Stevenage Borough	Northampton
19:45 GMT	S.McGleish 44', 45'	Report		Stadium: Sixfields Stadium; Attendance: 4,407; Referee: Darren Deadman

7 January 2006 Third round	Crystal Palace	4–1	Northampton Town	Selhurst, London
15:00 GMT	M.Hughes 4'; J.McAnuff 37'; A.Johnson 53' (pen.); D.Freedman 88' (pen.)	Report	Low 12'	Stadium: Selhurst Park; Attendance: 10,391; Referee: Iain Williamson

=== League Cup ===
23 August 2005 First round	Northampton Town	3–0	Queens Park Rangers	Northampton
19:45 BST	A.Kirk 19'; S.McGleish 62'; E.Sabin 90' (pen.)	Report		Stadium: Sixfields Stadium; Attendance: 3,974; Referee: Mike Thorpe

20 September 2005 Second round	Norwich City	2–0	Northampton Town	Norwich
19:45 BST	D.Huckerby 34' (pen.); D.Ashton 78'	Report		Stadium: Carrow Road; Attendance: 16,766; Referee: Colin Webster

=== League Trophy ===
18 October 2005 First round (s)	Northampton Town	5–2	Notts County	Northampton
19:45 BST	J.Mendes 15'; S.Cross 16', 22'; S.McGleish 87', 90'	Report	S.Long 3'; L.McMahon 57' (pen.)	Stadium: Sixfields Stadium; Attendance: 2,041; Referee: Jarnail Singh

23 November 2005 Second round (s)	Colchester United	3–2 (a.e.t.)	Northampton Town	Colchester
19:45 GMT	G.Elokobi 57'; R.Garcia 90'; N.Danns 101'	Report	A.Kirk 26'; P.Bojić 67'	Stadium: Layer Road; Attendance: 1,719; Referee: Clive Penton

=== Appearances, goals and cards ===
No.	Pos	Player	League Two			FA Cup			League Cup			League Trophy			Total			Discipline	
No.	Pos	Player	Starts	Sub	Goals	Starts	Sub	Goals	Starts	Sub	Goals	Starts	Sub	Goals	Starts	Sub	Goals	Booked	Sent off (straight red)
1	GK	Lee Harper	46	–	–	4	–	–	–	–	–	–	–	–	50	–	–	1	–
2	RB	Jason Crowe	41	–	2	3	–	–	2	–	–	–	2	–	46	2	2	8	–
3	LB	Fred Murray	–	–	–	–	–	–	–	–	–	–	–	–	–	–	–	–	–
4	CB	Ashley Westwood	–	3	–	–	–	–	–	–	–	–	–	–	–	3	–	–	–
5	CB	Luke Chambers	42	1	–	4	–	–	2	–	–	1	–	–	49	1	–	5	–
6	CB	Chris Doig	36	2	2	4	–	1	1	–	–	2	–	–	43	2	3	3	–
7	CM	Ian Taylor	33	–	7	3	–	–	1	–	–	1	–	–	38	–	7	5	–
8	ST	Andy Kirk	29	9	8	2	2	–	1	–	1	1	–	1	38	11	10	6	–
9	ST	Scott McGleish	39	3	17	4	–	4	2	–	1	1	1	2	46	4	24	2	–
10	RM	Josh Low	29	6	5	4	–	1	2	–	–	2	–	–	37	6	6	3	–
11	CM	Eoin Jess	35	3	1	4	–	–	2	–	–	–	1	–	41	4	1	2	–
12	U	David Hunt	35	5	3	2	2	–	1	–	–	1	–	–	39	7	3	4	1
13	GK	Mark Bunn	–	–	–	–	–	–	2	–	–	–	–	–	2	–	–	1	–
14	CM	David Rowson	13	16	–	1	1	–	1	–	–	2	–	–	17	17	–	2	–
15	CB	Brett Johnson	2	4	–	–	1	–	–	1	–	–	–	–	2	6	–	–	–
16	CB	Sean Dyche	34	1	–	–	1	–	2	–	–	–	–	–	36	1	–	5	1
17	CM	Bradley Johnson	1	2	–	–	–	–	–	–	–	1	–	–	2	2	–	1	–
18	LB	Gavin Johnson	22	2	1	–	1	–	1	–	–	–	–	–	23	3	1	2	–
19	LM	Martin Smith	22	4	3	3	–	1	–	–	–	1	–	–	26	4	4	3	–
20	RB	Pedj Bojic	18	18	4	4	–	1	1	–	–	2	–	1	25	18	6	2	1
21	CM	Jamie Hand	8	3	–	–	–	–	–	–	–	–	–	–	8	3	–	1	–
22	GK	Chris Dunn	–	–	–	–	–	–	–	–	–	–	–	–	–	–	–	–	–
23	RM	Matthew Gearing	–	–	–	–	–	–	–	–	–	–	–	–	–	–	–	–	–
24	RB	Liam Dolman	–	–	–	–	–	–	–	–	–	1	–	–	1	–	–	–	–
25	ST	Scott Cross	–	4	–	–	–	–	–	–	–	1	–	2	1	4	2	–	–
26	CB	Tom Bonner	–	–	–	–	–	–	–	–	–	–	1	–	–	1	–	–	–
27	ST	Jason Lee	8	3	1	–	–	–	–	–	–	–	–	–	8	3	1	2	–
28	ST	Ryan Gilligan	4	19	4	–	–	–	–	2	–	–	–	–	4	21	4	2	–
Players no longer at the club:
18	ST	Éric Sabin	4	2	–	–	–	–	–	1	1	–	–	–	4	3	1	–	–
21	LM	David Galbraith	1	3	–	–	–	–	–	1	–	1	1	–	2	5	–	1	–
27	ST	Lawrie Dudfield	2	4	1	–	–	–	–	1	–	–	–	–	2	5	1	–	–
27	ST	Petr Mikolanda	2	–	–	1	–	–	–	–	–	–	–	–	3	–	–	1	–
29	ST	Junior Mendes	9	3	2	2	2	–	–	–	–	2	–	1	13	5	3	–	–
31	GK	Michael Poke	–	–	–	–	–	–	–	–	–	2	–	–	2	–	–	–	–

=== Clean sheets ===
Includes all competitive matches.

As of match played 6 May 2006

No.	Nat.	Player	Matches Played	Clean Sheet %	League Two	FA Cup	League Cup	LDV	TOTAL
1	(England)	Lee Harper	50	48%	23	1	0	0	24
13	(England)	Mark Bunn	2	50%	0	0	1	0	1
31	(England)	Michael Poke	2	0%	0	0	0	0	0
Totals			54	46%	23	1	1	0	25
