= 2007–08 Northampton Town F.C. season =

Northampton Town
2007–08 season
- Chairman: David Cardoza
- Manager: Stuart Gray
- Stadium: Sixfields Stadium
- League One: 9th
- FA Cup: Second round
- League Cup: Second round
- League Trophy: First round
- Top goalscorer: League: Poul Hübertz (13); All: Poul Hübertz (13)
- Highest home attendance: 7,260 vs Leeds United
- Lowest home attendance: 1,735 vs Millwall

The 2007–08 season was Northampton Town's 111th season in their history and the second successive season in League One. Alongside competing in League One, the club also participated in the FA Cup, League Cup and Football League Trophy.

== Players ==
As of match played 3 May 2008.

No.	Name	Position	Nat.	Place of Birth	Date of Birth (Age)	Apps	Goals	Previous club	Date signed	Fee
Goalkeepers
1	Mark Bunn	GK	(England)	Kettering	16 November 1984 (aged 23)	101	0	Apprentice	21 August 2001	N/A
13	Chris Dunn	GK	(England)	Havering	23 October 1987 (aged 20)	1	0	Apprentice	22 April 2006	N/A
Defenders
2	Jason Crowe	RB	(England)	Sidcup	30 September 1978 (aged 29)	145	9	Grimsby Town	29 May 2005	Free
3	Danny Jackman	LB/LM	(England)	Worcester	3 January 1983 (aged 25)	44	1	Gillingham	24 May 2007	Free
4	Mark Hughes	CB	(England)	Kirkby	9 December 1986 (aged 21)	59	3	Everton	31 January 2007	Undisclosed
5	Gábor Gyepes	CB	(Hungary)	Budapest	26 June 1981 (aged 26)	13	0	Wolverhampton Wanderers	8 February 2008	Free
6	Chris Doig	CB	(Scotland)	Dumfries	13 February 1981 (aged 27)	115	4	Nottingham Forest	30 June 2005	Free
15	Brett Johnson	CB/LB	(England)	Hammersmith	15 August 1985 (aged 22)	32	0	Aldershot Town	30 June 2005	Nominal
16	Danny May	RB	(England)	Watford	19 November 1988 (aged 19)	6	0	Apprentice	6 October 2006	N/A
19	Liam Dolman	CB	(England)	Northampton	26 September 1987 (aged 20)	37	1	Apprentice	1 July 2005	N/A
21	Daniel Jones	LB/LM	(England)	Rowley Regis	23 December 1986 (aged 21)	39	3	Wolverhampton Wanderers	3 August 2007	Loan
24	Greg Taylor	RB	(England)	Bedford	15 January 1990 (aged 18)	0	0	Apprentice	1 July 2007	N/A
Midfielders
7	Giles Coke	CM	(England)	Westminster	3 June 1986 (aged 21)	20	5	Mansfield Town	2 July 2007	Tribunal
11	Andy Holt	LB/LM	(England)	Stockport	21 April 1978 (aged 30)	81	4	Wrexham	27 June 2006	Free
12	Ian Henderson	RM	(England)	Stockport	24 January 1985 (aged 23)	26	0	Norwich City	28 June 2007	Free
14	Joe Burnell	CM	(England)	Bristol	10 October 1980 (aged 27)	67	2	Wycombe Wanderers	7 June 2006	Free
18	Ryan Gilligan	CM	(England)	Swindon	18 January 1987 (aged 21)	94	8	Watford	12 August 2005	Free
20	Alex Dyer	CM	(England)	Täby (SWE)	11 June 1990 (aged 17)	9	1	Apprentice	1 July 2007	N/A
Forwards
9	Colin Larkin	FW	(Republic of Ireland)	Dundalk	27 April 1982 (aged 26)	40	3	Chesterfield	28 June 2007	Free
10	Adebayo Akinfenwa	FW	(England)	Islington	10 May 1982 (aged 25)	15	7	Millwall	18 January 2008	Free
23	Poul Hübertz	FW	(Denmark)	Roskilde	21 September 1976 (aged 31)	47	13	Millwall	8 August 2007	Free

== Competitions ==
=== Football League One ===
==== League table ====
Pos	Team	Pld	W	D	L	GF	GA	GD	Pts
7	Brighton & Hove Albion	46	19	12	15	58	50	+8	69
8	Oldham Athletic	46	18	13	15	58	46	+12	67
9	Northampton Town	46	17	15	14	60	55	+5	66
10	Huddersfield Town	46	20	6	20	50	62	−12	66
11	Tranmere Rovers	46	18	11	17	52	47	+5	65

Updated to match(es) played on unknown. Source: The Football League
Rules for classification: 1) points; 2) goal difference; 3) number of goals scored.

==== Results summary ====
Overall								Home						Away					
Pld	W	D	L	GF	GA	GD	Pts	W	D	L	GF	GA	GD	W	D	L	GF	GA	GD
46	17	15	14	60	55	+5	66	12	6	5	38	21	+17	5	9	9	22	34	−12

Last updated: May 2008.

==== League position by match ====
Round	1	2	3	4	5	6	7	8	9	10	11	12	13	14	15	16	17	18	19	20	21	22	23	24	25	26	27	28	29	30	31	32	33	34	35	36	37	38	39	40	41	42	43	44	45	46
Ground	H	A	H	A	H	A	H	A	A	H	A	H	A	H	H	A	H	A	H	A	H	A	A	H	A	H	A	H	H	A	H	A	H	A	H	A	A	H	H	A	A	H	A	H	A	H
Result	D	L	L	D	W	D	W	D	L	W	L	W	W	L	L	L	L	L	D	D	W	L	W	D	L	D	W	W	W	D	D	L	W	W	D	W	D	W	L	L	D	W	D	W	D	W
Position	9	16	19	22	11	15	11	11	15	13	15	12	10	12	15	15	17	19	18	18	15	17	16	16	16	18	14	13	11	11	12	14	12	10	11	10	12	11	11	12	12	11	11	10	11	9

Source: Northampton Town F.C.
A = Away; H = Home; W = Win; D = Draw; L = Loss

==== Matches ====
Win Draw Loss

11 August 2007 1	Northampton Town	1–1	Swindon Town	Northampton
15:00 BST	A.Kirk 9'	Report	C.Roberts 44' (pen.)	Stadium: Sixfields Stadium; Attendance: 6,210; Referee: Clive Penton

18 August 2007 2	Brighton & Hove Albion	2–1	Northampton Town	Brighton
15:00 BST	D.Hammond 2' (pen.); A.Revell 66'	Report	A.Kirk 23'	Stadium: Withdean Stadium; Attendance: 5,137; Referee: Mike Thorpe

25 August 2007 3	Northampton Town	1–2	Yeovil Town	Northampton
15:00 BST	P.Hübertz 32'	Report	J.Cochrane 26'; L.Owusu 90'	Stadium: Sixfields Stadium; Attendance: 4,555; Referee: Paul Taylor

1 September 2007 4	Leyton Orient	2–2	Northampton Town	Leyton, London
15:00 BST	A.Chambers 52'; T.Mkandawire 57'	Report	P.Hübertz 15'; C.Doig 19'	Stadium: Brisbane Road; Attendance: 5,170; Referee: Andre Marriner

7 September 2007 5	Northampton Town	2–0	Doncaster Rovers	Northampton
19:45 BST	R.Gilligan 50'; A.Kirk 71'	Report		Stadium: Sixfields Stadium; Attendance: 5,274; Referee: Rob Shoebridge

15 September 2007 6	Bournemouth	1–1	Northampton Town	Bournemouth
15:00 BST	D.Anderton 34'	Report	C.Larkin 78'	Stadium: Dean Court; Attendance: 5,009; Referee: Danny McDermid

22 September 2007 7	Northampton Town	3–0	Huddersfield Town	Northampton
15:00 BST	P.Hübertz 44'; A.Holt 62'; A.Kirk 66'	Report		Stadium: Sixfields Stadium; Attendance: 5,014; Referee: Andy Penn

29 September 2007 8	Tranmere Rovers	2–2	Northampton Town	Birkenhead
15:00 BST	C.Shuker 69'; G.Taylor 88'	Report	A.Kirk 12'; P.Hübertz 39'	Stadium: Prenton Park; Attendance: 6,338; Referee: Mike Pike

2 October 2007 9	Millwall	2–0	Northampton Town	Millwall, London
19:45 BST	A.Dunne 12'; P.Robinson 31'	Report		Stadium: The Den; Attendance: 6,520; Referee: Darren Deadman

6 October 2007 10	Northampton Town	2–1	Port Vale	Northampton
15:00 BST	A.Kirk 19', 33'	Report	D.McGoldrick 55'	Stadium: Sixfields Stadium; Attendance: 4,755; Referee: Steve Bratt

15 October 2007 11	Luton Town	4–1	Northampton Town	Luton
19:45 BST	D.Currie 4'; M.Spring 49' (pen.), 90' (pen.); P.Furlong 62'	Report	B.Johnson 23'	Stadium: Kenilworth Road; Attendance: 5,881; Referee: Jonathan Moss
Note: Live on Sky Sports

20 October 2007 12	Northampton Town	2–1	Cheltenham Town	Northampton
15:00 BST	A.Kirk 22'; R.Gilligan 80'	Report	D.Spencer 50'	Stadium: Sixfields Stadium; Attendance: 5,012; Referee: Grant Hegley

27 October 2007 13	Oldham Athletic	0–1	Northampton Town	Oldham
15:00 BST		Report	A.Russell 66'	Stadium: Boundary Park; Attendance: 4,870; Referee: Tony Bates

3 November 2007 14	Northampton Town	0–1	Southend United	Northampton
15:00 GMT		Report	A.Barrett 65'	Stadium: Sixfields Stadium; Attendance: 6,646; Referee: Roger East

6 November 2007 15	Northampton Town	0–1	Bristol Rovers	Northampton
19:45 GMT		Report	R.Lambert 70'	Stadium: Sixfields Stadium; Attendance: 5,126; Referee: Anthony Taylor

17 November 2007 16	Crewe Alexandra	1–0	Northampton Town	Crewe
15:00 GMT	R.Lowe 59'	Report		Stadium: Gresty Road; Attendance: 4,531; Referee: Andy Haines

24 November 2007 17	Northampton Town	0–2	Walsall	Northampton
15:00 GMT		Report	M.Bradley 45'; I.Demontagnac 86'	Stadium: Sixfields Stadium; Attendance: 5,767; Referee: Darren Drysdale

4 December 2007 18	Swansea City	3–0	Northampton Town	Swansea, Wales
19:45 GMT	J.Scotland 16', 66' (pen.); D.Pratley 19'	Report		Stadium: Liberty Stadium; Attendance: 10,957; Referee: Steven Cook

8 December 2007 19	Northampton Town	2–2	Carlisle United	Northampton
15:00 GMT	J.Crowe 28'; B.Johnson 90'		M.Bridge-Wilkinson 26'; J.Garner 63'	Stadium: Sixfields Stadium; Attendance: 4,908; Referee: Trevor Kettle

15 December 2007 20	Nottingham Forest	2–2	Northampton Town	Nottingham
15:00 GMT	L.McGugan 15'; J.Agogo 90'	Report	P.Hübertz 59'; D.Jones 65'	Stadium: City Ground; Attendance: 17,081; Referee: Clive Penton

21 December 2007 21	Northampton Town	4–1	Bournemouth	Northampton
19:45 GMT	D.Bowditch 4'; J.Crowe 43'; D.Jones 50'; B.Johnson 67'	Report	B.Pitman 5'	Stadium: Sixfields Stadium; Attendance: 4,806; Referee: Carl Boyeson

26 December 2007 22	Doncaster Rovers	2–0	Northampton Town	Doncaster
15:00 GMT	M.McCammon 11'; A.Lockwood 29'	Report		Stadium: Keepmoat Stadium; Attendance: 7,046; Referee: Michael Oliver

29 December 2007 23	Huddersfield Town	1–2	Northampton Town	Huddersfield
15:00 GMT	A.Booth 45'	Report	P.Hübertz 71'; J.Crowe 85'	Stadium: Kirklees Stadium; Attendance: 8,566; Referee: Eddie Ilderton

1 January 2008 24	Northampton Town	1–1	Millwall	Northampton
15:00 GMT	D.Bowditch 37'; P.Hübertz (red card) 81'	Report	N.Harris (red card) 82'; G.Alexander 90'	Stadium: Sixfields Stadium; Attendance: 5,329; Referee: Graham Horwood

5 January 2008 25	Leeds United	3–0	Northampton Town	Leeds
15:00 GMT	F.Richardson 43'; R.Marques 52'; C.Weston 90'	Report		Stadium: Elland Road; Attendance: 24,472; Referee: Graham Salisbury

12 January 2008 26	Northampton Town	1–1	Hartlepool United	Northampton
15:00 GMT	L.Dolman 16'	Report	B.Clark 45'	Stadium: Sixfields Stadium; Attendance: 4,639; Referee: Mike Russell

19 January 2008 27	Gillingham	0–1	Northampton Town	Gillingham
15:00 GMT		Report	D.Jones 3'	Stadium: Priestfield Stadium; Attendance: 5,579; Referee: Andy D' Urso

25 January 2008 28	Northampton Town	2–0	Leyton Orient	Northampton
19:45 GMT	G.Coke 14'; P.Hübertz 78' (pen.)	Report		Stadium: Sixfields Stadium; Attendance: 5,405; Referee: Jarnail Singh

29 January 2008 29	Northampton Town	1–0	Brighton & Hove Albion	Northampton
19:45 GMT	M.Hughes 44'	Report		Stadium: Sixfields Stadium; Attendance: 4,657; Referee: Danny McDermid

2 February 2008 30	Swindon Town	1–1	Northampton Town	Swindon
15:00 GMT	B.Sturrock 56'	Report	A.Akinfenwa 87'	Stadium: County Ground; Attendance: 7,375; Referee: Steve Bratt

9 February 2008 31	Northampton Town	1–1	Leeds United	Northampton
15:00 GMT	A.Akinfenwa 75'	Report	J.Howson 38'	Stadium: Sixfields Stadium; Attendance: 7,260; Referee: Steve Tanner

12 February 2008 32	Yeovil Town	1–0	Northampton Town	Yeovil
19:45 GMT	T.Skiverton 90'	Report		Stadium: Huish Park; Attendance: 5,001; Referee: Paul Melin

16 February 2008 33	Northampton Town	4–0	Gillingham	Northampton
15:00 GMT	J.Crowe 44'; A.Akinfenwa 45', 53'; G.Coke 64'	Report		Stadium: Sixfields Stadium; Attendance: 4,978; Referee: Scott Mathieson

22 February 2008 34	Hartlepool United	0–1	Northampton Town	Hartlepool
19:45 GMT		Report	G.Coke 82'	Stadium: Victoria Park; Attendance: 3,945; Referee: Phil Joslin

1 March 2008 35	Northampton Town	0–0	Crewe Alexandra	Northampton
15:00 GMT		Report		Stadium: Sixfields Stadium; Attendance: 5,507; Referee: Mark Haywood

8 March 2008 36	Walsall	0–2	Northampton Town	Walsall
15:00 GMT		Report	A.Akinfenwa 8', 71'	Stadium: Bescot Stadium; Attendance: 6,844; Referee: Andy Haines

12 March 2008 37	Bristol Rovers	1–1	Northampton Town	Bristol
19:45 GMT	S.Rigg 45'	Report	P.Hübertz 55'	Stadium: Memorial Stadium; Attendance: 4,657; Referee: Ray Lee

15 March 2008 38	Northampton Town	4–2	Swansea City	Northampton
15:00 GMT	P.Hübertz 14', 23' (pen.); A.Tate 20' (o.g.); D.Jackman 52'	Report	J.Scotland 29', 83'	Stadium: Sixfields Stadium; Attendance: 5,926; Referee: Jonathan Moss

21 March 2008 39	Northampton Town	1–2	Nottingham Forest	Northampton
19:45 GMT	P.Hübertz 32'	Report	B.Ormerod 9'; J.Perch (red card) 21'; N.Tyson 63' (pen.)	Stadium: Sixfields Stadium; Attendance: 7,244; Referee: Rob Styles

24 March 2008 40	Carlisle United	2–0	Northampton Town	Carlisle
15:00 GMT	D.Livesey 50'; M.Bridge-Wilkinson 84'	Report		Stadium: Brunton Park; Attendance: 9,038; Referee: Neil Swarbrick

29 March 2008 41	Cheltenham Town	1–1	Northampton Town	Cheltenham
15:00 GMT	S.Gillespie 39'	Report	G.Coke 76'	Stadium: Whaddon Road; Attendance: 4,024; Referee: Karl Evans

5 April 2008 42	Northampton Town	2–1	Luton Town	Northampton
15:00 BST	P.Hübertz 34' (pen.); A.Dyer 41'	Report	S.Parkin 90'	Stadium: Sixfields Stadium; Attendance: 5,132; Referee: Kevin Friend

12 April 2008 43	Southend United	1–1	Northampton Town	Southend-on-Sea
15:00 BST	L.Barnard 51'	Report	C.Larkin 24'	Stadium: Roots Hall; Attendance: 9,286; Referee: Darren Deadman

19 April 2008 44	Northampton Town	2–0	Oldham Athletic	Northampton
15:00 BST	G.Coke 51'; R.Gilligan 64'	Report		Stadium: Sixfields Stadium; Attendance: 5,171; Referee: Darren Drysdale

26 April 2008 45	Port Vale	2–2	Northampton Town	Burslem
15:00 BST	M.Richards 30'; D.Glover 49'	Report	R.Gilligan 24'; A.Holt 27'	Stadium: Vale Park; Attendance: 4,556; Referee: Roger East

3 May 2008 46	Northampton Town	2–1	Tranmere Rovers	Northampton
15:00 BST	A.Akinfenwa 3'; P.Hübertz 68'	Report	C.Greenacre 43'; I.Goodison (red card) 80'	Stadium: Sixfields Stadium; Attendance: 5,088; Referee: Gavin Ward

=== FA Cup ===
10 November 2018 First round	Darlington	1–1	Northampton Town	Darlington
15:00 GMT	G.Blundell 8'	Report	C.Larkin 26'	Stadium: Darlington Arena; Attendance: 2,964; Referee: Karl Evans

20 November 2018 First round (r)	Northampton Town	2–1	Darlington	Northampton
19:45 GMT	A.Kirk 36'; B.Johnson 41'	Report	T.Wright 26'	Stadium: Sixfields Stadium; Attendance: 2,895; Referee: Paul Melin

1 December 2018 Second round	Northampton Town	1–1	Walsall	Northampton
15:00 GMT	A.Kirk 8'	Report	T.Mooney 4'	Stadium: Sixfields Stadium; Attendance: 3,887; Referee: Michael Jones

11 December 2018 Second round (r)	Walsall	1–0	Northampton Town	Walsall
19:45 GMT	M.Ricketts 85' (pen.)	Report		Stadium: Bescott Stadium; Attendance: 3,066; Referee: Rob Shoebridge

=== League Cup ===
14 August 2007 First round	Northampton Town	2–0	Millwall	Northampton
19:45 BST	B.Johnson 38'; A.Kirk 62'	Report		Stadium: Sixfields Stadium; Attendance: 1,735; Referee: Mike Russell

29 August 2007 Second round	Middlesbrough	2–0	Northampton Town	Middlesbrough
20:00 BST	F.Rochemback 53'; L.Dong-gook 66'	Report		Stadium: Riverside Stadium; Attendance: 11,686; Referee: Neil Swarbrick

=== League Trophy ===
4 September 2007 First round (s)	Luton Town	2–0	Northampton Town	Luton
19:45 BST	D.Hutchison 12'; P.Peschisolido 48'	Report		Stadium: Kenilworth Road; Attendance: 2,532; Referee: Ray Lee

=== Appearances, goals and cards ===
No.	Pos	Player	League One			FA Cup			League Cup			League Trophy			Total			Discipline	
No.	Pos	Player	Starts	Sub	Goals	Starts	Sub	Goals	Starts	Sub	Goals	Starts	Sub	Goals	Starts	Sub	Goals	Yellow card	Red card
1	GK	Mark Bunn	45	–	–	4	–	–	2	–	–	1	–	–	52	–	–	6	–
2	RB	Jason Crowe	44	–	4	3	–	–	2	–	–	–	1	–	49	1	4	8	–
3	LB	Danny Jackman	34	5	1	4	–	–	1	–	–	–	–	–	39	5	1	2	–
4	CB	Mark Hughes	34	1	1	4	–	–	2	–	–	1	–	–	41	1	1	8	–
5	CB	Gábor Gyepes	13	–	–	–	–	–	–	–	–	–	–	–	13	–	–	2	–
6	CB	Chris Doig	15	–	1	1	–	–	2	–	–	1	–	–	19	–	1	1	–
7	CM	Giles Coke	11	9	5	–	–	–	–	–	–	–	–	–	11	9	5	3	–
9	ST	Colin Larkin	14	19	2	4	–	1	–	2	–	1	–	–	19	21	3	–	–
10	ST	Adebayo Akinfenwa	13	2	7	–	–	–	–	–	–	–	–	–	13	2	7	2	–
11	LM	Andy Holt	29	7	2	4	–	–	2	–	–	–	–	–	35	7	2	1	–
12	RM	Ian Henderson	9	14	–	1	1	–	2	–	–	–	–	–	12	14	–	3	–
13	GK	Chris Dunn	1	–	–	–	–	–	–	–	–	–	–	–	1	–	–	–	–
14	CM	Joe Burnell	26	7	–	3	1	–	1	–	–	–	–	–	30	8	–	2	–
15	CB	Brett Johnson	10	6	–	–	–	–	–	2	–	–	–	–	10	8	–	1	–
16	RB	Danny May	–	2	–	–	–	–	–	–	–	1	–	–	1	2	–	–	–
18	CM	Ryan Gilligan	28	10	4	3	–	–	1	–	–	–	1	–	32	11	4	11	–
19	CB	Liam Dolman	27	3	1	4	–	–	–	–	–	1	–	–	32	3	1	4	–
20	CM	Alex Dyer	3	3	1	–	1	–	1	–	–	1	–	–	5	4	1	–	–
21	LB	Daniel Jones	27	6	3	1	2	–	1	1	–	1	–	–	30	9	3	9	–
23	ST	Poul Hübertz	33	7	13	4	–	–	2	–	–	1	–	–	40	7	13	8	1
24	RB	Greg Taylor	–	–	–	–	–	–	–	–	–	–	–	–	–	–	–	–	–
Players no longer at the club:
5	CB	Guy Branston	3	–	–	–	1	–	–	–	–	–	–	–	4	3	1	1	–
8	ST	Andy Kirk	25	–	8	2	1	2	1	–	1	–	1	–	28	2	11	3	–
10	W	Sam Aiston	–	1	–	–	1	–	–	1	–	–	–	–	–	3	–	–	–
17	CM	Bradley Johnson	22	1	3	2	1	1	2	–	1	1	–	–	27	2	5	4	–
17	W	Jonny Hayes	5	6	–	–	–	–	–	–	–	–	–	–	5	6	–	–	–
22	RB	Mark Little	17	–	–	–	–	–	–	–	–	–	–	–	17	–	–	3	–
22	CM	Alex Russell	11	2	1	–	–	–	–	–	–	1	–	–	12	2	1	–	–
25	ST	Dean Bowditch	7	3	2	–	–	–	–	–	–	2	–	–	7	3	2	–	–
