= Scott Cross =

Scott Cross may refer to:

- Scott Cross (film director), American producer, actor, writer, and entrepreneur
- Scott Cross (footballer) (born 1987), English footballer
- Scott Cross (basketball) (born 1974), American college basketball coach
