= 2002–03 Football League Trophy =

LDV Vans Trophy

Tournament details
- Country: England; Wales
- Teams: 60

Final positions
- Champions: Bristol City
- Runners-up: Carlisle United

Tournament statistics
- Matches played: 61
- Goals scored: 219 (3.59 per match)

The 2002–03 Football League Trophy, known as the 2002–03 LDV Vans Trophy for sponsorship reasons, was the 22nd staging of the Football League Trophy, a knock-out competition for English football clubs in Second and Third Division. The winners were Bristol City and the runners-up were Carlisle United.

The competition began on 22 October 2002 and ended with the final on 6 April 2003 at the Millennium Stadium.

In the first round, there were two sections: North and South. In the following rounds each section gradually eliminates teams in knock-out fashion until each has a winning finalist. At this point, the two winning finalists face each other in the combined final for the honour of the trophy. In addition to the 48 League teams, 12 teams from the Football Conference were also invited to participate in the competition.

== First round ==
=== Northern Section ===
Barnsley and Macclesfield Town were given byes to the second round.

Date	Home team	Score	Away team
22 October	Chesterfield	2–0	Halifax Town
22 October	Lincoln City	4–3	York City
22 October	Mansfield Town	0–4	Crewe Alexandra
22 October	Notts County	2–3	Wigan Athletic
22 October	Oldham Athletic	3–4	Carlisle United
22 October	Port Vale	3–1	Hull City
22 October	Rochdale	0–1	Bury
22 October	Scarborough	1–2	Doncaster Rovers
22 October	Scunthorpe United	2–3	Blackpool
22 October	Shrewsbury Town	3–0	Morecambe
22 October	Southport	3–4	Leigh RMI
22 October	Stockport County	1–0	Darlington
22 October	Tranmere Rovers	5–0	Hartlepool United
22 October	Wrexham	2–1	Huddersfield Town

=== Southern Section ===
Cardiff City and Brentford were given byes to the second round.

Date	Home team	Score	Away team
22 October	Cambridge United	4–0	Rushden & Diamonds
22 October	Cheltenham Town	4–1	Colchester United
22 October	Chester City	1–2	Plymouth Argyle
22 October	Dagenham & Redbridge	1–3	Kidderminster Harriers
22 October	Exeter City	1–0	Bristol Rovers
22 October	Hereford United	3–4	Northampton Town
22 October	Leyton Orient	3–2	Peterborough United
22 October	Oxford United	2–3	Bournemouth
22 October	Queens Park Rangers	0–0	Bristol City
Bristol City won 5-4 on penalties
22 October	Stevenage	2–1	Swansea City
22 October	Swindon Town	6–1	Southend United
22 October	Torquay United	0–4	Wycombe Wanderers
22 October	Woking	0–2	Luton Town
23 October	Boston United	4–2	Yeovil Town

== Second round ==
=== Northern Section ===
Date	Home team	Score	Away team
12 November	Bury	1–0	Barnsley
12 November	Carlisle United	1–0	Stockport County
12 November	Crewe Alexandra	2–0	Blackpool
12 November	Leigh RMI	3–4	Wrexham
12 November	Lincoln City	1–2	Shrewsbury Town
12 November	Macclesfield Town	1–2	Tranmere Rovers
12 November	Port Vale	1–1	Chesterfield
Port Vale won 4-3 on penalties
12 November	Wigan Athletic	0–1	Doncaster Rovers

=== Southern Section ===
Date	Home team	Score	Away team
12 November	Bournemouth	1–0	Leyton Orient
12 November	Cheltenham Town	1–2	Wycombe Wanderers
12 November	Exeter City	0–3	Cardiff City
12 November	Kidderminster Harriers	3–2	Swindon Town
12 November	Northampton Town	2–4	Cambridge United
12 November	Plymouth Argyle	0–1	Brentford
12 November	Stevenage	3–4	Luton Town
13 November	Boston United	1–2	Bristol City

== Quarter-finals ==
=== Northern Section ===
Date	Home team	Score	Away team
10 December	Bury	2–0	Tranmere Rovers
10 December	Carlisle United	2–0	Wrexham
10 December	Crewe Alexandra	8–0	Doncaster Rovers
10 December	Shrewsbury Town	2–1	Port Vale

=== Southern Section ===
Date	Home team	Score	Away team
10 December	Bournemouth	2–1	Cardiff City
10 December	Brentford	2–1	Kidderminster Harriers
10 December	Luton Town	1–2	Cambridge United
11 December	Bristol City	3–0	Wycombe Wanderers

== Area semi-finals ==
=== Northern Section ===
Date	Home team	Score	Away team
21 January	Carlisle United	3–2	Bury
29 January	Shrewsbury Town	4–2	Crewe Alexandra

=== Southern Section ===
Date	Home team	Score	Away team
21 January	Bournemouth	1–3	Bristol City
21 January	Brentford	1–2	Cambridge United

== Area finals ==
=== Northern Area final ===
25 February 2003

Carlisle United	1–0	Shrewsbury Town
Rundle 22'	Report

Brunton Park, Carlisle
Attendance: 5,163
4 March 2003

Shrewsbury Town	0–0	Carlisle United
	Report

Gay Meadow, Shrewsbury
Attendance: 6,273

=== Southern Area final ===
18 February 2003

Bristol City	4–2	Cambridge United
Doherty 21'; Burnell 64'; Murray 67'; Robins 77'	Report	Kitson 34', 54'

Ashton Gate Stadium, Bristol
Attendance: 7,173
25 February 2003

Cambridge United	0–3	Bristol City
	Report	Carey 11'; Murray 45'; Roberts 80'

Abbey Stadium, Cambridge
Attendance: 3,956

== Final ==
6 April 2003
13:30 BST

Bristol City	2–0	Carlisle United
Peacock 78'; Rosenior 89'	Report

Millennium Stadium, Cardiff
Attendance: 50,913
Referee: Peter Walton (Northamptonshire)

Bristol City	Carlisle United

GK	1	Steve Phillips
DF	2	Louis Carey
DF	5	Tony Butler
DF	19	Danny Coles
DF	3	Michael Bell	(substituted off) 85'
MF	7	Scott Murray
MF	8	Joe Burnell	Booked
MF	4	Tommy Doherty (c)
MF	11	Brian Tinnion	(substituted off) 81'
MF	18	Christian Roberts	(substituted off) 62'
FW	10	Lee Peacock
Substitutes:
GK	14	Mike Stowell
DF	6	Matt Hill	(substituted on) 85'
DF	26	Liam Rosenior	(substituted on) 62'
MF	12	Aaron Brown	(substituted on) 81'
FW	9	Peter Beadle
Manager:
Danny Wilson

GK	27	Matt Glennon
DF	5	Brian Shelley
DF	4	Paul Raven
DF	15	Darren Kelly	Booked	(substituted off) 80'
DF	7	Peter Murphy
MF	24	Jon McCarthy
MF	17	Stuart Green
MF	25	Mark Summerbell	(substituted off) 85'
FW	33	Adam Rundle
FW	9	Richie Foran	Booked
FW	34	Craig Farrell	(substituted off) 75'
Substitute:
DF	3	Lee Maddison	(substituted on) 80'
DF	13	Willo McDonagh	(substituted on) 85'
MF	20	Brendan McGill
FW	11	Brian Wake	(substituted on) 75'
FW	26	Craig Russell
Manager:
Roddy Collins

MATCH RULES

- 90 minutes.
- 30 minutes of extra-time if necessary.
- Penalty shoot-out if scores still level.
- Maximum of 3 substitutions.

== Notes ==
General

- statto.com

Specific
