= Brett Johnson (footballer, born 1985) =

English footballer

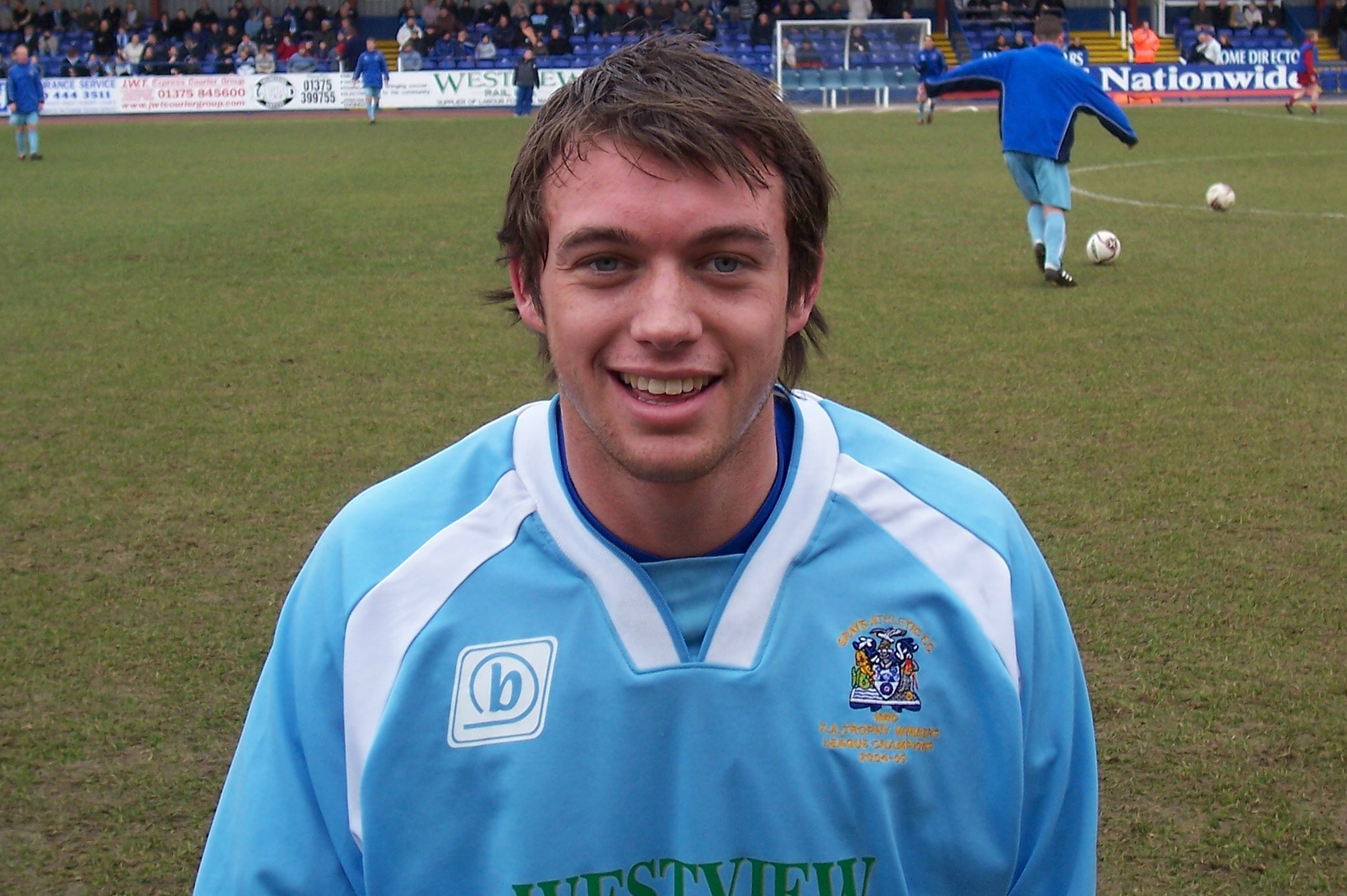
- Johnson while with Grays Athletic in 2006.

Personal information
- Full name: Brett Johnson
- Date of birth: 15 August 1985 (age 41)
- Place of birth: Hammersmith, England
- Height: 1.83 m (6 ft 0 in)
- Position: Defender

Senior career*
Years	Team	Apps	(Gls)
2002–2004	Ashford Town (Middlesex)		
2004–2005	Aldershot Town	35	(2)
2005–2008	Northampton Town	27	(0)
2005	→ Gravesend & Northfleet (loan)	4	(0)
2006	→ Grays Athletic (loan)	5	(0)
2008–2009	Brentford	10	(0)
2009–2012	AFC Wimbledon	79	(6)
2012	→ Cambridge United (loan)	2	(0)
2012–2014	Woking	61	(5)
2014–2017	Margate	76	(1)
- * Club domestic league appearances and goals

Brett Johnson (born 15 August 1985) is an English semi-professional footballer who played in the Football League for Northampton Town, AFC Wimbledon and Brentford. He was adept as a left-sided central defender or as a left back. He played under manager Terry Brown at Aldershot Town, AFC Wimbledon and Margate.

== Career ==
=== Early years and Football League (2002–2009) ===
A defender, Johnson began his career with Isthmian League club Ashford Town (Middlesex) and transferred to Conference club Aldershot Town on 6 February 2004. He was a part of the team which reached the Conference Premier play-off semi-finals at the end of the 2004–05 season and earned a move to League Two club Northampton Town on 1 July 2005. Johnson's time at Sixfields was hampered by persistent hamstring injuries and despite spells away on loan in non-League football to gain fitness, he managed just 13 appearances before his contract expired at the end of the 2006–07 season. He signed successive six-month contracts to remain with the club for the duration of the 2007–08 season and made something of a breakthrough, making 18 appearances.

By the time of his release in June 2008, Johnson had made just 31 appearances during three seasons with Northampton Town. He dropped back down to League Two to join Brentford, the club he supports, on a one-year contract in August 2008. He made just 12 appearances during an injury-hit season and was released in June 2009, but he did win a League Two promotion medal.

=== AFC Wimbledon and return to non-League football (2009–2017) ===
In August 2009, Johnson dropped into the Conference Premier to join AFC Wimbledon. Despite suffering from further injuries, he was part of the team which clinched promotion to the Football League for the first time in the club's history with victory in the 2011 Conference Premier play-off final. Johnson made 23 appearances in the Dons' debut season in League Two, but he spent time away on loan at Conference Premier club Cambridge United and was released in June 2012, after having made 94 appearances and scored six goals during three seasons at Kingsmeadow.

On 1 August 2012, Johnson dropped back into non-League football to join Woking, where he remained for two seasons and won the 2013–14 Surrey Senior Cup. A three-season spell with Margate followed (which included victory in the 2015 Isthmian League Premier Division play-off Final to win promotion to the National League South) in which he captained the team, but a combined torn cruciate, meniscus, medial ligament and fractured fibula injury suffered in a collision with his own goalkeeper in February 2017 forced him to take a break from football.

== Personal life ==
Johnson is a Brentford supporter. In 2012, after returning to part-time football, he began studying to be a taxi driver. By May 2018, he was working as a self-employed taxi driver.

== Career statistics ==
Appearances and goals by club, season and competition
Club	Season	League			FA Cup		League Cup		Other		Total	
Club	Season	Division	Apps	Goals	Apps	Goals	Apps	Goals	Apps	Goals	Apps	Goals
Aldershot Town	2003–04	Conference	6	0	—		—		—		6	0
Aldershot Town	2004–05	Conference Premier	29	2	1	0	—		2 (Note: Appearances in Conference Premier play-offs)	0	32	2
Aldershot Town	Total		35	2	1	0	—		2	0	38	2
Northampton Town	2005–06	League Two	6	0	1	0	1	0	0	0	8	0
Northampton Town	2006–07	League One	5	0	0	0	0	0	1 (Note: Appearance in Football League Trophy)	0	6	0
Northampton Town	2007–08	League One	16	0	0	0	2	0	0	0	18	0
Northampton Town	Total		27	0	1	0	2	0	1	0	31	0
Gravesend & Northfleet (loan)	2005–06	Conference Premier	4	0	—		—		—		4	0
Grays Athletic (loan)	2005–06	Conference Premier	5	0	—		—		—		5	0
Brentford	2008–09	League Two	10	0	0	0	2	0	1	0	12	0
AFC Wimbledon	2009–10	Conference Premier	38	1	3	0	—		3 (Note: 2 appearances in FA Trophy, 1 appearance in London Senior Cup)	0	44	1
AFC Wimbledon	2010–11	Conference Premier	23	5	1	0	—		3	0	27	5
AFC Wimbledon	2011–12	League Two	18	0	3	0	1	0	1	0	23	0
AFC Wimbledon	Total		79	6	7	0	1	0	7	0	94	6
Cambridge United (loan)	2011–12	Conference Premier	2	0	—		—		2 (Note: Appearances in FA Trophy)	0	4	0
Woking	2012–13	Conference Premier	36	2	1	0	—		4 (Note: 2 appearances in FA Trophy, 1 appearance in Surrey Senior Cup)	0	41	2
Woking	2013–14	Conference Premier	25	3	0	0	—		5 (Note: 4 appearances in Surrey Senior Cup, 1 appearance in FA Trophy)	0	30	3
Woking	Total		61	5	1	0	—		9	0	71	5
Margate	2014–15	Isthmian League Premier Division	35	1	0	0	—		7 (Note: 5 appearances in Isthmian League Cup, 2 appearances in Isthmian League Premier Division play-offs, 1 appearance in FA Trophy)	0	42	1
Margate	2015–16	National League South	19	0	2	1	—		1	0	22	1
Margate	2016–17	National League South	22	0	1	0	—		0	0	23	0
Margate	Total		76	1	3	1	—		8	0	87	2
Career total			299	14	13	1	5	0	30	0	347	15

== Honours ==
Brentford

- Football League Two: 2008–09

AFC Wimbledon

- Conference Premier play-offs: 2011

Woking

- Surrey Senior Cup: 2013–14

Margate

- Isthmian League Premier Division play-offs: 2015
