= Liam Dolman =

English footballer (born 1987)

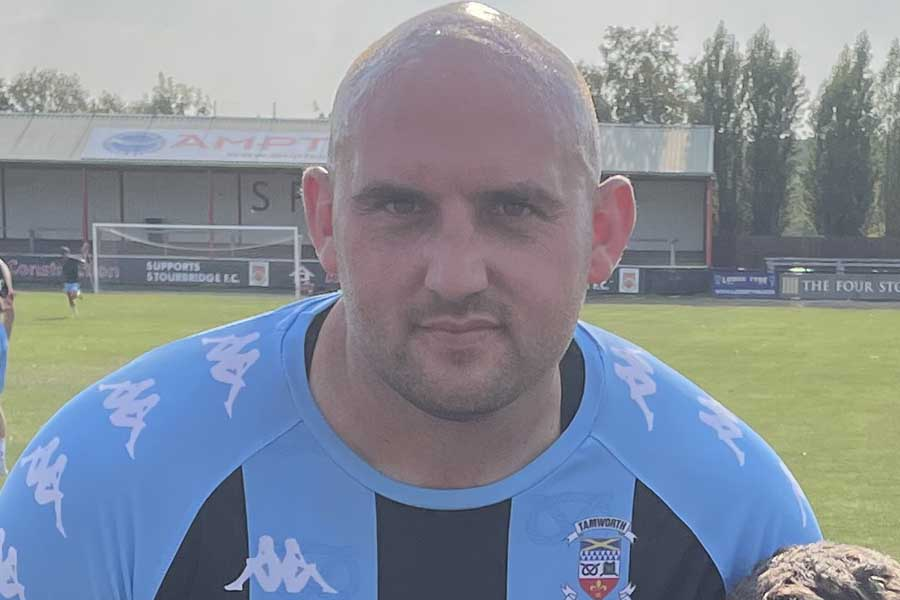
- Dolman in August 2022

Personal information
- Full name: Liam Edward Lewis Dolman
- Date of birth: 26 September 1987 (age 39)
- Place of birth: Northampton, England
- Height: 6 ft 2 in (1.88 m)
- Position: Defender

Team information
- Current team: Harborough Town

Youth career
- 1999–2005: Northampton Town

Senior career*
Years	Team	Apps	(Gls)
2005–2009	Northampton Town	45	(1)
2005	→ Aylesbury United (loan)	7	(0)
2006	→ Kettering Town (loan)	1	(0)
2009–2010	Kidderminster Harriers	8	(0)
2010	→ Corby Town (loan)	11	(0)
2010–2011	Corby Town	21	(1)
2011–2012	Banbury United	36	(3)
2012–2014	Daventry Town	64	(3)
2014–2022	AFC Rushden & Diamonds	246	(42)
2022–2024	Tamworth	56	(2)
2024–	Harborough Town	0	(0)
- * Club domestic league appearances and goals as of 12:14, 10 October 2024 (UTC)

Liam Edward Lewis Dolman (born 26 September 1987) is an English footballer who plays for National League North side Harborough Town, where he plays as a defender.

== Playing career ==
=== Northampton Town ===
Dolman began his career at his hometown club Northampton Town. He went out on loan to Southern League side Aylesbury United in 2005–06, where he made a real impact. This convinced John Gorman to recall him at the start of 2006–07 season, although he never really got a first-team chance.

When Stuart Gray was appointed as manager in January 2007, Dolman's luck changed. He was named quite regularly in the 16-man squad towards the end of 2006–07, and started one game against Doncaster Rovers.

On 2 November 2007, Dolman along with teammate Alex Dyer, were rewarded for the efforts with contract extensions until the summer of 2009.

Northampton Town confirmed on 7 July 2009, that Dolman would be released by the club, despite manager Stuart Gray asking the player to report back for pre-season training, he opted against retaining the player, and Dolman left the club.

=== Kidderminster Harriers ===
On 5 August 2009, Dolman was announced as signing for Conference Premier side Kidderminster Harriers for the 2009–10 season. Dolman penned a one-year contract, and was joined at the club on the same day by goalkeeper Jasbir Singh and defender Gavin Caines.

Liam made his debut for Kidderminster Harriers on 8 August 2009, in a Conference Premier fixture at home to Hayes & Yeading United, Dolman played up to the 66th minute, before being substituted for Duane Courtney. Kidderminster Harriers won the match 1–0 thanks to a 35th minute strike from Matthew Barnes-Homer.

Dolman went on to make eight appearances in the Conference Premier side Kidderminster Harriers, the last of those coming on 28 November 2009, as Kidderminster Harriers lost 1–0 at home to AFC Wimbledon, Dolman was replaced on the 81st minute by Aaron Farrell.

==== Corby Town (loan) ====
With Dolman seemingly out in the cold at Kidderminster Harriers, manager Steve Burr confirmed on the 1 February 2010 that Liam had moved on loan to Conference North side Corby Town for the remainder of the 2009–10 season. Dolman made 11 appearances as Corby Town, as they finished 6th and narrowly missed out on a play-off spot by 1 point and an inferior goal difference. Dolman was released by Kidderminster Harriers on the expiry of his one-year deal.

=== Corby Town ===
Liam returned to Corby Town on a free transfer for the 2010–11 season. He made 21 appearances and scoring a single goal which came in a match on 23 March 2011, as Corby Town beat Vauxhall Motors by a 3–1 score line, with Dolman netting the second goal on the 6th minute. Dolman helped Corby Town to a 13th place finish in the Conference North.

=== Banbury United ===
Liam joined Southern League Premier Division side Banbury United for the 2011–12 season. Dolman made his debut for Banbury United in a home fixture against Hitchin Town on 13 August 2011, the match finished 1–1. Dolman scored his first goal for Banbury United on 20 August 2011, in an away fixture against Bashley, Dolman headed in from a free-kick to open the scoring and set Banbury United to a 3–0 victory. Liam went on to make a total of 30 appearances and scored three goals, and spent some time captaining the side to a 16th place finish in the Southern League Premier Division.

Dolman started the 2012–13 season with Banbury United, making six appearances in the league before departing the club in November 2012.

=== Daventry Town ===
Dolman signed for Southern League Division One Central side Daventry Town, and made his debut in a home fixture with AFC Hayes on 3 November 2012, the match finished 2–0 to the visitors, with Dolman being named as man of the match. Liam made 30 appearances during the 2012–13 season, scoring one goal, in a 4–2 victory at home to Royston Town on 5 January 2013. Daventry Town finished the season in 8th position in the league.

Liam and his Daventry Town teammates made history during the 2013–14 season. The team made an incredible start to the campaign, winning their first seven matches in the Southern League Division One Central whilst also qualifying for the FA Cup first round proper for the first time in their history. They were drawn away to Chesterfield from League Two on 9 November 2013. Dolman in particular was having an inspiring game, with the game goalless, the player sustained a leg injury and substituted on the 55th minute for Joe Henderson, he was given a standing ovation by both sets of supporters. Chesterfield went on to win the match 2–0.

Liam was announced as the Daventry Town Supporters' Player of the season for 2013–14. He made 34 appearances and scored twice as they finished in 4th position in the Southern League Division One Central, qualifying for the play-offs, which they lost at the semi-final stage to Dolman's former club Kettering Town.

=== AFC Rushden & Diamonds ===
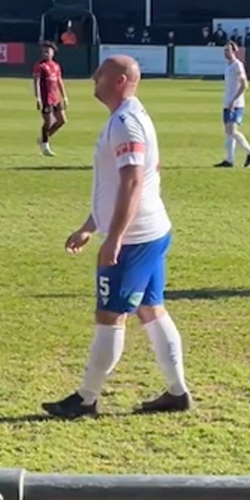
Dolman playing for AFC Rushden & Diamonds in March 2022

On 28 June 2014, it was announced that United Counties League Premier Division side AFC Rushden & Diamonds had signed Dolman.

Dolman played a key role in helping AFC Rushden & Diamonds to 2014–15 United Counties League Premier Division title, making 38 league appearances, and chipping in with a very impressive 13 goals in the league, including four against Desborough Town. Liam was awarded the Manager's Player of the Season, and also scooped the "Goal of the Season" award for 2014–15, with an effort against Long Buckby.

Following promotion to the Southern League Division One Central for the 2015–16 season, Dolman enjoyed another solid campaign, picking up a player of the month award on 23 November 2015, for his memorable contribution to AFC Rushden & Diamonds record run in the FA Cup, as they reached the 4th qualifying round, drawing 2–2 away at Barwell, with Dolman scoring the two goals, including a 95th minute equaliser to set up the replay, which Barwell won 1–0. Liam made 38 appearances, scoring six goals as AFC Rushden & Diamonds finished in 5th position in the Southern League Division One Central, eventually losing in the play-off final to St Ives Town.

AFC Rushden & Diamonds were transferred to the Northern Premier League First Division South for the 2016–17 season, it was personally a good season for Dolman scooping the Supporters' Player of the Season and Manager's Player of the Season awards. He made 41 appearances and scored six goals, but had the same disappointment as the previous campaign as AFC Rushden & Diamonds finished in 5th position in the Northern Premier League First Division South, losing to eventual play-off winners Witton Albion in the semi-final.

It was third time lucky for Dolman and AFC Rushden & Diamonds for the 2017–18 season, again the club were transferred, this time to the Southern League Division One East, Liam again picked up the Manager's Player of the Season award, making 41 appearances and scoring seven goals, as AFC Rushden & Diamonds finished 2nd by one point to Beaconsfield Town in the Southern League Division One East, but did gain promotion to the Southern League Premier Division Central.

With AFC Rushden & Diamonds now playing at their highest level since the clubs formation in 2011, they secured a credible 9th place finish in their first season in the Southern League Premier Division Central, with Liam making 30 appearances and scoring one goal.

On 3 July 2019, it was confirmed that Liam had signed a new contract to remain with AFC Rushden & Diamonds. However, the 2019–20 and 2020–21 seasons were both expunged due to the COVID-19 pandemic, the 2019–20 season was ended on 10 March with AFC Rushden & Diamonds in 11th position with Dolman making 25 appearances and scoring six goals, and the 2020–21 season ended even sooner on 3 November 2020, Dolman played in just three of the seven matches AFC Rushden & Diamonds managed to complete.

With Dolman going into his eighth campaign with AFC Rushden & Diamonds, On 15 February 2022, Andy Peaks who was the manager that signed Dolman back in 2014, departed the club to join Southern League Premier Division Central rivals Tamworth. Dolman managed to record 30 appearances and scored three goals including a 35 yard thunderbolt strike in a 1–0 away win against Tamworth. The 2021–22 season finished in disappointment for AFC Rushden & Diamonds, as they dropped out of the play-off positions on the final day of the season to finish 6th, although AFC Rushden & Diamonds did record their highest league finish.

Dolman departed AFC Rushden & Diamonds on 21 May 2022 after spending eight campaigns with the club, in a bid to find a new challenge within football.

=== Tamworth ===
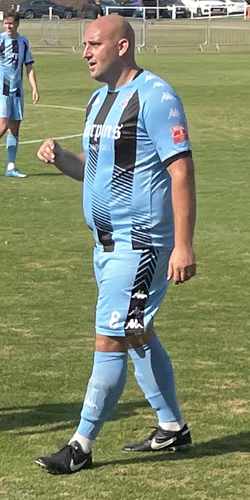
Dolman playing for Tamworth in August 2022

On 26 May 2022, Dolman was announced as signing for Southern League Premier Division Central rivals Tamworth, where he would be reunited with his former AFC Rushden & Diamonds manager Andy Peaks.

Dolman made his debut for Tamworth on 6 August 2022, in a Southern League Premier Division Central fixture at home to Ilkeston Town, with the match finishing 1–1.

Having helped the club to back-to-back promotions, he departed the club at the end of the 2023–24 season.

=== Harborough Town ===
On 2 October 2024, Dolman joined Southern League Premier Division Central club Harborough Town.

== Career statistics ==
As of end of 2023–24 season

Club	Season	League			FA Cup		League Cup		Other		Total	
Club	Season	Division	Apps	Goals	Apps	Goals	Apps	Goals	Apps	Goals	Apps	Goals
Northampton Town	2005–06	League Two	0	0	0	0	0	0	0	0	0	0
Aylesbury United (loan)	2005–06	Southern League Premier Division	7	0	2	0	—		0	0	9	0
Northampton Town	2006–07	League One	1	0	0	0	0	0	0	0	1	0
Northampton Town	2007–08	League One	30	0	0	0	0	0	0	0	30	0
Northampton Town	2008–09	League One	14	0	0	0	0	0	0	0	14	0
Northampton Town	Total		45	0	0	0	0	0	0	0	45	0
Kidderminster Harriers	2009–10	Conference Premier	8	0	0	0	—		0	0	8	0
Corby Town (loan)	2009–10	Conference North	11	0	0	0	—		0	0	11	0
Corby Town	2010–11	Conference North	21	1	0	0	—		0	0	21	1
Banbury United	2011–12	Southern League Premier Division	30	3	0	0	—		0	0	30	3
Banbury United	2012–13	Southern League Premier Division	6	0	0	0	—		0	0	6	0
Banbury United	Total		36	3	0	0	0	0	0	0	36	3
Daventry Town	2012–13	Southern League Division One Central	30	1	0	0	—		3 (Note: Three appearances in Northamptonshire Senior Cup)	0	33	1
Daventry Town	2013–14	Southern League Division One Central	34	2	5	1	—		5 (Note: Five appearances in FA Trophy)	1 (Note: One goal in FA Trophy)	44	4
Daventry Town	Total		64	3	5	1	0	0	8	1	77	5
AFC Rushden & Diamonds	2014–15	United Counties League Premier Division	38	13	4	0	—		4 (Note: Four appearances in United Counties League Cup)	0	46	13
AFC Rushden & Diamonds	2015–16	Southern League Division One Central	38	6	5	2	—		0	0	43	8
AFC Rushden & Diamonds	2016–17	Northern Premier League First Division South	41	6	4	1	—		3 (Note: Three appearances in Northern Premier League Challenge Cup)	2 (Note: Two goals in Northern Premier League Challenge Cup)	48	9
AFC Rushden & Diamonds	2017–18	Southern League Division One East	41	7	4	0	—		2 (Note: Two appearances in Southern League Cup)	1 (Note: One goal in Southern League Cup)	47	8
AFC Rushden & Diamonds	2018–19	Southern League Premier Division Central	30	1	2	0	—		1 (Note: One appearance in Southern League Cup)	0	33	1
AFC Rushden & Diamonds	2019–20	Southern League Premier Division Central	25	6	1	0	—		4 (Note: One appearance in Southern League Cup) (Note: Three appearances in FA Trophy)	0	30	6
AFC Rushden & Diamonds	2020–21	Southern League Premier Division Central	3	0	1	0	—		1 (Note: One appearance in FA Trophy)	0	5	0
AFC Rushden & Diamonds	2021–22	Southern League Premier Division Central	30	3	1	0	—		0	0	31	3
AFC Rushden & Diamonds	Total		246	42	22	3	0	0	15	3	283	48
Tamworth	2022–23	Southern League Premier Division Central	31	0	2	0	—		5 (Note: Four appearances in FA Trophy, one appearance in Birmingham Senior Cup)	0	38	0
Tamworth	2023–24	National League North	25	2	0	0	—		0	0	25	2
Tamworth	Total		56	2	2	0	0	0	5	0	63	2
Career total			494	51	31	43	0	0	28	4	553	59

== Honours ==
AFC Rushden & Diamonds

- United Counties League Premier Division: 2014–15

Tamworth

- National League North: 2023–24
