= Mark Bunn (English footballer) =

English footballer (born 1984)

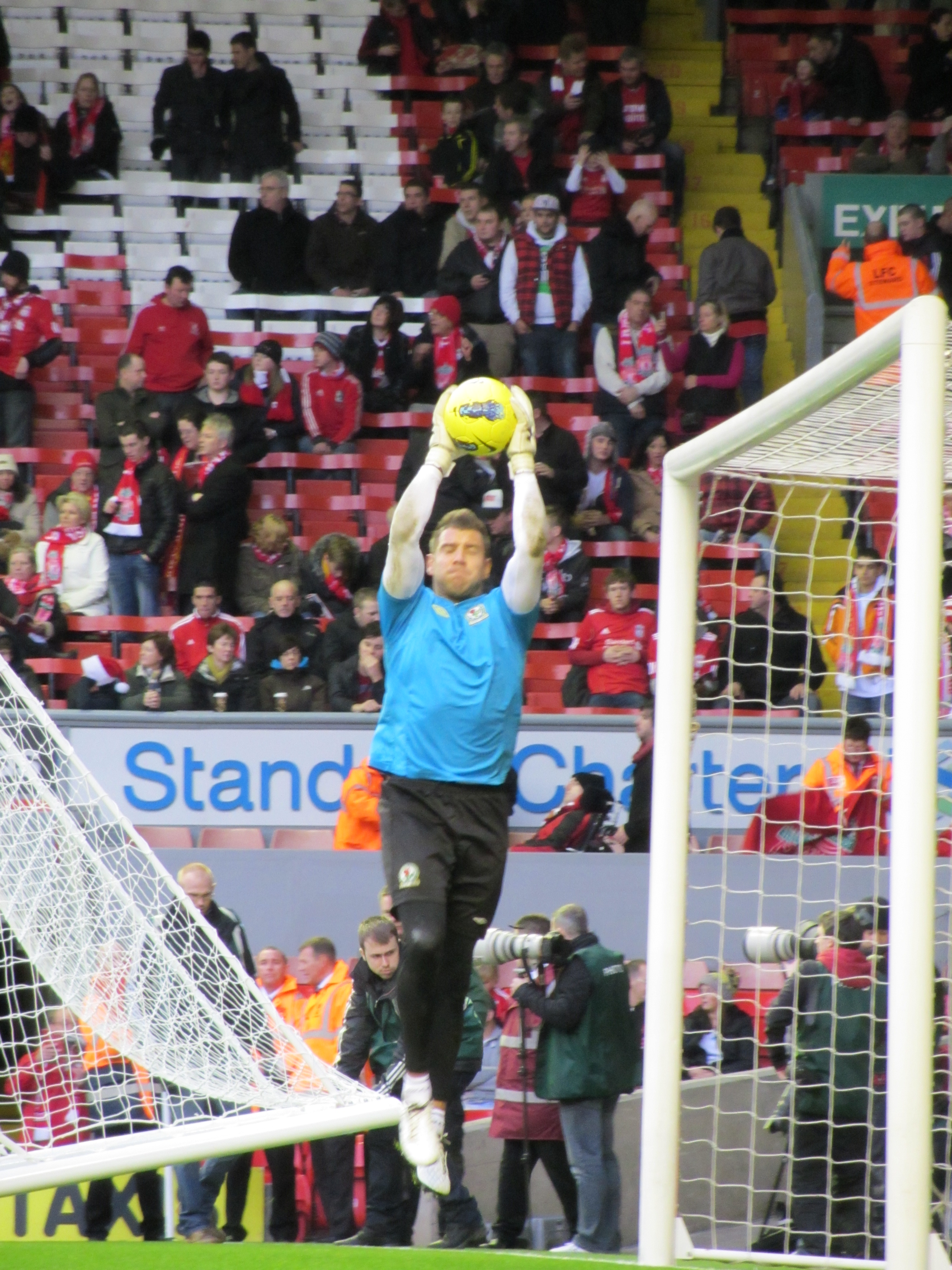
- Bunn warming up for Blackburn Rovers in 2011

Personal information
- Full name: Mark John Bunn
- Date of birth: 16 November 1984 (age 42)
- Place of birth: Camden, England
- Height: 6 ft 0 in (1.83 m)
- Position: Goalkeeper

Youth career
- 1998–2000: Tottenham Hotspur
- 2000–2001: Northampton Town

Senior career*
| Years | Team | Apps | (Gls) |
| 2001–2008 | Northampton Town | 90 | (0) |
| 2003 | → Aylesbury United (loan) | 2 | (0) |
| 2004 | → Kettering Town (loan) | 17 | (0) |
| 2008–2012 | Blackburn Rovers | 6 | (0) |
| 2009 | → Leicester City (loan) | 3 | (0) |
| 2009–2010 | → Sheffield United (loan) | 32 | (0) |
| 2012–2015 | Norwich City | 23 | (0) |
| 2015–2019 | Aston Villa | 18 | (0) |
| Total | | 191 | (0) |
- * Club domestic league appearances and goals

Mark John Bunn (born 16 November 1984) is an English professional football coach and a former player who played as a goalkeeper. Bunn was last goalkeeping coach at Cambridge United.

Born in London, Bunn began his career with the Tottenham Hotspur youth team, before signing for Northampton Town. He made his league debut for Northampton and went on to make 90 appearances for the club, before a succession of permanent and loan spells with various clubs before being signed by Norwich from Blackburn Rovers as cover for John Ruddy, in time for the 2012–13 season. When Ruddy sustained a leg injury, Bunn took his place in the first team for much of the season.

== Club career ==
=== Northampton Town ===
Born in Camden, Bunn started his career with Tottenham Hotspur as a trainee but joined Northampton Town before he was offered a professional contract. He had early loan spells at Aylesbury United and Kettering Town.

He made his first team debut for Northampton in a 3–0 victory over Queens Park Rangers in the first round of the League Cup in August 2005. He was given his league debut by then-manager John Gorman against Nottingham Forest in August 2006. Bunn made his 100th appearance for the Cobblers in a 2–0 victory over Oldham Athletic on 19 April 2008. His impressive performances ousted long term first choice keeper Lee Harper, who subsequently left Sixfields for Milton Keynes Dons.

On 27 April 2007, he won the Northampton Town player of the season award finishing ahead of Jason Crowe and Chris Doig.

Colin Calderwood, Bunn's former manager at Northampton and manager at the time of Nottingham Forest made an inquiry about signing the young goalkeeper in July 2007 with apparent interest also coming from Nottingham Forest's East Midlands rivals Derby County.

=== Blackburn Rovers ===
On 29 August 2008, it was announced that the then 23-year-old he would be joining Premier League club Blackburn Rovers subject to a medical. The signing was completed two days later on transfer deadline day, on a four-year deal for an undisclosed fee, believed to be over £1million. He made his Blackburn debut aged 24 in the FA Cup third round tie against Blyth Spartans.

Bunn signed for Leicester City on loan for a month on 16 February 2009, after first choice keeper David Martin suffered an injury. He made his debut a day later in a 2–2 draw against Hartlepool United, saving a penalty kick in a 1–0 win over Bristol Rovers on 21 February.

Bunn was recalled by Blackburn at the start of March, after first choice keeper Paul Robinson suffered an injury during Blackburn's 2–1 victory against Hull City. Despite his recall Bunn failed to make any further appearances for Rovers that season.

In August 2009, on the eve of the new season, Bunn joined Sheffield United on a month's loan that was subsequently extended to a six-month deal later the same month. He made his debut in United's first game of the season, keeping a clean sheet in a 0–0 draw against Middlesbrough. Bunn started the season as first choice keeper but a loss of form saw him dropped to the reserves. Following injuries to the other keepers at the club he was restored to the first team towards the end of the year and subsequently signed an extension to his loan deal, keeping him at Bramall Lane for the remainder of the season. Bunn's improved form then helped him cement his position as the first choice goalkeeper.

An injury to Robinson persuaded Blackburn Rovers to invoke an early recall to Ewood Park in March, with Bunn departing having played thirty five games for the Blades. At the start of the 2010–11 campaign, Bunn changed his shirt number from 38 to 13. On 24 August 2010, he started the second round League Cup tie at home to Norwich City in a 3–1 victory. On 22 September 2010, he started Blackburn's third round League Cup game against Aston Villa in a 3–1 defeat at Villa Park. He made his Premier League debut on 28 December 2010 in a 3–1 away win against West Bromwich Albion coming on as a half-time substitute for Paul Robinson who suffered an injury during the game at The Hawthorns. February 2011, saw him sign an extension to his existing contract to keep him at the club until the summer of 2013. On Wednesday 24 August 2011, Bunn started and played the full 90 minutes in a 3–1 win over Sheffield Wednesday at Ewood Park in the 2nd round of the League Cup. On 21 September 2011, he started and played the full 90 minutes in a 3–2 victory over Leyton Orient at Ewood Park in the League Cup third round. On Wednesday 26 October 2011, he started in the League Cup fourth round against Newcastle United at Ewood Park, playing the full 120 minutes after Gael Givet scored the winner in extra-time with a header, the game finished 4–3 to Blackburn. On 29 November 2011, he started and played the full 90 minutes in a 2–0 defeat against Cardiff City at the Cardiff City Stadium in Wales. He made his full debut on 26 December 2011 against Liverpool at Anfield in a 1–1 draw, making a reflex save in the last minute to earn Rovers a point. On 31 December 2011, just five days later, Bunn started and played the full 90 minutes in goal against Manchester United at Old Trafford in a stunning 3–2 away victory for Rovers. He made 8 appearances in all competitions during the 2011–12 season.

=== Norwich City ===
On 29 August 2012, Bunn joined Premier League side Norwich City for an undisclosed fee on a two-year deal, with an option of a further year. He was signed to compete with John Ruddy to be Norwich's leading goalkeeper. Bunn made his Canaries debut in a League Cup clash against Doncaster Rovers where he kept a clean sheet in a 1–0 victory at Carrow Road. He held onto the gloves for the subsequent League Cup match against Tottenham Hotspur in which he was awarded Man of the Match in part due to his last minute penalty save which helped Norwich to a 2–1 victory. He made his first Premier League appearance of the season on 24 November, replacing first choice goalkeeper John Ruddy due to injury in the 82nd minute in a 1–1 draw away to Everton. He made his first league start four days later, helping Norwich secure a 1–1 draw away to Southampton. In the away match against Queens Park Rangers on 2 February 2013, Bunn saved Adel Taarabt's penalty kick which he caused by kicking Jamie Mackie's foot inside the penalty area. On 17 March, Bunn was sent off in a match against Sunderland after handling a loose ball outside the penalty box. On 24 May 2015, Bunn announced via his Twitter account that he would be leaving Norwich at the end of the 2014–15 season.

=== Aston Villa ===
On 9 July 2015, Bunn joined Aston Villa as a free agent, signing a two-year contract. Bunn made his debut in the league cup match against Notts County in which Villa won 5–3 on 25 August 2015. On 16 January 2016, Bunn saved a penalty taken by Leicester's Riyad Mahrez in a 1–1 draw with Leicester.

He was released by Aston Villa at the end of the 2018–19 season.

== International career ==
He was eligible to play for the Republic of Ireland through his father and grandmother. Bunn had expressed a strong desire to play for Ireland, but was never called up to the Irish team.

== Career statistics ==
Appearances and goals by club, season and competition
| Club | Season | League | | | FA Cup | | League Cup | | Other | | Total | |
| Club | Season | Division | Apps | Goals | Apps | Goals | Apps | Goals | Apps | Goals | Apps | Goals |
|---|---|---|---|---|---|---|---|---|---|---|---|---|
| Northampton Town | 2005–06 | League Two | 0 | 0 | 0 | 0 | 2 | 0 | — | | 2 | 0 |
| Northampton Town | 2006–07 | League One | 42 | 0 | 3 | 0 | 1 | 0 | 1 (Note: Appearances in Football League Trophy) | 0 | 47 | 0 |
| Northampton Town | 2007–08 | League One | 45 | 0 | 4 | 0 | 2 | 0 | 1 | 0 | 52 | 0 |
| Northampton Town | 2008–09 | League One | 3 | 0 | — | | 2 | 0 | — | | 5 | 0 |
| Northampton Town | Total | | 90 | 0 | 7 | 0 | 7 | 0 | 2 | 0 | 106 | 0 |
| Blackburn Rovers | 2008–09 | Premier League | 0 | 0 | 1 | 0 | — | | — | | 1 | 0 |
| Blackburn Rovers | 2010–11 | Premier League | 3 | 0 | 1 | 0 | 2 | 0 | — | | 6 | 0 |
| Blackburn Rovers | 2011–12 | Premier League | 3 | 0 | 1 | 0 | 4 | 0 | — | | 8 | 0 |
| Blackburn Rovers | Total | | 6 | 0 | 3 | 0 | 6 | 0 | — | | 15 | 0 |
| Leicester City (loan) | 2008–09 | League One | 3 | 0 | — | | — | | — | | 3 | 0 |
| Sheffield United (loan) | 2009–10 | Championship | 32 | 0 | 3 | 0 | 0 | 0 | — | | 35 | 0 |
| Norwich City | 2012–13 | Premier League | 23 | 0 | 0 | 0 | 3 | 0 | — | | 26 | 0 |
| Norwich City | 2013–14 | Premier League | 0 | 0 | 2 | 0 | 3 | 0 | — | | 5 | 0 |
| Norwich City | 2014–15 | Championship | 0 | 0 | 0 | 0 | 0 | 0 | — | | 0 | 0 |
| Norwich City | Total | | 23 | 0 | 2 | 0 | 6 | 0 | — | | 31 | 0 |
| Aston Villa | 2015–16 | Premier League | 10 | 0 | 1 | 0 | 1 | 0 | — | | 12 | 0 |
| Aston Villa | 2016–17 | Championship | 6 | 0 | 0 | 0 | 1 | 0 | — | | 7 | 0 |
| Aston Villa | 2017–18 | Championship | 1 | 0 | 0 | 0 | 0 | 0 | — | | 1 | 0 |
| Aston Villa | 2018–19 | Championship | 1 | 0 | 0 | 0 | 0 | 0 | — | | 1 | 0 |
| Aston Villa | Total | | 18 | 0 | 1 | 0 | 2 | 0 | — | | 21 | 0 |
| Career total | | | 172 | 0 | 16 | 0 | 21 | 0 | 2 | 0 | 211 | 0 |
