= Jerome Watt =

English footballer

Personal information
- Date of birth: 20 October 1984 (age 42)
- Place of birth: England
- Position: Winger

Senior career*
| Years | Team | Apps | (Gls) |
| 2004–2006 | Blackburn Rovers | 0 | (0) |
| 2004 | → Cercle Brugge (loan) | 2 | (0) |
| 2006–2007 | Northampton Town | 10 | (0) |
| 2007 | → Morecambe (loan) | 3 | (0) |
| 2007 | → Salisbury City (loan) | ? | (0) |
| 2007 | Rochdale | 0 | (0) |
| 2007 | Southport | ? | (?) |
| 2007–2008 | Fleetwood Town | ? | (?) |
| 2008 | Leigh Genesis | 10 | (1) |
| 2008–2010 | AFC Fylde | ? | (?) |
| 2010–2011 | Lancaster City | 20 | (4) |
- * Club domestic league appearances and goals as of 15:25, 8 April 2009 (UTC)

Jerome Watt (born 20 October 1984) is an English retired professional footballer who most recently played for Lancaster City.

== Career ==
Watt, a midfielder, began his career as a trainee with Blackburn Rovers, and in 2004 was sent on loan to Belgian Belgian League club, Cercle Brugge before joining Northampton Town on a free transfer on 10 August 2006. He then had loan spells at Morecambe, from 26 January to 18 March 2007 and Salisbury City from 22 March to 22 April before joining Rochdale on 1 August. However, he only stayed for a short time before being released the following month without playing a first team game.

On 14 September 2007 he joined Conference North club, Southport, and he was an unused substitute the following day in Southport's victory over Solihull Moors. He made his debut the following Tuesday, coming on as a substitute against Hyde United with the score 1–0 to Hyde. He had an instant impact, helping Southport equalise and then go on to win the game in the dying minutes. He was released by Southport on 15 November, and then signed for Northern Premier League Premier Division club, Fleetwood Town. After the club were promoted to the Conference North, Watt left and after a trial at the club, joined Leigh Genesis for the 2008–09 season, making his debut on the opening day of the season as a substitute in a 2–0 defeat to Eastwood Town. He scored his first goal for the club on 6 September 2008, after coming on as a substitute in a 2–0 victory over Frickley Athletic. In December 2008 he signed for AFC Fylde. Watt moved to Lancaster City in 2010, scoring four times in twenty appearances for the club before announcing his retirement in January 2011, as a result of work commitments.
