= Scott McGleish =

Scottish footballer (born 1974)

Personal information
- Full name: Scott McGleish
- Date of birth: 10 February 1974 (age 52)
- Place of birth: Barnet, England
- Height: 5 ft 9 in (1.75 m)
- Position: Forward

Team information
- Current team: Leverstock Green

Senior career*
Years	Team	Apps	(Gls)
1993–1994	Edgware Town	36	(32)
1994–1995	Charlton Athletic	6	(0)
1994	→ Leyton Orient (loan)	6	(1)
1995–1996	Peterborough United	13	(0)
1996	→ Colchester United (loan)	15	(6)
1996	→ Cambridge United (loan)	10	(7)
1996–1997	Leyton Orient	34	(7)
1997–2001	Barnet	134	(37)
2001–2004	Colchester United	144	(38)
2004–2007	Northampton Town	111	(42)
2007–2009	Wycombe Wanderers	75	(34)
2008–2009	→ Northampton Town (loan)	9	(1)
2009	→ Leyton Orient (loan)	16	(5)
2009–2011	Leyton Orient	81	(24)
2011–2012	Bristol Rovers	27	(7)
2012	→ Barnet (loan)	9	(0)
2012	Whitehawk	6	(3)
2012	Chesham United	7	(1)
2013	Enfield Town	13	(12)
2013–2017	Wealdstone	112	(44)
2017	Cheshunt	1	(0)
2017–2018	Chesham United	15	(2)
2018–2019	Edgware Town	6	(0)
2019	Hendon	3	(0)
2019–2021	Edgware Town	16	(9)
2021–	Leverstock Green	41	(0)

Managerial career
- 2021–: Leverstock Green (assistant manager)
- * Club domestic league appearances and goals as of 19:24, 28 March 2026 (UTC)

Scott McGleish (born 10 February 1974) is an English footballer who plays for Leverstock Green, in addition to serving as an assistant manager. In a career spanning 32 years across four decades, McGleish has made over 900 league appearances. He is one of the few players to have ever passed 1,100 appearances in competitive matches.

== Career ==
=== Charlton Athletic ===
McGleish was born in Barnet, Greater London. He began his career at non-league Edgware Town in 1993, before being scouted by league club Charlton Athletic. At the age of 20, McGleish was loaned to Leyton Orient for the first of four spells at the club. During this loan, he made six appearances and scored his first senior goal in league football. He returned to Charlton but made only a limited number of starts. He then moved to Peterborough United, where he made only a few substitute appearances. He was sent out on loans to Colchester United and Cambridge United.

=== 1997–2007 ===
He was subsequently sold to his previous club, Leyton Orient, now holding a constant place in the team, and in his one-year spell back at Brisbane Road he scored seven goals. After this single season he was sold to Barnet, where he stayed for four years and had a goals-to-game ratio of a goal every 3.6 games. He then returned to Colchester United, where he averaged a similar goal-scoring tally. He moved to Northampton Town in 2004 under a Bosman transfer and was their player of the year in his first season. In 2006, he retained the player of the season accolade, Northampton's first player for 31 years to do so. The same season, he scored 24 goals as Northampton won promotion. He signed a new two-year contract in June 2006.

=== Wycombe Wanderers ===
He joined Wycombe Wanderers on 25 January 2007 for an undisclosed fee from Northampton Town, signing a two-year contract.

McGleish was loaned out to his former club Northampton Town on 28 October 2008 for a month's loan lasting until 25 November, wearing shirt number 27. He scored his first goal in his second spell in a first-round FA Cup tie at Elland Road against Leeds United on 7 November. His loan move was extended to January 2009, and he went on to score his first and only league goal of his loan period against Scunthorpe United. McGleish's second spell at Northampton was less successful, as he scored only twice in 11 appearances. Manager Stuart Gray decided not to sign the striker in the January transfer window, and he returned to Wycombe.

=== East London again ===
He rejoined former club Leyton Orient on loan for the third time until the end of the 2008–09 season. He scored the first two goals of his loan spell in the 3–2 defeat at home to Peterborough United before returning to Wycombe and subsequently being released on 6 May 2009. He then signed a one-year contract with Leyton Orient on May 26, 2009. He scored 12 goals in 41 league appearances prior to the last game of the 2009–10 season away to Colchester United. His goals included a double against Carlisle United in a 2–2 draw and the winner away from home against old club Wycombe in October. He scored a diving header to give Orient a 1–0 win against Charlton Athletic and another double in a 2–1 win over Tranmere Rovers. On 1 May, he scored a 94th-minute goal to seal Orient's League One status with a 2–0 win over Wycombe with a game to spare. The goal also relegated his old club, as they needed a win to maintain their own League One status.

On 7 December 2010, McGleish scored an extra-time hat-trick in the FA Cup second round against Droylsden. His teammate Jonathan Téhoué also scored a hat-trick, ultimately guiding Orient to an 8–2 victory and a place in the Third Round.

On 10 May 2011, McGleish was released by Leyton Orient after his fourth stint with the club, despite being the club's top scorer of the 2010–11 season with 17 league goals. McGleish revealed that he had not been offered a new contract and added that he was "gutted and a little bit shocked", although he had suspected that he would be released.

=== Bristol Rovers ===
On 29 June 2011, he signed a contract with recently relegated Bristol Rovers. McGleish stated that his desire to work with manager Paul Buckle was the main reason for him signing.

On 6 August 2011, the opening day of the 2011–12 season, McGleish scored Rovers' first goal and set up another on his debut for the club in their 3–2 win at AFC Wimbledon.

McGleish re-joined Barnet on a short-term loan deal on 1 March 2012.

On 17 May 2012, McGleish was released by the Rovers. In November 2012, McGleish joined Chesham United on a free transfer from Whitehawk.

=== Enfield Town ===
McGleish was released from Whitehawk on 1 January 2013 and promptly joined Isthmian League Premier Division side Enfield Town. He made his debut for the club in a 3–2 defeat against Bury Town, in which he scored. He scored nine more goals in his next eight games, including braces against Carshalton Athletic and Metropolitan Police and a hat-trick against Cray Wanderers.

=== Wealdstone ===
In March 2013, McGleish accepted an offer to join rivals Wealdstone to help bolster their push for promotion to the Conference South. He marked his debut with a goal in a 4–2 win over Margate. He played in the Isthmian League Premier Division play-off semi-final against Concord Rangers, hitting the crossbar late on while Wealdstone were 1–0 up. They went on to lose the game 2–1 in extra time. McGleish signed on for the 2013–14 season at Wealdstone and was part of the team that won the Isthmian League Premier Division title and thus achieved promotion to the Conference South. He finished the season as the club's top scorer with 23 goals.

=== Cheshunt ===
In 2017, McGleish joined Cheshunt. He made his debut in a 3–1 home defeat to Dorking Wanderers in the FA Cup at the age of 43, making him the oldest player in Cheshunt's history.

=== Return to Chesham United ===
Having made only one appearance for Cheshunt, McGleish rejoined Chesham United in September 2017; he made his second début in a 2–0 win over Dunstable Town on 12 September, scoring the second goal. In October 2018, McGleish departed the club alongside fellow coaches Mark Swales and Dave Sandiford. He returned to Hendon as a player-coach in December 2018, a club he played for as a youth in the early 90s.

=== Leverstock Green ===
In June 2021, McGleish joined Leverstock Green as player/assistant manager, joining new manager Fergus Moore. He made 20 league appearances in his first season with the club and 20 in all competitions in the following season, but saw his playing time drastically reduced in the 2023–24 season, in which he made only three league appearances and five in all competitions. In the second of these, a 0–0 draw with Cockfosters on 23 March 2024, he achieved the distinction of having played beyond the age of 50; however, the 2024–25 season brought only a further three appearances in the league, the last of these coming in October 2024 in a 3–3 draw with Biggleswade.

In August 2025, after ten months away, he made his return to the first team in a 3–2 victory at Stotfold, coming on as an 89th-minute substitute.

== Managerial career ==
In June 2021, McGleish joined Leverstock Green as player/assistant manager, joining new manager Fergus Moore.

== Career statistics ==
As of match played 28 March 2026

Appearances and goals by club, season and competition
Club	Season	League			FA Cup		League Cup		Other		Total	
Club	Season	Division	Apps	Goals	Apps	Goals	Apps	Goals	Apps	Goals	Apps	Goals
Edgware Town	1993–94	Isthmian League Division Two	36	32	0	0	0	0	0	0	36	32
Charlton Athletic	1994–95	First Division	6	0	0	0	0	0	0	0	6	0
Leyton Orient (loan)	1994–95	Second Division	6	1	0	0	0	0	1	1	7	2
Peterborough United	1995–96	Second Division	12	0	1	0	1	0	4	2	18	2
Peterborough United	1996–97	Second Division	1	0	0	0	0	0	0	0	1	0
Peterborough United	Total		13	0	1	0	1	0	4	2	19	2
Colchester United (loan)	1995–96	Third Division	15	6	0	0	0	0	2	0	17	6
Cambridge United (loan)	1996–97	Third Division	10	7	0	0	1	0	0	0	11	7
Leyton Orient	1996–97	Third Division	26	7	1	0	0	0	1	0	28	7
Leyton Orient	1997–98	Third Division	8	0	0	0	3	1	0	0	11	1
Leyton Orient	Total		34	7	1	0	3	1	1	0	39	8
Barnet	1997–98	Third Division	40	13	1	0	0	0	0	0	41	13
Barnet	1998–99	Third Division	36	8	1	0	2	1	1	1	40	10
Barnet	1999–2000	Third Division	44	10	1	0	2	2	2	0	49	12
Barnet	2000–01	Third Division	19	5	0	0	1	1	1	1	21	7
Barnet	Total		139	36	3	0	5	4	4	2	151	42
Colchester United	2000–01	Second Division	21	5	0	0	0	0	0	0	21	5
Colchester United	2001–02	Second Division	46	15	2	1	2	0	2	0	52	16
Colchester United	2002–03	Second Division	43	8	1	0	1	0	1	1	46	9
Colchester United	2003–04	Second Division	34	10	7	1	1	0	6	6	48	17
Colchester United	Total		144	38	10	2	4	0	9	7	167	47
Northampton Town	2004–05	League Two	45	13	3	2	2	1	3	1	53	17
Northampton Town	2005–06	League Two	42	17	4	4	2	1	2	2	50	24
Northampton Town	2006–07	League One	25	12	3	1	0	0	0	0	28	13
Northampton Town	Total		112	42	10	7	4	2	5	3	131	54
Wycombe Wanderers	2006–07	League Two	14	5	0	0	0	0	0	0	14	5
Wycombe Wanderers	2007–08	League Two	46	26	1	0	1	0	2	0	50	26
Wycombe Wanderers	2008–09	League Two	15	3	0	0	1	0	1	0	17	3
Wycombe Wanderers	Total		75	34	1	0	2	0	3	0	81	34
Northampton Town (loan)	2008–09	League One	9	1	2	1	0	0	0	0	11	2
Leyton Orient (loan)	2008–09	League One	16	5	0	0	0	0	0	0	16	5
Leyton Orient	2009–10	League One	42	12	2	0	1	0	0	0	45	12
Leyton Orient	2010–11	League One	39	12	8	6	2	0	0	0	49	18
Leyton Orient	Total		97	29	10	6	3	0	0	0	110	35
Bristol Rovers	2011–12	League Two	27	7	2	2	2	0	1	0	32	9
Barnet (loan)	2011–12	League Two	9	0	0	0	0	0	0	0	9	0
Whitehawk	2012–13	Isthmian League Premier Division	6	3	2	1	0	0	0	0	8	4
Chesham United	2012–13	Southern League Premier Division	7	1	1	2	0	0	0	0	8	3
Enfield Town	2012–13	Isthmian League Premier Division	13	12	0	0	0	0	0	0	13	12
Wealdstone	2012–13	Isthmian League Premier Division	11	3	0	0	0	0	1	0	12	3
Wealdstone	2013–14	Isthmian League Premier Division	37	23	3	3	0	0	6	2	46	28
Wealdstone	2014–15	Conference South	37	8	0	0	0	0	7	2	44	10
Wealdstone	2015–16	National League South	9	1	3	0	0	0	4	1	16	2
Wealdstone	2016–17	National League South	7	0	0	0	0	0	8	3	15	3
Wealdstone	Total		101	35	6	3	0	0	26	8	133	46
Cheshunt	2017–18	Isthmian League Division One North	0	0	1	0	0	0	0	0	1	0
Chesham United	2017–18	Southern League Premier Division	12	2	0	0	0	0	5	0	17	2
Chesham United	2018–19	Southern League Premier Division	3	0	1	0	0	0	0	0	4	0
Chesham United	Total		15	2	1	0	0	0	5	0	21	2
Edgware Town	2018–19	SSML Premier Division	6	0	0	0	0	0	0	0	6	0
Hendon	2018–19	Southern League Premier Division	2	0	0	0	0	0	0	0	2	0
Hendon	2019–20	Southern League Premier South	1	0	0	0	0	0	1	0	2	0
Hendon	Total		3	0	0	0	0	0	1	0	4	0
Edgware Town	2019–20	SSML Premier Division	11	4	0	0	0	0	2	1	13	5
Edgware Town	2020–21	SSML Premier Division	5	5	2	1	0	0	2	0	9	6
Edgware Town	Total		16	9	2	1	0	0	4	1	22	11
Leverstock Green	2021–22	SSML Premier Division	20	0	1	0	0	0	6	0	27	0
Leverstock Green	2022–23	SSML Premier Division	11	0	3	0	0	0	6	0	20	0
Leverstock Green	2023–24	SSML Premier Division	3	0	0	0	0	0	2	0	5	0
Leverstock Green	2024–25	Southern League Division One Central	3	0	0	0	0	0	0	0	3	0
Leverstock Green	2025–26	Southern League Division One Central	4	0	0	0	0	0	0	0	4	0
Leverstock Green	2026–27	Southern League Division One Central	0	0	0	0	0	0	0	0	0	0
Total			41	0	4	0	0	0	14	0	59	0
Career total			940	301	57	25	25	7	80	24	1,102	358

== Other interests ==
Until 2013, McGleish served on the management committee of the Professional Footballers' Association.

In 2011, while at Leyton Orient, McGleish appeared in a television advert for the Nintendo DS in the UK.

In 2023, McGleish spoke about his career on the 'Undr [sic] the Cosh' podcast, hosted by former footballers Jon Parkin and Chris Brown and comedy writer Chris J. Brown.

== Honours ==
Northampton Town

- Football League Two runner-up: 2005–06

Wealdstone

- Isthmian League: 2013–14

== See also ==
- List of men's footballers with the most official appearances
