= Danny May =

English footballer (born 1988)

Personal information
- Full name: Daniel William May
- Date of birth: 19 November 1988 (age 37)
- Place of birth: Watford, England
- Position: Defender

Team information
- Current team: Christchurch

Youth career
- Northampton Town

Senior career*
Years	Team	Apps	(Gls)
2007–2008	Northampton Town	25	(0)
2008	Wivenhoe Town	1	(1)
2009	Enfield Town	15	(1)
2009–2015	Hemel Hempstead Town	250	(?)
2015–?	Kings Langley	?	(?)
2015–?	Royston Town	?	(?)
2022–2023	Amersham Town	2	(0)
2024	Christchurch FC	4	(0)
- * Club domestic league appearances and goals ‡ National team caps and goals as of 10:11, 1 September 2008 (UTC)

Daniel William May (born 19 November 1988) is an English footballer who plays for Christchurch. He plays mostly as a right back.

== Career ==
May came through Northampton Town's youth system and agreed a professional contract in April 2007. He made his first team début on 21 April 2007 in a 1–0 win over Chesterfield. He made two more appearances at the end of the 2006–07 season. He made three subsequent appearances in the 2007–08 season, the last against Leeds United on 5 January 2008. He was released at the end of the 2007–08 season.

He dropped six divisions, joining Wivenhoe Town, in August 2008. He signed for Enfield Town in February 2009. He joined Hemel Hempstead Town for the start of the 2009–10 season.

In August 2015, May was with Southern League Division One Central side Kings Langley. He has since moved on to Royston Town.

In the summer of 2022, May signed with Amersham Town.

In the summer of 2024, May signed for Christchurch.
