= Tom Bonner =

Scottish footballer (born 1988)

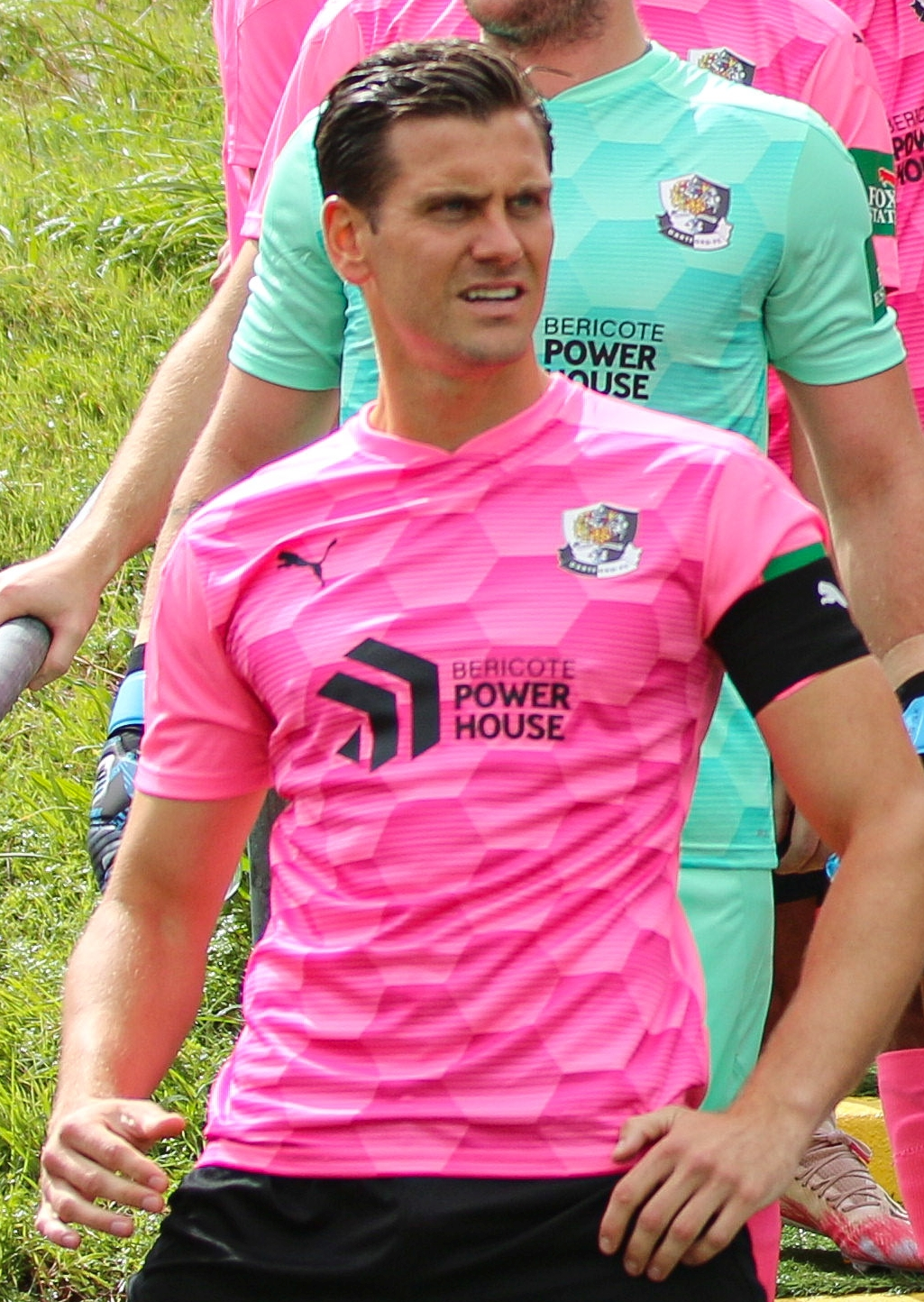
- Bonner lining up for Dartford in August 2021.

Personal information
- Full name: Thomas Ernest Bonner
- Date of birth: 6 February 1988 (age 38)
- Place of birth: Camden, England
- Height: 1.92 m (6 ft 3 1/2 in)
- Position: Defender

Youth career
- Queens Park Rangers

Senior career*
Years	Team	Apps	(Gls)
2005–2007	Northampton Town	0	(0)
2005	→ Bedford Town (loan)	9	(1)
2006	→ Nuneaton Borough (loan)	11	(0)
2007	Rushden & Diamonds	0	(0)
2007	→ Bedford Town (loan)	6	(0)
2007	→ Heybridge Swifts (loan)	7	(0)
2007–2009	Hinckley United	49	(1)
2009–2010	Ilkeston Town	30	(1)
2010–2013	Dartford	125	(3)
2013–2015	Cambridge United	13	(0)
2014–2015	→ Dover Athletic (loan)	22	(1)
2015–2016	Ebbsfleet United	37	(2)
2016–2023	Dartford	242	(8)
2023	Havant & Waterlooville	5	(0)
2023–2026	Cray Wanderers	78	(6)
Total		634	(23)

International career
2007	Scotland U19		
- * Club domestic league appearances and goals as of 17:10, 25 April 2026 (UTC)

Thomas Ernest Bonner (born 6 February 1988) is a retired, former Scottish footballer.

== Career ==
Bonner began his career in the Queens Park Rangers Academy before he signed a professional contract with Northampton Town in 2005. He went on loan to Bedford Town and Nuneaton Borough before he signed with Rushden & Diamonds in January 2007. At Rushden he went out on loan to Bedford Town and Heybridge Swifts. During his spell with Bedford Town he notably scored the winning goal in a play off final against Chippenham Town to secure Bedford's promotion to the Conference South. He was released by Rushden in May 2007 and went on to play non-league football with Hinckley United and Ilkeston Town. In 2010 Bonner joined Conference Premier side Dartford and after spending three seasons at Princes Park he signed with Cambridge United in May 2013. He made his Football League debut on 9 August 2014 in a 1–0 win at home against Plymouth Argyle.

In September 2014, Bonner joined Conference Premier side Dover Athletic on loan, helping the club to record nine clean sheets in his first twenty-four appearances, including in two FA Cup shock wins over Football League sides Morecambe and Cheltenham Town as the club reached the FA Cup third round against Premier League side Crystal Palace, where they lost to a strong Palace squad.

Bonner signed for Ebbsfleet United on an 18-month contract on 15 January 2015.

On 1 June 2016, Bonner rejoined former side Dartford for the 2016–17 National League South season.

On 2 June 2018, Bonner was sent off representing Hackney pub The Gun in the BT Sport Pub Cup final at Leicester City's King Power Stadium.

On 22 June 2023, Bonner announced his retirement from football.

Bonner came out of retirement just four months later by joining Havant & Waterlooville.

However, after only five first-team appearances, Bonner left Havant & Waterlooville in November 2023 and joined Cray Wanderers, making his debut for the club on 25 November 2023 during a 1–1 draw against Dulwich Hamlet.

On 24 April 2026, Bonner announced his retirement following the conclusion of the 2025–26 season.

== Honours ==
Cambridge United

- FA Trophy: 2013–14

Dartford

- Conference South Play-Offs: 2011–12
- Kent Senior Cup: 2019–20, 2021–22

Individual

- National League South Team of the Year: 2016–17, 2017–18, 2021–22
