= Scott Cross (footballer) =

English footballer

Scott Cross (born 30 October 1987) is an English footballer. He is a striker who plays for Daventry Town He appeared in five league games for Northampton Town F.C. but was released on 20 March 2007. During his time at the Cobblers, he had loan spells with Bedford Town and Kettering Town.

Scott signed for Kettering Town in October 2013 however returned to Daventry Town after only a single appearance. Scott's biggest football achievement came when he signed for ON Chenecks Vets in 2022 to support their defence of the Vets County Cup.
