= Joe Burnell =

English footballer

Personal information
- Full name: Joseph Michael Burnell
- Date of birth: 10 October 1980 (age 46)
- Place of birth: Bristol, England
- Height: 5 ft 10 in (1.78 m)
- Position: Midfielder

Youth career
- ?–1999: Bristol City

Senior career*
Years	Team	Apps	(Gls)
1999–2004	Bristol City	131	(4)
2004–2006	Wycombe Wanderers	57	(0)
2006–2008	Northampton Town	57	(1)
2008–2009	Oxford United	21	(1)
2009–2010	Exeter City	8	(0)
2010–2014	Bath City	110	(3)
2014	Shepton Mallet	5	(0)
2014	Bath City	0	(0)
Total		389	(9)
- * Club domestic league appearances and goals

Joseph Michael Burnell (born 10 October 1980) is an English former professional footballer. Having represented several clubs in the Football League and Football Conference, most notably Bristol City and Bath City, he moved away from football after his retirement in 2014 to work in property management.

== Career ==
Burnell started his career with Bristol City and he became part of the first team squad at Ashton Gate halfway through the 1999–2000 season. Shortly after his debut he scored his first goal for the club in a Football League Trophy tie against future club Exeter City. His displays were enough to earn him a long-term contract and a short spell as the club's captain. He was part of the side that won the 2003 Football League Trophy Final, and scored in the Southern Area final against Cambridge United. He scored his first and only league goal for City in a 1–1 draw with Luton Town in November 2003.

Burnell joined Wycombe Wanderers in July 2004 after Tony Adams' summer clearout which saw the departure of Michael Simpson, Dannie Bulman, Steve Brown and Darren Currie. Burnell was hoping to gain a regular first team place and after a season blighted by injury and illness he formed a midfield trio with Matt Bloomfield and Keith Ryan. Burnell scored his first and only goal for the club in an FA Cup tie against future club Northampton Town.

Burnell was also a regular under John Gorman and consequently followed his manager when he left Wycombe to join Northampton Town in July 2006. During his time at Northampton was constantly a good performer being named captain on occasions in the absence of Chris Doig and Mark Hughes. He scored two goals for Northampton; one in an FA Cup tie against Grimsby Town and the other in the league against Huddersfield Town.

On 21 April 2008, it was announced that he would be released at the end of the 2007–08 season, which was a surprise to most fans.

Burnell signed for Oxford on 1 July 2008. Shortly afterwards he was named captain to replace Adam Murray in the role. However, in April 2009 it was announced that he no longer had a future at the club. After a successful trial at Exeter he joined them on 9 July 2009 on a free transfer.

It was announced on 14 May 2010 that he had been released by Exeter, along with 8 other players On 13 July 2010, Burnell joined Conference National side Bath City.

== Honours ==
Bristol City

- Football League Trophy: 2002–03; runner-up: 1999–2000
