= Dave Kevan =

Scottish footballer & coach

Personal information
- Full name: David John Kevan
- Date of birth: 31 August 1968 (age 58)
- Place of birth: Wigtown, Scotland
- Height: 5 ft 8 in (1.73 m)
- Position: Midfielder

Youth career
- Notts County

Senior career*
Years	Team	Apps	(Gls)
1986–1990	Notts County	89	(3)
1989	→ Cardiff City (loan)	7	(0)
1990–1994	Stoke City	81	(2)
1990	→ Maidstone United (loan)	3	(0)
1994	Bournemouth	1	(0)
Total		181	(5)

Managerial career
- 2002: Stoke City (caretaker)
- 2009: Notts County (caretaker)
- 2009–2010: Notts County (caretaker)
- * Club domestic league appearances and goals

David John Kevan (born 31 August 1968) is a Scottish football coach and former player.

A midfielder, he made his debut in the English Football League for Notts County in February 1986. He spent the next four years at the club, also enjoying a brief loan spell at Cardiff City. He signed with Stoke City in February 1990 and broke into the first-team in the 1991–92 season following a short loan spell at Maidstone United the previous season. He helped Stoke to win the Football League Trophy in 1992 and then the Second Division title in 1992–93, before he ended his career at Bournemouth in 1994. His career over by the age of 26, he made a total of 221 appearances in league and cup competitions, scoring six goals.

He remained in the game as a coach, serving Stoke City, Burnley, Notts County, Stockport County, Hereford United, Cheltenham Town, Forest Green Rovers, Port Vale and Hanley Town. He also had three spells as a caretaker manager, once at Stoke City in October 2002 and twice at Notts County in the 2009–10 season.

== Playing career ==
=== Notts County ===
Kevan began his career with English Third Division club Notts County. He made his debut for the "Magpies" against Gillingham in February 1986, one of three appearances he made during the 1985–86 season under the stewardship of Jimmy Sirrel. He forced his way into the first team at Meadow Lane in the 1986–87 season, making 38 appearances and scoring one goal. He played in 40 games in the 1987–88 campaign as Notts missed out on promotion by a single point under John Barnwell's tenure as manager. He played 24 times in 1988–89, but lost his place under new manager Neil Warnock in the 1989–90 campaign and spent a month on loan at league rivals Cardiff City, making seven appearances at Ninian Park.

=== Stoke City ===
In February 1990, Kevan joined Stoke City under the management of Alan Ball. His debut for Stoke was in the Potteries derby against Port Vale in a 0–0 draw at Vale Park on 3 February. Stoke were relegated out of the Second Division at the end of the 1989–90 season. He found himself out of the team in 1990–91, making eight appearances and spending time out on loan at Maidstone United in the Fourth Division. He failed to make much impact at Watling Street either, featuring just three times for the "Stones". New Stoke manager Lou Macari moved Kevan into defence in 1991–92, and he played in 57 matches, including in the 1992 Associate Members' Cup final as City beat Stockport County 1–0 at Wembley. However, this would be his final season as a key fixture in the first XI as the following campaign would prove to be very competitive for central midfield places with Paul Ware, Carl Beeston and Steve Foley all in contention.

He made only 16 appearances during the 1992–93 season as Stoke won promotion as champions of the Second Division and scored one goal – the only goal of a 1–0 home win over Bradford City on 20 February. Reminiscing on the goal many years later he said that "It was late on in front of the Boothen End. I remember Mark Stein hit the bar and for whatever reason I was in the 18-yard box and put in the rebound. I don't think anyone in the ground was more surprised than me". He played only one First Division game in the 1993–94 season and went on to end his player career with a single Second Division appearance as a Bournemouth player under the stewardship of rookie manager Tony Pulis. After leaving Dean Court he returned to the Victoria Ground to become a coach.

== Coaching career ==
After retiring as a professional player, Kevan joined the coaching staff of Stoke City and was appointed as first-team coach in 2001. He became the club's caretaker manager after Steve Cotterill resigned on 10 October 2002. City lost all four of their games under Kevan's stewardship before Tony Pulis was appointed on 1 November. He went on to work as a coach at Burnley, before he was appointed as assistant manager at former club Notts County in 2007. He rejected an approach from Crewe Alexandra to become their assistant manager in June 2009. Following the sacking of Ian McParland on 13 October 2009, Kevan and Michael Johnson took charge for the next two games before Hans Backe was named as the new permanent Notts County manager on 27 October. Kevan again became caretaker manager when Backe resigned on 15 December. He remained in charge until he reverted to his previous role as assistant upon the appointment of Steve Cotterill as manager on 23 February 2010, just seven days later after telling the media he had 'reluctantly' agreed to stay in the role until the summer after chairman Ray Trew reasoned that "Dave's record is fantastic so why change a winning formula?" following County's FA Cup giant-killing over Premier League side Wigan Athletic. Kevan left the club when then-manager Craig Short was sacked on 24 October 2010.

Kevan joined the coaching staff at Stockport County in December 2010. He then joined Hereford United in January 2011. He re-joined former club Stoke City in June 2011, taking the position of academy team manager; this was despite signing a new contract with Hereford earlier in the month. He left Stoke in May 2013. In September 2013, Kevan joined Cheltenham Town as the first-team coach. Two months later, he joined Forest Green Rovers as assistant manager following the appointment of his former Stoke colleague, Adrian Pennock, to the managerial role at The New Lawn. Despite having helped Forest Green to a top-five place in the Conference and with just five games left in the 2014–15 season, he quit the club and re-joined Notts County as first-team coach on 31 March. He left the club when Ricardo Moniz was sacked in December 2015. He was named as new Port Vale manager John Askey's assistant in February 2019. Askey and Kevan left the club on 4 January 2021. Four months later, he accepted an offer to become Carl Dickinson's assistant at North West Counties Premier Division club Hanley Town. The club won the Midland League Premier Division title at the end of the 2021–22 season. In October 2022, Dickinson and Kevan left Hanley Town by mutual consent due to "increased business costs".

== Career statistics ==
=== As a player ===
Appearances and goals by club, season and competition
Club	Season	League			FA Cup		League Cup		Other^{[A]}		Total	
Club	Season	Division	Apps	Goals	Apps	Goals	Apps	Goals	Apps	Goals	Apps	Goals
Notts County	1985–86	Third Division	3	0	0	0	0	0	0	0	3	0
Notts County	1986–87	Third Division	33	1	3	0	0	0	2	0	38	1
Notts County	1987–88	Third Division	32	0	2	1	2	0	4	0	40	1
Notts County	1988–89	Third Division	18	2	1	0	2	0	3	0	24	2
Notts County	1989–90	Third Division	3	0	0	0	0	0	0	0	3	0
Notts County	Total		89	3	6	1	4	0	9	0	108	4
Cardiff City (loan)	1989–90	Third Division	7	0	0	0	0	0	0	0	7	0
Stoke City	1989–90	Second Division	17	0	0	0	0	0	0	0	17	0
Stoke City	1990–91	Third Division	5	0	0	0	1	0	2	0	8	0
Stoke City	1991–92	Third Division	43	1	2	0	3	0	10	0	58	1
Stoke City	1992–93	Second Division	15	1	0	0	0	0	1	0	16	1
Stoke City	1993–94	First Division	1	0	0	0	1	0	1	0	3	0
Stoke City	Total		81	2	2	0	5	0	14	0	102	2
Maidstone United (loan)	1990–91	Fourth Division	3	0	0	0	0	0	0	0	3	0
Bournemouth	1993–94	Second Division	1	0	0	0	0	0	0	0	1	0
Career total			181	5	8	1	9	0	23	0	221	6

A. The "Other" column constitutes appearances and goals in the Anglo-Italian Cup, English Football League play-offs and Football League Trophy.

=== As a manager ===
Managerial record by team and tenure
Team	From	To	Record				
Team	From	To	P	W	D	L	Win %
Stoke City (caretaker)	10 October 2002	1 November 2002	4	0	0	4	0.0
Notts County (caretaker)	13 October 2009	27 October 2009	2	1	1	0	50.0
Notts County (caretaker)	15 December 2009	23 February 2010	11	6	3	2	54.5
Total			17	7	4	6	41.2

== Honours ==
Stoke City

- Football League Second Division: 1992–93
- Associate Members' Cup: 1991–92
