= Vince Overson =

English footballer (born 1962)

Personal information
- Full name: Vincent David Overson
- Date of birth: 15 May 1962 (age 64)
- Place of birth: Kettering, England
- Height: 6 ft 2 in (1.88 m)
- Position: Central defender

Team information
- Current team: Carlisle United (Coach)

Youth career
- Corby Town
- Long Buckby
- 1978–1979: Burnley

Senior career*
| Years | Team | Apps | (Gls) |
| 1979–1986 | Burnley | 211 | (6) |
| 1986–1991 | Birmingham City | 182 | (3) |
| 1991–1996 | Stoke City | 170 | (6) |
| 1996–1998 | Burnley | 8 | (0) |
| 1997 | → Shrewsbury Town (loan) | 2 | (0) |
| 1998 | Halifax Town | 0 | (0) |
| Total | | 573 | (15) |

Managerial career
- 2003: Padiham
- 2003–2004: Ramsbottom United
- * Club domestic league appearances and goals

Vincent David Overson (born 15 May 1962) is an English former professional footballer who played as a central defender. He made nearly 600 appearances in the Football League for Burnley, Birmingham City, Stoke City and Shrewsbury Town over a 20-year career.

== Career ==
Overson was born in Kettering, Northamptonshire, and followed his brother Richard to Burnley after playing non-league football with Corby Town and Long Buckby. He turned professional in November 1979 and spent seven seasons at Turf Moor making 254 appearances scoring seven goals. During that time Burnley suffered relegation three times whilst they won the Third Division title in 1981–82.

He joined Birmingham City in June 1986 and captained Birmingham to success in the 1991 Football League Trophy where they defeated Tranmere Rovers. After making 213 appearances for Birmingham in five seasons he followed manager Lou Macari to Stoke City with a fee of £55,000 being decided at a tribunal. He fitted in well with fellow defenders John Butler, Ian Cranson and Lee Sandford and in 1991–92 Stoke reached the play-offs where they lost to Stockport County although they did beat County in the 1992 Football League Trophy Final. Stoke won the Second Division title in 1992–93 after going on a club record unbeaten run of 25 games. Overson played in 52 matches in 1993–94 and 43 in 1994–95. After playing in the first 22 matches in 1995–96 he sustained a calf injury against Sunderland and was released by the club at the end of the season after making 215 appearances.

Overson then made a return to Burnley and also had short spells with Shrewsbury Town and Halifax Town. He played for non-League team Padiham in 2002 before managing them the following year. He then managed Ramsbottom United while working with Burnley's Football in the Community scheme and coaching at their Centre of Excellence, and in 2004 was appointed head of youth development and Centre of Excellence manager at that club. He left Burnley in 2012. He then joined Bury as head of coaching.

== Career statistics ==
Appearances and goals by club, season and competition
| Club | Season | League | | | FA Cup | | League Cup | | Other | | Total | |
| Club | Season | Division | Apps | Goals | Apps | Goals | Apps | Goals | Apps | Goals | Apps | Goals |
|---|---|---|---|---|---|---|---|---|---|---|---|---|
| Burnley | 1979–80 | Second Division | 22 | 0 | 2 | 0 | 0 | 0 | 0 | 0 | 24 | 0 |
| Burnley | 1980–81 | Third Division | 39 | 1 | 3 | 0 | 1 | 0 | 2 (Note: Appearances in Anglo-Scottish Cup) | 0 | 45 | 1 |
| Burnley | 1981–82 | Third Division | 36 | 4 | 6 | 0 | 1 | 0 | 3 (Note: Appearances in Football League Group Cup) | 0 | 46 | 4 |
| Burnley | 1982–83 | Second Division | 6 | 0 | 0 | 0 | 0 | 0 | 0 | 0 | 6 | 0 |
| Burnley | 1983–84 | Third Division | 38 | 0 | 5 | 0 | 1 | 0 | 4 (Note: Appearances in Football League Trophy) | 0 | 48 | 0 |
| Burnley | 1984–85 | Third Division | 42 | 1 | 3 | 0 | 4 | 1 | 4 | 0 | 53 | 2 |
| Burnley | 1985–86 | Fourth Division | 28 | 0 | 0 | 0 | 2 | 0 | 2 | 0 | 32 | 0 |
| Burnley | Total | | 211 | 6 | 19 | 0 | 9 | 1 | 15 | 0 | 254 | 7 |
| Birmingham City | 1986–87 | Second Division | 34 | 1 | 0 | 0 | 3 | 0 | 2 (Note: Appearances in Full Members' Cup) | 0 | 39 | 1 |
| Birmingham City | 1987–88 | Second Division | 37 | 0 | 2 | 0 | 1 | 0 | 0 | 0 | 40 | 0 |
| Birmingham City | 1988–89 | Second Division | 41 | 0 | 1 | 0 | 3 | 0 | 0 | 0 | 45 | 0 |
| Birmingham City | 1989–90 | Third Division | 30 | 0 | 3 | 0 | 4 | 0 | 1 | 0 | 38 | 0 |
| Birmingham City | 1990–91 | Third Division | 40 | 2 | 2 | 0 | 1 | 0 | 8 | 1 | 51 | 3 |
| Birmingham City | Total | | 182 | 3 | 8 | 0 | 12 | 0 | 11 | 1 | 213 | 4 |
| Stoke City | 1991–92 | Third Division | 35 | 3 | 2 | 0 | 2 | 0 | 7 | 0 | 46 | 3 |
| Stoke City | 1992–93 | Second Division | 43 | 1 | 2 | 0 | 3 | 1 | 4 | 0 | 52 | 2 |
| Stoke City | 1993–94 | First Division | 39 | 2 | 4 | 0 | 4 | 0 | 5 (Note: Appearances in Anglo-Italian Cup) | 0 | 52 | 2 |
| Stoke City | 1994–95 | First Division | 35 | 0 | 2 | 0 | 1 | 0 | 5 | 0 | 43 | 0 |
| Stoke City | 1995–96 | First Division | 18 | 0 | 0 | 0 | 3 | 0 | 1 | 0 | 22 | 0 |
| Stoke City | Total | | 170 | 6 | 10 | 0 | 13 | 1 | 22 | 0 | 215 | 7 |
| Burnley | 1996–97 | Second Division | 8 | 0 | 0 | 0 | 1 | 0 | 1 | 0 | 10 | 0 |
| Shrewsbury Town (loan) | 1997–98 | Third Division | 2 | 0 | 0 | 0 | 0 | 0 | 0 | 0 | 2 | 0 |
| Halifax Town | 1998–99 | Third Division | 0 | 0 | 0 | 0 | 1 | 0 | 0 | 0 | 1 | 0 |
| Career total | | | 573 | 15 | 37 | 0 | 36 | 2 | 49 | 1 | 695 | 18 |

== Honours ==
Burnley

- Football League Third Division: 1981–82

Birmingham City

- Associate Members' Cup: 1990–91

Stoke City

- Football League Second Division: 1992–93
- Associate Members' Cup: 1991–92

Individual

- PFA Team of the Year: 1991–92 Third Division, 1992–93 Second Division
