= 1992 Associate Members' Cup final =

1992 Associate Members' Cup Final
- Event: 1991–92 Associate Members' Cup
Stoke City	Stockport County
1	0
- Date: 16 May 1992
- Venue: Wembley Stadium, London
- Referee: Robbie Hart (Darlington)
- Attendance: 48,339

The 1992 Associate Members' Cup Final, known as the Autoglass Trophy for sponsorship reasons, was the 9th final of the domestic football cup competition for teams from the Third Division and Fourth Division. The final was played at Wembley Stadium, London on 16 May 1992, and was contested by Stoke City and Stockport County. Stoke won the match 1–0, with Mark Stein scoring the only goal of the game.

== Background ==
The 1991–92 season saw both Stockport County and Stoke City involved in the race for promotion to the Second Division. The season ended with Stoke in 4th position and Stockport in 5th with just a point separating the two sides. They faced each other in the end of season play-offs. The first leg saw Stockport win 1–0 thanks to a Lee Todd free-kick and in the second leg at the Victoria Ground Stockport scored in the first few minutes and despite Mark Stein pulling one back Stockport went through 2–1 on aggregate.

== Route to the final ==
Stoke began the competition in the southern section whilst Stockport where in the northern section. Stoke advanced past Walsall 2–0 and Birmingham City 3–1 and Stockport recovered from a 4–0 defeat at Carlisle United to beat York City 3–0. In the first round Stoke beat Cardiff City 3–0 whilst County gained revenge on Carlisle beating them 3–1. The quarter finals saw Stoke beat Walsall 3–1 and Stockport record a 3–0 win over Hartlepool United. Both sides where then involved in close semi-finals City beating Leyton Orient and County getting the better of Crewe Alexandra winning 2–1. In the area finals Stoke and Peterborough United shared three goals in an exciting 3–3 and a Paul Ware goal earned Stoke a 2nd leg victory. Stockport had an easier tie beating Burnley 3–1.

Home teams listed first.

=== Stoke City ===
Preliminary round: Walsall 0–2 Stoke City

Preliminary round: Stoke City 3–1 Birmingham City

First round: Stoke City 3–0 Cardiff City

Quarter final: Stoke City 3–1 Walsall

Semi final: Leyton Orient 0–1 Stoke City

Area final 1st leg: Stoke City 3–3 Peterborough United

Area final 2nd leg: Peterborough United 0–1 Stoke City

=== Stockport County ===
Preliminary round: Carlisle United 4–0 Stockport County

Preliminary round: Stockport County 3–0 York City

First round: Carlisle United 1–3 Stockport County

Quarter final: Stockport County 3–0 Hartlepool United

Semi final: Crewe Alexandra 1–2 Stockport County

Area final 1st leg: Burnley 0–1 Stockport County

Area final 2nd leg: Stockport County 2–1 Burnley

== Match review ==
The two sides had met just three days prior the final in the Football League play-offs with Stockport coming out on top. County began the first half the better of the two teams and Paul Wheeler had the ball in the back of the Stoke net after six minutes but was disallowed for a foul on Stoke 'keeper Peter Fox. The rest of the first half was end-to-end with Wayne Biggins and Lee Sandford going close for City whilst Fox had to pull off a fine save to deny Wheeler. In the second half, Stockport began to tire and Stoke took full advantage, Ian Cranson hit a long ball forward on 65 minutes only for Lee Todd to clear away but was returned by Vince Overson, leaving Lee Sandford free to flick the ball on to Mark Stein on the edge of the County area. Stein beat two Stockport defenders before smashing a powerful shot past Neil Edwards. Stoke had to withstand pressure from Stockport attacks but held firm to claim their first Associate Members' Cup victory.

== Match details ==
16 May 1992

Stoke City	1–0	Stockport County
Stein 65'

Wembley Stadium, London
Attendance: 48,339
Referee: Robbie Hart (Darlington)

GK	1	(England) Peter Fox
DF	2	(England) John Butler
DF	3	(Scotland) Dave Kevan
DF	4	(England) Ian Cranson
DF	5	(England) Vince Overson
DF	6	(England) Lee Sandford
MF	7	(England) Tony Kelly
MF	8	(England) Steve Foley
FW	9	(England) Mark Stein
FW	10	(England) Wayne Biggins
MF	11	(England) Adrian Heath
Substitutes:
DF	12	(Republic of Ireland) Ashley Grimes
FW	13	(England) Paul Barnes
Manager:
(Scotland) Lou Macari

GK	1	(Wales) Neil Edwards
DF	2	(England) Darren Knowles
DF	3	(England) Lee Todd
DF	4	(England) David Frain	Substituted off
DF	5	(England) Tony Barras
MF	6	(England) Bill Williams
MF	7	(Republic of Ireland) Jim Gannon
MF	8	(England) Peter Ward
MF	9	(Saint Kitts and Nevis) Kevin Francis
FW	10	(England) Chris Beaumont
FW	11	(Wales) Paul Wheeler	Substituted off
Substitutes:
DF	12	(England) Andy Thorpe	Substituted on
DF	13	(England) Paul Williams	Substituted on
Manager:
(Uruguay) Danny Bergara
