= Carl Beeston =

English footballer

Personal information
- Full name: Carl Frederick Beeston
- Date of birth: 30 June 1967 (age 59)
- Place of birth: Stoke-on-Trent, England
- Height: 5 ft 9 in (1.75 m)
- Position: Midfielder

Senior career*
Years	Team	Apps	(Gls)
1985–1997	Stoke City	236	(13)
1997	→ Hereford United (loan)	9	(2)
1997	Southend United	6	(0)
1997–1999	Hednesford Town		
1999–2000	Stafford Rangers		
Total		251	(15)

International career
1988	England U21	1	(0)
- * Club domestic league appearances and goals

Carl Frederick Beeston (born 30 June 1967) is an English former footballer who played in the Football League as a midfielder for Stoke City, Hereford United and Southend United. He was capped once for England under-21s in 1988. He also played non-league football for Hednesford Town and Stafford Rangers.

== Career ==
Beeston was born in Stoke-on-Trent and progressed through the youth ranks at Stoke City making his first team debut against Coventry City on the final day of 1984–85 season with Stoke already relegated. He played six matches in 1985–86 scoring his first senior goal in the Full Members Cup against Coventry. He was missing from the entire 1986–87 season due to contracting glandular fever. He returned to the side and became a vital member of Mick Mills' first team displaying good form as a 'box-to-box' midfielder with an eye for a spectacular goal which earned him a call up to the England U21 side.

Stoke had an awful 1989–90 season which ended with relegation to the third tier which was followed by their lowest league finish of 14th in 1990–91. New manager Lou Macari came in and set about turning around Stoke's fortunes and Beeston played a vital part. He played 57 matches in 1991–92 as Stoke reached the Football League play-offs, losing to Stockport County, although they did beat County in the final of the Football League Trophy.

Beeston played 32 times in 1992–93 as Stoke won the Division Two title but over the summer he had to have his ankle rebuilt by surgeons and he had to miss the entire 1993–94 season. After his return from injury he was never able to reproduce his form in centre midfield and so was used on the right wing and helped Stoke reach the play-offs in 1995–96, losing out to Leicester City. He played 18 times in 1996–97 in what was his final season at the Victoria Ground and left for Southend United after previously spending time out on loan at Hereford United. He brought his career to an end with non-league Hednesford Town and Stafford Rangers.

== Career statistics ==
Appearances and goals by club, season and competition
Club	Season	League			FA Cup		League Cup		Other		Total	
Club	Season	Division	Apps	Goals	Apps	Goals	Apps	Goals	Apps	Goals	Apps	Goals
Stoke City	1984–85	First Division	1	0	0	0	0	0	—		1	0
Stoke City	1985–86	Second Division	5	0	0	0	0	0	1 (Note: Appearances in Full Members' Cup)	1	6	1
Stoke City	1986–87	Second Division	0	0	0	0	0	0	0	0	0	0
Stoke City	1987–88	Second Division	12	0	0	0	0	0	1	0	13	0
Stoke City	1988–89	Second Division	23	2	0	0	2	0	0	0	25	2
Stoke City	1989–90	Second Division	38	2	1	0	1	0	1	0	41	2
Stoke City	1990–91	Third Division	37	2	3	0	3	0	1 (Note: Appearances in Football League Trophy)	0	44	2
Stoke City	1991–92	Third Division	43	3	2	1	4	1	8 (Note: Seven appearances and one goal in Football League Trophy and one appearance in the Third Division play-offs)	1	57	6
Stoke City	1992–93	Second Division	27	3	2	0	1	0	2	0	32	3
Stoke City	1993–94	First Division	0	0	0	0	0	0	0	0	0	0
Stoke City	1994–95	First Division	16	1	0	0	1	0	1 (Note: Appearance in Anglo-Italian Cup)	0	18	1
Stoke City	1995–96	First Division	16	0	0	0	0	0	0	0	16	0
Stoke City	1996–97	First Division	18	0	0	0	0	0	—		18	0
Stoke City	Total		236	13	8	1	12	1	15	2	271	17
Hereford United (loan)	1996–97	Third Division	9	2	0	0	0	0	0	0	9	2
Southend United	1997–98	Second Division	6	0	0	0	3	0	0	0	9	0
Career total			251	15	8	1	15	1	15	2	289	19

== Honours ==
Stoke City

- Football League Second Division: 1992–93
- Associate Members' Cup: 1991–92
