= Paul Rennie =

English footballer

Personal information
- Full name: Paul Andrew Rennie
- Date of birth: 26 October 1971 (age 55)
- Place of birth: Crewe, England
- Position: Defender

Youth career
- 1987–1989: Crewe Alexandra

Senior career*
Years	Team	Apps	(Gls)
1989–1990	Crewe Alexandra	2	(0)
1990–1992	Stoke City	4	(0)
1993–1995	Wigan Athletic	40	(3)
1996	Nantwich Town	?	(2)
Total		46	(5)
- * Club domestic league appearances and goals

Paul Andrew Rennie (born 26 October 1971) is an English former footballer who played for Crewe Alexandra, Stoke City and Wigan Athletic.

== Career ==
Rennie began his career with his hometown club Crewe Alexandra playing twice during the 1989–90 season. He left for nearby Stoke City in the summer of 1990 but in his two seasons at the Victoria Ground he failed to make an impression playing in just six matches. He then played two seasons with Wigan Athletic before dropping into non-league football with Nantwich Town.

== Career statistics ==
Appearances and goals by club, season and competition
Club	Season	League			FA Cup		League Cup		Other^{[A]}		Total	
Club	Season	Division	Apps	Goals	Apps	Goals	Apps	Goals	Apps	Goals	Apps	Goals
Crewe Alexandra	1989–90	Third Division	2	0	0	0	0	0	0	0	2	0
Stoke City	1990–91	Third Division	3	0	1	0	0	0	0	0	4	0
Stoke City	1991–92	Third Division	1	0	0	0	0	0	1	0	2	0
Stoke City	1992–93	Second Division	0	0	0	0	0	0	0	0	0	0
Stoke City	Total		4	0	1	0	0	0	1	0	6	0
Wigan Athletic	1993–94	Third Division	26	2	3	0	2	0	1	0	32	2
Wigan Athletic	1994–95	Third Division	14	1	1	0	4	1	2	0	21	2
Wigan Athletic	Total		40	3	4	0	6	1	3	0	53	4
Career Total			46	3	5	0	6	1	4	0	61	4

A. The "Other" column constitutes appearances and goals in the Football League Trophy.

== Honours ==
Stoke City

- Football League Trophy : 1991–92
