= 1991–92 Stoke City F.C. season =

Stoke City
1991–92 season
- Chairman: Peter Coates
- Manager: Lou Macari
- Football League Third Division: 4th (77 Points)
- Play-offs: Semi-final
- FA Cup: First round
- League Cup: Second round
- League Trophy: Winners
- Top goalscorer: League: Wayne Biggins (22 goals); All: Wayne Biggins (28 goals)
- Highest home attendance: 23,645 vs West Bromwich Albion (12 February 1992)
- Lowest home attendance: 8,419 vs Wigan Athletic (14 December 1991)
- Average home league attendance: 13,007
Home colours

The 1991–92 season was Stoke City's 85th season in the Football League and 3rd in the Third Division.

Lou Macari was appointed as Stoke City manager in June 1991 with the hope that he would be the man to bring life back into the club. He made an instant impact and Stoke were fully involved in the fight for promotion and it was very nearly achieved. Stoke reached the Football League play-offs for the first time but lost 2–1 on aggregate to Stockport County, Stoke did however beat County at Wembley in the final of the Football League Trophy. Stoke did well in terms of goalscoring with both Wayne Biggins and new signing Mark Stein scoring 20+.

== Season review ==
=== League ===
The board appointed former Birmingham City manager Lou Macari on 18 June 1991. Macari had a glittering career at the highest level of the game. He was seen as a man who knew what was required to achieve results and he wasted no time in altering his squad. He brought in Steve Foley (£50,000 from Swindon Town), Vince Overson (£55,000 from Birmingham City), Ronnie Sinclair (£25,000 from Bristol City) and forward Mark Stein from Oxford United for what turned out to be a bargain £100,000.

From the previous season's all-time low Stoke under Macari rose to great heights in 1991–92 and reached a Wembley final for the first time since 1972. In the Third Division Stoke were in the hunt for automatic promotion all season eventually having to settle for a play-off place where they came up against Stockport County. The first leg at Edgeley Park saw County win 1–0 thanks to a free-kick from Lee Todd after Carl Beeston had been sent-off and in the second leg Stoke went behind in the first minute and despite Stein pulling one back Stoke went out 2–1 on aggregate. Despite the obvious disappointment of missing out on promotion it was a positive season for Stoke and there was high hopes that it could be the start of the club's revival.

=== FA Cup ===
Stoke again drew non-league Telford United but this time the "Bucks" gained revenge beating Stoke 2–1.

=== League Cup ===
After beating Chesterfield in the first round Stoke drew Liverpool in the second and in the first leg at Anfield almost 8,000 Stoke fans made the trip to see Stoke make a great contest and come away with a 2–2 draw. Stoke again put up a fight in the second leg but went out of the competition losing 3–2.

=== League Trophy ===
After qualifying from their group which included Birmingham City and Walsall, Stoke then advanced past Cardiff City, Walsall (for a second time), Leyton Orient and Peterborough United with Paul Ware scoring the vital goal to send Stoke through to Wembley. In the final against Stockport County a single goal from Mark Stein gave Stoke a 1–0 victory.

== Final league table ==
Pos	Team	Pld	W	D	L	GF	GA	GD	Pts	Promotion or relegation
2	Birmingham City (P)	46	23	12	11	69	52	+17	81	Promotion to the First Division (Note: From the 1992–93 season, the second tier - then known as the Second Division - was renamed to the First Division, the third tier - then known as the Third Division - was renamed to the Second Division, and the fourth tier - then known as the Fourth Division - was renamed to the Third Division.)
3	Huddersfield Town	46	22	12	12	59	38	+21	78	Qualification for the Third Division play-offs
4	Stoke City	46	21	14	11	69	49	+20	77	Qualification for the Third Division play-offs
5	Stockport County	46	22	10	14	75	51	+24	76	Qualification for the Third Division play-offs
6	Peterborough United (O, P)	46	20	14	12	65	58	+7	74	Qualification for the Third Division play-offs

(O) Play-off winners; (P) Promoted

== Results ==
=== Legend ===
Win	Draw	Loss

=== Football League Third Division ===
Match	Date	Opponent	Venue	Result	Attendance	Scorers
1	17 August 1991	Bradford City	A	0–1	7,556	
2	24 August 1991	Bournemouth	H	1–1	10,011	Biggins 17' (pen)
3	31 August 1991	Peterborough United	A	1–1	7,174	Biggins 1'
4	4 September 1991	Shrewsbury Town	H	1–0	10,182	Biggins 53'
5	7 September 1991	Darlington	A	1–0	4,230	Ellis 57'
6	14 September 1991	Fulham	H	2–2	10,567	Biggins 25', Cranson 53'
7	17 September 1991	Hartlepool United	H	3–2	9,394	Biggins (2) 37', 39', Butler 75'
8	21 September 1991	Preston North End	A	2–2	6,345	Biggins (2) 41', 59'
9	28 September 1991	Stockport County	H	2–2	6,345	Biggins (2) 14', 28' (1 pen)
10	5 October 1991	Chester City	A	0–0	4,212	
11	12 October 1991	Bolton Wanderers	H	2–0	12,420	Biggins 16', Scott 80'
12	19 October 1991	Swansea City	A	1–2	3,365	Ellis 88'
13	26 October 1991	Leyton Orient	H	2–0	9,555	Biggins 36', Cranson 71'
14	2 November 1991	Huddersfield Town	H	0–2	10,116	
15	5 November 1991	Bury	A	3–1	3,245	Ellis (2) 3', 78', Overson 83'
16	19 November 1991	Exeter City	A	0–0	5,309	
17	23 November 1991	Torquay United	H	3–0	9,124	Biggins 2', Stein (2) 34', 60'
18	30 November 1991	West Bromwich Albion	A	2–2	17,207	Overson (2) 40', 52'
19	14 December 1991	Wigan Athletic	H	3–0	8,419	Stein 17', Kelly 43', Biggins 81'
20	21 December 1991	Bournemouth	A	2–1	5,436	Biggins 10', Kelly 76'
21	26 December 1991	Peterborough United	H	3–3	14,733	Kevan 7', Stein 30', Biggins 70'
22	28 December 1991	Bradford City	H	0–0	12,208	
23	1 January 1992	Shrewsbury Town	A	0–1	8,557	
24	4 January 1992	Birmingham City	H	2–1	18,914	Ware 52', Biggins 77'
25	11 January 1992	Brentford	A	0–2	9,004	
26	18 January 1992	Reading	H	3–0	10,835	Jones 24' (o.g.), Butler 54', Stein 71'
27	25 January 1992	Hull City	A	1–0	4,996	Russell 20'
28	1 February 1992	Swansea City	H	2–1	11,299	Ware 41', Beeston 90'
29	8 February 1992	Leyton Orient	A	1–0	7,153	Beeston 4'
30	12 February 1992	West Bromwich Albion	H	1–0	23,645	Stein 28'
31	15 February 1992	Wigan Athletic	A	0–1	5,695	
32	22 February 1992	Brentford	H	2–1	16,417	Butler 10', Stein 65'
33	29 February 1992	Birmingham City	A	1–1	22,162	Barnes 89'
34	4 March 1992	Reading	A	4–3	4,362	Stein 28', Foley 30', Ware 60', McPherson 66' (o.g.)
35	7 March 1992	Hull City	H	2–3	13,563	Barnes 52', Stein 73'
36	11 March 1992	Bury	H	1–2	12,385	Barnes 85'
37	14 March 1992	Huddersfield Town	A	2–1	10,156	Biggins 27', Stein 28'
38	21 March 1992	Exeter City	H	5–2	13,634	Biggins 16', Stein 33', Beeston 42', Grimes 61', Steele 90'
39	28 March 1992	Torquay United	A	0–1	3,260	
40	31 March 1992	Fulham	A	1–1	5,779	Stein 72'
41	3 April 1992	Darlington	H	3–0	13,579	Biggins (2) 10', 20' (1 pen), Stein 69'
42	11 April 1992	Hartlepool United	A	1–1	4,360	Stein 44'
43	18 April 1992	Preston North End	H	2–1	16,151	Stein 44', Biggins 50' (pen)
44	20 April 1992	Stockport County	A	0–0	8,129	
45	25 April 1992	Chester City	H	0–1	18,474	
46	2 May 1992	Bolton Wanderers	A	1–3	9,997	Stein 7'

=== Third Division play-offs ===
Round	Date	Opponent	Venue	Result	Attendance	Scorers
Semi-final 1st Leg	10 May 1992	Stockport County	A	0–1	7,537	
Semi-final 2nd Leg	13 May 1992	Stockport County	H	1–1	16,170	Stein 81'

=== FA Cup ===
Round	Date	Opponent	Venue	Result	Attendance	Scorers
R1	15 November 1991	Telford United	H	0–0	9,974	
R1 Replay	26 November 1991	Telford United	A	1–2	4,032	Biggins 81'

=== League Cup ===
Round	Date	Opponent	Venue	Result	Attendance	Scorers
R1 1st Leg	23 August 1991	Chesterfield	H	1–0	7,815	Ellis 20'
R1 2nd Leg	27 August 1991	Chesterfield	A	2–1	5,391	Kelly 22', Beeston 68'
R2 1st Leg	25 September 1991	Liverpool	A	2–2	18,389	Cranson 28', Kelly 88'
R2 2nd Leg	10 October 1991	Liverpool	H	2–3	22,355	Biggins (2) 75', 88' (1 pen)

=== League Trophy ===
Round	Date	Opponent	Venue	Result	Attendance	Scorers
Preliminary Round 1	22 October 1991	Walsall	A	2–0	3,758	Sandford (2) 51', 70'
Preliminary Round 2	18 December 1991	Birmingham City	H	3–1	5,982	Barnes 15', Stein 29' (pen), Ware 73'
Southern Round 1	14 January 1992	Cardiff City	H	3–0	4,851	Biggins (2) 31', 80', Stein 76'
Southern Quarter Final	2 February 1992	Walsall	H	3–1	7,381	Ware 18', Beeston 24', Stein 32'
Southern Semi Final	17 March 1992	Leyton Orient	A	1–0	3,792	Stein 24'
Southern Final 1st Leg	6 April 1992	Peterborough United	H	3–3	14,355	Biggins (2) 3', 5', Sandford 66'
Southern Final 2nd Leg	15 April 1992	Peterborough United	A	1–0	12,214	Ware 51'
Final	16 May 1992	Stockport County	N	1–0	48,339	Stein 65'

=== Isle of Man Trophy ===
Round	Opponent	Result
Quarter Final	Isle of Man XI	7–0
Semi Final	SC Cambuur	2–0
Final	Sunderland	2–0

=== Friendlies ===
Match	Opponent	Venue	Result
1	Witton Albion	A	2–2
2	Worcester City	A	3–1
3	Newcastle Town	A	1–0
4	Aldershot	A	4–1
5	Rocester	A	2–1
6	Newcastle Town	A	1–0
7	Kidsgrove Athletic	A	2–1
8	Leek Town	A	5–0
9	Munster XI	A	5–0

== Squad statistics ==
Pos.	Name	League		FA Cup		League Cup		League Trophy		Play-offs		Total	
Pos.	Name	Apps	Goals	Apps	Goals	Apps	Goals	Apps	Goals	Apps	Goals	Apps	Goals
GK	(England) Peter Fox	0	0	2	0	4	0	5	0	0	0	11	0
GK	(Australia) Jason Kearton	16	0	0	0	0	0	1	0	0	0	17	0
GK	(England) Kevin Pressman	4	0	0	0	0	0	2	0	0	0	6	0
GK	(Scotland) Ronnie Sinclair	26	0	0	0	0	0	0	0	2	0	28	0
DF	(Jamaica) Noel Blake	12(1)	0	0(1)	0	2	0	1(1)	0	2	0	17(3)	0
DF	(England) John Butler	42	3	1	0	4	0	7	0	2	0	56	3
DF	(England) Ian Cranson	41	2	2	0	4	1	8	0	2	0	57	3
DF	(England) Lee Fowler	15(1)	0	1	0	4	0	1	0	2	0	23(1)	0
DF	(England) Tony Gallimore	2(1)	0	0	0	0	0	0	0	0	0	2(1)	0
DF	(England) Vince Overson	34(1)	3	2	0	2	0	7	0	0	0	45(1)	3
DF	(England) Paul Rennie	1	0	0	0	0	0	0(1)	0	0	0	1(1)	0
DF	(England) Lee Sandford	37(1)	0	2	0	3	0	8	3	2	0	52(1)	3
DF	(England) Ian Wright	3	0	0	0	0(1)	0	0	0	0	0	3(1)	0
MF	(England) Carl Beeston	42(1)	3	2	1	4	1	7	1	1	0	56(1)	6
MF	(Republic of Ireland) Ashley Grimes	4(6)	1	0	0	0	0	1(2)	0	2	0	7(8)	1
MF	(Republic of Ireland) Mick Kennedy	19(1)	0	2	0	3	0	1	0	0	0	25(1)	0
MF	(Scotland) Dave Kevan	43	1	2	0	2(1)	0	8	0	2	0	57(1)	1
MF	(England) Ian Scott	6(3)	1	1	0	3	0	1	0	0	0	11(3)	1
MF	(England) Paul Ware	22(2)	3	1	0	0	0	4(1)	3	0	0	27(3)	6
FW	(England) Paul Barnes	3(10)	3	0	0	1(1)	0	2(1)	1	0	0	6(12)	4
FW	(England) Junior Bent	1	0	0	0	0	0	0	0	0	0	1	0
FW	(England) Wayne Biggins	41	22	2	0	4	2	5	4	2	0	54	28
FW	(England) Tony Ellis	9(6)	4	0(2)	0	2(1)	1	1(2)	0	0	0	12(11)	5
FW	(England) Steve Foley	20	1	0	0	0	0	5	0	1	0	26	1
FW	(England) Adrian Heath	5(1)	0	0	0	0	0	3	0	0(1)	0	8(2)	0
FW	(England) Tony Kelly	10(3)	2	0	0	3(1)	2	3	0	0(1)	0	16(5)	4
FW	(England) Jason Percival	0	0	0	0	0	0	0	0	0	0	0	0
FW	(England) Kevin Russell	5	1	0	0	0	0	0	0	0	0	5	1
FW	(England) Tim Steele	7	1	0	0	0	0	0	0	0	0	7	1
FW	(England) Mark Stein	36	16	2	0	0	0	7	5	2	1	47	22
–	Own goals	–	2	–	0	–	0	–	0	–	0	–	2
