= Ian Cranson =

English footballer

Personal information
- Full name: Ian Cranson
- Date of birth: 2 July 1964 (age 62)
- Place of birth: Easington, England
- Height: 6 ft 0 in (1.83 m)
- Position: Defender

Youth career
- Ipswich Town

Senior career*
Years	Team	Apps	(Gls)
1982–1988	Ipswich Town	131	(5)
1988–1989	Sheffield Wednesday	30	(0)
1989–1996	Stoke City	223	(9)
Total		384	(14)

International career
1984–1986	England U21	5	(1)
- * Club domestic league appearances and goals

Ian Cranson (born 2 July 1964) is an English former professional footballer for played for Ipswich Town, Sheffield Wednesday and Stoke City.

== Playing career ==
Born in Easington, County Durham, Cranson began his career with Ipswich Town and made his professional debut away at Aston Villa in 1983–84. He soon became a regular at Portman Road under the management of Bobby Ferguson and was ever present in 1985–86 as Ipswich suffered relegation from the First Division. He played 39 games in 1986–87 and 35 in 1987–88 before he joined Sheffield Wednesday in March 1988. Cranson was a regular in Wednesday's side until manager Howard Wilkinson was replaced by Ron Atkinson and he lost his place in the side. In the summer of 1989 he joined former Ipswich Town teammate Mick Mills at Stoke City for a club record fee of £480,000. He was one of a number of expensive signings that summer as Stoke looked to mount a push for promotion. However the new signings never gelled and Stoke ended up being relegated and Mills being replaced by Alan Ball. Cranson made 19 appearances in 1989–90 missing most of the campaign due to a knee injury. He had surgery to rebuild his knee in the summer of 1990 only for the problem to flare up again in 1990–91 and he managed only 13 appearances.

Cranson finally recovered from his injury in 1991 and new manager Lou Macari decided to use him as a sweeper and he became a consistent performer for the Potters. He played in 57 matches in 1991–92 helping Stoke to reach the play-offs where they lost to Stockport County although they did beat County in the 1992 Football League Trophy Final. He played 55 times in 1992–93 missing just one match as City claimed the Second Division title. He missed just two in 1993–94 and his performances were rewarded with the player of the year award. He made 47 appearances in 1994–95 and played 27 times in 1995–96 helping Stoke reach the play-offs. However Cranson injured his knee again and missed the play-offs as Stoke lost to Leicester City. He was made captain for the 1996–97 but injured his knee for a fourth time against Barnsley in September and retired on the advice of doctors. He was granted a testimonial at the Victoria Ground against Everton.

== After retirement ==
After retiring in 1996 Cranson took a year out of the sport before returning to Stoke to work as a coach at the Stoke City Academy before becoming reserve team manager a position he held until he left in 2003. As of November 2010 Cranson is a self-employed coach working for the Wolverhampton Wanderers Academy, for Stafford Borough Council and for the City of Stoke Sixth-Form College at Fenton.

Cranson is currently the head coach of the men's senior football team at Staffordshire University. He is a regular contributor to BBC Radio Stoke’s coverage of Stoke City.

== Career statistics ==
Appearances and goals by club, season and competition
Club	Season	League			FA Cup		League Cup		Other		Total	
Club	Season	Division	Apps	Goals	Apps	Goals	Apps	Goals	Apps	Goals	Apps	Goals
Ipswich Town	1983–84	First Division	8	0	0	0	0	0	—		8	0
Ipswich Town	1984–85	First Division	20	1	5	0	6	0	—		31	1
Ipswich Town	1985–86	First Division	42	1	5	0	5	0	0	0	52	1
Ipswich Town	1986–87	Second Division	32	2	1	0	1	0	5 (Note: Appearances in Full Members' Cup)	0	39	2
Ipswich Town	1987–88	Second Division	29	1	1	0	3	0	2	0	35	1
Ipswich Town	Total		131	5	12	0	15	0	7	0	165	5
Sheffield Wednesday	1987–88	First Division	4	0	0	0	0	0	0	0	4	0
Sheffield Wednesday	1988–89	First Division	26	0	2	0	2	0	1	0	31	0
Sheffield Wednesday	Total		30	0	2	0	2	0	1	0	35	0
Stoke City	1989–90	Second Division	17	2	0	0	2	0	0	0	19	2
Stoke City	1990–91	Third Division	9	0	3	0	0	0	1 (Note: Appearances in Football League Trophy)	0	13	0
Stoke City	1991–92	Third Division	41	2	2	0	4	1	10 (Note: Eight appearances in Football League Trophy and two in Third Division play-offs)	0	57	3
Stoke City	1992–93	Second Division	45	3	2	0	4	0	4	0	55	3
Stoke City	1993–94	First Division	44	0	4	1	3	0	6 (Note: Appearances in Anglo-Italian Cup)	1	57	2
Stoke City	1994–95	First Division	37	1	2	0	3	0	5	0	47	1
Stoke City	1995–96	First Division	24	1	1	0	1	0	1	0	27	1
Stoke City	1996–97	First Division	6	0	0	0	0	0	—		6	0
Stoke City	Total		223	9	14	1	17	1	27	1	281	12
Career total			384	14	28	1	34	1	35	1	481	17

== Honours ==
Stoke City

- Football League Second Division: 1992–93
- Associate Members' Cup: 1991–92

Individual

- Stoke City Player of the Year: 1993–94
