= Paul Ware =

English footballer

Personal information
- Full name: Paul David Ware
- Date of birth: 7 November 1970
- Place of birth: Congleton, England
- Date of death: 17 April 2013 (aged 42)
- Place of death: Sandbach, England
- Position: Midfielder

Youth career
- 1985–1987: Stoke City

Senior career*
Years	Team	Apps	(Gls)
1987–1994	Stoke City	115	(10)
1994–1997	Stockport County	54	(4)
1996–1997	→ Cardiff City (loan)	5	(0)
1997–1999	Hednesford Town		
1999–2000	Macclesfield Town	18	(2)
1999–2000	→ Nuneaton Borough (loan)	3	(3)
2000–2002	Rochdale	38	(2)
2002	Hednesford Town		
Total		233	(21)
- * Club domestic league appearances and goals

Paul David Ware (7 November 1970 – 17 April 2013) was an English footballer who played in the Football League for Cardiff City, Macclesfield Town, Nuneaton Borough, Rochdale, Stockport County and Stoke City.

Ware began his career with local side Stoke City making his debut in 1987–88. He became a popular player amongst the Stoke support and scored the winning goal against Peterborough United to see Stoke through to the 1992 Football League Trophy Final where they beat Stockport County 1–0. Ware played a major role in 1992–93 which saw Stoke win the Second Division title before he was sold to Stockport County in September 1994. Ware then went on to play for Cardiff City, Hednesford Town, Macclesfield Town, Nuneaton Borough, and Rochdale before ending his playing career with a return to Hednesford. After his playing career had ended he battled against a brain tumour and he died on 17 April 2013 aged 42.

In 2018 a street was named in his honour on the Victoria Park housing development built on the former Stoke City Football Ground.

== Career ==
Ware was born in Congleton and started his career in Stoke City's youth team before being handed a professional contract in 1987. He made his debut against Shrewsbury Town on the final day of the 1987–88 season. He played 15 times in 1988–89 scoring in a 1–0 victory away at Bournemouth. In 1989–90 Ware played in 19 matches as Stoke suffered relegation to the Third Division and the 1990–91 season saw Stoke finish in their lowest league position with Ware playing in 40 matches. Stoke's fortunes began to improve under new manager Lou Macari and Ware scored the winning goal against Peterborough United in the area final of the Football League Trophy sending Stoke through to play Stockport County at Wembley. Unfortunately for Ware, he missed the final due to injury as Stoke won 1–0. He played in 35 matches in 1992–93 as Stoke gained promotion back to the second tier.

He then joined Stockport County in September 1994 and spent three years at Edgeley Park which ended with him helping the club gain promotion in 1996–97. He spent time out on loan at Cardiff City and then spent two seasons at non-league Hednesford Town before joining Macclesfield Town. He then played on loan for Nuneaton Borough and ended his professional career with Rochdale before making a return to Hednesford Town.

== Death ==
In 2012 Ware had an operation to remove a brain tumour. He died in the early morning on 17 April 2013 after his health deteriorated having previously been in remission.

"As a player, Paul only ever had one thing in his mind, and that was doing well for Stoke City. That was reflected in what people thought about him. He was an honest, genuine person and player who was very popular with the supporters, probably even more so after he scored that goal at Peterborough to get us to Wembley. There wasn't a happier dressing room in the country at the time. It was a great group of down-to-earth lads, and none was more down to earth than Paul Ware. I look at his attitude and character and then look at some of the players who are in the Premier League these days. There is absolutely no comparison. Paul always had a smile on his face and always went about his job in the proper way. When he wasn't in the side, he was no problem, he just got on with his job. He was one of those players who was just delighted to be playing for Stoke City and gave everything for the club "

— Former Stoke manager Lou Macari pays tribute to Paul Ware.

As part of the redevelopment of the Former Victoria Ground, Victoria Park in Stoke has a street named in his honour.

== Career statistics ==
Appearances and goals by club, season and competition
Club	Season	League			FA Cup		League Cup		Other^{[A]}		Total	
Club	Season	Division	Apps	Goals	Apps	Goals	Apps	Goals	Apps	Goals	Apps	Goals
Stoke City	1987–88	Second Division	1	0	0	0	0	0	0	0	1	0
Stoke City	1988–89	Second Division	11	1	2	0	1	0	1	0	15	1
Stoke City	1989–90	Second Division	16	0	1	0	1	0	1	0	19	0
Stoke City	1990–91	Third Division	34	2	1	0	3	0	2	0	40	2
Stoke City	1991–92	Third Division	24	3	1	0	0	0	5	3	30	6
Stoke City	1992–93	Second Division	28	4	0	0	3	0	4	1	35	5
Stoke City	1993–94	First Division	1	0	0	0	0	0	0	0	1	0
Stoke City	Total		115	10	5	0	8	0	13	4	141	14
Stockport County	1994–95	Second Division	19	1	1	0	2	0	1	0	23	1
Stockport County	1995–96	Second Division	27	3	2	0	4	0	1	1	34	4
Stockport County	1996–97	Second Division	8	0	0	0	1	1	1	0	10	1
Stockport County	Total		54	4	3	0	7	1	3	1	67	6
Cardiff City (loan)	1996–97	Third Division	5	0	0	0	0	0	0	0	5	0
Macclesfield Town	1999–2000	Third Division	18	2	0	0	1	0	0	0	19	2
Nuneaton Borough (loan)	1999–2000	Conference National	3	3	0	0	0	0	0	0	3	3
Rochdale	2000–01	Third Division	30	2	1	0	2	0	1	0	34	2
Rochdale	2001–02	Third Division	8	0	0	0	1	0	0	0	9	0
Rochdale	Total		38	2	1	0	3	0	1	0	43	2
Career total			233	21	9	0	19	1	17	5	278	27

A. The "Other" column constitutes appearances and goals in the Football League Trophy and Full Members Cup.

== Honours ==
Stoke City

- Football League Second Division: 1992–93
- Associate Members' Cup: 1991–92

Stockport County

- Football League Second Division runner-up: 1996–97
