= Wayne Biggins =

English footballer (born 1961)

Personal information
- Full name: Wayne Biggins
- Date of birth: 20 November 1961 (age 64)
- Place of birth: Sheffield, England
- Height: 5 ft 10 in (1.78 m)
- Position: Striker

Youth career
- Lincoln City

Senior career*
Years	Team	Apps	(Gls)
1980–1981	Lincoln City	8	(1)
1981–1982	Matlock Town		
1982–1983	King's Lynn		
1983–1984	Matlock Town		
1984–1985	Burnley	78	(29)
1985–1988	Norwich City	79	(16)
1988–1989	Manchester City	32	(9)
1989–1992	Stoke City	122	(46)
1992–1993	Barnsley	47	(16)
1993–1994	Celtic	9	(0)
1994–1995	Stoke City	27	(6)
1995	→ Luton Town (loan)	7	(1)
1995	Oxford United	10	(1)
1995–1997	Wigan Athletic	51	(5)
1997–1998	Leek Town		
1998–2003	Stocksbridge Park Steels		
2004–2005	Buxton		
Total		470	(130)

Managerial career
- 2002–2003: Stocksbridge Park Steels
- * Club domestic league appearances and goals

Wayne Biggins (born 20 November 1961) is an English former professional footballer born in Sheffield who made more than 450 appearances in the Football League and also played in the Scottish Football League. He was a striker and was nicknamed "Bertie" throughout his career.

== Playing career ==
Biggins was a latecomer to league football, for although he began his career with Lincoln City he played just eight games for them before he was released. He then played non-league football for Matlock Town and King's Lynn while working as a hod carrier. Biggins found a way back into league football with Burnley, who signed Biggins from Matlock for a nominal fee in February 1984. He scored four goals in his first four appearances for the Lancashire club, including a hat-trick against his former side Lincoln. He was an ever-present for Burnley during the 1984–85 season but despite scoring 21 goals in all competitions he could not prevent the team being relegated to the Fourth Division for the first time in the club's history. Biggins scored four goals in twelve matches at the start of the following campaign and his form attracted the attention of Norwich City, whose manager Ken Brown signed him in October 1985 for a transfer fee of £35,000.

Norwich were re-building their squad after relegation from the first division and were looking to bounce back to the top flight at the first attempt. They succeeded, and Biggins ended the season with a second division championship medal. He stayed at Carrow Road until the summer of 1988 when Manchester City's new manager Mel Machin – who had until that summer been Brown's assistant at Norwich – took him to Maine Road. He scored 9 goals in 32 games for Manchester City before moving to Stoke City in August 1989 for a fee of £250,000. He was a number of expensive signings made by manager Mick Mills in the summer of 1989 as Stoke looked to gain promotion. However results were very poor and cost Mills his job and the new manager Alan Ball failed to stop Stoke's slide and they ended up being relegated to the Third Division, Biggins top-scored in 1989–90 with 11 goals. In 1990–91 Biggins was again leading goalscorer with 12 before enjoying his most prolific season in his career in 1991–92. He scored 28 goals as Stoke lost in the play-offs to Stockport County, although they did beat County in the 1992 Football League Trophy Final.

Not long into the 1992–93 season, Biggins left to join Barnsley where he spent a year before joining up with Lou Macari at Celtic. Biggins endured a poor three-month spell at Celtic Park and returned to Stoke for £125,000 on transfer deadline day in March 1994, before playing out his league career with Luton Town, Oxford United and Wigan Athletic. He won a Third Division championship medal with Wigan in 1997. He went back into non-league football with Leek Town.

== Management and coaching ==
After leaving Leek Town, Biggins moved to Stocksbridge Park Steels, where he became assistant manager and then manager until November 2003. He later played for and coached Buxton.

== Personal life ==
He is the father of footballer Harrison Biggins. Wayne, his wife, and Harrison all had COVID-19 during the COVID-19 pandemic.

== Career statistics ==
Appearances and goals by club, season and competition
Club	Season	League			FA Cup		League Cup		Other		Total	
Club	Season	Division	Apps	Goals	Apps	Goals	Apps	Goals	Apps	Goals	Apps	Goals
Lincoln City	1980–81	Fourth Division	8	1	0	0	0	0	0	0	8	1
Burnley	1983–84	Third Division	20	8	0	0	0	0	4 (Note: Appearances in Football League Trophy)	3	24	11
Burnley	1984–85	Third Division	46	18	3	1	4	0	3	2	56	21
Burnley	1985–86	Fourth Division	12	3	0	0	2	1	0	0	14	4
Burnley	Total		78	29	3	1	6	1	7	5	94	36
Norwich City	1985–86	Second Division	28	7	1	0	0	0	4 (Note: Appearances in Football League Super Cup)	1	33	7
Norwich City	1986–87	First Division	31	4	3	0	3	1	3 (Note: Appearances in Full Members' Cup)	2	40	7
Norwich City	1987–88	First Division	20	5	0	0	3	1	1	0	24	6
Norwich City	Total		79	16	4	0	6	2	8	3	97	21
Manchester City	1988–89	Second Division	32	9	2	0	4	1	0	0	38	10
Stoke City	1989–90	Second Division	35	10	1	0	0	0	2	1	38	11
Stoke City	1990–91	Third Division	38	12	3	0	4	0	1	0	46	12
Stoke City	1991–92	Third Division	41	22	2	0	4	2	7 (Note: Five appearances and four goals in Football League Trophy and two appearances in Third Division play-offs)	4	54	28
Stoke City	1992–93	Second Division	8	2	0	0	2	2	0	0	10	4
Stoke City	Total		122	46	6	0	10	4	10	5	148	55
Barnsley	1992–93	First Division	34	14	4	0	0	0	0	0	38	14
Barnsley	1993–94	First Division	13	2	0	0	0	0	0	0	13	2
Barnsley	Total		47	16	4	0	0	0	0	0	51	16
Celtic	1993–94	Scottish Premier Division	9	0	1	0	0	0	0	0	10	0
Stoke City	1993–94	First Division	10	4	0	0	0	0	0	0	10	4
Stoke City	1994–95	First Division	17	2	0	0	2	0	4 (Note: Appearances in Anglo-Italian Cup)	2	23	4
Stoke City	Total		27	6	0	0	2	0	4	2	33	8
Luton Town (loan)	1994–95	First Division	7	1	2	1	0	0	0	0	9	2
Oxford United	1995–96	Second Division	10	1	0	0	4	1	1	0	15	2
Wigan Athletic	1995–96	Third Division	18	2	0	0	0	0	0	0	18	2
Wigan Athletic	1996–97	Third Division	33	3	1	0	2	0	1	0	37	3
Wigan Athletic	Total		51	5	1	0	2	0	1	0	55	5
Career total			470	130	23	2	34	9	31	15	558	156

== Honours ==
Norwich City

- Football League Second Division: 1985–86

Stoke City

- Associate Members' Cup: 1991–92

Wigan Athletic

- Football League Third Division: 1996–97

Individual

- PFA Team of the Year: 1990–91 Third Division, 1991–92 Third Division
