= Graham Harbey =

English footballer (born 1964)

Personal information
- Full name: Graham Keith Harbey
- Date of birth: 29 August 1964 (age 62)
- Place of birth: Chesterfield, England
- Height: 5 ft 8 in (1.73 m)
- Position: Left back

Youth career
- 1980–1983: Derby County

Senior career*
Years	Team	Apps	(Gls)
1983–1987	Derby County	40	(1)
1987–1989	Ipswich Town	59	(1)
1990–1992	West Bromwich Albion	97	(2)
1992–1994	Stoke City	19	(0)
–	Gresley Rovers		
Total		215	(4)
- * Club domestic league appearances and goals

Graham Keith Harbey (born 29 August 1964) is an English former footballer who played in the Football League for Derby County, Ipswich Town, Stoke City and West Bromwich Albion.

== Career ==
Harbey was born in Chesterfield and progressed through the youth teams at Derby County and made his debut in 1983–84. He played 21 times for the "Rams" that season as they suffered relegation from the Second Division. In the third tier Harbey most of his time in the reserves and Derby gain promotion in 1985–86. He played 19 times in 1986–87 as back to back promotions were achieved but Harbey deemed surplus to requirements was sold to Ipswich Town. He spent two years at Portman Road making 77 appearances and was sold to West Bromwich Albion in November 1989. He played three seasons for the "Baggies" and was an ever-present in 1991–92 making 53 appearances. He joined Stoke City in the summer of 1992 and made 24 appearances in 1992–93 as Stoke won the third tier title. He was rarely used by manager Lou Macari in 1993–94 and left the club at the end of the season.

== Career statistics ==
Appearances and goals by club, season and competition
Club	Season	League			FA Cup		League Cup		Other^{[A]}		Total	
Club	Season	Division	Apps	Goals	Apps	Goals	Apps	Goals	Apps	Goals	Apps	Goals
Derby County	1983–84	Second Division	19	0	0	0	2	0	0	0	21	0
Derby County	1984–85	Third Division	4	1	0	0	0	0	0	0	4	1
Derby County	1985–86	Third Division	3	0	2	0	0	0	2	0	7	0
Derby County	1986–87	Second Division	14	1	1	0	3	0	1	0	19	1
Derby County	Total		40	1	3	0	5	0	3	0	51	2
Ipswich Town	1987–88	Second Division	35	1	1	0	4	2	4	0	44	3
Ipswich Town	1988–89	Second Division	23	0	1	0	4	0	4	0	32	0
Ipswich Town	1989–90	Second Division	1	0	0	0	0	0	0	0	1	0
Ipswich Town	Total		59	1	2	0	8	2	8	0	77	3
West Bromwich Albion	1989–90	Second Division	35	0	1	0	1	0	1	0	38	0
West Bromwich Albion	1990–91	Second Division	21	1	1	0	2	0	1	0	25	1
West Bromwich Albion	1991–92	Third Division	46	1	2	0	2	0	3	0	53	1
West Bromwich Albion	Total		97	2	4	0	5	0	5	0	116	2
Stoke City	1992–93	Second Division	17	0	0	0	4	0	3	0	24	0
Stoke City	1993–94	First Division	2	0	0	0	0	0	2	0	4	0
Stoke City	Total		19	0	0	0	4	0	5	0	28	0
Career total			215	4	9	0	22	1	21	0	272	7

A. The "Other" column constitutes appearances and goals in the Anglo-Italian Cup, Full Members' Cup, Football League Trophy.

== Honours ==
Derby County

- Football League Second Division: 1986–87
- Football League Third Division third-place promotion: 1985–86

Stoke City

- Football League Second Division: 1992–93
