= 1993–94 Stoke City F.C. season =

Stoke City
1993–94 season
- Chairman: Peter Coates
- Manager: Lou Macari, Joe Jordan
- Stadium: Victoria Ground
- Football League First Division: 10th (67 Points)
- FA Cup: Fourth round
- League Cup: Second round
- Anglo-Italian Cup: Group stage
- Top goalscorer: League: Dave Regis; Toddy Örlygsson (10 each); All: Dave Regis (14 goals)
- Highest home attendance: 22,576 vs Wolverhampton Wanderers (5 February 1994)
- Lowest home attendance: 10,181 vs Peterborough United (13 April 1994)
- Average home league attendance: 15,968
Home colours

The 1993–94 season was Stoke City's 87th season in the Football League and 31st in the second tier, now known as the First Division following the formation of the Premier League.

Stoke, now back in the second tier for the first time since 1990, were now looking to gain promotion back to English football's top tier and with Lou Macari in charge it seemed to be a real possibility. Icelandic international Toddy Örlygsson arrived from Nottingham Forest which signalled the club's intentions but they were rocked in October when manager Macari decided to join boyhood club Celtic and another Scotsman, Joe Jordan was appointed manager. Unlike Macari, Jordan was not a popular person with the supporters due to his lack of passion and style of play. Results were okay and a 10th-place finish was the final outcome.

== Season review ==
=== League ===
In the summer of 1993 brewer Carling was signed up as the new shirt sponsor and in the build-up to the 1993–94 season Macari sought out to strengthen his squad in readiness for a tough looking First Division. In came Icelandic international midfielder Toddy Örlygsson and proven goalscorer Gary Bannister both from Nottingham Forest, Simon Sturridge from Birmingham City, goalkeeper Mark Prudhoe from Darlington and Martin Carruthers from Aston Villa, whilst Micky Gynn and Kenny Lowe arrived on free transfers. Goalkeeper Carl Muggleton came in from Leicester City and Kevin Russell joined Burnley for £120,000.

A good crowd of 18,766 attended the opening match of the season as Stoke fell to a poor 2–1 defeat to Millwall and questions were asked about the quality of Macari's players in the much tougher First Division. And with Stoke failing to find any real form despite a fantastic victory against Manchester United in the League Cup the fans were shocked when star striker Mark Stein, who by October had already scored 13 goals, was allowed to join Chelsea for a club record fee of £1.4 million. Stein had become an idol amongst the supporters and felt let down by the board for accepting Chelsea's offer. Come November and Stoke were struggling in the bottom half of the table and soon after manager Lou Macari left for one of his former club's, Celtic. The new manager was another former Scottish international with a similar career to that of Macari, Joe Jordan. Stoke supporters felt that the appointment of Jordan was the wrong decision with club legend Denis Smith the preferred man to take the position.

They eventually accepted Jordan as the new manager although his style of play soon began to cause grumblings from the terraces but the side slowly got results going if not the quality of football. In early 1994 the club was rocked by news that former manager Tony Waddington had died and thousands of supporters lined the streets on the day of his funeral to pay their respects to Stoke's most successful manager. Stoke huffed and puffed as they tried to claim a play-off place but missed out and finished an eventful season in 10th place.

=== FA Cup ===
After overcoming plucky non-league Bath City in a third round replay, 4–1 at Twerton Park, Stoke lost to Premiership side Oldham Athletic.

=== League Cup ===
Stoke knocked out Mansfield Town which set up a clash with Manchester United. Stoke produced a fantastic first leg performance and won 2–1 thanks to two goals from Stein, but they could not repeat the feat in the second leg and lost 2–0.

== Final league table ==
Pos	Team	Pld	W	D	L	GF	GA	GD	Pts
8	Wolverhampton Wanderers	46	17	17	12	60	47	+13	68
9	Middlesbrough	46	18	13	15	66	54	+12	67
10	Stoke City	46	18	13	15	57	59	−2	67
11	Charlton Athletic	46	19	8	19	61	58	+3	65
12	Sunderland	46	19	8	19	54	57	−3	65

Source: rsssf.com
Rules for classification: 1) Points; 2) Goals scored; 3) Goal difference

== Results ==
=== Legend ===
Win	Draw	Loss

=== Football League First Division ===
Match	Date	Opponent	Venue	Result	Attendance	Scorers
1	14 August 1993	Millwall	H	1–2	18,766	McCarthy 28' (o.g.)
2	21 August 1993	Bolton Wanderers	A	1–1	11,328	Stein 69'
3	28 August 1993	West Bromwich Albion	H	1–0	17,948	Stein 68'
4	4 September 1993	Portsmouth	A	3–3	12,552	Stein (2) 17', 65', Regis 84'
5	11 September 1993	Tranmere Rovers	H	1–2	17,296	Martindale 25' (o.g.)
6	14 September 1993	Middlesbrough	A	2–1	13,189	Carruthers 42', Foley 84'
7	19 September 1993	Nottingham Forest	A	3–2	20,843	Regis 16', Stein (2) 25', 49' (pen)
8	25 September 1993	Southend United	H	0–1	16,145	
9	2 October 1993	Crystal Palace	A	1–4	12,880	Stein 75'
10	10 October 1993	Oxford United	A	0–1	6,489	
11	16 October 1993	Grimsby Town	H	1–0	14,696	Örlygsson 69'
12	23 October 1993	Wolverhampton Wanderers	A	1–1	20,421	Stein 33'
13	30 October 1993	Barnsley	H	5–4	14,674	Fleming 23' (o.g.), Bishop 25' (o.g.), Gleghorn 50', Overson 55', Carruthers 64'
14	3 November 1993	Sunderland	H	1–0	13,551	Örlygsson 86'
15	6 November 1993	Watford	A	3–1	7,767	Örlygsson 10', Carruthers 53', Regis 84'
16	14 November 1993	Leicester City	H	1–0	15,984	Gleghorn 43'
17	20 November 1993	Notts County	A	0–2	9,815	
18	27 November 1993	Luton Town	A	2–6	7,384	Regis 3', Linton (o.g.) 41'
19	4 December 1993	Watford	H	2–0	13,465	Bannister 53', Regis 63'
20	11 December 1993	Middlesbrough	H	3–1	13,777	Bannister 18', Örlygsson (2) 32', 69'
21	19 December 1993	Millwall	A	0–2	8,930	
22	26 December 1993	Birmingham City	H	2–1	16,584	Örlygsson 21', Sandford 69'
23	28 December 1993	Charlton Athletic	A	0–2	8,416	
24	1 January 1994	Derby County	H	2–1	20,307	Foley 35', Örlygsson 49'
25	3 January 1994	Bristol City	A	0–0	11,132	
26	15 January 1994	Grimsby Town	A	0–0	8,577	
27	22 January 1994	Oxford United	H	1–1	14,689	Regis 12'
28	5 February 1994	Wolverhampton Wanderers	H	1–1	22,579	Overson 53'
29	12 February 1994	Barnsley	A	0–3	7,561	
30	19 February 1994	Peterborough United	A	1–1	7,428	Gleghorn 45'
31	23 February 1994	Bolton Wanderers	H	2–0	14,257	Örlygsson 45', Regis 85'
32	26 February 1994	Portsmouth	H	2–0	14,506	Örlygsson 45' (pen), Carruthers 84'
33	5 March 1994	West Bromwich Albion	A	0–0	16,060	
34	12 March 1994	Nottingham Forest	H	0–1	20,550	
35	15 March 1994	Tranmere Rovers	A	0–2	6,346	
36	19 March 1994	Southend United	A	0–0	4,542	
37	26 March 1994	Crystal Palace	H	0–2	18,071	
38	30 March 1994	Bristol City	H	3–0	13,208	Adams (2) 8', 78', Biggins 59' (pen)
39	1 April 1994	Birmingham City	A	1–3	13,568	Carruthers 33'
40	4 April 1994	Charlton Athletic	H	1–0	13,569	Örlygsson 31'
41	9 April 1994	Derby County	A	2–4	16,593	Biggins 77' (pen), Adams 81'
42	13 April 1994	Peterborough United	H	3–0	10,181	Regis 14', Biggins 36', Walters 79'
43	16 April 1994	Sunderland	A	1–0	17,406	Walters 28'
44	23 April 1994	Notts County	H	0–0	16,470	
45	30 April 1994	Leicester City	A	1–1	19,291	Regis 48'
46	8 May 1994	Luton Town	H	2–2	15,911	Biggins 16', Regis 32'

=== FA Cup ===
Round	Date	Opponent	Venue	Result	Attendance	Scorers
R3	8 January 1994	Bath City	H	0–0	14,159	
R3 Replay	18 January 1994	Bath City	A	4–1	6,213	Regis (2) 5', 57', Cranson 38', Örlygsson 83'
R4	29 January 1994	Oldham Athletic	A	0–0	14,465	
R4 Replay	9 February 1994	Oldham Athletic	H	0–1	19,871	

=== League Cup ===
Round	Date	Opponent	Venue	Result	Attendance	Scorers
R1 1st Leg	18 August 1993	Mansfield Town	H	2–2	8,976	Gleghorn 2', Carruthers 80'
R1 2nd Leg	24 August 1993	Mansfield Town	A	3–1 (aet)	4,214	Stein (2) 17', 93', Regis 117'
R2 1st Leg	22 September 1993	Manchester United	H	2–1	23,327	Stein (2) 32', 74'
R2 2nd Leg	6 October 1993	Manchester United	A	0–2	41,387	

=== Anglo-Italian Cup ===
Round	Date	Opponent	Venue	Result	Attendance	Scorers
Qualifying Match 1	31 August 1993	Wolverhampton Wanderers	A	3–3	9,092	Carruthers (2) 23', 38', Gleghorn 68'
Qualifying Match 2	7 September 1993	Birmingham City	H	2–0	8,633	Cranson 4', Stein 51' (pen)
Group Match 1	12 October 1993	Cosenza	H	2–1	5,183	Carruthers 18', Örlygsson 78'
Group Match 2	10 November 1993	Fiorentina	H	0–0	8,616	
Group Match 3	16 November 1993	Padova	A	0–3	1,495	
Group Match 4	22 December 1993	Pescara	A	1–2	1,850	Regis 43'

=== Friendlies ===
Match	Opponent	Venue	Result
1	Simba SC	A	3–1
2	Pamba	A	2–1
3	Young Africans	A	4–0
4	Tanzamia Breweries	A	3–2
5	Real Sociedad	H	2–0
6	Newcastle Town	A	4–0
7	Telford United	A	11–1
8	Northwich Victoria	A	1–1

== Squad statistics ==
Pos.	Name	League		FA Cup		League Cup		Anglo-Italian Cup		Total	
Pos.	Name	Apps	Goals	Apps	Goals	Apps	Goals	Apps	Goals	Apps	Goals
GK	(Scotland) Gordon Marshall	10	0	2	0	0	0	1	0	13	0
GK	(England) Carl Muggleton	6	0	0	0	1	0	2	0	9	0
GK	(England) Mark Prudhoe	30	0	2	0	3	0	3	0	38	0
DF	(England) John Butler	34(1)	0	4	0	2	0	5	0	45(1)	0
DF	(Scotland) John Clark	12	0	0	0	0	0	0	0	12	0
DF	(England) Ian Clarkson	14	0	1	0	2	0	1(1)	0	18(1)	0
DF	(Scotland) Tom Cowan	14	0	0	0	1	0	3	0	18	0
DF	(England) Ian Cranson	44	0	4	1	3	0	6	1	57	2
DF	(England) Graham Harbey	2	0	0	0	0	0	2	0	4	0
DF	(England) Graham Potter	2(1)	0	2	0	0	0	0	0	4(1)	0
DF	(England) Vince Overson	39	2	4	0	4	0	5	0	52	2
DF	(England) Lee Sandford	41(1)	1	4	0	3	0	5	0	53(1)	1
MF	(England) Micky Adams	10	3	0	0	0	0	0	0	10	3
MF	(England) Steve Foley	42(1)	2	4	0	4	0	3	0	53(1)	2
MF	(England) Nigel Gleghorn	38(2)	3	4	0	4	1	6	1	52(2)	5
MF	(England) Micky Gynn	14(7)	0	0	0	2(2)	0	3(1)	0	19(10)	0
MF	(Scotland) Dave Kevan	1	0	0	0	1	0	0(1)	0	2(1)	0
MF	(England) Kenny Lowe	3(6)	0	0	0	2	0	2	0	7(6)	0
MF	(Iceland) Toddy Orlygsson	42(3)	10	4	1	4	0	5	1	55(3)	12
MF	(England) Paul Ware	1	0	0	0	0	0	0	0	1	0
MF	(England) Brett Williams	2	0	0	0	0	0	0	0	2	0
MF	(England) Simon Winstone	0	0	0	0	0	0	0	0	0	0
FW	(England) Gary Bannister	10(5)	2	2	0	0	0	0(1)	0	12(6)	2
FW	(England) Wayne Biggins	10	4	0	0	0	0	0	0	10	4
FW	(England) Martin Carruthers	24(10)	5	2	0	1(2)	1	4(1)	3	31(13)	9
FW	(England) Tony Kelly	0	0	0	0	0	0	0(1)	0	0(1)	0
FW	(England) Dave Regis	33(5)	10	4	2	2	1	4	1	43(5)	14
FW	(England) Graham Shaw	2(2)	0	0(1)	0	0	0	0(1)	0	2(4)	0
FW	(England) Mark Stein	12	8	0	0	4	4	3	1	19	13
FW	(England) Simon Sturridge	5(8)	0	1(1)	0	1	0	2(2)	0	9(11)	0
FW	(England) Mark Walters	9	2	0	0	0	0	0	0	9	2
–	Own goals	–	5	–	0	–	0	–	0	–	5
