= Jason Percival =

English footballer

Personal information
- Full name: Jason Charles Percival
- Date of birth: 20 September 1973 (age 53)
- Place of birth: Nuneaton, England
- Position: Forward

Senior career*
Years	Team	Apps	(Gls)
1990–1993	Stoke City	0	(0)
1993–1994	Exeter City	4	(0)
1994–1995	Nuneaton Borough	46	(21)
1995–1996	Hinckley Town	49	(15)
1996–1997	Atherstone United	10	(4)
1997–1998	Evesham United	41	(19)
1998–1999	Racing Club Warwick	28	(8)
1999	Stratford Town	11	(11)
2000	VS Rugby	4	(0)
2000	Downes Sports	2	(4)
2000–2004	Barwell		
Total		193	(83)
- * Club domestic league appearances and goals

Jason Charles Percival (born 20 September 1973) is an English former professional footballer who played in the Football League for Exeter City.

== Career ==
Percival was born in Nuneaton and began his career with Stoke City. He failed to break into the first team at Stoke and joined Second Division side Exeter City in 1993 where he made four appearances. He went on to play for non-league sides Nuneaton Borough, Hinckley Town, Atherstone United, Evesham United and finished his career with Barwell.

== Career statistics ==
Appearances and goals by club, season and competition
Club	Season	League			FA Cup		League Cup		Other		Total	
Club	Season	Division	Apps	Goals	Apps	Goals	Apps	Goals	Apps	Goals	Apps	Goals
Stoke City	1991–92	Second Division	0	0	0	0	0	0	0	0	0	0
Exeter City	1993–94	Second Division	4	0	0	0	0	0	0	0	4	0
Career total			4	0	0	0	0	0	0	0	4	0
