= Marcus Jones (footballer) =

English footballer (born 1974)

Personal information
- Full name: Marcus Jones
- Date of birth: 24 June 1974 (age 52)
- Place of birth: Stone, England
- Position: Defender

Senior career*
Years	Team	Apps	(Gls)
1991–1992	Stoke Ciy	0	(0)
1992–1993	Stafford Rangers		
1993–1994	Chasetown		
1994–1995	Bolehall Swifts		
1995–1996	Willenhall Town		
1996–1997	Hinckley Athletic		
1997	Kingstonian		
1997	VS Rugby		
1997–1999	Telford United		
1999–2000	Scarborough	52	(1)
2000–2001	Cheltenham Town	2	(0)
2001	Yeovil Town	12	(0)
2001	Northwich Victoria	11	(1)
2001–2002	Scarborough	7	(0)
- * Club domestic league appearances and goals

Marcus Jones (born 24 June 1974) is an English former footballer who played as a defender in the Football League. He made only two Football League appearance for Cheltenham Town He had spent the vast majority of his career in non league football with teams like Yeovil Town, Northwich Victoria, Scarborough and Telford United.

== Playing career ==
Born in Stone, Staffordshire, Jones began his career at Stoke City, before embarking on a non league career with teams such as Chasetown, Bolehall Swifts, Willenhall Town, Hinckley Athletic, VS Rugby, Stafford Rangers, Telford United, Scarborough.

He made a surprise move to Cheltenham Town in November 2000 due to an injury crisis at Whaddon Road. He made his debut in an LDV Trophy match against Southend United and his first Football League appearance vs Scunthorpe United as a sub. His first and only other start for the club was against Torquay United on 6 January 2001. He left soon after and joined Yeovil Town, making his debut on 17 February 2001 against Boston United.

After leaving Yeovil Town he went back north this time to Northwich Victoria where he was team captain.

He later returned to the Scarborough area and turned out for local team Eastfield as well as playing local Sunday football for teams like Strongwood and Star, before being appointed player coach at Scarborough Town in 2008.

== Career statistics ==
Club	Season	League			FA Cup		League Cup		Other		Total	
Club	Season	Division	Apps	Goals	Apps	Goals	Apps	Goals	Apps	Goals	Apps	Goals
Stoke City	1992–93	Second Division	0	0	0	0	0	0	0	0	0	0
Scarborough	1999–2000	Football Conference	36	1	0	0	0	0	2	0	38	1
Scarborough	2000–01	Football Conference	16	0	0	0	0	0	0	0	16	0
Scarborough	Total		52	1	0	0	0	0	2	0	54	1
Cheltenham Town	2000–01	Third Division	2	0	0	0	0	0	1	0	3	0
Yeovil Town	2000–01	Football Conference	12	0	0	0	0	0	0	0	12	0
Northwich Victoria	2001–02	Football Conference	11	1	0	0	0	0	0	0	11	1
Scarborough	2001–02	Football Conference	7	0	0	0	0	0	1	0	8	0
Career total			84	2	0	0	0	0	4	0	88	2
