= Tim Steele (footballer) =

English footballer (born 1967)

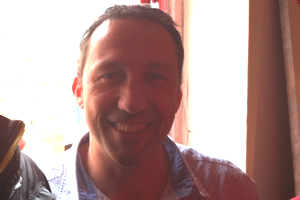
- Steele in 2011

Personal information
- Full name: Timothy Wesley Steele
- Date of birth: 1 December 1967 (age 58)
- Place of birth: Coventry, England
- Height: 5 ft 9 in (1.75 m)
- Position: Midfielder

Senior career*
Years	Team	Apps	(Gls)
1985–1989	Shrewsbury Town	61	(5)
1989–1993	Wolverhampton Wanderers	75	(7)
1992	→ Stoke City (loan)	7	(1)
1993–1994	Bradford City	11	(0)
1994–1996	Hereford United	32	(2)
1996–1997	Exeter City	24	(3)
1997–2001	Tamworth		
2001–200?	Sutton Coldfield Town		
Total		210	(18)

Managerial career
- 2001: Tamworth (caretaker manager)
- * Club domestic league appearances and goals

Timothy Wesley Steele (born 1 December 1967) is an English former professional footballer who played as a midfielder for Bradford City, Exeter City, Hereford United, Shrewsbury Town, Stoke City and Wolverhampton Wanderers.

Steele began his career with Shrewsbury Town where he spent four years before moving to Wolverhampton Wanderers. He helped Wolves gain promotion in 1988–89 before he lost his place in the side to Andy Thompson. He joined Stoke City on loan in 1991–92 before leaving for Bradford City permanently in the summer of 1993. He then played for Hereford United and Exeter City.

== Career ==
Steele was born in Coventry and started his playing career with Shrewsbury Town making his debut as a substitute at home to Fulham during the 1985–86 season he played eleven times in 1986–87 scoring once and then scored 4 goals in 37 matches in 1987–88 as the "Shrews" continued to avoid relegation. However they began the 1988–89 terribly and were well on their way to relegation. He left Shrewsbury in February 1989 in favour of a move to Wolverhampton Wanderers and under the management of Graham Turner Wolves won the Third Division title in 1988–89. Steele played in 15 matches in 1989–90 and 32 matches in 1990–91 but saw his place taken by Andy Thompson in December 1991. He joined Third Division Stoke City on loan in February 1992 and played seven matches for the "Potters" during the 1991–92 season scoring once in his final match against Exeter City. He was rarely used by Wolves in 1992–93 making just four appearances and was released at the end of the season.

He joined Bradford City with whom he played 14 times scoring once before signing for Hereford United in January 1994. He spent two and a half years at Edgar Street making 28 appearances scoring twice and ended his career with a season at Exeter City where he played 25 times scoring three goals.

In July 1997, Steele joined non-league side Tamworth. In an eventful five years with The Lambs, Steele briefly managed the team after the departure of Paul Hendrie, and even played a game in goal after goalkeeper Darren Acton was sent off for handling the ball outside of his area, Steele went on to keep a clean sheet. At the end of the 2000–01 season, Steele was released by Tamworth and went on to play for Sutton Coldfield Town, he has since retired.

== Career statistics ==
Appearances and goals by club, season and competition
Club	Season	League			FA Cup		League Cup		Other (Note: Includes Full Members Cup and Football League Trophy.)		Total	
Club	Season	Division	Apps	Goals	Apps	Goals	Apps	Goals	Apps	Goals	Apps	Goals
Shrewsbury Town	1985–86	Second Division	2	0	0	0	0	0	0	0	2	0
Shrewsbury Town	1986–87	Second Division	11	1	0	0	0	0	0	0	11	1
Shrewsbury Town	1987–88	Second Division	33	3	0	0	3	1	1	0	37	4
Shrewsbury Town	1988–89	Second Division	15	1	0	0	1	0	1	0	17	1
Shrewsbury Town	Total		61	5	0	0	4	1	2	0	67	6
Wolverhampton Wanderers	1988–89	Third Division	11	1	0	0	0	0	2	0	13	1
Wolverhampton Wanderers	1989–90	Second Division	15	1	0	0	0	0	0	0	15	1
Wolverhampton Wanderers	1990–91	Second Division	28	1	1	0	2	1	2	0	32	2
Wolverhampton Wanderers	1991–92	Second Division	17	3	1	0	3	1	0	0	21	4
Wolverhampton Wanderers	1992–93	First Division	4	0	0	0	0	0	0	0	4	0
Wolverhampton Wanderers	Total		75	7	1	0	5	2	2	0	85	8
Stoke City (loan)	1991–92	Third Division	7	1	0	0	0	0	0	0	7	1
Bradford City	1993–94	Second Division	11	0	0	0	3	1	0	0	14	1
Hereford United	1993–94	Third Division	20	2	0	0	0	0	0	0	20	2
Hereford United	1994–95	Third Division	5	0	1	0	2	0	1	0	9	0
Hereford United	1995–96	Third Division	7	0	1	0	0	0	2	0	10	0
Hereford United	Total		32	2	2	0	2	0	3	0	28	2
Exeter City	1996–97	Third Division	24	3	0	0	0	0	1	0	25	3
Career total			210	18	3	0	14	4	8	0	235	22

== Honours ==
Wolverhampton Wanderers

- Football League Third Division: 1988–89
