= Gary Pick =

English footballer

Personal information
- Full name: Gary Mark Pick
- Date of birth: 15 December 1966 (age 59)
- Place of birth: Leicester, England
- Position: Midfielder

Senior career*
Years	Team	Apps	(Gls)
1991–1992	Leicester United		
1992–1993	Stoke City	0	(0)
1994–1996	Hereford United	43	(2)
1996	Cambridge United	4	(0)
1996–1997	Newport County		
1997	Kettering Town		
1998	Worcester City		
Total		47	(2)
- * Club domestic league appearances and goals

Gary Mark Pick (born 9 July 1971) is an English former professional footballer who played in the Football League for Cambridge United and Hereford United.

== Career ==
Pick was born in Leicester and began his career with Stoke City having joined from non-league Leicester United. He failed to break into the first team at Stoke and joined Third Division side Hereford United in 1994 where he made 56 appearances over two season at Edgar Street. He went on to play Cambridge United and non-league sides Newport County, Kettering Town and Worcester City.

== Career statistics ==
Appearances and goals by club, season and competition
Club	Season	League			FA Cup		League Cup		Other		Total	
Club	Season	Division	Apps	Goals	Apps	Goals	Apps	Goals	Apps	Goals	Apps	Goals
Stoke City	1992–93	Second Division	0	0	0	0	0	0	0	0	0	0
Hereford United	1994–95	Third Division	29	2	2	1	4	0	3	0	38	3
Hereford United	1995–96	Third Division	14	0	1	0	1	0	2	0	18	0
Hereford United	Total		43	2	2	1	5	0	5	0	56	3
Cambridge United	1995–96	Third Division	4	0	0	0	0	0	0	0	4	0
Career total			47	2	3	1	5	0	5	0	60	3
