= Jimmy Mulligan (footballer, born 1974) =

English football defender

Personal information
- Full name: James Mulligan
- Date of birth: 21 April 1974 (age 52)
- Place of birth: Dublin, Ireland
- Position: Forward

Senior career*
Years	Team	Apps	(Gls)
1990–1992	St Joseph's Sallynoggin		
1992–1994	Stoke City	0	(0)
1992	→ Telford United (loan)		
1992	→ Macclesfield Town (loan)		
1993	→ Bury (loan)	3	(1)
1994	→ Northwich Victoria (loan)		
1994–1995	Bury	17	(2)
1995–1997	Sligo Rovers		
1998–2000	Finn Harps		
2000–2002	Cork City		
- * Club domestic league appearances and goals

James Mulligan (born 21 April 1974) is an Irish former footballer who played in the Football League for Bury.

== Career ==
Mulligan was born in Dublin and began his career with Stoke City having joined from St Joseph's Sallynoggin. He failed to break into the first team at Stoke and spent time out on loan at Telford United, Macclesfield Town, Northwich Victoria and Bury who he joined permanently in 1994. He played 17 league matches for the Shakers, scoring twice before returning to Ireland with Sligo Rovers, Finn Harps and Cork City.

== Career statistics ==
Club	Season	League			FA Cup		League Cup		Other		Total	
Club	Season	Division	Apps	Goals	Apps	Goals	Apps	Goals	Apps	Goals	Apps	Goals
Stoke City	1992–93	Second Division	0	0	0	0	0	0	0	0	0	0
Bury	1993–94	Third Division	3	1	0	0	0	0	1	0	4	1
Bury	1994–95	Third Division	15	2	2	0	2	0	2	0	21	2
Bury	1995–96	Third Division	2	0	0	0	0	0	0	0	2	0
Career total			20	3	2	0	2	0	3	0	27	3
