= Simon Winstone (footballer) =

English footballer and manager

Personal information
- Full name: Simon John Winstone
- Date of birth: 4 October 1974 (age 52)
- Place of birth: Bristol, England
- Position: Midfielder

Senior career*
| Years | Team | Apps | (Gls) |
| 1991–1993 | Stoke City | 0 | (0) |
| 1994–1995 | Torquay United | 2 | (0) |
| 1994–1995 | Telford United | | |
| 1995 | Mangotsfield United | | |
| 1995 | Clevedon Town | | |
| 1996–1997 | Mangotsfield United | | |
| 1997–1998 | Paulton Rovers | | |
| 1998 | Yeovil Town | 4 | (0) |

Managerial career
- 2011–2013: Malmesbury Victoria
- * Club domestic league appearances and goals

Simon John Winstone (born 4 October 1974) is an English former footballer who played for Stoke City and Torquay United. He later managed Malmesbury Victoria.

== Career ==
Winstone was born in Bristol and began his career with Stoke City. He was made captain of the club's reserve team but failed to earn a professional contract at the Victoria Ground and left for Torquay United. He made just two appearances for Torquay before leaving. In November 2011 he was appointed manager at Hellenic League side Malmesbury Victoria. He resigned as Malmesbury manager in April 2013.

== Career statistics ==
| Club | Season | League | | | FA Cup | | League Cup | | Total | |
| Club | Season | Division | Apps | Goals | Apps | Goals | Apps | Goals | Apps | Goals |
|---|---|---|---|---|---|---|---|---|---|---|
| Stoke City | 1993–94 | First Division | 0 | 0 | 0 | 0 | 0 | 0 | 0 | 0 |
| Torquay United | 1994–95 | Third Division | 2 | 0 | 0 | 0 | 0 | 0 | 2 | 0 |
| Career total | | | 2 | 0 | 0 | 0 | 0 | 0 | 2 | 0 |
