= Kevin Russell (footballer) =

English footballer & manager (born 1966)

Personal information
- Full name: Kevin John Russell
- Date of birth: 6 December 1966 (age 59)
- Place of birth: Portsmouth, England
- Position: Striker

Youth career
- 1982–1984: Brighton & Hove Albion

Senior career*
Years	Team	Apps	(Gls)
1982–1984	Brighton & Hove Albion	0	(0)
1984–1987	Portsmouth	4	(0)
1987–1989	Wrexham	84	(43)
1989–1992	Leicester City	43	(10)
1990	→ Peterborough United (loan)	7	(3)
1991	→ Cardiff City (loan)	3	(0)
1991	→ Hereford United (loan)	3	(1)
1992	→ Stoke City (loan)	5	(1)
1992–1993	Stoke City	40	(5)
1993–1994	Burnley	28	(6)
1994–1995	AFC Bournemouth	30	(1)
1995	Notts County	11	(0)
1995–2002	Wrexham	198	(17)
Total		456	(87)

International career
1984–1985	England U18	6	(2)

Managerial career
- 2018–2023: Stoke City U21
- 2023: Cheltenham Town (Caretaker)
- * Club domestic league appearances and goals

Kevin John Russell (born 6 December 1966) is an English former professional footballer who played as a striker for Brighton & Hove Albion, Portsmouth, Wrexham, Leicester City, Peterborough United, Cardiff City, Hereford United, Stoke City, Burnley, AFC Bournemouth and Notts County.

== Playing career ==
Russell was a professional footballer and former England Youth international. During a career spanning twenty years he played for eleven clubs. Due to his quiff hairstyle Russell was nicknamed "Rooster" early on in his career; ironically he would lose all his hair in his youth and was bald for much of his playing days. Released by Brighton after an apprenticeship Russell returned to his hometown club Portsmouth but appearances were limited He then moved on to Wrexham during the 1987 close season. In the first of his two spells with the club he scored at a rate of just over a goal every two games. In 1989, he joined Leicester City, but was loaned out four times. However, he fought his way into the first team at the end of the 1991–92 season and became a cult-hero, scoring several important late goals after coming off the bench as he helped fire Leicester to the play-off final, eventually losing to Blackburn Rovers. Despite this, he went to Stoke City at the end of the season. While at Stoke he became a key member of the first team as Stoke won the Second Division title in 1992–93.

After one season at Stoke City, he moved onto Burnley for a fee of £130,000. Short spells with AFC Bournemouth and Notts County followed before a move back to the Racecourse Ground. Here, at last, Russell found a permanent home – he was to play nearly 200 more league games for The Robins in a deeper role, eventually being rewarded with a testimonial against Manchester United. In his second spell at Wrexham, he was best remembered for his winning goal against West Ham in an FA Cup third round replay in the 1996–97 season. With the tie goalless, Russell scored a 90th-minute goal to dump West Ham out of the cup at Upton Park.

== Coaching career ==
He remained at Wrexham as a coach until being sacked in January 2007. On 12 January 2011, he agreed to rejoin Peterborough United, with Darren Ferguson for a second spell. On 18 August 2014, it was confirmed that he rejoined Stoke City as a coach for the Under 21 and Under 18 sides. He was promoted to Stoke City U23s manager for the 2018–19 season. He left his role with Stoke's under-21s in May 2023.

Russell joined Cheltenham Town as assistant manager to Wade Elliott in July 2023. Elliott was sacked in September 2023 and Russell took temporary charge until superseded by Darrell Clarke with effect from 2 October 2023. Eight days later his departure from the club by mutual consent was announced. He then joined Huddersfield Town in January 2025, leaving in May 2025. He then made a return to Peterborough United from June 2025 to October 2025.

== Career statistics ==
Appearances and goals by club, season and competition
Club	Season	League			FA Cup		League Cup		Other^{[A]}		Total	
Club	Season	Division	Apps	Goals	Apps	Goals	Apps	Goals	Apps	Goals	Apps	Goals
Portsmouth	1985–86	Second Division	1	0	0	0	0	0	1	0	2	0
Portsmouth	1986–87	Second Division	3	0	1	0	1	0	1	0	6	0
Portsmouth	Total		4	0	1	0	1	0	2	0	8	0
Wrexham	1987–88	Fourth Division	38	21	2	0	2	1	0	0	42	22
Wrexham	1988–89	Fourth Division	46	22	2	0	2	0	10	3	60	25
Wrexham	Total		84	43	4	0	4	1	10	3	102	47
Leicester City	1989–90	Second Division	10	0	1	0	0	0	0	0	11	0
Leicester City	1990–91	Second Division	13	5	0	0	0	0	0	0	13	5
Leicester City	1991–92	Second Division	20	5	0	0	1	0	5	2	26	7
Leicester City	Total		43	10	1	0	1	0	5	2	50	12
Peterborough United (loan)	1990–91	Fourth Division	7	3	0	0	0	0	0	0	7	3
Cardiff City (loan)	1990–91	Fourth Division	3	0	0	0	0	0	0	0	3	0
Hereford United (loan)	1991–92	Fourth Division	3	1	0	0	0	0	1	1	4	1
Stoke City (loan)	1991–92	Third Division	5	1	0	0	0	0	0	0	5	1
Stoke City	1992–93	Second Division	40	5	2	0	3	0	5	1	50	6
Stoke City	Total		45	6	2	0	3	0	5	1	55	7
Burnley	1993–94	Second Division	28	6	4	0	4	1	1	1	37	8
AFC Bournemouth	1993–94	Second Division	17	1	0	0	0	0	0	0	17	1
AFC Bournemouth	1994–95	Second Division	13	0	2	1	3	1	0	0	18	2
AFC Bournemouth	Total		30	1	2	1	3	1	0	0	35	3
Notts County	1994–95	First Division	11	0	0	0	0	0	0	0	11	0
Wrexham	1995–96	Second Division	40	7	3	0	2	1	2	0	47	8
Wrexham	1996–97	Second Division	41	0	7	3	1	0	1	0	50	3
Wrexham	1997–98	Second Division	16	0	2	0	1	0	0	0	19	0
Wrexham	1998–99	Second Division	31	2	5	1	2	0	6	0	44	3
Wrexham	1999–2000	Second Division	33	4	5	0	1	0	0	0	39	4
Wrexham	2000–01	Second Division	26	4	1	0	0	0	1	0	28	4
Wrexham	2001–02	Second Division	10	0	0	0	1	1	1	0	12	1
Wrexham	2002–03	Third Division	1	0	0	0	0	0	0	0	1	0
Wrexham	Total		198	17	23	4	8	2	11	0	240	23
Career total			456	87	37	5	24	5	35	8	552	105

A. The "Other" column constitutes appearances and goals in the Football League Trophy, Football League play-offs and Full Members Cup.

== Honours ==
Stoke City

- Football League Second Division: 1992–93

Individual

- PFA Team of the Year: 1988–89 Fourth Division
