= Mark Stein (footballer) =

South African footballer (born 1966)

Personal information
- Full name: Earl Mark Sean Stein
- Date of birth: 29 January 1966 (age 60)
- Place of birth: Cape Town, South Africa
- Position: Striker

Senior career*
Years	Team	Apps	(Gls)
1984–1988	Luton Town	54	(19)
1986	→ Aldershot (loan)	2	(1)
1988–1989	Queens Park Rangers	33	(4)
1989–1991	Oxford United	82	(18)
1991	→ Stoke City (loan)	5	(0)
1991–1993	Stoke City	89	(50)
1993–1998	Chelsea	50	(21)
1996–1997	→ Stoke City (loan)	11	(4)
1997	→ Ipswich Town (loan)	7	(2)
1998	→ AFC Bournemouth (loan)	11	(4)
1998–2000	AFC Bournemouth	79	(26)
2000–2001	Luton Town	30	(3)
2001–2003	Dagenham & Redbridge	73	(48)
2004	Waltham Forest	7	(3)
Total		533	(203)

International career
1983	England Youth	1	(0)
1985	England U20	2	(0)
- * Club domestic league appearances and goals

Earl Mark Sean Stein (born 29 January 1966) is a South African-born English former professional footballer and physiotherapist.

As a player, he was a striker from 1984 until 2004, notably in the Premier League for Chelsea and the Football League for Luton Town, Aldershot, Queens Park Rangers, Oxford United, Stoke City, Ipswich Town and AFC Bournemouth before finishing his career in Non-league with Dagenham & Redbridge and Waltham Forest.

Following his retirement, Stein became a sports physiotherapist and has held the role of first team physio at Barnet, Crawley Town and Rotherham United.

== Playing career ==
Stein was born in Cape Town and moved with his family to London in the 1970s. Both his brothers Brian and Edwin plus Mark decided to become professional footballers, with Mark joining Luton Town in 1983. He turned professional in January 1984 and earned three caps with the England under-19 team but he was unable to live up to the heights expected of him at Kenilworth Road and had a short loan spell at Aldershot. In 1987–88, he helped Luton win their first major trophy as they achieved a shock 3–2 over Arsenal in the 1988 Football League Cup final, with Stein coming on as a substitute.

In June 1988 he moved on to Queens Park Rangers where he spent the 1988–89 season scoring seven goals in 42 appearances. He signed for Oxford United in September 1989 after failing out of favour at Loftus Road. After two seasons with Oxford Stein found himself out of the side and playing in the reserves. He joined Stoke City on loan in September 1991 and played five matches without scoring. But he impressed manager Lou Macari with his contribution so much that he persuaded the board to pay £100,000 for his services. It proved to be a sound piece of business as Stein went on a fine run, scoring 22 goals in 1991–92 helping Stoke reach the play-offs where they lost to Stockport County although they did beat County in the 1992 Football League Trophy final with Stein scoring the game's only goal. Stoke fans named Stein "The Golden One" and he went on to top-score in 1992–93 as Stoke won the Second Division title, with Stein scoring 33 goals in 57 matches. In 1993–94 Stein hit the headlines after scoring twice past Manchester United in the League Cup. After Macari moved to Celtic Stein also left the Victoria Ground moving to Premier League Chelsea for a fee of £1.5 million.

Whilst at Chelsea, Stein set a Premier League record by scoring in seven consecutive matches from December 1993 to February 1994. The record stood until 2002, when Ruud van Nistelrooy surpassed it. Stein also played in the 1994 FA Cup final and, in total, he scored 25 goals in 63 games for the West London club, but by the 1996–97 season, he had lost his place in the first team due to the arrival of new strikers Mark Hughes, Gianluca Vialli and Gianfranco Zola. He returned to Stoke on a short-term loan, scoring four goals in 11 games in 1996–97, the club's final season at the Victoria Ground. He finally left Chelsea in the summer of 1998 when he signed for AFC Bournemouth after a loan spell.

His spell at Dagenham & Redbridge, in the Conference from 2001 to 2003, was notable for its ending, as Stein resigned over the club's refusal to investigate allegations of racist comments made by Daggers manager Garry Hill against Fitzroy Simpson. Mark cited his father's work as a South African anti-apartheid activist as inspiration for this; "My Dad was a political activist who fought against racism in South Africa all his life. So why should I have to put up with it here?" Stein ended his career playing for Isthmian League Division One North club Waltham Forest, scoring three goals in seven appearances in the 2003–04 season.

== Physiotherapist ==
On 28 June 2007, Stein was appointed the new physiotherapist at Barnet after taking on a temporary role at the end of the 2006–07 season. On 22 September 2010, he took up a full-time role as physiotherapist at Crawley Town.

== Personal life ==
He is the younger brother of former Luton Town striker Brian Stein; another brother, Ed Stein, played for Barnet. The Stein brothers were born in South Africa, and arrived in the United Kingdom in 1968 when their father Isaiah Stein, an activist with the African National Congress and former boxer, fled the country to escape police persecution and torture for his political activities. Isaiah continued his activism in Britain, serving as a member of the South African Non-Racial Olympic Committee. On 12 July 2008 he played for the England XI in the Gordon Banks Charity Match at the Britannia Stadium.

== Career statistics ==
Appearances and goals by club, season and competition
Club	Season	League			FA Cup		League Cup		Other		Total	
Club	Season	Division	Apps	Goals	Apps	Goals	Apps	Goals	Apps	Goals	Apps	Goals
Luton Town	1983–84	First Division	1	0	0	0	0	0	0	0	1	0
Luton Town	1984–85	First Division	1	0	0	0	0	0	0	0	1	0
Luton Town	1985–86	First Division	6	0	3	2	0	0	0	0	9	2
Luton Town	1986–87	First Division	21	8	0	0	0	0	0	0	21	8
Luton Town	1987–88	First Division	25	11	6	1	4	0	4 (Note: Appearances in Full Members' Cup)	1	39	13
Luton Town	Total		54	19	9	3	4	0	4	1	71	23
Aldershot (loan)	1985–86	Fourth Division	2	1	0	0	0	0	0	0	2	1
Queens Park Rangers	1988–89	First Division	31	4	3	1	4	2	4 (Note: Three appearances in Full Members' Cup and one appearance in Football League Centenary Trophy)	0	42	7
Queens Park Rangers	1989–90	First Division	2	0	0	0	0	0	0	0	2	0
Queens Park Rangers	Total		33	4	3	1	4	2	4	0	44	7
Oxford United	1989–90	Second Division	41	9	2	0	0	0	1	0	44	9
Oxford United	1990–91	Second Division	34	8	1	0	4	0	2	0	41	8
Oxford United	1991–92	Second Division	7	0	0	0	0	0	0	0	7	0
Oxford United	Total		82	18	3	0	4	0	3	0	92	18
Stoke City	1991–92	Third Division	36	16	2	0	0	0	9 (Note: Seven appearances and five goals in Football League Trophy and two appearances and one goal in Third Division play-offs)	6	47	22
Stoke City	1992–93	Second Division	46	26	2	0	4	4	5 (Note: Appearances in Football League Trophy)	3	57	33
Stoke City	1993–94	First Division	12	8	0	0	4	4	3 (Note: Appearances in Anglo-Italian Cup)	1	19	13
Stoke City	Total		94	50	4	0	8	8	17	10	123	68
Chelsea	1993–94	Premier League	18	13	6	1	0	0	0	0	24	14
Chelsea	1994–95	Premier League	24	8	3	1	0	0	3 (Note: Appearances in UEFA Cup Winners' Cup)	2	30	11
Chelsea	1995–96	Premier League	8	0	0	0	1	0	0	0	9	0
Chelsea	1996–97	Premier League	0	0	0	0	0	0	0	0	0	0
Chelsea	1997–98	Premier League	0	0	0	0	0	0	0	0	0	0
Chelsea	Total		50	21	9	2	1	0	3	2	63	25
Stoke City (loan)	1996–97	First Division	11	4	0	0	0	0	0	0	11	4
Ipswich Town (loan)	1997–98	First Division	7	2	0	0	4	1	0	0	11	3
AFC Bournemouth	1997–98	Second Division	11	4	0	0	0	0	3	0	14	4
AFC Bournemouth	1998–99	Second Division	43	15	4	1	5	5	3	4	56	25
AFC Bournemouth	1999–2000	Second Division	36	11	3	1	5	2	2	1	46	15
AFC Bournemouth	Total		90	30	7	2	10	7	8	5	116	44
Luton Town	2000–01	Second Division	30	3	2	0	3	1	1	0	36	4
Dagenham & Redbridge	2001–02	Football Conference	34	24	3	1	0	0	1	0	38	25
Dagenham & Redbridge	2002–03	Football Conference	33	19	2	0	0	0	0	0	35	19
Dagenham & Redbridge	2003–04	Football Conference	6	5	0	0	0	0	0	0	6	5
Dagenham & Redbridge	Total		73	48	5	1	0	0	1	0	79	49
Career total			526	200	42	9	38	19	41	18	648	246

== Honours ==
Luton Town

- Football League Cup: 1987–88
- Full Members' Cup runner-up: 1987–88

Stoke City

- Football League Second Division: 1992–93
- Associate Members' Cup: 1991–92

Chelsea

- FA Cup runner-up: 1993–94

Bournemouth

- Football League Trophy runner-up: 1997–98

Individual

- PFA Team of the Year: 1992–93 Second Division, 1998–99 Second Division
- Stoke City Player of the Year: 1992–93
- Football Conference top scorer: 2001–02
- Stoke City Greatest All-Time XI
