= 1992–93 Stoke City F.C. season =

Stoke City
1992–93 season
- Chairman: Peter Coates
- Manager: Lou Macari
- Stadium: Victoria Ground
- Football League Second Division: 1st (promoted)
- FA Cup: First round
- League Cup: Second round
- League Trophy: Semi-final
- Top goalscorer: League: Mark Stein (26 goals); All: Mark Stein (33 goals)
- Highest home attendance: 24,459 vs Port Vale (24 October 1992)
- Lowest home attendance: 10,867 vs Brighton & Hove Albion (16 September 1991)
- Average home league attendance: 16,556
Home colours

The 1992–93 season was Stoke City's 86th season in the Football League and 4th in the third tier now known as the Second Division following the formation of the Premier League.

After a successful 1991–92 season which saw Stoke win the Football League Trophy and reach the play-offs the team went one better in 1992–93 as they claimed the Second Division title in fine style breaking the club's unbeaten record after going 25 league matches without defeat. Stoke collected 93 points from 138 on offer and racked up an impressive +39 goal difference as the club returned to the second tier.

== Season review ==
=== League ===
With the formation of the Premier League in 1992 Stoke found themselves playing in the Second Division, still the third tier of English football. Following their excellent season in the previous campaign everyone was excited for the 1992–93 season to start and no more so than Lou Macari who signed Kevin Russell from Leicester. Stoke began their league season away at Hull City and things didn't go according to plan the "Tigers" winning 1–0.

But then things started to improve, Wigan Athletic were beaten and draws were gained at tricky Exeter and Plymouth. Stoke then beat traditional rivals West Bromwich Albion 4–3 which sparked a record breaking run of results. Stoke began to score goals on a regular basis and come the end of October, after 14 matches Stoke were in second position and after a 3–1 win away at Blackpool on 21 November Stoke went top and they were to remain there until the end of the season taking the league title and with it a return to the second tier. A tremendous run of 25 league games without defeat from 5 September 1992 to 20 February 1993, creating a new club record, Leyton Orient ending that with a single goal victory at Brisbane Road. The average attendance had risen by 3,000 to 16,556 and Mark Stein ran away with the goalscoring hitting 33 goals with 26 coming in the league.

=== FA Cup ===
Stoke drew local rivals Port Vale in the first round and after a 0–0 draw at the Victoria Ground, Vale went on to win the replay 3–1 at a waterlogged Vale Park which saw a shot from Dave Regis that was heading for goal get stuck in the mud.

=== League Cup ===
After easily beating Preston North End Stoke lost against Cambridge United.

=== League Trophy ===
Stoke went in the League trophy as holders and but for the second time this season Port Vale knocked Stoke out of a cup competition at the semi-final stage.

== Final league table ==
Pos	Team	Pld	W	D	L	GF	GA	GD	Pts	Qualification or relegation
1	Stoke City (C, P)	46	27	12	7	73	34	+39	93	Promotion to the First Division
2	Bolton Wanderers (P)	46	27	9	10	80	41	+39	90	Promotion to the First Division
3	Port Vale	46	26	11	9	79	44	+35	89	Qualification for the Second Division play-offs
4	West Bromwich Albion (O, P)	46	25	10	11	88	54	+34	85	Qualification for the Second Division play-offs
5	Swansea City	46	20	13	13	65	47	+18	73	Qualification for the Second Division play-offs

Rules for classification: 1) Points; 2) Goals scored; 3) Goal difference
(C) Champions; (O) Play-off winners; (P) Promoted

== Results ==
=== Legend ===
Win	Draw	Loss

=== Football League Second Division ===
Match	Date	Opponent	Venue	Result	Attendance	Scorers
1	15 August 1992	Hull City	A	0–1	9,088	
2	22 August 1992	Wigan Athletic	H	2–1	12,902	Biggins 7', Foley 70'
3	29 August 1992	Exeter City	A	2–2	4,106	Stein (2) 23', 25'
4	2 September 1992	Bradford City	A	1–3	5,959	Stein 18'
5	5 September 1992	Bolton Wanderers	H	0–0	14,252	
6	12 September 1992	Plymouth Argyle	A	1–1	8,208	Stein 34'
7	16 September 1992	Brighton & Hove Albion	H	1–1	10,867	Sandford 1'
8	19 September 1992	West Bromwich Albion	H	4–3	18,674	Foley 45', Russell (2) 46', 76', Cranson 83'
9	26 September 1992	Mansfield Town	A	4–0	6,820	Stein (2) 33', 45', Ware 41', Biggins 61'
10	3 October 1992	Chester City	A	1–1	5,237	Beeston 61'
11	10 October 1992	Leyton Orient	H	2–1	12,640	Stein (2) 87', 89'
12	17 October 1992	Preston North End	A	2–1	8,138	Butler 13', Sandford 40'
13	24 October 1992	Port Vale	H	2–1	24,459	Cranson 69', Stein 86' (pen)
14	31 October 1992	Burnley	A	2–0	16,667	Shaw (2) 21', 37'
15	3 November 1992	Fulham	A	0–0	5,903	
16	7 November 1992	Bournemouth	H	2–0	15,146	Stein (2) 47', 52' (1 pen)
17	21 November 1992	Blackpool	A	3–1	8,028	Russell (2) 19', 46', Stein 28'
18	28 November 1992	Swansea City	H	2–1	13,867	Shaw 47', Stein 80' (pen)
19	12 December 1992	Huddersfield Town	H	3–0	13,377	Ware (2) 75', 83', Cranson 87'
20	19 December 1992	Hartlepool United	A	2–1	4,021	Regis 7', Gleghorn 90'
21	26 December 1992	Reading	A	1–0	7,269	Regis 37'
22	28 December 1992	Rotherham United	H	2–0	21,714	Beeston 40, Foley 81'
23	9 January 1993	Brighton & Hove Albion	A	2–2	8,622	Stein 48', Foley 89'
24	16 January 1993	Mansfield Town	H	4–0	14,643	Russell 14', Gray 40' (o.g.), Regis 64', Overson 70'
25	23 January 1993	West Bromwich Albion	A	2–1	29,341	Gleghorn 11', Stein 69'
26	27 January 1993	Exeter City	H	1–1	14,181	Regis 38'
27	30 January 1993	Wigan Athletic	A	1–1	4,775	Beeston 36'
28	6 February 1993	Hull City	H	3–0	15,341	Ware 5', Foley 43', Stein 86'
29	20 February 1993	Bradford City	H	1–0	16,494	Kevan 89'
30	27 February 1993	Leyton Orient	A	0–1	10,798	
31	6 March 1993	Chester City	H	4–0	14,534	Stein (2) 23', 63', Shaw 41', Foley 66'
32	9 March 1993	Stockport County	H	2–1	17,484	Stein 47', Gleghorn 77'
33	13 March 1993	Bournemouth	A	1–1	7,129	Stein 68' (pen)
34	20 March 1993	Fulham	H	1–0	17,935	Stein 72' (pen)
35	23 March 1993	Swansea City	A	2–1	8,366	Gleghorn 51', Foley 74'
36	27 March 1993	Blackpool	H	0–1	17,918	
37	31 March 1993	Port Vale	A	2–0	20,373	Stein 4', Gleghorn 84'
38	3 April 1993	Stockport County	A	1–1	9,402	Regis 40'
39	7 April 1993	Huddersfield Town	A	0–1	11,089	
40	10 April 1993	Reading	H	2–0	16,919	Shaw 35, Gleghorn 69'
41	12 April 1993	Rotherham United	A	2–0	9,021	Stein (2) 2', 54'
42	17 April 1993	Hartlepool United	H	0–1	17,363	
43	24 April 1993	Preston North End	H	1–0	18,334	Stein 55'
44	28 April 1993	Plymouth Argyle	H	1–0	19,718	Gleghorn 4'
45	4 May 1993	Bolton Wanderers	A	0–1	19,238	
46	8 May 1993	Burnley	H	1–1	21,840	Stein 64'

=== FA Cup ===
Round	Date	Opponent	Venue	Result	Attendance	Scorers
R1	16 November 1992	Port Vale	H	0–0	24,490	
R1 Replay	24 November 1992	Port Vale	A	1–3	19,810	Sandford 24'

=== League Cup ===
Round	Date	Opponent	Venue	Result	Attendance	Scorers
R1 1st Leg	8 August 1992	Preston North End	A	1–2	5,581	Stein 8'
R1 2nd Leg	26 August 1992	Preston North End	H	4–0 (aet)	9,745	Stein 91', Overson 95', Biggins (2) 102', 105'
R2 1st Leg	22 September 1992	Cambridge United	A	2–2	3,426	Stein (2) 34', 63'
R2 2nd Leg	7 October 1992	Cambridge United	H	1–2	10,732	Shaw 68'

=== League Trophy ===
Round	Date	Opponent	Venue	Result	Attendance	Scorers
Preliminary Round 1	15 December 1992	Wrexham	A	2–0	3,974	Russell 17', Ware 26'
Preliminary Round 2	6 January 1993	Crewe Alexandra	H	2–2	9,714	Stein 33', Regis 35'
Southern Round 2	20 January 1993	Barnet	H	4–1	8,892	Foley (3) 14', 72', 82', Gleghorn 66'
Southern Quarter-final	16 February 1993	West Bromwich Albion	H	2–1	17,568	Stein (2) 78', 90'
Southern Semi-final	3 March 1993	Port Vale	H	0–1	22,267	

=== Isle of Man Trophy ===
Round	Opponent	Result
Quarter-final	Isle of Man XI	4–1
Semi-final	Wigan Athletic	2–0
Final	Wrexham	5–0

=== Friendlies ===
Match	Opponent	Venue	Result
1	Newcastle Town	A	5–0
2	Derby County	H	1–1
3	Aston Villa	A	1–4
4	Weston St. Johns	A	5–3

== Squad statistics ==
Pos.	Name	League		FA Cup		League Cup		League Trophy		Total	
Pos.	Name	Apps	Goals	Apps	Goals	Apps	Goals	Apps	Goals	Apps	Goals
GK	(England) Peter Fox	10	0	0	0	0	0	0	0	10	0
GK	(Zimbabwe) Bruce Grobbelaar	4	0	0	0	0	0	0	0	4	0
GK	(England) Brian Horne	1	0	0	0	1	0	0	0	2	0
GK	(England) Tony Parks	2	0	0	0	1	0	0	0	3	0
GK	(Scotland) Ronnie Sinclair	29	0	2	0	2	0	5	0	38	0
DF	(England) John Butler	44	1	2	0	4	0	5	0	55	1
DF	(England) Ian Cranson	45	3	2	0	4	0	4	0	55	3
DF	(England) Graham Harbey	16(1)	0	0	0	4	0	2(1)	0	22(2)	0
DF	(England) Marcus Jones	0	0	0	0	0	0	0	0	0	0
DF	(England) Vince Overson	43	1	2	0	3	1	4	0	52	2
DF	(England) Lee Sandford	42	2	2	1	4	0	4	0	52	3
DF	(England) Ian Wright	1	0	0	0	1	0	1	0	3	0
MF	(England) Carl Beeston	25(2)	3	2	0	1	0	2	0	30(2)	3
MF	(Scotland) Mark Devlin	3	0	0	0	1(1)	0	0	0	4(1)	0
MF	(England) Nigel Gleghorn	34	7	2	0	0	0	5	1	41	8
MF	(England) Dave Hockaday	7	0	0	0	0	0	0	0	7	0
MF	(Scotland) Dave Kevan	13(2)	1	0	0	0	0	1	0	14(2)	1
MF	(England) Gary Pick	0	0	0	0	0	0	0	0	0	0
MF	(Australia) Ernie Tapai	0	0	0	0	0	0	0(1)	0	0(1)	0
MF	(England) Paul Ware	21(7)	4	0	0	3	0	4	1	28(7)	5
FW	(England) Wayne Biggins	8	2	0	0	2	2	0	0	10	4
FW	(England) Steve Foley	44	7	2	0	4	0	4	3	54	10
FW	(England) Tony Kelly	2(5)	0	0	0	0(2)	0	0	0	2(7)	0
FW	(Republic of Ireland) Jimmy Mulligan	0	0	0	0	0	0	0	0	0	0
FW	(England) Dave Regis	16(9)	5	0(1)	0	0	0	3(1)	1	19(11)	6
FW	(England) Kevin Russell	30(10)	5	2	0	3	0	4(1)	1	39(11)	6
FW	(England) Graham Shaw	20(9)	5	2	0	2(1)	1	2(2)	0	26(12)	6
FW	(England) Mark Stein	46	26	2	0	4	4	5	3	57	33
–	Own goals	–	1	–	0	–	0	–	0	–	1
