= Steve Foley (footballer, born 1962) =

English footballer

Personal information
- Full name: Stephen Foley
- Date of birth: 4 October 1962 (age 64)
- Place of birth: Kirkdale, Liverpool, England
- Height: 5 ft 7 in (1.70 m)
- Position: Midfielder

Youth career
- 1978–1980: Liverpool

Senior career*
Years	Team	Apps	(Gls)
1980–1984	Liverpool	0	(0)
1983–1984	→ Fulham (loan)	3	(0)
1984–1985	Grimsby Town	31	(2)
1985–1987	Sheffield United	66	(14)
1987–1992	Swindon Town	151	(23)
1992–1994	Stoke City	107	(10)
1994–1995	Lincoln City	16	(0)
1995	Bradford City	1	(0)
Total		375	(49)
- * Club domestic league appearances and goals

Stephen Foley (born 4 October 1962) is an English former professional footballer who played as a midfielder for Liverpool, Fulham, Grimsby Town, Sheffield United, Swindon Town, Stoke City, Lincoln City and Bradford City.

== Career ==
Foley was born in Liverpool and began his career with local club Liverpool, signing a professional contract in 1980. He never made a first team appearance at Anfield, and spent a loan spell with Fulham, lasting from December 1983 to January 1984, in which he made three league appearances. Foley left Liverpool in the summer of 1984, signing a permanent deal with Grimsby Town. Foley remained at Blundell Park for just one season, making 40 appearances, scoring six goals – before signing with Sheffield United. Foley spent two seasons with the Blades, making 79 appearances, scoring 18 goals before moving to Lou Macari's Swindon Town for a fee of £40,000. Foley spent four and a half years at Swindon, making 190 appearances, scoring 29 goals before moving to Stoke City in January 1992 for a fee of £50,000 to again work under Macari.

Foley filled in at right back for the remainder of the 1991–92 season which saw him play 26 games helping Stoke reach the play-offs where they lost to Stockport County and he did play in the 1992 Football League Trophy final which Stoke won 1–0 against Stockport. He played in 54 matches, scoring ten goals in 1992–93 as Stoke won the Football League Division Two title. In 1993–94 Foley again played in 54 matches scoring just twice and was released at the end of the season. He then spent a season at Lincoln City and ended his career at Bradford City.

== Career statistics ==
Appearances and goals by club, season and competition
Club	Season	League			FA Cup		League Cup		Other^{[A]}		Total	
Club	Season	Division	Apps	Goals	Apps	Goals	Apps	Goals	Apps	Goals	Apps	Goals
Liverpool	1983–84	First Division	0	0	0	0	0	0	0	0	0	0
Fulham (loan)	1983–84	Second Division	3	0	0	0	0	0	0	0	3	0
Grimsby Town	1984–85	Second Division	31	2	3	1	6	2	0	0	40	6
Sheffield United	1985–86	Second Division	28	5	2	0	2	1	1	0	33	6
Sheffield United	1986–87	Second Division	38	9	3	1	3	2	2	0	46	12
Sheffield United	Total		66	14	5	1	5	3	3	0	79	18
Swindon Town	1987–88	Second Division	35	4	2	0	4	1	4	1	45	6
Swindon Town	1988–89	Second Division	40	8	4	2	2	0	2	0	48	10
Swindon Town	1989–90	Second Division	23	4	1	0	3	0	6	2	33	6
Swindon Town	1990–91	Second Division	44	7	3	0	4	0	1	0	52	7
Swindon Town	1991–92	Second Division	9	0	0	0	3	0	0	0	12	0
Swindon Town	Total		151	23	10	2	16	1	13	3	190	29
Stoke City	1991–92	Third Division	20	1	0	0	0	0	6	0	26	1
Stoke City	1992–93	Second Division	44	7	2	0	4	0	4	3	54	10
Stoke City	1993–94	First Division	43	2	4	0	4	0	3	0	54	2
Stoke City	Total		107	10	6	0	8	0	13	3	134	13
Lincoln City	1994–95	Third Division	16	0	2	0	1	0	2	0	21	0
Bradford City	1995–96	Second Division	1	0	0	0	0	0	0	0	1	0
Career total			375	50	26	4	36	6	31	6	468	66

A. The "Other" column constitutes appearances and goals in the Anglo-Italian Cup, Football League play-offs, Football League Trophy.

== Honours ==
Stoke City

- Football League Second Division: 1992–93
- Associate Members' Cup: 1991–92
