= Lee Todd (footballer) =

English footballer (born 1972)

Personal information
- Date of birth: 7 March 1972 (age 54)
- Place of birth: Hartlepool, England
- Height: 5 ft 5 in (1.65 m)
- Position: Defender

Youth career
- Hartlepool United

Senior career*
Years	Team	Apps	(Gls)
1989–1990	Hartlepool United	0	(0)
1990–1997	Stockport County	226	(2)
1997–1998	Southampton	10	(0)
1998–2000	Bradford City	15	(0)
1999	→ Walsall (loan)	1	(0)
2000–2003	Rochdale	50	(3)
2003	Mossley		
2003–2004	Stalybridge Celtic		
- * Club domestic league appearances and goals

Lee Todd (born 7 March 1972) is an English retired professional footballer who played as a defender.

== Playing career ==
Todd started his career in 1988 as a junior with Hartlepool United with whom he stayed until 1990.

In the summer of 1990 Todd transferred to Stockport County on a free transfer. He spent seven years at Stockport notching up a total of 226 league appearances including two promotions and a League Cup Semi-Final appearance.

In 1997 Todd was bought by his former Stockport County manager Dave Jones who was now managing Southampton paying £850,000 for his services. During his time at Southampton he played just ten league games, which included playing the full 90 minutes as Southampton won 3–2 against Liverpool at Anfield.

After spending a year in the Premier League, Todd moved on again in search of more regular football. This time it was to Bradford City for a fee of £250,000. Todd spent two years at Bradford City notching up only 15 league appearances. In September 1999, he spent a month out on loan at Walsall but was limited to just one start.

In 2000 Todd moved on again this time to Rochdale on a free transfer where he spent three years until 2003. During this period Todd clocked up 50 league appearances and scored three goals for the club.

In 2003 Todd moved on another free transfer to Mossley but spent only a month with the club before free transferring again this time to Stalybridge Celtic.

== Honours ==
Stockport County

- Associate Members' Cup / Football League Trophy runner-up: 1991–92, 1992–93
