= Lou Macari =

Scottish footballer and manager (born 1949)

Lou Macari MBE
Personal information
- Full name: Luigi Macari
- Date of birth: 7 June 1949 (age 77)
- Place of birth: Edinburgh, Scotland
- Height: 1.68 m (5 ft 6 in)
- Position: Midfielder

Youth career
- 1964–1965: Kilmarnock Amateurs
- 1965–1966: St Michael's Kilwinning
- 1966–1968: Celtic

Senior career*
Years	Team	Apps	(Gls)
1966–1973	Celtic	58	(26)
1973–1984	Manchester United	329	(78)
1984–1986	Swindon Town	36	(3)
Total		423	(107)

International career
1972	Scotland U23	2	(0)
1972–1978	Scotland	24	(5)

Managerial career
- 1984–1989: Swindon Town
- 1989–1990: West Ham United
- 1991: Birmingham City
- 1991–1993: Stoke City
- 1993–1994: Celtic
- 1994–1997: Stoke City
- 2000: Huddersfield Town (caretaker)
- 2000–2002: Huddersfield Town
- * Club domestic league appearances and goals

Luigi Macari MBE (born 7 June 1949) is a Scottish former footballer and manager. He began his playing career at Celtic where he was one of the Quality Street Gang, the outstanding reserve team that emerged in the late 1960s that also included Kenny Dalglish and Danny McGrain. He is best known for his time at Manchester United, where he played over 400 games. He helped them win promotion back to the First Division and then played in their FA Cup win of 1977. He then finished his playing career at Swindon Town.

Macari was the manager of Swindon, West Ham United, Birmingham City, Stoke City (two spells), Celtic and Huddersfield Town.

== Playing career ==
=== Celtic ===
Lou Macari was the only child of Margaret and Albert; he was born in Edinburgh, and spent the first year of his life with his family in the village of Newtongrange, before the family moved to London. His father was in the catering industry, and had represented the British Army at football. The family moved to Largs in North Ayrshire when Macari was aged nine. He was spotted playing for Ayrshire county by Celtic, and signed schoolboy forms for the club at the age of 16. He turned professional at the club in 1968, on wages of £15 a week.

Macari quickly became part of the renowned reserve side known as the Quality Street Gang that also included Kenny Dalglish, Danny McGrain and David Hay. In August 1968, Celtic Reserves needed to defeat Partick Thistle Reserves by at least seven goals to win their Reserve League Cup section over Rangers Reserves. Celtic won 12–0, with Macari scoring four goals. Macari scored 91 goals in two seasons for the reserves and in occasional first team games, having broken through into the Celtic first team in 1970. In 1971, he replaced Willie Wallace in the starting line up for the replay of the 1971 Scottish Cup Final, and scored for Celtic in a 2–1 win over Rangers.

=== Manchester United ===
After a promising start to his playing career with Celtic, he moved south of the border in 1973 for £200,000 to sign for Manchester United, where he spent the bulk of his playing career. During his time with Celtic he had scored 57 goals in 100 appearances since making his first team debut in 1970. He won three League titles and two Scottish Cups in his time at Celtic.

His first game for Manchester United came in January 1973 against West Ham United in which he scored a point-saving goal in a 2–2 draw. In 1977, his deflected shot off teammate Jimmy Greenhoff won Manchester United the FA Cup final against Liverpool (and ultimately denied Liverpool the European treble). He made 400 appearances for the club, scoring 98 goals.

Macari's early career at Old Trafford was spent trying to lead an attack that struggled to achieve anything. Relegation to the Second division in 1974 was the low point but Macari blossomed as a midfielder in the following seasons under Tommy Docherty, as United began to win back a large following with attacking football in which Macari enjoyed popularity alongside players such as Gordon Hill, Steve Coppell and the Greenhoff brothers.

Macari helped United win the Second Division title in 1975. They finished third on their return to the top flight and were runners-up in the FA Cup before going one better and lifting the trophy a year later. He was on the losing side in the 1979 final against Arsenal, and also played in a string of European campaigns during the late 1970s and early 1980s.

=== Scotland ===
Macari won two Scotland Under 23 caps in early 1972, before making his debut for the full Scotland national team in May 1972 against Wales. He was a member of the Scotland squad for the 1978 World Cup tournament in Argentina. However, he attracted widespread criticism when it emerged that he had led complaints that the £20,000 bonuses the players would receive if they won the World Cup were too low, then made extra money by selling stories to the press about the disarray and tensions within the Scottish camp. As it turned out, the Scotland team lost their first match to Peru, and drew with Iran. They beat the Netherlands 3–2 but this was insufficient to proceed in the tournament and the Scotland squad returned home without qualifying for the knock-out stage. Macari and his team-mates did not receive the bonuses which were the subject of contention. He won a total of 24 senior caps, scoring five international goals.

== Management career ==
After leaving Manchester United in 1984, he managed Swindon Town, West Ham United, Stoke City (twice), Celtic, Birmingham City and Huddersfield Town. As a manager Macari insisted upon a strict fitness regime, which included extra sessions in the players' free time and the banning of alcohol in and around the club.

When I took my first management job at Swindon in the old Fourth Division, one of the things I had to adjust to was the fact I was working with players with lesser ability than at Old Trafford. There was a danger of demanding they play like top-flight footballers and then become frustrated with them when they couldn't. But I didn't see any reason why the players at Swindon couldn't be as fit as the players at Manchester United. That was something we worked really hard on, the players accepted it, and we reaped the rewards with promotion in my second season."

— Macari recalls his Swindon days.

=== Swindon Town ===
His successes in management came with two promotions at Swindon Town (Fourth Division champions in 1986 and Third Division play-off winners in 1987). Harry Gregg, Swindon's assistant manager, did not like the style of play implemented by Macari. The divide between Macari and Gregg became more noticeable, so the board chaired by Maurice Earle sacked both of them on Good Friday, 5 April 1985. Macari was then reinstated as manager on 10 April 1985 after a fan-led protest, Swindon then went unbeaten for their next six games, winning, four, and Macari won the Manager of the Month award. The following season, 1985–86 saw Macari collect four Manager of the Month awards as he led Swindon to the Division 4 title with a record-breaking 102-point tally. A second consecutive promotion was achieved in 1987 with a play-off final victory over Gillingham at Selhurst Park. In 1989, Macari was fined £1,000 by the Football Association after he bet on Swindon to lose an FA Cup tie against Newcastle United. In 1992, he was tried and acquitted for tax fraud which took place while he was Swindon's manager; the club's then chairman was found guilty.

=== West Ham United ===
His achievements at Swindon earned Macari a move to West Ham United in 1989–90, becoming the first manager there never to have worked for the club in a previous capacity. Macari was given the job on 3 July 1989. He had a reputation for discipline and tried to change the training and dietary habits of the players. This met with some disapproval within the playing ranks. Macari bought in new recruits in future regular players, Luděk Mikloško, Trevor Morley, Martin Allen, and Ian Bishop. His team struggled to make much headway towards promotion and by the end of 1989 were in tenth place in The Second Division. They were also knocked out of the FA Cup by Torquay United on 6 January 1990 in the Third Round. Shortly after this it emerged that Macari was being investigated for betting irregularities whilst at his former club, Swindon Town. Macari left West Ham on 18 February 1990, shortly before a league match against his former club Swindon. His last game in charge was an infamous 0–6 thrashing away at Oldham Athletic in the first leg of the League Cup semi final.

=== Birmingham City ===
Macari was appointed as manager at Birmingham City in February 1991. He guided the Blues to a 3–2 victory over Tranmere Rovers in the 1991 Football League Trophy Final.

=== Stoke City ===
On 18 June 1991 Macari was appointed manager at Stoke City. Stoke at the time had just finished in their lowest league position and Macari had the task to turn around the fortunes of the club. He brought in Steve Foley (£50,000 from Swindon Town), Vince Overson (£55,000 from Birmingham City), Ronnie Sinclair (£25,000 from Bristol City) and forward Mark Stein from Oxford United for what turned out to be a bargain £100,000.

Stoke in 1991–92 were in the hunt for automatic promotion all season eventually having to settle for a play-off place where they came up against Stockport County. The first leg at Edgeley Park saw County win 1–0 thanks to a free-kick from Lee Todd after Carl Beeston had been sent-off and in the second leg Stoke went behind in the first minute and despite Stein pulling one back Stoke went out 2–1 on aggregate. Just days after losing to Stockport in the play-offs, they met again in the 1992 Football League Trophy Final where Stoke won 1–0. The 1992–93 season saw Stoke win the Second Division title after amassing 93 points and also went on a club record unbeaten run of 25 games.

=== Celtic ===
In October 1993, Macari left Stoke City and returned to Scotland to manage Celtic. Despite defeating Rangers 2–1 at Ibrox in his first match, his time at Celtic Park was unsuccessful. Macari made several moves in the transfer market – none of them particularly successful. Gerry Creaney, one of the few consistent goalscorers at Celtic at that time, was played out of position on the right-wing for several weeks before being sold to Portsmouth for £600,000. Striker Willie Falconer was signed from Sheffield United, right-back Lee Martin and goalkeeper Carl Muggleton came north from England, and in what is considered one of Macari's poorest moves, Andy Payton moved to Barnsley in a part-exchange deal for journeyman striker Wayne Biggins. A miserable 4–2 defeat by Rangers in the New Year fixture at Parkhead left Celtic languishing in the league. An early Scottish Cup exit in January 1994 at Motherwell sealed another dismal season for Celtic. Fergus McCann took over as owner of Celtic in March 1994 and duly sacked Macari three months later.

=== Return to Stoke City ===
Macari returned to Stoke in September 1994. Stoke finished in a mid-table position of 11th in 1994–95 before the partnership of Mike Sheron and Simon Sturridge in 1995–96 produced 29 goals and earned Stoke a place in the play-offs. Stoke's opponents in the play-offs were Martin O'Neill's Leicester City whom Stoke had already beaten twice in the league. The first leg at Filbert Street ended 0–0. In the second leg, Stoke produced a poor performance and Leicester scored the only goal, Garry Parker's left-foot volley ended Stoke's hopes of promotion. The 1996–97 campaign saw Stoke play their final season at the Victoria Ground which ended with a mid-table finish of 12th. Macari announced he was leaving at the end of the season which was a surprise but he was 'stripped of his duties' before he left and later launched a lawsuit against Peter Coates for wrongful dismissal.

=== Huddersfield Town ===
Macari joined Huddersfield Town in December 1999 as the club's European Scout and formed part of Steve Bruce's backroom staff. The following season, in October 2000, Bruce was sacked and Huddersfield, who were in relegation trouble after a poor start to the season, asked Macari to step in as caretaker manager. He was appointed as the permanent manager four games later and despite a valiant effort to rescue the club, he couldn't prevent them from being relegated from Division One at the end of the 2000–01 campaign.

Macari managed to steady the ship in 2001–02 and lead the club into the Second Division play-offs as the Terriers looked to bounce straight back up. However they were defeated by Brentford in the semi-finals. Macari's contract was not renewed for the next season with Huddersfield's board stating his defensive style of football as the reason. This was to be Macari's last managerial role and despite being linked with various positions since has not ventured back into management.

== Post-retirement activities ==
Macari currently lives in Stoke-on-Trent and works as a pundit for MUTV on several shows. He is a regular guest on Match Day Live before Manchester United home and away games. As well as phone-in shows such as Wednesday Night Phone-in he occasionally does punditry for Sky Sports, and also writes regular comment pieces for the Stoke-on-Trent newspaper The Sentinel. He has given several guest talks at Staffordshire University on the Sports Journalism courses. Macari also owns the "Lou Macari Chip Shop" on Chester Road, near Old Trafford. He wrote his autobiography in October 2009 called Football, My Life.

Macari was portrayed by Scottish actor Tony Curran in the 2014 television film Marvellous, based on the life of former Stoke City kitman Neil Baldwin.

== Personal life ==
Macari's mother died just before the 1978 World Cup in strange circumstances. He subsequently discovered that she had overdosed on tablets. "My mum had been on her own, and in the conversation I'd had with her she said she had some friends up there. Putting the pieces together after she died, I just wasn't convinced that the friends were good friends. Some money had gone missing."

His sons Michael and Paul have played professionally with Stoke, when Macari was manager of the club. His youngest son Jonathan died by suicide in 1999 after being released from his contract at Nottingham Forest. Family friend and former manager Dave Bassett said that Jonathan could not handle the pressure of living up to his father's greatness. There was also talk of drugs affecting his son's life and leading to his suicide, but Macari later discounted that theory, admitting that much like the death of his mother, the complete story behind the tragedy may never be known. Years later he said that "money in a young man's pocket is a recipe for disaster and we had that disaster. Only when you go through something like that do you understand the hell of it."

His grandson Lewis plays for Notts County, having signed from Stoke City.

Macari worked with Stoke-on-Trent council to set up The Macari Centre, a street retreat to house the homeless sleeping rough, which opened in February 2016. In the COVID-19 pandemic, following the closure of the crowded premises of The Macari Centre, Macari rented a warehouse and filled it with glamping pods for homeless people, giving them socially distanced places of their own and their own individual addresses.

Macari was appointed Member of the Order of the British Empire (MBE) in the 2026 Birthday Honours for services to association football and to homeless people in Stoke-on-Trent.

== Career statistics ==
=== As a player ===
==== Club ====
Appearances and goals by club, season and competition
Club	Season	League			FA Cup		League Cup		Europe		Other^{[A]}		Total	
Club	Season	Division	Apps	Goals	Apps	Goals	Apps	Goals	Apps	Goals	Apps	Goals	Apps	Goals
Celtic	1967–68	Scottish Division One	0	0	0	0	1	0	0	0	0	0	1	0
Celtic	1968–69	Scottish Division One	1	1	0	0	3	0	0	0	0	0	4	1
Celtic	1969–70	Scottish Division One	15	7	2	2	0	0	0	0	2	1	19	10
Celtic	1970–71	Scottish Division One	11	5	1	1	8	5	1	2	0	0	21	13
Celtic	1971–72	Scottish Division One	20	10	5	5	6	5	8	4	3	1	42	25
Celtic	1972–73	Scottish Division One	11	3	0	0	6	4	3	2	3	0	23	9
Celtic	Total		58	26	8	8	24	14	12	8	8	2	110	58
Manchester United	1972–73	First Division	16	5	0	0	0	0	0	0	3	0	19	5
Manchester United	1973–74	First Division	35	5	2	1	1	0	0	0	0	0	38	6
Manchester United	1974–75	Second Division	38	11	2	0	7	7	0	0	0	0	47	18
Manchester United	1975–76	First Division	36	12	6	1	3	2	0	0	0	0	45	15
Manchester United	1976–77	First Division	38	9	7	3	4	1	4	1	0	0	53	14
Manchester United	1977–78	First Division	32	8	4	3	1	0	2	0	1	0	40	11
Manchester United	1978–79	First Division	32	6	5	0	1	0	0	0	0	0	38	6
Manchester United	1979–80	First Division	39	9	2	0	3	0	0	0	0	0	44	9
Manchester United	1980–81	First Division	38	9	2	0	2	0	1	0	0	0	43	9
Manchester United	1981–82	First Division	11	2	2	0	0	0	0	0	0	0	13	2
Manchester United	1982–83	First Division	9	2	1	0	3	0	1	0	0	0	14	2
Manchester United	1983–84	First Division	5	0	1	0	2	0	2	0	0	0	10	0
Manchester United	Total		329	78	34	8	27	10	10	1	4	0	404	97
Swindon Town	1984–85	Fourth Division	27	3	1	0	1	0	0	0	2	1	31	4
Swindon Town	1985–86	Fourth Division	9	0	0	0	3	0	0	0	0	0	12	0
Swindon Town	Total		36	3	1	0	4	0	0	0	2	1	43	4
Career total			423	107	43	16	55	24	22	9	14	3	557	159

A. The "Other" column constitutes appearances and goals in the Anglo-Italian Cup, Drybrough Cup, FA Charity Shield, Football League Trophy and Glasgow Cup.

==== International ====
Appearances and goals by national team and year
National team	Year	Apps	Goals
Scotland	1972	6	3
Scotland	1973	4	0
Scotland	1975	5	0
Scotland	1977	6	2
Scotland	1978	3	0
Total		24	5

=== As a manager ===
Managerial record by team and tenure
Team	From	To	Record				
Team	From	To	P	W	D	L	Win %
Swindon Town	23 July 1984	3 July 1989	285	138	67	80	48.4
West Ham United	3 July 1989	18 February 1990	40	15	12	13	37.5
Birmingham City	7 February 1991	18 June 1991	24	12	6	6	50.0
Stoke City	18 June 1991	26 October 1993	138	69	38	31	50.0
Celtic	27 October 1993	14 June 1994	34	12	14	8	35.3
Stoke City	29 September 1994	1 July 1997	151	55	47	49	36.4
Huddersfield Town	16 October 2000	14 June 2002	93	36	29	28	38.7
Total			765	337	213	215	44.1

== Honours ==
=== As a player ===
Celtic

- Scottish Division One: 1969–70, 1970–71, 1971–72, 1972–73
- Scottish Cup: 1970–71, 1971–72
- Scottish League Cup runner-up: 1969–70, 1970–71, 1971–72

Manchester United

- Football League Second Division: 1974–75
- FA Cup: 1976–77; runner-up: 1975–76, 1978–79
- FA Charity Shield: 1977 (shared), 1983
- Football League Cup runner-up: 1982–83

=== As a manager ===
Swindon Town

- Football League Fourth Division: 1985–86
- Football League Third Division play-offs: 1987

Birmingham City

- Associate Members' Cup: 1990–91

Stoke City

- Football League Second Division: 1992–93
- Associate Members' Cup: 1991–92

Individual

- Football League First Division Manager of the Month: December 2000
- LMA John Duncan Award: 2023
