= 1991–92 Associate Members' Cup =

1991–92 Associate Members Cup
Autoglass Trophy

Tournament details
- Country: England; Wales

The 1991–92 Associate Members' Cup, known as the 1991–92 Autoglass Trophy, was the eleventh staging of a secondary football league tournament, and the ninth staging of the Associate Members' Cup, a knock-out competition for English football clubs in the Third Division and the Fourth Division. The winners were Stoke City and the runners-up were Stockport County.

The competition began on 15 October 1991 and ended with the final on 16 May 1992 at Wembley Stadium.

In the first round, there were two sections split into eight groups: North and South. In the following rounds each section gradually eliminates teams in knock-out fashion until each has a winning finalist. At this point, the two winning finalists faced each other in the combined final for the honour of the trophy.

== Preliminary round ==
Byes to first round: Rotherham United and Chesterfield

=== Northern Section ===
Group 1
Team	Pld	W	D	L	GF	GA	GD	Pts
Burnley	2	2	0	0	5	1	+4	6
Blackpool	2	0	1	1	3	5	−2	1
Doncaster Rovers	2	0	1	1	2	4	−2	1

Date	Team 1	Score	Team 2
22 Oct	Blackpool	1–3	Burnley
19 Nov	Burnley	2–0	Doncaster Rovers
17 Dec	Doncaster Rovers	2–2	Blackpool

Group 2
Team	Pld	W	D	L	GF	GA	GD	Pts
Crewe Alexandra	2	1	1	0	4	3	+1	4
Chester City	2	1	0	1	3	3	0	3
Darlington	2	0	1	1	3	4	−1	1

Date	Team 1	Score	Team 2
22 Oct	Darlington	2–2	Crewe Alexandra
19 Nov	Crewe Alexandra	2–1	Chester City
7 Jan	Chester City	2–1	Darlington

Group 3
Team	Pld	W	D	L	GF	GA	GD	Pts
Hartlepool United	2	1	1	0	5	3	+2	4
Hull City	2	1	0	1	2	3	−1	3
Bradford City	2	0	1	1	4	5	−1	1

Date	Team 1	Score	Team 2
22 Oct	Hull City	2–1	Bradford City
19 Nov	Bradford City	3–3	Hartlepool United
7 Jan	Hartlepool United	2–0	Hull City

Group 4
Team	Pld	W	D	L	GF	GA	GD	Pts
Preston North End	2	1	1	0	3	2	+1	4
Bolton Wanderers	2	1	0	1	5	3	+2	3
Rochdale	2	0	1	1	2	5	−3	1

Date	Team 1	Score	Team 2
22 Oct	Rochdale	1–1	Preston North End
19 Nov	Preston North End	2–1	Bolton Wanderers
10 Dec	Bolton Wanderers	4–1	Rochdale

Group 5
Team	Pld	W	D	L	GF	GA	GD	Pts
Bury	2	1	1	0	5	3	+2	4
Scunthorpe United	2	1	0	1	3	3	0	3
Halifax Town	2	0	1	1	2	4	−2	1

Date	Team 1	Score	Team 2
22 Oct	Scunthorpe United	1–3	Bury
19 Nov	Bury	2–2	Halifax Town
7 Jan	Halifax Town	0–2	Scunthorpe United

Group 6
Team	Pld	W	D	L	GF	GA	GD	Pts
Huddersfield Town	2	1	1	0	2	1	+1	4
Scarborough	2	0	2	0	2	2	0	2
Wigan Athletic	2	0	1	1	1	2	−1	1

Date	Team 1	Score	Team 2
22 Oct	Wigan Athletic	0–1	Huddersfield Town
19 Nov	Huddersfield Town	1–1	Scarborough
8 Jan	Scarborough	1–1	Wigan Athletic

Group 7
Team	Pld	W	D	L	GF	GA	GD	Pts
Carlisle United	2	1	1	0	5	1	+4	4
Stockport County	2	1	0	1	3	4	−1	3
York City	2	0	1	1	1	4	−3	1

Date	Team 1	Score	Team 2
22 Oct	York City	1–1	Carlisle United
19 Nov	Carlisle United	4–0	Stockport County
7 Jan	Stockport County	3–0	York City

=== Southern Section ===
Group 1
Team	Pld	W	D	L	GF	GA	GD	Pts
Barnet	2	2	0	0	9	3	+6	6
Brentford	2	1	0	1	5	6	−1	3
Aldershot	2	0	0	2	0	5	−5	0

Date	Team 1	Score	Team 2
22 Oct	Aldershot	0–2	Brentford
19 Nov	Barnet	3–0	Aldershot
17 Dec	Brentford	3–6	Barnet

Group 2
Team	Pld	W	D	L	GF	GA	GD	Pts
Bournemouth	2	1	1	0	6	3	+3	4
Cardiff City	2	0	2	0	3	3	0	2
Swansea City	2	0	1	1	0	3	−3	1

Date	Team 1	Score	Team 2
22 Oct	Bournemouth	3–0	Swansea City
19 Nov	Swansea City	0–0	Cardiff City
10 Dec	Cardiff City	3–3	Bournemouth

Group 3
Team	Pld	W	D	L	GF	GA	GD	Pts
Leyton Orient	2	2	0	0	3	1	+2	6
Northampton Town	2	1	0	1	3	2	+1	3
Reading	2	0	0	2	0	3	−3	0

Date	Team 1	Score	Team 2
22 Oct	Leyton Orient	1–0	Reading
20 Nov	Reading	0–2	Northampton Town
3 Dec	Northampton Town	1–2	Leyton Orient

Group 4
Team	Pld	W	D	L	GF	GA	GD	Pts
Peterborough United	2	2	0	0	5	0	+5	6
Wrexham	2	1	0	1	1	2	−1	3
Mansfield Town	2	0	0	2	0	4	−4	0

Date	Team 1	Score	Team 2
15 Oct	Wrexham	1–0	Mansfield Town
22 Oct	Peterborough United	2–0	Wrexham
4 Feb	Mansfield Town	0–3	Peterborough United

Group 5
Team	Pld	W	D	L	GF	GA	GD	Pts
Stoke City	2	2	0	0	5	1	+4	6
Walsall	2	1	0	1	1	2	−1	3
Birmingham City	2	0	0	2	1	4	−3	0

Date	Team 1	Score	Team 2
22 Oct	Walsall	0–2	Stoke City
18 Dec	Stoke City	3–1	Birmingham City
7 Jan	Birmingham City	0–1	Walsall

Group 6
Team	Pld	W	D	L	GF	GA	GD	Pts
West Bromwich Albion	2	2	0	0	6	1	+5	6
Shrewsbury Town	2	1	0	1	1	4	−3	3
Lincoln City	2	0	0	2	1	3	−2	0

Date	Team 1	Score	Team 2
22 Oct	West Bromwich Albion	4–0	Shrewsbury Town
19 Nov	Shrewsbury Town	1–0	Lincoln City
4 Dec	Lincoln City	1–2	West Bromwich Albion

Group 7
Team	Pld	W	D	L	GF	GA	GD	Pts
Hereford United	2	2	0	0	3	1	+2	6
Exeter City	2	1	0	1	3	3	0	3
Torquay United	2	0	0	2	1	3	−2	0

Date	Team 1	Score	Team 2
23 Oct	Exeter City	2–1	Torquay United
19 Nov	Torquay United	0–1	Hereford United
7 Jan	Hereford United	2–1	Exeter City

Group 8
Team	Pld	W	D	L	GF	GA	GD	Pts
Fulham	2	2	0	0	8	2	+6	6
Gillingham	2	1	0	1	4	4	0	3
Maidstone United	2	0	0	2	4	10	−6	0

Date	Team 1	Score	Team 2
23 Oct	Maidstone United	2–6	Fulham
20 Nov	Fulham	2–0	Gillingham
10 Dec	Gillingham	4–2	Maidstone United

== First round ==
=== Northern Section ===
Date	Home team	Score	Away team
14 January	Bury	2–1	Chesterfield
14 January	Carlisle United	1–3	Stockport County
14 January	Crewe Alexandra	2–0	Bolton Wanderers
14 January	Preston North End	2 – 3	Hull City
21 January	Hartlepool United	2–1	Scunthorpe United
21 January	Huddersfield Town	1–1	Blackpool
Huddersfield Town won 3–1 on penalties
21 January	Rotherham United	3–0	Chester City
4 February	Burnley	3–1	Scarborough

=== Southern Section ===
Date	Home team	Score	Away team
14 January	Barnet	3–2	Northampton Town
14 January	Fulham	2–0	Gillingham
14 January	Stoke City	3–0	Cardiff City
14 January	West Bromwich Albion	0–1	Exeter City
21 January	Hereford United	0 – 1	Walsall
21 January	Leyton Orient	3–2	Brentford
18 February	Bournemouth	1–2	Wrexham
18 February	Peterborough United	1–0	Shrewsbury Town

== Quarter-finals ==
=== Northern Section ===
Date	Home team	Score	Away team
4 February	Bury	1–2	Huddersfield Town
4 February	Crewe Alexandra	1–0	Hull City
4 February	Stockport County	3–0	Hartlepool United
18 February	Rotherham United	1–1	Burnley
Burnley won 4–2 on penalties

=== Southern Section ===
Date	Home team	Score	Away team
4 February	Barnet	0–1	Leyton Orient
5 February	Stoke City	3–1	Walsall
25 February	Fulham	0–2	Wrexham
25 February	Peterborough United	1–0	Exeter City

== Area semi-finals ==
=== Northern Section ===
Date	Home team	Score	Away team
17 March	Burnley	2–0	Huddersfield Town
17 March	Crewe Alexandra	1–2	Stockport County

=== Southern Section ===
Date	Home team	Score	Away team
17 March	Leyton Orient	0–1	Stoke City
17 March	Peterborough United	3–1	Wrexham

== Area finals ==
=== Northern Area final ===
7 April 1992

Burnley	0–1	Stockport County

Turf Moor, Burnley
Attendance: 13,259
15 April 1992

Stockport County	(3) 2 – 1 (1)	Burnley

Edgeley Park, Stockport
Attendance: 8,260

=== Southern Area final ===
6 April 1992

Stoke City	3–3	Peterborough United

Victoria Ground, Stoke-on-Trent
Attendance: 14,355
15 April 1992

Peterborough United	(3) 0 – 1 (4)	Stoke City

London Road Stadium, Peterborough
Attendance: 12,214

== Final ==
16 May 1992

Stoke City	1–0	Stockport County
Stein 65'

Wembley Stadium, London
Attendance: 48,339
Referee: R.Hart (Darlington)

== Notes ==
General

- statto.com

Specific
