= 1990–91 Birmingham City F.C. season =

Birmingham City F.C.
1990–91 season
- Chairman: Samesh Kumar
- Manager: Dave Mackay; (until January 1991); Lou Macari; (until 19 June)
- Ground: St Andrew's
- Football League Third Division: 12th
- FA Cup: Second round (eliminated by Brentford)
- League Cup: First round (eliminated by AFC Bournemouth)
- Associate Members' Cup: Winners
- Top goalscorer: League: John Gayle; Nigel Gleghorn; Simon Sturridge (6); All: John Gayle; Simon Sturridge (10)
- Highest home attendance: 16,219 vs Brentford, Associate Members' Cup Southern Final, 26 March 1991
- Lowest home attendance: 2,922 vs Lincoln City, Associate Members' Cup prelim round, 27 November 1990
- Average home league attendance: 7,030
Home colours

The 1990–91 Football League season was Birmingham City Football Club's 88th in the Football League and their second in the Third Division. They finished in 12th position in the 24-team division, their lowest finish ever in the Football League. They entered the 1990–91 FA Cup in the first round proper and lost to Brentford in the second, and entered at and lost in the first round of the League Cup, beaten over two legs by AFC Bournemouth. They won the Associate Members' Cup, a cup competition open to clubs in the third and fourth tiers of the English football league system, defeating Tranmere Rovers 3–2 in the final at Wembley Stadium with goals from Simon Sturridge and two from John Gayle.

Off the field, Dave Mackay resigned as manager in January 1991, to be replaced by Lou Macari on a non-contract basis. With the club in financial difficulties, Macari and his staff walked out of the club in June to join Stoke City.

When I took over the Birmingham job without any contract, things were so bad the chairman asked me to raise £250,000 by the end of the season. It looked impossible, but the revenue was delivered with the great run in the Leyland Daf. It's no secret that, if we hadn't got to Wembley, Birmingham would have been in financial trouble and might have gone under.

Many of the playing staff were out of contract and reluctant to renew, and an action group was formed to try to remove the chairman.

== Football League Third Division ==
Date	League position	Opponents	Venue	Result	Score F–A	Scorers	Attendance
25 August 1990	9th	Cambridge United	A	W	1–0	Gleghorn	6,338
1 September 1990	3rd	Leyton Orient	H	W	3–1	Bailey, Hopkins, Moran	5,847
8 September 1990	2nd	Stoke City	A	W	1–0	Gleghorn	16,135
15 September 1990	2nd	Bury	H	W	1–0	Peer	7,344
18 September 1990	3rd	Exeter City	H	D	1–1	Bailey	7,703
22 September 1990	3rd	Wigan Athletic	A	D	1–1	Tait	3,904
29 September 1990	3rd	Preston North End	H	D	1–1	Bailey	7,154
2 October 1990	4th	Fulham	A	D	2–2	Matthewson, Overson	4,011
6 October 1990	5th	Reading	A	D	2–2	Matthewson, Sturridge	5,695
13 October 1990	5th	Southend United	H	D	1–1	Sturridge	9,333
20 October 1990	4th	Grimsby Town	H	D	0–0		10,123
23 October 1990	5th	Crewe Alexandra	A	D	1–1	Gleghorn	4,449
27 October 1990	7th	Shrewsbury Town	A	L	1–4	Bailey	6,150
3 November 1990	11th	Huddersfield Town	H	L	1–2	Tait	7,412
10 November 1990	8th	Chester City	A	W	1–0	Hopkins	2,273
24 November 1990	10th	AFC Bournemouth	H	D	0–0		7,416
1 December 1990	14th	Swansea City	A	L	0–2		4,896
15 December 1990	11th	Rotherham United	H	W	2–1	Tait, Overson	4,734
21 December 1990	12th	Tranmere Rovers	A	L	0–1		5,054
26 December 1990	15th	Brentford	H	L	0–2		6,612
29 December 1990	16th	Bolton Wanderers	H	L	1–3	Bailey	7,318
1 January 1990	15th	Mansfield Town	A	W	2–1	Gayle 2	3,654
5 January 1991	14th	Bradford City	H	D	1–1	Frain pen	6,315
12 January 1991	14th	Leyton Orient	A	D	1–1	Sturridge	4,701
19 January 1991	15th	Cambridge United	H	L	0–3		5,859
26 January 1991	14th	Bury	A	W	1–0	Sturridge	3,009
2 February 1991	12th	Exeter City	A	W	2–0	Gayle 2	5,154
5 February 1991	11th	Wigan Athletic	H	D	0–0		5,319
13 February 1991	13th	Bradford City	A	L	0–2		4,776
16 February 1991	10th	AFC Bournemouth	A	W	2–1	Sturridge, Mundee og	6,330
23 February 1991	8th	Chester City	H	W	1–0	Dolan	6,702
2 March 1991	6th	Swansea City	H	W	2–0	Sturridge, Rodgerson	6,903
9 March 1991	8th	Rotherham United	A	D	1–1	Frain pen	5,028
12 March 1991	7th	Fulham	H	W	2–0	Peer, Gleghorn	8,083
16 March 1991	10th	Preston North End	A	L	0–2		5,334
18 March 1991	10th	Southend United	A	L	1–2	Gleghorn	6,328
23 March 1991	11th	Reading	H	D	1–1	Rodgerson	6,795
30 March 1991	12th	Brentford	A	D	2–2	Frain, Gleghorn	6,757
2 April 1991	10th	Tranmere Rovers	H	W	1–0	Yates	7,675
7 April 1991	12th	Bolton Wanderers	A	L	1–3	Gayle	11,280
13 April 1991	12th	Mansfield Town	H	D	0–0		7,635
16 April 1991	11th	Stoke City	H	W	2–1	Matthewson, Hopkins	6,729
20 April 1991	11th	Grimsby Town	A	D	0–0		8,842
27 April 1991	11th	Crewe Alexandra	H	L	0–2		6,429
4 May 1991	13th	Shrewsbury Town	H	L	0–1		6,256
11 May 1991	12th	Huddersfield Town	A	W	1–0	Gayle	5,195

=== League table (part) ===
Final Third Division table (part)
Pos	Team	Pld	W	D	L	GF	GA	GD	Pts
10th	Wigan Athletic	46	20	9	17	71	54	+17	69
11th	Huddersfield Town	46	18	13	15	57	51	+6	67
12th	Birmingham City	46	16	17	13	45	49	−4	65
13th	Leyton Orient	46	18	10	18	55	58	−3	64
14th	Stoke City	46	16	12	18	55	59	−4	60

=== Results summary ===
Overall								Home						Away					
Pld	W	D	L	GF	GA	GD	Pts	W	D	L	GF	GA	GD	W	D	L	GF	GA	GD
46	16	17	13	45	49	−4	65	8	9	6	21	21	0	8	8	7	24	28	−4

== FA Cup ==
Round	Date	Opponents	Venue	Result	Score F–A	Scorers	Attendance
First round	17 November 1990	Cheltenham Town	H	W	1–0	Sturridge	7,942
Second round	12 December 1990	Brentford	H	L	1–3	Aylott	5,072

== League Cup ==
Round	Date	Opponents	Venue	Result	Score F–A	Scorers	Attendance
First round 1st leg	28 August 1990	AFC Bournemouth	H	L	0–1		5,110
First round 2nd leg	4 September 1990	AFC Bournemouth	A	D	1–1	Downs pen	4,490

== Associate Members' Cup ==
Round	Date	Opponents	Venue	Result	Score F–A	Scorers	Attendance
Preliminary round	6 November 1990	Walsall	A	W	1–0	Skipper og	5,053
Preliminary round	27 November 1990	Lincoln City	H	W	2–0	Clarke og, Sturridge	2,922
First round	18 February 1991	Swansea City	H	D	0–0; 4–2 pens		3,555
Southern area quarter-final	26 February 1991	Mansfield Town	H	W	2–0	Matthewson, Gayle	5,358
Southern area semi-final	5 March 1991	Cambridge United	H	W	3–1	Peer, Gleghorn, Overson	9,429
Southern area final 1st leg	26 March 1991	Brentford	H	W	2–1	Rodgerson, Gayle	16,219
Southern area final 2nd leg	9 April 1991	Brentford	A	W	1–0	Sturridge	8,745
Final	26 May 1991	Tranmere Rovers	Wembley	W	3–2	Sturridge, Gayle 2	58,756

== Appearances and goals ==
Numbers in parentheses denote appearances made as a substitute.
Players with name in italics and marked * were on loan from another club for the whole of their season with Birmingham.
Players marked † left the club during the playing season.
Key to positions: GK – Goalkeeper; DF – Defender; MF – Midfielder; FW – Forward

Players' appearances and goals by competition
Pos.	Nat.	Name	League		FA Cup		League Cup		Associate Members' Cup		Total	
Pos.	Nat.	Name	Apps	Goals	Apps	Goals	Apps	Goals	Apps	Goals	Apps	Goals
GK	WAL	Martin Thomas	45	0	1	0	2	0	8	0	56	0
GK	ENG	Dean Williams	1	0	1	0	0	0	0	0	2	0
DF	ENG	Kevin Ashley †	3	0	0	0	2	0	0	0	5	0
DF	ENG	Ian Clarkson	34 (3)	0	1	0	0	0	7 (1)	0	42 (4)	0
DF	ENG	Greg Downs	16 (1)	0	2	0	2	1	2	0	22 (1)	1
DF	ENG	Trevor Matthewson	46	3	2	0	2	0	8	1	58	4
DF	ENG	Gary O'Reilly *	1	0	0	0	0	0	0	0	1	0
DF	ENG	Vince Overson	40	2	2	0	1	0	8	1	51	3
DF	ENG	Ian Rodgerson	25	2	0	0	0	0	4	1	29	3
MF	SCO	Dougie Bell	1	0	0	0	0	0	0	0	1	0
MF	IRL	Eamonn Dolan	5 (5)	1	0	0	0	0	2	0	7 (5)	1
MF	ENG	John Frain	42	3	2	0	2	0	8	0	54	3
MF	ENG	Matthew Fox	9 (2)	0	0	0	1	0	0	0	10 (2)	0
MF	ENG	Andy Harris	0	0	0	0	0	0	0 (1)	0	0 (1)	0
MF	ENG	Robert Hopkins	18 (5)	3	2	1	2	0	1	0	23 (5)	4
MF	ENG	Dean Peer	37 (3)	2	2	0	2	0	8	1	49 (3)	3
MF	ENG	Mark Rutherford	1 (2)	0	0	0	0	0	0	0	1 (2)	0
MF	ENG	Paul Tait	17	3	1	0	2	0	1	0	21	3
FW	ENG	Trevor Aylott	23 (2)	0	0 (1)	1	0	0	4 (1)	0	27 (4)	1
FW	ENG	Dennis Bailey	25 (7)	5	2	0	2	0	1 (3)	0	30 (10)	5
FW	ENG	Sean Francis	0 (3)	0	0	0	0	0	0	0	0 (3)	0
FW	ENG	John Gayle	20 (2)	6	1	0	0	0	5 (1)	4	26 (3)	10
FW	ENG	Nigel Gleghorn	42	6	2	0	2	0	8	1	54	7
FW	ENG	Colin Gordon	3 (2)	0	0 (1)	0	0	0	0	0	3 (3)	0
FW	ENG	Richie Moran	2 (6)	1	0	0	0 (1)	0	0	0	2 (7)	1
FW	ENG	Phil Robinson *	9	01	0	0	0	0	2 (1)	0	11 (1)	0
FW	ENG	Simon Sturridge	33 (5)	6	2	1	0 (2)	0	8	3	43 (7)	10
FW	ENG	Mark Yates	8 (1)	1	0	0	0	0	3	0	11 (1)	1

== See also ==
- Birmingham City F.C. seasons

== Sources ==
- Matthews, Tony (1995). Birmingham City: A Complete Record. Derby: Breedon Books. ISBN 978-1-85983-010-9.
- Matthews, Tony (2010). Birmingham City: The Complete Record. Derby: DB Publishing. ISBN 978-1-85983-853-2.
- For match dates, league positions and results: "Birmingham City 1990–1991: Results". Statto Organisation. Archived from the original on 11 June 2015.
- For lineups, appearances, goalscorers and attendances: Matthews (2010), Complete Record, pp. 416–17, 480.
