= 1989–90 Birmingham City F.C. season =

Birmingham City F.C.
1989–90 season
- Chairman: Samesh Kumar
- Manager: Dave Mackay
- Ground: St Andrew's
- Football League Third Division: 7th
- FA Cup: Third round (eliminated by Oldham Athletic)
- League Cup: Second round (eliminated by West Ham United)
- Associate Members' Cup: Preliminary round
- Top goalscorer: League: Dennis Bailey (18); All: Dennis Bailey (20)
- Highest home attendance: 14,278 vs Reading, 5 May 1990
- Lowest home attendance: 3,168 vs Hereford United, Associate Members' Cup prelim round, 12 December 1989
- Average home league attendance: 8,588
Home colours

The 1989–90 Football League season was Birmingham City Football Club's 87th in the Football League and the first in their history in which they played in the third tier of the English football league system. After a sound start to the season, with six wins from the first ten games, their results worsened, and they eventually finished in seventh position in the 24-team Third Division, three points outside the playoff places. They entered the 1989–90 FA Cup in the first round proper and lost in the third, eliminated by Oldham Athletic after a replay, and entered the League Cup at the first round and lost in the second, beaten 3–2 by West Ham United over two legs. They failed to progress from their group in the preliminary round of the Associate Members' Cup, a competition open to teams in the third and fourth tiers of the League.

Dennis Bailey was the club's top scorer for the season, with 20 goals in all competitions, of which 18 came in the league.

In April 1989, the club was sold to the Kumar brothers, owners of a Manchester-based fashion and leisurewear company. Dave Mackay was brought in as general manager, previous manager Garry Pendrey refused to stay on as part of Mackay's staff, and Samesh Kumar became chairman.

== Football League Third Division ==
Date	League position	Opponents	Venue	Result	Score F–A	Scorers	Attendance
19 August 1989	1st	Crewe Alexandra	H	W	3–0	Yates, Sturridge, Bailey	10,447
26 August 1989	10th	Bristol City	A	L	0–1		8,938
2 September 1989	5th	Swansea City	H	W	2–0	Bailey, Hopkins	8,071
9 September 1989	10th	Shrewsbury Town	A	L	0–2		4,714
16 September 1989	9th	Tranmere Rovers	H	W	2–1	Gordon, Bailey	8,604
23 September 1989	4th	Brentford	A	W	1–0	Sturridge	5,386
26 September 1989	3rd	Walsall	H	W	2–0	Bailey pen., Tait	10,834
30 September 1989	3rd	Blackpool	A	L	2–3	Sturridge, Gleghorn	5,681
7 October 1989	8th	Rotherham United	A	L	1–5	Sturridge	4,676
14 October 1989	5th	Northampton Town	H	W	4–0	Gleghorn 2, Bailey 2 (1 pen.)	8,731
17 October 1989	9th	Chester City	A	L	0–4		1,890
21 October 1989	10th	Huddersfield Town	H	L	0–1		7,951
28 October 1989	11th	Bury	A	D	0–0		3,383
31 October 1989	10th	Cardiff City	H	D	1–1	Sturridge	7,468
4 November 1989	10th	Reading	A	W	2–0	Sturridge, Hicks og	3,527
11 November 1989	10th	Leyton Orient	H	D	0–0		7,491
25 November 1989	8th	Bolton Wanderers	H	W	1–0	Bailey pen.	8,081
1 December 1989	8th	Wigan Athletic	A	L	0–1		2,506
16 December 1989	7th	Preston North End	H	W	3–1	Yates, Bailey, Frain	6,391
26 December 1989	9th	Bristol Rovers	A	D	0–0		6,573
30 December 1989	9th	Notts County	A	L	2–3	Atkins pen., Bailey	7,786
1 January 1989	9th	Fulham	H	D	1–1	Gleghorn	8,932
13 January 1990	9th	Bristol City	H	L	0–4		11,277
20 January 1990	9th	Crewe Alexandra	A	W	2–0	Bailey, Sturridge	4,681
27 January 1990	9th	Shrewsbury Town	H	L	0–1		7,461
9 February 1990	10th	Tranmere Rovers	A	L	1–5	Bailey pen.	6,033
13 February 1990	11th	Swansea City	A	D	1–1	Madden	3,603
17 February 1990	10th	Wigan Athletic	H	D	0–0		5,473
24 February 1990	12th	Bolton Wanderers	A	L	1–3	Gordon	7,618
3 March 1990	11th	Mansfield Town	H	W	4–1	Sturridge, Bailey 2, Ashley	5,746
6 March 1990	9th	Blackpool	H	W	3–1	Peer, Sturridge, Bailey pen.	7,085
10 March 1990	9th	Walsall	A	W	1–0	Gleghorn	6,036
13 March 1990	10th	Brentford	H	L	0–1		8,169
17 March 1990	9th	Rotherham United	H	W	4–1	Tait, Atkins, Gordon, Sturridge	6,985
20 March 1990	9th	Northampton Town	A	D	2–2	Peer, Gleghorn	4,345
24 March 1990	10th	Chester City	H	D	0–0		7,584
31 March 1990	10th	Huddersfield Town	A	W	2–1	Bailey, Gleghorn	5,837
3 April 1990	10th	Mansfield Town	A	L	2–5	Bailey, Gleghorn	4,164
7 April 1990	10th	Bury	H	D	0–0		6,808
10 April 1990	8th	Cardiff City	A	W	1–0	Hopkins	3,322
14 April 1990	7th	Fulham	A	W	2–1	Hopkins, Gleghorn	4,568
16 April 1990	7th	Bristol Rovers	H	D	2–2	Matthewson, Hopkins	12,438
21 April 1990	7th	Preston North End	A	D	2–2	Bailey 2	7,680
24 April 1990	7th	Notts County	H	L	1–2	Hopkins	10,533
28 April 1990	7th	Leyton Orient	A	W	2–1	Peer, Hopkins	5,691
5 May 1990	7th	Reading	H	L	0–1		14,278

=== League table (part) ===
Final Third Division table (part)
Pos	Team	Pld	W	D	L	GF	GA	GD	Pts
5th	Bury	46	21	11	14	70	49	+21	74
6th	Bolton Wanderers	46	18	15	13	59	48	+11	69
7th	Birmingham City	46	18	12	16	60	59	+1	66
8th	Huddersfield Town	46	17	14	15	61	62	−1	65
9th	Rotherham United	46	17	13	16	71	62	+9	64

=== Results summary ===
Overall								Home						Away					
Pld	W	D	L	GF	GA	GD	Pts	W	D	L	GF	GA	GD	W	D	L	GF	GA	GD
46	18	12	16	60	59	+1	66	10	7	6	33	19	+14	8	5	10	27	40	−13

== FA Cup ==
Round	Date	Opponents	Venue	Result	Score F–A	Scorers	Attendance
First round	17 November 1989	Leyton Orient	A	W	1–0	Sturridge	4,063
Second round	9 December 1989	Colchester United	A	W	2–0	Gleghorn 4', 90'	3,858
Third round	7 January 1990	Oldham Athletic	H	D	1–1	Gleghorn	13,131
Third round replay	10 January 1990	Oldham Athletic	A	L	0–1		9,982

== League Cup ==
Round	Date	Opponents	Venue	Result	Score F–A	Scorers	Attendance
First round 1st leg	22 August 1989	Chesterfield	H	W	2–1	Atkins, Bailey	6,722
First round 2nd leg	28 August 1989	Chesterfield	A	W	1–0	Bailey	3,313
Second round 1st leg	19 September 1989	West Ham United	H	L	1–2	Sproson	10,987
Second round 2nd leg	4 October 1989	West Ham United	A	D	1-1	Atkins	12,187

== Associate Members' Cup ==
Round	Date	Opponents	Venue	Result	Score F–A	Scorers	Attendance
Preliminary round	28 November 1989	Aldershot	A	L	0–3		1,148
Preliminary round	12 December 1989	Hereford United	H	W	1–0	Atkins	3,168

== Appearances and goals ==
Numbers in parentheses denote appearances made as a substitute.
Players with name in italics and marked * were on loan from another club for the whole of their season with Birmingham.
Key to positions: GK – Goalkeeper; DF – Defender; MF – Midfielder; FW – Forward

Players' appearances and goals by competition
Pos.	Nat.	Name	League		FA Cup		League Cup		Associate Members' Cup		Total	
Pos.	Nat.	Name	Apps	Goals	Apps	Goals	Apps	Goals	Apps	Goals	Apps	Goals
GK	ENG	Roger Hansbury	1	0	0	0	0	0	0	0	1	0
GK	WAL	Martin Thomas	42	0	4	0	4	0	2	0	52	0
GK	ENG	Dean Williams	3	0	0	0	0	0	0	0	3	0
DF	ENG	Kevin Ashley	31	1	2	0	3	0	1	0	37	1
DF	ENG	Ian Atkins	45	2	4	0	4	2	2	1	55	5
DF	ENG	Ian Clarkson	15 (5)	0	3	0	1	0	2	0	21 (5)	0
DF	ENG	John Frain	36 (2)	1	4	0	2	0	2	0	44 (2)	1
DF	ENG	Trevor Matthewson	46	1	4	0	4	0	2	0	56	1
DF	ENG	Vince Overson	27 (3)	0	3	0	3 (1)	0	1	0	34 (4)	0
DF	ENG	Brian Roberts	9 (1)	0	0	0	0 (1)	0	0 (1)	0	9 (3)	0
DF	ENG	Phil Sproson	12	0	0	0	4	1	0	0	16	1
MF	SCO	Dougie Bell	14 (1)	0	4	0	0	0	2	0	20 (1)	0
MF	ENG	John Deakin	3 (4)	0	0	0	0	0	0 (1)	0	3 (5)	0
MF	ENG	Andy Harris	0 (1)	0	0	0	0	0	0	0	0 (1)	0
MF	ENG	Robert Hopkins	16 (2)	6	0 (2)	0	2 (1)	0	0	0	18 (5)	6
MF	ENG	Kevin Langley	33	0	4	0	1	0	2	0	40	0
MF	ENG	David Madden *	5	1	0	0	0	0	0	0	5	1
MF	ENG	Dean Peer	22 (5)	3	0	0	3 (1)	0	0	0	25 (6)	3
MF	ENG	Mark Rutherford	0 (2)	0	0	0	0	0	0	0	0 (2)	0
MF	ENG	Paul Tait	7 (7)	2	0 (1)	0	1 (1)	0	0 (1)	0	8 (10)	2
FW	ENG	Dennis Bailey	40 (3)	18	4	0	4	2	2	0	50 (3)	20
FW	ENG	Nigel Gleghorn	43	9	4	3	2	0	2	0	51	12
FW	ENG	Colin Gordon	14 (7)	3	0	0	2 (1)	0	0	0	16 (8)	3
FW	ENG	Simon Sturridge	30 (1)	10	4	1	2 (1)	0	1	0	37 (2)	11
FW	ENG	Mark Yates	12 (8)	2	0 (1)	0	2	0	1	0	15 (9)	2

== See also ==
- Birmingham City F.C. seasons

== Sources ==
- Matthews, Tony (1995). Birmingham City: A Complete Record. Derby: Breedon Books. ISBN 978-1-85983-010-9.
- Matthews, Tony (2010). Birmingham City: The Complete Record. Derby: DB Publishing. ISBN 978-1-85983-853-2.
- For match dates, league positions and results: "Birmingham City 1989–1990: Results". Statto Organisation. Archived from the original on 7 April 2011.
- For lineups, appearances, goalscorers and attendances: Matthews (2010), Complete Record, pp. 414–15, 480.
