= Stoke City F.C. Player of the Year =

English football award

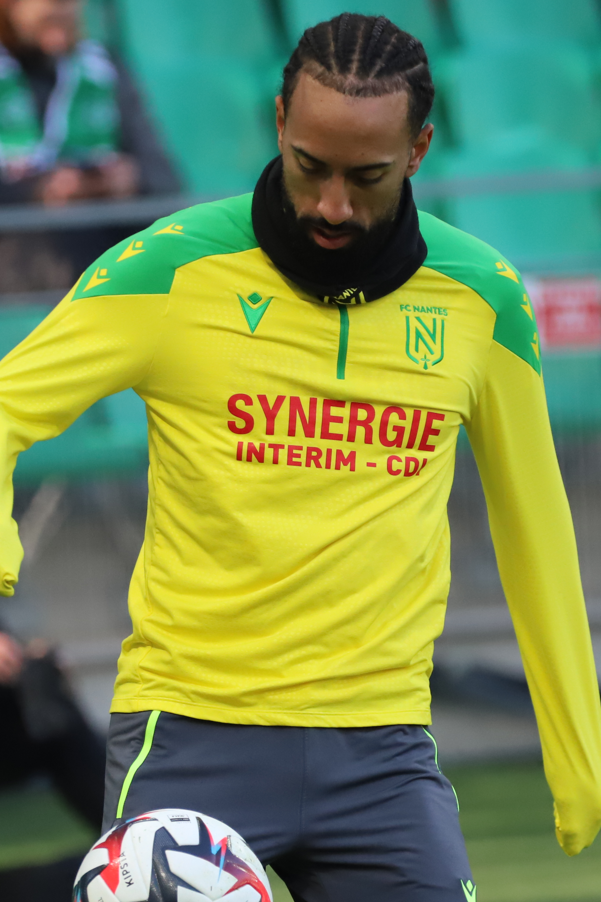
2026 winner, Sorba Thomas

The Stoke City Player of the Year award is an award presented to the Stoke City fans' player of the season. Towards the end of each season, fans are invited to cast their votes for this award. The winner is generally announced at an end-of-season awards dinner at either the bet365 Stadium or the King's Hall in Stoke-on-Trent.

The inaugural award was made to Howard Kendall in 1978. Peter Fox has won the award a record three times, Mickey Thomas and Jack Butland are the only other players to have won the award more than once. There have been 13 different nationalities to have won the award.

== Player of the Year winners ==
Key

- denotes multiple recipients in the same season
- Player (X) denotes the number of times a player has won the award

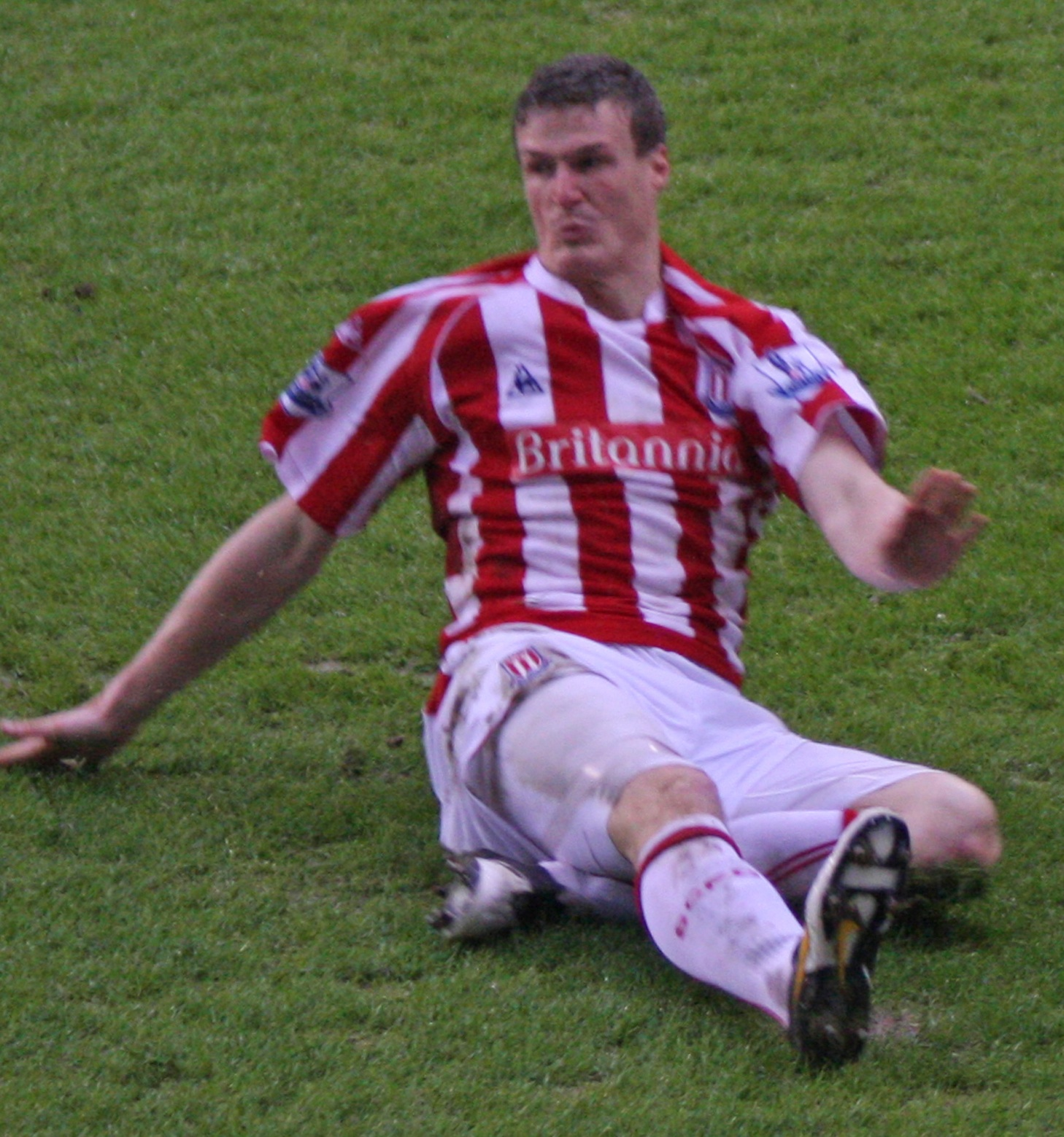
2011 winner Robert Huth.

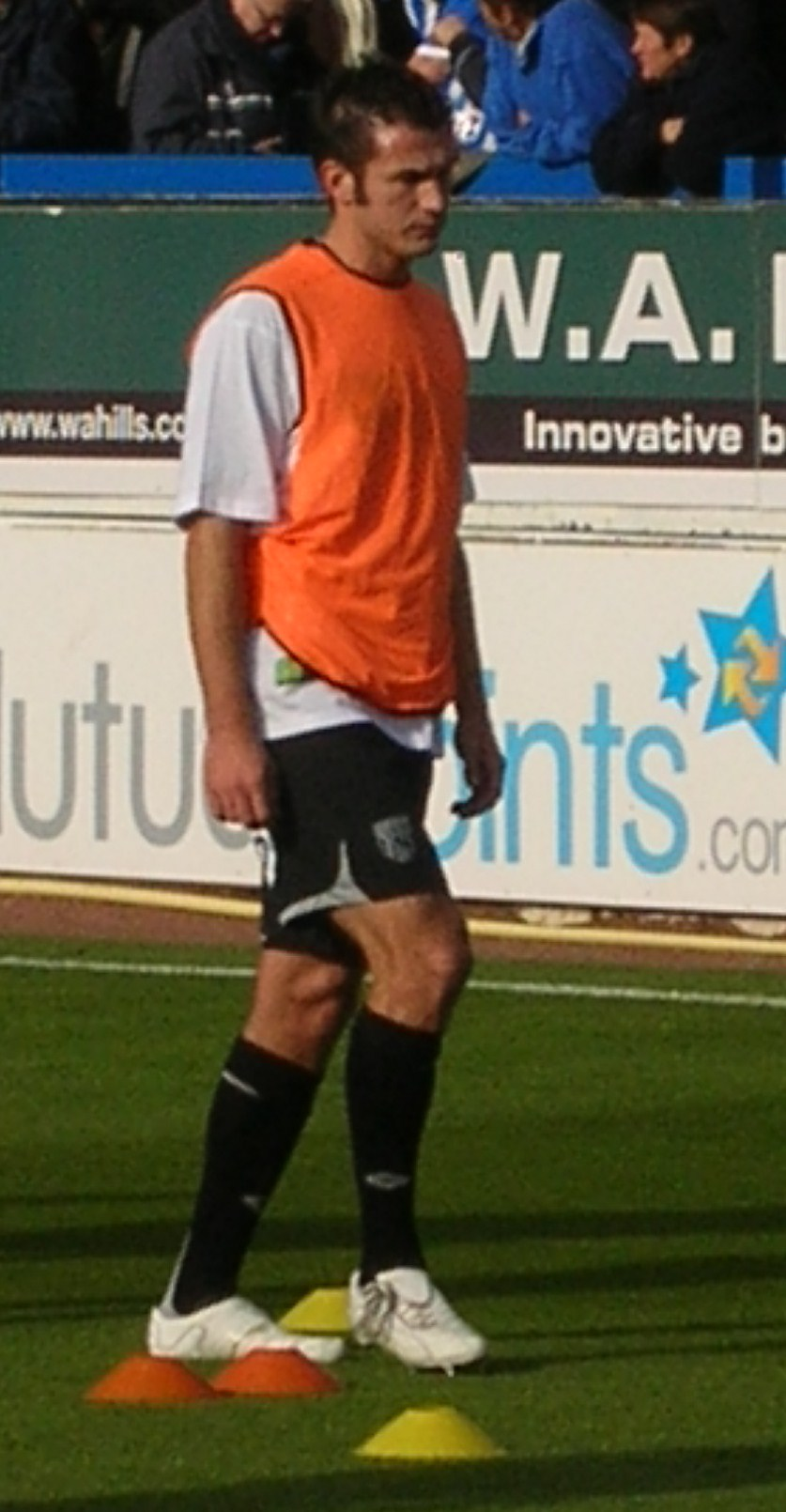
Belgian defender Carl Hoefkens won the 2006 award.

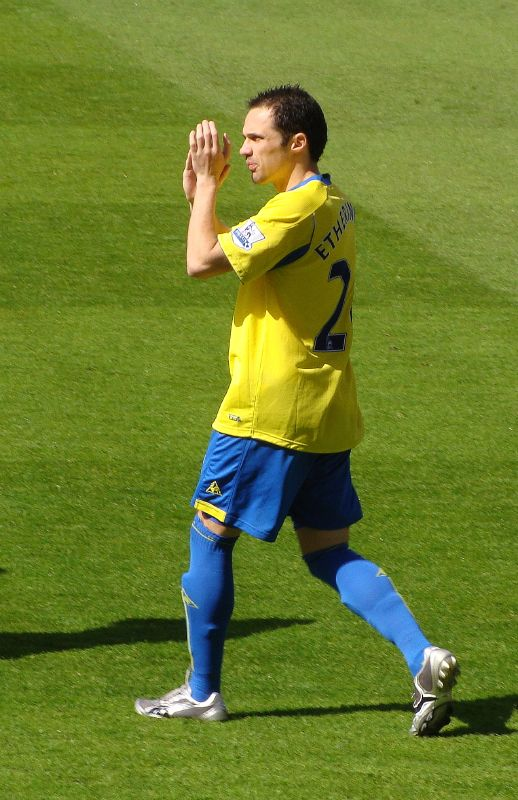
Winger Matthew Etherington won the award in 2010.

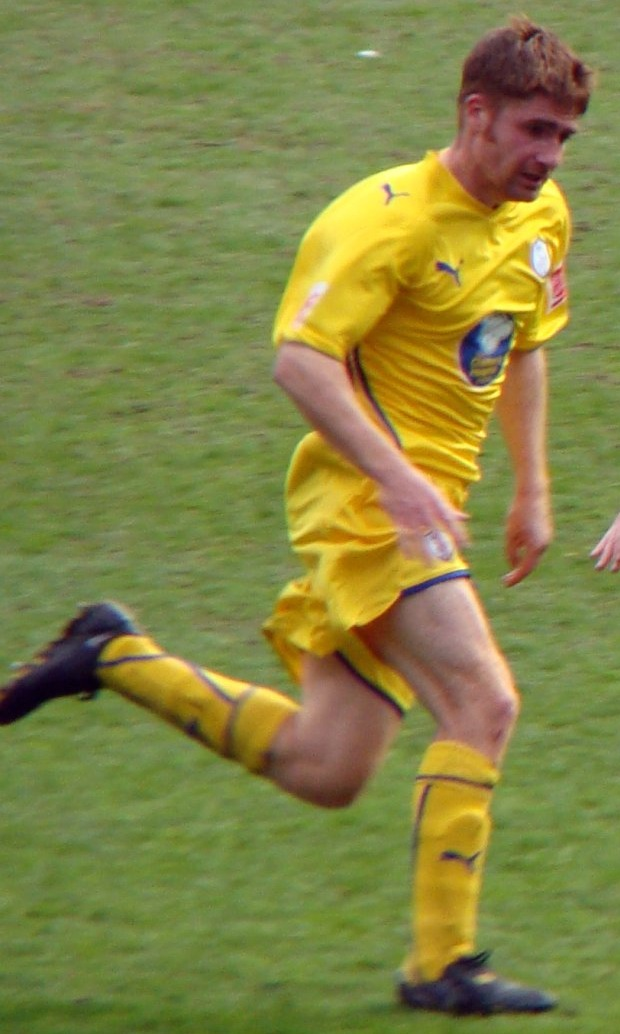
Academy product James O'Connor won the award in 2000.

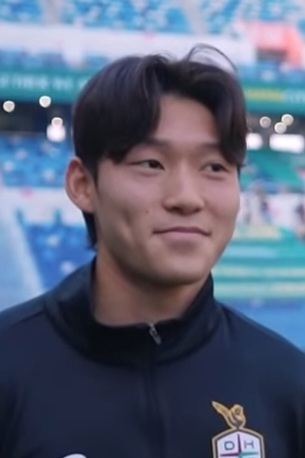
2024 winner, Bae Jun-ho

| Year | Name | Nationality | Position |
|---|---|---|---|
| 1978 | Howard Kendall | England | Midfielder |
| 1979 | Mike Doyle | England | Defender |
| 1980 | Alan Dodd | England | Defender |
| 1981 | Peter Fox | England | Goalkeeper |
| 1982 | Peter Fox (2) | England | Goalkeeper |
| 1983 | Mickey Thomas | Wales | Midfielder |
| 1984 | Steve Bould | England | Defender |
| 1985 | Sammy McIlroy | Northern Ireland | Midfielder |
| 1986 | Keith Bertschin | England | Forward |
| 1987 | Lee Dixon | England | Defender |
| 1988 | Steve Parkin | England | Defender |
| 1989 | Chris Kamara | England | Defender |
| 1990 | Peter Fox (3) | England | Goalkeeper |
| 1991 | Mickey Thomas (2) | Wales | Midfielder |
| 1992 | Wayne Biggins | England | Forward |
| 1993 | Mark Stein | South Africa | Forward |
| 1994 | Ian Cranson | England | Midfielder |
| 1995 | Lárus Sigurðsson | Iceland | Defender |
| 1996^{†} | Mark Prudhoe | England | Goalkeeper |
| 1996^{†} | Ray Wallace | England | Defender |
| 1997 | Andy Griffin | England | Defender |
| 1998 | Justin Whittle | England | Defender |
| 1999 | Kevin Keen | England | Midfielder |
| 2000 | James O'Connor | Republic of Ireland | Midfielder |
| 2001 | Brynjar Gunnarsson | Iceland | Midfielder |
| 2002 | Wayne Thomas | England | Defender |
| 2003 | Sergei Shtanuk | Belarus | Defender |
| 2004 | Ade Akinbiyi | Nigeria | Forward |
| 2005 | Clint Hill | England | Defender |
| 2006 | Carl Hoefkens | Belgium | Defender |
| 2007 | Danny Higginbotham | Gibraltar | Defender |
| 2008 | Liam Lawrence | Republic of Ireland | Midfielder |
| 2009 | Abdoulaye Faye | Senegal | Defender |
| 2010 | Matthew Etherington | England | Midfielder |
| 2011 | Robert Huth | Germany | Defender |
| 2012 | Peter Crouch | England | Forward |
| 2013 | Asmir Begović | Bosnia and Herzegovina | Goalkeeper |
| 2014 | Ryan Shawcross | England | Defender |
| 2015 | Steven Nzonzi | France | Midfielder |
| 2016 | Jack Butland | England | Goalkeeper |
| 2017 | Lee Grant | England | Goalkeeper |
| 2018 | Joe Allen | Wales | Midfielder |
| 2019 | Jack Butland (2) | England | Goalkeeper |
| 2020 | James McClean | Republic of Ireland | Midfielder |
| 2021 | Nick Powell | England | Midfielder |
| 2022 | Jacob Brown | Scotland | Forward |
| 2023 | Ben Wilmot | England | Defender |
| 2024 | Bae Jun-ho | South Korea | Midfielder |
| 2025 | Viktor Johansson | Sweden | Goalkeeper |
| 2026 | Sorba Thomas | Wales | Midfielder |

=== Wins by playing position ===
| Position | Number of winners |
|---|---|
| Goalkeeper | 9 |
| Defender | 19 |
| Midfielder | 16 |
| Forward | 6 |

=== Wins by nationality ===
| Nationality | Number of winners |
|---|---|
| England | 28 |
| Wales | 4 |
| Republic of Ireland | 3 |
| Iceland | 2 |
| Belarus | 1 |
| Belgium | 1 |
| Bosnia and Herzegovina | 1 |
| France | 1 |
| Germany | 1 |
| Gibraltar | 1 |
| Nigeria | 1 |
| Northern Ireland | 1 |
| Senegal | 1 |
| Scotland | 1 |
| South Africa | 1 |
| South Korea | 1 |
| Sweden | 1 |
