= Ray Wallace (footballer) =

English footballer

Personal information
- Full name: Raymond George Wallace
- Date of birth: 2 October 1969 (age 57)
- Place of birth: Lewisham, England
- Height: 5 ft 6 in (1.68 m)
- Position: Full back

Youth career
- 1986–1988: Southampton

Senior career*
Years	Team	Apps	(Gls)
1988–1991	Southampton	35	(0)
1991–1994	Leeds United	7	(0)
1992	→ Swansea City (loan)	2	(0)
1994	→ Reading (loan)	3	(0)
1994–1999	Stoke City	179	(15)
1994–1995	→ Hull City (loan)	7	(0)
1999	Airdrieonians	1	(0)
1999	Altrincham	1	(0)
1999	Winsford United		
2000	Drogheda United	5	(0)
2001–2002	Witton Albion		

International career
1989	England U21	4	(0)
- * Club domestic league appearances and goals

Raymond George Wallace (born 2 October 1969 in Lewisham) is an English former footballer who played in the Football League and Premier League for Southampton, Leeds United, Swansea City, Reading, Stoke City and Hull City, in the Scottish Football League for Airdrieonians, and in the League of Ireland for Drogheda United. He was capped for the England under-21 team.

== Playing career ==
=== Southampton ===
Wallace signed for Southampton Football Club as an apprentice in 1986 along with his twin brother Rod. Elder brother Danny had already become an established member of the Southampton first team. In the early part of his career Wallace was regarded as promising talent, if slightly lightweight, playing as right fullback or right defensive midfield.

On 22 October 1988, he made his Southampton debut, replacing Gerry Forrest at The Dell against Sheffield Wednesday alongside his two brothers; this was the first time three brothers had played in the same team in the Football League First Division for 67 years. He was a virtual ever-present until September 1989, when he lost his place to Jason Dodd through suspension, after which he played only once more for the Saints. While a Southampton player, he won four caps for the England under-21 team.

=== Leeds United ===
In May 1991, Leeds United signed Wallace and twin brother Rod in the same transaction, with Wallace being valued at £100,000. Rod formed a successful strike partnership with Lee Chapman, but Ray made only seven appearances for the club, and spent time on loan to Swansea City and Reading.

=== Stoke City ===
In August 1994 Wallace joined Stoke City on a free transfer. He made a slow start to his Stoke career and by December 1994 he was loaned out to Second Division Hull City where he made seven appearances. He returned to the Victoria Ground in January 1995 and ended the 1994–95 season with 28 appearances. Manager Lou Macari used Wallace in a different role in 1995–96 playing him alongside Nigel Gleghorn in centre midfield. It worked well as Stoke reached the play-offs where they lost 1–0 to Leicester City and Wallace won the player of the year award jointly with goalkeeper Mark Prudhoe. He missed just one match in 1996–97 as Stoke finished in a mid-table position of 12th. The 1997–98 season saw Stoke play at the new Britannia Stadium but results were poor and relegation to the third tier was suffered. Under Brian Little in 1998–99 Wallace was used mainly as a substitute and was released by the club at the end of the season.

=== Later career ===
He went on to play for clubs including Airdrieonians (one game in the Scottish First Division), Altrincham (one game in the Conference, in which he was brought down for a penalty from which Altrincham scored the only goal of the game), Winsford United, League of Ireland club Drogheda United, and Witton Albion.

== Career statistics ==
Appearances and goals by club, season and competition
Club	Season	League			FA Cup		League Cup		Other		Total	
Club	Season	Division	Apps	Goals	Apps	Goals	Apps	Goals	Apps	Goals	Apps	Goals
Southampton	1988–89	First Division	26	0	1	0	5	0	2 (Note: Appearances in Full Members' Cup)	0	34	0
Southampton	1989–90	First Division	9	0	1	0	2	0	0	0	12	0
Southampton	1990–91	First Division	0	0	0	0	1	0	0	0	1	0
Southampton	Total		35	0	2	0	8	0	2	0	47	0
Leeds United	1991–92	First Division	0	0	0	0	0	0	0	0	0	0
Leeds United	1992–93	Premier League	6	0	0	0	0	0	0	0	6	0
Leeds United	1993–94	Premier League	1	0	0	0	0	0	0	0	1	0
Leeds United	Total		7	0	0	0	0	0	0	0	7	0
Swansea City (loan)	1991–92	Third Division	2	0	0	0	0	0	0	0	2	0
Reading (loan)	1993–94	Second Division	3	0	0	0	0	0	0	0	3	0
Stoke City	1994–95	First Division	20	1	1	0	1	0	6 (Note: Appearances in Anglo-Italian Cup)	0	28	1
Stoke City	1995–96	First Division	44	6	2	0	3	0	5 (Note: Two appearances and goal in First Division play-offs and three appearances in Anglo-Italian Cup)	1	54	7
Stoke City	1996–97	First Division	45	2	1	0	4	0	—		50	2
Stoke City	1997–98	First Division	39	3	1	0	5	0	—		45	3
Stoke City	1998–99	Second Division	31	3	1	0	1	0	1 (Note: Appearance in Football League Trophy)	0	34	3
Stoke City	Total		179	15	6	0	14	0	12	1	211	16
Hull City (loan)	1994–95	Second Division	7	0	0	0	0	0	0	0	7	0
Airdrieonians	1999–2000	Scottish First Division	1	0	0	0	0	0	0	0	1	0
Altrincham	1999–2000	Football Conference	1	0	0	0	0	0	0	0	1	0
Career total			235	15	8	0	22	0	14	1	279	16

== Honours ==
Stoke City

- Stoke City player of the year: 1996
