= Ian Clarkson =

English footballer (born 1970)

Personal information
- Full name: Ian Stewart Clarkson
- Date of birth: 4 December 1970 (age 55)
- Place of birth: Solihull, England
- Position: Defender

Youth career
- 1987–1988: Birmingham City

Senior career*
Years	Team	Apps	(Gls)
1988–1993	Birmingham City	136	(0)
1993–1996	Stoke City	75	(0)
1996–1999	Northampton Town	94	(1)
1999–2002	Kidderminster Harriers	105	(0)
2002	Nuneaton Borough	12	(0)
2002	Stafford Rangers		
2003	Leamington		
2003	Forest Green Rovers		
2012–	Alvechurch		
Total		422	(1)

Managerial career
- 2002: Kidderminster Harriers (player/assistant caretaker manager)
- * Club domestic league appearances and goals

Ian Stewart Clarkson (born 4 December 1970) is an English former professional footballer who made nearly 400 appearances in the Football League playing as a defender for Birmingham City, Stoke City, Northampton Town and Kidderminster Harriers.

== Playing career ==
Ian Clarkson was born in Solihull, West Midlands. He began his football career as a YTS trainee with Birmingham City, the club he had supported since childhood, in 1987. He made his first team debut as a 17-year-old in the League Cup against Aston Villa in September 1988, and his Football League debut a few days later. He signed his first professional contract in December 1988. In 1991, he played in Birmingham's winning side in the Associate Members' Cup final at Wembley. The following season, he captained the side to promotion from the Third Division while still only 21, an achievement which he considers to be the highlight of his career.

Former Birmingham manager Lou Macari brought Clarkson to First Division side Stoke City in September 1993 for a fee of £40,000. He spent three seasons at Stoke, and played in the First Division play-offs, in which Stoke lost to Martin O'Neill's Leicester City side in the 1996 semi-final. When his contract expired he rejected Stoke's offer of renewal terms, and left for Third Division side Northampton Town.

At Northampton, he linked up with former Birmingham City teammates John Gayle, Dean Peer and manager Ian Atkins, soon to be joined by John Frain. In his first season, he helped them to promotion via the play-offs, and the next year played in the Second Division play-off final, but lost 1–0 to Grimsby Town. In August 1998, he suffered a badly broken tibia in a match against Lincoln City. Though he made a couple of appearances for Northampton at the start of the 1999–2000 season, it appeared that he was no longer fit enough to compete at that level, and that his league career was over at the age of 28.

Clarkson went to train at Kidderminster Harriers, which was then a Conference club, and regained sufficient fitness to be able to play regularly at that level. Kidderminster made him club captain, and of his first 30 games for the club they lost only one; at the end of the season the club were promoted to the Football League as Conference champions. They repaid the insurance payout that Clarkson had received on his retirement due to injury, so that he was able to play for them in the Football League. When Jan Molby resigned as manager of Kidderminster in March 2002, Clarkson acted as assistant to caretaker manager Ian Britton. The club released him at the end of that season for financial reasons. He joined Nuneaton Borough of the Conference, and was released in December again on financial grounds. He then registered for short periods with Stafford Rangers, Leamington and, from March 2003, Forest Green Rovers, finally retiring at the end of the season.

In 2012, he returned to football to sign for Alvechurch in September 2012 at the age of 41.

== Life after football ==
Clarkson qualified as a coach and coach educator, and worked for Birmingham City's Football in the Community programme. During the later years of his playing career he was keen to get involved in media work; from 2002 he was employed as a football reporter and journalist by the Birmingham Post and Sunday Mercury newspapers and by the Professional Footballers' Association (PFA)'s website. In 2006, he was appointed to manage a scheme designed to involve young people in sport and physical activity, as part of a wider programme of regeneration of the deprived areas of North Solihull. Clarkson now works as a PE Teacher at Repton Prep School in Derbyshire, where he has been based since 2010.

== Personal life ==
Clarkson's nephew is the Wrexham AFC midfielder Callum O'Hare.

== Career statistics ==
Appearances and goals by club, season and competition
Club	Season	League			FA Cup		League Cup		Other (Note: Includes Anglo-Italian Cup, Football League Trophy and Football League play-offs)		Total	
Club	Season	Division	Apps	Goals	Apps	Goals	Apps	Goals	Apps	Goals	Apps	Goals
Birmingham City	1988–89	Second Division	9	0	0	0	2	0	0	0	11	0
Birmingham City	1989–90	Third Division	20	0	3	0	1	0	2	0	26	0
Birmingham City	1990–91	Third Division	37	0	1	0	0	0	8	0	46	0
Birmingham City	1991–92	Third Division	42	0	1	0	7	0	2	0	52	0
Birmingham City	1992–93	First Division	28	0	1	0	2	0	5	0	36	0
Birmingham City	1993–94	First Division	0	0	0	0	0	0	1	0	1	0
Birmingham City	Total		136	0	6	0	12	0	20	0	174	0
Stoke City	1993–94	First Division	14	0	1	0	2	0	2	0	19	0
Stoke City	1994–95	First Division	18	0	2	0	1	0	4	0	25	0
Stoke City	1995–96	First Division	43	0	2	0	3	0	4	0	52	0
Stoke City	Total		75	0	5	0	6	0	10	0	96	0
Northampton Town	1996–97	Third Division	45	0	1	0	4	0	6	0	56	0
Northampton Town	1997–98	Second Division	42	1	5	0	2	0	4	1	53	2
Northampton Town	1998–99	Second Division	5	0	0	0	2	0	0	0	7	0
Northampton Town	1999–2000	Third Division	2	0	0	0	1	0	0	0	3	0
Northampton Town	Total		94	1	6	0	9	0	10	1	119	2
Kidderminster Harriers	1999–2000	Conference National	28	0	0	0	0	0	0	0	28	0
Kidderminster Harriers	2000–01	Third Division	38	0	3	0	2	0	1	0	44	0
Kidderminster Harriers	2001–02	Third Division	39	0	1	0	0	0	2	0	42	0
Kidderminster Harriers	Total		105	0	4	0	2	0	3	0	114	0
Nuneaton Borough	2002–03	Conference National	12	0	0	0	0	0	0	0	12	0
Career total			422	1	21	0	29	0	43	1	515	2

== Honours ==
Birmingham City

- Associate Members' Cup: 1990–91
- Football League Third Division runner-up: 1991–92

Northampton Town

- Football League Third Division play-offs: 1997

Kidderminster Harriers

- Conference National: 1999–2000
