= Steve Leslie =

Steve Leslie may refer to:

- Steve Leslie (footballer, born 1952), English footballer (Colchester United)
- Steve Leslie (footballer, born 1976), Scottish footballer (Stoke City, Queen of the South)
- Steve Leslie (footballer, born 1987), Scottish footballer (Shrewsbury Town)
