= Kevin Keen =

English footballer (born 1967)

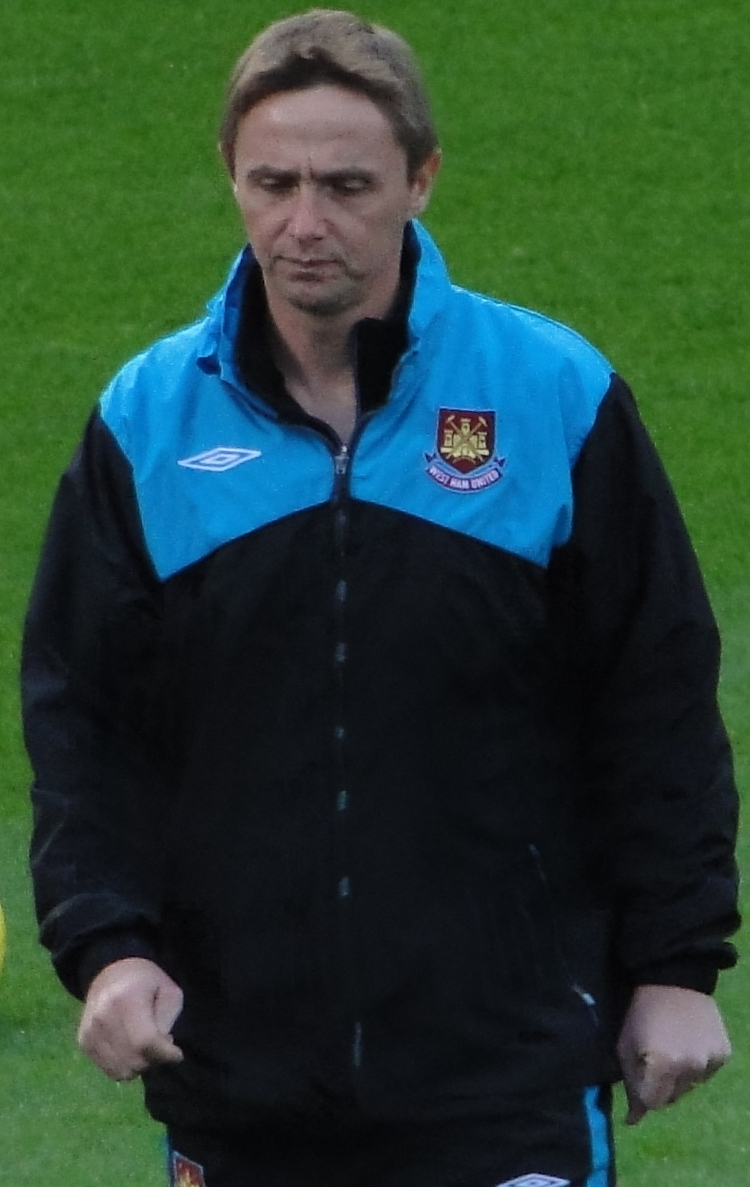
- Keen as West Ham United coach in 2009

Personal information
- Full name: Kevin Ian Keen
- Date of birth: 25 February 1967 (age 59)
- Place of birth: Amersham, England
- Height: 5 ft 6 in (1.68 m)
- Position: Midfielder

Senior career*
Years	Team	Apps	(Gls)
1982–1983	Wycombe Wanderers	3	(0)
1983–1993	West Ham United	219	(21)
1993–1994	Wolverhampton Wanderers	42	(7)
1994–2000	Stoke City	176	(10)
2000–2002	Macclesfield Town	62	(2)
Total		502	(40)

International career
1982	England Schoolboys		
1983–1984	England U17	11	(0)
1984–1985	England Youth	7	(1)

Managerial career
- 2001: Macclesfield Town (caretaker)
- 2006: West Ham United (caretaker)
- 2008: West Ham United (caretaker)
- 2011: West Ham United (caretaker)
- 2015–2016: Colchester United
- * Club domestic league appearances and goals

Kevin Ian Keen (born 25 February 1967) is an English football coach and former player. Keen is currently the coach of West Ham United under-18 team.

Keen began his career with Wycombe Wanderers before joining West Ham United in 1983. He spent seven seasons with the "Hammers" twice gaining promotion and twice suffering relegation. He left for Wolverhampton Wanderers in 1993 before joining Stoke City in October 1994. He helped Stoke reach the play-offs in 1995–96 losing out to Leicester City. Stoke then made the move to the Britannia Stadium but were relegated to Division Two in 1998. He spent two more seasons at Stoke helping the club again reach the play-offs and win the Football League Trophy in 2000. He then spent two seasons with Macclesfield Town during which time he had a spell as caretaker manager.

After three spells as caretaker manager at West Ham, Keen left the club in July 2011 to take up the role of first team coach at Liverpool, where he would be reunited with old West Ham colleague Steve Clarke. He remained in this post until June 2012 leaving on the appointment of new manager Brendan Rodgers. In July 2012 he was again reunited with Clarke when he was appointed joint assistant head coach at West Bromwich Albion, and his next job was assistant manager at Reading. He managed League One club Colchester United between December 2015 and April 2016, but left the club after failing to avoid relegation to League Two. He joined Crystal Palace's coaching staff in July 2016.

== Playing career ==
=== Early career ===
Keen is the son of former professional footballer Mike Keen who played in midfield for Luton Town, Watford and Queens Park Rangers. He attended the John Hampden Grammar School, High Wycombe and was a member of the High Wycombe U15 team that won the English Schools Trophy in 1981 and won several England schoolboy caps. A year later, Keen became the youngest ever player to appear in a first-team game for Isthmian League side Wycombe Wanderers, making his debut at 15 years and 209 days, in September 1982. He played three games for Wycombe before joining West Ham United as a 16-year-old apprentice.

=== West Ham United ===
Keen joined West Ham as an apprentice in 1983 and signed professional forms a year later in March 1984. He helped the reserve side to win the Combination League and won 15 England Youth caps. He made his debut as a substitute for Geoff Pike in a 5–2 home defeat against Liverpool in September 1986. He made 17 league and cup appearances in the 1986–87 as West Ham finished 15th in the First Division table. This season saw his first West Ham goal, in a 4–1 home win against Leyton Orient Orient in the 3rd round of the FA Cup on 31 January 1987. He made another 25 appearances in the 1987–88 season and 33 appearances in the 1988–89 season as West Ham reached the semi-finals of the League Cup and were relegated to the Second Division. A change of West Ham manager from Lou Macari to Billy Bonds saw him become almost ever present in the 1989–90 season, making 57 league and cup appearances and scoring 13 goals, as West Ham finished seventh in the table and again reach the semi-finals of the League Cup. He made 51 appearances in the 1990–91 season helping West Ham to promotion to the First Division and to the semi-finals of the FA Cup, and 39 appearances in 1991–92 as West Ham were relegated once more. The 1992–93 season saw his best form as he played in every league and cup game, making 56 appearances, as West Ham were promoted. His final game for West Ham was the 2–0 home win over Cambridge United in May 1993 that clinched promotion to the newly created Premiership. He was runner-up in the Hammer of the Year award for 1993. Due for a contract renewal, a poor offer by West Ham and manager Bonds after what Keen considered to be a good season for him at West Ham, saw him drop down a division and join Wolverhampton Wanderers.

=== Wolverhampton Wanderers ===
Keen joined Wolves for a fee of £600,000 in July 1993, where he made 50 appearances in the 1993–94 season, scoring nine goals, and helping Wolves to seventh place in the table. A year later, he was on the move again and joined up with former West Ham manager, Lou Macari, at Stoke City.

=== Stoke City ===
Keen joined Stoke City in October 1994 for a fee of £300,000. He marked his arrival at Stoke by scoring against his old club Wolves in his second match for the club. He formed a decent midfielder partnership with Ray Wallace as Stoke made a push for promotion to the Premier League in 1995–96 season. Unfortunately for Keen he picked up an injury against Luton Town in April 1996 and he missed the rest of the season. Stoke made the end of season play-offs and lost out 1–0 to Leicester City. He struggled for starts in 1996–97 as he recovered from his injury but was a regular in 1997–98 in what was Stoke's first season at the Britannia Stadium. He scored the winning goal in the first Potteries derby at the new stadium but it was a terrible season for Stoke as they finished in 23rd position and were relegated to Division Two. He played in 49 of the club's 52 fixtures in 1998–99 as Stoke failed to mount a consistent promotion challenge under Brian Little. He spent one more season at Stoke before leaving for Macclesfield Town.

=== Macclesfield Town ===
Keen joined Macclesfield Town on a free transfer and made his debut in a 3–1 home defeat to Middlesbrough in the 3rd round of the League Cup in September 2000. He made 71 league and cup appearances, including a 3rd round tie at home in the FA Cup against former club West Ham in January 2002, which West Ham won 3–0. Keen also had a brief spell as caretaker manager of the club for one month following manager Gil Prescott's decision to concentrate on a role as director of football in October 2001. He was released in 2002 after his contract was not renewed and returned to West Ham in a coaching role.

== Coaching career ==
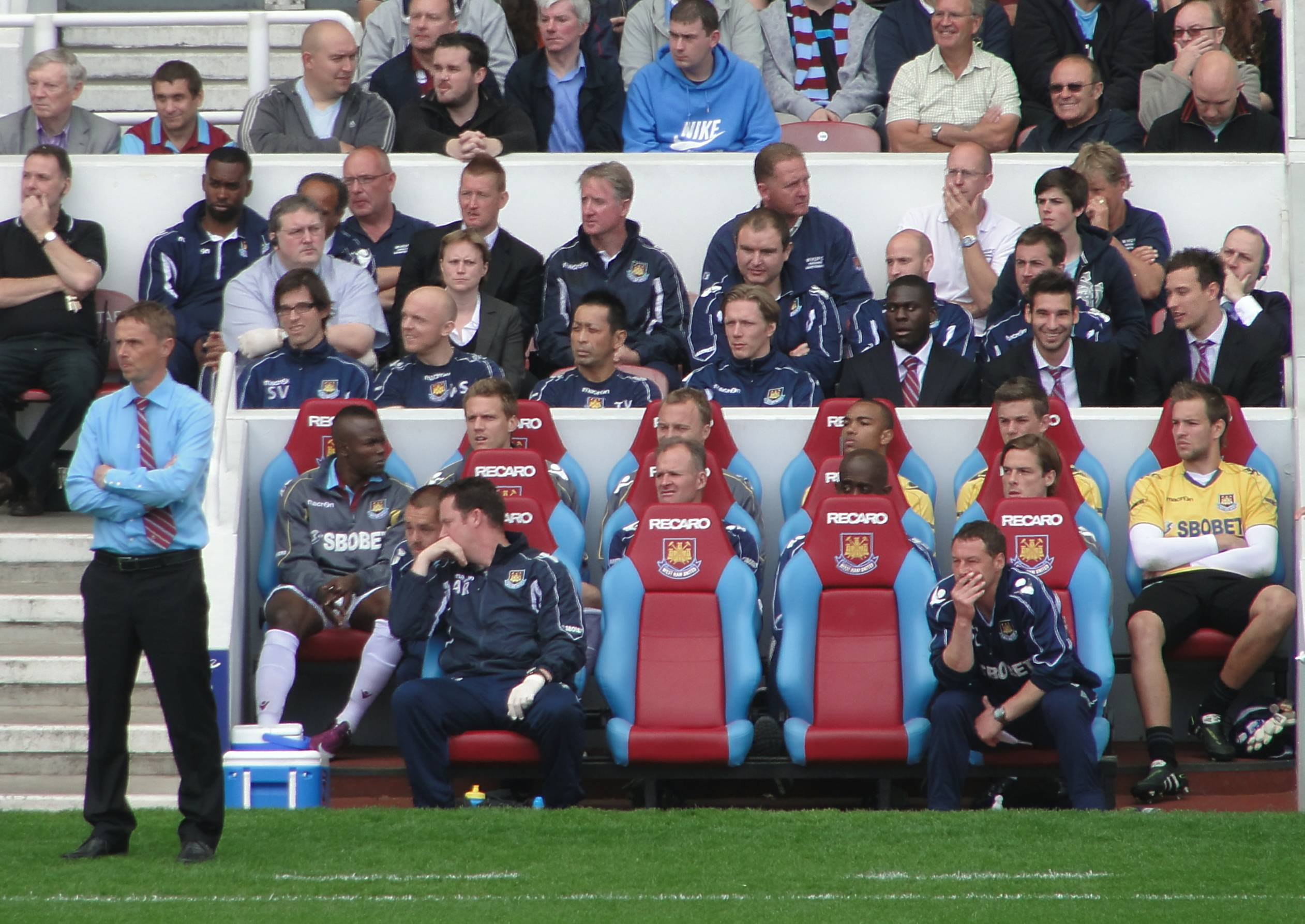
Keen as caretaker-manager of West Ham, May 2011

Keen rejoined West Ham in July 2002 as under-17 academy coach. He was later appointed reserve team coach and became first-team coach in October 2006. Following the sacking of manager Alan Pardew in December 2006, he was very briefly placed in temporary charge of first-team affairs until Alan Curbishley was appointed two days later. He reverted to his previous role as reserve team coach when Glynn Snodin was appointed as first-team coach in June 2007. He was formally announced as caretaker manager on 3 September 2008 after the resignation of manager Alan Curbishley. Keen took charge of West Ham for one game only; a 3–2 away defeat to West Bromwich on 13 September 2008 before handing over the manager's role to Gianfranco Zola. Keen was appointed again as caretaker-manager of West Ham, for their last game of the 2010–11 season, following the sacking of their previous manager, Avram Grant on 15 May 2011.

On 3 July 2011, Keen left West Ham to join Liverpool as first-team coach in the backroom team under Kenny Dalglish. On 8 June 2012, it was confirmed that Keen had left Liverpool after the arrival of Brendan Rodgers as manager. On 3 July 2012 it was announced Keen had joined West Bromwich Albion as joint assistant head coach. On 14 December 2013 it was announced that Kevin Keen had been sacked along with head coach Steve Clarke. In July 2014, Keen began work as Head of Coaching and Under-18s Manager at Fulham. On 20 December 2014 he was appointed assistant manager to Steve Clarke at Reading. Keen was sacked alongside Clarke on 4 December 2015.

After leaving his managerial role at Colchester United, Keen returned to coaching by joining Crystal Palace in July 2016.

In February 2018, Keen joined Southend United as an assistant manager to Chris Powell.

In June 2019, Keen returned to West Ham as coach to their under-18 team.

== Managerial career ==
Keen was handed his first permanent managerial position on 21 December 2015 when he was named Tony Humes' successor at League One club Colchester United. Keen's first match in charge was the Boxing Day Essex derby against Southend United. His side, already on a seven-game losing run, were defeated 2–0. He earned his first win as Colchester manager on 9 January 2016 against Championship opposition as his side defeated Charlton Athletic 2–1 in the FA Cup third round.

Following a winless league run of 19 League One games stretching back to October 2015, Keen oversaw his first league victory for Colchester on 1 March 2016 as they defeated Bradford City 2–1 at Valley Parade courtesy of two Darren Ambrose goals. He was nominated for the League One 'Manager of the Month' award for March after improving Colchester's fortunes, but lost out to Barnsley caretaker manager Paul Heckingbottom.

Despite Keen leading his side to a late season upturn in form, Colchester were relegated to the fourth tier of English football for the first time in 18-years after suffering a 3–0 home defeat to Burton Albion on 23 April 2016. He departed the club by mutual consent three days later.

== Career statistics ==
Appearances and goals by club, season and competition
Club	Season	League			FA Cup		League Cup		Other		Total	
Club	Season	Division	Apps	Goals	Apps	Goals	Apps	Goals	Apps	Goals	Apps	Goals
Wycombe Wanderers	1982–83	Isthmian League	3	0	0	0	—		0	0	3	0
West Ham United	1986–87	First Division	13	0	2	1	2	0	1 (Note: Appearances in Full Members' Cup)	0	18	1
West Ham United	1987–88	First Division	23	1	0	0	1	1	1	0	25	2
West Ham United	1988–89	First Division	24	3	5	0	2	1	2	0	33	4
West Ham United	1989–90	Second Division	44	10	1	0	10	1	2	2	57	13
West Ham United	1990–91	Second Division	40	0	7	0	3	1	1	1	51	2
West Ham United	1991–92	First Division	29	0	5	0	2	1	3	0	39	1
West Ham United	1992–93	First Division	46	7	2	0	2	0	6 (Note: Appearances in Anglo-Italian Cup)	0	56	7
West Ham United	Total		219	21	22	1	22	5	16	3	279	30
Wolverhampton Wanderers	1993–94	First Division	41	7	5	1	2	0	2	1	50	9
Wolverhampton Wanderers	1994–95	First Division	1	0	0	0	1	0	2	0	4	0
Wolverhampton Wanderers	Total		42	7	5	1	3	0	4	1	54	9
Stoke City	1994–95	First Division	21	2	0	0	0	0	0	0	21	2
Stoke City	1995–96	First Division	33	3	2	0	2	0	2	0	39	3
Stoke City	1996–97	First Division	16	1	0	0	4	0	—		20	1
Stoke City	1997–98	First Division	40	1	1	0	5	1	—		46	2
Stoke City	1998–99	Second Division	44	2	2	0	1	0	2 (Note: Appearances in Football League Trophy)	0	49	2
Stoke City	1999–2000	Second Division	23	1	1	0	4	1	0	0	28	2
Stoke City	Total		177	10	6	0	16	2	4	0	203	12
Macclesfield Town	2000–01	Third Division	32	2	1	0	2	0	0	0	35	2
Macclesfield Town	2001–02	Third Division	30	0	4	1	1	0	1	0	36	1
Macclesfield Town	Total		62	2	5	1	3	0	1	0	71	3
Career total			503	40	38	3	44	7	25	4	610	54

== Managerial statistics ==
As of 26 April 2016

Managerial record by team and tenure
Team	From	To	Record				
Team	From	To	P	W	D	L	Win %
Macclesfield Town	11 October 2001	12 November 2001	7	1	1	5	14.3
West Ham United	3 September 2008	15 September 2008	1	0	0	1	0.0
West Ham United	16 May 2011	1 June 2011	1	0	0	1	0.0
Colchester United	21 December 2015	26 April 2016	24	5	7	12	20.8
Total			33	6	8	19	18.2

== Honours ==
West Ham United

- Football League Second Division runner-up: 1990–91, 1992–93

Stoke City

- Football League Trophy: 2000

Individual

- Stoke City player of the year: 1999
