= Simon Sturridge =

English footballer

Personal information
- Full name: Simon Andrew Sturridge
- Date of birth: 9 December 1969 (age 56)
- Place of birth: Birmingham, England
- Position: Striker

Youth career
- 1985–1988: Birmingham City

Senior career*
Years	Team	Apps	(Gls)
1988–1993	Birmingham City	150	(30)
1993–1999	Stoke City	71	(14)
1999	→ Blackpool (loan)	5	(1)
1999–2000	Northampton Town	18	(1)
2000	→ Shrewsbury Town (loan)	11	(1)
Total		255	(47)
- * Club domestic league appearances and goals

Simon Andrew Sturridge (born 9 December 1969) is an English former professional footballer who played as a striker. He made more than 250 appearances in the Football League for Birmingham City, Stoke City, Blackpool, Northampton Town and Shrewsbury Town.

== Career ==
Sturridge was born in Birmingham and joined home-town club Birmingham City as a trainee in 1985 and turned professional in 1988. He played 186 games in all competitions for the club and scored the first goal of the 1991 Football League Trophy Final in which Birmingham beat Tranmere Rovers 3–2. After helping Birmingham gain promotion 1991–92 he joined Stoke City in September 1993.

Sturridge had to wait before he could become a regular in the Stoke first team as he made 20 appearances in 1993–94 of which he started nine and played in just 11 matches in 1994–95 meaning that he was rarely seen at the Victoria Ground. However his fortunes improved considerably in 1995–96 after manager Lou Macari brought in Mike Sheron and played him alongside Sturridge. The pair scored a combined 29 goals which saw Stoke reach the play-offs where they lost 1–0 to Leicester City. He suffered a serious injury at the start of the 1996–97 and after making fleeting appearances in the next two years he left for Northampton Town, having spent a short time out on loan at Blackpool. He played 19 times for the Cobblers helping them gain promotion in 1999–2000 and ended his career with an 11-game spell on loan at Shrewsbury Town.

== Personal life ==
He is the brother of footballer Dean Sturridge and the uncle of footballer Daniel Sturridge, and is of Jamaican descent.

== Career statistics ==
Appearances and goals by club, season and competition
Club	Season	League			FA Cup		League Cup		Other (Note: Appearances and goals in the Anglo-Italian Cup, Football League Trophy, Football League play-offs and Full Members Cup)		Total	
Club	Season	Division	Apps	Goals	Apps	Goals	Apps	Goals	Apps	Goals	Apps	Goals
Birmingham City	1988–89	Second Division	21	3	0	0	1	0	1	0	23	3
Birmingham City	1989–90	Third Division	31	10	4	1	3	0	1	0	39	11
Birmingham City	1990–91	Third Division	38	6	2	1	2	0	8	3	50	10
Birmingham City	1991–92	Third Division	40	10	1	0	7	1	0	0	48	11
Birmingham City	1992–93	First Division	20	1	1	0	1	0	4	2	26	3
Birmingham City	Total		150	30	8	2	14	1	14	5	186	38
Stoke City	1993–94	First Division	13	0	3	0	1	0	3	0	20	0
Stoke City	1994–95	First Division	8	1	1	0	0	0	2	0	11	1
Stoke City	1995–96	First Division	41	12	2	1	1	0	4	0	48	13
Stoke City	1996–97	First Division	5	0	0	0	0	0	0	0	5	0
Stoke City	1997–98	First Division	1	0	0	0	1	0	0	0	2	0
Stoke City	1998–99	Second Division	3	0	1	0	1	0	1	0	6	0
Stoke City	Total		71	13	7	1	4	0	10	0	92	14
Blackpool (loan)	1998–99	Second Division	5	1	0	0	0	0	0	0	5	1
Northampton Town	1999–2000	Third Division	18	1	1	0	0	0	0	0	19	1
Shrewsbury Town (loan)	1999–2000	Third Division	11	1	0	0	0	0	0	0	11	1
Career Total			255	47	16	3	18	1	24	5	313	56

== Honours ==
Birmingham City

- Football League Third Division runner-up: 1991–92
- Associate Members' Cup: 1990–91

Northampton Town

- Football League Third Division third-place promotion: 1999–2000
