= Shaun Wade (footballer) =

English footballer (born 1969)

Personal information
- Full name: Shaun Peter Wade
- Date of birth: 22 September 1969 (age 57)
- Place of birth: Stoke-on-Trent, England
- Position: Forward

Senior career*
Years	Team	Apps	(Gls)
- Newcastle Town
1994–1995	Stoke City	1	(0)
–	Newcastle Town		
- * Club domestic league appearances and goals

Shaun Peter Wade (born 22 September 1969) is an English former footballer who played in the Football League for Stoke City.

== Career ==
Wade was born in Stoke-on-Trent and began his career with local side Newcastle Town. He was given a chance to play professional football by Stoke City manager Lou Macari quite belatedly at the age of 24. He made just one appearance for Stoke which came as a substitute in a 1–1 at home to Sheffield United in November 1994. A cruciate knee ligament injury ended his chances of a professional career and he returned to Newcastle Town.

== Career statistics ==
Appearances and goals by club, season and competition
Club	Season	League			FA Cup		League Cup		Total	
Club	Season	Division	Apps	Goals	Apps	Goals	Apps	Goals	Apps	Goals
Stoke City	1994–95	First Division	1	0	0	0	0	0	1	0
Career total			1	0	0	0	0	0	1	0
