= Martin Carruthers =

English footballer & manager (born 1972)

Personal information
- Full name: Martin George Carruthers
- Date of birth: 7 August 1972 (age 54)
- Place of birth: Nottingham, England
- Height: 5 ft 11 in (1.80 m)
- Position: Forward

Team information
- Current team: Basford United (manager)

Senior career*
| Years | Team | Apps | (Gls) |
| 1990–1993 | Aston Villa | 4 | (0) |
| 1992 | → Hull City (loan) | 13 | (6) |
| 1993–1996 | Stoke City | 91 | (13) |
| 1996–1999 | Peterborough United | 67 | (21) |
| 1999 | → York City (loan) | 6 | (0) |
| 1999 | Darlington | 17 | (2) |
| 1999 | → Southend United (loan) | 5 | (3) |
| 1999–2001 | Southend United | 65 | (23) |
| 2001–2003 | Scunthorpe United | 86 | (34) |
| 2003–2004 | Macclesfield Town | 39 | (8) |
| 2004 | Boston United | 6 | (0) |
| 2004–2005 | Lincoln City | 11 | (0) |
| 2005 | → Cambridge United (loan) | 5 | (0) |
| 2005–2006 | Grantham Town | | |
| 2006 | → Ilkeston Town (loan) | | |
| 2006–2008 | Ilkeston Town | | |
| 2008–2012 | Arnold Town | | |
| 2012–2019 | Basford United | | |

Managerial career
- 2009–2012: Arnold Town
- 2013–2019: Basford United
- 2019: Quorn
- 2019–2022: Ilkeston Town
- 2022–2024: Matlock Town
- 2024: Basford United
- 2025–2026: Basford United
- * Club domestic league appearances and goals

Martin George Carruthers (born 7 August 1972) is an English former footballer who played as a forward for Aston Villa, Hull City, Stoke City, Peterborough United, York City, Darlington, Southend United, Scunthorpe United, Macclesfield Town, Boston United, Lincoln City and Cambridge United. He is the Former manager of Basford United.

== Career ==
Carruthers was born in Nottingham and began his career with Aston Villa. He failed to break into the first team at Villa Park and, after a loan at Hull City where he scored six goals in 13 matches, he joined Stoke City in July 1993. He scored nine goals in 45 appearances in 1993–94 as Stoke finished in 10th position. He scored eight goals in 42 matches in 1994–95. He struggled for form in 1995–96 scoring just three goals after losing his place in the side in 1996–97 he joined Peterborough United in November 1996. He spent three years at Peterborough scoring 21 goals in 67 league matches and after a short loan spell at York City he signed for Darlington.

He soon went on to Southend United before enjoying the most prolific spell of his career at Scunthorpe United where he scored 34 goals in 86 league games. Carruthers then went on to play for Macclesfield Town, Boston United, Lincoln City and ended his professional career with Cambridge United.

He then went on to play non-league football, joining Grantham Town in 2005, and then Ilkeston Town (initially on loan) in 2006. He went on to become player-assistant manager at Ilkeston, before joining Arnold Town in 2008, becoming joint manager alongside Chris Freestone two games into the 2009–10 season. They both left the club in June 2012, and Carruthers subsequently signed for Basford United as a player in 2012, becoming player-manager in 2013. He departed the club in March 2019.

== Coaching career ==
On 20 May 2019, he was appointed manager at Quorn. At the end of November, he departed the club to become head coach at Ilkeston Town linking up with his former Basford United assistant manager Mark Clifford who now owned the club. In the 2021–22 season, Ilkeston were promoted as champions of the Northern Premier League Division One Midlands. Carruthers left the club by mutual consent on 6 September 2022.

On 15 December 2022, he was appointed manager of Matlock Town. Carruthers resigned from his role in March 2024. Following his resignation, Carruthers return to Basford United. In May 2025, he once again returned to Basford United in the role of Head of Football. On 9 October 2025, he was once again appointed manager of Basford United , As of August 2026 Carruthers resigned as Basford United Manager and it is unknown if he is managing another team .

== Personal life ==
After retiring, he became Education manager at Notts County's Academy.

== Career statistics ==
Appearances and goals by club, season and competition
| Club | Season | League | | | FA Cup | | League Cup | | Other^{[A]} | | Total | |
| Club | Season | Division | Apps | Goals | Apps | Goals | Apps | Goals | Apps | Goals | Apps | Goals |
|---|---|---|---|---|---|---|---|---|---|---|---|---|
| Aston Villa | 1991–92 | First Division | 3 | 0 | 1 | 0 | 0 | 0 | 1 | 0 | 5 | 0 |
| Aston Villa | 1992–93 | Premier League | 1 | 0 | 0 | 0 | 0 | 0 | 0 | 0 | 1 | 0 |
| Aston Villa | Total | | 4 | 0 | 1 | 0 | 0 | 0 | 1 | 0 | 6 | 0 |
| Hull City (loan) | 1992–93 | Second Division | 13 | 6 | 0 | 0 | 0 | 0 | 3 | 0 | 16 | 6 |
| Stoke City | 1993–94 | First Division | 34 | 5 | 2 | 0 | 3 | 1 | 5 | 3 | 44 | 9 |
| Stoke City | 1994–95 | First Division | 32 | 5 | 1 | 0 | 3 | 0 | 6 | 3 | 42 | 8 |
| Stoke City | 1995–96 | First Division | 24 | 3 | 1 | 0 | 3 | 0 | 3 | 0 | 31 | 3 |
| Stoke City | 1996–97 | First Division | 1 | 0 | 0 | 0 | 1 | 0 | 0 | 0 | 2 | 0 |
| Stoke City | Total | | 91 | 13 | 4 | 0 | 10 | 1 | 14 | 6 | 119 | 20 |
| Peterborough United | 1996–97 | Second Division | 14 | 4 | 3 | 2 | 0 | 0 | 2 | 0 | 19 | 6 |
| Peterborough United | 1997–98 | Third Division | 39 | 15 | 3 | 2 | 4 | 1 | 3 | 0 | 49 | 18 |
| Peterborough United | 1998–99 | Third Division | 14 | 2 | 0 | 0 | 2 | 1 | 1 | 0 | 17 | 3 |
| Peterborough United | Total | | 67 | 21 | 6 | 4 | 6 | 2 | 6 | 0 | 85 | 27 |
| York City (loan) | 1998–99 | Third Division | 6 | 0 | 0 | 0 | 0 | 0 | 0 | 0 | 6 | 0 |
| Darlington | 1998–99 | Third Division | 11 | 2 | 0 | 0 | 0 | 0 | 0 | 0 | 11 | 2 |
| Darlington | 1999–2000 | Third Division | 6 | 0 | 0 | 0 | 2 | 0 | 0 | 0 | 8 | 0 |
| Darlington | Total | | 17 | 2 | 0 | 0 | 2 | 0 | 0 | 0 | 19 | 2 |
| Southend United | 1999–2000 | Third Division | 38 | 19 | 1 | 0 | 0 | 0 | 1 | 0 | 40 | 19 |
| Southend United | 2000–01 | Third Division | 32 | 7 | 4 | 0 | 2 | 0 | 5 | 3 | 43 | 10 |
| Southend United | Total | | 70 | 26 | 5 | 0 | 2 | 0 | 6 | 3 | 73 | 29 |
| Scunthorpe United | 2000–01 | Third Division | 8 | 1 | 0 | 0 | 0 | 0 | 0 | 0 | 8 | 1 |
| Scunthorpe United | 2001–02 | Third Division | 33 | 13 | 2 | 3 | 1 | 0 | 3 | 1 | 39 | 17 |
| Scunthorpe United | 2002–03 | Third Division | 45 | 20 | 4 | 1 | 1 | 0 | 3 | 0 | 53 | 21 |
| Scunthorpe United | Total | | 86 | 34 | 6 | 4 | 2 | 0 | 6 | 1 | 100 | 46 |
| Macclesfield Town | 2003–04 | Third Division | 39 | 8 | 4 | 2 | 1 | 0 | 1 | 0 | 45 | 10 |
| Boston United | 2004–05 | League Two | 6 | 0 | 0 | 0 | 1 | 0 | 0 | 0 | 7 | 0 |
| Lincoln City | 2004–05 | League Two | 11 | 0 | 0 | 0 | 0 | 0 | 1 | 0 | 12 | 0 |
| Cambridge United (loan) | 2004–05 | League Two | 5 | 0 | 0 | 0 | 0 | 0 | 0 | 0 | 5 | 0 |
| Career total | | | 415 | 110 | 26 | 10 | 24 | 3 | 38 | 10 | 503 | 133 |

A. The "Other" column constitutes appearances and goals in the Football League Trophy, Football League play-offs and Full Members' Cup.
