= Keith Scott (footballer) =

English footballer (born 1967)

Personal information
- Full name: Keith Scott
- Date of birth: 9 June 1967 (age 59)
- Place of birth: City of Westminster, London, England
- Position: Striker

Senior career*
Years	Team	Apps	(Gls)
1986–1987	Hinckley Athletic		
1987–1988	Bedworth United		
1988–1989	Hinckley Athletic		
1989–1990	Leicester United		
1990–1991	Lincoln City	16	(2)
1990	→ Gateshead (loan)	3	(4)
1991	→ Boston United (loan)	2	(2)
1991–1993	Wycombe Wanderers	134	(75)
1993–1994	Swindon Town	51	(12)
1994–1995	Stoke City	25	(3)
1995–1997	Norwich City	25	(6)
1996	→ AFC Bournemouth (loan)	8	(1)
1997	→ Watford (loan)	6	(2)
1997	→ Wycombe Wanderers (loan)	34	(9)
1997–1999	Wycombe Wanderers	25	(6)
1999–2001	Reading	35	(5)
2000	→ Colchester United (loan)	5	(1)
2001	Colchester United	4	(0)
2001–2002	Dover Athletic	40	(14)
2002–2003	Scarborough	28	(9)
2003	Leigh RMI	11	(3)
2003–2004	Dagenham & Redbridge	0	(0)
2003	→ Tamworth (loan)	4	(0)
2003–2005	Windsor & Eton	61	(18)
2005–2006	Northwood	1	(0)
Total		399	(106)

Managerial career
- 2006–2008: Leighton Town
- 2007–2010: Windsor & Eton
- 2011–2012: Windsor
- * Club domestic league appearances and goals

Keith Scott (born 9 June 1967) is a former professional footballer who played as a striker.

He played professional football with Lincoln City, Wycombe Wanderers, Swindon Town, Stoke City, Norwich City, AFC Bournemouth, Watford, Reading and Colchester United.

== Playing career ==
Scott was born in the City of Westminster before moving to Leicester. He began playing non-league football with Hinckley Athletic, Bedworth United and Leicester United before turning professional with Lincoln City in 1990. Whilst with Lincoln he spent time out on loan at Gateshead and Boston United before playing for Conference side Wycombe Wanderers and gaining promotion to the football league in 1993. After a flying start to the following season Scott moved to Swindon Town scoring 10 goals in the Premier League. After scoring 12 goals for Swindon following their relegation to the 1st Division, he moved to Stoke City in December 1994 but he endured a torrid spell at the Victoria Ground scoring just four goals and was swapped with Norwich City for their forward Mike Sheron.

After several years in the Championship where he achieved modest success, Keith moved back to struggling Wycombe Wanderers in League One, where his powerful performances and goal record earnt him a move to Reading for £250,000. Wycombe, who at the time were in need of the money, accepted the offer. Following a good professional career spanning 15 years, Keith, now 35 went to the Conference. He played for Dover Athletic, Scarborough, Leigh RMI, Dagenham & Redbridge, Tamworth, Windsor & Eton and finally Northwood.

== Managerial career ==
A UEFA 'A' and 'B' licence holder, he was appointed Manager of Leighton Town in October 2006. A shortage of players forced Scott to take the field against Dunstable Town in January 2007 in the unusual position of goalkeeper, a position he had never previously occupied. Scott met with success at Leighton. They were eleven points from safety at the bottom of the Southern League Division One Midlands when he was appointed, but he led them to safety and also to victory in the Buckingham Senior Charity Cup Final in May 2007. In the 2007–08 season, he steered the club to their most successful campaign in the FA Cup, reaching the Fourth Qualifying Round where they were defeated by Havant & Waterlooville. In December 2007, Scott resigned his post to take up the managerial reins at Windsor & Eton.

Scott left Windsor & Eton FC the season before their demise having led them to the League title in Step 3 of the non-league pyramid and winning the Berks and Bucks cup. Eventually, the club was liquidated following an un-paid tax bill from their Chairman.

== Career statistics ==
Appearances and goals by club, season and competition
Club	Season	League			FA Cup		League Cup		Other (Note: Includes Anglo-Italian Cup, Football League Trophy.)		Total	
Club	Season	Division	Apps	Goals	Apps	Goals	Apps	Goals	Apps	Goals	Apps	Goals
Lincoln City	1989–90	Fourth Division	10	2	0	0	0	0	0	0	10	2
Lincoln City	1990–91	Fourth Division	6	0	0	0	1	0	2	0	9	0
Lincoln City	Total		16	2	0	0	1	0	2	0	19	2
Gateshead (loan)	1990–91	Football Conference	3	4	0	0	0	0	0	0	3	4
Boston United (loan)	1990–91	Football Conference	2	2	0	0	0	0	0	0	2	2
Wycombe Wanderers	1991–94	Football Conference/Third Division	96	54	1	0	4	2	2	2	22	14
Swindon Town	1993–94	Premier League	27	4	0	0	0	0	0	0	27	4
Swindon Town	1994–95	First Division	24	7	0	0	5	3	3	1	32	11
Swindon Town	Total		51	11	0	0	5	3	3	1	59	15
Stoke City	1994–95	First Division	18	3	2	1	0	0	0	0	20	4
Stoke City	1995–96	First Division	7	0	0	0	0	0	1	0	8	0
Stoke City	Total		25	3	2	1	0	0	1	0	28	4
Norwich City	1995–96	First Division	12	2	0	0	2	0	0	0	14	2
Norwich City	1996–97	First Division	13	3	2	0	0	0	0	0	15	3
Norwich City	Total		25	5	2	0	2	0	0	0	29	5
AFC Bournemouth (loan)	1995–96	Second Division	8	1	0	0	0	0	0	0	8	1
Watford (loan)	1996–97	Second Division	6	2	0	0	0	0	2	0	8	2
Wycombe Wanderers	1996–97	Second Division	9	3	0	0	0	0	0	0	9	3
Wycombe Wanderers	1997–98	Second Division	29	11	2	0	1	2	1	0	33	13
Wycombe Wanderers	1998–99	Second Division	25	6	3	1	1	0	1	0	30	7
Wycombe Wanderers	Total		63	20	5	1	2	2	2	0	72	23
Reading	1998–99	Second Division	9	2	0	0	0	0	0	0	9	2
Reading	1999–2000	Second Division	25	3	3	0	3	2	3	1	34	6
Reading	2000–01	Second Division	1	0	0	0	0	0	0	0	1	0
Reading	Total		35	5	3	0	3	2	3	1	44	8
Colchester United (loan)	2000–01	Second Division	9	1	0	0	0	0	0	0	9	1
Dover Athletic	2001–02	Football Conference	40	14	0	0	0	0	0	0	40	14
Scarborough	2002–03	Football Conference	28	9	2	0	0	0	1	1	32	10
Leigh RMI	2002–03	Football Conference	11	3	0	0	0	0	0	0	11	3
Tamworth	2003–04	Football Conference	4	0	0	0	0	0	0	0	4	0
Career total			341	92	15	2	17	9	16	5	389	108

== Honours ==
Wycombe Wanderers

- Football Conference: 1992–93
- FA Trophy: 1990–91, 1992–93
