= Mark Prudhoe =

English footballer

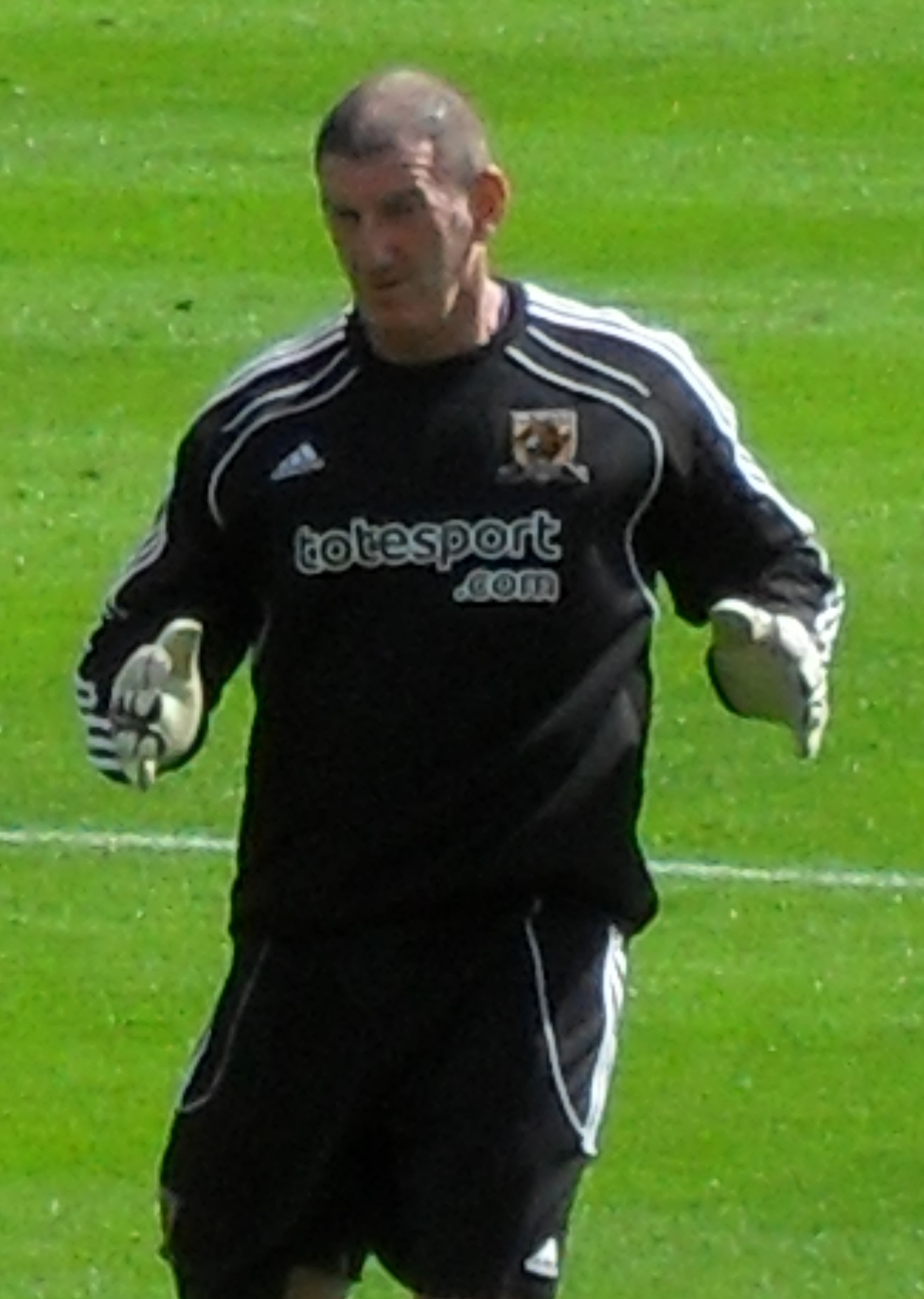
- Prudhoe with Hull City in 2010

Personal information
- Full name: Mark Prudhoe
- Date of birth: 8 November 1963 (age 63)
- Place of birth: Washington, England
- Position: Goalkeeper

Team information
- Current team: Sunderland (coach)

Youth career
- 19xx–1981: Sunderland

Senior career*
Years	Team	Apps	(Gls)
1981–1984	Sunderland	7	(0)
1983	→ Hartlepool United (loan)	3	(0)
1984–1986	Birmingham City	1	(0)
1986–1987	Walsall	26	(0)
1986	→ Doncaster Rovers (loan)	5	(0)
1987	→ Sheffield Wednesday (loan)	0	(0)
1987	→ Grimsby Town (loan)	8	(0)
1987	→ Hartlepool United (loan)	13	(0)
1987	→ Bristol City (loan)	3	(0)
1987–1989	Carlisle United	34	(0)
1989–1993	Darlington	146	(0)
1993–1997	Stoke City	82	(0)
1994	→ Peterborough United (loan)	6	(0)
1994	→ Liverpool (loan)	0	(0)
1997	→ York City (loan)	2	(0)
1997–1999	Bradford City	8	(0)
1999	→ Darlington (loan)	0	(0)
1999–2000	Southend United	6	(0)
2001–2003	Bradford City	0	(0)
2003–2004	Macclesfield Town	0	(0)
Total		350	(0)
- * Club domestic league appearances and goals

Mark Prudhoe (born 8 November 1963) is an English former professional footballer who played as a goalkeeper for 17 different Football League clubs.

== Career ==
Prudhoe was born in Washington, County Durham, and began his career with Sunderland and became a typical journeyman footballer. After a loan spell with Hartlepool United Prudhoe had short spells with Birmingham City, Walsall, Doncaster Rovers, Sheffield Wednesday, Grimsby Town, a return to Hartlepool United, Bristol City and Carlisle United. He then joined Darlington in 1989, where he picked up winner's medals for both the Football Conference and the Football League Fourth Division title.

This earned him a moved to Stoke City where he played 38 times in 1993–94, 48 times in 1995–96 and 15 in 1996–97. Whilst at Stoke Prudhoe spent time out on loan at Peterborough United, Liverpool and York City. He then went on to play for Bradford City, a second spell at Darlington, Southend United, a second spell at Bradford and ended his career at Macclesfield Town.

== Coaching career ==
Following his retirement as a player, Prudhoe was appointed goalkeeping coach at Hull City in 2005, and in 2011 returned to Sunderland to coach in their academy.

== Career statistics ==
Appearances and goals by club, season and competition
Club	Season	League			FA Cup		League Cup		Other		Total	
Club	Season	Division	Apps	Goals	Apps	Goals	Apps	Goals	Apps	Goals	Apps	Goals
Sunderland	1982–83	First Division	7	0	0	0	0	0	0	0	7	0
Hartlepool United (loan)	1983–84	Fourth Division	3	0	0	0	0	0	0	0	3	0
Birmingham City	1984–85	Second Division	1	0	0	0	4	0	0	0	5	0
Walsall	1985–86	Third Division	16	0	0	0	0	0	0	0	16	0
Walsall	1986–87	Third Division	10	0	1	0	4	0	0	0	15	0
Walsall	Total		26	0	1	0	4	0	0	0	31	0
Doncaster Rovers (loan)	1986–87	Third Division	5	0	0	0	0	0	0	0	5	0
Grimsby Town (loan)	1986–87	Second Division	8	0	0	0	0	0	0	0	8	0
Hartlepool United (loan)	1987–88	Fourth Division	13	0	0	0	0	0	0	0	13	0
Bristol City (loan)	1987–88	Third Division	3	0	0	0	0	0	2 (Note: Appearances in Football League Trophy)	0	5	0
Carlisle United	1987–88	Fourth Division	22	0	0	0	0	0	0	0	22	0
Carlisle United	1988–89	Fourth Division	12	0	0	0	2	0	0	0	14	0
Carlisle United	Total		34	0	0	0	2	0	0	0	36	0
Darlington	1988–89	Fourth Division	12	0	0	0	0	0	0	0	12	0
Darlington	1990–91	Fourth Division	46	0	2	0	4	0	3	0	55	0
Darlington	1991–92	Third Division	46	0	2	0	2	0	2	0	54	0
Darlington	1992–93	Fourth Division	42	0	1	0	2	0	1	0	46	0
Darlington	Total		146	0	5	0	8	0	6	0	165	0
Stoke City	1993–94	First Division	30	0	2	0	3	0	3 (Note: Appearances in Anglo-Italian Cup)	0	38	0
Stoke City	1994–95	First Division	0	0	0	0	0	0	0	0	0	0
Stoke City	1995–96	First Division	39	0	2	0	3	0	4 (Note: Two Appearances in Anglo-Italian Cup and two in First Division Play-offs)	0	48	0
Stoke City	1996–97	First Division	13	0	1	0	1	0	0	0	15	0
Stoke City	Total		82	0	5	0	7	0	7	0	101	0
Peterborough United (loan)	1994–95	Second Division	6	0	0	0	0	0	0	0	6	0
York City (loan)	1996–97	Second Division	2	0	0	0	0	0	0	0	2	0
Bradford City	1997–98	First Division	8	0	0	0	1	0	0	0	9	0
Southend United	1999–2000	Third Division	6	0	0	0	0	0	0	0	6	0
Career total			350	0	11	0	26	0	15	0	402	0

== Honours ==
Darlington

- Football League Fourth Division: 1990–91
- Football Conference: 1989–90

Individual

- PFA Team of the Year: 1992–93 Third Division
- Stoke City Player of the Year: 1995–96
