= 1995–96 Stoke City F.C. season =

Stoke City
1995–96 season
- Chairman: Peter Coates
- Manager: Lou Macari
- Stadium: Victoria Ground
- Football League First Division: 4th (73 Points)
- Play-offs: Semi-final
- FA Cup: Third Round
- League Cup: Fourth Round
- Anglo-Italian Cup: Group Stage
- Top goalscorer: League: Mike Sheron (16); All: Mike Sheron (16)
- Highest home attendance: 18,897 vs Southend United (5 May 1996)
- Lowest home attendance: 8,618 vs Tranmere Rovers (16 September 1995)
- Average home league attendance: 12,279
Home colours

The 1995–96 season was Stoke City's 89th season in the Football League and 33rd in the second tier.

Prior to the start of the 1995–96 season, the possibility of building a new stadium to bring Stoke up to the requirements of the Taylor Report was discussed. On the pitch Stoke enjoyed their most successful season for quite a long time as they mounted a push for promotion to the Premier League and made the end-of-season play-offs against Leicester City. However, Leicester scored the only goal in the two-legged tie and they were the team that went on to be promoted.

== Season review ==
=== League ===
There were few transactions taking place in the summer of 1995 with the main talk being about a change of home. The Taylor Report had come to the conclusion that all football stadia in England should be all-seater and the best option for Stoke would be to build a new stadium rather than convert the Victoria Ground. The season began slowly with one win picked up in the first eight matches and with Icelandic midfielder Toddy Orlygsson leaving for Oldham Athletic after a contract dispute. But wins over Midlands rivals West Bromwich Albion and Wolverhampton Wanderers kick started Stoke's season and after a 5–0 win at home against Luton Town, City went on a run of six wins in seven and took the team into the play-off zone. In November Stoke completed a master-stroke signing swapping Keith Scott, for Mike Sheron at Norwich City. He formed a great partnership with Simon Sturridge and the pair scored 29 goals between them this season.

Fielding a settled side, Stoke continued to remain in the hunt for promotion and after a 2–0 win at home to rivals Barnsley at the start of March Stoke put distance between themselves and 7th. But on transfer deadline day Paul Peschisolido was controversially sold back to Birmingham City with Macari claiming not to have been aware of any deal. Attention was diverted by Sheron's club record run of seven goals in seven games as five wins out the last seven cemented Stoke place in the play-offs. By this time it was agreed and ratified that in two years Stoke would be moving to a new purpose-built all-seater stadium. Stoke's opponents in the play-offs were Martin O'Neill's Leicester City whom Stoke had already beaten twice in the league. The first leg at Filbert Street ended 0–0. In the second leg, Stoke produced a poor performance and Leicester scored the only goal, Garry Parker's left-foot volley ending Stoke's hopes of promotion.

=== FA Cup ===
Stoke outplayed Premier League Nottingham Forest but fell to a 2–0 defeat in a replay.

=== League Cup ===
Stoke drew Chelsea in the second round and after a 0–0 draw at home Stoke produced a brilliant performance away at Stamford Bridge and came away with a memorable 1–0 victory thanks to a 75th-minute goal from Paul Peschisolido. Alas Stoke couldn't match another Premiership side, Newcastle United, who eased to a 4–0 win.

== Final league table ==
Pos	Team	Pld	W	D	L	GF	GA	GD	Pts	Qualification or relegation
2	Derby County (P)	46	21	16	9	71	51	+20	79	Promotion to the Premier League
3	Crystal Palace	46	20	15	11	67	48	+19	75	Qualification for the First Division play-offs
4	Stoke City	46	20	13	13	60	49	+11	73	Qualification for the First Division play-offs
5	Leicester City (O, P)	46	19	14	13	66	60	+6	71	Qualification for the First Division play-offs
6	Charlton Athletic	46	17	20	9	57	45	+12	71	Qualification for the First Division play-offs

Rules for classification: 1) Points; 2) Goals scored; 3) Goal difference
(O) Play-off winners; (P) Promoted

== Results ==
=== Legend ===
Win	Draw	Loss

=== Football League First Division ===
Match	Date	Opponent	Venue	Result	Attendance	Scorers
1	12 August 1995	Reading	H	1–1	11,932	Wallace 12'
2	19 August 1995	Leicester City	A	3–2	17,719	Peschisolido (2) 9', 23', Gleghorn 33'
3	27 August 1995	Port Vale	H	0–1	14,283	
4	30 August 1995	Ipswich Town	A	1–4	10,848	Peschisolido 83'
5	2 September 1995	Oldham Athletic	H	0–1	8,663	
6	9 September 1995	Watford	A	0–3	7,130	
7	12 September 1995	Birmingham City	A	1–1	19,005	Carruthers 52'
8	16 September 1995	Tranmere Rovers	H	0–0	8,618	
9	24 September 1995	West Bromwich Albion	H	2–1	9,612	Peschisolido 14', Keen 51'
10	28 September 1995	Crystal Palace	A	1–1	14,613	Carruthers 36'
11	7 October 1995	Norwich City	H	1–1	12,016	Wallace 67'
12	14 October 1995	Wolverhampton Wanderers	A	4–1	26,486	Gleghorn 36', Potter 41', Wallace 85', Carruthers 90'
13	22 October 1995	Derby County	H	1–1	9,436	Keen 66'
14	28 October 1995	Grimsby Town	A	0–1	5,477	
15	4 November 1995	Luton Town	H	5–0	9,382	Peschisolido 14', Sturridge (2) 73', 87', Gayle 75', Gleghorn 90'
16	11 November 1995	Southend United	A	4–2	5,967	Sturridge (3) 32', 63', 75', Gleghorn 65'
17	18 November 1995	Portsmouth	A	3–3	8,030	Gayle (2) 29', 61', Sturridge 63'
18	22 November 1995	Sunderland	H	1–0	11,754	Wallace 21'
19	25 November 1995	Millwall	H	1–0	12,590	Gleghorn 62'
20	2 December 1995	Norwich City	A	1–0	15,707	Gleghorn 53'
21	9 December 1995	West Bromwich Albion	A	1–0	14,819	Peschisolido 35'
22	16 December 1995	Crystal Palace	H	1–2	12,090	Sheron 87'
23	23 December 1995	Sheffield United	H	2–2	12,265	Gleghorn 27', Sheron 46'
24	26 December 1995	Barnsley	A	1–3	9,229	Gleghorn 68'
25	30 December 1995	Huddersfield Town	A	1–1	15,669	Sheron 57'
26	13 January 1996	Leicester City	H	1–0	15,071	Sheron 47'
27	20 January 1996	Reading	A	0–1	8,082	
28	10 February 1996	Ipswich Town	H	3–1	12,239	Sheron (2) 37', 75', Gleghorn 65'
29	17 February 1996	Birmingham City	H	1–0	15,716	Sturridge 25'
30	24 February 1996	Tranmere Rovers	A	0–0	18,312	
31	28 February 1996	Watford	H	2–0	10,114	Cranson 48', Wallace 62'
32	2 March 1996	Barnsley	H	2–0	12,663	Keen 39', Sheron 70'
33	9 March 1996	Sheffield United	A	0–0	14,468	
34	12 March 1996	Port Vale	A	0–1	16,737	
35	16 March 1996	Huddersfield Town	H	1–1	13,157	Sturridge 66'
36	23 March 1996	Charlton Athletic	A	1–2	12,770	Sheron 41'
37	30 March 1996	Derby County	A	1–3	17,245	Sheron 22'
38	1 April 1996	Wolverhampton Wanderers	H	2–0	16,361	Sheron 3', Sturridge 58'
39	6 April 1996	Grimsby Town	H	1–2	12,524	Sheron 35'
40	9 April 1996	Luton Town	A	2–1	7,689	Sturridge 86', Sheron 90'
41	13 April 1996	Portsmouth	H	2–1	11,471	Wallace 7', Sheron 90'
42	17 April 1996	Charlton Athletic	H	1–0	12,969	Sheron 29'
43	21 April 1996	Sunderland	A	0–0	21,276	
44	27 April 1996	Millwall	A	3–2	10,105	Sheron 28', Sturridge (2) 32', 70 (pen)
45	30 April 1996	Oldham Athletic	A	0–2	10,271	
46	5 May 1996	Southend United	H	1–0	18,897	Sheron 12'

=== First Division play-offs ===
Round	Date	Opponent	Venue	Result	Attendance	Scorers
Semi-final 1st Leg	12 May 1996	Leicester City	A	0–0	20,325	
Semi-final 2nd Leg	15 May 1996	Leicester City	H	0–1	21,037	

=== FA Cup ===
Round	Date	Opponent	Venue	Result	Attendance	Scorers
R3	6 January 1996	Nottingham Forest	H	1–1	17,947	Sturridge 27'
R3 Replay	17 January 1996	Nottingham Forest	A	0–2	17,372	

=== League Cup ===
Round	Date	Opponent	Venue	Result	Attendance	Scorers
R2 1st Leg	20 September 1995	Chelsea	H	0–0	15,574	
R2 2nd Leg	4 October 1995	Chelsea	A	1–0	16,272	Peschisolido 75'
R3	25 October 1995	Newcastle United	H	0–4	23,000	

=== Anglo-Italian Cup ===
- Note: The final group match against Reggiana was postponed and never replayed the result defaulted at 0–0.

Round	Date	Opponent	Venue	Result	Attendance	Scorers
Group Match 1	5 September 1995	Foggia	A	1–1	4,200	Peschisolido 65'
Group Match 2	11 October 1995	Salernitana	H	2–2	5,071	Peschisolido 3', Wallace 47'
Group Match 3	8 November 1995	Brescia	H	1–1	4,193	Dreyer 90'
Group Match 4	13 December 1995	Reggiana	A	0–0		

== Squad statistics ==
Pos.	Name	League		FA Cup		League Cup		Anglo-Italian Cup		Play-offs		Total	
Pos.	Name	Apps	Goals	Apps	Goals	Apps	Goals	Apps	Goals	Apps	Goals	Apps	Goals
GK	(England) Phil Morgan	0	0	0	0	0	0	0	0	0	0	0	0
GK	(England) Carl Muggleton	6	0	0	0	0	0	0	0	0	0	6	0
GK	(England) Mark Prudhoe	39	0	2	0	3	0	2	0	2	0	48	0
GK	(Scotland) Ronnie Sinclair	1	0	0	0	0	0	1	0	0	0	2	0
DF	(England) Mark Birch	0	0	0	0	0	0	0	0	0	0	0	0
DF	(England) David Brightwell	0(1)	0	0	0	0	0	1	0	0	0	1(1)	0
DF	(England) Ian Clarkson	43	0	2	0	3	0	2	0	2	0	52	0
DF	(England) Ian Cranson	23(1)	1	1	0	0(1)	0	1	0	0	0	25(2)	1
DF	(England) John Dreyer	4(15)	0	1	0	0	0	1(1)	1	0	0	6(16)	1
DF	(England) Graham Potter	38(3)	1	2	0	3	0	3	0	2	0	48(3)	1
DF	(England) Lee Sandford	46	0	2	0	3	0	2	0	2	0	55	0
DF	(Iceland) Lárus Sigurðsson	46	0	2	0	3	0	2	0	2	0	55	0
DF	(England) Ray Wallace	44	6	2	0	3	0	3	1	2	0	54	7
DF	(England) Justin Whittle	7(1)	0	0	0	0	0	0	0	2	0	9(1)	0
MF	(England) Carl Beeston	13(3)	0	0	0	0	0	0	0	0	0	13(3)	0
MF	(Scotland) Mark Devlin	5(5)	0	0	0	0	0	0(2)	0	2	0	7(7)	0
MF	(England) Nigel Gleghorn	46	9	2	0	3	0	3	0	2	0	56	9
MF	(England) Kevin Keen	27(6)	3	2	0	2	0	2	0	0	0	33(6)	3
MF	(Scotland) Chris McDonald	0	0	0	0	0	0	0	0	0	0	0	0
MF	(Iceland) Toddy Orlygsson	6(1)	0	0	0	0	0	2	0	0	0	8(1)	0
MF	(England) Vince Overson	18	0	0	0	3	0	1	0	0	0	22	0
FW	(England) Martin Carruthers	10(14)	3	1	0	3	0	2	0	0(1)	0	16(15)	3
FW	(England) John Gayle	5(5)	3	0(1)	0	0	0	1(1)	0	0	0	6(7)	3
FW	(Canada) Paul Peschisolido	20(6)	6	1	0	3	1	2	2	0	0	26(6)	9
FW	(England) Keith Scott	6(1)	0	0	0	0	0	0(1)	0	0	0	6(2)	0
FW	(England) Mike Sheron	23(5)	16	0	0	0	0	0	0	2	0	25(5)	16
FW	(England) Simon Sturridge	30(11)	12	2	1	1	0	2	0	2	0	37(11)	13
