= Richie Moran (footballer) =

English footballer

Personal information
- Date of birth: 9 September 1963 (age 63)
- Place of birth: London, England
- Position: Centre forward

Senior career*
Years	Team	Apps	(Gls)
- Fareham Town
1988–1989	Gosport Borough	69	(26)
1989	Fujita Kogyo		
1990–1991	Birmingham City	8	(1)
1991	→ Kettering Town (loan)		
1991	Bashley		
1991–19??	Waterlooville		
- * Club domestic league appearances and goals

Richard Moran (born 9 September 1963) is an English former professional footballer who played in the Football League for Birmingham City. He played as a centre forward.

== Career ==
Moran was born in London to Nigerian parents. He attended primary school in ethnically-diverse south-east London, but was then adopted by an Anglo-Irish family (Patrick and Daphne Moran) and attended Brune Park secondary school in Gosport, Hampshire, a predominantly white area. He played non-league football for Fareham Town and Gosport Borough for each of whom he was a prolific goalscorer and scored a goal for the latter in the 1988 Hampshire senior cup final. He then became sought after by football league clubs but chose to move to Japan where he played for Fujita. On his return to England he spent time with Norwich city and Leeds United.He ultimately joined Birmingham City. He made his debut in the Third Division on 1 September 1990, entering the game as a substitute for Robert Hopkins to score Birmingham's third goal in a 3–1 home defeat on Leyton Orient. Unfortunately he was unable to reproduce the goalscoring form he had shown in non-league football and after becoming racially abused and annoyed with the lack of multicultural opportunities of first team football, he dropped out of the Football League the following year.

Moran left the game because of the racism he encountered within it, stating that he "was racially abused by some of the biggest names in the game. A lot of it is put down to dressing room banter, stupidity, or footballers being working class, but these are all excuses." He attributes his falling out of favour at Birmingham to a refusal to go along with what he perceived as racially offensive treatment, and is angered by "the lack of black players who seem willing to stick their heads above the parapet and condemn racism". Moran has written and campaigned on issues of racism and conscience, and wrote a book about his experiences while travelling the world.
