= Nigel Gleghorn =

English footballer (born 1962)

Personal information
- Full name: Nigel William Gleghorn.
- Date of birth: 12 August 1962 (age 64)
- Place of birth: Seaham, England
- Height: 6 ft 1 in (1.85 m)
- Positions: Forward; midfielder

Senior career*
Years	Team	Apps	(Gls)
19??–1985	Seaham Red Star		
1985–1988	Ipswich Town	66	(11)
1988–1989	Manchester City	34	(7)
1989–1992	Birmingham City	142	(33)
1992–1996	Stoke City	166	(26)
1996–1998	Burnley	34	(4)
1997–1998	→ Brentford (loan)	12	(1)
1998	→ Northampton Town (loan)	8	(1)
1998	Altrincham		
1998–2001	Witton Albion		
2001–2004	Nantwich Town		
2004–2006	Newcastle Town		
Total		462	(83)

Managerial career
- 1998–2001: Witton Albion (player-manager)
- 2001–2004: Nantwich Town (player-manager)
- 2004–2006: Newcastle Town (player-manager)
- * Club domestic league appearances and goals

Nigel William Gleghorn (born 12 August 1962) is an English former professional footballer who played as a forward or central midfielder.

== Career ==
Gleghorn worked as a firefighter, playing part-time for his local club Seaham Red Star in the Northern League Division Two, until successful trials at Ipswich Town led to the offer of a professional contract. Reluctant to give up a steady job in the fire service to risk failing as a footballer, his wife convinced him to take the chance. Within weeks the 23-year-old Gleghorn was making his debut in the First Division away to Arsenal. After three seasons at Portman Road he moved on to Manchester City.

He spent one season at Manchester City in which the side were promoted to the First Division, but after only a few games back in the top flight Gleghorn was sold to Birmingham City, recently relegated to the Third Division, for a relatively big fee of £175,000. He stayed for three seasons, helping the team to victory in the Football League Trophy final at Wembley in 1991 and promotion to the newly designated Division One in 1991–92. In that season he was Birmingham's top scorer with 22 goals in all competitions and scored the winner against Shrewsbury in the last home game of the season when the club needed a win to be sure of automatic promotion.

Gleghorn signed for Stoke City in October 1992 and made his debut in the Potteries derby against Port Vale in which Stoke won 2–1. Stoke went on to win the Second Division title in 1992–93 with Gleghorn playing a major role in the team's success. Manager Lou Macari left for Celtic and under Joe Jordan Gleghorn was restricted to a more defensive role in the side in 1993–94 a role which he did not enjoy. Once Macari returned to Stoke in 1994–95 Gleghorn returned to his more free role in the side and an improved Stoke side finished 11th in 1994–95. He was an ever-present in 1995–96 playing in 56 matches scoring ten goals as Stoke reached the play-offs where they lost to Leicester City. He was released at the end of the season with the club looking to reduce their wage bill ahead of their move to the Britannia Stadium and Gleghorn joined Burnley. He retired in 1998 after a season at Turf Moor and loan spells with Brentford and Northampton Town.

== Post-retirement ==
Once his full-time football career finished Gleghorn went to work full-time in the Sports Studies department of a further education college. Meanwhile, he involved himself with coaching and management. Following an unsuccessful few months as player-coach at Altrincham – though after he left the club went on to win the Northern Premier League – he joined Witton Albion in the Northern Premier League First Division as player-manager. In his first season the club finished level on points with the top two teams, missing out on promotion only on goal difference. He then had three years at Nantwich Town in the North West Counties League, leaving when they wanted him to take the job full-time, followed by runners-up spot in the same league with Newcastle Town, still as player-manager, from where he was sacked in 2006.

Though not currently managing a club, he runs his college football team who are on a successful run both girls and boys, runs courses for the Cheshire FA and works in talent identification for the Football Association. In August 2007 he made his broadcasting debut as a summariser for BBC Radio Manchester covering the matches of his former club Manchester City on Manchester Sports.

== Career statistics ==
Appearances and goals by club, season and competition
Club	Season	League			FA Cup		League Cup		Other		Total	
Club	Season	Division	Apps	Goals	Apps	Goals	Apps	Goals	Apps	Goals	Apps	Goals
Ipswich Town	1985–86	First Division	21	2	2	0	1	0	—		24	0
Ipswich Town	1986–87	Second Division	29	7	1	0	3	0	5 (Note: Three appearances and goal in Full Members' Cup and two appearances in Second Division play-offs)	1	38	8
Ipswich Town	1987–88	Second Division	16	2	1	0	1	0	4 (Note: Appearances in Full Members' Cup)	1	22	3
Ipswich Town	Total		66	11	4	0	5	0	9	2	84	11
Manchester City	1988–89	Second Division	32	6	1	1	2	2	1	1	36	10
Manchester City	1989–90	First Division	2	1	0	0	0	0	0	0	2	1
Manchester City	Total		34	7	1	1	2	2	1	1	38	11
Birmingham City	1989–90	Third Division	43	9	4	3	2	0	2 (Note: Appearances in Football League Trophy)	0	51	12
Birmingham City	1990–91	Third Division	42	6	2	0	2	0	8	1	54	7
Birmingham City	1991–92	Third Division	46	17	1	0	7	5	2	0	56	22
Birmingham City	1992–93	First Division	11	1	0	0	2	0	2 (Note: Appearances in Anglo-Italian Cup)	1	15	2
Birmingham City	Total		142	33	7	3	13	5	14	2	176	43
Stoke City	1992–93	Second Division	34	7	2	0	0	0	5	1	41	8
Stoke City	1993–94	First Division	40	3	4	0	4	1	6	1	54	5
Stoke City	1994–95	First Division	46	7	2	0	3	1	6	1	57	9
Stoke City	1995–96	First Division	46	9	2	0	3	0	5 (Note: Two appearances in First Division play-offs and three in Anglo-Italian Cup)	0	56	9
Stoke City	Total		166	26	10	0	10	2	22	3	208	31
Burnley	1996–97	Second Division	33	4	4	1	4	0	2	0	43	5
Burnley	1997–98	Second Division	1	0	0	0	0	0	0	0	1	0
Burnley	Total		34	4	4	1	4	0	2	0	44	6
Brentford (loan)	1997–98	Second Division	11	1	0	0	0	0	1	0	12	1
Northampton Town (loan)	1997–98	Second Division	8	1	0	0	0	0	0	0	8	1
Career total			461	83	26	5	34	9	49	8	570	105

== Honours ==
Manchester City

- Football League Second Division runner-up: 1988–89

Birmingham City

- Football League Third Division runner-up: 1991–92
- Associate Members' Cup: 1990–91

Stoke City

- Football League Second Division: 1992–93

Newcastle Town

- North West Counties League runner-up: 2005–06

Individual

- PFA Team of the Year: 1991–92 Third Division
