= Mike Sheron =

English footballer (born 1972)

Personal information
- Full name: Michael Nigel Sheron
- Date of birth: 11 January 1972 (age 54)
- Place of birth: Liverpool, England
- Position: Striker

Youth career
- Manchester City

Senior career*
Years	Team	Apps	(Gls)
1990–1994	Manchester City	100	(24)
1991	→ Bury (loan)	5	(1)
1994–1995	Norwich City	28	(2)
1995–1997	Stoke City	69	(34)
1997–1999	Queens Park Rangers	63	(19)
1999–2003	Barnsley	152	(33)
2003–2004	Blackpool	38	(8)
2004–2005	Macclesfield Town	26	(3)
2005	Shrewsbury Town	7	(2)
2005	Warrington Town	2	(0)
Total		490	(126)

International career
1992–1993	England U21	16	(4)
- * Club domestic league appearances and goals

Michael Nigel Sheron (born 11 January 1972) is an English football coach and former professional footballer who is under-23s head coach at Blackburn Rovers.

As a player, he was a striker who notably played in the Premier League for Manchester City and Norwich City. He also played in the Football League for Bury, Stoke City, Queens Park Rangers, Barnsley, Blackpool, Macclesfield Town and Shrewsbury Town. Sheron was capped by England at under-21 level.

== Career ==
Sheron started his career with Manchester City, whom he joined as a schoolboy. His first league appearance came in March 1991 on loan at Bury, for whom he played five times. His Manchester City debut came in the 1991–92 season in a match against Everton. Sheron made a total of 29 appearances over the course of the season, scoring seven times. The majority of Sheron's Manchester City appearances were in a striking partnership with Niall Quinn, particularly in the 1992–93 season when Sheron scored 14 goals. Following the arrival of Paul Walsh and Uwe Rösler in March 1994, Sheron's first team opportunities become limited, and in August 1994 he joined Norwich City for a fee of £1,000,000. His time at Norwich was not a happy one. Struggling with injuries, Sheron scored just two league goals for Norwich, and moved to Stoke City in October 1995 in a player exchange deal that took Keith Scott to Carrow Road. Sheron performed considerably better for Stoke, scoring 39 goals in 71 starts, including a brace in the last ever Potteries derby match at the Victoria Ground.

His success at Stoke prompted Queens Park Rangers to pay £2.75 million for his services. After 18 months at QPR, the club were facing financial difficulties, and as one of the highest wage earners, Sheron was sold to Barnsley for £1.5 million. Sheron spent four years at Barnsley, making more appearances for them than for any of his other clubs.

Towards the end of his playing career Sheron had short spells at several lower division clubs, playing for Blackpool, Macclesfield and Shrewsbury. At Blackpool he started the final as Blackpool won the 2003–04 Football League Trophy.

After leaving Shrewsbury, Sheron signed for Warrington Town of the Northern Premier League who he briefly played for before hanging up his boots to join the club's coaching staff.

== Coaching career ==
Sheron started his coaching career with Manchester City's Academy before moving to Bury where he served as Youth Team manager for three years. After a year working with Oldham Athletic, Sheron joined the coaching staff at Liverpool's Academy before making the switch to Rotherham United as academy head coach. In March 2015 he joined Blackburn Rovers as their Lead Youth Development Coach. In August 2019 Sheron was appointed head coach for Blackburn Rovers under 18s

== Personal life ==
Sheron is the uncle of Hartlepool United midfielder Nathan Sheron.

== Career statistics ==
Appearances and goals by club, season and competition
Club	Season	League			FA Cup		League Cup		Other (Note: Appearances and goals in the Football League Trophy, Football League play-offs, Full Members Cup)		Total	
Club	Season	Division	Apps	Goals	Apps	Goals	Apps	Goals	Apps	Goals	Apps	Goals
Manchester City	1990–91	First Division	0	0	0	0	0	0	0	0	0	0
Manchester City	1991–92	First Division	29	7	1	0	3	1	1	0	34	8
Manchester City	1992–93	Premier League	38	11	5	3	2	0	0	0	46	14
Manchester City	1993–94	Premier League	33	6	2	0	5	0	0	0	40	6
Manchester City	Total		100	24	8	3	10	1	1	0	119	28
Bury (loan)	1990–91	Third Division	5	1	0	0	0	0	2	0	7	1
Norwich City	1994–95	Premier League	21	1	4	2	4	1	0	0	29	4
Norwich City	1995–96	First Division	7	1	0	0	2	2	0	0	9	3
Norwich City	Total		28	2	4	2	6	3	0	0	38	7
Stoke City	1995–96	First Division	28	15	0	0	0	0	2	0	30	15
Stoke City	1996–97	First Division	41	19	1	0	4	5	0	0	46	24
Stoke City	Total		69	34	1	0	4	5	2	0	76	39
Queens Park Rangers	1997–98	First Division	40	11	2	0	0	0	0	0	42	11
Queens Park Rangers	1998–99	First Division	23	8	0	0	4	1	0	0	27	9
Queens Park Rangers	Total		63	19	2	0	4	1	0	0	69	20
Barnsley	1998–99	First Division	15	2	2	0	0	0	0	0	17	2
Barnsley	1999–2000	First Division	36	9	1	0	4	2	0	0	41	12
Barnsley	2000–01	First Division	34	1	1	0	5	5	0	0	40	6
Barnsley	2001–02	First Division	33	12	2	0	2	0	0	0	37	12
Barnsley	2002–03	Second Division	34	9	1	0	1	0	1	0	37	9
Barnsley	Total		152	33	7	0	12	7	1	0	172	34
Blackpool	2003–04	Second Division	38	8	2	0	3	0	7	3	50	11
Macclesfield Town	2004–05	League Two	26	3	3	1	1	0	3	0	33	4
Shrewsbury Town	2004–05	League Two	7	2	0	0	0	0	0	0	7	2
Career total			488	126	27	6	40	17	16	3	570	152

== Honours ==
Blackpool

- Football League Trophy: 2003–04

Individual

- PFA Team of the Year: 1996–97 First Division
