= Steve Leslie (footballer, born 1976) =

Scottish footballer

Personal information
- Full name: Steven Leslie
- Date of birth: 6 February 1976 (age 50)
- Place of birth: Dumfries, Scotland
- Position: Midfielder

Youth career
- Motherwell

Senior career*
Years	Team	Apps	(Gls)
- Clydebank
1994–1995	Stoke City	1	(0)
1995–2000	Queen of the South	83	(3)
–	Annan Athletic		
- * Club domestic league appearances and goals

Steven Leslie (born 6 February 1976) is a Scottish former footballer who played in the Football League for Stoke City.

== Career ==
Leslie was born in Dumfries. He was on the playing staff for Motherwell and Clydebank before joining English side Stoke City. He spent the 1994–95 at the Victoria Ground in that time Leslie made two substitute appearances for the "Potters", firstly in the Anglo-Italian Cup against AC Ancona and in the Football League against Portsmouth.

He returned to Scotland and played for hometown club, Queen of the South. He then joined Annan Athletic.

== Career statistics ==
Appearances and goals by club, season and competition
Club	Season	League		FA Cup		League Cup		Other^{[A]}		Total		
Club	Season	Division	Apps	Goals	Apps	Goals	Apps	Goals	Apps	Goals	Apps	Goals
Stoke City	1994–95	1	0	0	0	0	0	1	0	2	0	
Career Total		1	0	0	0	0	0	1	0	2	0	

A. The "Other" column constitutes appearances and goals in the Anglo-Italian Cup.
