= 1994–95 Stoke City F.C. season =

Stoke City
1994–95 season
- Chairman: Peter Coates
- Manager: Joe Jordan, Asa Hartford, Lou Macari
- Stadium: Victoria Ground
- Football League First Division: 11th (63 points)
- FA Cup: Third round
- League Cup: Third round
- Anglo-Italian Cup: Semi-final
- Top goalscorer: League: Paul Peschisolido (13); All: Paul Peschisolido (15)
- Highest home attendance: 20,429 vs Port Vale (22 April 1995)
- Lowest home attendance: 9,111 vs Millwall (29 April 1995)
- Average home league attendance: 12,839
Home colours

The 1994–95 season was Stoke City's 88th season in the Football League and 32nd in the second tier.

In the summer of 1994 manager Joe Jordan made a number of alterations to his squad with the best being the signing of Canadian Paul Peschisolido from Birmingham City. As the season started there was no change in the fans' relationship with Jordan and it came as no surprise when he resigned in September. Asa Hartford took the caretaker role until Lou Macari made a return from Celtic. His first match back saw Stoke beat West Bromwich Albion 4–1 and there were high hopes that it could spark a promotion push. Alas just one win from 13 matches (26 December to 21 March) saw Stoke finish in a mid table position of 11th.

== Season review ==
=== League ===
In the summer of 1994 Joe Jordan brought in Canadian Paul Peschisolido from Birmingham City in a deal which sent striker Dave Regis to St. Andrews along with £200,000. He also brought in Carl Muggleton (who was on loan last season), Keith Downing and John Dreyer. Everyone knew that the 1994–95 season was going to be a tough one and manager Jordan arranged a strenuous pre-season training camp in Scotland. The league programme started with a 1–0 victory over Tranmere Rovers but this was followed up with poor results which saw Stoke lose 4–0 back-to-back at Reading and then Bolton Wanderers. Shortly after that defeat at Bolton Jordan resigned which was unsurprising as he remained unpopular with the club's supporters.

Asa Hartford assumed the role of caretaker manager for a short time and in his four games in charge Stoke won three. On 30 September 1994 Lou Macari became the first manager to have a second spell at the club returning from Celtic. His first match back saw Stoke beat West Bromwich Albion 4–1 but a poor defeat against Luton Town in the next match saw his attentions turn to strengthening the squad. In came Kevin Keen, Ray Wallace and Lárus Sigurðsson as Stoke entered 1995 just out of the top group of teams. But just one win in 13 saw Stoke fall further behind and whilst there was no danger of dropping too greatly there was no hope of catching the promotion contenders and Stoke had to settle for a mid-table finish of 11th picking up 63 points.

=== FA Cup ===
Stoke didn't have to wait too long to come up against Joe Jordan who had returned to Bristol City and he was given a frosty reception by the supporters but his side managed to win the third round replay at the Victoria Ground 3–1.

=== League Cup ===
Stoke drew Fulham in the second round and after a 3–2 loss at Craven Cottage Stoke beat Fulham 1–0 and progressed via the away goals rule. In the next round Stoke lost to eventual winners Liverpool, 2–1 at Anfield.

== Final league table ==
| Pos | Team | Pld | W | D | L | GF | GA | GD | Pts |
|---|---|---|---|---|---|---|---|---|---|
| 9 | Derby County | 46 | 18 | 12 | 16 | 66 | 51 | +15 | 66 |
| 10 | Grimsby Town | 46 | 17 | 14 | 15 | 62 | 56 | +6 | 65 |
| 11 | Stoke City | 46 | 16 | 15 | 15 | 50 | 53 | −3 | 63 |
| 12 | Millwall | 46 | 16 | 14 | 16 | 60 | 60 | 0 | 62 |
| 13 | Southend United | 46 | 18 | 8 | 20 | 54 | 73 | −19 | 62 |

Rules for classification: 1) Points; 2) Goals scored; 3) Goal difference

== Results ==
=== Legend ===
| Win | Draw | Loss |

=== Football League First Division ===
| Match | Date | Opponent | Venue | Result | Attendance | Scorers |
|---|---|---|---|---|---|---|
| 1 | 13 August 1994 | Tranmere Rovers | H | 1–0 | 15,915 | Gleghorn 49' |
| 2 | 20 August 1994 | Burnley | A | 1–1 | 15,331 | Dreyer 90' |
| 3 | 27 August 1994 | Sunderland | H | 0–1 | 13,159 | |
| 4 | 30 August 1994 | Reading | A | 0–4 | 7,103 | |
| 5 | 3 September 1994 | Bolton Wanderers | A | 0–4 | 11,515 | |
| 6 | 10 September 1994 | Southend United | H | 4–1 | 11,808 | Örlygsson 10', Edwards 13' (o.g.), Dreyer 47', Biggins 62' |
| 7 | 14 September 1994 | Charlton Athletic | H | 3–2 | 10,643 | Gleghorn 17', Örlygsson 22', Peschisolido 55' |
| 8 | 17 September 1994 | Notts County | A | 2–0 | 8,281 | Peschisolido (2) 31', 70' |
| 9 | 25 September 1994 | Derby County | A | 0–3 | 11,782 | |
| 10 | 2 October 1994 | West Bromwich Albion | H | 4–1 | 14,203 | Carruthers (2) 24', 87', Wallace 35', Peschisolido 68' |
| 11 | 9 October 1994 | Luton Town | H | 1–2 | 11,712 | Carruthers 80' |
| 12 | 15 October 1994 | Millwall | A | 1–1 | 7,856 | Peschisolido 55' |
| 13 | 22 October 1994 | Oldham Athletic | A | 0–0 | 8,954 | |
| 14 | 30 October 1994 | Wolverhampton Wanderers | H | 1–1 | 15,928 | Keen 17' |
| 15 | 2 November 1994 | Sheffield United | H | 1–1 | 11,556 | Gleghorn 77' |
| 16 | 5 November 1994 | Barnsley | A | 0–2 | 5,117 | |
| 17 | 19 November 1994 | Grimsby Town | H | 3–0 | 21,055 | Peschisolido (2) 23', 44', Carruthers 60' |
| 18 | 26 November 1994 | Watford | A | 0–0 | 9,126 | |
| 19 | 30 November 1994 | Portsmouth | A | 1–0 | 5,272 | Beeston 74' |
| 20 | 4 December 1994 | Oldham Athletic | H | 0–1 | 12,558 | |
| 21 | 10 December 1994 | Burnley | H | 2–0 | 13,040 | Örlygsson (2) 68' 83' (1 pen) |
| 22 | 17 December 1994 | Tranmere Rovers | A | 1–0 | 7,601 | Carruthers 81' |
| 23 | 26 December 1994 | Swindon Town | H | 0–0 | 17,662 | |
| 24 | 28 December 1994 | Bristol City | A | 1–3 | 8,500 | Cranson 83' |
| 25 | 31 December 1994 | Middlesbrough | H | 1–1 | 15,914 | Gleghorn 20' |
| 26 | 14 January 1995 | Wolverhampton Wanderers | A | 0–2 | 28,298 | |
| 27 | 4 February 1995 | Portsmouth | H | 0–2 | 9,704 | |
| 28 | 11 February 1995 | Sheffield United | A | 1–1 | 13,900 | Peschisolido 18' |
| 29 | 21 February 1995 | Grimsby Town | A | 0–0 | 6,384 | |
| 30 | 25 February 1995 | West Bromwich Albion | A | 3–1 | 16,591 | Scott 34', Peschisolido (2) 65', 80' |
| 31 | 4 March 1995 | Derby County | H | 0–0 | 13,462 | |
| 32 | 11 March 1995 | Sunderland | A | 0–1 | 12,282 | |
| 33 | 14 March 1995 | Port Vale | A | 1–1 | 19,510 | Sandford 33' |
| 34 | 18 March 1995 | Reading | H | 0–1 | 14,121 | |
| 35 | 21 March 1995 | Southend United | A | 2–4 | 4,240 | Allen 48', Biggins 59' (pen) |
| 36 | 25 March 1995 | Notts County | H | 2–1 | 10,204 | Gleghorn 13', Sturridge 77' |
| 37 | 1 April 1995 | Charlton Athletic | A | 0–0 | 10,008 | |
| 38 | 4 April 1995 | Watford | H | 1–0 | 9,578 | Sigurðsson 43' |
| 39 | 8 April 1995 | Middlesbrough | A | 1–2 | 20,867 | Peschisolido 30' |
| 40 | 12 April 1995 | Barnsley | H | 0–0 | 10,752 | |
| 41 | 15 April 1995 | Bristol City | H | 2–1 | 10,172 | Andrade 27', Peschisolido 89' |
| 42 | 17 April 1995 | Swindon Town | A | 1–0 | 10,549 | Örlygsson 35' |
| 43 | 22 April 1995 | Port Vale | H | 0–1 | 20,429 | |
| 44 | 29 April 1995 | Millwall | H | 4–3 | 9,111 | Scott 15', Gleghorn (2) 39', 65' Keen 90' |
| 45 | 3 May 1995 | Bolton Wanderers | H | 1–1 | 15,557 | Örlygsson 12' (pen) |
| 46 | 7 May 1995 | Luton Town | A | 3–2 | 8,252 | Örlygsson 52', Peschisolido 79', Scott 87' |

=== FA Cup ===
| Round | Date | Opponent | Venue | Result | Attendance | Scorers |
|---|---|---|---|---|---|---|
| R3 | 7 January 1995 | Bristol City | A | 0–0 | 9,683 | |
| R3 Replay | 18 January 1995 | Bristol City | H | 1–3 | 11,579 | Scott 17' |

=== League Cup ===
| Round | Date | Opponent | Venue | Result | Attendance | Scorers |
|---|---|---|---|---|---|---|
| R2 1st Leg | 20 September 1994 | Fulham | A | 2–3 | 3,721 | Örlygsson 69' (pen), Gleghorn 70' |
| R2 2nd Leg | 29 September 1994 | Fulham | H | 1–0 | 7,440 | Peschisolido 2' |
| R3 | 25 October 1994 | Liverpool | A | 1–2 | 32,060 | Peschisolido 41' |

=== Anglo-Italian Cup ===
| Round | Date | Opponent | Venue | Result | Attendance | Scorers |
|---|---|---|---|---|---|---|
| Group Match 1 | 24 August 1994 | Cesena | A | 2–0 | 1,139 | Clark 38', Carruthers 76' |
| Group Match 2 | 6 September 1994 | Ancona | H | 1–1 | 3,380 | Biggins 50' |
| Group Match 3 | 5 October 1994 | Udinese | A | 3–1 | 1,200 | Downing 69', Biggins 73', Butler 74' |
| Group Match 4 | 15 November 1994 | Piacenza | H | 4–0 | 7,240 | Butler 12', Carruthers (2) 37', 50', Gleghorn 85' |
| Semi Final 1st leg | 24 January 1995 | Notts County | A | 0–0 | 5,134 | |
| Semi Final 2nd leg | 31 January 1995 | Notts County | H | 0–0 (2–3 pens) | 10,741 | |

=== Friendlies ===
| Match | Opponent | Venue | Result |
|---|---|---|---|
| 1 | Clevedon Town | A | 2–0 |
| 2 | Newcastle Town | A | 4–0 |
| 3 | Skoda Xanthi | H | 2–3 |
| 4 | Brechin City | A | 4–0 |
| 5 | Dundee United | A | 1–4 |

== Squad statistics ==
| Pos. | Name | League | | FA Cup | | League Cup | | Anglo-Italian Cup | | Total | |
| Pos. | Name | Apps | Goals | Apps | Goals | Apps | Goals | Apps | Goals | Apps | Goals |
|---|---|---|---|---|---|---|---|---|---|---|---|
| GK | (England) Carl Muggleton | 24 | 0 | 0 | 0 | 3 | 0 | 4 | 0 | 31 | 0 |
| GK | (Scotland) Ronnie Sinclair | 22(2) | 0 | 2 | 0 | 0 | 0 | 2 | 0 | 26(2) | 0 |
| DF | (England) Mark Bailey | 0 | 0 | 0 | 0 | 0 | 0 | 0 | 0 | 0 | 0 |
| DF | (England) John Butler | 38(3) | 0 | 2 | 0 | 3 | 0 | 4(1) | 2 | 47(4) | 2 |
| DF | (Scotland) John Clark | 5 | 0 | 0 | 0 | 0 | 0 | 1 | 1 | 6 | 1 |
| DF | (England) Ian Clarkson | 15(3) | 0 | 2 | 0 | 1 | 0 | 3(1) | 0 | 21(4) | 0 |
| DF | (England) Ian Cranson | 37 | 1 | 2 | 0 | 3 | 0 | 5 | 0 | 47 | 1 |
| DF | (England) John Dreyer | 16(2) | 2 | 0 | 0 | 2 | 0 | 3 | 0 | 21(2) | 2 |
| DF | (England) Graham Potter | 1 | 0 | 0 | 0 | 0(1) | 0 | 0 | 0 | 1(1) | 0 |
| DF | (England) Lee Sandford | 34(1) | 1 | 2 | 0 | 3 | 0 | 6 | 0 | 45(1) | 1 |
| DF | (Iceland) Lárus Sigurðsson | 22(1) | 1 | 0(1) | 0 | 0 | 0 | 0 | 0 | 22(2) | 1 |
| DF | (England) Ray Wallace | 16(4) | 1 | 1 | 0 | 1 | 0 | 6 | 0 | 24(4) | 1 |
| MF | (England) Paul Allen | 17 | 1 | 0 | 0 | 0 | 0 | 2 | 0 | 19 | 1 |
| MF | (Cape Verde) José Andrade | 2(2) | 1 | 0 | 0 | 0 | 0 | 0 | 0 | 2(2) | 1 |
| MF | (England) Carl Beeston | 15(1) | 1 | 0 | 0 | 1 | 0 | 1 | 0 | 17(1) | 1 |
| MF | (England) Keith Downing | 16 | 0 | 1 | 0 | 2 | 0 | 3(2) | 1 | 22(2) | 1 |
| MF | (England) Nigel Gleghorn | 44(2) | 7 | 2 | 0 | 3 | 1 | 6 | 1 | 55(2) | 9 |
| MF | (Scotland) Gary Holt | 0 | 0 | 0 | 0 | 0 | 0 | 0 | 0 | 0 | 0 |
| MF | (England) Kevin Keen | 15(6) | 2 | 0 | 0 | 0 | 0 | 0 | 0 | 15(6) | 2 |
| MF | (Scotland) Steve Leslie | 0(1) | 0 | 0 | 0 | 0 | 0 | 0(1) | 0 | 0(2) | 0 |
| MF | (Iceland) Toddy Orlygsson | 38 | 7 | 2 | 0 | 3 | 1 | 1 | 0 | 44 | 8 |
| MF | (England) Vince Overson | 33(2) | 0 | 2 | 0 | 1 | 0 | 5 | 0 | 41(2) | 0 |
| FW | (England) Jason Beckford | 2(2) | 0 | 0 | 0 | 0 | 0 | 1 | 0 | 3(2) | 0 |
| FW | (England) Wayne Biggins | 8(9) | 2 | 0 | 0 | 1(1) | 0 | 3(1) | 2 | 12(11) | 4 |
| FW | (England) Martin Carruthers | 26(6) | 5 | 0(1) | 0 | 3 | 0 | 4(2) | 3 | 33(9) | 8 |
| FW | (England) John Gayle | 1(3) | 0 | 0 | 0 | 0 | 0 | 2 | 0 | 3(3) | 0 |
| FW | (Canada) Paul Peschisolido | 39(1) | 13 | 2 | 0 | 3 | 2 | 3(1) | 0 | 47(2) | 15 |
| FW | (England) Keith Scott | 16(2) | 3 | 2 | 1 | 0 | 0 | 0 | 0 | 18(2) | 4 |
| FW | (England) Graham Shaw | 1(2) | 0 | 0 | 0 | 0 | 0 | 0(1) | 0 | 1(3) | 0 |
| FW | (England) Simon Sturridge | 2(6) | 1 | 0(1) | 0 | 0 | 0 | 1(1) | 0 | 3(8) | 1 |
| FW | (England) Shaun Wade | 0(1) | 0 | 0 | 0 | 0 | 0 | 0 | 0 | 0(1) | 0 |
| FW | (England) John Williams | 1(3) | 0 | 0 | 0 | 0 | 0 | 0 | 0 | 1(3) | 0 |
| – | Own goals | – | 1 | – | 0 | – | 0 | – | 0 | – | 1 |
