= Martin Thomas (footballer, born 1959) =

Welsh footballer (born 1959)

Personal information
- Full name: Martin Richard Thomas
- Date of birth: 28 November 1959 (age 66)
- Place of birth: Senghenydd, Wales
- Position: Goalkeeper

Youth career
- 1975–1977: Bristol Rovers

Senior career*
Years	Team	Apps	(Gls)
1977–1983	Bristol Rovers	162	(0)
1982	→ Cardiff City (loan)	15	(0)
	→ Tottenham Hotspur (loan)	0	(0)
1983	→ Southend United (loan)	6	(0)
1983	→ Newcastle United (loan)	3	(0)
1983–1988	Newcastle United	115	(0)
1984	→ Middlesbrough (loan)	4	(0)
1988–1993	Birmingham City	144	(0)
	→ Aston Villa (loan)	0	(0)
1993	→ Crystal Palace (loan)	0	(0)
1993–1995	Cheltenham Town	80	(0)
Total		529	(0)

International career
	Wales U21	2	(0)
1986	Wales	1	(0)
- * Club domestic league appearances and goals

Martin Richard Thomas (born 28 November 1959) is a Welsh former footballer who made more than 500 appearances in the Football League as a goalkeeper and represented Wales at senior international level. After retiring as a player he became a coach, and has worked for various clubs and for the English Football Association.

== Playing career ==
Born in Senghenydd, Glamorgan, Thomas moved to England to join Bristol Rovers as a youth player. He made his début for their first team on 3 January 1977, as a substitute for Jim Eadie in the away match at Charlton Athletic. Thomas turned professional in September of that year, and went on to become Rovers' first-choice goalkeeper.

He faced competition for his jersey with England youth goalkeeper Phil Kite before going on loan to three clubs during 1982–83, first Cardiff City, then Tottenham Hotspur and Southend United. He left Bristol completely in 1983 to join Newcastle United for £50,000.

Thomas appeared regularly for Newcastle as they won promotion to the top-flight in 1984. He was the club's first choice goalkeeper for the 1985–86 and 1986–87 seasons. During the 1985–86 season he was part of the Newcastle side that lost a club record away defeat to West Ham United 8–1 a game which saw centre back Alvin Martin hit his only first class hat-trick in English professional football, against a three different goalkeepers. In September 1986, he won his first and only international cap for Wales, in a European Championship qualifier against Finland.

After a spell on loan to local rivals Middlesbrough, Thomas was sold to Division Two Birmingham City for £75,000 in October 1988. The club suffered relegation in 1989, but returned in 1992. He was part of the side that won the 1991 Associate Members' Cup Final. In 1993, after loan spells to Aston Villa and Crystal Palace, Thomas joined non-league club Cheltenham Town. He made 80 league appearances for the club before retiring as a player in 1995.

== Coaching career ==
Thomas earned a preliminary coaching certificate whilst playing at Newcastle, and supplemented this with further coaching badges during his time at Birmingham. He eventually earned the UEFA 'A' Coaching licence, taking a position within the Football Association in the early 1990s as a Regional Development Officer in the Midlands.

On a part-time basis, Thomas, with other professional goalkeepers, including Steve Ogrizovic, Paul Barron, and Andy Poole, helped train players aged 12–16 from clubs across the Midlands, in a time when clubs did not have goalkeeping-specific coaches.

In 1996, Thomas helped to coach England's under-16 goalkeepers, before joining the FA full-time in 1997, and has since remained part of the England youth coaching. In 1998 Thomas became part of the new Ray Clemence-headed goalkeeping department within the FA, which developed a structure for coaching goalkeeper coaches.

He was part of the England U21 coaching staff which took the team to the semi-finals of the 2007 UEFA under-21 championships.

== Honours ==
Birmingham City

- Associate Members' Cup: 1990–91
