= Dean Peer =

English footballer

Personal information
- Date of birth: 8 August 1969 (age 57)
- Place of birth: Wordsley, England
- Height: 6 ft 2 in (1.88 m)
- Position: Midfielder

Youth career
- Lye Town
- Stourbridge Falcons
- 1985–1987: Birmingham City

Senior career*
Years	Team	Apps	(Gls)
1987–1993	Birmingham City	120	(8)
1992–1993	→ Mansfield Town (loan)	10	(0)
1993–1995	Walsall	45	(8)
1995–1999	Northampton Town	119	(5)
1999–2000	Northampton Town	9	(1)
2000–2001	Shrewsbury Town	56	(0)
2001–2004	Moor Green		
2004–2005	Solihull Borough		
2005–20??	Evesham United		
- * Club domestic league appearances and goals

Dean Peer (born 8 August 1969) is an English former footballer who played as a midfielder for a variety of clubs in the Midlands. He made more than 350 appearances in the Football League. He was born in Wordsley, near Stourbridge, Staffordshire. Peer works as a physiotherapist in Wolverhampton since retiring from football.

== Honours ==
Birmingham City

- Associate Members' Cup: 1990–91

Northampton Town

- Football League Third Division play-offs: 1997
