= Time After Time (The Beloved song) =

Single by The Beloved

from the album Happiness
- B-side: "Remix"
- Released: 1990
- Genre: Electronic music; alternative dance; downtempo
- Length: 4:05
- Label: EastWest
- Songwriter: Jon Marsh
- Producer: Martyn Phillips

The Beloved singles chronology
"Your Love Takes Me Higher" (1990)	"Time After Time" (1990)	"It's Alright Now" (1990)

Music video
- "Time After Time" on YouTube

"Time After Time" is a song by British electronic music group The Beloved, released in 1990 by EastWest Records as the fifth and last single from their second album, Happiness (1990). Written by frontman Jon Marsh and produced by Martyn Phillips, the song peaked at number 46 on the UK Singles Chart.

== Critical reception ==
Pan-European magazine Music & Media described the song as "a melancholic sound that is actually very British. Dreamy synthesizers carry a repetitive tune that some might consider a bit too monotonous for a single. Brave choice." David Giles from Music Week stated, "The best track from the Happiness LP, which catches the duo in a rare soulful moment." He added, "Strong on melody and, because the vocals are subdued, it marks their final break from "indie" music. Whether it will sell – it is the fifth track from the album – remains to be seen."

== Track listing ==
- 7", Europe (1990)
1. "Time After Time" – 4:05
2. "Time After Time" (Through The Round Window) – 4:50
- 12" single, UK (1990)
1. "Time After Time" (Ross & Demelza) – 7:25
2. "Time After Time" (Muffin Mix) – 6:20
3. "Time After Time" (Through The Round Window) – 4:50
- CD single, Europe (1990)
1. "Time After Time" (7" Mix) – 4:11
2. "Time After Time" (Ross + Demelza) – 7:30
3. "Time After Time" (Through The Round Window) – 4:51
4. "Time After Time" (Three Men In A Tub) – 3:22
- CD maxi, US (1990)
1. "Time After Time" – 4:05
2. "Time After Time" (Ross & Demelza) – 7:25
3. "Your Love Takes Me Higher" (Chillum Willum) – 8:40
4. "Pablo" – 4:15
5. "Time After Time" (Muffin Mix) – 6:20
6. "Time After Time" (Three Men In A Tub) – 3:25

== Charts ==
Chart (1990)	Peak position
UK Singles (OCC)	46
