= Daniel Noble =

Dan or Daniel Noble may refer to:

- Daniel Noble (Medal of Honor) (1838–1903), American Civil War sailor
- Daniel Noble (New York judge) (1859–1937), American lawyer and judge
- Daniel Noble (physician) (1810–1885), English physician
- Daniel E. Noble (1901–1980), American engineer
- Dan Noble (1846–?), English-American thief and confidence man
- Dan Noble (footballer) (born 1970), English footballer
- Danny Noble (born 1989), American football player
