= Paul Baines =

Paul Baines may refer to:

- Paul Baines (academic) (born 1973), British marketing academic
- Paul Baines (footballer) (born 1972), former English footballer
