= David Bright =

David Bright is the name of:

- David Bright (diver) (1957–2006), American professional wreck diver
- David Bright (footballer) (born 1972), English footballer for Stoke City
- David Bright (football manager) (1956–2021), Botswana association football coach currently managing Bay United
- Dave Bright (born 1949), English-New Zealand footballer
