= Your Love Takes Me Higher =

1989 single by The Beloved

"Your Love Takes Me Higher (First release)"

Single by The Beloved

from the album Happiness
- B-side: "Paradise (My Darling, My Angel)"
- Released: 9 January 1989
- Recorded: 1988
- Genre: House music; dance-pop
- Length: 3:42
- Label: WEA
- Songwriter(s): Jon Marsh; Steve Waddington
- Producer(s): Paul Staveley O'Duffy

The Beloved singles chronology
"Loving Feeling" (1988)	"Your Love Takes Me Higher (First release)" (1989)	"The Sun Rising" (1989)

Music video
- "Your Love Takes Me Higher" on YouTube

"Your Love Takes Me Higher (Second Release)"

Single by The Beloved

from the album Happiness
- B-side: "Pablo"
- Released: March 1990
- Recorded: 1988
- Genre: House music; dance-pop
- Length: 3:42
- Label: WEA
- Songwriter(s): Jon Marsh; Steve Waddington
- Producer(s): Paul Staveley O'Duffy

The Beloved singles chronology
"Hello" (1990)	"Your Love Takes Me Higher (Second Release)" (1990)	"Time After Time" (1990)

Music video
- "Your Love Takes Me Higher" on YouTube

"Your Love Takes Me Higher" is a single by The Beloved. "Your Love Takes Me Higher" appears on the Happiness album. Remixes also appear on the Blissed Out album. The first release of the single came in a selection of formats and spent three weeks in the UK charts, only peaking at number 91. The single was re-released in 1990 and fared much better, reaching number 39 in the UK charts.

== Critical reception ==
Upon the 1989 release of the song, Robin Smith from Record Mirror wrote, "The cover picture looks as if these two have spent the night sleeping on a park bench, but 'Your Love Takes Me Higher' is a pulsating, fiesty little number with almost the same magnetism as the Pet Shop Boys' 'Left To My Own Devices'. One of this week's nice surprises." In their 1990-review of the song, Music & Media commented, "The Beloved are probably the most sophisticated of the post-house pop boom. They combine the thumping rhythms of that genre with an ability to manipulate atmospherics that meshes perfectly with the current nouveau hippy mentality. Add a dash of humour, a disciplined production and you have one of the best new bands around." David Giles from Music Week wrote, "Their blueprint is pretty sound, though the vocals let the whole thing down by being flat and indie-like rather than stirring and emotive. They've got a long way to go yet."

== Impact and legacy ==
British DJ and record producer John Digweed picked the song as one of his favourites in 1996, adding, "Great vocal, great mix [Calyx of Isis Mix]. Still in my box and still drops."

== Track listings ==
Original UK 7-inch single (1989)

1. Your Love Takes Me Higher
2. Paradise (My Darling, My Angel)

Original UK 12-inch single #1 (1989) (WEA YZ-357 T)

1. Your Love Takes Me Higher (the pod went pop) 8:13
2. Your Love Takes Me Higher (magic juan's sex) 6:10
3. Your Love Takes Me Higher (burning with dj desire) 5:12

Original UK 12-inch single #2 (1989) (WEA YZ-357 TX) ["Angelic Mixes"]

1. Your Love Takes Me Higher (deep joy) 7:10
2. Your Love Takes Me Higher (new beats for old) 2:25
3. Your Love Takes Me Higher (simply divine) 5:06
4. Your Love Takes Me Higher (divinely simple) 4:15

Original UK CD single (1989) CD3" (WEA YZ-357 CD)

1. Your Love Takes Me Higher 3:42
2. Paradise (My Darling, My Angel) 4:39
3. Your Love Takes Me Higher (rise up higher) 5:27
4. Your Love Takes Me Higher (beautiful) 6:18

Original US promo CD single (1989) CD5" (Atlantic PR2893-2)

1. Your Love Takes Me Higher 3:41
2. Your Love Takes Me Higher (deep joy) 7:20
3. Your Love Takes Me Higher (the pod went pop) 8:15

Re-released UK 7-inch single (1990)

1. Your Love Takes Me Higher
2. Pablo

Re-released UK 12-inch single #1 (1990) (WEA YZ-463 T)

1. Your Love Takes Me Higher (deep joy) 7:00
2. Your Love Takes Me Higher 3:37
3. Your Love Takes Me Higher (simply divine) 5:06
4. Your Love Takes Me Higher (rise up higher edit) 4:27

Re-released UK 12-inch single #2 (1990) (WEA YZ-463 TX)

1. Your Love Takes Me Higher (chillum willum) 8:40
2. Your Love Takes Me Higher (calyx of isis) 10:44

Re-released UK CD single (1990) CD5" (WEA YZ-463 CD)

1. Your Love Takes Me Higher 3:40
2. Your Love Takes Me Higher (deep joy - early fade) 6:59
3. Pablo (special k dub) 5:01
4. Your Love Takes Me Higher (divinely simple) 4:15

== Charts ==
Chart (1989)	Peak position
UK Singles (OCC)	91

Chart (1990)	Peak position
Australia (ARIA)	148
Europe (Eurochart Hot 100)	94
UK Singles (OCC)	39
