= Satellite (The Beloved song) =

Single by The Beloved

from the album X
- B-side: "Satellite (Transformer Vocal)"
- Released: 16 March 1996
- Recorded: 1995
- Genre: House; techno
- Length: 4:15
- Label: EastWest
- Songwriters: Jon Marsh; Helena Marsh
- Producers: Jon Marsh; Helena Marsh

The Beloved singles chronology
"Sweet Harmony" (1993)	"Satellite" (1996)	"Deliver Me" (1996)

Music video
- "Satellite" on YouTube

"Satellite" is a song by British band the Beloved, released on March 16, 1996, by EastWest Records as the first single from the band's fifth album, X (1996). It is written by frontman John Marsh with his wife, Helena Marsh, and became the biggest hit from the album, peaking at No. 19 on the UK Singles Chart and No. 6 on the UK Dance Singles Chart.

== Critical reception ==
Jon O'Brien from AllMusic described the song as "anthemic", "Italo house-inspired" and a valiant attempt "at a more experimental sound". Ross Jones from The Guardian commented, "The Beloved here spray us with the very essence of New Age techno friskiness. You may think you've heard it before, but the Beloved songs are like massages in more ways than one – no two are ever the same." Kevin Courtney from Irish Times felt it's "a typical Beloved bliss out, with a bit of strident Euro piano thrown in to overcome any lingering inhibitions."

Daisy & Havoc from Music Week's RM Dance Update gave "Satellite" top score with five out of five, writing, "As so much house music concentrates on being dross and proud of it, the sweet sounds of The Beloved become ever more necessary for national sanity. This is a pretty up and jumping track (well...in Beloved terms) with some especially good backing vocals worked in here, there and everywhere." Another RM editor, James Hamilton declared it as a "drily drawled frisky fluttering pop jiggler".

== Music video ==
In a similar style to the music video for their earlier single "Sweet Harmony", the video of "Satellite" consisted of a naked Jon Marsh, Helena Marsh, and a posse of other equally naked females lipsynching the lyrics. Kevin Courtney from Irish Times commented on the video, "The Beloved have a fetish for sitting around naked in their videos with a host of perfectly formed extras, and the video for 'Satellite' (EastWest) goes one step further by having the entire cast stand up and dance in the buff. Can't wait to see that one."

== Track listings ==
- CD single
1. "Satellite" — 4:15
2. "Satellite" (Transformer Vocal) — 8:26
3. "Satellite" (Kundalini Rising) — 8:46
4. "Satellite" (Freedom Vocal) — 7:31
5. "Satellite" (High Lite Dub) — 6:56
- 12" single
1. "Satellite" (Transformer Vocal) — 8:26
2. "Satellite" (Transmission Dub) — 7:54
3. "Satellite" (Kundalini Rising) — 8:46
4. "Satellite" (Freedom Dub) — 5:09
- Double 12" promo
1. "Satellite" (Transformer Vocal) — 8:26
2. "Satellite" (Freedom Dub) — 5:09
3. "Satellite" (Body-Pella) — 1:28
4. "Satellite" (Kundalini Rising) — 8:46
5. "Satellite" (Royal Dub) — 6:24
6. "Satellite" (Release-A-Pella) — 0:59
7. "Satellite" (Freedom Vocal) — 7:31
8. "Satellite" (Transmission Dub) — 7:54
9. "Satellite" (High Lite Dub) — 6:56
10. "Satellite" (Full House) — 6:04
11. "Satellite" (Blackjack Beats) — 3:00

== Charts ==
Chart (1996)	Peak position
Australia (ARIA)	116
Estonia (Eesti Top 20)	9
Israel (Israeli Singles Chart)	7
Scotland (OCC)	17
UK Singles (OCC)	19
UK Dance (OCC)	6
UK Airplay (Music Week)	29
UK Club Chart (Music Week)	7
