= Vince Hilaire =

English footballer (born 1959)

Personal information
- Full name: Vincent Mark Hilaire
- Date of birth: 10 October 1959 (age 67)
- Place of birth: Forest Hill, London, England
- Height: 5 ft 6 in (1.68 m)
- Position: Midfielder

Senior career*
Years	Team	Apps	(Gls)
1977–1984	Crystal Palace	255	(29)
1982	→ San Jose Earthquakes (loan)	22	(1)
1984	Luton Town	6	(0)
1984–1988	Portsmouth	146	(25)
1988–1989	Leeds United	44	(6)
1989–1990	→ Stoke City (loan)	5	(1)
1990–1991	Stoke City	10	(2)
1991–1992	Exeter City	33	(4)
1992–1993	Waterlooville	27	(3)
Total		548	(71)

International career
1977–1978	England Youth	8	(1)
1979–1982	England U21	9	(1)
1979	England B	1	(1)
- * Club domestic league appearances and goals

Vincent Mark Hilaire (born 10 October 1959) is an English retired professional footballer who played in the Football League for Crystal Palace, Luton Town, Portsmouth, Leeds United, Stoke City and Exeter City. He was one of the first established black players in English football.

== Career ==
Hilaire began his career with Crystal Palace as a 17-year-old in a 3–2 defeat at Lincoln City in March 1977 and rose to prominence with the side prophesied to be the "Team of the Eighties" after winning the Second Division championship title in 1978–79. He made 255 league appearances for Crystal Palace, scoring 29 goals, and was Supporters 'Player of The Year' in 1979 and 1980. He also played one summer season in the NASL with the San Jose Earthquakes in 1982.

He joined Luton Town in July 1984 but made only six appearances before being transferred to Portsmouth a few months later in November 1984, where he made 146 appearances, scoring 25 goals. He moved to Leeds United in the summer of 1988, playing 51 games and scoring seven goals, then moved on to Stoke City in November 1989 on loan, joining them on a permanent transfer in November 1990. He later joined Exeter City in 1991 where he made 33 appearances, scoring four goals, in the 1991–92 season. He joined Southern League side Waterlooville in the summer of 1992, as joint player-manager along with his ex-Palace teammate Billy Gilbert, but he left the club and retired from football before the end of the season, leaving Gilbert as sole player-manager. He won international caps for England Youth, B and U21, and although he was a regular contender for senior international honours, he never quite made the full England squad.

He was a professional footballer at a time when racism was rife in English football. He said about a match at Vale Park in 1976, "After about 20 minutes, the manager, then Terry Venables, told me to go and have a warm-up. I came out of the dug-out, and I started jogging around the touchline. I couldn't believe the abuse that was coming at me... animal noises and all the names you think of calling a black person. Any name under the sun. And it frightened me a bit, so I couldn't wait to get back in the dug-out. And I thought, 'Well, if this is the sort of reception I'm going to get, then I don't really want to know'".

== Personal life ==
Hilaire was name checked in the 1989 single by electronic band The Beloved in their Top 20 single "Hello".

His autobiography, Vince, was released in early 2018, co-written with Tom Masalona.

== Career statistics ==
Club	Season	League			FA Cup		League Cup		Other^{[A]}		Total	
Club	Season	Division	Apps	Goals	Apps	Goals	Apps	Goals	Apps	Goals	Apps	Goals
Crystal Palace	1976–77	Third Division	3	0	0	0	0	0	0	0	3	0
Crystal Palace	1977–78	Second Division	30	2	0	0	2	0	0	0	32	2
Crystal Palace	1978–79	Second Division	31	6	2	0	4	0	0	0	37	6
Crystal Palace	1979–80	First Division	42	5	3	1	3	1	0	0	48	7
Crystal Palace	1980–81	First Division	31	4	0	0	2	0	0	0	33	4
Crystal Palace	1981–82	Second Division	36	5	5	2	3	0	0	0	44	7
Crystal Palace	1982–83	Second Division	42	5	4	0	5	1	0	0	51	6
Crystal Palace	1983–84	Second Division	40	2	3	0	2	2	0	0	45	4
Crystal Palace	Total		255	29	17	3	21	4	0	0	293	36
San Jose Earthquakes (loan)	1982	NASL	22	1	—		—		—		22	1
Luton Town	1984–85	First Division	6	0	0	0	3	0	0	0	9	0
Portsmouth	1984–85	Second Division	26	7	2	0	0	0	0	0	28	7
Portsmouth	1985–86	Second Division	41	8	2	0	7	0	2	0	52	8
Portsmouth	1986–87	Second Division	41	8	2	0	3	0	4	2	50	10
Portsmouth	1987–88	First Division	38	2	4	0	2	0	0	0	44	2
Portsmouth	Total		146	25	10	0	12	0	6	2	174	27
Leeds United	1988–89	Second Division	42	6	2	0	3	1	2	0	49	7
Leeds United	1989–90	Second Division	2	0	0	0	0	0	0	0	2	0
Leeds United	Total		44	6	2	0	3	1	2	0	51	7
Stoke City	1989–90	Second Division	5	1	0	0	0	0	0	0	5	1
Stoke City	1990–91	Third Division	10	2	1	0	0	0	1	0	12	2
Stoke City	Total		15	3	1	0	0	0	1	0	17	3
Exeter City	1991–92	Third Division	33	4	4	0	0	0	3	0	40	4
Career Total			521	68	34	3	39	5	12	2	606	78

A. The "Other" column constitutes appearances and goals in the Full Members Cup, Football League Trophy.
