= John Butler (footballer, born 1962) =

English footballer

Personal information
- Full name: John Edward Butler
- Date of birth: 7 February 1962 (age 64)
- Place of birth: Liverpool, England
- Height: 5 ft 9 in (1.75 m)
- Position: Right back

Senior career*
| Years | Team | Apps | (Gls) |
| 1980–1981 | Prescot Cables | | |
| 1981–1988 | Wigan Athletic | 245 | (14) |
| 1988–1995 | Stoke City | 262 | (7) |
| 1995–1997 | Wigan Athletic | 57 | (1) |
| 1997 | Stalybridge Celtic | 4 | (0) |
| Total | | 568 | (22) |
- * Club domestic league appearances and goals

John Edward Butler (born 7 February 1962) is an English former association footballer who played in the Football League. With Wigan Athletic he won promotion from English football's divisional fourth tier in 1982, and as divisional champions in 1997. He was 1983-84 Wigan player of the season. With Stoke City he won the 1991-92 Football League Trophy and was promoted as 3rd tier divisional champions in 1993. A durable and versatile player, he amassed over 300 games for both clubs in his career 687 senior competitive first team appearances. He played in all 11 positions on the pitch during his 16-season professional footballer career. His specialist position was right back.

== Career ==
=== Early years ===
Butler was born in Liverpool and grew up in the Wavertree area with his mother, step father, three brothers and one sister. He played football at non-league side Prescot Cables to whom he was introduced by Jimmy Wield, the man Butler cites as the person to give him a career as a professional footballer. Butler was being scouted by Liverpool with Geoff Twentyman and Tom Saunders scheduled to watch him. However the game in question was cancelled and Wigan Athletic seized the opportunity with assistant manager Harry McNally offering Butler terms the day after.

=== Wigan Athletic ===
Joining at Christmas at the age of 19 and soon establishing himself in the first team, Butler enjoyed success in his first season. In 1981–82 in English football under the management of Larry Lloyd, Wigan were promoted from the fourth to the third tier. The "Latics" finished third behind Sheffield United and Bradford City. Butler's versatility saw him play in all eleven positions on the pitch in his Wigan career including goalkeeper when Nigel Atkins was substituted in a game due to injury. Butler was the club player of the year in 1984. The best run of his career in the two major domestic cups was reaching the quarter-finals in the 1986–87 FA Cup when Wigan were beaten 2–0 at home by Leeds United. His first spell at Wigan spanned seven seasons.

=== Stoke City ===
Mick Mills signed the then 26-year-old Butler for Stoke in 1988 for £100,000. He made his Stoke debut against Manchester City on boxing day and kept his place in the side for the remainder of the 1988–89 season. He became a key figure in the Stoke side in the early 1990s and only once in his six full seasons at Stoke did he fail to make over 40 first team appearances, 1990–91 when he still chalked up 37 first team games. He twice made over 50 first team appearances (1991–92 & 1992–93) and topped the club appearances chart outright in 1989–90 and jointly in 1991–92. Butler's first goal for Stoke came on 27 March 1989 in a 2–1 defeat away to Manchester City.

He picked up a winners medal from the 1991-92 Football League Trophy final at Wembley Stadium under the management of Lou Macari. The game was a 1–0 win against Stockport County before a crowd of 48,339. The same two sides were pitted against each other in the end of season divisional play-offs. County won the first leg 1–0 and in the second leg Stoke could only draw 1–1 and remained in the Third Division.

Butler and Macari enjoyed another success together when in 1992–93 in English football Stoke won the Second Division title. After a slow start Stoke soon began to start winning and by 21 November 1992 Stoke were top of the table and remained there for the rest of the season and promotion was secured with a record of 93 points. Stoke also went on a club record 25 League games without defeat. He spent two more season at the Victoria Ground in 1993–94 and 1994–95 before being handed a free transfer in June 1995. In total he served with Stoke City for seven seasons amassing 319 appearances scoring nine goals.

=== Return to Wigan Athletic ===
Now aged 33, Butler returned to Wigan in 1995 and ended his last season in football (the 16th of his career) with a success. In 1996–97 in English football under the management of John Deehan he helped them win the Third Division title on goal difference ahead of Fulham. After two seasons in his second spell at Wigan, Butler left senior football at the age of 35 to play for Stalybridge Celtic.

== Life after football ==
He lives in Ashton in Makerfield with his wife and remains a fan of football, particularly ex clubs Wigan and Stoke and also home town club Liverpool. Butler works as a driver for a courier company based in Golborne near Wigan.

== Career statistics ==
Appearances and goals by club, season and competition
| Club | Season | League | | | FA Cup | | League Cup | | Other | | Total | |
| Club | Season | Division | Apps | Goals | Apps | Goals | Apps | Goals | Apps | Goals | Apps | Goals |
|---|---|---|---|---|---|---|---|---|---|---|---|---|
| Wigan Athletic | 1981–82 | Fourth Division | 1 | 0 | 0 | 0 | 0 | 0 | — | | 1 | 0 |
| Wigan Athletic | 1982–83 | Third Division | 40 | 4 | 2 | 1 | 2 | 0 | — | | 44 | 5 |
| Wigan Athletic | 1983–84 | Third Division | 41 | 3 | 4 | 0 | 2 | 0 | 1 (Note: Appearances in the Football League Trophy) | 0 | 48 | 3 |
| Wigan Athletic | 1984–85 | Third Division | 45 | 3 | 4 | 0 | 4 | 0 | 6 | 0 | 59 | 3 |
| Wigan Athletic | 1985–86 | Third Division | 36 | 0 | 5 | 0 | 2 | 0 | 4 | 0 | 47 | 0 |
| Wigan Athletic | 1986–87 | Third Division | 36 | 0 | 3 | 0 | 2 | 0 | 3 (Note: One appearance in the Football League Trophy and two in Third Division play-offs) | 0 | 44 | 0 |
| Wigan Athletic | 1987–88 | Third Division | 26 | 1 | 2 | 1 | 4 | 0 | 2 | 0 | 34 | 2 |
| Wigan Athletic | 1988–89 | Third Division | 20 | 3 | 1 | 0 | 2 | 0 | 2 | 0 | 25 | 2 |
| Wigan Athletic | Total | | 245 | 15 | 21 | 2 | 18 | 0 | 18 | 0 | 302 | 17 |
| Stoke City | 1988–89 | Second Division | 25 | 1 | 0 | 0 | 0 | 0 | 0 | 0 | 25 | 1 |
| Stoke City | 1989–90 | Second Division | 44 | 0 | 1 | 0 | 2 | 0 | 2 (Note: Appearances in the Full Members' Cup) | 0 | 49 | 0 |
| Stoke City | 1990–91 | Third Division | 31 | 2 | 1 | 0 | 4 | 0 | 1 | 0 | 37 | 2 |
| Stoke City | 1991–92 | Third Division | 42 | 3 | 1 | 0 | 4 | 0 | 9 (Note: Seven appearances in the Football League Trophy and two in Third Division play-offs) | 0 | 56 | 3 |
| Stoke City | 1992–93 | Second Division | 44 | 1 | 2 | 0 | 4 | 0 | 5 | 0 | 55 | 1 |
| Stoke City | 1993–94 | First Division | 35 | 0 | 4 | 0 | 2 | 0 | 5 (Note: Appearances in the Anglo-Italian Cup) | 0 | 46 | 0 |
| Stoke City | 1994–95 | First Division | 41 | 0 | 2 | 0 | 3 | 0 | 5 | 2 | 51 | 2 |
| Stoke City | Total | | 262 | 7 | 11 | 0 | 19 | 0 | 27 | 2 | 319 | 9 |
| Wigan Athletic | 1995–96 | Third Division | 33 | 1 | 3 | 0 | 1 | 0 | 3 | 0 | 40 | 1 |
| Wigan Athletic | 1996–97 | Third Division | 24 | 0 | 1 | 0 | 0 | 0 | 1 | 0 | 26 | 0 |
| Wigan Athletic | Total | | 57 | 1 | 4 | 0 | 1 | 0 | 4 | 0 | 66 | 1 |
| Stalybridge Celtic | 1997–98 | Conference National | 4 | 0 | 1 | 0 | — | | 3 (Note: Two appearances and one goal in the Conference League Cup and one in Cheshire Senior Cup) | 1 | 8 | 1 |
| Career total | | | 568 | 22 | 37 | 2 | 38 | 0 | 52 | 3 | 695 | 27 |

== Honours ==
Wigan Athletic

- Football League Third Division: 1996–97
- Football League Fourth Division promotion: 1981–82

Stoke City

- Football League Second Division: 1992–93
- Associate Members' Cup: 1991–92

Individual

- Wigan Athletic Player of the Year: 1984
