= Cliff Carr =

English footballer

Personal information
- Full name: Clifford Paul Carr
- Date of birth: 19 June 1964 (age 62)
- Place of birth: London Borough of Hackney, England
- Height: 5 ft 5 in (1.65 m)
- Position: Defender

Youth career
- 1980–1982: Fulham

Senior career*
Years	Team	Apps	(Gls)
1982–1987	Fulham	145	(14)
1987–1991	Stoke City	124	(1)
1991–1992	Shrewsbury Town	1	(1)
1992	Telford United		
1992	Mansfield Town	20	(0)
1992–1994	Chesterfield	65	(1)
–	Telford United		
Total		355	(17)

International career
1985	England U21	1	(0)
- * Club domestic league appearances and goals

Clifford Paul Carr (born 19 June 1964) was a footballer who played in The Football League for Chesterfield, Fulham, Mansfield Town, Shrewsbury Town and Stoke City.

== Career ==
Carr was born in Hackney and started his career at Fulham's youth team and broke into the first team at Craven Cottage in 1982. He went on to be captain for the "Cottagers" and made over 150 first team games for the West London club and earned an England U21 cap in 1985. Fulham were relegated to the third tier in 1985–86 and after almost slipping to a second consecutive relegation Carr joined Stoke City for a fee of £45,000 in August 1987. He had a poor start to his Stoke career under Mick Mills and there was much speculation that he be quickly leaving but he improved in his performances and claimed the left back position and became a popular player with the Victoria Ground support. He played 50 times in 1987–88 and 46 times in 1988–89 during which time he scored his only goal for the "Potters" which came in a 4–0 win over Hull City on 13 November 1988. Injury prevented from playing in the first three months of the 1989–90 as Stoke ended up being relegated to the Third Division. The 1990–91 was an awful one for Stoke as they finished in their lowest ever league position, Carr making 22 appearances. In total he made 143 appearances for Stoke scoring once before being released by new manager Lou Macari.

After a brief spell at non-league Shrewsbury Town where he scored twice in two matches for the "Shrews" he played for non-league Telford United before joining Mansfield Town. He played 22 matches for the "Stags" in the 1991–92 helping them gain promotion to the Third Division and then joined their local rivals Chesterfield. Carr spent two seasons at Saltergate making 82 appearances scoring once. He then returned to Telford United where he ended his career.

== Career statistics ==
Appearances and goals by club, season and competition
Club	Season	League			FA Cup		League Cup		Other^{[A]}		Total	
Club	Season	Division	Apps	Goals	Apps	Goals	Apps	Goals	Apps	Goals	Apps	Goals
Fulham	1982–83	Second Division	6	1	0	0	1	0	0	0	7	1
Fulham	1983–84	Second Division	41	4	2	0	5	0	0	0	48	4
Fulham	1984–85	Second Division	38	4	1	0	3	1	0	0	42	5
Fulham	1985–86	Second Division	35	4	1	0	4	1	2	0	42	5
Fulham	1986–87	Third Division	25	1	0	0	0	0	2	0	27	1
Fulham	Total		145	14	4	0	13	2	4	0	166	16
Stoke City	1987–88	Second Division	41	0	2	0	3	0	4	0	50	0
Stoke City	1988–89	Second Division	41	1	3	0	1	0	1	0	46	1
Stoke City	1989–90	Second Division	22	0	1	0	0	0	2	0	25	0
Stoke City	1990–91	Third Division	20	0	0	0	1	0	1	0	22	0
Stoke City	Total		124	1	6	0	5	0	8	0	143	1
Shrewsbury Town	1991–92	Third Division	1	1	0	0	1	1	0	0	2	2
Mansfield Town	1991–92	Fourth Division	20	0	0	0	0	0	2	0	22	0
Chesterfield	1992–93	Third Division	42	1	2	0	4	0	5	0	53	1
Chesterfield	1993–94	Third Division	23	0	1	0	4	0	1	0	29	0
Chesterfield	Total		65	1	3	0	8	0	6	0	82	1
Career Total			355	17	13	0	27	3	20	0	415	20

A. The "Other" column constitutes appearances and goals in the Full Members' Cup and Football League Trophy.
