= Mark Devlin (footballer) =

Scottish footballer

Personal information
- Full name: Mark Andrew Devlin
- Date of birth: 18 January 1973 (age 53)
- Place of birth: Irvine, Scotland
- Position: Midfielder

Senior career*
Years	Team	Apps	(Gls)
- Kilmarnock Boy's Club
1990–1997	Stoke City	55	(2)
1997–1998	Exeter City	33	(2)
1999–2006	Northwich Victoria	222	(29)
Total		310	(33)
- * Club domestic league appearances and goals

Mark Andrew Devlin (born 18 January 1973) is a Scottish former footballer, who played in the Football League for Exeter City and Stoke City.

== Career ==
Born in Irvine, Devlin played football as a youngster with the Kilmarnock Boy's Club. He joined Stoke City in 1990 and played in 21 matches during the 1990–91 season where he scored 2 goals. He spent the next four seasons with the reserves and re-appeared for the first team in the 1995–96 and 1996–97 seasons.

After struggling to make an impact at the club, after seven years he left for Exeter City and finished his career playing for Northwich Victoria where he made 223 appearances. He made the second highest number of football league appearances for the non-league outfit.

== Career statistics ==
Appearances and goals by club, season and competition
Club	Season	League			FA Cup		League Cup		Other^{[A]}		Total	
Club	Season	Division	Apps	Goals	Apps	Goals	Apps	Goals	Apps	Goals	Apps	Goals
Stoke City	1990–91	Third Division	21	2	0	0	0	0	0	0	21	2
Stoke City	1991–92	Second Division	0	0	0	0	0	0	0	0	0	0
Stoke City	1992–93	Second Division	3	0	0	0	2	0	0	0	5	0
Stoke City	1993–94	First Division	0	0	0	0	0	0	0	0	0	0
Stoke City	1994–95	First Division	0	0	0	0	0	0	0	0	0	0
Stoke City	1995–96	First Division	10	0	0	0	0	0	4	0	14	0
Stoke City	1996–97	First Division	21	0	1	0	3	0	0	0	25	0
Stoke City	Total		55	2	1	0	5	0	4	0	65	2
Exeter City	1997–98	Third Division	33	2	0	0	0	0	1	0	34	2
Northwich Victoria	1999–2000	Football Conference	36	4	0	0	0	0	1	0	37	4
Northwich Victoria	2000–01	Football Conference	41	8	4	0	0	0	2	0	47	8
Northwich Victoria	2001–02	Football Conference	33	3	0	0	0	0	1	0	34	3
Northwich Victoria	2002–03	Football Conference	40	6	1	0	0	0	0	0	41	6
Northwich Victoria	2003–04	Football Conference	35	3	1	0	0	0	0	0	36	3
Northwich Victoria	2004–05	Football Conference	37	5	0	0	0	0	1	0	38	5
Northwich Victoria	2005–06	Football Conference	0	0	1	0	0	0	0	0	1	0
Northwich Victoria	Total		222	29	7	0	0	0	6	0	235	29
Career total			310	33	8	0	5	0	10	0	333	33

A. The "Other" column constitutes appearances and goals in the Anglo-Italian Cup and the Football League Trophy.
