= David Ritchie (footballer) =

English footballer (born 1971)

Personal information
- Full name: David Mark Ritchie
- Date of birth: 20 January 1971 (age 55)
- Place of birth: Stoke-on-Trent, England
- Position: Forward

Senior career*
Years	Team	Apps	(Gls)
1989–1990	Stoke City	0	(0)
1990	Stockport County	1	(0)
1990	Newcastle Town		
1990	Northwich Victoria		
1991	Kettering Town		
- * Club domestic league appearances and goals

David Mark Ritchie (born 20 January 1971) is an English former professional footballer who played in the Football League for Stockport County.

== Career ==
Ritchie was born in Stoke-on-Trent and played in the youth side at Stoke City. His father, John had previously spent 11 seasons at the Victoria Ground becoming the club's record goalscorer with 176. David was joined Stockport County in March 1990 having never made an appearance for Stoke. He only made one appearance for Stockport which came in a 2–1 win away at Hereford United on 17 March 1990. He later played for non-league sides Newcastle Town, Northwich Victoria and Kettering Town.

== Career statistics ==
Appearances and goals by club, season and competition
Club	Season	League			FA Cup		League Cup		Total	
Club	Season	Division	Apps	Goals	Apps	Goals	Apps	Goals	Apps	Goals
Stoke City	1989–90	Second Division	0	0	0	0	0	0	0	0
Stockport County	1989–90	Fourth Division	1	0	0	0	0	0	1	0
Career total			1	0	0	0	0	0	1	0
