= Darren Hope =

English footballer

Personal information
- Full name: Darren Hope
- Date of birth: 3 April 1971 (age 55)
- Place of birth: Stoke-on-Trent, England
- Position: Winger

Senior career*
| Years | Team | Apps | (Gls) |
| 1987–1988 | Newcastle Town | | |
| 1988–1990 | Stoke City | 0 | (0) |
| 1990–1991 | Stockport County | 4 | (0) |
| 1991–1994 | Stafford Rangers | | |
| 1994 | Newcastle Town | | |
| Total | | 4 | (0) |
- * Club domestic league appearances and goals

Darren Hope (born 3 April 1971) is an English former professional footballer who played in the Football League for Stockport County.

== Career ==
Hope was born in Stoke-on-Trent and began his career with Stoke City having joined from local non-league side Newcastle Town. He failed to break into the first team at Stoke and joined Fourth Division side Stockport County in March 1990 where he made four appearances. He went on to play for non-league sides Stafford Rangers and a return to Newcastle Town.

== Career statistics ==
Appearances and goals by club, season and competition
| Club | Season | League | | | FA Cup | | League Cup | | Total | |
| Club | Season | Division | Apps | Goals | Apps | Goals | Apps | Goals | Apps | Goals |
|---|---|---|---|---|---|---|---|---|---|---|
| Stoke City | 1989–90 | Second Division | 0 | 0 | 0 | 0 | 0 | 0 | 0 | 0 |
| Stockport County | 1989–90 | Fourth Division | 4 | 0 | 0 | 0 | 0 | 0 | 4 | 0 |
| Career total | | | 4 | 0 | 0 | 0 | 0 | 0 | 4 | 0 |
