= Gary Hackett =

English footballer (born 1962)

Personal information
- Full name: Gary Stuart Hackett
- Date of birth: 11 October 1962 (age 64)
- Place of birth: Stourbridge, England
- Height: 5 ft 8 in (1.73 m)
- Position: Winger

Senior career*
Years	Team	Apps	(Gls)
- Bromsgrove Rovers
1983–1987	Shrewsbury Town	150	(17)
1987	Aberdeen	15	(0)
1987–1990	Stoke City	73	(7)
1990–1993	West Bromwich Albion	44	(3)
1993–1994	Peterborough United	22	(1)
1994–1995	Chester City	35	(5)
1995–1997	Halesowen Town	70	(3)
Total		409	(36)

Managerial career
- 2001–2003: Bromsgrove Rovers (joint manager)
- 2003–2005: Stourbridge (joint manager)
- 2005–2019: Stourbridge
- * Club domestic league appearances and goals

Gary Stuart Hackett (born 11 October 1962) is a former footballer who played in the Football League for Chester City, Peterborough United, Shrewsbury Town, Stoke City and West Bromwich Albion.

== Career ==
Hackett was born in Stourbridge and began his career with non-league Bromsgrove Rovers before joining Football League side Shrewsbury Town. Hackett played regularly under Chic Bates helping the "Shrews" punch above their weight in the Second Division. After playing 174 times scoring 20 goals for Shrewsbury he joined Scottish Premier Division side Aberdeen in the summer of 1987. He spent the first half of the 1987–88 season at Pittodrie before moving back to England with Stoke City. Under the management of Mick Mills Hackett was an ever-present in 1988–89 playing all of the club's 52 fixtures that season as Stoke finished in a poor mid-table position of 13th. He was sold to West Bromwich Albion in March 1990 with Stoke destined for relegation to the Third Division.

He was never able to establish himself with the "Baggies" making 50 appearances in four seasons which ended with promotion in 1992–93. He ended his career with a season each at Peterborough United and Chester City before entering non-league football with Halesowen Town.

In 2003, Hackett was named co-manager of his hometown club Stourbridge alongside Jon Ford, but became the sole manager in 2005 with Ford as his assistant. Stourbridge won promotion to the Southern League Premier Division with two promotions in three seasons under Hackett's management, as well as reaching the FA Cup proper rounds for the first time in the club's history. In May 2019 Hackett announced he was resigning as manager after sixteen years in charge, following Stourbridge's defeat to Alvechurch in the Southern League play-off semi final.

== Career statistics ==
Appearances and goals by club, season and competition
Club	Season	League			FA Cup		League Cup		Other^{[A]}		Total	
Club	Season	Division	Apps	Goals	Apps	Goals	Apps	Goals	Apps	Goals	Apps	Goals
Shrewsbury Town	1983–84	Second Division	31	3	3	1	3	1	0	0	37	5
Shrewsbury Town	1984–85	Second Division	38	5	1	0	2	0	0	0	41	5
Shrewsbury Town	1985–86	Second Division	42	6	1	0	3	1	2	0	48	7
Shrewsbury Town	1986–87	Second Division	39	3	1	0	7	0	1	0	48	3
Shrewsbury Town	Total		150	17	6	1	15	2	3	0	174	20
Aberdeen	1987–88	Scottish Premier Division	15	0	2	0	3	0	2	0	22	0
Stoke City	1987–88	Second Division	1	0	0	0	0	0	0	0	1	0
Stoke City	1988–89	Second Division	46	5	3	0	2	0	1	0	52	5
Stoke City	1989–90	Second Division	26	2	1	0	2	0	2	0	30	2
Stoke City	Total		73	7	4	0	4	0	3	0	84	7
West Bromwich Albion	1989–90	Second Division	14	2	0	0	0	0	0	0	14	2
West Bromwich Albion	1990–91	Second Division	5	0	0	0	2	1	0	0	7	1
West Bromwich Albion	1991–92	Third Division	14	0	0	0	0	0	1	0	15	0
West Bromwich Albion	1992–93	Second Division	10	1	1	0	0	0	3	0	14	1
West Bromwich Albion	Total		44	3	1	0	2	1	4	0	50	4
Peterborough United	1993–94	First Division	22	1	0	0	5	0	1	0	28	1
Chester City	1994–95	Second Division	35	5	2	0	0	0	2	0	39	5
Career total			339	33	15	1	29	3	15	0	398	37

A. The "Other" column constitutes appearances and goals in the Anglo-Italian Cup, Full Members Cup, Football League Trophy, UEFA Cup.
