= 1989–90 Stoke City F.C. season =

Stoke City
1989–90 season
- Chairman: Peter Coates
- Manager: Mick Mills, Alan Ball
- Stadium: Victoria Ground
- Football League Second Division: 24th (37 Points)
- FA Cup: Third round
- League Cup: Second round
- Full Members' Cup: Second round
- Top goalscorer: League: Wayne Biggins (10); All: Wayne Biggins (11)
- Highest home attendance: 27,032 vs Port Vale (23 September 1989)
- Lowest home attendance: 8,139 vs Oxford United (10 April 1990)
- Average home league attendance: 12,499
Home colours

The 1989–90 season was Stoke City's 83rd season in the Football League and 30th in the Second Division.

The pressure was now on Mick Mills after four seasons without a serious promotion challenge and he spent big in the summer with £1 million worth of talent arriving at the Victoria Ground. However Stoke's overall performances left a lot to be desired and after failing to gain a victory until their 12th match Stoke hit the bottom of the table. With no improvement Mills paid the price and was sacked in November with former World Cup winner Alan Ball taking charge. Ball was unable to stop the slide into the third tier for only the second time in the club's history.

== Season review ==
=== League ===
After four seasons of mid-table finishes manager Mick Mills spent big to turn Stoke into a side capable of gaining promotion to the First Division. He spent good money, breaking the club's record transfer of £480,000 for Sheffield Wednesday defender Ian Cranson, £75,000 on Derek Statham from West Bromwich Albion, £175,000 for Ian Scott and £250,000 for Wayne Biggins both from Manchester City. All four started the first match of the season in a 1–1 draw at home to West Ham United in front of an expectant crowd of 16,058. The teams's overall displays, however, left a lot to be desired and favourable results proved elusive, Stoke failing to win any of their first 11 matches.

Injuries, refereeing decisions and a spate of draws saw Stoke hit bottom spot in November after collecting just two wins in 19. With the club heading towards the third tier for the first time since 1927 Mills paid the price for his failure and was dismissed. Into Mills' place came Alan Ball, a former World Cup winner with England, whose previous job was with Portsmouth. Ball was appointed as Mills' assistant two months earlier. He made an instant impact as Stoke beat Newcastle United on Boxing Day. But injury to Ian Cranson against Bournemouth in March put a dent in any hopes of a revival. Ball chose to wheel and deal in the transfer market in an effort to halt the club's slide. He had come to the conclusion that the squad he had inherited was simply not good enough and out went Chris Kamara, Dave Bamber, Leigh Palin, Carl Saunders, Gary Hackett and Nicky Morgan. Into the side came Tony Ellis, Lee Sandford, Tony Kelly, Dave Kevan, Paul Barnes and Noel Blake.

It was a big gamble by Ball to change the squad around so much so quickly and it did not pay off, Stoke staying rooted to the bottom of the table and they subsequently fell through the trap door into the Third Division for the first time since 1927. Stoke won only six of their 46 matches and scored just 35 goals, Biggins getting 10. With Stoke's fate already sealed over 3,000 fans travelled to Brighton & Hove Albion for the final away match to have a 'relegation party'. There were few bright spots during a dismal season which saw the Potteries derby make a return, 27,032 saw Stoke and Vale draw 1–1 on 23 September and at Vale Park 22,075 saw a dull 0–0 on 3 February.

=== FA Cup ===
Former fan favourites Steve Bould and Lee Dixon returned to the Victoria Ground with Arsenal and a crowd of 23,827 saw David O'Leary score the only goal of the tie.

=== League Cup ===
After beating First Division Millwall 1–0 in the first leg Stoke lost the second leg 2–0 with some controversial referring decisions going against Stoke which led to Mick Mills having to be restrained on the touchline.

=== Full Members' Cup ===
Stoke entered the Full Members' Cup for the final time and went out in the second round losing on penalties to Leeds United.

== Final league table ==
Pos	Team	Pld	W	D	L	GF	GA	GD	Pts	Qualification or relegation
20	West Bromwich Albion	46	12	15	19	67	71	−4	51	
21	Middlesbrough	46	13	11	22	52	63	−11	50	
22	Bournemouth (R)	46	12	12	22	57	76	−19	48	Relegation to the Third Division
23	Bradford City (R)	46	9	14	23	44	68	−24	41	Relegation to the Third Division
24	Stoke City (R)	46	6	19	21	35	63	−28	37	Relegation to the Third Division

Source: Statto
Rules for classification: 1) Points; 2) Goal difference; 3) Goals scored
(R) Relegated

== Results ==
=== Legend ===
Win	Draw	Loss

=== Football League Second Division ===
Match	Date	Opponent	Venue	Result	Attendance	Scorers
1	19 August 1989	West Ham United	H	1–1	16,058	Biggins 81'
2	26 August 1989	Portsmouth	A	0–0	7,433	
3	2 September 1989	Leeds United	H	1–1	14,570	Cranson 29'
4	5 September 1989	Barnsley	A	2–3	8,584	Berry 19' (pen), Morgan 58'
5	9 September 1989	Wolverhampton Wanderers	A	0–0	15,659	
6	16 September 1989	Oldham Athletic	H	1–2	10,673	Bamber 65'
7	23 September 1989	Port Vale	H	1–1	27,037	Palin 66'
8	26 September 1989	Bradford City	H	1–1	9,346	Cranson 55'
9	30 September 1989	Ipswich Town	A	2–2	10,389	Palin 47' (pen), Saunders 50'
10	7 October 1989	Plymouth Argyle	A	0–3	6,940	
11	14 October 1989	Hull City	H	1–1	9,955	Biggins 3'
12	17 October 1989	West Bromwich Albion	H	2–1	11,911	Hackett 8', Biggins 32'
13	21 October 1989	Sheffield United	A	1–2	16,873	Palin 67' (pen)
14	28 October 1989	Sunderland	H	0–2	12,480	
15	1 November 1989	Oxford United	A	0–3	4,375	
16	4 November 1989	Swindon Town	A	0–6	7,825	
17	11 November 1989	Brighton & Hove Albion	H	3–2	10,346	Beeston 1', Bamber 25', Kamara 30'
18	18 November 1989	Bournemouth	A	1–2	6,412	Hilarie 84'
19	25 November 1989	Leicester City	H	0–1	12,261	
20	2 December 1989	West Ham United	A	0–0	17,704	
21	9 December 1989	Barnsley	H	0–1	10,163	
22	26 December 1989	Newcastle United	H	2–1	14,878	Biggins 78', Beeston 90'
23	30 December 1989	Watford	H	2–2	12,228	Biggins (2) 23', 26' (1 pen)
24	1 January 1990	Middlesbrough	A	1–0	16,238	Ellis 61'
25	13 January 1990	Portsmouth	H	1–2	12,051	Sandford 70'
26	20 January 1990	Leeds United	A	0–2	29,318	
27	27 January 1990	Blackburn Rovers	A	0–3	9,132	
28	3 February 1990	Port Vale	A	0–0	22,075	
29	10 February 1990	Oldham Athletic	A	0–2	10,028	
30	17 February 1990	Wolverhampton Wanderers	H	2–0	17,870	Biggins 64', Hackett 75'
31	22 February 1990	Leicester City	A	1–2	12,242	Biggins 41'
32	3 March 1990	Bournemouth	H	0–0	10,998	
33	6 March 1990	Ipswich Town	H	0–0	10,815	
34	10 March 1990	Bradford City	A	0–1	9,269	
35	17 March 1990	Plymouth Argyle	H	0–0	9,452	
36	20 March 1990	Hull City	A	0–0	6,456	
37	24 March 1990	West Bromwich Albion	A	1–1	12,771	Ellis 78'
38	31 March 1990	Sheffield United	H	0–1	14,898	
39	7 April 1990	Sunderland	A	1–2	17,119	Ellis 63'
40	10 April 1990	Oxford United	H	1–2	8,139	Sandford 42'
41	14 April 1990	Middlesbrough	H	0–0	8,636	
42	16 April 1990	Newcastle United	A	0–3	26,190	
43	21 April 1990	Blackburn Rovers	H	0–1	9,305	
44	24 April 1990	Watford	A	1–1	8,073	Biggins 30'
45	28 April 1990	Brighton & Hove Albion	A	4–1	9,614	Ellis (2) 51', 76', Biggins 70', Scott 80'
46	5 May 1990	Swindon Town	H	1–1	11,386	Ellis 12'

=== FA Cup ===
Round	Date	Opponent	Venue	Result	Attendance	Scorers
R3	6 January 1990	Arsenal	H	0–1	23,827	

=== League Cup ===
Round	Date	Opponent	Venue	Result	Attendance	Scorers
R2 1st Leg	19 September 1989	Millwall	H	1–0	8,030	Morgan 32'
R2 2nd Leg	3 October 1989	Millwall	A	0–2	8,637	

=== Full Members' Cup ===
Round	Date	Opponent	Venue	Result	Attendance	Scorers
R1	28 November 1989	Bradford City	H	2–1	4,616	Berry 21', Bamber 40'
R2	19 December 1989	Leeds United	H	2–2 (4–5 pens)	5,792	Kamara 32', Biggins 95'

=== Friendlies ===
Match	Opponent	Venue	Result
1	Västra Frölunda IF	A	9–0
2	Alnö IF	A	3–1
3	Frösö IF	A	4–0
4	Anundsjö IF	A	1–0
5	Hamrånge GIF	A	7–0
6	Västerhaninge IF	A	8–0
7	Newcastle Town	A	2–0
8	Derby County	H	1–2
9	Everton	H	2–4
10	Walsall	H	2–0
11	Rocester	A	1–2
12	Stafford Rangers	A	3–0
13	Jersey Wanderers	A	7–0

== Squad statistics ==
Pos.	Name	League		FA Cup		League Cup		Full Members' Cup		Total	
Pos.	Name	Apps	Goals	Apps	Goals	Apps	Goals	Apps	Goals	Apps	Goals
GK	(England) Scott Barrett	7	0	0	0	0	0	0	0	7	0
GK	(England) Peter Fox	38	0	1	0	2	0	2	0	43	0
GK	(England) Dan Noble	1	0	0	0	0	0	0	0	1	0
DF	(Jamaica) Noel Blake	18	0	0	0	0	0	0	0	18	0
DF	(England) John Butler	44	0	1	0	2	0	2	0	49	0
DF	(England) Cliff Carr	22	0	1	0	0	0	2	0	25	0
DF	(England) Ian Cranson	17	2	0	0	2	0	0	0	19	2
DF	(England) Lee Fowler	13(2)	0	1	0	0	0	1	0	15(2)	0
DF	(England) Tony Gallimore	0(1)	0	0	0	0	0	0	0	0(1)	0
DF	(England) Andy Holmes	5(1)	0	1	0	0	0	1	0	7(1)	0
DF	(England) Chris Kamara	22	1	1	0	2	0	2	1	27	2
DF	(England) Lee Sandford	23	2	1	0	0	0	0	0	24	2
DF	(England) Derek Statham	19	0	0	0	2	0	0	0	21	0
DF	(England) Ian Wright	1	0	0	0	0	0	0	0	1	0
MF	(Wales) George Berry	15(1)	1	0	0	0	0	1	1	16(1)	2
MF	(England) Carl Beeston	38	2	1	0	1	0	1	0	41	2
MF	(England) Garry Brooke	6(2)	0	0	0	0	0	0	0	6(2)	0
MF	(Scotland) Stephen Farrell	0(2)	0	0	0	0	0	0	0	0(2)	0
MF	(England) Mark Higgins	4(2)	0	0	0	2	0	1	0	7(2)	0
MF	(Scotland) Dave Kevan	17	0	0	0	0	0	0	0	17	0
FW	(England) Darren Hope	0	0	0	0	0	0	0	0	0	0
MF	(England) Leigh Palin	17(2)	3	0	0	2	0	2	0	21(2)	3
MF	(England) Ian Scott	14(5)	1	0	0	0	0	0(1)	0	14(6)	1
MF	(Wales) Mickey Thomas	8	0	0	0	0	0	0	0	8	0
MF	(England) Paul Ware	9(7)	0	1	0	1	0	1	0	12(7)	0
FW	(England) Dave Bamber	20	2	0	0	2	0	1	1	23	3
FW	(England) Paul Barnes	4(1)	0	0	0	0	0	0	0	4(1)	0
FW	(England) Peter Beagrie	13	0	0	0	2	0	0	0	15	0
FW	(England) Wayne Biggins	35	10	1	0	0	0	2	1	38	11
FW	(England) Darren Boughey	4(3)	0	0	0	0	0	0	0	4(3)	0
FW	(England) Tony Ellis	24	6	0	0	0	0	0	0	24	6
FW	(England) Gary Hackett	18(8)	2	0(1)	0	1(1)	0	2	0	20(10)	2
FW	(England) Vince Hilaire	5	1	0	0	0	0	0	0	5	1
FW	(England) Tony Kelly	5(4)	0	0	0	0	0	0	0	5(4)	0
FW	(England) Nicky Morgan	6(7)	1	0	0	1	1	0(1)	0	7(8)	2
FW	(England) David Ritchie	0	0	0	0	0	0	0	0	0	0
FW	(England) Mark Sale	0(2)	0	0	0	0	0	0	0	0(2)	0
FW	(England) Carl Saunders	12(10)	1	1	0	0(1)	0	1	0	14(11)	1
FW	(Scotland) Mark Smith	2	0	0	0	0	0	0	0	2	0
