= Darren Boughey =

English footballer

Personal information
- Full name: Darren John Boughey
- Date of birth: 30 November 1970 (age 55)
- Place of birth: Newcastle-under-Lyme, England
- Position: Forward

Senior career*
Years	Team	Apps	(Gls)
1989–1992	Stoke City	7	(0)
1991	→ Wigan Athletic (loan)	2	(2)
1991	→ Exeter City (loan)	8	(1)
1991	→ Macclesfield Town (loan)	4	(0)
1992	Stafford Rangers		
Total		21	(3)
- * Club domestic league appearances and goals

Darren John Boughey (born 30 November 1970) is an English former footballer who played in the Football League for Exeter City, Stoke City and Wigan Athletic.

== Career ==
Boughey was born in Newcastle-under-Lyme and began his career with local side Stoke City. He broke into the first team towards the end of the 1989–90 season with Stoke already condemned to relegation to the Third Division. He played in seven league matches that season but in 1990–91 he found himself back in the reserves only playing in the League Cup and Football League Trophy. In January 1991, he joined Wigan Athletic on loan where he played twice for the "Latics" and scored twice before returning to Stoke. He then ended the season with Exeter City playing in eight matches for Terry Cooper's side scoring once. He was then released by Stoke and entered non-league football with Stafford Rangers.

== Career statistics ==
Appearances and goals by club, season and competition
Club	Season	League			FA Cup		League Cup		Other		Total	
Club	Season	Division	Apps	Goals	Apps	Goals	Apps	Goals	Apps	Goals	Apps	Goals
Stoke City	1989–90	Second Division	7	0	0	0	0	0	0	0	7	0
Stoke City	1990–91	Third Division	0	0	0	0	2	0	1 (Note: Appearances in Football League Trophy)	0	3	0
Stoke City	Total		7	0	0	0	2	0	1	0	10	0
Wigan Athletic (loan)	1990–91	Third Division	2	2	0	0	0	0	0	0	2	2
Exeter City (loan)	1990–91	Third Division	8	1	0	0	0	0	0	0	8	1
Macclesfield Town (loan)	1991–92	Football Conference	4	0	0	0	0	0	0	0	4	0
Career total			21	3	0	0	2	0	1	0	24	3
