= The Beloved (band) =

British band

- Origin: London, England
- Genres: Alternative dance; house; synthpop; post-punk (early)
- Years active: 1983–present
- Labels: Flim Flam Productions, Atlantic Records, Warner Bros., EastWest, WEA, New State Music
- Members: Jon Marsh
- Past members: Steve Waddington; Tim Havard; Guy Gausden; Helena Marsh

The Beloved are a British electronic music group best known for the singles "Sweet Harmony", "The Sun Rising", "Hello", "Your Love Takes Me Higher", and "Satellite".

Originally a post-punk/indie band formed in 1983, they underwent a change of direction in the late 1980s to a house/alternative dance sound and experienced chart success in the UK and elsewhere.

== History ==
=== Formation ===
According to a commonly known account of the group's formation, Jon Marsh placed an advertisement in the music press in 1983, which read as follows:

"I am Jon Marsh, founder member of The Beloved. Should you too wish to do something gorgeous, meet me in exactly three years' time at exactly 11 a.m. in Diana's Diner, or site thereof, Covent Garden, London, WC2".

However, Marsh confirmed in 2017 that this was a story made up for a press release.

Marsh first met Steve Waddington when he joined the band Twelfth of August as an additional guitarist. Within a few months, Marsh suggested they leave and start their own band. Calling themselves The Journey Through in 1983, they recruited bass player Timothy Havard and began writing and rehearsing; occasionally playing live, with keyboard player Bill Anderson. Waddington was singer and principal songwriter. By early 1984 they were The Beloved; Waddington still the frontman, but Marsh singing on several songs and Havard and Marsh beginning to take over most of the songwriting. By the autumn Marsh was the lead singer, still drumming on demos and in rehearsal. He waited outside the BBC, Portland Place one night and gave a demo tape to John Peel. Within a fortnight they had been booked for a session. Marsh's school friend, Guy Gausden, had played drums with them at a couple of gigs and they persuaded him to join as a permanent member. Having barely rehearsed, and with two brand new songs out of four, they debuted as a four-piece on BBC Radio 1 on 8 January 1985.

=== Initial indie success ===
A second Peel session followed in October 1985 and soon afterwards their first single, "A Hundred Words", was released in April 1986. A summation of this stage of their career can be found on a compilation album, Where It Is, which is a compilation of previously released material, consisting of singles and related B-sides, pressed onto one individual long playing work. The record includes all the early singles, "A Hundred Words", "This Means War", the double A-side "Surprise Me" / "Forever Dancing" and the EP "Happy Now", all released throughout 1986 and 1987, all making the top 30 in the UK Indie Chart, and all failing in the UK Singles Chart.

=== Change in direction and Happiness ===
Havard left the band in July 1987. The remaining three members began work on a new album. However, due to a lack of money to produce the album, it was shelved and Gausden departed in late 1987. Back down to a duo of Marsh and Waddington only, The Beloved began to embrace a dance sound more wholeheartedly after taking influence from freestyle and hip-hop music in "Forever Dancing". Now signed to WEA (now Warner Music Group), the single "Loving Feeling" was released in October 1988. It did not fare very well in the charts but its B-side "Acid Love" garnered moderate success in clubs. The single "Your Love Takes Me Higher" was released in January 1989 and did not chart but was more successful than "Loving Feeling", peaking at number 91 on the UK Singles Chart. In October of the same year the single "The Sun Rising" was released and became a club favourite, crossing over to the UK top 40, peaking at number 26 in November 1989.

This was followed in February 1990 by their first studio album, Happiness, the first and only album Marsh and Waddington released as a duo, and the first consisting wholly of previously unreleased new songs, from which the hit single "Hello" was also released. "Hello" became The Beloved's first international hit, and reached number 19 in the UK. This song's lyrics mostly consist of names of real or fictional people, groups and institutions, representing the band's wide-ranging selection of heroes, villains, and a few of their friends. Saint Peter and Saint Paul, house music with Kym Mazelle and Paris Grey; literature with Jean Paul Sartre rhymed with the writer and disgraced former politician Jeffrey Archer; talk radio with Brian Hayes and Marsh's childhood hero, Crystal Palace FC football player Vince Hilaire. The LP included two more singles, a re-release of "Your Love Takes Me Higher," which this time made the UK top 40, and the final cut, "Time After Time", which was only a minor hit in the UK, reaching number 48.

A brand new song, "It's Alright Now", which also failed to make the top 40, stopping at number 48 in the UK, was released to promote a remix album, titled Blissed Out, released in November 1990. Almost all of the songs from the Happiness album were featured on Blissed Out in one or more remixed versions, along with another mix of "It's Alright Now," and some previously exclusively non-album tracks. The work was released in three different editions, varying in length and track listing, depending upon the format. The vinyl LP, the shortest, includes 8 tracks; the CD version features 11 tracks; and the MC edition contains 16 tracks.

=== Further success: Conscience and X ===
"It's Alright Now" and Blissed Out were the last works made by Marsh with Waddington at the time. By 1991, Waddington had left the group, and they re-emerged in 1993 with Jon's wife Helena involved as co-writer and co-producer for a second studio album, Conscience. The band received airplay with the video of the first single, "Sweet Harmony," despite the entire cast being naked (shot and edited showing nothing that might cause it to be censored). One of the models in this video is television presenter Tess Daly. "Sweet Harmony", which was originally used to promote the second season of the popular American soap opera Melrose Place in several European countries, has since been used in advertising for British home improvement chain Homebase as well.

While "Sweet Harmony" went on to become their biggest hit in the UK, reaching number 8 in 1993, the other two tracks taken from the Conscience album, did not achieve the former's success. The double A-side single "Celebrate Your Life" / "You've Got Me Thinking" peaked at number 23, and "Outerspace Girl" peaked at number 38. "Rock to the Rhythm of Love" was also released as a single, however, only in the US. The album itself reached no. 2 on the UK Albums Chart.

After Conscience, a third studio album entitled X was released in 1996. Though the record peaked at number 25 in the UK Albums Chart, and three singles were released from it, only the first, "Satellite", made the top 20, peaking at number 19; while the second, "Deliver Me", failed to chart and was withdrawn shortly after release in the UK because of a lack of radio play – and the third, "Ease the Pressure", did not enter the UK top 40, stalling at number 43. To date, X is the last original album from the group. This album includes soundscapes by Robert Fripp.

=== Later activity ===
After X, the compilation Single File followed in 1997, promoted by a re-release of "The Sun Rising" (which reached number 31, only five positions lower than the original 1989 release) which included some new remixes.

Jon and Helena released several underground 12" singles in the following years under different names, including: "It's a Universal Thing" / "All That Jazz", "Stella Does Tricks" and "Density" (1998, 2000, 2001, as Adam & Eve); "Ride with Me" (1998, as Lucky Hole); "Baby Sheik" (1998, as The London Authority); and "King of Deep" / "Peking Dub" (2003, as Deepo King). Jon also released two further Beloved singles in 2000: "With You", a cover version of Sparks' 1981 song "When I'm with You", which was originally recorded for a tribute album, and "Timeslip".

Starting in the late 1990s, Marsh became a club DJ, holding monthly residencies at Ministry of Sound between 1994 and 1998, and Fabric between 1999 and 2004. He played across the UK and Europe and regularly featured in techno compilations by Fabric until he stopped in the late 2000s to focus more on his family. He has also collaborated with original band member Steve Waddington and others on new material, most of which remains unreleased.

== Digital releases and special editions ==
Marsh has been uploading the band's discography on streaming services such as Spotify throughout the late 2010s, including rare remixes that were previously only available on limited edition 12" records. In April 2019, the first single released under the Beloved name since 2000 was released for Record Store Day, "Your Love Takes Me Higher (Evil Mix)" / "Awoke", released by the band's new label New State Music. The first track was a previously unreleased remix of "Your Love Takes Me Higher" from 1988 and the second, "Awoke", was a previously unreleased and unnamed song from late 1990, intended for use on a direct follow-up to Happiness which was shelved. The single was only physically released on 12" vinyl and only had 1,500 copies pressed.

On 31 January 2020, a remastered re-release of Where It Is was released both on streaming platforms and as a 2-CD physical set. It contains 31 total tracks, with bonus demos and alternate versions of tracks, along with an extensive booklet containing previously unseen photos of and in-depth information on that incarnation of the band, written by Tim Havard. This re-release peaked at number 88 on the UK Physical Albums Chart. A similar re-release of Happiness was also released on 7 August 2020, with booklet notes written by Jon Marsh. This peaked at number 77 on the UK Albums Chart, number 8 on the UK Physical Albums Chart and reached number 1 on the UK Dance Chart.

== Collaborations with other artists or bands ==
Both Marsh and Waddington have collaborated with other artists or bands. Waddington co-wrote, co-produced, and contributed guitar to the System 7 track "Habibi". Marsh has contributed vocals to tracks from Laid and Luke Solomon, as well as remixing other artists including Depeche Mode. He also worked with Bent on "Beautiful Otherness" from their 2003 album The Everlasting Blink and We Watch the Stars, which was released in 2013. In 2020 Marsh provided vocals to "Sky's The Limit", a track released on Westbam's album Famous Last Songs Vol. 1 (2021).

== Awards and nominations ==
Year	Awards	Work	Category	Result
1991	Brit Awards	"Hello"	Best British Video	Nominated
1993	MTV VMA	"Sweet Harmony"	Viewer's Choice (Europe)	Nominated

== Members ==
=== Current members ===
- Jon Marsh – lead vocals, keyboards, programming, drums (1983–present)

=== Former members ===
- Steve Waddington – guitars, piano, keyboards, occasional vocals (1983–1991)
- Tim Havard – bass (1983–1987)
- Guy Gausden – drums, percussion (1984–1987)
- Helena Marsh – keyboards, programming (1992–1997)

== Discography ==
=== Albums ===
Year	Album	Chart positions							Label	Certifications
Year	Album	UK	UK Indie	US	AUS	AUT	GER	SWE	Label	Certifications
1988	Where It Is	—	17	—	—	—	—	—	Flim Flam Productions	
1990	Happiness	14	—	154	104	—	—	—	East West	BPI: Gold
1990	Blissed Out	38	—	—	111	—	—	—	East West	
1993	Conscience	2	—	—	144	22	47	—	East West	BPI: Gold
1996	X	25	—	—	88	—	—	53	East West	
1997	Single File (compilation)	171	—	—	—	—	—	—	East West	
" " denotes releases that did not chart.

=== Singles ===
Year	Single	Peak positions										Certifications	Album
Year	Single	UK	UK Indie	AUS	AUT	FRA	GER	IRE	NED	SWE	SWI	Certifications	Album
1986	"A Hundred Words"	—	15	—	—	—	—	—	—	—	—		Where It Is
1986	"This Means War"	—	22	—	—	—	—	—	—	—	—		Where It Is
1987	"Happy Now"	—	—	—	—	—	—	—	—	—	—		Non-album single
1987	"Surprise Me" / "Forever Dancing"	—	15	—	—	—	—	—	—	—	—		Where It Is
1988	"Loving Feeling"	—	—	—	—	—	—	—	—	—	—		Non-album single
1989	"Your Love Takes Me Higher"	91	—	—	—	—	—	—	—	—	—		Happiness
1989	"The Sun Rising"	26	—	—	—	—	—	28	—	—	—		Happiness
1990	"Hello"	19	—	94	—	—	—	—	—	—	—		Happiness
1990	"Your Love Takes Me Higher" (reissue)	39	—	148	—	—	—	—	—	—	—		Happiness
1990	"Time After Time"	46	—	—	—	—	—	—	—	—	—		Happiness
1990	"It's Alright Now"	48	—	150	—	—	—	—	—	—	—		Blissed Out
1993	"Sweet Harmony"	8	—	147	3	16	6	14	21	14	6	BPI: Silver	Conscience
1993	"Celebrate Your Life" / "You've Got Me Thinking"	23	—	200	—	—	—	21	—	—	—		Conscience
1993	"Outerspace Girl"	38	—	—	—	—	76	—	—	—	—		Conscience
1993	"Rock to the Rhythm of Love" (US only)	—	—	—	—	—	—	—	—	—	—		Conscience
1995	"1000 Years from Today" (promo)	—	—	—	—	—	—	—	—	—	—		Non-album single
1996	"Satellite"	19	—	116	—	—	—	—	—	—	—		X
1996	"Deliver Me"	—	—	198	—	—	—	—	—	—	—		X
1996	"Ease the Pressure"	43	—	—	—	—	—	—	—	—	—		X
1996	"Crystal Wave" (white label)	—	—	—	—	—	—	—	—	—	—		Non-album singles
1996	"Physical Love" / "Three Steps to Heaven"	—	—	—	—	—	—	—	—	—	—		Non-album singles
1997	"The Sun Rising" (reissue)	31	—	—	—	—	—	—	—	—	—		Single File
2000	"With You"	—	—	—	—	—	—	—	—	—	—		Non-album singles
2000	"Timeslip" (white label)	—	—	—	—	—	—	—	—	—	—		Non-album singles
2019	"Motivation" (digital)	—	—	—	—	—	—	—	—	—	—		Non-album singles
2019	"Your Love Takes Me Higher (Evil Mix)" / "Awoke"	—	—	—	—	—	—	—	—	—	—		Non-album singles
2019	"Physical Love (Derrick Carter & Chris Nazuka 'Red Nail' Remixes)" (digital)	—	—	—	—	—	—	—	—	—	—		Non-album singles
2019	"For Your Love (Age of Insanity Remixes)" (digital)	—	—	—	—	—	—	—	—	—	—		Non-album singles
2019	"Three Steps To Heaven (Deep Dish Remixes)" (digital)	—	—	—	—	—	—	—	—	—	—		Non-album singles
"—" denotes releases that did not chart or were not released.

=== Music videos ===
- "This Means War" (1986)
- "Forever Dancing" (1987)
- "Loving Feeling" (1988)
- "Your Love Takes Me Higher" (1989)
- "The Sun Rising" (1989)
- "Hello" (1990)
- "Your Love Takes Me Higher" (second version) (1990)
- "Time After Time" (1990)
- "It's Alright Now" (1990)
- "Sweet Harmony" (1993)
- "You've Got Me Thinking" (1993)
- "Outerspace Girl" (1993)
- "Satellite" (1996)
- "Deliver Me" (1996)
- "The Sun Rising (Tom's Drum & Bass Mix)" (1997)
