= 1990–91 Stoke City F.C. season =

Stoke City
1990–91 season
- Chairman: Peter Coates
- Manager: Alan Ball, Graham Paddon
- Stadium: Victoria Ground
- Football League Third Division: 14th (60 Points)
- FA Cup: Second round
- League Cup: Second round
- League Trophy: Second round
- Top goalscorer: League: Wayne Biggins (12 goals); All: Wayne Biggins (12 goals)
- Highest home attendance: 16,009 vs Birmingham City (8 September 1990)
- Lowest home attendance: 6,946 vs Bradford City (27 April 1991)
- Average home league attendance: 11,565
Home colours

The 1990–91 season was Stoke City's 84th season in the Football League and 2nd in the Third Division.

Stoke City entered the 1990–91 season in the Third Division for only the second time in their history and the feeling from the supporters was that a club of Stoke's size should be able to easily gain an instant return to the second tier. However Stoke experienced their worst ever season in terms of league position as they could only muster a 14th-place finish. Alan Ball was sacked in February and his assistant Graham Paddon took over for the remainder of the season.

== Season review ==
=== League ===
The 1990–91 season will long be remembered by Stoke supporters as the club finished in its lowest ever league position of 14th in the third tier. Manager Alan Ball was dismissed in late February after a 4–0 defeat at Wigan Athletic with Graham Paddon filling the gap until the end of the season. The overall team performances were of a low standard with some embarrassing defeats being suffered against the likes of Shrewsbury Town, Leyton Orient, Cambridge United and Bournemouth.

It was all meant to be so different when the season started with Stoke beating Rotherham United 3–1 on the opening day which was followed by a commanding away victory at Tranmere Rovers. The club were in the top three until the start of December, but as the first half of the season came to an end Stoke's form began to suffer and after exiting the FA Cup Stoke had two awful performances against Exeter City and Preston North End and their form completely dropped off. Results briefly improved after Paddon took over, and following a victory over Mansfield Town in late March, the club were in 9th place, just three points outside the play-offs. After that win however, Stoke earned just 4 points from their last 9 matches, ending both any remaining promotion hopes and Paddon's chance of becoming permanent manager; he resigned after the season ended and returned to former club Portsmouth as a coach. Stoke had an abysmal disciplinary record this season and at times the attitude of the players on the pitch left lot to be desired. And so, despite boasting the largest supporter base and wage budget, Stoke had a season to forget in the Third Division.

=== FA Cup ===
Stoke overcame non-league Telford United in a replay but were knocked out 2–0 at Burnley in the second round.

=== League Cup ===
A dull two legs against Swansea City was finally ended with minutes remaining thanks to a goal from Tony Kelly. However Stoke were well beaten by West Ham United 5–1 on aggregate in the next round.

=== League Trophy ===
Stoke's first Football League Trophy campaign saw them fail to get out of a group containing Mansfield Town and Northampton Town.

== Final league table ==
Pos	Team	Pld	W	D	L	GF	GA	GD	Pts
12	Birmingham City	46	16	17	13	45	49	−4	65
13	Leyton Orient	46	18	10	18	55	58	−3	64
14	Stoke City	46	16	12	18	55	59	−4	60
15	Reading	46	17	8	21	53	66	−13	59
16	Exeter City	46	16	9	21	58	52	+6	57

== Results ==
=== Legend ===
Win	Draw	Loss

=== Football League Third Division ===
Match	Date	Opponent	Venue	Result	Attendance	Scorers
1	25 August 1990	Rotherham United	H	3–1	12,748	Blake 15', Kennedy 44' (pen), Thomas 49'
2	31 August 1990	Tranmere Rovers	A	2–1	10,327	Ellis 36', Kennedy 43' (pen)
3	8 September 1990	Birmingham City	H	0–1	16,009	
4	15 September 1990	Bournemouth	A	1–1	6,374	Statham 84'
5	18 September 1990	Chester City	A	1–1	3,759	Thomas 7'
6	22 September 1990	Southend United	H	4–0	11,901	Ware 38', Biggins (2) 41', 49', Cornwell 68' (o.g.)
7	29 September 1990	Shrewsbury Town	H	1–3	12,672	Sandford 26'
8	2 October 1990	Crewe Alexandra	A	2–1	7,200	Biggins 42', Ware 77'
9	6 October 1990	Bolton Wanderers	A	1–0	8,521	Evans 61'
10	13 October 1990	Fulham	H	2–1	12,394	Ellis (2) 26', 68'
11	20 October 1990	Cambridge United	H	1–1	12,673	Biggins 54'
12	24 October 1990	Bradford City	A	2–1	8,068	Kelly 58', Thomas 88'
13	27 October 1990	Grimsby Town	A	0–2	10,799	
14	3 November 1990	Reading	H	0–1	12,245	
15	10 November 1990	Wigan Athletic	H	2–0	12,756	Biggins 20', Kennedy 68'
16	24 November 1990	Bury	A	1–1	5,118	Thomas 47'
17	1 December 1990	Exeter City	A	0–2	5,377	
18	16 December 1990	Brentford	H	2–2	10,995	Hilaire 10', Sandford 65'
19	22 December 1990	Preston North End	A	0–2	7,532	
20	26 December 1990	Swansea City	H	2–2	12,534	Biggins 44', Thomas 70'
21	29 December 1990	Huddersfield Town	H	2–0	11,869	Ellis (2) 15', 48'
22	1 January 1991	Leyton Orient	A	2–0	6,371	Ellis 9', Thomas 59'
23	12 January 1991	Tranmere Rovers	H	1–1	13,461	Butler 77'
24	19 January 1991	Rotherham United	A	0–0	6,236	
25	2 February 1991	Chester City	H	2–3	11,037	Kelly 60', Hilaire 68'
26	5 February 1991	Southend United	A	0–1	5,164	
27	16 February 1991	Bury	H	2–2	9,885	Biggins (2) 45', 65'
28	23 February 1991	Wigan Athletic	A	0–4	3,728	
29	27 February 1991	Bournemouth	H	1–3	7,797	Biggins 50'
30	2 March 1991	Exeter City	H	2–1	8,536	Biggins (2) 27', 85'
31	5 March 1991	Mansfield Town	A	0–0	2,941	
32	9 March 1991	Brentford	A	4–0	7,249	Thomas 64', Blake 69', Beeston 86', Clarke 90'
33	13 March 1991	Crewe Alexandra	H	1–0	15,455	Devlin 90'
34	16 March 1991	Shrewsbury Town	A	0–2	6,210	
35	19 March 1991	Fulham	A	1–0	3,131	Biggins 61'
36	23 March 1991	Bolton Wanderers	H	2–2	13,869	Devlin 47', Kelly 55'
37	26 March 1991	Mansfield Town	H	3–1	9,113	Clarke (2) 30', 60', Blake 53'
38	30 March 1991	Swansea City	A	1–2	4,418	Ellis 88'
39	1 April 1991	Preston North End	H	0–1	11,524	
40	6 April 1991	Huddersfield Town	A	0–3	6,520	
41	13 April 1991	Leyton Orient	H	1–2	7,957	Beeston 27'
42	16 April 1991	Birmingham City	A	1–2	6,726	Ellis 45'
43	20 April 1991	Cambridge United	A	0–3	5,726	
44	27 April 1991	Bradford City	H	2–1	6,943	Ellis 17', Butler 45'
45	4 May 1991	Grimsby Town	H	0–0	11,832	
46	11 May 1991	Reading	A	0–1	4,101	

=== FA Cup ===
Round	Date	Opponent	Venue	Result	Attendance	Scorers
R1	17 November 1990	Telford United	A	0–0	3,709	
R1 Replay	21 November 1990	Telford United	H	1–0	11,880	Sandford 14'
R2	12 December 1990	Burnley	A	0–2	12,949	

=== League Cup ===
Round	Date	Opponent	Venue	Result	Attendance	Scorers
R1 1st Leg	29 August 1990	Swansea City	H	0–0	7,806	
R1 2nd Leg	4 September 1990	Swansea City	A	1–0	4,464	Kelly 86'
R2 1st Leg	26 September 1990	West Ham United	A	0–3	15,870	
R2 2nd Leg	10 October 1990	West Ham United	H	1–2	8,411	Evans 37'

=== League Trophy ===
Round	Date	Opponent	Venue	Result	Attendance	Scorers
PR1	16 November 1990	Northampton Town	H	1–1	4,339	Barnes 60'
PR2	8 January 1991	Mansfield Town	A	0–3	1,600	

=== Friendlies ===
Match	Opponent	Venue	Result
1	Port Vale	H	1–0
2	Burton Albion	A	5–1
3	Fleetwood Town	A	2–0
4	Congleton Town	A	2–1
5	Worcester City	A	4–0
6	Rocester	A	2–0
7	Newcastle Town	A	2–1
8	West Bromwich Albion	H	1–1

== Squad statistics ==
Pos.	Name	League		FA Cup		League Cup		League Trophy		Total	
Pos.	Name	Apps	Goals	Apps	Goals	Apps	Goals	Apps	Goals	Apps	Goals
GK	(England) Peter Fox	44	0	3	0	4	0	2	0	53	0
GK	(England) Dan Noble	2	0	0	0	0	0	0	0	2	0
DF	(Jamaica) Noel Blake	44	3	3	0	4	0	1	0	52	3
DF	(England) John Butler	31	2	1	0	4	0	1	0	37	2
DF	(England) Cliff Carr	15(5)	0	0	0	1	0	1	0	17(5)	0
DF	(England) Ian Cranson	7(2)	0	3	0	0	0	1	0	11(2)	0
DF	(England) Lee Fowler	14(3)	0	0(2)	0	1(1)	0	1	0	16(6)	0
DF	(England) Tony Gallimore	4(3)	0	0	0	0	0	0	0	4(3)	0
DF	(England) Paul Rennie	3	0	1	0	0	0	0	0	4	0
DF	(England) Derek Statham	22	1	3	0	3	0	0	0	28	1
DF	(England) Lee Sandford	32	2	3	1	3	0	2	0	40	3
DF	(England) Ian Wright	1	0	0	0	0	0	0	0	1	0
MF	(England) Carl Beeston	37	2	2(1)	0	3	0	1	0	43(1)	2
MF	(Scotland) Mark Devlin	18(3)	2	0	0	0	0	0	0	18(3)	2
MF	(Republic of Ireland) Mick Kennedy	32	3	3	0	3	0	1	0	39	3
MF	(Scotland) Dave Kevan	4(1)	0	0	0	1	0	1(1)	0	6(2)	0
MF	(England) Chris Male	0	0	0	0	0	0	0(1)	0	0(1)	0
MF	(Scotland) Brian Rice	18	0	0	0	0	0	0	0	18	0
MF	(England) Ian Scott	1(1)	0	0	0	1	0	1	0	3(1)	0
MF	(Wales) Mickey Thomas	32(6)	7	3	0	2(1)	0	1	0	38(7)	7
MF	(England) Paul Ware	29(5)	2	1	0	3	0	2	0	35(5)	2
FW	(England) Paul Baines	1(1)	0	0	0	0	0	0	0	1(1)	0
FW	(England) Paul Barnes	3(3)	0	0	0	0	0	1	1	4(3)	1
FW	(England) Wayne Biggins	36(2)	12	3	0	4	0	1	0	44(2)	12
FW	(England) Darren Boughey	0	0	0	0	0(2)	0	1	0	1(2)	0
FW	(England) David Bright	0(1)	0	0	0	0	0	0	0	0(1)	0
FW	(England) Wayne Clarke	9	3	0	0	0	0	0	0	9	3
FW	(England) Tony Ellis	33(5)	9	1(2)	0	3	0	2	0	39(7)	9
FW	(England) Gareth Evans	5	1	0	0	2	1	0	0	7	2
FW	(England) Vince Hilaire	10	2	1	0	0	0	1	0	12	2
FW	(England) Tony Kelly	16(13)	3	0	0	2(1)	1	0(1)	0	18(15)	4
FW	(England) Billy Whitehurst	3	0	2	0	0	0	0	0	5	0
–	Own goals	–	1	–	0	–	0	–	0	–	1
