= Where It Is =

1987 compilation album by The Beloved

Compilation album by The Beloved
- Released: 23 November 1987
- Recorded: January 1986 – June 1987 (LP) October 1983 – January 1988 (Remastered 2CD)
- Genre: Indie, post-punk
- Label: Flim Flam Productions
- Producer: Michael Johnson, the Beloved

The Beloved chronology
Where It Is (1987)	Happiness (1990)

Singles from Where It Is
- 1. "A Hundred Words" Released: April 1986; 2. "This Means War" Released: September 1986; 3. "Surprise Me / Forever Dancing" Released: 13 June 1987

Professional ratings
Review scores
Source	Rating
AllMusic	1.5/5 stars

Where It Is is the debut album by British band the Beloved, first released as a vinyl LP in November 1987 on the Flim Flam Productions label. It was the only album the band released as an indie guitar band before the line-up halved, and transitioning to dance/pop. It is mostly considered to be a compilation album (including by the band themselves), since it compiles most of the singles and related B-side tracks the band released between April 1986 and June 1987, along with tracks from the Happy Now EP (albeit with one, "Righteous Me", being a re-recording). The album was produced by New Order's engineer Michael Johnson, except for "Forever Dancing" and "If Only '87", which were produced by the band themselves. All of the singles made the top 30 on the UK Indie Chart, but failed to reach the UK top 75. It did not chart on the UK Albums Chart, but it reached number 17 on the UK Indie Chart.

For the initial LP release, a limited number of the albums included a free 7-inch EP included with purchase (containing three demos: "Forever Laughing", "Falling on My Face" and "The Last Detail"). The album was then reissued on CD in early 1988 as an expanded edition with a more chronological track order and four bonus tracks: an extended remix of the track "Forever Dancing", the original 1986 version of "If Only", "A Kiss Goodbye" from the Happy Now EP and "If Only '88" (a re-recording of "If Only" specifically for the CD version).

The album was remastered and re-released on 31 January 2020 as a 2-CD set by New State Music. This edition features other B-side tracks not included on the original versions and a second disc of demos and alternate versions of tracks. This release charted at number 88 on the UK Albums Chart.

== Track listings ==
All tracks credited to all four band members except where noted.

=== Original LP release (1987) ===
No.	Title	Writer(s)	Length
1.	"If Pennies Came from Heaven Could Karl Marx Have Been Mistaken?"	Tim Havard	4:20
2.	"A Hundred Words"		3:43
3.	"Surprise Me"	Jon Marsh	3:22
4.	"Let It Begin"		3:53
5.	"Forever Dancing"	Marsh	4:07
6.	"Righteous Me"	Marsh	3:39
7.	"Slow Drowning"		4:29
8.	"This Means War"		3:29
9.	"If Only '87"		3:45
10.	"In Trouble and Shame"		7:05

=== CD re-release (1988) ===
No.	Title	Writer(s)	Length
1.	"A Hundred Words"		3:43
2.	"Slow Drowning"		4:29
3.	"In Trouble and Shame"		7:05
4.	"This Means War"		3:29
5.	"Let It Begin"		3:53
6.	"If Only"		4:11
7.	"Surprise Me"	Marsh	3:22
8.	"Righteous Me"	Marsh	3:39
9.	"A Kiss Goodbye"	Steve Waddington, Havard	2:59
10.	"If Pennies Came from Heaven Could Karl Marx Have Been Mistaken?"	Havard	4:20
11.	"Forever Dancing"	Marsh	8:40
12.	"If Only '88"		4:01

=== 2CD Special Edition remaster (2020) ===
Disc 1
No.	Title	Writer(s)	Length
1.	"A Hundred Words"
2.	"Slow Drowning"
3.	"In Trouble and Shame"
4.	"This Means War"
5.	"If Only"
6.	"Let It Begin"
7.	"Saints Preserve Us"
8.	"Righteous Me"	Marsh
9.	"A Kiss Goodbye"	Waddington, Havard
10.	"If Pennies Came from Heaven Could Karl Marx Have Been Mistaken?"	Havard
11.	"Forever Dancing"	Marsh
12.	"Surprise Me"	Marsh
13.	"Having Fun"	Marsh
14.	"Forever Dancing (Stephen Street remix)"	Marsh
15.	"If Only '88"

Disc 2 - Demos and Rarities
No.	Title	Writer(s)	Length
1.	"The Flame '83 (demo)"	Marsh, Havard	7:44
2.	"The Last Detail '84 (demo)"	Marsh, Waddington	3:35
3.	"Grin (demo)"	Marsh	5:30
4.	"Disgrace (demo)"	Marsh	3:03
5.	"Privacy (Sometimes) (demo)"	Marsh	4:38
6.	"The Flame '84 (demo)"	Marsh, Havard	5:12
7.	"Seppuku Glory (demo)"	Marsh, Waddington	4:48
8.	"Falling on My Face (demo)"	Marsh	4:23
9.	"Each & Every Time (demo)"	Marsh	4:33
10.	"The Last Detail '85 (demo)"	Marsh, Waddington	4:10
11.	"Righteous Me (original version)"	Marsh	3:38
12.	"Forever Laughing (demo)"	Marsh	4:37
13.	"If You Ever Change Your Mind (demo)"	Marsh	3:43
14.	"On the Fence (demo)"	Marsh	3:42
15.	"Forever Dancing (7-inch version)"	Marsh	3:43
16.	"If Only '87"		3:45

== Personnel ==
=== Band ===
- Jon Marsh - vocals, keyboards, drums on CD2 tracks 1–6
- Steve Waddington - guitar, piano on "In Trouble and Shame"
- Tim Havard - bass
- Guy Gausden - drums

=== Production ===
- Michael Johnson - production except "Forever Dancing" and "If Only"
- The Beloved - production on "Forever Dancing", "If Only", "Having Fun", "The Last Detail", "Grin", "Disgrace", "Privacy (Sometimes)", "The Flame '84", "Seppuku Glory", "Falling on My Face", "Each & Every Time", "Forever Laughing", "If You Ever Change Your Mind" and "On the Fence"
- The Journey Through - production on "The Flame '83"

=== Staff ===
- Five Point - sleeve
- Phil Nicholls - photography (taken in Paris, France, June 1987)
