= Ian Scott (footballer, born 1967) =

English footballer

Personal information
- Full name: Ian Scott
- Date of birth: 20 September 1967 (age 59)
- Place of birth: Manchester, England
- Position: Midfielder

Youth career
- Manchester City

Senior career*
Years	Team	Apps	(Gls)
1987–1989	Manchester City	24	(3)
1989–1992	Stoke City	30	(2)
1990–1991	→ Crewe Alexandra (loan)	12	(1)
1992–1993	Bury	9	(2)
1992	→ Mossley (loam)		
Total		75	(8)
- * Club domestic league appearances and goals

Ian Scott (born 20 September 1967) is a former footballer who played in the Football League for Bury, Crewe Alexandra, Manchester City and Stoke City.

== Career ==
Born in Manchester, Scott started his career with his local club Manchester City after progressing through the youth ranks at Maine Road. He spent two years in the Manchester City first team before joining Stoke City in 1989. His first season with Stoke was a poor one as the club were relegated to the Third Division. He spent the 1990–91 season in the club's reserves and also went out on loan to Crewe Alexandra. And after failing to establish himself in the squad in the 1991–92 season, Scott left Stoke in 1992 and joined Bury. He spent the 1992–93 season at Gigg Lane making twelve appearances scoring twice.

He also made two appearances for Mossley in 1992 on loan from Bury.

== Career statistics ==
Appearances and goals by club, season and competition
Club	Season	League			FA Cup		League Cup		Other^{[A]}		Total	
Club	Season	Division	Apps	Goals	Apps	Goals	Apps	Goals	Apps	Goals	Apps	Goals
Manchester City	1987–88	Second Division	22	3	3	1	3	0	2	0	30	4
Manchester City	1988–89	Second Division	2	0	1	0	1	0	0	0	4	0
Manchester City	Total		24	3	4	1	4	0	2	0	34	4
Stoke City	1989–90	Second Division	19	1	0	0	0	0	1	0	20	1
Stoke City	1990–91	Third Division	2	0	0	0	1	0	1	0	4	0
Stoke City	1991–92	Third Division	9	1	1	0	3	0	1	0	14	1
Stoke City	Total		30	2	1	0	4	0	3	0	39	2
Crewe Alexandra (loan)	1990–91	Third Division	12	1	0	0	0	0	0	0	12	1
Bury	1992–93	Fourth Division	9	2	0	0	3	0	0	0	12	2
Career total			75	8	5	1	11	0	5	0	96	9

A. The "Other" column constitutes appearances and goals in the Football League Trophy and Full Members Cup.
