= Chris Male =

English footballer

Personal information
- Full name: Christopher Male
- Date of birth: 16 June 1972 (age 54)
- Place of birth: Portsmouth, England
- Position: Midfielder

Youth career
- 1988–1990: Portsmouth

Senior career*
Years	Team	Apps	(Gls)
1990–1991	Stoke City	0	(0)
- Waterlooville
- * Club domestic league appearances and goals

Christopher Male (born 16 June 1972) is an English former footballer who played for Stoke City.

== Career ==
Male joined Stoke City as a teenager from Portsmouth but his only appearance for the club came in a 1–1 draw at home to Northampton Town in the Football League Trophy during the 1990–91 season, where he came on as a substitute for Dave Kevan. He moved back to his home town of Portsmouth at the end of the season and played for Waterlooville.

== Career statistics ==
Appearances and goals by club, season and competition
Club	Season	League			FA Cup		League Cup		Other		Total	
Club	Season	Division	Apps	Goals	Apps	Goals	Apps	Goals	Apps	Goals	Apps	Goals
Stoke City	1990–91	Third Division	0	0	0	0	0	0	1 (Note: Appearances in Football League Trophy)	0	1	0
Career total			0	0	0	0	0	0	1	0	1	0
