= Mark Higgins (footballer) =

English footballer (born 1958)

Personal information
- Full name: Mark Nicholas Higgins
- Date of birth: 29 September 1958 (age 68)
- Place of birth: Buxton, Derbyshire, England
- Height: 6 ft 1 in (1.85 m)
- Position: Centre-back

Youth career
- 1975–1976: Everton

Senior career*
Years	Team	Apps	(Gls)
1976–1985	Everton	152	(6)
1985–1987	Manchester United	6	(0)
1987	→ Bury (loan)	0	(0)
1987–1988	Bury	68	(0)
1988–1990	Stoke City	39	(1)
Total		265	(7)

International career
1973–1974	England Schoolboys	15	(2)
1977	England Youth	2	(0)
- * Club domestic league appearances and goals

Mark Nicholas Higgins (born 29 September 1958) is an English former footballer who played at centre back for Everton, Manchester United, Bury and Stoke City.

== Career ==
Born in Buxton, Derbyshire, Higgins is the son of former Bolton Wanderers's centre-back John Higgins. Higgins represented England schoolboys prior to signing for Everton.

Higgins joined Everton as an apprentice and earned his first team debut for the Toffees on 5 October 1976. He made a total of 183 appearances for the club, scoring 6 goals. Higgins later picked up a severe injury, which forced him to temporarily retire from the game in May 1984.

Defying all expectations, Higgins returned to the game 18 months later, when he joined Manchester United for £60,000 in December 1985. He made his Manchester United debut in a 2–0 home win over Rochdale in the FA Cup Third Round on 9 January 1986. However, he was unable to recover the form he had shown while with Everton and, after just eight appearances for United (six league, two cup), he was allowed to go on loan to Bury in January 1987 before the transfer was made permanent in February 1987 for a fee of £10,000.

At Gigg Lane Higgins played 82 times for the club in three seasons before joining Stoke City in September 1988. He played 37 times for Stoke in 1988–89 scoring once against Chelsea. In 1989–90 he played nine times for Stoke before being released at the end of the season. He then joined Burnley on trial but injured his back and decided to retire from playing. He now does stadium tours for Everton.

== Career statistics ==
Appearances and goals by club, season and competition
Club	Season	League			FA Cup		League Cup		Other^{[A]}		Total	
Club	Season	Division	Apps	Goals	Apps	Goals	Apps	Goals	Apps	Goals	Apps	Goals
Everton	1976–77	First Division	2	0	0	0	0	0	0	0	2	0
Everton	1977–78	First Division	26	1	1	0	5	0	0	0	32	1
Everton	1978–79	First Division	20	1	0	0	0	0	2	0	22	1
Everton	1979–80	First Division	19	0	0	0	5	0	2	0	26	0
Everton	1980–81	First Division	2	0	0	0	0	0	0	0	2	0
Everton	1981–82	First Division	29	3	1	0	2	0	0	0	32	3
Everton	1982–83	First Division	39	1	5	0	2	0	0	0	47	1
Everton	1983–84	First Division	14	0	0	0	5	0	0	0	19	0
Everton	1984–85	First Division	0	0	0	0	0	0	0	0	0	0
Everton	Total		152	6	7	0	19	0	4	0	182	6
Manchester United	1985–86	First Division	6	0	2	0	0	0	0	0	8	0
Manchester United	Total		6	0	2	0	0	0	0	0	8	0
Bury	1986–87	Third Division	22	0	0	0	0	0	2	0	24	0
Bury	1987–88	Third Division	41	0	1	0	5	0	3	0	50	0
Bury	1988–89	Third Division	5	0	0	0	3	0	0	0	8	0
Bury	Total		68	0	1	0	8	0	5	0	82	0
Stoke City	1988–89	Second Division	33	1	3	0	0	0	1	0	37	1
Stoke City	1989–90	Second Division	6	0	0	0	2	0	1	0	9	0
Stoke City	Total		39	1	3	0	2	0	2	0	46	1
Career total			265	7	13	0	29	0	11	0	318	7

A. The "Other" column constitutes appearances and goals in the Football League Trophy, Full Members' Cup and UEFA Cup.
