= Conscience (The Beloved album) =

Studio album by The Beloved
- Released: 8 February 1993 (album); 1992 (EP)
- Recorded: March–July 1992
- Studio: Sarm West Studios + Wolf Studio and Abbey Road
- Genre: Electronic dance music; pop rock
- Length: 57:06
- Label: East West (album); Atlantic (EP and U.S. album)
- Producer: Jon Marsh and Helena Marsh

The Beloved chronology
Blissed Out (1990)	Conscience (1993)	X (1996)

Singles from Conscience
- 1. "Sweet Harmony" Released: 11 January 1993; 2. "Celebrate Your Life / You've Got Me Thinking" Released: 2 March 1993; 3. "Outerspace Girl" Released: 14 August 1993; 4. "Rock to the Rhythm of Love" Released: 1993 (US Only)

Professional ratings
Review scores
Source	Rating
AllMusic	3/5 stars
Entertainment Weekly	B+
Music Week	3/5 stars
Select	4/5 medals
St. Petersburg Times	(favorable)

Conscience is the second studio album, and fourth album overall, by English electronic music group The Beloved, released in February 1993. It reached #2 on the UK Albums Chart and includes "Sweet Harmony", the first single taken from the album and the first from the band to enter the Top 10 of the UK Singles Chart, peaking at number eight. Both are the highest positions reached by The Beloved in the UK charts with an album and single release.

== Album information ==
The band faced some controversy for the video of the album's first single, "Sweet Harmony," which consists of singer Jon Marsh naked among a group of women who were also naked (although it was shot and edited so as not to show anything which might cause it to be censored). One of the nude stars of the video is English model Tess Daly, who went on to become a television presenter. Still a duo, Jon had recruited his wife Helena after fellow band member Steve Waddington left, following the release of the 1991 remix album Blissed Out. Jon and Helena composed all of the songs on Conscience, but Helena rarely appeared at live promotional gigs, though she did feature on some videos for the album's singles, but not on "Sweet Harmony." This song, which was originally used to promote the second season of the popular American primetime soap opera Melrose Place in some European countries, including Italy, has since been used in Homebase advertising too.

The album produced other singles, but none of them were as successful as "Sweet Harmony" which went on to become their biggest hit in the UK, reaching number 8 in January 1993. The other four singles taken from the album were a double A-side of "Celebrate Your Life" and "You've Got Me Thinking", which peaked at number 23, "Outerspace Girl", which reached number 38 and the final single, "Rock to the Rhythm of Love," which was released in the United States only. The latter song was performed live at the London Gay Pride in 1994 during the afternoon hours of a concert which was then closed by Boy George late at night. Many musicians who participated in George's Jesus Loves You project are also featured on Conscience, such as keyboardist Richard Cottle and, most notably, guitarist John Themis, who authored much of George's solo works after the Jesus Loves You project.

== Critical reception ==
Marisa Fox from Entertainment Weekly wrote, "The Beloved's front man, Jon Marsh, comes off as a New-agey Bryan Ferry, purring cosmic, romantic sentiments (like 'Lose yourself in me') all over his second U.S. album, Conscience. Whereas Ferry infused rock with sensuality, Marsh and his wife-partner, Helena, lace their ethereal mix with house grooves that seduce and hypnotize."

== Track listing ==
All songs by Jon Marsh and Helena Marsh.

1. "Spirit" – 4:44
2. "Sweet Harmony" – 5:00
3. "Outerspace Girl" – 4:46
4. "Lose Yourself in Me" – 4:32
5. "Paradise Found" – 7:16
6. "You've Got Me Thinking" – 4:07
7. "Celebrate Your Life" – 5:31
8. "Rock to the Rhythm of Love" – 4:30
9. "Let the Music Take You" – 5:01
10. "1000 Years from Today" – 5:17
11. "Dream On" – 6:22

=== EP "Sweet Harmony" ===
1. "Sweet Harmony" («Conscience» Radio Edit)
2. "Sweet Harmony" («Live the Dream» Mix)
3. "Sweet Harmony" («Come Together and Consolidate» Radio Edit) *
4. "Sweet Harmony" («Come Together and Consolidate» Extended Mix) *
5. "Sweet Harmony" («Sweet Sensation» Mix) +
6. "Sweet Harmony" («Tout de Suite» Dub Mix) +
7. "Dream On" (LP version)
- #23)
- #38)

== Personnel ==
=== The Beloved ===
- Jon Marsh – keyboards, vocals, programming, music, lyrics, production; production and mixing on EP
- Helena Marsh – music, lyrics, production; production and mixing on EP

=== Musicians ===
- Miles Bould – percussion on #1, 5, 6, 9, 11
- Dave Clayton – piano on #6, 10, fx keyboards on #2, 8, additional keyboards on #10
- Richard Cottle – Hammond Organ on # 1, 5, fx keyboards on #2, additional keyboards on #9
- Nigel Hitchcock – saxophone on #2
- Ed Shearmur – string arrangements on #1, 6, additional keyboards on #6
- Tony Smith – guitar on #7
- Neil Taylor – guitar on #1, 4, 9, 10, 11
- John Themis – acoustic guitar on #6, lute on #2, additional guitar on #1, 9
- Paul Waller – drum programming on #5, 6, additional drum programming on #1, 3, 4, 7, 9, 11
- Gavyn Wright – orchestra leader on #1, 6
- Derek Green, Beverley Skeete – background vocals on #1, 2, 5, 6, 7, 10
- Linda Lewis, Paul Lewis, Shirley Lewis – background vocals on #3, 8, 9, 11
- Sylvia Mason-James – ad-lib vocals on #7, background vocals on #1, 2, 5, 6, 7, 10

=== Recording and production ===
- Ren Swan – recording and mixing engineer; engineer on +
- Paul Wright – recording engineer
- Matt Ellard – assistant engineer
- Steve Fitzmaurice, Dominique Brethes, Steve McLaughlin – additional recording
- Sarm West Studios – main recording studios (March–July 1992
- Wolf Studio, Abbey Road – additional recording studios
- Mark Pistel, Philip Steir for Mindless Productions – post-production on *
- Craig Silvey – engineer on *
- PRIO – digital engineer on *
- Adam & Eve, Peace Bisquit – additional production on +

=== Other staff ===
- Bob Linney – artwork
- Me Company – layout
- Chris Morrison / CMO – management (UK)
- Bill Coleman / Peace Bisquit – management (U.S.)
- EMI/Virgin Music Ltd/Warner Music Ltd – publishers
- East West, Atlantic, EMI/Virgin Music, CMO, Sarm West, Sharon Addison, Bill Coleman, Andy Delaney, Matt Ellard, Marc Fox, Bob Linney, Chris Morrison, Martyn Phillips, Ren Swan, Lola Weidner, Monty Whitebloom, Paul Wright – special thanks

== Charts and certifications ==
=== Weekly charts ===
Chart (1993)	Peak position
Australian Albums Chart	144
Austrian Albums Chart	22
German Albums Chart	47
UK Albums Chart	2

=== Certifications ===
Region	Certification	Certified units/sales
United Kingdom (BPI)	Gold	100,000^{^}
^{^} Shipments figures based on certification alone.

== Release details ==
=== Album ===
Country	Date	Label	Format	Catalog
Germany	1993	East West	CD	4509-91483-2
France				CA 851
U.S.		Atlantic	CD/MC	82457

=== EP ===
Country	Date	Label	Format	Catalog
U.S.	1992	Atlantic	EP	85759-2
