= It's Alright Now =

Single by The Beloved

from the album Blissed Out
- B-side: "Scarlet Beautiful (Naked & Foxy)"
- Released: 22 October 1990
- Recorded: 1990
- Genre: Dance-pop; house
- Length: 4:15
- Label: EastWest
- Songwriter(s): Jon Marsh
- Producer(s): Jon Marsh

The Beloved singles chronology
"Time After Time" (1990)	"It's Alright Now" (1990)	"Sweet Harmony" (1993)

Music video
- "It's Alright Now" on YouTube

"It's Alright Now" is a song by British band The Beloved, released in October 1990 by EastWest as a single from their remix album, Blissed Out (1990). It is both written and produced by the group's frontman Jon Marsh, and became a top-50 hit in the UK, peaking at number 48 on the UK Singles Chart.

== Critical reception ==
Pan-European magazine Music & Media commented, "Soft-spoken vocals and basic beats and basslines produce a song that is very close to New Order-type of moody dance pop." Nick Robinson from Music Week wrote that this track finds the duo "retouching a track that doesn't sound that dissimilar to their previous singles and recent works by fellow Mancunians Cabaret Voltaire. Undemanding, mellow house grooves that sort of drift in and out with a degree of style. A hit but not a big one."

== Music video ==
The accompanying music video for "It's Alright Now" features Jon Marsh and Steve Waddington travelling on the London Underground, intercut with footage of Jon Marsh riding in a hot-air balloon. The song was also promoted live on the UK music program Dance Energy, which included a then-unknown Geri Halliwell dancing amongst the studio audience.

== Track listings ==
- CD single
1. "It's Alright Now" — 4:10
2. "It's Alright Now" (Rattling Good Time) — 8:12
3. "It's Alright Now" (Back To Basics Instrumental) — 5:38
- 7" single
1. "It's Alright Now" — 4:15
2. "Scarlet Beautiful" (Naked & Foxy) — 4:10
- 12" single
1. "It's Alright Now" (Rattling Good Time) — 8:12
2. "It's Alright Now" (Back To Basics) — 5:36
3. "It's Alright Now" (Feeling Fine) — 5:34
- Cassette single
1. "It's Alright Now" — 4:15
2. "Scarlet Beautiful" (Naked & Foxy) — 4:10

== Charts ==
Chart (1990)	Peak position
Australia (ARIA)	150
UK Singles (OCC)	48
UK Airplay (Music Week)	42
