= Paul Baines (footballer) =

English footballer

Personal information
- Full name: Paul Baines
- Date of birth: 15 January 1972 (age 54)
- Place of birth: Tamworth, England
- Position: Forward

Senior career*
Years	Team	Apps	(Gls)
1988-1992	Stoke City	2	(0)
–	Tamworth		
–	Atherstone Town		
- * Club domestic league appearances and goals

Paul Baines (born 15 January 1972) is an English former footballer who played in the Football League for Stoke City.

== Career ==
Baines progressed through the youth ranks at the Victoria Ground and towards the end of the 1990–91 season with the club experiencing a terrible season he was handed his professional debut away at Birmingham City by caretaker manager Graham Paddon. He also played in the next away match at Cambridge United.

== Career statistics ==
Club	Season	League			FA Cup		League Cup		Other^{[A]}		Total	
Club	Season	Division	Apps	Goals	Apps	Goals	Apps	Goals	Apps	Goals	Apps	Goals
Stoke City	1990–91	Third Division	2	0	0	0	0	0	0	0	2	0
Career Total			2	0	0	0	0	0	0	0	2	0

A. The "Other" column constitutes appearances and goals in the Football League Trophy.
