= Dan Noble (footballer) =

English footballer

Personal information
- Full name: Daniel William Thomas Noble
- Date of birth: 2 September 1970 (age 56)
- Place of birth: Kingston upon Hull, England
- Position: Goalkeeper

Youth career
- Hull City

Senior career*
Years	Team	Apps	(Gls)
1989–1990	Stoke City	3	(0)
1991–1992	Crewe Alexandra	7	(0)
Total		10	(0)
- * Club domestic league appearances and goals

Daniel William Noble (born 21 September 1970) is an English former footballer who played in the Football League for Crewe Alexandra and Stoke City.

== Career ==
Noble was born in Kingston upon Hull and played in the youth team at local side Hull City before he left for Stoke City in 1989. He made his debut for Stoke on the final day of the 1989–90 season at home against Swindon Town with Stoke already relegated to the third tier. He played just twice in 1990–91 conceding five goals and at the end of the season he was released. He signed for Crewe Alexandra and played nine times for the "Alex" before deciding to pursue a different career.

== Career statistics ==
Club	Season	League			FA Cup		League Cup		Other^{[A]}		Total	
Club	Season	Division	Apps	Goals	Apps	Goals	Apps	Goals	Apps	Goals	Apps	Goals
Stoke City	1989–90	Second Division	1	0	0	0	0	0	0	0	1	0
Stoke City	1990–91	Third Division	2	0	0	0	0	0	0	0	2	0
Crewe Alexandra	1991–92	Fourth Division	7	0	0	0	0	0	2	0	9	0
Career Total			10	0	0	0	0	0	2	0	12	0

A. The "Other" column constitutes appearances and goals in the Football League play-offs and Football League Trophy.
