= The Sun Rising (song) =

Single by The Beloved

from the album Happiness
- B-side: "The Sun Rising (Eurovisionary)"
- Released: 14 October 1989
- Recorded: 1988–89
- Genre: Ambient house; ambient
- Length: 4:59
- Label: WEA
- Songwriters: Jon Marsh; Steve Waddington
- Producer: Martyn Phillips

The Beloved singles chronology
"Your Love Takes Me Higher" (1989)	"The Sun Rising" (1989)	"Hello" (1990)

Music video
- "The Sun Rising" on YouTube

"The Sun Rising" is a song by English electronic music group the Beloved. It was released in October 1989 by WEA as the second single from their second album, Happiness (1990). The song was written by group members Jon Marsh and Steve Waddington, and produced by Martyn Phillips. It became a club favourite and also was the group's first top 40 hit in the UK, peaking at number 26 on the UK Singles Chart in November 1989. In 1997, the song was re-released, reaching number 31 in the UK.

== Sample ==
The female vocal sample in "The Sun Rising" is from a song titled "O Euchari", sung by Emily Van Evera on the album A Feather on the Breath of God by Gothic Voices. The sample was not credited on the release of "The Sun Rising" single. An out-of-court settlement was reached between WEA and Gothic Voices' record label Hyperion Records for this omission.

== Critical reception ==
In 2011, retrospectively, Jon O'Brien from AllMusic complimented the song as "gorgeous", remarking that it first introduced us to "the seductive whispering tones of frontman Jon Marsh and their unique fusion of Balearic beats and ethereal acid-house synths." Upon the release, Bill Coleman from Billboard praised "The Sun Rising" as a "brilliant" and "serene yet captivating house-inflected track". In 1990, another Billboard editor, Larry Flick, wrote, "Former U.K. club smash is given a deep, ambient house redressing that swirls, surrounds, and ultimately envelops the listener. Singer Jon Marsh's low-whisper vocals are a perfect complement." Pan-European magazine Music & Media commented, "House meets early 70s Temptations. A haunting melody and an insistent rhythm." They also complimented it as "excellent new age/house".

Selina Webb from Music Week said, "The refrain comes courtesy of an ethereal chorister, adding to the dewy, other-world mood of this superb subterranean house track. Post-rave drive home music which marks the nearest Beloved have got to recapturing the style of their brilliant indie hit 'Forever Dancing'." Upon the 1997 re-release, Music Week gave "The Sun Rising" four out of five, adding, "A reissue that makes sense. This classic 1989 ambient house hit is reworked by Global Communications into a dreamy drum & bass track, which is already getting Kiss airplay." Gareth Grundy from Select praised it as "a brilliant, proto-'Screamadelica' come-down epic".

== Track listings ==
- 7" single
1. "The Sun Rising" — 4:59
2. "The Sun Rising" (Eurovisionary) — 3:37
- 12" single
1. "The Sun Rising" — 4:59
2. "The Sun Rising" (Gentle Night) — 2:47
3. "The Sun Rising" (Eurovisionary) — 5:09
4. "The Sun Rising" (Deeply Satisfying) — 5:31
- 12" remix single
1. "The Sun Rising" (Il Sole Sorge) — 4:51
2. "The Sun Rising" (Intensità) — 4:49
3. "The Sun Rising" (Danny's "Love Is..." Remix) — 4:29
4. "The Sun Rising" (Son Of The Rising House) — 5:20
- CD mini
1. "The Sun Rising" — 4:59
2. "The Sun Rising" (Eurovisionary) — 3:37
3. "The Sun Rising" (Adam & Eve's House Of The Rising Sun) — 5:16
4. "The Sun Rising" (Gentle Night) — 2:47

== Charts ==
Chart (1989)	Peak position
Europe (Eurochart Hot 100)	69
Ireland (IRMA)	28
UK Singles (OCC)	26

Chart (1997)	Peak position
UK Singles (OCC)	31

== Usage in media ==
- In 1990, the song was used in a commercial for the breakfast cereal Alpen.
- The song makes multiple appearances in the 2005 Channel 4 queer comedy-drama series Sugar Rush.
- The song was also used in 2005 for a segment of Dom Joly's World Shut Your Mouth TV series, 'Royalty on the Beach', which lampooned the German tradition of waking up early on holiday to place towels on sun loungers to reserve the best spots.
- The song features in 2012 PS Vita game Lumines: Electronic Symphony.
- In 2020, the song was used in an advert for online clothing store Kaleidoscope.
