= Happiness (The Beloved album) =

1990 album by The Beloved

Studio album by The Beloved
- Released: 19 February 1990
- Recorded: July 1988 – August 1989
- Genre: Dance-pop; house; synth-pop; baggy
- Length: 45:18
- Label: East West; Atlantic
- Producer: Paul Staveley O'Duffy; Martyn Phillips

The Beloved chronology
Where It Is (1987)	Happiness (1990)	Blissed Out (1990)

Singles from Happiness
- 1. "The Sun Rising" Released: October 1989; 2. "Hello" Released: January 1990; 3. "Your Love Takes Me Higher 1990" Released: March 1990; 4. "Time After Time" Released: May 1990

Happiness is the debut studio album, and second album overall, by English electronic group The Beloved, released in February 1990 in the United Kingdom by East West Records and in the United States by Atlantic Records the following month. The group's first album since slimming down from a four-piece to a duo comprising Jon Marsh and Steve Waddington in 1987, the two members moved away from their previous, New Order-styled sound and drew influence from the late 1980s rave scene in London and from Black American house music.

Recorded with producers Paul Staveley O'Duffy and Martyn Phillips, Happiness exemplifies the Beloved's new house-styled dance-pop material, becoming one of the first albums to fuse house and pop music, and features optimistic lyrics that helped it fit in with the hedonism of the UK's contemporary music scene and the Second Summer of Love. Aided by four charting singles, including the group's breakthrough hit—the ambient-styled "The Sun Rising"—and their first Top 20 success in "Hello", Happiness reached number 14 on the UK Albums Chart and number 154 on the US Billboard 200 chart. It also received critical acclaim, and numerous magazines ranked the album among the greatest of the year.

== Background ==
The Beloved began at the University of Cambridge in 1983; originally named Journey Through, they consisted of Tim Havard, Steve Waddington and vocalist and band leader Jon Marsh, with drummer Guy Gausden joining the following year. Originally drawing from psychedelic music, the group soon renamed itself to The Beloved and changed their sound to one often compared to New Order. Despite releasing several singles, the Happy Now EP and Where It Is compilation album over 1986–87, none of the band's music received notable critical or commercial success, which led to Havard and Gausden leaving the group by the end of 1987, rendering the Beloved a duo of Marsh and Waddington. The group had nonetheless signed a deal with WEA by this point, thanks to the cult success of Where It Is. Having become interested in American dance music after a trip to New York in 1987, Marsh and Waddington quickly became infatuated with the emerging rave music scene in London in 1988, and became fans of acid house. Marsh found the Shoom and Spectrum raves that year life-changing; he later told i-D magazine: "The whole of 1988 from March onwards is a complete blur, an orgy of parties." The duo's experiences with dance music revitalised them musically, and took influence from it, completely changing their direction.

Marsh and Waddington recorded the tracks "Loving Feeling", "Your Love Takes Me Higher" and "I Love You More" in 1988 with producer Paul Staveley O'Duffy. Only the latter two tracks were included on Happiness, although "Loving Feeling" was released as a single in October 1988. It was commercially unsuccessful, as was follow-up single "Your Love Takes Me Higher", which reached number 91 on the UK Singles Chart in January 1989. Nonetheless, The Beloved asked WEA to allow them to record a full LP, with their engineer Martyn Phillips as its producer instead of O'Duffy. They were given the go-ahead and, with a small budget and often working night sessions, The Beloved recorded the rest of Happiness until August 1989, across many recording studios in the UK and US, namely Southlands, Sarm West, Master Rock, First Protocol, Sam Therapy, Lillie Yard, D&D, The Skylight Suite and Parsifal.

== Composition ==
"Above all, its smiley-faced optimism encapsulates the spirit of a time when Brit Pop went supernova: Manchester was on the rise and you could dance all night without being arrested. The liner notes thank 'anyone who has felt that 5am loving feeling' and 'Scarlet Beautiful''s chorus is simply 'love/love/love'."

—Gareth Grundy of Select, reflecting upon Happiness in 1995.

Happiness is a dance-pop album incorporating synth-pop and post-rave styles, most prominently including intense, propulsive club music, in particular American dance music, such as house. The album was among the first to cast house music into a distinctively pop context, and has further been described as a fusion of house and baggy. The lyrics, chiefly written by Marsh, are happy and laden with hopeful optimism, reflecting the hedonism prevalent in the UK's music scene at the time. Writer Colin Larkin recalls Marsh and Waddington promoting the album with "enthusiastic chatter concerning the virtues of floating tanks and hallucinogenic substances." Marsh, who sings with a deep voice, is sometimes accompanied by female backup.

"Hello" is a techno track, taking the form of a list song that juxtaposes the likes of Cannon and Ball with Jean-Paul Sartre, with a chorus of "Jean-Paul Sartre, Zippy, Bungle, Jeffrey Archer." Writer Justin Lewis noted that the juxtaposition of diverse icons was postmodern, while writer Simon Reynolds calls the song "a 'Reasons to Be Cheerful, Part Three' for the MDMA generation." "Your Love Takes Me Higher" is a remix of the band's earlier single. "Time After Time" and "Don't You Worry" feature live violin and piano, as opposed to sampled or synthesised versions of those instruments. In an interview with Keyboard, Marsh explained: "We went with real violins because of the overall feel we wanted. There's something about that quality of a real violin that makes it warmer to most people's ears. Yet on a track like 'Scarlet Beautiful', which is very up and housey, real strings would have been too jarring."

"The Sun Rising" is an ambient-styled track, and features reversed guitars and madrigal singing sampled from an album of sequences and hymns by Hildegard of Bingen entitled A Feather on the Breath of God. The song has gone on to be regarded as a classic of chill-out music. "Up, Up and Away" features lyrics such as "Hallo new day, give the world a message and the message is yes," which Reynolds felt reflected the influence of Marsh's experiences at Shoom.

== Release ==
After the completion of Happiness but prior to its release, "The Sun Rising" was issued as a single and became the band's commercial breakthrough. It entered the UK Singles Chart in October 1989 and peaked at number 26 the following month. "Hello" was issued as the follow-up single and became an international hit, receiving much airplay and earning the duo a reputation as potential "successors to the Pet Shop Boys," recalls Lewis. In the UK, the single entered the charts in January 1990 and peaked at number 19 in February. The reissue version of "Your Love Takes Me Higher" became the album's third hit single reaching number 39 in March. A further single, "Time After Time", reached number 46 on the chart in June. Keyboard magazine, who noted the eclectic nature of Happiness, also noted the diversity between the album's run of singles, saying they "included a tune built around a haunting Renaissance vocal riff, a phone-book recitation of rhymed names, a thumping house cut and, most recently, 'Time After Time', a medium-tempo trance/dance number featuring a real violin section and an acoustic piano solo."

Critic Jason Ankeny writes that the album "achieved significant success both in and out of clubs." Released on 19 February 1990, Happiness was issued in the UK by WEA subsidiary East West Records. It debuted and peaked at number 14 on the UK Albums Chart, and spent fourteen weeks on the chart, including six weeks in the top forty. In the United States, Happiness was released in March by Atlantic Records. It spent nine weeks on the Billboard 200, peaking at number 154 in May 1990. Later in 1990, the album was followed with a remix album entitled Blissed Out, consisting almost entirely of remixes of songs from Happiness. A VHS collection of music videos for the album's singles, also entitled Happiness, was released with a PG certificate by the British Board of Film Classification, but in December 1990, it had to be re-released with an 18 certificate instead, due to the Board becoming aware of the unlisted bonus video for "Your Love Takes Me Higher (Calyx of Isis)", which graphically depicts Jon Marsh having sex with a model. In August 2020, a remastered special edition of Happiness was released by New State Music to celebrate the album's 30th anniversary. CD and digital versions of the re-release include bonus demos, B-sides and remixes from the era.

== Critical reception ==
Professional ratings
Review scores
Source	Rating
AllMusic	4/5 stars
Classic Pop	4.5/5 stars
NME	9/10
Q	4/5 stars
Record Collector	4/5 stars
Record Mirror	4/5
Rolling Stone	3/5 stars
Select	4/5
Smash Hits	7/10
The Village Voice	B

Upon release, Happiness received critical acclaim. It was named a "Staff Selection" in Spin, where reviewer Robin Reinhardt felt that the album's combination of pop and house resulted in a "catchy new disco noise that puts [the Beloved's] predecessors to shame." She concluded that, accented by "an airy female voice," the group "add a new dimension to the dance floor." Despite the rap and house music that inspired the Beloved, Robert Christgau of The Village Voice felt parts of the album resembled acts like the Human League, New Order and Heaven 17, but noted "against all odds, [the Beloved are] fun, even happy." He felt the album's rejection of "idiot pessimism" in favour of "hopeful optimism" was an informed choice, and concluded that the group's "tuneful rhythm tapestry will make you smile." In Mademoiselle, it was listed among the "Editor's Picks", with reviewer Christian Logan Wright commenting that the album's "female backup, ecstatic abandon and three-minute testaments to the omnipotence of love make emotion sexy again."

In a retrospective review, Gareth Grundy of Select wrote that Happiness was "the acceptable pop face" of the Second Summer of Love. He praised its "fantastic, irresistible pop songs", as well as hailing "The Sun Rising" as a "proto-Screamadelica come-down epic." John Bush of AllMusic named Happiness an "Album Pick", and said that although the "post-rave synth-popsters are a bit too heavily tied to the heady days of ABC and Erasure," the album nonetheless "suits its title with a set of undeniably pleasant dance-pop." J. D. Considine defines the Beloved in the third edition of The Rolling Stone Album Guide as sounding like a "darker, less ironic Pet Shop Boys" during the album's best moments. In The Rough Guide to Rock, Justin Lewis highlights Happiness as the best Beloved album, describing it as a "feel-good soundtrack to the early 90s pop and dance scene." He highlighted "Scarlet Beautiful" and "The Sun Rising", the latter of which he called the group's "finest moment." In The Encyclopedia of Popular Music, Colin Larkin commented that the album "perfectly embodied the tripped-out vibes of the times and sealed the Beloved's fashionable success in worldwide territories."

At the end of 1990, numerous magazines featured Happiness in their lists of the best albums of the year; it was ranked 5th by The Face, 19th by Select, 26th in the NME and also in Q magazine's unranked 50 best albums of the year. Radio X also include Happiness in their list of "The Best Albums of 1990". In 1996, Mixmag ranked the album at number 48 in its list of the "Best Dance Albums of All Time", while, in his book Bring the Noise, Simon Reynolds lists the album as an example of the micro-genre he terms "Positivity 1990", alongside records by Deee-Lite, Soul II Soul, De La Soul and A Tribe Called Quest. Critic William Cooper of AllMusic considers Happiness to be the best introduction to the Beloved's music. Gary Mulholland features "The Sun Rising" in his 2002 book This Is Uncool: The 500 Greatest Singles Since Punk and Disco.

== Track listing ==
=== Original 1990 release ===
No.	Title	Writer(s)	Length
1.	"Hello"	Jon Marsh	4:19
2.	"Your Love Takes Me Higher"	Marsh, Steve Waddington	3:40
3.	"Time After Time"	Marsh	4:13
4.	"Don't You Worry"	Marsh	3:51
5.	"Scarlet Beautiful"	Marsh	4:40
6.	"The Sun Rising"	Marsh, Waddington	5:05
7.	"I Love You More"	Marsh	3:56
8.	"Wake Up Soon"	Marsh	5:02
9.	"Up, Up and Away"	Marsh	6:02
10.	"Found"	Marsh	4:24
Total length:			45:18

=== 2020 special edition – vinyl ===
Side A
No.	Title	Writer(s)	Length
1.	"Hello"	Marsh	4:19
2.	"Your Love Takes Me Higher"	Marsh, Waddington	3:40
3.	"Time After Time"	Marsh	4:13

Side B
No.	Title	Writer(s)	Length
4.	"Don't You Worry"	Marsh	3:51
5.	"Scarlet Beautiful"	Marsh	4:40
6.	"I Love You More"	Marsh	3:56

Side C
No.	Title	Writer(s)	Length
7.	"The Sun Rising"	Marsh, Waddington	5:05
8.	"Wake Up Soon"	Marsh	5:02

Side D
No.	Title	Writer(s)	Length
9.	"Up, Up and Away"	Marsh	6:02
10.	"Found"	Marsh	4:24

=== 2020 special edition bonus disc ===
Disc 2 – "The Wolf Studio Recordings"
No.	Title	Writer(s)	Length
11.	"I Love You More (Demo)"	Marsh
12.	"Jackie (Won't You Please Come Home?)"	Waddington, Marsh
13.	"Sally"	Marsh
14.	"My Heart's Desire"	Marsh
15.	"Your Love Takes Me Higher (Demo)"	Marsh, Waddington
16.	"Your Love Takes Me Higher (Piano/303 Demo)"	Marsh, Waddington
17.	"Wake Up Soon (Demo)"	Marsh
18.	"Acid Love" (B-side to 1988 single "Loving Feeling")	Marsh, Waddington
19.	"Acid Love (Acid Dream Remix)"	Marsh, Waddington
20.	"Paradise (My Darling, My Angel)" (B-side to 1989 release of "Your Love Takes Me Higher")	Marsh, Waddington
21.	"Time After Time (Demo)"	Marsh
22.	"Time After Time (Extended Demo Dub)"	Marsh
23.	"Jennifer Smiles"	Marsh
24.	"Pablo" (B-side to 1990 release of "Your Love Takes Me Higher")	Marsh
25.	"The Sun Rising (Evening Session Remix)" (remixed live by Jon Marsh in September 1990 during Mark Goodier's The Evening Session show on BBC Radio 1; originally named "The Too Damn Goodier Mix")	Marsh, Waddington

== Personnel ==
=== The Beloved ===
- Jon Marsh – lead vocals, keyboards, rhythms
- Steve Waddington – guitars, keyboards

=== Additional musicians ===
- Leroy Osborne – backing vocals
- Dee Lewis – backing vocals
- Linda Lewis – backing vocals
- Janette Sewell – backing vocals
- Margo Sagov – backing vocals
- Chyna – backing vocals
- Derek Green – backing vocals
- Andy Caine – backing vocals
- Marc Fox – backing vocals, percussion
- Terry Disley – piano on "Don't You Worry", piano solo on "Up, Up and Away"
- Gavin Wright – violin on "Don't You Worry", "Time After Time"
- Wilfred Gibson – violin on "Don't You Worry", "Time After Time"
- Fred McFarlane – additional programming on "I Love You More"
- Peter Schwartz – additional programming on "I Love You More"

=== Production ===
- Martyn Phillips – production, engineering
- Paul Staveley O'Duffy – production on "Your Love Takes Me Higher" and "I Love You More"
- Daniel Abraham – additional production and remixing on "I Love You More"

== Charts ==
Chart (1990)	Peak position
Australian Albums (ARIA)	104
New Zealand Albums (RMNZ)	43
UK Albums (OCC)	14
US Billboard 200	154

== Certifications ==
Region	Certification	Certified units/sales
United Kingdom (BPI)	Gold	100,000^{^}
^{^} Shipments figures based on certification alone.
