= Blissed Out (The Beloved album) =

Remix album by The Beloved
- Released: Nov 1990
- Genre: Electronic dance; pop; acid house
- Length: 54:10 (LP); 70:04 (CD); 100:00 approx. (MC)
- Label: East West
- Producer: Paul Staveley O'Duffy; Martin Phillips; Jon Marsh; Adam & Eve; Danny Rampling; The Little Sisters; Bill Coleman; Paul Robb; Tony Humphries; Doc Dougherty; Norberto Cotto; The Baby Brothers

The Beloved chronology
Happiness (1990)	Blissed Out (1990)	Conscience (1993)

Professional ratings
Review scores
Source	Rating
AllMusic	2.5/5 stars
NME	7/10
Smash Hits	6.75/10

Blissed Out is a remix album by English electronic group The Beloved, released in 1990. It is a sister release of their studio album Happiness, released earlier that year, which had generated four hit single releases.

== Background ==
The success of The Beloved's previous album pushed the group to first follow it up with a brand-new song, called "It's Alright Now," which failed to make the UK top 40, peaking at number 48, but helped promote the new remix album, mostly being an expanded remodelled version of Happiness, as the title itself suggested. Almost all of the songs from the Happiness album feature on one of the three available editions of Blissed Out, in one or more remixed versions, also including a remix of "It's Alright Now" itself, alongside a couple of tracks which were previously non-album tracks, namely "Acid Love" and "Paradise (My Darling, My Angel)" which were B-sides to the singles "Loving Feeling" and "Your Love Takes Me Higher" respectively.

Blissed Out was also promoted by a related remix EP, featuring a medley of selected remixes from the album, and particularly by a promo of "Up, Up and Away", the one remaining song from Happiness that the label originally intended to release as a further single, before opting for a re-release of "Your Love Takes Me Higher". The album was released in three different editions, varying as for length and track listing, depending upon the related format: the vinyl LP includes 8 tracks; the CD version features 11 tracks; and the MC edition contains 16 tracks, its final song being "Acid Love", which represented the band's first try at a house track and thus paved the way for "The Sun Rising", which soon became a club favourite, and a little later their first UK hit. The latter includes a sample taken from the Hyperion Records recording of "O Euchari" as sung by Emily Van Evera, which was only credited here for the first time, and only on the cassette version, but not on any of the original formats then marketed for the Happiness album, which contained the single version of "The Sun Rising." This step marked a very important achievement for future credits of samples, which became mandatory from then on.

"It's Alright Now" and the Blissed Out album were the last works made by Jon Marsh with original band member Steve Waddington at the time. By 1991, Waddington left the group and was replaced by Jon's wife, Helena, for The Beloved's next album, Conscience.

== Track listings ==
=== LP ===
Side A

1. "Up, Up and Away" (Happy Sexy Mix) – 7:08
2. "Hello" (Honky Tonk) – 6:10
3. "Wake Up Soon" (Something to Believe In) – 6:14
4. "Time After Time" (Muffin Mix) – 6:18

Side B

1. "Pablo" (Special K Dub) – 4:57
2. "The Sun Rising (Norty's Spago Mix) – 7:04
3. "It's Alright Now" (Back to Basics) – 5:35
4. "Your Love Takes Me Higher" (Calyx of Isis) – 10:44

=== CD ===
1. "Up, Up and Away" (Happy Sexy Mix) - 7:08
2. "Hello" (Honky Tonk) - 6:10
3. "Wake Up Soon" (Something to Believe In) - 6:14
4. "Time After Time" (Muffin Mix) - 6:18
5. "Pablo" (Special K Dub) - 4:57
6. "The Sun Rising" (Norty's Spago Mix) - 7:04
7. "It's Alright Now" (Back to Basics) - 5:35
8. "Your Love Takes Me Higher" (Calyx of Isis) - 10:44
9. "Up, Up and Away" (Beautiful Balloon Mix) - 6:51
10. "Hello" (What's All This Then?) - 4:34
11. "The Sun Rising" (Danny's 'Love Is...' Mix) - 4:29

=== Cassette ===
Side A

1. "Up, Up and Away" (Happy Sexy Mix) - 7:08
2. "Hello" (Honky Tonk) - 6:10
3. "Wake Up Soon" (Something to Believe In) - 6:14
4. "Time After Time" (Muffin Mix) - 6:18
5. "Pablo" (Special K Dub) - 4:57
6. "The Sun Rising (Norty's Spago Mix) - 7:04
7. "It's Alright Now" (Back to Basics) - 5:35
8. "Your Love Takes Me Higher" (Calyx of Isis) - 10:44

Side B

1. "Up, Up and Away" (Beautiful Balloon Mix) - 6:51
2. "Hello" (What's All This Then?) - 4:34
3. "The Sun Rising" (Danny's 'Love Is...' Mix) - 4:29
4. "Your Love Takes Me Higher" (Simply Divine) - 5:07
5. "Paradise" (My Darling, My Angel) - 4:36
6. "Time After Time" (Through the Round Window) - 5:00
7. "Don't You Worry" (Timeless Dub) - 4:14
8. "Acid Love" - 5:34

== Singles and promos ==
- 1990 - "It's Alright Now" (UK #48)
- 1990 - "Up, Up and Away" (promo only)
- 1991 - "The Remix EP" (promo medley)

== Personnel ==
=== The Beloved ===
- Jon Marsh – keyboards, vocals, rhythm programming, music, lyrics; production and mixing (track 7)
- Steve Waddington – guitar, keyboards, music, lyrics

=== Remix and production personnel ===
- Martyn Phillips – general production except where stated; additional production (track 8); mix engineer
- Adam & Eve – production (track 5), mixing (track 2 & 5); additional production (track 8); additional production and remix (track 9 & 10)
- Paul Staveley O'Duffy – production (track 8)
- Danny Rampling – additional production and remix (track 1 & 11)
- The Little Sisters – additional production and remix (track 4); additional production (track 2)
- Bill Coleman – post-production and remix (track 3)
- Paul Robb – post-production and remix (track 3)
- Tony Humphries – additional production and remix (track 6)
- Doc Dougherty – mixing (track 6)
- Norberto Cotto – mixing (track 6)
- The Baby Brothers – mixing (track 8)
- Dominique Brethes – mix engineer
- Robin Hancock – mix engineer
- George Holt – mix engineer
- Ingo – mix engineer
- Lloyd Puckitt – mix engineer
- George Shilling – mix engineer
- Nomad Soul – mix engineer
- Ren Swan – mix engineer
- Steve Taylor – mix engineer
- Warner Music Group – publishers

== Charts ==
Chart (1990)	Peak position
UK Albums (OCC)	38
