= David Bright (footballer) =

English footballer

Personal information
- Full name: David Bright
- Date of birth: 5 September 1972 (age 54)
- Place of birth: Bristol, England
- Position: Forward

Youth career
- Stoke City

Senior career*
Years	Team	Apps	(Gls)
1990–1991	Stoke City	1	(0)
–	Strömsnäsbruk IF		
–	Newcastle Town		
- * Club domestic league appearances and goals

David Bright (born 5 September 1972) is an English former footballer who played in the Football League for Stoke City.

== Career ==
Bright was born in Bristol but was signed by Stoke City in the late 1980s. He made just one professional appearance, as a substitute against Reading in November 1990. He later played for Swedish club Strömsnäsbruk IF and Newcastle Town.

== Career statistics ==
Club	Season	League			FA Cup		League Cup		Total	
Club	Season	Division	Apps	Goals	Apps	Goals	Apps	Goals	Apps	Goals
Stoke City	1990–91	Third Division	1	0	0	0	0	0	1	0
Career Total			1	0	0	0	0	0	1	0
