= Sweet Harmony (The Beloved song) =

1993 single by the Beloved

Single by the Beloved

from the album Conscience
- B-side: "Motivation"
- Released: 11 January 1993
- Studio: Sarm West (London, England)
- Genre: Electronica; house; synth-pop
- Length: 5:02
- Label: EastWest
- Songwriters: Jon Marsh; Helena Marsh
- Producers: Jon Marsh; Helena Marsh

The Beloved singles chronology
"It's Alright Now" (1990)	"Sweet Harmony" (1993)	"Celebrate Your Life" / "You've Got Me Thinking" (1993)

Music video
- "Sweet Harmony" on YouTube

30 second sample of “Sweet Harmony", which features an electronica sound with elements of house, synth-pop, and downtempo music, characterised by layered synths, rhythmic percussion, a saxophone, and melodic vocals.

"Sweet Harmony" is a song by British band the Beloved, released on 11 January 1993 by EastWest Records as the first and lead single from their second studio album, Conscience (1993). The song was written and produced by the band's frontman Jon Marsh with his wife, Helena Marsh, and remains the band's biggest hit. It peaked at number eight in the UK and became a club staple. The single was followed by a much talked about music video, directed by Big TV, consisting of a nude Jon Marsh surrounded by nude women in a heaven-like setting. The video was based on the record sleeve on the Jimi Hendrix album Electric Ladyland from 1968.

"Sweet Harmony" was also included on the band's compilation albums Single File in 1997, The Sun Rising in 2005, and Sweet Harmony: The Very Best of the Beloved in 2011.

== Background and release ==
"Sweet Harmony" was written and produced by founder member of the Beloved and singer Jon Marsh and his wife, Helena Marsh. It was also the first single after the departure of Steve Waddington and was recorded at Sarm West Studios in London. It was used to promote the second season of the American soap opera Melrose Place in several European countries. The single was released on 11 January 1993 by label East West.

== Critical reception ==
AllMusic editor Jon O'Brien complimented the song as a "glorious slice of ice-cool synth pop which manages to be both brooding and euphoric at the same time". Larry Flick from Billboard magazine described it as a "thumping dance ditty" with "slight techno nuances, an uplifting lyrical message, and singer Jon Marsh's warm, soothing tones [that] add up to a delightful jam." He added that "lyrically, 'Sweet Harmony' is typical Beloved fare: spiritually uplifting and philosophical." Marisa Fox from Entertainment Weekly said that "whereas Bryan Ferry infused rock with sensuality, Marsh and his wife-partner, Helena, lace their ethereal mix with house grooves that seduce and hypnotize." She noted that the video "features a nude Marsh humming amidst a bevy of bare bohemian babes, all seated in a swirling mist. Music to steam by indeed."

Dave Sholin from the Gavin Report felt that "doing their part to end the divisiveness around the globe, the Beloved do some positive preaching backed by the catchy dance/pop that's their trademark. Nothing like a positive message to inspire hope and encourage unity." Caroline Sullivan from The Guardian felt that Marsh had concocted a "pretty single" in "Sweet Harmony", "which married house rhythms to sinuous pop melodies." Derek Weiler from Kitchener-Waterloo Record named the song a "highlight" of Conscience, complimenting it as "highly enjoyable indeed." In his weekly UK chart commentary, James Masterton noted that "the new Beloved single crashes in at 9 and has to be favoured for a possible No. 1." Paul Lester from Melody Maker viewed it as "a wishy-washy electro-ditty with pure essence-of-fey vocals and a spiritual bleedin' New sodding Year piggin' message of global f*** peace."

Robbert Tilli from Music & Media found that the "synth-dominated tune is a traditional verse-chorus pop song, which means very melodic and radio friendly." Alan Jones from Music Week described it as "slowly throbbing". Rune Slyngstad from Norwegian Nordlandsposten viewed it as "catchy, synth-oriented pop not far from Pet Shop Boys at their best." Anita Naik from Smash Hits felt the song is "wonderful" and "heartfelt stuff". Another Smash Hits editor, Tom Doyle, praised it as "brilliant", saying, "Jon Marsh is a diamond geezer and so it was heartwarming to witness his safe return to the charts with the brilliant 'Sweet Harmony'." Richard Riccio from St. Petersburg Times wrote, "Yes, there is the consistent beat. The lilting 4/4 bounce of the first single [...] tickles the spine as well as the ear. Marsh purrs the vocals like a well-fed feline, the cool detachment of the verse compensated by the singalong chorus and warm saxophone."

== Chart performance ==
"Sweet Harmony" peaked at number three for three weeks in Austria, number six in Germany and Switzerland, number seven in Greece and Italy, and number eight in the United Kingdom. In the latter, it peaked in its second week at the UK Singles Chart, on 24 January 1993. It stayed at that position for two weeks and for ten weeks inside the UK Top 100. On the Music Week Dance Singles chart, the song peaked at number eleven same week. It was also a top-20 hit in Denmark, France, Ireland, and Sweden. On the Eurochart Hot 100, "Sweet Harmony" peaked at number 20 in May 1993. It debuted on the chart fifteen weeks earlier, at number 66 on 30 January, after charting in the UK.

In North America, the song peaked at number 23 on both the US Billboard Dance Club Play and Modern Rock Tracks charts, as well as number 14 on the Billboard Bubbling Under Hot 100 chart. Elsewhere, it was a top-10 hit in Israel and Mexico, and peaked at number 147 in Australia.

== Music video ==
The accompanying music video for "Sweet Harmony" was directed by Big TV. It consisted of a nude and seated Jon Marsh surrounded by nude women – including Tess Daly – lipsynching the lyrics. It is based on the record sleeve on Jimi Hendrix' 1968 album Electric Ladyland, which was taken by photographer David Montgomery. Clouds, fog, and white-out effects were used to create a high contrast, while the participants used their arms, legs and hair to cover themselves. In an interview, Marsh said the video was "not intended to be sexual" and was "as asexual as you can get". The video is supposed to represent unity between humans. It was nominated for the International Viewer's Choice Award for MTV Europe at MTV Europe Music Awards in 1993.

== Impact and legacy ==
British magazine Classic Pop ranked "Sweet Harmony" number two in their list of the top 40 dance tracks from the 90's in 2022.

== Personnel ==
- Keyboards: David Maxwell Clayton, Richard Cottle, Edward Shearmur
- Lute: John Themis
- Saxophone: Nigel Hitchcock
- Guitar: Tony Smith, Neil Taylor
- Percussion: Miles Bould

From the album-wide credits:

- Backing vocals: Beverley Skeete, Derek Green, Sylvia Mason-James
- Assistant engineer: Matt Ellard
- Mix engineer: Ren Swan
- Producer & Written by: Helena Marsh, Jon Marsh
- Recorded by: Paul Wright, Ren Swan
- Additional recording: Dominique Brethes, Steve McLaughlin, Steve Fitzmaurice
- Vocals, keyboards: Jon Marsh

== Track listings ==
- 7-inch single
1. "Sweet Harmony" – 5:02
2. "Motivation" (Energised)
- 12-inch single
1. "Sweet Harmony" (Live The Dream Mix) – 7:15
2. "Sweet Harmony" – 5:02
3. "Motivation" (Empathised) – 6:44
4. "Sweet Harmony" (Fertility Dance Mix) – 5:56
- CD single
1. "Sweet Harmony" – 5:02
2. "Motivation" (Energised)
- CD maxi
1. "Sweet Harmony" – 5:04
2. "Sweet Harmony" (Live The Dream Mix) – 7:15
3. "Motivation" (Exercised) – 7:11
4. "Sweet Harmony" (Love The Dub Mix) – 5:14
- EP
- For the 7-track "Sweet Harmony" EP, see the Conscience album.

== Charts ==
=== Weekly charts ===
Chart (1993)	Peak position
Australia (ARIA)	147
Austria (Ö3 Austria Top 40)	3
Belgium (Ultratop 50 Flanders)	40
Denmark (IFPI)	13
Europe (Eurochart Hot 100)	20
Europe (European Hit Radio)	8
France (SNEP)	16
Germany (GfK)	6
Greece (Pop + Rock)	7
Iceland (Íslenski Listinn Topp 40)	24
Ireland (IRMA)	14
Israel (Israeli Singles Chart)	7
Italy (Musica e dischi)	7
Mexico (AMPROFON)	2
Netherlands (Dutch Top 40)	22
Netherlands (Single Top 100)	21
Sweden (Sverigetopplistan)	14
Switzerland (Schweizer Hitparade)	6
UK Singles (Official Charts)	8
UK Airplay (Music Week)	3
UK Dance (Music Week)	11
UK Club Chart (Music Week)	51
US Bubbling Under Hot 100 (Billboard)	14
US Dance Club Play (Billboard)	23
US Modern Rock Tracks (Billboard)	23

=== Year-end charts ===
Chart (1993)	Position
Europe (Eurochart Hot 100)	47
Europe (European Hit Radio)	40
Germany (Media Control)	31
Israel (Israeli Singles Chart)	47
Netherlands (Dutch Top 40)	176
Sweden (Topplistan)	92
Switzerland (Schweizer Hitparade)	36
UK Singles (OCC)	70

== Certifications ==
Region	Certification	Certified units/sales
Italy (FIMI)	Gold	50,000^{‡}
United Kingdom (BPI)	Silver	200,000^{‡}
^{‡} Sales+streaming figures based on certification alone.

== Release history ==
Region	Date	Format(s)	Label(s)	Ref.
United Kingdom	11 January 1993	7-inch vinyl; 12-inch vinyl; CD; cassette	EastWest	
Australia	28 March 1993	CD; cassette	EastWest	
