= 2001–02 Luton Town F.C. season =

English football club season

Luton Town
2001–02 season
- Chairman: Mike Watson-Challis
- Manager: Joe Kinnear
- Football League Third Division: Second (promoted as runners-up)
- FA Cup: First round
- Football League Cup: First round
- Football League Trophy: Second round
- Top goalscorer: League: Steve Howard (24); All: Steve Howard (24)
- Highest home attendance: 9,585 vs Plymouth Argyle (Football League Third Division, 2 February 2002)
- Lowest home attendance: 5,066 vs Lincoln City (Football League Third Division, 18 September 2001)
- Average home league attendance: 6,853
Home colours	Away colours

The 2001–02 season was the 116th season in the history of Luton Town Football Club. The club's 22nd-place finish in Division Two in 2000–01 meant they competed in Division Three for the first time in 33 years. After a summer of upheaval from manager Joe Kinnear, the club comfortably secured automatic promotion by finishing in second place in the league, 18 points ahead of their nearest rivals. Cup competitions proved to be far less of a success, with Luton exiting the FA Cup, League Cup, and Football League Trophy at the first hurdle.

The 2001–02 season is also notable for Kinnear creating the nucleus of the successful Luton team of future years: centre-back Chris Coyne, midfielders Kevin Nicholls and Ahmet Brković, and striker Steve Howard would all go on to prove themselves as fully adept at playing at a higher level for the club.

This article covers the period from 1 July 2001 to 30 June 2002.

== Background ==
Instability and inexperience had proved to be Luton's downfall in the previous season with two former players, Ricky Hill and Lil Fuccillo, winning just four out of 26 games as managers and ultimately contributing to the club's relegation from Division Two. An under-performing squad, expensive yet underwhelming signings and poor quality, untested players from abroad left the club languishing deep in the relegation zone. Ex-Wimbledon boss Joe Kinnear was appointed, initially, as director of football on 8 February 2001, but his first act in the job was to immediately demote Fuccillo to an assistant role and install himself as manager. Kinnear's arrival saw Luton win five of their next seven games, raising hopes of avoiding relegation. However, the team's good form soon collapsed as they failed to win again that season. The damage had been done long before Kinnear's appointment as Luton fell into the bottom tier of league football for the first time since 1968.

Kinnear began building his own squad over a month before the 2000–01 season had even finished, releasing players he deemed as surplus to requirements and notably signing striker Steve Howard for £50,000 from Northampton Town in March.

== Review ==
=== Pre-season ===
Former Luton Town striker and fan-favourite Mick Harford was installed as first-team coach in early July, as Kinnear began to overhaul his backroom staff as well as playing squad. Former Luton youth player Aaron Skelton arrived from Colchester United on a free transfer to boost the defence, goalkeeper Carl Emberson was drafted in from Walsall, and prolific lower-league striker Carl Griffiths was signed from Leyton Orient for £65,000. Winger Adrian Forbes and midfielder Paul Hughes were signed from Norwich City and Southampton respectively, whilst the only player to leave was Finnish defender Petri Helin. What would prove later to be a shrewd signing was the capture of influential midfielder Kevin Nicholls for £25,000 from Wigan Athletic.

=== August and September ===
Luton began the season with several injuries to key players, including Matthew Spring, Aaron Skelton and Adrian Forbes. The team managed to secure a series of good results despite an ever-changing squad, with just one loss in their first six league games. New signing Carl Griffiths lived up to his goalscoring reputation, hitting the net three times as Luton hovered near the top of the table. Reading knocked Luton out of the League Cup with a 4–0 hammering at the Madejski Stadium.

Meanwhile, members of the playing staff continued to change – right-back Ian Hillier was signed on a three-month loan from Tottenham Hotspur in mid-August and centre-back Russell Perrett was drafted in on a free transfer from Cardiff City. Players from the previous regime, such as Norwegian Kent Karlsen, were released from their contracts as Kinnear looked to trim the squad.

A 2–1 victory over York City on 15 September was marred by an incident involving Steve Howard. With Luton awarded a penalty, the striker took it, but it was promptly saved. However, the referee had seen an infringement and Luton were ordered to re-take the penalty. Despite his team-mates protests, Howard grabbed the ball from captain and designated penalty-taker Skelton and placed it on the spot. Once again, he saw it saved. A seething Howard was immediately substituted for eventual match-winner Ian Hillier. Manager Joe Kinnear later branded Howard a "disgrace", and even considered placing him on the transfer list.

Australian centre-back Chris Coyne signed from Dundee for £50,000 on 17 September on a three-year contract and was immediately placed into the team that drew 1–1 with Lincoln City a day later – a team minus Steve Howard, whom Kinnear had dropped. French winger Jean-Louis Valois was signed on a one-year contract from Lille on 21 September and put in a stunning performance in a 5–1 demolition of Torquay United the next day, setting up two goals and scoring from 40 yards in a game that saw Griffiths score a hat-trick.

Striker Dean Crowe signed on a one-month loan on 28 September from Stoke City after news that leading scorer Carl Griffiths was ruled out through injury; later revealed to be a fractured leg that would keep him out for the rest of the season.

After a 2–1 loss away to Plymouth Argyle ended Luton's seven game unbeaten run, the team found themselves in third place in the table at the end of September.

=== October and November ===
Injuries persisted at Kenilworth Road: Paul Hughes was ruled out for three months; captain Aaron Skelton had suffered a broken foot; striker Andrew Fotiadis was still recovering from an ankle injury, and veteran defender Marvin Johnson required specialist treatment. Ahmet Brković, a Croatian midfielder who had most recently played for Leyton Orient, signed on a free transfer on 4 October.

By the end of October, Luton found themselves topping the table, despite suffering their first home defeat of the season to Rochdale. The Football League Trophy saw an inexperienced Luton side knocked out by non-League Dagenham & Redbridge in the second round.

Players continued to move in and out of the club, with forwards Stuart Douglas and Peter Thomson loaned to Oxford United and Rushden & Diamonds respectively, and both Ian Hillier and Dean Crowe making their own loan moves at Luton permanent; Hillier for £30,000, and Crowe for free. With the loan places in the squad now freed up, Kinnear moved to sign Crewe Alexandra midfielder Kevin Street on a one-month loan.

November saw the team grind to a halt – one win in four games led the club to fall to fifth in the league. Two heavy defeats to Mansfield Town and Macclesfield Town, and a home loss to Hull City, meant the Hatters needed a good spell of form over the winter to maintain their promotion ambitions. Southend United knocked Luton out of the FA Cup at the First Round on 17 November.

=== December and January ===
An outbreak of flu led to the cancellation of Luton's game at Kidderminster Harriers, which, combined with injuries, left Kinnear with fewer than eleven players to choose from.

Defender David Bayliss was signed from Rochdale on 7 December as Luton looked to patch up their injury-hit squad. Bayliss started in the game at Hartlepool United, where Luton returned to winning ways with a 2–1 victory. A swift return to their early season form left Luton safely in the automatic promotion places by mid-January, thanks to an eight-game unbeaten streak and a strong scoring run from Dean Crowe.

Striker Liam George and midfielder Dean Brennan were released from their contracts on 23 December. In addition, Stuart Douglas was sent on a two-month loan to Rushden & Diamonds after his spell at Oxford came to an end. Peter Thomson, after an unsuccessful loan at Rushden, was released by Luton on 31 January.

=== February, March and April ===
Further changes were afoot, with Kinnear signing defender Alan Neilson from Fulham. To balance this, Jude Stirling was sent on loan to neighbouring team Stevenage Borough, which was later converted into a permanent deal. Strikers Gary McSwegan and Steve Kabba were signed on one-month loans from Hearts and Crystal Palace respectively, to provide competition for places up front. Long-term injury victim Stuart Fraser was released on 21 March, bringing an end to a five-year spell at Luton.

Another stutter in the promotion bid came when Luton picked up just five points from a possible eighteen through late-January to mid-February. A 2–0 victory, the only win in this period, over leaders Plymouth Argyle saw the highest attendance at Kenilworth Road in over seven years, when Luton were in Division One, as 9,585 fans packed in. Fellow promotion hopefuls Rochdale ground out a 1–0 victory to close the gap between the clubs, and Scunthorpe United scored a last-minute winner at Kenilworth Road – this saw Luton balanced precariously between the automatic promotion places and the playoffs with around a quarter of the season left to play.

However, a run of twelve consecutive victories, with a 3–1 win away to Swansea City on 30 March clinching the club's first promotion in twenty years, ensured Luton went back to the Second Division with four games left to play, breaking several long-standing club records in the process. Steve Howard scored thirteen goals in those twelve games to finish the season as top scorer of the Third Division with twenty-four goals.

Luton finished a comfortable eighteen points ahead of third-placed Mansfield Town and just five points behind leaders Plymouth Argyle. The club claimed the highest goal difference and goals scored in the league, averaging just over two goals every game. Matthew Taylor, naturally a left-back, but pushed forward by Kinnear often, won the PFA Third Division player of the year award, scoring eleven goals in total. Taylor was also included in the PFA Division Three Team of the Season, the only Luton player to do so.

=== May and June ===
Joe Kinnear immediately set about keeping his squad for the next season, securing contract extensions for Kevin Nicholls, David Bayliss, Alan Neilson, Ahmet Brković and Paul Hughes. Highly rated midfielder Matthew Spring, who had progressed through the youth team and was coming close to the end of his contract, signed a new two-year deal. His fellow academy graduate Matthew Taylor refused a new contract and, as he was under 24 years old, Luton were entitled to a fee from any club that bought his services. That club proved to be Division One side Portsmouth, who offered £150,000. Kinnear reacted furiously, calling the offer "an insult" and exclaiming that "at least Dick Turpin had the decency to wear a mask." The two clubs eventually reached a deal for an initial £400,000, rising to £750,000 based on appearances.

Striker Tony Thorpe returned to the club on 12 June after a four-year absence, signing a two-year contract. Preston North End midfielder and Northern Irish international Steve Robinson joined Luton for a fee of £50,000 two weeks later.

== Match results ==
Luton Town results given first.

=== Legend ===
Win Draw Loss

=== Friendlies ===
Date	Opponent	Venue	Result	Attendance	Scorers	Notes
22 July 2001	Boreham Wood	Away	3–1	N/A	Howard, Griffiths, Mansell	
23 July 2001	Dundee	Away	2–3	0	Griffiths, own goal	^{[A]}
31 July 2001	Queens Park Rangers	Home	1–0	3,049	Griffiths	
4 August 2001	Norwich City	Home	1–3	3,294	Fotiadis	
7 August 2001	Tottenham Hotspur	Home	1–1	9,175	Skelton	

=== Football League Third Division ===
All results, goals, attendances etc. taken from Soccerbase and verified with official Luton Town match reports.

Date	Opponent	Venue	Result	Attendance	Scorers	Notes
11 August 2001	Carlisle United	Away	2–0	4,432	Hughes, Griffiths	
18 August 2001	Cheltenham Town	Home	2–1	6,177	Hughes, Griffiths	
25 August 2001	Bristol Rovers	Away	2–3	9,057	Taylor, Mansell	
27 August 2001	Southend United	Home	2–0	6,496	Griffiths, Fotiadis	
1 September 2001	Exeter City	Away	2–2	3,088	Taylor (2)	
8 September 2001	Oxford United	Home	1–1	6,736	Nicholls	
15 September 2001	York City	Away	2–1	3,247	Griffiths, Hillier	
18 September 2001	Lincoln City	Home	1–1	5,066	Skelton	
22 September 2001	Torquay United	Home	5–1	6,392	Howard, Griffiths (3), Valois	
25 September 2001	Leyton Orient	Away	3–1	6,540	Taylor, Valois, Howard	
29 September 2001	Plymouth Argyle	Away	1–2	5,782	Crowe	
5 October 2001	Darlington	Home	5–2	7,219	Spring, Howard, Crowe, Nicholls (pen), Valois	
13 October 2001	Scunthorpe United	Away	2–0	3,959	Forbes, Perrett	
20 October 2001	Rochdale	Home	0–1	7,696	–	
23 October 2001	Halifax Town	Away	4–2	2,140	Crowe (2), Nicholls, Forbes	
27 October 2001	Swansea City	Home	3–0	6,705	Crowe, Perrett, Forbes	
3 November 2001	Mansfield Town	Away	1–4	5,973	Crowe	
9 November 2001	Shrewsbury Town	Home	1–0	6,809	Spring	
20 November 2001	Hull City	Home	0–1	7,214	–	
24 November 2001	Macclesfield Town	Away	1–4	2,250	Howard	
8 December 2001	Hartlepool United	Away	2–1	3,585	Crowe, Taylor	
15 December 2001	Rushden & Diamonds	Home	1–0	7,495	Crowe	
22 December 2001	Hartlepool United	Home	2–2	6,739	Howard, Johnson	
26 December 2001	Oxford United	Away	2–1	11,121	Crowe, Spring	
29 December 2001	Southend United	Away	2–1	5,973	Crowe, Taylor	
8 January 2002	Kidderminster Harriers	Away	4–1	4,147	Taylor, Spring (2), Howard	
12 January 2002	Cheltenham Town	Away	1–1	5,026	Howard	
19 January 2002	Carlisle United	Home	1–1	6,647	Perrett	
26 January 2002	Darlington	Away	2–3	3,560	Howard, Valois	
2 February 2002	Plymouth Argyle	Home	2–0	9,585	Nicholls (pen), Howard	
9 February 2002	Rochdale	Away	0–1	4,306	–	
16 February 2002	Scunthorpe United	Home	2–3	6,371	Howard, Taylor	
19 February 2002	Bristol Rovers	Home	3–0	5,651	Howard, Coyne, Nicholls (pen)	
23 February 2002	York City	Home	2–1	6,188	Howard (2)	
26 February 2002	Lincoln City	Away	1–0	2,921	Taylor	
2 March 2002	Torquay United	Away	1–0	3,280	Brković	
5 March 2002	Leyton Orient	Home	3–0	6,683	Coyne, Crowe, Forbes	
9 March 2002	Rushden & Diamonds	Away	2–1	5,876	Crowe, Howard	
12 March 2002	Exeter City	Home	3–0	6,327	Howard (2), Taylor	
16 March 2002	Kidderminster Harriers	Home	1–0	6,488	Hughes	
23 March 2002	Halifax Town	Home	5–0	6,830	Spring, Coyne, Howard, Crowe, Valois	
30 March 2002	Swansea City	Away	3–1	5,436	Taylor, Holmes, Howard	
1 April 2002	Mansfield Town	Home	5–3	8,231	Valois, Crowe, Nicholls (pen), Howard (2)	
6 April 2002	Hull City	Away	4–0	9,379	Howard (3), Crowe	
13 April 2002	Macclesfield Town	Home	0–0	7,873	–	
20 April 2002	Shrewsbury Town	Away	2–0	7,858	own goal, Howard	

=== FA Cup ===
Round	Date	Opponent	Venue	Result	Attendance	Scorers	Notes
First round	17 November 2001	Southend United	Away	2–3 (aet)	6,526	Forbes, Brković	

=== Football League Cup ===
Round	Date	Opponent	Venue	Result	Attendance	Scorers	Notes
First round	21 August 2001	Reading	Away	0–4	5,115	–	

=== Football League Trophy ===
Round	Date	Opponent	Venue	Result	Attendance	Scorers	Notes
Second round	30 October 2001	Dagenham & Redbridge	Away	2–3 (aet)	2,433	Brennan, Thomson	^{[B]}

== League table ==
Pos	Team	Pld	W	D	L	GF	GA	GD	Pts	Qualification or relegation
1	Plymouth Argyle (C, P)	46	31	9	6	71	28	+43	102	Promotion to Football League Second Division
2	Luton Town (P)	46	30	7	9	96	48	+48	97	Promotion to Football League Second Division
3	Mansfield Town (P)	46	24	7	15	72	60	+12	79	Promotion to Football League Second Division
4	Cheltenham Town (O, P)	46	21	15	10	66	49	+17	78	Qualification for the Third Division play-offs
5	Rochdale	46	21	15	10	65	52	+13	78	Qualification for the Third Division play-offs

Rules for classification: 1) Points; 2) Goal difference; 3) Goals scored
(C) Champions; (O) Play-off winners; (P) Promoted

== Player statistics ==
Last match played on 20 April 2002. Players with a zero in every column only appeared as unused substitutes.

No.	Pos.	Name	League		FA Cup		League Cup		FL Trophy		Total		Discipline	
No.	Pos.	Name	Apps	Goals	Apps	Goals	Apps	Goals	Apps	Goals	Apps	Goals	Yellow card	Red card
1	GK	(England) Mark Ovendale	13	0	0	0	0	0	1	0	14	0	1	0
2	DF	(England) Aaron Skelton	9	1	1	0	0	0	0	0	10	1	0	0
4	MF	(England) Matthew Spring	40	6	1	0	0	0	0	0	41	6	4	0
5	DF	(England) Russell Perrett	40 (1)	3	0	0	1	0	0	0	41 (1)	3	6	0
6	DF	(England) Marvin Johnson	11 (7)	1	0	0	1	0	1	0	12 (7)	1	2	0
7	MF	(England) Adrian Forbes	15 (25)	4	1	1	1	0	0	0	17 (25)	5	6	0
8	MF	(England) Kevin Nicholls	41	5	0	0	1	0	0	0	42	5	14	1
9	FW	(England) Stuart Douglas	2 (7)	0	0	0	0 (1)	0	0	0	2 (8)	0	2	0
10	FW	(Wales) Carl Griffiths	10	7	0	0	1	0	0	0	11	7	2	0
11	FW	(Republic of Ireland) Liam George	2 (2)	0	0 (1)	0	0	0	1	0	3 (3)	0	1	0
12	DF	(Australia) Chris Coyne	29 (2)	3	0	0	0	0	0	0	29 (2)	3	4	1
13	DF	(Scotland) Stuart Fraser	0	0	0	0	0	0	1	0	1	0	0	0
14	FW	(England) Andrew Fotiadis	0 (8)	1	0 (1)	0	0	0	1	0	2 (9)	1	0	0
15	DF	(England) Matthew Taylor	43	11	1	0	1	0	0	0	45	11	7	0
16	GK	(England) Carl Emberson	33	0	1	0	1	0	0	0	35	0	2	0
17	DF	(Barbados) Emmerson Boyce	30 (7)	0	0	0	1	0	0	0	31 (7)	0	5	0
18	DF	(England) Adam Locke	1 (2)	0	0	0	0	0	0	0	1 (2)	0	0	0
19	FW	(Scotland) Steve Howard	42	24	0	0	1	0	0	0	43	24	11	0
20	MF	(England) Peter Holmes	4 (3)	1	1	0	0 (1)	0	1	0	6 (4)	1	1	0
21	DF	(England) Richard Dryden	2 (1)	0	1	0	0 (1)	0	1	0	4 (1)	0	1	0
22	MF	(Republic of Ireland) Dean Brennan	0	0	1	0	0	0	1	1	2	1	0	0
23	DF	(England) Jude Stirling	1	0	0	0	0	0	0 (1)	0	1 (1)	0	0	0
24	GK	(England) Scott Ward	0	0	0	0	0	0	0	0	0	0	0	0
25	MF	(Republic of Ireland) Brendan Mcnamara	0	0	0	0	0	0	0	0	0	0	0	0
26	FW	(England) Peter Thomson	0	0	0	0	0	0	1	1	1	1	0	0
27	MF	(England) Paul Hughes	12 (10)	3	0	0	1	0	0	0	13 (10)	3	5	2
28	MF	(France) Jean-Louis Valois	32 (2)	6	0	0	0	0	0	0	32 (2)	6	5	0
30	DF	(England) David Bayliss	15 (3)	0	0	0	0	0	0	0	15 (3)	0	4	1
31	MF	(England) Kevin Street	1 (1)	0	0	0	0	0	0	0	1 (1)	0	0	0
32	MF	(England) Lee Mansell	6 (5)	1	0	0	1	0	1	0	8 (5)	1	0	0
33	DF	(Wales) Ian Hillier	11 (12)	1	1	0	0	0	0	0	12 (12)	1	5	1
34	FW	(England) Dean Crowe	33 (2)	15	1	0	0	0	0	0	34 (2)	15	3	0
35	MF	(Croatia) Ahmet Brković	17 (4)	1	1	1	0	0	0	0	18 (4)	2	5	0
38	DF	(England) Rob Gillman	0	0	0	0	0	0	1	0	1	0	0	0
39	FW	(Republic of Ireland) Daryl Murphy	0	0	0	0	0	0	0	0	0	0	0	0
40	MF	(Republic of Ireland) Stephen O'Leary	0	0	0	0	0	0	0	0	0	0	0	0
41	FW	(England) James Osborn	0	0	0	0	0	0	0	0	0	0	0	0
42	FW	(Scotland) Gary McSwegan	2 (1)	0	0	0	0	0	0	0	2 (1)	0	0	0
43	DF	(Wales) Alan Neilson	8	0	0	0	0	0	0	0	8	0	2	0
44	FW	(England) Steve Kabba	0 (3)	0	0	0	0	0	0	0	0 (3)	0	0	0

== Managerial statistics ==
Only competitive games from the 2001–02 season are included.

Name	Nat.	From	To	Record							Honours
Name	Nat.	From	To	PLD	W	D	L	GF	GA	W%	Honours
Joe Kinnear	(Republic of Ireland)	8 February 2001	23 May 2003	49	30	7	12	100	58	61.2	Promoted to Second Division as runners-up

== Awards ==
Awarded on 21 April 2002.

Award	Name	No.	Pos.	Notes
Player of the Season	(Scotland) Steve Howard	19	FW	
Players' Player of the Season	(Scotland) Steve Howard/ (England) Matthew Taylor	19/15	FW/DF	^{[C]}
Young Player of the Season	(Republic of Ireland) Kevin Foley	–	DF	
Young Members' Player of the Season	(England) Kevin Nicholls	8	DF	
Goal of the Season	(France) Jean-Louis Valois	28	MF	^{[D]}

== Transfers ==
=== In ===
Date	Player	From	Fee	Ref.
4 July 2001	(England) Aaron Skelton	Colchester United	Free	
10 July 2001	(Wales) Carl Griffiths	Leyton Orient	£65,000	
14 July 2001	(England) Carl Emberson	Walsall	Free	
16 July 2001	(England) Adrian Forbes	Norwich City	£60,000	
9 August 2001	(England) Kevin Nicholls	Wigan Athletic	£25,000	
10 August 2001	(England) Russell Perrett	Cardiff City	Free	
10 August 2001	(England) Paul Hughes	Southampton	Free	
17 September 2001	(Australia) Chris Coyne	Dundee	£50,000	
21 September 2001	(France) Jean-Louis Valois	Lille	Free	
4 October 2001	(Croatia) Ahmet Brković	Leyton Orient	Free	
30 October 2001	(England) Dean Crowe	Stoke City	Free	
8 November 2001	(Wales) Ian Hillier	Tottenham Hotspur	£30,000	
7 December 2001	(England) David Bayliss	Rochdale	Free	
22 February 2002	(Wales) Alan Neilson	Fulham	Free	
12 June 2002	(England) Tony Thorpe	Bristol City	Free	
24 June 2002	(Northern Ireland) Steve Robinson	Preston North End	£50,000	

=== Out ===
Date	Player	To	Fee	Ref.
18 July 2001	(Finland) Petri Helin	Stockport County	Free	
21 August 2001	(England) Dean Standen	Released		
14 September 2001	(Norway) Kent Karlsen	Released		
23 December 2001	(Republic of Ireland) Dean Brennan	Released		
23 December 2001	(Republic of Ireland) Liam George	Released		
31 January 2002	(England) Peter Thomson	Released		
20 March 2002	(England) Jude Stirling	Stevenage Borough	Free	
21 March 2002	(Scotland) Stuart Fraser	Released		
6 June 2002	(England) Matthew Taylor	Portsmouth	£400,000	

=== Loans in ===
Date	Player	From	End date	Ref.
18 August 2001	(Wales) Ian Hillier	Tottenham Hotspur	8 November 2001	
28 September 2001	(England) Dean Crowe	Stoke City	28 October 2001	
19 November 2001	(England) Kevin Street	Crewe Alexandra	19 December 2001	
15 February 2002	(Scotland) Gary McSwegan	Hearts	15 March 2002	
28 March 2002	(England) Steve Kabba	Crystal Palace	21 April 2002	

=== Loans out ===
Date	Player	To	End date	Ref.
23 October 2001	(England) Stuart Douglas	Oxford United	23 November 2001	
6 November 2001	(England) Peter Thomson	Rushden & Diamonds	6 January 2002	
28 November 2001	(England) Scott Ward	Boreham Wood	28 February 2002	
26 November 2001	(England) Richard Dryden	Scarborough	29 December 2001	
19 January 2002	(England) Stuart Douglas	Rushden & Diamonds	19 March 2002	
14 February 2002	(England) Jude Stirling	Stevenage Borough	19 March 2002	
13 March 2002	(Republic of Ireland) Daryl Murphy	Harrow Borough	21 April 2002	

== See also ==
- List of Luton Town F.C. seasons

== Footnotes ==
A. Behind closed-doors friendly.
B. Luton received a bye into the Southern Section Second Round.
C. Howard and Taylor shared the Players' Player of the Season award.
D. The goal of the season was chosen as Jean-Louis Valois' strike against Torquay United on 22 September 2001.
