= Paulo Gomes (footballer, born 4 March 1975) =

Portuguese footballer

Personal information
- Full name: Paulo Jorge Sousa Gomes
- Date of birth: 4 March 1975 (age 51)
- Place of birth: Viseu, Portugal
- Height: 1.72 m (5 ft 7 1/2 in)
- Position: Midfielder

Youth career
- 1987–1994: Académico Viseu

Senior career*
Years	Team	Apps	(Gls)
1994–1995	Académico Viseu	4	(0)
1995–1996	Tondela	24	(1)
1996–1997	Académico Viseu	13	(0)
1997–1998	Lousada	30	(0)
1998–2001	Vitória Guimarães	38	(0)
2001–2002	Braga	23	(0)
2002–2007	União Leiria	126	(2)
2007	Paços Ferreira	2	(0)
2008	Penafiel	8	(0)
2008–2009	Atromitos	17	(0)
2009–2010	Académico Viseu	11	(0)
Total		296	(3)

Managerial career
- 2010–2011: Académico Viseu
- 2016: Salgueiros
- * Club domestic league appearances and goals

Paulo Jorge Sousa Gomes (born 4 March 1975) is a Portuguese retired footballer who played as a defensive midfielder.

He amassed Primeira Liga totals of 189 games and two goals during exactly ten seasons, representing mainly União de Leiria (five years) and Vitória de Guimarães (three) in the competition.

== Football career ==
During his Portuguese career, Viseu-born Gomes represented Académico de Viseu FC, C.D. Tondela, A.D. Lousada, Vitória de Guimarães, S.C. Braga, U.D. Leiria, F.C. Paços de Ferreira and F.C. Penafiel. He made his Primeira Liga debut for Guimarães, against S.C. Salgueiros in a 2–3 away loss on 12 September 1998 – coach Zoran Filipović handed him his first chance.

Almost ten years later, Gomes contributed with two league games as Paços achieved an historical qualification to the UEFA Cup. He finished the season at second division side Penafiel, however.

Gomes moved abroad for the 2008–09 campaign, signing with Atromitos Yeroskipou in the Cypriot First Division and joining, among other compatriots, former Leiria teammate Hugo Costa. He subsequently returned to Portugal and Viseu (with the club now in the third level), retiring in June 2010 at the age of 35.
