= 1996–97 Stoke City F.C. season =

Stoke City
1996–97 season
- Chairman: Peter Coates
- Manager: Lou Macari
- Stadium: Victoria Ground
- Football League First Division: 12th (64 Points)
- FA Cup: Third Round
- League Cup: Fourth Round
- Top goalscorer: League: Mike Sheron (18); All: Mike Sheron (23)
- Highest home attendance: 22,500 vs West Bromwich Albion (4 May 1997)
- Lowest home attendance: 7,456 vs Charlton Athletic (4 December 1996)
- Average home league attendance: 12,751
Home colours

The 1996–97 season was Stoke City's 90th season in the Football League and 34th in the second tier. It was also Stoke's final season at their Victoria Ground.

After 119 years Stoke were all set to move to a new stadium with the 1996–97 season confirmed as the final season at the Victoria Ground. With Stoke agreeing with the council to pay £6 million towards the cost, manager Lou Macari had no money to spend on new players having to rely on free or cheap transfers and loan signings instead. It was a very inconsistent season results wise as Stoke finished in 12th position with 64 points. The final league match at the Victoria Ground saw a repeat of the first league match against West Bromwich Albion, Stoke won 2–1 with Graham Kavanagh scoring Stoke's final goal at the Vic. Stoke moved to the Britannia Stadium ahead of the 1997–98 season.

== Season review ==
=== League ===
The final season at the Victoria Ground was a big milestone in the club's history and was met with mixed reaction from the club's supporters, some of whom were happy to move and some who wanted the Victoria Ground to remain. The first ramifications of the move became clear in the summer of 1996 as a number of players wanted a move away as the club began trying to find the £6 million they need. Nigel Gleghorn and Vince Overson were the first to depart both joining Burnley. Funds were generated by the sale of Graham Potter to Southampton for £300,000 and Lee Sandford to Sheffield United for £450,000. The board did permit Macari to spend £200,000 on Richard Forsyth who became the club's first player signed for a fee since 1994.

With the club losing three very good players the supporters were downbeat about the team's prospects ahead of the 1996–97 season. So an opening five-match unbeaten run took many by surprise and Stoke were early season table-toppers as Macari won the manager of the month award. A 3–0 defeat at Barnsley brought reality back and prompted the signings of Gerry McMahon and Graham Kavanagh and the sale of John Dreyer. There were some serious questions now being raised as to how Stoke could afford the £6 million needed for their new stadium and they found part of the answer as a deal was struck with the Britannia building society who bought the naming rights to the stadium as well as shirt sponsorship for around £1.3 million, meaning the new ground would be known as the Britannia Stadium.

On the pitch Stoke won one match in seven and went from promotion contenders to mid-table also-rans. And with Macari struggling for players he promoted Andy Griffin to the first team as Stoke's away form continued to be dire. They lost eight of their final nine away fixtures scoring just once which was an own goal. However, their home form held up as the landmark games came and went. Stoke won the last evening game and drew the last Saturday match, while the final Potteries derby at the Vic was won 2–0.

The final league match at the Victoria Ground saw a re-run of the first with Stoke coming up against West Bromwich Albion in a carnival atmosphere. Stoke won 2–1 with Gerry McMahon and Graham Kavanagh scoring Stoke's goals. However manager Lou Macari announced he was leaving at the end of the season which was a surprise but he was 'stripped of his duties' before he left and later launched a lawsuit against Peter Coates for wrongful dismissal. Less of a surprise was the departure of Mike Sheron who joined Queens Park Rangers for £2.75 million exactly the amount Stoke needed to make up their contribution to the cost of the new stadium. And so Stoke went into a new era at the Britannia Stadium with no manager and their best player gone.

=== FA Cup ===
Stoke suffered a poor defeat at home in the third round losing 1–0 to Stockport County.

=== League Cup ===
Stoke edged past Northampton Town and drew Arsenal in the third round. After a 1–1 draw at home Arsenal proved too strong at Highbury running out 5–2 winners.

== Final league table ==
Pos	Team	Pld	W	D	L	GF	GA	GD	Pts
10	Birmingham City	46	17	15	14	52	48	+4	66
11	Tranmere Rovers	46	17	14	15	63	56	+7	65
12	Stoke City	46	18	10	18	51	57	−6	64
13	Norwich City	46	17	12	17	63	68	−5	63
14	Manchester City	46	17	10	19	59	60	−1	61

Rules for classification: 1) Points; 2) Goals scored; 3) Goal difference

== Results ==
=== Legend ===
Win	Draw	Loss

=== Football League First Division ===
Match	Date	Opponent	Venue	Result	Attendance	Scorers
1	17 August 1996	Oldham Athletic	A	2–1	8,021	Sheron (2) 27', 43'
2	24 August 1996	Manchester City	H	2–1	21,116	Forsyth 27', Sheron 32'
3	28 August 1996	Bradford City	H	1–0	11,918	Sheron 90' (pen)
4	31 August 1996	Reading	A	2–2	13,540	Sheron 25', Forsyth 76'
5	7 September 1996	Crystal Palace	H	2–2	13,540	Sheron 20', Dreyer 32'
6	10 September 1996	Barnsley	A	0–3	11,696	
7	14 September 1996	Birmingham City	A	1–3	18,612	Forsyth 66'
8	22 September 1996	Huddersfield Town	H	3–2	9,147	Gayle 41', Sheron (2) 77', 85'
9	28 September 1996	Bolton Wanderers	A	1–1	16,195	Kavanagh 90'
10	13 October 1996	Port Vale	A	1–1	14,396	Keen 65'
11	16 October 1996	West Bromwich Albion	A	2–0	16,501	Wallace 33', Forsyth 72'
12	19 October 1996	Sheffield United	H	0–4	13,581	
13	26 October 1996	Portsmouth	H	3–1	10,259	McMahon (2) 59', 75', Sheron 71'
14	29 October 1996	Oxford United	A	1–4	6,381	Sheron 59'
15	2 November 1996	Queens Park Rangers	A	1–1	7,354	Kavanagh 4'
16	16 November 1996	Grimsby Town	A	1–1	5,601	Forsyth 30'
17	23 November 1996	Southend United	H	1–2	12,821	Forsyth 52'
18	30 November 1996	Portsmouth	A	0–1	7,749	
19	4 December 1996	Charlton Athletic	H	1–0	7,456	Sheron 49'
20	7 December 1996	Tranmere Rovers	H	2–0	9,931	Sheron 27', Higgins 82' (o.g.)
21	14 December 1996	Swindon Town	H	2–0	10,102	Stein (2) 44', 64'
22	21 December 1996	Ipswich Town	A	1–1	10,159	Stein 23'
23	26 December 1996	Barnsley	H	1–0	19,025	Sheron 72'
24	1 January 1997	Huddersfield Town	A	1–2	12,019	Stein 18'
25	10 January 1997	Birmingham City	H	1–0	10,049	Wallace 18'
26	18 January 1997	Charlton Athletic	A	2–1	9,901	Sheron (2) 42', 43'
27	22 January 1997	Norwich City	H	1–2	10,179	Stein 14'
28	29 January 1997	Bolton Wanderers	H	1–2	15,645	Macari 84'
29	1 February 1997	Wolverhampton Wanderers	A	0–2	27,408	
30	7 February 1997	Oxford United	H	2–1	8,609	MacKenzie 9', Macari 37'
31	15 February 1997	Southend United	A	1–2	4,625	Harris 70' (o.g.)
32	22 February 1997	Queens Park Rangers	H	0–0	13,121	
33	28 February 1997	Tranmere Rovers	A	0–0	9,127	
34	5 March 1997	Grimsby Town	H	3–1	8,621	Southall 48' (o.g.), Kavanagh 50', Griffin 78'
35	8 March 1997	Ipswich Town	H	0–1	11,933	
36	15 March 1997	Swindon Town	A	0–1	8,879	
37	18 March 1997	Wolverhampton Wanderers	H	1–0	15,683	Forsyth 47'
38	22 March 1997	Manchester City	A	0–2	28,497	
39	29 March 1997	Oldham Athletic	H	2–1	11,755	Sheron 17', Macari 40'
40	31 March 1997	Bradford City	A	0–1	13,579	
41	5 April 1997	Reading	H	1–1	9,961	Forsyth 65'
42	12 April 1997	Norwich City	A	0–2	13,805	
43	15 April 1997	Crystal Palace	A	0–2	11,382	
44	20 April 1997	Port Vale	H	2–0	16,246	Sheron (2) 44', 85'
45	25 April 1997	Sheffield United	A	0–1	25,596	
46	5 May 1997	West Bromwich Albion	H	2–1	22,500	McMahon 33', Kavanagh 69'

=== FA Cup ===
Round	Date	Opponent	Venue	Result	Attendance	Scorers
R3	15 January 1997	Stockport County	H	0–2	9,961	

=== League Cup ===
Round	Date	Opponent	Venue	Result	Attendance	Scorers
R2 1st Leg	18 September 1996	Northampton Town	H	1–0	6,093	Worthington 60'
R2 2nd Leg	24 September 1996	Northampton Town	A	2–1 (aet)	5,088	Sheron (2) 100', 108'
R3	23 October 1996	Arsenal	H	1–1	20,804	Sheron 26'
R3 Replay	11 November 1996	Arsenal	A	2–5	33,961	Sheron (2) 35', 88'

=== Friendlies ===
Date	Opponent	Venue	Result	Scorers
3 August 1996	Dunfermline Athletic	A	2–2	Beeston, P Macari
4 August 1996	Hibernian	A	0–1	
5 August 1996	Carlisle United	A	1–0	M Macari
10 August 1996	Shrewsbury Town	A	0–1	
11 August 1996	Newcastle Town	A	1–0	M Macari
13 August 1996	Osasuna	H	2–0	Devlin (2)

== Squad statistics ==
Pos.	Name	League		FA Cup		League Cup		Total		Discipline	
Pos.	Name	Apps	Goals	Apps	Goals	Apps	Goals	Apps	Goals	Yellow card	Red card
GK	(England) Carl Muggleton	33	0	0	0	4	0	37	0	0	0
GK	(England) Mark Prudhoe	13	0	1	0	0(1)	0	14(1)	0	0	0
DF	(Republic of Ireland) Wesley Byrne	0	0	0	0	0	0	0	0	0	0
DF	(Portugal) Hugo Costa	1(1)	0	0	0	1(1)	0	2(2)	0	1	0
DF	(England) Ian Cranson	6	0	0	0	0	0	6	0	1	0
DF	(England) John Dreyer	12	1	0	0	3	0	15	1	2	0
DF	(England) Andy Griffin	29(5)	1	1	0	0(1)	0	30(6)	1	2	0
DF	(Scotland) Mark McNally	3	0	0	0	0	0	3	0	0	0
DF	(England) Ally Pickering	39(1)	0	1	0	4	0	44(1)	0	3	0
DF	(Iceland) Lárus Sigurðsson	45	0	1	0	4	0	50	0	8	1
DF	(England) Ray Wallace	45	2	1	0	4	0	50	2	9	0
DF	(England) Justin Whittle	35(2)	0	1	0	2	0	38(2)	0	5	0
MF	(England) Carl Beeston	17(1)	0	0	0	0	0	17(1)	0	2	0
MF	(Scotland) Mark Devlin	13(8)	0	1	0	3	0	17(8)	0	2	0
MF	(England) Sean Flynn	5	0	0	0	0	0	5	0	1	0
MF	(England) Richard Forsyth	40	8	1	0	3	0	44	8	0	0
MF	(England) Steve Jagielka	0	0	0	0	0	0	0	0	0	0
MF	(Republic of Ireland) Graham Kavanagh	32(6)	4	1	0	2	0	35(6)	4	3	0
MF	(England) Kevin Keen	5(11)	1	0	0	2(2)	0	7(13)	1	0	0
MF	(England) Neil MacKenzie	5(17)	1	0(1)	0	0	0	5(18)	1	1	0
MF	(Northern Ireland) Gerry McMahon	31(4)	3	1	0	3(1)	0	35(5)	3	1	0
MF	(England) Kofi Nyamah	0(7)	0	0	0	0	0	0(7)	0	0	0
MF	(England) Simon Rodger	5	0	0	0	0	0	5	0	0	0
MF	(England) Graham Stokoe	0(2)	0	0	0	0	0	0(2)	0	1	0
MF	(Northern Ireland) Nigel Worthington	12	0	0	0	3	1	15	1	1	0
FW	(England) Martin Carruthers	0(1)	0	0	0	0(1)	0	0(2)	0	0	0
FW	(England) John Gayle	8(4)	1	0	0	2	0	10(4)	1	1	0
FW	(Scotland) Mike Macari	15(15)	3	0(1)	0	0(3)	0	15(19)	3	0	0
FW	(England) Mike Sheron	41	18	1	0	4	5	46	23	1	0
FW	(England) Mark Stein	11	5	0	0	0	0	11	5	1	0
FW	(England) Simon Sturridge	5	0	0	0	0	0	5	0	0	0
–	Own goals	–	3	–	0	–	0	–	3	–	–
