= Graham Stokoe =

English footballer

Personal information
- Full name: Graham Lloyd Stokoe
- Date of birth: 17 December 1975 (age 50)
- Place of birth: Newcastle-upon-Tyne, England
- Position: Midfielder

Youth career
- 1993–1995: Newcastle United

Senior career*
Years	Team	Apps	(Gls)
1995–1997	Stoke City	2	(0)
1995–1996	→ Hartlepool United (loan)	8	(0)
1996–1998	Hartlepool United	20	(0)
1998	Blyth Spartans		
- * Club domestic league appearances and goals

Graham Lloyd Stokoe (born 17 December 1975) is an English former footballer who played in the Football League for Hartlepool United and Stoke City.

== Career ==
Stokoe was born in Newcastle-upon-Tyne and began his career with Newcastle United before joining Stoke City in 1995. He struggled to settle in the area and moved back up north to Hartlepool United where he played eight matches in 1995–96. He made two substitute appearances for Stoke in 1996–97 both away at Portsmouth and then Huddersfield Town. He left in 1998 and made a return to Hartlepool United playing 23 matches for Mick Tait's side in 1998–99. He later played for non-league Blyth Spartans.

== Career statistics ==
Club	Season	League			FA Cup		League Cup		Other^{[A]}		Total	
Club	Season	Division	Apps	Goals	Apps	Goals	Apps	Goals	Apps	Goals	Apps	Goals
Stoke City	1995–96	First Division	0	0	0	0	0	0	0	0	0	0
Stoke City	1996–97	First Division	2	0	0	0	0	0	0	0	2	0
Stoke City	1997–98	First Division	0	0	0	0	0	0	0	0	0	0
Stoke City	Total		2	0	0	0	0	0	0	0	2	0
Hartlepool United (loan)	1995–96	Third Division	8	0	0	0	0	0	0	0	8	0
Hartlepool United	1998–99	Third Division	20	0	2	0	0	0	1	0	23	0
Career Total			30	0	2	0	0	0	1	0	33	0

A. The "Other" column constitutes appearances and goals in the Football League Trophy.
