= Chris Coyne =

Australian soccer player and coach

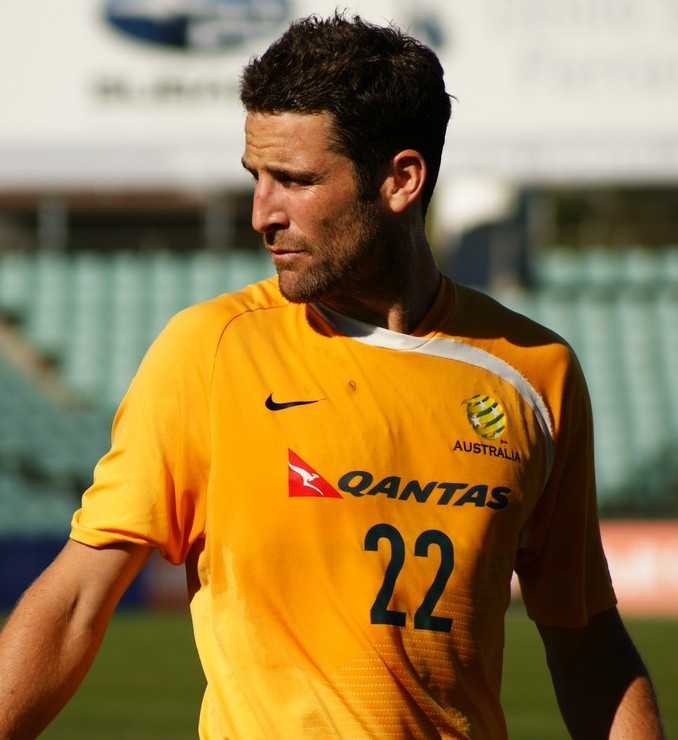

Personal information
- Full name: Christopher John Coyne
- Date of birth: 20 December 1978 (age 47)
- Place of birth: Brisbane, Australia
- Height: 1.85 m (6 ft 1 in)
- Position: Centre back

Senior career*
Years	Team	Apps	(Gls)
1995–1996	Perth SC	15	(0)
1996–2000	West Ham United	1	(0)
1998	→ Brentford (loan)	7	(0)
1999	→ Southend United (loan)	1	(0)
2000–2001	Dundee	20	(0)
2001–2008	Luton Town	221	(14)
2008–2009	Colchester United	32	(1)
2009–2012	Perth Glory	32	(0)
2010	→ Liaoning Whowin (loan)	20	(0)
Total		349	(15)

International career^{‡}
1995	Australia U-17	7	(0)
1999–2000	Australia U-23	8	(0)
2008–2009	Australia	7	(0)

Managerial career
- 2013–: Bayswater City SC
- 2014: Western Australia
- 2016: Western Australia
- 2020–: Perth Glory (NPL)
- 2022–: Perth Glory (assistant coach)
- * Club domestic league appearances and goals as of 22 April 2012 ‡ National team caps and goals as of 19 November 2010

Christopher John Coyne (born 20 December 1978) is an Australian former soccer player and coach who is currently head of Perth Glory Youth NPL in National Premier Leagues Western Australia (NPLWA). In a 17-year career as a player, Coyne appeared for clubs in Australia, England and China, most significantly for Luton Town for whom he appeared 221 times between 2001 and 2008. He played seven times for Australia in 2008 and 2009.

== Club career ==
He began his career with Perth S.C. before moving to England in 1996 to join West Ham United. He made his only first team appearance for West Ham when he came on as a substitute in a league game against Leeds United on 1 May 1999; a game which West Ham lost 5-1 and had three players sent off. He spent a season at Scottish Premier League club Dundee and then joined English Football League club, Luton Town, in 2001, where he spent six and a half years, making over 200 league appearances and twice winning promotion. He joined Colchester United in 2008, leaving the club in July 2009 by mutual consent. He made his international debut in June 2008 and has made seven appearances for Australia.

Coyne, who is the son of former Brisbane City NSL player and Australian International John Coyne and older brother of Jamie Coyne of Perth Glory, started his career with Australia side Perth S.C. before a £20 000 move to England with West Ham United in January 1996, where he was part of the West Ham youth team that reached the FA Youth Cup final in 1996. After loan spells at Brentford and Southend and one appearance for West Ham against Leeds United, Coyne moved to Scottish Premier League club Dundee on a free transfer in March 2000. He made his debut for Dundee in August 2000, and made 28 appearances in all competitions during the 2000–01 season.

At the beginning of the 2001–02 season, he joined English Division Three club Luton Town for a transfer fee of £50,000. Manager Joe Kinnear described him as "22 [years old], six-foot two, an Australian international ... big and strong and uncompromising. He can pass with both feet. He reads it well, and he's young enough to improve." He scored an own goal on his debut for Luton against Lincoln City in September 2001, but successfully established himself in the first team, making 31 appearances in that season, despite suffering a knee ligament in December 2001 that sidelined him for several weeks, and helping Luton to set a club record of winning twelve successive games and to promotion to Division Two.

Coyne made almost 100 appearances for Luton over the next two seasons, and agreed a new two-year contract in May 2004. He made a further 44 appearances in the 2004–05 season, as Luton won the Football League One championship. He won a Football League's Player of the Month Award for April 2005, and was named in the PFA League One Team of the Season. Coyne struggled with injuries in the 2005–06 season, ultimately requiring knee surgery in April 2006, which ended his season. Coyne signed a new three-year contract in August 2006, and after the departure of Kevin Nicholls, was named club captain. His 2006–07 season was disrupted however by a recurrence of his knee injuries that led to further surgery in October 2006.

Luton went into administration during the 2007–08 season and Coyne was sold to Colchester United for a Colchester record transfer fee of £350,000 in January 2008 to obtain necessary funding for the club. Colchester manager Geraint Williams said: "It's great news for the club. Chris is a defender with experience and leadership qualities." However, Coyne was unable to help prevent Colchester from being relegated at the end of the season. Coyne was named Colchester United club captain for the 2008–09 season, but selection for the Australia national team, injuries and a change of management meant that he struggled to hold on to a place in the first team, and at the end of the season, he met with the club management to resolve his future. He left the club by mutual consent in July 2009, saying, "Unfortunately, after 18 months here, it's time to move on. It was made clear that I wasn't going to play week in, week out and I felt that I had to look at that and address it. Also, there isn't much of a chance for the Australian manager to watch League One football but in Australia, I'm guaranteed to play 27 games in front of him." Coyne scored once for the club, his goal coming in a 4–3 defeat against West Bromwich Albion on 29 March 2008.

Coyne returned to Australia to join A-League club Perth Glory on a three-year contract. On 5 March 2010 it was announced that Coyne had signed on loan to Chinese Super League club Liaoning Hongyun as a means to improve his chances of being selected for Australia during the 2010 World Cup. He made his Chinese Super League debut in a 2–1 win over Shaanxi Chanba on 4 April.

== International career ==
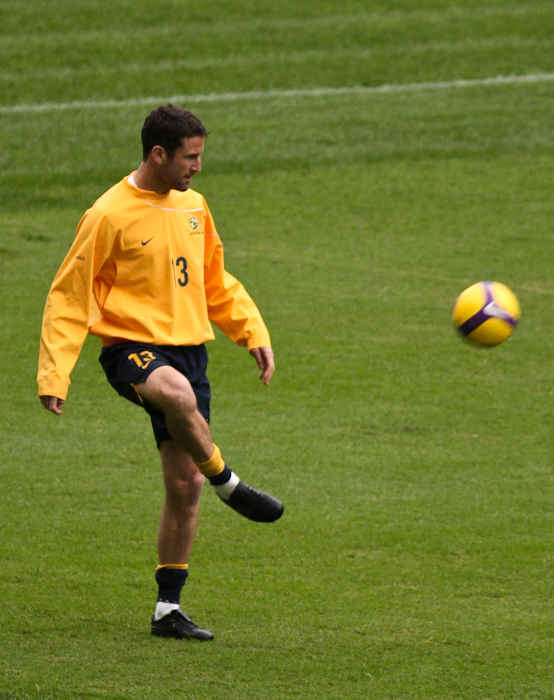
Chris Coyne training before a match.

Coyne was brought into the Australian squad for the World Cup 2010 qualifiers against Iraq and Qatar in June 2008. He impressed in training with Australia manager Pim Verbeek saying: "Chris is a leader, a tough defender. I think he can play at a higher level, but we shall see. I think it’s better to play a little bit more organised in the backline, and then we can use a player like Chris." He made his debut for Australia in the 0–1 defeat to Iraq in Dubai, impressing with the way he marshalled the defence, leading Verbeek to praise him again, saying, "He's an experienced player, he knows what he's doing and he's made a good impression on us. He's a leader. He's a very good header, he's never in panic."

Coyne next played in the friendly games against South Africa in August 2008, and against The Netherlands in September 2008. He followed these with a strong performance against Uzbekistan in Australia's 1–0 victory in their opening final stage pool game for the 2010 World Cup in September 2008. His fifth appearance for the Australia national team came in the 1–0 win against Bahrain in November 2008. His next appearances were in June 2009 as Australia drew with Qatar to secure their place in the 2010 World Cup finals in South Africa, and followed that up a few days later with a 2–0 win over Bahrain. He and teammate Harry Kewell were rested for the final World Cup qualifying match against Japan a week later.

== Managerial career ==
In 2013 Coyne took on the head coach role at Bayswater City SC in the WA Premier League.

In 2014, he was rewarded with coaching duties for the WA State Team, for the Call To Arms Cup match against Perth Glory, where the State Team scored a rare win In 2016, he again coached the State Team, along with assistant coach Steven McGarry.

On 14 October 2020, he was appointed to the Perth Glory FC Academy Under-20s Head Coach role, working under then coach Richard Garcia and transitioning to a new role of secondary Assistant Manager under Glory's then interim Head Coach, Ruben Zadkovich, in 21 March 2022, who was later signed full-time to the position, with Coyne retaining his role.

== Career statistics ==
=== Club ===
Appearances and goals by club, season and competition
Club	Season	League			National Cup		League Cup		Other		Total	
Club	Season	Division	Apps	Goals	Apps	Goals	Apps	Goals	Apps	Goals	Apps	Goals
West Ham United	1998–99	Premier League	1	0	0	0	0	0	0	0	1	0
West Ham United	1999–2000	Premier League	0	0	0	0	0	0	0	0	0	0
West Ham United	Total		1	0	0	0	0	0	0	0	1	0
Brentford (loan)	1998–99	Third Division	7	0	0	0	1	0	0	0	8	0
Southend United (loan)	1998–99	Third Division	1	0	0	0	0	0	0	0	1	0
Dundee	2000–01	Scottish Premier League	18	0	4	0	2	0	0	0	24	0
Dundee	2001–02	Scottish Premier League	2	0	0	0	0	0	2	0	4	0
Dundee	Total		20	0	4	0	2	0	2	0	28	0
Luton Town	2001–02	Third Division	31	3	0	0	0	0	0	0	31	3
Luton Town	2002–03	Second Division	40	1	2	0	1	0	1	0	44	1
Luton Town	2003–04	Second Division	44	2	5	0	2	1	2	0	53	3
Luton Town	2004–05	League One	40	5	3	0	1	0	0	0	44	5
Luton Town	2005–06	Championship	30	2	1	0	2	0	1	0	34	2
Luton Town	2006–07	Championship	18	1	3	0	1	0	0	0	22	1
Luton Town	2007–08	League One	18	0	4	1	3	0	0	0	25	1
Luton Town	Total		221	14	18	1	10	1	4	0	253	16
Colchester United	2007–08	Championship	16	1	0	0	0	0	0	0	16	1
Colchester United	2008–09	League One	19	1	0	0	1	0	2	0	22	1
Colchester United	Total		35	2	0	0	1	0	2	0	38	2
Career total			285	16	22	1	14	1	8	0	329	18

=== International appearances ===
(to 21 June 2009)

Date	Competition	Opponent	Result (Australia score first)	Venue	Match report
7 June 2008	2010 FIFA World Cup	Iraq	0–1	Dubai	
19 August 2008	Friendly	South Africa	2–2	London	
6 September 2008	Friendly	The Netherlands	2–1	Eindhoven	
10 September 2008	2010 FIFA World Cup	Uzbekistan	1–0	Tashkent	
19 November 2008	2010 FIFA World Cup	Bahrain	1–0	Manama	
6 June 2009	2010 FIFA World Cup	Qatar	0–0	Doha	
10 June 2009	2010 FIFA World Cup	Bahrain	2–0	Sydney	

== Honours ==
Luton Town

- Football League One: 2004–05

Australia under-17

- OFC U-17 Championship: 1995

Individual

- PFA Team of the Year: 2004–05 Football League
- Football League One Player of the Month: April 2005
