= Kofi Nyamah =

English footballer (born 1975)

Personal information
- Date of birth: 20 June 1975 (age 51)
- Place of birth: Islington, England
- Position: Winger

Youth career
- Cambridge United

Senior career*
Years	Team	Apps	(Gls)
1993–1995	Cambridge United	23	(2)
1995–1996	Kettering Town		
1996–1998	Stoke City	17	(0)
1998–1999	Luton Town	0	(0)
1999	→ Kingstonian (loan)		
1999–2000	Exeter City	35	(1)
2000	Stevenage Borough	9	(0)
2000	Billericay Town	?	(?)
2000–2001	Kingstonian	0	(0)
2001	Hayes	7	(0)
2002	Boreham Wood	2	(0)
2007–2008	Enfield Town	19	(0)
Total		105	(3)
- * Club domestic league appearances and goals

Kofi Nyamah (born 20 June 1975) is an English former professional footballer who played as a winger. He was born in Islington.

== Career ==
After graduating from the Cambridge United youth team, Nyamah spent two seasons with the first team, scoring two goals in 23 appearances in the Football League between 1993 and 1995. Nyamah later played non-league football with Kettering Town, before returning to League football in 1996 with Stoke City, where he made 17 league appearances. After a gameless spell with Luton Town, Nyamah spent another spell in non-league football with Kingstonian, before he once again returned to League football with Exeter City, where he scored one goal in 35 league appearances. Nyamah then returned to play non-league football with Billericay Town, Stevenage Borough and Hayes.

Nyamah later made two league appearances for Boreham Wood.

Nyamah made 19 league appearances for Enfield Town during the 2007–08 season.

== Career statistics ==
Appearances and goals by club, season and competition
Club	Season	League			FA Cup		League Cup		Other^{[A]}		Total	
Club	Season	Division	Apps	Goals	Apps	Goals	Apps	Goals	Apps	Goals	Apps	Goals
Cambridge United	1993–94	Second Division	14	2	3	1	2	0	3	0	22	3
Cambridge United	1994–95	Second Division	9	0	1	0	0	0	1	0	11	0
Cambridge United	Total		23	2	4	1	2	0	4	0	33	3
Stoke City	1996–97	First Division	7	0	0	0	0	0	0	0	7	0
Stoke City	1997–98	First Division	10	0	0	0	2	0	0	0	12	0
Stoke City	Total		17	0	0	0	2	0	0	0	19	0
Luton Town	1998–99	Second Division	0	0	1	0	1	0	0	0	2	0
Exeter City	1999–2000	Third Division	35	1	1	0	1	0	4	0	40	1
Stevenage Borough	2000–01	Football Conference	9	0	0	0	0	0	1	0	10	0
Kingstonian	2000–01	Football Conference	0	0	1	0	0	0	0	0	1	0
Hayes	2000–01	Football Conference	7	0	0	0	0	0	0	0	7	0
Career Total			91	3	7	1	6	0	9	0	112	4

A. The "Other" column constitutes appearances and goals in the Football League Trophy.
