= Dean Crowe =

English footballer

Personal information
- Full name: Dean Anthony Crowe
- Date of birth: 6 June 1979 (age 47)
- Place of birth: Stockport, England
- Height: 1.65 m (5 ft 5 in)
- Position: Striker

Youth career
- 1993–1995: Stoke City

Senior career*
Years	Team	Apps	(Gls)
1996–2001	Stoke City	60	(12)
2000	→ Northampton Town (loan)	5	(0)
2000	→ Bury (loan)	11	(2)
2001	→ Plymouth Argyle (loan)	1	(0)
2001	→ Luton Town (loan)	6	(5)
2001–2004	Luton Town	63	(12)
2003	→ York City (loan)	5	(0)
2004	Oldham Athletic	5	(1)
2004	Leek Town		
2005–2006	Stockport County	6	(0)
2006–2007	Witton Albion		
2009–2011	Leek Town		
2011–2012	New Mills		
Total		162	(32)
- * Club domestic league appearances and goals

Dean Anthony Crowe (born 6 June 1979) is an English former footballer.

== Career ==
Crowe shot to prominence at Stoke City as a youngster with his goalscoring exploits, when handed a place in the team. However, Crowe fell out of favour and departed on loan to several clubs before being released by Stoke in 2001.

Crowe signed for Luton Town, after a successful loan spell prior to his departure from Stoke. Crowe scored 12 goals in 43 starts for Luton, however a broken leg halted his progress in March 2003. He could not hold down a regular starting place and joined York City on loan in 2003. He signed for Oldham Athletic in early 2004, but only made 5 appearances at the club before leaving.

He had a brief trial at Stafford Rangers before joining Leek Town in September 2004. He then returned to the professional game, when he signed for Stockport County on non-contract terms in August 2005, but only made one start for the club prior to being released in February 2006.

Crowe joined non-league Witton Albion in 2006. He then spent some time out of the game to work on his fitness, before re-signing for Witton ahead of the 2007–08 season. However, his fitness never reached the level required by the Northern Premier League leaders, and he was released in late November, having made little impact on those occasions when he appeared for the club. In December 2009 Crowe joined Leek Town and went on to make his first appearance in the 2–2 draw against Quorn. He later went on to play for New Mills.

== Career statistics ==
Appearances and goals by club, season and competition
Club	Season	League			FA Cup		League Cup		Other		Total	
Club	Season	Division	Apps	Goals	Apps	Goals	Apps	Goals	Apps	Goals	Apps	Goals
Stoke City	1997–98	First Division	16	4	0	0	2	0	—		18	4
Stoke City	1998–99	Second Division	38	8	0	0	1	0	1 (Note: Appearances in Football League Trophy)	1	40	9
Stoke City	1999–2000	Second Division	6	0	0	0	2	0	1	0	9	0
Stoke City	2000–01	Second Division	0	0	0	0	0	0	0	0	0	0
Stoke City	2001–02	Second Division	0	0	0	0	0	0	0	0	0	0
Stoke City	Total		60	12	0	0	5	0	2	1	67	13
Northampton Town (loan)	1999–2000	Third Division	5	0	0	0	0	0	0	0	5	0
Bury (loan)	1999–2000	Second Division	4	1	0	0	0	0	0	0	4	1
Bury (loan)	2000–01	Second Division	7	1	0	0	0	0	0	0	7	1
Bury (loan)	Total		11	2	0	0	0	0	0	0	11	2
Plymouth Argyle (loan)	2001–02	Third Division	1	0	0	0	0	0	0	0	1	0
Luton Town	2001–02	Third Division	34	15	1	0	0	0	0	0	35	15
Luton Town	2002–03	Second Division	27	2	0	0	2	0	1	0	30	2
Luton Town	2003–04	Second Division	8	0	3	0	1	0	2	0	14	0
Luton Town	Total		69	17	4	0	3	0	3	0	79	17
York City (loan)	2003–04	Third Division	5	0	0	0	0	0	0	0	5	0
Oldham Athletic	2003–04	Second Division	5	1	0	0	0	0	0	0	5	1
Stockport County	2005–06	League Two	6	0	0	0	0	0	0	0	6	0
Career total			162	32	4	0	8	0	5	1	179	33

== Honours ==
Luton Town

- Football League Third Division runner-up: 2001–02
