= Paul Stewart (footballer, born 1964) =

English footballer

Personal information
- Full name: Paul Andrew Stewart
- Date of birth: 7 October 1964 (age 62)
- Place of birth: Manchester, England
- Height: 5 ft 11 in (1.80 m)
- Positions: Defensive midfielder; forward

Senior career*
Years	Team	Apps	(Gls)
1981–1987	Blackpool	201	(56)
1987–1988	Manchester City	51	(26)
1988–1992	Tottenham Hotspur	131	(28)
1992–1996	Liverpool	32	(1)
1994	→ Crystal Palace (loan)	18	(3)
1994	→ Wolverhampton Wanderers (loan)	8	(2)
1995	→ Burnley (loan)	6	(0)
1995	→ Sunderland (loan)	2	(0)
1996–1997	Sunderland	34	(5)
1997–1998	Stoke City	22	(3)
1998–2000	Workington	55	(15)
Total		560	(139)

International career
1982	England Youth	1	(0)
1988	England U21	1	(1)
1989–1992	England B	5	(1)
1991–1992	England	3	(0)
- * Club domestic league appearances and goals

Paul Andrew Stewart (born 7 October 1964) is an English former professional footballer who played as a defensive midfielder and forward.

He notably played top flight football for Manchester City, Tottenham Hotspur, Liverpool and Sunderland, with appearances in the Premier League with The Reds and the Black Cats. Whilst with Spurs he scored their first goal in the 1991 FA Cup final and was awarded man of the match as his team lifted the trophy. He also played in the Football League at Blackpool, Crystal Palace, Wolverhampton Wanderers, Burnley and Stoke City. He retired in 2000 following a two-year spell with non-league side Workington. He was capped three times at senior level for England and also played at U21 and B Team level.

== Club career ==
=== Blackpool ===
Stewart started his career as an apprentice with Blackpool, turning professional in October 1981. He made his debut for the Seasiders in a home draw with Rochdale on 10 February 1982. For the remainder of the season, he alternated between midfield and forward. It wasn't until Sam Ellis became manager that Stewart found his true role, at centre-forward, helping Blackpool win promotion from the Fourth Division in 1985. In his final season (1986–87) with the Tangerines, he notched-up 21 goals and helped Mark Taylor net 14 goals, although it wasn't enough to mount a Third Division promotion challenge.

=== Manchester City ===
After over 200 first team appearances, he joined Manchester City in March 1987 for a fee of £200,000, then a welcomed record for hard-up Blackpool, but he was unable to keep City in the First Division. On 7 November 1987 he was one of three players, the others being David White and Tony Adcock to score a hat-trick in a 10–1 victory over Huddersfield Town in the Second Division. Stewart scored a total of 24 goals for City that season, as they reached the quarter-finals of the FA Cup, but were unable to win promotion back to the First Division, and a move from Maine Road was looking inevitable.

=== Tottenham Hotspur ===
Terry Venables signed Stewart for Tottenham Hotspur in June 1988, paying £1.7million (a portion of which went to his first club, Blackpool). At the time it was one of the highest fees paid by an English club, and the highest for a Second Division player.

Stewart made his debut for Spurs on 1 October 1988, as a substitute in a 2–2 draw at home to Manchester United, missing a stoppage time penalty. Bought as a striker and scoring 12 goals in his first league season at White Hart Lane, when his goals dried up, he was successfully converted to a midfield role. This came about during a match with Luton at White Hart Lane in December 1990, with Spurs losing Nayim and Pat van den Hauwe to red cards (and Luton being down to ten men), he dropped back and was the most influential player in the match, scoring both goals in a 2–1 win. He was part of a Tottenham midfield which also included Nayim, Paul Gascoigne and Paul Allen, backing up the strikeforce of Gary Lineker and Paul Walsh.

On 5 January 1991, Stewart returned to Bloomfield Road when Tottenham beat Blackpool 1–0 in the Third Round of the FA Cup. It was the only time Stewart faced his first club. He would go on to score Spurs' first goal in the 1991 FA Cup Final win against Nottingham Forest, and was generally regarded as the Man of the Match.

=== Liverpool ===
After speculation over the summer of 1992 that he would sign for Manchester United or return to Manchester City, Stewart was transferred to Liverpool in July 1992 for £2.3million, but injuries and lack of form plagued his time at Anfield. He became their second striker alongside Ian Rush after Dean Saunders was sold to Aston Villa in September, but managed just one league goal (against Sheffield United on his Anfield debut) from 24 games as Liverpool spent most of the season struggling in the new Premier League before finishing sixth. On a rare positive note at Anfield, he scored twice for the Reds in their European Cup Winners' Cup first round first leg victory over Apollon Limassol on 16 September 1992. A proposed return to Manchester City, who expressed an interest in re-signing him in July 1993, never took place.

He played just eight league games in 1993–94 as new arrival Nigel Clough and then rising star Robbie Fowler took his place alongside Rush, and went out on loan to Crystal Palace, helping them return to the Premier League at the first attempt as Division One champions. He never played for Liverpool after the 1993–94 season, although he remained contracted to the club (and assigned the number 8 squad number for another season until it went to Stan Collymore) until March 1996. Stewart scored just three goals during his spell at Liverpool.

=== Later career ===
He had loan spells at Crystal Palace (January 1994), Wolverhampton Wanderers (September 1994), Burnley (February 1995) and Sunderland (August–November 1995), before joining Sunderland on a free transfer in March 1996 and helped them win promotion to the Premier League as Division One champions. He was unable to keep them in the Premier League and after their relegation he signed for Stoke City. Stewart's spell at Stoke City was not a successful one as he played 25 times in 1997–98 scoring three goals and ended with Stoke suffering relegation to the third tier.

Stewart then signed for non-league side Workington, scoring 15 goals in 55 games over two years, and helping them win promotion from the North West Counties League in his first season, before retiring from playing completely at the end of the 1999–00 season with Workington re-established in the Northern Premier League First Division. Stewart remains one of the very few players to have the distinction of playing in a north London derby, a Manchester derby, a Merseyside derby and a Northeast derby.

== International career ==
Stewart played for England at England under-21 and B before being capped three times in the early 1990s for the senior side under Graham Taylor.

== Personal life ==
Stewart was inducted into the Hall of Fame at Bloomfield Road, when it was officially opened by former Blackpool player Jimmy Armfield in April 2006. Organised by the Blackpool Supporters Association, Blackpool fans around the world voted on their all-time heroes. Five players from each decade are inducted; Stewart is in the 1980s.

In November 2016, Stewart said that he was a victim of child sexual abuse when he was playing youth football.

Stewart released his autobiography in August 2017, titled, Damaged.

At the 2024 EFL Awards, Stewart received the Contribution to League Football award.

== Career statistics ==
Appearances and goals by club, season and competition
Club	Season	League			FA Cup		League Cup		Other^{[A]}		Total	
Club	Season	Division	Apps	Goals	Apps	Goals	Apps	Goals	Apps	Goals	Apps	Goals
Blackpool	1981–82	Fourth Division	14	3	0	0	0	0	0	0	14	3
Blackpool	1982–83	Fourth Division	38	7	0	0	4	1	0	0	42	8
Blackpool	1983–84	Fourth Division	44	10	4	1	1	1	0	0	49	12
Blackpool	1984–85	Fourth Division	31	6	0	0	2	1	2	0	35	7
Blackpool	1985–86	Third Division	42	8	2	1	1	0	2	0	47	9
Blackpool	1986–87	Third Division	32	22	1	0	2	0	2	1	37	23
Blackpool	Total		201	56	7	2	10	3	6	1	224	62
Manchester City	1986–87	First Division	11	2	0	0	0	0	0	0	11	2
Manchester City	1987–88	Second Division	40	24	6	1	4	2	2	1	52	28
Manchester City	Total		51	26	6	1	4	2	2	1	63	30
Tottenham Hotspur	1988–89	First Division	30	12	1	0	4	1	0	0	35	13
Tottenham Hotspur	1989–90	First Division	28	8	1	0	6	1	0	0	35	9
Tottenham Hotspur	1990–91	First Division	35	3	5	2	6	4	0	0	46	9
Tottenham Hotspur	1991–92	First Division	38	5	2	0	7	1	9	0	56	6
Tottenham Hotspur	Total		131	28	9	2	23	7	9	0	172	37
Liverpool	1992–93	Premier League	24	1	1	0	3	0	3	2	31	3
Liverpool	1993–94	Premier League	8	0	0	0	3	0	0	0	11	0
Liverpool	1994–95	Premier League	0	0	0	0	0	0	0	0	0	0
Liverpool	Total		32	1	1	0	6	0	3	2	42	3
Crystal Palace (loan)	1993–94	First Division	18	3	0	0	0	0	0	0	18	3
Wolverhampton Wanderers (loan)	1994–95	First Division	8	2	0	0	0	0	2	0	10	2
Burnley (loan)	1994–95	First Division	6	0	0	0	0	0	0	0	6	0
Sunderland	1995–96	First Division	12	1	0	0	0	0	0	0	12	1
Sunderland	1996–97	Premier League	24	4	1	0	3	0	0	0	28	4
Sunderland	Total		36	5	1	0	3	0	0	0	40	5
Stoke City	1997–98	First Division	22	3	1	0	2	0	0	0	25	3
Career Total			505	124	25	5	48	12	22	4	600	145

A. The "Other" column constitutes appearances and goals in the Anglo-Italian Cup, Football League Trophy, Full Members Cup and UEFA Cup Winners' Cup.

== Honours ==
Tottenham Hotspur

- FA Cup: 1990–91

Crystal Palace

- Football League First Division: 1993–94

Sunderland

- Football League First Division: 1995–96

Workington

- North West Counties League First Division: 1998–99

Individual

- PFA Team of the Year: 1987–88 Second Division
- Blackpool Hall of Fame Inductee
