= Paul Macari =

English footballer (born 1976)

Personal information
- Date of birth: 23 August 1976 (age 50)
- Place of birth: Manchester, England
- Position: Forward

Youth career
- 1992–1993: Stoke City

Senior career*
Years	Team	Apps	(Gls)
1993–1998	Stoke City	3	(0)
1999–2001	Sheffield United	0	(0)
2001–2003	Huddersfield Town	11	(0)
2003	Leek Town		
2005	Alsager Town		
2010	Leek Town		
- * Club domestic league appearances and goals

Paul Macari (born 23 August 1976) is an English former professional footballer who played as a forward. The son of former Scotland international Lou Macari, he played professionally for Stoke City and Huddersfield Town. His brother Mike Macari was also a professional footballer.

== Career ==
Macari joined Stoke City as a trainee in August 1993 and made his debut as a substitute in a 1–1 away draw against Charlton in a Division One match in October 1997. He made two further substitute appearances for Stoke in the 1997–98 season before joining Sheffield United on a free transfer in 1999. He was released by Sheffield United in August 2001, having made no appearances for the first-team, and joined Huddersfield Town, where he went on to make 14 league and cup appearances, all as substitute, in the 2001–02 and 2002–03 seasons.

Macari left Huddersfield Town on a free transfer in December 2003 and joined Northern Premier League First Division club Leek Town, where he was appointed player-coach in March 2004. Finding his playing opportunities limited, he relinquished his position as coach in August 2004 to concentrate on the playing side and joined North West Counties League club Alsager Town.

Macari rejoined Leek Town in an assistant manager/player role in 2010 but left at the end of the year following the sacking of Wayne Johnson.

== Post-retirement ==
After leaving the game, Macari took up co-ownership of the Hanley branch of Domino's Pizza; in March 2012, he provided the Port Vale squad with free pizzas after the club hit financial difficulties.

His son Lewis is also a footballer, who was involved in Stoke City's development squads and the Scotland under-18 team as of 2020.

== Career statistics ==
Appearances and goals by club, season and competition
Club	Season	League			FA Cup		League Cup		Other (Note: Includes Football League Trophy.)		Total	
Club	Season	Division	Apps	Goals	Apps	Goals	Apps	Goals	Apps	Goals	Apps	Goals
Stoke City	1997–98	First Division	3	0	0	0	0	0	0	0	3	0
Sheffield United	1998–99	First Division	0	0	0	0	0	0	0	0	0	0
Huddersfield Town	2001–02	Second Division	6	0	0	0	1	0	2	0	9	0
Huddersfield Town	2002–03	Second Division	5	0	0	0	1	0	0	0	6	0
Career total			14	0	0	0	2	0	2	0	18	0
