= Stuart Fraser (footballer, born 1978) =

English footballer (born 1978)

Personal information
- Full name: Stuart James Fraser
- Date of birth: 1 August 1978 (age 48)
- Place of birth: Cheltenham, England
- Position: Goalkeeper

Senior career*
Years	Team	Apps	(Gls)
1996–1997	Cheltenham Town	0	(0)
1997–2000	Stoke City	1	(0)
2000–2003	Exeter City	19	(0)
2003–2004	Tiverton Town	33	(0)
–	Bath City		
- * Club domestic league appearances and goals

Stuart Fraser (born 1 August 1978) is a former footballer who played in the Football League for Exeter City and Stoke City.

== Career ==
Fraser came through the youth ranks at his home town club Cheltenham Town before earning a move to Stoke for £100,000. However he only made one league appearance, which came against Walsall in the final game of the 1998–99 season when Fraser came on as a substitute for Carl Muggleton for the final 10 minutes. After a number of knee injuries he moved to Exeter City where he made a number of first team appearances but still struggled with knee problems. He has since played for Tiverton Town and Bath City and is now a sports coach in a primary school and goalkeeping coach for Exeter city centre of excellence.

== Career statistics ==
Club	Season	League			FA Cup		League Cup		League Trophy		Total	
Club	Season	Division	Apps	Goals	Apps	Goals	Apps	Goals	Apps	Goals	Apps	Goals
Stoke City	1998–99	Second Division	1	0	0	0	0	0	0	0	1	0
Stoke City	1999–2000	Second Division	0	0	0	0	0	0	0	0	0	0
Exeter City	2000–01	Third Division	6	0	0	0	1	0	1	0	8	0
Exeter City	2001–02	Third Division	12	0	0	0	0	0	0	0	12	0
Exeter City	2002–03	Third Division	1	0	1	0	0	0	0	0	2	0
Career Total			20	0	1	0	1	0	1	0	23	0
