= 1998–99 Stoke City F.C. season =

Stoke City
1998–99 season
- Chairman: Keith Humphreys
- Manager: Brian Little
- Stadium: Britannia Stadium
- Football League Second Division: 8th (69 Points)
- FA Cup: Second Round
- League Cup: First Round
- League Trophy: Second Round
- Top goalscorer: League: Graham Kavanagh (11); All: Graham Kavanagh (13)
- Highest home attendance: 23,272 vs Preston North End (26 December 1998)
- Lowest home attendance: 6,569 vs Wycombe Wanderers (14 March 1999)
- Average home league attendance: 12,732
Home colours

The 1998–99 season was Stoke City's 92nd season in the Football League and the fifth in the third tier.

Stoke entered a new era at their 28,000 seater stadium in the third tier of English football with heavy debts of around £5 million and had no manager the future seemed very uncertain. It came as a welcome surprise then when chairman Keith Humphreys appointed former Aston Villa manager Brian Little. And Little's new look side started the season on fire winning six straight matches as it looked like that Stoke would be too good for their Second Division opponents. By November it seemed a matter of when and not if Stoke would gain promotion but their form completely dropped off and just one win was registered from the end of November to March. Chief executive Jez Moxey was now coming in for some serious pressure to resign by the supporters due to the poor finances and with no chance of promotion Stoke finished in 8th place with 69 points. Little had since lost interest way before the end of the season and he resigned in July leaving Stoke to find another manager.

== Season review ==
=== League ===
Chief executive Jez Moxey predicted that Stoke would lose around £1 million a year through being in the Second Division, such was the price Stoke had to pay after poor financial mismanagement on moving to the Britannia Stadium. In an attempt to retain fan interest, season ticket prices were frozen and chairman Keith Humphreys apologised for the past nine months of "bloody awful football" and he also appealed to the supporter group S.O.S (Save Our Stoke) to lift their ban on season tickets and merchandise. SOS wanted to starve out the current board and force them to sell in order to breathe fresh life back into the club. It came as a welcome surprise then when chairman Keith Humphreys appointed former Aston Villa manager Brian Little. Accepting that there was hardly any money available, Little signed players from the lower leagues such as Bryan Small, Phil Robinson and David Oldfield.

Little's new look side started the 1998–99 season with a bang, winning their first six matches which included a 4–3 win at Preston North End and saw Stoke installed by the bookies as promotion favourites. However a remainder that the club still had incompetent people working there when Jez Moxey revealed that they had budgeted for three rounds in the League Cup, Stoke lost to Macclesfield Town in the first round and therefore lost some £125,000. On the pitch Stoke's run came to an end at Fulham and new signing Chris Short had breathing problems and had to be carried off, which would disrupt the balance of the team and his condition would eventually end his career. Up front the goals dried up with Kyle Lightbourne out injured and Simon Sturridge retiring the injuries slowed Stoke's progress and David Oldfield was having a poor time and became a target for the fans.

It was becoming frustrating for Stoke as promotion rivals Fulham spent £2 million on Barry Hayles whose goals would win them the title, and Stoke on the other hand had to rely on free transfers and loans as well as academy players. Stoke won one game between Christmas and the beginning of March, dropping out of the play-off places. Little was very unimpressed and after a 2–0 defeat at Millwall, who won despite having nine men for most of the match said: "That was the worst result in my twelve years in management". More protests by the supporters followed against Moxey and the directors as Stoke's slim hopes of making the play-offs ended with a humiliating 4–1 defeat at home to Bristol Rovers and Stoke finished the season in 8th place. Brian Little resigned in July 1999 saying: "I have tried my best and the disappointment is very hard to take. I hope the supporters understand that it's best that I leave". He soon joined West Bromwich Albion meaning that Stoke would at least get some compensation.

=== FA Cup ===
Stoke won their first FA Cup away tie in 26 years against league rivals Reading alas normal service was resumed in the next match a defeat at Swansea City.

=== League Cup ===
Stoke met nearby Macclesfield Town in the first round and came away embarrassed as the "Silkmen" won 3–2 on aggregate.

=== League Trophy ===
After beating Blackpool Stoke lost 2–1 at home to Rochdale.

== Final league table ==
Pos	Team	Pld	W	D	L	GF	GA	GD	Pts	Qualification or relegation
6	Wigan Athletic	46	22	10	14	75	48	+27	76	Qualification for the Second Division play-offs
7	Bournemouth	46	21	13	12	63	41	+22	76	
8	Stoke City	46	21	6	19	59	63	−4	69	
9	Chesterfield	46	17	13	16	46	44	+2	64	
10	Millwall	46	17	11	18	52	59	−7	62	

Rules for classification: 1) Points; 2) Goals scored; 3) Goal difference

== Results ==
Stoke's score comes first

=== Legend ===
Win	Draw	Loss

=== Football League Second Division ===
Match	Date	Opponent	Venue	Result	Attendance	Scorers
1	8 August 1998	Northampton Town	A	3–1	6,661	Kavanagh (pen) 7', Thorne 63', Crowe 83'
2	15 August 1998	Macclesfield Town	H	2–0	13,981	Crowe 25', Thorne 36'
3	22 August 1998	Preston North End	A	4–3	11,587	Crowe (2) 50', 85', Kavanagh (2) 69', 72' (pen)
4	29 August 1998	Oldham Athletic	H	2–0	12,306	Keen 22', Lightbourne 90'
5	31 August 1998	Colchester United	A	1–0	4,728	Kavanagh 78'
6	5 September 1998	Bournemouth	H	2–0	13,443	Thorne 70', Crowe 76'
7	8 September 1998	Fulham	A	0–1	12,055	
8	12 September 1998	Millwall	H	1–0	12,307	Lightbourne 90'
9	19 September 1998	Wrexham	A	1–0	7,290	Wallace 78'
10	26 September 1998	Blackpool	H	1–3	15,002	Crowe 69' (pen)
11	3 October 1998	Reading	A	1–2	13,089	Whittle 69'
12	12 October 1998	Chesterfield	H	0–0	10,557	
13	17 October 1998	Lincoln City	A	2–1	6,159	Robinson 59', Sigurðsson 52'
14	20 October 1998	Bristol Rovers	A	0–1	6,752	
15	24 October 1998	Wigan Athletic	H	2–1	11,480	Kavanagh 52', Griffiths 53' (o.g.)
16	31 October 1998	Notts County	A	0–1	8,546	
17	7 November 1998	Luton Town	H	3–1	12,964	Oldfield 3', Forsyth 37', Lightbourne 90'
18	10 November 1998	Burnley	A	2–0	10,575	Lightbourne 47', Thorne 62'
19	21 November 1998	York City	H	2–0	11,795	Forsyth 30', Oldfield 35'
20	28 November 1998	Wycombe Wanderers	A	1–0	6,023	Kavanagh 79'
21	12 December 1998	Gillingham	H	0–0	17,233	
22	19 December 1998	Walsall	A	0–1	9,056	
23	26 December 1998	Preston North End	H	0–1	23,272	
24	28 December 1998	Manchester City	A	1–2	30,478	Sigurðsson 31'
25	9 January 1999	Northampton Town	H	3–1	11,180	Wallace 56', Thorne 74', Lightbourne 84'
26	23 January 1999	Colchester United	H	3–3	12,507	Gregory 30' (o.g.), Lightbourne 34', Sigurðsson 42'
27	29 January 1999	Manchester City	H	0–1	13,679	
28	6 February 1999	Bournemouth	A	0–4	7,637	
29	20 February 1999	Millwall	A	0–2	7,855	
30	27 February 1999	Wrexham	H	1–3	10,765	Sigurðsson 82'
31	6 March 1999	Blackpool	A	1–0	5,504	Lightbourne 34'
32	10 March 1999	Reading	H	0–4	8,218	
33	13 March 1999	Luton Town	A	2–1	5,221	Kavanagh (2) 10' (pen), 17'
34	16 March 1999	Fulham	H	0–1	12,298	
35	20 March 1999	Notts County	H	2–3	9,565	Oldfield 68', Keen 90'
36	27 March 1999	Wigan Athletic	A	3–2	4,133	Thorne 54', Kavanagh 80', Strong 88'
37	3 April 1999	Lincoln City	H	2–0	12,845	Thorne 21', 65'
38	5 April 1999	Chesterfield	A	1–1	5,290	Oldfield 32'
39	10 April 1999	Bristol Rovers	H	1–4	17,823	Thorne 41'
40	14 April 1999	Wycombe Wanderers	H	2–2	6,569	Wallace 38, Oldfield 61'
41	17 April 1999	York City	A	2–2	4,142	Kavanagh 10' (pen), 85'
42	24 April 1999	Burnley	H	1–4	10,965	Crowe 31'
43	27 April 1999	Macclesfield Town	A	2–1	3,825	Oldfield 31', Crowe 50'
44	1 May 1999	Gillingham	A	0–4	8,289	
45	4 May 1999	Oldham Athletic	A	0–1	5,015	
46	8 May 1999	Walsall	H	2–0	12,091	Connor (2) 24', 50'

=== FA Cup ===
Round	Date	Opponent	Venue	Result	Attendance	Scorers
R1	14 November 1998	Reading	A	1–0	10,095	Lightbourne 27'
R2	5 December 1998	Swansea City	A	0–1	7,460	

=== League Cup ===
Round	Date	Opponent	Venue	Result	Attendance	Scorers
R1 1st Leg	11 August 1998	Macclesfield Town	A	1–3	2,963	Kavanagh 10'
R1 2nd Leg	19 August 1998	Macclesfield Town	H	1–0	6,152	Thorne 78'

=== League Trophy ===
Round	Date	Opponent	Venue	Result	Attendance	Scorers
R1	8 December 1998	Blackpool	A	2–0	1,759	Kavanagh 10' (pen), Thorne 76'
R2	2 February 1998	Rochdale	H	1–2	7,661	Crowe 88'

== Squad statistics ==
Pos.	Name	League		FA Cup		League Cup		League Trophy		Total		Discipline	
Pos.	Name	Apps	Goals	Apps	Goals	Apps	Goals	Apps	Goals	Apps	Goals	Yellow card	Red card
GK	(England) Stuart Fraser	0(1)	0	0	0	0	0	0	0	0(1)	0	0	0
GK	(England) Carl Muggleton	40	0	2	0	2	0	2	0	46	0	1	0
GK	(England) Gavin Ward	6	0	0	0	0	0	0	0	6	0	0	0
DF	(Republic of Ireland) Clive Clarke	2	0	0	0	0	0	0	0	2	0	0	0
DF	(England) Lee Collins	4	0	0	0	0	0	0	0	4	0	2	0
DF	(England) Jason Kavanagh	8	0	0	0	0	0	0	0	8	0	0	0
DF	(England) Nicky Mohan	15	0	0	0	0	0	0	0	15	0	3	0
DF	(England) Ben Petty	9(2)	0	1	0	0	0	1	0	11(2)	0	2	0
DF	(England) Ally Pickering	0(1)	0	0	0	1	0	0	0	1(1)	0	0	0
DF	(England) Phil Robinson	39(1)	1	2	0	2	0	0	0	43(1)	1	4	1
DF	(England) Chris Short	19(2)	0	0	0	2	0	0	0	21(2)	0	3	0
DF	(Iceland) Lárus Sigurðsson	38	4	2	0	1	0	2	0	43	4	8	0
DF	(England) Bryan Small	35(2)	0	2	0	2	0	2	0	41(2)	0	6	0
DF	(Scotland) Steven Tweed	0(1)	0	0	0	0(1)	0	1	0	1(2)	0	0	0
DF	(England) Ray Wallace	11(20)	3	0(1)	0	0(1)	0	1	0	12(22)	3	1	0
DF	(England) Justin Whittle	9(5)	1	0	0	1	0	0	0	10(5)	1	2	0
DF	(England) Steve Woods	33	0	2	0	2	0	2	0	39	0	4	0
DF	(England) Ashley Wooliscroft	0(1)	0	0	0	0	0	0	0	0(1)	0	0	0
MF	(England) Richard Forsyth	13(5)	2	2	0	0	0	1(1)	0	16(6)	2	0	0
MF	(England) Robert Heath	7(3)	0	0	0	0	0	2	0	9(3)	0	0	0
MF	(Republic of Ireland) Graham Kavanagh	36	11	2	0	2	1	2	1	42	13	10	2
MF	(England) Kevin Keen	43(1)	2	2	0	1	0	1(1)	0	47(2)	2	4	0
MF	(England) Neil MacKenzie	3(3)	0	0	0	0	0	0(1)	0	3(4)	0	0	0
MF	(Republic of Ireland) James O'Connor	4	0	0	0	0	0	0(1)	0	4(1)	0	2	0
MF	(Australia) David Oldfield	43(3)	6	2	0	2	0	1	0	48(3)	6	4	0
MF	(England) Greg Strong	5	1	0	0	0	0	0	0	5	1	1	0
FW	(England) Paul Connor	2(1)	2	0	0	0	0	0	0	2(1)	2	0	0
FW	(England) Dean Crowe	19(19)	8	0	0	1	0	1	1	21(19)	9	0	0
FW	(Bermuda) Kyle Lightbourne	28(8)	7	1	1	0	0	1	0	31(8)	8	5	0
FW	(England) Simon Sturridge	1(2)	0	0(1)	0	0	0	1(1)	0	2(4)	0	0	0
FW	(England) Steven Taaffe	1(2)	0	0	0	0	0	0	0	1(2)	0	0	0
FW	(England) Peter Thorne	33(1)	9	2	0	2	1	1	1	38(1)	11	6	0
–	Own goals	–	2	–	0	–	0	–	0	–	2	–	–
