= Ally Pickering =

English former professional footballer and manager (born 1967)

Personal information
- Date of birth: 22 June 1967 (age 59)
- Place of birth: Manchester, England
- Position: Defender

Youth career
- 1989–1990: Buxton

Senior career*
Years	Team	Apps	(Gls)
1989–1993	Rotherham United	88	(2)
1993–1996	Coventry City	65	(0)
1996–1999	Stoke City	83	(1)
1998–1999	Burnley	21	(1)
1999	Altrincham		
1999	→ Radcliffe Borough (loan)	4	(0)
1999–2000	Chesterfield	0	(0)
2000	→ Chester City (loan)	7	(1)
2000–2001	Hyde United	15	(2)
2001	Gainsborough Trinity		
2001	Mossley	18	(1)
2001	Hyde United	2	(0)
2001–2003	Mossley		

Managerial career
- 2001–2003: Mossley
- 2005–2007: Woodley Sports
- 2008: Woodley Sports
- 2010–2012: New Mills
- * Club domestic league appearances and goals

Albert Gary Pickering (born 22 June 1967) is an English football manager and former professional footballer.

As a player, he played as a defender from 1989 until 2003 notably in the Premier League for Coventry City. He has also played in the Football League for Rotherham United, Stoke City, Burnley, Chesterfield and Chester City, as well as spells in Non-League football for Altrincham, Hyde United, Gainsborough Trinity and Mossley.

In 2001 he took charge of Mossley in a player/manager role and then went on to have spells in charge of Woodley Sports and New Mills before joining Hyde as their reserve team manager.

== Playing career ==
Pickering was born in Manchester and began his career with non-league Buxton before becoming a professional with Rotherham United. He spent five seasons at Millmoor making 111 appearances scoring twice helping the side gain promotion in 1991–92. He earned a move to Premier League side Coventry City in October 1993 and was a regular for two seasons at Highfield Road making 75 appearances. He joined Stoke City in August 1996 and became the regular right back for the Potters making 45 appearances in 1996–97. In 1997–98 he was an ever-present playing in all of the club's 48 fixtures as Stoke suffered relegation. Pickering did score his only goal for Stoke in a 2–1 victory over Portsmouth on 11 April 1998. New Stoke manager Brian Little deemed him to surplus to requirements at the start of the 1998–99 campaign and he joined Burnley.

After a season at Turf Moor Pickering went on to play for Altrincham, Chesterfield and made seven appearances for Chester City. He then dropped into non-league football with Hyde United, Gainsborough Trinity and Mossley.

== Managerial career ==
From November 2001 to July 2003 Pickering was the manager of Mossley. A month after leaving he became assistant manager of Woodley Sports, becoming their manager in 2005. He left in February 2007.

He began a second spell as manager of Woodley Sports in May 2008 but left for a second time in December 2008. On 24 March 2010, Pickering took over as manager at New Mills, initially as caretaker until the end of the season.

Pickering remained at New Mills until October 2012, when he and the club parted company by mutual consent.

In September 2013, Pickering joined Hyde as their reserve team manager.

== Career statistics ==
Club	Season	League			FA Cup		League Cup		Other^{[A]}		Total	
Club	Season	Division	Apps	Goals	Apps	Goals	Apps	Goals	Apps	Goals	Apps	Goals
Rotherham United	1989–90	Third Division	10	0	0	0	0	0	0	0	10	0
Rotherham United	1990–91	Third Division	1	0	1	0	1	0	1	0	4	0
Rotherham United	1991–92	Fourth Division	27	0	3	0	1	0	2	0	33	0
Rotherham United	1992–93	Second Division	38	1	5	0	2	0	3	0	48	1
Rotherham United	1993–94	Second Division	12	1	0	0	3	0	1	0	16	1
Rotherham United	Total		88	2	9	0	7	0	7	0	111	2
Coventry City	1993–94	Premier League	4	0	0	0	0	0	0	0	4	0
Coventry City	1994–95	Premier League	31	0	2	0	3	0	0	0	36	0
Coventry City	1995–96	Premier League	30	0	2	1	3	0	0	0	35	1
Coventry City	Total		65	0	4	1	6	0	0	0	75	1
Stoke City	1996–97	First Division	40	0	1	0	4	0	0	0	45	0
Stoke City	1997–98	First Division	42	1	1	0	5	0	0	0	48	1
Stoke City	1998–99	Second Division	1	0	0	0	1	0	0	0	2	0
Stoke City	Total		83	1	2	0	10	0	0	0	95	1
Burnley	1998–99	Second Division	21	1	0	0	0	0	0	0	21	1
Chester City	1998–99	Third Division	7	1	0	0	0	0	0	0	7	1
Career Total			264	5	15	1	23	0	7	0	309	6

A. The "Other" column constitutes appearances and goals in the Football League Trophy.
