= José Andrade (footballer, born 1970) =

Cape Verdean footballer

Personal information
- Full name: José Manuel Gomes de Andrade
- Date of birth: 1 June 1970 (age 56)
- Place of birth: São Vicente, Cape Verde
- Height: 1.78 m (5 ft 10 in)
- Position: Striker

Senior career*
Years	Team	Apps	(Gls)
1991–1992	Académica Coimbra	15	(1)
1992–1997	Académico Viseu	136	(54)
1995	→ Stoke City (loan)	4	(1)
1997–1998	Stoke City	12	(1)
1998	Gil Vicente	9	(1)
1998–1999	Maia	12	(0)
1999–2002	Atlético Aviação		
2002–2005	Spora Luxembourg	52	(53)
2005–2008	Avenir Beggen	40	(20)
2008–2010	Jeunesse Schieren	7	(7)

International career
2003	Cape Verde	2	(0)
- * Club domestic league appearances and goals

José Manuel Gomes de Andrade (born 1 June 1970), also known as Zé de Angola, is a Cape Verdean retired professional footballer who played as a striker. He also held Portuguese nationality, due to the many years he spent in the country.

== Football career ==
Born in São Vicente, Cape Verde, Andrade spent most of his early career in the second and third divisions of Portuguese football, never appearing in the top level and mainly representing Académico de Viseu FC. Also in the 90s, he had two spells in England with Stoke City, one on loan, making a total of 16 league appearances for the Potters.

A player of slight build, Andrade broke his leg during a second division game at Swindon Town in April 1995, and returned to Portugal during the summer to regain fitness. He returned to Stoke two years later but, although he was a big hit with the supporters, he failed to settle in England and was released after five months.

After two unassuming years in the Portuguese second level, with only 21 games combined for F.C. Maia and Gil Vicente FC, Andrade – known as Zé de Angola (Angola's Zé – short for Joseph) during his spell in the country – spent four seasons in Angola with Atlético Sport Aviação. He would retire at the age of 40, after eight years with three clubs in Luxembourg.

== Personal life ==
Andrade's son Bruno, also became a professional footballer.

== Career statistics ==
=== Club ===
Club	Season	League			FA Cup		League Cup		Total	
Club	Season	Division	Apps	Goals	Apps	Goals	Apps	Goals	Apps	Goals
Académica Coimbra	1991–92	Segunda Divisão de Honra	15	1	—		—		15	1
Académico Viseu	1992–93	Segunda Divisão B	31	19	—		—		31	19
Académico Viseu	1993–94	Segunda Divisão de Honra	32	6	—		—		32	6
Académico Viseu	1994–95	Segunda Divisão B	23	15	—		—		23	15
Académico Viseu	1995–96	Segunda Divisão de Honra	25	9	—		—		25	9
Académico Viseu	1996–97	Segunda Divisão de Honra	25	5	—		—		25	5
Académico Viseu	Total		136	54	—		—		136	54
Stoke City (loan)	1994–95	First Division	4	1	0	0	0	0	4	1
Stoke City	1997–98	First Division	12	1	0	0	2	0	14	1
Stoke City	Total		16	2	0	0	2	0	18	2
Gil Vicente	1997–98	Segunda Divisão de Honra	9	1	—		—		9	1
Maia	1998–99	Segunda Divisão de Honra	12	0	—		—		12	0
Spora Luxembourg	2002–03	Luxembourg Division of Honour	19	21	—		—		19	21
Spora Luxembourg	2003–04	Luxembourg National Division	23	24	—		—		23	24
Spora Luxembourg	2004–05	Luxembourg National Division	10	8	—		—		10	8
Spora Luxembourg	Total		52	53	—		—		52	53
Avenir Beggen	2005–06	Luxembourg National Division	0	0	—		—		0	0
Avenir Beggen	2006–07	Luxembourg Division of Honour	21	14	—		—		21	14
Avenir Beggen	2007–08	Luxembourg National Division	19	6	—		—		19	6
Avenir Beggen	Total		40	20	—		—		40	20
Jeunesse Schieren	2009–10	Luxembourg Division of Honour	7	7	—		—		7	7
Career Total			272	137	0	0	2	0	274	137

=== International ===
National team	Year	Apps	Goals
Cape Verde	2003	2	0
Total		2	0
