= Richard Forsyth =

English footballer (born 1970)

Personal information
- Full name: Richard Michael Forsyth
- Date of birth: 3 October 1970 (age 56)
- Place of birth: Dudley, England
- Height: 5 ft 10 in (1.78 m)
- Position: Midfielder

Senior career*
Years	Team	Apps	(Gls)
198?–1987	Stourbridge		
1987–1995	Kidderminster Harriers	303	(71)
1995–1996	Birmingham City	26	(2)
1996–1999	Stoke City	95	(17)
1999–2000	Blackpool	13	(0)
2000–2002	Peterborough United	70	(2)
2002	→ Cheltenham Town (loan)	5	(1)
2002–2004	Cheltenham Town	34	(3)
2004	Northwich Victoria	3	(0)
2006	Wolverhampton Casuals		
2007	Shawbury United		
- * Club domestic league appearances and goals

Richard Michael Forsyth (born 3 October 1970) is an English former professional footballer who played as a midfielder. He made nearly 250 appearances in the Football League playing for Birmingham City, Stoke City, Blackpool, Peterborough United and Cheltenham Town.

== Playing career ==
Forsyth was born in Dudley, Staffordshire (now West Midlands). He began his football career with Stourbridge before joining Kidderminster Harriers in 1987. In eight years with the club he played more than 300 games in all competitions, scoring 71 goals. He was part of the team which won the Conference title in 1993–94, and was the club's leading league scorer for the 1994–95 season with 13 goals, before moving to Birmingham City for a fee of £100,000.

A year later he moved on to Stoke City for a £200,000 fee, where he scored the first League goal in Stoke's new Britannia Stadium, went on to spend three seasons with the club playing more than 100 games in all competitions. His next move was to Blackpool on a free transfer in 1999, and then to Peterborough United, also on a free, where he linked up again with former Birmingham manager Barry Fry. In October 2002, amid financial uncertainty at Peterborough, Forsyth joined Cheltenham Town on a month's loan; on his return to Peterborough, the club expected him to remain with them, but, claiming the player had been "unsettled" by Cheltenham's offer of a longer permanent contract, finally allowed him to join Cheltenham for a fee of £15,000. In January 2003 he sustained a hamstring injury which put paid to the remainder of his season. Released at the end of the 2003–2004 season, Forsyth joined Northwich Victoria on non-contract terms, but within weeks he suffered cruciate ligament damage which would keep him out for the season.

He has since played for Stoke City's Masters team, and for Wolverhampton Casuals and Shawbury United of the West Midlands (Regional) League Premier Division.

After his career in football, he taught physical education at North East Wolverhampton Academy and Ormiston Forge Academy.

== Career statistics ==
Appearances and goals by club, season and competition
Club	Season	League			FA Cup		League Cup		Other^{[A]}		Total	
Club	Season	Division	Apps	Goals	Apps	Goals	Apps	Goals	Apps	Goals	Apps	Goals
Birmingham City	1995–96	First Division	26	2	2	0	9	0	4	0	41	2
Stoke City	1996–97	First Division	40	8	1	0	3	0	0	0	44	8
Stoke City	1997–98	First Division	37	7	1	0	4	1	0	0	42	8
Stoke City	1998–99	Second Division	18	2	2	0	0	0	2	0	22	2
Stoke City	Total		95	17	4	0	7	1	2	0	108	18
Blackpool	1999–2000	Second Division	13	0	2	0	0	0	1	0	16	0
Peterborough United	2000–01	Second Division	30	2	5	1	2	0	1	0	38	3
Peterborough United	2001–02	Second Division	32	0	4	0	2	1	1	0	39	1
Peterborough United	2002–03	Second Division	8	0	0	0	0	0	0	0	8	0
Peterborough United	Total		70	2	9	1	4	1	2	0	85	4
Cheltenham Town	2002–03	Second Division	12	2	3	0	0	0	2	1	17	3
Cheltenham Town	2003–04	Third Division	27	2	2	0	0	0	0	0	29	2
Cheltenham Town	Total		39	4	5	0	0	0	2	1	46	5
Northwich Victoria	2004–05	Football Conference	3	0	0	0	0	0	0	0	3	0
Career total			246	25	22	1	20	2	11	1	299	29

A. The "Other" column constitutes appearances and goals in the Anglo-Italian Cup, Football League Trophy.

== Honours ==
Kidderminster Harriers

- Conference National champions: 1994
