= Justin Whittle =

English footballer

Personal information
- Full name: Justin Philip Whittle
- Date of birth: 18 March 1971 (age 55)
- Place of birth: Derby, England
- Position: Centre back

Senior career*
Years	Team	Apps	(Gls)
1994	Celtic	0	(0)
1994–1998	Stoke City	79	(1)
1998–2004	Hull City	193	(3)
2004–2008	Grimsby Town	131	(3)
2008–2009	Harrogate Town	23	(1)
2009–2011	North Ferriby United	47	(2)
Total		473	(10)

Managerial career
- 2011: North Ferriby United (caretaker)
- * Club domestic league appearances and goals

Justin Philip Whittle (born 18 March 1971) is an English former professional footballer who played as a defender from 1994 until 2011.

As a player, he notably captained Humber derby clubs Hull City and Grimsby Town. He also appeared for Celtic where he started his career in 1994 before moving on to Stoke City. Following his departure from Grimsby in 2008 he moved into the Non-League game playing for Harrogate Town and North Ferriby United before retiring in 2011, where he briefly managed the club in a caretaker role whilst previously serving as assistant manager.

== Playing career ==
=== Stoke City ===
Whittle was born in Derby and began his career in the Army and was deployed to Germany where he served with the British Army of the Rhine. Whilst in Germany he played football in an army tournament and was spotted by scouts from Celtic and he joined them along with Gary Holt. After a season at Celtic both joined Lou Macari at Stoke City and Whittle made his professional debut away at Southend United in the 1995–96 season. He played in both of the club's play-off matches against Leicester City at the end of the season as Stoke lost 1–0. He made 40 appearances in 1996–97 as Stoke finished in a mid-table position of 12th. In 1997–98 Stoke suffered relegation to the Second Division, however Whittle did manage to win the player of the year award despite playing in just 20 league matches. Under Brian Little in 1998–99 he played in 15 matches scoring his only goal for Stoke against Reading on 3 October 1998. After falling out with manager Little, Whittle was sold to Hull City in November 1998.

=== Hull City ===
Justin spent six seasons at Hull City and was a firm fans' favourite there. He was recruited by Warren Joyce in 1998 while City were battling relegation from the Football League and became an integral part of the "Great Escape" team. He left after captaining the promotion-winning 2003–04 side – he was offered a new contract at Hull, but with no guarantee of first-team football he chose to accept an offer from Grimsby Town instead. Due to his cult status at Hull, his departure led to widespread criticism of manager Peter Taylor from the fans. Taylor however delivered a second promotion the following season, but many fans still wished that Whittle had still been there to be a part of this success.

=== Grimsby Town ===
Whittle joined Grimsby in time for the start of the 2004–05 season after it became apparent that first team opportunities would be limited at Hull due to an influx of new players and that he would lose the captaincy as a result. After an average first season with Grimsby, Whittle went from strength to strength, and provided a commanding force at the back for his club. His efforts in the 2005–06 season saw the club make an appearance at the Millennium Stadium in the play-offs, and go on an impressive run in the League Cup where the club defeated Derby County and Tottenham Hotspur before making an exit at the hands of Newcastle United. After playing in the heart of defence with many different players at the club it was surprisingly his partnership with Nick Fenton in the 2006–07 season that caught the eyes of the club's supporters.

Despite the club struggling in the league, Whittle was voted "Player of The Season" for his efforts and earned himself a 1-year contract extension. It was apparent from the start of the following season that Whittle was to play a smaller or less important role in the club's affairs. The number 6 shirt he had held since he arrived was stripped of him and he was listed as number 15 in the squad. Fitness and injury worries plagued Whittle and when fit, he was often named as a substitute playing second fiddle to the likes of Nick Fenton, Ryan Bennett and Rob Atkinson. As well as this Whittle was not used in the club's Wembley appearance in the Football League Trophy final in March. In April 2008 it was decided by the club that they would not offer Justin Whittle an extension to his contract and he left on good terms in May after playing some of his best football with the Mariners.

=== Harrogate Town ===
In the summer of 2008 Whittle signed for Conference North side Harrogate Town. Whittle went on to play in 23 games for Town before being released in March 2009.

=== North Ferriby United ===
Whittle signed for North Ferriby United in March 2009, slotting straight into his usual central defensive position. After two years with the Northern Premier League side Whittle retired from playing in football in 2011.

== Managerial & coaching career ==
Following his retirement Whittle became assistant manager at former club North Ferriby United in August 2011. Following the resignation of John Anderson on 11 September, Whittle took caretaker control of the first team alongside club captain Paul Foot. Whittle left the club in October following the appointment of manager Billy Heath and assistant Bobby Carroll.

== Personal life ==
Whittle is a former member of the Royal Army Pay Corps in the British Army where he served before embarking in his football career. Since retiring from football, Whittle has continued to reside in Kingston upon Hull where he often writes columns for local newspapers analysing his former club Hull City.

== Career statistics ==
Appearances and goals by club, season and competition
Club	Season	League			FA Cup		League Cup		Other^{[A]}		Total	
Club	Season	Division	Apps	Goals	Apps	Goals	Apps	Goals	Apps	Goals	Apps	Goals
Stoke City	1995–96	First Division	8	0	0	0	0	0	2	0	10	0
Stoke City	1996–97	First Division	37	0	1	0	2	0	0	0	40	0
Stoke City	1997–98	First Division	20	0	1	0	4	0	0	0	25	0
Stoke City	1998–99	Second Division	14	1	0	0	1	0	0	0	15	1
Stoke City	Total		79	1	2	0	7	0	2	0	90	1
Hull City	1998–99	Third Division	24	1	2	0	0	0	0	0	26	1
Hull City	1999–2000	Third Division	38	0	4	0	4	0	2	0	48	0
Hull City	2000–01	Third Division	38	0	0	0	2	0	2	0	42	0
Hull City	2001–02	Third Division	36	0	2	0	1	0	2	1	41	1
Hull City	2002–03	Third Division	39	1	1	0	1	0	0	0	41	1
Hull City	2003–04	Third Division	18	0	1	0	1	0	1	0	21	0
Hull City	Total		193	2	10	0	9	0	7	1	219	3
Grimsby Town	2004–05	League Two	40	1	1	0	2	0	0	0	43	1
Grimsby Town	2005–06	League Two	32	0	0	0	3	0	4	0	39	0
Grimsby Town	2006–07	League Two	37	1	2	0	1	0	1	0	41	1
Grimsby Town	2007–08	League Two	18	1	1	0	1	0	3	0	23	1
Grimsby Town	Total		131	3	5	0	7	0	8	0	151	3
Career total			403	6	17	0	23	0	17	1	460	7

A. The "Other" column constitutes appearances and goals in the Football League Trophy and Football League play-offs.

== Honours ==
Hull City

- Football League Third Division runner-up: 2003–04

Grimsby Town

- Football League Trophy runner up: 2007–08

Individual

- Stoke City Player of the Year: 1998
- Grimbsy Town Player of the Year: 2007
