= Jörg Sobiech =

German footballer

Personal information
- Full name: Jörg Sobiech
- Date of birth: 15 January 1969 (age 57)
- Place of birth: Gelsenkirchen, West Germany
- Position: Defender

Youth career
- –1987: Schalke 04

Senior career*
Years	Team	Apps	(Gls)
1987–1993	SG Wattenscheid 09	158	(0)
1993–1994	Stuttgarter Kickers	27	(1)
1994–1996	SG Wattenscheid 09	55	(2)
1996–1998	NEC Nijmegen	44	(0)
1998	→ Stoke City (loan)	3	(0)
1998–2000	FC Twente	33	(0)
2000	Waldhof Mannheim	1	(0)
2001	Chemnitzer FC	13	(0)
2001–2002	SG Wattenscheid 09	18	(0)
2003	STV Horst-Emscher	6	(0)
- * Club domestic league appearances and goals

Jörg Sobiech (born 15 January 1969) is a German former footballer who played as a defender.

== Career ==
Sobiech was born in Gelsenkirchen and began his career with local side FC Schalke 04. In 1987, he joined SG Wattenscheid 09 with whom he gain promotion to the Bundesliga in 1989–90. In 1993, he joined the Stuttgarter Kickers, but after a year returned to SG Wattenscheid 09. For the 1996–97 season he moved to NEC Nijmegen, with whom he played in the Eredivisie. From March to June 1998, he played on loan with Stoke City in the First Division. He made three appearances for Stoke in 1997–98 before he returned to the Netherlands and played for FC Twente. In 2000, he returned to Germany and played in the 2000–01 season with SV Waldhof Mannheim and then Chemnitzer FC in the 2nd Bundesliga. From 2001 to late 2002, he played again for SG Wattenscheid 09 and then after six months at STV Horst Emscher, Sobiech retired from football in the summer of 2003.

== Career statistics ==
Appearances and goals by club, season and competition
Club	Season	League			Cup		Total	
Club	Season	Division	Apps	Goals	Apps	Goals	Apps	Goals
SG Wattenscheid 09	1987–88	2. Bundesliga	12	0	0	0	12	0
SG Wattenscheid 09	1988–89	2. Bundesliga	27	0	1	0	28	0
SG Wattenscheid 09	1989–90	2. Bundesliga	38	0	2	0	40	0
SG Wattenscheid 09	1990–91	Bundesliga	34	0	4	0	38	0
SG Wattenscheid 09	1991–92	Bundesliga	33	0	1	0	34	0
SG Wattenscheid 09	1992–93	Bundesliga	14	0	1	0	15	0
SG Wattenscheid 09	Total		158	0	9	0	167	0
Stuttgarter Kickers	1993–94	2. Bundesliga	27	1	1	0	28	1
SG Wattenscheid 09	1994–95	2. Bundesliga	25	1	2	0	27	1
SG Wattenscheid 09	1995–96	2. Bundesliga	30	1	2	0	32	1
SG Wattenscheid 09	Total		55	2	4	0	59	2
NEC Nijmegen	1996–97	Eredivisie	32	0	0	0	32	0
NEC Nijmegen	1997–98	Eredivisie	12	0	0	0	12	0
NEC Nijmegen	Total		44	0	0	0	44	0
Stoke City (loan)	1997–98	First Division	3	0	0	0	3	0
FC Twente	1998–99	Eredivisie	29	0	0	0	29	0
FC Twente	1999–2000	Eredivisie	4	0	0	0	4	0
FC Twente	Total		33	0	0	0	33	0
Waldhof Mannheim	2000–01	2. Bundesliga	1	0	0	0	1	0
Chemnitzer FC	2000–01	2. Bundesliga	13	0	0	0	13	0
SG Wattenscheid 09	2001–02	Regionalliga Nord	18	0	0	0	13	0
STV Horst-Emscher	2002–03	Westfalenliga	6	0	0	0	6	0
Career total			358	3	14	0	372	3
