= Mark McNally (footballer) =

Scottish footballer

Personal information
- Full name: Mark McNally
- Date of birth: 10 March 1971 (age 55)
- Place of birth: Motherwell, Scotland
- Position: Defender

Senior career*
Years	Team	Apps	(Gls)
1987–1995	Celtic	122	(3)
1995–1997	Southend United	54	(2)
1997–1998	Stoke City	7	(0)
1998–1999	Dundee United	5	(0)
2000	Keflavík	9	(0)
2000	Ayr United	8	(0)
2000–2001	Partick Thistle	22	(1)
2001–2002	Clydebank	19	(0)
2002–2008	Stirling Albion	127	(0)
Total		374	(6)

International career
1990–1993	Scotland U21	2	(0)
- * Club domestic league appearances and goals

Mark McNally (born 10 March 1971) is a Scottish former footballer who played in defence, primarily as a centre-half although he also played occasionally at right-back.

== Career ==
=== Celtic to England ===
McNally began his career with Celtic youths and progressed on to the first team, making his debut against Motherwell in November 1990 in a 2–1 win. McNally went on to become a regular member of the Celtic first team for the next few seasons, making over 100 league appearances. He struggled for a place in the team during season 1994–95 under new manager Tommy Burns, but still won the Scottish Cup Final in what transpired to be his final game for the club. After a very brief period on loan at Manchester City, McNally was transferred to Southend United in December 1995 for £50,000. McNally made his debut for Southend United on 17 August 1996 against Tranmere Rovers. McNally spent two seasons with Southend United making over fifty league appearances for the club before being transferred to Stoke City for £120,000 in 1997. McNally made his debut for Stoke City on 31 March 1997 against Bradford City. McNally was released by Stoke City at the end of the 1997–98 season after making only seven appearances for the club.

=== Return to Scotland ===
After McNally was released by Stoke City he returned to Scotland to join Dundee United making his debut for the club against Kilmarnock on 1 August 1998. In January 2000 McNally was placed on loan to Ayr United until the end of the season. McNally made his debut for Ayr United on 12 February 2000 against Falkirk. At the end on the 1999/2000 season McNally was released by Dundee United to enable him to sign up for Partick Thistle. McNally made his debut for Partick on 7 October 2000. McNally was at Partick for a season, scoring once against Stranraer, and was released despite being the fans player of the season. After being released by Partick Thistle, McNally was signed by Clydebank making his debut on 4 August 2001 against Forfar Athletic. McNally stayed at Clydebank until the club removed from both the Scottish Football League and the Scottish Football Association. McNally went on to join former Partick Thistle teammate Allan Moore at Stirling Albion where he made his debut against Albion Rovers on 3 August 2002. McNally went on to make over 100 appearances for Stirling Albion and in 2005 McNally was appointed as Assistant manager, McNally remained as a player with the club.

McNally left Stirling Albion at the end of the 2007–08 season to join the Scottish Football Association as part of the youth coaching system.

=== Managerial career ===
At the beginning of the 2007–08 season McNally started as a full-time Assistant Manager for Stirling Albion.

On 9 June 2010 he was appointed as Allan Moore's assistant at Greenock Morton. He and Moore were sacked on 23 November 2013 after a 5–1 home defeat to Livingston.

McNally has been a coach with Celtic's youth academy since 2013.

== Career statistics ==
Appearances and goals by club, season and competition
Club	Season	League			FA Cup		League Cup		Other		Total	
Club	Season	Division	Apps	Goals	Apps	Goals	Apps	Goals	Apps	Goals	Apps	Goals
Celtic	1990–91	Scottish Premier Division	19	0	3	0	0	0	0	0	22	0
Celtic	1991–92	Scottish Premier Division	24	1	0	0	1	0	3	0	28	1
Celtic	1992–93	Scottish Premier Division	27	0	3	0	3	0	2	0	35	0
Celtic	1993–94	Scottish Premier Division	32	2	1	0	4	1	2	0	39	3
Celtic	1994–95	Scottish Premier Division	20	0	3	0	5	0	0	0	28	0
Celtic	Total		122	3	10	0	13	1	7	0	152	4
Southend United	1981–82	First Division	20	2	1	0	0	0	0	0	21	2
Southend United	1996–97	First Division	34	0	1	0	2	0	0	0	37	0
Southend United	Total		54	2	2	0	2	0	0	0	58	2
Stoke City	1996–97	First Division	3	0	0	0	0	0	0	0	3	0
Stoke City	1997–98	First Division	4	0	0	0	0	0	0	0	4	0
Stoke City	Total		7	0	0	0	0	0	0	0	7	0
Dundee United	1998–99	Scottish Premier League	5	0	0	0	1	0	0	0	6	0
Keflavík	2000	Úrvalsdeild	9	0	0	0	0	0	0	0	9	0
Ayr United	1999–2000	Scottish First Division	8	0	0	0	0	0	0	0	8	0
Partick Thistle	2000–01	Scottish Second Division	22	1	0	0	2	0	0	0	24	1
Clydebank	2001–02	Scottish Second Division	19	0	0	0	0	0	1	0	20	0
Stirling Albion	2002–03	Scottish Third Division	30	0	1	0	1	0	1	0	33	0
Stirling Albion	2003–04	Scottish Third Division	22	0	2	0	1	0	1	0	26	0
Stirling Albion	2004–05	Scottish Second Division	21	0	1	0	2	0	2	0	26	0
Stirling Albion	2005–06	Scottish Second Division	29	0	2	0	0	0	2	0	33	0
Stirling Albion	2006–07	Scottish Second Division	28	0	3	0	0	0	4	0	35	0
Stirling Albion	Total		130	0	9	0	4	0	10	0	153	0
Career total			376	6	21	0	22	1	18	0	437	7

== Honours ==
- Scottish Cup: 1

1994–95

- Scottish League Cup Runner-up: 1

1994–95
