= Wesley Byrne =

Irish footballer

Personal information
- Full name: Wesley John Byrne
- Date of birth: 9 February 1977 (age 49)
- Place of birth: Dublin, Ireland
- Height: 5 ft 9 in (1.75 m)
- Position: Full back

Youth career
- Belvedere

Senior career*
Years	Team	Apps	(Gls)
1994–1996	Middlesbrough	0	(0)
1996	Stoke City	0	(0)
1996–1997	Darlington	2	(0)
1997–1998	Gateshead	16	(0)
1998–2003	Longford Town	?	(?)
2003–2005	Dublin City	?	(?)

International career
- Republic of Ireland U16
- Republic of Ireland U17
- * Club domestic league appearances and goals

Wesley John Byrne (born 9 February 1977 in Dublin, Ireland) was an Irish footballer who played as a full back for Darlington in The Football League and Longford Town in the League of Ireland. Wesley enjoyed a successful spell with Longford Town, helping them gain promotion to the Premier Division and leading them to the 2001 FAI Cup Final.

== Career statistics ==
Club	Season	League			FA Cup		League Cup		Other		Total	
Club	Season	Division	Apps	Goals	Apps	Goals	Apps	Goals	Apps	Goals	Apps	Goals
Middlesbrough	1995–96	First Division	0	0	0	0	0	0	0	0	0	0
Stoke City	1996–97	First Division	0	0	0	0	0	0	0	0	0	0
Darlington	1996–97	Third Division	2	0	0	0	0	0	0	0	2	0
Career total			2	0	0	0	0	0	0	0	2	0
