= Steven Taaffe =

English footballer

Personal information
- Full name: Steven Lee Taaffe
- Date of birth: 10 September 1979 (age 47)
- Place of birth: Stoke-on-Trent, England
- Position: Striker

Youth career
- 1995–1997: Stoke City

Senior career*
Years	Team	Apps	(Gls)
1997–2000	Stoke City	8	(0)
2001–2002	Northwich Victoria		
- * Club domestic league appearances and goals

Steven Lee Taaffe (born 10 September 1979) is an English former footballer who played in the Football League for Stoke City.

== Career ==
Taaffe was born in Stoke-on-Trent and began his career with local side Stoke City making his debut towards the end of the 1997–98 season making three substitute appearances. He made a further three appearances in 1998–99 and 1999–2000 but was not able to establish himself in the first team and was released in the summer of 2000. He went on to play for non-league Northwich Victoria.

== Career statistics ==
Appearances and goals by club, season and competition
Club	Season	League			FA Cup		League Cup		Total	
Club	Season	Division	Apps	Goals	Apps	Goals	Apps	Goals	Apps	Goals
Stoke City	1997–98	First Division	3	0	0	0	0	0	3	0
Stoke City	1998–99	Second Division	3	0	0	0	0	0	3	0
Stoke City	1999–2000	Second Division	2	0	0	0	1	0	3	0
Career total			8	0	0	0	1	0	9	0
