= Mike Macari =

Scottish footballer

Personal information
- Full name: Michael Macari
- Date of birth: 4 February 1973 (age 53)
- Place of birth: Kilwinning, Scotland
- Height: 5 ft 5 in (1.65 m)
- Position: Striker

Youth career
- 1991–1992: West Ham United
- 1992–1996: Stoke City

Senior career*
Years	Team	Apps	(Gls)
1996–1997	Stoke City	30	(3)
- * Club domestic league appearances and goals

Michael Macari (born 4 February 1973) is a Scottish former professional footballer who played for Stoke City as a striker.

== Career ==
Macari began his career with the West Ham United youth team, before joining Stoke City in 1992 along with his father Lou, who became Stoke's manager. He made his debut in the 1996–97 season where he played in 30 matches scoring three goals. He was released at the end of the season after his father left the club and never played senior football again.

== Family ==
Macari's father Lou and brother Paul were also professional footballers. Another brother, Jonathan, committed suicide in 1999 after being released by Nottingham Forest.

== Career statistics ==
Club	Season	League			FA Cup		League Cup		Total	
Club	Season	Division	Apps	Goals	Apps	Goals	Apps	Goals	Apps	Goals
Stoke City	1996–97	First Division	30	3	1	0	3	0	34	3
Career Total			30	3	1	0	3	0	34	3
