= 1997–98 Stoke City F.C. season =

Stoke City
1997–98 season
- Chairman: Peter Coates
- Manager: Chic Bates, Chris Kamara, Alan Durban
- Stadium: Britannia Stadium
- Football League First Division: 23rd (46 Points)
- FA Cup: Third Round
- League Cup: Third Round
- Top goalscorer: League: Peter Thorne (12); All: Peter Thorne (16)
- Highest home attendance: 26,664 vs Manchester City (3 May 1998)
- Lowest home attendance: 8,423 vs Oxford United (4 November 1997)
- Average home league attendance: 15,015
Home colours

The 1997–98 season was Stoke City's 91st season in the Football League and the 35th in the second tier. It was also Stoke's first season at the Britannia Stadium.

With Stoke now at a new home after 119 years at the Victoria Ground the hope was it would be the start of a new era for the club. Following Lou Macari's departure, his assistant Chic Bates was appointed as manager but the first league match in the Britannia Stadium was lost 2–1 against Swindon Town. Results were generally quite good and by the end of October Stoke were in a play-off position. However performances completely dropped off and the club dropped down the table like a stone and on 10 January 1998 Birmingham City beat Stoke 7–0 at home which sparked ugly scenes from some angry supporters. Bates and Peter Coates left as Stoke headed for relegation. Chris Kamara came in but was sacked after winning just one of his 14 matches in charge. Former manager Alan Durban returned for the final few matches which saw Stoke needing to beat Manchester City on the final day to stay up. They lost 5–2 and fell into the third tier.

== Season review ==
=== League ===
The dawn of a new era at the Britannia Stadium should have been full of hope, but the departure of Lou Macari still not fully explained plus the farcical search for a replacement, left fans wondering what exactly was going on. Many felt the delay in announcing the new manager was a way of boosting season ticket sales with many expecting Sammy McIlroy to be named as the new boss but the silence was deafening and caretaker Chic Bates was left to take care of pre-season training. It soon became clear that Bates was going to be give the role full-time and in July he duly was much to the disappointment of many. Former manager Alan Durban made a return to the club as Bates' assistant to help take away some of his responsibilities. If Stoke had bid farewell to the Victoria Ground in a blaze of glory then the fiasco in opening the Britannia Stadium was a pit of despair. There was transport problems, ticket problems and the opening ceremony against Swindon Town was awful.

The only major signing was that of striker Peter Thorne for £550,000 whilst a small spattering of players arrived from Europe following Jean-Marc Bosman's court victory for footballers contracts. Chairman Peter Coates was now very unpopular with the supporters and there were many protests against him due to Coates not spending his money. Attendances at the new ground were poor and by Christmas Stoke had lost their early season form and were in serious trouble. The slump was brought to head early in the new year when Birmingham City beat Stoke 7–0 at home which prompted ugly scenes at the final whistle as around 2,000 fans invaded the pitch and attempted to enter the directors box. The next match live on TV against Bradford City saw more fan protests and Coates resigned as chairman.

On the pitch Bates was clearly not cut to be a manager and so was replaced by former Bradford boss Chris Kamara. He arrived with bold intentions claiming that he would build a squad good enough to take Stoke into the Premiership, But he sold the only real player of value, Andy Griffin and in his 14 matches in charge only one was won and after an awful 3–0 defeat against Tranmere Rovers he lost his job. Kamara's time at Stoke was a disaster and with Stoke heading for relegation Alan Durban took over for the remaining matches. Three wins in four home matches gave Stoke some hope, but a 5–2 defeat against Manchester City on the final day saw the inevitable happen (albeit results elsewhere meant both teams would have been relegated irrespective of the result) and Stoke were relegated as were Man City despite their big win.

=== FA Cup ===
Stoke lost to West Bromwich Albion 3–1 in the third round.

=== League Cup ===
Stoke beat Rochdale and Burnley before being knocked out by Leeds United.

== Final league table ==
Pos	Team	Pld	W	D	L	GF	GA	GD	Pts	Qualification or relegation
20	Portsmouth	46	13	10	23	51	63	−12	49	
21	Queens Park Rangers	46	10	19	17	51	63	−12	49	
22	Manchester City (R)	46	12	12	22	56	57	−1	48	Relegation to the Second Division
23	Stoke City (R)	46	11	13	22	44	74	−30	46	Relegation to the Second Division
24	Reading (R)	46	11	9	26	39	78	−39	42	Relegation to the Second Division

Source: Statto.com
Rules for classification: 1) Points; 2) Goals scored; 3) Goal difference
(R) Relegated

== Results ==
Stoke's score comes first

=== Legend ===
Win	Draw	Loss

=== Football League First Division ===
Match	Date	Opponent	Venue	Result	Attendance	Scorers
1	9 August 1997	Birmingham City	A	0–2	20,608	
2	15 August 1997	Bradford City	A	0–0	13,823	
3	23 August 1997	Middlesbrough	A	1–0	30,122	Stewart 60'
4	30 August 1997	Swindon Town	H	1–2	23,000	Forsyth 34'
5	3 September 1997	West Bromwich Albion	H	0–0	17,500	
6	13 September 1997	Stockport County	H	2–1	11,743	Wallace 28', Thorne 50'
7	20 September 1997	Ipswich Town	A	3–2	10,665	Thorne (2) 13' 30', Stewart 55'
8	27 September 1997	Nottingham Forest	A	0–1	19,018	
9	4 October 1997	Bury	H	3–2	11,760	Andrade 63', Forsyth 69', Thorne 73'
10	12 October 1997	Port Vale	H	2–1	20,125	Forsyth 5', Keen 34'
11	19 October 1997	Charlton Athletic	A	1–1	12,345	Wallace 51'
12	22 October 1997	Manchester City	A	1–0	25,333	Wallace 63'
13	25 October 1997	Sunderland	H	1–2	14,587	Stewart 81'
14	1 November 1997	Huddersfield Town	A	1–3	10,916	Griffin 79'
15	4 November 1997	Oxford United	H	0–0	8,423	
16	8 November 1997	Wolverhampton Wanderers	H	3–0	18,490	Kavanagh (2) 8', 23' (pen), Forsyth 60'
17	15 November 1997	Queens Park Rangers	A	1–1	11,923	Forsyth 7'
18	22 November 1997	Tranmere Rovers	A	1–3	8,009	Kavanagh 35' (pen)
19	29 November 1997	Reading	H	1–2	11,103	Thorne 81'
20	2 December 1997	Sheffield United	A	2–3	14,347	Thorne (2) 8', 63'
21	6 December 1997	Portsmouth	A	0–2	7,072	
22	13 December 1997	Crewe Alexandra	H	0–2	14,623	
23	20 December 1997	Norwich City	A	0–0	12,265	
24	26 December 1997	Sheffield United	H	2–2	19,723	Forsyth 66', Thorne 86'
25	28 December 1997	West Bromwich Albion	A	1–1	17,690	Thorne 47'
26	10 January 1998	Birmingham City	H	0–7	14,940	
27	16 January 1998	Bradford City	H	2–1	10,459	Forsyth 65' (pen), Thorne 42'
28	28 January 1998	Swindon Town	A	0–1	6,683	
29	1 February 1998	Middlesbrough	H	1–2	13,242	Kavanagh 35' (pen)
30	7 February 1998	Ipswich Town	H	1–1	11,416	Holsgrove 15'
31	14 February 1998	Stockport County	A	0–1	8,701	
32	17 February 1998	Bury	A	0–0	5,802	
33	21 February 1998	Nottingham Forest	H	1–1	16,899	Crowe 32'
34	25 February 1998	Charlton Athletic	H	1–2	10,027	Kavanagh 42'
35	1 March 1998	Port Vale	A	0–0	13,853	
36	4 March 1998	Wolverhampton Wanderers	A	1–1	21,058	Crowe 89'
37	7 March 1998	Huddersfield Town	H	1–2	12,594	Tiatto 90'
38	14 March 1998	Oxford United	A	1–5	7,300	Crowe 69'
39	21 March 1998	Queens Park Rangers	H	2–1	11,051	Dowie (o.g.) 21', Crowe 51'
40	28 March 1998	Tranmere Rovers	H	0–3	16,692	
41	4 April 1998	Reading	A	0–2	10,448	
42	11 April 1998	Portsmouth	H	2–1	15,569	Pickering 78', Lightbourne 90'
43	13 April 1998	Crewe Alexandra	A	0–2	5,759	
44	18 April 1998	Norwich City	H	2–0	13,098	Sigurðsson 19', Lightbourne 50'
45	25 April 1998	Sunderland	A	0–3	41,214	
46	3 May 1998	Manchester City	H	2–5	26,664	Thorne (2) 62', 87'

=== FA Cup ===
Round	Date	Opponent	Venue	Result	Attendance	Scorers
R3	13 January 1998	West Bromwich Albion	A	1–3	17,598	Gabbiadini 61'

=== League Cup ===
Round	Date	Opponent	Venue	Result	Attendance	Scorers
R1 1st Leg	12 August 1997	Rochdale	A	3–1	2,509	Kavanagh 26', Thorne 67', Forsyth 70'
R1 2nd Leg	27 August 1997	Rochdale	H	1–1	12,768	Kavanagh 85'
R2 1st Leg	16 September 1997	Burnley	A	4–0	4,175	Thorne (2) 37', 62', Kavanagh (2) 68', 80'
R2 2nd Leg	24 September 1997	Burnley	H	2–0	6,041	Keen 36', Thorne 71'
R3	15 November 1997	Leeds United	H	1–3	16,203	Kavanagh 66' (pen)

== Squad statistics ==
Pos.	Name	League		FA Cup		League Cup		Total		Discipline	
Pos.	Name	Apps	Goals	Apps	Goals	Apps	Goals	Apps	Goals	Yellow card	Red card
GK	(England) Carl Muggleton	34	0	1	0	5	0	40	0	0	0
GK	(Wales) Neville Southall	12	0	0	0	0	0	12	0	0	0
DF	(England) Andy Griffin	23	1	1	0	4	0	28	1	1	0
DF	(Scotland) Tosh McKinlay	3	0	0	0	0	0	3	0	0	1
DF	(Scotland) Mark McNally	3(1)	0	0	0	0	0	3(1)	0	0	0
DF	(England) Ally Pickering	42	1	1	0	5	0	48	1	8	0
DF	(Iceland) Lárus Sigurðsson	43	1	1	0	5	0	49	1	8	0
DF	(Scotland) Steven Tweed	35(3)	0	1	0	5	0	41(3)	0	6	0
DF	(England) Ray Wallace	36(3)	3	1	0	5	0	42(3)	3	7	0
DF	(England) Justin Whittle	15(5)	0	1	0	0(4)	0	16(9)	0	3	1
DF	(England) Steve Woods	0(1)	0	0	0	0	0	0(1)	0	0	0
MF	(England) Richard Forsyth	37	7	1	0	4	1	42	8	3	0
MF	(England) Robert Heath	4(2)	0	0	0	0	0	4(2)	0	0	0
MF	(England) Paul Holsgrove	11(1)	1	0	0	0	0	11(1)	1	2	0
MF	(Republic of Ireland) Graham Kavanagh	44	5	0	0	4(1)	5	48(1)	10	7	0
MF	(England) Kevin Keen	37(3)	1	1	0	5	1	43(3)	2	3	0
MF	(England) Neil MacKenzie	7(5)	0	0	0	1(1)	0	8(6)	0	0	0
MF	(Northern Ireland) Gerry McMahon	7(10)	0	0	0	2(1)	0	9(11)	0	0	0
MF	(England) Kofi Nyamah	9(1)	0	0	0	1(1)	0	10(2)	0	2	0
MF	(Netherlands) Dick Schreuder	0	0	0	0	0(2)	0	0(2)	0	0	0
MF	(Republic of Ireland) Tony Scully	7	0	0	0	0	0	7	0	0	0
MF	(Germany) Jörg Sobiech	3	0	0	0	0	0	3	0	0	0
FW	(Cape Verde) José Andrade	4(8)	1	0	0	2	0	6(8)	1	0	0
FW	(England) Richard Burgess	0	0	0	0	0	0	0	0	0	0
FW	(England) Dean Crowe	10(6)	4	0	0	1(1)	0	11(7)	4	2	0
FW	(England) O'Neill Donaldson	2	0	0	0	0	0	2	0	0	0
FW	(England) Marco Gabbiadini	2(6)	0	1	1	0	0	3(6)	1	0	0
FW	(Bermuda) Kyle Lightbourne	9(4)	2	0	0	0	0	9(4)	2	0	0
FW	(Scotland) Paul Macari	0(3)	0	0	0	0	0	0(3)	0	0	0
FW	(England) Paul Stewart	22	3	1	0	2	0	25	3	5	0
FW	(England) Simon Sturridge	0(1)	0	0	0	0(1)	0	0(2)	0	0	0
FW	(England) Steven Taaffe	0(3)	0	0	0	0	0	0(3)	0	0	0
FW	(England) Peter Thorne	33(3)	12	0(1)	0	4	4	37(4)	16	5	0
FW	(Australia) Danny Tiatto	11(4)	1	0	0	0	0	11(4)	1	6	0
FW	(Canada) Davide Xausa	1	0	0	0	0	0	1	0	0	0
–	Own goals	–	1	–	0	–	0	–	1	–	–
