= Peter Thomson (footballer) =

English footballer

Personal information
- Full name: Peter David Thomson
- Date of birth: 30 June 1977 (age 49)
- Place of birth: Bury, England
- Position: Striker

Youth career
- 199?–1995: Stand Athletic
- 1995–1997: Bury

Senior career*
Years	Team	Apps	(Gls)
1997	Chorley	7	(3)
1997–1999	Lancaster City	28	(24)
1999–2000	NAC Breda	5	(0)
2000–2002	Luton Town	11	(2)
2001	→Rushden & Diamonds (loan)	2	(1)
2002	Morecambe	3	(1)
2002–2003	Southport	28	(15)
2003–2005	Lancaster City	30	(14)
2005–2006	Stafford Rangers	25	(10)
2006–2007	Altrincham	7	(1)
2007	Barrow	3	(1)
2007	FC United of Manchester		
- * Club domestic league appearances and goals as of 02:20, 16 September 2007 (UTC)

Peter David Thomson (born 30 June 1977 in Bury, England) is a former professional footballer.

== Career ==
Thomson began his career with Bury 1995. He joined Lancaster City in the summer of 1998, having spent a season with Chorley, and made an immediate impact in the Northern Premier League and his impressive scoring form of 24 goals in 28 appearances earned him a move to Dutch side NAC Breda for a five figure fee. He made five premier league team appearances for the Dutch side without scoring.

Thomson joined Luton Town in 2000. In two seasons at Kenilworth Road he made 11 League appearances, scoring 3 goals. Scoring twice against Stoke City in a memorable 3–1 away win. He also played two League games whilst on loan at Rushden & Diamonds, scoring once on his debut.

He had a brief spell with Morecambe, scoring against Dagenham & Redbridge on his home debut with an overhead kick. Thomson joined Southport in July 2002. He returned to Lancaster City in December 2003 and enjoyed further success with Stafford Rangers in the summer of 2005. After his debut in a July 2006 friendly at Cammell Laird, injury sidelined him for the rest of the friendlies and the first months of the season. Thompson made his reserve debut in October 2006 and his first start for the first team came at Halifax on New Year's Day 2007, where he scored. But he was unable to command a regular place in the team and his contract was paid up at the end of March 2007.

He joined Barrow in June 2007 but was released in September having only played a handful of games. Thomson's last competitive game was for FC United of Manchester in the Northern Premier League First Division North. He scored on his debut against Ossett Albion during a match the Rebels won 3–1 but only appeared in three more games before retiring from semi-pro football.

Once this part of his career had finished, he set upon his next role as the manservant of His Most Honorable Lord Jonathan Frodsham, a time which Peter reference's as 'The best days of my life'.
