= Hugo Costa =

Portuguese footballer

Personal information
- Full name: Hugo Alexandre Esteves Costa
- Date of birth: 4 November 1973 (age 52)
- Place of birth: Tramagal, Portugal
- Height: 1.84 m (6 ft 0 in)
- Position: Centre-back

Youth career
- 1984–1992: Benfica

Senior career*
Years	Team	Apps	(Gls)
1992–1993	Gil Vicente	24	(2)
1993–1995	Beira-Mar	50	(1)
1995–1996	Estrela Amadora	10	(0)
1996	Stoke City	2	(0)
1996–2001	Alverca	103	(2)
2001–2003	Vitória Setúbal	56	(2)
2003–2005	Rot-Weiß Oberhausen	34	(0)
2006–2008	União Leiria	16	(1)
2008–2009	Atromitos Yeroskipou	6	(1)
2009–2011	Pinhalnovense	38	(0)
Total		339	(9)

International career
1995–1996	Portugal U21	8	(1)
- * Club domestic league appearances and goals

Hugo Alexandre Esteves Costa (born 4 November 1973) is a Portuguese former professional footballer who played as a central defender.

== Club career ==
Costa was born in Tramagal, Santarém District. A graduate of S.L. Benfica's youth system, he never appeared however for its first team, going on to spend the following four seasons in the Primeira Liga with Gil Vicente FC, S.C. Beira-Mar and C.F. Estrela da Amadora, being relegated with the second club in 1994–95.

In summer 1996, Costa signed with Stoke City of the English Football League Second Division. He left the Potters after only a couple of weeks and games, returning to his country with F.C. Alverca and remaining five seasons with the Lisbon outskirts side, three spent in the top flight.

From 2001 to 2003, also as first choice and in the main division, Costa played with Vitória de Setúbal. Subsequently, he joined Germany's Rot-Weiß Oberhausen (2. Bundesliga), staying two years in the country and suffering relegation in his second.

Costa returned to Portugal midway through the 2005–06 campaign and signed a six-month contract with U.D. Leiria, playing only 16 matches in the top tier over a three-year spell; 12 of those came in 2007–08, with the team ranking 16th and last. Afterwards, the 34-year-old moved to Cyprus with Atromitos Yeroskipou.

One year later, Costa once again returned to his homeland, agreeing to a deal at lowly C.D. Pinhalnovense. He left in 2011 aged nearly 38 and retired shortly after, subsequently working as a manager in amateur football.

== Career statistics ==
Appearances and goals by club, season and competition
Club	Season	League			Cup		League Cup		Other		Total	
Club	Season	Division	Apps	Goals	Apps	Goals	Apps	Goals	Apps	Goals	Apps	Goals
Gil Vicente	1992–93	Primeira Liga	24	2	0	0	0	0	0	0	24	2
Beira-Mar	1993–94	Primeira Liga	24	0	0	0	0	0	0	0	24	0
Beira-Mar	1994–95	Primeira Liga	26	1	0	0	0	0	0	0	26	1
Beira-Mar	Total		50	1	0	0	0	0	0	0	50	1
Estrela Amadora	1995–96	Primeira Liga	10	0	0	0	0	0	0	0	10	0
Stoke City	1996–97	First Division	2	0	0	0	2	0	0	0	4	0
Alverca	1996–97	Segunda Liga	6	0	0	0	0	0	0	0	6	0
Alverca	1997–98	Segunda Liga	30	0	2	0	0	0	0	0	32	0
Alverca	1998–99	Primeira Liga	29	0	0	0	0	0	0	0	29	0
Alverca	1999–2000	Primeira Liga	25	1	0	0	0	0	0	0	25	1
Alverca	2000–01	Primeira Liga	13	1	0	0	0	0	0	0	13	1
Alverca	Total		103	2	2	0	0	0	0	0	105	2
Vitória Setúbal	2001–02	Primeira Liga	31	1	0	0	0	0	0	0	31	1
Vitória Setúbal	2002–03	Primeira Liga	25	1	1	0	0	0	0	0	26	1
Vitória Setúbal	Total		56	2	1	0	0	0	0	0	57	2
Rot-Weiß Oberhausen	2003–04	2. Bundesliga	24	0	1	0	0	0	0	0	25	0
Rot-Weiß Oberhausen	2004–05	2. Bundesliga	10	0	1	0	0	0	0	0	11	0
Rot-Weiß Oberhausen	Total		34	0	2	0	0	0	0	0	36	0
União Leiria	2005–06	Primeira Liga	1	1	0	0	0	0	0	0	1	1
União Leiria	2006–07	Primeira Liga	3	0	0	0	0	0	0	0	3	0
União Leiria	2007–08	Primeira Liga	12	0	1	0	2	0	6	0	21	0
União Leiria	Total		16	1	1	0	2	0	6	0	25	6
Atromitos Yeroskipou	2008–09	Cypriot First Division	6	1	0	0	0	0	0	0	6	1
Pinhalnovense	2009–10	Segunda Divisão	27	0	5	1	0	0	0	0	32	1
Pinhalnovense	2010–11	Segunda Divisão	11	0	2	0	0	0	0	0	13	0
Pinhalnovense	Total		38	0	7	1	0	0	0	0	45	1
Career total			339	9	13	1	4	0	6	0	362	10
