= Jez Moxey =

English football businessman (born 1963)

- Born: Jeremy Derek Moxey; 19 April 1963 (age 63); Hemel Hempstead, England
- Known for: Previously being chief executive of Wolverhampton Wanderers, Stoke City, and Norwich City
- Board member of: Burton Albion

Jeremy Derek "Jez" Moxey (born 19 April 1963) is an English football businessman who is a non-executive director of Burton Albion, a member of the board of the English Football League, and head of sport team mergers and acquisitions at General Sports Worldwide, a sports marketing and management firm. He has previously been chief executive at Wolverhampton Wanderers, Stoke City and Norwich City.

== Career ==
Moxey, a basketball player in his youth, ran a sports marketing business, a basketball franchise, spent five years as general manager of Partick Thistle, and worked with Rangers, before his appointment as chief executive of Stoke City in 1995. He was responsible for the construction of and move to the Britannia Stadium in 1997, and led the negotiations which saw an Icelandic consortium purchase a controlling interest in the club.

Moxey joined Wolverhampton Wanderers as chief executive and, by extension, a director of the club in June 2000, roles he held until 2016. During his time at the club they were twice promoted to the Premier League but never sustained that position for more than three seasons.

Moxey was very unpopular with Wolves fans, with a vocal majority citing his reluctance to open the purse strings as a factor in Wolves' lack of impact in the Premier League. Moxey acknowledged that the club had under-invested in the 2003–04 season, yet went on to make the same mistakes on their next promotion in 2009–10 and the subsequent two seasons. He was also widely derided for trying to placate displaced season ticket holders in a crunch match against arch rivals West Bromwich Albion with his risible "Pie & Pint" offer.

From 2010 to 2012 Moxey was a member of the FA Council as one of the division's representatives. Moxey formally left his post with Wolves on 5 August 2016, shortly after Wolves was acquired by new owners Fosun, having spent 16 years and two months with the club.

In November 2015, Moxey was voted FC Business CEO of the Year for the Championship at the 4th annual Football Business Awards.

On 27 July 2016, Moxey was announced as the new chief executive of Norwich City On 2 February 2017, Moxey left his role with Norwich City, after a reported breakdown in relations between Moxey and Norwich City major shareholder Delia Smith.

Moxey was appointed a non-executive director of Burton Albion on 3 July 2017. Burton Albion was relegated from the EFL Championship at the end of the 2017–18 EFL Championship, Moxey's first season as a Burton director, meaning that Moxey lost his position as Championship representative on the EFL board, a post he had held since 2015 when still CEO at Wolves. He returned to the EFL board as a League One representative in June 2019, and was reappointed for a further term in June 2022.

Moxey is head of sport team mergers and acquisitions at General Sports Worldwide, a sports marketing and management firm. In 2023, he was appointed to help Scottish Premiership side St Johnstone and English National League side Southend United find new buyers.

== Personal life ==
Moxey and his American-born wife Babette have four children.
