= 2007–08 Sunderland A.F.C. season =

English football club season

Sunderland
2007–08 season
- Chairman: Niall Quinn
- Manager: Roy Keane
- Premier League: 15th
- FA Cup: Third round
- League Cup: Second round
- Top goalscorer: League: Kenwyne Jones (7); All: Kenwyne Jones (7)
- Highest home attendance: 47,802 (11 May vs Arsenal)
- Lowest home attendance: 20,821 (5 January vs Wigan Athletic)
- Average home league attendance: 42,218
Home colours	Away colours	Third colours

The 2007–08 season was the 113th full season in Sunderland A.F.C.'s history, their 107th in the league system of English football, their 7th in the Premier League, and their 78th in the top flight. After finishing 1st in the Championship during the 2006–07 season, Sunderland were promoted to the Premier League as champions. Sunderland had been relegated in the 2005–06 season with the record low points tally at the time of 15. The 2007–08 season was Roy Keane's first as a manager in the Premier League having won the Championship in his debut season.

Keane introduced 12 new signings in pre-season and allowed seven players to leave the club. They won their first game of the season, but subsequently started to struggle for points, winning just two games in their first 16. Their longest winning streak came towards the end of the season as they won three consecutive games. This late run helped Sunderland finish 15th, though they only won two away games, of which the first came in late March. The team suffered first round exits in two of the cup competitions they entered: in the second round of the League Cup and the third round of the FA Cup. Kenwyne Jones was the club's top goalscorer, recording 7 goals in the league. Left-back Danny Collins was named as Sunderland's player of the season, while on loan centre-back Jonny Evans was named as the club's young player of the season for the second season running. The club's average attendance of 42,728 was the fifth highest in the division.

== Background ==
Discussions of takeover were held over the summer involving an Irish group, the Drumaville Consortium, led by Niall Quinn. They completed the takeover in July for £10 million as Quinn's group took 72.59% of the club's shares. During the 2006–07 season, Roy Keane took over as manager from chairman Niall Quinn, who served as manager for the first six games of the season. Keane had a successful start to his managerial career with a 2–1 win over Derby County on 11 September 2006. On transfer window deadline day, Keane signed new players; Dwight Yorke, Liam Miller, Ross Wallace, Stanislav Varga, Graham Kavanagh and David Connolly. A 2–0 win over Leicester City on 1 January 2007 sparked an 18-game unbeaten streak for Sunderland, which was eventually ended on 21 April 2007 after a 3–1 defeat at the hands of Colchester United.

Sunderland reached the top of the Football League Championship for the first time in the season with a 2–1 win over Southampton, which included an 87th-minute winner from Grant Leadbitter. Their promotion was confirmed as third placed team Derby County lost 2–0 to Crystal Palace, as a result Birmingham City were also promoted. On the last day of the season, the Championship title would be decided. Sunderland won their game 5–0 against Luton Town, while Birmingham suffered a defeat against Preston North End thus crowning Sunderland as champions.

== Review ==
=== Pre-season ===
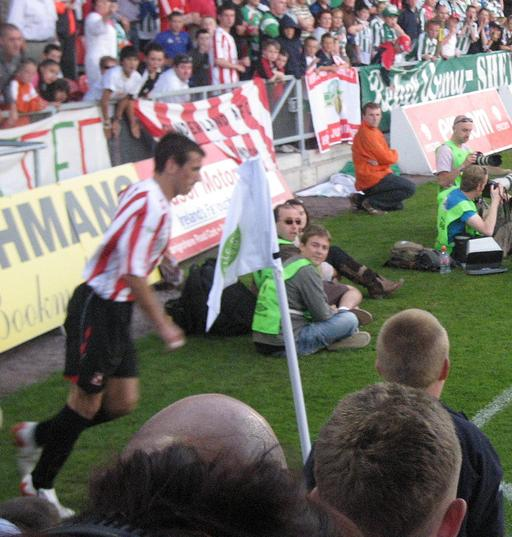
Liam Miller playing against Cork City in Sunderland's pre-season tour of Ireland.

Sunderland's pre-season was busy with transfer activity, seeing eight players come in, and five players leave. Kenny Cunningham retired, Tommy Miller, William Mocquet, Kevin Smith were released, while Robbie Weir, Jamie Chandler and David Dowson were all promoted to the first team from the club's youth system. Their first signing of the season was of Greg Halford from Charlton Athletic, and their first transfer out of the club when Stephen Elliott moved to Wolverhampton Wanderers. On 13 July 2007, Sunderland signed the former Newcastle United player Michael Chopra from Cardiff City for £5 million and Manchester United midfielder Kieran Richardson on 16 July.

Fellow north east team Darlington was Sunderland's first pre-season friendly, Sunderland won the game 2–0 with goals from Ross Wallace and Anthony Stokes at The Darlington Arena. This was followed up by a shock defeat to Scunthorpe United on 21 July where they were beaten 1–0. Sunderland went on a tour of Ireland, where they would play Bohemians, Cork City and Galway United. They beat Bohemians 1–0 on 28 July thanks to a Stern John goal, but were held to a 1–1 draw at Cork City as Liam Miller scored the Sunderland goal. Their final game of the tour against Galway United ended as a 4–0 win for Sunderland, with goals from Michael Chopra, Kieran Richardson, David Connolly and Stern John. Juventus travelled to the Stadium of Light to commemorate its ten-year anniversary. The game ended 1–1 as Daryl Murphy scored, but the Italian side scored with two minutes remaining to draw the game.

Sunderland signed Dickson Etuhu from Norwich City for £1.5 million on 17 July, and Paul McShane from West Bromwich Albion on 26 July for £2.5 million. With the start of the Premier League season looming, Sunderland broke their transfer record to buy Scottish international goalkeeper Craig Gordon from Heart of Midlothian for £9 million. The club's last signing before the start of the season was Roy O'Donovan from Cork City for an undisclosed fee.

=== August ===
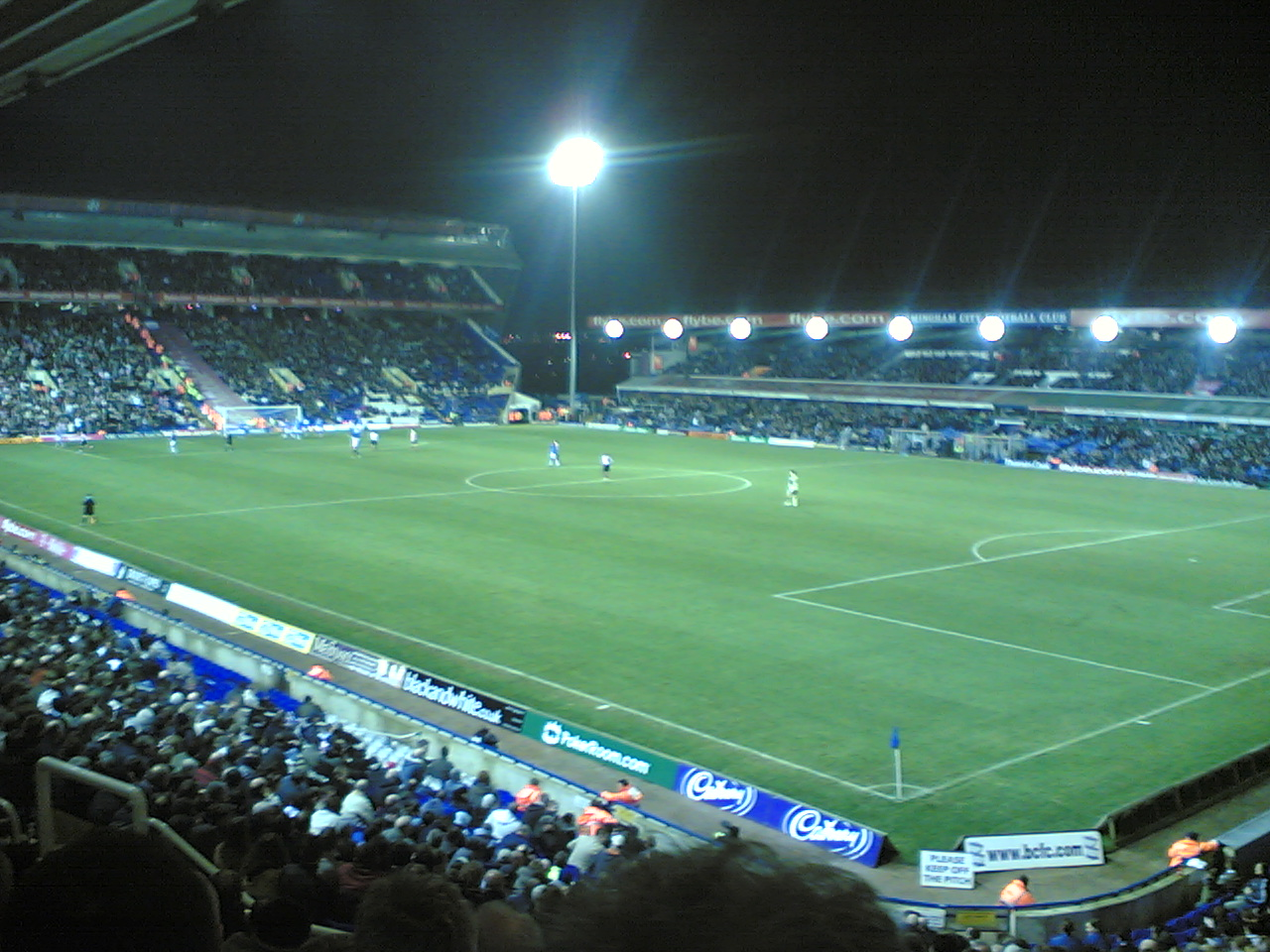
Sunderland playing against Birmingham City on 15 August 2007 at St. Andrews

Sunderland's season started against Tottenham Hotspur on 11 August 2007. Sunderland won the game through a last minute goal from Michael Chopra in front of an attendance of 43,967. Their second game of the season was an away fixture to Birmingham City, a Paul McShane own goal had put Sunderland behind in the 28th minute, but Michael Chopra scored his second goal of the season to equalise. Birmingham took the lead again through Garry O'Connor but Sunderland scored another last minute goal, this time from Stern John to save a point. On 24 August ex Manchester United and Newcastle United striker Andy Cole joined the club on a free transfer from Portsmouth. Sunderland travelled to the JJB Stadium unbeaten on 18 August but lost 3–0 to Wigan Athletic. On 25 September Liverpool beat Sunderland 2–0 to give them their second consecutive defeat. On the same day, Tobias Hysén returned to his native Sweden with IFK Göteborg after he and his wife were suffering from home sickness. Luton Town produced a league cup shock as they beat Sunderland 3–0 at Kenilworth Road. Sunderland signed three more players before the transfer deadline; Ian Harte from Levante on a free transfer, Danny Higginbotham from Stoke City for £3 million, and Kenwyne Jones from Southampton for £6 million with Stern John going in the opposite direction.

=== September ===
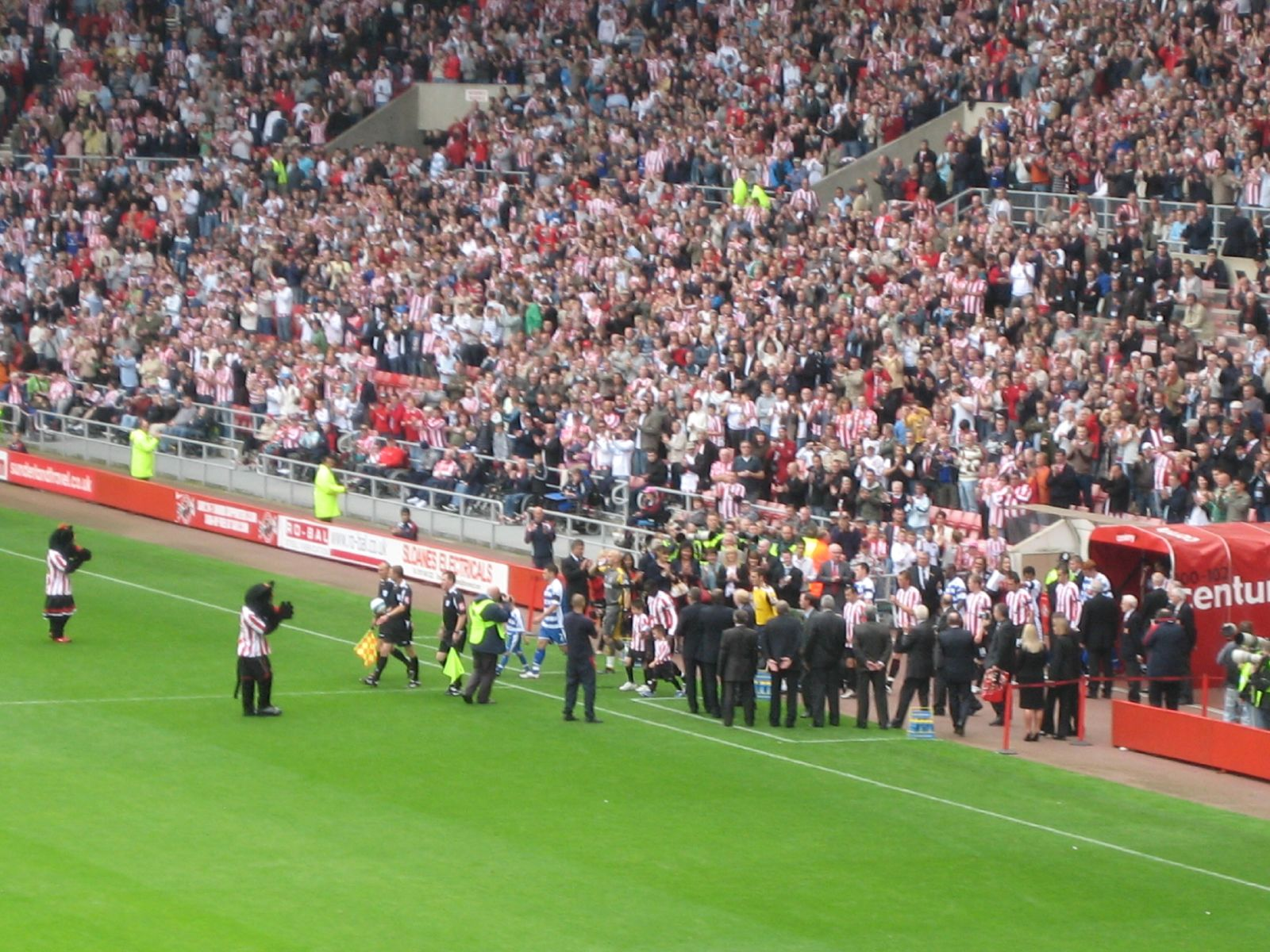
Sunderland paying tribute to 1973 FA Cup Final winning goalscorer Ian Porterfield

Sunderland opened the month with a 1–0 defeat away to Manchester United on 1 September, Louis Saha scored the winner 18 minutes from full-time. Roy Keane said "I'm delighted with the overall performance. It would have been nice to test their goalkeeper a bit more but overall I'm delighted with the players' efforts." about the team's display. Jack Pelter signed for Sunderland on 8 September, from New Zealand team Canterbury United, on a free transfer in an original one-month deal. Two weeks after the defeat to Manchester United, Sunderland beat Reading 2–1 on 15 September. Kenwyne Jones and Ross Wallace scored the Sunderland goals in a game which was overshadowed by the tribute paid to 1973 FA Cup Final scorer Ian Porterfield who died on 11 September 2007. Sunderland met Middlesbrough on 22 September in their first north east derby of the season. Grant Leadbitter scored in the 2nd minute to put Sunderland in front, but two ex-Sunderland players; Julio Arca and Stewart Downing put Middlesbrough into the lead. Liam Miller scored an 89th minute volley to save a point for Sunderland. Grant Leadbitter scored his second goal in as many games on 29 September as Blackburn Rovers beat Sunderland 2–1.

=== October ===
October started with an away fixture against Arsenal at the Emirates Stadium on 7 October. Sunderland went 2–0 down within the first 14 minutes. However, Sunderland levelled the score at 2–2 with goals from Ross Wallace on the 25th minute and Kenwyne Jones on the 48 minute. Arsenal won the game 3–2 after a late Robin van Persie goal. Sunderland suffered back-to-back defeats when they lost 3–1 away to West Ham United on 21 October. Kenwyne Jones got the goal for Sunderland. Fulham came to the Stadium of Light on 27 October, Fulham took the lead in the 32nd minute with a 30-yard free kick from Simon Davies. Sunderland snatched a point when Kenywyne Jones scored an 86th-minute equaliser. The wearsiders had gone down to ten men in the 67th minute when Greg Halford was sent off.

=== November ===
Sunderland lost 1–0 away to Manchester City on 5 November after a goal from Stephen Ireland. Manager, Roy Keane, expressed his frustration in a post match interview saying "We didn't deserve anything. I don't feel we did enough to get anything out of the game. I don't think their keeper had too many saves to make, did he?". 10 November was the first Tyne–Wear derby of the season. Danny Higginbotham put Sunderland into the lead shortly after half time, but James Milner drew Newcastle level on the 68th minute after his cross beat goalkeeper Craig Gordon into the far post. Sunderland had a chance to win the game when ex-Newcastle forward Michael Chopra headed against the bar minutes from full-time. Sunderland ended the month on a low as they were beaten 7–1 away to Everton on 24 November. Dwight Yorke scored Sunderland's only goal just before half time. Roy Keane said "It's hard to take, but we lose as a team and I picked the team and sorted the tactics so I have no problem taking responsibility for what happened."

=== December ===
On 1 December Sunderland beat Derby County 1–0. The defeat against Everton led to Craig Gordon being dropped from the side. He was replaced by Darren Ward who made a save to push Kenny Miller's strike onto the post. With the game looking to be heading towards a draw, Anthony Stokes scrambled to ball in to win the game. On 8 December Sunderland travelled to Stamford Bridge to play Chelsea. Sunderland went behind in the 23rd minute through an Andriy Shevchenko goal. Chelsea won the game 2–0 after Liam Miller was sent off whilst giving a penalty away, which Frank Lampard scored. Sunderland played Aston Villa on 15 December, Danny Higginbotham put Sunderland ahead with a 10th-minute header. Villa midfielder Shaun Maloney equalised when he scored from a 71st minute free kick. Sunderland could have won the game late on, but Danny Collins' header was ruled out by referee Steve Bennett for a foul. Roy Keane displayed his annoyance at Bennett saying "It sums up (the referee's) day. He was giving everything against us and to say we're disappointed would be an unbelievable understatement. You could sense he was waiting to blow his whistle. It would be nice to see him later."

Reading reversed their defeat to Sunderland previously in the season by winning 2–1 on 22 December. Reading had led 1–0 after a 69th-minute goal from Ívar Ingimarsson. Michael Chopra levelled the match by scoring an 82nd-minute penalty. A goal by Stephen Hunt in the 90th minute sparked controversy as it appeared not to have crossed the line. Sunderland met Manchester United on Boxing Day at the Stadium of Light, they were beaten 4–0 in a game were Sunderland striker Martyn Waghorn made the step up from the club's Youth system to the first team. Martyn Waghorn promoted to first team from Youth system. Sunderland ended 2007 with a 3–1 home win to Bolton Wanderers on 29 December, Kieran Richardson, Kenwyne Jones and Daryl Murphy were the scorers.

=== January ===
Sunderland began the new year with a 1–0 away loss to Blackburn Rovers on 1 January. Dean Whitehead had the chance to put Sunderland in the lead, but missed his penalty kick. Minutes later, Blackburn won a penalty of their own; Benni McCarthy converted the penalty before Dwight Yorke was sent off late on. Jonny Evans returned to Sunderland on loan for the second time for the remainder of season from Manchester United. Sunderland met Wigan Athletic in the FA Cup third round as they lost 3–0 on 5 January. On 12 January Kieran Richardson scored a double to beat Portsmouth 2–0 at the Stadium of Light. Sunderland made their first permanent signing of the January transfer window when Frenchman Jean-Yves Mvoto signed from Paris Saint-Germain on 15 January for an undisclosed fee. Mvoto said "This is a big opportunity for me, I'm pleased to be at Sunderland."

On 19 January Sunderland played Tottenham Hotspur. An early Aaron Lennon goal saw Spurs take the lead, and Robbie Keane's 100th goal for the club in the 90th minute won the game for Tottenham at White Hart Lane. Phil Bardsley signed for the club on 22 January from Manchester United for £2 million, the next day Rade Prica also signed for the club, from AaB Aalborg for £2 million. New signing Rade Prica scored a goal on his debut for Sunderland to wrap up a 2–0 win at home to Birmingham City on 29 January. Daryl Murphy scored the first goal in the 15th minute. Andy Reid signed for the club on the last day of the January transfer window deadline from Charlton Athletic for £4 million.

=== February ===
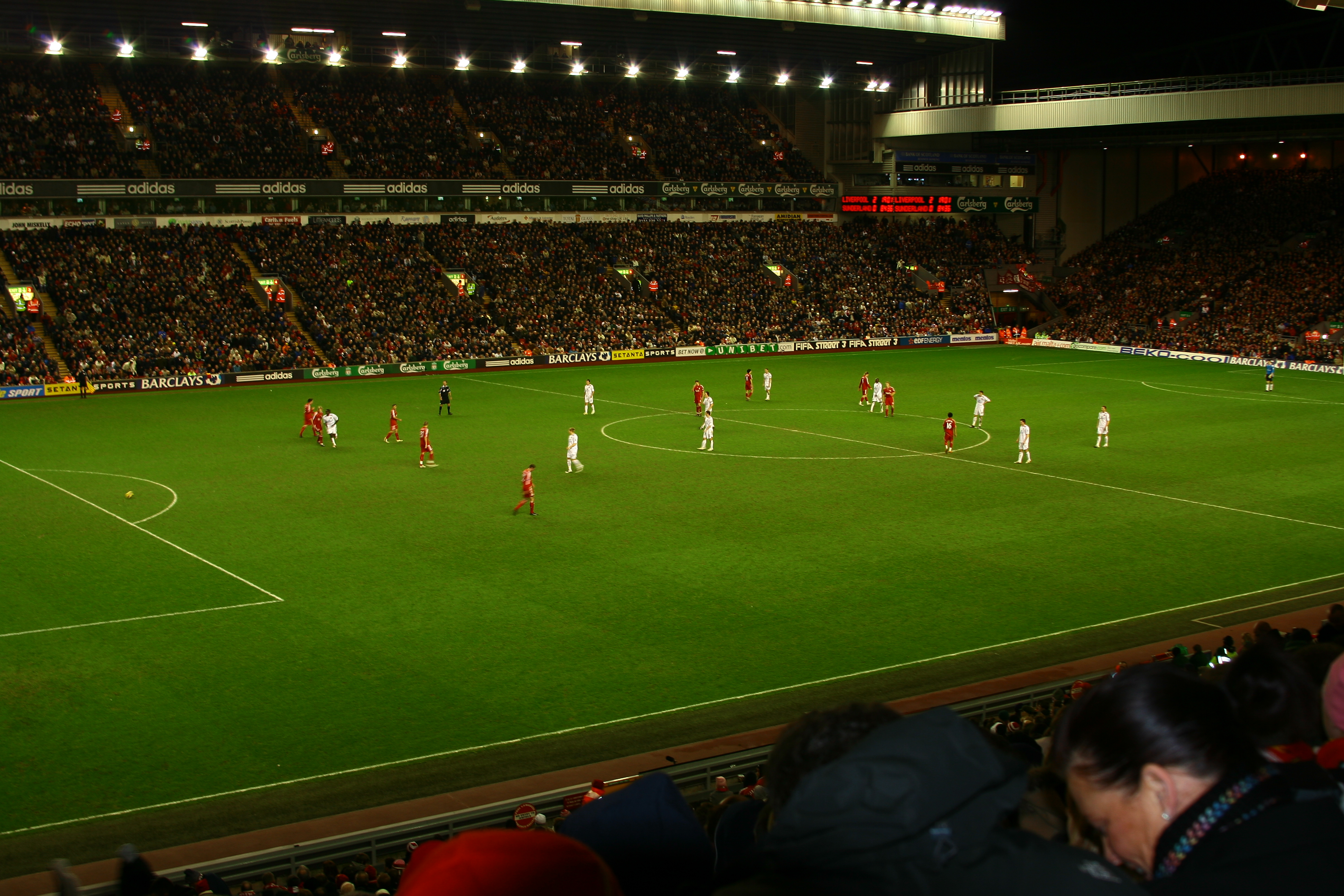
Sunderland playing against Liverpool at Anfield

Sunderland had a poor start to the month, as they lost 3–0 away to Liverpool on 2 February. They had two penalty appeals turned down, prompting Roy Keane to comment, "We felt they were penalties. But I didn't feel we were going to get those decisions today." Following a recent heart attack in a League Cup game between Leicester City and Nottingham Forest, Clive Clarke had his Sunderland contract terminated on 5 February due to the event while on loan at Leicester. Sunderland bounced back from the defeat to Liverpool with a 2–0 win against Wigan Athletic on 9 February. Dickson Etuhu put them in the lead before Daryl Murphy scored a 25-yard strike in off the bar. Sunderland, however, lost their next game 1–0 to Portsmouth on 23 February at Fratton Park.

=== March ===
On 1 March Sunderland drew 0–0 away to Derby County. Michael Chopra could have put the team in the lead, only for it to be ruled out for offside. Sunderland's manager said, "He [Chopra] was clearly onside and we are always told that the advantage goes with the attacking player." An Andrew Johnson goal on the verge of half time helped Everton to a 1–0 win at the Stadium of Light on 8 March. Sunderland lost consecutive games when Chelsea beat them 1–0 on 15 March due to a Didier Drogba goal. Andy Reid came close to putting Sunderland in front as his free kick was plucked from the top corner by Carlo Cudicini. Sunderland's first away win of the season came on 22 March when they won 1–0 at Villa Park against Aston Villa. An 83rd minute Michael Chopra scored the winning goal for Sunderland. A 2–1 win at home to West Ham United on 29 March helped Sunderland to their first consecutive wins of the season. Kenwyne Jones' first goal since late December levelled the score at 1–1 and a 95th minute Andy Reid goal won the game.

=== April ===
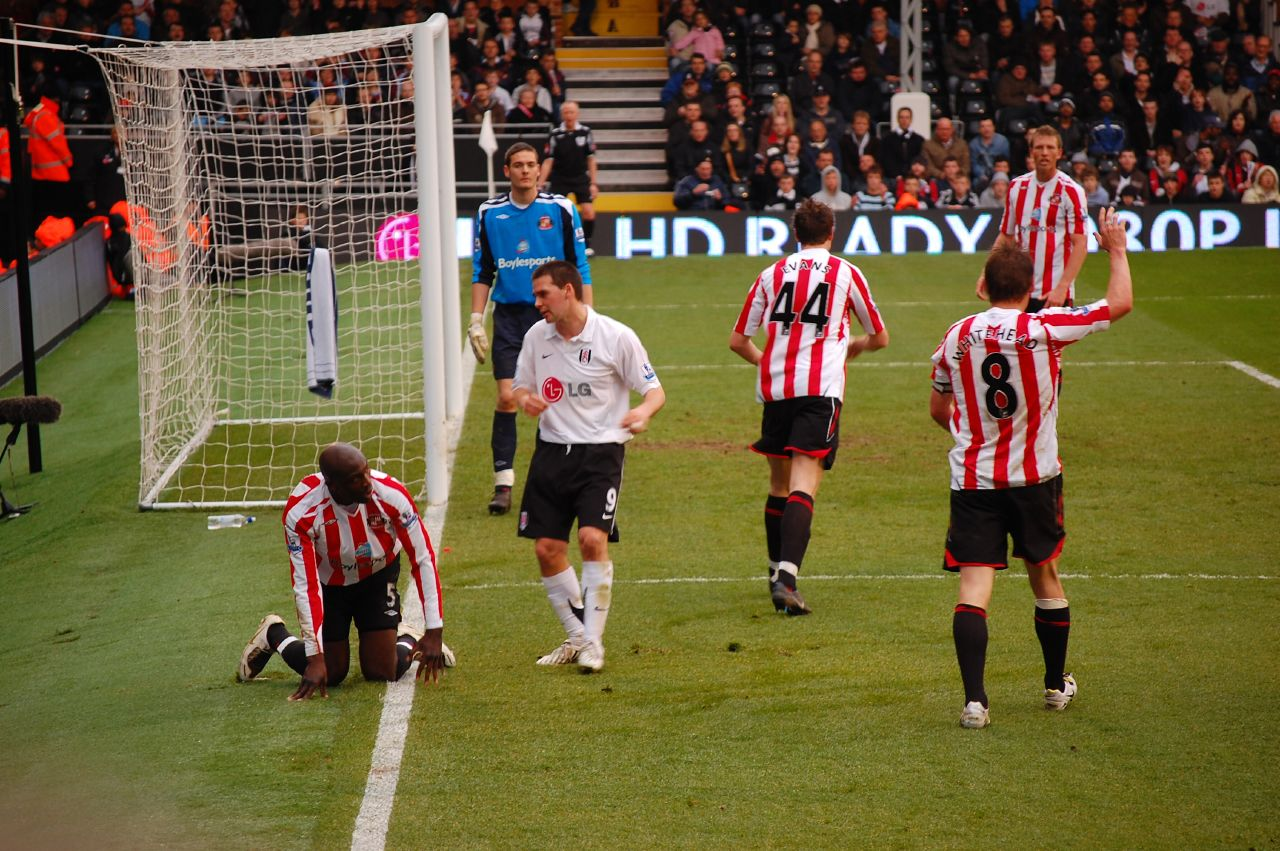
Sunderland taking on Fulham at Craven Cottage, where they won 3–1

A 3–1 away win to Fulham on 5 April helped Sunderland to nine points in three games, as goals came from Danny Collins, Michael Chopra and Kenwyne Jones. They lost 2–1 at home to Manchester City on 12 April. Manchester City were awarded a dubious penalty given by Mike Riley, and Elano converted it in the 79 minute. Dean Whitehead equalised with a near post volley after Andy Reid crossed the ball. Manchester City, however, still had time to win the game and Darius Vassell scored an 89th minute scuffed shot to beat Craig Gordon. On the return fixture of the Tyne and Wear derby on 19 April Sunderland were defeated 2–0 away to Newcastle United. The next game was another derby for Sunderland, this time the Tees–Wear derby on 26 April. Sunderland won the game 3–2 at home to Middlesbrough, with goals from Danny Higginbotham, Michael Chopra and an Emanuel Pogatetz own goal, thus securing their safety and staying in the Premier League.

=== May ===
After ensuring their own safety, Sunderland travelled to Bolton Wanderers on 3 May, who were not yet safe from relegation. Sunderland lost the game 2–0 at the Reebok Stadium. On 11 May, the last game of the Premier League season, Sunderland played Arsenal at the Stadium of Light. Arsenal won the game 1–0 through a Theo Walcott goal. Sunderland also recorded their highest home attendance of the season, when the match was watched by 47,802 people. Sunderland finished the season with 39 points in 15th place, with Kenwyne Jones as top goal scorer with seven goals. Left-back Danny Collins was named as Sunderland's player of the season, while on-loan centre-back Jonny Evans was named as the club's young player of the season for the second season running. They finished with an average home attendance of 42,728 which was the fifth highest in the league.

== Match results ==
=== Legend ===
Win	Draw	Loss

=== Pre-season ===
Game	Date	Opponent	Venue	Result	Attendance	Goalscorers	Notes
1	18 July 2007	Darlington	Away	2–0	9,500	Wallace, Stokes	
2	21 July 2007	Scunthorpe United	Away	0–1	5,388		
3	28 July 2007	Bohemian	Away	1–0	5,033	John	
4	30 July 2007	Cork City	Away	1–1	9,000	Miller	
5	1 August 2007	Galway United	Away	4–0	5,000	Chopra, Richardson, Connolly, John	
6	4 August 2007	Juventus	Home	1–1	25,852	Murphy	

=== Premier League ===
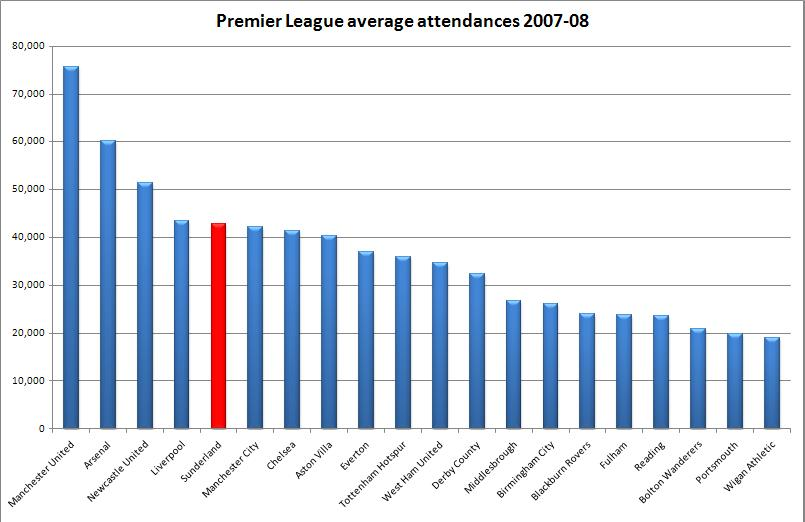
Sunderland recorded the fifth highest average attendance during the 2007–08 Premier League season.

==== League table ====
Pos	Team	Pld	W	D	L	GF	GA	GD	Pts
13	Middlesbrough	38	10	12	16	43	53	−10	42
14	Wigan Athletic	38	10	10	18	34	51	−17	40
15	Sunderland	38	11	6	21	36	59	−23	39
16	Bolton Wanderers	38	9	10	19	36	54	−18	37
17	Fulham	38	8	12	18	38	60	−22	36

Source: Barclays Premier League
Rules for classification: 1) points; 2) goal difference; 3) number of goals scored.
For further information on European qualification see Premier League – Competition

==== Results summary ====
Overall								Home						Away					
Pld	W	D	L	GF	GA	GD	Pts	W	D	L	GF	GA	GD	W	D	L	GF	GA	GD
38	11	6	21	36	59	−23	39	9	3	7	23	21	+2	2	3	14	13	38	−25

Last updated: 4 December 2018.
Source: 11v11

==== Results per matchday ====
Matchday	1	2	3	4	5	6	7	8	9	10	11	12	13	14	15	16	17	18	19	20	21	22	23	24	25	26	27	28	29	30	31	32	33	34	35	36	37	38
Ground	H	A	A	H	A	H	A	H	A	A	H	A	H	A	H	A	H	A	H	H	A	H	A	H	A	H	A	A	H	H	A	H	A	H	A	H	A	H
Result	W	D	L	L	L	W	D	L	L	L	D	L	D	L	W	L	D	L	L	W	L	W	L	W	L	W	L	D	L	L	W	W	W	L	L	W	L	L
Position	6	4	8	14	17	14	13	15	16	16	15	15	15	18	14	15	17	18	19	17	18	18	18	14	16	14	15	15	16	16	16	13	13	14	15	13	15	15

Source: Statto.com
A = Away; H = Home; W = Win; D = Draw; L = Loss

Game	Date	Opponent	Venue	Result	Attendance	Goalscorers	Notes
1	11 August 2007	Tottenham Hotspur	Home	1–0	43,967	Chopra	
2	15 August 2007	Birmingham City	Away	2–2	24,898	Chopra, John	
3	18 August 2007	Wigan Athletic	Away	0–3	18,639		
4	25 August 2007	Liverpool	Home	0–2	45,645		
5	1 September 2007	Manchester United	Away	0–1	75,648		
6	15 September 2007	Reading	Home	2–1	39,272	Jones, Wallace	
7	22 September 2007	Middlesbrough	Away	2–2	30,675	Leadbitter, Miller	
8	29 September 2007	Blackburn Rovers	Home	1–2	41,252	Leadbitter	
9	7 October 2007	Arsenal	Away	2–3	60,098	Jones, Wallace	
10	21 October 2007	West Ham United	Away	1–3	34,913	Jones	
11	27 October 2007	Fulham	Home	1–1	39,392	Jones	
12	5 November 2007	Manchester City	Away	0–1	40,038		
13	10 November 2007	Newcastle United	Home	1–1	47,701	Higginbotham	
14	24 November 2007	Everton	Away	1–7	38,594	Yorke	
15	1 December 2007	Derby County	Home	1–0	42,380	Stokes	
16	8 December 2007	Chelsea	Away	0–2	41,707		
17	15 December 2007	Aston Villa	Home	1–1	43,248	Higginbotham	
18	22 December 2007	Reading	Away	1–2	24,082	Chopra (pen)	
19	26 December 2007	Manchester United	Home	0–4	47,360		
20	29 December 2007	Bolton Wanderers	Home	3–1	42,058	Richardson, Jones, Murphy	
21	2 January 2008	Blackburn Rovers	Away	0–1	23,212		
22	12 January 2008	Portsmouth	Home	2–0	37,369	Richardson (2)	
23	19 January 2008	Tottenham Hotspur	Away	0–2	36,070		
24	29 January 2008	Birmingham City	Home	2–0	37,674	Murphy, Prica	
25	2 February 2008	Liverpool	Away	0–3	43,244		
26	9 February 2008	Wigan Athletic	Home	2–0	43,600	Etuhu, Murphy	
27	23 February 2008	Portsmouth	Away	0–1	20,139		
28	1 March 2008	Derby County	Away	0–0	33,058		
29	9 March 2008	Everton	Home	0–1	42,595		
30	15 March 2008	Chelsea	Home	0–1	44,679		
31	22 March 2008	Aston Villa	Away	1–0	42,640	Chopra	
32	29 March 2008	West Ham United	Home	2–1	45,690	Jones, Reid	
33	5 April 2008	Fulham	Away	3–1	25,053	Collins, Chopra, Jones	
34	12 April 2008	Manchester City	Home	1–2	46,797	Whitehead	
35	20 April 2008	Newcastle United	Away	0–2	52,305		
36	26 April 2008	Middlesbrough	Home	3–2	45,059	Higginbotham, Chopra, Pogatetz (o.g.)	
37	3 May 2008	Bolton Wanderers	Away	0–2	25,053		
38	11 May 2008	Arsenal	Home	0–1	47,802		

=== FA Cup ===
Round	Date	Opponent	Venue	Result	Attendance	Goalscorers	Notes
3	5 January 2008	Wigan Athletic	Home	0–3	20,821		

=== League Cup ===
Round	Date	Opponent	Venue	Result	Attendance	Goalscorers	Notes
2	27 August 2007	Luton Town	Away	0–3	4,401		

== Player details ==
No.	Pos.	Name	League		FA Cup		League Cup		Total		Discipline	
No.	Pos.	Name	Apps	Goals	Apps	Goals	Apps	Goals	Apps	Goals	Yellow card	Red card
1	GK	Craig Gordon	34	0	1	0	0	0	35	0	1	0
2	DF	Greg Halford	8	0	0	0	1	0	9	0	1	2
3	DF	Ian Harte	3 (5)	0	0	0	0	0	3 (5)	0	0	0
4	MF	Dickson Etuhu	18 (2)	1	0	0	1	0	19 (2)	1	5	0
5	DF	Nyron Nosworthy	29	0	1	0	1	0	31	0	3	0
6	DF	Paul McShane	20 (1)	0	1	0	0	0	21 (1)	0	4	1
7	MF	Carlos Edwards	11 (2)	0	0	0	0	0	11 (2)	0	0	0
8	MF	Dean Whitehead	27	1	1	0	0	0	28	1	7	0
9	FW	Anthony Stokes	8 (12)	1	0	0	1	0	9 (12)	1	1	0
10	MF	Kieran Richardson	15 (2)	3	1	0	0	0	16 (2)	3	3	0
11	FW	Daryl Murphy	20 (8)	3	1	0	1	0	22 (8)	3	2	0
12	MF	Liam Miller	16 (8)	1	0	0	1	0	17 (8)	1	4	1
13	GK	Darren Ward	3	0	0	0	1	0	4	0	0	0
14	FW	Stern John	0 (1)	1	0	0	0	0	0 (1)	1	0	0
14	DF	Danny Higginbotham	21	3	0	0	0	0	21	3	1	0
15	DF	Danny Collins	32 (4)	1	1	0	0	0	33 (4)	1	6	0
16	FW	Michael Chopra	21 (12)	6	0	0	1	0	22 (12)	6	7	0
17	FW	Kenwyne Jones	33	7	0	0	0	0	33	7	2	0
18	MF	Grant Leadbitter	17 (14)	2	0 (1)	0	1	0	18 (15)	2	5	0
19	FW	Dwight Yorke	17 (3)	1	0	0	0 (1)	0	17 (4)	1	4	1
20	FW	Andy Cole	3 (4)	0	0 (1)	0	0	0	3 (5)	0	0	0
20	MF	Andy Reid	11 (2)	1	0	0	0	0	11 (2)	1	0	0
21	DF	Russell Anderson	0 (1)	0	0	0	1	0	1 (1)	0	0	0
22	DF	Clive Clarke	0	0	0	0	0	0	0	0	0	0
23	FW	Roy O'Donovan	4 (13)	0	1	0	0 (1)	0	5 (14)	0	2	0
24	GK	Trevor Carson	0	0	0	0	0	0	0	0	0	0
25	DF	Jean-Yves Mvoto	0	0	0	0	0	0	0	0	0	0
26	DF	Jack Pelter	0	0	0	0	0	0	0	0	0	0
26	DF	Phil Bardsley	11	0	0	0	0	0	11	0	3	0
27	DF	Stanislav Varga	0	0	0	0	0	0	0	0	0	0
28	MF	Graham Kavanagh	0	0	1	0	0	0	1	0	0	0
29	DF	Peter Hartley	0	0	0	0	0	0	0	0	0	0
30	MF	Jake Richardson	0	0	0	0	0	0	0	0	0	0
31	FW	David Connolly	1 (2)	0	0 (1)	0	0 (1)	0	1 (4)	0	1	0
32	GK	Márton Fülöp	1	0	0	0	0	0	1	0	0	0
33	MF	Ross Wallace	18 (3)	2	0	0	1	0	19 (2)	2	4	0
34	MF	Billy Dennehy	0	0	0	0	0	0	0	0	0	0
35	DF	Michael Kay	0	0	0	0	0	0	0	0	0	0
36	DF	Gavin Donoghue	0	0	0	0	0	0	0	0	0	0
37	MF	Robbie Weir	0	0	0	0	0	0	0	0	0	0
38	MF	Jamie Chandler	0	0	0	0	0	0	0	0	0	0
39	FW	Martyn Waghorn	1 (2)	0	0	0	0	0	1 (2)	0	0	0
40	FW	David Dowson	0	0	0	0	0	0	0	0	0	0
41	DF	Michael Liddle	0	0	0	0	0	0	0	0	0	0
42	MF	Jordan Henderson	0	0	0	0	0	0	0	0	0	0
43	MF	Conor Hourihane	0	0	0	0	0	0	0	0	0	0
44	DF	Jonny Evans	15	0	1	0	0	0	16	0	0	0
45	FW	Rade Prica	0 (6)	1	0	0	0	0	0 (6)	1	0	0
—	MF	Tobias Hysén	0	0	0	0	0	0	0	0	0	0

== Transfers ==
=== In ===
Date	Pos	Name	From	Fee	Notes
17 May 2007	MF	Robbie Weir	Youth system	–	
17 May 2007	MF	Jamie Chandler	Youth system	–	
17 May 2007	FW	David Dowson	Youth system	–	
11 June 2007	DF	Greg Halford	Reading	£3 million	
27 June 2007	DF	Russell Anderson	Aberdeen	£1 million	
13 July 2007	FW	Michael Chopra	Cardiff City	£5 million	
16 July 2007	MF	Kieran Richardson	Manchester United	Undisclosed	
17 July 2007	MF	Dickson Etuhu	Norwich City	£1.5 million	
26 July 2007	DF	Paul McShane	West Bromwich Albion	£2.5 million	
7 August 2007	GK	Craig Gordon	Heart of Midlothian	£9 million	
9 August 2007	FW	Roy O'Donovan	Cork City	Undisclosed	
24 August 2007	FW	Andy Cole	Portsmouth	Free	
29 August 2007	DF	Ian Harte	Levante	Free	
29 August 2007	DF	Danny Higginbotham	Stoke City	£3 million	
29 August 2007	FW	Kenwyne Jones	Southampton	£6 million	
8 September 2007	DF	Jack Pelter	Canterbury United	Free	
26 December 2007	FW	Martyn Waghorn	Youth system	–	
15 January 2008	DF	Jean-Yves Mvoto	Paris Saint-Germain	Undisclosed	
22 January 2008	DF	Phil Bardsley	Manchester United	£2 million	
23 January 2008	FW	Rade Prica	AaB Aalborg	£2 million	
31 January 2008	MF	Andy Reid	Charlton Athletic	£4 million	

=== Out ===
Date	Pos	Name	To	Fee	Notes
18 May 2007	DF	Kenny Cunningham	–	Retired	
18 May 2007	MF	Tommy Miller	Ipswich Town	Released	
18 May 2007	MF	William Mocquet	Pau	Released	
18 May 2007	FW	Kevin Smith	Aldershot Town	Released	
19 July 2007	FW	Stephen Elliott	Wolverhampton Wanderers	Undisclosed	
25 August 2007	MF	Tobias Hysén	Göteborg	Undisclosed	
29 August 2007	FW	Stern John	Southampton	Swap deal	
5 February 2008	DF	Clive Clarke	–	Released	

=== Loans in ===
Date	Pos	Name	From	Until	Notes
4 January 2008	DF	Jonny Evans	Manchester United	End of season	

=== Loans out ===
Date	Pos	Name	To	Until	Notes
7 July 2007	MF	Arnau Riera	Falkirk	End of season	
3 August 2007	DF	Stephen Wright	Stoke City	3 January 2008	
15 August 2007	GK	Márton Fülöp	Leicester City	2 January 2008	
15 August 2007	DF	Clive Clarke	Leicester City	Mid-November 2007	
21 September 2007	MF	Graham Kavanagh	Sheffield Wednesday	31 October 2007	
22 November 2007	MF	Billy Dennehy	Accrington Stanley	1 January 2008	
4 January 2008	DF	Stanislav Varga	Burnley	End of season	
29 January 2008	FW	Andy Cole	Burnley	End of season	
31 January 2008	DF	Greg Halford	Charlton Athletic	End of season	
31 January 2008	MF	Graham Kavanagh	Sheffield Wednesday	End of season	
19 February 2008	DF	Russell Anderson	Plymouth Argyle	End of season	
21 February 2008	FW	David Dowson	Chesterfield	21 March 2008	
21 February 2008	DF	Peter Hartley	Chesterfield	21 March 2008	
22 February 2008	GK	Márton Fülöp	Stoke City	26 February 2008	

== See also ==
- 2007–08 in English football
