= Danny Collins (footballer) =

Wales international footballer (born 1980)

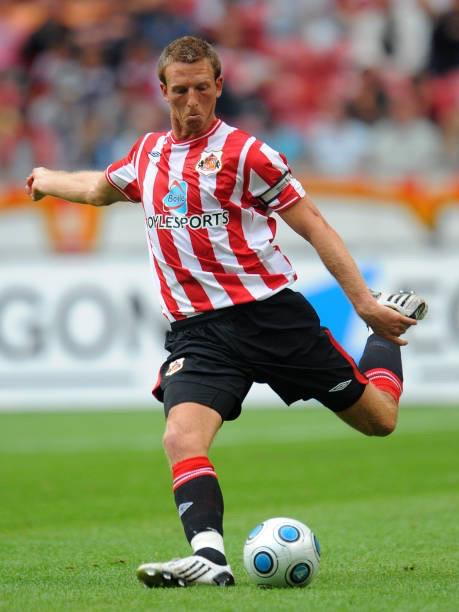
- Collins playing for Sunderland in 2009

Personal information
- Full name: Daniel Lewis Collins
- Date of birth: 6 August 1980 (age 46)
- Place of birth: Chester, England
- Height: 1.90 m (6 ft 3 in)
- Positions: Centre back; left back

Youth career
- 1994: Mold Alexandra
- 1995: Buckley Town
- 1996–2000: Chester City

Senior career*
Years	Team	Apps	(Gls)
2001–2004	Chester City	71	(4)
2002–2003	→ Vauxhall Motors (loan)	18	(2)
2004–2009	Sunderland	149	(3)
2009–2012	Stoke City	50	(0)
2011	→ Ipswich Town (loan)	16	(3)
2012	→ West Ham United (loan)	11	(1)
2012–2015	Nottingham Forest	71	(2)
2015–2016	Rotherham United	24	(2)
2016–2019	Grimsby Town	106	(6)
Total		516	(23)

International career
2003–2004	England C	6	(0)
2005–2011	Wales	12	(0)
- * Club domestic league appearances and goals

Daniel Lewis Collins (born 6 August 1980) is a former professional footballer who played as a centre back.

Collins started his career in the Welsh leagues with Mold Alexandra and Buckley Town before joining Chester City in 1996. His first two seasons at Chester saw him make 20 appearances; during the 2002–03 season he went on loan to non-league side Vauxhall Motors. Following his return to Chester, Collins became a regular in the side and produced some fine performances which attracted the attention of Sunderland who bought him for £140,000. Collins spent five years in the North East making over 150 appearances and earning two promotions to the Premier League during that time. In August 2009 Collins joined Stoke City for £2.75 million and played at left back for the "Potters". After losing his place in the squad he joined Ipswich Town on loan in September 2011 and then West Ham United in March 2012. He signed for Nottingham Forest in July 2012 before having a short stint with Rotherham United from 2015 to 2016. His final club were Grimsby Town where he spent three seasons and became club captain rounding of his spell with the club by making 106 league appearances. He announced his retirement in December 2019 having been released by Grimsby the previous summer.

He has also been capped for England C on six occasions before being called up to the Welsh national side.

== Club career ==
=== Early career ===
He began his career in the Cymru Alliance with local sides Mold Alexandra and Buckley Town. After having trials with Wrexham and Tranmere Rovers, he signed for Chester City in December 2001, who were playing in the Conference. Before turning professional, Collins played cricket for Wales Minor Counties during the football close season. In the 1999 season, he played two matches, taking two wickets at an average of 37.50 and scoring 14 runs at an average of 7.00.

=== Chester City ===
Collins made his debut for Chester in a 3–1 defeat against Northwich Victoria on boxing day 2001. In just under three years he made over 70 appearances for Chester. It was after a successful spell on loan at Vauxhall Motors that his career started to take off, having been converted from an unconvincing forward into a composed central defender. His time at Vauxhalls included helping them surprisingly knock Queens Park Rangers out of the FA Cup in November 2002. The following season saw Collins miss just one game as Chester won the Football Conference title and returned to the Football League after a four-year absence. Although Chester had a mixed start to the 2004–05 season, Collins continued to impress and a stoppage time goal against Macclesfield Town gave Chester their first win of the season on 4 September 2004.

=== Sunderland ===
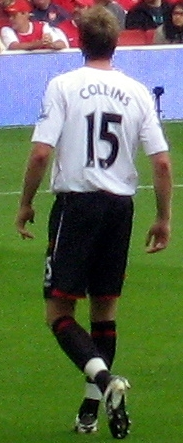
Collins in action for Sunderland

A month later he joined Sunderland for £140,000 amid interest from other clubs including Sheffield United whose manager Neil Warnock hit out at the way Chester handled his transfer to Sunderland. He ended the 2004–05 season with another championship medal and full Welsh caps to his name, he was initially used as a backup player to defenders Gary Breen, Steven Caldwell and George McCartney, in his first season at the club, but still managed to make 14 appearances. Following promotion to the Premier League for the 2005–06 season, Sunderland signed several additional players and Collins found himself out of the first team squad early in the season. He later worked his way into the side but Sunderland endured a nightmare campaign and were comfortably relegated amassing just 15 points.

Collins started the 2006–07 season as first choice defender at Sunderland, but was dropped four games into the season after being booed by a section of the crowd following a mistake in the previous game against Plymouth Argyle. Collins later regained his place following the arrival of manager Roy Keane and won another championship medal come the end of the season. On 15 December Collins scored a late last minute goal against Aston Villa which would have led to the Black Cats victory but referee Steve Bennett denied the goal for a foul on Scott Carson, the foul was not apparent and the goal should have stood. Manager Roy Keane was very angry at the decision and said that Bennett had cheated Sunderland and went as far as to say "the players deserve better."

On 5 April 2008, Collins scored Sunderland's first goal in their 3–1 over Fulham at Craven Cottage despite again having a goal disallowed earlier in the game. He went on to firmly establish himself as a first team regular at Sunderland, starting 32 games in the 2007–08 season. On 30 January 2009, Collins was rewarded with a new two-and-a-half-year contract by Sunderland, keeping him at the club until at least the end of the 2010–11 season. He won the Fans' Player of the Year award in 2008 and 2009.

=== Stoke City ===
On 29 August it was reported that Sunderland had accepted a bid from Stoke City for Collins (despite this, he was an unused substitute when the two sides played each other the next day) As expected, he signed for Stoke on 1 September for £2.75 million rising to £3.5 million. Collins made his Stoke debut in a 2–1 defeat at home to Chelsea in the following match against Bolton Wanderers Stoke were leading up until the 88th minute when Collins fouled Sam Ricketts in the penalty area costing Stoke three points. Collins struggled to establish himself at left back during the 2009–10 season often rotating with Danny Higginbotham.

Collins begun the 2010–11 season in good form and has stated that he needs to keep performing well if he is to hold his left back position."There is a lot of competition here now in every area on the pitch, so the lads who are playing at the moment, like myself, know we have to keep performing. If we don't then there are options there for the manager to change things" However, he again struggled and was dropped back to the bench with Higginbotham and Marc Wilson being preferred at left back.

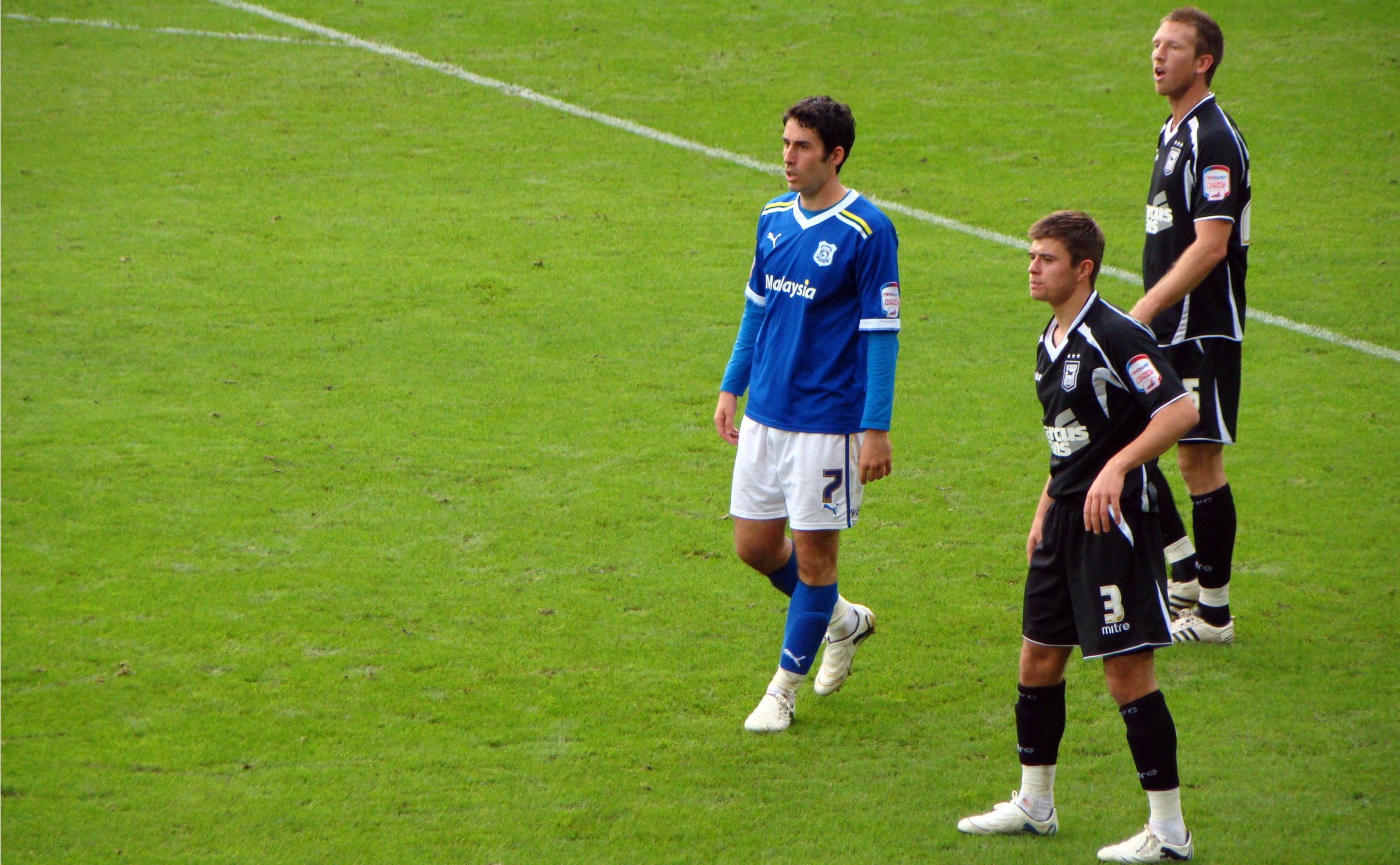
Collins (background) during his time on loan at Ipswich.

Collins was left out Stoke's 25-man Premier League squad by manager Tony Pulis for the 2011–12 season. Collins joined Ipswich Town on a three-month loan deal from Stoke City on 9 September 2011. He played in 16 Championship matches for Ipswich scoring three goals before returning to Stoke. Collins stated that he expected to leave Stoke in the 2012 January transfer window. He did not secure a transfer away from Stoke and made a rare appearance in the fifth round of the FA Cup away at Crawley Town. He also played against Valencia in the UEFA Europa League at the Estadio Mestalla.

On 9 March 2012, Collins joined West Ham United on loan until the end of the 2011–12 season. He made his debut on 10 March in a 1–1 home draw against Doncaster Rovers coming on as an 80th minute substitute for Kevin Nolan. On 17 March Collins scored on his full debut for the "Hammers" in a 1–1 draw against Leeds United.

=== Nottingham Forest ===
Collins joined Football League Championship side Nottingham Forest on 25 July 2012 for an undisclosed fee. He was appointed club captain by manager Sean O'Driscoll. He made his debut for Forest in a 1–0 win against Fleetwood Town in the League Cup on 13 August 2012. Collins played 43 times for Forest during the 2012–13 season which saw them miss out on the play-offs on the final day of the season as they lost 3–2 to rivals Leicester City. The following season, he was succeeded as captain by Chris Cohen.

=== Rotherham United ===
On 3 July 2015 Collins joined Rotherham United on a free transfer. He scored his first goal for Rotherham in the second game of the season, scoring the opening goal in a 2–1 defeat to former club Nottingham Forest.

=== Grimsby Town ===
Having been a free agent for over a month, Collins was snapped up by League Two side Grimsby Town on 12 September 2016 on a 6-month contract. He made his full debut with Grimsby on 24 September 2016, in their 1–0 win at Mansfield Town. He scored his first goal for the club on 19 November 2016 from a corner, he placed a header from close range to take the lead in their 3–0 victory at Plymouth Argyle. Having been ever-present under Paul Hurst and new manager Marcus Bignot, Collins agreed to extend his contract until the end of the season.

Collins agreed to a new one-year deal on 2 June 2017 with the club. He was offered a new contract by Grimsby at the end of the 2017–18 season.

Collins suffered a broken arm in the 3rd league game of the 2018–19 season, scans revealed he had fractured his right ulna, he underwent surgery the following Sunday. He sustained the injury after falling awkwardly winning a header in the 3rd minute against Shay McCartan, even though injured he went on to complete the full 90 minutes in a 1–1 home draw against Lincoln City on 18 August 2018.

Collins suffered a thigh strain injury on 20 December 2018 in a 2–1 win over Swindon Town, meaning he would be out until at least January 2019.

He was released by Grimsby at the end of the 2018–19 season. Collins announced his retirement from professional football in December 2019.

== International career ==
Despite being born in England, Collins has represented Wales at international level. He made his debut on 9 February 2005 during a 2–0 win over Hungary in the first match of John Toshack's second spell as Wales' manager. His last cap came on 22 August 2007 during a 1–0 friendly win over Bulgaria. Two months after the match, Collins withdrew from the Wales squad to face Germany and Slovakia in the qualifying round of UEFA Euro 2008. Having previously fallen out with Toshack over being left on the bench during a friendly match with Paraguay in March 2006,

Following the resignation of Toshack and the appointment of Brian Flynn as Wales caretaker manager, Collins, who had not been called up since 2007, was selected in the Wales squad for the UEFA Euro 2012 qualifying matches in October 2010. His first call-up as a Forest player was in the squad to face Belgium and Serbia in the 2014 FIFA World Cup qualifiers. However, Collins turned the call-up down and said, "Playing for Wales has always meant a great deal, it's a massive honour to play for your country, but at my age I feel I would be better served to stay with Forest to train and prepare for the demanding fixtures in the Championship. I'm grateful to Chris [Coleman] for considering me but I feel it's important I focus on Forest now."

== Career statistics ==
Appearances and goals by club, season and competition
Club	Season	League			FA Cup		League Cup		Other		Total	
Club	Season	Division	Apps	Goals	Apps	Goals	Apps	Goals	Apps	Goals	Apps	Goals
Chester City	2001–02	Football Conference	8	0	0	0	—		0	0	8	0
Chester City	2002–03	Football Conference	10	0	0	0	—		2 (Note: Appearances in the Football Conference play-offs)	0	12	0
Chester City	2003–04	Football Conference	41	3	2	0	—		2 (Note: One appearance in the FA Trophy, one in the Football League Trophy)	0	45	3
Chester City	2004–05	League Two	12	1	0	0	1	0	0	0	13	1
Chester City	Total		71	4	2	0	1	0	4	0	78	4
Vauxhall Motors (loan)	2002–03	Northern Premier League	18	2	6	0	—		0	0	24	2
Sunderland	2004–05	Championship	14	0	1	0	0	0	—		15	0
Sunderland	2005–06	Premier League	23	1	2	0	2	0	—		27	1
Sunderland	2006–07	Championship	38	0	1	0	1	0	—		40	0
Sunderland	2007–08	Premier League	36	1	1	0	0	0	—		37	1
Sunderland	2008–09	Premier League	35	1	3	0	3	0	—		41	1
Sunderland	2009–10	Premier League	3	0	0	0	0	0	—		3	0
Sunderland	Total		149	3	8	0	6	0	0	0	163	3
Stoke City	2009–10	Premier League	25	0	5	0	0	0	—		30	0
Stoke City	2010–11	Premier League	25	0	2	0	0	0	—		27	0
Stoke City	2011–12	Premier League	0	0	1	0	0	0	2 (Note: Appearances in the Europa League)	0	3	0
Stoke City	Total		50	0	8	0	0	0	2	0	60	0
Ipswich Town (loan)	2011–12	Championship	16	3	0	0	0	0	—		16	3
West Ham United (loan)	2011–12	Championship	11	1	0	0	0	0	0	0	11	1
Nottingham Forest	2012–13	Championship	40	0	1	0	2	0	—		43	0
Nottingham Forest	2013–14	Championship	23	1	3	0	2	0	—		28	1
Nottingham Forest	2014–15	Championship	8	1	0	0	0	0	—		8	1
Nottingham Forest	Total		71	2	4	0	4	0	—		79	2
Rotherham United	2015–16	Championship	24	2	0	0	2	0	—		26	2
Grimsby Town	2016–17	League Two	36	2	1	0	0	0	0	0	37	2
Grimsby Town	2017–18	League Two	40	4	1	0	1	0	2 (Note: Appearance(s) in EFL Trophy)	0	44	4
Grimsby Town	2018–19	League Two	30	0	2	0	1	0	0	0	33	0
Grimsby Town	Total		106	6	4	0	2	0	2	0	114	6
Career total			516	23	32	0	15	0	8	0	571	23

=== International ===
Wales national team
Year	Apps	Goals
2005	4	0
2007	3	0
2010	2	0
2011	3	0
Total	12	0

== Honours ==
Chester City

- Football Conference: 2003–04

Sunderland

- Football League Championship: 2004–05, 2006–07

Stoke City

- FA Cup runner-up: 2010–11

Individual

- North East Player of the Year: 2009
