= 2010–11 Stoke City F.C. season =

Stoke City
2010–11 season
- Chairman: Peter Coates
- Manager: Tony Pulis
- Stadium: Britannia Stadium
- Premier League: 13th (46 points)
- FA Cup: Runners-up
- League Cup: Fourth round
- Top goalscorer: League: Kenwyne Jones (9); All: Kenwyne Jones; Jonathan Walters (12 each)
- Highest home attendance: 27,566 v Wigan Athletic (22 May 2011)
- Lowest home attendance: 25,019 v West Bromwich Albion (28 February 2011)
- Average home league attendance: 26,858
Home colours	Away colours

The 2010–11 season was Stoke City's third season in the Premier League and the 55th in the top tier of English football.

Stoke spent over £10 million in the summer of 2010 with the arrivals of Jermaine Pennant, Jonathan Walters, Marc Wilson with £8 million spent on forward Kenwyne Jones. Stoke made a bad start to the campaign losing their first three matches against Wolverhampton Wanderers, Tottenham Hotspur, and Chelsea. This was followed by wins over Aston Villa, Newcastle United and Blackburn Rovers. Stoke, however, hit poor form, losing four in a row in October and were knocked out of the League Cup by West Ham United. The club's inconsistency continued as they went through November with three victories and two draws. Poor defeats against Blackpool and Fulham in December prevented Stoke from pulling away from the bottom half of the table.

Stoke started 2011 in poor form, winning three of ten matches which ended with a 3–0 defeat against West Ham which left Stoke just four points above the relegation zone. The team, however, was doing well in the FA Cup after progressing past Cardiff City, Wolverhampton Wanderers and Brighton & Albion, setting up a tie with West Ham United in the quarter-final. A 2–1 victory saw Stoke reach their first FA Cup semi-final since 1972 and also helped them improve their league form. Stoke beat Newcastle United 4–0 and put in good performances against Chelsea and Tottenham before the semi-final against Bolton Wanderers at Wembley. Stoke produced arguably one their greatest ever performances, beating Bolton 5–0 to reach their first FA Cup Final. Stoke played well in the buildup to the final beating Wolves 3–0 and Arsenal 3–1. Stoke's opponents for the 2011 FA Cup Final were Manchester City and they scored the only goal of the contest though Yaya Touré. Stoke ended the season in 13th position with 46 points.

== Pre-season ==
Stoke announced that they will play local non-league sides Nantwich Town, Newcastle Town as well as Championship sides Derby County and Burnley and League One Bristol Rovers. Stoke also announced they will play a friendly against Notts County at Meadow Lane. The match against Burnley will be played at Huddersfield Town's Galpharm Stadium due to Turf Moor having a new pitch installed. Stoke announced that during the clubs week-long pre-season training camp in Austria they will play against the reigning Turkish Süper Lig champions Bursaspor.

Stoke began their pre-season with a 1–0 defeat by Bursaspor on their annual pre-season training camp in Austria; a mistake by goalkeeper Asmir Begović allowed İbrahim Öztürk to head in the only goal. Following their return to England, Stoke sent two teams to play at Nantwich Town and Notts County. The game at Nantwich ended 2–1 to Stoke thanks to two goals for academy graduate Louis Moult, while Jake Sedgemore scored a fine 30-yard free kick as a consolation for the Dabber's. The game at Notts County finished 0–0 with both sides missing good chances, most notably County's Lee Hughes and City's Tuncay. The next game was against local non-league side Newcastle Town, where Stoke won the game 6–0 with goals from Robert Huth, Ricardo Fuller, a hat-trick from Tuncay and a first Stoke goal for Michael Tonge. This was followed up with a 1–0 defeat by Derby County, Chris Porter scoring the only goal after ten minutes.

Stoke then travelled to Huddersfield to play Burnley, where Tuncay opened the scoring after good play by Liam Lawrence. Burnley equalised straight away as Huth brought down former Potters striker Chris Iwelumo in the penalty area allowing Graham Alexander to score from the spot. Stoke were not to be denied and claimed the win thanks to a fine goals by Tonge. Stoke's next opponent was Bristol Rovers and it was again Tuncay who opened the scoring after Rovers keeper Mikkel Andersen failed to keep out his first shot allowing him to tap in. Bristol pulled level five minutes later through Dominic Blizzard before Fuller gave Stoke a 2–1 win on the stroke of half-time with a trademark individual goal. City's final pre-season game saw them draw 0–0 with Conference Premier side Wrexham.

Match	Date	Opponent	Venue	Result	Attendance	Scorers	Report
1	15 July 2010	Bursaspor	A	0–1	200		Report
2	22 July 2010	Nantwich Town	A	2–1	690	Moult (2) 27', 37'	Report
3	22 July 2010	Notts County	A	0–0	2,125		Report
4	24 July 2010	Newcastle Town	A	6–0	3,360	Huth 26', Fuller 63', Tuncay (3) 66', 79', 87', Tonge 71'	Report
5	27 July 2010	Derby County	A	0–1	10,386		Report
6	31 July 2010	Burnley	A	2–1	1,435	Tuncay 52', Tonge 67'	Report
7	3 August 2010	Bristol Rovers	A	2–1	2,249	Tuncay 38', Fuller 45'+1	Report
8	6 August 2010	Wrexham	A	0–0	1,619		Report

== Premier League ==
=== August ===
For the season opener at Wolves, Stoke gave new record signing Kenwyne Jones his debut as the club made a bright start, with Jones hitting the crossbar with a powerful shot. Wolves thought they had scored moments later when David Jones put the ball in the net but referee Lee Probert disallowed the goal for a foul on Thomas Sørensen. Stoke then suffered a major setback when Kenwyne Jones fell awkwardly from a challenge from Jody Craddock forcing him to be replaced by Mamady Sidibé. This seemed to have a negative effect on Stoke as Wolves began to take control of the game and took the lead through a unique David Jones free kick. Wanderers scored a second just moments later with new signing Steven Fletcher scoring a close range header. In the second half Pulis decided to bring off Sidibé and replace him with Tuncay in an attempt to get back into the game. Stoke pulled one back with a powerful header from Abdoulaye Faye, giving themselves some hope. The second goal, however, never came, and Wolves beat Stoke for the first time since 2006.

Stoke gave new signing from Ipswich Jonathan Walters his debut for the first home match of the season against Tottenham. But it was the away side who started the match the strongest and took the lead through Gareth Bale after a goalmouth scramble. City responded quickly and drew level thanks to Ricardo Fuller taking advantage of some static Spurs defending. Stoke were not level for long as Bale scored his second with an unstoppable volley into the top corner of the net. It could have got worse for Stoke as they again failed to contain Bale but his shot was cleared of the line. In the second half Stoke took the game to Spurs and should have scored through Tuncay. Stoke did have the ball across the line in the final few minutes when Walters headed in but referee Chris Foy missed the goal. It got worse for Stoke after it was revealed that Sidibé had snapped an Achilles tendon meaning he missed the rest of the season.

Stoke went into the next match against Chelsea looking to avoid a repeat of the previous season's 7–0 drubbing, and with Chelsea already with two 6–0 wins it looked like it would be a long afternoon for Stoke. Jones recovered from his ankle injury and started up front with Walters and it was City who had the first chance of the match with Walters almost lobbing Petr Čech early on. On ten minutes a clumsy challenge by Shawcross on Florent Malouda gave Lampard the chance to open the scoring but his penalty was poor and easily saved by Sørensen. Chelsea took the lead through Malouda just before half time. Stoke tried to get back into the match with substitute Whelan hitting the crossbar in the second half. However Stoke's chances of pulling level were ended when Sørensen tripped Nicolas Anelka and Didier Drogba sealed a 2–0 win for the "Blues". The defeat meant that Stoke had lost three games in a row, their worst start to a league campaign since the 1986–87 season.

=== September ===
Following the two-week international break Stoke faced Aston Villa on a Monday night still looking for their first points of the season. Prior to kick-off it was revealed that manager Tony Pulis would not be attending the match due to the death of his mother, meaning assistant David Kemp took over. Villa's new manager Gérard Houllier was also not present. City gave a debut to new signing Marc Wilson and Kenwyne Jones played in his first home match. Stoke made a bright start and had several opportunities to take the lead through Jones. However, it was Villa who took the lead against the run of play through Stewart Downing on 35 minutes. Villa then began to dominate and should have scored through Ashley Young but his header fell just wide. After half time manager Tony Pulis returned to the dugouts and he received a standing ovation from the home crowd. Stoke brought on Fuller and new boy Jermaine Pennant in an attempt to get back into the game. The equaliser came on 80 minutes through a trademark header from Jones. It seemed that a draw was to be the final outcome but in the 93rd minute Villa failed to clear a cross from Pennant and Etherington's shot deflected in off Robert Huth to give Stoke the three points.

West Ham United next made the journey to the Potteries still searching for their first points of the season. They were also without manager Avram Grant who was observing the Jewish holy day of Yom Kippur. Stoke gave Jermaine Pennant his first start and it was he who produced the first chance of the match, Huth hitting the post after Robert Green spilled his free kick. Stoke were poor in the first half and it came as no surprise when Scott Parker took advantage to make it 1–0 to the visitors. The "Hammers" could have gone further in front moments later but Frédéric Piquionne's long range shot hit the crossbar. City greatly improved in the second half and equalised through Jones following good work by Walters and Pennant. Stoke pressed for the winning goal and hit the crossbar twice as West Ham held out for a 1–1 draw.

After the win in the League Cup against Fulham Stoke made the long trip north to face Newcastle United at a strange 4.10pm kick off on a Sunday. Stoke gave a surprise start to Salif Diao while Faye and Delap dropped to the bench, these changes seemed to disjoint Stoke as they put in an abject first half performance. Newcastle were awarded a penalty just before half time after Huth fouled Andy Carroll, Kevin Nolan scored to put the "Magpies" in the lead. Stoke improved in the second half and twice hit the woodwork through Jones. Fuller and Delap came on in a bid to pull level but Fuller had to come off moments later with a suspected dislocated shoulder. Jones did find the net on 67 minutes after good work by Etherington and Huth. Eiður Guðjohnsen came on in an attempt to win the match and with 5 minutes remaining Newcastle defender James Perch headed past his own keeper Tim Krul to give Stoke a 2–1 victory. It was the first time since 1976 Stoke had won at St James' Park ironically Stoke's winner that day also came from a Newcastle own goal.

=== October ===
For the first time since the Tottenham match, Stoke finally had a traditional 3:00 pm kick off at home for the visit of Blackburn Rovers. Pennant recovered from his injury and started on the right of midfield while Fuller's injury was not as bad as first feared and he was able to start on the bench. Stoke took the game to Rovers early on and had a number of half chances through Jones and Walters. Australian Brett Emerton came closest for the visitors in the first half but his header was cleared off the line by an alert Ryan Shawcross. Stoke scored the only goal of the match in the 48th minute when Jon Walters coolly beat Paul Robinson one-on-one after being but through by Etherington.

Almost 5,000 Stoke fans made the trip to Bolton after a two-week break. City were the better side in the first 20 minutes, but Bolton took the lead through Lee Chung-yong. Stoke then had a penalty turned down by Peter Walton after Zat Knight handled in the area. Pennant had a free-kick which hit the crossbar as Wanderers went into the break in the lead. Stoke, however, were level soon after as Rory Delap scored a rare goal, tapping in from close range. Pulis brought on Fuller to press for the second goal but had to leave moments later after dislocating his shoulder again. It was Bolton who won the match through Ivan Klasnić as he scored in the 92nd minute via a Steinsson long throw; it was the third match in a row between the two sides Bolton have scored decisive late goals. Klasnić ended his eventful substitute appearance by managing to pick up two yellow cards in two minutes.

There was intense media interest at the next home game against Manchester United due to the Wayne Rooney saga. Man United took the lead after half an hour through a 'backwards header' by Mexican Javier Hernández. Both sides had chances to score the second goal before half time but the visitors went in to the break in front. There was a controversial end to the half when Gary Neville, who had already been booked for one foul on Etherington, brought the winger down again in full flight, referee Andre Marriner didn't decide to show him a second yellow. The Potters were showing plenty of endeavour, but were struggling to create any clearcut chances as they attempted to get back on level terms. But with ten minutes remaining, they equalised in stunning fashion as they scored their first goal in five meetings with Manchester United. Wilson threaded an accurate ball out to the right hand side where Tuncay advanced forward, cut inside onto his left foot and unleashed a powerful shot into the top corner. Stoke, however, could not hold on and Hernández gave the visitors the points.

Stoke had not won at Everton since 1981, with that run continuing with a 1–0 defeat. After an uneventful first half, the second half proved to be a better spectacle. Begović made his first start of the season and Stoke thought they should have gone into the lead through Tuncay. The Turkish international thought he had put the Potters ahead midway through the second half after capitalising on a defensive mistake from Toffees defender Leighton Baines, however his strike was harshly chalked off for an apparent foul on Baines. Despite that, chances continued to come for both sides in what was an exciting second 45 minutes, but it was the hosts who stole all three points thanks to Yakubu, who rifled home from eight-yards after a defensive mistake from Abdoulaye Faye.

=== November ===
Stoke then travelled to Sunderland and again came out on the wrong end of a poor refereeing decision. In the first 45 minutes Stoke were awful and the Black Cats took full advantage with a soft goal scored by £13 million striker Asamoah Gyan. The home side were then awarded a penalty, but Begović managed to keep out Steed Malbranque's effort. In the second half, Stoke were better and thought they scored when Jones headed the ball past Simon Mignolet, but Lee Cattermole stopped the ball with his hand; referee Martin Atkinson did not award either the goal or a penalty. It got even worse for Stoke as Shawcross was sent off for two bookable offences and Gyan scored a deflected goal to give Steve Bruce's team a 2–0 win.

Following five-straight defeats for Stoke, victory against Birmingham City was vital, but history was not on Stoke's side as they have failed to even score past Birmingham for 13 years. With captain Shawcross suspended, Huth was given the armband and Higginbotham made only his second start of the season, while up front Ricardo Fuller also started following his injury problems. For the opening ten minutes, it was the Blues who were the more lively but after that spell, Stoke began to dominate the match. Former Stoke trainee Ben Foster kept Birmingham in the match with a number of fine saves but he was finally beaten just before half time through Huth. Stoke continued to press forward in the second half and again went close through the impressive German. Stoke made it 2–0 in the 71st minute through a trademark solo goal by Fuller. The Jamaican ran from his own half to the visitors penalty area before cutting in and curling a shot past Foster. Birmingham, however, rallied and score twice through Keith Fahey and Cameron Jerome. But Stoke were not to be denied, and with five minutes to play Dean Whitehead scored the winning goal.

Four days later, City took on an improving Liverpool at the Britannia. Stoke however were to quickly take control of the match and only some fine save's from Pepe Reina kept the scores level. Stoke finally went in front just after half time after a Delap long throw caused chaos in the Liverpool defence and Fuller scored his second goal of the week. The Merseyside club were poor throughout and their best effort came from Maxi Rodríguez when his shot was saved by Begović who sat on the ball. Stoke sealed their first league win over Liverpool since 1984 when Pennant put Jones through one on one with Reina and made no mistake. Liverpool's misery was compounded when Lucas Leiva was sent off for two bookable offences.

Stoke then travelled to West Brom looking to keep their impressive run of 1 defeat in 24 matches against the Baggies going. After a dour first half Stoke were awarded a penalty early in the second half when Scott Carson came off his line and fouled Jones, Matthew Etherington made no mistake from the spot to score his first of the season. West Brom came back at Stoke through and went close through Somen Tchoyi before Stoke were given a second penalty when Simon Cox took down Whitehead and substitute Walters sent Carson the wrong way. Stoke gave the scoreline an impressive look when Walters scored his second goal to make it 3–0 to the Potters. The result also gave Stoke two new records: the largest away win in the Premier League and the largest top division away win since 1982, as well as the first time since the 1983–84 season Stoke have won three top-flight matches in a row. Manager Pulis hailed the new records as "A Fantastic Achievement".

Roberto Mancini's Manchester City arrived at Stoke on the back of a 4–1 win away at Fulham and were looking for three points to boost their ambitious title challenge. City dominated the first half though and only some fine goalkeeping from Joe Hart and missed chances from Jones and Fuller kept the scores level. Manchester City were much improved in the second period, with the impressive David Silva causing Stoke's defence problems. The visitors took the lead after 82 minutes when Micah Richards turned Collins and powered in a low shot. Stoke earned a point in the final minute via Etherington, a long kick from Begović was headed on by Jones to Tuncay who back heeled the ball to the winger who made no mistake.

=== December ===
Stoke then travelled to the DW Stadium to take on an injury-hit Wigan in what turned out to be an entertaining affair. Stoke took the lead in the 18th minute via a deflected Huth free kick, only for Danny Collins to slice the ball into his own net ten minutes later. From the Wigan kick-off, however, Stoke reclaimed possession and a fast-flowing move ended with Etherington's third goal is as many games. Wigan then pulled level again just before half-time through a deflected Tom Cleverley strike to end an eventful first half. It was a much quieter contest in the second half, with both sides missing good chances; the match finished in a fair 2–2 draw.

Stanley Matthews was remembered before the first top flight meeting between Stoke and Blackpool since 1972 in what turned out to be a very frustrating match for Stoke. The first half had a number of chances with Fuller and Jones going close while DJ Campbell threatened for the Seasiders. And it was Campbell who scored the only goal of the match just after half time to condemn Stoke to another December defeat. It was Blackpool's first top flight win in the Potteries since 1963.

With the match against Arsenal postponed due to heavy snow, Stoke's next game came against Blackburn on boxing day. It was the first game for new Rovers manager Steve Kean following the surprise sacking of Sam Allardyce. The first half was a quiet affair, with Etherington having the best chance of the half. In the second half, Stoke took control of the match and went in front through Huth. Stoke continued to create chances, with Whitehead and Jones both being denied by Robinson. Rovers were poor and their best chance fell to youngster Grant Hanley. Stoke sealed the win deep into stoppage time after some good link up play with Fuller and Walters set up Marc Wilson to score his first goal for the club.

Struggling Fulham were Stoke's next opponents two days later. Fulham defender Chris Baird opened the scoring after just four minutes when his shot took a wicked deflection off the post. He scored again on ten minutes when his low free-kick deceived Begović and the Stoke defence. Stoke were poor and Fulham were easily able to hold on to their two-goal advantage.

=== January ===
The first match of 2011 saw Stoke take on Everton at the Britannia Stadium. With Huth suspended after picking up five yellow cards, Higginbotham returned to the starting lineup, as did Ricardo Fuller. The opening goal came after 20 minutes after a long ball forward by Shawcross was headed by Jones into the path of Etherington, who beat two Everton defenders to cross the ball in for Jones to head in Stoke's first goal of 2011. Following this, the visitors tried in vain to level going close through Tim Cahill and Steven Pienaar. In the second half, Stoke were put under more pressure, but in the 70th minute Phil Jagielka, under pressure from Fuller, sliced the ball into his own net to give Stoke a 2–0 win. It was the club's first win over the Toffees since 1982.

The first away match of the year was at the league leaders Manchester United. The home side took the lead through Javier Hernández midway through the first half, but Stoke equalised through Whitehead after good play by Tuncay after 50 minutes; it was Stoke's first League goal at Old Trafford since 1980. Nani, however, scored the winner for United. Despite the defeat, manager Pulis stated that his players deserve a lot of credit for their performance.

Bolton arrived at the Britannia Stadium with four-straight away defeats. Stoke were the better side and dominated the play in windy conditions and Wanderers 'keeper Jussi Jääskeläinen pulled off a fine save to deny Jones. The first goal came after 37 minutes when a Tuncay corner was scrambled over the line by Danny Higginbotham. Bolton started the second half the better side with Stuart Holden testing Begović with a free-kick. Stoke made it 2–0 moments later after Etherington was put through one-on-one by Tuncay, only for Zat Knight to mistime his tackle and concede a penalty. Etherington took the spot and the ball went in despite the goalkeeper getting a hand to it. Owen Coyle responded by bringing on two wingers, Martin Petrov and Rodrigo, but his side were unable to get back into the match.

Stoke travelled to London to take on Fulham, with the two sides only having played each other four weeks ago. Stoke produced another very poor performance against the Cottagers, with Clint Dempsey scoring twice and Ryan Shawcross issued a red card. New loan signing John Carew made his Stoke debut in the second half.

=== February ===
Stoke played for the fourth away match in succession at big spending Liverpool in what was the club's 100th Premier League match. Pulis made a number of changes giving rests to key players such as Etherington and Jones while Salif Diao made a surprise start at his old club. In the first half both sides struggled to create many goal scoring chances until the end of the half when Begović was called into making a fine save from Johnson. Liverpool took the lead just after half time when a Gerrard free-kick was deflected into the path of Raul Meireles who put the ball past Begović. Stoke tried to get back into the match, but it was Liverpool's new £22.8 million signing Luis Suárez who sealed the win, despite the best efforts of Andy Wilkinson.

Sunderland were Stoke's next opponents at the Britannia Stadium for an early kick-off. Stoke made an awful start to the match as Kieran Richardson put the Black Cats into the lead after just two minutes. Stoke responded half an hour later as Carew scored his first goal for the club after Craig Gordon miss timed his punch from a Delap throw. Sunderland were back in front just after half time after a long ball was not dealt with by the City defence and Gyan put the ball in the net. Stoke pressed for the equaliser as Sunderland defended stubbornly. With seven minutes remaining a free-kick from Pennant found Huth who poked the ball past Gordon and in the final minute of the game another Pennant set piece was converted by Huth to give Stoke a 3–2 victory.

Stoke then had another away game this time at League Cup finalists Birmingham City at St Andrews. It was a poor match which seemed destined for a 0–0 draw however Birmingham stole the points with the final kick of the match through Nikola Žigić.

After beating Brighton in the FA Cup Stoke travelled to London to face Arsenal in a re-arranged fixture. Stoke made a poor start to the match as the home side almost scored after two minutes as Theo Walcott hit the post. Arsenal did take the lead soon after through defender Sébastien Squillaci, as expected Arsenal controlled the play however Stoke defended well and restricted the Gunners from extending their lead. City were more of a threat in the second half with Pennant, Carew and Huth going close to an equaliser as Stoke were left to rue their slow start to the match.

The match against West Brom was moved to Monday night for live TV coverage, it turned out to be a very disappointing contest. There was little action in the first half with Pennant hitting the crossbar from a freekick the only meaningful attempt on goal. Stoke took the lead through a rare goal from Rory Delap, Baggies substitute Carlos Vela equalised late on. A point was no less than West Brom deserved but they could have had all three had it not been for a fine performance from Begović who saved four shots in the final thirty seconds of the match. Pulis described his team's performance as the worst of the season.

=== March ===
Stoke produced another abject away performance at West Ham and goals from Demba Ba, Manuel da Costa and Thomas Hitzlsperger ensured an easy win for the Hammers. The defeat left Stoke four points above the relegation zone.

After victory in the FA Cup Quarter against West Ham there was great excitement amongst supporters for the important game against Newcastle. Cup hero Danny Higginbotham returned to the starting eleven at the expense of Danny Pugh whilst John Carew was ruled out due to injury. Stoke took the lead just before the half-hour mark Ryan Shawcross laid the ball to Pennant on the right and his cross was glanced in by Jonathan Walters. Newcastle came back strongly and twice came close to equalising and were twice denied by Higginbotham. However Stoke quickly ended the match as a contest after the half time break with two quick goals. The first came after a Steve Harper failed to clear under pressure from Kenwyne Jones and he picked out Matthew Etherington on the left, whose delivery was guided into the net Pennant from about six yards out who scored his first City goal. Newcastle were rattled and they succumbed to a third goal when Higginbotham arrowed in a thunderous free-kick from 20 yards, with Harper rooted to his spot. Shane Ferguson came close to giving the visitors a goal before Ricardo Fuller made it 4–0 in the final minute. It was the first time Stoke had scored four goals in a Premier League match.

=== April ===
Stoke then took on in-form Chelsea for the third home match in a row and made a perfect start. Jonathan Walters took advantage of a hesitant David Luiz to run down the left flank before cutting in past the retreating Michael Essien to send the ball past Petr Čech. Chelsea came back strongly and dominated the match until Didier Drogba equalised through a well placed header. The second half was an entertaining affair with both sides creating chances and playing attacking football. Stoke hit the crossbar through Wilson and Huth whilst Drogba also hit the woodwork twice. Stoke could have won in the final minute when Fuller headed the ball past the impressive Čech but narrowly went wide of the far post. The result was the first point Stoke have claimed off the "Blues" in the Premier League and also ended the Potters' losing streak against the Londoners. After the match it was revealed that Danny Higginbotham has a cruciate knee ligament injury and will miss the rest of the season.

City travelled to White Hart Lane in what was another highly entertaining match despite Stoke's travel problems continuing. After Spurs's heavy UEFA Champions League defeat by Real Madrid they started the match at a high tempo and opened the scoring through Peter Crouch and extended their lead through Luka Modrić. Stoke pulled one back through Etherington, the winger sprinted down the left flank running past two Tottenham defenders before sliding the ball past Gomes. Crouch restored Tottenham's two goal advantage before Kenwyne Jones ended his 13-game goal drought with a thunderous 30-yard strike to make the scoreline 3–2 at half time. In the second period Stoke should have levelled but Walters with an open goal hit his shot against the post and Spurs were able to hang on for the three points.

After the epic 5–0 win over Bolton in the FA Cup Semi-final Stoke returned to league football at Villa Park. Like the match between the two sides earlier in the season Villa were without manager Gérard Houllier who had fallen ill and was admitted to hospital. After a slow start to the match Stoke had a spell of sustained pressure in which Brad Friedel made a number of fine saves before City took the lead through a Jones header from a Delap long throw. Villa levelled just before half time when Kyle Walker crossed in for Darren Bent. The second half was a non-event although Stoke did have the ball in the net twice but both were offside. City had to finish the game with ten men after Fuller was stretchered off after falling awkwardly on his ankle.

Three days later Stoke and Wolves met in the re-arranged Staffordshire derby at the Britannia Stadium. City started the match in the more positive way and went in front when Pennant crossed in for Jones to score his fourth goal in four games. Stoke then suffered another injury as Etherington was stretchered off with a hamstring problem. Wolves goalkeeper Wayne Hennessey made a number of fine saves before Ryan Shawcross scored in first half injury time. Stoke sealed the win five minutes after half time when man of the match Jermaine Pennant's shot took a deflection off Jody Craddock to make it 3–0 to the Potters.

The match against Blackpool at Bloomfield Road was played in windy conditions which made it difficult for both teams to gain an advantage. Stoke had the best chance of the first half when Jones rounded the Blackpool keeper Gilks and had an empty net to aim for but somehow managed to curl his shot beyond the post. City had more chances in the second half with Glenn Whelan the most likely to score whilst Ryan Shotton made his league debut for Stoke. Despite both teams efforts it ended 0–0, Stoke's first scoreless match of the season.

=== May ===
The last match before the FA Cup Final saw Stoke take on Arsenal in what was billed by the media as a grudge match. The Gunners knowing they had to win to keep their fading title hopes alive started well with Robin van Persie going closest. Stoke gradually got into the game and took the lead on the 27th minute when Jermaine Pennant's freekick was run into the net by an unmarked Jones. Five minutes before half-time, Stoke scored again after a mistake by Aaron Ramsey as he gave the ball to Pennant who ran at the Arsenal defence and his shot took a deflection off Johan Djourou and looped over Wojciech Szczęsny. Stoke could have added a third but Walters hit the crossbar from a tight angle. Robert Huth was forced to leave the pitch with a knee injury and Abdoulaye Faye came on to make his first appearance since February. With ten minutes left, Van Persie pulled one back but from the restart, Stoke's Walters scored to seal a 3–1 win.

Following the FA Cup Final defeat by Manchester City, Stoke had the opportunity to gain some revenge three days later. Pulis made five changes and gave a number of fringe player's some game time. Any hope Stoke of gaining something from the match were ended by two moments of class by Carlos Tevez and a header from Joleon Lescott.

Stoke ended a successful season with a disappointing 1–0 defeat at home to Wigan. Hugo Rodallega scored the only goal of the match in the second half to keep Wigan in the Premier League. Stoke finished the season in 13th place due to the loss; had they won, they would have finished in ninth position.

=== Results ===
Match	Date	Opponent	Venue	Result	Attendance	Scorers	Report
1	14 August 2010	Wolverhampton Wanderers	A	1–2	27,850	Faye 55'	Report
2	21 August 2010	Tottenham Hotspur	H	1–2	27,243	Fuller 25'	Report
3	28 August 2010	Chelsea	A	0–2	40,931		Report
4	13 September 2010	Aston Villa	H	2–1	25,899	Jones 80', Huth 90+3'	Report
5	18 September 2010	West Ham United	H	1–1	27,028	Jones 48'	Report
6	26 September 2010	Newcastle United	A	2–1	41,915	Jones 67', Perch 85' (o.g.)	Report
7	2 October 2010	Blackburn Rovers	H	1–0	25,515	Walters 48'	Report
8	16 October 2010	Bolton Wanderers	A	1–2	22,975	Delap 48'	Report
9	24 October 2010	Manchester United	H	1–2	27,372	Tuncay 81'	Report
10	30 October 2010	Everton	A	0–1	35,513		Report
11	6 November 2010	Sunderland	A	0–2	36,541		Report
12	9 November 2010	Birmingham City	H	3–2	26,318	Huth 44', Fuller 71', Whitehead 85'	Report
13	13 November 2010	Liverpool	H	2–0	27,286	Fuller 56', Jones 90+1'	Report
14	20 November 2010	West Bromwich Albion	A	3–0	24,164	Etherington 55' (pen), Walters (2) 85' (pen), 90+3'	Report
15	27 November 2010	Manchester City	H	1–1	27,405	Etherington 90+2'	Report
16	4 December 2010	Wigan Athletic	A	2–2	15,100	Huth 18', Etherington 31'	Report
17	11 December 2010	Blackpool	H	0–1	26,879		Report
18	26 December 2010	Blackburn Rovers	A	2–0	25,440	Huth 51', Wilson 90+3'	Report
19	28 December 2010	Fulham	H	0–2	26,954		Report
20	1 January 2011	Everton	H	2–0	27,418	Jones 23', Jagielka (o.g.) 69'	Report
21	4 January 2011	Manchester United	A	1–2	73,401	Whitehead 50'	Report
22	15 January 2011	Bolton Wanderers	H	2–0	26,809	Higginbotham 37', Etherington 63' (pen)	Report
23	22 January 2011	Fulham	A	0–2	23,766		Report
24	2 February 2011	Liverpool	A	0–2	40,254		Report
25	5 February 2011	Sunderland	H	3–2	26,008	Carew 32', Huth (2) 83', 90+3'	Report
26	12 February 2011	Birmingham City	A	0–1	23,660		Report
27	23 February 2011	Arsenal	A	0–1	60,041		Report
28	28 February 2011	West Bromwich Albion	H	1–1	25,019	Delap 53'	Report
29	5 March 2011	West Ham United	A	0–3	33,066		Report
30	19 March 2011	Newcastle United	H	4–0	27,505	Walters 28', Pennant 46', Higginbotham 49', Fuller 90+2'	Report
31	2 April 2011	Chelsea	H	1–1	27,508	Walters 8'	Report
32	9 April 2011	Tottenham Hotspur	A	2–3	32,702	Etherington 27', Jones 41'	Report
33	23 April 2011	Aston Villa	A	1–1	35,235	Jones 20'	Report
34	26 April 2011	Wolverhampton Wanderers	H	3–0	27,030	Jones 16', Shawcross 45+2', Pennant 51'	Report
35	30 April 2011	Blackpool	A	0–0	16,003		Report
36	8 May 2011	Arsenal	H	3–1	27,478	Jones 28', Pennant 40', Walters 82'	Report
37	17 May 2011	Manchester City	A	0–3	45,103		Report
38	22 May 2011	Wigan Athletic	H	0–1	27,566		Report

=== Final league table ===
Pos	Team	Pld	W	D	L	GF	GA	GD	Pts	Qualification or relegation
11	West Bromwich Albion	38	12	11	15	56	71	−15	47	
12	Newcastle United	38	11	13	14	56	57	−1	46	
13	Stoke City	38	13	7	18	46	48	−2	46	Qualification for the Europa League third qualifying round (Note: Stoke City qualified for the third qualifying round of the Europa League as FA Cup runners-up to Champions League-qualified Manchester City.)
14	Bolton Wanderers	38	12	10	16	52	56	−4	46	
15	Blackburn Rovers	38	11	10	17	46	59	−13	43	

Source: Barclays Premier League
Rules for classification: 1) points; 2) goal difference; 3) number of goals scored.

== FA Cup ==
Stoke were drawn at home against Football League Championship high flyers Cardiff City in the Third round. Pulis made seven changes from the defeat at Manchester United with the likes of Sørensen, Higginbotham, Whelan and Ryan Shotton coming into the starting eleven. Cardiff scored the first after eight minutes through Michael Chopra. After this Stoke tried to level but were frustrated with Marc Wilson hitting the crossbar with a long range free-kick but Stoke did level in the final minute of the half through Tuncay. In the second half Stoke dominated the match and had a number of chances to win the tie but Cardiff held on for a replay.

For the replay Pulis fielded a largely reserve side with rare run outs for a few players. It became a poor and scrappy game with few chances on goal and after 90 minutes the scores were still level. However, in the first minute of extra time Walters converted a Michael Tonge corner to put Stoke in front. Stoke then dominated the remainder of extra time and Walters sealed the win sliding the ball past Tom Heaton from a tight angle. Stoke drew Staffordshire rivals Wolverhampton Wanderers in the fourth round after they won their replay with Doncaster Rovers 5–0.

The match against Wolves was a lethargic affair but 'came alive' in the final ten minutes as Robert Huth put the "Potters" into the lead through a trademark powerful header. On 90 minutes, Wolves were awarded a soft penalty and Serbian Nenad Milijaš had the chance to save Wolves, but Sørensen saved his spot kicked and Stoke secured their place in the fifth round. It was the first time ever that Stoke had beaten Wolves in the FA Cup after eight failed attempts. Stoke were drawn at home to run-away League One leaders Brighton & Hove Albion in the next round.

Stoke produced a commanding performance against a Brighton side who were no match for City's aerial threat. Stoke took the lead though Carew's flicked header from a Delap throw. The second came soon after following good wing play between Pennant and Wilson who crossed the ball in for Walters to head past Peter Brezovan. Stoke made it 3–0 in the final moments of the first half after Shawcross headed in to send Stoke into the quarter-final of the FA Cup for the second year running where they were drawn at home to West Ham United.

Stoke made a lively start to the quarter-final tie against the Hammers and could have gone in front after just two minutes after good wide play by Jermaine Pennant set up former Hammer Matthew Etherington but his header was well saved by Robert Green. City took the lead on twelve minutes after Huth headed in a Delap throw-in. West Ham then scored a controversial equaliser after Frédéric Piquionne handled Thomas Hitzlsperger's through ball before lobbing it beyond the reach of the advancing Sørensen and into the net to ensure the two sides went in level at the break. Just 15 seconds after the restart referee Mike Jones was again in the spotlight after he awarded Stoke a penalty, Etherington going down under a challenge from Scott Parker, Etherington took the kick but Green was able to make the save. Stoke re-took the lead through a powerful Danny Higginbotham free-kick which Green managed to get a hand to but it crept over the line. West Ham pushed on for an equaliser but Stoke were able to hold on to secure their place in the semi-final at Wembley.

Stoke were drawn against Bolton Wanderers in the semi-final. It will be Stoke's fourth semi-final appearance and first since 1972 and also their first trip to the new national stadium. As expected there was a great interest from fans with City selling out all 34,000 tickets a week before the match. Kenwyne Jones says the players need to no let the occasion get the better of them. Also Jonathan Walters and Thomas Sørensen and Rory Delap say the squad have their sights on winning the cup. Whilst Bolton manager Owen Coyle says that his team will have to be at their best if they want to beat Stoke.

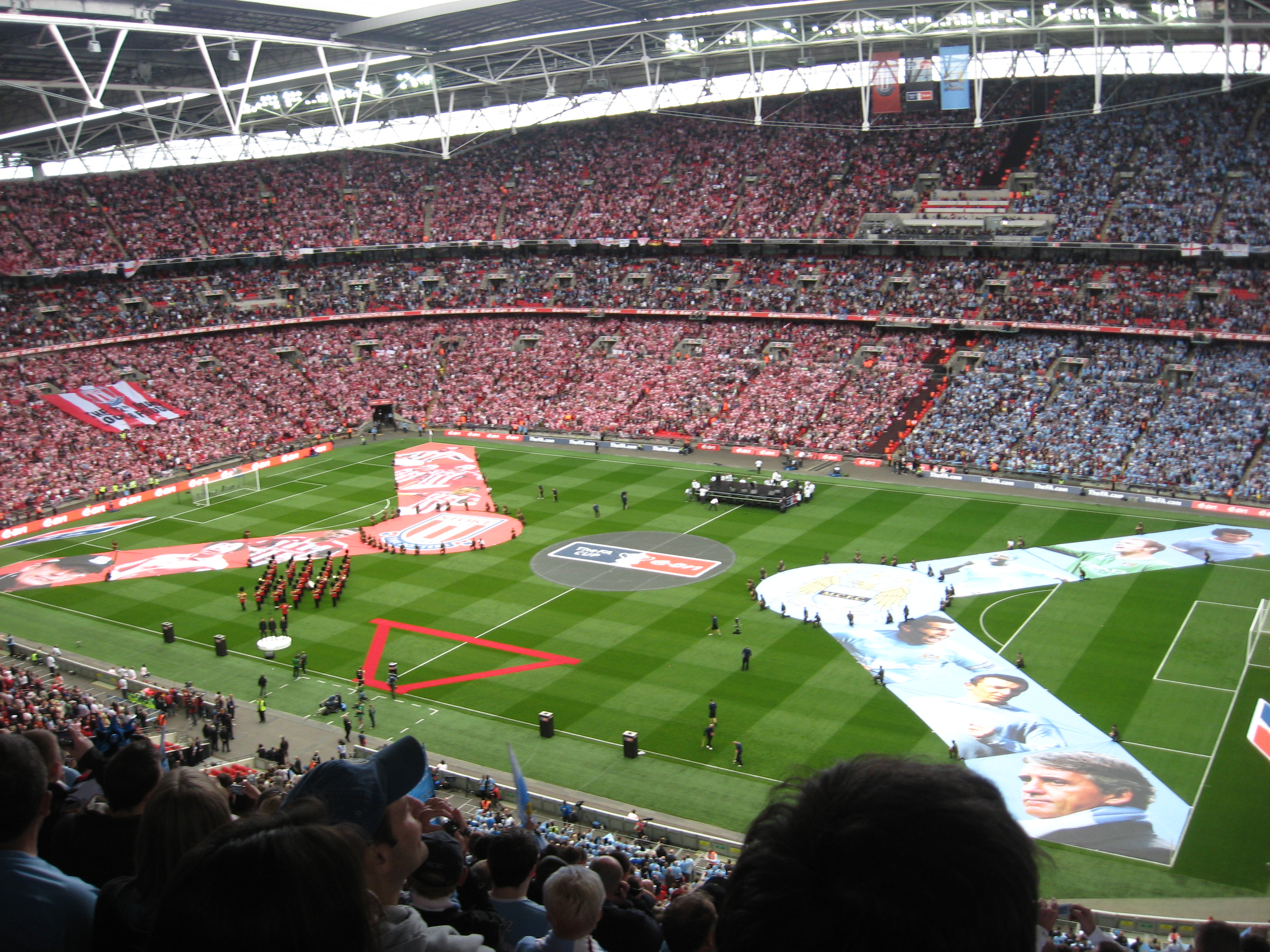
Stoke fans at the 2011 FA Cup final

Stoke took on Bolton at Wembley in what proved to be a very one-sided FA Cup Semi final. Bolton started the match brightly before Matthew Etherington's low drive beat Jussi Jääskeläinen. Five minutes later it was 2–0 as Wilkinson hooked a high ball into the box, and the ball broke to Huth and he lashed a shot on the volley which flew beyond the despairing dive of Jääskeläinen. On the half-hour poor play from Martin Petrov allowed Pennant to cut in from the right wing and lay off Kenwyne Jones to give Stoke a 3–0 half time advantage. Wanderers boss Owen Coyle made two half-time with changes with Matthew Taylor and Mark Davies replacing the poor Petrov and Klasnic. Despite the subs it was City who continued to dominate and Jonathan Walters scored twice to emphatically send Stoke into their first FA Cup Final appearance in their 148-year history. The result was the largest FA Cup Semi-final win since Wolves beat Grimsby Town in 1939, it was also Stoke's largest FA Cup win for 104 years and the biggest winning margin by a professional side at the new Wembley.

Pulis credited chairman Peter Coates following the win and winger Etherington said it was the performance of their lives. Peter Coates hailed the triumph as the biggest win in the Club's history. There was obviously contrasting emotions for the "Trotters" as captain Kevin Davies issued an apology to the Bolton fans following their 5–0 defeat. In the other semi-final Manchester City beat their rivals Manchester United to reach the final.

For the final Stoke had a number of injury concerns with Danny Higginbotham and Ricardo Fuller both out injured whilst Matthew Etherington and Robert Huth were both doubts after having come off injured in two previous Premier League games. However the latter two started the match but could do little to prevent a dominant first half display from Manchester City. Only Thomas Sørensen kept the scores level at half time having made a number of fine saves described by Stoke legend Gordon Banks as world class. Stoke improved in the second half with Kenwyne Jones going through one-on-one but he hit his shot straight at Joe Hart. Yaya Touré scored the only goal of the match after 74 minutes and despite a late urgency from Stoke they failed to create any chances and lost 1–0. Despite the disappointing display by his team Pulis expressed his pride at his players.

Round	Date	Opponent	Venue	Result	Attendance	Scorers	Report
R3	8 January 2011	Cardiff City	H	1–1	18,629	Tuncay 44'	Report
R3 Replay	18 January 2011	Cardiff City	A	2–0 (aet)	13,617	Walters (2) 92', 115'	Report
R4	30 January 2011	Wolverhampton Wanderers	A	1–0	11,967	Huth 81'	Report
R5	19 February 2011	Brighton & Hove Albion	H	3–0	21,312	Carew 14', Walters 22', Shawcross 43'	Report
Quarter-final	13 March 2011	West Ham United	H	2–1	24,550	Huth 12', Higginbotham 63'	Report
Semi-final	17 April 2011	Bolton Wanderers	N	5–0	75,064	Etherington 11', Huth 17', Jones 30', Walters (2) 68', 81'	Report
Final	14 May 2011	Manchester City	N	0–1	88,643		Report

== League Cup ==
Stoke were drawn at home to League Two side Shrewsbury Town in the second round of the League Cup. the "Shrews" had beaten Charlton Athletic 4–3 in the first round. Stoke fielded a fairly strong side with Carlo Nash making his first start since returning to the club. It was Shrewsbury who made the brighter start with Dutch striker Benjamin van den Broek shooting harmlessly at Nash. Stoke took the lead on 26 minutes with a diving header from Jonathan Walters who scored his first City goal, it was 2–0 ten minutes later when Tuncay headed past Chris Neal. It was a quite second half with Stoke looking for the third goal but were guilty of some missed opportunity. Shrewsbury gave themselves hope when Steven Leslie scored but the match finished 2–1 to Stoke.

Stoke drew Fulham at home in the third round, the "Cottagers" had beaten local side Port Vale 6–0 in the previous round. Stoke made the more positive start and were rewarded with the opening goal in the 23rd minute when Danny Higginbotham was left unmarked to head past Mark Schwarzer. Fulham rarely troubled Asmir Begović in the Stoke goal, with Mousa Dembélé and Eddie Johnson going closest. Stoke sealed the win ten minutes from time after Jones converted a Rory Delap throw.

In the next round against West Ham, Stoke made a bright start and took the lead after six minutes through Jones. Stoke then dominated the match and had a number of chances to score the second goal, but West Ham managed to level through Scott Parker just before the end of the match. With Pulis having taken off his three attacking options and replacing them with defensive players prior to Parker scoring, it was inevitable that the "Hammers" would make it through to the next round.

Round	Date	Opponent	Venue	Result	Attendance	Scorers	Report
R2	24 August 2010	Shrewsbury Town	H	2–1	11,995	Walters 26', Tuncay 37'	Report
R3	21 September 2010	Fulham	H	2–0	12,778	Higginbotham 23', Jones 79'	Report
R4	27 October 2010	West Ham United	A	1–3 (aet)	25,325	Jones 6'	Report

== Squad statistics ==
No.	Pos.	Name	Premier League		FA Cup		League Cup		Total		Discipline	
No.	Pos.	Name	Apps	Goals	Apps	Goals	Apps	Goals	Apps	Goals	Yellow card	Red card
1	GK	(Bosnia and Herzegovina) Asmir Begović	28	0	0	0	2	0	30	0	3	0
3	DF	(England) Danny Higginbotham	9(1)	2	3	1	3	1	15(1)	4	0	0
4	DF	(Germany) Robert Huth	35	6	6	3	3	0	44	9	8	0
5	DF	(Wales) Danny Collins	23(2)	0	1(1)	0	0	0	24(3)	0	6	0
6	MF	(Republic of Ireland) Glenn Whelan	14(15)	0	6(1)	0	3	0	23(16)	0	2	0
7	FW	(Iceland) Eiður Guðjohnsen	0(4)	0	0	0	0(1)	0	0(5)	0	0	0
8	MF	(England) Tom Soares	0	0	0(1)	0	0	0	0(1)	0	0	0
9	FW	(Trinidad and Tobago) Kenwyne Jones	33(1)	9	4(2)	1	2	2	39(3)	12	0	0
10	FW	(Jamaica) Ricardo Fuller	9(19)	4	2(4)	0	1(1)	0	12(24)	4	6	0
11	FW	(Mali) Mamady Sidibé	0(2)	0	0	0	0	0	0(2)	0	0	0
12	MF	(Republic of Ireland) Marc Wilson	21(7)	1	5(2)	0	0	0	26(9)	1	8	0
14	MF	(England) Danny Pugh	5(5)	0	3(2)	0	1(2)	0	9(9)	0	2	0
15	MF	(Senegal) Salif Diao	3(5)	0	2	0	1	0	6(5)	0	5	0
16	MF	(England) Jermaine Pennant	26(3)	3	6	0	1	0	33(3)	3	3	0
17	DF	(England) Ryan Shawcross (c)	36	1	5	1	3	0	44	2	10	2
18	MF	(England) Dean Whitehead	31(6)	2	0(4)	0	1(1)	0	32(11)	2	6	0
19	FW	(Republic of Ireland) Jonathan Walters	27(9)	6	7	5	2(1)	1	36(10)	12	6	0
20	FW	(Turkey) Tuncay	5(9)	1	1	1	3	1	9(9)	3	0	0
21	DF	(England) Andrew Davies	0	0	0	0	0	0	0	0	0	0
22	FW	(Norway) John Carew	7(3)	1	2(1)	1	0	0	9(4)	2	1	0
23	MF	(England) Michael Tonge	0(2)	0	0(1)	0	1	0	1(3)	0	0	0
24	MF	(Republic of Ireland) Rory Delap	33(4)	2	5(1)	0	0(3)	0	38(8)	2	4	0
25	DF	(Senegal) Abdoulaye Faye	12(2)	1	2	0	0	0	14(2)	1	1	0
26	MF	(England) Matthew Etherington	30(2)	5	5(1)	1	2	0	37(3)	6	5	0
27	GK	(England) Carlo Nash	0	0	0	0	1	0	1	0	0	0
28	DF	(England) Andy Wilkinson	21(1)	0	3	0	3	0	27(1)	0	6	0
29	GK	(Denmark) Thomas Sørensen	10	0	7	0	0	0	17	0	0	0
30	DF	(England) Ryan Shotton	0(2)	0	2	0	0	0	2(2)	0	0	0
35	FW	(England) Ben Marshall	0	0	0	0	0	0	0	0	0	0
36	MF	(Northern Ireland) Matthew Lund	0	0	0	0	0	0	0	0	0	0
38	GK	(England) Danzelle St Louis-Hamilton	0	0	0	0	0	0	0	0	0	0
42	FW	(England) Louis Moult	0	0	0	0	0	0	0	0	0	0
–	–	Own goals	–	2	–	0	–	0	–	2	–	–

== Transfers ==
=== In ===
Date	Pos.	Name	From	Fee	Ref.
8 July 2010	MF	(Belgium) Florent Cuvelier	(England) Portsmouth	Undisclosed	
13 July 2010	GK	(England) Carlo Nash	(England) Everton	Free	
11 August 2010	FW	(Trinidad and Tobago) Kenwyne Jones	(England) Sunderland	£8 million	
18 August 2010	FW	(Republic of Ireland) Jon Walters	(England) Ipswich Town	£2.75 million	
31 August 2010	FW	(Iceland) Eiður Guðjohnsen	(France) Monaco	Undisclosed	
31 August 2010	MF	(Republic of Ireland) Marc Wilson	(England) Portsmouth	Part-exchange + Fee	
1 January 2011	MF	(England) Jermaine Pennant	(Spain) Real Zaragoza	£1.725 million	
23 March 2011	DF	(Sweden) Smajl Suljević	(Sweden) Dalkurd FF	Undisclosed	

=== Out ===
Date	Pos.	Name	To	Fee	Ref.
18 May 2010	MF	(Senegal) Amdy Faye	(England) Leeds United	Released	
14 June 2010	MF	(England) Nathaniel Wedderburn	(England) Northampton Town	Free	
1 July 2010	DF	(England) Andy Griffin	(England) Reading	Nominal fee	
1 July 2010	GK	(England) Steve Simonsen	(England) Sheffield United	Free	
13 August 2010	FW	(England) James Beattie	(Scotland) Rangers	Undisclosed	
31 August 2010	FW	(England) Dave Kitson	(England) Portsmouth	Part-exchange	
31 August 2010	MF	(Republic of Ireland) Liam Lawrence	(England) Portsmouth	Part-exchange	
31 January 2011	FW	(Turkey) Tuncay	(Germany) VfL Wolfsburg	€5.2 million	
31 February 2011	GK	(England) Danzelle St Louis-Hamilton	(England) Darlington	Free	
30 June 2011	GK	(England) Dave Parton	Unattached	Released	
30 June 2011	DF	(England) Zack Foster	Unattached	Released	
30 June 2011	MF	(England) Cameron Mitchell	Unattached	Released	
30 June 2011	DF	(England) Laton Wint	Unattached	Released	
30 June 2011	DF	(England) Alex Hedley	Unattached	Released	

=== Loan in ===
Date from	Date to	Pos.	Name	From	Ref.
31 August 2010	1 January 2011	MF	(England) Jermaine Pennant	(Spain) Real Zaragoza	
21 January 2011	1 June 2011	FW	(Norway) John Carew	(England) Aston Villa	

=== Loan out ===
Date from	Date to	Pos.	Name	To	Ref.
12 July 2010	30 June 2011	MF	(Uruguay) Diego Arismendi	(England) Barnsley	
27 July 2010	30 June 2011	DF	(Senegal) Ibrahima Sonko	(England) Portsmouth	
30 July 2010	3 January 2011	FW	(England) Louis Moult	(England) Bradford City	
13 August 2010	30 June 2011	DF	(England) Carl Dickinson	(England) Portsmouth	
31 August 2010	30 June 2011	MF	(England) Ben Marshall	(England) Carlisle United	
6 October 2010	6 November 2010	DF	(England) Andrew Davies	(England) Walsall	
18 November 2010	18 December 2010	MF	(England) Danny Pugh	(England) Preston North End	
18 November 2010	18 December 2010	MF	(England) Michael Tonge	(England) Preston North End	
26 November 2010	26 December 2010	MF	(England) Matthew Lund	(England) Hereford United	
31 January 2011	30 June 2011	FW	(Iceland) Eiður Guðjohnsen	(England) Fulham	
31 January 2011	28 February 2011	FW	(England) Louis Moult	(England) Mansfield Town	
18 February 2011	30 June 2011	DF	(England) Andrew Davies	(England) Middlesbrough	
