= Danny Higginbotham =

Association football player (born 1978)

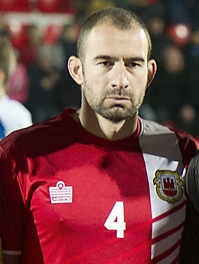
- Higginbotham with Gibraltar in 2014

Personal information
- Full name: Daniel John Higginbotham
- Date of birth: 29 December 1978 (age 47)
- Place of birth: Manchester, England
- Height: 6 ft 1 in (1.85 m)
- Position: Defender

Youth career
- 1994–1997: Manchester United

Senior career*
Years	Team	Apps	(Gls)
1997–2000	Manchester United	4	(0)
1998–1999	→ Royal Antwerp (loan)	29	(3)
2000–2003	Derby County	86	(3)
2003–2006	Southampton	94	(4)
2006–2007	Stoke City	45	(7)
2007–2008	Sunderland	22	(3)
2008–2013	Stoke City	64	(4)
2012	→ Nottingham Forest (loan)	6	(1)
2012	→ Ipswich Town (loan)	12	(0)
2013	Sheffield United	15	(0)
2013–2014	Chester	17	(1)
2014	Altrincham	2	(0)
Total		396	(26)

International career
2013–2014	Gibraltar	3	(0)
- * Club domestic league appearances and goals

Daniel John Higginbotham (born 29 December 1978) is a former professional footballer who played as a defender. Born in England, he represented Gibraltar in international football.

Higginbotham started his career in the Manchester United academy. After making his senior debut for the club, he was sent out on loan to Belgian side Royal Antwerp. After his return the following season, he could not claim a regular first-team place and joined Derby County in search of more playing time in 2000. He spent three years at Derby but made a transfer request when the club was relegated from the Premier League. Southampton signed Higginbotham for a £1.5 million fee in February 2003, and he helped them reach the 2003 FA Cup Final. When Southampton were relegated in 2005, Higginbotham rejected a new contract and was placed on the transfer list.

He joined fellow Championship side Stoke City for a £225,000 fee in August 2006. He was made captain when Michael Duberry left in January 2007, and Stoke went on to narrowly miss out on a play-off place. With Stoke not promoted, Higginbotham again decided to hand in a transfer request to help force through a move to Sunderland. He spent one season at the Stadium of Light before returning to Stoke in 2008. He became a vital member of Tony Pulis' squad as Stoke established themselves in the Premier League. He scored the winning goal in the FA Cup quarter-final against West Ham United but missed out on both the semi-final and the final due to a knee injury. After his recovery, he struggled to force his way back into the side. He spent time out on loan to Nottingham Forest and Ipswich Town before joining Sheffield United on a free transfer in January 2013. After eight months at Bramall Lane, he left to join Conference Premier side Chester before ending his career with a short spell at Altrincham.

Higginbotham made his international debut for Gibraltar in a friendly against Slovakia in November 2013 at the age of 34, qualifying through his maternal grandmother. In January 2014, Higginbotham retired from club football after a 14-year career but made two more international appearances for Gibraltar until his international retirement in March.

== Early life ==
Born in Manchester, Higginbotham grew up in nearby Altrincham. Despite passing his eleven plus exam he was denied entry into Altrincham Grammar School for Boys. His elder brother, Paul, played non-League football for Witton Albion.

== Club career ==
=== Manchester United ===
Higginbotham started his career at his local club Manchester United but was not highly rated during the first year of his apprenticeship, and his career was almost ended when he broke his femur in a B team match. However, he recovered well from the injury and was given a two-year professional contract in 1998. He made his Premier League debut on 10 May 1998, coming on for Michael Clegg 60 minutes into a 2–0 win over Barnsley at Oakwell.

He was sent to Belgian Second Division side Royal Antwerp on a loan spell. He got off to a bad start at the club and asked to return to Old Trafford after being abused by Antwerp supporters outside the Bosuilstadion, and had to be talked into staying by manager Regi Van Acker. Following this start, the club then won 15 matches in a row, and Higginbotham became popular with the fans. However, the season ended with defeat in a play-off game. After the final whistle, Ronnie Wallwork allegedly attacked the referee Amand Ancion. Higginbotham was subsequently banned from football for a year for his alleged involvement in the attack. In September 1999, a Belgian court reduced Higginbotham's ban to four months. Ancion maintained that Wallwork had grabbed him by the throat and that Higginbotham had headbutted him. Higginbotham always maintained his innocence, stating that he had tried to intervene peacefully after Wallwork had aggressively confronted Ancion. Alex Ferguson believed the player's innocence and handed both players four-year contracts as the club appealed their suspensions.

Higginbotham played six games for United during the 1999–2000 season, including appearances in the UEFA Champions League and at the Maracanã Stadium in the FIFA World Cup Championship. He made his full debut in a 3–0 defeat to Aston Villa at Villa Park on 13 October 1999, in what was described as a blow to the credibility of the League Cup as United had fielded several young players. He suffered with concussion during the match after a clash of heads with Dion Dublin. He failed to break into the first team on a regular basis as Denis Irwin, Phil Neville and Mikaël Silvestre were all preferred ahead of him at left-back.

=== Derby County ===
Higginbotham's desire to play regular first-team football led to him joining Derby County for a £2 million fee – a large sum for a young player with just four top-flight appearances to his name. His decision to leave Manchester United was praised by the player he failed to displace, Denis Irwin. Higginbotham made his debut in a 2–2 draw with Southampton, and had a good start to his Derby career until he was substituted at half-time during his third appearance after struggling to contain Everton's Niclas Alexandersson. Manager Jim Smith soon switched to a new system without any full-backs but Higginbotham adapted well to playing on the left-side of a three-man defence. Derby avoid relegation out of the Premier League on the penultimate day of 2000–01 with a 1–0 victory over his former club Manchester United at Old Trafford.

He began 2001–02 on the left side of central defence despite Smith reverting to a 4–4–2 formation. Smith was sacked after a poor start, but his replacement Colin Todd failed to improve the club's form. Todd was sacked and replaced with John Gregory, with similarly poor results. Higginbotham scored his first goal in English football on 16 March 2002, converting a penalty to secure a 3–1 victory over Bolton Wanderers after striker Fabrizio Ravanelli backed out of taking the penalty. This would prove to be the last win of a relegation campaign, with the only remaining positive to the season for Higginbotham coming when he was voted as the fans' Player of the Year.

On 17 August 2002, he collided badly with Grimsby Town forward Steve Livingstone and knocked Livingstone unconscious; this left Livingstone with a skull fracture that would see him out of action for two months. It was expected that Higginbotham would eventually move unless Derby did well enough to gain promotion back to the Premier League, and so in January 2003, with Derby struggling in the First Division, he moved to Southampton on loan, joining permanently in February.

=== Southampton ===
Following Derby's relegation from the Premier League, Higginbotham moved to Southampton in January 2003 on loan until the end of 2002–03. The move was made permanent in February 2003 for a £1.5 million fee. He featured in Southampton's FA Cup run in 2002–03, playing once in the fifth round against Norwich City, but was an unused substitute for the final against Arsenal.

The 2003–04 season was difficult for the club, and Gordon Strachan resigned in March. Higginbotham felt that his replacement, Paul Sturrock, was unable to handle the pressure at St Mary's but denied press rumours that Sturrock had lost the confidence of the players. Steve Wigley took charge for 2004–05 and the club's decline continued. Wigley demoted Higginbotham to the reserves after following a falling out between the pair, though he soon reversed the decision and returned him to the first team. Harry Redknapp replaced Wigley as manager in December 2004 but failed to arrest the decline, and Southampton were relegated in last place. Higginbotham had scored the equalising goal in the penultimate match of the season at Crystal Palace, but a final day defeat to Manchester United left Southampton two points from safety.

George Burley took over from Redknapp in December 2005, though neither manager was able to put together an effective promotion campaign, and Southampton ended the season 12th in the Championship. Higginbotham rejected a new contract and was placed on the transfer list in July 2006. He told the local press that he felt disrespected the way Southampton chairman Rupert Lowe had handled his contract – he had taken a pay cut to move from Derby, a 40% pay cut following relegation, and then the new contract offer was lower still than his current contract.

=== Stoke City ===
Higginbotham joined Southampton's Championship rivals Stoke City on 3 August 2006 for an initial £225,000 fee, and quickly cemented a regular place in Tony Pulis's starting line-up. He began 2006–07 at left-back but soon established himself at centre-back after initially filling in for Clint Hill following Hill's sending off at Wolverhampton Wanderers on 23 September 2006. Pulis gave Stoke a reputation as a "Battersea Dogs Home" club. Higginbotham proved to be a typical signing as he felt unwanted at Southampton and said his career had been reinvigorated by the move to the Britannia Stadium. Stoke went seven games without conceding a goal. During this run, Higginbotham scored the only goal of the game against local rivals West Bromwich Albion after deposing Carl Hoefkens as the club's penalty taker. In February 2007, he was awarded the club captaincy following Michael Duberry's departure to Reading. Throughout the season he scored a career-high seven goals in his 46 appearances. Though Stoke narrowly missed out on the play-offs, a successful personal campaign culminated in Higginbotham being voted the club's Player of the Year.

=== Sunderland ===
On 28 August 2007, it was announced that Stoke had accepted a bid from Sunderland, after Higginbotham had handed a transfer request to the club. Higginbotham wrote in his autobiography that Pulis would only authorise the deal if he handed in a transfer request. Higginbotham signed a four-year deal with Sunderland the following day, moving for a £2.5 million fee, possibly rising to £3 million dependent on appearances. He said that the chance to play Premier League football under Roy Keane was too good to refuse. On 10 November 2007, Higginbotham scored the opening goal for Sunderland which was believed to come off his ear in a 1–1 draw with their Tyne-Wear rivals Newcastle United at the Stadium of Light. He was only a bit-part player by the start of 2008–09, and Keane allowed him to return to Stoke for the same fee that he had paid to Stoke.

=== Return to Stoke City ===
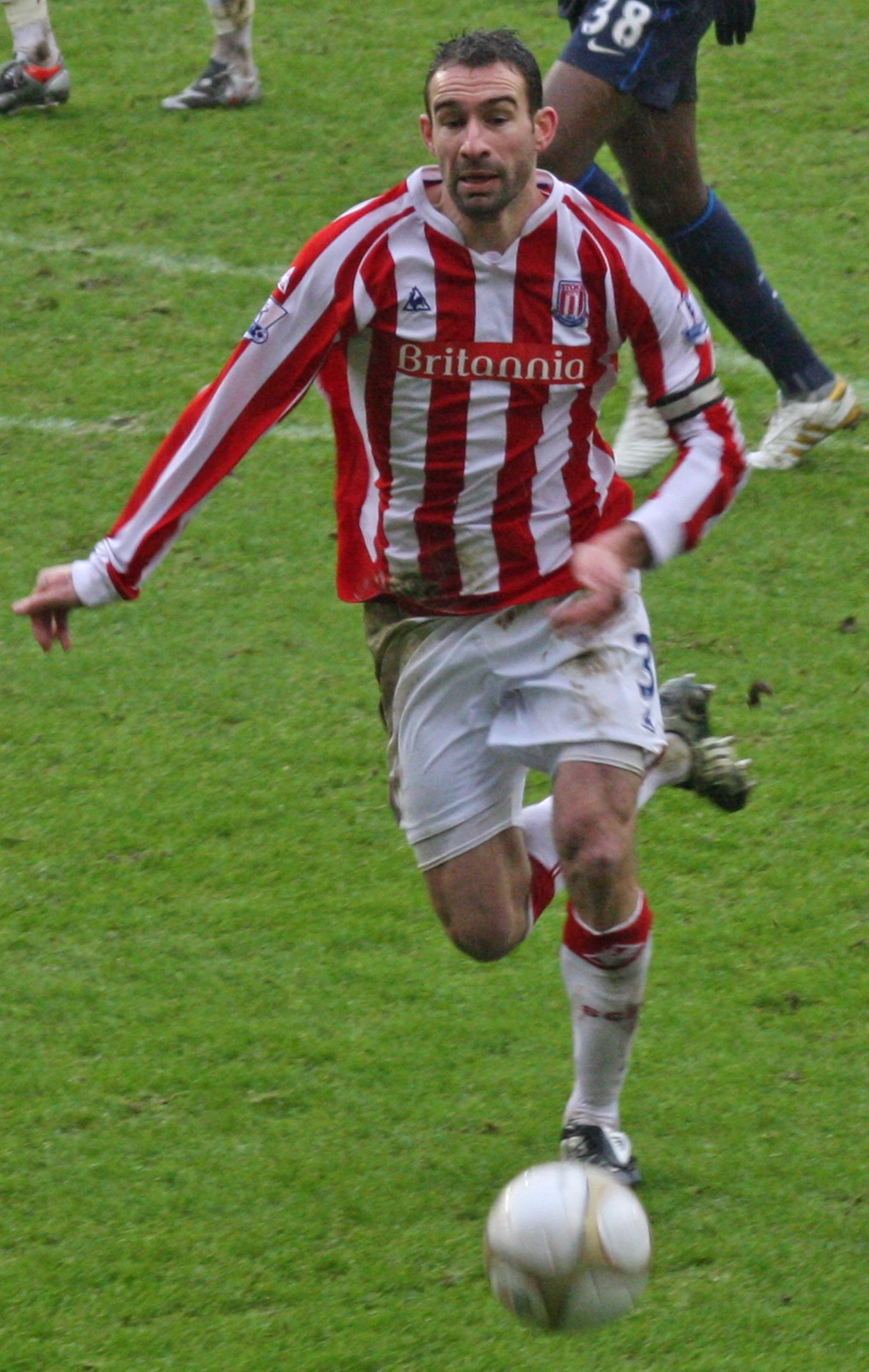
Higginbotham playing for Stoke City in 2010

Higginbotham re-joined Stoke, now in the Premier League, in September 2008 for a £2.5 million fee. On 19 October 2008, Higginbotham scored the first goal of his second spell, with a penalty in a 2–1 win over Tottenham Hotspur. He was the first choice at left-back for manager Tony Pulis, playing in 28 league matches as the team successfully fought for survival. However, he missed the final five matches of the season due to a slipped disc. He later underwent surgery.

With the summer signing of Danny Collins, Higginbotham was dropped to the bench before regaining his place in the team, mainly being utilised in his more natural position in the centre of defence, and scored the first goal in a 3–0 win over Blackburn Rovers on 8 February 2010. He was praised by first-team coach Mark O'Connor for reclaiming his place in the side.

He started the first match of 2010–11 away at Wolverhampton Wanderers but was dropped for the next match in favour of Collins. Higginbotham signed a contract extension in October 2010 for a further 12 months, keeping him at Stoke until the summer of 2013. He made his 200th top-flight appearance against Manchester United on 24 October 2010. He struggled with injury for the rest of the first half of the season and was in and out of the first team.

"We wanted to cement Danny's future with the club because he is such a good professional and it is important we look after certain players at the football club who started all this off. I've got a lot of time for Danny because he is one who falls into that category. He may not be in the side on a regular basis at the moment, but he still has a crucial role to play, as do a number of other players in a similar situation. The fabric of a football club is made up of the whole cloth, not bits and pieces, so we are delighted Danny will remain a part of that."

— Stoke manager Tony Pulis on Danny Higginbotham's new contract.

After signing his contract extension, Higginbotham stated that he wanted to end his career at Stoke. He scored a rare league goal in January 2011 against Bolton Wanderers. He scored the first FA Cup goal of his career in a quarter-final win against West Ham United in March 2011. It proved to be the winning goal, thus earning Stoke their first semi-final appearance in 39 years. He scored an identical goal against Newcastle United the following week. However, in the next league match against Chelsea, Higginbotham sustained a cruciate knee ligament injury that ruled him out for six months. Pulis spoke of his disappointment at losing Higginbotham but also stressed he would play a key role in the final few matches of the season due to his influence in the dressing room. Higginbotham later admitted that missing the FA Cup final made him "jealous" of his teammates.

Higginbotham targeted to return from his knee injury by October 2011. He marked his return from his knee injury by scoring the only goal in a 1–0 reserve team win over Sheffield United on 11 October 2011. However, after failing to force his way back into the first team, Higginbotham joined Championship team Nottingham Forest on loan until the end of the season on 31 January 2012. Upon signing for Forest, Higginbotham admitted that he was unsure of his future at Stoke. He was backed by Thomas Sørensen to make a return to Stoke's first team. On 10 March 2012, Higginbotham scored his first goal for a year when he scored the second for Forest in a 3–1 home win over Millwall. His loan spell with Forest was ended early in April 2012 due to injury.

Higginbotham joined Championship club Ipswich Town on a one-month loan on 21 September 2012, which was later extended until January 2013. He was expected to extend his loan until the end of the season but Higginbotham rejected the deal saying he wanted to be based closer to his home, and left Portman Road having played 12 matches. After his move to Sheffield United, Higginbotham has stated that his six-year spell at Stoke was 'the best years of his career'.

=== Later career ===
On 1 January 2013, Higginbotham signed for Sheffield United on a six-month contract, and made his debut for the club against their South Yorkshire rivals Doncaster Rovers the same day. Former Stoke teammate and current Sheffield United teammate Dave Kitson played a part in Higginbotham's move to Bramall Lane, Higginbotham stated on his move to the club: "I was getting ready to go back to Ipswich on Sunday but after speaking to Dave I was optimistic something would be sorted here and thankfully it was ... I was very surprised and very happy when I got a phone call on Sunday to say that something could be happening here [Sheffield United] ... Dropping into League One isn't a worry for me because this is a club on the up and I didn't want to be stuck at Stoke just picking my money up because that isn't me" On 18 June 2013, having made sufficient first-team appearances for Sheffield United, Higginbotham activated a clause in his contract to extend it for the following season.

On 29 August 2013, Higginbotham joined Conference Premier club Chester on a one-year deal after falling out of the Sheffield United first team. After making 17 appearances for Chester, Higginbotham left the club to forge a media career. After leaving Chester, Higginbotham signed for Altrincham of the Conference North, as he wished to continue playing on a part-time basis with fewer travel commitments. Higginbotham had previously stated it was an ambition of his to play for Altrincham, as he had supported them as a boy. He announced his retirement from football on 8 January 2014.

== International career ==
Born and raised in England, Higginbotham was eligible to play for the Gibraltar national team through his maternal grandmother. The former Gibraltar manager, Allen Bula, is his uncle. Higginbotham made his international debut in Gibraltar's first ever match as a UEFA member, a 0–0 draw in a friendly against Slovakia, on 19 November 2013. He was praised for his performance and was named man of the match. He announced his retirement from international football in March 2014, having earned three caps for Gibraltar.

== Media career ==
In February 2013, Higginbotham began to write his own column in The Sentinel, a local newspaper in the North Staffordshire and South Cheshire area. Higginbotham also has a regular sports column in The Independent. He released his autobiography in April 2015, entitled: Rise of the Underdog. He has appeared on several television and radio stations, including Talksport, BBC Radio 5 Live, BT Sport, ESPN, Sky Sports and NBC Sports.

On 17 December 2020, it was announced that Higginbotham would be the new color commentator for the Philadelphia Union starting with the 2021 season.

== Personal life ==
His first child, Jak, was born in 2001. His second child, Jessica, was born on 12 October 2003. His first marriage ended in 2008.

In 2010, he married Nicole, an American, who gave birth to his third child, Joshua, in 2011, and his fourth, Jacob, in 2013.

== Career statistics ==
=== Club ===
Appearances and goals by club, season and competition
Club	Season	League			National cup (Note: Includes FA Cup, Belgian Cup)		League cup (Note: Includes Football League Cup)		Europe		Other		Total	
Club	Season	Division	Apps	Goals	Apps	Goals	Apps	Goals	Apps	Goals	Apps	Goals	Apps	Goals
Manchester United	1997–98	Premier League	1	0	0	0	0	0	0	0	0	0	1	0
Manchester United	1998–99	Premier League	0	0	0	0	0	0	0	0	0	0	0	0
Manchester United	1999–2000	Premier League	3	0	—		1	0	1 (Note: Appearance in UEFA Champions League)	0	1 (Note: Appearance in FIFA Club World Championship)	0	6	0
Manchester United	Total		4	0	0	0	1	0	1	0	1	0	7	0
Royal Antwerp (loan)	1998–99	Belgian Second Division	29	3	0	0	—		—		3 (Note: Appearances in Belgian Second Division play-offs)	1	32	4
Derby County	2000–01	Premier League	26	0	3	0	4	0	—		—		33	0
Derby County	2001–02	Premier League	37	1	1	0	2	0	—		—		40	1
Derby County	2002–03	First Division	23	2	0	0	2	1	—		—		25	3
Derby County	Total		86	3	4	0	8	1	—		—		98	4
Southampton	2002–03	Premier League	9	0	1	0	—		—		—		10	0
Southampton	2003–04	Premier League	27	0	1	0	2	0	1 (Note: Appearance in UEFA Cup)	0	—		31	0
Southampton	2004–05	Premier League	21	1	4	0	1	0	—		—		26	1
Southampton	2005–06	Championship	37	3	1	0	1	0	—		—		39	3
Southampton	Total		94	4	7	0	4	0	1	0	—		106	4
Stoke City	2006–07	Championship	44	7	2	0	0	0	—		—		46	7
Stoke City	2007–08	Championship	1	0	—		1	0	—		—		2	0
Stoke City	Total		45	7	2	0	1	0	—		—		48	7
Sunderland	2007–08	Premier League	21	3	0	0	—		—		—		21	3
Sunderland	2008–09	Premier League	1	0	—		0	0	—		—		1	0
Sunderland	Total		22	3	0	0	0	0	—		—		22	3
Stoke City	2008–09	Premier League	28	1	0	0	2	0	—		—		30	1
Stoke City	2009–10	Premier League	24	1	3	0	2	1	—		—		29	2
Stoke City	2010–11	Premier League	10	2	3	1	3	1	—		—		16	4
Stoke City	2011–12	Premier League	2	0	0	0	0	0	3 (Note: Appearances in UEFA Europa League)	0	—		5	0
Stoke City	2012–13	Premier League	0	0	—		0	0	—		—		0	0
Stoke City	Total		64	4	6	1	7	2	3	0	0	0	80	7
Nottingham Forest (loan)	2011–12	Championship	6	1	—		—		—		—		6	1
Ipswich Town (loan)	2012–13	Championship	12	0	—		—		—		—		12	0
Sheffield United	2012–13	League One	15	0	2	0	—		—		1 (Note: Appearance in League One play-offs)	0	18	0
Chester	2013–14	Conference Premier	17	1	1	0	—		—		1 (Note: Appearance in FA Trophy)	0	19	1
Altrincham	2013–14	Conference North	2	0	—		—		—		—		2	0
Career total			396	26	22	1	21	3	5	0	6	1	450	31

=== International ===
Appearances and goals by national team and year
National team	Year	Apps	Goals
Gibraltar	2013	1	0
Gibraltar	2014	2	0
Total		3	0

== Honours ==
Manchester United

- Intercontinental Cup: 1999

Southampton

- FA Cup runner-up: 2002–03

Individual

- Derby County Player of the Year: 2001–02
- Stoke City Player of the Year: 2006–07
