= Jamie Chandler =

English footballer (born 1989)

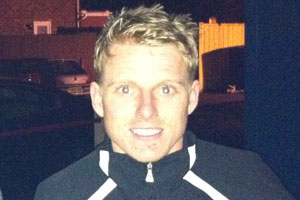
- Chandler in 2011

Personal information
- Full name: Jamie Chandler
- Date of birth: 24 March 1989 (age 37)
- Place of birth: South Shields, England
- Height: 5 ft 7 in (1.70 m)
- Position: Midfielder

Youth career
- –2007: Sunderland

Senior career*
| Years | Team | Apps | (Gls) |
| 2007–2010 | Sunderland | 0 | (0) |
| 2009 | → Darlington (loan) | 14 | (0) |
| 2010–2012 | Darlington | 52 | (4) |
| 2012–2016 | Gateshead | 146 | (17) |
| 2016–2023 | Spennymoor Town | 135 | (4) |

International career^{‡}
| 2005 | England U16 | 2 | (0) |
| 2005–2006 | England U17 | 11 | (0) |
| 2006 | England U18 | 1 | (0) |
| 2007–2008 | England U19 | 5 | (0) |

Managerial career
- 2023: Spennymoor Town
- * Club domestic league appearances and goals as of 21:08, 27 March 2023 (UTC) ‡ National team caps and goals as of 4 September 2010 (UTC)

Jamie Chandler (born 24 March 1989) is an English former professional footballer who played as a midfielder. He was most recently manager of Spennymoor Town.

== Career ==
Chandler was born in South Shields and was brought up in Boldon. He began his career at Sunderland, and while with that club was capped several times by England at levels from under-16 to under-19. He signed his first professional contract in 2007, after recovering from a broken leg.

He was loaned to Football League Two club Darlington in August 2009 to gain first-team experience, and made his debut in the Football League on 8 August against Aldershot Town coming on as a substitute. He made his first start two days later against Leeds United in the League Cup. He returned to Sunderland in November 2009.

At the end of the 2009–10 season, Chandler's contract with Sunderland expired. He signed a two-year deal with Darlington, recently relegated to the Conference Premier. He scored his first goal for his new side against Forest Green Rovers on 11 September 2010. Chandler was named man of the match as Darlington beat Mansfield Town in the 2011 FA Trophy final, and also won the club's Young Player of the Year award.

On 13 January 2012, Chandler signed for Gateshead, along with Liam Hatch, for a nominal fee. He made his debut the following day, scoring in a 2–2 draw against Braintree Town in the FA Trophy. He agreed a new one-year contract with the club in May 2012 to cover the 2012–13 season. On 6 July 2012, Chandler was named vice-captain at Gateshead following the departure of Kris Gate. On 28 March 2016, it was announced that Chandler would leave Gateshead at the end of the 2015–16 season.

On 30 June 2016, Jamie joined National League North side Spennymoor Town on a free transfer. He scored his first goal for the club during the 2017–18 season, and has been a regular starter for the club since 2017.

== Coaching career ==
In October 2022, Chandler was appointed assistant manager of Spennymoor Town until the end of the season.

On 18 May 2023, he was appointed manager of Spennymoor. He resigned from this position on 22 September 2023 after just nine matches in charge, the club sitting in fourth position. Chandler cited difficulties balancing the new job with his personal life as the reason behind his decision.

== Career statistics ==
As of match played 19 November 2022

Appearances and goals by club, season and competition
| Club | Season | League | | | FA Cup | | League Cup | | Other | | Total | |
| Club | Season | Division | Apps | Goals | Apps | Goals | Apps | Goals | Apps | Goals | Apps | Goals |
|---|---|---|---|---|---|---|---|---|---|---|---|---|
| Sunderland | 2007–08 | Premier League | 0 | 0 | 0 | 0 | 0 | 0 | — | | 0 | 0 |
| Sunderland | 2008–09 | Premier League | 0 | 0 | 0 | 0 | 0 | 0 | — | | 0 | 0 |
| Sunderland | 2009–10 | Premier League | 0 | 0 | 0 | 0 | 0 | 0 | — | | 0 | 0 |
| Sunderland | Total | | 0 | 0 | 0 | 0 | 0 | 0 | 0 | 0 | 0 | 0 |
| Darlington (loan) | 2009–10 | League Two | 14 | 0 | 0 | 0 | 1 | 0 | 1 (Note: Appearance in Football League Trophy) | 0 | 16 | 0 |
| Darlington | 2010–11 | Conference Premier | 28 | 2 | 0 | 0 | — | | 6 (Note: Appearances in FA Trophy) | 0 | 34 | 2 |
| Darlington | 2011–12 | Conference Premier | 24 | 2 | 2 | 0 | — | | 0 | 0 | 26 | 2 |
| Darlington | Total | | 66 | 4 | 2 | 0 | 1 | 0 | 7 | 0 | 76 | 4 |
| Gateshead | 2011–12 | Conference Premier | 13 | 1 | 0 | 0 | — | | 3 | 1 | 16 | 2 |
| Gateshead | 2012–13 | Conference Premier | 37 | 4 | 1 | 0 | — | | 2 | 0 | 40 | 4 |
| Gateshead | 2013–14 | Conference Premier | 40 | 8 | 3 | 1 | — | | 3 (Note: One appearance in FA Trophy and two in Conference Premier play-offs) | 0 | 46 | 9 |
| Gateshead | 2014–15 | Conference Premier | 30 | 4 | 2 | 0 | — | | 5 | 1 | 37 | 5 |
| Gateshead | 2015–16 | National League | 26 | 0 | 1 | 0 | — | | 2 | 0 | 29 | 0 |
| Gateshead | Total | | 146 | 17 | 7 | 1 | 0 | 0 | 15 | 2 | 168 | 20 |
| Spennymoor Town | 2016–17 | NPL – Premier Division | 0 | 0 | 2 | 0 | — | | 0 | 0 | 2 | 0 |
| Spennymoor Town | 2017–18 | National League North | 29 | 1 | 0 | 0 | — | | 3 | 0 | 32 | 1 |
| Spennymoor Town | 2018–19 | National League North | 42 | 1 | 1 | 0 | — | | 3 | 0 | 46 | 1 |
| Spennymoor Town | 2019–20 | National League North | 28 | 1 | 1 | 0 | 0 | 0 | 0 | 0 | 29 | 1 |
| Spennymoor Town | 2021–22 | National League North | 33 | 1 | 0 | 0 | 0 | 0 | 4 | 1 | 37 | 2 |
| Spennymoor Town | 2022–23 | National League North | 3 | 0 | 0 | 0 | 0 | 0 | 0 | 0 | 3 | 0 |
| Spennymoor Town | Total | | 135 | 4 | 4 | 0 | 0 | 0 | 10 | 1 | 149 | 5 |
| Career totals | | | 347 | 25 | 13 | 1 | 1 | 0 | 32 | 3 | 393 | 29 |

== Honours ==
Darlington

- FA Trophy: 2010–11

Individual

- Darlington Young Player of the Year: 2010–11
