= Jack Pelter =

New Zealand footballer (born 1987)

Personal information
- Full name: Jack Anthony Pelter
- Date of birth: 30 July 1987 (age 39)
- Place of birth: Barrow-in-Furness, England
- Position: Defender

Team information
- Current team: Metro
- Number: 2

Youth career
- Christchurch Technical
- Ferrymead Bays
- Central United

Senior career*
| Years | Team | Apps | (Gls) |
| 2005–2007 | Canterbury United | 0 | (0) |
| 2007–2008 | Sunderland | 0 | (0) |
| 2009 | Western Suburbs FC | 0 | (0) |
| 2009 | → Vålerenga (loan) | 0 | (0) |
| 2009–2011 | Waitakere United | 13 | (0) |
| 2011– | Metro | 8 | (1) |

International career^{‡}
| 2003–2007 | New Zealand U17 | | |
| 2007–2009 | New Zealand U20 | 3 | (1) |
- * Club domestic league appearances and goals as of 14:47, 3 January 2011 (UTC) ‡ National team caps and goals as of 14:47, 3 January 2011 (UTC)

Jack Anthony Pelter (born 30 July 1987) is a footballer who plays as centre-back for Metro F.C. in the Lotto Sport Italia NRFL Premier. He previously played for Canterbury United, Sunderland, Western Suburbs FC, Vålerenga and Waitakere United.

== Club career ==
=== New Zealand ===
Born in Barrow-in-Furness, Cumbria, England, Pelter emigrated with his family to New Zealand at the age of eight and entered the New Zealand Football Academy whilst twelve years old. He exhibited a love for football in his school work, writing an essay on his personal hero Roy Keane, whilst also supporting English team Blackburn Rovers. He went on to play in the National Soccer League for Christchurch Technical, Ferrymead Bays and Central United. He was taken back to England at the age of fifteen by New Zealand Knights manager Chris Turner who introduced him to the scouting teams at Bolton Wanderers, Chelsea and Swansea City.

After recovering from a serious back injury on his return, Pelter moved to New Zealand Football Championship team Canterbury United in 2005. Due to the semi-professional nature of football in New Zealand, Pelter had to take on other jobs to finance his football regime, with his mother later commenting "After training, he'd go to work in a bar until two in the morning to fund his career, he was running, training and swimming on his own, he used to get up on cold mornings on his own to go running".

The winner of Canterbury United's "Defender of the Year" award and runner-up for "Player of the Year" in only his first season with the club, Pelter subsequently attracted the attention of European clubs in 2007 following his international progress. Born in the United Kingdom, he was eligible to play for any EU club without the need for a work permit and reserve team and youth contracts were offered to him by Leeds United and AC Milan amongst others.

=== Sunderland ===
He took up the offer of a trial at Sunderland in July 2007, appearing in the pre-season friendly defeat against Scunthorpe United and reserve team games against Berwick Rangers and Hebburn Town. He was offered a first team contract by the club in August but an ankle injury he had picked up during the World Cup put the deal in some doubt so he was initially offered a one-month deal, before signing a one-year contract three weeks later in September 2007 on successful completion of his medical. He was released by the club at the end of the 2007–08 season, after which he trained with Bradford City.

=== Vålerenga ===
On 31 August 2009, it was announced that Pelter had joined Vålerenga Fotball in Oslo, Norway, on loan. Pelter primarily played with the B team in the Norwegian Second Division for the remainder of the season.

== International career ==
Pelter has represented New Zealand at the Under-17 and Under-20 levels. He made his Under-17 debut, against Tahiti, in 2003. He was part of New Zealand's Under-20 World Cup 2007 squad, of which he was captain. He made his debut against Mexico on 8 July 2007 at the Commonwealth Stadium in Edmonton also scored New Zealand's only goal of the tournament in that match, as they failed to progress beyond the group stages.

In 2006, Pelter played for the New Zealand A team in the quadrangular Agribank Cup Tournament in Hanoi, Vietnam. All matches were held at the Mỹ Đình National Stadium, and the team finished third behind hosts Vietnam, Bahrain under 21, and Thailand. New Zealand A were beaten 1–0 by Vietnam in their first game of the tournament on 25 October 2006, they were again beaten 1–0 by Thailand on 27 October. New Zealand A finally gained their first and only win beating Bahrain U21 1–0 on 29 October with Leo Shin scoring the goal.
