= 2015–16 Stoke City F.C. season =

Stoke City
2015–16 season
- Chairman: Peter Coates
- Manager: Mark Hughes
- Stadium: Britannia Stadium
- Premier League: 9th (51 points)
- FA Cup: Fourth round
- League Cup: Semi-final
- Top goalscorer: League: Marko Arnautović (11); All: Marko Arnautović (12)
- Highest home attendance: 27,833 v Southampton (12 March 2016)
- Lowest home attendance: 26,747 v West Bromwich Albion (29 August 2015)
- Average home league attendance: 27,534
Home colours	Away colours	Third colours

The 2015–16 season was Stoke City's eighth season in the Premier League and the 60th in the top tier of English football.

After finishing ninth in 2014–15 for a second season running, Mark Hughes made a number of alterations to his squad in preparation for the 2015–16 campaign. Leaving the club were the long-serving trio of Asmir Begović, Robert Huth and Steven Nzonzi with Stoke receiving their record transfer fee in the process. With the money available Hughes broke Stoke's transfer record paying Inter Milan £12 million for Swiss winger Xherdan Shaqiri. He brought in Spanish striker Joselu for £5.75 million and Dutch midfielder Ibrahim Afellay. Also arriving at the Britannia Stadium were Shay Given, Jakob Haugaard, Glen Johnson and Marco van Ginkel.

Stoke made a poor start to their campaign as they failed to win any of their opening six matches, losing home matches 1–0 against Liverpool and West Bromwich Albion and drawing away against Norwich City and Tottenham Hotspur. City also lost to Arsenal and drew at home to Leicester City before claiming their first win against Bournemouth, which was followed up with away victories against Aston Villa and Swansea City. In December Stoke beat both Manchester clubs 2–0 and won 4–3 away at Everton as Stoke ended 2015 in a top half position.

Stoke also had a good run in the League Cup where after knocking out Luton Town, Fulham, Chelsea and Sheffield Wednesday they lost to Liverpool on penalties in the semi-final. Stoke were also knocked out of the FA Cup by Crystal Palace, and with both cup exits sandwiched between three consecutive 3–0 Premier League defeats it rounded up a poor start to 2016 for the Potters.

In the January transfer window Stoke broke their transfer record set in the summer paying Porto £18.3 million for midfielder Giannelli Imbula whilst Steve Sidwell and Marco van Ginkel both departed. Stoke's form improved as they defeated Bournemouth, Aston Villa, Newcastle United and Watford whilst they managed to claim their first Premier League point at Chelsea. However following an injury to Jack Butland Stoke lost their defensive solidarity conceding four goals in three consecutive matches against Liverpool, Tottenham Hotspur and Manchester City earning the team much criticism. They were able to recover though and defeated West Ham United on the final day to finish in ninth position for a third season running.

== Pre-season ==
In February 2015 Stoke announced that New Balance will be their new kit supplier from 2015 to 2016 taking over from Warrior. Stoke will travel to Singapore to take part in the 2015 Premier League Asia Trophy along with Arsenal, Everton and a Singapore Selection XI. They will also take part on the Colonia Cup based in Cologne, Germany along with 1. FC Köln, Porto and Valencia. In May 2015 Stoke completed the permanent signing of Philipp Wollscheid and Danish goalkeeper Jakob Haugaard. On 29 May, Stoke released their retained list which included the departures of long-serving duo Thomas Sørensen and Andy Wilkinson. Also leaving the Britannia Stadium were Wilson Palacios and nine members of the under-21 development squad: Tomi Adeloye, James Alabi, Sam Coulson, Alex Grant, Robbie Parry, Nathan Ricketts-Hopkinson, Adam Thomas, Charlie Ward and Eillot Wheeler. Stoke's first major transfer activity of the summer saw the arrival of Spanish striker Joselu from Hannover 96, whilst Robert Huth completed a permanent switch to Leicester City.

The players returned to training at Clayton Wood on 3 July. The squad travelled to Singapore on 8 July in preparation for the Premier League Asia Trophy. On 9 July, Stoke sold last season's player of the year, Steven Nzonzi, to Sevilla for a fee of £7 million. On 10 July, Stoke completed the double signing of midfielder Marco van Ginkel on a season-long loan from Chelsea and the free transfer of veteran goalkeeper Shay Given from Aston Villa. Former Liverpool defender Glen Johnson joined on a free whilst goalkeeper Asmir Begović left to join Chelsea for a fee believed to be £8 million.

Stoke's first match of pre-season was against Everton in the Premier League Asia Trophy in Singapore. The match was tightly contested encounter which ended goalless after 90 minutes and went to a penalty shoot out. The only player to not score was Marco van Ginkel and the Toffees went through to the final. Stoke played against a Singapore Selection XI in the 3/4 place play-off and won the match 2–0 with goals from Steve Sidwell and Marko Arnautović. On their return to the UK, Stoke played against National League side Wrexham at the Racecourse Ground. City eased to a simple 6–0 victory with goals from Mame Biram Diouf, Marco van Ginkel, Joselu, Dom Telford and a brace from former Wrexham striker Jonathan Walters. The Dragons were denied a consolation after Daniel Bachmann saved Kayden Jackson's penalty. Stoke then faced Championship side Brentford on 25 July which saw Bojan make his return from injury after seven months out. Brentford won the match 2–0 with goals from Akaki Gogia and Stuart Dallas. The squad then spent the following week at a training camp in Evian, France, before the Colonia Cup. Stoke's final preparations for the 2015–16 season were matches against 1. FC Köln, and Porto in the Colonia Cup. Both matches were lost, 2–1 to Köln and 3–0 to Porto.

Match	Date	Opponent	Venue	Result	Scorers	Report
1	15 July 2015	Everton	A	0–0 (4–5 pens.)		Report
2	18 July 2015	Singapore Selection XI	A	2–0	Sidwell 6', Arnautović 72'	Report
3	22 July 2015	Wrexham	A	6–0	Diouf 22', Walters (2) 29', 68', Van Ginkel 41', Joselu 67', Telford 87'	Report
4	25 July 2015	Brentford	A	0–2		Report
5	1 August 2015	1. FC Köln	A	1–2	Odemwingie 79'	Report
6	2 August 2015	Porto	A	0–3		Report

== Premier League ==
=== August ===
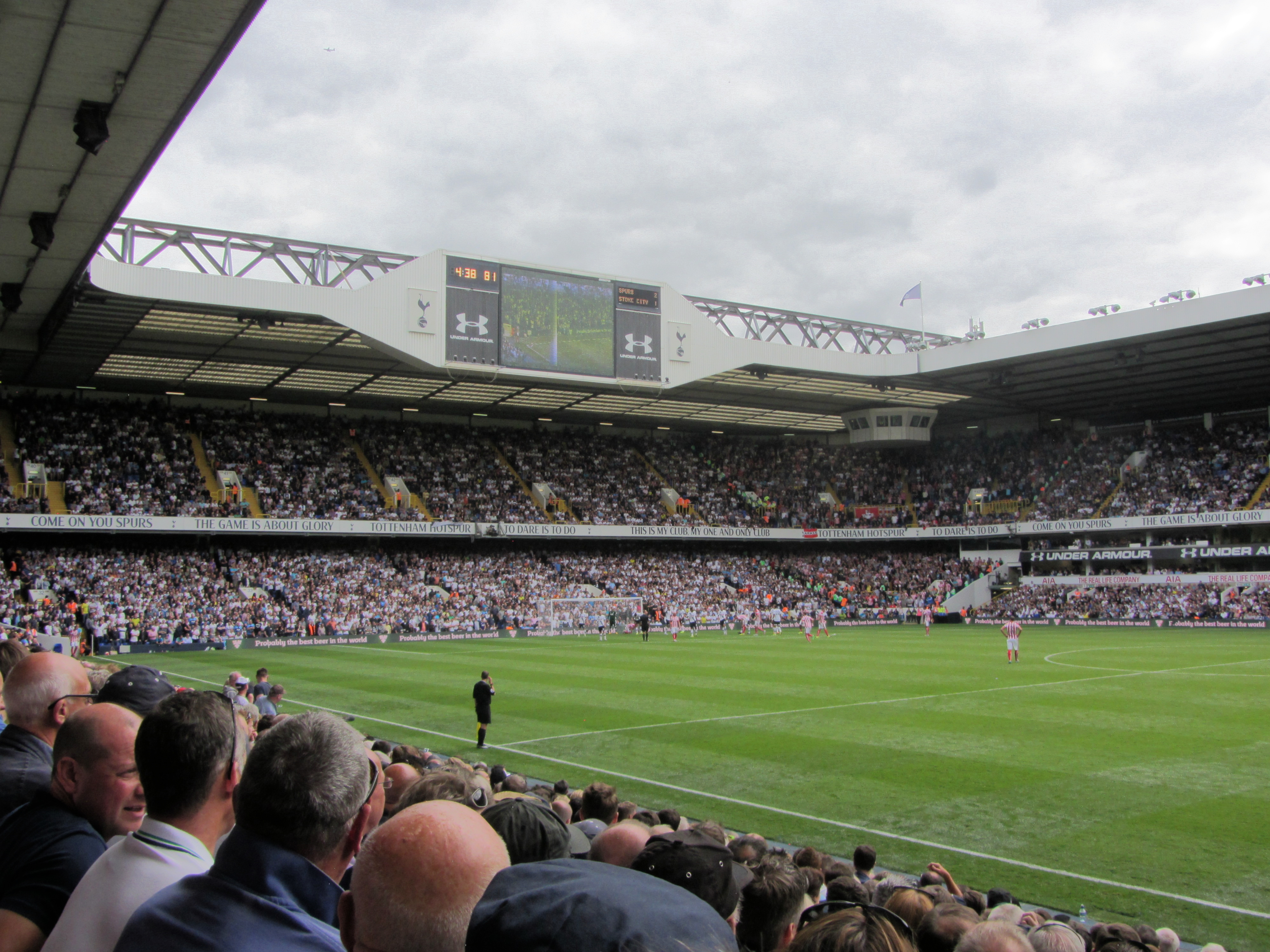
Tottenham v Stoke (15 August 2015)

The fixtures for the 2015–16 Premier League season were released on 17 June 2015 and the first match would be a repeat of the final match of last season where Stoke City beat Liverpool 6–1. It was the first time in Premier League history that two sides have met at the same venue in consecutive fixtures.

Mark Hughes gave debuts to Ibrahim Afellay, Glen Johnson and Marco van Ginkel for the first match of the season against Liverpool. The match was a tight and uneventful affair and with the game seemingly drifting towards a goalless draw, Philippe Coutinho scored from 25-yards in the 86th minute to earn Brendan Rodgers' side the three points. After the match Stoke broke their transfer record by signing Swiss winger Xherdan Shaqiri for £12 million.

The Potters' first away match of the season came against Tottenham Hotspur at White Hart Lane. Stoke suffered a blow before kick-off as it was revealed that Shaqiri would not be able to make his debut, as he needed a serve a one-match suspension carrying over from the Coppa Italia. Spurs started the match strongly and after forcing Jack Butland into some good saves they took the lead through Eric Dier on 19 minutes, scoring a second just before half-time through a volley from Nacer Chadli. Hughes brought on Stephen Ireland and Joselu in an effort to turn the game around and it had the desired impact. Ireland played in Joselu in the penalty area who was fouled by Toby Alderweireld and Marko Arnautović converted the penalty past Hugo Lloris. Stoke completed the comeback after Ireland's cross was headed in by Mame Biram Diouf.

City then travelled to newly promoted Norwich City on 22 August and Hughes was able to give Shaqiri his debut. He made an instant impact, as his free-kick was headed in by Diouf to give Stoke an early lead at Carrow Road, only for Russell Martin to level for Norwich. The Canaries controlled the remainder of the match but could not find a way past an in-form Jack Butland.

Former manager Tony Pulis made his first return to the Britannia Stadium with West Bromwich Albion following his sacking in May 2013. Stoke made a positive start to the match and were in control until the game changed in the 25th minute. Referee Michael Oliver sent-off Ibrahim Afellay for an altercation with Craig Gardner, then five minutes later sent-off Charlie Adam for a scuffle with Craig Dawson. The Baggies took full advantage of the situation with a goal on the stroke of half-time through Venezuelan striker Salomón Rondón. Despite Stoke's nine men putting in a good performance in the second half, they were unable to force an equaliser.

=== September ===
After the international break, Stoke travelled to Arsenal's Emirates Stadium, where they had lost all seven previous visits. The eighth saw no end to that record, as goals from Theo Walcott and Olivier Giroud gave the Gunners the three points. After the match, Mark Hughes criticized his team's poor defending as Stoke made their worst start to a Premier League campaign with just two points from their opening five matches.

Stoke then faced in-form Leicester City at home, with Claudio Ranieri's side still unbeaten in the league. Stoke took the lead after 13 minutes through Bojan after he was played in by Marko Arnautović, then less than ten minutes later, a defensive mix up by former Potter Robert Huth and Wes Morgan let Walters put Stoke up 2–0. Stoke, however, were unable to see out the win, as Riyad Mahrez converted a penalty after Arnautović brought down Danny Drinkwater and Jamie Vardy fired in an equalizer late on to earn the Foxes a point.

Newly promoted Bournemouth were next to arrive at the Britannia Stadium for the first top flight fixture between the two clubs. The Cherries suffered an early set back as their top-scorer Callum Wilson sustained a serious knee injury prompting a lengthy delay. Jonathan Walters scored from Marko Arnautović's cross to put Stoke ahead before Dan Gosling equalised with a deflected strike after the break. Mame Diouf then stooped to head in Glen Johnson's cross from the right on 83 minutes to earn Stoke their first win of the season.

=== October ===
Stoke's first match of October was against fellow Midlands opponents Aston Villa at Villa Park. Marko Arnautović had a goal ruled out for offside in the first half although replays showed that he was onside. Arnautović did score in the second half after he was played in by Glen Johnson, and Stoke held on to secure back-to-back wins.

Following the international break, where goalkeeper Jack Butland made his competitive debut for England, Stoke faced a long trip to Swansea City on a Monday night. Stoke were awarded an early penalty when Ashley Williams brought down Bojan in the penalty area, who stepped up to convert the spot kick. Arnautović had a goal disallowed for offside in the second half, whilst the Swans rarely threatened to score themselves, with Jonjo Shelvey getting closest, hitting the post from a tight angle; Stoke were able to see out the victory. It was Stoke's first win at the Liberty Stadium after four previous visits.

Stoke then hosted newly promoted Watford on 24 October. The Potters produced a poor performance and goals from Troy Deeney and Almen Abdi earned Quique Sánchez Flores' Hornets a 2–0 win.

Stoke ended October with a goalless draw away at Newcastle United. Goalkeeper Jack Butland prevented the Magpies from claiming the win with a number of vital saves.

=== November ===
Eleven days after knocking Chelsea out of the League Cup, the two sides met again at the Britannia, although this time the Blues were without manager José Mourinho, who was serving a stadium ban. Both sides went close to opening the scoring in the first half with Ramires and Diego Costa being denied by Butland whilst former Stoke 'keeper Asmir Begović saved a low shot from Glen Johnson. Stoke took the lead just after half-time through an acrobatic volley from Marko Arnautović following a cross from Johnson. Pedro then hit the post and Loïc Rémy wasted a late chance and the match ended 1–0 to Stoke.

Following the international break, Stoke made the long trip to the south coast to take on Ronald Koeman's Southampton. Before the match, both sides paid tributes to the victims of the terrorist attacks in Paris. Stoke made a good start to the encounter and took the lead in the tenth minute after Bojan flicked in a low cross from Erik Pieters. Shaqiri forced Maarten Stekelenburg into a smart save whilst the Saints struggled to trouble Jack Butland. Southampton enjoyed more possession in the second half, but Stoke produced a strong defensive performance and had chances on the counterattack through Ibrahim Afellay and Marko Arnautović. Graziano Pellè had a penalty appeal turned down by referee Lee Mason and Stoke were able to secure a third away win of the season. It was also Stoke's first win at St Mary's Stadium and first win in the city of Southampton since 1980.

Stoke then came up against Sunderland at the Stadium of Light on 28 November. After a goalless first half, captain Ryan Shawcross was sent-off by Mike Dean for two bookable offences just after half time. The Black Cats took full advantage and won the match 2–0 with late goals from Patrick van Aanholt and Duncan Watmore.

=== December ===
After earning a place in the League Cup semi-finals for the first time since 1972, Stoke took on the Premier League leaders Manchester City. Hughes decided to play with no out-and-out striker, instead playing Afellay, Arnautović, Bojan and Shaqiri together for the first time. His change in tactics had an instant impact, as Shaqiri got the better of the Man City defence and crossed the ball for Arnautović to tap in. The pair combined again soon after with Arnautović poking the ball past Joe Hart to put Stoke 2–0 up after 15 minutes. Arnautović had the chance to complete his hat-trick before half-time, but his shot hit the post. The pattern of play continued into the second half with Stoke's forwards combining well but were unable to add to the scoreline. Stoke's performance earned praise from the national media as it highlighted the change in style of play introduced by Mark Hughes.

Stoke then played out an entertaining goalless draw away at West Ham United on their final league visit to the Boleyn Ground. Both sides missed the chance to win the match, with Arnautović hitting the post for Stoke and Mauro Zárate for the Hammers.

At the start of the Christmas period, Stoke took on in-form Crystal Palace at the Britannia. Palace took the lead on the stroke of half-time with Connor Wickham scoring from the penalty spot after Whelan had fouled Wilfried Zaha. Stoke equalised in the 75th minute through a Bojan penalty kick after Damien Delaney handled in the area. However, Palace were not to be denied and a long-range strike from substitute Lee Chung-yong earned the Eagles the three points.

On Boxing Day, Stoke played against Manchester United, who went into the match with speculation about the future of manager Louis van Gaal. Hughes was able to field the same team that beat Manchester City in early December and it again paid off, with Stoke winning 2–0. Firstly, Bojan scored from close-range following a defensive mistake from Memphis Depay, followed by Arnautović firing a powerful 25-yard strike past goalkeeper David de Gea.

Stoke ended 2015 with a trip to Goodison Park to play Everton in what turned out to be a thrilling match. Stoke opened the scoring through Xherdan Shaqiri, his first goal for the club, who tapped in from close following a neat passage of build up play by Stoke. Everton responded quickly, as James McCarthy played in Romelu Lukaku to poke the ball past Butland. Stoke regained the lead just before half time after Shaqiri looped a half-volley over Tim Howard. In the second half, Lukaku again brought Everton level before Gerard Deulofeu scored to turn the game in the Toffees' favour. Joselu then scored a volley to make it 3–3, while in the last minute of the match, John Stones brought down Arnautović in the penalty area, who scored the resulting spot kick to earn Stoke a dramatic 4–3 victory.

=== January ===
Stoke made a poor start to 2016, crashing to a 2–1 defeat against Midlands rivals West Bromwich Albion at The Hawthorns. After a dull first half, the Baggies took the lead through a powerful strike by Beninese winger Stéphane Sessègnon. Stoke equalized with ten minutes remaining after Walters headed in Joselu's cross, but soon after the restart, Geoff Cameron was sent-off for an altercation with Claudio Yacob. West Brom took full advantage and won the game late on with a close range finish from Jonny Evans. After the match, Stoke successfully appealed against Cameron's red card.

Stoke's first home match of 2016 was against Alex Neil's Norwich City side. After an uneventful opening 30 minutes the game changed as Gary O'Neil was sent-off for needlessly fouling Ibrahim Afellay after the ball had already gone out of play. Walters put Stoke into the lead just after half-time however the lead didn't last long as Vadis Odjidja-Ofoe set-up Jonny Howson to fire an unstoppable volley past Butland. Stoke restored their lead through Joselu before Norwich defender Ryan Bennett headed the ball into his own net to give Stoke a 3–1 victory.

Top of the table Arsenal were next to visit the Potteries on 17 January. Both sides cancelled each other out with both goalkeepers producing fine performances and the match ended in an entertaining 0–0 draw.

The final league match of January saw Stoke travel to title challengers Leicester City. Stoke had to deal with a huge loss on the half hour mark when Shawcross departed due to injury. Stoke never recovered from this set back and the Foxes maintained their title bid with an easy 3–0 win thanks to goals from Danny Drinkwater, Leonardo Ulloa and Jamie Vardy.

=== February ===
On transfer deadline day Stoke broke their club-record transfer by signing French midfielder Giannelli Imbula from Porto for £18.3 million. After being knocked out of both cup competitions Stoke returned to Premier League football on 2 February with a short trip to Old Trafford to play Manchester United. Stoke produced another poor away performance and goals from Jesse Lingard, Anthony Martial and Wayne Rooney saw Stoke suffer back-to-back 3–0 defeats.

Hughes gave new signing Imbula his debut on 6 February for the visit of Everton. Stoke endured an awful first half where goals from Séamus Coleman, Aaron Lennon and Romelu Lukaku gave the Toffees a 3–0 half-time lead. Stoke never threatened to get back into the match and succumb to a third straight 3–0 loss.

Stoke ended their four-match goal drought with a 3–1 win against Eddie Howe's AFC Bournemouth at Dean Court. The Potters took the lead through a powerful strike from Imbula before injuries to Muniesa and Johnson forced Hughes to use a makeshift defense with striker Diouf at right back and Dionatan Teixeira making a rare appearance. Goals from Ibrahim Afellay and Joselu put Stoke three-up with Matt Ritchie scoring a consolation for the Cherries.

After the Stoke squad spent a week at a training camp in Dubai, they returned to action against bottom of the table Aston Villa. After a goalless first half, Stoke went in-front through a penalty from Marko Arnautović after Ashley Westwood brought down Phil Bardsley. Stoke got a second goal soon after as a looping cross from Shaqiri was failed to be dealt with by goalkeeper Mark Bunn or the Villa defence and Arnautović was able to chest the ball over the line. Leandro Bacuna scored late on for the Villans, but the match finished 2–1.

=== March ===
Stoke then faced another team in relegation trouble at the Brit with the arrival of Steve McClaren's Newcastle United. After a largely uneventful affair, the match came to life in the final ten minutes when Shaqiri fired a 25-yard shot past Rob Elliot. Jack Butland then denied Seydou Doumbia a Newcastle equaliser before Arnautović hit the crossbar with the final kick of the match. The result was Stoke's third win a row and moved them into seventh position on 42 points.

The Potters then travelled to London to take on an improving Chelsea side under Guus Hiddink. After suffering seven-straight Premier League defeats at Stamford Bridge, Stoke managed to end that run with a 1–1 draw. Bertrand Traoré scored for the Blues in the first half before Diouf levelled for Stoke in the 85th minute.

Stoke then played Southampton on 12 March with both sides looking to close the gap on the European places. It was the Saints who claimed the three points as a first half brace from Italian striker Graziano Pellè earned Ronald Koeman's side a 2–1 victory with Arnautović scoring a consolation for Stoke. After the match Mark Hughes criticized his sides poor defending.

Stoke's final match of March took them to Vicarage Road to play Watford. The Potters produced a commanding display and won the contest 2–1 with goals from Walters and Joselu whilst Troy Deeney scored a consolation for the home side late on.

=== April ===
During the two-week international break Jack Butland suffered serious an ankle injury ruling him out for the remainder of the campaign. Jakob Haugaard made his Premier League debut in-place of Butland for the visit of Swansea City in what proved to another frustrating home match for the Potters. Afellay and Bojan put Stoke into a seemingly commanding 2–0 lead but two late goals from Gylfi Sigurðsson and Alberto Paloschi earned the Swans a 2–2 draw.

Stoke then travelled to Anfield on 10 April to take on Jürgen Klopp's Liverpool. Stoke were well beaten 4–1 with goals from Alberto Moreno, Daniel Sturridge and a brace from Divock Origi whilst a header from Bojan proved to be a mere consolation.

The Potters then suffered a second heavy defeat this time going down 4–0 at home to title challengers Tottenham Hotspur as Dele Alli and Harry Kane both scored twice.

Stoke were hit with another long-term injury as it was revealed that Ibrahim Afellay had suffered a knee ligament injury in training. The team then conceded four goals for the third match running as they lost 4–0 at Manchester City.

Stoke ended their losing run with a 1–1 draw at home to relegation threatened Sunderland on 30 April. Arnautovic scored past Vito Mannone in the 50th minute before Jermain Defoe scored a penalty kick in stoppage time.

=== May ===
The final away match of the campaign was against the 2016 FA Cup Finalists Crystal Palace at Selhurst Park. Despite Charlie Adam scoring in the first half Stoke continued with their awful end-of-season form as a second half brace from Dwight Gayle earned Palace a 2–1 win.

The last game of the 2015–16 season was against West Ham United on 15 May. The Hammers who needed a win to secure European football started well and took the lead from Michail Antonio in the 23rd minute after Stoke failed to clear a corner. West Ham threatened to extended their lead with Shay Given denying Diafra Sakho before Imbula fired in a low shot past Darren Randolph. Stoke ensured they would end the season with a victory as Mame Diouf headed in Charlie Adam's corner in the 88th minute. Stoke ended the season in ninth position with 51 points.

=== Results ===
Match	Date	Opponent	Venue	Result	Attendance	Scorers	Report
1	9 August 2015	Liverpool	H	0–1	27,654		Report
2	15 August 2015	Tottenham Hotspur	A	2–2	36,004	Arnautović 78' (pen.), Diouf 83'	Report
3	22 August 2015	Norwich City	A	1–1	26,771	Diouf 11'	Report
4	29 August 2015	West Bromwich Albion	H	0–1	26,747		Report
5	12 September 2015	Arsenal	A	0–2	59,963		Report
6	19 September 2015	Leicester City	H	2–2	27,642	Bojan 13', Walters 20'	Report
7	26 September 2015	Bournemouth	H	2–1	27,742	Walters 32', Diouf 83'	Report
8	3 October 2015	Aston Villa	A	1–0	33,189	Arnautović 55'	Report
9	19 October 2015	Swansea City	A	1–0	20,044	Bojan 4' (pen.)	Report
10	24 October 2015	Watford	H	0–2	27,587		Report
11	31 October 2015	Newcastle United	A	0–0	47,239		Report
12	7 November 2015	Chelsea	H	1–0	27,550	Arnautović 53'	Report
13	21 November 2015	Southampton	A	1–0	30,039	Bojan 10'	Report
14	28 November 2015	Sunderland	A	0–2	41,516		Report
15	5 December 2015	Manchester City	H	2–0	27,264	Arnautović (2) 7', 15'	Report
16	12 December 2015	West Ham United	A	0–0	34,857		Report
17	19 December 2015	Crystal Palace	H	1–2	27,500	Bojan 76' (pen.)	Report
18	26 December 2015	Manchester United	H	2–0	27,426	Bojan 19', Arnautović 26'	Report
19	28 December 2015	Everton	A	4–3	39,340	Shaqiri (2) 16', 45', Joselu 80', Arnautović 90+1' (pen.)	Report
20	2 January 2016	West Bromwich Albion	A	1–2	23,218	Walters 81'	Report
21	13 January 2016	Norwich City	H	3–1	27,274	Walters 49', Joselu 67', Bennett 78' (o.g.)	Report
22	17 January 2016	Arsenal	H	0–0	27,683		Report
23	23 January 2016	Leicester City	A	0–3	32,018		Report
24	2 February 2016	Manchester United	A	0–3	75,234		Report
25	6 February 2016	Everton	H	0–3	27,773		Report
26	13 February 2016	Bournemouth	A	3–1	10,863	Imbula 9', Afellay 52', Joselu 55'	Report
27	27 February 2016	Aston Villa	H	2–1	27,703	Arnautović (2) 51' (pen.), 56'	Report
28	2 March 2016	Newcastle United	H	1–0	27,331	Shaqiri 80'	Report
29	5 March 2016	Chelsea	A	1–1	41,381	Diouf 85'	Report
30	12 March 2016	Southampton	H	1–2	27,833	Arnautović 52'	Report
31	19 March 2016	Watford	A	2–1	20,759	Walters 18', Joselu 51'	Report
32	2 April 2016	Swansea City	H	2–2	27,649	Afellay 13', Bojan 53'	Report
33	10 April 2016	Liverpool	A	1–4	43,688	Bojan 22'	Report
34	18 April 2016	Tottenham Hotspur	H	0–4	27,442		Report
35	23 April 2016	Manchester City	A	0–4	53,000		Report
36	30 April 2016	Sunderland	H	1–1	27,667	Arnautović 50'	Report
37	7 May 2016	Crystal Palace	A	1–2	23,990	Adam 26'	Report
38	15 May 2016	West Ham United	H	2–1	27,721	Imbula 55', Diouf 88'	Report

=== Final league table ===
Pos	Team	Pld	W	D	L	GF	GA	GD	Pts	Qualification or relegation
7	West Ham United	38	16	14	8	65	51	+14	62	Qualification for the Europa League third qualifying round (Note: Manchester City qualified for the Europa League third qualifying round by winning the 2015–16 Football League Cup. However, since they already qualified for European competition based on their league position, the spot awarded to the League Cup winners was passed to the next best-placed team (seventh-placed West Ham United).)
8	Liverpool	38	16	12	10	63	50	+13	60	
9	Stoke City	38	14	9	15	41	55	−14	51	
10	Chelsea	38	12	14	12	59	53	+6	50	
11	Everton	38	11	14	13	59	55	+4	47	

Source: Barclays Premier League
Rules for classification: 1) Points; 2) Goal difference; 3) Goals scored; 4) Play-offs (only if needed to decide champion, teams for relegation or teams for UEFA competitions).

== FA Cup ==
Stoke were drawn away at League One side Doncaster Rovers in the third round of the 2015–16 FA Cup. For Stoke's first visit to the Keepmoat Stadium, Hughes gave Danish goalkeeper Jakob Haugaard his full debut. Stoke started well and took the lead in the 15th minute after Joselu's cross was flicked past Thorsten Stuckmann by Peter Crouch. Doncaster hit back through Nathan Tyson before a powerful second-half strike from Jonathan Walters saw the Potters progress 2–1. Stoke were drawn away against Crystal Palace in the fourth round and it proved to be a frustrating tie for Stoke as Wilfried Zaha scored the only goal of the game in the 17th minute. It got worse for Stoke after it was revealed by Mark Hughes that Marc Wilson will miss the rest of the season with a serious knee injury.

Round	Date	Opponent	Venue	Result	Attendance	Scorers	Report
R3	9 January 2016	Doncaster Rovers	A	2–1	13,299	Crouch 15', Walters 57'	Report
R4	30 January 2016	Crystal Palace	A	0–1	17,062		Report

== League Cup ==
Stoke were drawn away against League Two side Luton Town in the second round of the 2015–16 Football League Cup. It was an uneventful cup tie and after Jonathan Walters lobbed Elliot Justham it seemed that Stoke would progress without trouble. But Cameron McGeehan equalised for the Hatters in injury time to send the tie into extra time. After a goalless extra period the tie went to a penalty shootout. Luton's Scott Griffiths was the only player to miss his spot kick sending the Potters through to the third round. Stoke came up against Championship side Fulham at Craven Cottage, Peter Crouch scored the only goal of the tie to see Stoke progress to the fourth round.

In the Fourth Round Stoke faced a home match against the League Cup holders, Chelsea. After a goalless first half Stoke took the lead through Walters whose powerful shot went in off the crossbar past former Stoke 'keeper Asmir Begović. Stoke had to withstand considerable Chelsea pressure thereafter and they eventfully found an equalizer in the 90th minute through Loïc Rémy. To make matters worse for Stoke straight from the restart Phil Bardsley was sent-off for two bookable offences. Stoke were able to hold off the Blues in the extra time and the tie went to a penalty shootout. With both sides having scored all their penalties, Jack Butland saved Eden Hazard's spot kick to send Stoke into the quarter final.

Stoke were drawn at home against Championship side Sheffield Wednesday in the quarter final. Stoke produced a commanding display against the Owls and Ibrahim Afellay and Phil Bardsley both scored their first goals for the club which earned Stoke a 2–0 victory. It was the first time Stoke had reached the League Cup semi-final since they won it in 1972. Stoke were paired win Liverpool in the semi-final with the first leg at the Britannia Stadium. Liverpool came out victorious in the first leg with Jordon Ibe scoring the only goal of the game in the 37th minute. Stoke went into the second leg at knowing that had to win for the first time at Anfield since 1959 in order to progress to the final. Marko Arnautović scored the only goal of the match just before half-time and after a goalless extra time the tie went to a penalty shoot out. Marc Muniesa saw his spot kick saved in sudden death and Joe Allen scored to win the tie for Liverpool.

Round	Date	Opponent	Venue	Result	Attendance	Scorers	Report
R2	25 August 2015	Luton Town	A	1–1 (8–7 pens)	6,099	Walters 67'	Report
R3	22 September 2015	Fulham	A	1–0	9,100	Crouch 33'	Report
R4	27 October 2015	Chelsea	H	1–1 (5–4 pens)	24,886	Walters 52'	Report
R5	1 December 2015	Sheffield Wednesday	H	2–0	26,779	Afellay 30', Bardsley 75'	Report
Semi-final 1st leg	5 January 2016	Liverpool	H	0–1	27,396		Report
Semi-final 2nd leg	26 January 2016	Liverpool	A	1–0 (5–6 pens)	43,091	Arnautović 45+1'	Report

== Squad statistics ==
No.	Pos.	Name	Premier League		FA Cup		League Cup		Total		Discipline	
No.	Pos.	Name	Apps	Goals	Apps	Goals	Apps	Goals	Apps	Goals	Yellow card	Red card
1	GK	(England) Jack Butland	31	0	0	0	4	0	35	0	0	0
2	DF	(Scotland) Phil Bardsley	9(2)	0	2	0	3(1)	1	14(3)	1	4	1
3	DF	(Netherlands) Erik Pieters	35	0	1	0	5	0	41	0	11	0
5	DF	(Spain) Marc Muniesa	12(3)	0	0	0	2	0	14(3)	0	3	0
6	MF	(Republic of Ireland) Glenn Whelan	37	0	0(1)	0	3(1)	0	40(2)	0	6	0
7	MF	(Republic of Ireland) Stephen Ireland	0(13)	0	1	0	2	0	3(13)	0	2	0
8	DF	(England) Glen Johnson	25	0	0(1)	0	3	0	28(1)	0	1	0
9	FW	(Nigeria) Peter Odemwingie	0(5)	0	1	0	1(1)	0	2(6)	0	0	0
10	FW	(Austria) Marko Arnautović	33(1)	11	0	0	5(1)	1	38(2)	12	2	0
11	FW	(Spain) Joselu	10(12)	4	2	0	0(3)	0	12(15)	4	0	0
12	DF	(Republic of Ireland) Marc Wilson	1(3)	0	2	0	3(1)	0	6(4)	0	2	0
14	MF	(Netherlands) Ibrahim Afellay	24(7)	2	0	0	5	1	29(7)	3	3	1
15	MF	(Netherlands) Marco van Ginkel	8(9)	0	2	0	1(1)	0	11(10)	0	2	0
16	MF	(Scotland) Charlie Adam	12(10)	1	1	0	1(1)	0	14(11)	1	6	1
17	DF	(England) Ryan Shawcross (c)	20	0	1	0	2	0	23	0	4	1
18	FW	(Senegal) Mame Biram Diouf	12(14)	5	1(1)	0	1(1)	0	14(16)	5	3	0
19	FW	(Republic of Ireland) Jonathan Walters	18(9)	5	1	1	4(1)	2	23(10)	8	2	0
20	DF	(United States) Geoff Cameron	27(3)	0	0	0	3(1)	0	30(4)	0	0	1
21	MF	(England) Steve Sidwell	0(1)	0	0(1)	0	2	0	2(2)	0	1	0
21	MF	(France) Giannelli Imbula	14	2	0	0	0	0	14	2	4	0
22	MF	(Switzerland) Xherdan Shaqiri	27	3	1	0	1(3)	0	29(3)	3	3	0
23	DF	(Slovakia) Dionatan Teixeira	0(1)	0	0	0	0	0	0(1)	0	0	0
24	GK	(Republic of Ireland) Shay Given	3	0	0	0	2	0	5	0	1	0
25	FW	(England) Peter Crouch	4(7)	0	1(1)	1	4(1)	1	9(9)	2	1	0
26	DF	(Germany) Philipp Wollscheid	30(1)	0	2	0	6	0	38(1)	0	3	0
27	FW	(Spain) Bojan	22(5)	7	1	0	3	0	26(5)	7	2	0
29	GK	(Denmark) Jakob Haugaard	4(1)	0	2	0	0	0	6(1)	0	0	0
34	MF	(England) Ollie Shenton	0	0	0	0	0	0	0	0	0	0
–	–	Own goals	–	1	–	0	–	0	–	1	–	–

== Transfers ==
=== In ===
Date	Pos.	Name	From	Fee	Ref.
1 July 2015	DF	(Germany) Philipp Wollscheid	(Germany) Bayer Leverkusen	£2.75 million	
1 July 2015	GK	(Denmark) Jakob Haugaard	(Denmark) Midtjylland	Undisclosed	
16 June 2015	FW	(Spain) Joselu	(Germany) Hannover 96	£5.75 million	
10 July 2015	GK	(Republic of Ireland) Shay Given	(England) Aston Villa	Free	
12 July 2015	DF	(England) Glen Johnson	(England) Liverpool	Free	
15 July 2015	MF	(Morocco) Moha El Ouriachi	(Spain) Barcelona	Free	
20 July 2015	FW	(England) Dom Telford	(England) Blackpool	Compensation	
20 July 2015	MF	(England) Mark Waddington	(England) Blackpool	Compensation	
27 July 2015	MF	(Netherlands) Ibrahim Afellay	(Spain) Barcelona	Free	
4 August 2015	MF	(Spain) Sergio Molina	(Spain) Real Madrid	Free	
11 August 2015	MF	(Switzerland) Xherdan Shaqiri	(Italy) Inter Milan	£12 million	
1 February 2016	MF	(France) Giannelli Imbula	(Portugal) Porto	£18.3 million	

=== Out ===
Date	Pos.	Name	To	Fee	Ref.
30 June 2015	MF	(Honduras) Wilson Palacios	Released	Free	
30 June 2015	GK	(Denmark) Thomas Sørensen	(Australia) Melbourne City	Free	
30 June 2015	DF	(England) Andy Wilkinson	Released	Free	
30 June 2015	FW	(England) Tomi Adeloye	Released	Free	
30 June 2015	FW	(England) James Alabi	(England) Ipswich Town	Free	
30 June 2015	DF	(England) Sam Coulson	Retired		
30 June 2015	DF	(Australia) Alex Grant	(Australia) Perth Glory	Free	
30 June 2015	MF	(Wales) Robbie Parry	Released	Free	
30 June 2015	FW	(England) Nathan Ricketts-Hopkinson	Released	Free	
30 June 2015	MF	(England) Adam Thomas	Released	Free	
30 June 2015	MF	(England) Charlie Ward	Released	Free	
30 June 2015	DF	(England) Eillot Wheeler	Released	Free	
1 July 2015	DF	(Germany) Robert Huth	(England) Leicester City	£3 million	
9 July 2015	MF	(France) Steven Nzonzi	(Spain) Sevilla	£7 million	
10 July 2015	MF	(Scotland) Jamie Ness	(England) Scunthorpe United	Free	
13 July 2015	GK	(Bosnia and Herzegovina) Asmir Begović	(England) Chelsea	£8 million	
4 February 2016	GK	(Bermuda) Dale Eve	(England) Forest Green Rovers	Free	

=== Loan in ===
Date from	Date to	Pos.	Name	From	Ref.
10 July 2015	1 February 2016	MF	(Netherlands) Marco van Ginkel	(England) Chelsea	

=== Loan out ===
Date from	Date to	Pos.	Name	To	Ref.
25 July 2015	1 September 2015	GK	(Austria) Daniel Bachmann	(Scotland) Ross County	
28 July 2015	25 August 2015	DF	(Republic of Ireland) Mason Watkins-Clark	(Wales) Wrexham	
3 October 2015	2 November 2015	DF	(Slovakia) Dionatan Teixeira	(England) Fleetwood Town	
28 October 2015	1 January 2016	GK	(Austria) Daniel Bachmann	(England) Bury	
25 January 2016	30 June 2016	MF	(England) Steve Sidwell	(England) Brighton & Hove Albion	
25 January 2016	25 February 2016	MF	(France) Eddy Lecygne	(England) Doncaster Rovers	
11 March 2016	30 June 2016	FW	(Nigeria) Peter Odemwingie	(England) Bristol City	
