= Ryan Shawcross =

English footballer (born 1987)

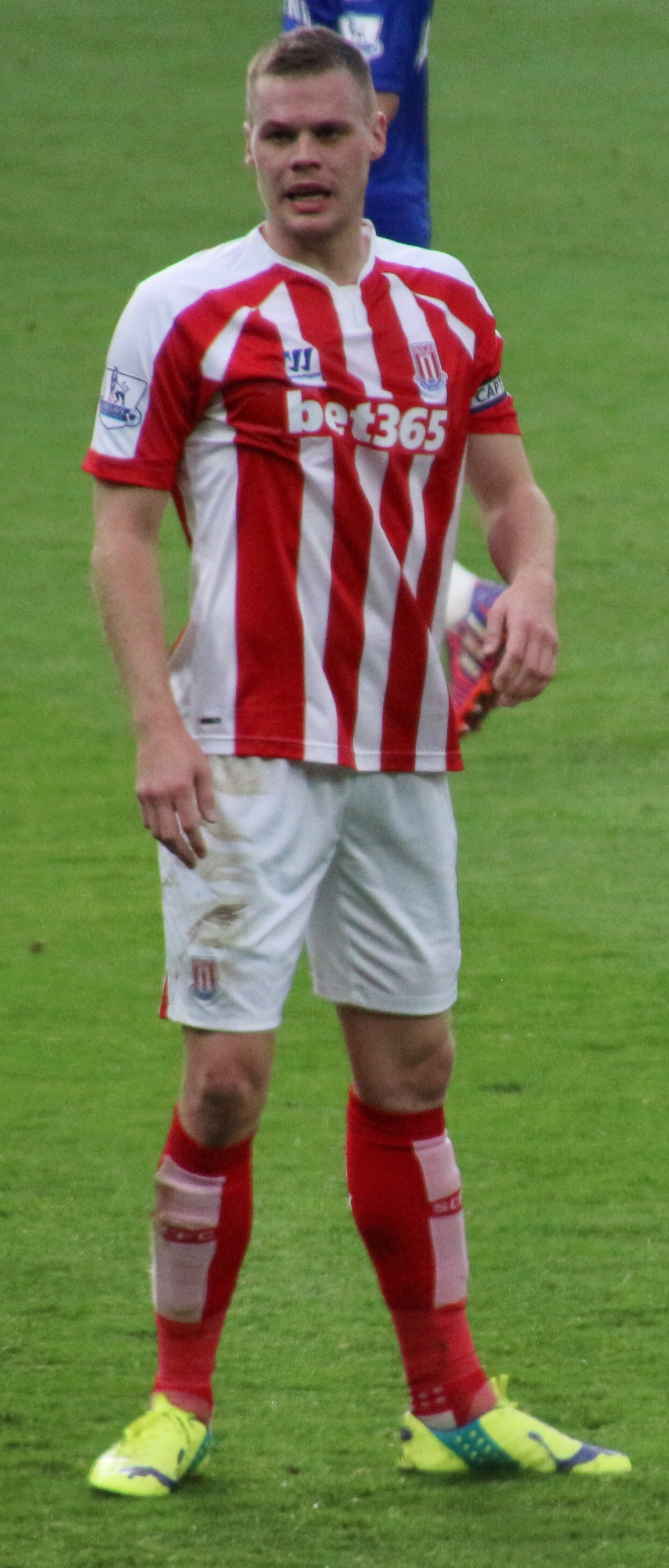
- Shawcross with Stoke City in 2015

Personal information
- Full name: Ryan James Shawcross
- Date of birth: 4 October 1987 (age 39)
- Place of birth: Chester, England
- Height: 6 ft 3 in (1.91 m)
- Position: Centre-back

Team information
- Current team: Stoke City (First-team coach)

Youth career
- Buckley Town
- 2002–2006: Manchester United

Senior career*
Years	Team	Apps	(Gls)
2006–2008	Manchester United	0	(0)
2007	→ Royal Antwerp (loan)	22	(3)
2007–2008	→ Stoke City (loan)	26	(6)
2008–2021	Stoke City	375	(16)
2021–2022	Inter Miami	12	(0)
Total		435	(25)

International career
2008	England U21	2	(0)
2012	England	1	(0)

Managerial career
- 2024–2025: Stoke City U21
- 2024: Stoke City (caretaker)
- 2024–2025: Stoke City (caretaker)
- 2025–: Stoke City (first-team coach)
- * Club domestic league appearances and goals

Ryan James Shawcross (born 4 October 1987) is an English former professional footballer who played as a centre-back. He is currently the first-team coach at Stoke City.

Shawcross began his career with Manchester United and made his debut for the club against Crewe Alexandra in the League Cup; he then spent time on loan at Belgian feeder club Royal Antwerp. He joined Championship club Stoke City on loan in August 2007 and made an instant impact scoring on his debut against Cardiff City. His good form prompted Stoke to pay Manchester United £1 million in January 2008 to keep him at the Britannia Stadium. He formed a good defensive partnership with Leon Cort as Stoke gained promotion to the Premier League for the first time, ending 23 years away from the top flight.

Despite making a bad start to Premier League football, Shawcross established himself as first-choice centre-back along with Abdoulaye Faye. Stoke comfortably stayed up, and after another mid-table finish in 2009–10, Shawcross was handed the captaincy by manager Tony Pulis ahead of the 2010–11 season. With Faye drifting out of the team, Robert Huth became Shawcross's defensive partner and the team reached the 2011 FA Cup Final, finishing runners-up to Manchester City. The run to the final also meant that Stoke entered the UEFA Europa League in 2011–12, and they reached the round of 32 losing to Spanish team Valencia. Shawcross continued to be a regular under Pulis in 2012–13 and then under Mark Hughes in 2013–14 which saw him win the player of the year award. Shawcross remained at Stoke until February 2021, after making 453 appearances over a 14-year period with the club. He ended his career with Inter Miami before retiring from playing in January 2022 and began coaching.

== Early life ==
Born in Chester, Cheshire, Shawcross grew up in the Welsh town of Buckley, Flintshire where he attended Mountain Lane Primary School and Elfed High School. While living in Buckley, Shawcross played in the youth team at Cymru Alliance club Buckley Town.

During his primary school days, Shawcross played representative level football for Flintshire Boys; this team counts Gary Speed, Michael Owen and Ian Rush amongst its former players. When Shawcross was 15 years old, he and a number of Flintshire Boys players had a trial at Football League club Wrexham who offered contracts to some players but not to Shawcross. However, just three weeks later, he had a trial at Manchester United and was offered a contract at their academy.

== Club career ==
=== Manchester United ===
Shawcross progressed through the youth teams at Manchester United and made his first-team debut on 25 October 2006 as a substitute for fellow debutant Michael Barnes in a 2–1 League Cup third round win away at Crewe Alexandra. He also came on in the final minute of a 1–0 defeat to Southend United in the next round. In January 2007, he was sent on loan to Belgian club Royal Antwerp, where he appeared regularly, and helped Antwerp to make it into the Belgian Second Division play-offs, scoring three goals, before returning to Manchester in the summer.

=== Stoke City ===
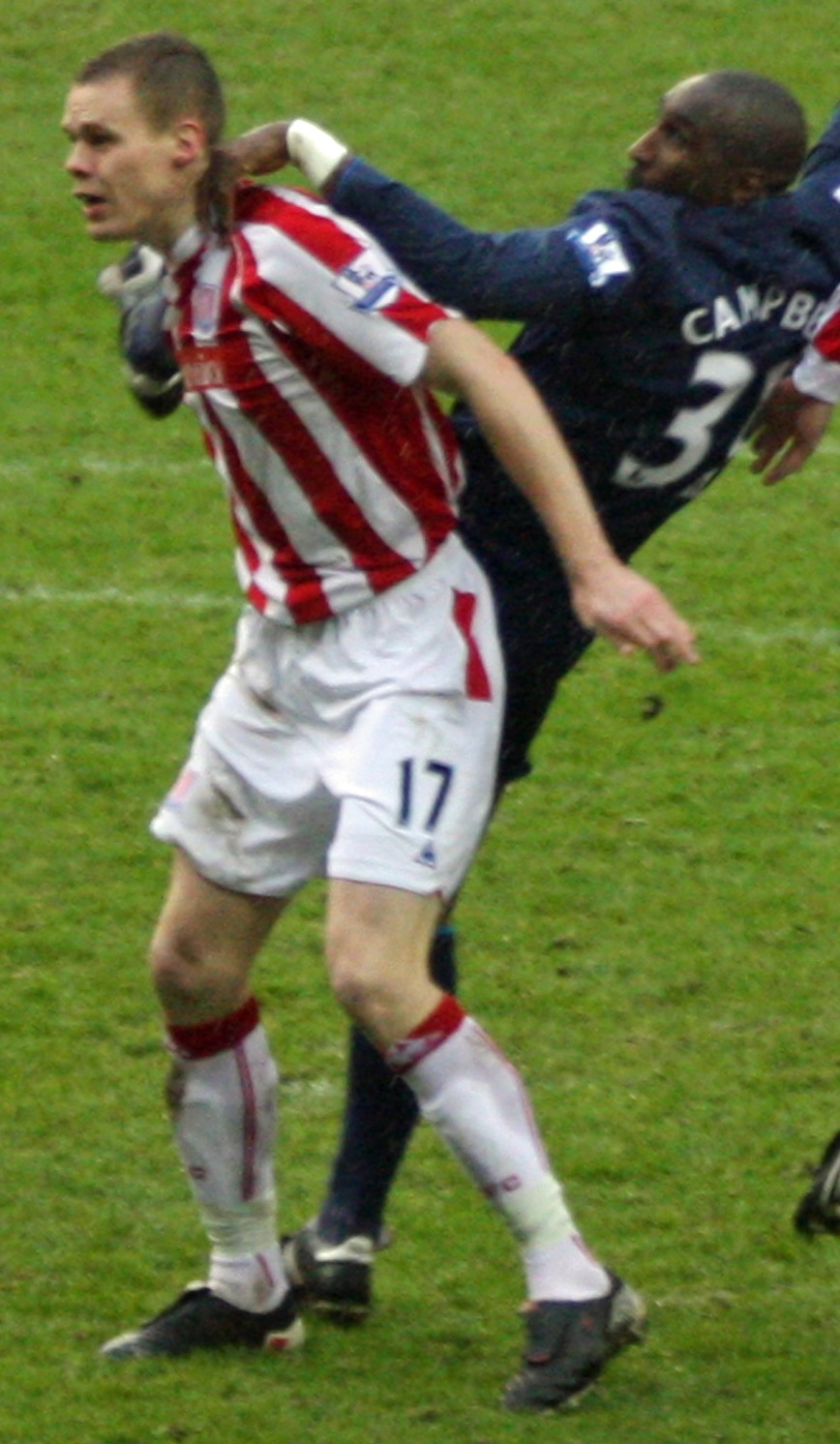
Shawcross (left) playing for Stoke City in 2010

On 9 August 2007, Shawcross was sent on loan again, this time to Championship club Stoke City, for six months. He scored his first two goals for Stoke during his first two matches, one on his debut during a 1–0 win on the opening day of the season, against Cardiff City, with the other during a League Cup match against Rochdale in which Stoke lost on penalties. After Stoke's 2–1 win over Charlton Athletic Shawcross expressed his delight at Stoke's early season form. Shawcross was named as the Championship's player of the month for October 2007.

Stoke made advances to make Shawcross' loan permanent during the January 2008 transfer window, and the move was finally completed on 18 January 2008, with Stoke paying Manchester United an initial £1m, which eventually rose to a club record £2m due to Shawcross' appearances for Stoke and the team achieving promotion the following May. Additionally, Alex Ferguson negotiated a clause that gives Manchester United first refusal on any offer for the player. He lost his place in the team for the final few matches of the promotion winning season to loan signing Chris Riggott. Although he did play in the final match against Leicester City. At the end of the 2007–08 season, Shawcross was named in the Championship PFA Team of the Year along with teammates Ricardo Fuller and Liam Lawrence.

After starting in Stoke's first match in the Premier League in a 3–1 defeat away at Bolton Wanderers Shawcross lost his place in the team to new signing Ibrahima Sonko and he stated that he might have to leave Stoke if the manager signed another defender. Shawcross re-claimed his place in team in late 2008 due to Sonko's poor performances. In a match against Arsenal in November 2008, a Shawcross off-the-pitch tackle led to a three-week injury to Emmanuel Adebayor. Following his return to the team, Shawcross scored in matches against Aston Villa, Everton, and Middlesbrough. The goal against Boro proved to be vital win for Stoke in the fight from relegation. After a fine debut Premier League season, Shawcross was linked to several clubs Premier League rivals however both Shawcross and Stoke manager Tony Pulis dismissed this speculation.

He scored from a header in Stoke's first match of the 2009–10 season, helping them to a 2–0 win over Burnley. On 12 December 2009, he scored his second goal in the 2009–10 season for Stoke against Wigan Athletic in a 2–2 draw. Shawcross was again involved in an incident with Emmanuel Adebayor in a FA Cup fifth-round replay against Manchester City, Adebayor struck Shawcross in the face and was sent-off. Shawcross went on to score Stoke's second goal in a 3–1 win. On 27 February 2010, in a match against Arsenal, Shawcross was sent off after his tackle left Arsenal midfielder Aaron Ramsey with a broken leg. Shawcross himself wept when he saw the extent of the injury to Ramsey, who had to be stretchered off and taken to hospital. Shawcross, who apologised via text message, was defended by his teammates Danny Pugh and Rory Delap after the match. On the same day, Shawcross received a call-up to the England national team.

Shawcross was given the Stoke City captaincy for the 2010–11 season, taking over from Abdoulaye Faye. After a number of impressive performances for Stoke Shawcross has again been linked with a move away from the Britannia Stadium, however City chairman Peter Coates issued a 'Hand off warning'. He scored his first goal for almost a year in the FA Cup against Brighton & Hove Albion. Stoke beat West Ham United in the quarter-final and Shawcross has said he will be proud to lead out Stoke City at Wembley Stadium in the semi-final against Bolton Wanderers. Stoke beat Bolton 5–0 to earn a place in the 2011 FA Cup Final, the club's first appearance in a FA Cup Final. Shawcross therefore became the first Stoke captain to play in a FA Cup Final, losing to Manchester City. Despite the defeat, Stoke were able to claim a place in the UEFA Europa League.

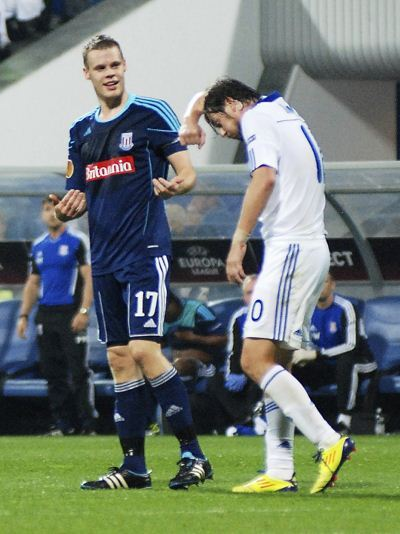
Shawcross (wearing 17 short) playing for Stoke City in a UEFA Europa League match against FC Dynamo Kyiv in 2011.

Prior to the start of the 2011–12 season, manager Tony Pulis confirmed that Shawcross would remain as club captain. He had a busy season playing in 49 of the club's 56 fixtures, helping the club reach the last 32 of the Europa League and the quarter-final of the FA Cup. He was named as captain for a third season running, with Pulis warning Shawcross against complacency. In a Premier League match against Everton on 15 December 2012 Shawcross was deliberately headbutted by Marouane Fellaini which was missed by referee Mark Halsey. After the match Fellaini issued a public apology to Shawcross and was given a retrospective three match ban. On 3 January 2013, Shawcross signed a 5 1/2-year contract extension with the "Potters", keeping him at the Britannia Stadium until the summer of 2018. After agreeing to his new contract, Tony Pulis stated that Shawcross could go on to become a legend at the club. He played in 40 matches in 2012–13 season, scoring once against Wigan Athletic as Stoke finished in 13th position.

At the end of the 2012–13 season, Tony Pulis was dismissed and replaced by Mark Hughes, who decided that Shawcross would retain the captaincy for a fifth season. On 24 August 2013 Shawcross scored the winning goal against Crystal Palace which earned City their first win of the 2013–14 season. On 12 April 2014 Shawcross made his 200th appearance in the Premier League becoming the first Stoke player to reach that milestone. Shawcross missed just one match in 2013–14 as Stoke finished in 9th position in the Premier League and he also won the player of the year award.

Shawcross scored Stoke's first goal of the 2014–15 season in a 1–1 draw with Hull City on 24 August 2014. Against Swansea City on 29 October 2014, Shawcross was penalised by referee Michael Oliver for holding Wilfried Bony at a corner. This prompted Mark Hughes to take Shawcross off man-marking duties at set-plays. He made his 300th appearance for Stoke on 29 November against Liverpool. On 1 January 2015 he scored against his former club Manchester United in a 1–1 draw. He missed February and most of March with a back injury. He played 37 times for Stoke in 2014–15 as the Potters finished in 9th position for a second season running and they ended the campaign with a 6–1 victory against Liverpool.

Shawcross was ruled out for the first two months of the 2015–16 season after undergoing back surgery. He returned from injury on 27 October 2015 playing in a League Cup victory against Chelsea. However his season was continually disrupted by his back injury restricting him to 23 appearances as Stoke again finished in ninth position. Shawcross scored his first goal for two years on 3 January 2017 in a 2–0 win against Watford. Shawcross missed just three matches in 2016–17 playing 38 times as Stoke finished in 13th position.

Shawcross signed a new four-year contract with Stoke on 31 August 2017. Shawcross made 27 appearances in 2017–18 as Stoke suffered relegation to the Championship, ending their ten-year spell in the Premier League. He played 36 times in 2018–19 as Stoke failed to mount a promotion challenge, finishing in 16th position. His only goal of the campaign came in the final match against Sheffield United.

Shawcross suffered a serious injury on 27 July 2019 in a pre-season friendly against Leicester City. He then underwent surgery after scans revealed that had broken his fibula, ruling him out for up to four months. He returned to training in November 2019 making several appearances for the under-23 side. Shawcross made his return against Luton Town on 10 December 2019 but lasted only 14 minutes after picking up a groin injury. He returned on boxing day against Sheffield Wednesday but in the next match at Fulham he suffered another calf injury. The 2019–20 season was suspended in March 2020 due to the COVID-19 pandemic and Shawcross was able to return to training. He started the first match of the restart on 20 June 2020 at Reading but was again unable to complete the match and was later ruled out for the remainder of the campaign.

Shawcross' injury problems continued in 2020–21 which saw him make just two substitute appearances in December 2020. Shawcross' contract was cancelled by mutual consent on 19 February 2021 ahead of a move to Inter Miami CF in the United States. In total Shawcross spent 14 years with Stoke, making 453 appearances and is eighth on the club's all-time record appearance list.

=== Inter Miami ===
On 20 February 2021, Shawcross joined Major League Soccer club Inter Miami. In August 2021, Shawcross suffered a season-ending back injury and ultimately retired from playing in January 2022.

== International career ==
In January 2008, Shawcross won his first call up to the England under-21 squad for a 2009 UEFA European Under-21 Championship qualification match against the Republic of Ireland. Shawcross previously played for the Wales under-15 team, against Belgium and the Republic of Ireland. Following Shawcross' fine form in his debut Premier League season, Tony Pulis, his manager at Stoke, tipped Shawcross to break into the England senior team.

In September 2009, it was announced that changes have been proposed to the eligibility criteria for British players, which would make Shawcross eligible to play for Wales. Wales under-21 coach Brian Flynn commented that "People who grew up in Wales often can't represent the country they've lived in most of their life because their nearest maternity hospital is in England". In October 2009, FIFA ratified the changes to allow players with five years of compulsory education in a country before the age of 16 to represent that country. Despite this, Shawcross was named in an England squad for the first time for their match against Egypt in March 2010. He was named in the matchday squad but was an unused substitute. Shawcross has been backed by his defensive partner, Robert Huth to earn an England call-up. In July 2011 Shawcross confirmed that he will not consider playing for Wales.

On 11 July 2012, Wales national team manager Chris Coleman said he would consult Arsenal and Wales team ex-captain Aaron Ramsey regarding the possibility of Shawcross playing for Wales. However, Shawcross again stated that his only international ambition was to play for England.

Shawcross was called up to the England team by Roy Hodgson on 4 October 2012 for the 2014 FIFA World Cup qualifiers against Poland and San Marino. He made his England debut in a friendly against Sweden on 14 November 2012 at the Friends Arena, coming on as a 74th-minute substitute for Steven Caulker. During Shawcross' 16 minutes on the pitch Swedish striker Zlatan Ibrahimović scored a hat-trick which included a 30-yard bicycle kick. Shawcross was not called up again by Roy Hodgson and claimed in March 2016 said that Ibrahimović had ended his England career before it had started.

== Coaching career ==
Shawcross began coaching in 2022, joining Inter Miami's MLS Next Pro affiliate Inter Miami II as an assistant coach. Shawcross returned to England in May 2023. In June 2023 he became academy coach with Stoke City U18s, moving up to the under-21s a year later. On 16 September 2024, after Steven Schumacher was sacked, Shawcross and Alex Morris became caretaker managers, overseeing one game against Fleetwood Town in the EFL Cup before Narcís Pèlach was announced as Stoke's new manager on 18 September 2024. Pèlach left Stoke in December 2024 and Shawcross took caretaker charge. In January 2025 Shawcross was appointed first-team-coach to new manager Mark Robins.

== Personal life ==
Shawcross lived in Miami with his wife Kath. The couple have three children. He has been involved in charity work.

== Career statistics ==
=== Club ===
Appearances and goals by club, season and competition
Club	Season	League			National Cup (Note: Includes Belgian Cup and FA Cup)		League Cup (Note: Includes League/EFL Cup)		Other		Total	
Club	Season	Division	Apps	Goals	Apps	Goals	Apps	Goals	Apps	Goals	Apps	Goals
Manchester United	2006–07	Premier League	0	0	—		2	0	0	0	2	0
Manchester United	2007–08	Premier League	—		—		—		0	0	0	0
Manchester United	Total		0	0	—		2	0	0	0	2	0
Royal Antwerp (loan)	2006–07	Belgian Second Division	22	3	3	0	—		—		25	3
Stoke City	2007–08	Championship	41	7	2	0	1	1	—		44	8
Stoke City	2008–09	Premier League	29	3	1	0	3	0	—		33	3
Stoke City	2009–10	Premier League	28	2	3	1	0	0	—		31	3
Stoke City	2010–11	Premier League	36	1	5	1	3	0	—		44	2
Stoke City	2011–12	Premier League	36	2	4	0	1	0	8 (Note: Appearances in UEFA Europa League)	0	49	2
Stoke City	2012–13	Premier League	37	1	3	0	0	0	—		40	1
Stoke City	2013–14	Premier League	37	1	2	0	4	0	—		43	1
Stoke City	2014–15	Premier League	32	2	2	0	3	0	—		37	2
Stoke City	2015–16	Premier League	20	0	1	0	2	0	—		23	0
Stoke City	2016–17	Premier League	35	1	1	0	2	0	—		38	1
Stoke City	2017–18	Premier League	27	1	0	0	0	0	—		27	1
Stoke City	2018–19	Championship	36	1	0	0	0	0	—		36	1
Stoke City	2019–20	Championship	5	0	0	0	0	0	—		5	0
Stoke City	2020–21	Championship	2	0	1	0	0	0	—		3	0
Stoke City	Total		401	22	25	2	19	1	8	0	453	25
Inter Miami	2021	Major League Soccer	12	0	0	0	—		0	0	12	0
Career total			435	25	28	2	21	1	8	0	492	28

=== International ===
Appearances and goals by national team and year
National team	Year	Apps	Goals
England	2012	1	0
Total		1	0

== Managerial statistics ==
As of match played 1 January 2025

Managerial record by team and tenure
Team	From	To	Record				
Team	From	To	P	W	D	L	Win %
Stoke City (caretaker)	16 September 2024	18 September 2024	1	0	1	0	0.0
Stoke City (caretaker)	27 December 2024	1 January 2025	2	1	1	0	50.0
Total			3	1	2	0	33.3

== Honours ==
Stoke City

- Football League Championship second-place promotion: 2007–08
- FA Cup runner-up: 2010–11

Individual

- Football League Championship Player of the Month: October 2007
- PFA Team of the Year: 2007–08 Championship
- Stoke City Player of the Year: 2013–14
