= Jack Butland =

English footballer (born 1993)

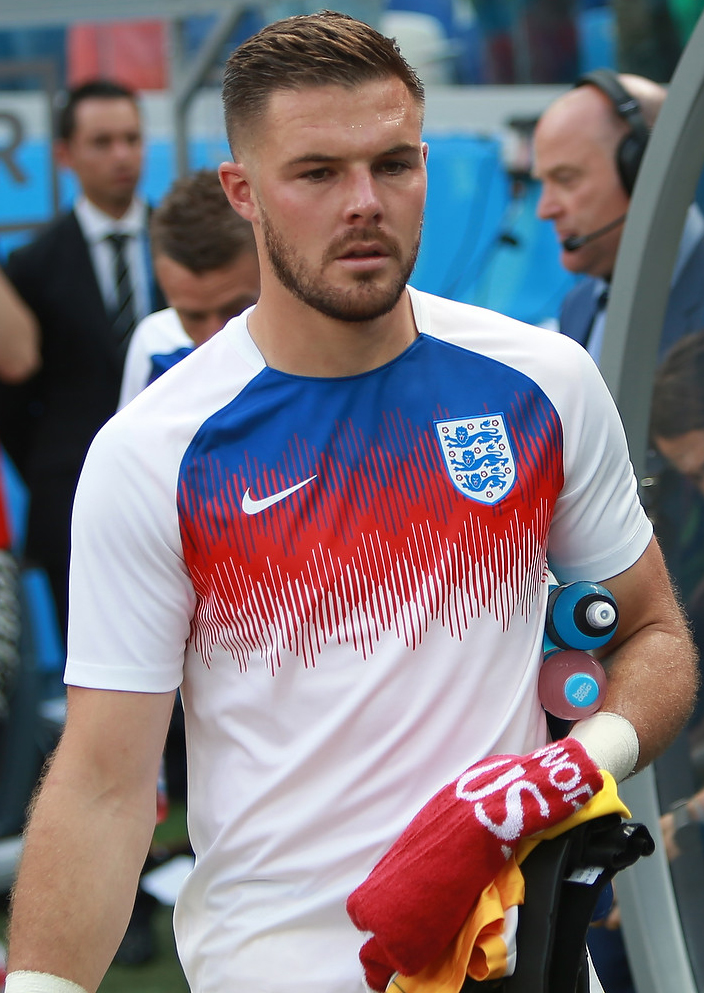
- Butland with England at the 2018 FIFA World Cup

Personal information
- Full name: Jack Butland
- Date of birth: 10 March 1993 (age 33)
- Place of birth: Bristol, England
- Height: 6 ft 5 in (1.96 m)
- Position: Goalkeeper

Team information
- Current team: Hull City
- Number: 1

Youth career
- Clevedon United
- 2007–2010: Birmingham City

Senior career*
Years	Team	Apps	(Gls)
2010–2013	Birmingham City	29	(0)
2011	→ Cheltenham Town (loan)	12	(0)
2012	→ Cheltenham Town (loan)	12	(0)
2013–2020	Stoke City	157	(0)
2013	→ Birmingham City (loan)	17	(0)
2013	→ Barnsley (loan)	13	(0)
2014	→ Leeds United (loan)	16	(0)
2014	→ Derby County (loan)	6	(0)
2020–2023	Crystal Palace	10	(0)
2023	→ Manchester United (loan)	0	(0)
2023–2026	Rangers	102	(0)
2026–	Hull City	0	(0)

International career
2008–2009	England U16	4	(0)
2009–2010	England U17	9	(0)
2010–2011	England U19	4	(0)
2011–2014	England U20	7	(0)
2011–2015	England U21	28	(0)
2012	Great Britain Olympic	5	(0)
2012–2018	England	9	(0)
Medal record
Men's football
Representing England
UEFA Nations League
Third place	2019 Portugal
UEFA European Under-17 Championship
Winner	2010 Liechtenstein
- * Club domestic league appearances and goals as of 10 May 2026

Jack Butland (born 10 March 1993) is an English professional footballer who plays as a goalkeeper for Premier League club Hull City.

Butland began his career with Birmingham City, and made his debut in the Football League in September 2011 while on loan to League Two club Cheltenham Town. Butland established himself as first choice keeper at Birmingham in 2012–13 and was transferred to then-Premier League club Stoke City in January 2013 for a fee of £3.3 million. He was loaned back to Birmingham and went on to play in every league match in 2012–13. Butland then spent time out on loan at Barnsley before making his Premier League debut in January 2014. He had loan spells with Leeds United and Derby County in 2014 before he became Stoke's number one in 2015–16. Butland spent seven seasons at Stoke, winning their player of the year award twice. He joined Crystal Palace in 2020, but did not play regularly. After a loan spell with Manchester United in the second half of the 2022–23 season, he agreed to sign for Rangers.

At international level, he represented England at all age-group levels, playing for the under-17 team that won the 2010 European championships and for the under-20s at the 2011 FIFA U-20 World Cup. He was part of the England squad at UEFA Euro 2012, and later that year was the first-choice goalkeeper for the Great Britain team at the Summer Olympics. He became the youngest goalkeeper to play for the senior England team when he made his debut in August 2012, and went on to make nine appearances.

== Club career ==
=== Birmingham City ===
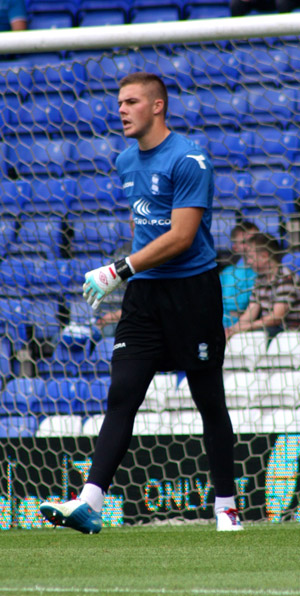
Butland with Birmingham City in 2012

==== Early career ====
Butland was born in Southmead, Bristol, and raised in nearby Clevedon where he attended Yeo Moor Primary School and Clevedon Community School. After playing for Clevedon United and the Bristol-based Jamie Shore Academy, he joined Birmingham City as a schoolboy in 2007 and began a two-year scholarship in the club's youth academy when he left school in 2009. During his time at school Butland was a keen rugby player. While still aged 16, Butland made his reserve-team debut, and he signed his first professional contract, of two and a half years, as soon as he turned 17 in March 2010. Named Birmingham City's Young Player of the Year at the end of the 2009–10 season, his progress was interrupted in October 2010 by a broken hand requiring surgery. By the following April he had recovered well enough to be given a first-team squad number before the Premier League match against Wolverhampton Wanderers as cover, in case Ben Foster's injury or Colin Doyle's illness prevented either from taking part in the match.

==== Cheltenham Town loan ====
Soon after Butland made his England under-21 debut in September 2011, he joined League Two club Cheltenham Town on loan for a month to gain experience of first-team football. He went straight into the starting eleven to make his Football League debut at home to Macclesfield Town on 10 September 2011, displacing Scott Brown who had until then made 107 consecutive starts for the club. Butland had little to do as Cheltenham won the match 2–0. While still out on loan, Butland signed a new contract with Birmingham to expire in June 2015. The initial month was later extended by a further two months, to begin after his return from under-21 duty in mid-October. Butland was short-listed for November's League Two Player of the Month award, and finished his loan spell with seven clean sheets from his twelve appearances. Cheltenham teammate Steve Elliot suggested that Butland had "everything he needs to play at the very top level", and where some players lack the attitude required to succeed, "Jack's head is screwed on, he knows what he wants and what he has to do to get there."

In February 2012, Butland rejoined Cheltenham on a youth loan until the end of the season. He went straight into the starting eleven, and kept a clean sheet against AFC Wimbledon to help maintain Cheltenham in the automatic promotion positions. After Birmingham's first-choice goalkeeper, Boaz Myhill, injured a thumb, Butland was recalled by his parent club with three matches remaining in the regular season. Over his two spells with Cheltenham, he conceded 26 goals from 24 League Two appearances, and was regularly scouted by bigger clubs; the Daily Telegraph reported that "no fewer than 52 scouts" had watched him at one match.

==== First-team breakthrough ====
Butland was on the bench for the last few matches of Birmingham's 2011–12 season as the club reached the play-off semi-finals. During the close season, Birmingham were reported to have turned down a bid of £6 million for the player from Southampton, newly promoted to the Premier League. Manager Lee Clark made it clear that it would take a "crazy" offer for him to be sold. Butland himself stated that he wanted regular first-team football for the coming season, and after Ben Foster's departure for West Bromwich Albion during the close season, he was given squad number 1 for 2012–13. He finally played his first competitive match for Birmingham – three days after his full England debut – on the opening day of the 2012–13 Football League season, in a 1–1 draw at home to Charlton Athletic.

After a potential sale of the club fell through in December, the chairman confirmed that player sales would be needed in the transfer window to relieve Birmingham's financial difficulties. Butland told the club that he was not prepared to leave for a club where he would not be playing regular first-team football, and was reported to have rejected the chance to speak to European champions Chelsea about a possible transfer. Lee Clark felt that Butland's determination to play football ahead of "profile and financial rewards" reflected the player's "unbelievable maturity", and suggested that Birmingham had lost potentially "the best goalkeeper in Europe". Butland was ever-present in league matches for the 2012–13 season, and was voted Birmingham's Young Player of the Year.

=== Stoke City ===
Butland signed a four-and-a-half-year contract with Premier League club Stoke City on 31 January 2013. As part of the deal, he returned to Birmingham City on loan for the remainder of the season. According to Stoke, the fee was an initial £3.3 million, rising to £3.5 million. On his return to Stoke for the 2013–14 season, he found himself third choice behind Asmir Begović and Thomas Sørensen, and on 26 September, he joined Championship club Barnsley on a three-month emergency loan. With Barnsley's only other fit goalkeeper an inexperienced 19-year-old, Butland went straight into the starting eleven for their next match, a 2–1 defeat at Leicester City in which he brought down Jamie Vardy to concede a penalty and was perhaps fortunate to receive only a yellow card. Butland made 13 appearances for Barnsley before being recalled by Stoke on 26 December 2013 after Asmir Begović suffered an injury. On 1 January 2014, Butland made his Premier League debut for the Potters, replacing injured keeper Thomas Sørensen at half time against Everton; the match ended as a 1–1 draw. Butland made his first league start on 12 January 2014 against Liverpool which ended in a 5–3 defeat.

On 20 February 2014, Butland joined Championship club Leeds United for the remainder of the 2013–14 season. Stoke manager Mark Hughes believed the move was important for Butland to gain more first-team experience stating that "this opportunity to go to Leeds, where they have a big fanbase and big expectations will be another good step for him." With injury to Leeds' first-choice keeper Paddy Kenny, Butland went straight into the first team, made his debut in a 0–0 draw with Middlesbrough, and was named man of the match. Butland had a tough time with Leeds: he conceded 28 goals in 16 appearances as the team finished in 15th position.

On 20 October 2014 Butland joined Derby County on a one-month loan. He played six times for the Rams before returning to Stoke. Butland became back-up to Asmir Begović in the 2014–15 campaign, playing in League Cup and FA Cup matches, and in March 2015 his contract was extended until the summer of 2019. Butland played in three matches in May 2015, keeping clean sheets against Tottenham Hotspur and Burnley.

Following the sale of Begović, Butland was handed the number one shirt by Mark Hughes ahead of the 2015–16 season. Butland impressed in a 1–1 draw with Norwich City on 22 August 2015. On 27 October, in the fourth round of the League Cup, he saved from Eden Hazard as Stoke defeated Chelsea in a penalty shootout after a 1–1 draw. Four days later, Butland was widely praised for another man of the match display as Stoke drew 0–0 with Newcastle United. In March 2016 Butland's contract with the Potters was extended until the summer of 2021. He was ever-present until 26 March, when he suffered a fractured ankle whilst playing for England against Germany, ruling him out for the remainder of the season. Butland made 35 appearances for Stoke in 2015–16 and his performances earned him the club's player of the year award.

Butland returned from injury in time for the 2016–17 pre-season. However, he missed the opening matches of the season and underwent further surgery on his ankle in September 2016 and again in December 2016, when Hughes revealed the player might miss the rest of the season. He was eventually given the green light to return to training by a specialist in March 2017. He made his return from injury on 22 April against Swansea City. Butland played in the final five matches of the 2016–17 season, keeping two clean sheets as Stoke finished in 13th position. Butland played 36 times in 2017–18 as Stoke were relegated to the Championship. Following relegation, Butland criticised the club's transfer policy, branding it "farcical".

Butland remained with Stoke in the Championship in the 2018–19 season. He played 45 times, missing a league match only once, after the birth of his son, and kept 18 clean sheets, the third best in the Championship behind Dean Henderson and Darren Randolph. He was named as player of the season by supporters. Butland began the 2019–20 season in poor form, making several mistakes most notably against Preston North End on 21 August 2019. He was replaced by Adam Federici for the next two league matches, re-taking his place at the start of September. He made another mistake against Nottingham Forest on 27 September 2019 and didn't play again under Nathan Jones. He was reinstated by new manager Michael O'Neill and he worked with a new goalkeeping coach, David Rouse which helped him regain some of his form. The season was suspended in March 2020 due to the COVID-19 pandemic and during the lockdown Butland participated in a campaign making phone calls to vulnerable supporters. The season returned in the summer and Butland sustained a neck injury against Leeds on 9 July, with Adam Davies taking his place for the remainder of the season as Stoke finished in 15th.

=== Crystal Palace ===
Butland signed for Premier League club Crystal Palace on 16 October 2020 on a three-year contract for an undisclosed fee, reported by BBC Sport as £1 million. He kept one clean sheet from 10 league appearances for Crystal Palace, and kept goal for their run to the 2021–22 FA Cup semi-final. He was allowed to join Manchester United on loan for the second half of the 2022–23 season, and would leave Palace when his contract expired.

==== Manchester United (loan) ====
A boyhood Manchester United fan, Butland joined the club on loan on 6 January 2023 for the remainder of the 2022–23 season. He was given the number 31 shirt, recently vacated by fellow goalkeeper Martin Dúbravka. He was on the bench for United 20 times in all competitions, including for the 2023 FA Cup final, but never made a match appearance.

=== Rangers ===
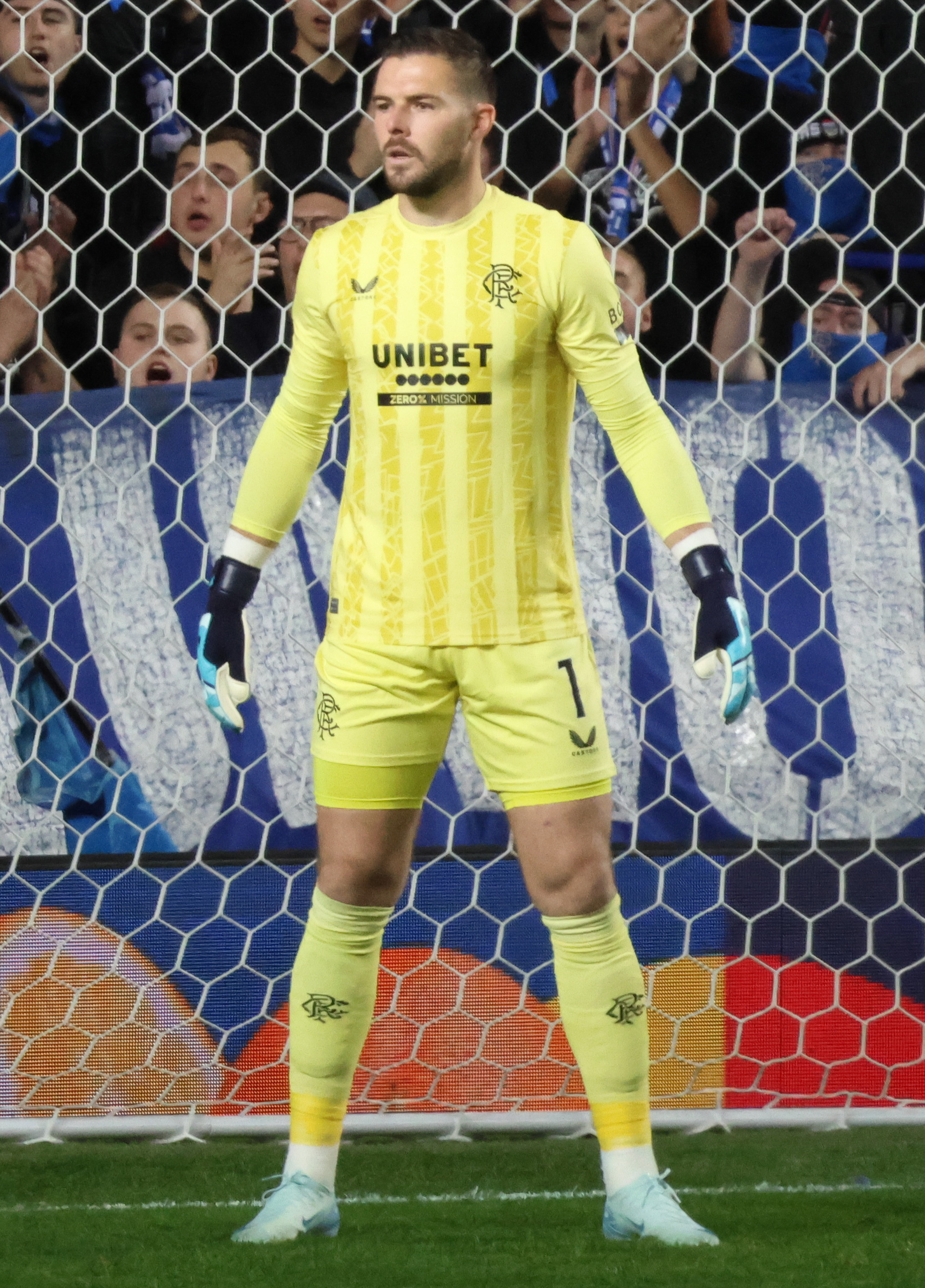
Butland with Rangers in 2024.

On 6 June 2023, Scottish Premiership club Rangers confirmed that Butland had agreed to join them on a four-year deal on 1 July, after the expiry of his contract with Crystal Palace. He made his debut for the club, starting the match, in a 1–0 defeat away to Kilmarnock on 5 August 2023. He recorded his first clean sheet for Rangers during a league match at home to Livingston on 12 August 2023.

=== Hull City ===
On 2 July 2026, Jack Butland signed for Hull City on a two-year contract with an option of a further year.

== International career ==
=== England youth teams ===
Butland made his international debut on 3 October 2008, keeping a clean sheet as the England under-16 team beat their Northern Ireland counterparts 6–0 in a Victory Shield match.

When the whistle went I just couldn't believe it. I was so relieved. We'd just beaten Spain. In a Final. First-ever time European Champions. Unbelievable. An incredible feeling.

— Butland speaking after the UEFA U17 final

He moved up to the under-17s in 2009, and the following year took over as first-choice goalkeeper during the final stages of the European under-17 championships, playing in the final as England defeated Spain under-17s to win the title for the first time. His performances earned him selection as one of two goalkeepers in the 22-man team of the tournament. Butland was part of the under-19 squad that reached the elite qualification round of the 2011 UEFA under-19 championships, but needing to beat Spain under-19s in their last group match, were eliminated at that stage on goal difference after the match ended 1–1.

Included in the squad for the finals of the 2011 FIFA U-20 World Cup, Butland kept clean sheets in all three group matches as England under-20s qualified for the last 16. He conceded only once against the Nigerians in the last 16, but that was enough to defeat an England side that failed to score in any of their four matches.

He made his debut for the England under-21 team on 1 September 2011 in the starting eleven for the 2013 European qualifier against Azerbaijan under-21. Although England won by an apparently comfortable six-goal margin, Butland had to be alert to ensure his clean sheet. He kept his place for the next two qualification matches, wins against Iceland and Norway under-21. With Butland as first-choice goalkeeper for the European finals in Israel, England lost all three of their group matches, against Italy under-21, Norway and Israel, so were eliminated at the first opportunity. He said afterwards that the players were embarrassed at failing to do themselves justice.

=== Great Britain Olympic ===
Butland was named in Stuart Pearce's 18-man Great Britain squad for the 2012 Summer Olympics. He was only included after receiving special dispensation from the FA, who had decided that no players in England's Euro 2012 squad would be eligible for selection. He came on as a half-time substitute in a pre-Games friendly against Brazil on 20 July, and according to the Telegraph, "Only three superb late saves from Jack Butland prevented the scoreline being more emphatic" as Great Britain lost 2–0.

Butland started all of Britain's group matches in the tournament and conceded two goals, one in a 1–1 draw with Senegal and the other in a 3–1 victory over the United Arab Emirates. Against Senegal, he cleared the ball straight to the unmarked Sadio Mané, but redeemed himself by rushing out to distract the attacker, who shot wide. In the third group match, against Uruguay, Butland made two good saves from Luis Suárez to keep a clean sheet as Britain won 1–0 and finished top of their group. An attempted punch of Ji Dong-won's shot went through his hands to give South Korea the lead in the quarter-final. The match ended 1–1, and South Korea won the penalty shootout 5–4.

During the Games, the British Olympic Association was obliged to remind its athletes of the regulations regarding promotion of companies other than Games sponsors, after Butland and others used Twitter to praise headphones given to British competitors as part of an ambush marketing campaign.

=== England senior team ===
Originally named as one of five standby players for England's UEFA Euro 2012 squad, Butland was called into the squad on 25 May after John Ruddy broke a finger in training. He made no appearances, but kept his place when Roy Hodgson named an experimental squad for the first friendly of the 2012–13 season, against Italy in Bern on 15 August. After Joe Hart withdrew from the squad with a back injury, Butland was named in the starting eleven, becoming the youngest ever England international goalkeeper at 19 years 158 days; the previous youngest, Billy Moon, was 64 days older when he first played for England in 1888. Butland conceded once, to a Daniele De Rossi header from a corner, and was replaced at half time by Ruddy. England won the match 2–1.

On 12 October 2015, he was handed his second cap and his first competitive international appearance, away to Lithuania at the end of UEFA Euro 2016 qualifying, with England already assured of their place in the tournament. He kept a clean sheet in the 3–0 win in Vilnius, which meant that England's qualification campaign consisted entirely of victories. During the following match, on 26 March, he suffered a fractured ankle after conceding in a friendly away to Germany, ruling him out of the Euros.

He was named in England's 23-man squad for the 2018 World Cup.

== Personal life ==
In January 2014, Butland had his car, an Audi RS5, stolen from his house in Walsall.

In December 2015, Butland donated £5,000 to the Great Britain women's deaf football team, to go towards funding for their trip to the 2015 Deaf World Cup.

Butland is married to Annabel Peyton; their first child, a son, was born in 2019.

== Career statistics ==
=== Club ===
As of match played 10 May 2026

Appearances and goals by club, season and competition
Club	Season	League			National cup (Note: Includes FA Cup, Scottish Cup)		League cup (Note: Includes Football League/EFL Cup, Scottish League Cup)		Europe		Total	
Club	Season	Division	Apps	Goals	Apps	Goals	Apps	Goals	Apps	Goals	Apps	Goals
Birmingham City	2011–12	Championship	0	0	0	0	—		0	0	0	0
Birmingham City	2012–13	Championship	46	0	0	0	0	0	—		46	0
Birmingham City	Total		46	0	0	0	0	0	0	0	46	0
Cheltenham Town (loan)	2011–12	League Two	24	0	—		—		—		24	0
Stoke City	2013–14	Premier League	3	0	1	0	0	0	—		4	0
Stoke City	2014–15	Premier League	3	0	3	0	2	0	—		8	0
Stoke City	2015–16	Premier League	31	0	0	0	4	0	—		35	0
Stoke City	2016–17	Premier League	5	0	0	0	0	0	—		5	0
Stoke City	2017–18	Premier League	35	0	1	0	0	0	—		36	0
Stoke City	2018–19	Championship	45	0	0	0	0	0	—		45	0
Stoke City	2019–20	Championship	35	0	0	0	1	0	—		36	0
Stoke City	2020–21	Championship	0	0	—		0	0	—		0	0
Stoke City	Total		157	0	5	0	7	0	—		169	0
Barnsley (loan)	2013–14	Championship	13	0	—		—		—		13	0
Leeds United (loan)	2013–14	Championship	16	0	—		—		—		16	0
Derby County (loan)	2014–15	Championship	6	0	—		—		—		6	0
Crystal Palace	2020–21	Premier League	1	0	1	0	—		—		2	0
Crystal Palace	2021–22	Premier League	9	0	5	0	1	0	—		15	0
Crystal Palace	2022–23	Premier League	0	0	—		0	0	—		0	0
Crystal Palace	Total		10	0	6	0	1	0	—		17	0
Manchester United (loan)	2022–23	Premier League	0	0	0	0	0	0	0	0	0	0
Rangers	2023–24	Scottish Premiership	38	0	4	0	4	0	12 (Note: Four appearances in UEFA Champions League, eight appearances in UEFA Europa League)	0	58	0
Rangers	2024–25	Scottish Premiership	28	0	0	0	4	0	12 (Note: Two appearances in UEFA Champions League, ten appearances in UEFA Europa League)	0	44	0
Rangers	2025–26	Scottish Premiership	36	0	1	0	2	0	14 (Note: Six appearances in UEFA Champions League, eight appearances in UEFA Europa League)	0	53	0
Rangers	Total		102	0	5	0	10	0	38	0	155	0
Career total			374	0	16	0	18	0	38	0	446	0

=== International ===
Appearances and goals by national team and year
National team	Year	Apps	Goals
England	2012	1	0
England	2015	2	0
England	2016	1	0
England	2017	2	0
England	2018	3	0
Total		9	0

== Honours ==
Manchester United

- FA Cup runner-up: 2022–23

Rangers

- Scottish League Cup: 2023–24

England U17

- UEFA European Under-17 Championship: 2010

England

- UEFA Nations League third place: 2018–19

Individual

- UEFA European Under-17 Championship Team of the Tournament: 2010
- England U21 Player of the Year: 2015
- Stoke City Player of the Year: 2015–16, 2018–19
- Rangers Supporters' Player of the Year: 2023–24
- Rangers Players' Player of the Year: 2023–24
- PFA Scotland Team of the Year: 2023–24 Premiership
