= Dionatan Teixeira =

Slovak footballer (1992–2017)

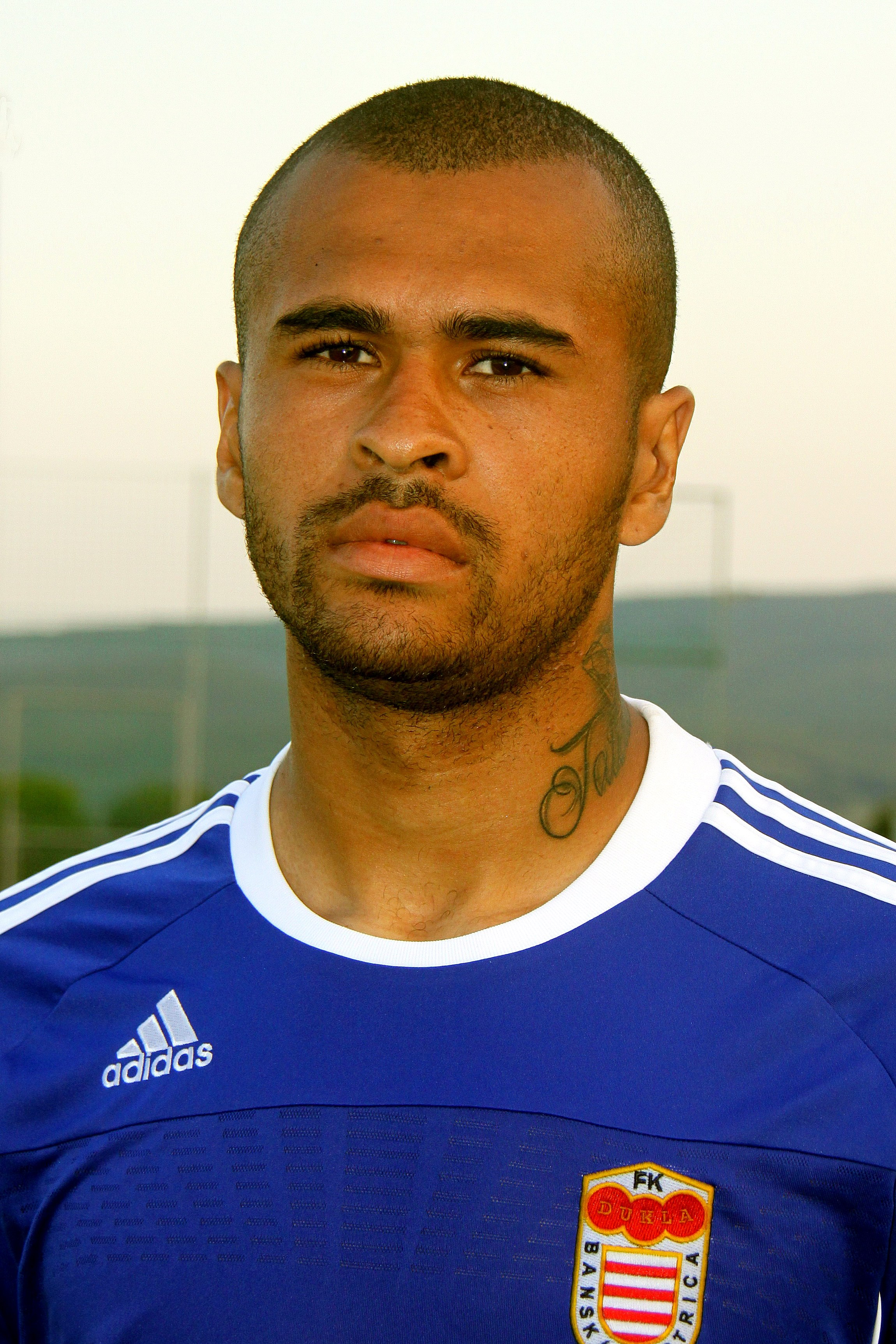
- Teixeira with Dukla Banská Bystrica in 2013

Personal information
- Full name: Dionatan do Nascimento Teixeira
- Date of birth: 24 July 1992
- Place of birth: Londrina, Brazil
- Date of death: 5 November 2017 (aged 25)
- Place of death: Londrina, Brazil
- Height: 1.93 m (6 ft 4 in)
- Position: Centre-back

Youth career
- 2006–2008: Londrina
- 2008–2009: Košice

Senior career*
Years	Team	Apps	(Gls)
2009–2012	Košice	2	(0)
2011–2012	→ Slovan Bratislava (loan)	0	(0)
2012	Baník Ružiná	9	(1)
2013–2014	Dukla Banská Bystrica	35	(3)
2014–2017	Stoke City	2	(0)
2015	→ Fleetwood Town (loan)	8	(0)
2017	Sheriff Tiraspol	10	(0)
Total		66	(4)

International career
2013–2014	Slovakia U21	8	(0)
- * Club domestic league appearances and goals

Dionatan do Nascimento Teixeira (24 July 1992 – 5 November 2017) was a professional footballer who played as a centre-back. Born in Brazil, he represented Slovakia at youth level.

Teixeira began playing football with local side Londrina EC in Brazil before he was given the opportunity to play in Europe with Slovak side MFK Košice in 2008. He played in the youth teams at Košice and went on trials with a number of clubs in England. A failure to gain a work permit ended any chances of him joining an English club, and after playing on loan for Slovan Bratislava in 2011–12 he was released by Košice.

After briefly playing amateur football he moved on to Baník Ružiná and then to Slovak Super Liga side Dukla Banská Bystrica. In 2013 Teixeira was granted Slovak citizenship and after impressing Stoke City whilst on trial he joined them on a three-year contract in June 2014. However, he failed to make any impact at Stoke and left in January 2017 and later joined Moldovan side Sheriff Tiraspol.

== Career ==
=== Early career ===
Teixeira began his career with local team Londrina EC in his native Brazil. At the age of 16 he decided to move into European football and earned a youth contract with Slovak side MFK Košice. In 2009, Teixeria went on trial with a number of English teams including Middlesbrough, Blackburn Rovers, Newcastle United and Manchester City.

He returned to Košice in April 2009 and made his first team debut on 18 April 2009 against MFK Dubnica. After a lack of opportunity at Košice he went on loan to Slovan Bratislava for the 2011–12 season but spent his time in Bratislava playing in the B team. He left Košice in the summer of 2012 and after spending time playing for local amateur side Slovan Čeľadice he joined 2. Liga side Baník Ružiná. In March 2013 he joined Slovak Super Liga side Dukla Banská Bystrica.

In January 2014, Teixeira had a trial at Reading and at Stoke City in March 2014.

=== Stoke City ===
On 11 June 2014, he signed a three-year contract with Stoke City, with Chief Executive Tony Scholes saying — "We have been following Dionatan's progress for some time and we're delighted to have secured his services because there's no doubt he's a talented player with a great deal of potential." Stoke manager Mark Hughes stated that whilst on trial Teixeira reminded him of Ryan Nelsen who played for Hughes at Blackburn Rovers. —"Dionatan came in on trial and I've done that before with the likes of Chris Samba and Ryan Nelsen, who we had the opportunity to bring in at Blackburn. When you can look at players close up you get a better impression of what their capabilities are. We did it with Dionatan and he looked really good".

Teixeira's start to his Stoke City career was hampered after he broke his foot in training which ruled him out for most of the 2014–15 season. He made his Premier League debut for Stoke on 21 February 2015, coming on as a substitute in a 2–1 victory against Aston Villa.

On 3 October 2015, he joined League One side Fleetwood Town on loan. He spent three months with the club making ten appearances before returning to Stoke. Teixeira again featured just once as a substitute for Stoke in 2015–16, away at Bournemouth in February 2016. In May 2016 he had a trial at MLS side Orlando City.

Teixeira's contract with Stoke was terminated in January 2017 after making just two appearances as substitute.

=== Sheriff Tiraspol ===
On 17 February 2017, Teixeira signed for Moldovan club Sheriff Tiraspol.

== Death ==
On 5 November 2017, Teixeira suffered a fatal heart attack in Londrina, Brazil.

== International career ==
Teixeira gained a Slovak passport in August 2013. After that he was a regular member of the Slovak U21 team.

== Personal life ==
His younger brother Marcão also became a professional footballer.

== Career statistics ==
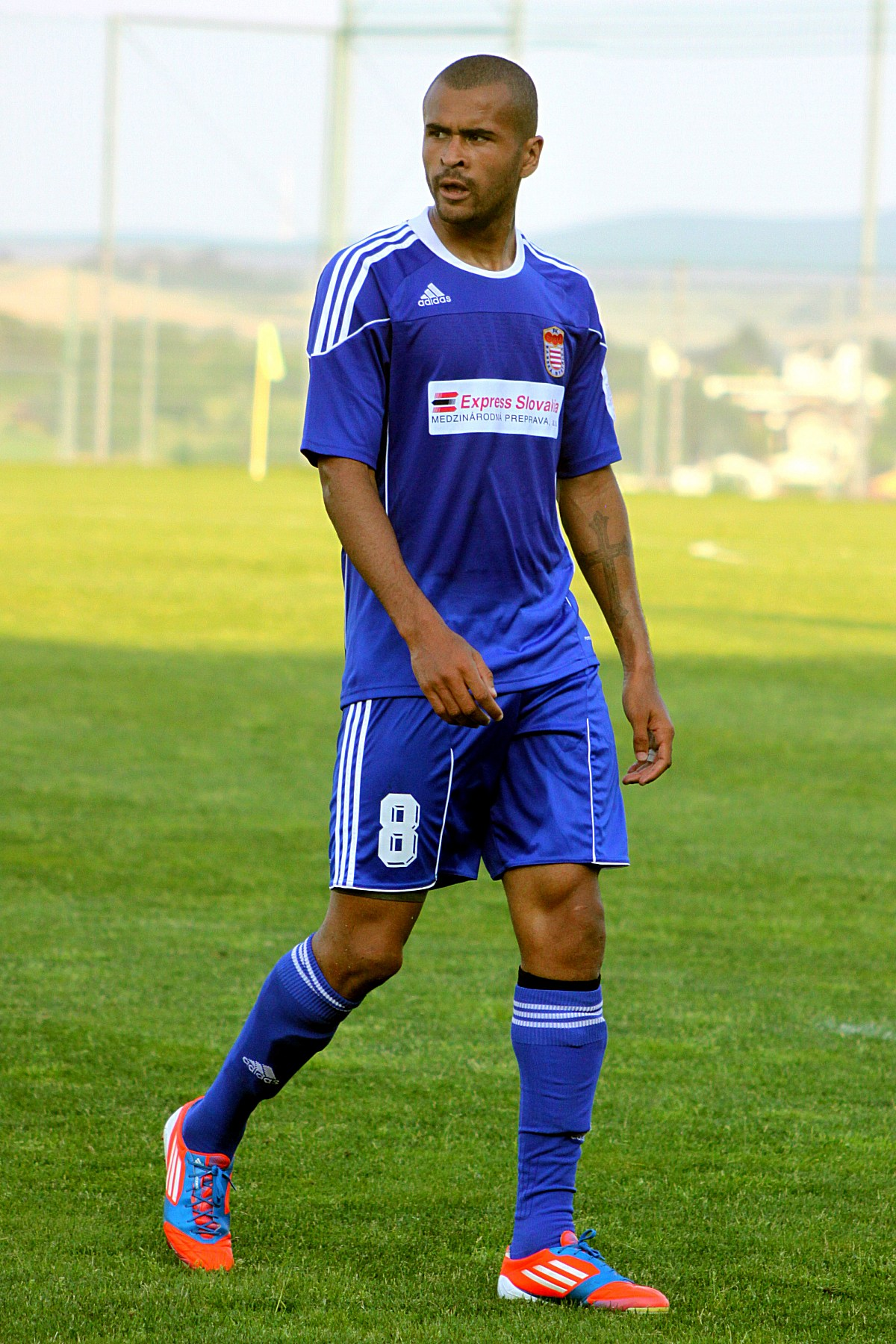
Teixeira playing for Dukla Banská Bystrica in 2013

Club	Season	League			Cup		League Cup		Other		Total	
Club	Season	Division	Apps	Goals	Apps	Goals	Apps	Goals	Apps	Goals	Apps	Goals
MFK Košice	2009–10	Slovak Super Liga	2	0	0	0	—		—		2	0
MFK Košice	2010–11	Slovak Super Liga	0	0	0	0	—		—		0	0
MFK Košice	2011–12	Slovak Super Liga	0	0	0	0	—		—		0	0
Baník Ružiná	2012–13	Slovak 2. Liga	9	1	0	0	—		—		9	1
Dukla Banská Bystrica	2012–13	Slovak Super Liga	13	0	0	0	—		—		13	0
Dukla Banská Bystrica	2013–14	Slovak Super Liga	22	3	0	0	—		—		22	3
Stoke City	2014–15	Premier League	1	0	0	0	0	0	—		1	0
Stoke City	2015–16	Premier League	1	0	0	0	0	0	—		1	0
Fleetwood Town (loan)	2015–16	League One	8	0	0	0	0	0	2	0	10	0
Sheriff Tiraspol	2016–17	Moldovan National Division	10	0	2	0	—		0	0	12	0
Career total			66	4	2	0	0	0	2	0	70	4
