= Ollie Shenton =

English footballer

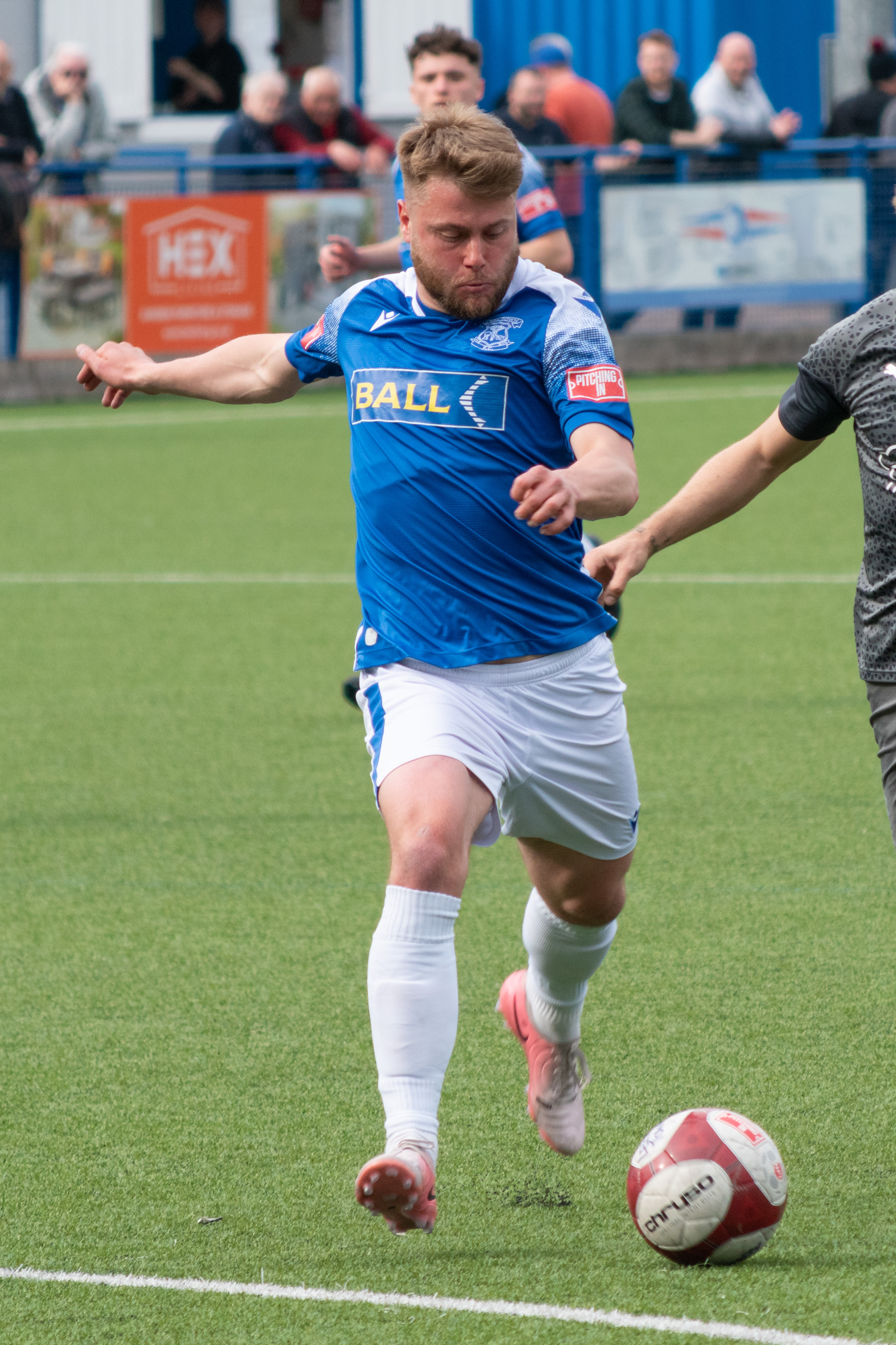
- Shenton playing for Leek Town in 2025

Personal information
- Full name: Oliver Gregory Shenton
- Date of birth: 6 November 1997 (age 29)
- Place of birth: Blythe Bridge, Stoke-on-Trent, England
- Height: 1.75 m (5 ft 9 in)
- Position: Midfielder

Team information
- Current team: Leek Town

Youth career
- 2004–2014: Stoke City

Senior career*
Years	Team	Apps	(Gls)
2014–2020	Stoke City	1	(0)
2017	→ Wrexham (loan)	17	(1)
2019–2020	→ Kidderminster Harriers (loan)	21	(3)
2020–2024	Chorley	104	(14)
2024	→ Warrington Rylands (loan)	4	(1)
2024–2026	Leek Town	79	(7)
- * Club domestic league appearances and goals as of 13:11, 2 April 2024 (UTC)

Oliver Gregory Shenton (born 6 November 1997) is an English footballer who plays as a midfielder.

== Career ==
=== Stoke City ===
Shenton was born in Blythe Bridge and joined the Stoke City Academy in 2004. At 15 Shenton began playing regularly with the under-18s side and he signed a long-term contract with the club in September 2013. In April 2014 he won the Generation Adidas Cup with Stoke City U17s. He signed on scholarship forms in July 2014. In 2014–15 pre-season Shenton began training with the first-team and played 30 minutes in a 0–0 draw with Burton Albion. He began the 2014–15 season playing with the under-21s and scored on his debut in a 1–1 draw with Aston Villa.

He made his professional debut on 27 August 2014, coming on as an 81st-minute substitute for Peter Odemwingie in a 3–0 win over Portsmouth in the Football League Cup second round. After making his senior debut Shenton earned praise from assistant manager Mark Bowen for his performance. On 25 November 2014 Shenton signed a professional contract with Stoke. Shenton made his Premier League debut on 11 February 2015, coming on as an added-time substitute for Steven Nzonzi in a 4–1 home defeat against Manchester City. The match came two days after the funeral of his mother; following the game Shenton swapped shirts with Frank Lampard. Shenton signed a new four-and-a-half-year contract in January 2016 keeping him contracted at Stoke until the summer of 2020.

On 20 January 2017 Shenton joined Wrexham on loan for the remainder of the 2016–17 season. Shenton played 17 times for the Dragons, scoring once against Braintree Town on 4 March 2017.

On 30 August 2019, Shenton joined Kidderminster Harriers on a six-month loan. This was extended for the remainder of the 2019–20 season. Shenton scored three goals in 24 matches for Kidderminster until the season was ended early on 22 April 2020 due to the COVID-19 pandemic in England.

=== Chorley ===
Shenton joined Chorley in June 2020.

In March 2024, Shenton joined Northern Premier League Premier Division club Warrington Rylands on loan until the end of the season.

== Personal life ==
Shenton attended Blythe Bridge High School and grew up supporting Stoke City. His mother, Mandy, died of cancer in January 2015.

== Career statistics ==
As of 22 February 2020

Club	Season	League			FA Cup		League Cup		Other		Total	
Club	Season	Division	Apps	Goals	Apps	Goals	Apps	Goals	Apps	Goals	Apps	Goals
Stoke City	2014–15	Premier League	1	0	0	0	1	0	—		2	0
Stoke City	2015–16	Premier League	0	0	0	0	0	0	—		0	0
Stoke City	2016–17	Premier League	0	0	0	0	0	0	—		0	0
Stoke City	2017–18	Premier League	0	0	0	0	0	0	—		0	0
Stoke City	2018–19	EFL Championship	0	0	0	0	0	0	—		0	0
Stoke City	2019–20	EFL Championship	0	0	0	0	0	0	—		0	0
Stoke City	Total		1	0	0	0	1	0	—		2	0
Stoke City U23	2016–17	—	—		—		—		2 (Note: Appearances in EFL Trophy)	0	2	0
Stoke City U23	2017–18	—	—		—		—		3	0	3	0
Stoke City U23	2018–19	—	—		—		—		4	1	4	1
Stoke City U23	Total		—		—		—		9	1	9	1
Wrexham (loan)	2016–17	National League	17	1	0	0	0	0	—		17	1
Kidderminster Harriers (loan)	2019–20	National League North	21	3	2	0	0	0	1	0	24	3
Career total			39	4	2	0	1	0	10	1	52	5
