= 2014–15 Stoke City F.C. season =

Stoke City
2014–15 season
- Chairman: Peter Coates
- Manager: Mark Hughes
- Stadium: Britannia Stadium
- Premier League: 9th (54 points)
- FA Cup: Fifth Round
- League Cup: Fourth Round
- Top goalscorer: League: Mame Biram Diouf (11); All: Mame Biram Diouf (12)
- Highest home attendance: 27,602 v Liverpool (24 May 2015)
- Lowest home attendance: 26,332 v Newcastle United (29 September 2014)
- Average home league attendance: 27,081
Home colours	Away colours

The 2014–15 season is Stoke City's seventh season in the Premier League and the 59th in the top tier of English football.

In preparation for the 2014–15 season Mark Hughes signed Phil Bardsley, Mame Biram Diouf, Bojan Krkić, Steve Sidwell, Dionatan Teixeira whilst Victor Moses and Oussama Assaidi joined on season-long loans. Departing the Britannia Stadium were Matthew Etherington, Cameron Jerome, Michael Kightly and Ryan Shotton. Stoke had a mixed start to the season as they lost 1–0 at home to Aston Villa, drew 1–1 with Hull City and then beat the reigning league champions Manchester City 1–0. This set the tone for an inconsistent Autumn as Stoke managed just three wins in September, October and November and lost at home to newly promoted sides Burnley and Leicester City.

Results improved in December as the Potters beat Arsenal 3–2, Everton and West Bromwich Albion both 1–0. Stoke suffered a number of injuries in January most notably to Bojan but the side were still able to secure victories against Leicester City and Queens Park Rangers. Stoke's only arrival in the January transfer window was German centre-back Philipp Wollscheid on loan from Bayer Leverkusen. After drawing 1–1 at Newcastle United, Stoke suffered back-to-back 4–1 defeats to Manchester City and then in the FA Cup to Blackburn Rovers. Stoke recovered well from this set-back winning their next three matches against Aston Villa, Hull City and Everton. This was the followed by three defeats against West Brom, Crystal Palace and Chelsea. Stoke ended the season strongly with victories over Southampton (2–1), Tottenham Hotspur (3–0) and Liverpool (6–1) ensuring a second consecutive 9th-place finish.

== Pre-season ==
In March 2014 Stoke announced that from the 2014–15 season their kit will be supplied by American sportswear manufacturer Warrior Sports. In May 2014 long serving winger Matthew Etherington was released from the club following the end of his contract as well as under-21 players, Lucas Dawson, Kevin Gomez-Nieto, Ben Heneghan, Jordan Keane, Jordan Richardson and Karim Rossi. On 22 May 2014 Sunderland full-back Phil Bardsley agreed to join Stoke on a three-year contract. Fulham midfielder Steve Sidwell joined Stoke on a free transfer on 9 June 2014 on a two-year deal having previously worked under Mark Hughes. On 11 June 2014 Stoke made two signings, Senegalese striker Mame Biram Diouf arrived on a free transfer from Hannover 96 whilst 21-year-old Slovak defender Dionatan Teixeira joined from Dukla Banská Bystrica for an undisclosed fee. Stoke returned to training on 9 July where they went to nearby St George's Park for fitness tests. On 18 July 2014 the squad flew out to Germany for a pre-season training camp and friendlies against Borussia Mönchengladbach, TSV 1860 München and Schalke 04.

Stoke's first match of pre-season was against Borussia Mönchengladbach in Rottach-Egern. Heavy rain delayed kick-off by 20 minutes as manager Mark Hughes decided to give all of his players 45 minutes. In an eventful first half new signing Mame Biram Diouf almost saw his early shot parried by Christofer Heimeroth into the path of Andy Wilkinson but Heimeroth denied Wilkinson what would have been a rare goal with a fine save. Just after half time a loose pass by Charlie Adam was picked up by Thorgan Hazard who slid the ball past Thomas Sørensen. Stoke earned a 1–1 draw after Jonathan Walters battled his way through the Borussia defence and set-up Peter Crouch for a simple tap-in. On 22 July 2014 Stoke completed the signing of Barcelona forward Bojan Krkić for an undisclosed fee. Stoke's second pre-season encounter was a 2–0 defeat against TSV 1860 München with goals from Daniel Adlung and Bobby Wood. Stoke's final game of their training camp was against Schalke 04 in Kufstein just over the border in Austria. In an even first half Marko Arnautović had a penalty well saved by Ralf Fährmann. Bojan scored his first Stoke goal just after half time after being put through one on one by Stephen Ireland. However, Schalke responded quickly with a header from Joël Matip. Dionatan Teixeira then had a goal disallowed for offside before a late strike from Tranquillo Barnetta earned Schalke the win.

Upon their return to England Hughes split his squad for games against Burton Albion and Blackburn Rovers. Both matches were drawn firstly 0–0 with Burton and 1–1 with Blackburn with Bojan scoring his second pre-season goal. On 6 August 2014 Stoke played their only home friendly of pre-season against Spanish outfit Real Betis. A period of good one-touch build up play led to Phil Bardsley crossing across the face of goal for Erik Pieters to tap in. Stoke made it 2–0 after Bojan won the ball on the half way line and ran through and fired past Antonio Adán for his third pre-season goal and earned Stoke their first win. Stoke's final match of pre-season was back in Germany where they played out a 1–1 draw with SC Freiburg at the Dreisamstadion. Mame Biram Diouf scored his first goal for Stoke cancelling out an early goal from Pavel Krmaš.

Match	Date	Opponent	Venue	Result	Attendance	Scorers	Report
1	20 July 2014	Borussia Mönchengladbach	A	1–1	1,200	Crouch 65'	Report
2	26 July 2014	TSV 1860 München	A	0–2	1,000		Report
3	29 July 2014	Schalke 04	A	1–2	2,000	Bojan 55'	Report
4	2 August 2014	Burton Albion	A	0–0	1,836		Report
5	3 August 2014	Blackburn Rovers	A	1–1	4,351	Bojan 68'	Report
6	6 August 2014	Real Betis	H	2–0	10,211	Pieters 30', Bojan 43'	Report
7	9 August 2014	SC Freiburg	A	1–1	13,700	Diouf 39'	Report

== Premier League ==
=== August ===
For the first match of the 2014–15 season Stoke faced Midlands rivals Aston Villa at the Britannia Stadium. Manager Mark Hughes gave debuts to new arrivals Phil Bardsley, Mame Biram Diouf and Bojan Krkić. Stoke made a decent start as they enjoyed a lot of possession in the Villa half without troubling Brad Guzan. Stoke almost fell behind after a mix-up between Asmir Begović and Marc Wilson allowed Kieran Richardson to cross to Gabriel Agbonlahor, but despite an open goal he failed to hit the target. Villa took the lead just after half-time with a powerful shot from Andreas Weimann. Stoke rarely looked like getting back into the game thereafter and Villa were able to see the game out. Before the match Stoke announced the signing of Victor Moses on a season-long loan from Chelsea.

Stoke's first away match of the season saw them travel to the KC Stadium to take on Hull City. Stoke were handed an early boost as Tigers defender James Chester was sent-off for a professional foul on Glenn Whelan. Despite their one-man advantage Stoke struggled to create goalscoring opportunities and just before half-time Hull took the lead when Tom Huddlestone's shot was only parried by Begović into the path of Nikica Jelavić. Stoke managed to salvage a point after Ryan Shawcross bundled the ball just over the line in the 83rd minute. It was frustrating match for Stoke as despite having 19 shots on goal only 3 were on target.

On 30 August 2014 Stoke faced the current champions Manchester City at the City of Manchester Stadium. After a goalless first half Stoke took a shock lead on 58 minutes after a Man City corner was headed out to Mame Biram Diouf just outside his own penalty area, Diouf sprinted 70 yards down the pitch and scored past Joe Hart. Stoke were defensively resolute and were able to hold out for a 1–0 victory. After the match Asmir Begovic stated that it was Stoke's best win in the Premier League. There was some bad news for Stoke however as Peter Odemwingie sustained a knee injury which required surgery.

=== September ===
On transfer deadline day Stoke brought back winger Oussama Assaidi on another season-long loan from Liverpool. After the international break Stoke came up against newly promoted Leicester City at the Britannia Stadium on 13 September. It was another frustrating afternoon for the Potters as they had 27 shots on goal with only 6 on target and Leicester took full advantage of Stoke's wastefulness scoring the only goal of the game through Leonardo Ulloa.

Stoke then faced another newly promoted side, Queens Park Rangers away at Loftus Road. Stoke took the lead through Diouf after good wing play from Victor Moses. QPR levelled through Steven Caulker before Peter Crouch scored his first goal of the season against his former club. Stoke were denied a victory as Niko Kranjčar curled in a late free-kick and the match ended in a 2–2 draw.

On 29 September Stoke took on Alan Pardew's Newcastle United at the Britannia Stadium. Both sides went into the match under pressure with Stoke losing both of their home games whilst Newcastle had failed to record a victory. Stoke took an early lead as Peter Crouch headed in a cross from Victor Moses. Newcastle struggled to get back into the game and Arnautovic could have extended Stoke's advantage but his shot hit the post. Newcastle did have a chance to claim a point but Jack Colback could only hit the crossbar from four yards out.

=== October ===
After beating Sunderland at the Stadium of Light in the League Cup in September, Stoke were looking to make it a quick fire double. However Sunderland scored early through Connor Wickham, Charlie Adam levelled on 15 minutes before two goals from Steven Fletcher earned Sunderland a 3–1 victory. It was a poor performance from Stoke and Mark Hughes admitted that his side deserved to lose.

Following the international break Stoke took on Swansea City on 19 October. After an uneventful start the game turned as referee Michael Oliver awarded both sides controversial penalties. Firstly Ryan Shawcross was penalised for holding Wilfried Bony and then Victor Moses was brought down by Àngel Rangel. Both managers were unhappy with the decisions with Hughes stating that he feels Shawcross is being singled-out whilst Garry Monk claimed that Moses dived. Stoke were able to earn a 2–1 victory after Jonathan Walters headed past Łukasz Fabiański.

Stoke ended October with back to back League and Cup matches against an in-form Southampton side who went into the matches having previously beaten Sunderland 8–0. The Saints had the better chances and scored the only goal of the game through Sadio Mané.

=== November ===
After Stoke were knocked out of the League Cup by Southampton they played against West Ham United. Stoke created numerous chances and goals from Victor Moses and Mame Diouf seemed to have given Stoke the victory. But the Hammers mounted a late comeback with goals from Enner Valencia and Stewart Downing which left Stoke having to settle for a 2–2 draw.

On 9 November Stoke made the trip to the capital to take on Tottenham Hotspur at White Hart Lane. Stoke took an early lead through a low shot from Bojan Krkić. Stoke added a second goal after Walters scored from close range following a square ball from Diouf. Spurs pulled one back late on through a Nacer Chadli volley but soon after Tottenham defender Kyle Naughton was sent-off for a professional foul on Moses and Stoke were able to see out a 2–1 victory.

Despite defeating Tottenham, Stoke's inconsistency remained as they fell to a home defeat against newly promoted Burnley. The Potters made a woeful start to the match and conceded two goals in the opening 15 minutes, Danny Ings scoring both Burnley goals. Stoke pulled one back via Jon Walters but a wasteful second half display saw them suffer a third home defeat of the campaign.

Stoke's preparation for the final match of November against Liverpool was disrupted by a sickness bug at the club's training ground. The match itself was a largely uneventful affair which was won 1–0 by Liverpool, Glen Johnson scoring in the 85th minute.

=== December ===
Stoke suffered a third straight league defeat on 2 December losing 2–1 at Manchester United. Marouane Fellaini headed Man United in front which was cancelled out by Steven Nzonzi just before half time. A free-kick from Juan Mata put the home side back in front and Stoke were denied a point after Diouf's shot was blocked on the line by Ashley Young late in the match.

Stoke then took on Arsenal in what was an eventful 90 minutes of football. The Potters made a perfect start as straight from kick-off the ball was played down the wing to Nzonzi who crossed in for Peter Crouch to tap the ball past Emiliano Martínez. Arsenal had the chance to pull level after Héctor Bellerín's cross found an unmarked Olivier Giroud but he could only guide his header off target. Stoke added a second after Bojan turned in a cross from Walters before Walters himself scored to make it 3–0 at half time. Stoke thought they had made it 4–0 after Bojan had fired past Martínez but after a short delay the officials disallowed it for Diouf being in offside position and therefore interfering with play. Arsenal took advantage of the confusion with goals from Santi Cazorla and Aaron Ramsey but their hopes of completing a comeback were ended when Calum Chambers was sent-off for a second bookable offence and Stoke saw out a 3–2 victory.

The next match away at Crystal Palace saw both teams make a bright start as Palace scored in the eleventh minute via a looping header from James McArthur. Just 92 seconds later Crouch scored from close range after a shot from Walters deflected into his path. However the remainder of the match saw both teams cancel each other out as the match ended in an drab 1–1 draw.

Stoke began the festive period with a home match against league leaders Chelsea on 22 December. Stoke made a terrible start as John Terry headed in a Cesc Fàbregas corner after only two minutes. Stoke struggled to cause Chelsea too much problems and they sealed the win through Fàbregas late in the second half.

On Boxing Day Stoke made the journey to Goodison Park to face Everton. The first half was a disrupted by a number of lengthy injury delays before the key moment in the match. Everton full-back Leighton Baines burst through on goal only for Jonathan Walters to pull him back, however Lee Mason gave Walters a yellow card. From the resulting free-kick Everton lost possession and Stoke counter-attacked through Bojan who was fouled by James McCarthy in the penalty area, Bojan then converted the spot-kick. Stoke were able to produce a strong defensive performance in the second half and were able to hold on for a 1–0 victory.

Stoke ended a successful 2014 with a home match against Midlands rivals West Bromwich Albion at the Britannia. After a goalless first half a well worked moved ended with Diouf firing past Ben Foster. The Baggies should have equalized following a goalmouth scramble but Gareth McAuley could only hit the post from close range. Stoke secured back to back victories for the first time in the 2014–15 season after Arnautovic's shot deflected in off Diouf. After the match West Brom sacked manager Alan Irvine and replaced him with former Stoke manager Tony Pulis.

=== January ===
The first match of 2015 came against Manchester United at the Britannia Stadium. Stoke made a perfect start to the match as Ryan Shawcross scored past his former club after just two minutes. Stoke should have added a second after Diouf outmuscled Jonny Evans to go clean through on goal but he fired the shot over the bar, shortly after Man United leveled through Radamel Falcao. In the second half Stoke had a penalty appeal turned down by referee Michael Oliver for a handball by Chris Smalling and then a header by Crouch hit the post as the match ended 1–1.

On 7 January 2015 Stoke made their first signing of the January transfer with the loan arrival of German defender Philipp Wollscheid on loan from Bayer Leverkusen. He made his debut in the next league match away at Arsenal, however Stoke went on to produce a poor performance. Goals from Laurent Koscielny and a brace from Alexis Sánchez earned the home side the three points.

Stoke recovered well the following week away at Midlands rivals Leicester City where they produced a commanding performance in a 1–0 victory. Stoke were dealt a blow before kick-off after Ryan Shawcross failed a fitness test meaning that Glenn Whelan took over as captain. After a goalless first half, Bojan fired a low shot past Ben Hamer after 63 minutes which was enough to earn the Potters their fourth away win of the season and their first at the King Power Stadium.

Stoke suffered a major blow before their match against Queens Park Rangers with the news that Bojan will miss the rest of the season with a knee injury. Stephen Ireland took the role vacated by Bojan and he set-up Walters for the opening goal after 21 minutes. Walters added a second goal before Niko Kranjčar pulled one back for QPR just before half-time. Rangers tried in vain for force an equalizer in the second half with a Joey Barton free-kick which hit the crossbar the closest they came. Walters completed his hat-trick in stoppage time, becoming the first Stoke player to score a Premier League hat-trick. On the final day of the January transfer window Mark Hughes allowed Robert Huth to join Leicester City on loan for the remainder of the 2014–15 season.

=== February ===
Stoke's next match was against John Carver's Newcastle United at St James' Park. After a fairly uneventful encounter the match came to life in the final 20 minutes after Newcastle midfielder Jack Colback avoided being sent-off for a foul on Victor Moses. Colback then scored with a low shot past Begovic on 74 minutes. Ireland had a goal ruled out for offside whilst Yoan Gouffran and Ayoze Pérez were guilt of poor finishing for the home side. Stoke were able to claim a point as Crouch headed in a Geoff Cameron cross in the final moments of the match.

On 11 February champions Manchester City, claimed their first Premier League win at the Britannia Stadium in emphatic fashion. It was an even first half where a Crouch header cancelled out Sergio Agüero's opening goal. However Man City scored three times without reply in the second half with goals from Agüero, James Milner and Samir Nasri. With the match over as a contest Hughes was able to bring on Ollie Shenton for his league debut.

After the embarrassing FA Cup defeat to Blackburn Rovers, Stoke took on Aston Villa at Villa Park. Villa had new manager Tim Sherwood in charge for the first time following the sacking of Paul Lambert. Scott Sinclair headed Villa in front after 20 minutes before a header from Diouf made it 1–1 just before half time. With the match seemingly headed for a draw, a mistake from Villa captain Ron Vlaar let Victor Moses through on goal, Vlaar then mistimed a sliding tackle and conceded a 90th-minute penalty. Vlaar was then sent-off by referee Roger East and Moses scored the penalty to earn Stoke a 2–1 victory.

Stoke ended the month of February with a scrappy 1–0 win over Hull City. Peter Crouch scored the only goal of the game after 71 minutes just moments after coming on as a substitute. Stephen Ireland suffered a deep cut on his calf which required 15 stitches following a challenge by Hull City defender Maynor Figueroa.

=== March ===
Stoke then made it three wins in a row with a 2–0 victory over Roberto Martínez's Everton. Goals from Moses and Diouf sealed the victory which moved Stoke onto 42 points and into 8th position.

Stoke then came up against former manager Tony Pulis now in charge at West Bromwich Albion. It was a drab 90 minutes of football with a header from Brown Ideye proving to be the only goal of the contest.

Crystal Palace then inflicted a fourth home defeat of the campaign upon Stoke on 21 March. Diouf scored early on after a Charlie Adam free-kick deflected into his path before the game turned in the last five minutes of the first half. Referee Andre Marriner adjudged that Begovic had fouled Yannick Bolasie in the penalty area which Glenn Murray converted. Slack defending then let in Wilfried Zaha just to give Palace a 2–1 half time lead. Stoke tried in vain to find an equaliser with Palace 'keeper Julián Speroni in fine form.

=== April ===
Stoke began April with a trip to league leaders Chelsea on 4 April. The home side made a commanding start and after a period of sustained pressure they were awarded a penalty after Phillip Wollschied miss-timed a challenge on Cesc Fàbregas. Eden Hazard sent Begović the wrong way from the spot. Stoke equalised just before half time in spectacular fashion as Charlie Adam beat Chelsea 'keeper Thibaut Courtois from his own half. Chelsea manager José Mourinho brought on his top goalscorer Diego Costa at half-time but went off injured 10 minutes later. The Blues went back in front after a mistake from Begovic, which allowed Hazard to square the ball for Loïc Rémy for a simple tap-in. Nzonzi hit the post for Stoke as they fell to a 2–1 defeat.

Stoke went into their next match against West Ham United looking end a run of three defeats. However they made a poor start to the match as Aaron Cresswell curled in a free-kick after seven minutes. Stoke dominated the remainder of the match from then on but were left frustrated in the search of an equaliser. Marko Arnautović twice had a goal ruled out of offside whilst a header from Diouf hit the post. Stoke and were not to be denied a point though as Arnautović finally scored a legitimate goal in the 95th minute.

Ronald Koeman's Southampton were next at the Britannia on 18 April. The Saints went into the match still looking to earn a place in Europe following a successful campaign, and they took the lead when Morgan Schneiderlin tapped in from close range after Stoke had failed to deal with a corner. Stoke should have equalised just before half-time but Nzonzi miscued from just yards out. He helped Stoke level straight after half time as his over hit cross hit the crossbar and Diouf was quickest to react. Stoke managed to beat Southampton for the first time in the Premier League after Charlie Adam scored the winning goal in the 84th minute.

For the visit of relegation threatened Sunderland there was a minute's silence for the 30th anniversary of the Bradford City stadium fire. Stoke made an awful start to the match as Sunderland took the lead inside the first minute through Connor Wickham after Begovic failed to hold on to a low cross. Stoke dominated from the restart and Adam fired Stoke level after 27 minutes. A jittery Stoke defense provided Sunderland with their best chances of taking three points but they were unable to capitalise and the match ended 1–1. Peter Odemwingie made his come back from injury playing for the first time since August.

=== May ===
Stoke traveled to South Wales on 2 May to play against Swansea City at the Liberty Stadium where Jack Butland was give his first start of the season. Stoke produced a poor performance and lost the match 2–0 with goals from Jefferson Montero and Ki Sung-yueng. Marc Wilson became the first Stoke player to be sent-off in the Premier League this season after picking up two yellow cards.

The Potters faced Tottenham Hotspur the following week at the Britannia Stadium. Stoke made a strong start and scored through a header from Adam after 21 minutes via a defensive mistake from Jan Vertonghen. City doubled their lead after another Spurs defensive mishap, a cross-field ball by Adam ended up with Hugo Lloris and Eric Dier getting in each other's way and Nzonzi was able to fire the ball into an empty net. It got worse for Tottenham as Vlad Chiricheș was sent-off of two bookable offences and Diouf scored late on to seal a 3–0 victory and move stoke on to 50 points. It was also the first time Stoke had completed the double over Tottenham Hotspur. The Premier League dubious goals panel later ruled Diouf's goal as a Jan Vertonghen own goal.

Stoke beat last season's record points tally in the Premier League in a penultimate match of the season against already relegated Burnley at Turf Moor. Both sides cancelled each other out in an uneventful 0–0 draw.

The final match of the 2014–15 season was against Liverpool at the Britannia Stadium who had former England captain Steven Gerrard playing his final match for the club. Diouf opened the scoring in the 22nd minute after Adam's shot was parried into his path by Simon Mignolet. Diouf scored again soon after with a powerful shot from the edge of the area. Walters made it 3–0 on the half hour mark after being gifted a chance by Emre Can. Adam scored against his former club with a low shot before Nzonzi curled in a shot from 25-yards to earn Stoke a 5–0 lead at half-time. Liverpool fans had something to celebrate after Gerrard scored a consolation but Crouch scored the final goal of the match to make the score 6–1. It was Stoke's biggest top-flight win since the 1966–67 season.

=== Results ===
Match	Date	Opponent	Venue	Result	Attendance	Scorers	Report
1	16 August 2014	Aston Villa	H	0–1	27,478		Report
2	24 August 2014	Hull City	A	1–1	24,348	Shawcross 83'	Report
3	30 August 2014	Manchester City	A	1–0	45,622	Diouf 58'	Report
4	13 September 2014	Leicester City	H	0–1	27,500		Report
5	20 September 2014	Queens Park Rangers	A	2–2	16,163	Diouf 11', Crouch 51'	Report
6	29 September 2014	Newcastle United	H	1–0	26,332	Crouch 15'	Report
7	4 October 2014	Sunderland	A	1–3	42,713	Adam 15'	Report
8	19 October 2014	Swansea City	H	2–1	27,017	Adam 43' (pen), Walters 76'	Report
9	25 October 2014	Southampton	A	0–1	30,017		Report
10	1 November 2014	West Ham United	H	2–2	27,174	Moses 33', Diouf 56'	Report
11	9 November 2014	Tottenham Hotspur	A	2–1	35,966	Bojan 6', Walters 33'	Report
12	22 November 2014	Burnley	H	1–2	27,018	Walters 32'	Report
13	29 November 2014	Liverpool	A	0–1	44,735		Report
14	2 December 2014	Manchester United	A	1–2	75,388	Nzonzi 39'	Report
15	6 December 2014	Arsenal	H	3–2	27,367	Crouch 1', Bojan 35', Walters 45'	Report
16	13 December 2014	Crystal Palace	A	1–1	23,038	Crouch 13'	Report
17	22 December 2014	Chelsea	H	0–2	27,550		Report
18	26 December 2014	Everton	A	1–0	39,166	Bojan 38' (pen)	Report
19	28 December 2014	West Bromwich Albion	H	2–0	27,070	Diouf (2) 51', 66'	Report
20	1 January 2015	Manchester United	H	1–1	27,203	Shawcross 2'	Report
21	11 January 2015	Arsenal	A	0–3	59,956		Report
22	17 January 2015	Leicester City	A	1–0	31,722	Bojan 63'	Report
23	31 January 2015	Queens Park Rangers	H	3–1	27,512	Walters (3) 21', 34', 90+2'	Report
24	8 February 2015	Newcastle United	A	1–1	47,763	Crouch 90'	Report
25	11 February 2015	Manchester City	H	1–4	27,011	Crouch 38'	Report
26	21 February 2015	Aston Villa	A	2–1	31,880	Diouf 45', Moses 90+3' (pen)	Report
27	28 February 2015	Hull City	H	1–0	26,473	Crouch 71'	Report
28	4 March 2015	Everton	H	2–0	26,431	Moses 32', Diouf 84'	Report
29	14 March 2015	West Bromwich Albion	A	0–1	24,323		Report
30	21 March 2015	Crystal Palace	H	1–2	27,532	Diouf 14'	Report
31	4 April 2015	Chelsea	A	1–2	41,098	Adam 44'	Report
32	11 April 2015	West Ham United	A	1–1	34,946	Arnautović 90+5'	Report
33	18 April 2015	Southampton	H	2–1	26,467	Diouf 47', Adam 84'	Report
34	25 April 2015	Sunderland	H	1–1	26,706	Adam 27'	Report
35	2 May 2015	Swansea City	A	0–2	20,611		Report
36	9 May 2015	Tottenham Hotspur	H	3–0	27,104	Adam 21', Nzonzi 32', Vertonghen (o.g.) 86'	Report
37	16 May 2015	Burnley	A	0–0	18,636		Report
38	24 May 2015	Liverpool	H	6–1	27,602	Diouf (2) 22', 26', Walters 30', Adam 41', Nzonzi 45', Crouch 86'	Report

=== Final league table ===
Pos	Team	Pld	W	D	L	GF	GA	GD	Pts	Qualification or relegation
7	Southampton	38	18	6	14	54	33	+21	60	Qualification for the Europa League third qualifying round (Note: Since winners of the 2014–15 FA Cup, Arsenal, and winners of the 2014–15 Football League Cup, Chelsea, qualified for the Champions League based on league position, the spot awarded to the FA Cup winners (Europa League group stage) was passed to the sixth-placed team, Liverpool, and the spot awarded to the League Cup winners (Europa League third qualifying round) was passed to the seventh-placed team, Southampton, since those teams were the first teams in the table not already qualified for any European competition.)
8	Swansea City	38	16	8	14	46	49	−3	56	
9	Stoke City	38	15	9	14	48	45	+3	54	
10	Crystal Palace	38	13	9	16	47	51	−4	48	
11	Everton	38	12	11	15	48	50	−2	47	

Source: Barclays Premier League
Rules for classification: 1) Points; 2) Goal difference; 3) Goals scored; 4) Play-offs (only if needed to decide champion, teams for relegation or teams for UEFA competitions).

== FA Cup ==
Stoke were drawn at home against Conference Premier side Wrexham in the FA Cup third round. Stoke put in a disappointing display against the non-league side and fell behind after 73 minutes to a Mark Carrington header. However Stoke avoided an embarrassing exit as a close range tap-in from Marko Arnautović and a brace from Stephen Ireland in the final ten minutes saw the Potters progress 3–1. In the fourth round Stoke came up against League One Rochdale at Spotland. Bojan volleyed Stoke into an early lead before he went off injured. From then on Rochdale had the better of the first half but were unable to beat Jack Butland. After half-time Stoke scored through Stephen Ireland, Victor Moses and Jonathan Walters with Rhys Bennett getting a consolation for the Dale. Stoke faced Championship side Blackburn Rovers in the fifth round and despite Peter Crouch scoring an early goal Stoke crashed to a 4–1 defeat.

Round	Date	Opponent	Venue	Result	Attendance	Scorers	Report
R3	4 January 2015	Wrexham	H	3–1	19,423	Arnautović 80', Ireland (2) 88', 90+4'	Report
R4	26 January 2015	Rochdale	A	4–1	7,443	Bojan 4', Ireland 52', Moses 61', Walters 90+3'	Report
R5	14 February 2015	Blackburn Rovers	A	1–4	13,934	Crouch 10'	Report

== League Cup ==
Stoke were drawn at home to League Two side Portsmouth in the second round of the League Cup. The Potters were able to claim a 3–0 victory with a brace from Jonathan Walters and a strike from Peter Crouch. It was a comfortable victory for Stoke and manager Mark Hughes was able to give a professional debut to academy player Ollie Shenton. Stoke faced fellow Premier League side Sunderland in the fourth round and despite falling behind to a Jozy Altidore strike, two goals from Marc Muniesa earned Stoke their first ever win at the Stadium of Light and progression to the next round. In the Fourth Round Stoke faced Southampton and after an abject first half display found themselves 2–0 down. Stoke improved in the second half and goals from Steven Nzonzi and Mame Biram Diouf brought it back level before Peter Crouch was then sent-off for two bookable offences and the Saints went and scored the decisive third goal.

Round	Date	Opponent	Venue	Result	Attendance	Scorers	Report
R2	27 August 2014	Portsmouth	H	3–0	10,312	Walters (2) 16', 47', Crouch 90'	Report
R3	23 September 2014	Sunderland	A	2–1	17,353	Muniesa (2) 31',71'	Report
R4	29 October 2014	Southampton	H	2–3	16,340	Nzonzi 49', Diouf 82'	Report

== Squad statistics ==
No.	Pos.	Name	Premier League		FA Cup		League Cup		Total		Discipline	
No.	Pos.	Name	Apps	Goals	Apps	Goals	Apps	Goals	Apps	Goals	Yellow card	Red card
1	GK	(Bosnia and Herzegovina) Asmir Begović	35	0	0	0	1	0	36	0	3	0
2	DF	(Scotland) Phil Bardsley	24(1)	0	3	0	2	0	29(1)	0	9	0
3	DF	(Netherlands) Erik Pieters	29(2)	0	0	0	1	0	30(2)	0	7	0
4	DF	(Germany) Robert Huth	0(1)	0	1	0	2	0	3(1)	0	1	0
5	DF	(Spain) Marc Muniesa	14(5)	0	1	0	2	2	17(5)	2	3	0
6	MF	(Republic of Ireland) Glenn Whelan	26(2)	0	2	0	0	0	28(2)	0	7	0
7	MF	(Republic of Ireland) Stephen Ireland	11(6)	0	0(2)	3	1	0	12(8)	3	3	0
8	MF	(Honduras) Wilson Palacios	0	0	0	0	0	0	0	0	0	0
9	FW	(Nigeria) Peter Odemwingie	1(6)	0	0	0	1	0	2(6)	0	0	0
10	FW	(Austria) Marko Arnautović	20(9)	1	3	1	2(1)	0	25(10)	2	3	0
11	MF	(United States) Brek Shea	0	0	0	0	0	0	0	0	0	0
12	DF	(Republic of Ireland) Marc Wilson	25(2)	0	2	0	1	0	28(2)	0	8	1
13	FW	(Nigeria) Victor Moses	19	3	2	1	1(1)	0	22(1)	4	3	0
14	MF	(Scotland) Jamie Ness	0	0	0	0	0	0	0	0	0	0
15	MF	(France) Steven Nzonzi	38	3	2	0	2	1	42	4	3	0
16	MF	(Scotland) Charlie Adam	15(14)	7	1(2)	0	2(1)	0	18(17)	7	7	0
17	DF	(England) Ryan Shawcross (c)	32	2	2	0	3	0	37	2	6	0
18	FW	(Senegal) Mame Biram Diouf	28(6)	11	2	0	2	1	32(6)	12	8	0
19	FW	(Republic of Ireland) Jonathan Walters	28(4)	8	1(1)	1	2	2	31(5)	11	5	0
20	DF	(United States) Geoff Cameron	21(6)	0	2	0	2	0	25(6)	0	4	1
21	MF	(England) Steve Sidwell	5(7)	0	1(2)	0	0(1)	0	6(10)	0	4	0
22	GK	(England) Jack Butland	3	0	3	0	2	0	8	0	0	0
23	DF	(Slovakia) Dionatan Teixeira	0(1)	0	0	0	0	0	0(1)	0	0	0
24	MF	(Morocco) Oussama Assaidi	1(8)	0	1	0	1	0	3(8)	0	1	0
25	FW	(England) Peter Crouch	17(16)	8	1(1)	1	1(2)	1	19(19)	10	4	1
26	DF	(Germany) Philipp Wollscheid	12	0	2	0	0	0	14	0	5	0
27	FW	(Spain) Bojan Krkić	14(2)	4	1	1	1	0	16(2)	5	3	0
28	DF	(England) Andy Wilkinson	0	0	0(1)	0	1	0	1(1)	0	0	0
29	GK	(Denmark) Thomas Sørensen	0	0	0	0	0	0	0	0	0	0
31	MF	(England) Charlie Ward	0	0	0	0	0	0	0	0	0	0
34	MF	(England) Ollie Shenton	0(1)	0	0	0	0(1)	0	0(2)	0	0	0
35	GK	(Austria) Daniel Bachmann	0	0	0	0	0	0	0	0	0	0
–	–	Own goals	–	1	–	0	–	0	–	1	–	–

== Transfers ==
=== In ===
Date	Pos.	Name	From	Fee	Ref.
22 May 2014	DF	(Scotland) Phil Bardsley	(England) Sunderland	Free	
9 June 2014	MF	(England) Steve Sidwell	(England) Fulham	Free	
11 June 2014	FW	(Senegal) Mame Biram Diouf	(Germany) Hannover 96	Free	
11 June 2014	DF	(Slovakia) Dionatan Teixeira	(Slovakia) Dukla Banská Bystrica	Undisclosed	
22 July 2014	FW	(Spain) Bojan Krkić	(Spain) Barcelona	Undisclosed	

=== Out ===
Date	Pos.	Name	To	Fee	Ref.
23 May 2014	MF	(England) Matthew Etherington	Released	Free	
23 May 2014	MF	(England) Lucas Dawson	Released	Free	
23 May 2014	MF	(Netherlands) Kevin Gomez-Nieto	(Netherlands) Helmond Sport	Free	
23 May 2014	DF	(England) Ben Heneghan	(England) Chester	Free	
23 May 2014	DF	(Republic of Ireland) Jordan Keane	(England) Alfreton Town	Free	
23 May 2014	MF	(England) Jordan Richardson	Released	Free	
23 May 2014	FW	(Switzerland) Karim Rossi	(England) Hull City	Free	
27 June 2014	MF	(England) Michael Kightly	(England) Burnley	Undisclosed	
20 August 2014	FW	(England) Cameron Jerome	(England) Norwich City	Undisclosed	
19 December 2014	MF	(United States) Brek Shea	(United States) Orlando City	Undisclosed	
1 January 2015	DF	(England) Ryan Shotton	(England) Derby County	Undisclosed	
8 January 2015	MF	(United States) Maurice Edu	(United States) Philadelphia Union	Undisclosed	

=== Loan in ===
Date from	Date to	Pos.	Name	From	Ref.
16 August 2014	30 June 2015	FW	(Nigeria) Victor Moses	(England) Chelsea	
1 September 2014	11 January 2015	MF	(Morocco) Oussama Assaidi	(England) Liverpool	
7 January 2015	30 June 2015	DF	(Germany) Philipp Wollscheid	(Germany) Bayer Leverkusen	

=== Loan out ===
Date from	Date to	Pos.	Name	To	Ref.
5 August 2014	30 June 2015	GK	(Austria) Daniel Bachmann	(Wales) Wrexham	
9 August 2014	9 September 2014	FW	(England) James Alabi	(England) Accrington Stanley	
14 August 2014	1 January 2015	MF	(Scotland) Jamie Ness	(England) Crewe Alexandra	
25 August 2014	1 January 2015	DF	(England) Ryan Shotton	(England) Derby County	
11 September 2014	13 December 2014	MF	(United States) Brek Shea	(England) Birmingham City	
20 October 2014	27 November 2014	GK	(England) Jack Butland	(England) Derby County	
20 October 2014	19 January 2015	DF	(England) Andy Wilkinson	(England) Millwall	
8 January 2015	30 June 2015	FW	(England) George Waring	(England) Barnsley	
2 February 2015	30 June 2015	DF	(Germany) Robert Huth	(England) Leicester City	
