= Lucas Dawson (English footballer) =

English footballer

Personal information
- Full name: Lucas Jay Dawson
- Date of birth: 12 November 1993 (age 32)
- Place of birth: Stoke-on-Trent, England
- Position: Midfielder

Youth career
- 2005–2012: Stoke City

Senior career*
Years	Team	Apps	(Gls)
2012–2014	Stoke City	0	(0)
2014	→ Carlisle United (loan)	1	(0)
2015	Nuneaton Town	7	(0)
2015–2016	AFC Telford United	40	(5)
2017–2018	Chester	30	(4)
- * Club domestic league appearances and goals as of 21:49, 16 November 2017 (UTC)

Lucas Jay Dawson (born 12 November 1993) is an English retired footballer who played as a midfielder.

== Career ==
Dawson was born in Stoke-on-Trent and began his career at Stoke City where he progressed through the youth ranks at the club, eventually becoming captain of the under-18s. He was given first-team experience by manager Tony Pulis after being named on the bench against Beşiktaş and Valencia in the UEFA Europa League during the 2011–12 season. He advanced to the under-21s for the 2012–13 and 2013–14 campaigns and joined League One side Carlisle United on loan in March 2014. He made his professional debut on 21 April 2014 against Peterborough United. Dawson was released by Stoke in May 2014.

Dawson joined Conference Premier side Nuneaton Town on 18 March 2015. He signed with Chester in March 2017.

He had a trial for Crewe Alexandra in September 2018.

== Career statistics ==
As of match played 21 April 2014

Club	Season	League			FA Cup		League Cup		Other^{[A]}		Total	
Club	Season	Division	Apps	Goals	Apps	Goals	Apps	Goals	Apps	Goals	Apps	Goals
Stoke City	2013–14	Premier League	0	0	0	0	0	0	0	0	0	0
Carlisle United (loan)	2013–14	League One	1	0	0	0	0	0	0	0	1	0
Career total			1	0	0	0	0	0	0	0	1	0

A. The "Other" column constitutes appearances and goals in the Football League Trophy.
