= Matthew Etherington =

English footballer (born 1981)

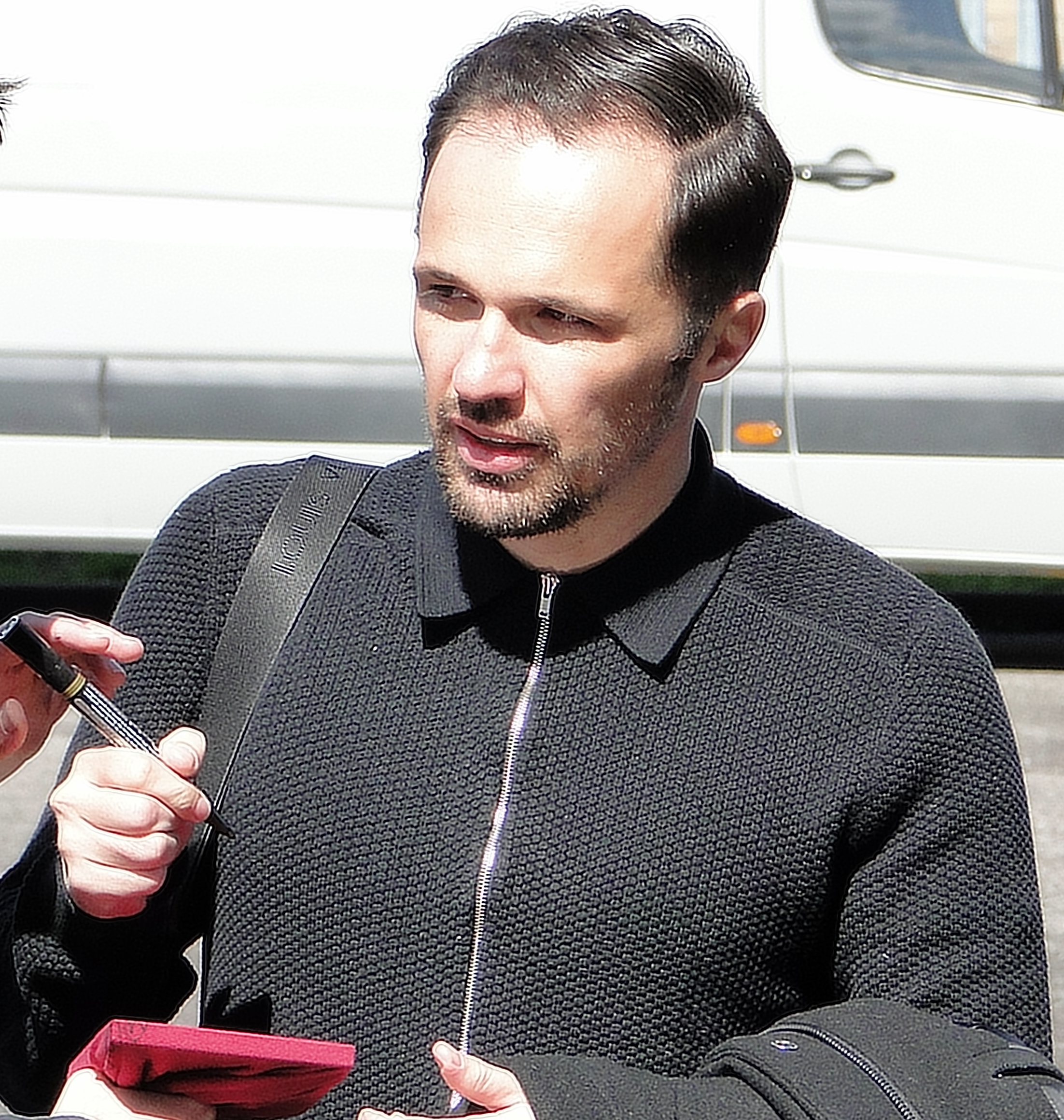
- Etherington in 2015

Personal information
- Full name: Matthew Etherington
- Date of birth: 14 August 1981 (age 45)
- Place of birth: Truro, England
- Height: 1.78 m (5 ft 10 in)
- Position: Left winger

Team information
- Current team: Southampton (Under-21 assistant)

Youth career
- Falmouth Town
- Peterborough United

Senior career*
Years	Team	Apps	(Gls)
1997–2000	Peterborough United	51	(6)
2000–2003	Tottenham Hotspur	45	(1)
2001	→ Bradford City (loan)	13	(1)
2003–2009	West Ham United	165	(16)
2009–2014	Stoke City	152	(13)
Total		426	(37)

International career
1997–1998	England U16	5	(0)
1999	England U18	3	(0)
1999	England U20	3	(0)
2002	England U21	3	(0)

Managerial career
- 2022: Peterborough United (caretaker)
- 2022: Crawley Town
- 2023–2024: Colchester United
- * Club domestic league appearances and goals

Matthew Etherington (born 14 August 1981) is an English professional football manager and former footballer who is Under-21 assistant at Southampton. As a player, Etherington played as a winger, most notably in the Premier League for Tottenham Hotspur, West Ham United and Stoke City.

Born in Truro, Cornwall, Etherington began his footballing career at Peterborough United and was a stand-out performer for the Posh, which attracted the attention of Premier League clubs. He joined Tottenham Hotspur in 2000, along with Simon Davies. He struggled at Tottenham and left for West Ham United in 2003. At the East London club, Etherington showed his true form and became a vital player for the Hammers. However, he had personal problems related to an addiction to gambling and in 2009 was sold by manager Gianfranco Zola to fellow Premier League side Stoke City.

At Stoke, Etherington became a vital member of the side under manager Tony Pulis, winning the player of the year award for the 2009–10 season and also played in the 2011 FA Cup final. Etherington remained a regular under Pulis in 2011–12 and 2012–13 before he was released by Mark Hughes at the end of the 2013–14 season.

== Club career ==
=== Peterborough United ===
Born in Truro, Cornwall, Etherington came through the youth ranks at Peterborough United after being spotted by Barry Fry playing for Falmouth Town under-14s. He made his debut in the Football League aged 15 years and 262 days in a 2–1 win at Brentford on 3 May 1997. He made a further two appearances in the following season but made his breakthrough into the first team in 1998–99 when he made 33 appearances in all competitions, scoring three goals. He went on trial at Manchester United in July 1999, but at the end of December 1999, he joined Tottenham Hotspur in a deal that valued him at £500,000. He made a total of 58 appearances for Peterborough in all competitions, scoring six goals.

=== Tottenham Hotspur ===
Etherington joined Tottenham in a move that saw Simon Davies join the North London club as part of the same deal. Etherington struggled to establish himself during his three-year stint at Spurs and, in 2001, spent two months on loan to Bradford City, where he made 13 appearances and scored one goal, against Watford.

Having only started five Premier League matches since arriving from Peterborough in 1999, he handed in a transfer request in June 2002, saying he decided his career would be best served away from Spurs. However, no transfer was forthcoming, and he broke into the first team during the 2002–03 season, when he made 25 appearances. despite a lay-off with an ankle injury. He scored his first Premier League goal in a 2–2 draw with Everton on 17 August 2002.

In August 2003, Etherington joined West Ham United in an exchange deal plus cash for Frédéric Kanouté amid a formal complaint made to the FA by Peterborough at the valuation placed on Etherington, who would have benefited from a sell-off clause had it been greater than £500,000, the price at which Peterborough sold Etherington to Tottenham in 1999. Etherington made 51 appearances for Tottenham, 28 of these as a substitute, scoring two goals against Bolton Wanderers in the FA Cup and Everton in the Premier League.

=== West Ham United ===
Etherington joined West Ham at the beginning of their two-year spell in the second-tier of English football, playing the final season of the First Division and the first of the Championship. Signed by manager Glenn Roeder, he was part of a transfer deal which saw West Ham player Frédéric Kanouté move to Tottenham and Etherington and £3.5 million coming to West Ham. Etherington's West Ham debut came on 9 August 2003 as he created the chance for David Connolly to score West Ham's winning goal in a 2–1 away win at Preston North End. His opening goal came just over a month later, on 16 September 2003. Now under the managership of Trevor Brooking, following the sacking of Glenn Roeder, West Ham beat Crewe Alexandra 3–0 at Gresty Road in the first ever Football League meeting between the clubs, with Etherington scoring the third goal. His only red card during his West Ham career was in a 1–1 away draw with Norwich City on 21 February 2004 when he was sent off for two bookable offences.

Etherington was a hit at Upton Park, scoring several goals including a hat-trick in a 5–0 win over Wimbledon on 9 March 2004. He won the "Hammer of the Year" award in his first season at the club and played a significant part in helping the club get to the 2004 Championship play-off final by scoring in the 2–0 win over Ipswich Town in the second leg of the play-off semi-final. Etherington played in the final as West Ham lost 1–0 to Crystal Palace.

The following year, West Ham reached the play-off final again, with Etherington setting up the goal in the final against Preston North End with a perfectly timed cross which was scored by Bobby Zamora, which sent West Ham back into the Premier League. In 2005–06, West Ham made the FA Cup final before losing on penalties to Liverpool. Etherington scored in the 4–2, fourth round win against Blackburn Rovers and played in the final at the Millennium Stadium in Cardiff in May 2006. He was a regular member of the team for seasons 2003–04, 2004–05 and 2005–06, his appearances being more sporadic in the following three seasons. Etherington eventually lost his place in the starting XI due to Gianfranco Zola's preference to play younger players. He completed 195 games for West Ham, in all competitions, scoring 18 goals, before being sold to Stoke City on 8 January 2009.

=== Stoke City ===
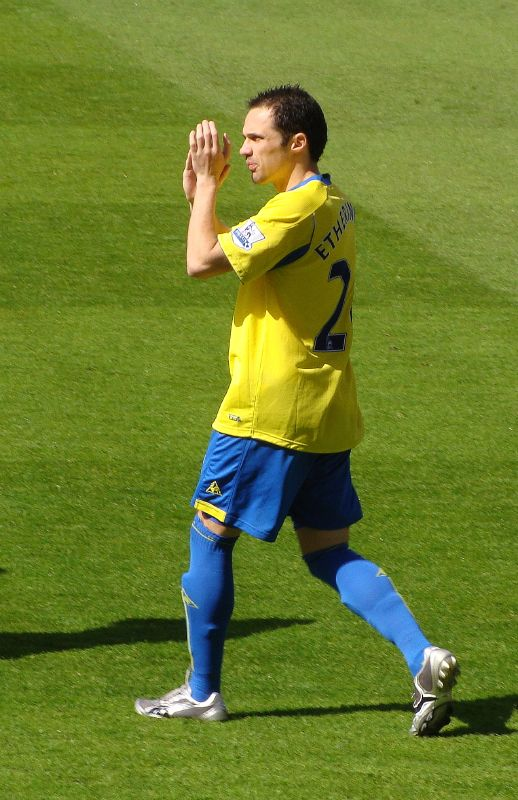
Etherington with Stoke City in 2009

On 8 January 2009, Etherington completed a transfer, thought to be for £2 million, from West Ham United to Stoke City, signing a three-and-a-half-year contract. He made his debut for Stoke two days after his transfer, against Liverpool in the Premier League, in a match which finished goalless. He was sent off in his fifth game with Stoke for kicking out at Danny Collins as his side lost 2–0 to Sunderland. He scored his first goal for Stoke in a 4–3 League Cup win over Blackpool on 22 September 2009. Etherington scored his first League goal for Stoke in a 2–2 draw with Wolverhampton Wanderers. Etherington went on to have a successful season for Stoke which led him to win the player of the year award. Etherington signed a new four-year contract with Stoke on 11 July 2010.

Etherington started the 2010–11 season in fine form providing a number of assists from corners and left midfield. He scored his first goal of the season in a 3–0 win over West Bromwich Albion and followed this up by scoring a last minute equaliser against Manchester City a week later and then scored another against Wigan Athletic. He scored the opening goal in the FA Cup semi-final as Stoke defeated Bolton Wanderers 5–0, clinching a first FA Cup Final appearance in their 148-year history. Etherington described the performance as the match of their lives. On 28 April, in a match against Wolverhampton Wanderers, Etherington tore his hamstring, leaving him in doubt for the FA Cup Final. He ultimately regained fitness for the final as Stoke lost 1–0 to Manchester City.

In the 2011–12 season, Etherington was again the club's only recognised left winger and he scored twice against his old club Tottenham on 11 December 2011. After some indifferent performances, he has admitted his form has dipped since the previous season. He made his 100th Premier League appearance for Stoke against Fulham on 11 February 2012. He scored the winning goal against Norwich City on 3 March 2012. Etherington lost his place in Tony Pulis' starting line up at the start of the 2012–13 season due to the signing of Michael Kightly, which restricted him to making cameo appearances from the substitutes' bench. He regained his starting place in November 2012. However, Etherington struggled with form and fitness throughout the campaign. He made 33 appearances in 2012–13 as Stoke finished in 13th position and the end of the season, Tony Pulis left the club and was replaced by Mark Hughes.

Hughes changed the team's style of play for the 2013–14 season, and while Etherington stated Stoke had adapted well, a lack of goals was still a concern. As the season progressed, Etherington lost his place in the side to Oussama Assaidi. Etherington left Stoke at the end of the 2013–14 season.

After leaving Stoke, Etherington began training with Millwall and had an offer from manager Ian Holloway to join the club. However, he turned it down and announced his decision to retire from football in December 2014, due to a back injury which he had been suffering from for some time.

== International career ==
Etherington appeared for the England Under-20 team at the 1999 FIFA U-20 World Cup, playing alongside players such as Stuart Taylor, Ashley Cole, Peter Crouch and Andy Johnson. However, the team failed to score a single goal in their three group matches, and finished bottom of their group.

== Coaching career ==
In May 2018, Etherington was announced as manager of the under-18 team at Peterborough United, rejoining the club where he started his career over 20 years earlier.

On 12 November 2021, Etherington was made assistant manager at Peterborough following the departure of Mark Robson. Following the departure of Darren Ferguson as manager, Etherington became interim manager of the club on 22 February 2022. He led the team in a 2–1 loss at leaders Fulham the following day, and Grant McCann was permanently appointed the day after that.

On 27 November 2022, he was appointed as the manager of 19th-placed EFL League Two club Crawley Town, succeeding interim boss Lewis Young. He named his former Peterborough and Tottenham teammate Simon Davies as his assistant. On 3 December, the team won 2–0 at home to Swindon Town on his first game in charge. On 29 December, Etherington and Davies departed the club after just three matches that saw one victory and two defeats. In the statement announcing their departure, Crawley's CEO Chris Galley said that the partnership was not the right fit to carry the club forward.

In June 2023, Etherington was appointed under-21 lead coach at League Two club Colchester United. Following the departure of Ben Garner in October 2023, he was appointed caretaker manager. Having already overseen a match in interim control, he had to step down from his position following a contract dispute between Colchester and Etherington's former club Crawley. Crawley Town had claimed that he was still under contract until May 2024 and that if he oversaw their fixture against Accrington Stanley, a buy-out fee would be owed. He was reinstated as interim head coach on 31 October. He was given the job on a permanent basis on 16 November, having picked up ten points from four matches during his interim spell in charge. On 1 January 2024, Etherington was sacked following a 1–0 defeat to Gillingham, adding to a poor run of eight losses in nine matches in his spell as permanent manager.

In February 2024, Etherington returned to Colchester United and was appointed under-21 lead coach.

On 23 September 2024, he joined Southampton as under-21 assistant.

== Personal life ==
Etherington had a gambling addiction while he was at West Ham, who issued him a £300,000 loan after he accumulated debts in excess of £800,000. He also spent time at Tony Adams' Sporting Chance Clinic. Matthew's father, Peter, has thanked Stoke City for saving his son's career and helping him to combat his gambling addiction. In 2015, Etherington spoke to BBC journalist Victoria Derbyshire concerning the impact of gambling on professional footballers. His own debts caused by gambling throughout his career were reported as £1.5 million.

== Career statistics ==
Appearances and goals by club, season and competition
Club	Season	League			FA Cup		League Cup		Europe		Other		Total	
Club	Season	Division	Apps	Goals	Apps	Goals	Apps	Goals	Apps	Goals	Apps	Goals	Apps	Goals
Peterborough United	1996–97	Second Division	1	0	0	0	0	0	—		0	0	1	0
Peterborough United	1997–98	Third Division	2	0	0	0	0	0	—		0	0	2	0
Peterborough United	1998–99	Third Division	29	3	1	0	1	0	—		2 (Note: Appearances in Football League Trophy)	0	33	3
Peterborough United	1999–2000	Third Division	19	3	2	0	1	0	—		0	0	22	3
Peterborough United	Total		51	6	3	0	2	0	0	0	2	0	58	6
Tottenham Hotspur	1999–2000	Premier League	5	0	0	0	0	0	—		—		5	0
Tottenham Hotspur	2000–01	Premier League	6	0	1	0	1	0	—		—		8	0
Tottenham Hotspur	2001–02	Premier League	11	0	1	1	1	0	—		—		13	1
Tottenham Hotspur	2002–03	Premier League	23	1	0	0	2	0	—		—		25	1
Tottenham Hotspur	Total		45	1	2	1	4	0	0	0	0	0	51	2
Bradford City (loan)	2001–02	First Division	13	1	0	0	0	0	—		—		13	1
West Ham United	2003–04	First Division	35	5	4	0	3	0	—		3 (Note: Appearances in First Division play-offs)	1	45	6
West Ham United	2004–05	Championship	39	4	0	0	2	0	—		3 (Note: Appearances in Championship play-offs)	0	44	4
West Ham United	2005–06	Premier League	33	2	7	1	0	0	—		—		40	3
West Ham United	2006–07	Premier League	27	0	1	0	1	0	1 (Note: Appearance in UEFA Cup)	0	—		30	0
West Ham United	2007–08	Premier League	18	3	2	0	1	0	—		—		21	3
West Ham United	2008–09	Premier League	13	2	1	0	1	0	—		—		15	2
West Ham United	Total		165	16	15	1	8	0	1	0	6	1	195	18
Stoke City	2008–09	Premier League	14	0	0	0	0	0	—		—		14	0
Stoke City	2009–10	Premier League	34	5	3	1	1	1	—		—		38	7
Stoke City	2010–11	Premier League	32	5	6	1	2	0	—		—		40	6
Stoke City	2011–12	Premier League	30	3	2	0	2	0	6 (Note: Appearances in UEFA Europa League)	0	—		40	3
Stoke City	2012–13	Premier League	31	0	2	0	0	0	—		—		33	0
Stoke City	2013–14	Premier League	11	0	0	0	1	0	—		—		12	0
Stoke City	Total		152	13	13	2	6	1	6	0	0	0	177	16
Career total			426	37	33	4	20	1	7	0	8	1	494	43

== Managerial statistics ==
As of 1 January 2024

Managerial record by team and tenure
Team	From	To	Record				
Team	From	To	P	W	D	L	Win %
Peterborough United	22 February 2022	25 February 2022	1	0	0	1	0.00
Crawley Town	27 November 2022	29 December 2022	3	1	0	2	33.33
Colchester United	22 October 2023	1 January 2024	16	5	1	10	31.25
Total			20	6	1	13	30.00

== Honours ==
West Ham United

- Football League Championship play-offs: 2005
- FA Cup runner-up: 2005–06

Stoke City

- FA Cup runner-up: 2010–11

Individual

- PFA Team of the Year: 1998–99 Third Division
- West Ham United Player of the Year: 2003–04
- Stoke City Player of the Year: 2009–10
