= Ryan Shotton =

English footballer

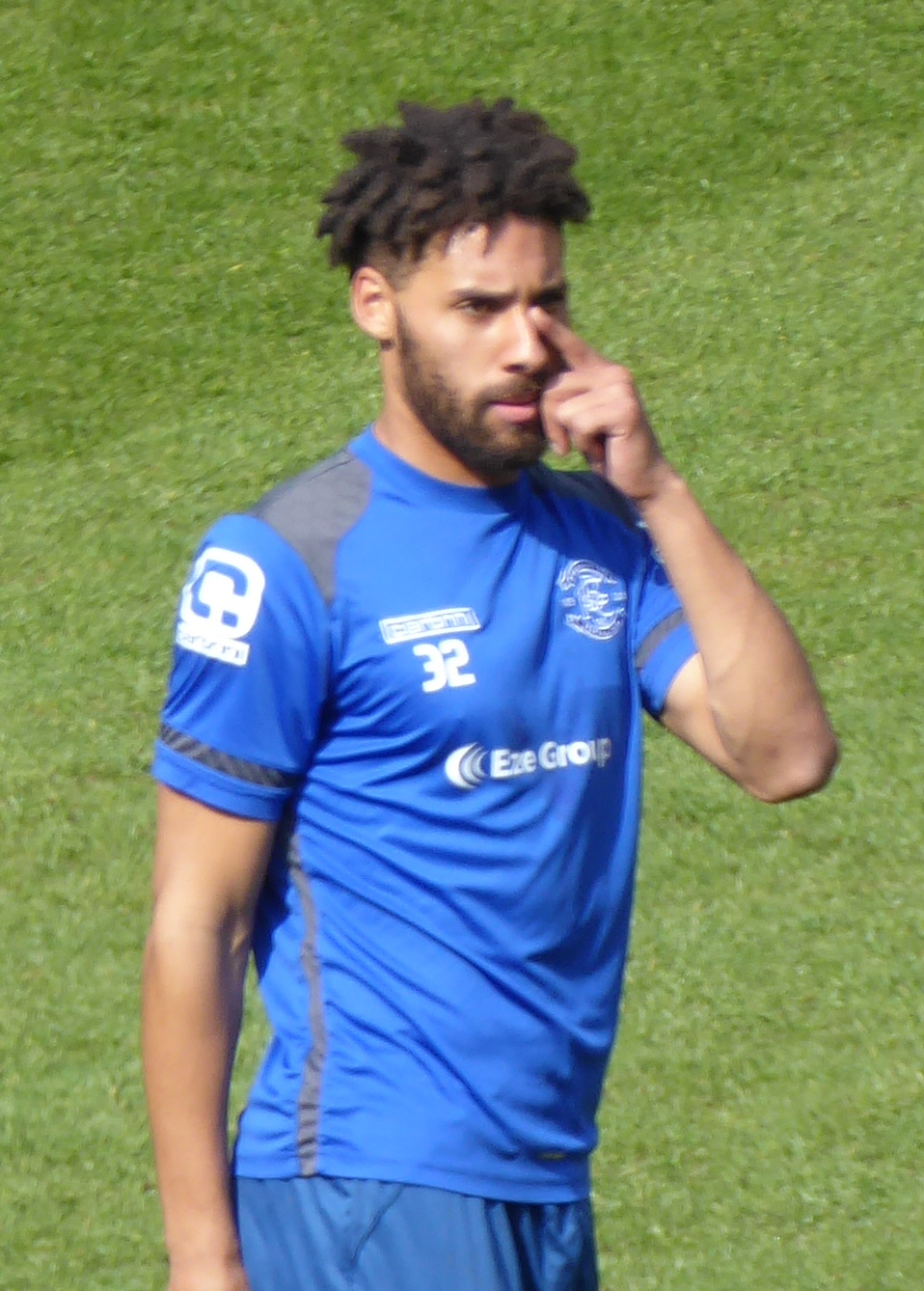
- Shotton playing for Birmingham City in April 2016

Personal information
- Full name: Ryan Colin Shotton
- Date of birth: 30 October 1988 (age 38)
- Place of birth: Fenton, Stoke-on-Trent, England
- Height: 6 ft 3 in (1.91 m)
- Position: Defender

Youth career
- 2005–2007: Stoke City

Senior career*
Years	Team	Apps	(Gls)
2007–2015	Stoke City	48	(1)
2007–2008	→ Altrincham (loan)	34	(5)
2008–2009	→ Tranmere Rovers (loan)	33	(5)
2009–2010	→ Barnsley (loan)	30	(0)
2013	→ Wigan Athletic (loan)	9	(1)
2014	→ Derby County (loan)	12	(2)
2015–2016	Derby County	19	(0)
2016	→ Birmingham City (loan)	9	(1)
2016–2017	Birmingham City	44	(2)
2017–2020	Middlesbrough	75	(1)
2020	Leek Town	1	(0)
2020–2021	Melbourne Victory	8	(0)
2021–2024	Hanley Town	61	(3)

Managerial career
- 2022–2024: Hanley Town
- * Club domestic league appearances and goals as of 14:20, 4 October 2024 (UTC)

Ryan Colin Shotton (born 30 October 1988) is an English professional footballer and manager who plays as a defender. He was most recently player-manager of Northern Premier League Division One West club Hanley Town.

Shotton progressed through the Stoke City Academy and signed a professional contract in 2007. He went on loan to Altrincham, Tranmere Rovers and Barnsley respectively to gain first team experience. He broke into the Stoke squad towards the end of the 2010–11 season. He played in the UEFA Europa League in 2011–12 scoring against Maccabi Tel Aviv. In September 2013 Shotton joined Wigan Athletic on loan. He then joined Derby County on loan in August 2014 before completing a permanent move in January 2015. In 2016, he spent time on loan at Birmingham City, and signed for them permanently in June of that year, before moving on to Middlesbrough in August 2017 where he spent three seasons. He played briefly for Leek Town before joining A-League club Melbourne Victory in 2020.

== Career ==
=== Stoke City ===
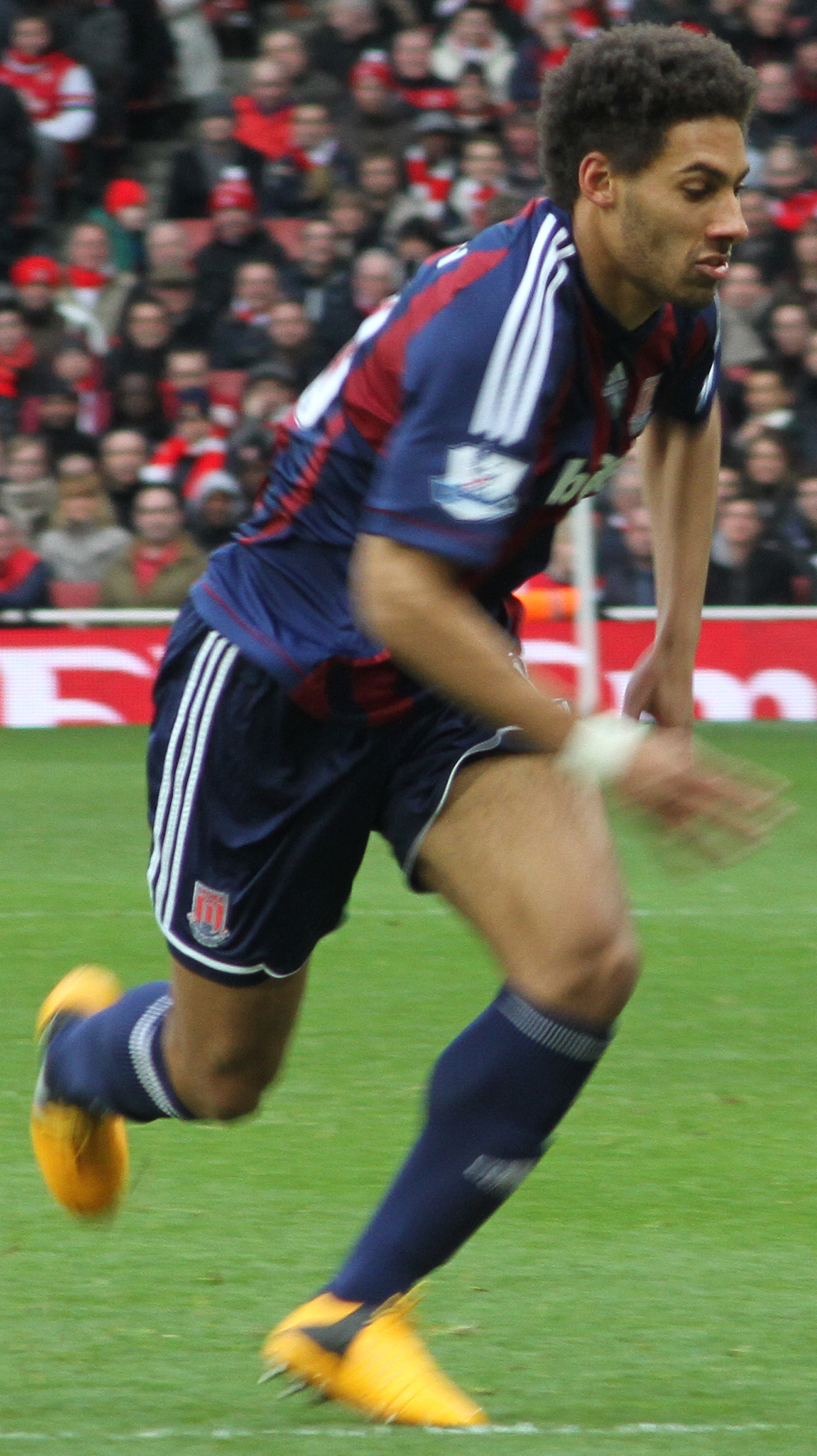
Shotton playing for Stoke City in 2013

Born in Fenton, Staffordshire, Shotton joined his local league side, Stoke City, where he progressed through the youth ranks and was handed a professional contract in 2007. He then moved on loan to Altrincham of the Conference National, where he spent most of the 2007–08 season. He began at centre back before slotting into the right-back position, and he also played some matches as a forward, scoring five goals. Shotton won the Supporters' Player of the Year award for his performances on loan at Altrincham. He made his debut for Stoke on 26 August 2008 in a 3–2 victory over Cheltenham Town in the League Cup, coming on as a substitute in the 90th minute.

He then joined League One club Tranmere Rovers on a one-month loan on 29 August 2008, and made his debut four days later, at home to Accrington Stanley in a 1–0 win in the Football League Trophy. He scored his first goal for Tranmere away at Huddersfield Town, heading in the winner to clinch a 2–1 victory. His loan at Rovers was extended until the end of the 2008–09 season. On 23 September 2009 Shotton and teammate Carl Dickinson joined Championship side Barnsley on loan for three months. Both spent the entire season with the club, and Shotton made 30 appearances.

Shotton signed a two-year contract extension in September 2010 keeping him at the Britannia Stadium until 2013. He made his first appearance on the Stoke bench for a league game against Wigan Athletic in December 2010. He made his home debut for Stoke in an FA Cup match against Cardiff City on 8 January 2011 and played the full 90 minutes. He described it as one of the proudest moments of his life.

"It was absolutely unbelievable really when the gaffer told me I was in the team, and it was such a proud moment for me. The gaffer pulled me aside on Tuesday and told me to prepare myself because I was in his mind for the game. Then on the morning of the game, he named his team and I was in there and it was such a surreal moment when I heard him tell me the news. I would be lying if I said there weren't any nerves because there were, so just to get out there and put in a decent performance was fantastic for me"

— Shotton on making his home debut for Stoke.

He made his Premier League debut for Stoke in a 0–0 draw with Blackpool at Bloomfield Road on 30 April 2011. Shotton appeared to have scored his first goal for Stoke in a 1–0 win over Hajduk Split in the UEFA Europa League where he was playing as a makeshift centre forward, but the goal was officially recorded as an own goal. He did score in the 89th minute of the Premier League match against West Bromwich Albion on 28 August to secure a 1–0 win, and scored in the Europa League against Maccabi Tel Aviv on 20 October. Shotton signed a new four-year contract with Stoke in November 2011. He made his first Premier League start for Stoke on 3 December, in an away win over Everton where he played at right midfield in place of Jermaine Pennant, and said that the first half of the season could not have gone better for him.

He was named Stoke's Young Player of the Season for 2011–12, despite an indifferent run of form after Christmas until the end of the season, and he began 2012–13 out of the first team frame. But following injuries to Marc Wilson and Andy Wilkinson, Shotton had the opportunity to return to the starting line-up in November 2012. He was warned by manager Tony Pulis that he needed to "get his head together" to remain in the side. He played 26 times for Stoke in 2012–13, as the Potters finished in 13th position, and often came in for criticism from supporters.

At the start of the 2013–14 season, Shotton failed to make force his way into new manager Mark Hughes' plans. A permanent transfer to Wigan Athletic fell through, but he joined the Championship club on loan until 2 January 2014. He made 14 appearances for the Latics, scoring once, in a 2–0 victory against Ipswich Town on 22 September.

=== Derby County ===
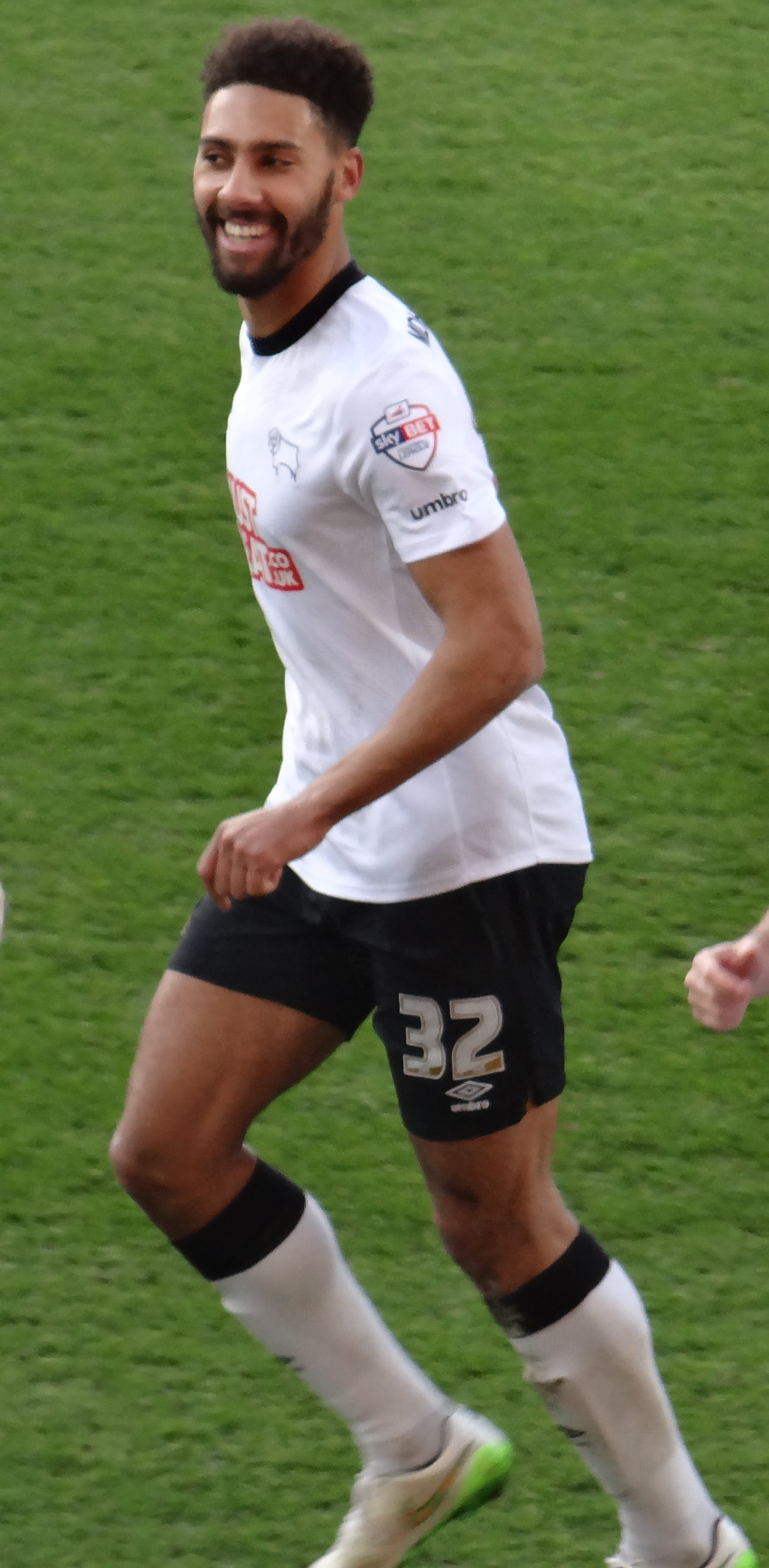
Shotton playing for Derby County in 2015

On 25 August 2014, Shotton joined Derby County on loan with a view to a permanent deal. He made the move permanent on 1 January 2015, signing a two-and-a-half-year contract for an undisclosed fee.

Shotton joined fellow Championship club Birmingham City on 28 January 2016 on loan until the end of the season. He made his debut on 13 February, replacing Paul Caddis at right back for the goalless draw at Rotherham United. He played in the next two matches before Caddis was restored to the starting eleven. His next appearance was five weeks later away at Reading; he started the match at centre back alongside Michael Morrison, and scored Birmingham's second goal in their 2–0 win after 27 minutes when David Cotterill's free kick was parried by Reading's goalkeeper. Playing in his preferred position and hoping for a permanent move, Shotton kept his place for the next five matches, and succeeded in impressing manager Gary Rowett to the extent that he would consider making an offer for the player if he were available.

=== Birmingham City ===
Shotton signed a three-year contract with Birmingham City on 30 June 2016. The fee was undisclosed, but was later reported to be around £300,000. He began the season partnering Morrison at the centre of a back four; he felt they worked well together, and the pair established themselves as a strong defensively sound pairing. Rowett commented that Shotton's athleticism enabled the team to defend higher up the pitch and that his concentration and decision-making were improving. The following week, Shotton admitted responsibility for slack marking that allowed Steven Caulker to score an equaliser for Queens Park Rangers, and then produced a fine performance as Birmingham drew 1–1 in the local derby against newly relegated Aston Villa in October – with his dreadlocks dyed blue for the occasion. He scored twice in the first half of the season: the opening goal in a 2–2 draw at home to Preston North End and Birmingham's second goal away to Brentford at the end of November that secured a 2–1 win. After that match, Rowett praised Shotton's progress both in terms of concentration and as Morrison's defensive partner – both had played every minute of the campaign thus far – but reminded him that he needed to remain focused in training as well as on the pitch.

Two weeks later, with the team just outside the play-off positions, Rowett was replaced by Gianfranco Zola, who retained Shotton and Morrison as his central defenders of choice in a three-man back line. In early February, Morrison underwent a hernia operation that was to keep him out until the last two matches of the season, and Shotton himself missed three matches with a groin injury. On his return, he played alongside a variety of defenders as Birmingham slipped towards relegation. Zola's replacement by Harry Redknapp with three matches left coincided with Morrison's return to the team, and in a final fixture that Shotton later compared to soldiers in the trenches, the pair helped Birmingham keep a clean sheet away to Bristol City to protect a 1–0 lead and secure Championship survival. He finished the season with 43 league appearances, more than any other Birmingham player.

Shotton said he was happy at Birmingham, and would consider extending his contract. But after the arrival of Marc Roberts as first choice alongside Morrison, and with the club actively pursuing other central defenders, Redknapp stated that Shotton wanted to leave. He reportedly turned down a move to Bristol City, and bids from Hull City and Middlesbrough were rejected by the club, but on 10 August Redknapp confirmed that a deal had been agreed with Middlesbrough, but that Shotton would not leave until replacements arrived. He was not included in the matchday squad until the fourth match of the season, at home to Bolton Wanderers, and when Morrison broke his nose in the first half, it was Shotton who replaced him. Wearing a protective mask, Morrison was fit to start the next match three days later and Shotton, whose wife had recently given birth, was again omitted. Eventually, with the transfer window closing and Birmingham about to sign Harlee Dean from Brentford, Shotton was free to complete his move to Middlesbrough.

=== Middlesbrough ===
Shotton signed a three-year contract with newly relegated Championship club Middlesbrough on 30 August 2017; the fee was undisclosed, though was widely reported as £3 million. He was offered a contract extension by manager Neil Warnock at the end of the season but ultimately decided to drop down to non-league football.

=== Leek Town ===
On 31 October 2020, Shotton made an FA Trophy appearance for Northern Premier League First Division South East club Leek Town. They lost 3–2 to Evesham United. Four days later he played a in a 3–2 League win against Ilkeston.

=== Melbourne Victory ===
Shotton signed for Melbourne Victory on 18 December 2020. He played seven A-League matches in the early part of 2021, but his season was disrupted first by a groin injury and then by a knee injury sustained during his comeback match, and he left the club by mutual consent in May.

=== Hanley Town ===
In August 2021, Shotton joined Midland League Premier Division side Hanley Town, managed by former Stoke City teammate Carl Dickinson. Following Dickinson's departure, Shotton was named player-manager.

In October 2024, following a poor start to the season, Shotton announced his departure from the club.

== Style of play ==
Shotton plays as a right back and due to his 6 ft 3 in (1.91 m) frame he can also be used as a makeshift centre forward. He also has the ability to perform a long throw-in similar to that of Rory Delap. Tony Pulis also played Shotton at right wing on a number of occasions.

== Personal life ==
His older brother, Liam, is also a footballer who played professionally in Singapore's S.League and in non-League football in England. His cousin Saul Shotton is also a footballer.

Shotton was charged with assault at a nightclub in Hanley in June 2012. He was found not guilty in December 2012. As of November 2020, Shotton owned the Black Lion pub in Cheddleton.

== Career statistics ==
As of match played 1 October 2024

Appearances and goals by club, season and competition
Club	Season	League			FA Cup		League Cup		Europe		Other		Total	
Club	Season	Division	Apps	Goals	Apps	Goals	Apps	Goals	Apps	Goals	Apps	Goals	Apps	Goals
Stoke City	2007–08	Championship	0	0	0	0	0	0	—		—		0	0
Stoke City	2008–09	Premier League	0	0	0	0	1	0	—		—		1	0
Stoke City	2009–10	Premier League	0	0	0	0	1	0	—		—		1	0
Stoke City	2010–11	Premier League	2	0	2	0	0	0	—		—		4	0
Stoke City	2011–12	Premier League	23	1	3	0	2	0	10 (Note: Appearances in UEFA Europa League)	1	—		38	2
Stoke City	2012–13	Premier League	23	0	2	0	1	0	—		—		26	0
Stoke City	2013–14	Premier League	0	0	0	0	0	0	—		—		0	0
Stoke City	Total		48	1	7	0	5	0	10	1	—		70	2
Altrincham (loan)	2007–08	Conference Premier	34	5	2	0	—		—		4 (Note: One appearance in FA Trophy, three appearances and two goals in Cheshire Senior Cup)	2	40	7
Tranmere Rovers (loan)	2008–09	League One	33	5	3	0	0	0	—		3 (Note: Appearance in Football League Trophy)	1	39	6
Barnsley (loan)	2009–10	Championship	30	0	1	0	0	0	—		—		31	0
Wigan Athletic (loan)	2013–14	Championship	9	1	0	0	1	0	4	0	—		14	1
Derby County	2014–15	Championship	25	2	2	0	2	0	—		—		29	2
Derby County	2015–16	Championship	6	0	1	0	0	0	—		—		7	0
Derby County	Total		31	2	3	0	2	0	—		—		36	2
Birmingham City (loan)	2015–16	Championship	9	1	—		—		—		—		9	1
Birmingham City	2016–17	Championship	43	2	2	0	0	0	—		—		45	2
Birmingham City	2017–18	Championship	1	0	—		1	0	—		—		2	0
Birmingham City	Total		53	3	2	0	1	0	—		—		56	3
Middlesbrough	2017–18	Championship	24	1	2	0	—		—		2 (Note: Appearances in EFL Championship play-offs)	0	28	1
Middlesbrough	2018–19	Championship	34	0	1	0	0	0	—		—		35	0
Middlesbrough	2019–20	Championship	21	0	0	0	0	0	—		—		21	0
Middlesbrough	Total		79	1	3	0	0	0	—		2	0	84	1
Middlesbrough U23	2017–18	—			—		—		—		1 (Note: Appearance in EFL Trophy)	0	1	0
Leek Town	2020–21	NPL First Division South East	1	0	—		—		—		1 (Note: Appearance in FA Trophy)	0	2	0
Melbourne Victory	2020–21	A-League	8	0	—		—		—		—		8	0
Hanley Town	2021–22	Midland League Premier Division	25	0	5	0	—		—		2 (Note: Two appearances in FA Vase)	0	32	0
Hanley Town	2022–23	Northern Premier League Division One West	16	2	4	0	—		—		2 (Note: One appearance in FA Trophy, one appearance in Staffordshire Senior Cup)	0	22	2
Hanley Town	2023–24	Northern Premier League Division One West	17	1	2	1	—		—		2 (Note: Appearances in FA Trophy)	0	21	2
Hanley Town	2024–25	Northern Premier League Division One West	3	0	1	0	—		—		2	1	6	1
Hanley Town	Total		61	3	12	1	—		—		8	1	81	5
Career total			387	21	33	1	9	0	14	1	19	4	462	27

== Honours ==
Stoke City

- FA Cup runner-up: 2010–11

Individual

- Stoke City Young Player of the Season: 2011–12
