= 2011–12 Stoke City F.C. season =

Stoke City
2011–12 season
- Chairman: Peter Coates
- Manager: Tony Pulis
- Stadium: Britannia Stadium
- Premier League: 14th (45 points)
- FA Cup: Quarter-finals
- League Cup: Fourth round
- UEFA Europa League: Round of 32
- Top goalscorer: League: Peter Crouch (10); All: Peter Crouch (14)
- Highest home attendance: 27,789 v Bolton Wanderers (13 May 2012)
- Lowest home attendance: 26,500 v Everton (1 May 2012)
- Average home league attendance: 27,216
Home colours	Away colours

The 2011–12 season was Stoke City's fourth season in the Premier League and the 56th in the top tier of English football. Because FA Cup winners Manchester City qualified for the UEFA Champions League via their third-place finish in the Premier League, as FA Cup runners-up, Stoke qualified for the UEFA Europa League.

Stoke's first excursion into European football for the first time since 1975 was a main talking point leading up to the 2011–12 season. Stoke were drawn against Croatian side Hajduk Split and after two legs ran out 2–0 winners. After beating FC Thun, Stoke were handed a tough group containing Beşiktaş, Dynamo Kyiv and Maccabi Tel Aviv which Stoke managed to progress through finishing in second position. City's reward was a tie against Spanish giants Valencia and despite putting up a spirited second leg performance Stoke went out 2–0 on aggregate.

With 12 fixtures in Europe, Stoke's Premier League form took a hit with some indifferent performances. The season started well with Stoke going four matches unbeaten and breaking the club's transfer record with the £10 million signing of Peter Crouch from Tottenham Hotspur. European football soon began to take its toll and with some poor defeats against the likes of Bolton Wanderers, Sunderland, Queens Park Rangers, Stoke failed to really cement their position in the top half of the table, and after picking up just four wins in the final half of the season, Stoke finished in 14th position with 45 points.

== Pre-season ==
The Stoke City squad returned to the club on 7 July before flying out to Austria for their annual training camp. Upon their return they played two of Tony Pulis's old clubs Newport County and Newport YMCA. Games against Football League sides Brentford, Aldershot Town and Sheffield Wednesday had also been arranged as well as the traditional match against Newcastle Town.

Whilst in Austria Stoke played a match against local part-time side SV Thal. Stoke won with three goals in the second half through Michael Tonge, Jonathan Walters and a very rare goal from Andy Wilkinson; Thal scored a consolation via Erik Bischtand. Upon their return to England, Stoke travelled to Tony Pulis's home town of Newport for two matches against his former clubs. The first match saw City draw 1–1 with Newport County, County scored through their captain Gary Warren before Kenwyne Jones equalised after 75 minutes, he had the ball in the back of the net later on but it was ruled out for offside. The following day Stoke fielded a different team for the match against Newport YMCA. Goals from Ben Marshall, Diego Arismendi, Matthew Lund and Rory Delap gave Stoke an easy 6–1 victory. After the trip to South Wales Pulis said he 'enjoyed his return home'.

Stoke then scored another six against Newcastle Town in what was the 30th meeting between the two clubs. Stoke's goals came from Australian trialist Robert Stambolziev, Jermaine Pennant, Glenn Whelan Jonathan Walters, and a brace from Kenwyne Jones. City then suffered two poor results losing 1–0 to both Brentford and Aldershot. City ended their pre-season schedule with a 0–0 draw against Sheffield Wednesday.

Match	Date	Opponent	Venue	Result	Attendance	Scorers	Report
1	14 July 2011	SV Thal	A	3–1	250	Tonge 58', Walters 74', Wilkinson 86'	Report
2	16 July 2011	Newport County	A	1–1	2,120	Jones 75'	Report
3	17 July 2011	Newport YMCA	A	6–1	200	Marshall (2) 19', 30', Lund 41', Arismendi (2) 65', 80', Delap 87'	Report
4	20 July 2011	Newcastle Town	A	6–0	3,146	Stambolziev 35', Jones (2) 47', 51', Pennant 54', Whelan 57', Walters 81'	Report
5	22 July 2011	Brentford	A	0–1	2,946		Report
6	23 July 2011	Aldershot Town	A	0–1	1,684		Report
7	30 July 2011	Sheffield Wednesday	A	0–0	3,959		Report

== Premier League ==
=== August ===
For the season opener against Chelsea manager Tony Pulis gave a league debut to Jonathan Woodgate with Robert Huth moving to right-back. For Chelsea they had new manager André Villas-Boas in charge for his first Premier League match. After an even first half, Chelsea were the better side after the break with Asmir Begović making a number of important saves. After injuries to Matthew Etherington and Rory Delap, City went defensive and were able to claim a goalless draw.

After the Europa League match against Thun in Switzerland, Stoke travelled to Norfolk to take on newly promoted Norwich City. Stoke started the match the better side but suffered a huge blow when Jermaine Pennant was forced off due to injury after half an hour. Norwich took the lead through former Stoke reserve team player Ritchie De Laet as "The Canaries" went into the break in the lead. After half-time, Stoke were awarded a penalty when Leon Barnett fouled Jonathan Walters, however Norwich goalkeeper John Ruddy saved Walters' effort. Stoke were able to get a result though as Kenwyne Jones headed in Whelan's cross in the 94th minute to deny Norwich the win.

Stoke's final match of August was against Midlands rivals West Bromwich Albion at The Hawthorns. It turned to be a poor match with both teams struggleling to create clear goal scoring chances. With the match seemingly destined for a goalless draw, "Baggies" keeper Ben Foster hesitated when under pressure from Ryan Shotton, who was able to claim the ball and roll it into an empty net.

=== September ===
Stoke's new record signing Peter Crouch made his debut against his old club Liverpool following the international break. City scored the only goal of the match after 20 minutes when Jamie Carragher brought down Walters in the penalty area, who fired the ball past Pepe Reina. Liverpool produced a dominant second half performance with Luis Suárez being a large threat to the Stoke defence. Stoke had to defend well to keep their 1–0 lead intact and due to some last ditch defending were able to come away with the three points.

After a 1–1 in Kyiv, "The Potters"' nine-match unbeaten run was then ended in emphatic style by Sunderland on Wearside as Steve Bruce's side scored four goals without reply. Sunderland scored through Titus Bramble following a mistake from Begović, an own goal from Woodgate, a deflected shot from Craig Gardner and a free-kick from Sebastian Larsson.

Manchester United arrived at the Britannia with a 100% winning start but had Wayne Rooney missing out due to injury. They suffered another injury early into the match when Javier Hernández was substituted after colliding with Begovic and Woodgate. They went into the lead through a low shot from Nani after 26 minutes. Stoke almost equalised soon after through Wilkinson, but David de Gea palmed his shot on to the post. Stoke's equaliser came after just half time with Peter Crouch scoring his first goal for "The Potters" since his move from Tottenham. Stoke had chances to win the match but De Gea made a number of fine saves. The final chance of the game fell to Ryan Giggs, but he could only volley wide of the goal. It was the first time Stoke had gained a result against Manchester United in the Premier League.

=== October ===
Stoke made their first journey to Swansea City's Liberty Stadium following the Europa League win over Beşiktaş. It proved to be a very poor afternoon for "The Potters", however, as two defensive errors allowed "The Jacks" score to twice through Scott Sinclair and Danny Graham.

Following the international break Stoke returned to Premier League football with the visit of Martin Jol's Fulham side. In what was a quite first half, Stoke had two good chances to take the lead with Crouch and Pennant both guilty of poor finishing. In the second half, Stoke were the dominant side but were finding it difficult to break down a stubborn "Cottagers" defence. The breakthrough came after 80 minutes when Jon Walters tapped in Matthew Etherington's wayward shot, moments earlier John Arne Riise's hit a powerful free-kick that hit the Stoke crossbar. Three minutes from full-time Rory Delap scored a rare goal to seal a 2–0 win.

City's next game came at Arsenal on 23 October at the Emirates Stadium. After a quite opening half hour Gervinho broke the offside trap and put the ball past Begović. Stoke, however, were not behind for long as a well worked free kick was finished off by Crouch from all of two yards. Any hopes Stoke had of claiming their first points at the Emirates were ended in the second half by substitute Robin van Persie, who scored twice.

On Halloween, Stoke faced inform Newcastle United at the Britannia. It turned out to be a defensive "horror show" for City as former transfer target Demba Ba scored a hat-trick as both Shawcross and Wilson departed due to injury. Manager Pulis blamed his defence for conceding 'sloppy goals'.

=== November ===
Stoke ended a busy period with a woeful defeat against Bolton Wanderers who reversed the scoreline from last season's FA Cup semi-final. Pulis branded his players performance as the worst since he returned to the club in 2006.

Following the two-week international break, Stoke had the opportunity to make amends for the Bolton defeat against newly promoted Queens Park Rangers. More poor defending, however, cost Stoke as goals from Luke Young and a brace from Heiðar Helguson earned Neil Warnock's team the points. Goals from Walters and Shawcross proved to be in vain for City as they fell to a fourth-straight league defeat.

Stoke ended their losing run with victory over struggling Blackburn Rovers at the Britannia. After a cagey opening to the match, Delap headed in a Pennant free-kick to put City in front. Rovers almost levelled soon after the break when Rubén Rochina weaved his way through the penalty area, though only to see his cross totally missed by Mauro Formica. Two goals from Whelan and Crouch put Stoke in a comfortable position with Rochina replying for Rovers.

=== December ===
After securing European qualification against Dynamo Kyiv, Stoke travelled to an emotional Goodison Park where the Everton fans were mourning the recent death of Gary Speed. Stoke produced a more familiar defensive performance than what was on show in November and came away with a rare away win thanks to Robert Huth's first goal of the season. There was one concern for Stoke, however, as goalkeeper Thomas Sørensen had to be stretchered off with concussion.

In-form Tottenham travelled to the Britannia having gone 11 matches unbeaten. Stoke started with great pressure on the Spurs defence with Ryan Shotton's long throw-ins causing problems, and they led to both Stoke goals scored by Matthew Etherington to put City 2–0 in front at half time. Tottenham improved in the second half and pulled a goal back from the penalty spot, but Younès Kaboul was sent off and Stoke were able to claim the three points.

Stoke began the festive period with a short trip to Wolverhampton and received some early good fortune from referee Anthony Taylor. With Woodgate playing at right back, he came up against Matt Jarvis and was booked for a late challenge early into the match. Woodgate continued to have problems with Jarvis and he gave away a penalty after 17 minutes, however Taylor decided not to send him off, much to the fury of Mick McCarthy. Hunt scored from the spot and Pulis substituted Woodgate and brought on Pennant and Stoke began to take control of the play. In the second half, a Huth free-kick was deflected into the goal by Kevin Doyle, while Peter Crouch scored the winning goal for Stoke in a 2–1 win, marking the first time that Stoke had won four Premier League matches in a row.

Stoke's winning run came to an end in their next match away at league leaders Manchester City in what was difficult evening for the "Potters". Under constant pressure from the start of the match, Man City controlled the match and easily won 3–0 with a brace from Sergio Agüero and a trademark long-range effort from Adam Johnson. Stoke had a tough time and failed to trouble an underworked Joe Hart.

The Boxing Day match against Aston Villa was played at an untraditional time of 7:45pm to accommodate live TV coverage. The match though was a bland and uneventful affair and finished unsurprisingly in a goalless draw. Marc Wilson had the best chance of the match as his header struck the crossbar late in the second half.

Stoke finished a successful 2011 with a 2–2 against Wigan Athletic. The "Latics" took the lead through Victor Moses just before half time following a well worked move. Stoke tried in vain to pull level until the 77th minute when Gary Caldwell handled on the line and was sent off. Walters calmly beat Ali Al-Habsi from the spot and soon after Cameron Jerome scored his first league goal for Stoke. Stoke, however, were denied a comeback with just moments after the Wigan restart they were awarded a penalty after Shotton had pulled Hugo Rodallega's shirt. Ben Watson came off the bench to take the penalty and sent Sørensen the wrong way.

=== January ===
The first match of 2012 saw Stoke travel to struggling Blackburn, who surprisingly beat Manchester United in their previous match and Rovers started the match well with Christopher Samba hitting the crossbar and having a goal ruled out for a foul on Sørensen. Stoke then began to take control of the contest and took the lead through Peter Crouch after 17 minutes, Crouch's 100th league goal. He scored again just before half-time after good wing play by Matthew Etherington. Rovers pulled a goal back through David Goodwillie with 20 minutes left, but Stoke were able to see out the rest of the match with relative ease to claim a 2–1 victory.

Stoke continued their improved away form by drawing 0–0 at Liverpool. Stoke put in a fine defensive performance and whilst they never threatened to win the match they were equally looked unlikely to lose as Liverpool struggled to break down a hard working Stoke defence.

Stoke's first home match of 2012 was against West Brom at a windy Britannia Stadium, and the Baggies took full advantage of the conditions with James Morrison taking long-range shots. He hit the crossbar with one before scoring after a huge swerve deceived Sørensen, where the ball bounced under his body to give West Brom the lead. Stoke struggled to get back into the match but were given a penalty when Gabriel Tamaș fouled Walters; his penalty, however, was easily saved by Ben Foster. Cameron Jerome came off the bench and scored with a glancing header, but West Brom secured a deserved win in the final minute via a Graham Dorrans free-kick.

On 31 January, Stoke took on Manchester United at Old Trafford and were undone by two penalties either side of half time, Pennant tripping Park Ji-sung for the first and Walters pulling Antonio Valencia's arm. After the match, Pulis expressed his disappointment at the referee's decisions.

=== February ===
Stoke began a potentially season defining February with a second consecutive home defeat, this time to an in-form Sunderland. The match was played in falling snow which progressively got worse, meaning that there was few goalscoring chances for both sides. The match took a huge change just before half-time when Huth was sent-off for tackling David Meyler, although replays showed that Huth pulled out of the challenge. Sunderland took full advantage of the extra man and scored the only goal through James McClean. Stoke did attempt to get Huth's red card overturned, but failed in their efforts.

Stoke then recorded their fourth-straight Premier League defeat – for the second time this season – with a 2–1 defeat at Fulham. Stoke conceded twice in the opening half hour with Fulham's new Russian striker Pavel Pogrebnyak and an own goal from Sørensen putting Martin Jol's team in a good position. City pulled one back in the second half through Ryan Shawcross, but were unable to claim a draw.

With one win in eight matches and now eliminated from the Europa League, a win against Swansea was vital for Stoke. After not really doing much in the match, Matthew Upson broke the deadlock with a header from Matthew Etherington's corner in the 24th minute and then Crouch flicked home his tenth goal of the season when he rose to meet a long throw-in from Ryan Shotton six minutes before the break. Swansea kept the ball well but failed to trouble an under worked Asmir Begović, and Stoke were able to see out a fairly comfortably 2–0 victory.

=== March ===
Stoke faced another newly promoted team in the form of Norwich at the Britannia Stadium. The match coincided with the 40th anniversary of Stoke's 1972 League Cup win and ironically, it was in the 72nd minute that Stoke scored the only goal of the match through Matthew Etherington, who beat goalkeeper John Ruddy from a tight angle in what was rare moment of quality in a match with few chances.

After two home wins, Stoke were narrowly beaten 1–0 at Chelsea, with Didier Drogba scoring the only goal of the match after 68 minutes. This was after Stoke had played most of the match with ten men as Ricardo Fuller – making his first start of the season – was sent off early on after he stamped on Branislav Ivanović. Pulis described Fuller's actions as "ridiculous".

On 21 March, Stoke travelled to a muted White Hart Lane which saw the Bolton midfielder Fabrice Muamba collapse on the pitch three days before. Stoke were knocked out of the FA Cup by Liverpool and were now able to concentrate on the Premier League for the rest of the season. After containing Tottenham for most of the match, Stoke took the lead through Cameron Jerome on 75 minutes following a goalmouth scramble. Stoke, however, were denied an impressive win in the final moments as Rafael van der Vaart headed in a Gareth Bale cross.

Stoke's next home match saw title challengers Manchester City arrived at the Britannia Stadium and saw a contender for goal of the season scored by Peter Crouch. After a goalless first half, Stoke opened the scoring in memorable style: a long goal-kick from Begović was headed by Crouch on to Pennant, who passed back to the forward, who then took a touch and fired a volley shot past goalkeeper Joe Hart. Stoke could not hold on, however, as a long-range Yaya Touré strike earned the visitors a share of the points.

City, now in good spirits following Peter Crouch's wonder goal the previous week, travelled to Wigan for the final match of March. The first half was a very competitive one which produced some hard tackles and few goalscoring chances. In second half, however, Wigan were by far the better side and easily won the match 2–0 thanks to goals from Antolín Alcaraz and Victor Moses.

=== April ===
Wolves were Stoke's first opponents over the Easter period, who arrived in Stoke needing a win to give them any hope of avoiding the drop. Wolves took the lead in the 27th minute in rather bizarre fashion against the run of play, Michael Kightly embarked upon a run from wide on the right and when he chipped the ball into the onrushing Dave Edwards, but the Welsh international midfielder's attempt to get a touch deceived Asmir Begović as it bounced past him into the net. The lead lasted just seven minutes, however, as Huth hit a powerful shot past Wayne Hennessey. Stoke all but ended Wolves' stay in the Premier League as Crouch scored the final goal of the match to secure Stoke a league double over their Midlands rivals.

Forty-eight hours later, Stoke again faced struggling Midlands opponents in the form of Aston Villa in what was another poor quality match between the two sides. After very little excitement, Andreas Weimann curled in a fine goal to give the hosts the lead. Stoke were trying in vain to draw level, so Pulis introduced the rested pair of Crouch and Pennant; the move paid off as a Pennant set piece was headed into the net by Huth to earn City a share of the points.

After a two-week break due to Everton being involved in the FA Cup semi-final, Stoke made the long trip north to Newcastle United where they came away with a heavy 3–0 loss. Yohan Cabaye proved to be Stoke's chief tormentor as he scored twice and assisted Papiss Cissé.

Arsenal were Stoke's next opponents at the Britannia Stadium and Peter Crouch scored the opening goal after just ten minutes, but Robin van Persie quickly equalised for the "Gunners". Both sides had opportunities of grabbing all three points during a frantic second 45 minutes, with Crouch and Jonathan Walters both going closest in stoppage time but the match ended on level terms.

=== May ===
The re-arranged match with Everton produced a dour encounter with few moments of excitement. Everton had the better of an awful first half and they scored on the stroke of half-time as Peter Crouch scored an unlucky own goal. The introduction of Ricardo Fuller and Cameron Jerome gave Stoke some life and within seconds of his arrival Jerome used his pace to accelerate through the "Toffees" defence and rescue a point for Stoke.

The final two matches of the 2011–12 season saw Stoke involved in the fight to avoid relegation with both their opponents Queens Park Rangers and Bolton in danger of joining Blackburn and Wolves in The Football League. The match against QPR saw Stoke squander an early effort as Cameron Jerome missed an easy chance. With the match seemingly heading for a goalless draw, Djibril Cissé scored in the final few moments to spark a pitch invasion by jubilant "Rs" fans.

For the final match of a long and difficult season for Stoke, their opponents Bolton arrived in Stoke-on-Trent knowing that they had to win to remain a Premier League club, while Stoke fans dedicated the match to Ricardo Fuller, who would be out of contract at season's end. Jonathan Walters scored a controversial opening goal for Stoke as he barged into goalkeeper Ádám Bogdán, who had both hands on the ball and dropped the ball behind the line. Bolton, however, went close with Kevin Davies hitting the crossbar before Bolton had a stroke of luck they needed. First, an attempted clearance from Robert Huth cannoned off Mark Davies and then an attempted cross from Kevin Davies deceived Thomas Sørensen to give Bolton a shock 2–1 lead. Unfortunately for "Trotters" fans, a second-half penalty from Walters condemned them to the Championship. Stoke ended the season in 14th place with 45 points, but a lack of goals and attacking play made it a disappointing and often boring Premier League season for the Stoke supporters.

=== Results ===
Match	Date	Opponent	Venue	Result	Attendance	Scorers	Report
1	14 August 2011	Chelsea	H	0–0	27,421		Report
2	21 August 2011	Norwich City	A	1–1	26,272	Jones 90+4'	Report
3	28 August 2011	West Bromwich Albion	A	1–0	22,909	Shotton 89'	Report
4	10 September 2011	Liverpool	H	1–0	27,592	Walters 21' (pen)	Report
5	18 September 2011	Sunderland	A	0–4	32,296		Report
6	24 September 2011	Manchester United	H	1–1	27,582	Crouch 52'	Report
7	2 October 2011	Swansea City	A	0–2	19,523		Report
8	15 October 2011	Fulham	H	2–0	26,890	Walters 80', Delap 87'	Report
9	23 October 2011	Arsenal	A	1–3	59,671	Crouch 34'	Report
10	31 October 2011	Newcastle United	H	1–3	26,564	Walters 75' (pen)	Report
11	6 November 2011	Bolton Wanderers	A	0–5	20,028		Report
12	19 November 2011	Queens Park Rangers	H	2–3	27,618	Walters 8', Shawcross 64'	Report
13	26 November 2011	Blackburn Rovers	H	3–1	26,686	Delap 28', Whelan 58', Crouch 72'	Report
14	4 December 2011	Everton	A	1–0	33,219	Huth 15'	Report
15	11 December 2011	Tottenham Hotspur	H	2–1	27,529	Etherington (2) 13', 43'	Report
16	17 December 2011	Wolverhampton Wanderers	A	2–1	24,694	Doyle 58' (o.g.), Crouch 70'	Report
17	21 December 2011	Manchester City	A	0–3	46,321		Report
18	26 December 2011	Aston Villa	H	0–0	27,739		Report
19	31 December 2011	Wigan Athletic	H	2–2	26,595	Walters 77' (pen), Jerome 84'	Report
20	2 January 2012	Blackburn Rovers	A	2–1	20,615	Crouch (2) 17', 45'	Report
21	14 January 2012	Liverpool	A	0–0	44,691		Report
22	21 January 2012	West Bromwich Albion	H	1–2	26,865	Jerome 86'	Report
23	31 January 2012	Manchester United	A	0–2	74,719		Report
24	4 February 2012	Sunderland	H	0–1	27,717		Report
25	11 February 2012	Fulham	A	1–2	23,555	Shawcross 78'	Report
26	26 February 2012	Swansea City	H	2–0	26,768	Upson 24', Crouch 39'	Report
27	3 March 2012	Norwich City	H	1–0	27,483	Etherington 72'	Report
28	10 March 2012	Chelsea	A	0–1	40,945		Report
29	21 March 2012	Tottenham Hotspur	A	1–1	35,172	Jerome 75'	Report
30	24 March 2012	Manchester City	H	1–1	27,535	Crouch 59'	Report
31	31 March 2012	Wigan Athletic	A	0–2	19,786		Report
32	7 April 2012	Wolverhampton Wanderers	H	2–1	27,005	Huth 37', Crouch 61'	Report
33	9 April 2012	Aston Villa	A	1–1	30,100	Huth 71'	Report
34	21 April 2012	Newcastle United	A	0–3	52,162		Report
35	28 April 2012	Arsenal	H	1–1	27,502	Crouch 9'	Report
36	1 May 2012	Everton	H	1–1	26,500	Jerome 68'	Report
37	5 May 2012	Queens Park Rangers	A	0–1	17,319		Report
38	13 May 2012	Bolton Wanderers	H	2–2	27,789	Walters (2) 13', 77' (pen)	Report

=== Final league table ===
Pos	Team	Pld	W	D	L	GF	GA	GD	Pts
12	Norwich City	38	12	11	15	52	66	−14	47
13	Sunderland	38	11	12	15	45	46	−1	45
14	Stoke City	38	11	12	15	36	53	−17	45
15	Wigan Athletic	38	11	10	17	42	62	−20	43
16	Aston Villa	38	7	17	14	37	53	−16	38

Source: Barclays Premier League
Rules for classification: 1) points; 2) goal difference; 3) number of goals scored.

== FA Cup ==
As last season's runners-up, Stoke were drawn away against one of manager Tony Pulis' old teams: League Two side Gillingham.

Stoke survived after an early scare from the Gills who started brightly and took the lead through Danny Kedwell. Stoke made sure that there was no upset and thanks to goals from Jonathan Walters, Cameron Jerome and Robert Huth.

Over 5,500 Stoke made the short journey across the A50 to see Stoke take on Derby County. Stoke made a perfect start scoring after five minutes through Jerome. Huth hit the post with a header before Derby began to cause City problems with Jamie Ward being a difficult opponent. Stoke controlled the second half and ended the contest with ten minutes left as a Pennant corner fell for Huth to fire a close range shot under the body of Frank Fielding.

In the fifth round Stoke were handed a tricky tie at League Two high-fliers Crawley Town in what was the first meeting between the clubs. Danny Collins made a surprise start after failing to move away from the club in January and it was Crawley who made the bright start putting City's defence under pressure which led to Peter Crouch heading against his own bar. The match took a turn in the 17th minute when Rory Delap was sent-off for a tackle on David Hunt. This seemed to spring Stoke into life and they were awarded a soft looking penalty just before half-time which Walters put past Rene Gilmartin. Stoke scored a second goal just after the half time break through a Crouch header. The Red Devils tried in vain to get back into the tie and Stoke booked their place in the quarter final for the third season in a row.

Stoke met Liverpool for the fourth time this season and just like in the League Cup it was the Anfield club who narrowly came away with a 2–1 victory. Luis Suárez scored the first goal against the run of play but Peter Crouch quickly equalised. Stewart Downing scored the decisive second goal to send Liverpool through.

Round	Date	Opponent	Venue	Result	Attendance	Scorers	Report
R3	7 January 2012	Gillingham	A	3–1	9,872	Walters 34', Jerome 43', Huth 49'	Report
R4	28 January 2012	Derby County	A	2–0	22,247	Jerome 5', Huth 81'	Report
R5	19 February 2012	Crawley Town	A	2–0	4,214	Walters 42' (pen), Crouch 52'	Report
Quarter final	18 March 2012	Liverpool	A	1–2	43,962	Crouch 26'	Report

== League Cup ==
Stoke entered the League Cup at the third round stage as they received a bye from the second round due to their involvement in the Europa League. Stoke were drawn at home to Tottenham Hotspur in what was the first meeting between the two clubs in the League Cup. The match was a dull uneventful affair and after 90 minutes plus extra time the tie went to a penalty shootout. After Shotton had made it 7–6 to Stoke, Tottenham's young Australian debutant Massimo Luongo kick was saved by Sørensen to end the contest.

In the fourth round, Stoke faced Liverpool at home and took the lead through Kenwyne Jones just before half time. Two second half goals from Luis Suárez, however, sent the Merseyside club through to the quarter-final.

Round	Date	Opponent	Venue	Result	Attendance	Scorers	Report
R3	20 September 2011	Tottenham Hotspur	H	0–0 (7–6 pens)	15,023		Report
R4	26 October 2011	Liverpool	H	1–2	24,939	Jones 44'	Report

== UEFA Europa League ==
By reaching the FA Cup Final last season, Stoke qualified for the UEFA Europa League, after Manchester City confirmed a place in the UEFA Champions League. Stoke entered at the third qualifying round as cup runners-up where they were drawn against Croatian side Hajduk Split.

There was great anticipation ahead of Stoke's first European match since 1974 and Stoke made a perfect start, scoring the first goal after just three minutes via Jonathan Walters. Stoke, however, were left frustrated in their attempts to extend their lead, meaning that City took a narrow lead to Split for the second leg.

In Croatia, over 28,000 Hajduk fans created a unique atmosphere for the second leg, as Jonathan Woodgate made his debut in place of Andy Wilkinson who missed out due to injury. Stoke were content to allow Hajduk have possession and were able to keep the hosts from troubling Asmir Begović. Stoke sealed their place in the play-off round in the second half injury time when Ryan Shotton bundled the ball past goalkeeper Danijel Subašić. The result also meant that Stoke had won their first ever European round after two previous failed attempts back in the 1970s.

Stoke were drawn against Swiss side FC Thun in the final qualifying round. Thun caused a shock result in the previous round as they defeated the much fancied Italian side Palermo. The first leg in Thun was played on an artificial pitch much to the annoyance of Tony Pulis. Matthew Upson made his debut for Stoke as Danny Pugh scored the only goal of the match after nineteen minutes. It got worse for Thun as their goalkeeper, David Da Costa, was sent-off in the final few moments of the match.

The second leg proved to a very one sided affair with Stoke scoring three times in the opening first 40 minutes through Matthew Upson, Kenwyne Jones and Glenn Whelan. Jones scored a fourth for City in the second half as Stoke claimed an historic group stage place. The Swiss scored a consolation through Andreas Wittwer.

In the group stage, Stoke were drawn against Beşiktaş, Dynamo Kyiv and Maccabi Tel Aviv meaning that Stoke will have to travel a total of 11,000 miles for their away matches.

Stoke's first ever group stage match saw them travel to Ukrainian giants Dynamo Kyiv. Pulis made eight changes from the side that beat Liverpool with Cameron Jerome handed his debut. The hosts had famous striker Andriy Shevchenko in their team and it was he who caused City's defence most problems with his movement and skill. After a goalless first half, Stoke took the lead with their first shot on target through Jerome. City then had to withstand heavy pressure from Dynamo with Oleksandr Aliyev and Brown Ideye going close to equalising. Stoke, however, were denied a famous victory right at the end when Ognjen Vukojević tapped in from close range.

Stoke's first home match in the group stage was against Turkish cup winners Beşiktaş in what was a historic night at the Britannia Stadium. The Black Eagles took the lead through Roberto Hilbert after he was played in by the dangerous Ricardo Quaresma. Stoke, however, hit back instantly with Peter Crouch scoring his second goal in as many matches. City dominated the second half with Beşiktaş sitting back and trying to mount counterattacks via Quaresma. In the 78th minute, Stoke were awarded a penalty when Crouch was fouled by Tomáš Sivok, and Jonathan Walters smashed his spot kick past goalkeeper Rüştü Reçber to move Stoke to the top of the group.

Israeli side Maccabi Tel Aviv arrived in Stoke-on-Trent bottom of the group and after 12 minutes Jones powered his header past Guy Haimov. Jerome added a second ten minutes later before setting up Shotton to make it 3–0 to Stoke. Jerome had an eventful first half and after being show a yellow card for dissent he received a second for an apparent elbow on left back Yoav Ziv. In the second half, Ziv himself was sent off in bizarre circumstances: after being unhappy with not being awarded a free-kick, he kicked his displaced boot at the linesman and, after a short consultation between the officials, was sent off.

Stoke next match saw them travel to Tel Aviv for the return fixture against Maccabi. Danny Higginbotham made his first appearance since March after returning from injury. The Potters won the match 2–1 with goals from Dean Whitehead and Peter Crouch while Roberto Colautti scored for the home side. The result left Stoke requiring a point to qualify. Pulis admitted that his side was rarely troubled by a lesser opponent.

Stoke got the point they needed in the next match against Dynamo on 1 December, however it looked very unlikely as the Ukrainian giants produced a commanding first-half display, frustrating Stoke with their slow style and they took the lead when Oleksandr Aliyev's shot deflected in off Matthew Upson. Dynamo almost doubled their lead through Shevchenko, but his shot hit the post. Stoke improved in the second half and pulled level ten minutes from full-time via a powerful header from Jones to claim an historic place in the knock-out stage. Pulis described the achievement as a "milestone" in the club's history.

The final match of the group stage saw Stoke take a second string side to the noisy BJK İnönü Stadium. Stoke took the lead via Ricardo Fuller after 30 minutes, however the game changed when Matthew Upson fouled Hugo Almeida to concede a penalty kick was sent off. Manuel Fernandes scored the penalty and Beşiktaş went on to win 3–1 to claim top spot in the group and end Stoke's unbeaten European run. There were a few incidents in the match were Stoke's players were pelted with objects from the crowd; Pulis later said that the club will not complain to UEFA.

Stoke were handed a glamour tie against Spanish giants Valencia in the round of 32; following the draw, Pulis stated that he is relishing the prospect of taking on one of Europe's top clubs.

Valencia arrived in Stoke-on-Trent third in La Liga and went into the tie as clear favourites. Stoke almost opened the scoring very early on but Walters dragged his shot wide of Vicente Guaita goal. Los Che slowly started to control the match and took the lead through a fine long-range effort from Mehmet Topal. The Spaniards quick movement and skill continued to cause Stoke problems, with Brazilian international Jonas proving a difficult opponent. Stoke tried hard to pull level in the second half, but it was Valencia who almost scored again as Sofiane Feghouli hit the post.

For the second leg in Valencia, Stoke took a largely reserve side and named just four substitutes which included academy captain Lucas Dawson. This attracted much criticism of Pulis by supporters but he defended his choice. Around 5,000 City fans were in the Mestalla Stadium to see Stoke take on one of Europe's top clubs. Kenwyne Jones had two brilliant chances early on and Stoke would rue those missed chances as Valencia scored the only goal of the match through Jonas. Stoke lost 2–0 on aggregate and exited the Europa League.

=== Third qualifying round ===
28 July 2011 1st leg	Stoke City (England)	1–0	Hajduk Split (Croatia)	Stoke-on-Trent
	Walters 3'; Huth (yellow card) 82'	Report		Stadium: Britannia Stadium; Attendance: 26,322; Referee: Babak Rafati (Germany)

4 August 2011 2nd leg	Hajduk Split (Croatia)	0–1	Stoke City (England)	Split, Croatia
	Miličević (yellow card) 29'; Andrić (yellow card) 37'; Sarić (yellow card) 89'	Report	Begović (yellow card) 61'; Whitehead (yellow card) 63'; Pennant (yellow card) 81'; Etherington (yellow card) 90'; Milicevic 90+3' (o.g.)	Stadium: Stadion Poljud; Attendance: 29,548; Referee: Andrea De Marco (Italy)

Stoke City won 2–0 on aggregate.

=== Play-off round ===
18 August 2011 1st leg	Thun (Switzerland)	0–1	Stoke City (England)	Thun, Switzerland
	Bättig (yellow card) 33'; Da Costa (red card) 90'	Report	Pugh 19'; Huth (yellow card) 21'; Tonge (yellow card) 31'; Etherington (yellow card) 46'; Walters (yellow card) 90+5'	Stadium: Arena Thun; Attendance: 7,850; Referee: Daniel Stålhammar (Sweden)

25 August 2011 2nd leg	Stoke City (England)	4–1	Thun (Switzerland)	Stoke-on-Trent
	Upson 24'; Jones 30', 71'; Whelan 37'; Whitehead (yellow card) 38'	Report	Lüthi (yellow card) 36'; Wittwer 77'	Stadium: Britannia Stadium; Attendance: 24,148; Referee: Marcin Borski (Poland)

Stoke City won 5–1 on aggregate.

=== Group stage ===
15 September 2011 Match 1	Dynamo Kyiv (Ukraine)	1–1	Stoke City (England)	Kyiv, Ukraine
	Harmash (yellow card) 44'; Milevskyi (yellow card) 48'; Popov (yellow card) 56'; Haruna (yellow card) 65'; Vukojević 90'	Report	Diao (yellow card) 15'; Shawcross (yellow card) 39'; Upson (yellow card) 42'; Huth (yellow card) 44'; Jerome 55'	Stadium: Lobanovskyi Dynamo Stadium; Attendance: 14,500; Referee: Ovidiu Hațegan (Romania)

29 September 2011 Match 2	Stoke City (England)	2–1	Beşiktaş (Turkey)	Stoke-on-Trent
	Crouch 15'; Upson (yellow card) 42'; Walters 78' (pen.); Whelan (yellow card) 82'	Report	Hilbert 14'; Sivok (yellow card) 78'	Stadium: Britannia Stadium; Attendance: 23,551; Referee: Antony Gautier (France)

20 October 2011 Match 3	Stoke City (England)	3–0	Maccabi Tel Aviv (Israel)	Stoke-on-Trent
	Jones 12'; Jerome 24', (yellow card) 33' (yellow-red card) 42'; Shotton 31'; Huth (yellow card) 68'	Report	Ziv (red card) 54'; Micha (yellow card) 77'; Colautti (yellow card) 77'	Stadium: Britannia Stadium; Attendance: 22,759; Referee: Anastassios Kakos (Greece)

3 November 2011 Match 4	Maccabi Tel Aviv (Israel)	1–2	Stoke City (England)	Tel Aviv, Israel
	Cohen (yellow card) 12'; Punčec (yellow card) 32'; Colautti 90'	Report	Jones (yellow card) 35'; Whitehead 51'; Crouch 64'; Sørensen (yellow card) 90+3'	Stadium: Bloomfield Stadium; Attendance: 10,368; Referee: Duarte Gomes (Portugal)

1 December 2011 Match 5	Stoke City (England)	1–1	Dynamo Kyiv (Ukraine)	Stoke-on-Trent
	Huth (yellow card) 76'; Jones 80'	Report	Yarmolenko (yellow card) 7'; Upson 27' (o.g.); Khacheridi (yellow card) 84'	Stadium: Britannia Stadium; Attendance: 23,774; Referee: Florian Meyer (Germany)

14 December 2011 Match 6	Beşiktaş (Turkey)	3–1	Stoke City (England)	Istanbul, Turkey
	Fernandes 58' (pen.); Hilbert (yellow card) 61'; Pektemek 74'; Edu 82', (yellow card) 90+2'	Report	Fuller (yellow card) 26', (goal) 29'; Begović (yellow card) 43'; Upson (red card) 57'	Stadium: BJK İnönü Stadium; Attendance: 29,000; Referee: Marcin Borski (Poland)

Pos	Team	Pld	W	D	L	GF	GA	GD	Pts	Qualification
1	(Turkey) Beşiktaş	6	4	0	2	13	7	+6	12	Advance to knockout phase
2	(England) Stoke City	6	3	2	1	10	7	+3	11	Advance to knockout phase
3	(Ukraine) Dynamo Kyiv	6	1	4	1	7	7	0	7	
4	(Israel) Maccabi Tel Aviv	6	0	2	4	8	17	−9	2	

Source: Soccerway

=== Round of 32 ===
16 February 2012 1st leg	Stoke City (England)	0–1	Valencia (Spain)	Stoke-on-Trent
	Shawcross (yellow card) 54'; Etherington (yellow card) 83'; Walters (yellow card) 84'; Whitehead (yellow card) 85'; Wilkinson (yellow card) 90+3'	Report	Topal 36'; Rami (yellow card) 73'; T. Costa (yellow card) 85'	Stadium: Britannia Stadium; Attendance: 24,185; Referee: Peter Rasmussen (Denmark)

23 February 2012 2nd leg	Valencia (Spain)	1–0	Stoke City (England)	Valencia, Spain
	Jonas 24'; Dealbert (yellow card) 77'; Soldado (yellow card) 89'	Report	Diao (yellow card) 30'; Huth (yellow card) 68'; Pennant (yellow card) 73'; Jones (yellow card) 77'; Shotton (yellow card) 81'	Stadium: Estadio Mestalla; Attendance: 35,000; Referee: Markus Strömbergsson (Sweden)

Stoke City lost 2–0 on aggregate.

== Squad statistics ==
No.	Pos.	Name	Premier League		FA Cup		League Cup		UEFA Europa League		Total		Discipline	
No.	Pos.	Name	Apps	Goals	Apps	Goals	Apps	Goals	Apps	Goals	Apps	Goals	Yellow card	Red card
1	GK	(Bosnia and Herzegovina) Asmir Begović	22(1)	0	3	0	0	0	5	0	30(1)	0	2	0
3	DF	(England) Danny Higginbotham	1(1)	0	0	0	0	0	3	0	4(1)	0	0	0
4	DF	(Germany) Robert Huth	31(3)	3	3	2	2	0	10	0	46(3)	5	15	1
5	DF	(Wales) Danny Collins	0	0	1	0	0	0	1(1)	0	2(1)	0	0	0
6	MF	(Republic of Ireland) Glenn Whelan	27(3)	1	3(1)	0	2	0	4(3)	1	37(6)	2	7	0
8	MF	(England) Tom Soares	0	0	0	0	0	0	0(1)	0	0(1)	0	0	0
9	FW	(Trinidad and Tobago) Kenwyne Jones	10(11)	1	1(1)	0	2	1	10	4	23(12)	6	2	0
10	FW	(Jamaica) Ricardo Fuller	3(10)	0	0(2)	0	0	0	2(1)	1	5(13)	1	3	1
11	FW	(Mali) Mamady Sidibé	0	0	0	0	0	0	0	0	0	0	0	0
12	DF	(Republic of Ireland) Marc Wilson	35	0	2	0	2	0	6	0	45	0	9	0
14	MF	(England) Danny Pugh	0(3)	0	0	0	0	0	2(1)	1	2(4)	1	0	0
15	MF	(Senegal) Salif Diao	2(4)	0	0	0	0(1)	0	6(1)	0	8(6)	0	3	0
16	MF	(England) Jermaine Pennant	18(9)	0	0(2)	0	1(1)	0	5(4)	0	24(16)	0	4	0
17	DF	(England) Ryan Shawcross (c)	36	2	4	0	1	0	8	0	49	2	12	0
18	MF	(England) Dean Whitehead	24(9)	0	3(1)	0	0	0	6(4)	1	33(14)	1	9	0
19	FW	(Republic of Ireland) Jonathan Walters	38	7	4	2	1(1)	0	6(4)	2	49(5)	11	5	0
20	DF	(England) Matthew Upson	10(4)	1	2	0	1	0	8	1	21(4)	2	3	1
21	DF	(England) Andrew Davies	0	0	0	0	0	0	0	0	0	0	0	0
23	MF	(England) Michael Tonge	0	0	0	0	0	0	1	0	1	0	1	0
24	MF	(Republic of Ireland) Rory Delap	18(8)	2	2(1)	0	1	0	6	0	27(9)	2	5	1
25	FW	(England) Peter Crouch	31(1)	10	3	2	0(2)	0	2(1)	2	36(4)	14	2	0
26	MF	(England) Matthew Etherington	30	3	2	0	2	0	6	0	40	3	4	0
27	GK	(England) Carlo Nash	0	0	0	0	0	0	0	0	0	0	0	0
28	DF	(England) Andy Wilkinson	20(5)	0	2(1)	0	0	0	6(2)	0	28(8)	0	8	0
29	GK	(Denmark) Thomas Sørensen	16	0	1	0	2	0	7	0	26	0	2	0
30	DF	(England) Ryan Shotton	14(9)	1	3	0	2	0	5(5)	1	24(14)	2	3	0
32	MF	(Uruguay) Diego Arismendi	0	0	0	0	0	0	2(2)	0	2(2)	0	1	0
33	FW	(England) Cameron Jerome	7(16)	4	3(1)	2	1(1)	0	6(1)	2	17(19)	8	1	1
35	FW	(England) Ben Marshall	0	0	0	0	0	0	0	0	0	0	0	0
36	MF	(Northern Ireland) Matthew Lund	0	0	0	0	0	0	0	0	0	0	0	0
38	MF	(Belgium) Florent Cuvelier	0	0	0	0	0	0	0	0	0	0	0	0
39	DF	(England) Jonathan Woodgate	16(1)	0	1	0	1	0	2	0	20(1)	0	3	0
40	MF	(Honduras) Wilson Palacios	9(9)	0	1	0	1	0	7(1)	0	18(10)	0	2	0
41	MF	(England) Michael Clarkson	0	0	0	0	0	0	0	0	0	0	0	0
42	FW	(England) Louis Moult	0	0	0	0	0	0	0	0	0	0	0	0
44	MF	(England) Lucas Dawson	0	0	0	0	0	0	0	0	0	0	0	0
–	–	Own goals	–	1	–	0	–	0	–	1	–	2	–	–

== Transfers ==
=== In ===
Date	Pos.	Name	From	Fee	Ref.
11 July 2011	DF	(England) Jonathan Woodgate	(England) Tottenham Hotspur	Free	
9 August 2011	DF	(England) Matthew Upson	(England) West Ham United	Free	
31 August 2011	MF	(Honduras) Wilson Palacios	(England) Tottenham Hotspur	Undisclosed	
31 August 2011	MF	(England) Cameron Jerome	(England) Birmingham City	Undisclosed	
31 August 2011	FW	(England) Peter Crouch	(England) Tottenham Hotspur	£10,000,000	

=== Out ===
Date	Pos.	Name	To	Fee	Ref.
27 May 2011	DF	(Senegal) Abdoulaye Faye	(England) West Ham United	Free	
27 August 2011	DF	(Senegal) Ibrahima Sonko	(England) Ipswich Town	Free	
31 May 2011	FW	(Iceland) Eiður Guðjohnsen	(Greece) AEK Athens	Free	
29 July 2011	DF	(England) Carl Dickinson	(England) Watford	Undisclosed	
2 January 2012	MF	(England) Danny Pugh	(England) Leeds United	Undisclosed	
31 January 2012	MF	(England) Ben Marshall	(England) Leicester City	Undisclosed	

=== Loan out ===
Date from	Date to	Pos.	Name	To	Ref.
26 July 2011	21 November 2011	MF	(Northern Ireland) Matty Lund	(England) Oldham Athletic	
3 August 2011	3 September 2011	DF	(England) Andrew Davies	(England) Crystal Palace	
17 August 2011	1 January 2012	FW	(England) Ben Marshall	(England) Sheffield Wednesday	
19 August 2011	19 September 2011	FW	(England) Louis Moult	(England) Accrington Stanley	
9 August 2011	11 December 2011	DF	(Wales) Danny Collins	(England) Ipswich Town	
22 September 2011	1 January 2012	DF	(England) Danny Pugh	(England) Leeds United	
23 September 2011	30 June 2012	DF	(England) Andrew Davies	(England) Bradford City	
23 January 2012	30 June 2012	MF	(England) Tom Soares	(Scotland) Hibernian	
24 January 2012	30 June 2012	MF	(England) Michael Tonge	(England) Barnsley	
27 January 2012	27 February 2012	FW	(England) Ryan Brunt	(England) Tranmere Rovers	
27 January 2012	27 February 2012	MF	(Belgium) Florent Cuvelier	(England) Walsall	
30 January 2012	30 February 2012	MF	(Northern Ireland) Matty Lund	(England) Bristol Rovers	
31 January 2012	30 June 2012	DF	(England) Danny Higginbotham	(England) Nottingham Forest	
9 March 2012	30 June 2012	DF	(Wales) Danny Collins	(England) West Ham United	
16 March 2012	30 June 2012	MF	(Uruguay) Diego Arismendi	(England) Huddersfield Town	
