= 2012–13 Stoke City F.C. season =

Stoke City
2012–13 season
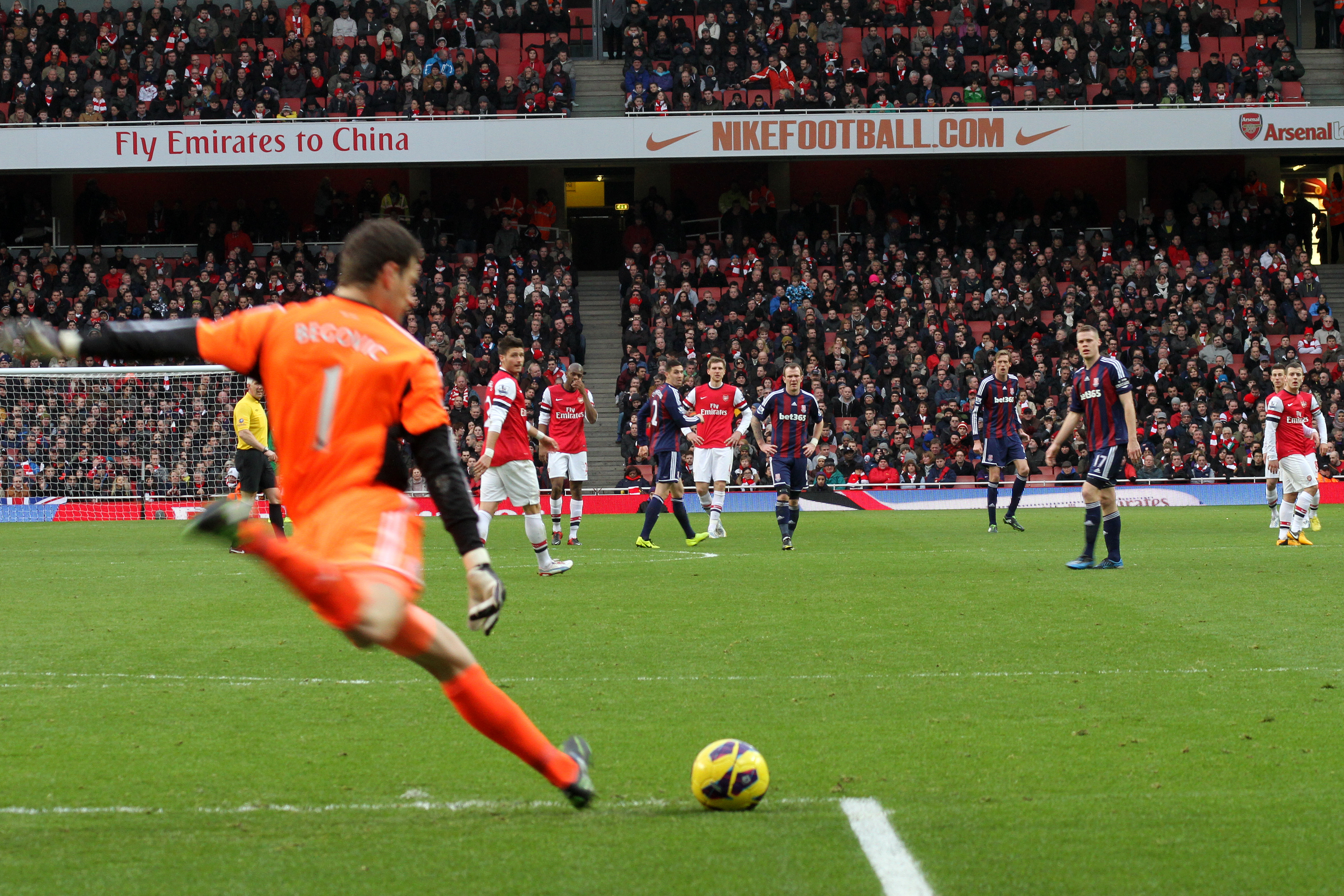
- Stoke City Goalkeeper Asmir Begović takes a goal kick during a match against Arsenal in February 2013
- Chairman: Peter Coates
- Manager: Tony Pulis
- Stadium: Britannia Stadium
- Premier League: 13th (42 points)
- FA Cup: Fourth Round
- League Cup: Second Round
- Top goalscorer: League: Jonathan Walters (8); All: Jonathan Walters (11)
- Highest home attendance: 27,544 v Aston Villa (6 April 2013)
- Lowest home attendance: 24,421 v Wigan Athletic (29 January 2013)
- Average home league attendance: 26,922
Home colours	Away colours

The 2012–13 season was Stoke City's fifth season in the Premier League and the 57th in the top tier of English football. It was also the club's 150th year in existence and to mark the occasion the club had a special crest and the away kit was the same colours that Stoke Ramblers wore back in 1863, navy and cardinal Stoke also had a new shirt sponsor Bet365 taking over from Britannia.

The summer of 2012 saw the departure of fan favourite Ricardo Fuller whilst in came winger Michael Kightly and USA defender Geoff Cameron, later followed by Charlie Adam and Steven Nzonzi. Stoke began the season with four straight draws and an embarrassing League Cup exit to Swindon Town. Despite recording one victory in their opening ten match they did put in some impressive performances away at Chelsea and Manchester United and at home to champions Manchester City. Stoke then went ten matches undefeated from 10 November to 29 December with a 3–1 victory over Liverpool on boxing day the stand out result.

During that run Stoke conceded just seven goals but at the turn of the year their form and performances dropped off as in the next ten matches Stoke picked up just five points, scored only six goals and conceded 19. Results and performances failed to improve and after an awful defeat at home to Aston Villa, Stoke were in danger of being involved in the relegation battle. Back to back wins against Queens Park Rangers and Norwich City lifted Stoke away from the foot of the table and they recovered to finish in 13th position with 42 points. At the end of the season manager Tony Pulis left the club by mutual consent bringing an end to his seven-year tenure at the club. He was replaced by the former Wales, Blackburn Rovers, Manchester City, Fulham and Queens Park Rangers manager Mark Hughes.

== Pre-season ==
There was expectation that several players would leave the club in the summer with a number reaching the end of their contacts and chairman Peter Coates said that Tony Pulis will have to sell if he wants to buy. Pulis released Louis Moult, Tom Soares, Salif Diao and club legend Ricardo Fuller after the end of their contracts and Jonathan Woodgate and Danny Collins left for Middlesbrough and Nottingham Forest respectively. On 8 August Wolverhampton Wanderers winger Michael Kightly joined that club for an undisclosed fee.

For the 2012–13 pre-season, Stoke travelled to the United States where they will spend eleven days and play matches against Major League Soccer sides Columbus Crew and Sporting Kansas City as well as affiliated USL Pro club Orlando City. Matches were also arranged against Swiss side FC Sion and German Bundesliga team SpVgg Greuther Fürth.

Stoke began their pre-season in Switzerland and played a match against FC Sion which was won 1–0 thanks to a penalty from Matthew Etherington. City then travelled to The USA and played their first match against the Columbus Crew. Despite taking the lead via Jonathan Walters the Americans were much brighter and scored twice through Aaron Horton and Ben Speas. The next match against affiliated club Orlando City saw Stoke win 1–0 with Walters scoring his second goal of pre-season but it was marred with Glenn Whelan being sent off after a harmless altercation with former Stoke midfielder James O'Connor. Stoke's final match in USA against Sporting Kansas City saw Stoke miss a number of chances but did eventually take the lead with six minutes left when Michael Tonge whose only contribution to the club is in pre-season was fouled in the area and he scored the spot kick. Stoke however conceded a comical equaliser as Asmir Begović's clearance went straight to Kyle Miller who had the easy task of heading the ball into an empty net.

On their return to England they played two matches against Football League opposition, Torquay United and Yeovil Town. Both matches ended 1–1 and they had a Polish international trialist Sebastian Boenisch playing at left back. The final match of pre-season saw Stoke take on German side SpVgg Greuther Fürth in Bavaria. New signing Michael Kightly made a perfect start to his Stoke career scoring with his first touch. Matthew Upson gave away a penalty and Bernd Nehrig scored from the spot and for the four time in pre-season that match finished 1–1. Afterwards Tony Pulis revealed that Stoke had agreed to take Macedonian left back Goran Popov on loan from Dynamo Kyiv until the end of the season. However the move collapsed as he failed to gain a work permit.

Match	Date	Opponent	Venue	Result	Attendance	Scorers	Report
1	18 July 2012	Sion	A	1–0	200	Etherington 38' (pen)	Report
2	24 July 2012	Columbus Crew	A	1–2	8,976	Walters 23'	Report
3	28 July 2012	Orlando City	A	1–0	10,441	Walters 45'	Report
4	1 August 2012	Sporting Kansas City	A	1–1	16,197	Tonge 84' (pen)	Report
5	6 August 2012	Torquay United	A	1–1	2,155	Downes 43' (o.g.)	Report
6	7 August 2012	Yeovil Town	A	1–1	2,106	Jones 57'	Report
7	10 August 2012	SpVgg Greuther Fürth	A	1–1	3,750	Kightly 3'	Report

== Premier League ==
=== August ===
Stoke's first league match of the 2012–13 season saw them come up against newly promoted Reading at the Madejski Stadium. New signing Michael Kightly made his league debut and marked it with scoring the opening goal albeit thanks to an error from "Royals" goalkeeper Adam Federici. The home side were not posing much of a threat to Stoke's goal but they were gifted the chance to equalise in the final minute of the match as Dean Whitehead brought down Garath McCleary in the area and conceded a penalty, and to make matters worse for Whitehead he was shown a second yellow. Adam Le Fondre made no mistake from the spot and it was a case of two points dropped for Stoke.

The first home match of the season was against old adversaries Arsenal with the match being broadcast live on TV. Geoff Cameron made his first appearance in a red and white shirt and produced a good performance in a match which surprisingly failed to live up to the buildup. There were few moments of excitement with Jonathan Walters having Stoke's best effort, hitting the back of the net but it was ruled out for offside. The "Gunners" struggled to make Asmir Begović work in the City goal and the match finished in a rather tame goalless draw. On transfer deadline day Stoke completed the signings of midfielders Charlie Adam, Maurice Edu and Steven Nzonzi.

=== September ===
Charlie Adam and Maurice Edu were both on the bench for the match at 'bogey' side Wigan Athletic. Stoke made a terrible start to the match conceding a penalty after just four minutes after Robert Huth handled in the area and Shaun Maloney made no mistake from the spot. The away support were beginning to vent their frustration towards Pulis but after half an hour he brought on Adam for his debut. He impressed instantly with his passing ability and Stoke were awarded a penalty of their own just before half time, Jonathan Walters scoring for Stoke. But poor defending at the start of the second half gifted Franco Di Santo a goal and Stoke were again chasing the match. Peter Crouch scored his first league goal of the season and Stoke could have won it but for a wonder save from Ali Al-Habsi denying Adam a debut goal.

On 4 September Stoke announced the signing of former Real Madrid and England striker Michael Owen on a one-year contract. Nzonzi and Adam made their home debuts against Premier League title holders Manchester City as Stoke lined up in a new look formation which included three centre midfielders. And it was Stoke who took the lead via Peter Crouch, although TV replays showed that he handled in the buildup. Stoke then had to as expected weather a lot of pressure from Man City but they leveled from a set play, Javi García being left unmarked. Michael Owen came off the bench for the final few moments as Begović and Shawcross prevented Manchester City winning the match late on. It was Stoke's fourth draw in a row and all from the start of a season, a club record. After the match Andy Wilkinson was handed a three match ban after an off the ball altercation with Mario Balotelli.

Stoke then played Chelsea at Stamford Bridge, and were the better side for most of the 90 minutes. They had chances to take the points with Walters hitting the crossbar and Kightly and Crouch guilty of missed opportunities and Chelsea took full advantage with Ashley Cole scoring with five minutes left handing Stoke an undeserved defeat.

Stoke went into their next match at home to Swansea looking for their first win of the season and that's what they got after a simple enough victory. Michael Laudrup's Swansea as expected enjoyed a large amount of possession but they never threatened to trouble Stoke's defence and Peter Crouch scored twice before half time to settle the contest.

=== October ===
Prior to the League match against Liverpool Stoke were handed a boost when captain Ryan Shawcross earned a call up to the England team. The match against Liverpool saw both sides cancel each other out in a bad tempered 0–0 draw.

After the international break Stoke completed their tough set of opening fixtures away at Manchester United. Stoke made a great start and took the lead through an own goal by Wayne Rooney and Stoke could have added to their goal tally with Adam and Walters going close. But poor defending cost Stoke dearly as Rooney, Robin van Persie and Danny Welbeck saw the "Red Devils" turn the match in their favour. Kightly pulled one back but Rooney scored his second goal to make it 4–2.

The next match saw Stoke and Sunderland play out an uneventful and lifeless goalless draw at the Britannia but it proved to be a costly one for Stoke as left back Marc Wilson broke his fibula.

=== November ===
Stoke then put in a poor performance away at Norwich City going down by a solitary goal from Bradley Johnson.

Stoke went into their next match then against bottom of the table Queens Park Rangers looking for a much needed win. It was a scrappy encounter with Rangers' Adel Taarabt causing City's defence problems with his skill but were also thankful for his poor decision making which left him squandering QPR's best chances. Charlie Adam scored his first goal for Stoke just after half time and that proved to be the winning goal.

Stoke's next match was against in form West Ham United moved to a Monday night for live TV coverage. Stoke began the match brightly and scored through Walters after 13 minutes via a well worked corner routine. City continued to dominate the first half and almost scored again but Nzonzi's powerful shot cannoned off the woodwork. However it was role reversal in the second half at the "Hammers" took control of the game and soon levelled through Joey O'Brien but Stoke fought off West Ham's revival and earned a decent point.

Stoke then began a three-game week with a home match against Fulham and for the second match at the Britannia the match was settled by a single goal from Charlie Adam. Stoke had several chances to win by a bigger margin but were guilty of poor finishing.

The mid-week match against an out of form Newcastle United side saw Stoke come from behind to claim a late victory. Papiss Cissé put the "Magpies" in front just after half time capitalising on an error from Glenn Whelan. Substitutes Kenwyne Jones and Cameron Jerome then came off the bench to spark Stoke's turnaround. Firstly, Jerome provided an assist for Jonathan Walters and then scored the winning goal after being set up by Jones.

=== December ===
Stoke's then played high-flying West Bromwich Albion who at the time were in the top four. Stoke produced a disciplined defensive performance nullifying Albion's attack and grabbed a 1–0 win thanks to a rare goal from Dean Whitehead.

Stoke again played away at Midlands opponents this time Aston Villa and both sides cancelled each other out in a drab goalless draw. Stoke had Ryan Shotton sent off for two bookable offences.

Stoke then played out a bruising 1–1 draw with Everton on 15 December. The "Toffees" took the lead after Steven Pienaar's cross was deflected into the net by Ryan Shawcross and the visitors almost scored again soon after with Leon Osman missing from close range. Stoke levelled thanks to Kenwyne Jones' first league goal since August 2011 but the major indecent of the match saw Marouane Fellaini deliberately headbutt Shawcross which was missed by referee Mark Halsey. After the match Fellaini issued a public apology to Shawcross and was given a retrospective three match ban.

City then earned their fifth goalless draw of the season (10th in total) with an impressive defensive display at Tottenham Hotspur.

On Boxing day City took on Liverpool in a late evening kick-off and the visitors took the lead very early on as after just 30 seconds Luis Suárez was fouled in the area and Steven Gerrard scored the spot kick. Stoke instantly replied with Walters and then Jones to turn the game around and victory was completed in the second half with Walters scoring a second to earn Stoke a 3–1 win.

The final match of 2012 saw another incident packed 90 minutes against Southampton. Stoke without key defensive duo Shawcross and Cameron saw the "Saints" take the lead through Rickie Lambert but Stoke soon levelled though a Jones back heel. Then two awful defensive mistakes gave the away side a 3–1 lead. Stoke pulled one back through Matthew Upson midway through the second half and then had Steven Nzonzi sent off for an apparent stamp on Jack Cork. Stoke did make it 3–3 with Cameron Jerome scoring from 30 yards in the final minute. Nzonzi's red card was later rescinded by the FA.

=== January ===
Stoke began 2013 with another tame 3–0 defeat away at Manchester City on 1 January, ending Stoke's ten-match unbeaten run. Manchester City were in complete control of the match and only their poor finishing prevented them taking the lead. Eventually they did break the deadlock just before half-time after James Milner's cross was blocked by Begović but Pablo Zabaleta was able to score the rebound. The second half continued in the same vein and after Sergio Agüero's shot was parried by the Stoke keeper his compatriot Edin Džeko scored a simple tap-in. Stoke tried to hit back through a Charlie Adam free-kick before Walters blazed a shot over from close-range. Stoke's misery was compounded when Nzonzi fouled David Silva and conceded a penalty which Agüero converted, with Nzonzi receiving a yellow card for the foul.

Chelsea then ended Stoke's 11-month unbeaten home run in the Premier League in emphatic fashion beating Stoke 4–0. However it was a harsh scoreline as Chelsea's goals came from two own goals from, Jonathan Walters a Frank Lampard penalty and a long-range effort from Eden Hazard. To add to Walters' woe he also missed a last minute penalty.

Stoke's awful start to 2013 continued with a poor 3–1 loss at Swansea City After a goalless first half Swansea dominated the second period and took the lead through their full-back Ben Davies. After Adam had fouled Michu, Dutch midfielder Jonathan de Guzmán curled in the free-kick and then Jerome missed an easy chance to pull one back for Stoke. de Guzmán ended the game as a contest when he scored to complete a flowing Swansea move although Stoke did manage to get a consolation goal, Michael Owen scoring in the final minute for what was his 150th Premier League goal.

Stoke then threw away a two-goal lead against Wigan Athletic on 29 January, their fourth 2–2 draw with Wigan in four seasons. Stoke ended the month by completing the transfers of USA international Brek Shea and England goalkeeper Jack Butland.

=== February ===
Stoke continued their poor run with a narrow 1–0 defeat at Arsenal courtesy of a Lukas Podolski free-kick.

Stoke secured their first league win of 2013 against Reading. After a goalless first half Stoke scored through a Robert Huth header and a fine goal from Jerome but the Royals quickly responded with Adrian Mariappa heading a late corner but Stoke held on for a 2–1 victory.

After a two-week international break Stoke travelled to Craven Cottage to take on Fulham. Stoke failed to improve on their terrible away record of one win in 23 as Martin Jol's side won 1–0 thanks to a fine volley from Dimitar Berbatov. Stoke had the chance to earn a point from the penalty spot but Walters's kick was weak and easily saved by Mark Schwarzer. It got worse for Stoke as Huth was given a retrospective three match ban after an off the ball altercation with Philippe Senderos.

=== March ===
With Huth suspended Marc Wilson filled in a centre back against West Ham United in what was another poor performance by Stoke. West Ham scored the only goal via Jack Collison and the Stoke supporters began to vent their frustration at manager Tony Pulis.

Stoke's next away match was against Newcastle United and Stoke took the lead in the second half with Walters converting a penalty which he won. Stoke could not hold out for a point though as the Magpies drew level through a Yohan Cabaye free-kick and then Papiss Cissé scored in the final minute to extended Stoke's losing run to three matches.

The Midlands derby against West Brom was a good opportunity for Stoke to end their poor form but it turned out to be a frustrating afternoon. There was few chances from both sides and Stoke's best chance came in the final minute through Kenwyne Jones but he could only hit his shot straight at Ben Foster and the match finished in a drab 0–0 draw.

Stoke's final game of a barren March saw them travel to Everton. Stoke missed a glorious chance to take an early lead after a Ryan Shotton long throw-in was headed towards goal by Huth and saved by Tim Howard, Walters could only hit the crossbar. Everton had a couple half-chances though Nikica Jelavić before they scored in fine style. A Marc Wilson cross was punched away by Howard and the ball fell for Belgian Kevin Mirallas who broke clear of the retreating Stoke defence and slotted the ball past Begović. Stoke had chances in the second half to pull level but failed to take them with Walters, Huth, Shotton and Jerome all guilty of poor finishing and Everton won the match 1–0.

=== April ===
Stoke entered the final six games of the 2012–13 season with a vital home match against Midlands rivals Aston Villa at the Britannia Stadium. Stoke got off to an awful start after poor defending let in Gabriel Agbonlahor to score after ten minutes. Stoke failed to trouble Brad Guzan and Villa almost scored again through Andreas Weimann whose shot hit the post. City improved marginally after the break and scored in the 80th minute through substitute Michael Kightly. But Villa defender Matthew Lowton then scored an unstoppable goal, a volley from 30 yards and with Stoke pushing for an equaliser they were caught on the counterattack and Christian Benteke sealed a 3–1 win and left Stoke fully involved in the relegation fight.

Stoke's slide towards the relegation zone continued with 2–0 home defeat against champions elect Manchester United on 14 April. The Potters made an awful start conceding after just four minutes after a Robin van Persie corner was not dealt with by the Stoke defence and the ball was prodded in by Michael Carrick. Stoke rarely threatened David de Gea and when he was finally tested by Charlie Adam Stoke gave away a penalty after Wilkinson fouled van Persie in the area who converted the spot kick. Pulis decided to impose a media ban for the remainder of the season on his players in order to 'keep them focused'.

City then travelled to lowly Queens Park Rangers and came away with a vital 2–0 victory only their 2nd win of 2013. Peter Crouch scored for the first time since January and a Walters penalty lifted Stoke six points away from danger.

Stoke then beat Norwich City 1–0 on 27 April to move them onto the 40 point mark in a match which saw the supporters pay tribute to former player Paul Ware. Charlie Adam scored the only goal of the game just after half-time, Stoke could have added a second but Crouch was guilty of some poor finishing.

=== May ===
Stoke played relegation threatened Sunderland on 6 May and Stoke took a 9th-minute lead through Walters after Sunderland failed to clear a Charlie Adam corner. It got worse for the Black Cats as Craig Gardner was sent-off for a foul on Adam just before half time. However Sunderland managed to earn a point thanks to a goal from John O'Shea.

The last home match of the 2012–13 season against Tottenham Hotspur was used as a 'celebration match' for the club's 150th anniversary. To mark the occasion 80 former players attended the match and performed a lap of honour whilst the supporters received a free T-shirt. Stoke started the match brilliantly with Steven Nzonzi scoring his first goal for City after just three minutes. Spurs levelled through Clint Dempsey who punished a defensive mix-up between Wilson and Begović. Just after half time Stoke's task was made harder when Charlie Adam picked up a second yellow card meaning Stoke had to play the remaining 40 minutes with ten men. Stoke couldn't hold on to a draw as Emmanuel Adebayor scored the winning goal for Spurs.

Stoke ended the 2012–13 season with a 1–1 draw away at Southampton, Crouch scoring just after half time for Stoke before Rickie Lambert made sure the season ended with a draw. It proved to be Pulis' final game in charge of Stoke as two days later he left the club by mutual consent. He was replaced by fellow Welshman Mark Hughes. This was also the final match in Michael Owen's career, in only his 8th appearance for Stoke he got a standing ovation from both set of fans.

=== Results ===
Match	Date	Opponent	Venue	Result	Attendance	Scorers	Report
1	18 August 2012	Reading	A	1–1	23,793	Kightly 34'	Report
2	26 August 2012	Arsenal	H	0–0	27,072		Report
3	1 September 2012	Wigan Athletic	A	2–2	16,247	Walters 40' (pen), Crouch 76'	Report
4	15 September 2012	Manchester City	H	1–1	27,101	Crouch 15'	Report
5	22 September 2012	Chelsea	A	0–1	41,112		Report
6	29 September 2012	Swansea City	H	2–0	27,330	Crouch (2) 12', 36'	Report
7	7 October 2012	Liverpool	A	0–0	44,531		Report
8	20 October 2012	Manchester United	A	2–4	75,585	Rooney 11' (o.g.), Kightly 58'	Report
9	27 October 2012	Sunderland	H	0–0	27,005		Report
10	3 November 2012	Norwich City	A	0–1	26,072		Report
11	10 November 2012	Queens Park Rangers	H	1–0	27,529	Adam 52'	Report
12	19 November 2012	West Ham United	A	1–1	35,005	Walters 13'	Report
13	24 November 2012	Fulham	H	1–0	26,921	Adam 26'	Report
14	28 November 2012	Newcastle United	H	2–1	26,793	Walters 81', Jerome 85'	Report
15	1 December 2012	West Bromwich Albion	A	1–0	23,739	Whitehead 75'	Report
16	8 December 2012	Aston Villa	A	0–0	30,110		Report
17	15 December 2012	Everton	H	1–1	27,008	Jones 52'	Report
18	22 December 2012	Tottenham Hotspur	A	0–0	35,702		Report
19	26 December 2012	Liverpool	H	3–1	27,490	Walters (2) 5', 49', Jones 12'	Report
20	29 December 2012	Southampton	H	3–3	26,391	Jones 16', Upson 67', Jerome 90'	Report
21	1 January 2013	Manchester City	A	0–3	47,192		Report
22	12 January 2013	Chelsea	H	0–4	27,348		Report
23	19 January 2013	Swansea City	A	1–3	19,603	Owen 90'	Report
24	29 January 2013	Wigan Athletic	H	2–2	24,421	Shawcross 23', Crouch 48'	Report
25	2 February 2013	Arsenal	A	0–1	59,872		Report
26	9 February 2013	Reading	H	2–1	26,737	Huth 67', Jerome 81'	Report
27	23 February 2013	Fulham	A	0–1	25,458		Report
28	2 March 2013	West Ham United	H	0–1	26,250		Report
29	10 March 2013	Newcastle United	A	1–2	50,703	Walters 67' (pen)	Report
30	16 March 2013	West Bromwich Albion	H	0–0	26,137		Report
31	30 March 2013	Everton	A	0–1	33,977		Report
32	6 April 2013	Aston Villa	H	1–3	27,544	Kightly 80'	Report
33	14 April 2013	Manchester United	H	0–2	27,191		Report
34	20 April 2013	Queens Park Rangers	A	2–0	17,391	Crouch 42', Walters 77' (pen)	Report
35	27 April 2013	Norwich City	H	1–0	27,488	Adam 46'	Report
36	6 May 2013	Sunderland	A	1–1	38,130	Walters 9'	Report
37	12 May 2013	Tottenham Hotspur	H	1–2	27,531	Nzonzi 3'	Report
38	19 May 2013	Southampton	A	1–1	31,539	Crouch 47'	Report

=== Final league table ===
Pos	Team	Pld	W	D	L	GF	GA	GD	Pts	Qualification or relegation
1	Manchester United (C)	38	28	5	5	86	43	+43	89	Qualification for the Champions League group stage
2	Manchester City	38	23	9	6	66	34	+32	78	Qualification for the Champions League group stage
3	Chelsea	38	22	9	7	75	39	+36	75	Qualification for the Champions League group stage
4	Arsenal	38	21	10	7	72	37	+35	73	Qualification for the Champions League play-off round
5	Tottenham Hotspur	38	21	9	8	66	46	+20	72	Qualification for the Europa League play-off round
6	Everton	38	16	15	7	55	40	+15	63	
7	Liverpool	38	16	13	9	71	43	+28	61	
8	West Bromwich Albion	38	14	7	17	53	57	−4	49	
9	Swansea City	38	11	13	14	47	51	−4	46	Qualification for the Europa League third qualifying round (Note: Swansea City qualified for the Europa League third qualifying round as the 2012–13 Football League Cup winners.)
10	West Ham United	38	12	10	16	45	53	−8	46	
11	Norwich City	38	10	14	14	41	58	−17	44	
12	Fulham	38	11	10	17	50	60	−10	43	
13	Stoke City	38	9	15	14	34	45	−11	42	
14	Southampton	38	9	14	15	49	60	−11	41	
15	Aston Villa	38	10	11	17	47	69	−22	41	
16	Newcastle United	38	11	8	19	45	68	−23	41	
17	Sunderland	38	9	12	17	41	54	−13	39	
18	Wigan Athletic (R)	38	9	9	20	47	73	−26	36	Qualification for the Europa League group stage and relegation to Football League Championship (Note: Wigan Athletic qualified for the Europa League group stage as the 2012–13 FA Cup winners.)
19	Reading (R)	38	6	10	22	43	73	−30	28	Relegation to Football League Championship
20	Queens Park Rangers (R)	38	4	13	21	30	60	−30	25	Relegation to Football League Championship

Source: Barclays Premier League
Rules for classification: 1) Points; 2) Goal difference; 3) Goals scored; 4) Play-offs (only if needed to decide champion, teams for relegation or teams for UEFA competitions).
(C) Champions; (R) Relegated

== FA Cup ==
Stoke were drawn away at Championship side Crystal Palace in the third round and the match at Selhurst Park saw both sides cancel each other out in a 0–0 draw meaning that a replay would be required.

The replay was a far more eventful affair which began with the tricky Wilfried Zaha winning a penalty but Jermaine Easter's spot kick was saved by Sørensen. Kenwyne Jones put Stoke in front on 70 minutes before Palace were awarded another penalty which Glenn Murray converted to send the tie into extra time. With Palace tiring Stoke took full advantage and a brace from Walters and a last minute strike from Cameron Jerome earned Stoke a 4–1 victory.

The fourth round saw a repeat of the 2011 FA Cup Final, unfortunately for Stoke the outcome was the same, Man City winning 1–0, thanks to a late strike from Pablo Zabaleta.

Round	Date	Opponent	Venue	Result	Attendance	Scorers	Report
R3	5 January 2013	Crystal Palace	A	0–0	13,693		Report
R3 Replay	15 January 2013	Crystal Palace	H	4–1 (aet)	11,617	Jones 69', Walters (2) 95', 110', Jerome 120'	Report
R4	26 January 2013	Manchester City	H	0–1	19,814		Report

== League Cup ==
Stoke were on the receiving end of a cup upset as League One Swindon Town knocked Stoke out in the second round. The "Robins" showed no fear at playing at the Britannia Stadium and took the lead through James Collins after a Thomas Sørensen mistake. Swindon and Collins scored again just before half time and they also had chances to increase their goal tally much to the anger of Stoke fans who booed their team off at half time. In the second half Stoke scored through Kenwyne Jones and Jonathan Walters to send the tie into extra time. However, despite squandering their two-goal lead Swindon were not affected and scored again through Aden Flint but Peter Crouch replied for Stoke. Jamie Ness had to leave the action after picking up an injury and it seemed it would go all the way to a penalty shoot-out but Collins beat the offside trap and claimed his hat-trick and victory for Paolo Di Canio's Swindon.

Round	Date	Opponent	Venue	Result	Attendance	Scorers	Report
R2	28 August 2012	Swindon Town	H	3–4 (aet)	9,147	Jones 63', Walters 86', Crouch 111'	Report

== Squad statistics ==
No.	Pos.	Name	Premier League		FA Cup		League Cup		Total		Discipline	
No.	Pos.	Name	Apps	Goals	Apps	Goals	Apps	Goals	Apps	Goals	Yellow card	Red card
1	GK	(Bosnia and Herzegovina) Asmir Begović	38	0	0	0	0	0	38	0	3	0
2	DF	(United States) Geoff Cameron	29(6)	0	2	0	1	0	32(6)	0	5	0
3	DF	(England) Danny Higginbotham	0	0	0	0	0	0	0	0	0	0
4	DF	(Germany) Robert Huth	35	1	3	0	1	0	39	1	5	0
6	MF	(Republic of Ireland) Glenn Whelan	31(1)	0	1(1)	0	0	0	32(2)	0	3	0
7	MF	(England) Jermaine Pennant	1	0	0	0	1	0	2	0	0	0
8	MF	(Honduras) Wilson Palacios	0(4)	0	0	0	0	0	0(4)	0	0	0
9	FW	(Trinidad and Tobago) Kenwyne Jones	10(16)	3	1(2)	1	1	1	12(18)	5	0	0
10	FW	(England) Michael Owen	0(8)	1	1	0	0	0	1(8)	1	0	0
11	FW	(Mali) Mamady Sidibé	0	0	0	0	0	0	0	0	0	0
12	DF	(Republic of Ireland) Marc Wilson	19	0	0	0	1	0	20	0	3	0
13	MF	(United States) Maurice Edu	0(1)	0	0	0	0	0	0(1)	0	0	0
14	MF	(Scotland) Jamie Ness	0	0	0	0	0(1)	0	0(1)	0	0	0
15	MF	(France) Steven Nzonzi	35	1	3	0	0	0	38	1	9	0
16	MF	(Scotland) Charlie Adam	22(5)	3	0(1)	0	0	0	22(6)	3	9	1
17	DF	(England) Ryan Shawcross (c)	37	1	3	0	0	0	40	1	8	0
18	MF	(England) Dean Whitehead	12(14)	1	2(1)	0	1	0	15(15)	1	11	1
19	FW	(Republic of Ireland) Jonathan Walters	38	8	3	2	0(1)	1	41(1)	11	4	0
20	DF	(England) Matthew Upson	1	1	0	0	1	0	2	1	0	0
21	MF	(England) Michael Kightly	14(8)	3	3	0	1	0	18(8)	3	2	0
22	MF	(United States) Brek Shea	0(2)	0	0	0	0	0	0(2)	0	0	0
23	MF	(England) Michael Tonge	0	0	0	0	0	0	0	0	0	0
24	MF	(Republic of Ireland) Rory Delap	0(1)	0	0	0	0	0	0(1)	0	0	0
25	FW	(England) Peter Crouch	28(6)	7	2(1)	0	0(1)	1	30(8)	8	2	0
26	MF	(England) Matthew Etherington	21(10)	0	2	0	0	0	23(10)	0	2	0
27	GK	(England) Carlo Nash	0	0	0	0	0	0	0	0	0	0
28	DF	(England) Andy Wilkinson	19(5)	0	2	0	0	0	21(5)	0	6	0
29	GK	(Denmark) Thomas Sørensen	0	0	3	0	1	0	4	0	0	0
30	DF	(England) Ryan Shotton	20(3)	0	2	0	1	0	23(3)	0	7	1
32	MF	(Uruguay) Diego Arismendi	0	0	0	0	0	0	0	0	0	0
33	FW	(England) Cameron Jerome	8(18)	3	0(3)	1	1	0	9(21)	4	3	0
36	MF	(Northern Ireland) Matthew Lund	0	0	0	0	0	0	0	0	0	0
38	MF	(Belgium) Florent Cuvelier	0	0	0	0	0	0	0	0	0	0
–	–	Own goals	–	1	–	0	–	0	–	1	–	–

== Transfers ==
=== In ===
Date	Pos.	Name	From	Fee	Ref.
3 July 2012	MF	(Scotland) Jamie Ness	(Scotland) Rangers	Free	
8 August 2012	MF	(England) Michael Kightly	(England) Wolverhampton Wanderers	Undisclosed	
8 August 2012	DF	(United States) Geoff Cameron	(United States) Houston Dynamo	£2.5 million	
31 August 2012	MF	(United States) Maurice Edu	(Scotland) Rangers	Undisclosed	
31 August 2012	MF	(Scotland) Charlie Adam	(England) Liverpool	£4 million	
31 August 2012	MF	(France) Steven Nzonzi	(England) Blackburn Rovers	£3 million	
4 September 2012	FW	(England) Michael Owen	(England) Manchester United	Free	
31 January 2013	MF	(United States) Brek Shea	(United States) FC Dallas	£2.5 million	
31 January 2013	GK	(England) Jack Butland	(England) Birmingham City	£3.5 million	

=== Out ===
Date	Pos.	Name	To	Fee	Ref.
24 May 2012	DF	(England) Andrew Davies	(England) Bradford City	Free	
30 June 2012	MF	(England) Tom Soares	(England) Bury	Free	
30 June 2012	MF	(Senegal) Salif Diao	Retired		
30 June 2012	FW	(England) Louis Moult	(England) Northampton Town	Free	
7 July 2012	DF	(England) Jonathan Woodgate	(England) Middlesbrough	Free	
24 July 2012	DF	(Wales) Danny Collins	(England) Nottingham Forest	Undisclosed	
22 August 2012	FW	(Jamaica) Ricardo Fuller	(England) Charlton Athletic	Free	
1 January 2013	DF	(England) Danny Higginbotham	(England) Sheffield United	Free	
10 January 2013	MF	(England) Michael Tonge	(England) Leeds United	Undisclosed	

=== Loan out ===
Date from	Date to	Pos.	Name	To	Ref.
13 July 2012	28 January 2013	MF	(Northern Ireland) Matty Lund	(England) Bristol Rovers	
16 July 2012	5 January 2013	MF	(Belgium) Florent Cuvelier	(England) Walsall	
17 July 2012	5 January 2013	MF	(England) Ryan Brunt	(England) Leyton Orient	
13 September 2012	December 2012	MF	(England) Michael Tonge	(England) Leeds United	
21 September 2012	21 October 2012	DF	(England) Danny Higginbotham	(England) Ipswich Town	
12 October 2012	1 January 2013	MF	(England) Jermaine Pennant	(England) Wolverhampton Wanderers	
23 November 2012	23 December 2012	FW	(Mali) Mamady Sidibé	(England) Sheffield Wednesday	
31 January 2013	30 June 2013	MF	(Republic of Ireland) Rory Delap	(England) Barnsley	
27 March 2013	30 June 2013	MF	(Belgium) Florent Cuvelier	(England) Peterborough United	
