= Salif Diao =

Senegalese footballer (born 1977)

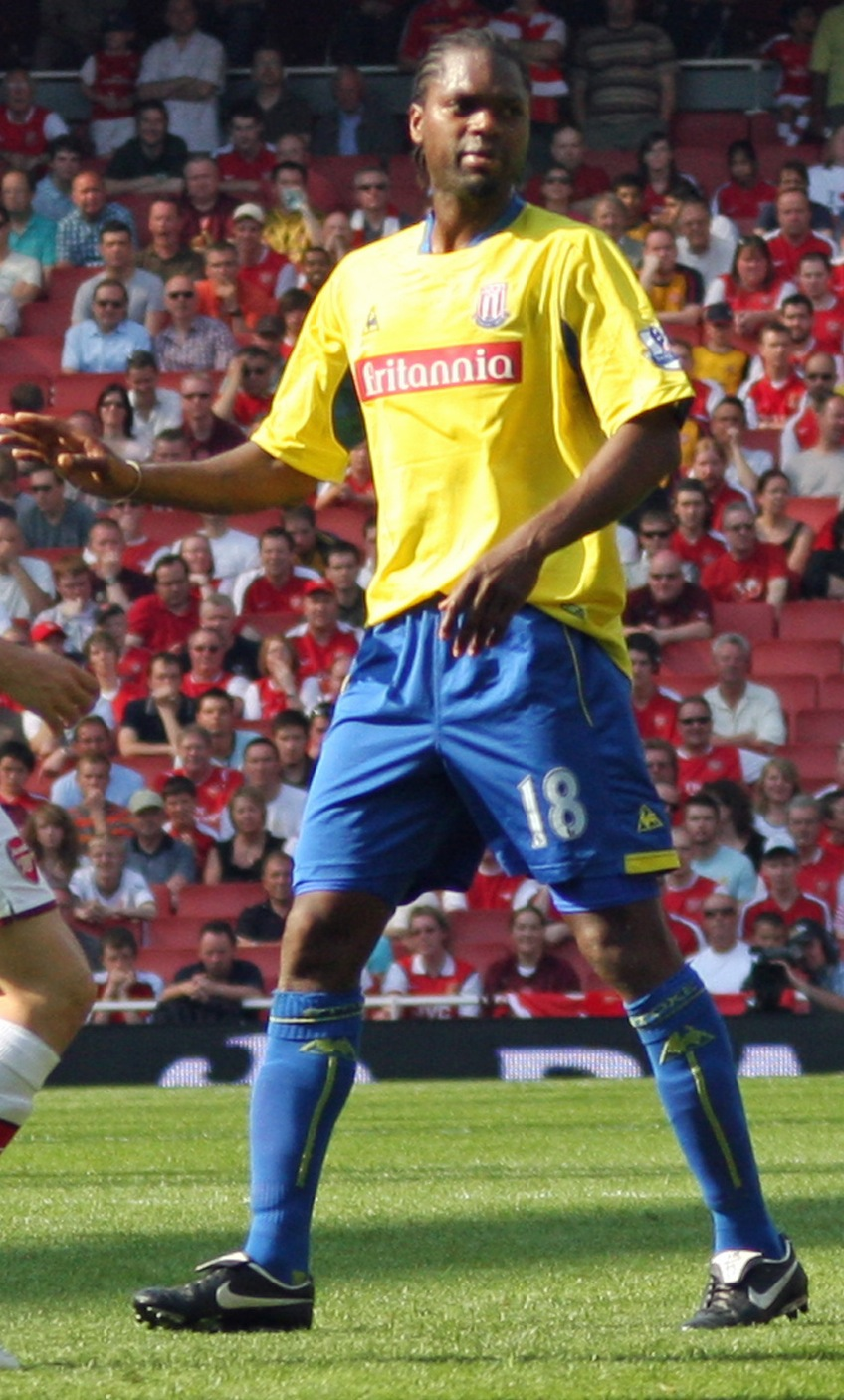
- Diao playing for Stoke City in 2009

Personal information
- Full name: Salif Alassane Diao
- Date of birth: 10 February 1977 (age 49)
- Place of birth: Kédougou, Senegal
- Height: 1.83 m (6 ft 0 in)
- Position: Defensive midfielder

Senior career*
Years	Team	Apps	(Gls)
1996–2000	Monaco	27	(0)
1996–1997	→ Épinal (loan)	2	(0)
2000–2002	Sedan	49	(0)
2002–2007	Liverpool	37	(1)
2005	→ Birmingham City (loan)	2	(0)
2005–2006	→ Portsmouth (loan)	11	(0)
2006–2007	→ Stoke City (loan)	16	(0)
2007–2012	Stoke City	72	(1)
Total		216	(2)

International career
2000–2009	Senegal	39	(4)
- * Club domestic league appearances and goals

Salif Alassane Diao (born 10 February 1977) is a Senegalese former professional footballer who played as a defensive midfielder.

Diao moved from Senegal to France when he was seventeen and started his career at Monaco, with whom he helped with the Trophée des Champions and Division 1. He failed to hold down a regular place at Monaco and moved to Sedan in 2000. Diao then had an impressive 2002 World Cup with Senegal, which attracted the attention of several Premier League sides. It was Liverpool who won the race and signed Diao for £5 million in 2002.

His time at Liverpool was unsuccessful and he was sent out on loan to Birmingham City, Portsmouth and Stoke City. He joined the latter Stoke permanently on a free transfer in 2007 and helped the club to promotion to the Premier League in 2008.

== Career ==
=== Monaco ===
Diao was born in Kédougou, Tambacounda Region. He began his career in his native country before moving to France at the age of seventeen. He begin his professional career playing for Monaco in 1996, but did not feature for the club at all in the 1996–1997 season and was loaned out the Ligue 2 side Épinal, where he played two matches for the club. He returned to Monaco for the 1997–98 season, where he played 12 times in his second season at the club. He was also part of the Monaco side that won Division 1 in the 1999–2000 season. He also won a runner-up medal in the 2002 African Cup of Nations, where Senegal lost in extra time to Cameroon.

=== Sedan Ardennes ===
In 2001, he signed for Sedan. He played 32 games in all competitions in his first season at Sedan in the 2001–02 season, including three matches in the UEFA Cup. He made his first start of the on 28 July 2001 in their 1–1 draw away at Bastia. He made 22 appearances for Sedan in his second season at the club, with an extra two games in the UEFA Cup. His last game for Sedan came in their 1–1 draw with Lorient on 6 April 2002, before joining English club Liverpool.

=== Liverpool ===
He was signed by former Liverpool manager Gérard Houllier from French club Sedan for £5 million (€7.5m) just before the 2002 World Cup in South Korea and Japan. He helped Senegal reach the quarter-finals, most notably in scoring a memorable goal against Denmark in the first round, although he was subsequently red-carded.

At the club, he tended to be used out of position by Houllier, often played at centre back or full back, and as a result never had the chance to demonstrate whether he was capable of playing a central midfield role for the club, although the evidence did suggest he was somewhat out of his depth. His first Liverpool goal came against Spartak Moscow in the Champions League. He scored a total of three goals, only one coming in the league, in a 1–0 win at Leeds United in October 2002. He was left out of Liverpool's squad for the victorious 2003 Football League Cup Final despite playing often in the earlier rounds, including the semi-final first leg against Sheffield United.

Diao was played in his correct position by Rafa Benítez, but several poor displays saw him displaced by Xabi Alonso, notably after a 4–2 win at Fulham. Liverpool were 2–0 down when Diao was substituted; he had been at fault for one of the goals Fulham scored whilst attempting a bizarre back heel. Despite not having featured for months, Diao was present in Istanbul when Liverpool won the Champions League in 2005. He appeared only once in the campaign, coming on as a substitute away at Olympiacos in the group stage. It was during the 2004–05 season that Diao scored his last Liverpool goal against Millwall in the League Cup; he played his last game for Liverpool at Norwich City in January 2005.

In January 2005, Birmingham City took Diao, who had struggled to make Liverpool's first team, on loan for the rest of the season, but he had his spell at Birmingham ended by injury almost immediately. The arrival of Rafael Benítez and defensive midfielder Mohamed Sissoko signalled the end of his Liverpool career. Although Sissoko was branded the "new Vieira" by Benítez, Diao had received this same tag from Houllier upon his arrival at Liverpool.

Diao was not issued a squad number by Liverpool for the 2005–06 season, with his number 15 being given to new signing Peter Crouch. He joined Portsmouth in August 2005 on a season-long loan, but spent much of the season out injured. At the end of the season, Pompey manager Harry Redknapp decided not to take up the option to sign him permanently because of his injury-proneness. In July 2006, Diao was taken on trial by Premiership side Charlton Athletic. He failed a medical at the club, thus ending his chances of signing.

=== Stoke City ===
On 10 October 2006, Diao joined Stoke City on loan. He made his debut for Stoke four days later in a 4–0 win away at Leeds United. He became a consistent player for Stoke, holding the team together, slowing down the tempo and speed of the game. It is thought that the revival of Stoke City during the 2006–07 season was in a large part due to Diao's hard-working performances. On 25 January 2007, his contract at Stoke was extended until the end of the season. At the end of the 2006–07 season, Diao was released by Liverpool and was expected to sign for Stoke, but did not sign a deal with the club because he was worried about his fitness levels.

He eventually signed permanently for Stoke on a one-and-a-half-year deal in December 2007. Diao put in some decent performances for Stoke, including games against former club Liverpool and man of the match performances against Chelsea and Sunderland. In June 2009, he was offered a new one-year contract to stay at the Britannia Stadium, which he accepted. He scored his first goal for the club in an away win at Portsmouth in February 2010. It was only Diao's second ever league goal, with his first coming six years before.

"I didn't know he'd scored the goal until I got back in the dressing room. I couldn't believe it, I'll have to watch it on television to believe it."

— Stoke manager Tony Pulis in shock over Diao's goal.

Diao left Stoke after he rejected a new contract, which would have given a joint role as a club ambassador and player. However, Diao changed his mind and agreed to sign a new contract with Stoke. During the 2010–11 season, Diao played eleven times for Stoke and was an unused substitute in the 2011 FA Cup Final. In the 2011–12 season, Diao was used sparingly by Pulis, with Diao playing mostly in the UEFA Europa League; he left the club at the end of the 2011–12 season, after turning down a coaching role.

== International career ==
Diao has appeared 39 times for Senegal, scoring four goals in the process since 2000, including a strike against Denmark at the 2002 FIFA World Cup after a series of quick passes by his teammates to set him up. He was later sent off in the same match for a high tackle. Diao was in the Senegal squad that went to the 2002 African Cup of Nations where Senegal finished second after losing in the final to Cameroon and was part of the Senegal side that went to the 2004 African Cup of Nations.

He was also in the side that reached the quarter-finals of the 2002 FIFA World Cup and played games including their 1–0 win over then current champions France, as well as scoring in their 1–1 draw with Denmark before being sent off which meant he missed their next two games but returned for their quarter final exit to Turkey. He has also been involved in Senegal's qualification campaigns for the past three World Cups in 2002, 2006 and 2010. After Senegal failed to qualify for the 2010 World Cup Senegal fans went on a rampage, Diao, along with Stoke City team-mates Abdoulaye Faye and Ibrahima Sonko, were caught up in crowd trouble in Dakar.

== Personal life ==
Diao a founder of non-profit organisation, Sport4Charity. He is also involved with Caap-Afrika.

== Post-retirement ==
In 2015, Diao began taking his coaching badges, working at the Liverpool Academy while doing so.

== Career statistics ==
=== Club ===
Appearances and goals by club, season and competition
Club	Season	League			FA Cup		League Cup		Europe		Total	
Club	Season	Division	Apps	Goals	Apps	Goals	Apps	Goals	Apps	Goals	Apps	Goals
Monaco	1996–97	Division 1	0	0	0	0	0	0	0	0	0	0
Monaco	1997–98	Division 1	12	0	0	0	0	0	0	0	12	0
Monaco	1998–99	Division 1	14	0	0	0	0	0	3	0	17	0
Monaco	1999–2000	Division 1	1	0	0	0	0	0	1	0	2	0
Monaco	Total		27	0	0	0	0	0	4	0	31	0
Épinal (loan)	1996–97	Division 2	2	0	0	0	0	0	—		2	0
Sedan	2000–01	Division 1	27	0	1	0	1	0	3	0	32	0
Sedan	2001–02	Division 1	22	0	1	0	0	0	2	0	25	0
Sedan	Total		49	0	2	0	1	0	5	0	57	0
Liverpool	2002–03	Premier League	26	1	2	0	4	0	8	1	40	2
Liverpool	2003–04	Premier League	3	0	0	0	1	0	3	0	7	0
Liverpool	2004–05	Premier League	8	0	0	0	3	1	3	0	14	1
Liverpool	Total		37	1	2	0	8	1	14	1	61	3
Birmingham City (loan)	2004–05	Premier League	2	0	0	0	0	0	—		2	0
Portsmouth (loan)	2005–06	Premier League	11	0	1	0	0	0	—		12	0
Stoke City	2006–07	Championship	27	0	2	0	0	0	—		29	0
Stoke City	2007–08	Championship	11	0	1	0	0	0	—		12	0
Stoke City	2008–09	Premier League	20	0	0	0	1	0	—		21	0
Stoke City	2009–10	Premier League	16	1	3	0	0	0	—		19	1
Stoke City	2010–11	Premier League	8	0	2	0	1	0	—		11	0
Stoke City	2011–12	Premier League	6	0	0	0	1	0	7	0	14	0
Stoke City	Total		88	1	8	0	3	0	7	0	106	1
Career total			216	2	13	0	12	1	30	1	271	4

=== International ===
Appearances and goals by national team and year
National team	Year	Apps	Goals
Senegal	2001	8	0
Senegal	2002	13	3
Senegal	2003	7	1
Senegal	2004	9	0
Senegal	2009	2	0
Total		39	4

Scores and results list Senegal's goal tally first, score column indicates score after each Diao goal.

List of international goals scored by Salif Diao
No	Date	Venue	Opponent	Score	Result	Competition
1.	4 February 2002	Stade Modibo Kéïta, Bamako, Mali	DR Congo	1–0	2–0	2002 Africa Cup of Nations
2.	7 February 2002	Stade Modibo Kéïta, Bamako, Mali	Nigeria	2–1	2–1 (a.e.t.)	2002 Africa Cup of Nations
3.	6 June 2002	Daegu World Cup Stadium, Daegu, South Korea	Denmark	1–1	1–1	2002 FIFA World Cup
4.	31 May 2003	Stade Léopold Sédar Senghor, Dakar, Senegal	Cape Verde	2–1	2–1	Friendly

== Honours ==
Monaco

- Division 1: 1999–2000
- Trophée des Champions: 1997–98

Liverpool

- Football League Cup: 2002–03

Stoke City

- Football League Championship runner-up: 2007–08
- FA Cup runner-up: 2010–11

Senegal

- Africa Cup of Nations runner-up:2002
