= 2006–07 FC Utrecht season =

FC Utrecht
2006–07 season
- Manager: Foeke Booy
- Eredivisie: 9th
- KNVB Cup: Quarter final

The 2006–07 season saw FC Utrecht's compete in the Eredivise where they finished in 9th position with 48 points. They entered the end of season play-offs where they won the UEFA Intertoto Cup ticket after beating Vitesse Arnhem.

== Final league table ==
Pos	Team	Pld	W	D	L	GF	GA	GD	Pts	Qualification or relegation
7	Feyenoord	34	15	8	11	56	66	−10	53	Qualification to UEFA Cup first round playoff
8	Groningen	34	15	6	13	54	54	0	51	Qualification to UEFA Cup first round playoff
9	Utrecht	34	13	9	12	41	44	−3	48	Qualification to UEFA Cup first round playoff
10	NEC	34	12	8	14	36	44	−8	44	Qualification to Intertoto Cup third round playoff
11	NAC Breda	34	12	7	15	43	54	−11	43	Qualification to Intertoto Cup third round playoff

Rules for classification: 1) points; 2) goal difference; 3) number of goals scored.

== Results ==
=== Legend ===
Win	Draw	Loss

=== Eredivisie ===
Match	Date	Opponent	Venue	Result	Attendance	Scorers
1	19 August 2006	Willem II	A	1 – 2	11,300	Fortuné 2'
2	26 August 2006	Sparta Rotterdam	H	2 – 2	19,000	Caluwé (2) 25', 45'
3	10 September 2006	RKC Waalwijk	H	5 – 0	19,000	Fortuné 15', Kopteff (2) 19', 41', Cornelisse 43'
4	16 September 2006	Heracles Almelo	A	0 – 3	8,500	
5	24 September 2006	Heerenveen	H	1 – 0	19,000	van Dijk 90'
6	1 October 2006	Ajax	H	2 – 3	24,000	van Dijk 80', Fortuné 85'
7	15 October 2006	Excelsior	A	1 – 0	2,835	van der Gun 45'
8	22 October 2006	ADO Den Haag	H	2 – 0	20,000	Kruys 37', van der Gun 37'
9	26 October 2006	NAC Breda	A	1 – 2	14,834	Fortuné 50'
10	29 October 2006	AZ	A	1 – 5	15,297	Fortuné 90'
11	2 November 2006	Twente	H	0 – 0	19,700	
12	12 November 2006	Vitesse Arnhem	A	2 – 4	17,850	Kopteff 71', Nelisse 76'
13	19 November 2006	Roda JC	H	2 – 0	17,250	Kruys 25', van Dijk 69'
14	25 November 2006	PSV Eindhoven	A	0 – 5	33,114	
15	3 December 2006	Groningen	H	3 – 0	20,000	Keller 4', van der Gun (2) 32', 52'
16	9 December 2006	NEC	A	0 – 2	12,000	
17	17 December 2006	Feyenoord	H	2 – 1	21,750	van Dijk 9', Nelisse 17'
18	24 December 2006	RKC Waalwijk	A	1 – 1	5,000	Caluwé 24'
19	27 December 2006	Heracles Almelo	H	0 – 0	19,500	
20	27 December 2006	Heerenveen	A	0 – 0	25,200	
21	21 January 2007	Ajax	A	0 – 2	44,940	
22	27 January 2007	Excelsior	H	1 – 0	18,500	Somers 42'
23	4 February 2007	ADO Den Haag	A	1 – 1	7,160	Caluwé 17'
24	11 February 2007	NAC Breda	H	1 – 0	18,750	Kopteff 76'
25	18 February 2007	Feyenoord	A	0 – 2	38,000	
26	23 February 2007	NEC	H	3 – 0	19,000	Somers 45', Rossini 48', Caluwé 63'
27	4 March 2007	AZ	H	0 – 4	19,000	
28	9 March 2007	Roda JC	A	0 – 0	13,823	
29	18 March 2007	Vitesse Arnhem	H	2 – 0	21,400	Dickoh 20', Caluwé 51'
30	1 April 2007	Twente	A	0 – 3	13,350	
31	8 April 2007	Willem II	H	3 – 0	21,230	Caluwé 14', Somers 29', Cornelisse 66'
32	13 April 2007	Sparta Rotterdam	A	1 – 1	10,000	George 68'
33	22 April 2007	PSV Eindhoven	H	1 – 1	23,000	Schut 86'
34	29 April 2007	Groningen	A	2 – 0	19,500	Loval 6', Keller 33'

=== UEFA Cup play-offs ===
Match	Date	Opponent	Venue	Result	Attendance	Scorers
1	9 May 2007	Roda JC	H	0 – 0	12,500	
2	12 May 2007	Roda JC	A	1 – 1	14,521	Cornelisse 38'
3	17 May 2007	Groningen	H	0 – 2	15,500	
4	20 May 2007	Groningen	A	1 – 2	19,345	van Dijk 79'

=== UEFA Intertoto Cup play-off ===
Match	Date	Opponent	Venue	Result	Attendance	Scorers
1	24 May 2007	Vitesse Arnhem	A	2 – 2	8,750	Rossini 64', Loval 67'
2	27 May 2007	Vitesse Arnhem	H	0 – 0	13,500	

=== KNVB Cup ===
Round	Date	Opponent	Venue	Result	Attendance	Scorers
R1	19 September 2006	AGOVV Apeldoorn	H	3 – 1	5,500	Fortuné 14', Caluwé 43', Dickoh 71'
R2	9 November 2006	Rijnsburgse Boys	H	5 – 0	5,000	van Dijk 37', Kruys 71', Nelisse (2) 73', 78', Fortuné 75'
R3	24 January 2007	RBC Roosendaal	H	1 – 0	7,100	Kruys 68'
QF	28 February 2007	AZ	H	1 – 2	14,500	Loval 54'

== Squad statistics ==
No.	Pos.	Name	Eredivisie		KNVB Cup		Play-offs		Total	
No.	Pos.	Name	Apps	Goals	Apps	Goals	Apps	Goals	Apps	Goals
1	GK	(Netherlands) Joost Terol	0	0	0	0	0	0	0	0
2	DF	(Netherlands) Tim Cornelisse	29	3	4	0	5	1	38	4
3	DF	(Netherlands) Leen van Steensel	1	0	0	0	0	0	1	0
5	DF	(Netherlands) Etienne Shew-Atjon	0	0	1	0	0	0	1	0
6	MF	(Netherlands) Jean-Paul de Jong	21	0	2	0	3	0	26	0
7	MF	(Netherlands) Darl Douglas	11	0	1	0	0	0	12	0
7	MF	(Morocco) Ali Boussaboun	4	0	1	0	6	0	11	0
8	DF	(Netherlands) Joost Broerse	28	0	4	0	3	0	35	0
9	FW	(Netherlands Antilles) Robin Nelisse	18	2	3	2	3	0	24	4
10	MF	(Belgium) Tom Caluwé	33	7	4	1	6	0	43	8
11	FW	(Netherlands) Cedric van der Gun	18	4	2	0	0	0	20	4
12	MF	(Netherlands) Dwight Tiendalli	1	0	0	0	0	0	1	0
12	MF	(Romania) Lucian Sânmărtean	1	0	0	0	1	0	2	0
13	GK	(Netherlands) Michel Vorm	33	0	4	0	5	0	42	0
14	MF	(Finland) Peter Kopteff	30	4	3	0	3	0	36	4
15	FW	(France) Marc-Antoine Fortuné	22	5	3	2	0	0	25	7
16	GK	(Guadeloupe) Franck Grandel	1	0	0	0	1	0	2	0
17	DF	(Netherlands) Alje Schut	7	1	0	0	6	0	13	1
18	MF	(Netherlands) Gregoor van Dijk	28	4	4	1	6	1	38	6
19	FW	(Italy) Giuseppe Rossini	17	1	1	0	4	1	22	2
20	FW	(Guadeloupe) Loïc Loval	12	1	1	1	6	1	19	3
20	DF	(Netherlands) Edson Braafheid	13	0	2	0	0	0	15	0
21	MF	(Netherlands) Rick Kruys	27	2	4	2	3	0	34	4
22	DF	(Netherlands) Sander Keller	8	2	0	0	5	0	13	2
23	MF	(Belgium) Hans Somers	31	3	3	0	3	0	37	3
24	FW	(Netherlands) Nassir Maachi	2	0	0	0	0	0	2	0
25	DF	(Denmark) Francis Dickoh	29	1	3	1	5	0	37	2
30	MF	(Netherlands) Jasper Bolland	1	0	0	0	0	0	1	0
36	DF	(Netherlands) Erik Pieters	20	0	3	0	6	0	29	0
38	DF	(Netherlands) Ramon Leeuwin	8	2	0	0	5	0	13	2
41	MF	(Netherlands) Leroy George	3	1	0	0	4	0	7	1
