= Erik Pieters =

Dutch footballer and coach (born 1988)

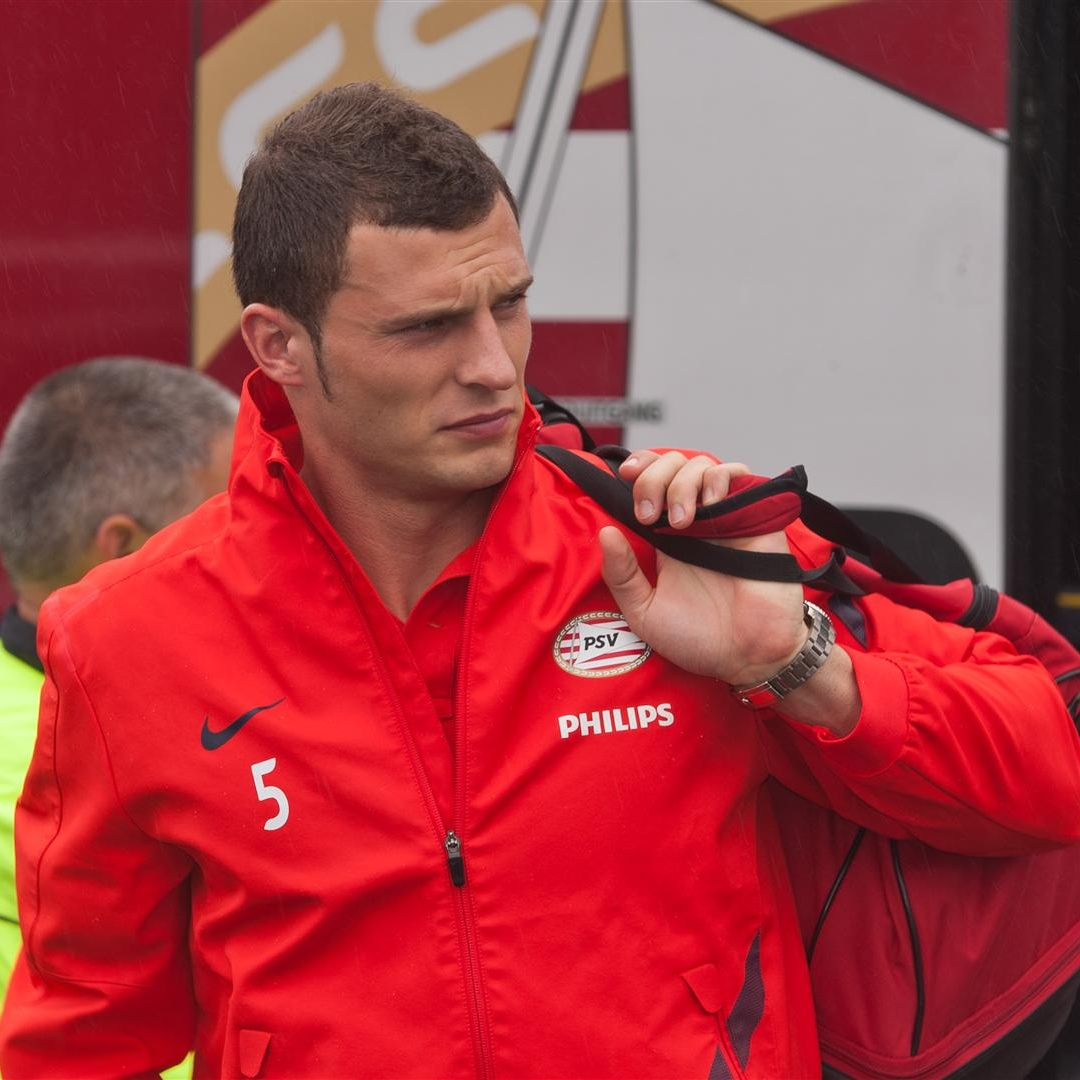
- Pieters with PSV Eindhoven in 2011

Personal information
- Full name: Erik Pieters
- Date of birth: 7 August 1988 (age 38)
- Place of birth: Tiel, Netherlands
- Height: 1.83 m (6 ft 0 in)
- Position: Defender

Team information
- Current team: Stoke City U21s (player-coach)

Youth career
- 2000–2004: VV Rhelico
- 2004–2006: Utrecht

Senior career*
Years	Team	Apps	(Gls)
2006–2008	Utrecht	51	(2)
2008–2013	PSV Eindhoven	93	(0)
2013–2019	Stoke City	190	(3)
2019	→ Amiens (loan)	15	(1)
2019–2022	Burnley	56	(0)
2022–2024	West Bromwich Albion	58	(0)
2024–2025	Luton Town	0	(0)
2025	Derby County	1	(0)
Total		464	(6)

International career
2004–2006	Netherlands U17	5	(0)
2006–2007	Netherlands U19	3	(0)
2007–2010	Netherlands U21	19	(1)
2010–2014	Netherlands	18	(0)
Medal record
Men's football
Representing Netherlands
UEFA European Under-21 Championship
Winner	2007 Netherlands
- * Club domestic league appearances and goals as of 17:13, 3 May 2025 (UTC)

Erik Pieters (Dutch pronunciation: [ˈeːrɪk ˈpitərs]; born 7 August 1988) is a Dutch football coach and former professional footballer who is an Under-21s coach and overage player at EFL Championship club Stoke City, playing as a defender.

Pieters began his career with Utrecht and made his professional debut in August 2006. He impressed enough at the Stadion Galgenwaard to earn a move to PSV Eindhoven in July 2008 for €2.5 million. At PSV, he won the Johan Cruijff Shield in 2008 and the KNVB Beker in 2011–12 and also became a regular member of the Dutch national team. Injuries hampered his progress in 2012–13 before he moved to English side Stoke City in June 2013 for €3.6 million.

Pieters spent six years with Stoke and made 206 appearances before joining Burnley in July 2019. He signed for Championship club West Bromwich Albion in September 2022 for a further two seasons. He had a short term spell at Luton Town without making a first-team appearance prior to moving to Championship side Derby County in late March 2025 in a deal until the end of the season; he left the club in June 2025.

== Career ==
=== Early career ===
Born in Tiel, Pieters grew up in Enspijk and started as a central midfielder in the juvenile ranks of VV Rhelico in Rumpt. There he was scouted by Utrecht and, after a trial period, he joined the Utrecht youth academy.

=== Utrecht ===
Pieters made his Eredivisie debut for Utrecht in a 2–1 defeat against Willem II and went on to make 29 appearances in his maiden season as Utrecht finished the 2006–07 season in ninth place and they went on to win in the Intertoto Cup playoffs. In the 2007–08 season, Pieters made his European debut in July in the Intertoto Cup. He made 35 appearances and scored twice against Willem II and Groningen as Utrecht finished in tenth place. His solid performances attracted the interest of PSV Eindhoven.

=== PSV Eindhoven ===
On 9 July 2008, it was confirmed that Eredivisie champions PSV Eindhoven had signed the left-back for reportedly €2.5 million. Pieters was given the number 14 shirt, which was previously worn by Slobodan Rajković. He made his PSV debut in the league against his former club in a 5–1 win. His UEFA Champions League debut came in September against Atlético Madrid. After a bright start to his PSV career, he was benched after some indifferent performances. In 2008–09 Pieters played 23 times for PSV as they finished in 4th position, winning the 2008 Johan Cruijff Schaal by beating Feyenoord 2–0.

The following season, Pieters regained his place in the starting eleven and played his part as PSV went on an unbeaten run for the last two months leading up to the winter break. His season was interrupted by a knee injury sustained while on international duty and he returned to within two weeks. The 2009–10 campaign saw PSV finish in 3rd position and reach the round of 32 in the UEFA Europa League. Pieters played 48 times in 2010–11 as PSV came close to reclaiming the Dutch title, finishing third four points off champions Ajax and he also helped PSV beat Feynoord 10–0. The 2011–12 season saw Pieters struggle with a fractured metatarsal and played 25 times before deciding to undergo foot surgery.

He made his return from injury in a league match against PEC Zwolle on 18 January 2013 after a nine-month layoff, and with PSV losing 3–1 Pieters was sent-off for a foul on Fred Benson. Such was Pieters' anger that he ran down the players entrance and punched a window, badly cutting his arm and was ruled out for a further three months. He returned in the top-of the table clash with Ajax towards the end of the 2012–13 season, replacing Jetro Willems after 73 minutes. A mix up with Pieters and PSV goalkeeper Boy Waterman allowed Derk Boerrigter to scoring the winning goal and Ajax went on to win the Eredivise.

=== Stoke City ===
Pieters signed for English club Stoke City on 28 June 2013 on a four-year contract for a fee of €3.6 million (£3 million). After agreeing to join Stoke, Pieters revealed that his main ambition was to play in England. – "Of course, I've always wanted to play in the Premier League. It's one of the hardest competitions to play in with some great players and teams and I'm really excited about it. I'm really looking forward to playing for this Club. It's important for me that the first impression is good and I've got a great feeling about Stoke City." He made his debut for Stoke on 17 August 2013 in a 1–0 defeat against Liverpool. Pieters scored his first goal for Stoke on 12 April 2014 in a 1–0 win over Newcastle United after his intended cross beat Tim Krul. Pieters played 39 times for Stoke in 2013–14 as they finished in ninth position in the Premier League.

Pieters retained his place at left-back under Mark Hughes in 2014–15, playing in 32 matches as Stoke finished in ninth position. Stoke suffered a number of defensive injuries during the season with Pieters suffering from a groin injury. Stoke ended the campaign with a 6–1 victory against Liverpool. Pieters signed a contract extension in December 2015, keeping him contracted at the club until 2020. Pieters played 41 times for Stoke in 2015–16 as the Potters again finished ninth. At the end of the season Opta Sports revealed that Pieters made more tackles than any other defender in the Premier League during the campaign.

Pieters again remained Hughes' first choice left-back in 2016–17, making 38 appearances as Stoke finished in 13th position. Pieters was criticised at times during the campaign by supporters due to some poor performances and assistant manager Mark Bowen admitted that Pieters "has come off his standards". Pieters was fined £70,000 by manager Paul Lambert in March 2018 after attending a late night party just hours before a league fixture against Everton. Pieters played 32 times in 2017–18 as Stoke suffered relegation to the EFL Championship. Pieters began the 2018–19 season with two rare goals against Preston North End and West Bromwich Albion.

On 31 January 2019, Pieters joined French club Amiens on loan for the remainder of the 2018–19 season. Pieters played 15 times for Amiens, helping them to avoid relegation.

=== Burnley ===
On 8 July 2019, Pieters signed for Burnley for an undisclosed fee. On 10 June 2022, Burnley announced Pieters would leave the club at the end of June when his contract expired.

=== West Bromwich Albion ===
On 13 September 2022, Pieters joined EFL Championship club West Bromwich Albion on a free transfer, signing a deal until the end of the season. He made his Albion debut the following day, coming on as a substitute in a home defeat to Birmingham City. On 22 May 2024, the club announced he would be leaving in the summer when his contract expired.

=== Luton Town ===
On 19 December 2024, Pieters joined Championship side Luton Town on a short-term deal. He left the club on 19 January 2025, without making an appearance.

On 7 March 2025, it was reported Pieters was training with Championship club Middlesbrough; however, the club opted not to sign him.

=== Derby County ===
On 28 March 2025, Pieters signed a contract with Derby County of the Championship on a short-term deal until the end of the 2024–25 season. Pieters spent the majority of his time at Derby as an unused substitute, making his debut for the club as a 89th-minute substitute for Craig Forsyth in Derby's last game of the season on 3 May 2025, against former club Stoke City.

On 16 May 2025; it was announced by Derby County that Pieters would leave Derby County upon the expiry of his contract in June 2025.

== International career ==
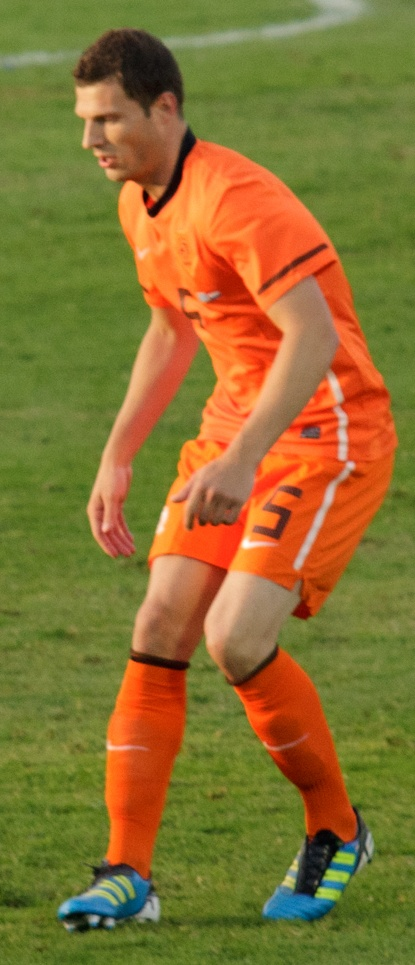
Pieters in action for the Netherlands national team in 2011

Pieters played five matches for the Netherlands at the 2005 FIFA U-17 World Championship where they reached the semi-finals. In 2007 Pieters was called up by Netherlands U-21 coach Foppe de Haan to be part of his squad for the 2007 UEFA European Under-21 Football Championship held in the Netherlands. Pieters did not play in their first round group match against Israel (1–0 win), but did come on as a substitute in the second match against Portugal (2–1 win) to secure a semi-final spot and to qualify for the 2008 Summer Olympics.

In the semi-finals against England (1–1, 13–12 after 32 penalty kicks), Pieters played in the starting eleven, but was later substituted by Tim Janssen to improve the attack as well as due to a small injury. Pieters returned on the pitch and the Dutch went on to retain their 2006 title by beating Serbia 4–1 in the final. On 7 May 2012, Pieters was named in the provisional list of 36 players for the Euro 2012 tournament, but he did not recover in time for the competition due to a foot injury. PSV team member Jetro Willems replaced him in the Euro 2012 squad.

== Style of play ==
Pieters' natural position is at left-back and describes himself as an attacking full-back and is also capable of playing as a centre-back if required. "My first job is to defend but I always want to attack and contribute as much as I can for the team. I've played a couple of times in the centre of defence as well but left-back is my position."

== Coaching career ==
In July 2026, Pieters joined old club Stoke City U21s team as a professional development coach and also as an overage player.

== Career statistics ==
=== Club ===
As of match played 3 May 2025

Appearances and goals by club, season and competition
Club	Season	League			National cup (Note: Includes KNVB Cup and FA Cup)		League cup (Note: Includes EFL Cup)		Europe		Other		Total	
Club	Season	Division	Apps	Goals	Apps	Goals	Apps	Goals	Apps	Goals	Apps	Goals	Apps	Goals
Utrecht	2006–07	Eredivisie	20	0	3	0	—		—		6 (Note: Appearances in Eredivisie European playoffs)	0	29	0
Utrecht	2007–08	Eredivisie	31	2	1	0	—		1 (Note: Appearance in UEFA Intertoto Cup)	0	2	0	35	2
Utrecht	Total		51	2	4	0	0	0	1	0	8	0	64	2
PSV Eindhoven	2008–09	Eredivisie	17	0	2	0	—		3 (Note: Appearances in UEFA Champions League)	0	1 (Note: Appearance in 2008 Johan Cruyff Shield)	0	23	0
PSV Eindhoven	2009–10	Eredivisie	27	0	4	0	—		11 (Note: Appearances in UEFA Europa League)	0	—		42	0
PSV Eindhoven	2010–11	Eredivisie	31	0	4	0	—		13	0	—		48	0
PSV Eindhoven	2011–12	Eredivisie	16	0	2	0	—		7	0	—		25	0
PSV Eindhoven	2012–13	Eredivisie	2	0	0	0	—		0	0	—		2	0
PSV Eindhoven	Total		93	0	12	0	0	0	34	0	1	0	140	0
Stoke City	2013–14	Premier League	36	1	2	0	1	0	—		—		39	1
Stoke City	2014–15	Premier League	31	0	0	0	1	0	—		—		32	0
Stoke City	2015–16	Premier League	35	0	1	0	5	0	—		—		41	0
Stoke City	2016–17	Premier League	36	0	1	0	2	0	—		—		39	0
Stoke City	2017–18	Premier League	31	0	0	0	1	0	—		—		32	0
Stoke City	2018–19	Championship	21	2	1	0	1	0	—		—		23	2
Stoke City	Total		190	3	5	0	11	0	0	0	0	0	206	3
Amiens (loan)	2018–19	Ligue 1	15	1	—		—		—		—		15	1
Burnley	2019–20	Premier League	24	0	2	2	0	0	—		—		26	2
Burnley	2020–21	Premier League	20	0	2	0	3	0	—		—		25	0
Burnley	2021–22	Premier League	12	0	0	0	3	0	—		—		15	0
Burnley	Total		56	0	4	2	6	0	0	0	0	0	66	2
West Bromwich Albion	2022–23	Championship	36	0	0	0	0	0	—		—		36	0
West Bromwich Albion	2023–24	Championship	22	0	2	0	1	0	—		—		25	0
West Bromwich Albion	Total		58	0	2	0	1	0	0	0	0	0	61	0
Luton Town	2024–25	Championship	0	0	0	0	—		—		—		0	0
Derby County	2024–25	Championship	1	0	—		—		—		—		1	0
Career total			464	6	27	2	18	0	35	0	9	0	553	8

=== International ===
As of match played 4 September 2014

Appearances and goals by national team and year
National team	Year	Apps	Goals
Netherlands
Netherlands	2010	5	0
Netherlands	2011	9	0
Netherlands	2012	1	0
Netherlands	2013	2	0
Netherlands	2014	1	0
Total		18	0

== Honours ==
PSV Eindhoven

- KNVB Cup: 2011–12
- Johan Cruijff Shield: 2008

Netherlands U17

- FIFA U-17 World Cup Third place: 2005

Netherlands U21

- UEFA U-21 Championship: 2007
