= Oussama Assaidi =

Moroccan footballer (born 1988)

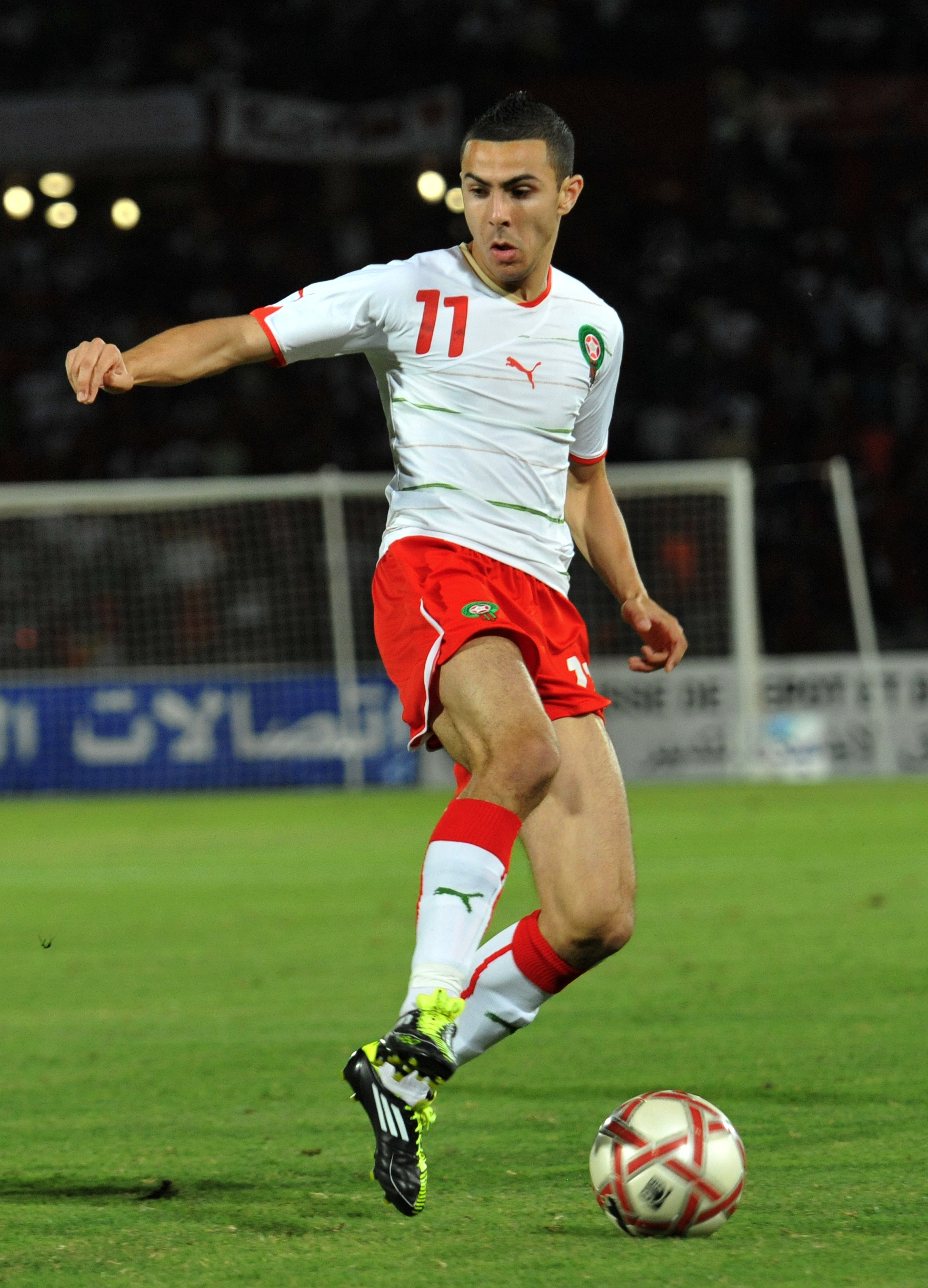
- Assaidi playing for Morocco in 2011

Personal information
- Full name: Oussama Assaidi
- Date of birth: 15 August 1988 (age 38)
- Place of birth: Ait Bouyafar, Morocco
- Height: 1.77 m (5 ft 10 in)
- Position: Winger

Youth career
- 2003–2006: AZ

Senior career*
Years	Team	Apps	(Gls)
2006–2008	Omniworld	36	(3)
2008–2009	De Graafschap	17	(6)
2009–2012	Heerenveen	79	(20)
2012–2015	Liverpool	4	(0)
2013–2015	→ Stoke City (loan)	28	(4)
2015–2016	Al-Ahli Dubai	14	(3)
2017	Jong FC Twente	1	(0)
2017–2019	Twente	41	(7)
Total		228	(46)

International career
2011–2015	Morocco	17	(2)
- * Club domestic league appearances and goals

Oussama Assaidi (Berber languages: ⵓⵙⴰⵎⴰ ⴰⵙⴰⵄⵉⴷⵉ; Arabic: أسامة السعيدي; born 15 August 1988) is a Moroccan former footballer who played as a winger.

Assaidi began his career in the Netherlands with AZ. After failing to earn a contract with AZ, he played with second tier club FC Omniworld and then De Graafschap before joining Heerenveen in 2009. His performances at the Abe Lenstra Stadion earned him international recognition with the Morocco national team and also attracted the attention of bigger European clubs. Assaidi signed with English Premier League side Liverpool in August 2012 for a fee of £2.4 million. He struggled to break into the first team at Anfield, however, and joined Stoke City on loan for the 2013–14 and 2014–15 seasons, before being sold to Al-Ahli Dubai in January 2015.

A full international since 2011, Assaidi represented Morocco at the Africa Cup of Nations in 2012 and 2013.

== Club career ==
=== Early career ===
Assaidi was born in Beni-Boughafer, in northern Morocco, before his family moved to Amsterdam. He began his career with the AZ academy where he spent three years before leaving in 2006 to begin his professional career at Omniworld in the Eerste Divisie. After two seasons with the club from Almere, where he scored 3 goals in 36 games, he moved to De Graafschap to play in the Eredivisie, the top flight of Dutch football, in the summer of 2008. Assaidi spent just one year with the club before moving to Heerenveen on the last day of the transfer window. The move was seen as surprising because Heerenveen had said that they were not planning to buy any new players, but Assaidi's performance at the beginning of the 2009–10 Eredivisie, scoring five goals in five games, meant that an exception was made to bring Assaidi to the club.

=== Heerenveen ===
Assaidi made his Heerenveen debut in a 1–0 loss at home to arch-rivals Groningen, where he came on in the 71st minute as a substitute for Paulo Henrique. He also scored his first goal for Heerenveen in the second round of the KNVB Cup in a 7–0 away win against SDC Putten. After coming off the bench in the next three league games, Assaidi was given his first place in the starting line-up for in an away match against Willem II, which Heerenveen lost 4–1. Assaidi's first league goal for Heerenveen came in a 3–1 defeat to Heracles, which was also the first game where he played the full 90 minutes for the club. Assaidi lost his starting place towards the end of the season, with only 2 starts in the last 14 games of the season. During this period, Assaidi received the first red card of his career in an away match against Roda JC, after just nine minutes.

Under new manager Ron Jans, Assaidi became a key figure in the side. With two goals against his old club De Graafschap and Vitesse, combined with two assists against De Graafschap and NAC Breda, Assaidi was responsible for four goals in the first six games, the same number of goals that he created in his whole previous season. Assaidi had his best month in November 2010, when he scored in a 2–0 win against Excelsior, and delivered two assists against Heracles (3–2), 1 against Feyenoord (2–2) and 2 against Willem II (5–0). In December, Assaidi displayed a Man of the Match performance in a home match against defending champions Twente, where, despite an ankle injury, Assaidi led Heerenveen to a 6–2 win over the champions by scoring the first hat-trick of his career, whilst also delivering two assists and winning a penalty. After the match, he was applauded for his performance by Jans, who said that Assaidi deserved a "10 out of 10 for his play". His performances would later be rewarded with a first international call-up by Morocco national team head coach Erik Gerets for a friendly against Niger.

=== Liverpool ===
On 17 August 2012, English Premier League side Liverpool agreed a deal to sign Assaidi for an undisclosed fee thought to be in the region of £2.4 million. Liverpool manager Brendan Rodgers hailed the deal, saying that he was "delighted", and described Assaidi as "an exciting player...that will excite the crowd". He made his debut on 20 September against Young Boys in a 5–3 UEFA Europa League win, before registering an assist in a 2–1 win over West Bromwich Albion in the League Cup six days later. Due to impressive performances from young fellow wingers Raheem Sterling and Suso, however, Assaidi failed to break through to Liverpool's regular starting line-up, making 12 appearances in 2012–13 of which four were in the league.

==== Loans to Stoke City ====
On 27 August 2013, Assaidi joined Stoke City on loan for the 2013–14 season. Speaking after joining Stoke, Assaidi revealed that he turned down other Premier League clubs after he held positive talks with Stoke manager Mark Hughes. He made his debut for Stoke in a 3–1 victory over Walsall in the League Cup on 31 August 2013. He played in the next round of the League Cup Tranmere Rovers after coming on as a 61st-minute substitute, he provided an assist for Peter Crouch to secure a 2–0 victory. He made his Premier League debut for Stoke on 5 October 2013, coming on as a 63rd-minute substitute in a 1–0 defeat against Fulham.

Assaidi scored his first goal for Stoke in a League Cup match against Birmingham City on 29 October 2013. On 7 December, he scored the winning goal in a 3–2 victory against Chelsea, which was Stoke's first league win over the Blues since 1975. Assaidi scored a similar goal against Newcastle United on 26 December and also found the net against Everton on 1 January 2014. On 20 February, it was revealed that Assaidi suffered ligament damage during a club training camp in Dubai, ruling him out for up to six weeks. Upon returning from injury Assaidi scored in a 4–1 win against Fulham on 3 May 2014. Stoke manager Mark Hughes admitted that he would like to sign Assaidi on a permanent basis. Stoke, however, was unhappy with Liverpool's asking price.

On 1 September 2014, Assaidi re-joined Stoke City on loan for the 2014–15 season. After making 11 appearances for Stoke, eight as a substitute, he was recalled by Liverpool in January 2015.

=== Al-Ahli Dubai ===
On his return to Liverpool, Assaidi was sold to UAE Arabian Gulf League side Al-Ahli Dubai for a fee reported to be in the region of £4.7 million. He made 14 appearances (six starts) in the 2015 AFC Champions League, in which his team lost the final 1–0 on aggregate to Guangzhou Evergrande.

On 15 November 2016, Assaidi was released by the club. Assaidi later admitted that he only signed for the club due to the salary, and that he was ready to return to the Premier League.

=== Twente and Retirement ===
On 24 December 2016, Assaidi returned to the Dutch Eredivisie after signing a two-and-a-half-year deal with Twente.

Assaidi departed Twente at the end of the 2018–19 season, he then started his own sports gym in Morocco called “PlayersHome” with Kamal El Makrini.

== International career ==
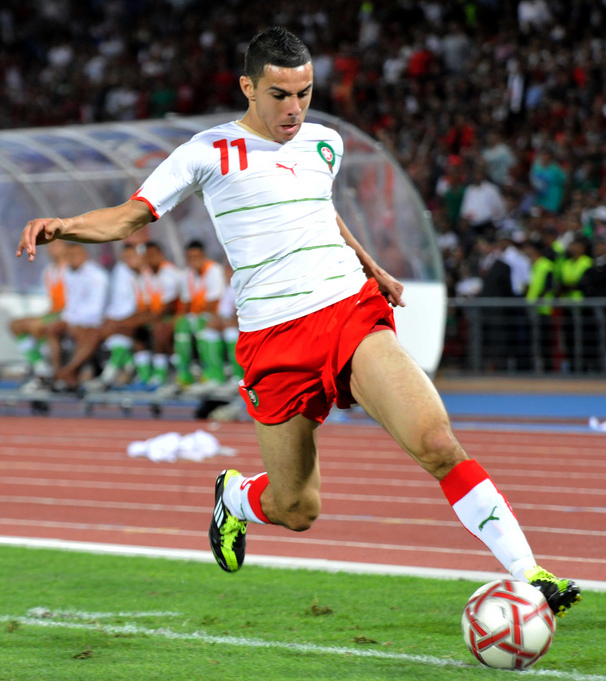
Assaidi playing for Morocco against Algeria in 2011.

Assaidi was eligible to play for both the Netherlands or Morocco. His first invitation for a senior team came in February 2011, when Morocco national team coach Eric Gerets called him up for Morocco's friendly match against Niger. Assaidi made his debut in Morocco's 4–0 win over Niger, coming on as a substitute in the 77th minute for Adel Taarabt. Since it was a friendly, however, Assaidi was still eligible to play for the Netherlands. He announced on 14 February 2011 that his choice for Morocco was definite.

Assaidi scored his first Morocco goal on 4 June 2011 in a 4–0 2012 Africa Cup of Nations qualifier win against Algeria. In the final tournament in Gabon and Equatorial Guinea, he started Morocco's opening game at the Stade d'Angondjé in Libreville, being replaced by Adel Taarabt at half-time in a 2–1 loss to rivals Tunisia. He took no further part as Morocco were eliminated from their group. Assaidi started two games in the next year's edition of the tournament in South Africa, where his team fell at the same hurdle.

On 16 November 2014, Assaidi scored his first international goal for over three years, a long-range equaliser in a 2–1 friendly win over Zimbabwe.

== Career statistics ==
=== Club ===
Appearances and goals by club, season and competition
Club	Season	League			Cup		League Cup		Europe		Other^{[A]}		Total	
Club	Season	Division	Apps	Goals	Apps	Goals	Apps	Goals	Apps	Goals	Apps	Goals	Apps	Goals
Omniworld	2006–07	Eerste Divisie	7	0	0	0	—		—		—		7	0
Omniworld	2007–08	Eerste Divisie	29	3	0	0	—		—		—		29	3
Omniworld	Total		36	3	0	0	—		—		—		36	3
De Graafschap	2008–09	Eredivisie	12	1	1	0	—		—		4	1	17	2
De Graafschap	2009–10	Eerste Divisie	5	5	0	0	—		—		—		5	5
De Graafschap	Total		17	6	1	0	—		—		4	1	22	7
Heerenveen	2009–10	Eredivisie	20	1	3	1	—		6	1	0	0	29	3
Heerenveen	2010–11	Eredivisie	31	9	2	0	—		0	0	—		33	9
Heerenveen	2011–12	Eredivisie	27	10	2	0	—		0	0	—		29	10
Heerenveen	2012–13	Eredivisie	1	0	0	0	—		1	0	0	0	2	0
Heerenveen	Total		79	20	7	1	—		7	1	0	0	93	22
Liverpool	2012–13	Premier League	4	0	0	0	2	0	6	0	—		12	0
Stoke City (loan)	2013–14	Premier League	19	4	2	0	4	1	—		—		25	5
Stoke City (loan)	2014–15	Premier League	9	0	1	0	1	0	—		—		11	0
Stoke City (loan)	Total		28	4	3	0	5	1	0	0	0	0	36	5
Al-Ahli Dubai	2014–15	UAE Arabian Gulf League	13	3	1	0	—		—		14	0	28	3
Al-Ahli Dubai	2015–16	UAE Arabian Gulf League	1	0	0	0	—		—		—		1	0
Al-Ahli Dubai	Total		14	3	1	0	0	0	0	0	0	0	29	3
Jong FC Twente	2016–17	Tweede Divisie	1	0	—		—		—		—		1	0
Twente	2016–17	Eredivisie	5	1	0	0	—		—		—		5	1
Twente	2017–18	Eredivisie	25	6	4	2	—		—		—		29	8
Twente	2018–19	Eerste Divisie	11	0	0	0	—		—		—		11	0
Twente	Total		41	7	4	2	0	0	0	0	0	0	45	9
Career total			220	43	16	3	7	1	13	1	18	1	274	49

A. The "Other" column constitutes appearances and goals in the AFC Champions League and Eredivisie play-offs.

=== International ===
Appearances and goals by national team and year
National team	Year	Apps	Goals
Morocco
Morocco	2011	7	1
Morocco	2012	2	0
Morocco	2013	4	0
Morocco	2014	2	1
Morocco	2015	2	0
Total		17	2

=== International goals ===
Scores and results list Morocco's goal tally first.

#	Date	Venue	Opponent	Score	Result	Competition	Ref
1.	4 June 2011	Stade de Marrakech, Marrakesh	Algeria	4–0	4–0	2012 Africa Cup of Nations qualifier	
2.	16 November 2014	Stade Adrar, Agadir	Zimbabwe	1–1	2–1	Friendly	
