= Sander Keller =

Dutch footballer and coach (born 1979)

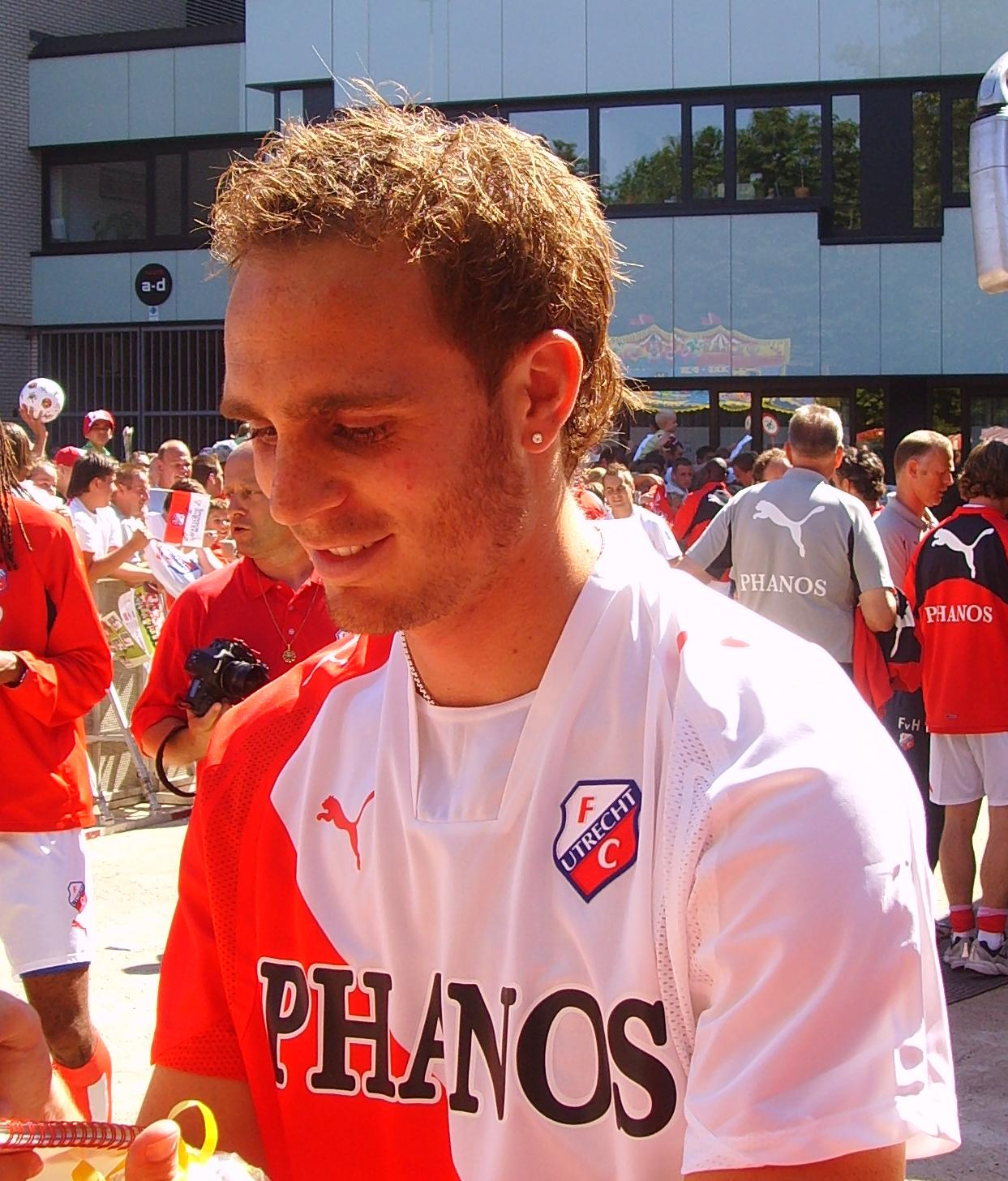
- Keller with Utrecht in 2007

Personal information
- Date of birth: 18 September 1979 (age 47)
- Place of birth: Amsterdam, Netherlands
- Height: 1.83 m (6 ft 0 in)
- Position: Centre-back

Team information
- Current team: Utrecht (assistant)

Youth career
- 1985–1992: Zeeburgia
- 1992–1999: Ajax

Senior career*
Years	Team	Apps	(Gls)
1999–2000	Utrecht	1	(0)
2000–2003	RBC Roosendaal	77	(3)
2003–2010	Utrecht	198	(16)
2010–2012	Neuchâtel Xamax	16	(3)
2012–2015	Almere City	53	(6)
2015–2016	De Meern	12	(2)
- * Club domestic league appearances and goals

Sander Keller (born 18 September 1979) is a Dutch football coach and former footballer. He played as a defender for Utrecht, RBC Roosendaal, Neuchâtel Xamax and Almere City. He is currently an assistant coach at Utrecht.

== Playing career ==
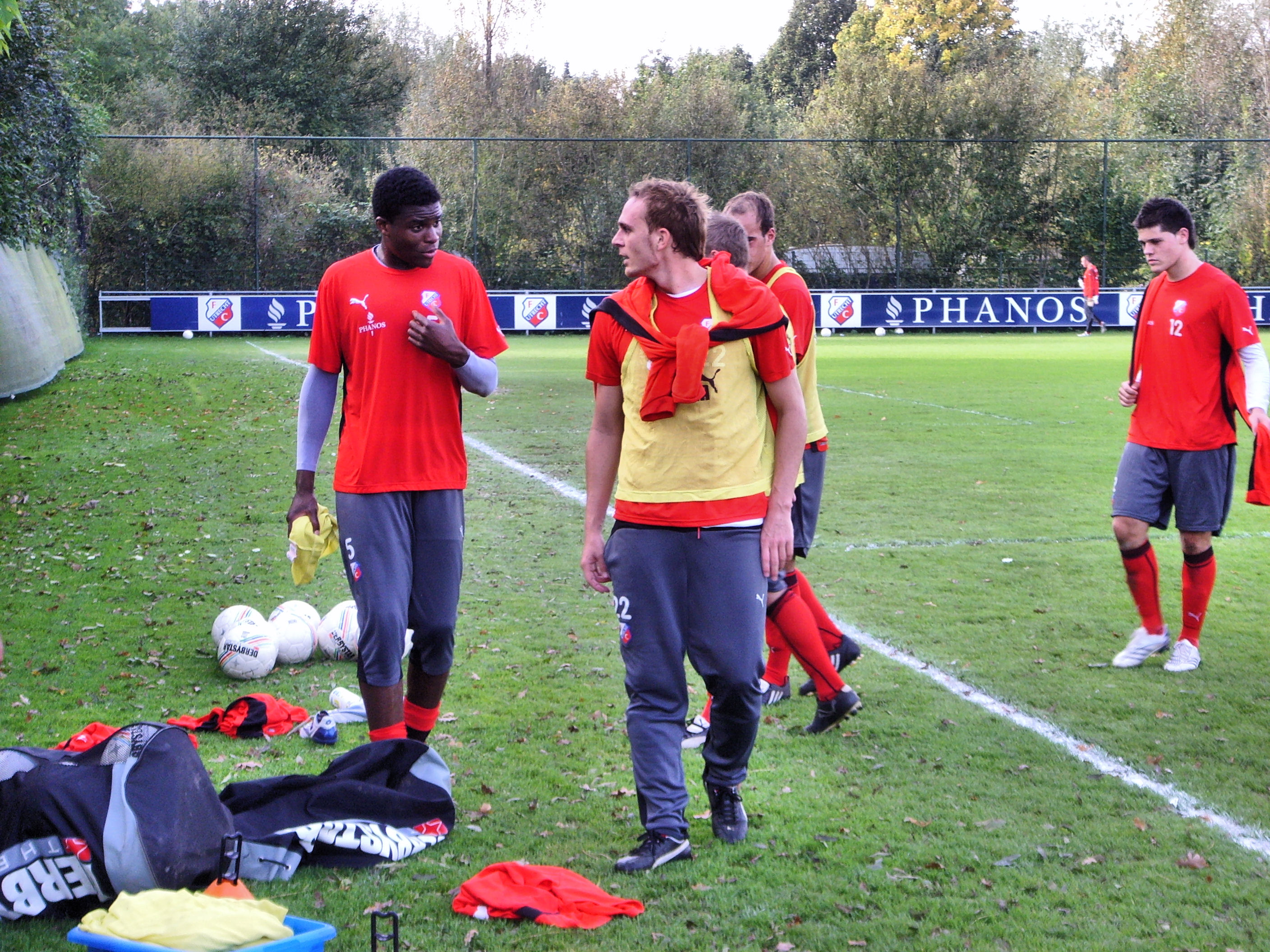
Francis Dickoh and Sander Keller during a practice session with Utrecht.

Born in Amsterdam, Keller began his career at his local club, Zeeburgia, at the age of six. He played regularly for the team before being spotted by Ajax youth scouts. He was then offered a place in the Ajax Academy a year later, and started practicing with the club.

In 1999, Keller wanted to play more matches, and therefore he joined Utrecht. There, he only made one appearance, and therefore joined RBC Roosendaal, where he played 25 matches in his first season, but he could not prevent the club from suffering relegation. Eventually, he would make 77 appearances for RBC, before moving returning to Utrecht.

In Utrecht, he now played often in the Utrecht defense. In Utrecht, Keller enjoyed many successful years, including winning the KNVB Beker once and playing six UEFA Cup matches. In the 2006–07 season, Keller could not count on a place in the starting eleven. Therefore, he went on a look for a new club. He did not find any, and the following summer he renewed his contract until 2010. Since the 2007–08 season, he played regularly and became a stable defender.

Keller signed a one-and-a-half-year contract with Swiss side Neuchâtel Xamax on 11 January 2011. On 2 January 2012, Keller was to sign a loan with De Graafschap until the end of the season but the deal broke. Xamax went bankrupt shortly after his return to the club.

In June 2012, Keller signed a three-year contract with Dutch club Almere City. He retired from professional football after having played three seasons with the club, in July 2015. Afterwards, he played for one season at amateur club VV De Meern, but retired altogether due to recurring injuries.

== Coaching career ==
In September 2015, Keller became a coach in the youth department of his former club, Utrecht, initially focusing on the U14 team. In November 2020, Keller was appointed assistant to first-team head coach René Hake. After Hake's departure, Keller was appointed assistant coach of Jong FC Utrecht, the reserve team of FC Utrecht that competes in the second-tier Eerste Divisie.

== Career statistics ==
Appearances and goals by club, season and competition
Club	Season	League		
Club	Season	Division	Apps	Goals
Utrecht	1999–00	Eredivisie	1	0
RBC Roosendaal	2000–01	Eredivisie	25	0
RBC Roosendaal	2001–02	Jupiler League	28	2
RBC Roosendaal	2002–03	Eredivisie	24	1
Utrecht	2003–04	Eredivisie	23	2
Utrecht	2004–05	Eredivisie	23	2
Utrecht	2005–06	Eredivisie	30	1
Utrecht	2006–07	Eredivisie	8	2
Utrecht	2007–08	Eredivisie	26	2
Utrecht	2008–09	Eredivisie	29	5
Utrecht	2009–10	Eredivisie	23	5
Utrecht	2010–11	Eredivisie	3	0
Neuchâtel Xamax	2010–11	Swiss Super League	16	3
Neuchâtel Xamax	2011–12	Swiss Super League	0	0
Almere City	2012–13	Eerste Divisie	4	0
Almere City	2013–14	Eerste Divisie	18	2
Almere City	2014–15	Eerste Divisie	31	4
Career total			312	28

== Honours ==
Utrecht

- KNVB Cup: 2003–04
