= 2013–14 Stoke City F.C. season =

Stoke City
2013–14 season
- Chairman: Peter Coates
- Manager: Mark Hughes
- Stadium: Britannia Stadium
- Premier League: 9th (50 points)
- FA Cup: Fourth Round
- League Cup: Fifth Round
- Top goalscorer: League: Peter Crouch (8); All: Peter Crouch (10)
- Highest home attendance: 27,429 v Fulham (3 May 2014)
- Lowest home attendance: 24,822 v Swansea City (12 February 2014)
- Average home league attendance: 26,137
Home colours	Away colours

The 2013–14 season was Stoke City's sixth season in the Premier League and the 58th in the top tier of English football.

Stoke went into the 2013–14 season under new manager Mark Hughes following the departure of Tony Pulis at the end of last season. Hughes stated his intent to change the teams' style of play to a more possession based game but a lack of transfer activity before the season started saw Stoke installed as one of the bookies favourites for relegation. Stoke began well narrowly losing to Liverpool and then beating Crystal Palace and West Ham but the club failed to address their goalscoring problem in the transfer market with winger Marko Arnautović the only forward signed during the summer.

This proved problematic for Stoke as they went through September and October without a win, picking up just two points and scoring only three goals. Stoke improved in November and December going a run of one defeat in seven games which included a 3–2 win over Chelsea although they did end 2013 with heavy defeats at Newcastle and Tottenham. Stoke had a poor January picking up just one point and defeat at Sunderland left the side on the edge of the relegation places. However the arrival of Peter Odemwingie from Cardiff City in a swap deal with Kenwyne Jones saw Hughes able to change his formation and tactics which instantly paid off with a 2–1 victory over Manchester United on 1 February. Stoke's form and performances improved thereafter and they went through March unbeaten with four victories. Stoke maintained their form until the end of the season where they finished in 9th position with 50 points their best finish since the 1974–75 season.

== Pre-season ==
Stoke ended the 2012–13 season in 13th position with 42 points in what was a season of little excitement or progress and led to the departure of manager Tony Pulis. Another Welshman, Mark Hughes emerged as the boards favoured candidate to take over the job. News of his potential arrival was met with a largely negative reaction from the supporters who saw Hughes as an underwhelming choice mainly due to his poor spell in charge of Queens Park Rangers. Hughes was appointed Stoke manager on 30 May 2013 signing a three-year contract. Hughes's first task was to release Rory Delap, Mamady Sidibe, Matthew Upson, Dean Whitehead, Carlo Nash and Matthew Lund whilst he gave Jermaine Pennant a new contract. He made his first signing on 28 June 2013 with Dutch international left-back Erik Pieters arriving from PSV Eindhoven for a fee of €3.6 million (£3 million). This was followed by Spanish defender Marc Muniesa on a free transfer from Barcelona.

Stoke returned to training on 8 July where the squad met up with Mark Hughes at Clayton Wood for the first time. The next day they went to nearby St George's Park for fitness tests. The squad then travelled to Évian-les-Bains for a five-day training camp. They squad then spent a week at Clayton Wood, playing a match against Burton Albion, winning 2–0 before departing for the United States to play friendlies against Houston Dynamo, FC Dallas and Philadelphia Union. Stoke announced that they will offer supporters free bus travel to every Premier League away game in the 2013–14 season.

Stoke's first pre-season match against Houston ended in a 2–0 defeat with goals from Andrew Driver and Giles Barnes. Stoke performed better in their next match against FC Dallas, and won the match 1–0 thanks to a well worked goal scored by Walters. However, the match did end on a poor note as Cameron Jerome saw a penalty kick saved by Chris Seitz and then Andy Wilkinson was sent-off for a poor tackle. Stoke's final match in the United States saw them beat the Philadelphia Union 2–0 thanks to early goals from Michael Kightly and Brek Shea. However the match was overshadowed due to an injury sustained by Shea. On their return to the UK, Stoke took on Mark Hughes' hometown club Wrexham and won 1–0 with Walters scoring the goal. Stoke ended their pre-season with a goalless draw against Italian side Genoa.

Match	Date	Opponent	Venue	Result	Attendance	Scorers	Report
1	24 July 2013	Houston Dynamo	A	0–2	14,123		Report
2	27 July 2013	FC Dallas	A	1–0	10,000	Walters 25'	Report
3	30 July 2013	Philadelphia Union	A	2–0	8,000	Kightly 4', Shea 18'	Report
4	4 August 2013	Wrexham	A	1–0	2,290	Walters 51'	Report
5	10 August 2013	Genoa	H	0–0	9,955		Report

== Premier League ==
=== August ===
Stoke's first match of the 2013–14 saw them come up against Liverpool at Anfield and prior to the match Hughes spoke of his intentions of playing an attacking style of football. City suffered a blow before kick-off after Wilson Palacios pulled out after feeling ill in the warm-up and was taken to hospital where he underwent a "minor surgical procedure". A frantic opening 15 minutes saw Stoke hit the crossbar through Robert Huth and Kolo Touré did likewise for Liverpool who then saw Daniel Sturridge have a goal ruled out for offside. Asmir Begović was forced to make a number of fine saves to keep Liverpool out but he did conceded one after 37 minutes after a low shot from Sturridge found its way in to the bottom corner. Liverpool controlled most of the second half in particular Philippe Coutinho and only some more saves from Begović kept Stoke in the match. Stoke did have the chance to come away with a point after Daniel Agger handled in the area in the final moments but Jonathan Walters saw his spot kick saved by Simon Mignolet who also blocked Kenwyne Jones' rebound meaning that Hughes' first match ended in a defeat.

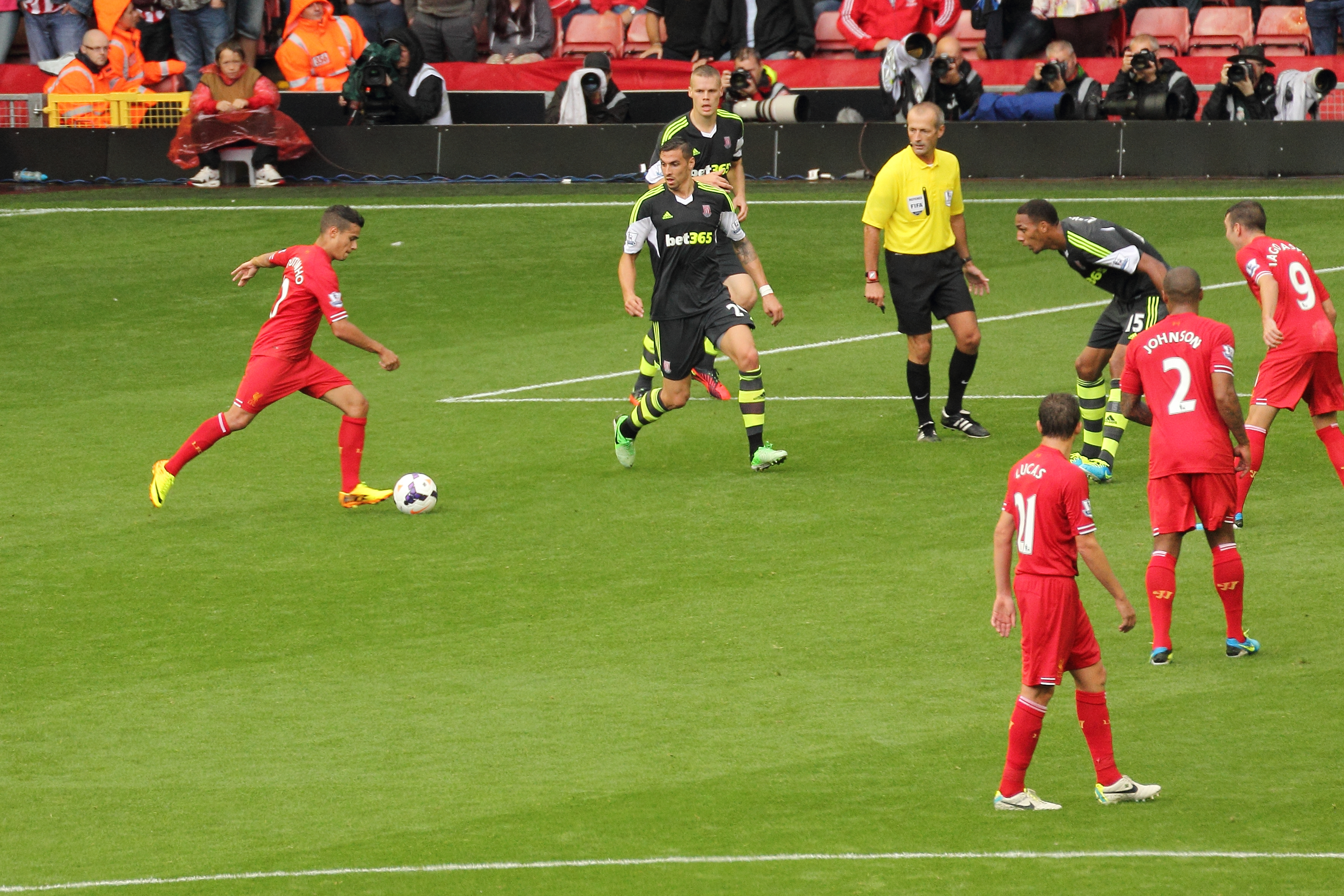
Stoke City faced Liverpool in their first Premier League match of the year

Hughes' first home match against Ian Holloway's Crystal Palace saw Stoke play poorly in the first half with Peter Crouch guilty of poor finishing. Palace took advantage with Marouane Chamakh getting the better of Ryan Shawcross to put the Eagles in front. Stoke improved greatly in the second half and won the match with goals from Adam and Shawcross to earn Stoke their first win of the season.

After beating Walsall in the League Cup Stoke made the trip to the capital to take on West Ham United. Stoke produced arguably their best away performance in the Premier League as they controlled the 90 minutes at Upton Park and won the match late on after substitute Jermaine Pennant curled in a free-kick past Jussi Jääskeläinen. After the match Hughes stated that it was a 'near-perfect' performance from his side.

=== September ===
On transfer deadline day Stoke brought in Stephen Ireland on loan from Aston Villa and Austrian forward Marko Arnautović from Werder Bremen while Michael Kightly, Ryan Shotton and Cameron Jerome all left the club on long-term loans. After the international break the Premier League returned with Hughes coming up against one of his former clubs, Manchester City. Stoke produced another solid and fluent performance and had a number of fine opportunities to win the match but were guilty of some poor finishing. Man City on the other hand were disappointing and rarely troubled the Stoke defence and the match ended in a goalless draw.

Stoke then travelled to Arsenal where they were defeated 3–1 with goals from Aaron Ramsey, Per Mertesacker and Bacary Sagna whilst Geoff Cameron scored his first goal for Stoke. It was a poor defensive performance from City as all of Arsenal goals came from set-pieces.

The following week saw Stoke produce an abject performance against Chris Hughton's Norwich City. The Canaries were on top for most of the match and earned a 1–0 win after Jonny Howson's 25-yard strike in the first half.

=== October ===
Stephen Ireland made his first start for Stoke away at Fulham on 5 October whose manager Martin Jol went into the match under great pressure. Stoke were the better team and had two penalty appeals dismissed by the referee Roger East in the first half. Huth then had two headers cleared off the line by the Fulham defence before Darren Bent scored to win the match for the Cottagers.

After the international break Stoke returned to action with a home match against Midlands rivals West Bromwich Albion. Stoke went into the game with only four goals to their name in seven matches and again they failed to register a goal as the match ended in a 0–0 draw. Stoke were fortunate to get a point from the match as Begović had to make three saves to keep out Stéphane Sessègnon and Albion should have had a penalty when Charlie Adam tripped Youssouf Mulumbu.

Stoke then travelled to Old Trafford to take on Manchester United and made a great start with Peter Crouch, making his first start since 24 August, scoring in the fourth minute. Stoke had chances to extend their lead through Walters but David de Gea made a fine double save before Robin van Persie scored just before half time. Stoke did go into the break in front however as Marko Arnautović scored his first Stoke goal from a 25-yard free-kick. Arnautović went off injured early into the second half and Stoke were unable to hold on for victory as goals from Wayne Rooney and Javier Hernández meant that Stoke ended October just outside the relegation zone.

=== November ===
Strong winds greeted high flying Southampton at the Britannia Stadium and Stoke took the unusual step of deciding to swap ends after winning the toss. It was a decision which instantly paid off as Southampton gave the ball away from kick-off and Pieters passed the ball back to goalkeeper Begović whose long kick downfield deceived Artur Boruc after only 13 seconds, becoming the second Stoke 'keeper to score a goal with the other being Dennis Herod. It was not enough to earn Stoke the win as Jay Rodriguez's looping header earned the Saints a point.

Stoke then travelled to Swansea on 10 November and scored twice in the first half through Walters and Ireland. However, a second half collapse saw the Swans score three goals to make the score 3–2. Stoke rescued a point after Charlie Adam converted a penalty in the final minute and the match ended 3–3.

After the international break the Premier League returned with a match against Sunderland at the Britannia. The Potters took the lead through Charlie Adam just past the half-hour after being set-up by Steven Nzonzi. Sunderland's task was made harder when Wes Brown was sent-off for a sliding tackle on Adam although Brown clearly won the ball. In the second half Stoke created and missed a number of chances before Nzonzi chipped the ball past Vito Mannone to seal a 2–0 victory, ending a run of eight matches without a win.

Stoke were dealt a blow before their next match against Everton with Robert Huth being ruled out for the rest of the season after undergoing knee surgery. In his place came Marc Muniesa for his first Premier League start but Stoke went onto produce an abject performance and crashed to a 4–0 defeat.

=== December ===
Stoke began the festive period with a frustrating goalless draw against newly promoted Cardiff City at the Britannia. Stoke had good chances to win the match but were guilty of some very poor finishing, having 17 shots with only two on target.

José Mourinho's Chelsea side were next to arrive at the Britannia and they made a quick start taking the lead through German winger André Schürrle after 10 minutes. Chelsea continued to dominate but could not get a second goal and just before half time Peter Crouch took advantage of a mistake from Petr Čech from a corner. Stoke came back into the match after the break and Stephen Ireland scored with a placed shot only for Schürrle to score just three minutes later. He almost got a hat-trick but his long range effort cannoned off the crossbar. Ireland then wasted a good chance before Oussama Assaidi curled in a last minute winner to win the game 3–2. It was Stoke's first league win over Chelsea since the 1974–75 season.

The next match against Hull City was a dour 0–0 draw with both teams struggling to create clear goal scoring opportunities.

The final home match of 2013 was a Midlands derby against Aston Villa and while it was an uneventful opening 45 minutes there was one major incident when Marc Wilson tripped Andreas Weimann who would have been through on goal but the referee deemed it not to be a clear goal scoring opportunity and showed Wilson a yellow card. At half time, Hughes decided to replace the ineffective Arnautović with Charlie Adam and soon after he scored after a flick on from Crouch. However, Villa scored an equaliser after a long ball from Brad Guzan fell to Pieters, whose attempted header back to Begović fell to Libor Kozák. Stoke were not to denied through and won the match 2–1 after Cameron's cross missed both Guzan and the Villa defence to leave Crouch with a simple tap in.

On Boxing Day, Stoke made the long journey to Newcastle United, where they were without the injured Asmir Begović who was replaced by Thomas Sørensen. Stoke made a good start and took the lead through Assaidi, however Glenn Whelan was then sent-off for two bookable offences by Martin Atkinson which resulted in a furious Mark Hughes also being sent from the dugout. It got worse for Stoke as just before half time they were reduced to nine-men as Wilson was shown a straight red for conceding a penalty which helped Newcastle to run out 5–1 winners. After the match Hughes was charged by the FA for improper conduct whilst Stoke lodged an official complaint against Atkinson with Peter Coates branding him a "disgrace".

Stoke ended 2013 with a poor 3–0 defeat against Tim Sherwood's Tottenham Hotspur. Roberto Soldado converted a penalty just before half time after Shawcross handled in the area before strikes from Mousa Dembélé and Aaron Lennon gave Spurs an easy win.

=== January ===
2014 began with a home fixture against Everton and in what was an even first half it was the Toffees who came closest to scoring with Kevin Mirallas hitting the crossbar and then the post. At half time, Jack Butland came on for an injured Thomas Sørensen. Stoke took the lead in the 49th minute after Whelan's cross was only half cleared by John Stones and the ball fell to Assaidi who fired past Tim Howard. With Stoke looking to hold on to the three points a clumsy tackle by Jermaine Pennant on Leon Osman resulted in Leighton Baines scoring a late penalty.

Stoke's next home game was against the other Merseyside club, Liverpool on 12 January. Jack Butland made his first start in the league but conceded early on as Aly Cissokho's shot deflected in off Shawcross and then a mistake by Wilson and Butland handed Luis Suárez an easy tap in. With Liverpool threatening to run riot Stoke came back and scored through Crouch and Adam to make it 2–2 at half time. Liverpool went back in front after Wilson was adjudged to have fouled Raheem Sterling in the area and Steven Gerrard converted the penalty. With Stoke pressing for an equaliser Liverpool counterattacked expertly and Luis Suárez curled a shot past Butland to make it 4–2. Walters got another one back for Stoke before Daniel Sturridge made it 5–3 to Liverpool.

The first away match of 2014 came against Crystal Palace who were managed by former manager Tony Pulis. Stoke produced a very poor performance and another defensive mistake which allowed Jason Puncheon to score the only goal as the side slipped to another away defeat.

On 28 January 2014 Stoke did a deal with Cardiff City to exchange Kenwyne Jones for Peter Odemwingie. He started the next day against fellow relegation rivals Sunderland at the Stadium of Light as Stoke made a slow start which cost them as Adam Johnson capitalised on an error from the returning Asmir Begović. Stoke pressed hard for an equaliser but their task was made harder when Nzonzi was sent-off for two bookable offences and the Black Cats held on to condemn Stoke to another defeat.

=== February ===
Stoke endured a frustrating January transfer deadline day before they played Manchester United after deals for Lee Cattermole and Jonathan Pitroipa fell through. Hughes gave Odemwingie his home debut and decided to change formation to 4–4–2 for the visit of David Moyes' Manchester United who had the trio of Wayne Rooney, Robin van Persie and Juan Mata playing together for the first time. The Red Devils suffered two defensive injuries in the first half as Jonny Evans and Phil Jones went off injured. Stoke took the lead on 38 minutes after Charlie Adam's long-range free-kick deflected in off Michael Carrick. Van Persie scored in his eighth consecutive match against the Potters just after half time before Adam scored his second goal with a powerful shot. Stoke had chances to extend their lead but were thankful to Asmir Begović for saving a late Rooney free-kick and earn Stoke their first league win over Manchester United since 1984.

Stoke then took on Southampton at St Mary's on 8 February. The Saints scored early on as Rickie Lambert curled in a free-kick from a tight angle. Stoke pulled level on 38 minutes as good build up play led to Adam's through ball sending Odemwingie through one-on-one which he dispatched to score his first Stoke goal. However, Southampton went back in front straight away as a Steven Davis cross missed everyone and ended up in the goal. Crouch converted a Charlie Adam corner just before half-time. The second half saw both sides cancel each other out and the match ended in a 2–2 draw.

On 12 February Stoke faced fellow relegation rivals Swansea at the Britannia which was played despite strong winds. The Swans arrived in buoyant mood after they beat their local rivals Cardiff 3–0 under new manager Garry Monk. Stoke scored first through Crouch after Odewingie's shot hit the post, however Swansea were the better team afterwards and levelled just after half time through Chico Flores. Wilfried Bony almost won the game late on but his shot was cleared off the line by Ryan Shawcross as Stoke were thankful to come away with a point.

Stoke ended February with a tough trip to title favourites Manchester City and despite putting in a spirited performance Stoke fell to a single goal from Yaya Touré.

=== March ===
Stoke began a potential season defining month with a visit from title challengers Arsenal. The match saw little clear goalscoring opportunities for either side in the first half with Stoke playing brighter in the second half. They missed chances through Cameron and Crouch before Laurent Koscielny handled in the area and Walters scored the resulting penalty kick. Yaya Sanogo wasted Arsenal's best chance to pull level and Stoke held out for the three points. There was some bad news for Stoke after the match as Charlie Adam was given a retrospective three-match ban for an incident with Olivier Giroud.

The Potters made the long trip to Norwich on 8 March and squandered two early chances to take the lead with Crouch and Walters both causing the Norwich defence problems. The Canaries made Stoke pay for their missed chances with Bradley Johnson scoring just after half time. Stoke were awarded a penalty when Sébastien Bassong brought down substitute John Guidetti and Walters fired the ball past 'keeper John Ruddy. However Walters was then sent-off for the first time in his career after a high challenge on Alexander Tettey and despite some late Norwich pressure Stoke were able to hang on for a point.

Stoke then faced West Ham on 15 March looking to complete the double over the Hammers but made a poor start to the match with Andy Carroll heading in after just four minutes. Stephen Ireland almost responded instantly for Stoke, forcing Adrián into a diving save. Stoke levelled on 30 minutes after Ireland's corner was headed onto the crossbar by Crouch and his rebound deflected in off Odemwingie. In an eventful second period Kevin Nolan had a goal disallowed for West Ham before goals from Arnautović and a powerful strike from Odemwingie earned Stoke a 3–1 victory lifting them to 11th position.

For a second week running Stoke were looking for another double this time over Midlands rivals Aston Villa. Stoke made a slow start and fell behind after five minutes after slack defending by Geoff Cameron allowed Fabian Delph to cross to Christian Benteke for a simple goal. Stoke came back strongly and levelled after good link up play between Odemwingie and Crouch. Soon after Crouch converted Pieters cut back and it got better for Stoke as after a sustained period of possession ended with Nzonzi firing in a third just before half time. Villa tried and failed to get back to the contest after the break and Stoke sealed an emphatic 4–1 victory in the 90th minute with Cameron firing past Brad Guzan after great wing play by Arnautović.

Stoke ended a successful month with a home match against Steve Bruce's Hull City. The Tigers were very well organised and goal scoring chances were rare. It took a mistake from Hull to break the deadlock as Ahmed Elmohamady's cross field ball was intercepted by Odemwingie who ran at the Hull defence and fired a low shot past Steve Harper to earn Stoke a 1–0 win and move them on to 40 points.

=== April ===
Stoke's five game unbeaten run came to an end at Chelsea on 5 April win a 3–0 defeat. Goals from Egyptian winger Mohamed Salah, Frank Lampard and Willian earned the Blues a straightforward victory.

Stoke maintained their good home record after beating Newcastle United 1–0 on 12 April. The only goal of the match came just before half-time after Erik Pieters attempted cross deceived Newcastle 'keeper Tim Krul. Stoke had chances to extend their lead after the break but poor finishing enabled Newcastle to stay in the game and they almost scored through Vurnon Anita but his header was off target.

The Potters then travelled to relegation threatened Cardiff City for what was Stoke's first league fixture at the Cardiff City Stadium. The Bluebirds made the better start with Mats Møller Dæhli setting up Jordon Mutch but his shot was poor. Stoke almost scored via a counterattack through Odemwingie but David Marshall produced a fine diving save. Just before half time Stoke were awarded a penalty after Odemwingie was pushed over by Kim Bo-kyung and Marko Arnautović beat Marshall. Just after half time Cardiff were then given a penalty which was dispatched by Peter Whittingham. Cardiff through they took the lead when Cala scored but after a lengthy delay it was ruled out for offside. Stoke had chances to win the match with Assasidi and Walters going close but the match ended in a 1–1 draw.

For the penultimate home match of the season against Tottenham Stoke were looking to record five home wins in a row for the first time in the Premier League. They were left disappointed however as a solitary goal from Danny Rose earned Spurs the three points. It was frustrating match for Stoke as Ryan Shawcross was sent-off for two bookable offences whilst goalscorer Rose avoided a red card for pushing Geoff Cameron.

=== May ===
The final home match of the season saw Stoke come up against Felix Magath's Fulham side who went into the match knowing that they needed to win in order to avoid relegation. Stoke dominated the match from the start and after squandering numerous chances they eventually went in from just before half time through Odemwingie despite the best efforts of Dan Burn. The second half saw no change to the pattern of play and Stoke added to the score with goals from Arnautović and Assaidi before Kieran Richardson pulled a goal back for the Cottagers. Matthew Etherington came off the bench to play his final match for the club before Walters made it 4–1 and condemn Fulham to the Championship. The result moved Stoke onto 47 points equalling their best tally in the Premier League which was set in the 2009–10 season. The result also earned Stoke title of best placed team in the Midlands for the first time in their history.

Stoke's final match of the 2013–14 season was against Midlands rivals West Bromwich Albion at the Hawthorns. Stoke won the match 2–1 with an own goal from Gareth McAuley and a late Charlie Adam strike earned Stoke the three points and saw them end the season in ninth position with 50 points. It completed Stoke's best season in the Premier League and their best finish since the 1974–75 season and Mark Hughes stated that the team had achieved what they set out to do.

=== Results ===
Match	Date	Opponent	Venue	Result	Attendance	Scorers	Report
1	17 August 2013	Liverpool	A	0–1	44,822		Report
2	24 August 2013	Crystal Palace	H	2–1	25,270	Adam 58', Shawcross 62'	Report
3	31 August 2013	West Ham United	A	1–0	34,946	Pennant 82'	Report
4	14 September 2013	Manchester City	H	0–0	25,052		Report
5	22 September 2013	Arsenal	A	1–3	60,002	Cameron 26'	Report
6	29 September 2013	Norwich City	H	0–1	26,184		Report
7	5 October 2013	Fulham	A	0–1	24,634		Report
8	19 October 2013	West Bromwich Albion	H	0–0	25,904		Report
9	26 October 2013	Manchester United	A	2–3	75,274	Crouch 4', Arnautović 45'	Report
10	2 November 2013	Southampton	H	1–1	26,053	Begović 1'	Report
11	10 November 2013	Swansea City	A	3–3	19,242	Walters 8', Ireland 25', Adam 90+5' (pen)	Report
12	23 November 2013	Sunderland	H	2–0	26,007	Adam 30, Nzonzi 81'	Report
13	30 November 2013	Everton	A	0–4	35,513		Report
14	4 December 2013	Cardiff City	H	0–0	25,014		Report
15	7 December 2013	Chelsea	H	3–2	25,154	Crouch 42', Ireland 50', Assaidi 90'	Report
16	14 December 2013	Hull City	A	0–0	23,324		Report
17	21 December 2013	Aston Villa	H	2–1	26,003	Adam 50', Crouch 70'	Report
18	26 December 2013	Newcastle United	A	1–5	51,655	Assaidi 29'	Report
19	29 December 2013	Tottenham Hotspur	A	0–3	36,072		Report
20	1 January 2014	Everton	H	1–1	25,832	Assaidi 49'	Report
21	12 January 2014	Liverpool	H	3–5	27,160	Crouch 39', Adam 45', Walters 85'	Report
22	18 January 2014	Crystal Palace	A	0–1	24,440		Report
23	29 January 2014	Sunderland	A	0–1	34,745		Report
24	1 February 2014	Manchester United	H	2–1	26,547	Carrick (o.g.) 38', Adam 52'	Report
25	8 February 2014	Southampton	A	2–2	27,987	Odemwingie 38', Crouch 44'	Report
26	12 February 2014	Swansea City	H	1–1	24,822	Crouch 17'	Report
27	22 February 2014	Manchester City	A	0–1	47,038		Report
28	1 March 2014	Arsenal	H	1–0	26,711	Walters 76' (pen)	Report
29	8 March 2014	Norwich City	A	1–1	26,464	Walters 73' (pen)	Report
30	15 March 2014	West Ham United	H	3–1	27,015	Crouch 32', Arnautović 69', Odemwingie 79'	Report
31	23 March 2014	Aston Villa	A	4–1	30,292	Odemwingie 22', Crouch 26', Nzonzi 42', Cameron 90'	Report
32	29 March 2014	Hull City	H	1–0	27,029	Odemwingie 62'	Report
33	5 April 2014	Chelsea	A	0–3	41,168		Report
34	12 April 2014	Newcastle United	H	1–0	27,400	Pieters 42'	Report
35	19 April 2014	Cardiff City	A	1–1	27,686	Arnautović 45' (pen)	Report
36	26 April 2014	Tottenham Hotspur	H	0–1	26,021		Report
37	3 May 2014	Fulham	H	4–1	27,429	Odemwingie 39', Arnautović 54', Assaidi 73', Walters 82'	Report
38	11 May 2014	West Bromwich Albion	A	2–1	26,613	McAuley 22' (o.g.), Adam 87'	Report

=== Final league table ===
Pos	Team	Pld	W	D	L	GF	GA	GD	Pts
7	Manchester United	38	19	7	12	64	43	+21	64
8	Southampton	38	15	11	12	54	46	+8	56
9	Stoke City	38	13	11	14	45	52	−7	50
10	Newcastle United	38	15	4	19	43	59	−16	49
11	Crystal Palace	38	13	6	19	33	48	−15	45

Source: Barclays Premier League
Rules for classification: 1) Points; 2) Goal difference; 3) Goals scored; 4) Play-offs (only if needed to decide champion, teams for relegation or teams for UEFA competitions).

== FA Cup ==
Championship side Leicester City were Stoke's opponents in the third round of the FA Cup and the Potters progressed 2–1 with goals from Kenwyne Jones and Charlie Adam whilst David Nugent scored for Leicester. Stoke were drawn away at Chelsea in the fourth round where were knocked out 1–0 with the Brazilian Oscar scoring the only goal of the match.

Round	Date	Opponent	Venue	Result	Attendance	Scorers	Report
R3	4 January 2014	Leicester City	H	2–1	16,844	Jones 16', Adam 55'	Report
R4	26 January 2014	Chelsea	A	0–1	40,845		Report

== League Cup ==
Stoke were drawn against Midlands opponents in the form of Walsall in the second round of the League Cup and won the match 3–1 thanks to a hat-trick from Kenwyne Jones. The third round saw Stoke again take on League One opposition this time Tranmere Rovers at Prenton Park. The Potters produced a professional performance and won 2–0 with goals from Stephen Ireland and Peter Crouch.

In the fourth round Stoke faced Birmingham City at St Andrews in what was a thrilling cup tie. Stoke took the lead through a long range strike from Oussama Assaidi before Tom Adeyemi powered through the Stoke defence to pull Birmingham level. Just before half time Birmingham were reduced to 10-men as Wade Elliott was sent off for striking Assaidi in the face. Stoke looked to have taken full advantage with goals from Crouch and Arnautović giving them a 3–1 lead. But Blues substitute Peter Løvenkrands scored twice in the final five minutes to send the tie to extra time. Kenwyne Jones then rounded 'keeper Colin Doyle to put Stoke back in front but again it was not enough as Olly Lee found the net after some woeful Stoke defending. The penalty shoot-out was a much more straight forward affair as Birmingham missed their first two while Stoke scored all theirs to progress to the fifth round. After the match Stoke's performance was criticised by captain Ryan Shawcross. Stoke's run in the competition was ended by Manchester United who won the match 2–0 with goals from Ashley Young and Patrice Evra.

Round	Date	Opponent	Venue	Result	Attendance	Scorers	Report
R2	28 August 2013	Walsall	H	3–1	11,667	Jones (3) 22', 31', 84'	Report
R3	25 September 2013	Tranmere Rovers	A	2–0	5,559	Ireland 23', Crouch 90+4'	Report
R4	29 October 2013	Birmingham City	A	4–4 (4–2 pens)	13,436	Assaidi 10', Crouch 55', Arnautović 71', Jones 94'	Report
QF	18 December 2013	Manchester United	H	0–2	25,928		Report

== Squad statistics ==
No.	Pos.	Name	Premier League		FA Cup		League Cup		Total		Discipline	
No.	Pos.	Name	Apps	Goals	Apps	Goals	Apps	Goals	Apps	Goals	Yellow card	Red card
1	GK	(Bosnia and Herzegovina) Asmir Begović	32	1	1	0	0	0	33	1	1	0
3	DF	(Netherlands) Erik Pieters	34(2)	1	2	0	1	0	37(2)	1	6	0
4	DF	(Germany) Robert Huth	12	0	0	0	3	0	15	0	4	0
5	DF	(Spain) Marc Muniesa	7(6)	0	0(1)	0	3	0	10(7)	0	0	0
6	MF	(Republic of Ireland) Glenn Whelan	28(4)	0	1	0	3	0	32(4)	0	6	1
7	MF	(England) Jermaine Pennant	0(8)	1	0	0	3	0	3(8)	1	1	0
8	MF	(Honduras) Wilson Palacios	5(11)	0	1	0	4	0	10(11)	0	3	0
9	FW	(Trinidad and Tobago) Kenwyne Jones	4(3)	0	1	1	1(1)	4	6(4)	5	1	0
9	FW	(Nigeria) Peter Odemwingie	15	5	0	0	0	0	15	5	2	0
10	FW	(Austria) Marko Arnautović	27(3)	4	2	0	2(1)	1	31(4)	5	3	0
11	MF	(United States) Brek Shea	0(1)	0	0	0	1(1)	0	1(2)	0	1	0
12	MF	(Republic of Ireland) Marc Wilson	30(3)	0	2	0	2(1)	0	34(4)	0	8	1
13	MF	(United States) Maurice Edu	0	0	0	0	0	0	0	0	0	0
14	MF	(Scotland) Jamie Ness	0	0	0	0	0	0	0	0	0	0
15	MF	(France) Steven Nzonzi	34(2)	2	2	0	1(1)	0	37(3)	2	6	1
16	MF	(Scotland) Charlie Adam	20(11)	7	1(1)	1	1(1)	0	22(13)	8	6	0
17	DF	(England) Ryan Shawcross (c)	37	1	2	0	4	0	43	1	7	1
19	FW	(Republic of Ireland) Jonathan Walters	27(5)	5	1(1)	0	1(1)	0	29(7)	5	8	1
20	DF	(United States) Geoff Cameron	37	2	2	0	2	0	41	2	7	0
22	GK	(England) Jack Butland	2(1)	0	1	0	0	0	3(1)	0	0	0
23	FW	(Sweden) John Guidetti	0(6)	0	0	0	0	0	0(6)	0	0	0
24	MF	(Morocco) Oussama Assaidi	12(7)	4	1(1)	0	2(2)	1	15(10)	5	1	0
25	FW	(England) Peter Crouch	30(4)	8	1	0	3	2	34(4)	10	7	0
26	MF	(England) Matthew Etherington	5(6)	0	0	0	0(1)	0	5(7)	0	0	0
28	DF	(England) Andy Wilkinson	2(3)	0	0	0	1	0	3(3)	0	1	0
29	GK	(Denmark) Thomas Sørensen	4	0	0	0	4	0	8	0	0	0
30	DF	(England) Ryan Shotton	0	0	0	0	0	0	0	0	0	0
31	MF	(England) Charlie Ward	0	0	0	0	0	0	0	0	0	0
32	MF	(Republic of Ireland) Stephen Ireland	14(11)	2	1	0	2(1)	1	17(12)	3	3	0
33	FW	(England) Cameron Jerome	0(1)	0	0	0	0	0	0(1)	0	0	0
35	GK	(Austria) Daniel Bachmann	0	0	0	0	0	0	0	0	0	0
–	–	Own goals	–	2	–	0	–	0	–	2	–	–

== Transfers ==
=== In ===
Date	Pos.	Name	From	Fee	Ref.
28 June 2013	DF	(Netherlands) Erik Pieters	(Netherlands) PSV	£3 million	
2 July 2013	DF	(Spain) Marc Muniesa	(Spain) Barcelona	Free	
2 September 2013	FW	(Austria) Marko Arnautović	(Germany) Werder Bremen	£2 million	
14 January 2014	MF	(Republic of Ireland) Stephen Ireland	(England) Aston Villa	Free	
21 January 2014	FW	(United States) Juan Agudelo	(United States) New England Revolution	Free	
28 January 2014	FW	(Nigeria) Peter Odemwingie	(Wales) Cardiff City	Player-exchange	

=== Out ===
Date	Pos.	Name	To	Fee	Ref.
20 May 2013	FW	(England) Michael Owen	Retired		
30 June 2013	MF	(Republic of Ireland) Rory Delap	(England) Burton Albion	Free	
30 June 2013	MF	(Northern Ireland) Matthew Lund	(England) Rochdale	Free	
30 June 2013	GK	(England) Carlo Nash	(England) Norwich City	Free	
30 June 2013	DF	(England) Matthew Upson	(England) Brighton & Hove Albion	Free	
30 June 2013	MF	(England) Dean Whitehead	(England) Middlesbrough	Free	
30 June 2013	FW	(Mali) Mamady Sidibé	(Bulgaria) CSKA Sofia	Free	
2 September 2013	MF	(Belgium) Florent Cuvelier	(England) Sheffield United	Undisclosed	
24 January 2014	MF	(England) Jermaine Pennant	Released	Free	
28 January 2014	FW	(Trinidad and Tobago) Kenwyne Jones	(Wales) Cardiff City	Player-exchange	

=== Loan in ===
Date from	Date to	Pos.	Name	From	Ref.
27 August 2013	30 June 2014	MF	(Morocco) Oussama Assaidi	(England) Liverpool	
2 September 2013	14 January 2014	MF	(Republic of Ireland) Stephen Ireland	(England) Aston Villa	
14 January 2014	30 June 2014	FW	(Sweden) John Guidetti	(England) Manchester City	

=== Loan out ===
Date from	Date to	Pos.	Name	To	Ref.
2 September 2013	30 June 2014	MF	(England) Michael Kightly	(England) Burnley	
2 September 2013	30 June 2014	FW	(England) Cameron Jerome	(England) Crystal Palace	
2 September 2013	2 January 2014	DF	(England) Ryan Shotton	(England) Wigan Athletic	
26 September 2013	26 December 2013	GK	(England) Jack Butland	(England) Barnsley	
1 January 2014	29 January 2014	MF	(United States) Brek Shea	(England) Barnsley	
3 January 2014	31 January 2014	MF	(Scotland) Jamie Ness	(England) Leyton Orient	
21 January 2014	30 June 2014	FW	(United States) Juan Agudelo	(Netherlands) Utrecht	
1 February 2014	31 December 2014	MF	(United States) Maurice Edu	(United States) Philadelphia Union	
21 February 2014	3 May 2014	GK	(England) Jack Butland	(England) Leeds United	
