= Marc-Antoine Fortuné =

French football manager (born 1981)

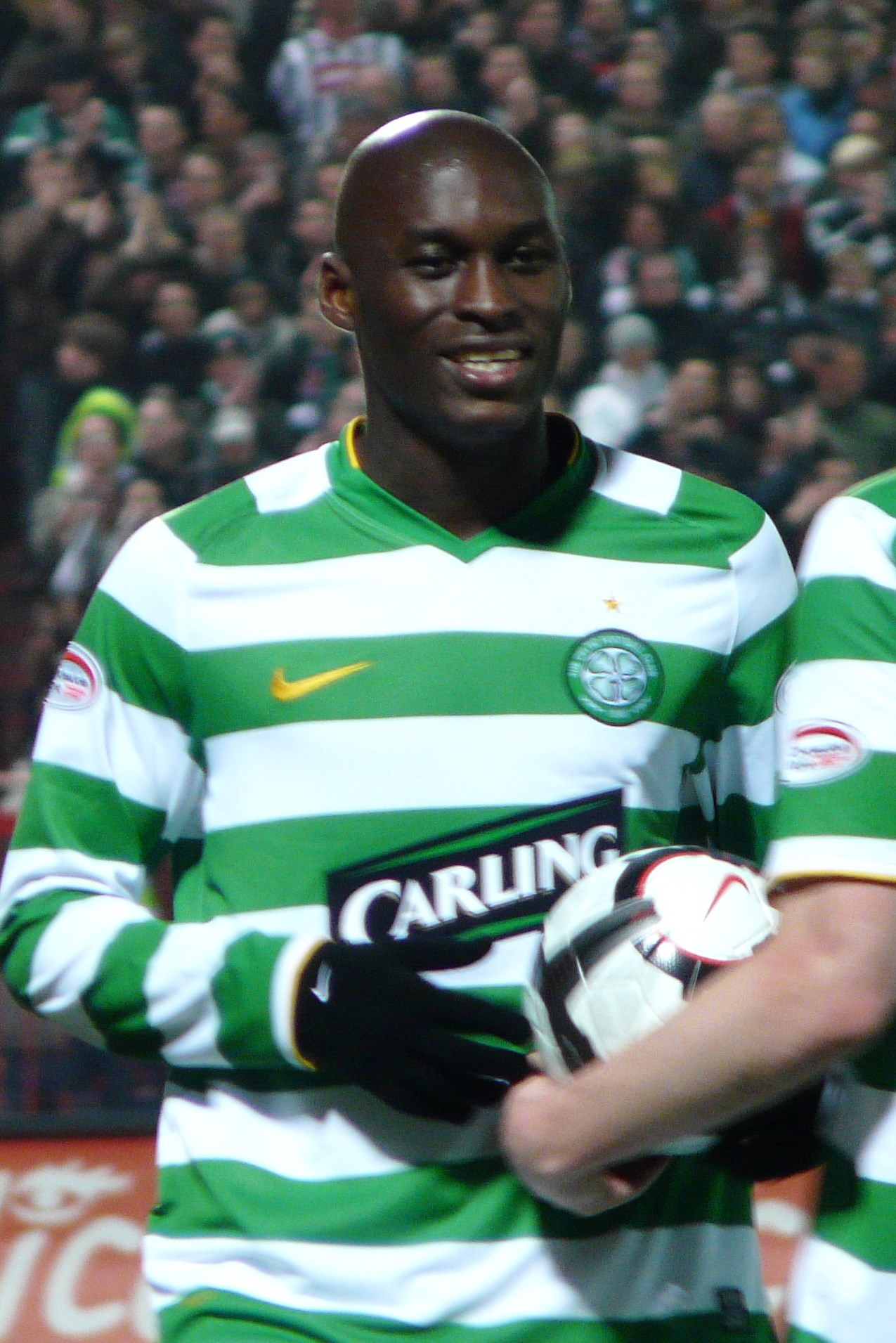
- Fortuné playing for Celtic in 2010

Personal information
- Full name: Marc-Antoine Martinien Fortuné
- Date of birth: 2 July 1981 (age 45)
- Place of birth: Cayenne, French Guiana, France
- Height: 1.83 m (6 ft 0 in)
- Position: Striker

Youth career
- Angoulême

Senior career*
Years	Team	Apps	(Gls)
1998–2002	Angoulême	63	(20)
2002–2004	Lille	16	(0)
2003–2004	→ Rouen (loan)	34	(10)
2004–2005	Brest	33	(10)
2005–2007	Utrecht	53	(11)
2007–2009	Nancy	71	(12)
2009	→ West Bromwich Albion (loan)	17	(5)
2009–2010	Celtic	32	(10)
2010–2013	West Bromwich Albion	63	(19)
2011	→ Doncaster Rovers (loan)	5	(1)
2013–2015	Wigan Athletic	71	(5)
2015–2016	Coventry City	24	(4)
2016–2018	Southend United	70	(9)
2018–2019	Chesterfield	28	(7)
2020–2021	La Louvière Centre	7	(0)
Total		587	(136)

Managerial career
- 2022: La Louvière Centre
- * Club domestic league appearances and goals

Marc-Antoine Martinien Fortuné (born 2 July 1981) is a French professional football manager and former player who played as a striker.

Fortuné started his professional career at Angoulême in 1998, switching to Lille in 2002. He spent the 2003–04 season on loan to Rouen and switched permanently to Brest in July 2004. A year later he moved to Dutch club Utrecht. He joined AS Nancy in January 2007, also spending a six-month loan spell at West Bromwich Albion from January 2009 until the end of the 2009–10 season. Fortuné signed for Celtic in July 2009 before returning to West Brom in August 2010, this time on a permanent deal. He later played for Doncaster Rovers, Wigan Athletic, Coventry City, Southend United and Chesterfield.

After retiring from football in 2021, he managed La Louvière Centre in the Belgian third division.

== Early life ==
As a child, Fortuné played both football and basketball, but gave the latter up at the age of 12 due to scheduling conflicts.

== Club career ==
=== Angoulême ===
At age 16 Fortuné was given a trial by the French club Rennes. He was not offered a contract, but instead signed for lower-league team Angoulême. He broke into the Angoulême side in the 1999–2000 season and had a successful start, scoring three goals in ten appearances before the end of the campaign. At the end of the 2000–01 season, Fortuné propelled the club out of the Championnat de France amateur and into the Championnat National, the third tier of French football. His continued goalscoring form and overall performance during this and the following season caused much speculation over his future with media reports constantly linking him with many Ligue 1 clubs. In the following summer, Fortuné joined Ligue 1 side Lille OSC. In all, Fortuné made a total of 63 league appearances for Angoulême, scoring 18 goals.

=== Lille ===
Upon joining Lille, the then 21-year-old struggled, finding himself playing on the left of midfield. This coupled with a constant series of injuries lead to dips in form and a low point in Fortuné's career. He was injured on his second appearance for the club and was ruled out for a month. Upon his return to action, he picked up another injury. This new injury caused Fortuné to be out of action for a further six weeks. In his first and only season for Lille, he started just seven times and only made a further nine appearances from the substitutes bench. During this season he was unable to score a single goal.

=== Rouen ===
Fortuné joined Ligue 2 club Rouen on loan in the summer of 2003 with an option to make the move permanent. With this fresh start for the young player, Fortuné saw a return to form. Playing from right-midfield he managed to score goals in his first three appearances which earned him a role back to his preferred role of striker. A successful season at Rouen ended with ten Ligue 2 goals in 34 appearances. His good form for Rouen earned him a move to Stade Brest.

=== Brest ===
Fortuné signed for Ligue 2 side Stade Brestois in July 2004, making it his third new club in three successive seasons. It turned out to be another successful move for Fortuné. He started the season playing wide on the right side of a front three. This led to a league position of 9th and a good run in the Coupe de France ending in the quarter-final stage. He scored 10 goals in 33 Ligue 2 appearances and started to draw attention from bigger clubs around Europe including Eredivisie side FC Utrecht.

=== Utrecht ===
In 2005 Fortuné moved to FC Utrecht in the Dutch Eredivisie. Finding himself back in the winger role he enjoyed a successful time at the club but struggled after the death of his friend, neighbour and teammate David Di Tommaso. During his time at Utrecht, Fortuné scored a total of 13 goals in 56 league and cup appearances for Utrecht. During the January transfer window of the following season he looked for a move back to France after an unsettling period in the Netherlands. He secured a move back before the transfer deadline and was signed by Coupe de la Ligue winners and Ligue 1 side Nancy.

=== Nancy ===
Fortuné returned to France in January 2007, this becoming his fifth move in as many years, with Tomblaine club AS Nancy. He started off his first season back in France well, scoring six goals in 17 Ligue 1 appearances. The 2007–08 season saw Fortuné struggling for form and failing to score a goal. This caused him to take on the role of a substitute for most of the season. He finished the 2007–08 campaign with just seven goals in 38 appearances, with most of them being from the bench. His third season back in France with Nancy saw much of the same as the previous. Fortuné made just 24 appearances with most of them as a second-half substitute. This season was even less successful as Fortuné netted only two goals during the Ligue 1 season. He became unsettled at Nancy but was unable to secure a move away from the Stade Marcel Picot during the summer transfer window. During the first half of the 2008–09 he was once again mainly used by Uruguayan coach Pablo Correa as a substitute with several clubs from the Premier League tracking his progress.

=== West Bromwich Albion ===
Fortuné moved to West Bromwich Albion in the January 2009 transfer window, joining on loan for the remainder of the 2008–09 season. He made his début for West Bromwich Albion in their 3–0 Premier League home win over Middlesbrough and scored by deflecting teammate Robert Koren's shot into the net. In just five months with the club, he became a fan favourite of the supporters, scoring five goals in eighteen appearances as well as creating other goals. He won the West Bromwich Albion Supporters' Player of the Year despite only joining the club in January.

=== Celtic ===
On 9 July 2009, Fortuné signed for Celtic in a deal worth £3.8 million. He scored his first league goals on 22 August in a 5–2 win against St Johnstone at Celtic Park and his first European goals on 18 December in a 3–3 draw against Rapid Vienna in the Europa League. Overall Fortuné's time at Celtic wasn't successful. Due to his big price tag and unimpressive goalscoring record, the player's stay at the Glasgow club was seen as a summation of the manager Tony Mowbray's ill-fated reign. The new Celtic manager, Neil Lennon didn't include Fortuné in his plans and thus the striker made his last appearance for the club against his former side FC Utrecht in the Europa League.

=== Return to West Bromwich Albion ===
On 27 August 2010, Fortuné completed a whirlwind return to The Hawthorns on a permanent basis after the striker joined West Bromwich Albion from Celtic for an undisclosed fee. He scored the first goal of his second spell with the club on 23 October 2010 in a 2–1 win over Fulham. Fortuné also scored the equalising goal, in a 2–2 draw at home, against Wigan Athletic on 1 February 2011. After his loan return from Doncaster Rovers, he began to make appearances for West Brom in 2012. On 4 February 2012, he started the game and scored the opening goal in a 2–1 defeat at home to Swansea City. This was just his 3rd goal for the Baggies.

He was released by West Brom at the end of the 2012–13 season.

=== Doncaster Rovers (loan) ===
In November 2011, Fortuné signed a loan deal with Doncaster Rovers. He made his début for the club in the 0–0 draw against Watford at the Keepmoat Stadium. He got his first assist for the club a week later, setting up Billy Sharp to score the winner against top of the table Southampton, again in front of the home fans. He scored his first goal for Doncaster in their 2–1 loss away at Birmingham City. However, on 20 December 2011, WBA recalled Fortuné along with two other loaned players due to an injury crisis.

=== Wigan Athletic ===
Fortuné signed for FA Cup holders Wigan Athletic on 5 July 2013. He signed on a two-year contract, on a free transfer. Fortuné made his début for The Latics away to Barnsley as a 74th-minute substitute on 3 August 2013, where he made two assists, including one to set up Shaun Maloney for Wigan's fourth goal in a 4–0 win at Oakwell. Fortuné scored his first goal for Wigan in a 1–0 victory away to Yeovil Town at Huish Park on 10 November 2013.

=== Coventry City ===
Fortuné joined Coventry in September 2015, signing a one-year contract.

=== Southend United ===
It was announced officially on 16 January 2017 that he has signed a new contract extension until the end of the 2017–18 season. Previously, on 29 September 2016, Fortunè signed a four-month contract at Southend United following a successful trial.

Fortunè scored his first goal for Southend on Tuesday 4 October 2016 in a 1–0 victory over Leyton Orient in an EFL Trophy match. Following his release by Southend he was reportedly on trial with Grimsby Town

=== Chesterfield ===
On 3 August 2018 it was announced that Fortuné had joined National League side Chesterfield. He took the squad number 32, making his début the following day as a second-half substitute in a 1–0 win at Ebbsfleet United. Fortuné was released by the club at the end of the season, having scored 7 goals in 29 appearances.

=== La Louvière Centre ===
On 29 September 2020, Fortuné signed with UR La Louvière Centre in the third-tier Belgian National Division 1. He retired in 2021, and instead joined the coaching staff of the club.

== International career ==
In August 2014, Fortuné was called up by French Guiana for the first time, to play in the qualifiers for the 2014 Caribbean Cup.

== Managerial career ==
In 2022, after retiring from football, Fortuné briefly managed Belgian National Division 1 club UR La Louvière Centre.

== Career statistics ==
Appearances and goals by club, season and competition
Club	Season	League			National cup (Note: Includes Coupe de France, KNVB Cup, FA Cup, Scottish Cup)		League cup (Note: Includes Coupe de la Ligue, Football League Cup)		Europe		Other		Total	
Club	Season	Division	Apps	Goals	Apps	Goals	Apps	Goals	Apps	Goals	Apps	Goals	Apps	Goals
Angoulême	2001–02	Championnat National	34	12	0	0	0	0	–		–		34	12
Lille	2002–03	Ligue 1	16	0	0	0	0	0	1 (Note: Appearance in UEFA Intertoto Cup)	0	–		16	0
Lille	2003–04	Ligue 1	0	0	0	0	0	0	–		–		0	0
Lille	Total		16	0	0	0	0	0	1	0	–		17	0
Rouen (loan)	2003–04	Ligue 2	34	10	0	0	1	0	–		–		35	10
Stade Brestois	2004–05	Ligue 2	33	10	0	0	2	1	–		–		35	12
Utrecht	2005–06	Eredivisie	31	6	1	1	–		–		–		32	7
Utrecht	2006–07	Eredivisie	22	5	2	1	–		–		–		24	6
Utrecht	Total		53	11	3	2	–		–		–		56	13
Nancy	2006–07	Ligue 1	15	5	–		–		2 (Note: Appearances in UEFA Cup)	1	–		17	6
Nancy	2007–08	Ligue 1	37	6	0	0	1	0	–		–		38	6
Nancy	2008–09	Ligue 1	19	1	1	0	1	0	5	1	–		26	2
Nancy	Total		71	12	1	0	2	0	7	2	–		81	14
West Bromwich Albion (loan)	2008–09	Premier League	17	5	1	0	0	0	–		–		18	5
Celtic	2009–10	Scottish Premier League	30	10	3	0	0	0	6 (Note: Four appearances in UEFA Champions League, two appearances and two goals in UEFA Europa League)	2	–		39	12
Celtic	2010–11	Scottish Premier League	2	0	0	0	0	0	2 (Note: One appearance in UEFA Champions League, one appearance in UEFA Europa League)	0	–		4	0
Celtic	Total		32	10	3	0	0	0	8	2	–		43	12
West Bromwich Albion	2010–11	Premier League	25	2	0	0	2	0	–		–		27	2
West Bromwich Albion	2011–12	Premier League	17	2	2	1	1	2	–		–		20	5
West Bromwich Albion	2012–13	Premier League	21	2	1	0	2	0	–		–		24	2
West Bromwich Albion	Total		63	6	3	1	5	2	–		–		70	9
Doncaster Rovers (loan)	2011–12	Championship	5	1	0	0	0	0	–		–		5	1
Wigan Athletic	2013–14	Championship	36	4	6	1	0	0	5 (Note: Appearances in UEFA Europa League)	0	2 (Note: One appearance in FA Community Shield, one appearance in Championship play-offs)	0	49	5
Wigan Athletic	2014–15	Championship	35	1	1	0	1	1	–		–		37	2
Wigan Athletic	Total		71	5	7	1	1	1	5	0	2	0	86	7
Coventry City	2015–16	League One	24	4	1	0	0	0	–		–		25	4
Southend United	2016–17	League One	32	5	1	0	0	0	–		3 (Note: Appearances in Football League Trophy)	1	36	6
Career total			485	91	20	4	11	4	21	4	5	1	548	104
