= Jasper Bolland =

Dutch footballer (born 1986)

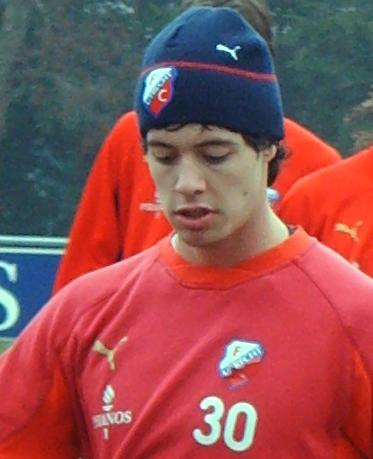

Personal information
- Date of birth: 13 May 1986 (age 40)
- Place of birth: Houten, Netherlands
- Height: 1.77 m (5 ft 10 in)
- Position: Midfielder

Youth career
- SV Houten
- 2001–2006: Utrecht

Senior career*
Years	Team	Apps	(Gls)
2006–2008	Utrecht	2	(0)
2008–2011	IJsselmeervogels		
2011–2012	GVVV		
2012–2014	VVA '71		
2014–2019	Eemdijk		
- * Club domestic league appearances and goals

Jasper Bolland (born 13 May 1986) is a Dutch former professional footballer.

== Club career ==
Bolland started his career in his hometown for SV Houten and joined 2001 in the football academy of FC Utrecht. The midfielder made his debut in professional football, being part of the FC Utrecht squad in the 2006-07 season.

After seven years in several teams of FC Utrecht, Bolland left the club and signed with IJsselmeervogels. On 20 April 2011 he signed a two-year contract with GVVV for the 2011/2012 season.

After just one season, his contract was resigned and he joined VVA '71. After two seasons at VVA he moved on to Eemdijk.

After having played for VV Eemdijk from 2014, Bolland announced his retirement from football on 15 February 2019.

== Personal life ==
Bolland works as an account manager for an IT business.
