= Tom Caluwé =

Belgian footballer

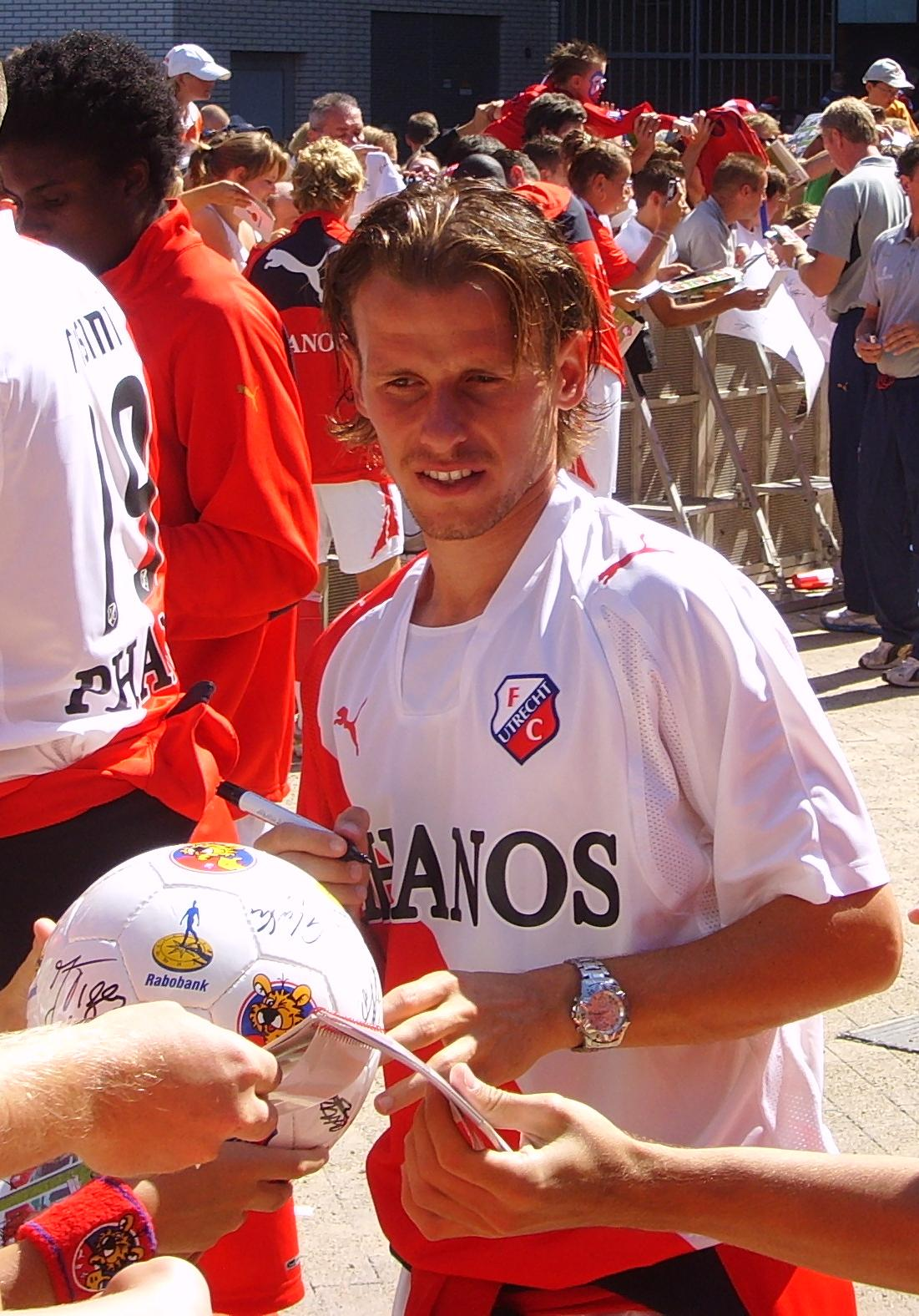
- Caluwé in 2007

Personal information
- Full name: Tom Caluwé
- Date of birth: 11 April 1978 (age 48)
- Place of birth: Rumst, Belgium
- Height: 1.72 m (5 ft 8 in)
- Position: Midfielder

Team information
- Current team: Mechelen (sporting director)

Senior career*
Years	Team	Apps	(Gls)
1996–2000	Mechelen	85	(16)
2000–2006	Willem II	169	(30)
2006–2009	Utrecht	105	(17)
2009–2010	Al-Wakrah	19	(3)
2010	Sint-Truiden	12	(0)
2011	AEK Larnaca	13	(1)
2011–2014	Londerzeel		

International career
2006	Belgium	1	(1)

Managerial career
- 2014–2018: Mechelen (assistant)
- 2016: Mechelen (caretaker)
- 2017: Mechelen (caretaker)
- * Club domestic league appearances and goals

Tom Caluwé (born 11 April 1978) is a Belgian football manager, executive, and former player. He currently serves as the sporting director of K.V. Mechelen.

== Club career ==
Caluwé is a midfielder who was born in Rumst and made his debut in professional football, being part of the K.V. Mechelen squad in the 1996–97 season. He also played for Willem II Tilburg and FC Utrecht in the Dutch Eredivisie before joining Al-Wakrah.

== International career ==
Caluwé represented Belgium in the 1997 FIFA World Youth Championship and he has one A-cap in which he scored.

Tom Caluwé: International Goals
Goal	Date	Venue	Opponent	Score	Result	Competition
1	11 May 2006	Trendwork Arena, Sittard	Saudi Arabia	1–2	Won	Friendly

== Managerial career ==
=== KV Mechelen ===
In the summer 2014, Caluwé returned to K.V. Mechelen as an assistant coach. In September 2016, Caluwé was appointed interim head coach, where he was in charge for one game, which he won 2–0 against Sint-Truidense. In October 2017, he was appointed interim head coach once again, this time for two games, which he both lost.

In May 2018, he was promoted to Mechelen's technical sporting department, as an assistant to the club's sporting director, Stefaan Vanroy. In the summer 2019, he was appointed sporting director of the club.
