= Rumpt =

- Village
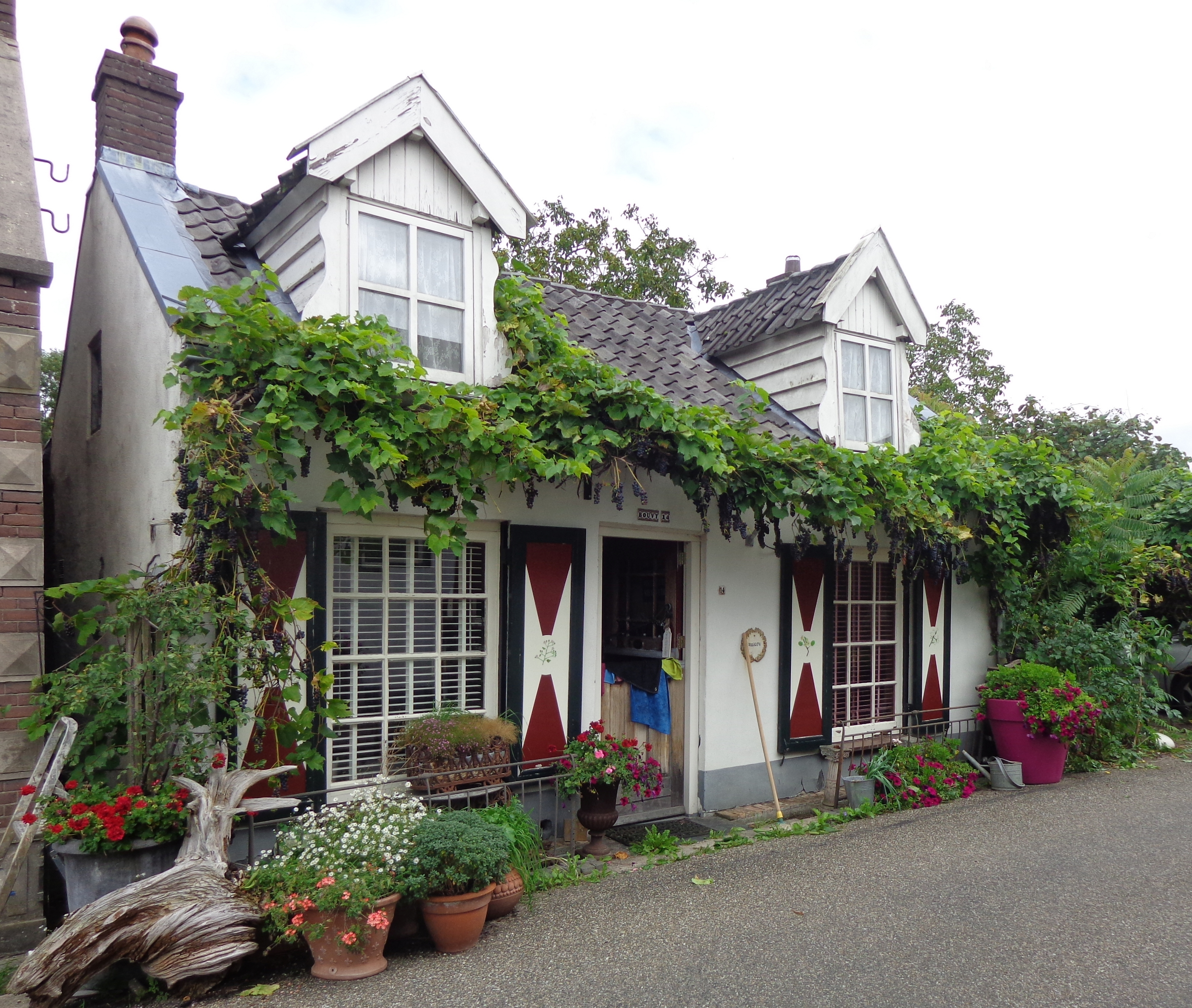
- House in Rumpt

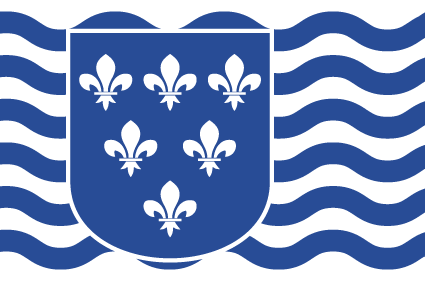
- Flag Coat of arms

- Location in the Netherlands Rumpt (Netherlands)
- Coordinates: 51.88337°N 5.17689°E
- Country: Netherlands
- Province: Gelderland
- Municipality: West Betuwe

Area
  - Total: 9.67 km^{2} (3.73 sq mi)
- Elevation: 2 m (6.6 ft)

Population (2021)
  - Total: 745
  - Density: 77.0/km^{2} (200/sq mi)
- Time zone: UTC+1 (CET)
  - Summer (DST): UTC+2 (CEST)
- Postal code: 4156
- Dialing code: 0345

Rumpt is a village in the Betuwe region in the Netherlands. It is a part of the municipality of West Betuwe, and is situated about halfway between Utrecht and Den Bosch, on the Linge river.

== History ==
Rumpt was first mentioned as Rumpst around the year 960 in a document listing the possessions of St. Martin's Church in Utrecht. Other names used for the village and the surrounding areas in historical documents were Rumede, Romde en Rumt. A stretched out esdorp developed along the Linge. The tower of the Dutch Reformed Church dates from around 1300. The church was built 15th century. The Catholic Church was built from 1851 to 1852 in neo-Gothic style.

In 1840, Rumpt was home to 658 people. The name was officially changed to Rumt in 1883, because the "p" is silent. The name change was undone in the early-20th century.

== Gallery ==
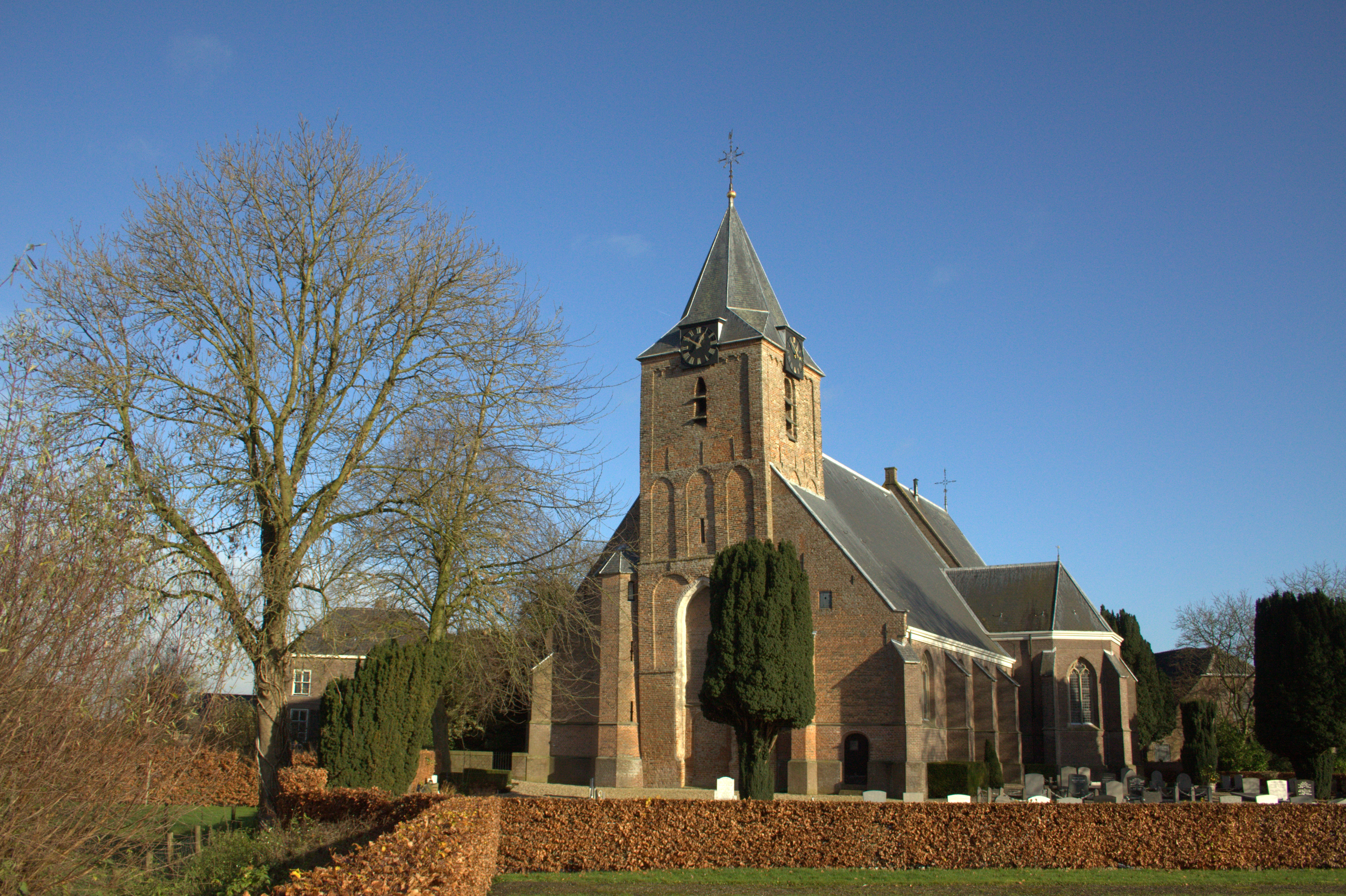
Dutch Reformed Church in Rumpt

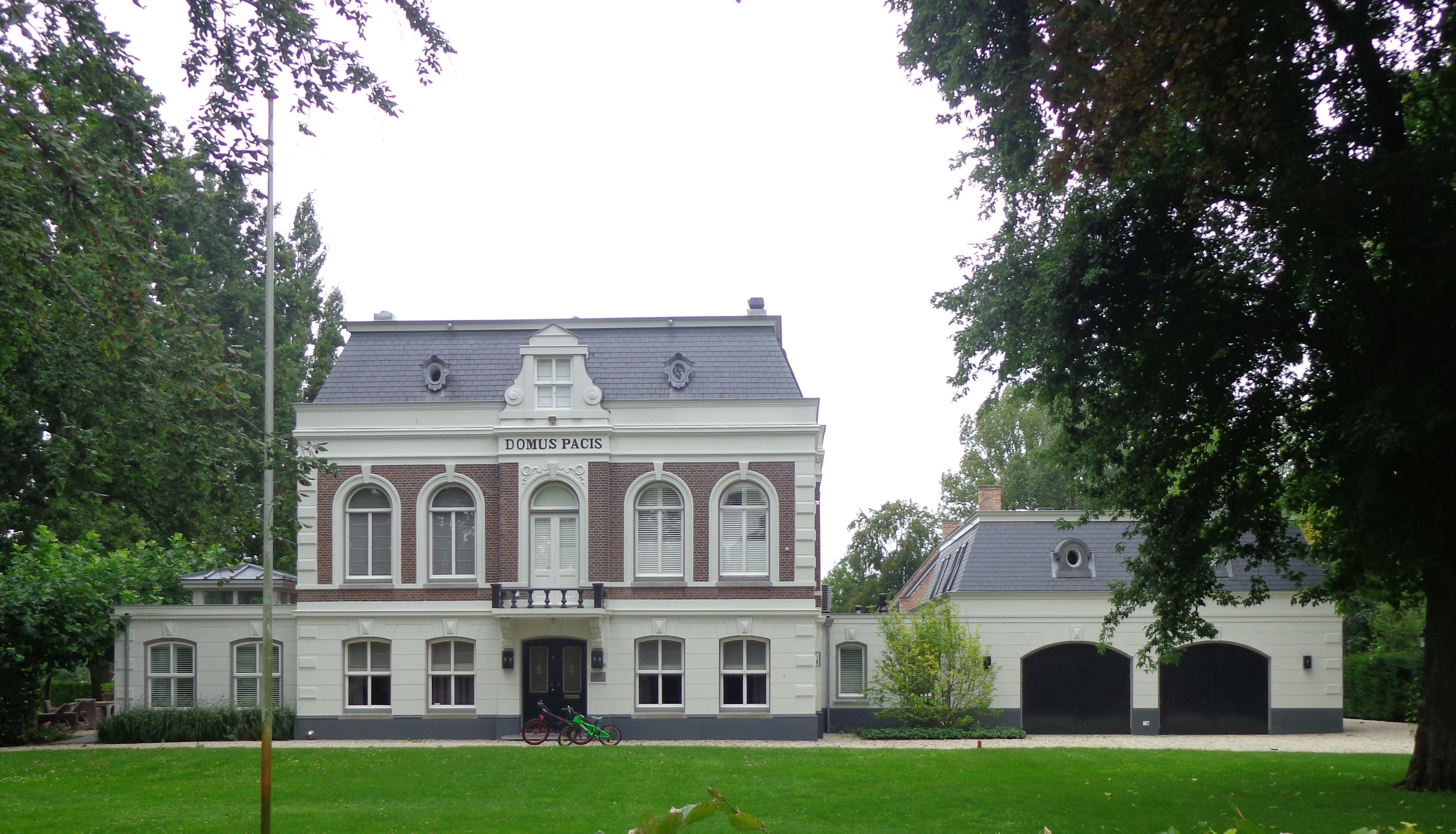
Villa "Domus Pacis"

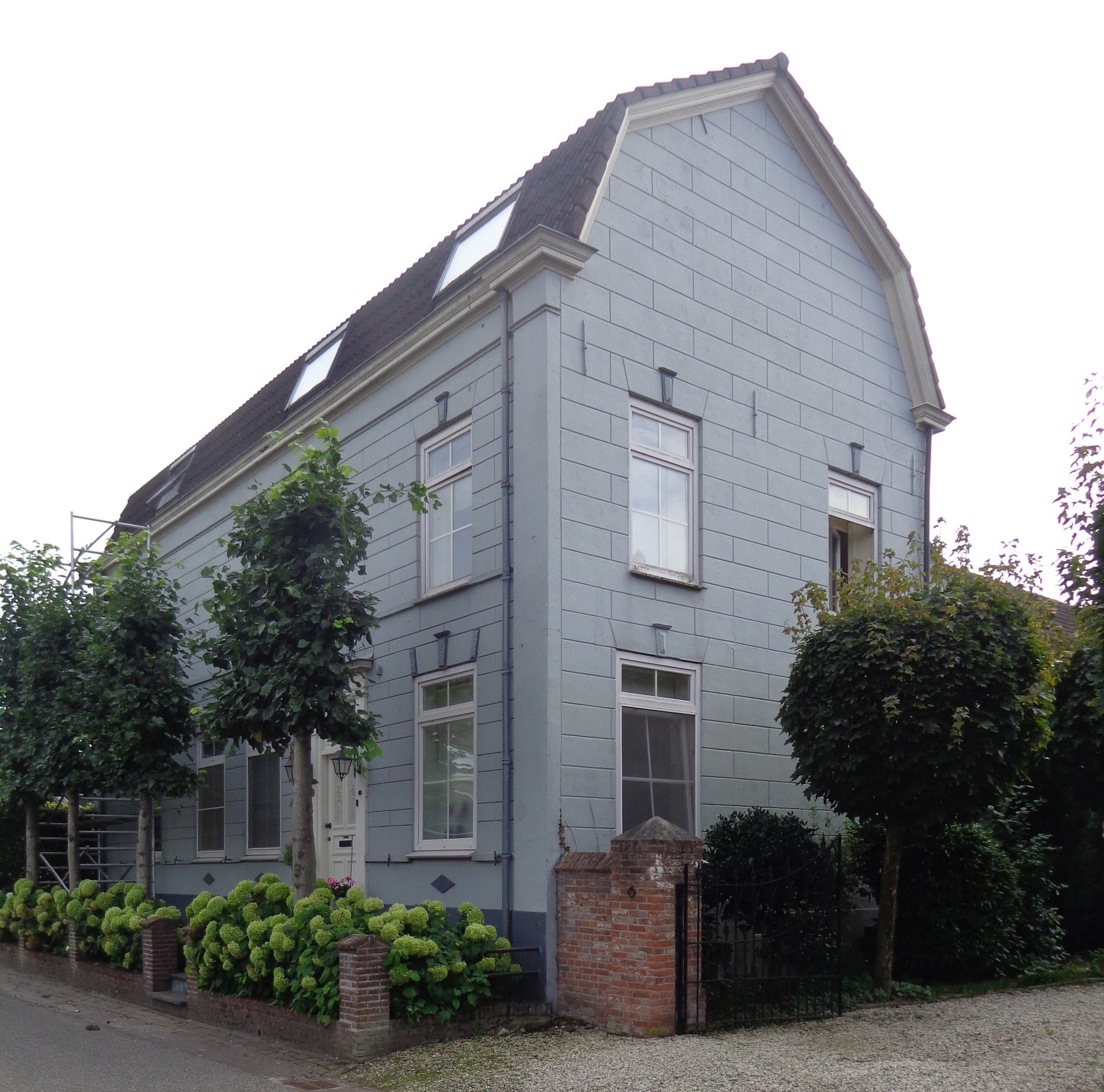
House in Rumpt

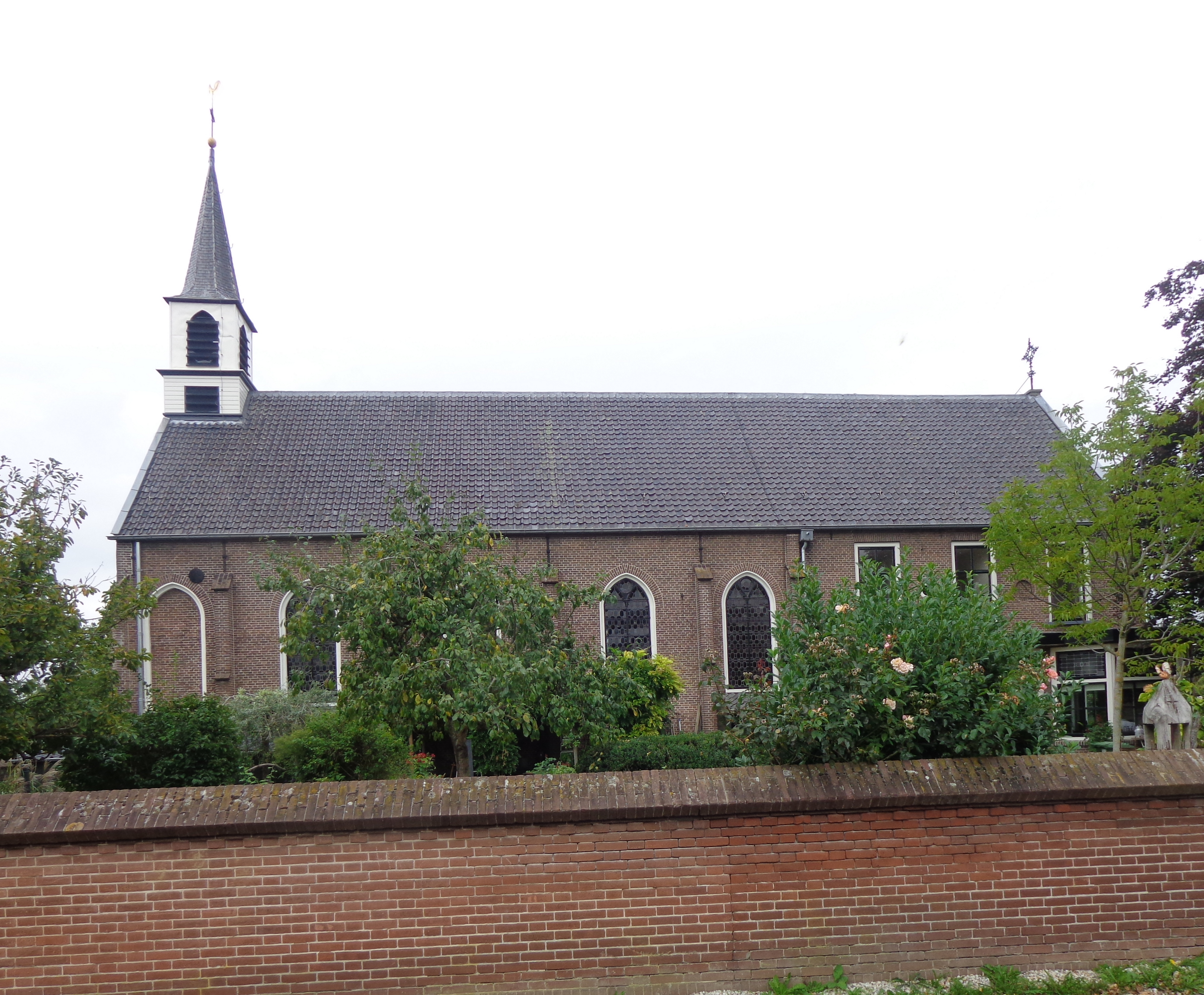
Catholic Church in Rumpt
