= Francis Dickoh =

Danish-born Ghanaian footballer (born 1982)

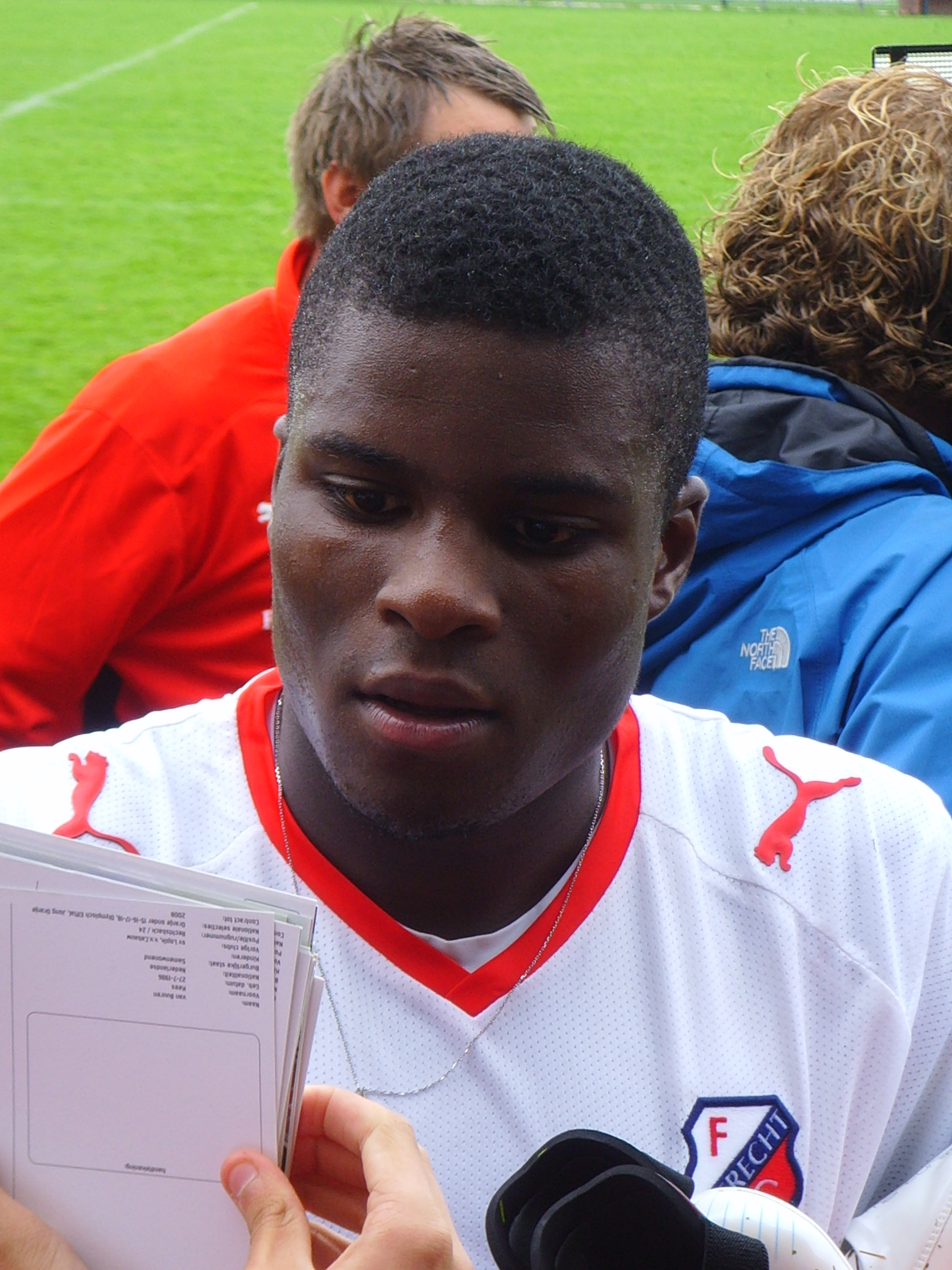
- Dickoh, while with FC Utrecht

Personal information
- Full name: Francis Dickoh
- Date of birth: 13 December 1982 (age 43)
- Place of birth: Copenhagen, Denmark
- Height: 1.87 m (6 ft 2 in)
- Position: Centre-back

Youth career
- 1999–2000: B.93
- 2001–2003: Farum

Senior career*
| Years | Team | Apps | (Gls) |
| 2003–2006 | Nordsjælland | 103 | (6) |
| 2006–2010 | Utrecht | 93 | (5) |
| 2010–2011 | Hibernian | 28 | (2) |
| 2011–2012 | Aris | 15 | (1) |
| 2013–2014 | Cercle Brugge | 6 | (0) |
| 2014–2016 | Midtjylland | 24 | (0) |
| 2016 | SønderjyskE | 5 | (1) |
| 2016–2017 | Lillestrøm | 0 | (0) |
| Total | | 274 | (15) |

International career
| 2005–2009 | Ghana | 14 | (0) |
- * Club domestic league appearances and goals

Francis Dickoh (born 13 December 1982) is a former professional footballer who played as a centre-back. Born in Denmark, he represented Ghana at international level. He works as an expert for Viaplay, covering both Premier League and the Danish Superliga. He also appears in World Cup and Euros coverage for the Danish public broadcaster Danmarks Radio and has previously featured as an expert in the sports media Mediano.

== Club career ==
Born in Copenhagen, Dickoh started his career in his native Denmark, playing for Farum BK, B.93 and FC Nordsjælland. He moved to the Netherlands in 2006, signing for FC Utrecht. Dickoh played 93 times in four seasons with Utrecht, but lost his place in the first team after suffering a calf injury early in the 2009–10 season. Dickoh claimed after leaving the club that he had a poor working relationship with the club's head coach Ton du Chatinier.

On 30 August 2010, Utrecht announced Dickoh was to sign for Scottish Premier League side Hibernian, pending a medical. The deal was confirmed by Hibs the next day. Dickoh made his debut in a 1–1 draw against Inverness CT. Hibs manager John Hughes praised the performance of Dickoh, who had replaced club captain Chris Hogg in the starting line up. Dickoh scored his first Hibs goal in a 3–0 win over defending Scottish Premier League champions Rangers at Ibrox Stadium on 10 November 2010.

On 20 August 2011, he signed for Aris. His contract ran out in 2013. He scored his first goal for Aris against Panathinaikos.

Dickoh signed for Danish club FC Midtjylland on 30 January 2014. It was reported on 11 December 2015 that Dickoh would leave Midtjylland at the end of the year.

Due to several injuries in the SønderjyskE squad, they signed a contract with Dickoh on 13 April 2016.

On 5 September, Dickoh signed for Norwegian club Lillestrøm. After his contract expired on 1 January 2017, he left the club.

== International career ==
Dickoh was born in Copenhagen to Ghanaian parents. He made his debut for the Ghana national football team on 14 November 2005 versus Saudi Arabia, and earned selection for the 2006 Africa Cup of Nations. As of 25 September 2017, he has played 13 times for the national team.

== Honours ==
Midtjylland

- Danish Superliga: 2014–15
