= 2000 Football League Trophy final =

2000 Football League Trophy Final
- Event: 1999–2000 Football League Trophy
Bristol City	Stoke City
1	2
- Date: 16 April 2000
- Venue: Wembley, London
- Referee: K.M.Lynch (Kirk Hammerton)
- Attendance: 75,057

The 2000 Football League Trophy Final (known as the Auto Windscreens Shield for sponsorship reasons) was the 17th final of the domestic football cup competition for teams from the Second and Third Division of the Football League. The match was played at Wembley on 16 April 2000, and was the last Football League Trophy final to be played there before the stadium closed for redevelopment. The match was contested by Bristol City and Stoke City. The match was won by Stoke City, with Graham Kavanagh and Peter Thorne scoring in the 2–1 victory.

== Background ==
The 1999–2000 season saw both Bristol City and Stoke City involved in the race for promotion to the First Division. Stoke had been in the top six for most of the campaign whilst Bristol battled with city rivals Bristol Rovers to gain a play-off spot. The two sides had played each other twice before the final. Firstly on 14 November 1999 at Stoke's Britannia Stadium the score ending 1–1 with goals from Nicky Mohan and Brian Tinnion. The second match at Ashton Gate also ended in a draw this time 2–2 with goals from Kyle Lightbourne, Graham Kavanagh and a brace from Tony Thorpe.

== Route to the final ==
Both sides had a fairly easy route to the final, Bristol City were handed a first round bye whilst Stoke over came Darlington 3–2 thanks to a Kyle Lightbourne golden goal. Bristol City beat Cheltenham Town 3–1 in the second round and Stoke overcame Oldham Athletic again via a golden goal. In the quarters Bristol City eased past Bournemouth on penalties as Stoke beat Blackpool 2–1. The semi-finals saw Bristol City cruise past Reading 4–0 whilst Stoke needed a late goal from James O'Connor to progress. In the area finals Bristol City beat Exeter City 5–1 over two legs and Stoke won equality as easily beating Rochdale 4–1.

=== Bristol City ===
First round: Bye

Second round: Bristol City 3–1 Cheltenham Town

Quarter final: Bristol City 1–1 (4–1 pens) Bournemouth

Semi final: Bristol City 4–0 Reading

Southern area final 1st leg: Bristol City 4–0 Exeter City

Southern area final 2nd leg: Exeter City 1–1 Bristol City

=== Stoke City ===
First round: Stoke City 3–2 Darlington

Second round: Oldham Athletic 0–1 Stoke City

Quarter final: Blackpool 1–2 Stoke City

Semi final: Chesterfield 0–1 Stoke City

Northern area final 1st leg: Rochdale 1–3 Stoke City

Northern area final 2nd leg: Stoke City 1–0 Rochdale

== Match review ==
Over 75,000 fans packed into Wembley to see Bristol City take on Stoke City in the Football League Trophy final for which Stoke fans dedicated to Stanley Matthews who had died in February 2000. Stoke made the bright start of the two sides enjoying a decent amount of possession and took the lead through Graham Kavanagh after 32 minutes after his shot beat the Robins 'keeper Billy Mercer at his near post. Leading 1–0 Stoke dropped deeper in the second half as they looked to cancel out the threat from the dangerous Scott Murray and Tony Thorpe. It looked to be working but with 15 minutes left Paul Holland headed in a corner to make the scores 1–1. However it was Stoke who had the final say, a counterattack by Stoke was halted when Bjarni Guðjónsson was fouled by Louis Carey to conceded a free-kick. Whilst Bristol complied about the awarding of the free-kick, Guðjónsson played a quick pass to Kavanagh who crossed in to Peter Thorne to earn Stoke their third win at Wembley.

== Match details ==
16 April 2000
13:30 BST

Bristol City	1–2	Stoke City
Holland 74'		Kavanagh 32'; Thorne 82'

Wembley, London
Attendance: 75,057
Referee: K.M.Lynch

Bristol City	Stoke City

GK	2	(England) Billy Mercer
DF	6	(England) Louis Carey	(substituted off) 87'
DF	27	(England) Andy Jordan
DF	46	(England) Keith Millen
DF	3	(England) Michael Bell
MF	17	(England) Aaron Brown	(substituted off) 68'
MF	26	(Scotland) Scott Murray	Booked
MF	10	(England) Paul Holland
MF	11	(England) Brian Tinnion
FW	20	(England) Peter Beadle
FW	21	(England) Tony Thorpe
Substitutes:
GK	15	(England) Steve Phillips
DF	43	(England) Kevin Amankwaah	(substituted on) 87'
DF	32	(England) Matt Hill
MF	33	(England) Joe Burnell
FW	34	(England) Damian Spencer	(substituted on) 68'
Manager:
(England) David Burnside

GK	1	(England) Gavin Ward
DF	5	(England) Nicky Mohan
DF	15	(Sweden) Mikael Hansson
DF	22	(Republic of Ireland) Clive Clarke
MF	2	(Iceland) Brynjar Gunnarsson
MF	8	(Republic of Ireland) Graham Kavanagh
MF	17	(Republic of Ireland) James O'Connor	Booked
MF	25	(Iceland) Bjarni Guðjónsson
MF	36	(Iceland) Arnar Gunnlaugsson	(yellow card) (substituted off) 62'
FW	9	(England) Peter Thorne
FW	12	(Bermuda) Kyle Lightbourne	(substituted off) 89'
Substitutes:
GK	14	(England) Carl Muggleton
DF	32	(Norway) Anders Jacobsen
DF	34	(England) Richard Dryden	(substituted on) 62'
MF	35	(England) Steve Melton
FW	31	(Scotland) Chris Iwelumo	(substituted on) 89'
Manager:
(Iceland) Guðjón Þórðarson

MATCH RULES

- 90 minutes.
- 30 minutes of extra-time if necessary.
- Penalty shoot-out if scores still level.
- Maximum of 3 substitutions.
