= 1999–2000 Stoke City F.C. season =

Stoke City
1999–2000 season
- Chairman: Keith Humphries, Gunnar Gíslason
- Manager: Gary Megson, Gudjon Thordarson
- Stadium: Britannia Stadium
- Football League Second Division: 6th (82 Points)
- Play-offs: Semi-final
- FA Cup: First Round
- League Cup: Second Round
- League Trophy: Winner
- Top goalscorer: League: Peter Thorne (24); All: Peter Thorne (30)
- Highest home attendance: 15,354 vs Burnley (29 January 2000)
- Lowest home attendance: 7,054 vs Millwall (22 August 1999)
- Average home league attendance: 11,246
Home colours

The 1999–2000 season was Stoke City's 93rd season in the Football League and sixth in the third tier.

For the third pre-season Stoke were looking for a new manager but the directors were finding it difficult with first choice Tony Pulis joining Bristol City openly admitting that he felt the board lacked ambition. Second choice was Gary Megson and he accepted the job offer as did John Rudge who became director of football. Stoke slowly built up some decent results but there were still tensions between fans and the board and so when news spread that an Icelandic business consortium wanted to take over it became a no-brainer. Unfortunately for Megson new chairman Gunnar Gíslason appointed his own man, former Iceland national manager Gudjon Thordarson. In came a number of Icelandic players and the side did well winning the Football League Trophy and reached the play-offs against Gillingham. After beating the "Gills" 3–2 in the first leg, two controversial refereeing decisions cost Stoke dearly and they lost the second leg 3–0.

== Season review ==
=== League ===
For the third consecutive summer, Stoke were hunting for a new manager, this time they had a clear favourite, Tony Pulis. However Pulis decided to join Bristol City after openly admitting that he felt the board lacked ambition. Second choice was Gary Megson, hard working and honest manager in the same mould as Pulis and he accepted Stoke's job offer. He appointed Nigel Pearson as his assistant and surprisingly John Rudge was made director of football after spending a long time at Port Vale. There was little expectation as the season began with some steady if unspectacular results and by the end of August Lárus Sigurðsson was sold to West Bromwich Albion for £350,000. Peter Thorne was proving to be a top player in the Second Division he scored the first few of his 30 goals. Stoke then went on a nine match unbeaten run and lifted themselves into the play-offs. In October news spread that a group of Icelandic businessmen were interested in taking control of the club and by mid November Stoke fans had their wishes granted and Gunnar Gíslason completed the Icelandic takeover under the name of Stoke Holding.

Gary Megson through no fault of his own was replaced by Gudjon Thordarson and in came a number of Icelandic players and the new era began well with Stoke beating Wycombe Wanderers 4–0 away. There was now a much better feeling about the club with the injection of new money and players but this was knocked back greatly in early 2000. On 23 February 2000 arguably one of the greatest footballers the world has ever seen Stanley Matthews died at the age of 85. Matthews was not just a club legend but also to Stoke-on-Trent as a whole. He was remembered in a perfect way with Stoke beating Chesterfield 5–1 with Thorne scoring four goals.

Stoke maintained their form from this match and went unbeaten until the final match of the season but despite a 1–0 defeat at Reading Stoke finished two points above Bristol Rovers and entered the play-offs. Their opponents were Gillingham and in the first leg 22,124 saw Stoke make a great start going into a 2–0 lead thanks to Arnar Gunnlaugsson and Kyle Lightbourne Gillingham pulled one back but Thorne restored Stoke's two goal advantage. Andy Hessenthaler then scored in injury time meaning the second leg would be a very tough match. In the second leg at Priestfield Stadium referee Rob Styles sent off both Graham Kavanagh and Clive Clarke for minor offences and Gillingham went on to win 3–0.

=== FA Cup ===
Another early exit for Stoke this season, defeated 2–0 away at Blackpool.

=== League Cup ===
After beating last seasons opponents Macclesfield Town Stoke lost 3–1 to Premier League Sheffield Wednesday.

=== League Trophy ===
Stoke began their Football League Trophy campaign on a cold December night against Third Division Darlington at the Britannia Stadium. With the scores level after normal time Kyle Lightbourne scored a golden goal to send Stoke through. Away wins over Oldham Athletic, Blackpool and Chesterfield saw Stoke in the area final against Rochdale. A 3–1 win in the first leg was followed by a 1–0 win in the second earning a place in the final against Bristol City. A crowd of 75,057 at Wembley saw Graham Kavanagh opened the scoring for Stoke before Paul Holland equalised for the Robins. Peter Thorne scored a close range winner for Stoke after 82 minutes earning Stoke their second Football League Trophy win.

== Final league table ==
| Pos | Team | Pld | W | D | L | GF | GA | GD | Pts | Promotion or relegation |
|---|---|---|---|---|---|---|---|---|---|---|
| 4 | Wigan Athletic | 46 | 22 | 17 | 7 | 72 | 38 | +34 | 83 | Qualification for the Second Division play-offs |
| 5 | Millwall | 46 | 23 | 13 | 10 | 76 | 50 | +26 | 82 | Qualification for the Second Division play-offs |
| 6 | Stoke City | 46 | 23 | 13 | 10 | 68 | 42 | +26 | 82 | Qualification for the Second Division play-offs |
| 7 | Bristol Rovers | 46 | 23 | 11 | 12 | 69 | 45 | +24 | 80 | |
| 8 | Notts County | 46 | 18 | 11 | 17 | 61 | 55 | +6 | 65 | |

Rules for classification: 1) Points; 2) Goal difference; 3) Goals scored

== Results ==
Stoke's score comes first

=== Legend ===
| Win | Draw | Loss |

=== Pre-season friendlies ===
| Match | Date | Opponent | Venue | Result | Attendance | Scorers |
|---|---|---|---|---|---|---|
| 1 | 17 July 1999 | Bolton Wanderers | H | 2–1 | 2,921 | Crowe, Connor |
| 2 | 21 July 1999 | Newport County | A | 2–1 | 878 | Oldfield (2) |
| 3 | 24 July 1999 | Hereford United | A | 0–0 | 634 | |
| 3 | 25 July 1999 | Newcastle Town | A | 4–1 | 1,966 | Connor (2), MacKenzie, Crowe |
| 4 | 28 July 1999 | Newcastle United | H | 1–2 | 7,171 | Jacobsen |
| 5 | 31 July 1999 | Chester City | A | 0–0 | 1,249 | |

=== Football League Second Division ===
| Match | Date | Opponent | Venue | Result | Attendance | Scorers |
|---|---|---|---|---|---|---|
| 1 | 7 August 1999 | Oxford United | H | 1–2 | 11,300 | Kavanagh 59' |
| 2 | 14 August 1999 | Preston North End | A | 1–2 | 11,465 | Thorne 8' |
| 3 | 22 August 1999 | Millwall | H | 3–1 | 7,054 | Thorne 15', Connor 51', Kavanagh 84' (pen) |
| 4 | 28 August 1999 | Burnley | A | 0–1 | 11,328 | |
| 5 | 30 August 1999 | Gillingham | H | 1–1 | 8,369 | Sigurðsson 87' |
| 6 | 4 September 1999 | Cambridge United | A | 3–1 | 4,007 | Connor 19', Oldfield 81', Thorne 86' |
| 7 | 11 September 1999 | Chesterfield | A | 2–0 | 4,285 | Lightbourne (2) 50', 90' |
| 8 | 18 September 1999 | Wigan Athletic | H | 1–1 | 11,195 | Lightbourne 48' |
| 9 | 25 September 1999 | Wrexham | A | 3–2 | 5,924 | Thorne 27', Lightbourne 50', Mohan 78' |
| 10 | 2 October 1999 | Scunthorpe United | H | 1–0 | 13,068 | Connor 90' |
| 11 | 9 October 1999 | Reading | H | 2–1 | 9,621 | Mohan 68', Jacobsen 89' |
| 12 | 16 October 1999 | Bournemouth | A | 1–1 | 5,990 | Clarke 62' |
| 13 | 19 October 1999 | Cardiff City | A | 2–1 | 6,146 | Thorne 23', O'Connor 58' |
| 14 | 23 October 1999 | Wrexham | H | 2–0 | 10,545 | O'Connor 58', Kavanagh 58' |
| 15 | 3 November 1999 | Notts County | H | 0–1 | 11,619 | |
| 16 | 6 November 1999 | Bury | A | 0–0 | 4,280 | |
| 17 | 14 November 1999 | Bristol City | H | 1–1 | 10,775 | Mohan 66' |
| 18 | 23 November 1999 | Wycombe Wanderers | A | 4–0 | 4,345 | Kavanagh 44', Daníelsson 45', Thorne 62', Mohan 71' |
| 19 | 27 November 1999 | Colchester United | H | 1–1 | 14,183 | Lightbourne 82' |
| 20 | 4 December 1999 | Oxford United | A | 1–1 | 5,700 | Thorne 79' |
| 21 | 18 December 1999 | Bristol Rovers | H | 1–2 | 10,379 | Keen 52' |
| 22 | 26 December 1999 | Blackpool | A | 2–1 | 5,274 | Robinson 21', Kavanagh 57' |
| 23 | 28 December 1999 | Oldham Athletic | H | 0–0 | 13,709 | |
| 24 | 3 January 2000 | Brentford | A | 1–0 | 6,792 | Thorne 60' |
| 25 | 8 January 2000 | Luton Town | H | 2–1 | 10,016 | Connor 24', Lightbourne 87' |
| 26 | 14 January 2000 | Preston North End | H | 2–1 | 10,285 | Kippe 3', O'Connor 87' |
| 27 | 22 January 2000 | Millwall | A | 0–1 | 11,548 | |
| 28 | 29 January 2000 | Burnley | H | 2–2 | 15,354 | Thorne 68', Davis (o.g.) 71' |
| 29 | 5 February 2000 | Gillingham | A | 0–3 | 7,801 | |
| 30 | 8 February 2000 | Luton Town | A | 1–2 | 5,396 | O'Connor 33' |
| 31 | 12 February 2000 | Cambridge United | H | 1–0 | 9,429 | Connor 31' |
| 32 | 19 February 2000 | Colchester United | A | 0–1 | 4,364 | |
| 33 | 26 February 2000 | Wigan Athletic | A | 2–1 | 9,429 | Kavanagh 28', O'Connor 77' |
| 34 | 4 March 2000 | Chesterfield | H | 5–1 | 11,968 | Thorne (4) 8', 18', 41', 61', Jacobsen 90' |
| 35 | 11 March 2000 | Notts County | A | 0–0 | 9,677 | |
| 36 | 18 March 2000 | Wycombe Wanderers | H | 1–1 | 9,738 | Gunnlaugsson 54' (pen) |
| 37 | 25 March 2000 | Blackpool | H | 3–0 | 10,002 | Gunnarsson 62', Mohan 69', Guðjónsson 71' |
| 38 | 28 March 2000 | Bristol City | A | 2–2 | 8,103 | Lightbourne 26', Kavanagh 39' |
| 39 | 1 April 2000 | Bristol Rovers | A | 3–3 | 9,312 | Thorne (3) 10', 62', 79' |
| 40 | 4 April 2000 | Oldham Athletic | A | 1–0 | 4,474 | Thorne 23' |
| 41 | 8 April 2000 | Brentford | H | 1–0 | 9,955 | Thorne 8' |
| 42 | 22 April 2000 | Bournemouth | H | 1–0 | 15,022 | Thorne 81' |
| 43 | 24 April 2000 | Scunthorpe United | A | 2–0 | 5,435 | Thorne (2) 24', 39' |
| 44 | 30 April 2000 | Cardiff City | H | 2–1 | 14,192 | Gunnlaugsson 3', O'Connor 69' |
| 45 | 3 May 2000 | Bury | H | 3–0 | 14,792 | Thorne (3) 11', 55', 81' |
| 46 | 6 May 2000 | Reading | A | 0–1 | 13,146 | |

=== Second Division play-offs ===
| Round | Date | Opponent | Venue | Result | Attendance | Scorers |
|---|---|---|---|---|---|---|
| Semi-final 1st Leg | 13 May 2000 | Gillingham | H | 3–2 | 22,124 | Gunnlaugsson 1', Lightbourne 8', Thorne 67' |
| Semi-final 2nd Leg | 17 May 2000 | Gillingham | A | 0–3 (aet) | 10,386 | |

=== FA Cup ===
| Round | Date | Opponent | Venue | Result | Attendance | Scorers |
|---|---|---|---|---|---|---|
| R1 | 30 October 1999 | Blackpool | A | 0–2 | 4,721 | |

=== League Cup ===
| Round | Date | Opponent | Venue | Result | Attendance | Scorers |
|---|---|---|---|---|---|---|
| R1 1st Leg | 10 August 1999 | Macclesfield Town | A | 1–1 | 2,551 | Keen 8' |
| R1 2nd Leg | 25 August 1999 | Macclesfield Town | H | 3–0 | 5,003 | Connor 59', Thorne 69', O'Connor 75' |
| R2 1st Leg | 14 September 1999 | Sheffield Wednesday | H | 0–0 | 9,313 | |
| R2 2nd Leg | 22 September 1999 | Sheffield Wednesday | A | 1–3 | 10,993 | Kavanagh 74' |

=== League Trophy ===
| Round | Date | Opponent | Venue | Result | Attendance | Scorers |
|---|---|---|---|---|---|---|
| R1 | 8 December 1999 | Darlington | H | 3–2 (aet) | 3,341 | Lightbourne (2) 25', 93', Reed 40' (o.g.) |
| R2 | 18 January 2000 | Oldham Athletic | A | 1–0 (aet) | 4,682 | O'Connor 116' |
| Quarter final | 25 January 2000 | Blackpool | A | 2–1 | 4,943 | Gunnarsson 19', Kavanagh 79' |
| Semi final | 15 February 2000 | Chesterfield | A | 1–0 | 3,825 | O'Connor 82' |
| Area final 1st Leg | 14 March 2000 | Rochdale | A | 3–1 | 4,241 | Hansson 4', Thorne (2) 21', 27' |
| Area final 2nd Leg | 22 March 2000 | Rochdale | H | 1–0 | 16,876 | Thorne 86' |
| Final | 16 April 2000 | Bristol City | N | 2–1 | 75,057 | Kavanagh 32', Thorne 82' |

== Squad statistics ==
| No. | Pos. | Name | League | | FA Cup | | League Cup | | League Trophy | | Play-offs | | Total | | Discipline | |
| No. | Pos. | Name | Apps | Goals | Apps | Goals | Apps | Goals | Apps | Goals | Apps | Goals | Apps | Goals | Yellow card | Red card |
|---|---|---|---|---|---|---|---|---|---|---|---|---|---|---|---|---|
| 1 | GK | (England) Gavin Ward | 46 | 0 | 1 | 0 | 4 | 0 | 7 | 0 | 2 | 0 | 60 | 0 | 1 | 0 |
| 2 | DF | (England) Jason Kavanagh | 0 | 0 | 0 | 0 | 1 | 0 | 0 | 0 | 0 | 0 | 1 | 0 | 0 | 0 |
| 2 | MF | (Iceland) Brynjar Gunnarsson | 21(1) | 1 | 0 | 0 | 0 | 0 | 6 | 1 | 2 | 0 | 29(1) | 2 | 3 | 0 |
| 3 | MF | (England) Bryan Small | 5(3) | 0 | 0 | 0 | 1 | 0 | 0 | 0 | 0 | 0 | 6(3) | 0 | 0 | 0 |
| 4 | DF | (England) Phil Robinson | 14(8) | 1 | 1 | 0 | 2 | 0 | 1(1) | 0 | 0 | 0 | 18(9) | 1 | 0 | 0 |
| 5 | DF | (England) Nicky Mohan | 40 | 5 | 0 | 0 | 3 | 0 | 6 | 0 | 2 | 0 | 51 | 5 | 9 | 1 |
| 6 | DF | (Iceland) Lárus Sigurðsson | 5 | 1 | 0 | 0 | 2 | 0 | 0 | 0 | 0 | 0 | 7 | 1 | 3 | 0 |
| 6 | DF | (Iceland) Sigursteinn Gíslason | 4(4) | 0 | 0 | 0 | 0 | 0 | 2(2) | 0 | 0 | 0 | 6(6) | 0 | 0 | 0 |
| 7 | DF | (England) Chris Short | 14 | 0 | 1 | 0 | 2(1) | 0 | 0 | 0 | 0 | 0 | 17(1) | 0 | 3 | 0 |
| 8 | MF | (Republic of Ireland) Graham Kavanagh | 44(1) | 7 | 1 | 0 | 4 | 1 | 7 | 2 | 2 | 0 | 58(1) | 10 | 9 | 1 |
| 9 | FW | (England) Peter Thorne | 41(4) | 24 | 1 | 0 | 3 | 1 | 4(1) | 4 | 1 | 1 | 50(5) | 30 | 3 | 0 |
| 10 | FW | (England) Dean Crowe | 0(6) | 0 | 0 | 0 | 0(2) | 0 | 1 | 0 | 0 | 0 | 1(8) | 0 | 0 | 0 |
| 11 | MF | (Australia) David Oldfield | 7(12) | 1 | 0 | 0 | 2(1) | 0 | 0(1) | 0 | 0 | 0 | 9(14) | 1 | 0 | 0 |
| 12 | FW | (Bermuda) Kyle Lightbourne | 35(5) | 7 | 1 | 0 | 3 | 0 | 4(2) | 2 | 2 | 1 | 45(7) | 10 | 7 | 1 |
| 14 | GK | (England) Carl Muggleton | 0 | 0 | 0 | 0 | 0 | 0 | 0 | 0 | 0 | 0 | 0 | 0 | 0 | 0 |
| 15 | MF | (England) Neil MacKenzie | 0(2) | 0 | 0 | 0 | 0 | 0 | 0 | 0 | 0 | 0 | 0(2) | 0 | 0 | 0 |
| 15 | DF | (Sweden) Mikael Hansson | 24(3) | 0 | 0 | 0 | 0 | 0 | 7 | 1 | 2 | 0 | 33(3) | 1 | 1 | 0 |
| 16 | FW | (England) Paul Connor | 15(11) | 5 | 0(1) | 0 | 2(2) | 1 | 2(1) | 0 | 1(1) | 0 | 20(16) | 6 | 3 | 0 |
| 17 | MF | (Republic of Ireland) James O'Connor | 42 | 5 | 1 | 0 | 3 | 1 | 7 | 2 | 2 | 0 | 55 | 8 | 14 | 0 |
| 18 | DF | (England) Ben Petty | 7(6) | 0 | 0 | 0 | 1 | 0 | 2(3) | 0 | 0 | 0 | 10(9) | 0 | 1 | 0 |
| 19 | DF | (England) Lee Collins | 0 | 0 | 0 | 0 | 0 | 0 | 0 | 0 | 0 | 0 | 0 | 0 | 0 | 0 |
| 20 | FW | (England) Steven Taaffe | 2 | 0 | 0 | 0 | 1 | 0 | 0 | 0 | 0 | 0 | 3 | 0 | 0 | 0 |
| 21 | MF | (England) Robert Heath | 0(3) | 0 | 0(1) | 0 | 0(1) | 0 | 0 | 0 | 0 | 0 | 0(5) | 0 | 0 | 0 |
| 22 | DF | (Republic of Ireland) Clive Clarke | 39(3) | 1 | 1 | 0 | 3(1) | 0 | 6 | 0 | 2 | 0 | 51(4) | 1 | 7 | 1 |
| 23 | DF | (England) Ashley Wooliscroft | 0 | 0 | 1 | 0 | 0 | 0 | 0 | 0 | 0 | 0 | 1 | 0 | 0 | 0 |
| 24 | DF | (England) Matthew Bullock | 4(3) | 0 | 0(1) | 0 | 0 | 0 | 0 | 0 | 0 | 0 | 4(4) | 0 | 0 | 0 |
| 25 | MF | (Iceland) Bjarni Guðjónsson | 7(1) | 1 | 0 | 0 | 0 | 0 | 1(2) | 0 | 1(1) | 0 | 9(4) | 1 | 2 | 0 |
| 26 | MF | (England) Jamie Cartwright | 0 | 0 | 0 | 0 | 0 | 0 | 0 | 0 | 0 | 0 | 0 | 0 | 0 | 0 |
| 27 | GK | (England) Stuart Fraser | 0 | 0 | 0 | 0 | 0 | 0 | 0 | 0 | 0 | 0 | 0 | 0 | 0 | 0 |
| 28 | DF | (England) Jamie Godbold | 0 | 0 | 0 | 0 | 0 | 0 | 0 | 0 | 0 | 0 | 0 | 0 | 0 | 0 |
| 29 | DF | (England) Richard Burgess | 0 | 0 | 0 | 0 | 0 | 0 | 0 | 0 | 0 | 0 | 0 | 0 | 0 | 0 |
| 30 | MF | (England) Kevin Keen | 20(3) | 1 | 1 | 0 | 3(1) | 1 | 0 | 0 | 0 | 0 | 24(4) | 2 | 3 | 0 |
| 31 | FW | (Scotland) Chris Iwelumo | 0(3) | 0 | 0 | 0 | 0 | 0 | 0(1) | 0 | 0 | 0 | 0(4) | 0 | 0 | 0 |
| 32 | DF | (Norway) Anders Jacobsen | 29(4) | 2 | 1 | 0 | 3 | 0 | 5 | 0 | 1(1) | 0 | 39(5) | 2 | 5 | 1 |
| 33 | MF | (Iceland) Einar Daníelsson | 3(5) | 1 | 0 | 0 | 0 | 0 | 1 | 0 | 0 | 0 | 4(5) | 1 | 0 | 0 |
| 34 | MF | (England) Richard Dryden | 11(2) | 0 | 0 | 0 | 0 | 0 | 0(1) | 0 | 1 | 0 | 12(3) | 0 | 0 | 0 |
| 34 | DF | (Norway) Frode Kippe | 15 | 1 | 0 | 0 | 0 | 0 | 5 | 0 | 0 | 0 | 20 | 1 | 1 | 0 |
| 35 | DF | (England) Sam Aiston | 2(4) | 0 | 0 | 0 | 1 | 0 | 0 | 0 | 0 | 0 | 3(4) | 0 | 0 | 0 |
| 36 | FW | (Iceland) Arnar Gunnlaugsson | 10(3) | 2 | 0 | 0 | 0 | 0 | 3 | 0 | 2 | 1 | 15(3) | 3 | 3 | 0 |
| 37 | GK | (England) Calvin Dixon | 0 | 0 | 0 | 0 | 0 | 0 | 0 | 0 | 0 | 0 | 0 | 0 | 0 | 0 |
| 38 | DF | (England) Steve Melton | 0(5) | 0 | 0 | 0 | 0 | 0 | 0(1) | 0 | 0(1) | 0 | 0(7) | 0 | 0 | 0 |
| – | – | Own goals | – | 1 | – | 0 | – | 0 | – | 1 | – | 0 | – | 2 | – | – |
