= Peter Thorne (English footballer) =

English footballer

Personal information
- Full name: Peter Lee Thorne
- Date of birth: 21 June 1973 (age 53)
- Place of birth: Urmston, England
- Position: Striker

Senior career*
Years	Team	Apps	(Gls)
1991–1995	Blackburn Rovers	0	(0)
1994	→ Wigan Athletic (loan)	11	(0)
1995–1997	Swindon Town	77	(27)
1997–2001	Stoke City	158	(65)
2001–2005	Cardiff City	126	(46)
2005–2007	Norwich City	36	(1)
2007–2010	Bradford City	77	(31)
Total		485	(170)
- * Club domestic league appearances and goals

Peter Lee Thorne (born 21 June 1973) is an English retired professional footballer, who played as a striker.

He played for a number of clubs in his career scoring just short of 200 goals. He started his career with Blackburn Rovers, but failed to make a single league appearance in four years before he left to join Swindon Town. He went on to play for Stoke City and Cardiff City, making more than 100 appearances for each. In 2005, he moved to Norwich City where he scored just one goal in two seasons and was on the verge of retiring until he moved to Bradford City. In two seasons, he was top scorer with Bradford, before leaving before the end of his third season and deciding to retire at the age of 36.

== Career ==
=== Early career ===
Thorne was born in Urmston, Lancashire and started his career at Blackburn Rovers. His only first team appearance came when he appeared in the 1994 FA Charity Shield at Wembley Stadium, he replaced Mark Atkins in the 64th minute of the 2–0 defeat against Manchester United. After a loan spell at Wigan Athletic, he signed for Swindon Town during the 1994–95 season, helping them reach the Football League Cup semi-finals but not being able to prevent relegation to the Second Division. However, his goals helped them win promotion back to First Division at the first attempt, and secure survival in the 1996–97 season.

=== Stoke City ===
Thorne joined Stoke City in July 1997 after manager Chic Bates paid £500,000 for his services. He was signed as a replacement for Mike Sheron who joined Queens Park Rangers. He top-scored with 16 goals in 1997–98 which was unable to prevent Stoke suffering relegation to the Second Division. He struggled for form in 1998–99 scoring 11 goals before he became a regular goalscorer in 1999–2000. He scored 30 goals as Stoke reached the play-offs where they lost out to Gillingham. During the season Thorne scored four goals against Chesterfield on 4 March 2000 becoming the first Stoke player to score four goals in a single match since Paul Maguire in May 1984, he also scored the winning goal in the 2000 Football League Trophy Final. Thorne again top-scored in 2000–01 with 19 goals as Stoke again failed in the play-offs this time against Walsall. Thorne began the 2001–02 season well scoring four goals in five matches before he left to join Graham Kavanagh at Cardiff City. In Total Thorne scored 80 goals for Stoke in 189 appearances.

=== Cardiff City ===
In September 2001, he was signed by Cardiff City for a club-record £1.7 million. His first season at the club was restricted due to injury but he still managed to finish the year with a total of 8 goals. The following season, 2002–03, he enjoyed a full season and linked up with the club's talisman striker Robert Earnshaw, the pair scoring a total of 52 goals between them, as they helped the club to win promotion via the play-offs. Thorne found the net 16 times during the season, including scoring against Bristol City in the first leg of the play-off semi-final.

Thorne remained a vital part of the team the next year and had scored 13 times when he fractured a bone in his foot meaning he missed the last three months of the season. Injuries would mean he rarely managed an extended run in the side during the rest of his time at the club and at the end of the 2004–05 season he was allowed to join Norwich City on a free transfer, although the Canaries would have had to pay a total of £200,000 had they reached the Premiership within two years of the transfer, to reduce the club's wage bill, with Thorne being the club's highest paid player at the time, after it was revealed they were in serious financial difficulties.

=== Norwich City ===
Thorne's career chances were limited at Norwich. He missed the start of the 2005–06 season through injury and then failed to establish himself as a first team regular, scoring just one goal during the season. In the summer of 2006, Norwich manager Nigel Worthington indicated that Thorne would be allowed to leave the club if a suitable offer was received. He remained on Norwich's books for the 2006–07 season, but was released at the end of the season. He considered retiring but subsequently signed for recently relegated League Two side Bradford City on a one-year contract. He scored twice for Norwich, with strikes against Watford in the league and Rotherham United in the League Cup.

=== Bradford City ===
A hip injury kept the striker out of the start of the campaign but he eventually made his belated league début in a 2–1 defeat of Lincoln City at Sincil Bank on 7 September 2007 where he had a goal disallowed. He scored his first goal for Bradford – his first for more than a year – in a 1–0 FA Cup victory over Chester City on 10 November 2007, before scoring his first league goal a week later at Dagenham & Redbridge. He scored Bradford's first league hat-trick in two years when he scored all three goals in a 3–0 victory over Notts County on 12 January 2008. With two games in three days, Thorne was rested for City's game with Rotherham United on 22 March 2008, before he scored the 150th league goal of his career two days later, when City beat Chesterfield 1–0. When City first signed Thorne, they included the option to extend his deal by a further year, and in March 2008, Thorne extended his contract to the end of the 2008–09 season.

Thorne started the 2008–09 season by scoring two goals in each of the first two league games as City defeated Notts County and Macclesfield Town. He added a fifth in the first three games to help City maintain an unbeaten start to the season with a 2–0 win against Rochdale. He missed a penalty in City's fourth game as they lost to Aldershot Town by one goal, but his form earned him a League Two player of the month nomination for August and he made amends by scoring another three goals in the next two games, as Bradford secured back-to-back victories. Although he failed to win the player of the month award, in September he was rewarded with the PFA fans' monthly prize. Thorne topped the goalscoring charts for the division at the start of the season, and had scored 11 by the start of November, but his form tailed off and he was also hampered by a shoulder injury. He waited four months for his next goal which came as a late consolation against Notts County at the end of February before he scored another two the following weekend in a 5–0 defeat of Aldershot Town. He finished the season with 17 goals. He signed a new one-year contract with Bradford in June 2009 and he was appointed as club captain ahead of the 2009–10 season, but he suffered an injury setback and was out of the team until January 2010, returning after scoring for the reserves. In March 2010, he was released from his contract by new manager Peter Taylor having failed to score during his third season with City. As a result, Thorne decided to retire from playing.

== Personal life ==
Thorne enjoys surfing, a hobby he took up as a teenager.

== Career statistics ==
Appearances and goals by club, season and competition
Club	Season	League			FA Cup		League Cup		Other		Total	
Club	Season	Division	Apps	Goals	Apps	Goals	Apps	Goals	Apps	Goals	Apps	Goals
Blackburn Rovers	1993–94	Premier League	0	0	0	0	0	0	—		0	0
Blackburn Rovers	1994–95	Premier League	0	0	0	0	0	0	1 (Note: Appearance in FA Charity Shield)	0	1	0
Blackburn Rovers	Total		0	0	0	0	0	0	1	0	1	0
Wigan Athletic (loan)	1993–94	Third Division	11	0	0	0	0	0	0	0	11	0
Swindon Town	1994–95	First Division	20	9	1	0	2	2	—		23	11
Swindon Town	1995–96	Second Division	26	10	5	0	1	0	2 (Note: Appearances in Football League Trophy)	1	34	11
Swindon Town	1996–97	First Division	31	8	0	0	3	2	—		34	10
Swindon Town	Total		77	27	6	0	6	4	2	1	91	32
Stoke City	1997–98	First Division	36	12	1	0	4	4	—		41	16
Stoke City	1998–99	Second Division	34	9	2	0	2	1	1	1	39	11
Stoke City	1999–2000	Second Division	45	24	1	0	3	1	6 (Note: Five appearances and four goals in Football League Trophy and one appearance and one goal in Second Division play-offs)	5	55	30
Stoke City	2000–01	Second Division	38	16	2	0	4	0	5 (Note: Three appearances and two goals in Football League Trophy and two appearances and one goal in Second Division play-offs)	3	49	19
Stoke City	2001–02	Second Division	5	4	0	0	0	0	0	0	5	4
Stoke City	Total		158	65	6	0	13	6	12	9	189	80
Cardiff City	2001–02	Second Division	26	8	0	0	0	0	2 (Note: Appearances in Second Division play-offs)	0	28	8
Cardiff City	2002–03	Second Division	46	13	4	1	1	1	4 (Note: One appearance in the Football League Trophy and three appearances and one goal in Second Division play-offs)	1	55	15
Cardiff City	2003–04	First Division	23	13	1	0	1	0	—		25	13
Cardiff City	2004–05	Championship	31	12	2	0	2	2	—		35	14
Cardiff City	Total		126	46	7	1	4	3	6	1	143	51
Norwich City	2005–06	Championship	21	1	1	0	1	0	—		23	1
Norwich City	2006–07	Championship	15	0	2	0	2	1	—		19	1
Norwich City	Total		36	1	3	0	3	1	—		42	2
Bradford City	2007–08	League Two	33	14	2	1	0	0	1	0	36	15
Bradford City	2008–09	League Two	37	17	1	0	1	0	0	0	39	17
Bradford City	2009–10	League Two	7	0	0	0	0	0	2	0	9	0
Bradford City	Total		77	31	3	1	1	0	3	0	84	32
Career total			485	170	25	2	27	14	24	11	561	197

== Honours ==
Swindon Town

- Football League Second Division: 1995–96

Stoke City

- Football League Trophy: 1999–2000

Cardiff City

- Football League Second Division play-offs: 2003
