= 2004–05 Cardiff City F.C. season =

Welsh football club season

Cardiff City
2004–05 season
- Chairman: Sam Hammam
- Manager: Lennie Lawrence
- Championship: 16th
- FA Cup: Third round
- Carling Cup: Third round
- FAW Premier Cup: Quarter-finals
- Top goalscorer: League: Peter Thorne (12); All: Peter Thorne (14)
- Highest home attendance: 17,006 vs Leeds United (2 October 2004)
- Lowest home attendance: 10,007 vs Crewe Alexandra (19 March 2005)
- Average home league attendance: 13,029

During the 2004–05 season Cardiff City played in the Football League Championship. It was the team's second year in the Championship since being promoted from League One. The season was also the last that manager Lennie Lawrence spent at the club before being replaced by Dave Jones at the end of the season.

== Team kit and sponsorship ==
Cardiff's kits continued to be designed by Puma. Their main shirt sponsor continues as Welsh housing company Redrow homes.

== Squad ==
No.	Pos	Nat	Player	Total		Championship		FA Cup		League Cup		FAW Premier Cup	
No.	Pos	Nat	Player	Apps	Goals	Apps	Goals	Apps	Goals	Apps	Goals	Apps	Goals
1	GK	(England) ENG	Tony Warner	28	2	26	0	2	0	0	2	0	0
2	DF	(Wales) WAL	Rhys Weston	29	0	23+2	0	2	0	2	0	0	0
3	DF	(England) ENG	Gary Croft	1	0	0+1	0	0	0	0	0	0	0
5	DF	(Wales) WAL	Rob Page	9	0	8+1	0	0	0	0	0	0	0
6	DF	(Wales) WAL	Danny Gabbidon	49	1	45	1	2	0	2	0	0	0
7	MF	(Wales) WAL	John Robinson	9	1	8	1	0	0	0+1	0	0	0
7	MF	(England) ENG	Neal Ardley	8	1	8	1	0	0	0	0	0	0
8	MF	(Republic of Ireland) IRL	Graham Kavanagh	33	3	28	3	2	0	2+1	0	0	0
9	FW	(England) ENG	Andy Campbell	15	0	6+6	0	0+1	0	1+1	0	0	0
10	FW	(Wales) WAL	Robert Earnshaw	5	2	4	1	0	0	1	1	0	0
10	FW	(England) ENG	Michael Boulding	4	0	0+4	0	0	0	0	0	0	0
11	FW	(England) ENG	Peter Thorne	35	14	28+3	12	2	0	2	2	0	0
12	MF	(Republic of Ireland) IRL	Willie Boland	24	0	18+3	0	0	0	3	0	0	0
13	GK	(Wales) WAL	Martyn Margetson	4	0	3+1	0	0	0	0	0	0	0
14	FW	(Republic of Ireland) IRL	Alan Lee	43	7	24+14	5	2	1	3	1	0	0
15	MF	(Jamaica) JAM	Richard Langley	27	2	24+1	2	2	0	0	0	0	0
16	DF	(England) ENG	Chris Barker	44	0	38+1	0	2	0	3	0	0	0
17	DF	(Wales) WAL	James Collins	40	2	32+2	1	2	1	4	0	0	0
18	MF	(England) ENG	Lee Bullock	26	5	8+13	3	0+1	0	3+1	2	0	0
19	MF	(Wales) WAL	Paul Parry	28	4	12+12	4	0	0	3+1	0	0	0
20	FW	(England) ENG	Gavin Gordon	0	0	0	0	0	0	0	0	0	0
21	DF	(Australia) AUS	Tony Vidmar	33	1	23+5	1	0+1	0	4	0	0	0
22	GK	(England) ENG	Arran Lee-Barrett	1	0	0	0	0	0	0	0	1	0
23	GK	(Scotland) SCO	Neil Alexander	19	0	17	0	0	0	2	0	0	0
24	MF	(England) ENG	Gareth Whalley	0	0	0	0	0	0	0	0	0	0
24	MF	(England) ENG	Darren Williams	20	0	17+3	0	0	0	0	0	0	0
25	MF	(Jamaica) JAM	Jobi McAnuff	48	3	42+1	2	2	1	3	0	0	0
26	MF	(England) ENG	Gary O'Neil	9	1	8+1	1	0	0	0	0	0	0
26	FW	(England) ENG	Neil Harris	3	1	1+2	1	0	0	0	0	0	0
26	MF	(Japan) JPN	Junichi Inamoto	16	0	13+1	0	2	0	0	0	0	0
27	MF	(Finland) FIN	Toni Koskela	1	0	0	0	0	0	0	0	1	0
29	MF	(Wales) WAL	Nicky Fish	1	0	0	0	0	0	0	0	1	0
30	DF	(Wales) WAL	Byron Anthony	3	1	0	0	0	0	1+1	1	1	0
31	MF	(Wales) WAL	Michael Parkins	1	0	0	0	0	0	0	0	1	0
32	FW	(Wales) WAL	Danny Thomas	2	0	0+1	0	0	0	0	0	1	0
33	FW	(Wales) WAL	Richard Ingram	0	0	0	0	0	0	0	0	0	0
34	DF	(Wales) WAL	Kirk Huggins	1	0	0	0	0	0	0	0	1	0
35	FW	(England) ENG	Cameron Jerome	32	7	21+8	6	1	0	0+2	1	0	0
36	MF	(Wales) WAL	Joe Ledley	32	3	20+8	3	0+1	0	2+1	0	0	0
	FW	(Wales) WAL	Stuart Fleetwood	2	0	0	0	0	0	0+2	0	0	0

== Transfers ==
=== Summer transfers in ===
Player	Club	Fee
Lee Bullock	York City	Free
Jobi McAnuff	West Ham United	£250,000
Rob Page	Sheffield United	Free

=== Summer transfers out ===
*Indicates the player joined after being released by Cardiff

Player	Club	Fee
Mark Bonner	Oldham Athletic	Undisclosed
Jason Bowen	Newport County*	Free
Gavin Gordon	Notts County	Undisclosed
Spencer Prior	Southend United*	Free
Gareth Whalley	Wigan Athletic*	Free

=== Loans in ===
Player	Club	Date Arrived	Return Date
Darren Williams	Sunderland	September 2004	October 2004
Gary O'Neil	Portsmouth	August 2004	December 2004
Darren Williams	Sunderland	October 2004	December 2004
Neil Harris	Millwall	November 2004	January 2005
Michael Boulding	Barnsley	January 2005	End of Season
Junichi Inamoto	West Bromwich Albion	March 2005	April 2005

=== January transfer window ins ===
Player	Club	Fee
Neal Ardley	Unattached	Free
Darren Williams	Sunderland	Free

=== January transfer window outs ===
Player	Club	Fee
Robert Earnshaw	West Bromwich Albion	£3 million

== Standings ==
Pos	Team	Pld	W	D	L	GF	GA	GD	Pts
14	Leeds United	46	14	18	14	49	52	−3	60
15	Leicester City	46	12	21	13	49	46	+3	57
16	Cardiff City	46	13	15	18	48	51	−3	54
17	Plymouth Argyle	46	14	11	21	52	64	−12	53
18	Watford	46	12	16	18	52	59	−7	52

Updated to match(es) played on 9 December 2011. Source: Football League Tables
Rules for classification: 1) points; 2) goal difference; 3) number of goals scored.

=== Results by round ===
Round	1	2	3	4	5	6	7	8	9	10	11	12	13	14	15	16	17	18	19	20	21	22	23	24	25	26	27	28	29	30	31	32	33	34	35	36	37	38	39	40	41	42	43	44	45	46
Ground	A	H	H	A	H	A	A	H	H	A	A	H	H	A	A	H	H	A	A	H	A	H	H	A	H	A	A	H	A	H	A	H	H	A	H	A	H	H	A	A	H	A	A	H	A	H
Result	D	W	L	L	L	L	D	L	L	W	L	D	W	D	D	D	W	D	L	L	L	W	L	L	D	D	W	W	D	W	L	W	L	L	W	D	L	D	D	W	L	L	D	W	D	W
Position	15:00		8	18	22	23	23	23	23	22	23	23	21	22	21	20	18	18	20	20	21	21	21	21	21	21	21	21	21	19	19	19	20	20	20	20	20	20	21	17	19	21	20	17	19	16
Points	1	4	4	4	4	4	5	5	5	8	8	9	12	13	14	15	18	19	19	19	19	22	22	22	23	24	27	30	31	34	34	37	37	37	40	41	41	42	43	46	46	46	47	50	51	54

A = Away; H = Home; D = Draw; L = Loss

== Fixtures and results ==
=== Championship ===
7 August 2004 1	Crewe Alexandra	2–2	Cardiff City	Crewe
15:00	Dean Ashton 5' (pen.); Michael Higdon 85'		44' John Robinson; 59' Alan Lee	Stadium: Gresty Road; Attendance: 7,339; Referee: Mick Thorpe (Suffolk)

10 August 2004 2	Cardiff City	2–1	Coventry City	Cardiff
19:45	Robert Earnshaw 54'; Lee Bullock 61'		29' Graham Barrett	Stadium: Ninian Park; Attendance: 14,031; Referee: Iain Williamson (Berkshire)

13 August 2004 3	Cardiff City	0–1	Plymouth Argyle	Cardiff
19:45			24' (o.g.) Lee Bullock	Stadium: Ninian Park; Attendance: 12,697; Referee: Paul Taylor (Middlesex)

21 August 2004 4	Ipswich Town	3–1	Cardiff City	Ipswich
15:00	Darren Bent 21'; Tommy Miller 67'; Ian Westlake 86'		55' Alan Lee	Stadium: Portman Road; Attendance: 21,828; Referee: Phil Joslin (Nottinghamshire)

28 August 2004 5	Cardiff City	0–1	Stoke City	Cardiff
15:00			37' Gifton Noel-Williams	Stadium: Ninian Park; Attendance: 12,929; Referee: Howard Webb (Yorkshire)

30 August 2004 6	Wigan Athletic	2–1	Cardiff City	Wigan
15:00	Nathan Ellington 16' (pen.); Jason Roberts 36'		66' (pen.) Alan Lee	Stadium: JJB Stadium; Attendance: 9,004; Referee: Eddie Ilderton (Tyne and Wear)

11 September 2004 7	Nottingham Forest	0–0	Cardiff City	Nottingham
15:00				Stadium: City Ground; Attendance: 21,607; Referee: Scott Mathieson (Cheshire)

14 September 2004 8	Cardiff City	0–3	Watford	Cardiff
19:45			11', 86' Danny Webber; 45' Neil Ardley	Stadium: Ninian Park; Attendance: 10,606; Referee: Mick Fletcher (Worcestershire)

18 September 2004 9	Cardiff City	0–2	Derby County	Cardiff
15:00			34' Marco Reich; 49' Ian Taylor	Stadium: Ninian Park; Attendance: 12,008; Referee: Steve Dunn (Bristol)

25 September 2004 10	Wolverhampton Wanderers	2–3	Cardiff City	Wolverhampton
15:00	Carl Cort 12'; Paul Ince 85'		11' Paul Parry; 48' Peter Thorne; 59' Graham Kavanagh	Stadium: Molineux; Attendance: 27,896; Referee: Mike Pike (Cumbria)

28 September 2004 11	Burnley	1–0	Cardiff City	Burnley
19:45	Richard Chaplow 88'			Stadium: Turf Moor; Attendance: 11,200; Referee: Keith Hill (Hertfordshire)

2 October 2004 12	Cardiff City	0–0	Leeds United	Cardiff
15:00				Stadium: Ninian Park; Attendance: 17,006; Referee: Phil Crossley (Kent)

16 October 2004 13	Cardiff City	2–0	Rotherham United	Cardiff
15:00	Peter Thorne 56', 75'			Stadium: Ninian Park; Attendance: 11,004; Referee: Kevin Friend

19 October 2004 14	Brighton & Hove Albion	1–1	Cardiff City	Brighton
19:45	Leon Knight 10'		81' Lee Bullock	Stadium: Withdean Stadium; Attendance: 6,112; Referee: Lee Mason (Bolton)

23 October 2004 15	Millwall	2–2	Cardiff City	Millwall
15:00	Jo Tessem 47'; Neil Harris 74'		40' Gary O'Neil; 68' Alan Lee	Stadium: The Den; Attendance: 10,476; Referee: Howard Webb (Yorkshire)

30 October 2004 16	Cardiff City	0–0	Leicester City	Cardiff
15:00				Stadium: Ninian Park; Attendance: 13,759; Referee: Mike Ryan (Preston)

2 November 2004 17	Cardiff City	4–1	West Ham United	Cardiff
19:45	Alan Lee 3'; Joe Ledley 16'; Paul Parry 54'; Jobi McAnuff 77'		69' (pen.) Marlon Harewood	Stadium: Ninian Park; Attendance: 14,222; Referee: Richard Beeby (Northampton)

6 November 2004 18	Rotherham United	2–2	Cardiff City	Rotherham
15:00	Paul McLaren 76'; Michael Proctor 80'		70' Joe Ledley; 74' Paul Parry	Stadium: Millmoor; Attendance: 5,119; Referee: Colin Webster (Tyne and Wear)

13 November 2004 19	Reading	2–1	Cardiff City	Reading
15:00	Dean Morgan 13'; Dave Kitson 39'		87' Cameron Jerome	Stadium: Madejski Stadium; Attendance: 16,107; Referee: Eddie Evans (Manchester)

19 November 2004 20	Cardiff City	0–1	Preston North End	Cardiff
19:45			14' Youl Mawene	Stadium: Ninian Park; Attendance: 10,950; Referee: Phil Crossley (Kent)

27 November 2004 21	Queens Park Rangers	1–0	Cardiff City	London
12:45	Danny Shittu 23'			Stadium: Loftus Road; Attendance: 15,146; Referee: Dermot Gallagher (Oxfordshire)

4 December 2004 22	Cardiff City	3–1	Gillingham	Cardiff
15:00	Cameron Jerome 13'; Peter Thorne 41' (pen.), 55'		33' Tommy Johnson	Stadium: Ninian Park; Attendance: 10,623; Referee: Kevin Wright (Cambridgeshire)

11 December 2004 23	Cardiff City	0–2	Sunderland	Cardiff
15:00			67' Dean Whitehead; 77' Liam Lawrence	Stadium: Ninian Park; Attendance: 12,528; Referee: Brian Curson (Leicestershire)

18 December 2004 24	Sheffield United	2–1	Cardiff City	Sheffield
12:00	Andy Liddell 69'; Andy Gray 76'		41' Neil Harris	Stadium: Bramall Lane; Attendance: 18,240; Referee: Andre Marriner (Birmingham)

26 December 2004 25	Cardiff City	1–1	Wolverhampton Wanderers	Cardiff
13:00	Cameron Jerome 17'		75' Kenny Miller	Stadium: Ninian Park; Attendance: 16,699; Referee: Paul Taylor (Middlesex)

28 December 2004 26	Watford	0–0	Cardiff City	Watford
15:00				Stadium: Vicarage Road; Attendance: 13,409; Referee: Peter Walton (Northamptonshire)

1 January 2005 27	Derby County	0–1	Cardiff City	Derby
12:00			27' Peter Thorne	Stadium: Pride Park; Attendance: 22,800; Referee: Alan Kaye (West Yorkshire)

3 January 2005 28	Cardiff City	3–0	Nottingham Forest	Cardiff
13:00	Peter Thorne 55' (pen.), 86'; Graham Kavanagh 90'			Stadium: Ninian Park; Attendance: 13,545; Referee: Phil Crossley (Kent)

15 January 2005 29	Leeds United	1–1	Cardiff City	Leeds
15:00	Simon Walton 14'		52' (pen.) Peter Thorne	Stadium: Elland Road; Attendance: 29,548; Referee: Neale Barry (Lincolnshire)

22 January 2005 30	Cardiff City	2–0	Burnley	Cardiff
15:00	Richard Langley 13'; Graham Kavanagh 74'			Stadium: Ninian Park; Attendance: 11,562; Referee: Trevor Kettle (Berkshire)

6 February 2005 31	West Ham United	1–0	Cardiff City	London
13:00	Carl Fletcher 89'			Stadium: Upton Park; Attendance: 23,716; Referee: Keith Stroud (Dorset)

12 February 2005 32	Cardiff City	2–0	Brighton & Hove Albion	Cardiff
15:00	Peter Thorne 16' (pen.); James Collins 19'			Stadium: Ninian Park; Attendance: 11,435; Referee: Mike Russell (Hertfordshire)

22 February 2005 33	Cardiff City	0–1	Millwall	Cardiff
19:45			20' (pen.) Danny Dichio	Stadium: Ninian Park; Attendance: 11,424; Referee: Mike Jones (Chester)

26 February 2005 34	Sunderland	2–1	Cardiff City	Sunderland
15:00	Gary Breen 4'; Marcus Stewart 42'		85' Tony Vidmar	Stadium: Stadium of Light; Attendance: 32,788; Referee: Tony Leake (Hertfordshire)

5 March 2005 35	Cardiff City	1–0	Sheffield United	Cardiff
15:00	Joe Ledley 75'			Stadium: Ninian Park; Attendance: 12,250; Referee: Dermot Gallagher (Oxfordshire)

12 March 2005 36	Coventry City	1–1	Cardiff City	Coventry
15:00	Stern John 16'		19' Lee Bullock	Stadium: Highfield Road; Attendance: 17,059; Referee: Lee Mason (Bolton)

15 March 2005 37	Cardiff City	0–1	Ipswich Town	Cardiff
19:45			62' (pen.) Tommy Miller	Stadium: Ninian Park; Attendance: 11,768; Referee: Ray Olivier (Sutton Coldfield)

19 March 2005 38	Cardiff City	1–1	Crewe Alexandra	Cardiff
13:00	Danny Gabbidon 21'		57' David Vaughan	Stadium: Ninian Park; Attendance: 10,007; Referee: Steve Tanner (East Sussex)

2 April 2005 39	Plymouth Argyle	1–1	Cardiff City	Plymouth
15:00	Hasney Aljofree 60'		22' Richard Langley	Stadium: Home Park; Attendance: 18,045; Referee: Richard Beeby (Northampton)

5 April 2005 40	Stoke City	1–3	Cardiff City	Stoke
19:45	Clint Hill 40'		26', 58' Cameron Jerome; 60' (pen.) Peter Thorne	Stadium: Britannia Stadium; Attendance: 12,785; Referee: Andy Hall (West Midlands)

9 April 2005 41	Cardiff City	0–2	Wigan Athletic	Cardiff
15:00			51' Jason Roberts; 86' Alan Mahon	Stadium: Ninian Park; Attendance: 16,858; Referee: Grant Hegley (Hertfordshire)

16 April 2005 42	Preston North End	3–0	Cardiff City	Preston
15:00	David Nugent 67', 79'; Richard Cresswell 85'			Stadium: Deepdale; Attendance: 15,141; Referee: Nigel Miller (Co Durham)

19 April 2005 43	Leicester City	1–1	Cardiff City	Leicester
19:45	David Connolly 33'		58' Neil Ardley	Stadium: Filbert Street; Attendance: 21,336; Referee: Paul Taylor (Middlesex)

23 April 2005 44	Cardiff City	2–0	Reading	Cardiff
15:00	Peter Thorne 12'; Cameron Jerome 30'			Stadium: Ninian Park; Attendance: 14,821; Referee: Scott Mathieson (Cheshire)

30 April 2005 45	Gillingham	1–1	Cardiff City	Gillingham
15:00	Matt Jarvis 72'		85' Paul Parry	Stadium: Priestfield Stadium; Attendance: 10,810; Referee: Alan Kaye (West Yorkshire)

8 May 2005 46	Cardiff City	1–0	Queens Park Rangers	Cardiff
13:00	Jobi McAnuff 27'			Stadium: Ninian Park; Attendance: 15,722; Referee: Andre Marriner (Birmingham)

=== League Cup ===
24 August 2004 Round 1	Kidderminster Harriers	1–1 (a.e.t.) (4–5 p)	Cardiff City	Kidderminster
19:45	Simon Brown 32'		28' Robert Earnshaw	Stadium: Aggborough; Attendance: 1,897; Referee: Brian Curson (Leicestershire)
	Penalties
	Ian Foster (penalty scored); Steve Burton (penalty missed); Richie Appleby (penalty scored); Dean Keates (penalty scored); Wayne Hatswell (penalty scored)		(penalty scored) Graham Kavanagh; (penalty scored) Robert Earnshaw; (penalty scored) Stuart Fleetwood; (penalty scored) Willie Boland; (penalty scored) John Robinson

21 September 2004 Round 2	Milton Keynes Dons	1–4	Cardiff City	Milton Keynes
19:45	Izale McLeod 85'		14' Peter Thorne; 21' Peter Thorne; 19' Lee Bullock; 72' Byron Anthony	Stadium: National Hockey Stadium; Attendance: 2,266; Referee: Mike Jones (Chester)

26 October 2004 Round 3	Bournemouth	3–3 (a.e.t.) (4–5 p)	Cardiff City	Bournemouth
19:45	James Hayter 8', 90'; Brian Stock 118'		24' Alan Lee; 49' Lee Bullock; 108' Cameron Jerome	Stadium: Dean Court; Attendance: 8,598; Referee: Alan Wiley (Staffordshire)
	Penalties
	Brian Stock (penalty missed); Alan Connell (penalty scored); John Spicer (penalty scored); James Hayter (penalty scored); Wade Elliott (penalty scored); Marcus Browning (penalty missed)		(penalty missed) Graham Kavanagh; (penalty scored) James Collins; (penalty scored) Lee Bullock; (penalty scored) Byron Anthony; (penalty scored) Alan Lee; (penalty scored) Chris Barker

9 November 2004 Round 4	Cardiff City	0–2	Portsmouth	Cardiff
19:45			47', 55' (pen.) Yakubu	Stadium: Ninian Park; Attendance: 13,555; Referee: Graham Laws (Northumberland)

=== FA Cup ===
8 January 2005 Round 3	Cardiff City	1–1	Blackburn Rovers	Cardiff
15:00	Alan Lee 35'		5' Morten Gamst Pedersen	Stadium: Ninian Park; Attendance: 14,145; Referee: Steve Dunn (Bristol)

19 January 2005 Round 3 (replay)	Blackburn Rovers	3–2	Cardiff City	Blackburn
20:00	David Thompson 9', 32'; Morten Gamst Pedersen 47'		24' Jobi McAnuff; 54' James Collins	Stadium: Ewood Park; Attendance: 9,140; Referee: Steve Dunn (Bristol)

=== FAW Premier Cup ===
25 January 2005 Quarter Final	Bangor City	1–0	Cardiff City	Bangor
	Byron Anthony 4' (o.g.)	BBC report		Stadium: Farrar Road

== See also ==
- List of Cardiff City F.C. seasons
- 2004–05 in English football
