= 2003–04 Cardiff City F.C. season =

Welsh football club season

Cardiff City
2003–04 season
- Chairman: Sam Hammam
- Manager: Lennie Lawrence
- First Division: 13th
- FA Cup: Third round
- League Cup: Fourth round
- FAW Premier Cup: Semi-finals
- Top goalscorer: League: Robert Earnshaw (21); All: Robert Earnshaw (26)
- Highest home attendance: 19,202 vs West Ham United (25 October 2003)
- Lowest home attendance: 13,666 vs Sheffield United (27 March 2004)
- Average home league attendance: 15,569

During the 2003–04 season Cardiff City played in Division One of the Football League. It was the team's first year in the Division One since being promoted from Division Two.

== Squad ==
No.	Pos	Nat	Player	Total		Championship		FA Cup		League Cup		FAW Premier Cup	
No.	Pos	Nat	Player	Apps	Goals	Apps	Goals	Apps	Goals	Apps	Goals	Apps	Goals
1	GK	(Scotland) SCO	Neil Alexander	26	0	25	0	0	0	0	0	1	0
2	DF	(Wales) WAL	Rhys Weston	26	0	24	0	1	0	1	0	0	0
3	DF	(England) ENG	Chris Barker	42	0	39	0	0	0	2	0	1	0
4	MF	(England) ENG	Gareth Whalley	25	2	22	2	1	0	1	0	1	0
5	DF	(England) ENG	Spencer Prior	8	0	7	0	1	0	0	0	0	0
6	DF	(Wales) WAL	Danny Gabbidon	44	3	41	3	1	0	2	0	0	0
7	MF	(Wales) WAL	John Robinson	34	2	34	2	0	0	0	0	0	0
8	MF	(Republic of Ireland) IRL	Graham Kavanagh	29	7	27	7	1	0	1	0	0	0
9	FW	(England) ENG	Andy Campbell	29	4	25	2	1	0	2	1	1	1
10	FW	(Wales) WAL	Robert Earnshaw	49	26	46	21	1	0	2	5	0	0
11	FW	(England) ENG	Peter Thorne	25	13	23	13	1	0	1	0	0	0
12	MF	(Republic of Ireland) IRL	Willie Boland	40	0	37	0	1	0	2	0	0	0
13	GK	(Wales) WAL	Martyn Margetson	25	0	22	0	1	0	2	0	0	0
14	FW	(Wales) WAL	Jason Bowen	5	0	2	0	0	0	2	0	1	0
15	MF	(England) ENG	Mark Bonner	21	0	20	0	0	0	1	0	0	0
16	DF	(England) ENG	Gary Croft	29	1	27	1	1	0	0	0	1	0
17	DF	(Wales) WAL	James Collins	23	1	20	1	0	0	1	0	2	0
18	DF	(Wales) WAL	Scott Young	0	0	0	0	0	0	0	0	0	0
19	MF	(Wales) WAL	Leyton Maxwell	2	0	1	0	0	0	1	0	0	0
19	MF	(Wales) WAL	Paul Parry	17	1	17	1	0	0	0	0	0	0
20	FW	(England) ENG	Gavin Gordon	18	1	15	1	0	0	1	0	2	0
21	DF	(Australia) AUS	Tony Vidmar	49	1	45	1	1	0	2	0	1	0
22	GK	(England) ENG	Arran Lee-Barrett	2	0	1	0	0	0	0	0	1	0
23	FW	(Wales) WAL	Stuart Fleetwood	5	1	2	0	0	0	1	0	2	1
24	FW	(Republic of Ireland) IRL	Alan Lee	25	4	23	3	1	0	0	0	1	1
25	MF	(Jamaica) JAM	Richard Langley	46	6	44	6	1	0	0	0	1	0
26	MF	(England) ENG	Julian Gray	9	0	9	0	0	0	0	0	0	0
26	MF	(England) ENG	Lee Bullock	11	3	10	3	0	0	0	0	1	0
27	MF	(Wales) WAL	Nicky Fish	2	0	0	0	0	0	0	0	2	0

== Transfers ==
=== Summer transfers in ===
Player	Club	Fee
Gary Croft	Unattached	Free
Richard Langley	Queens Park Rangers	Undisclosed
Alan Lee	Rotherham United	£850,000
John Robinson	Unattached	Free
Tony Vidmar	Middlesbrough	Free

=== Summer transfers out ===
Player	Club	Fee
Gareth Ainsworth	Queens Park Rangers	Undisclosed
Leo Fortune-West	Doncaster Rovers	Undisclosed
Des Hamilton	Grimsby Town	Undisclosed
David Hughes	Retired	–
Andy Jordan	Hartlepool United	Free
Andy Legg	Peterborough United	Undisclosed
Michael Simpkins	Rochdale	Free
Mark Walton	Released	–

=== Loans in ===
Player	Club	Arrival Date	Return Date
Julian Gray	Crystal Palace	August 2003	September 2003
Lee Bullock	York City	February 2004	End of Season

=== January Transfers in ===
Player	Club	Fee
Paul Parry	Hereford United	£75,000

=== January Transfers out ===
Player	Club	Fee
Leyton Maxwell	Swansea City	Undisclosed

== Standings ==
Pos	Team	Pld	W	D	L	GF	GA	GD	Pts
11	Stoke City	46	18	12	16	58	55	+3	66
12	Coventry City	46	17	14	15	67	54	+13	65
13	Cardiff City	46	17	14	15	68	58	+10	65
14	Nottingham Forest	46	15	15	16	61	58	+3	60
15	Preston North End	46	15	14	17	69	71	−2	59

Source: Soccerway
Rules for classification: 1) points; 2) goal difference; 3) number of goals scored.

=== Results by round ===
Round	1	2	3	4	5	6	7	8	9	10	11	12	13	14	15	16	17	18	19	20	21	22	23	24	25	26	27	28	29	30	31	32	33	34	35	36	37	38	39	40	41	42	43	44	45	46
Ground	A	H	A	H	A	H	A	A	H	H	A	A	A	H	H	A	H	A	H	H	A	H	A	H	H	A	H	A	H	A	A	H	A	H	H	H	A	H	A	A	H	A	H	A	H	A
Result	D	L	W	W	D	W	L	L	W	D	L	D	W	D	W	D	W	W	D	L	W	D	L	L	L	L	W	W	D	D	L	W	L	L	W	L	W	W	W	D	L	L	W	D	D	D
Position		19	14	16	11	6		14	9		11		11	12		9	8	8		9	7		8	10	11	12	11	10	11	12	12	11	11		14		12	10	10		11		11	11	11	13
Points	1	1	4	7	8	11	11	11	14	15	15	16	19	20	23	24	27	30	31	31	34	35	35	35	35	35	38	41	42	43	43	46	46	46	49	49	52	55	58	59	59	59	62	63	64	65

A = Away; H = Home; W = Win; D = Draw; L = Loss

== Fixtures and results ==
=== Division One ===
9 August 2003 1	Rotherham United	0–0	Cardiff City	Rotherham
				Stadium: Millmoor; Attendance: 8,176; Referee: Peter Walton (Northamptonshire)

16 August 2003 2	Cardiff City	0–2	Bradford City	Cardiff
			6' Andy Gray; 69' Lewis Emanuel	Stadium: Ninian Park; Attendance: 16,421; Referee: Lee Cable (Woking)

23 August 2003 3	Nottingham Forest	1–2	Cardiff City	Nottingham
	Marlon Harewood 70'		2' Robert Earnshaw; 7' Graham Kavanagh	Stadium: City Ground; Attendance: 23,407; Referee: Howard Webb (Yorkshire)

25 August 2003 4	Cardiff City	4–1	Derby County	Cardiff
	Alan Lee 30'; Graham Kavanagh 40' (pen.); Robert Earnshaw 55'; James Collins 70'		48' Mathias Svensson	Stadium: Ninian Park; Attendance: 15,091; Referee: Neale Barry (Lincolnshire)

30 August 2003 5	Walsall	1–1	Cardiff City	Walsall
	Jorge Leitao 52'		90' Gareth Whalley	Stadium: Bescot Stadium; Attendance: 8,974; Referee: Phil Joslin (Nottinghamshire)

13 September 2003 6	Cardiff City	5–0	Gillingham	Cardiff
	Peter Thorne 18'; Robert Earnshaw 21', 35', 45' (pen.), 74'			Stadium: Ninian Park; Attendance: 15,057; Referee: Adrian Hall (Birmingham)

16 September 2003 7	Reading	2–1	Cardiff City	Reading
20:00	Nicky Forster 62'; Steve Sidwell 79'		12' Peter Thorne	Stadium: Madejski Stadium; Attendance: 15,810; Referee: Mick Fletcher (Worcestershire)

20 September 2003 8	Sheffield United	5–3	Cardiff City	Sheffield
15:00	Michael Tonge 53'; Peter Ndlovu 62', 78' (pen.), 89' (pen.); Jack Lester 85'		46', 64' Robert Earnshaw; 69' Richard Langley	Stadium: Bramall Lane; Attendance: 21,323; Referee: Mike Riley (West Yorkshire)

27 September 2003 9	Cardiff City	3–0	Crewe Alexandra	Cardiff
	Peter Thorne 44', 85'; Robert Earnshaw 52'			Stadium: Ninian Park; Attendance: 14,385; Referee: Alan Wiley (Staffordshire)

30 September 2003 10	Cardiff City	0–0	Wigan Athletic	Cardiff
				Stadium: Ninian Park; Attendance: 15,143; Referee: Rob Styles (Dorset)

4 October 2003 11	Crystal Palace	2–1	Cardiff City	London
	Wayne Routledge 46'; Neil Shipperley 47'		60' Graham Kavanagh	Stadium: Selhurst Park; Attendance: 16,160; Referee: Clive Penton (Sussex)

14 October 2003 12	Sunderland	0–0	Cardiff City	Sunderland
20:00				Stadium: Stadium of Light; Attendance: 26,835; Referee: Alan Wiley (Staffordshire)

18 October 2003 13	Coventry City	1–3	Cardiff City	Coventry
	Michael Doyle 11'		28' Gareth Whalley; 32' Gavin Gordon; 40' (pen.) Robert Earnshaw	Stadium: Highfield Road; Attendance: 11,767; Referee: Eddie Ilderton (Tyne and Wear)

25 October 2003 14	Cardiff City	0–0	West Ham United	Cardiff
17:35				Stadium: Ninian Park; Attendance: 19,202; Referee: Mike Ryan (Preston)

28 October 2003 15	Cardiff City	3–0	Watford	Cardiff
	Robert Earnshaw 32'; Tony Vidmar 77'; Graham Kavanagh 87'			Stadium: Ninian Park; Attendance: 14,011; Referee: Eddie Evans (Manchester)

1 November 2003 16	Burnley	1–1	Cardiff City	Burnley
13:00	Richard Chaplow 52'		78' Robert Earnshaw	Stadium: Turf Moor; Attendance: 10,886; Referee: Howard Webb (Yorkshire)

8 November 2003 17	Cardiff City	3–1	Stoke City	Cardiff
	Robert Earnshaw 24', 71'; Danny Gabbidon 81'		59' Kris Commons	Stadium: Ninian Park; Attendance: 15,227; Referee: David Crick (Surrey)

22 November 2003 18	Wimbledon	0–1	Cardiff City	Milton Keynes
			15' Gary Croft	Stadium: National Hockey Stadium; Attendance: 5,056; Referee: Howard Webb (Yorkshire)

25 November 2003 19	Cardiff City	1–1	West Bromwich Albion	Cardiff
	Robert Earnshaw 65' (pen.)		49' Jason Koumas	Stadium: Ninian Park; Attendance: 17,678; Referee: Brian Curson (Leicestershire)

29 November 2003 20	Cardiff City	2–3	Ipswich Town	Cardiff
	Robert Earnshaw 58' (pen.); Peter Thorne 86'		29' (pen.) Tommy Miller; 33' George Santos; 82' Chris Bart-Williams	Stadium: Ninian Park; Attendance: 17,833; Referee: Andy Hall (West Midlands)

6 December 2003 21	Stoke City	2–3	Cardiff City	Stoke
	John Eustace 38'; Ade Akinbiyi 74'		34', 40', 72' Peter Thorne	Stadium: Britannia Stadium; Attendance: 12,208; Referee: Tony Leake (Hertfordshire)

9 December 2003 22	Cardiff City	2–2	Preston North End	Cardiff
	Richard Langley 63'; Peter Thorne 90'		52' Ricardo Fuller; 84' David Healy	Stadium: Ninian Park; Attendance: 13,703; Referee: Mark Cooper

13 December 2003 23	Norwich City	4–1	Cardiff City	Norwich
	Darren Huckerby 34'; Iwan Roberts 54'; Craig Fleming 71'; Tony Vidmar 79' (o.g.)		59' Peter Thorne	Stadium: Carrow Road; Attendance: 16,428; Referee: Alan Butler (Cheshire)

20 December 2003 24	Cardiff City	1–3	Millwall	Cardiff
	Peter Thorne 30'		5' Andy Roberts; 65' Tim Cahill; 84' Peter Morgan	Stadium: Ninian Park; Attendance: 14,610; Referee: David Pugh (Wirral)

26 December 2003 25	Cardiff City	0–1	Walsall	Cardiff
12:00			70' Neil Emblen	Stadium: Ninian Park; Attendance: 17,531; Referee: Phil Crossley (Kent)

28 December 2003 26	Watford	2–1	Cardiff City	Watford
13:00	Scott Fitzgerald 61'; Lee Cook		53' Peter Thorne	Stadium: Vicarage Road; Attendance: 15,512; Referee: Mick Thorpe (Suffolk)

10 January 2004 27	Cardiff City	3–2	Rotherham United	Cardiff
	Peter Thorne 24'; Graham Kavanagh 38'; Robert Earnshaw 45'		3' Stewart Talbot; 9' John Mullin	Stadium: Ninian Park; Attendance: 14,021; Referee: Andre Marriner (Birmingham)

17 January 2004 28	Bradford City	0–1	Cardiff City	Bradford
			72' Richard Langley	Stadium: Valley Parade; Attendance: 11,132; Referee: Colin Webster (Tyne and Wear)

31 January 2004 29	Cardiff City	0–0	Nottingham Forest	Cardiff
				Stadium: Ninian Park; Attendance: 17,913; Referee: Peter Walton (Northamptonshire)

7 February 2004 30	Derby County	2–2	Cardiff City	Derby
	Ian Taylor 49'; Leon Osman 90'		60' Robert Earnshaw; 62' Graham Kavanagh	Stadium: Pride Park; Attendance: 20,958; Referee: Mike Pike (Cumbria)

14 February 2004 31	West Bromwich Albion	2–1	Cardiff City	West Bromwich
	Neil Clement 55'; Lee Hughes 85'		80' Alan Lee	Stadium: The Hawthorns; Attendance: 25,196; Referee: Lee Mason (Bolton)

21 February 2004 32	Cardiff City	4–0	Sunderland	Cardiff
	Graham Kavanagh 18'; Richard Langley 27'; Danny Gabbidon 46'; Alan Lee 80'			Stadium: Ninian Park; Attendance: 17,337; Referee: Phil Crossley (Kent)

28 February 2004 33	West Ham United	1–0	Cardiff City	West Ham
	Bobby Zamora 73'			Stadium: Upton Park; Attendance: 31,858; Referee: George Cain (Bootle, Merseyside)

2 March 2004 34	Cardiff City	0–1	Coventry City	Cardiff
			71' (pen.) Gary McSheffrey	Stadium: Ninian Park; Attendance: 14,376; Referee: Paul Armstrong (Berkshire)

13 March 2004 35	Cardiff City	2–1	Norwich City	Cardiff
	Paul Parry 17'; Robert Earnshaw 20'		55' Leon McKenzie	Stadium: Ninian Park; Attendance: 16,317; Referee: Jeff Winter (Middlesbrough)

16 March 2004 36	Cardiff City	2–3	Reading	Cardiff
	Robert Earnshaw 42'; Lee Bullock 72'		39' Ívar Ingimarsson; 45' Dave Kitson; 90' Dean Morgan	Stadium: Ninian Park; Attendance: 14,051; Referee: Mark Warren (Walsall)

20 March 2004 37	Crewe Alexandra	0–1	Cardiff City	Crewe
			70' (o.g.) Ben Williams	Stadium: Gresty Road; Attendance: 6,650; Referee: Ray Olivier (Sutton Coldfield)

27 March 2004 38	Cardiff City	2–1	Sheffield United	Cardiff
17:35	Richard Langley 45'; John Robinson 63'		25' Peter Ndlovu	Stadium: Ninian Park; Attendance: 13,666; Referee: Tony Leake (Hertfordshire)

3 April 2004 39	Gillingham	1–2	Cardiff City	Gillingham
	Chris Hope 59'		36' Robert Earnshaw; 86' Lee Bullock	Stadium: Priestfield Stadium; Attendance: 7,852; Referee: Mick Thorpe (Suffolk)

7 April 2004 40	Millwall	0–0	Cardiff City	Millwall
				Stadium: The Den; Attendance: 9,584; Referee: Mick Fletcher (Worcestershire)

10 April 2004 41	Cardiff City	0–2	Crystal Palace	Cardiff
			55' Andrew Johnson; 87' Wayne Routledge	Stadium: Ninian Park; Attendance: 16,656; Referee: Trevor Parkes (West Midlands)

13 April 2004 42	Wigan Athletic	3–0	Cardiff City	Wigan
	Jason Roberts 36'; Nathan Ellington 54'; Jason Roberts 58'			Stadium: JJB Stadium; Attendance: 8,052; Referee: Andy Penn (West Midlands)

17 April 2004 43	Cardiff City	2–0	Burnley	Cardiff
	Richard Langley 78' (pen.); Andy Campbell 80'			Stadium: Ninian Park; Attendance: 13,525; Referee: Mike Jones (Chester)

24 April 2004 44	Preston North End	2–2	Cardiff City	Preston
	Eddie Lewis 15'; Paul McKenna 46'		51' Andy Campbell; 56' Danny Gabbidon	Stadium: Deepdale; Attendance: 11,972; Referee: Alan Kaye (West Yorkshire)

1 May 2004 45	Cardiff City	1–1	Wimbledon	Cardiff
	John Robinson 82'		83' Mark Williams	Stadium: Ninian Park; Attendance: 15,337; Referee: Mark Cooper

9 May 2004 46	Ipswich Town	1–1	Cardiff City	Ipswich
	Shefki Kuqi 26'		41' Lee Bullock	Stadium: Portman Road; Attendance: 28,703; Referee: Richard Beeby (Northampton)

=== League Cup ===
12 August 2003 Round 1	Cardiff City	4–1	Leyton Orient	Cardiff
	Robert Earnshaw 39', 40', 55'; Andy Campbell 56'		75' Jabo Ibehre	Stadium: Ninian Park; Attendance: 4,503; Referee: Mark Warren (Walsall)

23 September 2003 Round 2	Cardiff City	2–3	West Ham United	Cardiff
	Robert Earnshaw 12', 25'		45' (pen.), 64', 88' Jermain Defoe	Stadium: Ninian Park; Attendance: 10,724; Referee: Andy D'Urso (Billericay)

=== FA Cup ===
3 January 2004 Round 3	Cardiff City	0–1	Sheffield United	Cardiff
			74' Wayne Allison	Stadium: Ninian Park; Attendance: 10,525; Referee: Paul Taylor (Middlesex)

=== FAW Premier Cup ===
26 January 2004 Quarter Final	Newport County	0–1	Cardiff City	Newport
		BBC report	Stuart Fleetwood	Stadium: Newport Stadium; Attendance: 812

24 March 2004 Semi Final	Wrexham	2–2 (a.e.t.) (7–6 p)	Cardiff City	Wrexham
19:00	Chris Llewellyn 75'; Chris Armstrong 90'	BBC report Wrexham report	35' Alan Lee; 83' Andy Campbell	Stadium: The Racecourse; Attendance: 1,626; Referee: Mark Whitby (Swansea)
	Penalties
	Steve Roberts (penalty scored)		(penalty missed) Tony Vidmar

== See also ==
- List of Cardiff City F.C. seasons
- 2003–04 in English football
