= Kyle Lightbourne =

Bermudian footballer (born 1968)

Personal information
- Full name: Kyle Lavince Lightbourne
- Date of birth: 29 September 1968 (age 58)
- Place of birth: Hamilton, Bermuda
- Height: 6 ft 2 in (1.88 m)
- Position: Forward

Youth career
- Pembroke Hamilton

Senior career*
Years	Team	Apps	(Gls)
1986–1992	PHC Zebras		
1992–1993	Scarborough	19	(3)
1993–1997	Walsall	165	(65)
1997–1998	Coventry City	7	(0)
1998	→ Fulham (loan)	4	(2)
1998–2001	Stoke City	111	(21)
2001	→ Swindon Town (loan)	2	(0)
2001	→ Cardiff City (loan)	3	(0)
2001	IFK Norrköping	0	(0)
2001–2003	Macclesfield Town	73	(15)
2002	→ Hull City (loan)	4	(0)
2003–2007	PHC Zebras		
2007–2009	Bermuda Hogges	12	(0)
2008	→ PHC Zebras (loan)	1	(1)
Total		401	(107)

International career
1989–2004	Bermuda	18	(8)

Managerial career
- 2004–2007: Bermuda (assistant manager ?)
- 2007–2009: Bermuda Hogges (player-manager)
- 2007–2011: PHC Zebras
- 2012–2013: Robin Hood
- 2017–2023: Bermuda
- * Club domestic league appearances and goals

Kyle Lavince Lightbourne (born 29 September 1968) is a Bermudian professional footballer who played as a forward for Scarborough, Walsall, Coventry City, Fulham, Stoke City, Swindon Town, Cardiff City, Macclesfield Town and Hull City. At international level, he made 18 appearances for the Bermuda national team scoring 8 goals.

== Club career ==
Lightbourne was born in Hamilton, Bermuda and played for PHC Zebras before moving to England to play for Scarborough at the age of 23. He played 21 times for Scarborough before joining Walsall in September 1993. Lightbourne soon struck up a partnership with Kevin Wilson and the pair became prolific goalscorers and earned Walsall some success. He scored 9 goals in 41 appearances in 1993–94 before scoring 27 goals in 1994–95 as Walsall gained promotion. He scored 24 goals in 1995–96 and 25 in 1996–97.

This earned him a lucrative move to Premier League side Coventry City for a fee of £500,000. However his chances at Highfield Road were limited and after making only 7 appearances plus a loan spell at Fulham he moved to Stoke City in February 1998. He didn't get off to the best of starts with Stoke as he struggled with illness and form as Stoke suffered relegation from the First Division in 1997–98. He improved in 1998–99, netting eight goals. In 1999–2000 Lightbourne scored 10 goals in 52 appearances as Stoke reached the play-offs where they lost to Gillingham. He played in the 2000 Football League Trophy Final at Wembley as Stoke beat Bristol City 2–1. In 2000–01 he found his chances of first team football more restricted but still managed five goals in 28 appearances. In the latter part of the season he spent spells on loan at Swindon Town and Cardiff City.

He was released by Stoke in the summer of 2001 and after a brief unsuccessful spell in Sweden with IFK Norrköping he played two seasons with Macclesfield Town and had a short loan spell at Hull City before returning to Bermuda.

In 2007, Lightbourne joined Shaun Goater as part of the management team of USL side Bermuda Hogges, making 12 appearances for the team. He officially retired from football in 2009.

== International career ==
Lightbourne made his debut for Bermuda in 1989 and represented his country in 11 FIFA World Cup qualification matches.

His final international match was a June 2004 World Cup qualification match against El Salvador.

== Managerial career ==
Lightbourne was coach at PHC Zebras before resigning in summer 2011. In June 2012, Lightbourne was named manager of local side Robin Hood. He missed out on a place at the Walsall bench in 2013. Lightbourne became manager of the Bermuda national team on 8 September 2017 replacing Andrew Bascome.

== Cricket career ==
Lightbourne was a member of the ICC Associates squad at the inaugural 1988 Youth Cricket World Cup. He played five games for Bermuda at the 1990 ICC Trophy, during which he took 11 wickets at an average of 16.81. He was part of a Bermuda side that played the touring Australians in 1991.

== Career statistics ==
Appearances and goals by club, season and competition
Club	Season	League			FA Cup		League Cup		Other (Note: Includes Football League play-offs, and Football League Trophy.)		Total	
Club	Season	Division	Apps	Goals	Apps	Goals	Apps	Goals	Apps	Goals	Apps	Goals
Scarborough	1992–93	Third Division	19	3	0	0	1	0	1	0	21	3
Walsall	1993–94	Third Division	35	7	4	2	0	0	2	0	41	9
Walsall	1994–95	Third Division	42	23	5	3	4	1	1	0	52	27
Walsall	1995–96	Second Division	43	15	5	3	2	0	3	6	53	24
Walsall	1996–97	Second Division	45	20	4	4	2	1	1	0	52	25
Walsall	Total		165	65	18	12	8	2	7	6	198	85
Coventry City	1997–98	Premier League	7	0	0	0	3	0	0	0	10	0
Fulham (loan)	1997–98	Second Division	4	2	0	0	0	0	1	1	5	3
Stoke City	1997–98	First Division	13	2	0	0	0	0	0	0	13	2
Stoke City	1998–99	Second Division	36	7	1	1	1	0	1	0	39	8
Stoke City	1999–2000	Second Division	40	7	1	0	3	0	8	3	52	10
Stoke City	2000–01	Second Division	22	5	1	0	3	0	0	0	26	5
Stoke City	Total		111	21	3	1	7	0	9	3	130	25
Swindon Town (loan)	2000–01	Second Division	2	0	0	0	0	0	0	0	2	0
Cardiff City (loan)	2000–01	Third Division	3	0	0	0	0	0	0	0	3	0
Macclesfield Town	2001–02	Third Division	29	4	0	0	1	0	0	0	30	4
Macclesfield Town	2002–03	Third Division	44	10	3	2	2	1	1	0	50	13
Macclesfield Town	Total		73	14	3	2	3	1	1	0	80	17
Hull City (loan)	2002–03	Third Division	4	0	0	0	0	0	0	0	4	0
Bermuda Hogges	2007	USL Second Division	6	0	0	0	0	0	0	0	6	0
Bermuda Hogges	2008	USL Second Division	2	0	0	0	0	0	0	0	2	0
Bermuda Hogges	2009	USL Second Division	4	0	0	0	0	0	0	0	4	0
Bermuda Hogges	Total		12	0	0	0	0	0	0	0	12	0
Career total			400	105	24	15	22	3	19	10	465	135

== Managerial statistics ==
As of 21 November 2023

Team	From	To	Record				
Team	From	To	G	W	D	L	Win %
Bermuda	18 January 2017	30 June 2023	30	9	4	17	30.00

== Honours ==
Walsall

- Football League Third Division runner-up: 1994–95

Stoke City

- Football League Trophy: 1999–2000

Individual

- PFA Team of the Year: 1994–95 Third Division
