= Gavin Ward (footballer) =

English football player and coach (born 1970)

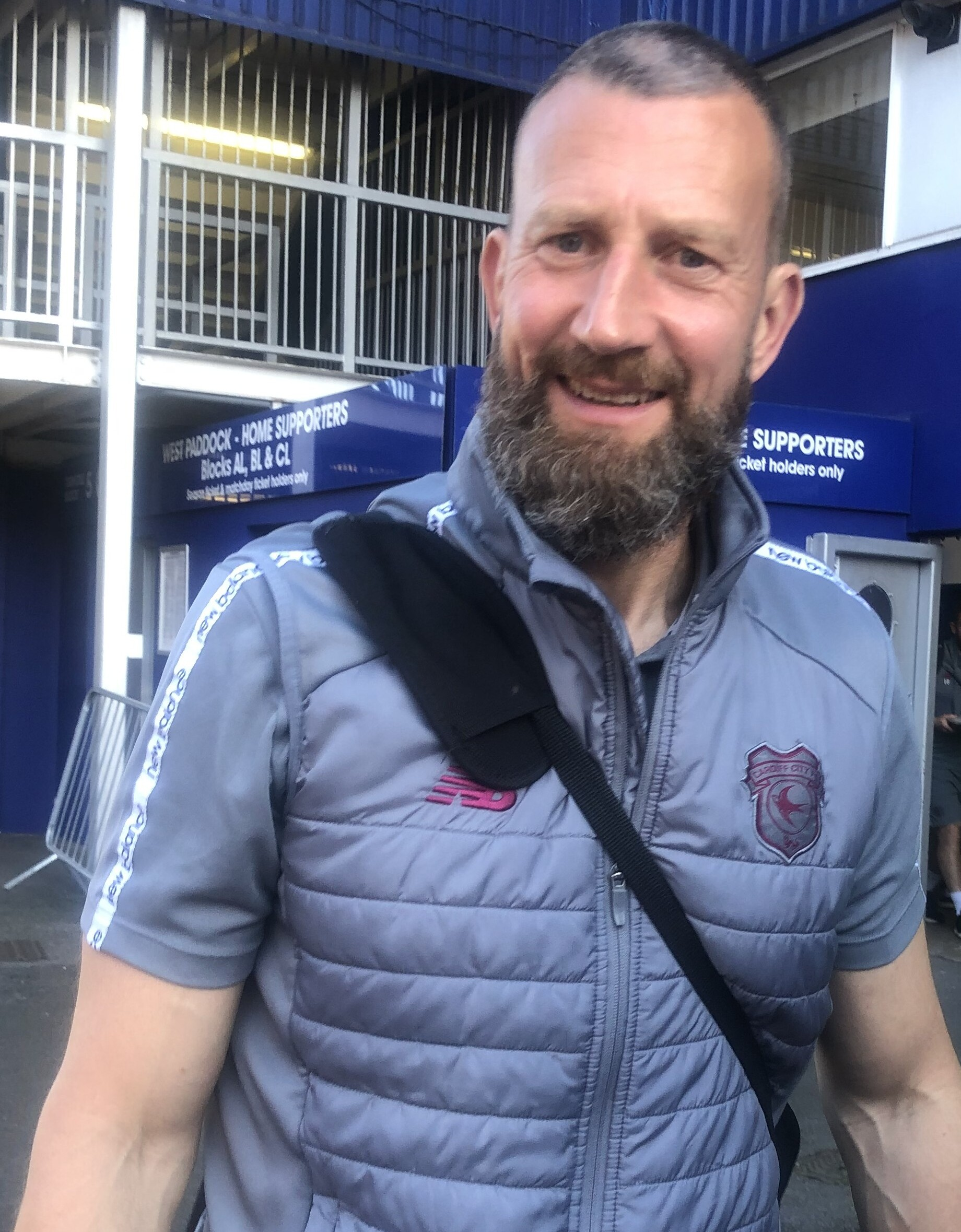
- Ward in 2025.

Personal information
- Full name: Gavin John Ward
- Date of birth: 30 June 1970 (age 56)
- Place of birth: Sutton Coldfield, England
- Height: 1.91 m (6 ft 3 in)
- Position: Goalkeeper

Team information
- Current team: Cardiff City (goalkeeping coach)

Youth career
- 1985–1987: Aston Villa

Senior career*
Years	Team	Apps	(Gls)
1987–1988	Aston Villa	0	(0)
1988–1989	Shrewsbury Town	0	(0)
1989	West Bromwich Albion	0	(0)
1989–1993	Cardiff City	59	(0)
1993–1995	Leicester City	38	(0)
1995–1996	Bradford City	36	(0)
1996–1999	Bolton Wanderers	22	(0)
1998	→ Burnley (loan)	17	(0)
1999–2002	Stoke City	79	(0)
2002–2003	Walsall	7	(0)
2003–2004	Coventry City	12	(0)
2004	→ Barnsley (loan)	1	(0)
2004–2006	Preston North End	7	(0)
2006–2007	Tranmere Rovers	38	(1)
2007–2008	Chester City	0	(0)
2008–2009	Wrexham	54	(0)
2009	Hednesford Town		
2009–2011	Gainsborough Trinity	7	(0)
2012–2013	Shrewsbury Town	0	(0)
Total		377	(1)

Managerial career
- 2009–2011: Gainsborough Trinity (assistant)
- 2011–2013: Shrewsbury Town (goalkeeping coach)
- 2013–2014: Nottingham Forest (goalkeeping coach)
- 2014–2016: Burton Albion (goalkeeping coach)
- 2016–2024: Queens Park Rangers (goalkeeping coach)
- 2024–: Cardiff City (goalkeeping coach)
- * Club domestic league appearances and goals

Gavin John Ward (born 30 June 1970) is an English former professional footballer and coach, who is currently interim goalkeeping coach at Championship side Cardiff City.

He played in the position of goalkeeper from 1987 until 2011. He notably played Premier League football for Leicester City as well as playing for Aston Villa, Shrewsbury Town, West Bromwich Albion, Cardiff City, Bradford City, Bolton Wanderers, Burnley, Stoke City, Walsall, Coventry City, Barnsley, Preston North End, Tranmere Rovers, Chester City, Wrexham, Hednesford Town and Gainsborough Trinity.

== Playing career ==
Ward was born in Sutton Coldfield and began his career with Aston Villa before moving on to Shrewsbury Town. He failed to make an appearance for either club and left for West Bromwich Albion where he made his professional debut in a League Cup match against Bradford City. He then moved to Cardiff City where he finally found regular football becoming a regular in the 1991–92 season and helped the "Bluebirds" win the Division Three title in 1992–93.

He made over 60 league and cup appearances for Cardiff in four seasons before moving to Leicester City for a transfer fee of £175,000 in 1993 where he help them to win promotion to the Premier League in 1994. After leaving Leicester he had a short spell at Bradford City before Bolton Wanderers paid £300,000 for his services in 1996, allowing Ward to again taste top-flight action. He spent three seasons at the Reebok Stadium acting as back-up to Keith Branagan. He spent the first half of the 1998–99 season on loan at Burnley before joining Stoke City on a permanent basis in March 1998. He instantly established himself as first choice at the Britannia Stadium and he played in all 60 of the club's fixtures during a hectic 1999–2000 season which saw Stoke win the Football League Trophy and reach the play-offs as Stoke lost controversially to Gillingham. He was second choice at Stoke in 2000–01 and 2001–02 and joined Walsall in the summer of 2002.

After spells at Walsall, Coventry City, Barnsley and Preston North End he joined Tranmere Rovers in June 2006. Ward made a bright start to the 2006–07, even managing to score a goal, which came from a free kick just outside his box in the 9th minute against Leyton Orient on 2 September 2006.

He was released by Tranmere in May 2007 and made the short journey to Chester, where he was backup and coach to John Danby. Ward's only competitive appearance for Chester was as a half-time substitute for the injured Danby against Crewe Alexandra in the Football League Trophy on 4 September 2007, with Chester going on to win a penalty shoot-out after a 1–1 draw. On 8 January 2008, Ward moved to arch-rivals Wrexham on a free transfer. He played in over 50 matches for the club before being released at the end of the 2008–09 season. Ward went on to play for Hednesford Town during the 2008–09 season.

== Coaching career ==
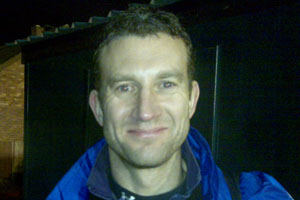
Ward after a Gainsborough Trinity game in January 2010.

Following the appointment of Brian Little as manager of Gainsborough Trinity, Ward was appointed Assistant Manager, as well as signing on as the club's reserve goalkeeper.

Ward retired from playing at the end of the 2010–11 season. On 18 July 2011, he left his post at Gainsborough to become Goalkeeping Coach at Shrewsbury Town. He was registered as a player after second-choice goalkeeper Joe Anyon picked up an injury in October 2012, with Ward taking his place on the bench.

On 4 July 2013, Ward agreed to be Goalkeeping Coach at Nottingham Forest.

On 27 September 2024, Ward agreed to be interim Goalkeeping Coach at Cardiff City following an eight-year stint at Queens Park Rangers.

== Career statistics ==
Appearances and goals by club, season and competition
Club	Season	League			FA Cup		League Cup		Other^{[A]}		Total	
Club	Season	Division	Apps	Goals	Apps	Goals	Apps	Goals	Apps	Goals	Apps	Goals
Aston Villa	1987–88	Second Division	0	0	0	0	0	0	0	0	0	0
Shrewsbury Town	1988–89	Second Division	0	0	0	0	0	0	0	0	0	0
West Bromwich Albion	1989–90	Second Division	0	0	0	0	1	0	0	0	1	0
Cardiff City	1989–90	Third Division	2	0	0	0	0	0	2	0	4	0
Cardiff City	1990–91	Fourth Division	1	0	0	0	0	0	0	0	1	0
Cardiff City	1991–92	Fourth Division	24	0	0	0	0	0	2	0	26	0
Cardiff City	1992–93	Third Division	32	0	1	0	0	0	3	0	35	0
Cardiff City	Total		59	0	1	0	0	0	7	0	67	0
Leicester City	1993–94	First Division	32	0	0	0	3	0	4	0	39	0
Leicester City	1994–95	Premier League	6	0	1	0	0	0	0	0	7	0
Leicester City	Total		38	0	1	0	3	0	4	0	45	0
Bradford City	1995–96	Second Division	36	0	3	0	6	0	1	0	46	0
Bolton Wanderers	1995–96	Premier League	5	0	0	0	0	0	0	0	5	0
Bolton Wanderers	1996–97	First Division	11	0	3	0	1	0	0	0	15	0
Bolton Wanderers	1997–98	Premier League	6	0	1	0	1	0	0	0	8	0
Bolton Wanderers	Total		22	0	4	0	2	0	0	0	28	0
Burnley (loan)	1998–99	Second Division	17	0	0	0	0	0	0	0	17	0
Stoke City	1998–99	Second Division	6	0	0	0	0	0	0	0	6	0
Stoke City	1999–2000	Second Division	46	0	1	0	4	0	9	0	60	0
Stoke City	2000–01	Second Division	17	0	0	0	3	0	2	0	22	0
Stoke City	2001–02	Second Division	10	0	1	0	0	0	1	0	12	0
Stoke City	Total		79	0	2	0	7	0	12	0	100	0
Walsall	2002–03	First Division	7	0	0	0	0	0	0	0	7	0
Coventry City	2003–04	First Division	12	0	3	0	0	0	0	0	15	0
Barnsley (loan)	2003–04	Second Division	1	0	0	0	0	0	0	0	1	0
Preston North End	2004–05	Championship	7	0	0	0	1	0	0	0	8	0
Preston North End	2005–06	Championship	0	0	0	0	0	0	0	0	0	0
Tranmere Rovers	2006–07	League One	38	1	1	0	1	0	0	0	41	1
Chester City	2007–08	League One	0	0	0	0	0	0	1	0	1	0
Wrexham	2007–08	League Two	22	0	0	0	0	0	0	0	22	0
Wrexham	2008–09	Conference Premier	32	0	0	0	—		3	0	35	0
Wrexham	Total		54	0	0	0	0	0	3	0	57	0
Career Total			370	1	15	0	21	0	28	0	434	1

A. The "Other" column constitutes appearances and goals in the Anglo-Italian Cup, Football League play-offs and Football League Trophy.

== Honours ==
Cardiff City

- Football League Third Division: 1992–93
- Welsh Cup: 1992–93

Bolton Wanderers

- Football League First Division: 1996–97

Leicester City

- Football League First Division play-offs: 1994

Stoke City

- Football League Trophy: 1999–2000
