= Matthew Bullock (footballer) =

English footballer

Personal information
- Full name: Matthew Bullock
- Date of birth: 1 November 1980 (age 45)
- Place of birth: Stoke-on-Trent, England
- Position: Midfielder

Youth career
- Stone Dominoes

Senior career*
Years	Team	Apps	(Gls)
1999–2002	Stoke City	7	(0)
2001	→ Macclesfield Town (loan	3	(0)
2002	Leek Town		
- * Club domestic league appearances and goals

Matthew Bullock (born 1 November 1980) is an English former footballer who played in the Football League for Macclesfield Town and Stoke City.

== Career ==
Bullock joined Stoke as a trainee from non-league Stone Dominoes and was made a member of the first team squad in 1999–2000. He made his debut away at Bournemouth in a 1–1 draw and went on to make a further six appearances for Stoke. During the middle of the season he suffered an ACL injury. After spending the start of the next season in the reserves he left for Macclesfield Town on loan. He played three matches for the "Silkmen" and joined non-league Leek Town in 2002.

== Career statistics ==
Appearances and goals by club, season and competition
Club	Season	League			FA Cup		League Cup		Other^{[A]}		Total	
Club	Season	Division	Apps	Goals	Apps	Goals	Apps	Goals	Apps	Goals	Apps	Goals
Stoke City	1999–2000	Second Division	7	0	1	0	0	0	0	0	8	0
Stoke City	2000–01	Second Division	0	0	0	0	0	0	0	0	0	0
Macclesfield Town (loan)	2001–02	Third Division	3	0	0	0	0	0	0	0	3	0
Career total			10	0	1	0	0	0	0	0	11	0
