= Paul Connor (footballer) =

English footballer

Personal information
- Date of birth: 12 January 1979 (age 47)
- Place of birth: Bishop Auckland, England
- Position: Striker

Team information
- Current team: West Auckland Town

Senior career*
Years	Team	Apps	(Gls)
1996–1999	Middlesbrough	0	(0)
1997	→ Gateshead (loan)	5	(3)
1998	→ Hartlepool United (loan)	6	(0)
1999	→ Stoke City (loan)	3	(2)
1999–2001	Stoke City	33	(5)
2000–2001	→ Cambridge United (loan)	13	(5)
2001–2004	Rochdale	94	(29)
2004–2006	Swansea City	65	(16)
2006–2007	Leyton Orient	34	(7)
2007–2009	Cheltenham Town	79	(7)
2009–2010	Lincoln City	15	(0)
2010–2011	Mansfield Town	52	(15)
2011–2013	Gainsborough Trinity	48	(11)
2013–2017	Shildon		
2017–2022	West Auckland Town		
Total		447	(100)
- * Club domestic league appearances and goals

Paul Connor (born 12 January 1979) is an English former footballer.

Connor began his career with Middlesbrough but did not make an appearance for the club. Connor first played in the English Football League with Hartlepool United who he played for on loan, he also loan spells with Stoke City and non-league side Gateshead while with Middlesbrough. In 1999, Connor signed permanently for Stoke and remained with the club for two years before moving to Rochdale. After a successful spell with Rochdale, Connor was signed by Swansea City for a fee of £35,000. In 2006, he moved to Leyton Orient but spent only season with the club before signing for Cheltenham Town. In 2009, Connor signed for Lincoln City who he made 15 league appearances for. Lincoln would be Connor's final Football League club and he spent the rest of his career playing non-league football for Mansfield Town, Gainsborough Trinity, Shildon and West Auckland Town. He was a player-coach at West Auckland Town before moving into a career in podiatry.

== Career ==
He was signed by Middlesbrough straight after he left school. With his chances of first team football at the Riverside Stadium very scarce, he went on loan to Gateshead, Hartlepool United for a month and then to Stoke where he made 3 appearances. After Middlesbrough released him, Stoke did not hesitate to sign him permanently.

Whilst at Stoke he went on loan to Cambridge United where he scored 5 goals in 14 games. After his time at Stoke he moved to Rochdale, who paid a club record (still standing as of June 2017) fee of £150,000 to bring him to Spotland Stadium. He was an immediate success taking Rochdale to the brink of the play-offs with his goals before an unfortunately-timed injury. This prevented him from playing more than a marginal role the following season when Dale did make the play-offs. He managed to shake off the injury for the 2002–03 season when he played a key role in Dale's run to the Fifth Round of the FA Cup.

With the end of his contract looming Connor was sold just before transfer deadline day in March 2004 for just £35,000 to Swansea City despite Dale's precarious League position. Connor proved to be a hardworking, skilful striker, forging effective partnerships with both Lee Trundle and Kevin Nugent.

Often maligned for basically not being Trundle, Paul scored a number of very important goals with some excellent finishes. The second top goal scorer in the 2004–05 season with 12 finishes in 44 appearances was 3 or 4 better than their top scorers totals for a number of seasons during the 1990s.

In January 2006, he had fallen down the pecking order at the Liberty Stadium, and so the Leyton Orient manager, Martin Ling, signed him for £40,000. He made 34 appearances, scoring 7 goals.

=== Cheltenham Town ===
On 15 January 2007 he signed for Cheltenham Town for an initial fee £20,000 with a further £5,000 payable if the Robins avoided relegation from League One that season. He met up with his new teammates for the first time just two hours before making his debut in the 1–1 home draw with Scunthorpe United on 16 January 2007 before netting his first goal for the club in the 2–1 home victory over his former club Swansea City on 3 February 2007. Having helped the club avoid relegation, Connor was rewarded by being allocated the number 9 shirt for the 2007–2008 season: the first time he had been given a squad number lower than 16. However, his preparations for the season were disrupted as he was forced to miss most of the preparation with an ankle injury suffered during pre-season training in Germany. Despite a number of hard working performances, Connor found the goals hard to come by and went almost eleven months between his first and second league goals for the club; the second coming in the 1–0 home victory over Port Vale on 2 January 2008 and he managed just four league goals from 26 starts and a further 13 substitute appearances that season. He again struggled on the goalscoring front in the 2008–2009 season and in January 2009, Connor was made available for transfer by Town manager Martin Allen saw him miss half of the August fixtures whilst a knee injury sustained in the 3–0 home victory over Darlington on 5 September 2009 kept him on the sidelines for almost five months before returning to the first team squad for the game with Bradford City on 23 January 2010 for which he was an unused substitute. He then struggled to make the starting eleven, starting only five games in the remainder of the season and he departed Sincil Bank on 5 May 2010 with his contract cancelled by mutual consent.

=== Lincoln City ===
Connor commenced the 2009–2010 season by training with Cheltenham Town before joining Lincoln City on trial. He agreed a one-year contract with the Sincil Bank based club on 21 July 2009. He debuted for the club in the 1–0 home victory over Barnet on 8 August 2009 but a thigh strain picked up in training saw him miss half of the August fixtures whilst a knee injury sustained in the 3–0 home victory over Darlington on 5 September 2009 kept him on the sidelines for almost five months before returning to the first team squad for the game with Bradford City on 23 January 2010 for which he was an unused substitute. He then struggled to make the starting eleven, starting only five games in the remainder of the season and he departed Sincil Bank on 5 May 2010 with his contract cancelled by mutual consent.

=== Mansfield Town ===
On 28 July 2010 he joined Mansfield Town on a one-year contract with the club's supporters group The 12th Stag making a contribution to his wages. Connor made an immediate impact scoring two goals on his debut.

=== Gainsborough Trinity ===
On 1 December 2011, Connor joined Gainsborough Trinity on a part-time basis; a move designed to allow him to explore other alternatives after football whilst also spending more time with his young family.

In June 2017 he was appointed player-coach at West Auckland Town after previously being with Shildon.

== Personal life ==
Connor holds a degree in Podiatry which he obtained at New College Durham. He began his career with the NHS working as a podiatrist after retiring from football.

== Career statistics ==
Club	Season	League			FA Cup		League Cup		Other^{[A]}		Total	
Club	Season	Division	Apps	Goals	Apps	Goals	Apps	Goals	Apps	Goals	Apps	Goals
Middlesbrough	1997–98	First Division	0	0	0	0	0	0	0	0	0	0
Gateshead (loan)	1997–98	Conference National	2	3	0	0	0	0	0	0	2	3
Hartlepool United (loan)	1997–98	Third Division	6	0	0	0	0	0	0	0	6	0
Stoke City	1998–99	Second Division	3	2	0	0	0	0	0	0	3	2
Stoke City	1999–2000	Second Division	26	5	1	0	4	1	5	0	36	6
Stoke City	2000–01	Second Division	7	0	0	0	2	2	0	0	9	2
Stoke City	Total		36	7	1	0	6	3	5	0	48	10
Cambridge United (loan)	2000–01	Second Division	13	5	1	0	0	0	0	0	14	5
Rochdale	2000–01	Third Division	14	10	0	0	0	0	0	0	14	10
Rochdale	2001–02	Third Division	19	1	3	0	1	0	0	0	23	1
Rochdale	2002–03	Third Division	39	12	5	3	1	0	1	0	46	15
Rochdale	2003–04	Third Division	22	5	1	0	1	0	0	0	24	5
Rochdale	Total		94	29	8	3	3	0	1	0	107	31
Swansea City	2003–04	Third Division	12	5	0	0	0	0	0	0	12	5
Swansea City	2004–05	League Two	40	10	5	3	0	0	1	0	46	13
Swansea City	2005–06	League One	13	1	1	0	1	0	2	1	17	2
Swansea City	Total		65	16	6	3	1	0	3	1	75	18
Leyton Orient	2005–06	League One	16	5	0	0	0	0	0	0	16	5
Leyton Orient	2007–08	League One	18	2	3	0	1	0	1	0	23	2
Leyton Orient	Total		34	7	3	0	1	0	1	0	39	7
Cheltenham Town	2006–07	League One	15	1	0	0	0	0	0	0	15	1
Cheltenham Town	2007–08	League One	39	4	2	0	1	0	1	1	43	5
Cheltenham Town	2008–09	League One	25	2	4	0	2	0	1	0	32	2
Cheltenham Town	Total		79	7	6	0	3	0	2	1	90	8
Lincoln City	2009–10	League Two	15	0	0	1	0	0	1	0	17	0
Mansfield Town	2010–11	Conference National	40	11	1	0	0	0	0	0	40	11
Career Total			384	85	26	7	14	3	13	2	437	97

A. The "Other" column constitutes appearances and goals in the Football League play-offs, FA Trophy, and Football League Trophy.
