= Chris Iwelumo =

Scottish footballer (born 1978)

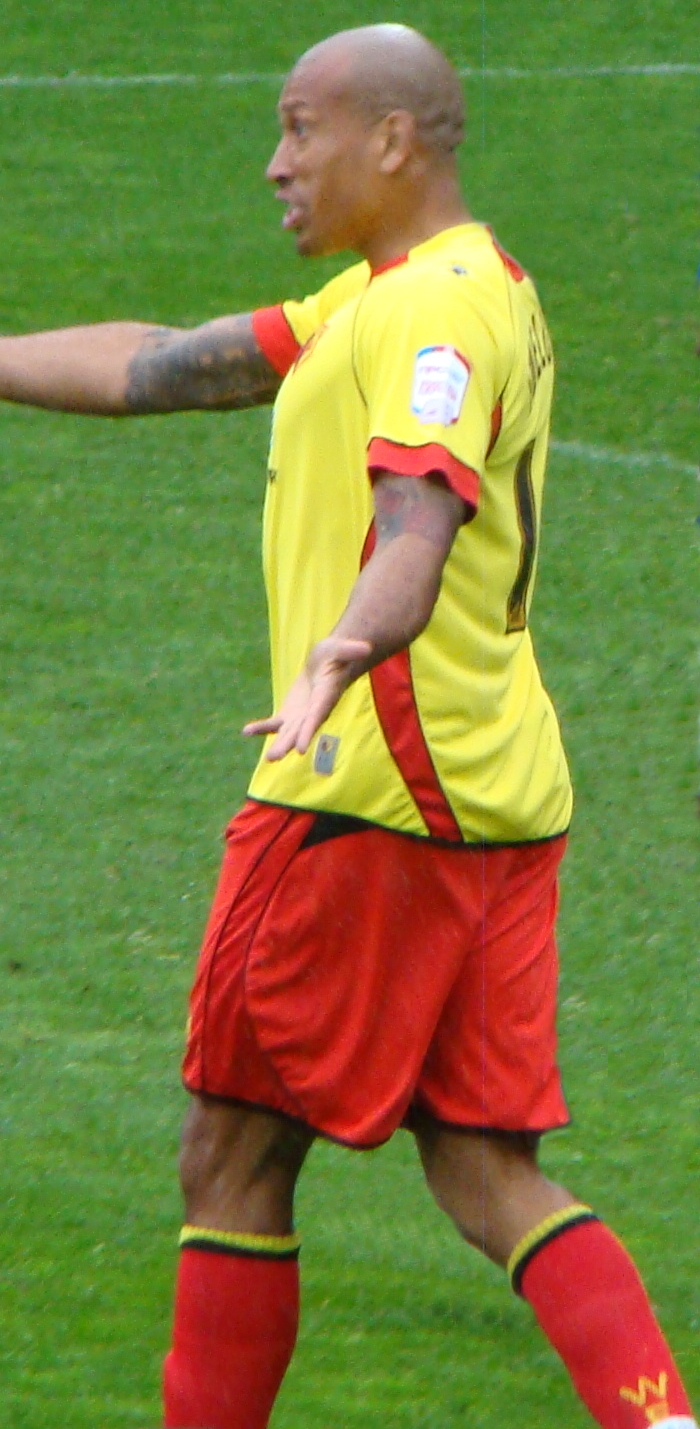
- Iwelumo playing for Watford in 2012

Personal information
- Full name: Christopher Robert Iwelumo
- Date of birth: 1 August 1978 (age 48)
- Place of birth: Coatbridge, Scotland
- Height: 6 ft 4 in (1.93 m)
- Position: Striker

Youth career
- –1995: St Mirren

Senior career*
Years	Team	Apps	(Gls)
1995–1998	St Mirren	31	(1)
1998–2000	Aarhus Fremad	27	(4)
2000–2004	Stoke City	84	(15)
2000	→ York City (loan)	12	(2)
2001	→ Cheltenham Town (loan)	4	(1)
2004	→ Brighton & Hove Albion (loan)	10	(4)
2004–2005	Alemannia Aachen	9	(0)
2005–2007	Colchester United	92	(35)
2007–2008	Charlton Athletic	46	(10)
2008–2010	Wolverhampton Wanderers	46	(14)
2010	→ Bristol City (loan)	7	(2)
2010–2011	Burnley	45	(11)
2011–2013	Watford	45	(4)
2012–2013	→ Notts County (loan)	5	(0)
2013	→ Oldham Athletic (loan)	7	(1)
2013–2014	Scunthorpe United	12	(2)
2014	St Johnstone	6	(0)
2014	Chester	10	(1)
Total		498	(107)

International career
2007	Scotland B	1	(0)
2008–2010	Scotland	4	(0)

Managerial career
- 2016–2017: Chester (assistant)
- * Club domestic league appearances and goals

Christopher Robert Iwelumo (/ɪˈwɛləmoʊ/; born 1 August 1978) is a Scottish professional football coach and former player who played as a striker.

Iwelumo started his career with St Mirren before moving to Danish club Aarhus Fremad for two years. A move to Stoke City in 2000 saw him sent out on loan to several teams before a short-lived spell with German side Alemannia Aachen. After moving to the Football League Championship with Colchester United and then Charlton Athletic, he signed for Wolverhampton Wanderers in 2008 as they won promotion to the Premier League.

He won his first cap as a Scottish international coming on as a substitute against Norway in a 2010 FIFA World Cup qualifier in 2008. He had his first international start in a friendly against Argentina in November the same year.

== Club career ==
=== Early career ===
Born in Coatbridge, North Lanarkshire to a Nigerian father and a Scottish mother, Iwelumo started his career with Scottish Football League club St Mirren as a junior in their youth system before signing a professional contract on 5 August 1996.

Iwelumo had only made nineteen appearances for St Mirren, scoring twice against Berwick in the Scottish League Cup and Dundee in the Scottish Cup, before his performances were being noticed and in early 1998, Aarhus Fremad of Denmark signed him up. Aarhus released him two years later in February 2000 and he had trials at Preston North End and Celtic – the team he supports – before signing a four-year deal with Stoke City.

=== Stoke City ===
After two years in Denmark, Iwelumo returned to the UK to join third tier Stoke City. He played as a substitute as Stoke won the 2000 Football League Trophy Final. Later that year he was sent out on loan to York City where he made eleven appearances before returning to Stoke. He remained there before being loaned out again to Cheltenham Town in February 2001. He played four times for Cheltenham Town, scoring once against Mansfield before being recalled from his loan by Stoke City where he managed to build on his appearances without actually gaining a regular place in the first team, his most notable contribution possibly being the equaliser in the Potteries derby on 21 October 2001. He signed a two-year contract extension with Stoke in March 2002.

Barnsley revealed an interest in signing Iwelumo in January 2004. He was subject of a loan move once more when he moved to Brighton & Hove Albion in March 2004. He helped the "Seagulls" to the 2004 Second Division play-off final in Cardiff, winning the penalty that gave Albion promotion. When he returned to Stoke at the end of the season he was released, after four years at the club.

=== Alemannia Aachen ===
2. Bundesliga side Alemannia Aachen signed Iwelumo on a free transfer in July 2004, after rejecting the offer of a two-year contract from Brighton. However his stay at Aachen was short-lived, and he was released after just six months and nine substitute appearances.

=== Colchester United ===
Iwelumo had his most successful period of his career at Colchester United, he signed for Colchester United in July 2005. On 28 November 2006, the many highlights included, the four goals he scored as Colchester beat Hull City 5–1 in a Championship league match. Iwelumo formed a formidable partnership with Jamie Cureton that season, with the U's eventually finishing 10th in The Championship. Whilst at Colchester, he helped them achieve promotion to the Championship in 2006 and finish in a club record 10th position the following season. Iwelumo rejected a new contract offer from Colchester on 21 May 2007.

=== Charlton Athletic ===
On the same day signed for Charlton Athletic on a free transfer. In the 2007–08 season he featured in every league game and was the Addicks' top goalscorer; he was also named the Championship's player of the month for November 2007 after scoring last minute winning goals in two consecutive games.

=== Wolverhampton Wanderers ===
It was confirmed that Iwelumo could leave Charlton as part of cost-cutting measures and he eventually signed for fellow Championship side Wolverhampton Wanderers in July 2008 on a two-year deal. Iwelumo scored a hat-trick for Wolves against Preston North End in a 3–1 win, taking his goal tally to eight for the season, where he was also sent off for an apparent head-butt on defender Sean St Ledger. Wolves made an appeal against this, which was turned down, despite St Ledger stating that the clash of heads was accidental and Iwelumo served a three-match ban.

His early season form in front of goal earned him November's Championship Player of the Month Award. However, after this run of form he entered a goalless drought of 16 games before netting against his former club Charlton.

His season was ended prematurely after a high tackle from Lee Carsley in the game against promotion rivals Birmingham City left him with medial ligament damage. In his absence the team secured promotion to the Premier League as champions.

He regained fitness over the summer break but suffered more injury woe as he broke his metatarsal in Wolves' opening pre-season game against Australian club Perth Glory. He eventually returned to first team contention and made his Premier League debut in a 1–1 draw against Aston Villa in October 2009, though again suffered an injury setback which put him on the sidelines for a further month.

When fit, his Premier League appearance were limited to fleeting substitute roles and he instead moved on a month's loan to Championship side Bristol City in February 2010 to gain more playing time. He scored the first of two goals for Bristol City in a 2–1 win over West Bromwich Albion on 21 February 2010. He returned to Wolves to battle for his place, making a handful of further substitute appearances as the club confirmed their Premier League survival, but failing to score, meaning he had scored just once for Wolves in 18 months.

=== Burnley ===
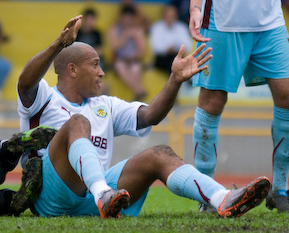
Iwelumo playing for Burnley in 2010

He signed for Championship side Burnley on 1 June 2010 on a two-year deal for an undisclosed fee. Iwelumo scored his first goal for Burnley on his debut on 7 August 2010, scoring the winner against Nottingham Forest in a 1–0 victory for Burnley. On 11 September 2010 Iwelumo scored a stunning hattrick against Preston North End in a 4–3 win for Burnley at home, with two fine headers and a volley. After a disappointing second half to the season, Iwelumo was subject to transfer speculation, with a failed move to Preston North End.

=== Watford ===
Iwelumo signed for Championship rivals Watford on a two-year contract for an undisclosed fee on 19 July 2011. Iwelumo made his debut for Watford against former club Burnley on the opening day of the season. The game finished 2–2. Iwelumo scored his first goal for Watford against Hull City in October and had to wait another five months before scoring again in which he bagged a brace against Leeds United on 31 March 2012.

Following an injury to John Eustace at the start of the 2012–13 season and the departure of Martin Taylor, Iwelumo captained Watford for the first time against Derby County on 1 September 2012.

Iwelumo joined Notts County on loan on 23 November. He returned to Watford after failing to score for the "Magpies" in five matches. On 31 January 2013, Iwelumo joined Oldham Athletic on loan until the end of the 2012–13 season.

=== Later career ===
On 3 June 2013, Iwelumo joined League Two side Scunthorpe United on a one-year deal. He spent six months at Scunthorpe before joining St Johnstone on 23 January 2014. Iwelumo was an unused substitute as St Johnstone won the 2014 Scottish Cup Final. He joined Conference Premier side Chester on 30 June 2014, but announced his retirement from football on 28 October 2014.

== International career ==
Iwelumo was called up for the Scotland squad to tour South Korea in 2002 but had to withdraw as his club Stoke City were involved in the Football League Championship play-offs. In November 2007, he was named in the Scotland B team for a friendly against Republic of Ireland B, which he featured in as Scotland drew 1–1.

He was called up to the full Scotland squad for a 2010 FIFA World Cup qualification match against Norway at Hampden Park on 11 October 2008. He came on as a 57th-minute substitute in that game to make his debut, but his performance was overshadowed by an open goal miss from three yards, in a match that finished 0–0. For days after, Iwelumo constantly watched video replays of the incident but was determined not to be remembered for the miss, stated "I'm a proud Scot, I love my country and it's my dream to do well for them." He was recalled for his first international start in a friendly against Argentina on 19 November 2008.

== Coaching career ==
=== Wolverhampton Wanderers ===
In July 2015, Iwelumo was appointed head coach of the under-18 team at former club Wolverhampton Wanderers. However, he quit the position less than a week later.

=== Chester ===
In November 2016 Iwelumo re-joined former club Chester as assistant manager to Jon McCarthy but continued to work as a pundit for Channel 5's Football League Show. In June 2017, citing concerns from fans about his absence on matchdays, he moved into the role of first-team striker coach.

== Media career ==
In October 2014, one day after he announced his retirement from playing, Iwelumo began working in the media department at his former club Stoke City.

Iwelumo graduated from Staffordshire University in 2016 with a first-class bachelor's degree in Professional Sports Writing and Broadcasting.

Iwelumo can often be heard as a co-commentator on Talksport.

== Career statistics ==
=== Club ===
Appearances and goals by club, season and competition
Club	Season	League			National cup (Note: Includes Scottish FA Cup, FA Cup, DFB-Pokal)		League cup (Note: Includes Scottish League Cup, Football League Cup)		Other		Total	
Club	Season	Division	Apps	Goals	Apps	Goals	Apps	Goals	Apps	Goals	Apps	Goals
St Mirren	1995–96	Scottish First Division	5	1	1	0	0	0	0	0	6	1
St Mirren	1996–97	Scottish First Division	14	0	1	0	2	1	0	0	17	1
St Mirren	1997–98	Scottish First Division	12	0	2	1	1	0	1 (Note: Appearance in Scottish Challenge Cup)	0	16	1
St Mirren	Total		31	1	4	1	3	1	1	0	39	3
Aarhus Fremad	1998–99	Danish Superliga	27	4	—		—		—		27	4
Stoke City	1999–2000	Second Division	3	0	0	0	0	0	1 (Note: Appearance(s) in Football League Trophy)	0	4	0
Stoke City	2000–01	Second Division	2	1	0	0	2	1	0	0	4	2
Stoke City	2001–02	Second Division	38	10	4	1	1	0	4 (Note: One appearance and one goal in Football League Trophy, three appearances in Football League Second Division play-offs)	1	47	12
Stoke City	2002–03	First Division	32	4	3	3	1	0	—		36	7
Stoke City	2003–04	First Division	9	0	1	0	2	1	—		12	1
Stoke City	Total		84	15	8	4	6	2	5	1	103	22
York City (loan)	2000–01	Third Division	12	2	4	1	0	0	0	0	16	3
Cheltenham Town (loan)	2000–01	Third Division	4	1	0	0	0	0	0	0	4	1
Brighton & Hove Albion (loan)	2003–04	Second Division	10	4	0	0	0	0	3 (Note: Appearances in Football League Second Division play-offs)	0	13	4
Alemannia Aachen	2004–05	2. Bundesliga	9	0	1	0	—		4 (Note: Appearances in UEFA Cup)	0	14	0
Colchester United	2005–06	League One	46	17	5	2	1	0	3	0	55	19
Colchester United	2006–07	Championship	46	18	1	0	1	0	—		48	18
Colchester United	Total		92	35	6	2	2	0	3	0	103	37
Charlton Athletic	2007–08	Championship	46	10	2	0	2	0	—		50	10
Wolverhampton Wanderers	2008–09	Championship	31	14	2	0	2	2	—		35	16
Wolverhampton Wanderers	2009–10	Premier League	15	0	2	0	0	0	—		17	0
Wolverhampton Wanderers	Total		46	14	4	0	2	2	—		52	16
Bristol City (loan)	2009–10	Championship	7	2	0	0	0	0	—		7	2
Burnley	2010–11	Championship	45	11	3	0	2	0	—		50	11
Watford	2011–12	Championship	38	4	1	0	0	0	—		39	4
Watford	2012–13	Championship	7	0	0	0	1	1	—		8	1
Watford	Total		45	4	1	0	1	1	—		47	5
Notts County (loan)	2012–13	League One	5	0	0	0	0	0	0	0	5	0
Oldham Athletic (loan)	2012–13	League One	7	1	2	0	0	0	0	0	9	1
Scunthorpe United	2013–14	League Two	12	2	1	0	1	0	0	0	14	2
St Johnstone	2013–14	Scottish Premiership	6	0	1	0	1	0	—		8	0
Chester	2014–15	Conference Premier	10	1	0	0	—		—		10	1
Career total			498	107	37	8	20	6	16	1	571	122

=== International ===
Appearances and goals by national team and year
National team	Year	Apps	Goals
Scotland	2008	2	0
Scotland	2009	0	0
Scotland	2010	2	0
Total		4	0

== Honours ==
Stoke City

- Football League Second Division play-offs: 2002
- Football League Trophy: 1999–2000

Brighton & Hove Albion

- Football League Second Division play-offs: 2004

Wolverhampton Wanderers

- Football League Championship: 2008–09

St Johnstone

- Scottish Cup: 2013–14

Individual

- Football League Championship Player of the Month: November 2007, November 2008
