= Billy Mercer (footballer, born 1969) =

English footballer and coach (born 1969)

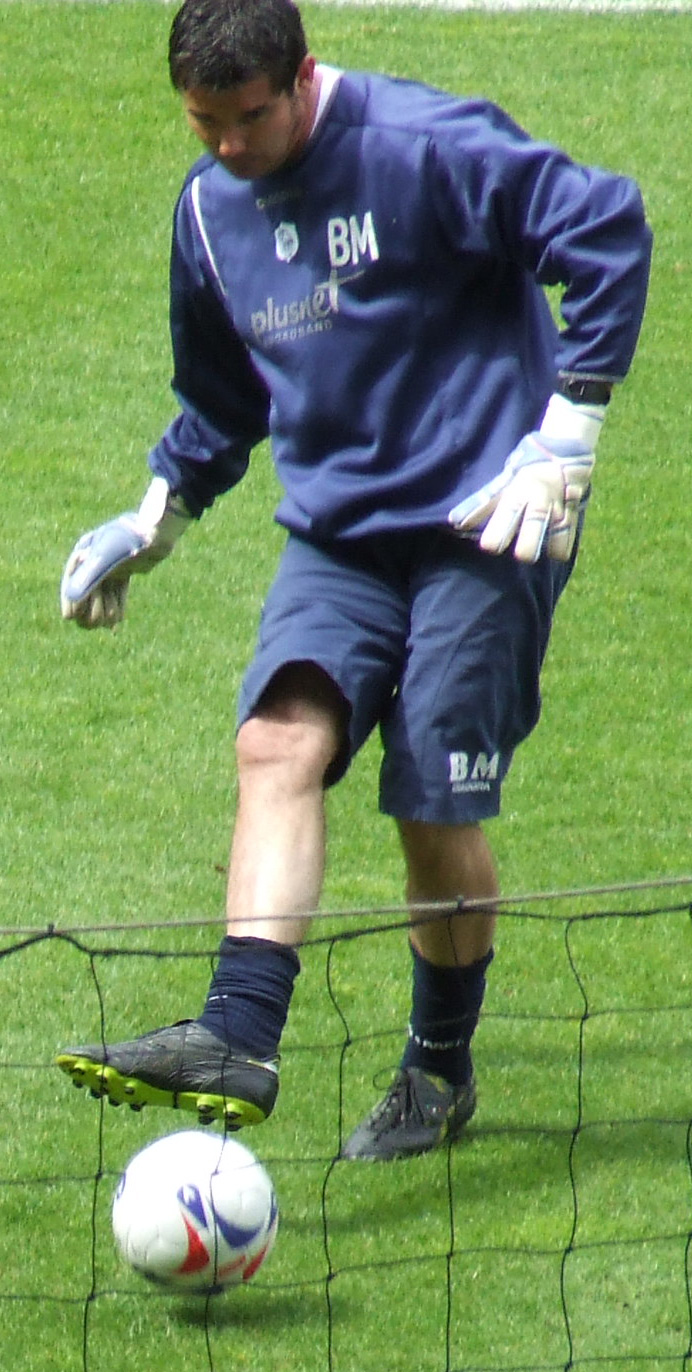

Personal information
- Full name: William Mercer
- Date of birth: 22 May 1969 (age 57)
- Place of birth: Liverpool, England
- Position: Goalkeeper

Team information
- Current team: Nottingham Forest (Goalkeeper Coach)

Youth career
- Liverpool

Senior career*
| Years | Team | Apps | (Gls) |
| 1987–1989 | Liverpool | 0 | (0) |
| 1989–1994 | Rotherham United | 104 | (0) |
| 1994–1995 | Sheffield United | 4 | (0) |
| 1995 | → Nottingham Forest (loan) | 0 | (0) |
| 1995 | → Chesterfield (loan) | 7 | (0) |
| 1995–1999 | Chesterfield | 142 | (0) |
| 1999–2003 | Bristol City | 25 | (0) |
| Total | | 282 | (0) |
- * Club domestic league appearances and goals

William Mercer (born 22 May 1969) is an English former footballer who played as a goalkeeper. He is current goalkeeping coach at Nottingham Forest.

== Playing career ==
Mercer was born at Cantril Farm in 1969 and joined local club Liverpool as a trainee and turned professional at the age of 18. He stayed at Liverpool for another 18 months before being released and signing for Rotherham United on 16 February 1989. On 15 April 1989, Mercer was in attendance at Hillsborough for the FA Cup semi-final between Liverpool and Nottingham Forest, where 97 Liverpool fans died in what became known as the Hillsborough disaster. Mercer was in the upper tier of the Leppings Lane end, above where the fatal crush occurred.

Mercer was able to break through in to the first team at Millmoor and over the next five and a half years he made 138 appearances for the Millers in all competitions. On 12 October 1994 Mercer was signed by local rivals Sheffield United; he went on to spend just over a year at Bramall Lane. However, he found playing time limited for the Blades, and loan spells at Nottingham Forest and Chesterfield followed.

Mercer made such an impression during his loan spell at Chesterfield that the club immediately placed a £100,000 bid for the player following the expiration of his loan. Mercer made the switch to Saltergate permanent on 12 December 1995. Over the next four seasons he established himself as first choice between the posts at Chesterfield and went on to make 164 appearances for the club in all competitions. This included a run to the 1997 FA Cup semi-final, with Mercer earning a Man of the Match award for his performance in the sixth round match against Wrexham and then playing in their thrilling 3–3 draw with Middlesbrough in the semi-final at Old Trafford. The replay took place at Hillsborough, which was the first time he had returned to the stadium since being present at the Hillsborough disaster eight years earlier. Chesterfield lost this game and their dreams of becoming the first team to reach an FA Cup final from the third tier of the English league were over.

By the 1999–2000 season Mercer had found himself down the pecking order at Saltergate, and on 26 October 1999 Second Division rivals Bristol City signed Mercer for £300,000. In his first season there, Mercer made 32 appearances in all competitions, but again found himself as backup, this time to Steve Phillips. Mercer would not play another game for the Robins, but remained on their books until he retired from professional football on 15 January 2003.

== Coaching career ==
Following his retirement, Mercer remained at Bristol City as a goalkeeping coach. He impressed during his time coaching at Ashton Gate and was subsequently brought to Hillsborough in the summer of 2004 by Chris Turner shortly before his sacking as Sheffield Wednesday manager.

Following the sacking of Paul Sturrock on 19 October 2006 Mercer acted as caretaker assistant manager to Sean McAuley before the arrival of Brian Laws and Russ Wilcox on 6 November 2006.

Following Brian Laws' appointment as manager of Premier League side Burnley in January 2010, Mercer joined the club as goalkeeping coach. He remained at the club until 15 April 2022, when he was sacked along with manager Sean Dyche, assistant manager Ian Woan and first-team coach Steve Stone.

On 30 September 2022, Billy was appointed temporary goalkeeper coach of Rotherham United, after the departure of Andy Warrington. He has openly admitted that the role is purely to help the club out and stated "I am going to be here for as long as I'm wanted. Obviously, I have to be respectful to my old manager Sean Dyche, who I've worked under for many years, but for the time being I'm happy to be involved".

On 10 July 2023, Billy was signed to a short term deal with Everton to fill-in for goalkeeping coach Alan Kelly who was sidelined due to knee surgery.

On 21 October 2025, he returned to Nottingham Forest as their goalkeeping coach, linking up once again with Sean Dyche who he had worked alongside at Burnley and Everton.

== Honours ==
Bristol City

- Football League Trophy runner-up: 1999–2000
