= Robert Speakman =

Welsh footballer (born 1980)

Personal information
- Date of birth: 5 December 1980 (age 45)
- Place of birth: Swansea, Wales
- Position: Forward

Senior career*
| Years | Team | Apps | (Gls) |
| 1998–2001 | Exeter City | 19 | (3) |
- * Club domestic league appearances and goals

Robert Speakman (born 5 December 1980) is an English former footballer who played in the Football League for Exeter City.
