= Graham Kavanagh =

Irish footballer and manager (born 1973)

Personal information
- Full name: Graham Anthony Kavanagh
- Date of birth: 2 December 1973 (age 52)
- Place of birth: Dublin, Ireland
- Height: 5 ft 10 in (1.78 m)
- Position: Midfielder

Senior career*
Years	Team	Apps	(Gls)
1990–1991	Home Farm		
1991–1996	Middlesbrough	35	(3)
1994	→ Darlington (loan)	5	(0)
1996	→ Stoke City (loan)	3	(1)
1996–2001	Stoke City	203	(33)
2001–2005	Cardiff City	142	(28)
2005–2006	Wigan Athletic	48	(0)
2006–2009	Sunderland	14	(1)
2007	→ Sheffield Wednesday (loan)	7	(1)
2008	→ Sheffield Wednesday (loan)	16	(1)
2008–2009	→ Carlisle United (loan)	10	(3)
2009–2011	Carlisle United	54	(4)
Total		537	(75)

International career
1992–1993	Republic of Ireland U21	5	(0)
1998–2006	Republic of Ireland	16	(1)

Managerial career
- 2013–2014: Carlisle United
- * Club domestic league appearances and goals

Graham Anthony Kavanagh (born 2 December 1973) is an Irish football manager and former professional players.

Kavanagh had a 19-year-long career and played for Middlesbrough, Stoke City, Cardiff City, Wigan Athletic, Sunderland, Sheffield Wednesday and Carlisle United. He also played 16 games for the Republic of Ireland national team, scoring once.

== Club career ==
Kavanagh began his career at Home Farm, before joining Middlesbrough in 1991 but struggled to ever hold down a first team place and was sold to Stoke City in 1996, after a short loan spell at the club, for £250,000. In 1996–97 he made 41 appearances scoring four goals including the final goal at the Victoria Ground against West Bromwich Albion. Kavanagh also had the honour of scoring Stoke's first goal at the Britannia Stadium in a League Cup match against Rochdale. He scored 10 goals in 1997–98 as Stoke suffered relegation to the third tier. In 1998–99 he top-scored with 13 goals as failed mount a sustained promotion challenge under Brian Little in 1998–99. In 1999–2000 Kavanagh scored 10 goals as Stoke reached the play-offs where they lost to Gillingham. He also played and scored in the 2000 Football League Trophy final as Stoke beat Bristol City 2–1. He was again a regular in 2000–01 as Stoke again failed in the play-offs this time losing to Walsall. He left Stoke in the summer of 2001 after making 244 appearances scoring 45 goals.

He joined Cardiff City in July 2001 for £1 million, and went on to score fifteen times in his first season at the club and help them to promotion the following year when they beat Queens Park Rangers in the Second Division play-off final. He scored one of Cardiff's goals as they memorably knocked out then Premiership Leeds United in the FA Cup third round in 2002. He also scored the winning goal in the FAW Premier Cup final against rivals Swansea

During the 2004–05 season Cardiff chairman Sam Hammam revealed that the club was in serious financial trouble and as such a number of players left the club to attempt to regain losses, including Kavanagh who signed for Wigan Athletic for a fee close to £400,000. Whilst at Wigan he started in the 2006 Football League Cup Final. On 31 August 2006, he signed a three-year deal with Roy Keane's Sunderland for £500,000. During that season he played 14 games, scoring one goal against Leeds, before he was ruled out for the majority of games due to lingering injury problems.

He joined Sheffield Wednesday on 21 September 2007 on a loan deal to regain his fitness where he played seven games, scoring one goal against Watford on 2 October. On 29 December, Leicester City made a bid for Kavanagh, together with Márton Fülöp. However, on 31 January 2008 Kavanagh again joined Wednesday on a loan deal until the end of the season.

Kavanagh joined League One side Carlisle United on a month's loan on 10 October 2008. This loan was extended for a further month on 7 November. It was again extended on 18 December and would expire on 3 January 2009.

== Managerial career ==
On 9 January 2009, Kavanagh was released by Sunderland and returned to Carlisle on a permanent basis as a player-coach. In April 2013, Kavanagh continued his post as Assistant Manager at the end of the 2012–13 season, after signing a new one-year deal. In September 2013 manager Greg Abbott was sacked and Kavanagh was installed as caretaker manager. Kavanagh was then appointed manager on a permanent basis on 30 September 2013 signing a two-year contract. Carlisle were 22nd on the ladder at the time of Kavanagh's caretaker appointment, and finished the 2013–14 season in the same position, to be relegated to League Two. After a poor start to the 2014–15 season Kavanagh left Carlisle on 1 September 2014.

== International career ==
Kavanagh earned 16 international caps for the Republic of Ireland, the last of which was on 16 August 2006 against the Netherlands.

== Personal life ==
His son Calum is a professional footballer for Oldham Athletic, having started his career at Middlesbrough.

== Career statistics ==
=== Club ===
Appearances and goals by club, season and competition
Club	Season	League			FA Cup		League Cup		Other		Total	
Club	Season	Division	Apps	Goals	Apps	Goals	Apps	Goals	Apps	Goals	Apps	Goals
Middlesbrough	1992–93	Premier League	10	0	2	0	0	0	—		12	0
Middlesbrough	1993–94	First Division	11	2	1	1	1	0	4 (Note: Appearances in Anglo-Italian Cup)	0	17	3
Middlesbrough	1994–95	First Division	7	0	1	0	0	0	2	0	10	0
Middlesbrough	1995–96	Premier League	7	1	0	0	0	0	—		7	1
Middlesbrough	Total		35	3	4	1	1	0	6	0	46	4
Darlington (loan)	1993–94	Third Division	5	0	0	0	0	0	0	0	5	0
Stoke City	1996–97	First Division	38	4	1	0	2	0	—		41	4
Stoke City	1997–98	First Division	44	5	0	0	5	5	—		49	10
Stoke City	1998–99	Second Division	36	11	2	0	2	1	2 (Note: Appearances in Football League Trophy)	1	42	13
Stoke City	1999–2000	Second Division	45	7	1	0	4	1	9 (Note: Seven appearances and two goals in Football League Trophy and two appearances in Second Division play-offs)	2	59	10
Stoke City	2000–01	Second Division	43	7	2	0	5	0	4 (Note: Two appearances in Football League Trophy and two appearances and one goal in Second Division play-offs)	1	54	8
Stoke City	Total		206	34	6	0	18	7	15	4	245	45
Cardiff City	2001–02	Second Division	43	13	4	2	1	0	2 (Note: Appearances in Second Division play-offs)	0	50	15
Cardiff City	2002–03	Second Division	44	5	4	1	2	0	3	0	53	6
Cardiff City	2003–04	First Division	27	7	1	0	1	0	—		29	7
Cardiff City	2004–05	Championship	28	3	2	0	3	0	—		33	3
Cardiff City	Total		142	28	11	3	7	0	5	0	165	31
Wigan Athletic	2004–05	Championship	11	0	0	0	0	0	—		11	0
Wigan Athletic	2005–06	Premier League	35	0	2	0	5	0	—		42	0
Wigan Athletic	2006–07	Premier League	2	0	0	0	0	0	—		2	0
Wigan Athletic	Total		48	0	2	0	5	0	—		55	0
Sunderland	2006–07	Championship	14	1	0	0	0	0	—		14	1
Sheffield Wednesday (loan)	2007–08	Championship	23	2	1	0	1	0	—		25	2
Carlisle United	2008–09	League One	34	5	3	1	0	0	0	0	36	6
Carlisle United	2009–10	League One	29	2	4	0	1	0	5	3	39	5
Carlisle United	2010–11	League One	1	0	0	0	0	0	0	0	1	0
Carlisle United	Total		64	7	7	1	1	0	5	3	77	11
Career total			537	75	31	5	33	7	31	7	632	94

=== International ===
Appearances and goals by national team and year
National team	Year	Apps	Goals
Republic of Ireland	1998	1	0
Republic of Ireland	1999	2	1
Republic of Ireland	2003	1	0
Republic of Ireland	2004	5	0
Republic of Ireland	2005	4	0
Republic of Ireland	2006	3	0
Total		16	1

== Managerial statistics ==
As of 1 September 2014

Managerial record by team and tenure
Team	From	To	Record				
Team	From	To	P	W	D	L	Win %
Carlisle United	9 September 2013	1 September 2014	52	13	14	25	25.0
Total			52	13	14	25	25.0

== Honours ==
Stoke City

- Football League Trophy: 1999–2000

Cardiff City

- Football League Second Division play-offs: 2003

Wigan Athletic

- Football League Cup runner-up: 2005–06

Sunderland

- Football League Championship: 2006–07

Carlisle United

- Football League Trophy runner-up: 2009–10

Individual

- PFA Team of the Year: 1998–99 Second Division, 1999–2000 Second Division, 2000–01 Second Division, 2001–02 Second Division, 2002–03 Second Division
