= 1999–2000 Football League Trophy =

Auto Windscreens Shield

Tournament details
- Country: England; Wales
- Teams: 48

Final positions
- Champions: Stoke City
- Runners-up: Bristol City

Tournament statistics
- Matches played: 49

The 1999–2000 Football League Trophy, known as the Auto Windscreens Shield for sponsorship reasons, was the 19th staging of the Football League Trophy, a knock-out competition for English football clubs in Second and Third Division. The winners were Stoke City who beat Bristol City 2–1 in the final.

The competition began on 7 December 1999 and ended with the final on 16 April 2000 at the Wembley Stadium.

In the first round, there were two sections: North and South. In the following rounds each section gradually eliminates teams in knock-out fashion until each has a winning finalist. At this point, the two winning finalists face each other in the combined final to determine the winners of the Football League Trophy.

== First round ==
=== Northern Section ===
The teams that given byes to the second round are Carlisle United, Chester City, Chesterfield, Lincoln City, Macclesfield Town, Oldham Athletic, Rochdale and Scunthorpe United.

Date	Home team	Score	Away team	Attendance
7 December	Hartlepool United	1 – 0	Halifax Town	1,482
7 December	Mansfield Town	2 – 1	Bury	1,205
7 December	Notts County	0 – 1	Blackpool	1,167
7 December	Preston North End	4 – 1	Wrexham	3,306
7 December	Rotherham United	2 – 1	Shrewsbury Town	1,166
7 December	Stoke City	3 – 2	Darlington	3,341
7 December	Wigan Athletic	2 – 1	Burnley	2,085
7 December	York City	0 – 1	Hull City	1,005

=== Southern Section ===
The teams that given byes to the second round are Bristol City, Bournemouth, Bristol Rovers, Wycombe Wanderers, Brentford, Peterborough United, Exeter City and Plymouth Argyle.

Date	Home team	Score	Away team	Attendance
7 December	Brighton & Hove Albion	1 – 0	Millwall	2,407
7 December	Gillingham	0 – 3	Torquay United	2,718
7 December	Northampton Town	1 – 0	Cardiff City	2,431
7 December	Oxford United	2 – 0	Luton Town	1,220
7 December	Southend United	0 – 1	Cheltenham Town	1,227
7 December	Swansea City	3 – 1	Colchester United	1,222
8 December	Reading	1 – 0	Leyton Orient	1,561
11 January	Cambridge United	1 – 2	Barnet	1,556

== Second round ==
=== Northern Section ===
Date	Home team	Score	Away team	Attendance
8 January	Lincoln City	1 – 2	Scunthorpe United	3,617
10 January	Preston North End	1 – 2	Hartlepool United	3,635
11 January	Hull City	2 – 0	Chester City	1,680
11 January	Mansfield Town	0 – 1	Blackpool	1,884
11 January	Rochdale	3 – 2	Macclesfield Town	1,123
11 January	Rotherham United	1 – 4	Chesterfield	1,997
18 January	Oldham Athletic	0 – 1	Stoke City	4,682
25 January	Carlisle United	2 – 1	Wigan Athletic	1,321

=== Southern Section ===
Date	Home team	Score	Away team	Attendance
11 January	Bournemouth	1 – 0	Brighton & Hove Albion	4,325
11 January	Exeter City	2 – 0	Swansea City	964
11 January	Northampton Town	0 – 0	Bristol Rovers	2,443
Bristol Rovers won 5 – 3 on penalties
11 January	Oxford United	1 – 1	Wycombe Wanderers	1,798
Oxford United won 5 – 3 on penalties
11 January	Peterborough United	0 – 1	Brentford	2,430
11 January	Plymouth Argyle	0 – 1	Torquay United	3,124
12 January	Bristol City	3 – 1	Cheltenham Town	4,123
18 January	Barnet	0 – 1	Reading	1,109

== Quarter-final ==
=== Northern Section ===
Date	Home team	Score	Away team	Attendance
22 February	Hartlepool United	1 – 2	Carlisle United	2,399
25 January	Blackpool	1 – 2	Stoke City	4,943
25 January	Rochdale	0 – 0	Hull City	1,745
Rochdale won 5 – 4 on penalties
25 January	Scunthorpe United	1 – 2	Chesterfield	2,583

=== Southern Section ===
Date	Home team	Score	Away team	Attendance
24 January	Bristol Rovers	1 – 2	Reading	4,948
25 January	Brentford	2 – 0	Oxford United	2,942
25 January	Bristol City	1 – 1	Bournemouth	4,291
Bristol City won 4 – 1 on penalties
25 January	Exeter City	1 – 0	Torquay United	2,599

== Semi-final ==
=== Northern Section ===
Date	Home team	Score	Away team	Attendance
15 February	Chesterfield	0 – 1	Stoke City	3,825
7 March	Carlisle United	0 – 1	Rochdale	1,792

=== Southern Section ===
Date	Home team	Score	Away team	Attendance
15 February	Bristol City	4 – 0	Reading	8,733
15 February	Exeter City	3 – 2	Brentford	2,392

== Area finals ==
=== Northern Area final ===
2000-03-14
19:45

Rochdale	1 – 3	Stoke City
Holt 86'		Hansson 4'; Thorne 21', 27'

Spotland Stadium, Rochdale
Attendance: 4,241
2000-03-22
19:45

Stoke City	1 – 0	Rochdale
Thorne 86'

Britannia Stadium, Stoke-on-Trent
Attendance: 16,876

Stoke City beat Rochdale 4–1 on aggregate.

=== Southern Area final ===
2000-02-29
19:45

Bristol City	4 – 0	Exeter City
Thorpe 4'; Beadle 63'; Murray 68'; Burnell 75'

Ashton Gate, Bristol
Attendance: 12,742
2000-03-14
19:45

Exeter City	1 – 1	Bristol City
Speakman 30'		Beadle 65'

St James Park, Exeter
Attendance: 2,929

Bristol City beat Exeter City 5–1 on aggregate.

== Final ==
2000-04-16
15:00 BST

Bristol City	1 – 2	Stoke City
Holland 74'	Match Report	Kavanagh 32'; Thorne 82'

Wembley Stadium
Attendance: 75,057
Referee: K.M.Lynch

Bristol City	Stoke City

BRISTOL CITY:
GK	2	(England) Billy Mercer
DF	6	(England) Louis Carey	(substituted off) 87'
DF	27	(England) Andy Jordan
DF	46	(England) Keith Millen
DF	3	(England) Michael Bell
MF	17	(England) Aaron Brown	(substituted off) 68'
MF	26	(Scotland) Scott Murray	Booked
MF	10	(England) Paul Holland
MF	11	(England) Brian Tinnion
FW	20	(England) Peter Beadle
FW	21	(England) Tony Thorpe
Substitutes:
GK	15	(England) Steve Phillips
DF	43	(England) Kevin Amankwaah	(substituted on) 87'
DF	32	(England) Matt Hill
MF	33	(England) Joe Burnell
FW	34	(England) Damian Spencer	(substituted on) 68'
Manager:
(England) David Burnside

STOKE CITY:
GK	1	(England) Gavin Ward
DF	5	(England) Nicky Mohan
DF	15	(Sweden) Mikael Hansson
DF	22	(Republic of Ireland) Clive Clarke
MF	2	(Iceland) Brynjar Gunnarsson
MF	8	(Republic of Ireland) Graham Kavanagh
MF	17	(Republic of Ireland) James O'Connor	Booked
MF	25	(Iceland) Bjarni Guðjónsson
MF	36	(Iceland) Arnar Gunnlaugsson	(yellow card) (substituted off) 62'
FW	9	(England) Peter Thorne
FW	12	(Bermuda) Kyle Lightbourne	(substituted off) 89'
Substitute:
GK	14	(England) Carl Muggleton
DF	32	(Norway) Anders Jacobsen
DF	34	(England) Richard Dryden	(substituted on) 62'
MF	35	(England) Steve Melton
FW	31	(Scotland) Chris Iwelumo	(substituted on) 89'
Manager:
(Iceland) Guðjón Þórðarson

MATCH RULES

- 90 minutes.
- 30 minutes of extra-time if necessary.
- Golden goal in extra time
- Penalty shoot-out if scores still level.
- Maximum of 3 substitutions.
