= Anders Jacobsen (footballer) =

Norwegian footballer and manager (born 1968)

Personal information
- Full name: Anders Jacobsen
- Date of birth: 18 April 1968 (age 58)
- Place of birth: Oslo, Norway
- Height: 6 ft 2 in (1.88 m)
- Position: Defender

Senior career*
Years	Team	Apps	(Gls)
1985–1988	Asker		
1989–1990	Vålerenga	33	(3)
1990–1994	Lillestrøm	17	(2)
1995–1996	Skeid	18	(0)
1997–1998	Start	55	(0)
1998–1999	Sheffield United	12	(0)
1999–2000	Stoke City	33	(2)
2000–2001	Notts County	29	(2)
2001	Asker	1	(0)
2001–2003	Skeid	56	(2)
Total		254	(11)

Managerial career
- 2005: Strømsgodset IF
- * Club domestic league appearances and goals

Anders Jacobsen (born 18 April 1968) is a former Norwegian footballer.

== Career ==
Jacobsen was born in Oslo and played his club football in Norway with Asker, Vålerenga, Lillestrøm, Skeid and Start before joining English club Sheffield United in December 1998. He played 12 times for the Blades from 1998–99 and joined Stoke City at the end of the campaign. At Stoke, Jacobsen played 44 times from 1999–2000, helping Stoke to reach the play-offs where they lost out to Gillingham. He then joined Notts County playing 34 matches from 2000–01 before returning to Norway with Asker and Skeid.

Since retiring, he has moved into management and was in charge of Norwegian Second Division team Skeid and Strømsgodset IF.

== Career statistics ==
Club	Season	League			FA Cup		League Cup		Other^{[A]}		Total	
Club	Season	Division	Apps	Goals	Apps	Goals	Apps	Goals	Apps	Goals	Apps	Goals
Sheffield United	1998–99	First Division	12	0	1	0	0	0	0	0	13	0
Stoke City	1999–2000	Second Division	33	2	1	0	3	0	7	0	44	2
Notts County	2000–01	Second Division	29	2	5	0	0	0	0	0	34	2
Career Total			74	4	7	0	3	0	7	0	91	4

A. The "Other" column constitutes appearances and goals in the Football League play-offs, and Football League Trophy.

== Honours ==
Stoke City

- Football League Trophy: 1999–2000
