= Laurence Hall =

English footballer

Personal information
- Date of birth: 26 March 1984 (age 42)
- Place of birth: Nottingham, England
- Position: Forward

Senior career*
Years	Team	Apps	(Gls)
2001–2004	Stoke City	0	(0)
2004	→ Gresley Rovers (loan)	6	(1)
- Matlock Town
- * Club domestic league appearances and goals

Laurence Hall (born 26 March 1984) is an English former footballer who played for Stoke City.

== Career ==
Hall was born in Nottingham and began his career with Stoke City. He made his professional debut on 16 October 2001 in a Football League Trophy match against Blackpool. Stoke's side featured several academy players in that match at Bloomfield Road including Kris Commons, Karl Henry, Lewis Neal, Andy Wilkinson and Brian Wilson. Speaking on his debut Hall described it as a "pleasurable experience". — "The Football League Trophy match at Blackpool was my most pleasurable game. We were 3–0 down and lost 3–2, but we could have won it". He was released by Stoke in May 2004.

== Career statistics ==
Appearances and goals by club, season and competition
Club	Season	League			FA Cup		League Cup		League Trophy		Total	
Club	Season	Division	Apps	Goals	Apps	Goals	Apps	Goals	Apps	Goals	Apps	Goals
Stoke City	2001–02	Second Division	0	0	0	0	0	0	1	0	1	0
Stoke City	2002–03	First Division	0	0	0	0	0	0	0	0	0	0
Stoke City	2003–04	First Division	0	0	0	0	0	0	0	0	0	0
Career total			0	0	0	0	0	0	1	0	1	0
