= Andy Wilkinson =

English footballer (born 1984)

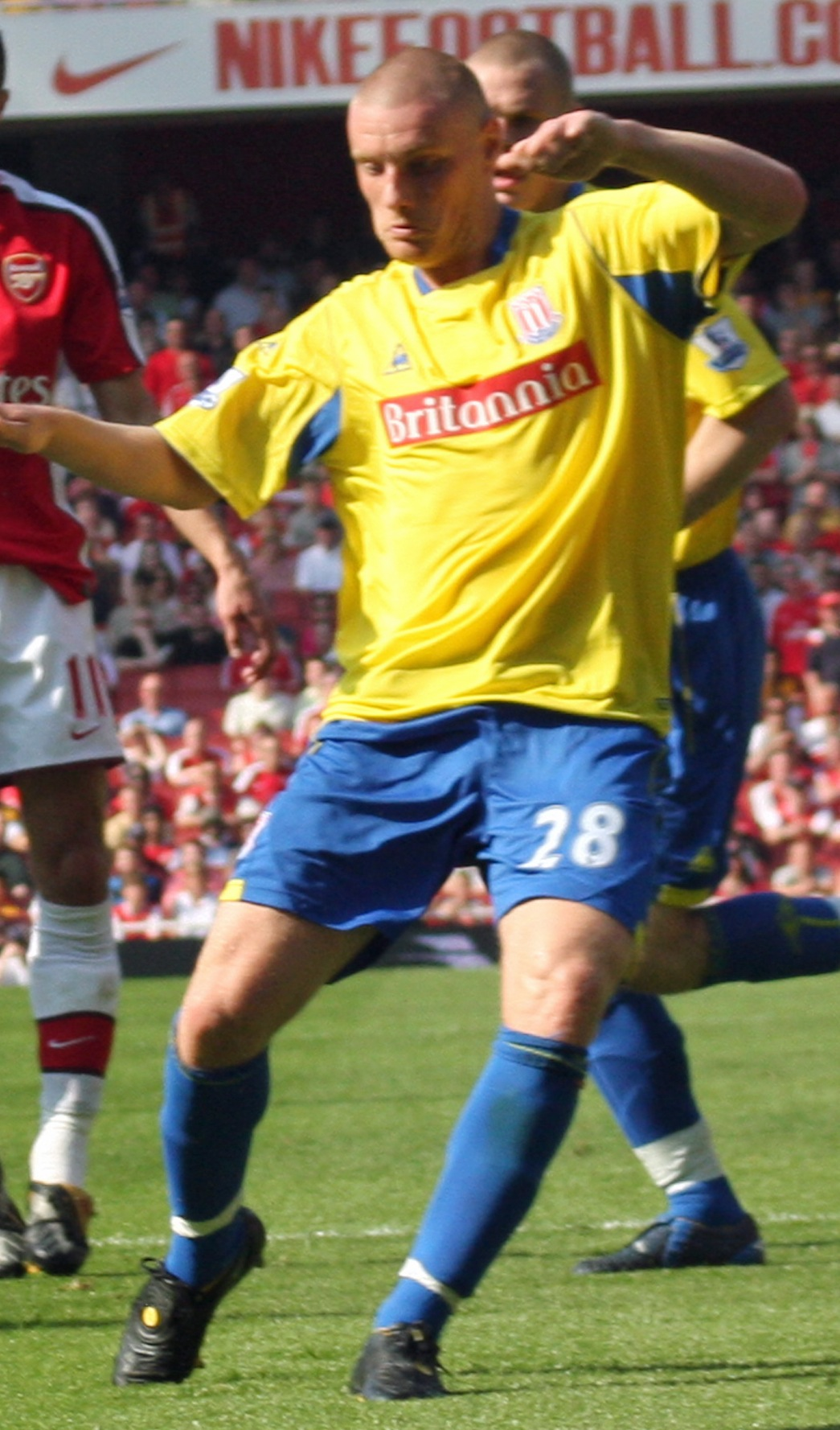
- Wilkinson playing for Stoke City in 2009

Personal information
- Full name: Andrew Gordon Wilkinson
- Date of birth: 6 August 1984 (age 42)
- Place of birth: Yarnfield, Stone, England
- Height: 5 ft 11 in (1.80 m)
- Position: Right back

Youth career
- 1997: Stone Dominoes
- 1998–2001: Stoke City

Senior career*
Years	Team	Apps	(Gls)
2001–2016	Stoke City	160	(0)
2003–2004	→ Telford United (loan)	8	(0)
2004–2005	→ Partick Thistle (loan)	12	(1)
2005	→ Shrewsbury Town (loan)	9	(0)
2006–2007	→ Blackpool (loan)	7	(0)
2014–2015	→ Millwall (loan)	9	(0)
Total		205	(1)
- * Club domestic league appearances and goals

Andrew Gordon Wilkinson (born 6 August 1984) is an English former professional footballer who played as a defender.

Wilkinson joined Stoke City's academy from his local club Stone Dominoes and made his professional debut in October 2001. Since then Wilkinson has gradually worked his way into the first team and after four loan moves and a number of injury problems had restricted his career. He broke into the side during the 2007–08 season in which Stoke were promoted to the Premier League. He helped Stoke establish themselves in the top-flight in 2008–09 and 2009–10 and he played in the 2011 FA Cup Final which Stoke lost 1–0 to Manchester City.

He played in the UEFA Europa League in 2011–12 as Stoke again finished in mid-table. He remained in the side in 2012–13 under Tony Pulis before Mark Hughes was appointed manager in May 2013 and Wilkinson became a fringe member of the squad. After failing to regain his place in the first team in 2014–15, Wilkinson joined Millwall on loan. He retired from football in February 2016 after struggling to recover from a serious head injury.

== Career ==
=== Stoke City ===
Wilkinson was born in Stone, Staffordshire, and is a graduate from Stoke City's youth academy. In 2001, he signed his first professional contract with the club. He made his Stoke City debut on 16 October 2001 in a Football League Trophy match against Blackpool, coming on as a 75th-minute substitute for Clive Clarke. His influence on the first-team may have been greater had it not have been for some unfortunate injuries which ruled him out for the entire 2002–03 season. He had to wait until the 2003–04 season to start playing again, starting the League Cup first-round tie against Rochdale.

In November 2003 Wilkinson joined Conference National side Telford United on an initial one-month loan to gain first team experience. He was sent-off in a 0–0 draw with Shrewsbury in December 2003. Despite this Telford extended his loan to February however he was recalled by Stoke in January. Wilkinson returned to Stoke where he made three appearances in the Football League. These included his league debut against Walsall on 31 January as an 80th-minute substitute for Lewis Neal and his first league start in a 4–1 victory over West Bromwich Albion on 4 May.

For the beginning of the 2004–05 season Wilkinson was loaned to Scottish Division One side Partick Thistle, for whom he scored his only professional goal against Clyde. Returning to Stoke in January 2005, he played one game against Millwall before being sent out on loan again, this time to Football League Two side Shrewsbury Town for the remainder of the season, where he made nine appearances.

In the 2005–06 season Wilkinson, made six first-team appearances before suffering ankle ligament damage playing against Southampton in April 2006, which forced him out of action for several months. In the summer of 2006 Wilkinson signed a new two-year contract keeping him at Stoke until 2008. After he recovered from his injury he was sent out on loan to Blackpool. This deal was thought to be made permanent but he managed to get a run in the Stoke side after he returned from his loan spell. Blackpool did make a £150,000 bid which was however rejected and in the end Wilkinson decided not to move. During the 2007–08 season Wilkinson broke into the first team and made 20 appearances as Stoke City were promoted to the Premier League. During the season Both Wilkinson and fellow academy product Carl Dickinson were an important part of Stoke's promotion.

On 26 December 2008 he was sent off for a second bookable offence in the game against Manchester United, despite this he kept his place in the side at the expense of club captain Andy Griffin and went on to occupy the right back position for the rest of the season. In February 2009 Wilkinson revealed that he would like to stay at Stoke City for the rest of his career. His impressive performances for Stoke led to the club offering him a new contract. On 8 July 2009 Andy Wilkinson signed a new three-year contract which kept him at Stoke until 2012 which he described as another dream.

After the arrival of Robert Huth, Wilkinson lost his place in the side and became one of a number first-team players stuck on the Stoke bench. He played in the 1–0 win over Portsmouth due to the suspension to Abdoulaye Faye, and he put in a man of the match performance and almost scored his first ever goal for Stoke by beating two Pompey defenders before shooting just over Jamie Ashdown's goal. Wilkinson himself described it as his best Stoke display yet. Wilkinson was sent-off for the second time in his Stoke career when the Potters beat Portsmouth 2–1 at Fratton Park after he committed two bookable offences on Aruna Dindane.

Wilkinson made his 100th senior appearance for Stoke on 26 September 2010 against Newcastle United. He made his 100th league appearance for Stoke on 9 April 2011 against Tottenham Hotspur. After the 5–0 FA Cup semi-final win over Bolton Wanderers Wilkinson signed a new contract keeping him at the Britannia Stadium until 2014. He played in the 2011 FA Cup Final against Manchester City as Stoke lost 1–0. Wilkinson scored his first goal in a Stoke shirt during a pre-season friendly against Austrian side SV Thal in July 2011. He almost scored his first senior goal in a match against Manchester United but his powerful shot was deflected onto the post by David de Gea. After the match Wilkinson stated that it was one of the best games he has played in. He celebrated ten years as a Stoke City player on 15 October 2011 with a 2–0 victory over Fulham. He played a major part in Stoke's Europa League run to the knock-out stages playing in eight of the club's 12 European fixtures.

Wilkinson began the 2012–13 season a decent form but was given a retrospective three match ban after an altercation with Mario Balotelli in Stoke's 1–1 draw with Manchester City. Whilst Wilkinson served his suspension new signing Geoff Cameron took his position at right back but due to Marc Wilson breaking his leg Wilkinson filled in at left back. He made his 150th league appearance for Stoke against Newcastle United on 9 March 2013. Wilkinson played in 26 matches in 2012–13 as Stoke finished in 13th position. In May 2013 Tony Pulis was replaced by Mark Hughes and Wilkinson found himself unable to get regular playing time with Hughes playing Geoff Cameron at right-back. Despite his lack to playing time he was offered a new contract by the club in February 2014. Wilkinson signed a one-year extension to his contract on 16 May 2014.

On 20 October 2014 Wilkinson joined Millwall on a three-month loan. He played nine times for the Lions before returning to Stoke in January 2015. With Wilkinson leaving Stoke at the end of the 2014–15 season he received a special recognition award for his contribution to Stoke, in total he spent 14 seasons at the Britannia Stadium making 194 appearances. On 29 July 2015 Stoke announced that Wilkinson had signed a short-term contract with the club in order to help him recover from a serious head injury he sustained playing against Blackburn Rovers in the FA Cup. Wilkinson later revealed his injury had caused some damage to his brain. Wilkinson announced his retirement from football in February 2016.

Wilkinson was granted a testimonial match by the club, which was played on 16 May 2016 attracting over 16,000 Stoke supporters.

== Coaching career ==
Wilkinson was appointed assistant manager of Stoke City U18s for the 2018–19 season.

== Personal life ==
Born in Stone, Wilkinson grew up supporting his local side Stoke City. He attended Alleyne's High School from 1997 to 2000. His mother Carolyn worked as a nurse for Douglas Macmillan and his brother Gareth is a solicitor. He has a daughter, Eva and a son, William. Wilkinson married his fiancé Emma on 25 May 2011 at local church of Whitmore parish.

Wilkinson and fellow footballer Chris Birchall used to own Zenn nightclub in Hanley, Stoke-on-Trent, which was closed in July 2008 due to debts. He was best man at Birchall's wedding in June 2012 and is also godfather to his son Ashley.

In 2015 Wilkinson set up his own property company which he called, no.28 properties.

== Career statistics ==
Appearances and goals by club, season and competition
Club	Season	League			FA Cup		League Cup		Other		Total	
Club	Season	Division	Apps	Goals	Apps	Goals	Apps	Goals	Apps	Goals	Apps	Goals
Stoke City	2001–02	Second Division	0	0	0	0	0	0	1 (Note: Appearances in Football League Trophy)	0	1	0
Stoke City	2002–03	First Division	0	0	0	0	0	0	—		0	0
Stoke City	2003–04	First Division	3	0	0	0	1	0	—		4	0
Stoke City	2004–05	Championship	1	0	0	0	0	0	—		1	0
Stoke City	2005–06	Championship	6	0	0	0	0	0	—		6	0
Stoke City	2006–07	Championship	4	0	1	0	0	0	—		5	0
Stoke City	2007–08	Championship	23	0	1	0	1	0	—		25	0
Stoke City	2008–09	Premier League	22	0	1	0	3	0	—		26	0
Stoke City	2009–10	Premier League	25	0	2	0	1	0	—		28	0
Stoke City	2010–11	Premier League	22	0	3	0	3	0	—		28	0
Stoke City	2011–12	Premier League	25	0	3	0	0	0	8 (Note: Appearances in UEFA Europa League)	0	36	0
Stoke City	2012–13	Premier League	24	0	2	0	0	0	—		26	0
Stoke City	2013–14	Premier League	5	0	0	0	1	0	—		6	0
Stoke City	2014–15	Premier League	0	0	1	0	1	0	—		2	0
Stoke City	Total		160	0	14	0	11	0	9	0	194	0
Telford United (loan)	2003–04	Football Conference	8	0	1	0	—		—		9	0
Partick Thistle (loan)	2004–05	Scottish First Division	12	1	0	0	2	0	3 (Note: Appearances in Scottish Challenge Cup)	0	17	1
Shrewsbury Town (loan)	2004–05	League Two	9	0	0	0	0	0	—		9	0
Blackpool (loan)	2006–07	League One	7	0	0	0	0	0	—		7	0
Millwall (loan)	2014–15	Championship	9	0	0	0	0	0	—		9	0
Career total			205	1	15	0	13	0	12	0	245	1

== Honours ==
Stoke City

- Football League Championship second-place promotion: 2007–08
- FA Cup runner-up: 2010–11
