= 2003–04 Stoke City F.C. season =

Stoke City
2003–04 season
- Chairman: Gunnar Gíslason
- Manager: Tony Pulis
- Stadium: Britannia Stadium
- Football League First Division: 11th (66 Points)
- FA Cup: Third Round
- League Cup: Second Round
- Top goalscorer: League: Ade Akinbiyi & Gifton Noel-Williams (10); All: Ade Akinbiyi & Gifton Noel-Williams (10)
- Highest home attendance: 20,126 vs Preston North End (26 December 2003)
- Lowest home attendance: 10,277 vs Crystal Palace (25 November 2003)
- Average home league attendance: 14,424
Home colours

The 2003–04 season was Stoke City's 97th season in the Football League and the 37th in the second tier.

With Stoke being successful in avoiding relegation manager Tony Pulis could begin making alterations to his squad for the 2003–04 season. A number of ins and outs followed but after a good start Stoke won just five of their first 21 matches and it seemed that another fight against relegation would be required. But after a win against West Ham United in December Stoke went nine matches unbeaten and pulled themselves away from relegation trouble. Their good form continued until the end of the season with Stoke ending a promising season of consolidation in 11th position with 66 points.

== Season review ==
=== League ===
Manager Tony Pulis made a number of alterations to his squad in the summer of 2003 as a number of players which helped Stoke gain promotion and subsequent survival left the club and in came several new players. These included experienced goalkeeper Ed de Goey, defenders Clint Hill and John Halls, midfielders John Eustace and Darel Russell and forwards Carl Asaba and Gifton Noel-Williams whilst the most notable departures was that of James O'Connor and fan favourite Sergei Shtanuk.

Stoke began the 2003–04 season well beating Derby County 3–0 on the opening match and then Wimbledon to see Stoke sitting top of the table after two matches. But Stoke's form soon fell away and despite the return of Ade Akinbiyi Stoke won just 5 of their first 21 fixtures which ended with a 3–2 defeat at home to Cardiff City with former fan favorite Peter Thorne scoring a hat trick but such as his popularity with the club he refused to celebrate and earned a standing ovation from the Stoke supporters. With Stoke looking likely to be involved in another scrap against relegation Pulis brought in experienced no nonsense defender Gerry Taggart and in his first match he helped Stoke claim an unlikely three points away at high-flying West Ham United. This prompted Stoke's revival and in the next match Stoke beat Reading 3–0 with a hat trick from Dutch winger Peter Hoekstra.

Stoke remained unbeaten for six more matches until their run was halted by a heavy 6–3 defeat at Crystal Palace. Whilst there was some hope from the fans that Stoke could mount a late push for a play-off spot they failed to keep a consistent run of form going and ended the season in a mid-table position of 11th. It was a promising end to the season with Stoke beating already promoted West Bromwich Albion 4–1 and the feeling around the club was that they could now begin to look for a promotion to the Premier League rather that worry about being relegated to the third tier.

=== FA Cup ===
Stoke drew Wimbledon in the third round who had now moved to Milton Keynes and after a bad tempered 1–1 draw at the National Hockey Stadium a free kick from Adam Nowland settled the replay.

=== League Cup ===
Stoke had a poor League Cup campaign as they narrowly beat Rochdale and were then knocked out 2–0 by Gillingham.

== Final league table ==
| Pos | Team | Pld | W | D | L | GF | GA | GD | Pts | Promotion, qualification or relegation |
|---|---|---|---|---|---|---|---|---|---|---|
| 9 | Reading | 46 | 20 | 10 | 16 | 55 | 57 | −2 | 70 | |
| 10 | Millwall | 46 | 18 | 15 | 13 | 55 | 48 | +7 | 69 | Qualification for the UEFA Cup first round (Note: Since the FA Cup winners Manchester United qualified for the Champions League, their place in the UEFA Cup went to Millwall, who were the FA Cup runners-up.) |
| 11 | Stoke City | 46 | 18 | 12 | 16 | 58 | 55 | +3 | 66 | |
| 12 | Coventry City | 46 | 17 | 14 | 15 | 67 | 54 | +13 | 65 | |
| 13 | Cardiff City | 46 | 17 | 14 | 15 | 68 | 58 | +10 | 65 | |

Source: Soccerway
Rules for classification: 1) points; 2) goal difference; 3) number of goals scored.

== Results ==
Stoke's score comes first

=== Legend ===
| Win | Draw | Loss |

=== Pre-season friendlies ===
| Match | Date | Opponent | Venue | Result | Attendance | Scorers |
|---|---|---|---|---|---|---|
| 1 | 13 July 2003 | Newcastle Town | A | 4–1 | | Noel-Williams, Goodfellow, Commons, Greenacre |
| 2 | 15 July 2003 | Stafford Rangers | A | 0–0 | | |
| 3 | 23 July 2003 | Germinal Beerschot | A | 0–2 | | |
| 4 | 26 July 2003 | Westerlo | A | 2–3 | | Noel-Williams, Iwelumo |
| 5 | 29 July 2003 | Notts County | A | 1–1 | | Iwelumo |
| 6 | 1 August 2003 | Macclesfield Town | A | 0–1 | | |
| 7 | 4 August 2003 | Rhyl | A | 2–4 | | Iwelumo, Commons |
| 8 | 13 August 2003 | Manchester United | H | 3–1 | 21,000 | Iwelumo, Goodfellow (2) |

=== Football League First Division ===
| Match | Date | Opponent | Venue | Result | Attendance | Scorers | Report |
|---|---|---|---|---|---|---|---|
| 1 | 9 August 2003 | Derby County | A | 3–0 | 21,517 | Noel-Williams 15', Greenacre 20', Neal 90' | Report |
| 2 | 16 August 2003 | Wimbledon | H | 2–1 | 12,550 | Asaba 26' (pen), Thomas 90+3' | Report |
| 3 | 23 August 2003 | Walsall | A | 1–1 | 9,033 | Asaba 33' | Report |
| 4 | 26 August 2003 | Millwall | H | 0–0 | 13,087 | | Report |
| 5 | 30 August 2003 | Preston North End | A | 0–1 | 12,965 | | Report |
| 6 | 6 September 2003 | Burnley | H | 1–2 | 14,867 | Asaba 53' | Report |
| 7 | 13 September 2003 | Coventry City | A | 2–4 | 13,982 | Asaba 45', Thomas 78' | Report |
| 8 | 16 September 2003 | Sunderland | H | 3–1 | 15,005 | Noel-Williams 24', Russell (2) 37', 39' | Report |
| 9 | 20 September 2003 | Norwich City | H | 1–1 | 10,672 | Noel-Williams 36' | Report |
| 10 | 27 September 2003 | West Bromwich Albion | A | 0–1 | 24,297 | | Report |
| 11 | 30 September 2003 | Rotherham United | A | 0–3 | 5,450 | | Report |
| 12 | 4 October 2003 | Nottingham Forest | H | 2–1 | 13,755 | Thomas 6', Asaba 31' | Report |
| 13 | 14 October 2003 | Wigan Athletic | A | 1–2 | 7,678 | Noel-Williams 40' | Report |
| 14 | 18 October 2003 | Ipswich Town | A | 0–1 | 22,122 | | Report |
| 15 | 25 October 2003 | Crewe Alexandra | H | 1–1 | 17,569 | Greenacre 90+1' | Report |
| 16 | 1 November 2003 | Sheffield United | H | 2–2 | 14,217 | Noel-Williams 4', Akinbiyi 18' | Report |
| 17 | 8 November 2003 | Cardiff City | A | 1–3 | 15,227 | Commons 59' | Report |
| 18 | 22 November 2003 | Bradford City | H | 1–0 | 11,661 | Eustace 11' | Report |
| 19 | 25 November 2003 | Crystal Palace | H | 0–1 | 10,277 | | Report |
| 20 | 29 November 2003 | Gillingham | A | 1–3 | 7,888 | Eustace 77' | Report |
| 21 | 6 December 2003 | Cardiff City | H | 2–3 | 12,208 | Eustace 38', Akinbiyi 74' | Report |
| 22 | 9 December 2003 | West Ham United | A | 1–0 | 24,365 | Richardson 33' | Report |
| 23 | 13 December 2003 | Reading | H | 3–0 | 11,212 | Hoekstra (3) 18', 29', 87' (1 pen) | Report |
| 24 | 20 December 2003 | Watford | A | 3–1 | 13,732 | Taggart 15', Akinbiyi (2) 55', 72' | Report |
| 25 | 26 December 2003 | Preston North End | H | 1–1 | 20,126 | Eustace 90+2' (pen) | Report |
| 26 | 28 December 2003 | Burnley | A | 1–0 | 12,812 | Akinbiyi 52' | Report |
| 27 | 10 January 2004 | Derby County | H | 2–1 | 16,402 | Akinbiyi 29', Taggart 53' | Report |
| 28 | 17 January 2004 | Wimbledon | A | 1–0 | 3,623 | Noel-Williams 54' | Report |
| 29 | 31 January 2004 | Walsall | H | 3–2 | 18,035 | Russell 8', Asaba (2) 37', 56' | Report |
| 30 | 7 February 2004 | Millwall | A | 1–1 | 9,034 | Clarke 4' | Report |
| 31 | 14 February 2004 | Crystal Palace | A | 3–6 | 16,715 | Eustace 6', Clarke 45', Asaba 83' (pen) | Report |
| 32 | 21 February 2004 | Wigan Athletic | H | 1–1 | 14,927 | Akinbiyi 45' | Report |
| 33 | 2 March 2004 | Ipswich Town | H | 2–0 | 11,435 | Hoekstra 37' (pen), Akinbiyi 68' | Report |
| 34 | 6 March 2004 | Watford | H | 3–1 | 13,108 | Akinbiyi (2) 18', 43', Noel-Williams 20' | Report |
| 35 | 13 March 2004 | Reading | A | 0–0 | 14,132 | | Report |
| 36 | 16 March 2004 | Sunderland | A | 1–1 | 24,510 | Svärd 13' | Report |
| 37 | 23 March 2004 | Crewe Alexandra | A | 0–2 | 10,014 | | Report |
| 38 | 27 March 2004 | Norwich City | A | 0–1 | 23,565 | | Report |
| 39 | 3 April 2004 | Coventry City | H | 1–0 | 12,855 | Commons 41' | Report |
| 40 | 10 April 2004 | Nottingham Forest | A | 0–0 | 28,758 | | Report |
| 41 | 12 April 2004 | Rotherham United | H | 0–2 | 11,978 | | Report |
| 42 | 17 April 2004 | Sheffield United | A | 1–0 | 19,372 | Clarke 45' | Report |
| 43 | 24 April 2004 | West Ham United | H | 0–2 | 18,227 | | Report |
| 44 | 1 May 2004 | Bradford City | A | 2–0 | 10,147 | Noel-Williams (2) 2', 46' | Report |
| 45 | 4 May 2004 | West Bromwich Albion | H | 4–1 | 18,352 | Russell 45', Commons (2) 62', 73', Noel-Williams 86' | Report |
| 46 | 9 May 2004 | Gillingham | H | 0–0 | 19,240 | | Report |

=== FA Cup ===
| Round | Date | Opponent | Venue | Result | Attendance | Scorers | Report |
|---|---|---|---|---|---|---|---|
| R3 | 4 January 2004 | Wimbledon | A | 1–1 | 3,609 | Eustace 13' | Report |
| R3 Replay | 13 January 2004 | Wimbledon | H | 0–1 | 6,463 | | Report |

=== League Cup ===
| Round | Date | Opponent | Venue | Result | Attendance | Scorers | Report |
|---|---|---|---|---|---|---|---|
| R1 | 19 August 2003 | Rochdale | H | 2–1 | 4,687 | Iwelumo 13', Goodfellow 90' | Report |
| R2 | 23 September 2003 | Gillingham | H | 0–2 | 4,607 | | Report |

== Squad statistics ==
| No. | Pos. | Name | League | | FA Cup | | League Cup | | Total | | Discipline | |
| No. | Pos. | Name | Apps | Goals | Apps | Goals | Apps | Goals | Apps | Goals | Yellow card | Red card |
|---|---|---|---|---|---|---|---|---|---|---|---|---|
| 1 | GK | (Netherlands) Ed de Goey | 37 | 0 | 0 | 0 | 1 | 0 | 38 | 0 | 1 | 0 |
| 2 | DF | (England) Wayne Thomas | 39 | 3 | 2 | 0 | 1 | 0 | 42 | 3 | 8 | 1 |
| 3 | DF | (Republic of Ireland) Clive Clarke | 41(1) | 3 | 2 | 0 | 2 | 0 | 45(1) | 3 | 10 | 0 |
| 4 | MF | (England) John Eustace | 26 | 5 | 2 | 1 | 2 | 0 | 30 | 6 | 12 | 1 |
| 6 | DF | (England) Clint Hill | 9(3) | 0 | 0 | 0 | 0 | 0 | 9(3) | 0 | 1 | 0 |
| 7 | FW | (England) Carl Asaba | 26(11) | 8 | 2 | 0 | 1 | 0 | 29(11) | 8 | 7 | 1 |
| 8 | FW | (England) Chris Greenacre | 8(5) | 2 | 1(1) | 0 | 1 | 0 | 10(6) | 2 | 1 | 0 |
| 9 | FW | (England) Gifton Noel-Williams | 40(2) | 10 | 1 | 0 | 1 | 0 | 42(2) | 10 | 2 | 1 |
| 10 | FW | (Nigeria) Ade Akinbiyi | 23(7) | 10 | 1 | 0 | 0(1) | 0 | 24(8) | 10 | 4 | 1 |
| 11 | MF | (Netherlands) Peter Hoekstra | 20(4) | 4 | 1(1) | 0 | 1 | 0 | 22(5) | 4 | 1 | 0 |
| 12 | GK | (England) Neil Cutler | 9(4) | 0 | 2 | 0 | 1 | 0 | 12(4) | 0 | 1 | 0 |
| 14 | GK | (England) Ben Foster | 0 | 0 | 0 | 0 | 0 | 0 | 0 | 0 | 0 | 0 |
| 15 | FW | (Scotland) Chris Iwelumo | 3(6) | 0 | 0(1) | 0 | 1(1) | 1 | 4(8) | 1 | 1 | 0 |
| 15 | MF | (Iceland) Brynjar Gunnarsson | 1(2) | 0 | 0 | 0 | 0 | 0 | 1(2) | 0 | 1 | 0 |
| 16 | DF | (England) Marcus Hall | 34(1) | 0 | 1 | 0 | 2 | 0 | 37(1) | 0 | 9 | 3 |
| 17 | MF | (England) Darel Russell | 46 | 4 | 2 | 0 | 2 | 0 | 50 | 4 | 6 | 0 |
| 18 | MF | (England) Lewis Neal | 6(13) | 1 | 1 | 0 | 1(1) | 0 | 8(14) | 1 | 2 | 0 |
| 19 | FW | (England) Marc Goodfellow | 0(4) | 0 | 0 | 0 | 2 | 1 | 2(4) | 1 | 1 | 0 |
| 20 | MF | (Republic of Ireland) Keith Andrews | 16 | 0 | 0 | 0 | 0 | 0 | 16 | 0 | 5 | 0 |
| 21 | MF | (Iceland) Pétur Marteinsson | 3 | 0 | 0 | 0 | 0 | 0 | 3 | 0 | 1 | 0 |
| 21 | MF | (England) John Halls | 34 | 0 | 2 | 0 | 0 | 0 | 36 | 0 | 6 | 1 |
| 22 | MF | (England) Brian Wilson | 0(2) | 0 | 0 | 0 | 0(1) | 0 | 0(3) | 0 | 0 | 0 |
| 23 | MF | (England) Karl Henry | 14(6) | 0 | 0 | 0 | 1 | 0 | 15(6) | 0 | 4 | 0 |
| 24 | MF | (Scotland) Kris Commons | 14(19) | 4 | 0(1) | 0 | 0(2) | 0 | 14(22) | 4 | 1 | 0 |
| 25 | DF | (Wales) Gareth Owen | 1(2) | 0 | 0 | 0 | 0 | 0 | 1(2) | 0 | 0 | 0 |
| 26 | DF | (England) Ryan Hutchinson | 0 | 0 | 0 | 0 | 0 | 0 | 0 | 0 | 0 | 0 |
| 27 | FW | (England) Laurence Hall | 0 | 0 | 0 | 0 | 0 | 0 | 0 | 0 | 0 | 0 |
| 28 | DF | (England) Andy Wilkinson | 1(2) | 0 | 0 | 0 | 1 | 0 | 2(2) | 0 | 0 | 0 |
| 29 | MF | (England) Paul Williams | 16(3) | 0 | 0 | 0 | 1 | 0 | 17(3) | 0 | 3 | 0 |
| 30 | FW | (England) Jermaine Palmer | 0(3) | 0 | 0 | 0 | 0 | 0 | 0(3) | 0 | 0 | 0 |
| 31 | DF | (England) Frazer Richardson | 6 | 1 | 0 | 0 | 0 | 0 | 6 | 1 | 0 | 0 |
| 32 | DF | (Northern Ireland) Gerry Taggart | 21 | 2 | 0 | 0 | 0 | 0 | 21 | 2 | 5 | 0 |
| 33 | DF | (Denmark) Sebastian Svärd | 9(4) | 1 | 1 | 0 | 0 | 0 | 10(4) | 1 | 0 | 0 |
| 35 | DF | (Australia) Richard Johnson | 3(4) | 0 | 1(1) | 0 | 0 | 0 | 4(5) | 0 | 0 | 1 |
