= Oularé =

Oularé is a surname. Notable people with the surname include:

- Obbi Oularé (born 1996), Belgian footballer
- Souleymane Oularé (born 1972), Guinean footballer
