= 2001–02 Stoke City F.C. season =

Stoke City
2001–02 season
- Chairman: Gunnar Gíslason
- Manager: Gudjon Thordarson
- Stadium: Britannia Stadium
- Football League Second Division: 5th (80 Points)
- Play-offs: Winners
- FA Cup: Third Round
- League Cup: First Round
- League Trophy: First Round
- Top goalscorer: League: Chris Iwelumo (10); All: Chris Iwelumo (12)
- Highest home attendance: 23,019 vs Port Vale (10 February 2002)
- Lowest home attendance: 9,515 vs Colchester United (26 September 2001)
- Average home league attendance: 13,996
Home colours

The 2001–02 season was Stoke City's 95th season in the Football League and the eighth in the third tier.

After two failed attempts to gain promotion via the play-offs the pressure was now on Gudjon Thordarson to achieve automatic promotion. Graham Kavanagh was sold for £1 million as well as fan favourite Peter Thorne to Cardiff City and with the money raised Stoke went out and brought some useful additions. After a slow start City went on a 10 match unbeaten run which was brought to a halt by Wigan in November. In January Stoke lost their form and fell away from automatic promotion places and it became clear that it would be the play-offs again for Stoke. And it was Cardiff who were Stoke's opponents with the first leg ending in a 2–1 win for the "Bluebirds" and it seemed that in the second leg Cardiff would hold on for a goalless draw but two very late goals gave Stoke a famous victory and they went to secure promotion by beating Brentford 2–0 in the final. It was not enough however for Gudjon Thordarson to be offered a new contract.

== Season review ==
=== League ===
The pressure was now on manager Gudjon Thordarson to finally end Stoke's spell in the Second Division with the owners wanting the club to start progressing through to the Premiership. First task Gudjon did was to sell key midfielder Graham Kavanagh to big spending Cardiff City for £1 million and with that money he brought in six new players, defender Peter Handyside from Grimsby Town who was made captain, goalkeeper Neil Cutler, Belarusian defender Sergei Shtanyuk, Belgian midfielder Jurgen Vandeurzen, David Rowson from Aberdeen and most impressively former Dutch international Peter Hoekstra. The season didn't get off the best of starts with Stoke losing 1–0 away at Queens Park Rangers but two wins over Northampton and Cambridge kick started Stoke's season. Stoke then drew 1–1 at home to Huddersfield Town with Peter Thorne scoring a 90th-minute equaliser, it proved to be his last act in a Stoke shirt as he left to join Kavanagh at Cardiff. With Stoke's main goal threat sold supporters questioned where the goals would come from, thankfully for Stoke they would be spread across the side.

After the departure of Thorne Stoke went on a fine run of results going 10 matches unbeaten putting them firmly in the hunt for automatic promotion but the run was ended by a thumping 6–1 defeat at Wigan Athletic. Stoke recovered well beating Wycombe Wanderers 5–1 but just three wins in 14 saw Stoke's grip on the top two loosen. Matters were not helped when Souleymane Oularé brought into replace Thorne suffered a life-threatening blood clot after just one appearance. With automatic promotion looking unlikely due to the form of Brighton & Hove Albion and Reading, Stoke concentrated on cementing their position in the play-offs and that's what they managed finishing the season in 5th position.

Their opponents in the play-offs were Cardiff City and the first leg at the Britannia Stadium didn't go well for Stoke with Leo Fortune-West and Robert Earnshaw putting Cardiff 2–0 up, but on loan striker Deon Burton pulled one back for Stoke late on. So Stoke went into the second leg at the notoriously hostile Ninian Park 2–1 down and with both sides missing chances the match was 0–0 after 90 minutes and in the final minute of injury time James O'Connor scored to send the match into extra time. And Stoke scored again via an O'Connor shot which deflected in of Souleymane Oularé to give Stoke the most dramatic victory. The final against Brentford was not as dramatic as Stoke won comfortably 2–0 thanks to goals from Deon Burton and an own goal from Ben Burgess. So with Stoke celebrating a return to the second tier after a longer than hoped spell in the third tier the feeling around the club was good with hopes that it could be the start of a return to the top flight. However, despite finally achieving promotion via the play-offs at the third attempt manager Gudjon Thordarson's contract was not renewed.

=== FA Cup ===
After avoiding potential upsets against non-league Lewes and Third Division Halifax Town Stoke were handed a third round tie against Everton. The "Toffees" won a close match 1–0 thanks to an Alan Stubbs free-kick in front of a capacity crowd of 28,218.

=== League Cup ===
Stoke lost to Oldham Athletic in the first round via a penalty shoot-out.

=== League Trophy ===
With priorities on gaining promotion Gudjon decided to play a second string side against Blackpool giving debuts to some of the club's best academy players most notably Andy Wilkinson. They gave a decent account of themselves losing 3–2.

== Final league table ==
Pos	Team	Pld	W	D	L	GF	GA	GD	Pts	Promotion or relegation
3	Brentford	46	24	11	11	77	43	+34	83	Qualification for the Second Division play-offs
4	Cardiff City	46	23	14	9	75	50	+25	83	Qualification for the Second Division play-offs
5	Stoke City (O, P)	46	23	11	12	67	40	+27	80	Qualification for the Second Division play-offs
6	Huddersfield Town	46	21	15	10	65	47	+18	78	Qualification for the Second Division play-offs
7	Bristol City	46	21	10	15	68	53	+15	73	

Rules for classification: In the Football League goals scored (GF) takes precedence over goal difference (GD).
(O) Play-off winners; (P) Promoted

== Results ==
Stoke's score comes first

=== Legend ===
Win	Draw	Loss

=== Pre-Season friendlies ===
Match	Date	Opponent	Venue	Result	Scorers
1	15 July 2001	Newcastle Town	A	3–0	Thorne 10' Cooke 39' Bullock 72'
2	18 July 2001	Macclesfield Town	A	1–0	Guðjónsson 44'
3	21 July 2001	Wacker Burghausen	A	3–1	Guðjónsson, Hoekstra, Gunnarsson
4	24 July 2001	FC Gratkorn	A	0–0	
5	24 July 2001	Gençlerbirliği	A	0–1	
6	27 July 2001	SV Gmunden	A	3–0	Þórðarson, Iwelumo, Cooke
7	31 July 2001	Leicester City	H	1–2	Cooke
8	4 August 2001	Derby County	H	0–0	
9	7 August 2001	Racing Club Warwick	A	4–2	Neal, Goodfellow, Iwelumo (2)

=== Football League Second Division ===
Match	Date	Opponent	Venue	Result	Attendance	Scorers	Report
1	11 August 2001	Queens Park Rangers	A	0–1	14,357		Report
2	18 August 2001	Northampton Town	H	2–0	12,845	Cooke 52', Thorne 54'	Report
3	25 August 2001	Cambridge United	A	2–0	3,336	Thorne 48', Cooke 51'	Report
4	27 August 2001	Tranmere Rovers	H	1–2	12,031	Thorne (pen) 90'	Report
5	8 September 2001	Huddersfield Town	H	1–1	13,319	Thorne 90'	Report
6	15 September 2001	Reading	H	2–0	11,752	Guðjónsson 25', Cooke 30'	Report
7	18 September 2001	Brighton & Hove Albion	A	0–1	6,627		Report
8	22 September 2001	Bury	A	1–0	4,727	Vandeurzen 32'	Report
9	26 September 2001	Colchester United	H	3–0	9,515	Vandeurzen 45', Þórðarson (2) 57', 90'	Report
10	29 September 2001	Bournemouth	H	2–0	14,803	Maher (o.g.) 11', Thomas 47'	Report
11	13 October 2001	Notts County	H	1–0	13,220	Hoekstra 47' (pen)	Report
12	21 October 2001	Port Vale	A	1–1	10,344	Iwelumo 78'	Report
13	23 October 2001	Chesterfield	A	2–1	5,141	Hoekstra (2) 67', 90' (1 pen)	Report
14	27 October 2001	Bristol City	H	1–0	16,828	Gunnarsson 88'	Report
15	3 November 2001	Swindon Town	A	3–0	7,981	Gunnarsson 28', Iwelumo 65', O'Connor 86'	Report
16	6 November 2001	Blackpool	A	2–2	4,921	Iwelumo (2) 63', 64'	Report
17	10 November 2001	Brentford	H	3–2	17,953	Gunnarsson 32' Iwelumo 49', Shtanyuk 80'	Report
18	13 November 2001	Wigan Athletic	A	1–6	7,047	Vandeurzen 9'	Report
19	21 November 2001	Oldham Athletic	H	0–0	11,031		Report
20	24 November 2001	Wrexham	A	1–0	5,477	Cooke 67'	Report
21	15 December 2001	Wycombe Wanderers	H	5–1	12,911	Gunnarsson (2) 19', 44', Iwelumo 30', Cooke 58', Goodfellow 85'	Report
22	19 December 2001	Cardiff City	H	1–1	14,331	Gabbidon 81' (o.g.)	Report
23	26 December 2001	Tranmere Rovers	A	2–2	12,201	Cooke 19', Daðason 90' (pen)	Report
24	29 December 2001	Huddersfield Town	A	0–0	16,041		Report
25	1 January 2002	Blackpool	H	2–0	16,615	Shtanyuk 13', O'Connor 82'	Report
26	13 January 2002	Northampton Town	A	1–1	5,635	Goodfellow 36'	Report
27	19 January 2002	Queens Park Rangers	H	0–1	16,725		Report
28	22 January 2002	Cardiff City	A	0–2	11,771		Report
29	26 January 2002	Wigan Athletic	H	2–2	13,361	Goodfellow 37', Daðason 67' (pen)	Report
30	29 January 2002	Peterborough United	A	2–1	5,173	Daðason 21', Goodfellow 90'	Report
31	2 February 2002	Bournemouth	A	1–3	6,027	Daðason 63' (pen)	Report
32	6 February 2002	Cambridge United	H	5–0	9,570	Cooke 22', O'Connor 27', Þórðarson 61', Tann 71' (o.g.), Goodfellow 89'	Report
33	10 February 2002	Port Vale	H	0–1	23,019		Report
34	16 February 2002	Notts County	A	0–0	7,501		Report
35	23 February 2002	Reading	A	0–1	21,023		Report
36	26 February 2002	Bury	H	4–0	9,635	Iwelumo (2) 45', 56', Vandeurzen 73', Þórðarson 84'	Report
37	1 March 2002	Brighton & Hove Albion	H	3–1	16,092	Iwelumo 29', Gunnlaugsson 58' (pen), Clarke 86'	Report
38	5 March 2002	Colchester United	A	3–1	3,866	Guðjónsson 42', Burton (2) 45', 80'	Report
39	9 March 2002	Wycombe Wanderers	A	0–1	7,344		Report
40	16 March 2002	Peterborough United	H	1–0	12,983	Gunnlaugsson 10'	Report
41	23 March 2002	Chesterfield	H	1–0	14,841	Gunnlaugsson 23'	Report
42	30 March 2002	Brentford	A	0–1	8,837		Report
43	1 April 2002	Swindon Town	H	2–0	13,530	Thomas 60', Iwelumo 68'	Report
44	6 April 2002	Oldham Athletic	A	1–2	6,548	Holden 63' (o.g.)	Report
45	13 April 2002	Wrexham	H	1–0	14,298	Cooke 30'	Report
46	20 April 2002	Bristol City	A	1–1	11,277	Cooke 16'	Report

=== Second Division play-offs ===
Round	Date	Opponent	Venue	Result	Attendance	Scorers	Report
Semi-final 1st Leg	28 April 2002	Cardiff City	H	1–2	21,245	Burton 85'	Report
Semi-final 2nd Leg	1 May 2002	Cardiff City	A	2–0 (aet)	19,367	O'Connor 90+3', Oularé 114'	Report
Final	11 May 2002	Brentford	N	2–0	42,523	Burton 10', Burgess 44' (o.g.)	Report

=== FA Cup ===
Round	Date	Opponent	Venue	Result	Attendance	Scorers	Report
R1	18 November 2001	Lewes	H	2–0	7,081	Handyside 19', Gunnarsson 57'	Report
R2	8 December 2001	Halifax Town	A	1–1	3,335	Cooke 27'	Report
R2 Replay	11 December 2001	Halifax Town	H	3–0	4,356	Guðjónsson 22', Iwelumo 27', Gunnarsson 47'	Report
R3	5 January 2002	Everton	H	0–1	28,218		Report

=== League Cup ===
Round	Date	Opponent	Venue	Result	Attendance	Scorers	Report
R1	22 August 2001	Oldham Athletic	H	0–0 (5–6 pens)	5,635		Report

=== League Trophy ===
Round	Date	Opponent	Venue	Result	Attendance	Scorers	Report
R1	16 October 2001	Blackpool	A	2–3	3,561	Iwelumo 72', Neal 83' (pen)	Report

== Squad statistics ==
No.	Pos.	Name	League		FA Cup		League Cup		League Trophy		Play-offs		Total		Discipline	
No.	Pos.	Name	Apps	Goals	Apps	Goals	Apps	Goals	Apps	Goals	Apps	Goals	Apps	Goals	Yellow card	Red card
1	GK	(England) Gavin Ward	10	0	1	0	0	0	1	0	0	0	12	0	1	0
2	DF	(Sweden) Mikael Hansson	0	0	0	0	0	0	0	0	0	0	0	0	0	0
3	DF	(Republic of Ireland) Clive Clarke	42(1)	1	3	0	0(1)	0	1	0	3	0	49(2)	1	8	0
4	DF	(Scotland) Peter Handyside	34	0	3	1	1	0	0	0	3	0	41	1	2	1
5	DF	(Belarus) Sergei Shtanyuk	40	2	4	0	1	0	0	0	3	0	48	2	15	2
6	MF	(Iceland) Brynjar Gunnarsson	21(2)	5	3	2	0	0	1	0	0	0	25(2)	7	4	0
7	MF	(Iceland) Bjarni Guðjónsson	46	3	4	1	1	0	0	0	3	0	54	4	7	0
8	FW	(England) Andy Cooke	26(9)	9	2(2)	1	0(1)	0	0	0	2(1)	0	30(13)	10	9	0
9	FW	(England) Peter Thorne	5	4	0	0	0	0	0	0	0	0	5	4	0	0
9	FW	(Guinea) Souleymane Oularé	0(1)	0	0	0	0	0	0	0	0(1)	1	0(2)	1	0	0
10	FW	(Iceland) Ríkharður Daðason	6(5)	4	0(2)	0	0	0	0	0	0(1)	0	6(8)	4	0	0
11	MF	(Netherlands) Peter Hoekstra	20(4)	3	2(1)	0	1	0	0	0	0	0	23(5)	3	1	0
12	DF	(England) Wayne Thomas	40	2	3	0	1	0	1	0	3	0	48	2	17	1
14	GK	(England) Neil Cutler	36	0	3	0	1	0	0	0	3	0	43	0	1	0
15	FW	(Scotland) Chris Iwelumo	22(16)	10	3(1)	1	0(1)	0	1	1	3	0	29(18)	12	0	0
16	FW	(Iceland) Stefán Þórðarson	3(18)	4	0	0	1	0	0	0	0	0	4(18)	4	2	0
17	MF	(Republic of Ireland) James O'Connor	43	2	4	0	0	0	0	0	3	1	50	3	7	0
18	MF	(England) Lewis Neal	6(5)	0	1(1)	0	0	0	1	1	0	0	8(6)	1	0	0
19	FW	(England) Marc Goodfellow	11(12)	5	1(2)	0	1	0	1	0	1	0	15(14)	5	1	0
20	DF	(Scotland) David Rowson	8(5)	0	1(2)	0	1	0	1	0	0	0	11(7)	0	2	0
21	MF	(Iceland) Pétur Marteinsson	2(1)	0	0	0	0	0	0	0	0	0	2(1)	0	1	0
22	MF	(Iceland) Arnar Gunnlaugsson	9	3	0	0	0	0	0	0	2	0	11	3	0	1
23	MF	(England) Karl Henry	9(15)	0	2	0	1	0	1	0	0	0	13(15)	0	2	0
24	MF	(Scotland) Kris Commons	0	0	0	0	0	0	1	0	0	0	1	0	0	0
25	DF	(Wales) Gareth Owen	0	0	0	0	0	0	0	0	0	0	0	0	0	0
26	FW	(Norway) Ole Albrigtsen	0	0	0	0	0	0	0	0	0	0	0	0	0	0
27	MF	(Belgium) Jurgen Vandeurzen	37(3)	4	4	0	1	0	0	0	0(3)	0	42(6)	4	8	0
27	MF	(England) Brian Wilson	0(1)	0	0	0	0	0	1	0	0	0	1(1)	0	0	0
28	DF	(England) Andy Wilkinson	0	0	0	0	0	0	0(1)	0	0	0	0(1)	0	0	0
29	GK	(Iceland) Birkir Kristinsson	0	0	0	0	0	0	0	0	0	0	0	0	0	0
29	MF	(England) Tony Dinning	5	0	0	0	0	0	0	0	3	0	8	0	0	0
30	GK	(England) Scott Bevan	0	0	0	0	0	0	0	0	0	0	0	0	0	0
31	GK	(Wales) Boaz Myhill	0	0	0	0	0	0	0	0	0	0	0	0	0	0
31	FW	(England) Laurence Hall	0	0	0	0	0	0	0(1)	0	0	0	0(1)	0	0	0
32	FW	(Scotland) Allan Smart	0(2)	0	0	0	0	0	0	0	0	0	0(2)	0	0	1
32	GK	(England) Danny Alcock	0	0	0	0	0	0	0	0	0	0	0	0	0	0
33	GK	(Northern Ireland) Michael Ingham	0	0	0	0	0	0	0	0	0	0	0	0	0	0
33	GK	(Finland) Jani Viander	0	0	0	0	0	0	0	0	0	0	0	0	0	0
34	DF	(England) Mike Flynn	11(2)	0	0	0	0	0	0	0	0	0	11(2)	0	2	0
35	FW	(Jamaica) Deon Burton	11(1)	2	0	0	0	0	0	0	2(1)	2	13(2)	4	1	0
36	DF	(England) Ian Brightwell	3(1)	0	0	0	0	0	0	0	0(1)	0	3(2)	0	1	0
38	MF	(England) John Miles	0(1)	0	0	0	0	0	0	0	0	0	0(1)	0	0	0
–	–	Own goals	–	4	–	0	–	0	–	0	–	1	–	5	–	–
