= Brynjar Gunnarsson =

Icelandic footballer

Personal information
- Full name: Brynjar Björn Gunnarsson
- Date of birth: 16 October 1975 (age 51)
- Place of birth: Reykjavík, Iceland
- Height: 6 ft 1 in (1.85 m)
- Position: Midfielder

Team information
- Current team: Örgryte (Manager)

Youth career
- KR

Senior career*
Years	Team	Apps	(Gls)
1995–1997	KR	50	(1)
1998	Vålerenga	4	(0)
1998	→ Moss (loan)	5	(2)
1999	Örgryte	24	(1)
1999–2003	Stoke City	131	(15)
2003–2004	Nottingham Forest	13	(0)
2003–2004	→ Stoke City (loan)	3	(0)
2004–2005	Watford	36	(3)
2005–2013	Reading	142	(9)
2013	KR	16	(2)
Total		424	(33)

International career
1993–1994	Iceland U19	11	(3)
1995–1997	Iceland U21	8	(1)
1997–2009	Iceland	74	(5)

Managerial career
- 2017: Stjarnan (assistant)
- 2018–2022: HK
- 2022: Örgryte
- * Club domestic league appearances and goals

Brynjar Björn Gunnarsson (born 16 October 1975) is an Icelandic former professional footballer who last played for KR as a midfielder. Brynjar had previously played for Nottingham Forest, Stoke City, Watford and Reading in England, as well as Vålerenga and Moss in Norway and Örgryte in Sweden. Gunnarsson is the current manager of HK in the Premier Division of Icelandic football, after helping them to a promotion in his first season with the team.

== Club career ==
Brynjar was born in Reykjavík and started his career with local club KR, playing three seasons with their senior squad. Brynjar moved to Norway in 1998 to play for Vålerenga and Moss, before joining Swedish club Örgryte in 1999. After a season at the Gamla Ullevi, English club Stoke City paid a club-record fee of £600,000 for Brynjar, with him becoming one of a number of Scandinavian players at Stoke following a take over by a group of Icelandic businessmen. He played 30 times for Stoke 1999–2000 as Stoke lost to Gillingham in the play-offs. He did play in the 2000 Football League Trophy Final as Stoke beat 2–1. In 2000–01, Brynjar missed just three matches, as Stoke again failed in the play-offs this time to Walsall, but Brynjar did win the player of the year. He struggled with injury in 2001–02, as Stoke gained promotion by beating Brentford 2–0 in the play-off final. He played in 45 games in 2002–03, as Stoke narrowly avoided relegation; at the end of the season, he left for Nottingham Forest on a free transfer.

He failed to make much of an impact at Forest and, after making just 14 appearances, he re-joined Stoke on a short-term loan. He played three times for Stoke in 2003–04 until he was released by Forest at the end of the season.

Brynjar signed for Watford in the summer of 2004, after being released by Forest. He made 43 appearances in an impressive first season. However, Ray Lewington's replacement as Watford manager, Adrian Boothroyd, to some raised eyebrows from the Watford support, allowed Brynjar to leave for Reading for a nominal fee in the summer of 2005. He helped Reading win the Championship title in 2005–06 and stay in the Premier League; in 2006–07, however, they were relegated in 2007–08. He slowly drifted in and out of the Reading side and left the club having made 163 appearances for the club scoring ten goals.

Brynjar moved to KR again, after about 15 years abroad, in March 2013. After a season in which Brynjar helped KR win the league, he retired as a player to become the assistant manager at fellow Úrvalsdeild outfit Stjarnan.

== International career ==
Brynjar made his debut for Iceland in a June 1997 World Cup qualifying match against Macedonia. He was capped more than 70 times for Iceland, scoring five goals.

== Career statistics ==
=== Club ===
Appearances and goals by club, season and competition
Club	Season	League			National cup		League cup		Other (Note: Includes Football League play-offs, Football League Trophy, Icelandic Super Cup and the UEFA Europa League.)		Total	
Club	Season	Division	Apps	Goals	Apps	Goals	Apps	Goals	Apps	Goals	Apps	Goals
KR	1995	Úrvalsdeild	16	1	1	0	–		–		17	1
KR	1996	Úrvalsdeild	18	0	1	0	–		–		19	0
KR	1997	Úrvalsdeild	16	0	0	0	–		–		16	0
KR	Total		50	1	2	0	0	0	0	0	52	1
Vålerenga	1998	Tippeligaen	4	0	0	0	–		–		4	0
Moss (loan)	1998	Tippeligaen	5	2	0	0	–		–		5	2
Örgryte	1999	Allsvenskan	24	1	0	0	–		–		24	1
Stoke City	1999–2000	Second Division	22	1	0	0	0	0	8	1	30	2
Stoke City	2000–01	Second Division	46	5	1	0	6	1	4	0	57	6
Stoke City	2001–02	Second Division	23	5	3	2	0	0	1	0	27	7
Stoke City	2002–03	First Division	40	5	3	0	1	0	0	0	44	5
Stoke City	Total		131	16	7	2	7	1	13	1	158	20
Nottingham Forest	2003–04	First Division	13	0	1	0	0	0	0	0	14	0
Stoke City (loan)	2003–04	First Division	3	0	0	0	0	0	0	0	3	0
Watford	2004–05	Championship	36	3	2	0	5	0	0	0	43	3
Reading	2005–06	Championship	29	4	4	0	1	0	0	0	34	4
Reading	2006–07	Premier League	23	3	2	1	2	0	0	0	27	4
Reading	2007–08	Premier League	20	0	0	0	0	0	0	0	20	0
Reading	2008–09	Championship	27	2	0	0	1	0	2	0	30	2
Reading	2009–10	Championship	26	0	5	0	1	0	0	0	32	0
Reading	2010–11	Championship	12	0	2	0	1	0	0	0	15	0
Reading	2011–12	Championship	5	0	0	0	0	0	0	0	5	0
Reading	2012–13	Premier League	0	0	0	0	0	0	0	0	0	0
Reading	Total		142	9	13	1	6	0	2	0	163	10
KR	2013	Úrvalsdeild	16	2	1	0	4	0	3	0	24	2
Career total			424	34	26	3	22	1	18	1	490	39

=== International ===
Appearances and goals by national team and year
National team	Year	Apps	Goals
Iceland	1997	8	2
Iceland	1998	4	0
Iceland	1999	9	1
Iceland	2000	4	0
Iceland	2001	5	0
Iceland	2002	4	0
Iceland	2003	5	0
Iceland	2004	7	0
Iceland	2005	8	1
Iceland	2006	4	0
Iceland	2007	7	1
Iceland	2008	2	0
Iceland	2009	7	0
Total		74	5

== Honours ==
Stoke City

- Football League Trophy: 1999–2000

Reading

- Football League Championship: 2005–06
