= Souleymane Oularé =

Guinean footballer

Personal information
- Date of birth: 16 October 1972 (age 54)
- Place of birth: Conakry, Guinea
- Height: 1.80 m (5 ft 11 in)
- Position: Forward

Youth career
- 1989: Horoya AC

Senior career*
Years	Team	Apps	(Gls)
1990–1991	Eeklo		
1991–1992	Sint-Niklase	24	(5)
1992–1994	Beveren	28	(8)
1994–1996	Waregem	40	(19)
1996–1999	Genk	84	(37)
1999–2000	Fenerbahçe	11	(5)
2000–2001	Las Palmas	17	(5)
2001–2003	Stoke City	1	(0)
2004	Heusden-Zolder	13	(1)
2004–2006	Visé	4	(1)
Total		222	(81)

International career
1992–2004	Guinea	23	(10)
- * Club domestic league appearances and goals

Souleymane Oularé (born 16 October 1972) is a Guinean retired professional footballer who played as a forward. His son Obbi is also a professional footballer.

== Career ==
Oularé was elected Footballer of the Year in Belgium in 1999, when he won the Belgian Championship as a striker with Racing Genk, scoring 17 goals during the season. He then went on to play for Fenerbahçe (Turkey), UD Las Palmas (Spain), Stoke City (England), K. Beringen-Heusden-Zolder and C.S. Visé (both Belgium).

Oularé signed for Stoke City in England in 2002. After his only league game for Stoke against Northampton Town in 2002 Oulare was diagnosed with a life-threatening blood clot in his lungs. He returned for the 2nd leg of the play-offs against Cardiff City and made a vital contribution. He came on after 71 minutes replacing Chris Iwelumo with Stoke 2–1 down, James O'Connor scored in the 88th minute to send the tie into extra time and then in the 115th minute an O'Connor free-kick was deflected in off Oularé's backside. This went down in folklore among Stoke City fans as they won the tie 3–2 and went on to win promotion. He never got a chance the following season and was released in 2003.

== Career statistics ==
=== Club ===
Appearances and goals by club, season and competition
Club	Season	League			National cup		League cup		Play-offs		Total	
Club	Season	Division	Apps	Goals	Apps	Goals	Apps	Goals	Apps	Goals	Apps	Goals
Sint-Niklase	1991–92	Belgian Second Division	24	5	—		—		—		24	5
Beveren	1992–93	Belgian First Division	14	5	—		—		—		14	5
Beveren	1993–94	Belgian First Division	14	3	—		—		—		14	3
Beveren	Total		28	8	0	0	0	0	0	0	28	8
Waregem	1994–95	Belgian Second Division	26	16	—		—		—		26	16
Waregem	1995–96	Belgian First Division	14	3	—		—		—		14	3
Waregem	Total		49	19	0	0	0	0	0	0	40	19
Genk	1996–97	Belgian First Division	24	4	—		—		—		24	4
Genk	1997–98	Belgian First Division	27	14	—		—		—		27	14
Genk	1998–99	Belgian First Division	31	17	—		—		—		31	17
Genk	1999–2000	Belgian First Division	2	2	—		—		—		2	2
Genk	Total		84	37	0	0	0	0	0	0	84	37
Fenerbahçe	1999–2000	1. Lig	11	5	—		—		—		11	5
Las Palmas	2000–01	La Liga	17	5	—		—		—		17	5
Stoke City	2001–02	Second Division	1	0	0	0	0	0	1	1	2	1
Stoke City	2002–03	First Division	0	0	0	0	0	0	—		0	0
Stoke City	Total		1	0	0	0	0	0	1	1	2	1
Heusden-Zolder	2003–04	Belgian First Division	13	1	—		—		—		13	1
Visé	2004–05	Belgian Second Division	0	0	—		—		—		0	0
Visé	2005–06	Belgian Third Division	4	1	—		—		—		4	1
Visé	Total		4	1	0	0	0	0	0	0	4	1
Career total			222	81	0	0	0	0	1	1	223	82

=== International ===
Appearances and goals by national team and year
National team	Year	Apps	Goals
Guinea	1992	3	3
Guinea	1993	3	0
Guinea	1994	2	0
Guinea	1997	6	2
Guinea	1998	5	3
Guinea	1999	1	1
Guinea	2000	1	0
Guinea	2004	2	1
Total		23	10

=== International goals ===
Scores and results list Guinea's goal tally first.

No.	Date	Venue	Opponent	Score	Result	Competition
1.	16 August 1992	Stade Omnisports Idriss Mahamat Ouya, N'Djamena, Chad	Chad	1–0	3–0	1994 Africa Cup of Nations qualification
2.	30 August 1992	Stade du 28 Septembre, Conakry, Guinea	Burundi	2–1	2–2	1994 Africa Cup of Nations qualification
3.	20 December 1992	Stade du 28 Septembre, Conakry, Guinea	Kenya	2–0	4–0	1994 FIFA World Cup qualification
4.	12 January 1997	Stade du 4 Août, Ouagadougou, Burkina Faso	Burkina Faso	1–0	2–0	1998 FIFA World Cup qualification
5.	8 June 1998	Stade du 28 Septembre, Conakry, Guinea	Burkina Faso	3–1	3–1	1998 FIFA World Cup qualification
6.	8 February 1998	Stade Municipal, Ouagadougou, Burkina Faso	Algeria	1–0	1–0	1998 Africa Cup of Nations
7.	11 February 1998	Stade Municipal, Ouagadougou, Burkina Faso	Cameroon	1–2	2–2	1998 Africa Cup of Nations
8.	11 February 1998	Stade Municipal, Ouagadougou, Burkina Faso	Cameroon	2–2	2–2	1998 Africa Cup of Nations
9.	24 January 1999	Stade du 28 Septembre, Conakry, Guinea	Morocco	1–0	1–1	2000 Africa Cup of Nations qualification
10.	28 April 2004	Stade Jacques-Forestier, Aix-les-Bains, France	Ivory Coast	2–2	2–4	Friendly

== Honours ==
Genk

- Belgian First Division: 1998–99
- Belgian Cup: 1997–98

Stoke City

- Football League Second Division play-offs: 2002
