= Karl Henry =

English footballer

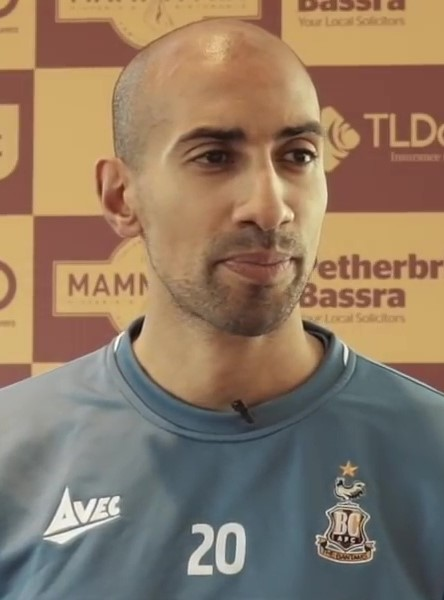
- Henry in 2018

Personal information
- Full name: Karl Levi Daniel Henry
- Date of birth: 26 November 1982 (age 43)
- Place of birth: Wolverhampton, England
- Height: 6 ft 1 in (1.85 m)
- Position: Midfielder

Team information
- Current team: Boldmere St. Michaels Women (manager)

Youth career
- 1998–1999: Stoke City

Senior career*
Years	Team	Apps	(Gls)
1999–2006	Stoke City	120	(1)
2004	→ Cheltenham Town (loan)	9	(1)
2006–2013	Wolverhampton Wanderers	250	(6)
2013–2017	Queens Park Rangers	112	(2)
2017–2018	Bolton Wanderers	33	(1)
2018	Bradford City	4	(0)
Total		528	(11)

International career
2001	England U18	1	(0)
2002	England U20	2	(0)

Managerial career
- 2024–: Boldmere St. Michaels Women
- * Club domestic league appearances and goals

Karl Levi Daniel Henry (born 26 November 1982) is an English footballer who played as a midfielder. He is currently manager of Boldmere St. Michaels Women.

Henry was a product of the Stoke City academy who went on to make over 120 appearances for the club, also spending time on loan at Cheltenham Town in 2004. He joined his hometown club Wolverhampton Wanderers in 2006, and went on to become captain of the side in the Premier League. Henry spent seven seasons at Wolves, making 272 appearances in all competitions.

He joined Queens Park Rangers in the summer of 2013 and helped them to victory in the 2014 Championship play-off final. In 2017, after four years with QPR, he was released from the club upon the expiry of his contract; he later played for Bolton Wanderers and Bradford City before retiring in 2019.

Karl Henry now has two sons called Marley Henry(12) and Monty Henry (8) who both are coached by him playing for their local football team Boldmere St. Michaels.

== Club career ==
=== Stoke City ===
Born in Wolverhampton, West Midlands, Henry began his career as a youth player for Stoke City in 1998. He made his first team debut on 7 February 2001 in a 4–0 Football League Trophy victory against Walsall. He broke into the first team under Gudjon Thordarson in 2001–02 making 28 appearances as Stoke gained promotion via the play-offs. Henry went on again to feature regularly for Stoke in the 2002–03 season making 22 appearances as Stoke narrowly avoided relegation. He scored his first and only goal for Stoke in a 4–2 defeat against Bradford City on 26 December 2002. This saw him selected for the England under 18, 20 and 21 squads.

Henry was unable to hold down a regular starting role in the 2003–04 season and was loaned out to Third Division side Cheltenham Town on a two-month deal in January 2004. Henry played nine times for the Robins scoring once against Mansfield Town. Henry came back into the first team following his loan spell and at the end of the season he signed a new contract.

The 2004–05 and 2005–06 seasons saw Henry play a bit part role for Stoke mainly being used as a substitute. He made 15 starts for Stoke in each season and overall made a total of 34 substitute appearances.

In the summer of the 2006–07 season Henry was out of contract, and although officially a free agent, was still training with Stoke City. The club allowed him to go on trial at Wolverhampton Wanderers, who he joined permanently in August 2006 for a fee of £100,000.

=== Wolverhampton Wanderers ===
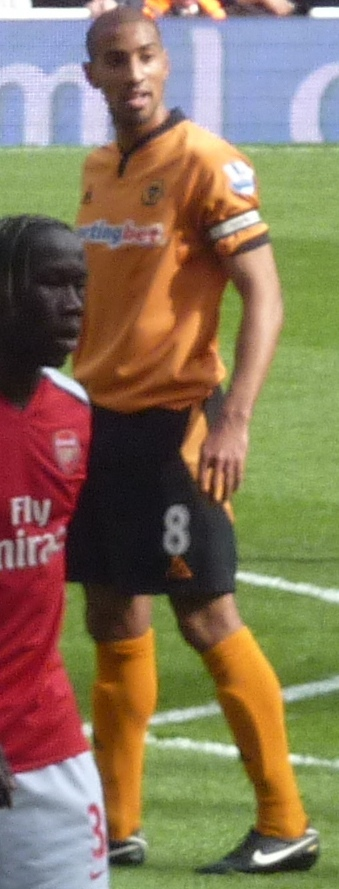
Henry playing for Wolverhampton Wanderers in 2010

Henry joined his hometown club on a three-year contract in August 2006 a week before the start of the 2006–07 season. He made his Wolverhampton Wanderers debut and his first start for his new club against Plymouth Argyle on the opening day of the season. Henry spent most of his first season filling in at right back and playing a few games in central midfield.

He was appointed captain for the first time in December 2006 as Jody Craddock was out injured. Henry's first season for Wolves came to an end when he suffered a serious injury in the game against Luton Town on 3 March 2007. Henry bruised his spleen and was forced to sit out the remainder of the 2006–07 season, which saw him miss out on the Championship play-offs. He made a total of 34 appearances in his first season for Wolves, scoring three goals.

In the 2007–08 season, Henry again impressed for Wolves after holding down his position in the centre of midfield. He went on to make a total of 42 appearances for Wolves, scoring three goals again. These goals came against Preston North End and two against Charlton Athletic, both home and away. Henry also picked up an injury against Charlton on 29 March 2008, which saw him miss the last six games of the season.

The 2008–09 season saw Henry impress again for Wolves and he was also handed the captain's armband for the majority of the season as Jody Craddock was out injured. He was an integral part of the team which made an impressive start to the season as Wolves were at the top of the table for numerous months with Henry captaining them. He was in the starting 11 against Queens Park Rangers in which Wolves went on to win the game which resulted in them gaining promotion to the Premier League. On 3 May 2009, Henry and Craddock both lifted the Championship trophy at Molineux on the final day of the season after their 1–0 over Doncaster Rovers.

Henry was an ever-present captain in the Wolves team in the 2009–10 season, his Premier League debut came against West Ham United on the opening day. He went on to make 34 appearances for Wolves during 2009–10, missing only four games, as Wolves stayed up at the end of their first season in the Premier League.

During the 2010–11 season, Henry made 31 Premier League appearances as captain. On the last day of the season, on 22 May 2011, Wolverhampton Wanderers stayed in the Premier League after finishing 17th.

A start of the new season, new signing Roger Johnson replaced Henry as club captain. Henry started Wolves' first three games in the 2011–12 season, including the 0–0 draw away at local rivals Aston Villa. Before the match between QPR and Wolves, Henry threw down the gauntlet on Joey Barton as they prepared to go head-to-head at Molineux. The two (both Joey Barton and Karl Henry) were involved in a physical confrontation in August 2010 when Barton was still at Newcastle. The confrontation occurred after Henry made a number of strong tackles on Barton. During the match between QPR and Wolves, which QPR won 3–0, Henry continued his strong challenges on Barton, who hit back by making claims that Henry 'tries to hurt people'. Henry says Barton was 'embarrassing' after recent comments. Henry was taunted by a section of the Molineux crowd after being substituted, when Wolves were defeated by Newcastle United by a score of 1–2. He was defended by Wolves captain at the time, Roger Johnson.

With the arrival of Kenny Jackett as manager, Henry was transfer listed, despite his contract still having three more years to run.

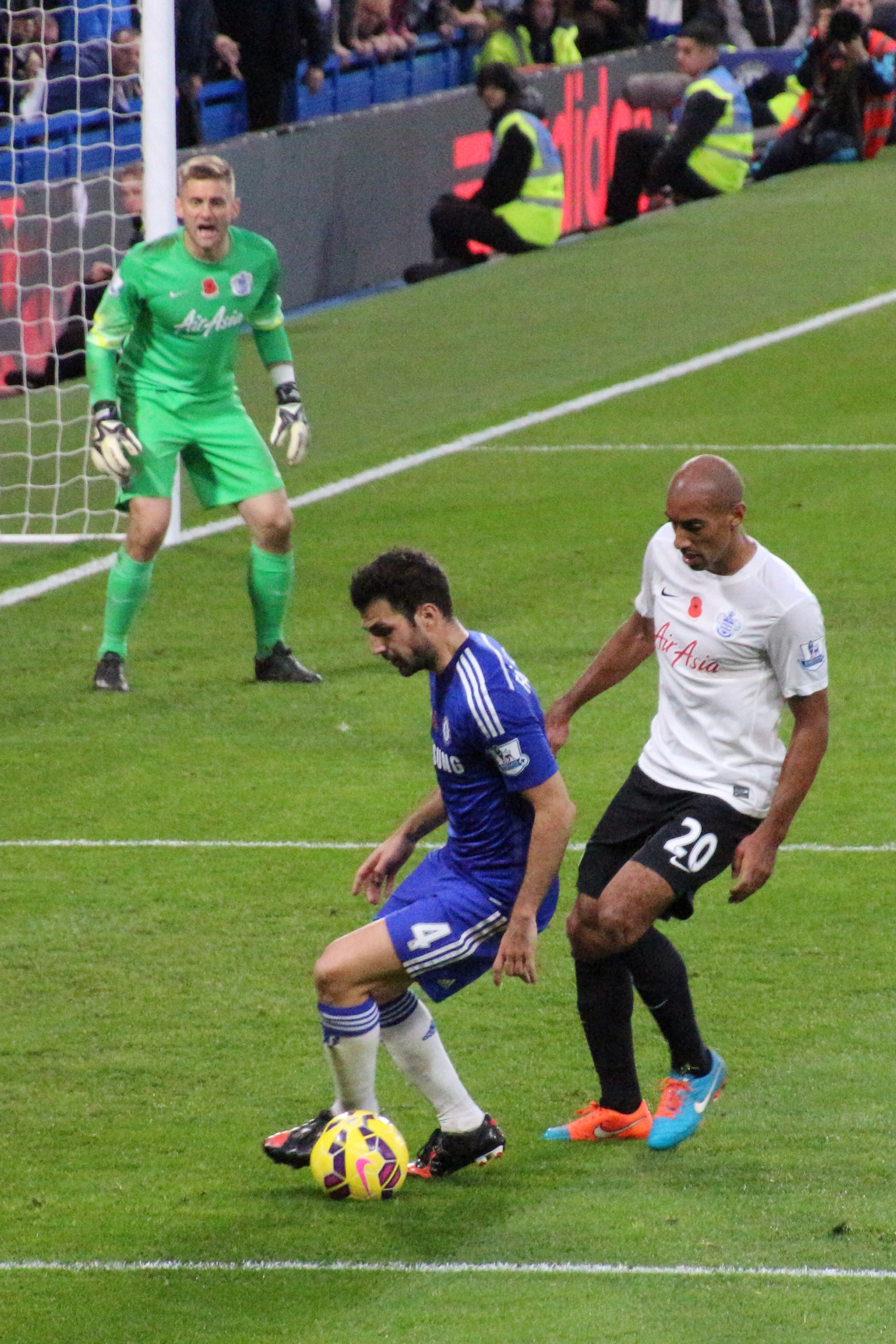
Henry (wearing white) playing for Queens Park Rangers in the West London derby against Chelsea, 2014

=== Queens Park Rangers ===
Henry signed for Championship side Queens Park Rangers on 23 July 2013 for an undisclosed fee. He scored his first goal for the club against future employers Bolton Wanderers on 28 January 2014.

=== Bolton Wanderers ===
On 25 September 2017, Henry signed a contract with Championship side Bolton Wanderers on a deal until the end of the season. He made his first appearance for a Bolton the next day, playing the full 90 minutes of a 2–0 away defeat to Bristol City in the Championship. He was released by Bolton at the end of the 2017–18 season.

=== Bradford City ===
He signed a two-month contract with Bradford City on 23 November 2018, making his début for the club in the 2–0 win over Oxford United the following day. On Christmas Eve, he left Bradford by mutual consent.

=== Retirement ===
In August 2019, after eight months without a club, Henry announced his retirement from football.

== International career ==
On 8 October 2008, Henry was approached by manager John Barnes to play for Jamaica. On 20 February 2011, Henry was named in the 40-man England provisional squad for the game against Denmark, but did not make the final cut of 26.

== Coaching career ==
In June 2022, Henry took up a coaching role in the academy of Northern Premier League Division One Midlands club Boldmere St. Michaels. In June 2024, he was appointed manager of Boldmere St. Michaels Women.

== Personal life ==
As a child Henry suffered from acute asthma. Henry grew up supporting his local side Wolverhampton Wanderers. Henry is a supporter of the Conservative Party.

== Career statistics ==
Appearances and goals by club, season and competition
Club	Season	League			FA Cup		League Cup		Other		Total	
Club	Season	Division	Apps	Goals	Apps	Goals	Apps	Goals	Apps	Goals	Apps	Goals
Stoke City	2000–01	Second Division	0	0	0	0	0	0	1 (Note: Appearance in Football League Trophy)	0	1	0
Stoke City	2001–02	Second Division	24	0	2	0	1	0	1	0	28	0
Stoke City	2002–03	First Division	18	1	3	0	1	0	—		22	1
Stoke City	2003–04	First Division	20	0	0	0	1	0	—		21	0
Stoke City	2004–05	Championship	34	0	1	0	1	0	—		36	0
Stoke City	2005–06	Championship	24	0	3	0	1	0	—		28	0
Stoke City	Total		120	1	9	0	5	0	2	0	136	1
Cheltenham Town (loan)	2003–04	Third Division	9	1	—		—		—		9	1
Wolverhampton Wanderers	2006–07	Championship	34	3	3	0	1	0	0	0	38	3
Wolverhampton Wanderers	2007–08	Championship	40	3	2	0	2	0	—		44	3
Wolverhampton Wanderers	2008–09	Championship	43	0	2	0	2	0	—		47	0
Wolverhampton Wanderers	2009–10	Premier League	34	0	3	1	1	0	—		38	1
Wolverhampton Wanderers	2010–11	Premier League	29	0	2	0	0	0	—		31	0
Wolverhampton Wanderers	2011–12	Premier League	31	0	1	0	1	0	—		33	0
Wolverhampton Wanderers	2012–13	Championship	39	0	1	0	1	0	—		41	0
Wolverhampton Wanderers	Total		250	6	14	1	8	0	0	0	272	7
Queens Park Rangers	2013–14	Championship	27	1	1	0	0	0	1 (Note: Appearance in Championship play-offs)	0	29	1
Queens Park Rangers	2014–15	Premier League	33	0	1	0	1	0	—		35	0
Queens Park Rangers	2015–16	Championship	38	1	0	0	1	0	—		39	1
Queens Park Rangers	2016–17	Championship	14	0	0	0	1	0	—		15	0
Queens Park Rangers	Total		112	2	2	0	3	0	1	0	118	2
Bolton Wanderers	2017–18	Championship	33	1	0	0	0	0	0	0	33	1
Bradford City	2018–19	League One	4	0	2	0	0	0	0	0	6	0
Boldmere St. Michaels	2023–24	Northern Premier League; Division One Midlands	0	0	1	0	—		—		1	0
Career total			528	11	28	1	16	0	3	0	575	12

== Honours ==
Wolverhampton Wanderers

- Football League Championship: 2008–09

Queens Park Rangers

- Football League Championship play-offs: 2014
