= Wayne Thomas (footballer, born 1979) =

English footballer

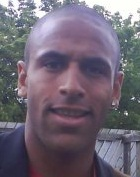
- Thomas in 2007

Personal information
- Full name: Wayne Junior Robert Thomas
- Date of birth: 17 May 1979 (age 47)
- Place of birth: Gloucester, England
- Height: 5 ft 11 in (1.80 m)
- Position: Defender

Youth career
- ?–1995: Torquay United

Senior career*
Years	Team	Apps	(Gls)
1995–2000	Torquay United	123	(5)
2000–2005	Stoke City	189	(7)
2005–2007	Burnley	50	(1)
2007–2010	Southampton	45	(1)
2010–2011	Doncaster Rovers	21	(0)
2011–2012	Atromitos	22	(0)
2012–2013	Veria	4	(0)
2013	Luton Town	2	(0)
2013	→ Rochdale (loan)	2	(0)
2013–2014	Tamworth	22	(1)
2014–2016	Worcester City	49	(2)
2016–2017	Kidderminster Harriers	3	(0)
2016	→ Altrincham (loan)	2	(0)
2017	→ Stratford Town (loan)	5	(1)
2017–2018	Worcester City	2	(0)
Total		541	(18)

Managerial career
- 2015: New York Red Bulls (academy)
- 2016–2017: Kidderminster Harriers U19 (coach)
- 2017: Rushall Olympic
- * Club domestic league appearances and goals

Wayne Junior Robert Thomas (born 17 May 1979) is an English retired footballer and current football coach. He is currently working as a PE teacher at Haberdashers' Boys' School. In 2015, he was employed as an academy coach at the New York Red Bulls. Thomas played as a defender and has represented twelve clubs, including Torquay United, Stoke City, Burnley and Southampton.

== Playing career ==
=== Stoke City ===
Thomas was born in Gloucester and began his career playing for Torquay United. He soon became a regular in the side, and made more than 100 league appearances for them. His performances soon brought attention from larger clubs, with Stoke City, then in the Second Division, winning the race for his signature in the summer of 2001, paying a transfer fee of £200,000. He soon became a regular in the side and made 45 appearances during the 2000–01 season as Stoke lost to Walsall in the play-offs.

In the 2001–02 season Thomas helped Stoke achieve promotion through the play-offs with a 2–0 win against Brentford at the Millennium Stadium in the final. Despite the promotion, Thordarson was sacked and replaced by Steve Cotterill, who in turn was manager for just five months before he resigned amidst much controversy to become assistant manager at Sunderland.

After a short spell under the caretaker manager, Dave Kevan, Tony Pulis became the new manager of Stoke. Thomas' career flourished under Pulis and so, with his contract running out in the summer of 2005, several Championship clubs were looking to sign him on a free transfer after he stated that he was unhappy with Stoke taking too long to offer him a new contract.

=== Burnley ===
The race was eventually won by Cotterill, then managing Burnley, after Cotterill flew out to the player's holiday home in Florida to persuade him. He scored his first and what turned out to be only goal for Burnley against Coventry City on 13 August 2005, but his first season as a Burnley player was an unsuccessful one, as he was hit with two serious injuries: first tearing his knee ligaments and then, after a surprisingly quick recovery, breaking his second metatarsal bone. This second injury ended his season.

Thomas was made club captain when the 2006–07 season kicked off. He had a difficult start to the season, being deemed at least partially at fault for some goals conceded and being sent off twice before the end of September, however Cotterill showed faith in him by retaining him as captain on his return from suspension. Although his form improved, he was replaced as captain in February 2007 by recent signing Steven Caldwell.

=== Southampton ===
In August 2007, Thomas signed for Southampton in a £1.2 million deal. Accorfing to Cotterill, there had been several lower offers, but "when it hit £1.2million it was a time we decided to sell". Thomas made his debut in Southampton's 2–1 defeat away to Norwich City. He scored his first goal for Southampton against Charlton in the Football League Trophy on 11 November 2009; it was his first goal in over four years. He then scored with a 20 yd (18 m) half-volley in a 2–1 FA Cup victory over Ipswich Town.

Thomas was one of 13 players to be released by Southampton at the end of the 2009–10 season.

=== Doncaster Rovers ===
Thomas joined up with his old club Stoke City for pre-season training, before signing for Doncaster Rovers on 10 August on an initial one-year contract. Rovers released him at the end of the season.

=== Spell in Greek football ===
On 8 July 2011, Thomas signed for Atromitos of Super League Greece. He made his unofficial Atromitos debut in a friendly game against Panathinaikos in Peristeri, which ended 0–0. He was replaced in the 55th minute by Limnios. After this match, he played against Panetolikos Agrinio in a friendly game in Peristeri. This match ended also 0–0, but in this game, Thomas played the whole match. After the match with Panetolikos, he had to defend his team against Asteras. He managed to do it brilliantly, as when his team conceded the goal he had been substituted. He played 45 minutes, and Atromitos lost 0–1. On 2 September 2011, Atromitos was playing against AEL in Larissa. Thomas played for the whole match with Atromitos losing 2–1 in a match in memory of Panagiotis Bahramis, who died in an accident in 2010.

On 21 August 2012, Thomas signed a contract with Super League Greece side Veria. He played four times for Veria before returning to England.

=== Later career ===
Thomas returned to England in January 2013 and on 4 February he joined Conference Premier side Luton Town until the end of the 2012–13 season. He was sent off in only his second game for Luton, and subsequently joined League Two side Rochdale on loan on 28 March, where he played in two games. Thomas was not offered a contract extension and left Luton in May 2013.

Thomas joined Conference Premier side Tamworth on 9 August 2013. Alongside his role at Tamworth, Thomas was the under-11s academy coach at Premier League club Stoke City.

He joined Worcester City on 28 January 2014. On 18 October 2014, in a match against Harrogate Town, Worcester were without a recognised goalkeeper after Jose Veiga suffered an injury, so Thomas played in goal and kept a clean sheet in a 2–0 win.

== Coaching and managerial career ==
In March 2015, Thomas was appointed as an academy coach with the New York Red Bulls.

He went back to playing football in 2016, when he signed with Kidderminster Harriers. He was sent out on loan to Altrincham for a month, and after his return, apart from being a player, he also earned a role as a coach for the under-19 squad. Later in the 2016–17 season, he spent a month on loan at Southern League Premier Division side Stratford Town.

In May 2017, he was appointed as the new manager of Rushall Olympic while continuing in his coaching role at Kidderminster. He was dismissed by Rushall in October 2017.

In October 2017, Thomas returned to Worcester City as a player; on his second début for the club, he was sent off for raising his arms to an opponent.

In March 2018, Thomas left Worcester City to take a job at a West Bromwich Albion soccer school in China.

== Career statistics ==
Appearances and goals by club, season and competition
Club	Season	League			National cup		League cup		Other		Total	
Club	Season	Division	Apps	Goals	Apps	Goals	Apps	Goals	Apps	Goals	Apps	Goals
Torquay United	1995–96	Third Division	6	0	0	0	0	0	0	0	6	0
Torquay United	1996–97	Third Division	12	0	0	0	0	0	0	0	12	0
Torquay United	1997–98	Third Division	21	1	2	0	1	0	4 (Note: Three appearances in Third Division play-offs and one in Football League Trophy)	0	28	1
Torquay United	1998–99	Third Division	44	1	1	0	2	1	2 (Note: Appearances in Football League Trophy)	0	49	2
Torquay United	1999–2000	Third Division	40	3	4	1	0	0	3	0	47	4
Torquay United	Total		123	5	7	1	3	1	9	0	142	7
Stoke City	2000–01	Second Division	34	0	1	0	4	0	6 (Note: Two appearances in Second Division play-offs and four in Football League Trophy)	0	45	0
Stoke City	2001–02	Second Division	40	2	3	0	1	0	4 (Note: Three appearances in Second Division play-offs and one in Football League Trophy)	0	48	2
Stoke City	2002–03	First Division	41	0	3	0	1	0	—		45	0
Stoke City	2003–04	First Division	39	3	2	0	1	0	—		42	3
Stoke City	2004–05	Championship	35	2	1	1	1	0	—		37	3
Stoke City	Total		189	7	10	1	8	0	10	0	217	8
Burnley	2005–06	Championship	16	1	1	0	1	0	—		18	1
Burnley	2006–07	Championship	33	0	1	0	1	0	—		35	0
Burnley	2007–08	Championship	1	0	0	0	0	0	—		1	0
Burnley	Total		50	1	2	0	2	0	—		54	1
Southampton	2007–08	Championship	30	0	2	0	0	0	—		32	0
Southampton	2008–09	Championship	0	0	0	0	1	0	—		1	0
Southampton	2009–10	League One	15	0	4	1	2	0	5	1	26	2
Southampton	Total		45	0	6	1	3	0	5	1	59	2
Doncaster Rovers	2010–11	Championship	21	0	0	0	0	0	0	0	21	0
Atromitos	2011–12	Super League Greece	22	0	4	0	—		4	1	30	1
Veria	2012–13	Super League Greece	4	0	0	0	—		0	0	4	0
Luton Town	2012–13	Conference Premier	2	0	0	0	—		0	0	2	0
Rochdale (loan)	2012–13	League Two	2	0	0	0	0	0	0	0	2	0
Tamworth	2013–14	Conference Premier	22	1	2	0	—		0	0	24	1
Worcester City	2013–14	Conference North	11	0	0	0	—		0	0	11	0
Worcester City	2014–15	Conference North	22	1	4	0	—		0	0	26	1
Worcester City	2015–16	National League North	16	1	2	0	—		1 (Note: Appearances in FA Trophy)	0	19	1
Worcester City	Total		49	2	6	0	—		1	0	56	2
Kidderminster Harriers	2016–17	National League North	3	0	0	0	—		1	0	3	0
Altrincham (loan)	2016–17	National League North	2	0	0	0	—		0	0	2	0
Stratford Town (loan)	2016–17	Southern League Premier Division	5	1	0	0	—		0	0	5	1
Worcester City	2017–18	Midland Football League	2	0	0	0	—		0	0	2	0
Career total			541	17	37	3	16	1	30	2	623	23

== Honours ==
Stoke City

- Football League Second Division play-offs: 2002

Individual

- Stoke City Player of the Year: 2001–02
