= Clive Clarke =

Irish former footballer

Personal information
- Full name: Clive Richard Luke Clarke
- Date of birth: 14 January 1980 (age 46)
- Place of birth: Dublin, Ireland
- Height: 6 ft 1 in (1.85 m)
- Position: Left-back

Youth career
- 1996–1998: Stoke City

Senior career*
Years	Team	Apps	(Gls)
1999–2005	Stoke City	223	(9)
2005–2006	West Ham United	2	(0)
2006–2008	Sunderland	4	(0)
2006	→ Coventry City (loan)	12	(0)
2007	→ Leicester City (loan)	2	(0)
Total		242	(9)

International career
1999	Republic of Ireland U18	4	(0)
1999–2001	Republic of Ireland U21	8	(0)
2004	Republic of Ireland	2	(0)
- * Club domestic league appearances and goals

Clive Richard Luke Clarke (born 14 January 1980) is an Irish former professional footballer. He played primarily as a left-back, but also as centre-back, left midfielder or centre midfielder, notably for Stoke City and twice for the Ireland international team.

== Club career ==
=== Stoke City ===
Clarke started playing football with local club Newtown Schoolboys in his home town of Newtownmountkennedy, County Wicklow. He joined Stoke City as a trainee in August 1996, making his debut against Oldham Athletic in May 1999. He quickly became a regular in the team, making 55 appearances in the 1999–2000 season and 33 appearances in the 2000–01 season. In both seasons Stoke reached the play-offs where they lost to Gillingham and Walsall respectively. However he played as they won the 2000 Football League Trophy final. Although he was dropped from the side in February 2001, which prompted him to hand in a transfer request.

However, he returned to the side in 2001–02 and helped Stoke gain promotion by beating Brentford in the 2002 Football League Second Division play-off final. He played 32 times in 2002–03 as Stoke narrowly avoided relegation. He made 44 appearances in both the 2003–04 and 2004–05 campaigns. He left for West Ham United in the summer of 2005 after making 264 appearances for Stoke City in nine years.

=== West Ham United ===
Clarke signed for West Ham for a fee of £275,000 at the end of July 2005, brought to the club by the then manager, Alan Pardew, who wanted another left-sided player. He made only three appearances for West Ham and, in August 2006, moved to Sunderland in a deal that saw George McCartney move to Upton Park.

=== Sunderland ===
Clarke joined Sunderland as a replacement for the injured George McCartney. However, he made only four appearances before joining Coventry City on loan in October 2006 until January 2007 after which he returned to Sunderland. He made twelve appearances for Coventry but made no further appearances for Sunderland after returning from loan.

Clarke later signed a three-month loan deal with Leicester City on 16 August 2007. During the League Cup tie between Nottingham Forest and Leicester on 28 August 2007, Clarke collapsed and suffered a cardiac arrest in the changing rooms at the City Ground causing the match to be abandoned at half-time, with the score at 1–0. It was reported by the BBC that Clarke was being treated in the emergency room at the Queen's Medical Centre in Nottingham. He was said to be 'stable' and would be kept in overnight.

In an act of sportsmanship, Leicester allowed Forest to score the opening goal on the re-match to regain the advantage they had when the first game was abandoned. Leicester players stood aside to allow Forest goalkeeper Paul Smith to take in the ball from the kick-off. Reportedly even the bookmakers decided to pay out on the scorer of the first contested goal as well as paying out on both the 3–2 official result and the 3–1 "real" scoreline.

Clarke told the BBC on 2 September 2007 that he felt lucky to be alive.

"I remember feeling a bit lethargic on the field in the first half, and I was involved in a collision with our goalkeeper Paul Henderson, which led to their goal. I sat quietly in a corner of the dressing room and felt a bit queasy. I can recall Patrick Kisnorbo talking to me, but it wasn't really registering. Then I just passed out. When I was told what had happened, the blood drained from my body. I just thought I could have been dead, and that I might never have seen my family again. When you think about Sevilla player Antonio Puerta (who collapsed last Saturday and died on Tuesday), it goes without saying that a day won't pass when I don't cherish every moment in my life".

Clarke told Sky Sports on 12 September 2007 that he was still hopeful of playing again, but he never made another appearance for Leicester following the incident, and he returned to Sunderland in November 2007. He left Sunderland by mutual agreement in February 2008 after medical advice.

== International career ==
Clarke was a Republic of Ireland Under 21 player, and has two caps for the Republic of Ireland senior team, against Nigeria and against Jamaica, both during the 2004 Unity Cup.

== Personal life ==
After retiring from football due to health problems, Clarke became a football agent. He is the uncle of Republic of Ireland international footballer Mason Melia.

== Career statistics ==
=== Club ===
Appearances and goals by club, season and competition
Club	Season	League			FA Cup		League Cup		Other		Total	
Club	Season	Division	Apps	Goals	Apps	Goals	Apps	Goals	Apps	Goals	Apps	Goals
Stoke City	1998–99	Second Division	2	0	0	0	0	0	0	0	2	0
Stoke City	1999–2000	Second Division	42	1	1	0	4	0	8 (Note: Six appearances in Football League Trophy and two in Second Division play-offs)	0	55	1
Stoke City	2000–01	Second Division	21	0	2	0	6	0	5 (Note: Three appearances and goal in Football League Trophy and two in Second Division play-offs)	1	34	1
Stoke City	2001–02	Second Division	43	1	3	0	1	0	4 (Note: One appearance in Football League Trophy and three in Second Division play-offs)	0	51	1
Stoke City	2002–03	First Division	31	3	0	0	1	0	—		32	3
Stoke City	2003–04	First Division	42	3	2	0	2	0	—		46	3
Stoke City	2004–05	Championship	42	1	1	0	1	0	—		44	1
Stoke City	Total		223	9	9	0	15	0	17	1	264	10
West Ham United	2005–06	Premier League	2	0	0	0	1	0	—		3	0
Sunderland	2006–07	Championship	4	0	0	0	0	0	—		4	0
Coventry City (loan)	2006–07	Championship	12	0	0	0	0	0	—		12	0
Leicester City (loan)	2007–08	Championship	2	0	0	0	0	0	—		2	0
Career total			243	9	9	0	16	0	17	1	285	10

=== International ===
Appearances and goals by national team and year
National team	Year	Apps	Goals
Republic of Ireland	2004	2	0
Total		2	0

== Honours ==
Stoke City

- Football League Second Division play-offs: 2002
- Football League Trophy: 1999–2000
