= 2002 Football League Second Division play-off final =

Football match

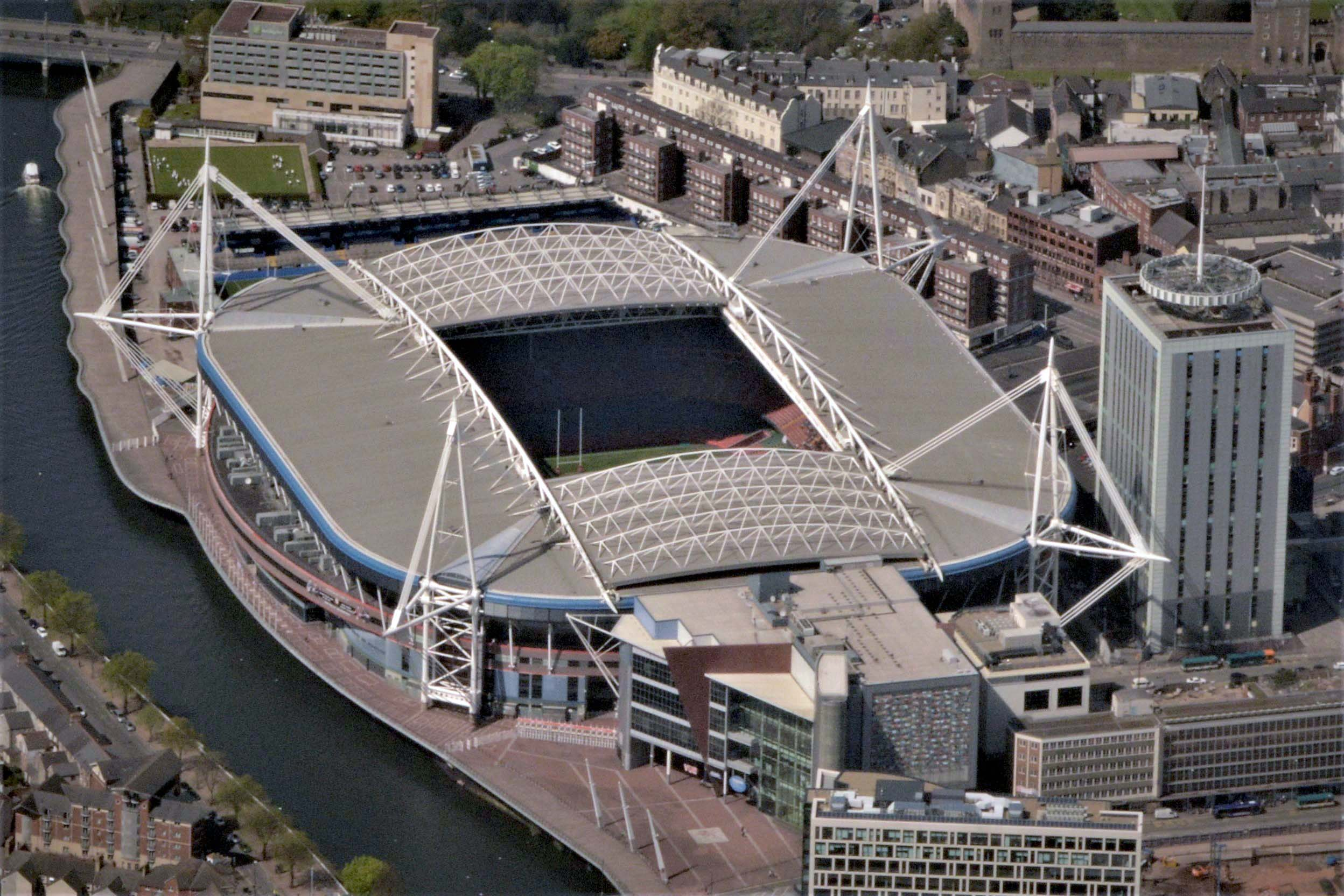
- The final took place at the Millennium Stadium.
Brentford	Stoke City
0	2
- Date: 11 May 2002
- Venue: Millennium Stadium, Cardiff
- Referee: Graham Laws
- Attendance: 42,523

The 2002 Football League Second Division play-off final was an association football match which was played on 11 May 2002 at the Millennium Stadium, Cardiff, between Brentford and Stoke City. It was to determine the third and final team to gain promotion from the Football League Second Division, the third tier of the English football league system, to the First Division. The top two teams of the 2001–02 Football League Second Division league, Brighton & Hove Albion and Reading, gained automatic promotion to the First Division, while the teams placed from third to sixth place took part in play-offs semi-finals; the winners then competed for the final place for the 2002–03 season in the First Division. Brentford and Stoke City defeated Huddersfield Town and Cardiff City, respectively, in the semi-finals. It was the second season that the play-off finals were contested at the Millennium Stadium during the redevelopment of Wembley Stadium.

The match was refereed by Graham Laws in front of a crowd of 42,523. In the 16th minute Stoke City took the lead from a corner from Arnar Gunnlaugsson, which was flicked on by Chris Iwelumo; Deon Burton struck the ball on the turn from close range, his shot taking a deflection and ending in the Brentford goal. Stoke doubled their lead a minute before half-time, when Gunnlaugsson was fouled just outside Brentford's penalty area and Bjarni Guðjónsson's free kick took a deflection off Ben Burgess and beat Paul Smith in the Brentford goal. In the second half, Stoke goalkeeper Neil Cutler make a number of saves and the match ended 2–0, with Stoke promoted to the First Division.

Brentford finished their following season in 16th place in Second Division, five positions and six points above the relegation zone. Despite gaining promotion, Stoke City sacked their manager Guðjón Þórðarson five days after the final and replaced him with Steve Cotterill, who himself resigned from his position 13 games into the following season. Stoke appointed Tony Pulis as manager and ended the season in 21st place in the First Division, four points above the relegation zone.

This was the last thing to air on the ITV Sport Channel as the channel ceased operations soon after the match.

== Route to the final ==
Football League Second Division final table, leading positions
Pos	Team	Pld	W	D	L	GF	GA	GD	Pts
1	Brighton & Hove Albion	46	25	15	6	66	42	+24	90
2	Reading	46	23	15	8	70	54	+16	84
3	Brentford	46	24	11	11	77	43	+34	83
4	Cardiff City	46	23	14	9	75	50	+25	83
5	Stoke City	46	23	11	12	67	40	+27	80
6	Huddersfield Town	46	21	15	10	65	47	+18	78

Brentford finished the regular 2001–02 season in third place in the Second Division, the third tier of the English football league system, two places and three points ahead of Stoke City. Both therefore missed out on the two automatic places for promotion to the First Division and instead took part in the play-offs to determine the third promoted team. Brentford finished one point behind Reading (who were promoted in second place) and seven behind league winners Brighton & Hove Albion.

Stoke City's opposition for their play-off semi-final were Cardiff City with the first match of the two-legged tie taking place at the Britannia Stadium in Stoke on 28 April 2002. In the twelfth minute, Robert Earnshaw played a one-two with Peter Thorne before shooting from 12 yards (11 metres) to give the visitors the lead. Leo Fortune-West doubled the lead in the 59th minute, scoring with a close-range header after Spencer Prior's attempt rebounded off the Stoke goal-post. The game was then delayed for five minutes as police were needed to quell crowd trouble before Deon Burton scored a half-volley for Stoke with six minutes remaining to make the final score 2–1 to Cardiff. The second leg of the semi-final was held four days later at Ninian Park in Cardiff. In the last minute of regular time, Stoke's James O'Connor scored from a header by Bjarni Guðjónsson—the Stoke manager's son—to level the tie on aggregate and send the match into extra time. With five minutes remaining, O'Connor's free kick was deflected into the Cardiff goal by Souleymane Oularé to give Stoke a 3–2 aggregate victory and progression to the final.

In the second semi-final Brentford faced Huddersfield Town; the first leg was held at the McAlpine Stadium in Huddersfield on 28 April 2002. The home side had two goals ruled out: Andy Booth's effort was disallowed because of a handball and in the second half he was given offside after putting the ball into the Brentford net. Both sides had further chances to score but the game ended goalless. The second leg of the semi-final took place four days later at Griffin Park in Brentford. Two minutes into the match, Booth put Huddersfield ahead with a shot that beat Paul Smith in the Brentford goal. Darren Powell levelled the score in the 37th minute when he headed in a free kick. Just after half-time, Lloyd Owusu scored for Brentford to make it 2–1 and ensure their progression to the final.

== Match ==
=== Background ===
This was Brentford's second appearance in the third-tier play-off finals, having lost the 1997 Football League Second Division play-off final 1–0 against Crewe Alexandra. They had also lost in the semi-finals of the 1991 and 1995 play-offs. Brentford had played in the Second Division since being promoted in the 1998–99 season and had last played in the second tier of English football in the 1992–93 season. Stoke City had participated in the play-offs on four previous occasions, in 1992, 1996, 2000 and 2001 but had failed to progress beyond the semi-final stage. They had last played in the First Division in the 1997–98 season when they were relegated to the third tier. Brentford had won both matches between the sides during the regular season with a 3–2 win at the Britannia Stadium in November 2001 and a 1–0 victory at Griffin Park the following March. Owusu was Brentford's top scorer during the regular season with 21 goals (20 in the league and 1 in the League Cup) followed by Ben Burgess with 18 (17 in the league and 1 in the FA Cup) and Paul Evans with 14 (all in the league). Chris Iwelumo led the scoring for Stoke City with 11 goals (10 in the league and 1 in the FA Cup) followed by Andy Cooke with 10 (9 in the league and 1 in the FA Cup).

According to bookmakers, neither side were clear favourites to win the final. In an attempt to avoid a repetition of the crowd trouble in the play-offs, local police moved the kick-off time to 1:30 p.m. The match was shown live in the United Kingdom on ITV Sport Channel, and was one of the last games broadcast by the channel before it closed down. Stoke had been assigned the south changing room at the Millennium Stadium: the ten previous teams to have used those facilities had lost their match. Prior to this final, artist Andrew Vicari installed a mural painted with the guidance of a feng shui expert in the dressing room. The referee for the match was Graham Laws.

=== Summary ===
The match kicked off around 1:30 p.m. on 11 May 2002 at the Millennium Stadium in Cardiff in front of 42,523 spectators. Within a minute, Burton had made an early run splitting the Brentford defence, but was tackled by Michael Dobson. Burgess had what was Brentford's only chance of the half in the third minute when he struck a shot high over the crossbar from close range. Stoke dominated the first half and took the lead in the 16th minute. A corner from Arnar Gunnlaugsson was flicked on by Iwelumo, Burton struck the ball on the turn from close range, and his shot took a deflection before ending in the Brentford goal. Steve Sidwell's volley from the edge of the Stoke penalty area went over the crossbar before Gunnlaugsson beat Evans and shot over the goal. A minute before half-time, Stoke doubled their lead when Gunnlaugsson was fouled just outside Brentford's penalty area, and Guðjónsson's subsequent free kick took a deflection off Burgess and beat Smith in the Brentford goal. The second half saw Brentford denied by Stoke goalkeeper Neil Cutler on numerous occasions, including weak shots from Lloyd Owusu and Evans. Cutler also made a save late in the second half against Mark McCammon, who had come on in the 70th minute to replace Burgess. The match ended 2–0 and Stoke were promoted to the First Division.

=== Details ===
11 May 2002
13:30

Brentford	0–2	Stoke City
	Report	Burton 16'; Burgess 45' (o.g.)

Millennium Stadium, Cardiff
Attendance: 42,523
Referee: Graham Laws

Brentford	Stoke City

Brentford:
GK	13	Paul Smith
DF	3	Ijah Anderson
DF	4	Ívar Ingimarsson
DF	5	Darren Powell
DF	12	Michael Dobson
MF	7	Paul Evans
MF	11	Martin Rowlands (substituted off) 78'
MF	32	Steve Sidwell
MF	28	Stephen Hunt
FW	30	Ben Burgess (substituted off) 70'
FW	9	Lloyd Owusu
Substitutes:
GK	1	Ólafur Gottskálksson
DF	2	Danny Boxall
MF	20	Kevin O'Connor (substituted on) 78'
MF	23	David Theobald
FW	17	Mark McCammon (substituted on) 70'
Manager:
Steve Coppell

Stoke City:
GK	14	Neil Cutler
DF	3	Clive Clarke
DF	4	Peter Handyside
DF	5	Sergei Shtanyuk
DF	12	Wayne Thomas
MF	7	Bjarni Guðjónsson
MF	17	James O'Connor
MF	29	Tony Dinning (substituted off) 85'
MF	22	Arnar Gunnlaugsson (substituted off) 74'
FW	15	Chris Iwelumo (substituted off) 57'
FW	35	Deon Burton
Substitutes:
GK	33	Jani Viander
DF	36	Ian Brightwell (substituted on) 85'
MF	27	Jurgen Vandeurzen (substituted on) 74'
FW	8	Andy Cooke (substituted on) 57'
FW	9	Souleymane Oularé
Manager:
Guðjón Þórðarson

== Post-match ==
Stoke's victorious manager Guðjón Þórðarson said that he felt sorry for Brentford: "I have sympathy for Steve [Coppell] and his team. We have twice gone close and know how much it hurts." He expressed uncertainty about his future with the club, suggesting that he had not "got a clue what is happening". He said that the consortium who had taken over the club in 1999 "asked for results and I have delivered – and now they have to deliver a proper contract". His counterpart Steve Coppell expressed dismay over his team's defending of set pieces: "We gave away two terrible goals." He also reflected on his own position and that of Brentford: "It is the nature of a football clubs that there are many imponderables in the summer – but particularly at our football club". He left Brentford the following month, claiming the club lacked ambition: "... at Brentford the aim is to survive ... Noades (the Brentford chairman) told me before the end of last season that if I thought the last campaign was tight, the next one will be tighter", and was replaced by first-team coach Wally Downes.

Brentford ended their following season in 16th place in the Second Division, five positions and six points above the relegation zone. Despite gaining promotion, Stoke City sacked Þórðarson five days after the final following a disagreement between him and Stoke's Icelandic ownership consortium, replacing him with Steve Cotterill. Thirteen matches into the following season, Cotterill resigned from his position with the club in 15th place to join Sunderland as assistant manager to Howard Wilkinson whereupon Stoke appointed Tony Pulis as manager. Stoke then went 13 league games without a win and eventually finished in 21st place in the First Division, one place and four points above the relegation zone.
