= Syarhey Shtanyuk =

Belarusian footballer (born 1973)

Sergei Shtanyuk
Personal information
- Full name: Syarhey Pyatrovich Shtanyuk
- Date of birth: 13 August 1973 (age 53)
- Place of birth: Minsk, Byelorussian SSR, USSR
- Height: 1.92 m (6 ft 4 in)
- Position: Defender

Youth career
- SDYuShOR-5 Minsk
- 1990–1991: Quick 1888

Senior career*
Years	Team	Apps	(Gls)
1992–1994	Dinamo-93 Minsk	60	(3)
1994–1995	Dinamo Minsk	24	(1)
1996–2000	Dynamo Moscow	129	(11)
2000	Royal Antwerp	1	(0)
2001–2003	Stoke City	84	(5)
2003–2005	Shinnik Yaroslavl	76	(4)
2005–2006	Metalurh Zaporizhya	13	(0)
2006–2007	Luch-Energia Vladivostok	46	(1)
2008	Rostov	36	(4)
2009	Alania Vladikavkaz	18	(1)
Total		487	(30)

International career
1992–1995	Belarus U21	12	(0)
1995–2007	Belarus	72	(3)
- * Club domestic league appearances and goals

Syarhey Pyatrovich Shtanyuk (Belarusian: Сяргей Пятровіч Штанюк, Russian: Серге́й Петрович Штанюк, tr. Sergey Petrovich Shtanyuk; born 13 August 1973), also known as Sergei Petrovich Shtanyuk, is a Belarusian former professional footballer who played as a defender. He captained the Belarus national side.

== Career ==
Shtaniuk was born in Minsk and played in the Belarusian Premier League for Dynamo-93 and Dynamo Minsk before him and two teammates Pavel Michalevitsj and Aleh Poetsila decided to join Dutch amateur club Quick 1888 based in Nijmegen. He joined Russian club Dynamo Moscow in 1996 where he spent four years, making over 100 appearances. After a short spell with Belgian club Royal Antwerp, he joined English side Stoke City in the summer of 2001. In 2001–02, he played in 48 matches including the 2002 Football League Second Division play-off final where Stoke beat Brentford 2–0 to gain promotion. He played in 47 matches in 2002–03 and won the player of the year award. He left in the summer of 2003 and returned to Russia where he played for Shinnik. He then played in Ukraine for Metalurh Zaporizhya and back in Russia with Luch-Energia Vladivostok, Rostov and Alania Vladikavkaz.

== Career statistics ==
=== Club ===
Appearances and goals by club, season and competition
Club	Season	League			National cup		League cup		Play-offs		Total	
Club	Season	Division	Apps	Goals	Apps	Goals	Apps	Goals	Apps	Goals	Apps	Goals
Dinamo-93 Minsk	1992–93	Belarusian Premier League	30	3							30	3
Dinamo-93 Minsk	1993–94	Belarusian Premier League	30	0							30	0
Dinamo-93 Minsk	Total		60	3							60	3
Dinamo Minsk	1994–95	Belarusian Premier League	13	1							13	1
Dinamo Minsk	1995	Belarusian Premier League	11	0							11	0
Dinamo Minsk	Total		24	1							24	1
Dynamo Moscow	1996	Russian Top League	34	4							34	4
Dynamo Moscow	1997	Russian Top League	34	3							34	3
Dynamo Moscow	1998	Russian Top Division	34	2							34	2
Dynamo Moscow	1999	Russian Top Division	3	0							3	0
Dynamo Moscow	2000	Russian Top Division	24	2							24	2
Dynamo Moscow	Total		129	11							129	11
Royal Antwerp	2000–01	Belgian First Division	1	0							1	0
Stoke City	2001–02	Second Division	40	2	4	0	1	0	3	0	48	2
Stoke City	2002–03	First Division	44	3	2	0	1	0	0	0	47	3
Stoke City	Total		84	5	6	0	2	0	3	0	95	5
Shinnik Yaroslavl	2003	Russian Premier League	15	1							15	1
Shinnik Yaroslavl	2004	Russian Premier League	32	2							32	2
Shinnik Yaroslavl	2005	Russian Premier League	29	1							29	1
Shinnik Yaroslavl	Total		76	4							76	4
Metalurh Zaporizhya	2005–06	Ukrainian Premier League	13	0							13	0
Luch-Energia Vladivostok	2006	Russian Premier League	19	1							19	1
Luch-Energia Vladivostok	2007	Russian Premier League	27	0							27	0
Luch-Energia Vladivostok	Total		46	1							46	1
Rostov	2008	Russian Premier League	36	4							36	4
Alania Vladikavkaz	2009	Russian Premier League	18	1							18	1
Total			487	30	6	0	2	0	3	0	498	30

=== International ===
Appearances and goals by national team and year
National team	Year	Apps	Goals
Belarus	1995	1	0
Belarus	1996	7	1
Belarus	1997	6	0
Belarus	1998	4	0
Belarus	1999	0	0
Belarus	2000	6	0
Belarus	2001	9	0
Belarus	2002	7	0
Belarus	2003	7	1
Belarus	2004	6	0
Belarus	2005	8	0
Belarus	2006	7	1
Belarus	2007	4	0
Total		72	3

Scores and results list Belarus' goal tally first, score column indicates score after each Shtanyuk goal.

List of international goals scored by Syarhey Shtanyuk
No.	Date	Venue	Opponent	Score	Result	Competition
1	14 February 1996	İzmir Atatürk Stadium, İzmir, Turkey	Turkey	2 – 2	2–3	Friendly
2	20 August 2003	Dinamo Stadium, Belarus	Iran	2 – 0	2–1	Friendly
3	2 June 2006	Stade 7 November, Radès, Tunisia	Libya	1 – 0	1–1	LG Cup

== Honours ==
Dinamo Minsk

- Belarusian Premier League: 1994–95, 1995

Stoke City

- Football League Second Division play-offs: 2002

Individual

- Stoke City Player of the Year: 2002–03
