= Lewis Neal =

English footballer

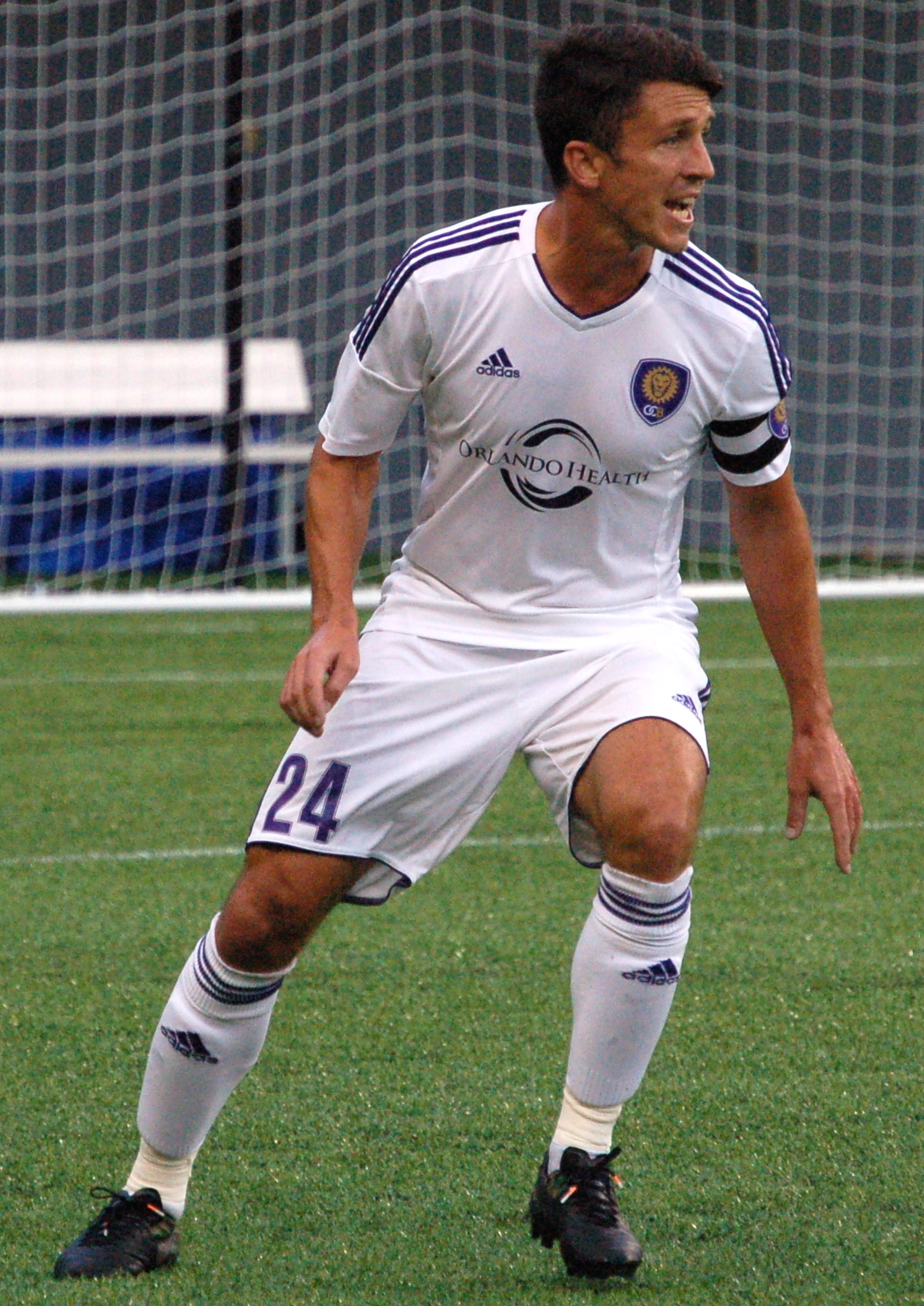
- Neal playing for Orlando City B in 2016

Personal information
- Full name: Lewis Ryan Neal
- Date of birth: 14 July 1981 (age 45)
- Place of birth: Leicester, England
- Height: 1.80 m (5 ft 11 in)
- Position: Midfielder

Youth career
- 1998–2000: Stoke City

Senior career*
Years	Team	Apps	(Gls)
2000–2005	Stoke City	70	(2)
2001	→ ÍBV (loan)	5	(1)
2005–2009	Preston North End	65	(5)
2008	→ Notts County (loan)	4	(0)
2009	Carlisle United	16	(2)
2009–2011	Shrewsbury Town	31	(2)
2011	Orlando City	21	(4)
2012–2014	D.C. United	53	(2)
2015	Orlando City	21	(0)
2016–2017	Orlando City B	49	(5)
2018–2019	Orlando SeaWolves (indoor)	18	(4)

Managerial career
- 2021–2022: Central Florida Panthers (assistant)
- 2022–2023: Miami FC (assistant)
- 2023: Miami FC (interim)
- * Club domestic league appearances and goals

Lewis Ryan Neal (born 14 July 1981) is an English former professional footballer.

== Career ==
Neal started his career at Stoke City, making his debut in the Football League Trophy on 6 December 2000 against Scarborough. He went on loan to Icelandic side Íþróttabandalag Vestmannaeyja before returning to Stoke. He played 70 league games and scored 2 goals for Stoke before signing for Preston North End in 2005 in a player swap deal for Marlon Broomes.

On 31 October 2008, Neal signed a month-long loan deal with Notts County, and made his debut at home to Bury.

After playing 65 league games for Preston, Neal was allowed to join Carlisle United on 30 January 2009, after agreeing to a termination package. He signed a contract to the end of the season. He made his Carlisle debut in the 1–1 home draw against Walsall, but at the end of the season manager Greg Abbott decided to release him.

A day after his contract expired with Carlisle on 2 July 2009, Neal signed a two-year contract with League Two club Shrewsbury Town.

On 22 January 2011, he was released by Shrewsbury Town, by mutual consent. He moved to the United States and entered training camp with Orlando City Soccer Club of the USL Pro league, the third tier of US Soccer. He scored the team's first ever goal on 19 February in a friendly against Philadelphia Union. Lewis signed with Orlando on 21 March 2011.

In early 2012, Neal was on trial with Real Salt Lake of Major League Soccer but was not offered a contract. He signed into the league with D.C. United on 13 March 2012. During his time with D.C., he scored the lone goal in the 2013 U.S. Open Cup final against Real Salt Lake, giving D.C. their third Open Cup title.

After three years with D.C., Neal returned to Florida when he was selected by new franchise Orlando City SC in the 2014 MLS Expansion Draft. He was released by Orlando at the end of the 2015 season. On 17 December, Orlando City confirmed that Neal had been resigned on a two-year deal giving him an extended role with the organization including an academy coaching role, a playing position on the Orlando City B team and media duties.

Neal continued his professional career by signing with the Orlando SeaWolves in May 2018, ahead of their inaugural Major Arena Soccer League season.

In March 2021, Neal rejoined former SeaWolves coach Tom Traxler by joining the coaching staff of Central Florida Panthers SC of the National Premier Soccer League

In June 2023, Anthony Pulis left his position as head coach of USL Championship side Miami FC, and Neal took over as interim head coach. Neal left the club following the 2023 season.

== Personal life ==
Neal earned his US green card in February 2013. This status qualifies him as a domestic player for MLS roster purposes.

== Career statistics ==
As of match played 24 November 2019

Appearances and goals by club, season and competition
Club	Season	League			Cup		League Cup		Other^{[A]}		Total	
Club	Season	Division	Apps	Goals	Apps	Goals	Apps	Goals	Apps	Goals	Apps	Goals
Stoke City	2000–01	Second Division	1	0	0	0	0	0	2	0	3	0
Stoke City	2001–02	Second Division	11	0	2	0	0	0	1	1	14	1
Stoke City	2002–03	First Division	16	0	3	0	0	0	–		19	0
Stoke City	2003–04	First Division	19	1	1	0	2	0	–		22	1
Stoke City	2004–05	Championship	23	1	0	0	1	0	–		24	1
Stoke City	Total		70	2	6	0	3	0	3	1	82	3
ÍBV (loan)	2001	Úrvalsdeild	5	1	0	0	0	0	–		5	1
Preston North End	2005–06	Championship	24	2	4	0	1	0	–		29	2
Preston North End	2006–07	Championship	24	1	2	0	0	0	–		26	1
Preston North End	2007–08	Championship	17	2	1	0	0	0	–		18	2
Preston North End	Total		70	6	7	0	1	0	0	0	78	6
Notts County (loan)	2008–09	League Two	4	0	2	0	0	0	0	0	6	0
Carlisle United	2008–09	League One	16	1	0	0	0	0	0	0	16	1
Shrewsbury Town	2009–10	League Two	29	2	1	0	0	0	1	0	31	2
Shrewsbury Town	2010–11	League Two	2	0	0	0	1	0	2	0	5	0
Shrewsbury Town	Total		51	3	3	0	1	0	3	0	58	3
Orlando City	2011	USL Pro	21	4	1	0	0	0	0	0	22	4
D.C. United	2012	Major League Soccer	22	2	2	0	0	0	0	0	24	2
D.C. United	2013	Major League Soccer	9	0	1	0	0	0	3	1	12	1
D.C. United	2014	Major League Soccer	27	0	1	0	0	0	3	0	31	0
D.C. United	Total		79	6	5	0	0	0	6	1	90	7
Orlando City	2015	Major League Soccer	21	0	1	1	0	0	0	0	22	1
Orlando City B	2016	USL Championship	25	2	0	0	0	0	0	0	25	2
Orlando City B	2017	USL Championship	24	3	0	0	0	0	0	0	25	3
Orlando SeaWolves	2018	Major Arena Soccer League	15	4	0	0	0	0	0	0	15	4
Orlando SeaWolves	2019	Major Arena Soccer League	2	0	0	0	0	0	0	0	2	0
Career Total			357	27	22	1	5	0	12	2	396	29

A. The "Other" column constitutes appearances and goals in the Football League play-offs, Football League Trophy and CONCACAF Champions League.

== Honours ==
Orlando City

- USL Pro: 2011

D.C. United

- Lamar Hunt U.S. Open Cup: 2013
