= James O'Connor (footballer, born 1979) =

Irish footballer (born 1979)

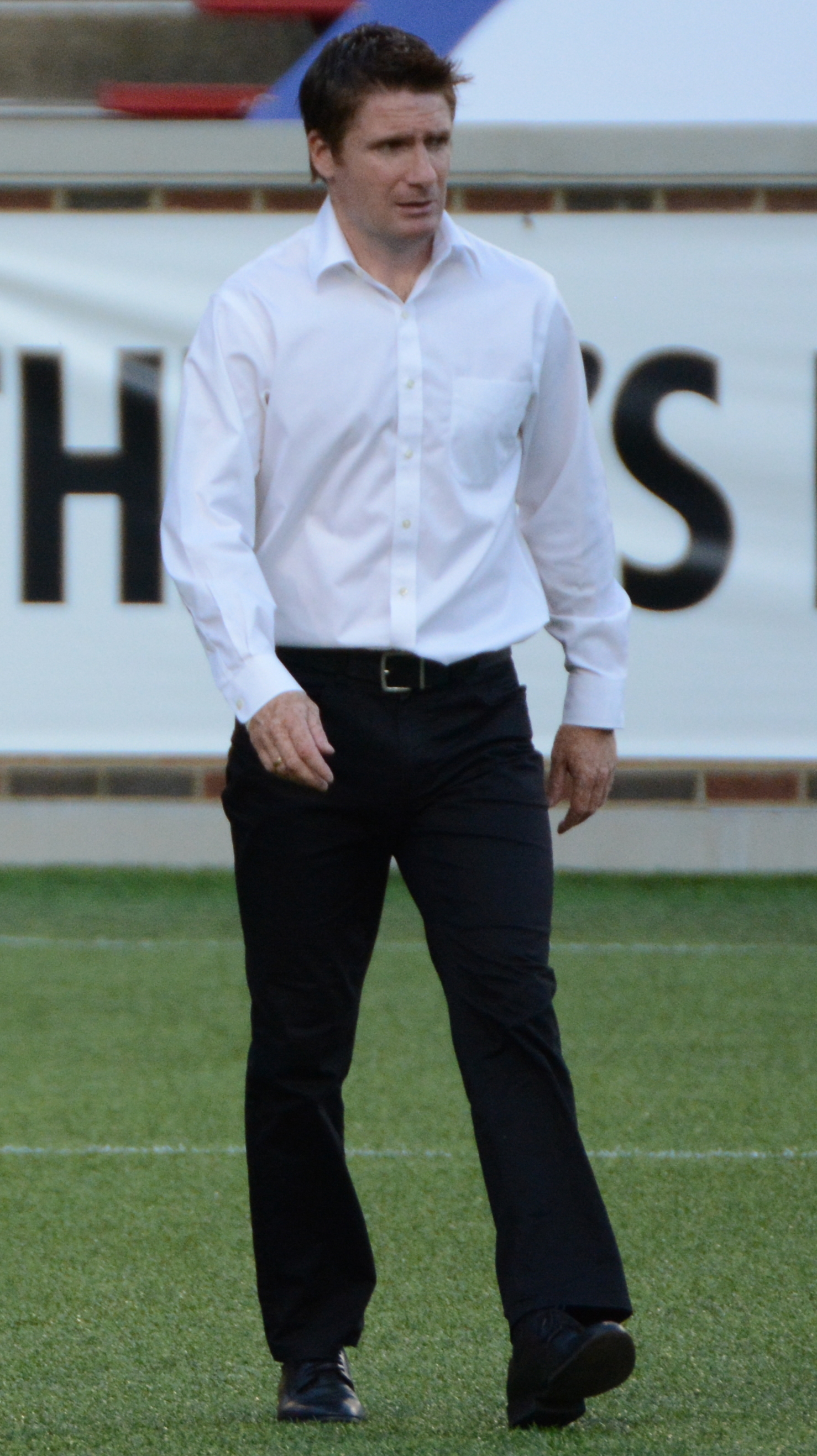
- O'Connor coaching Louisville City in 2017

Personal information
- Full name: James Kevin Matthew O'Connor
- Date of birth: 1 September 1979 (age 47)
- Place of birth: Bray, Ireland
- Height: 5 ft 8 in (1.73 m)
- Position: Midfielder

Youth career
- 1994–1996: Stoke City

Senior career*
Years	Team	Apps	(Gls)
1996–2003	Stoke City	176	(16)
2003–2005	West Bromwich Albion	30	(0)
2004–2005	→ Burnley (loan)	13	(0)
2005–2008	Burnley	126	(11)
2008–2011	Sheffield Wednesday	139	(6)
2012–2014	Orlando City	41	(0)
Total		525	(33)

International career
- Republic of Ireland U21

Managerial career
- 2013–2014: Orlando City (assistant)
- 2015–2018: Louisville City
- 2018–2019: Orlando City
- * Club domestic league appearances and goals

James Kevin Matthew O'Connor (born 1 September 1979) is an Irish former professional footballer who is the President of Soccer Holdings, which is the holding company of USL Louisville City Football Club and NWSL Racing Louisville. He oversees all of the Soccer Holdings operations including all business aspects and soccer operations.

O'Connor began his career with Stoke City and after progressing their youth team he helped them to victory in the 2000 Football League Trophy Final and 2002 Football League Second Division play-off final. After making over 200 appearances for the Potters, he left to join Midlands rivals West Bromwich Albion in the summer of 2003. He spent one season at The Hawthorns before moving on to Burnley. O'Connor became a regular at Turf Moor making 149 appearances in four seasons at the club. In June 2008 he joined Sheffield Wednesday where he had spent four years making over 150 appearances. In January 2012 he moved to the United States to play for Orlando City. At international level, he played for the Republic of Ireland Under-21s.

He retired from playing in the summer of 2014 to become head coach of Louisville City.

== Club career ==
O'Connor was born in Bray and joined English club Stoke City in 1996 after being spotted by the club's Irish base scouts. He made his debut in the 1998–99 season before becoming a regular in the team in 1999–2000. He scored eight goals in 55 appearances as Stoke reached the play-offs where they lost to Gillingham although he did play in the 2000 Football League Trophy Final where Stoke beat Bristol City 2–1 and his performances during the season earn him the player of the year award. He played 54 times in 2000–01 for Stoke scoring ten goals as they again failed in the play-offs losing to Walsall. He played in 50 matches in 2001–02 as Stoke finally won promotion via the play-offs, beating Brentford 2–0 in the 2002 Football League Second Division play-off final. He played 47 times in 2002–03 helping Stoke avoid relegation before he turned down the offer of a new contract.

He moved to West Bromwich Albion in summer 2003 for a fee of £250,000 and made his debut in the 4–1 defeat to Walsall. He spent a successful three-month loan spell with Burnley in 2004–05. That season he made only two substitute appearances for West Bromwich Albion and moved to Burnley permanently to pursue first-team football, signing on transfer deadline day in 2005 for a £175,000 fee where he became a popular player with the fans.

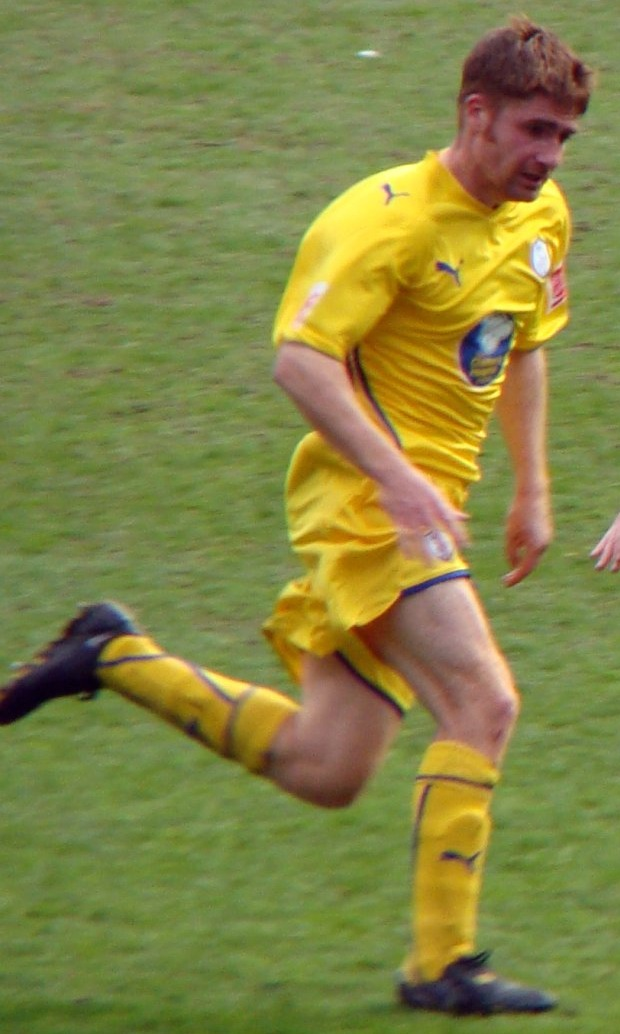
O'Connor playing for Sheffield Wednesday in 2009

His form at the start of the 2006–07 season at Burnley was among the best of his career. However, by the start of the 2007–08 season he seemed to be relegated to a squad player's role. The departure of Steve Cotterill as Burnley manager brought Owen Coyle in and he immediately restored O'Connor to the starting eleven. O'Connor responded by resuming his previous good form as the team's results improved. He was offered a new contract at the end of the 2007–08 season but when O'Connor asked for more time to consider his options, Coyle withdrew the offer and released him. O'Connor confirmed in an interview on BBC Radio Lancashire on 23 May that he was about to start a coaching course before deciding on his future.

O'Connor confirmed his move to Championship side Sheffield Wednesday on 27 June 2008 following a month of speculation surrounding the move in the press. He joined the club on a free transfer under the Bosman ruling after turning down the offer to extend his stay at Turf Moor.

== International career ==
O'Connor played for the Ireland at Under-21 level.

== Coaching career ==
On 10 January 2012, O'Connor signed with American third-tier side Orlando City of USL Pro. He became a player-coach in 2013 with the team. He then became manager of Louisville City (Orlando City sold their rights to a USL Pro team to an investor group in Louisville, Kentucky). In March 2017, O'Connor extended his contract with Louisville City through the 2020 season.

On 29 June 2018, Louisville City announced that O'Connor would depart the club after its match against New York Red Bulls II the next day to become head coach of Orlando City SC in MLS, replacing Jason Kreis, who was sacked two weeks earlier. A trio of players – George Davis IV, Paolo DelPiccolo and Luke Spencer – would serve as player-coaches on an interim basis until a replacement was announced. He was sacked at the end of the 2019 season with the team having missed out on playoffs again and remaining 11th in the Eastern Conference.

== Personal life ==
O'Connor's two brothers, Danny and Kevin both played for Bray Wanderers.

== Career statistics ==
Appearances and goals by club, season and competition
Club	Season	League			National cup		League cup		Other		Total	
Club	Season	Division	Apps	Goals	Apps	Goals	Apps	Goals	Apps	Goals	Apps	Goals
Stoke City	1998–99	Second Division	4	0	0	0	0	0	1 (Note: Appearances in Football League Trophy)	0	5	0
Stoke City	1999–2000	Second Division	42	5	1	0	3	1	9 (Note: Seven Appearances and two goals in Football League Trophy and two appearances in Second Division play-offs)	2	55	8
Stoke City	2000–01	Second Division	44	8	1	0	5	2	4 (Note: Two Appearances in Football League Trophy and two appearances in Second Division play-offs)	0	54	10
Stoke City	2001–02	Second Division	43	2	4	0	0	0	3 (Note: Appearances in Second Division play-offs)	1	50	3
Stoke City	2002–03	First Division	43	0	3	0	1	0	—		47	0
Stoke City	Total		176	16	9	0	9	2	17	4	211	22
West Bromwich Albion	2003–04	First Division	30	0	1	0	5	0	—		36	0
West Bromwich Albion	2004–05	Premier League	0	0	1	0	1	0	—		2	0
West Bromwich Albion	Total		30	0	2	0	6	0	—		38	0
Burnley	2004–05	Championship	21	2	1	0	1	0	—		23	2
Burnley	2005–06	Championship	45	3	1	0	3	0	—		49	3
Burnley	2006–07	Championship	42	3	1	0	1	0	—		44	3
Burnley	2007–08	Championship	29	3	1	0	3	0	—		33	3
Burnley	Total		137	11	4	0	8	0	—		49	11
Sheffield Wednesday	2008–09	Championship	41	0	1	0	1	0	—		43	0
Sheffield Wednesday	2009–10	Championship	44	3	1	0	1	0	—		46	3
Sheffield Wednesday	2010–11	League One	36	2	4	0	2	0	3	2	45	4
Sheffield Wednesday	2011–12	League One	18	1	1	0	2	0	1	0	22	1
Sheffield Wednesday	Total		139	6	7	0	6	0	4	2	156	8
Orlando City	2012	USL Pro	21	0	1	0	0	0	0	0	22	0
Orlando City	2013	USL Pro	19	0	3	0	0	0	3 (Note: Appearances in USL Pro Playoffs)	0	25	0
Orlando City	2014	USL Pro	1	0	0	0	0	0	0	0	1	0
Orlando City	Total		41	0	4	0	0	0	3	0	48	0
Career total			523	33	26	0	29	2	24	6	602	41

== Managerial statistics ==
All competitive games (league and domestic cups) are included.

As of 7 October 2019

Managerial record by team and tenure
Team	From	To	Record							
Team	From	To	P	W	D	L	GF	GA	GD	Win %
Louisville City	4 June 2014	30 June 2018	125	71	28	26	225	119	+106	56.80
Orlando City	2 July 2018	7 October 2019	56	13	14	29	69	95	−26	23.21
Career total			181	84	42	55	294	214	+80	46.41

== Honours ==
Stoke City

- Football League Second Division play-offs: 2002
- Football League Trophy: 1999–2000

Orlando City

- USL Pro Championship: 2013

Louisville City FC

- USL Championship: 2017

Individual

- Stoke Player of the Year: 1999–2000
