= 2002–03 Stoke City F.C. season =

Stoke City
2002–03 season
- Chairman: Gunnar Gíslason
- Manager: Steve Cotterill, Dave Kevan, Tony Pulis
- Stadium: Britannia Stadium
- Football League First Division: 21st (50 Points)
- FA Cup: Fifth Round
- League Cup: First Round
- Top goalscorer: League: Andy Cooke (6); All: Chris Iwelumo (7)
- Highest home attendance: 21,023 vs Brighton & Hove Albion (5 March 2003)
- Lowest home attendance: 10,406 vs Walsall (26 February 2003)
- Average home league attendance: 14,532
Home colours

The 2002–03 season was Stoke City's 96th season in the Football League and the 36th in the second tier.

Stoke now back in the First Division appointed young manager Steve Cotterill prior to the start of the season. Cotterill had got an impressive reputation following his success with Cheltenham Town but after just 13 matches in charge he shocked the club by quitting in favour of becoming assistant manager at Sunderland. Dave Kevan took over as caretaker until Tony Pulis was appointed in November. His task was to ensure Stoke survived which looked a tough ask as Stoke went 16 matches without a win and when Stoke did manage to get a positive result they lost 6–0 at Nottingham Forest. Following that defeat Pulis improved his defence and results were slowly being ground out and it went to the final day of the season against Reading, with Stoke knowing that if they win they will stay up and thanks to Ade Akinbiyi they won 1–0 and finished four points above the relegation zone.

== Season review ==
=== League ===
With Gudjon Thordarson failing to gain a new contract the Stoke board moved to appoint Steve Cotterill from Cheltenham Town. Cotterill was seen as one of the best young managers in the country and it was hoped that he would be a long term appointment. He brought in Chris Greenacre a striker from Mansfield Town where he had been a prolific goalscorer. The season started with a 0–0 draw away at Sheffield Wednesday and their first win came at home to Bradford City. This was followed by a 4–3 defeat at Preston North End and defeats by Derby and Burnley. Stoke then went five matches unbeaten to lift them away from danger but the club was shocked on 10 October 2002 as Cotterill quit the club in favour of becoming assistant manager at Sunderland.

Dave Kevan assumed a caretaker manager role and in his four matches in charge Stoke lost them all to start a worrying run of results. The board had expected to appoint George Burley as manager but somewhat surprisingly Tony Pulis was the man given the job. Pulis had previously turned down the chance to manage the club in 1999 and his appointment was not a popular one with the supporters. In his first match in charge away at Walsall he received a less than warm welcome and Stoke crashed to a 4–2 defeat. It took Pulis' team nine more matches to register a victory and after it looked as though Stoke could start pulling away from relegation they suffered humiliation by losing 6–0 at Nottingham Forest and the survival bid looked grim.

But Pulis signed a number of players on loan which included Ade Akinbiyi, Paul Warhurst, Lee Mills, and goalkeepers Steve Banks and Mark Crossley. Pulis made Stoke a difficult team to beat and after three hard-fought goalless draws against teams trying to gain promotion Stoke gained vital victories against Watford, Rotherham United, Wimbledon and Coventry City. This took the relegation fight to the last day of the season with Stoke needing a victory against Reading to ensure their stay in First Division would be extended. A 55th-minute strike from Ade Akinbiyi sealed the win they needed and Stoke could start building for the future.

=== FA Cup ===
Two 3–0 wins against Wigan Athletic and Bournemouth set up a tie against Premier League Chelsea and two second half goals gave the Londoners a 2–0 victory.

=== League Cup ===
Stoke lost in the first round to Bury 1–0 at Gigg Lane.

== Final league table ==
Pos	Team	Pld	W	D	L	GF	GA	GD	Pts	Promotion or relegation
19	Bradford City	46	14	10	22	51	73	−22	52	
20	Coventry City	46	12	14	20	46	62	−16	50	
21	Stoke City	46	12	14	20	45	69	−24	50	
22	Sheffield Wednesday (R)	46	10	16	20	56	73	−17	46	Relegation to 2003–04 Second Division
23	Brighton & Hove Albion (R)	46	11	12	23	49	67	−18	45	Relegation to 2003–04 Second Division

Updated to match(es) played on 11 May 2003. Source: Soccerway
Rules for classification: 1) points; 2) goal difference; 3) number of goals scored.
(R) Relegated

== Results ==
Stoke's score comes first

=== Legend ===
Win	Draw	Loss

=== Pre-season friendlies ===
Match	Date	Opponent	Venue	Result	Attendance	Scorers
1	14 July 2002	Newcastle Town	A	7–1	3,379	Winters, Goodfellow (2), Greenacre (3), Neal
2	22 July 2002	Wacker Burghausen	A	0–2		
3	26 July 2002	Sturm Graz	A	1–1		Handyside
4	31 July 2002	West Bromwich Albion	H	0–0	6,241	
5	3 August 2002	Birmingham City	H	0–2	5,781	

=== Football League First Division ===
Match	Date	Opponent	Venue	Result	Attendance	Scorers	Reports
1	10 August 2002	Sheffield Wednesday	A	0–0	26,746		Report
2	14 August 2002	Leicester City	H	0–1	14,028		Report
3	17 August 2002	Bradford City	H	2–1	12,424	Cooke 4', Marteinsson 34'	Report
4	24 August 2002	Preston North End	A	3–4	15,422	Clarke (2) 7', 65' (2 pens), Cooke 90+2'	Report
5	26 August 2002	Norwich City	H	1–1	13,931	Commons 74'	Report
6	31 August 2002	Derby County	A	0–2	21,723		Report
7	14 September 2002	Burnley	A	1–2	14,244	Guðjónsson 74'	Report
8	17 September 2002	Brighton & Hove Albion	A	2–1	6,369	Mooney 17' (pen), Cooke 90'	Report
9	21 September 2002	Ipswich Town	H	2–1	14,587	Shtanyuk 17', Cooke 80'	Report
10	25 September 2002	Nottingham Forest	H	2–2	14,554	Shtanyuk 13', Goodfellow 72'	Report
11	28 September 2002	Reading	A	1–1	13,646	Vandeurzen 39'	Report
12	5 October 2002	Crystal Palace	H	1–1	14,214	Iwelumo 85'	Report
13	19 October 2002	Wolverhampton Wanderers	H	0–2	16,885		Report
14	23 October 2002	Sheffield United	A	1–2	15,163	Greenacre 84'	Report
15	26 October 2002	Rotherham United	A	0–4	7,078		Report
16	30 October 2002	Watford	H	1–2	11,215	Mooney 72'	Report
17	2 November 2002	Walsall	A	2–4	6,391	Cooke (2) 77', 81'	Report
18	9 November 2002	Grimsby Town	H	1–2	11,488	Mooney 50' (pen)	Report
19	16 November 2002	Portsmouth	A	0–3	18,701		Report
20	23 November 2002	Millwall	H	0–1	13,776		Report
21	30 November 2002	Gillingham	A	1–1	8,150	Clarke 56'	Report
22	7 December 2002	Coventry City	H	1–2	12,760	Hoekstra 35'	Report
23	14 December 2002	Portsmouth	H	1–1	13,330	Gunnarsson 34'	Report
24	21 December 2002	Wimbledon	A	1–1	1,697	Iwelumo 88'	Report
25	26 December 2002	Bradford City	A	2–4	14,575	Marteinsson 9', Henry 23'	Report
26	28 December 2002	Sheffield Wednesday	H	3–2	16,042	Iwelumo (2) 16', 66', Gunnarsson 90+4'	Report
27	1 January 2003	Preston North End	H	2–1	14,862	Gunnarsson 43', Hoekstra 45'	Report
28	11 January 2003	Leicester City	A	0–0	25,058		Report
29	18 January 2003	Derby County	H	1–3	17,308	Greenacre 63'	Report
30	1 February 2003	Norwich City	A	2–2	20,186	Gunnarsson 63', Mills 88'	Report
31	8 February 2003	Grimsby Town	A	0–2	5,657		Report
32	22 February 2003	Nottingham Forest	A	0–6	24,085		Report
33	26 February 2003	Walsall	H	1–0	10,409	Mills 19'	Report
34	1 March 2003	Burnley	H	0–1	12,874		Report
35	5 March 2003	Brighton & Hove Albion	H	1–0	21,023	Greenacre 83'	Report
36	8 March 2003	Ipswich Town	A	0–0	24,547		Report
37	15 March 2003	Sheffield United	H	0–0	14,449		Report
38	18 March 2003	Wolverhampton Wanderers	A	0–0	25,235		Report
39	22 March 2003	Watford	A	2–1	12,570	Hoekstra (2) 34' 49', (1 pen)	Report
40	5 April 2003	Gillingham	H	0–0	12,746		Report
41	9 April 2003	Rotherham United	H	2–0	19,553	Warhurst 21', Cooke 40'	Report
42	12 April 2003	Millwall	A	1–3	8,725	Shtanyuk 73'	Report
43	19 April 2003	Wimbledon	H	2–1	12,587	Gunnarsson 29', Akinbiyi 45'	Report
44	21 April 2003	Coventry City	A	1–0	12,675	Montgomery 87' (o.g.)	Report
45	26 April 2003	Crystal Palace	A	0–1	16,604		Report
46	4 May 2003	Reading	H	1–0	20,477	Akinbiyi 55'	Report

=== FA Cup ===
Round	Date	Opponent	Venue	Result	Attendance	Scorers	Report
R3	4 January 2003	Wigan Athletic	H	3–0	9,618	Greenacre (2) 20', 67' Iwelumo 31'	Report
R4	25 January 2003	Bournemouth	H	3–0	12,004	Iwelumo (2) 45', 51' (1 pen), Hoekstra 84'	Report
R5	16 February 2003	Chelsea	H	0–2	26,615		Report

=== League Cup ===
Round	Date	Opponent	Venue	Result	Attendance	Scorers	Report
R1	10 September 2002	Bury	A	0–1	2,581		Report

== Squad statistics ==
No.	Pos.	Name	League		FA Cup		League Cup		Total		Discipline	
No.	Pos.	Name	Apps	Goals	Apps	Goals	Apps	Goals	Apps	Goals	Yellow card	Red card
1	GK	(England) Neil Cutler	20	0	1(1)	0	1	0	22(1)	0	0	0
2	DF	(England) Wayne Thomas	41	0	3	0	1	0	45	0	6	1
3	DF	(Republic of Ireland) Clive Clarke	27(4)	3	0	0	1	0	28(4)	3	5	0
4	DF	(Scotland) Peter Handyside	44	0	2	0	1	0	47	0	3	1
5	DF	(Belarus) Sergei Shtanuk	44	3	2	0	1	0	47	3	8	1
6	MF	(Iceland) Brynjar Gunnarsson	40	5	3	0	1	0	44	5	10	2
7	MF	(Iceland) Bjarni Guðjónsson	25(11)	1	2(1)	0	1	0	28(12)	1	2	0
8	FW	(England) Andy Cooke	24(7)	6	0	0	1	0	25(7)	6	4	0
9	FW	(England) Lee Mills	7(4)	2	0	0	0	0	7(4)	2	0	0
10	FW	(England) Chris Greenacre	18(12)	4	3	2	0	0	21(12)	6	1	0
11	MF	(Netherlands) Peter Hoekstra	26(4)	4	2	1	0(1)	0	28(5)	5	6	0
12	GK	(Finland) Jani Viander	0	0	0	0	0	0	0	0	0	0
14	GK	(England) Ben Foster	0	0	0	0	0	0	0	0	0	0
15	FW	(Scotland) Chris Iwelumo	15(17)	4	3	3	1	0	19(17)	7	4	0
16	FW	(England) Tommy Mooney	11(1)	3	0	0	0	0	11(1)	3	0	1
16	DF	(England) Frazer Richardson	7	0	0	0	0	0	7	0	0	0
17	MF	(Republic of Ireland) James O'Connor	43	0	3	0	1	0	47	0	12	0
18	MF	(England) Lewis Neal	7(9)	0	1(2)	0	0	0	8(11)	0	2	0
19	FW	(England) Marc Goodfellow	6(14)	1	0(3)	0	0(1)	0	6(18)	1	0	0
20	MF	(England) Mark Wilson	4	0	0	0	0	0	4	0	0	0
21	MF	(Iceland) Pétur Marteinsson	7(5)	2	1(1)	0	0	0	8(6)	2	3	1
22	MF	(England) Brian Wilson	1(2)	0	0	0	0	0	1(2)	0	0	0
23	MF	(England) Karl Henry	15(3)	1	2(1)	0	0(1)	0	17(5)	1	1	0
24	MF	(Scotland) Kris Commons	6(2)	1	0	0	1	0	9	1	0	0
25	DF	(Wales) Gareth Owen	0	0	0	0	0	0	0	0	0	0
26	FW	(Nigeria) Ade Akinbiyi	4	2	0	0	0	0	4	2	0	0
27	MF	(Belgium) Jurgen Vandeurzen	7(5)	1	0	0	0	0	7(5)	1	0	0
27	FW	(England) Paul Warhurst	4(1)	1	0	0	0	0	4(1)	1	1	0
28	GK	(Wales) Mark Crossley	12	0	0	0	0	0	12	0	2	0
29	DF	(Republic of Ireland) Richard Keogh	0	0	0	0	0	0	0	0	0	0
30	DF	(England) Marcus Hall	23(1)	0	3	0	0	0	26(1)	0	3	0
31	GK	(England) Steve Banks	14	0	2	0	0	0	16	0	0	0
32	DF	(Northern Ireland) Mark Williams	5(1)	0	0	0	0	0	5(1)	0	1	0
33	FW	(England) Laurence Hall	0	0	0	0	0	0	0	0	0	0
–	–	Own goals	–	1	–	0	–	0	–	1	–	–
