= Robert Heath (footballer) =

English footballer

Personal information
- Full name: Robert Heath
- Date of birth: 21 August 1980 (age 46)
- Place of birth: Newcastle-under-Lyme, England
- Position: Midfielder

Senior career*
Years	Team	Apps	(Gls)
1997–2001	Stoke City	19	(0)
2001–2002	Stafford Rangers		
- * Club domestic league appearances and goals

Robert Heath (born 31 August 1978) is an English former footballer who played in the Football League for Stoke City.

== Career ==
Heath was born in Newcastle-under-Lyme and began his career with local side Stoke City. He broke into the first team towards the end of the 1997–98 season with Stoke heading for relegation to the third tier. He played twelve times under Brian Little in 1998–99 but struggled to force his way into the side with both Gary Megson and Icelandic Guðjón Þórðarson bringing their own choice of players in 1999–2000 restricting Heath to just five appearances. He played just once in 2000–01 where he scored in a 5–1 victory over York City in the League Cup. He spent the remainder of the season in the reserves and was released in May 2001. He then went on to play for non-league Stafford Rangers.

== Career statistics ==
Appearances and goals by club, season and competition
Club	Season	Division	League		FA Cup		League Cup		Other		Total	
Club	Season	Division	Apps	Goals	Apps	Goals	Apps	Goals	Apps	Goals	Apps	Goals
Stoke City	1997–98	First Division	6	0	0	0	0	0	—		6	0
Stoke City	1998–99	Second Division	10	0	0	0	0	0	2 (Note: Appearances in Football League Trophy)	0	12	0
Stoke City	1999–2000	Second Division	3	0	1	0	1	0	0	0	5	0
Stoke City	2000–01	Second Division	0	0	0	0	1	1	0	0	1	1
Career total			19	0	1	0	2	1	2	0	24	1
