= Söderköping Process =

Cross-border cooperation initiative between 10 eastern European nations

Söderköping Process / Cross-Border Co-operation Process (CBCP) is an initiative launched in 2001 to coordinate the cross-border cooperation issues of asylum, migration, and border management for the countries by the Eastern border of the European Union (Söderköping countries): Belarus (2001), Estonia (observer, as of 2007), Hungary (2003), Latvia (2002), Lithuania (2001), Moldova (2002), Poland (2001), Romania (2003), Slovakia (2003), and Ukraine (2001). It is named after Söderköping, Sweden, where the first meeting took place on the initiative of the United Nations High Commissioner for Refugees (UNHCR) and the Swedish Migration Board.

The process is financed by the EU and implemented by the UNHCR. The International Organization for Migration and the Swedish Migration Board are the partners of the Process.

The Söderköping countries are divided into two working clusters:

- Northern cluster: Belarus, Estonia, Latvia, Lithuania, Poland, and Ukraine;
- Central and Southern cluster: Hungary, Moldova, Romania, Slovakia, and Ukraine.

As of 2007 there is no centralized governing body, all issued are handled at annual senior meetings and at working meetings of clusters.

The infrastructure support (discussion forum, expert advice, information services, etc.) is provided by the CBCP Secretariat.
