= 2000–01 Stoke City F.C. season =

Stoke City
2000–01 season
- Chairman: Gunnar Gíslason
- Manager: Gudjon Thordarson
- Stadium: Britannia Stadium
- Football League Second Division: 5th (77 Points)
- Play-offs: Semi-final
- FA Cup: First Round
- League Cup: Fourth Round
- League Trophy: Semi final
- Top goalscorer: League: Peter Thorne (16); All: Peter Thorne (19)
- Highest home attendance: 22,133 vs Port Vale (17 February 2001)
- Lowest home attendance: 9,350 vs Brentford (17 January 2001)
- Average home league attendance: 13,767
Home colours

The 2000–01 season was Stoke City's 94th season in the Football League and the seventh in the third tier.

Manager Gudjon Thordarson again brought in some of his fellow countrymen as Stoke were looking to gain promotion to the First Division. The close season saw Stoke beat higher placed teams in the form of Birmingham City and Liverpool but a goalless draw with Wycombe Wanderers emphasized that pre-season results mean nothing. Stoke's form was steady if not spectacular but two terrible cup exists, defeat to Nuneaton Borough in the FA Cup and a shocking 8–0 loss at home to Liverpool in the League Cup threatened to derail Stoke's season. But Stoke responded by going 12 matches unbeaten and for the second season running Stoke entered the lottery of the play-offs. Walsall were the opponents and after a 0–0 draw the "Saddlers" proved to be too strong at the Bescot Stadium and won the match 4–2 leaving Stoke facing a fourth season in the third tier.

== Season review ==
=== League ===
The Icelandic invasion of Stoke-on-Trent was now in full flow with no less than ten Scandinavian players agreeing to join the club. Amongst them were club record signing Brynjar Gunnarsson, the manager's son Bjarni Guðjónsson, Swedish full-back Mikael Hansson and new forwards Stefán Þórðarson and Ríkharður Daðason although Daðason took until October before he could complete his move from Norwegian football. Stoke went on a pre-season tour of Iceland and then had two impressive results against Birmingham City and Liverpool. Tony Dorigo and Wayne Thomas both joined the side before the season opener at home to Wycombe Wanderers with excitement rife after the good pre-season. But a frustrating 0–0 followed and those it seemed that pre-season results are pretty pointless.

Stoke soon started to get their act together and began to find the back of the net regularly with Peterborough United beaten 3–0 and Oxford United 4–0 and a 3–3 draw away at Reading. The first Potteries derby ended 1–1 but in the next match against Rotherham United on-loan striker Marvin Robinson broke his leg in a collision with the Rotherham goalkeeper. A last minute victory over Millwall was an important win against a promotion rival and with the arrival of Dadason it seemed that Stoke could continue their push for an automatic position but two defeats in the FA and League Cup saw the feeling around the club drop and after a 3–1 defeat at home to bottom of the table Luton Town there was a major danger that those results could affect their league form. But City bounced back and went on a 13 match unbeaten run cementing their place in the play-offs.

But Stoke not making life easy for themselves lost to several lowly placed sides increasing the risk of being caught but three wins at the end of the season saw Stoke finish in 5th position with 77 points and they come up against an impressive Walsall side. The first leg at the Britannia was a tense affair which saw Ben Petty 'sacrifice' himself to prevent a goal for Walsall and the match ended 0–0. The second leg started well enough for Stoke with Graham Kavanagh putting City into the lead but a goalkeeping howler from Gavin Ward gifted the "Saddlers" an equaliser. In a mad 15 minute spell in the second half Walsall scored three without reply and despite Peter Thorne scoring it was too little to late and Stoke would have to try again to gain that promotion out of the third tier.

=== FA Cup ===
Stoke were on the receiving end of a cup shock against non-league side Nuneaton Borough. They drew the first tie 0-0, and in the replay Marc McGregor scored a late goal for Nuneaton to secure a 1-0 victory.

=== League Cup ===
Stoke had a decent run to the fourth round after beating York City 5–1, Premier League Charlton Athletic on away goals after a thrilling 5–5 aggregate score and a 3–2 over Barnsley saw Stoke earn a glamour tie against Liverpool. But it quickly turned into a nightmare for Stoke as Liverpool ran riot scoring with every shot they took and ended up with an 8–0 victory, Stoke's worst home defeat.

=== League Trophy ===
As holders Stoke were looking to retain the Football League Trophy and they made it to the northern section semi final against local rivals Port Vale after beating Scarborough (3–1), Halifax Town (3–2) and Walsall (4–0). The tie was originally scheduled to be played at Vale Park but with several failed attempts to play the match due to a waterlogged pitch the match was moved to the Britannia Stadium. Vale won a dour match 2–1 after extra time and they went on to lift the trophy.

== Final league table ==
Pos	Team	Pld	W	D	L	GF	GA	GD	Pts	Qualification or relegation
3	Reading	46	25	11	10	86	52	+34	86	Qualification for the Second Division play-offs
4	Walsall (O, P)	46	23	12	11	79	50	+29	81	Qualification for the Second Division play-offs
5	Stoke City	46	21	14	11	74	49	+25	77	Qualification for the Second Division play-offs
6	Wigan Athletic	46	19	18	9	53	42	+11	75	Qualification for the Second Division play-offs
7	Bournemouth	46	20	13	13	79	55	+24	73	

Rules for classification: 1) Points; 2) Goal difference; 3) Goals scored
(O) Play-off winners; (P) Promoted

== Results ==
Stoke's score comes first

=== Legend ===
Win	Draw	Loss

=== Pre-season friendlies ===
Match	Date	Opponent	Venue	Result	Attendance	Scorers
1	14 July 2000	ÍA Akranes	A	1–1		Lightbourne
2	16 July 2000	KA Akureyri	A	1–1		Þórðarson
3	17 July 2000	Víkingur	A	2–2		O'Connor, Guðjónsson
4	22 July 2000	Liverpool	H	1–0	16,101	Þórðarson 29'
5	24 July 2000	Darlington	N	3–1		Heath, Lightbourne, Guðjónsson
6	26 July 2000	Bury	N	1–2		O'Connor
7	28 July 2000	Isle of Man	A	5–1	213	Þórðarson, Thomas, Gunnarsson, Lightbourne (2)
8	1 August 2000	Birmingham City	H	2–1	5,148	Þórðarson 20', Connor 89'
9	4 August 2000	Newcastle Town	A	3–0	2,153	Connor, Lightbourne, Georges Rossi

=== Football League Second Division ===
Match	Date	Opponent	Venue	Result	Attendance	Scorers	Report
1	12 August 2000	Wycombe Wanderers	H	0–0	14,532		Report
2	19 August 2000	Bristol City	A	2–1	12,590	Guðjónsson 76', O'Connor 87'	Report
3	26 August 2000	Notts County	H	0–1	13,041		Report
4	29 August 2000	Reading	A	3–3	10,668	Hunter (o.g.) 17', Þórðarson 22', Fenton 75'	Report
5	9 September 2000	Peterborough United	H	3–0	13,011	Lightbourne 53', Þórðarson 87', Kavanagh 90'	Report
6	13 September 2000	Oxford United	H	4–0	9,600	Þórðarson 22', Guðjónsson 32', O'Connor 45', Robinson 71'	Report
7	13 September 2000	Port Vale	A	1–1	8,948	Lightbourne 15'	Report
8	23 September 2000	Rotherham United	H	1–1	13,472	Thorne 81'	Report
9	30 September 2000	Colchester United	A	1–0	3,758	Thorne 14'	Report
10	14 October 2000	Swansea City	A	1–2	6,498	Lightbourne 88'	Report
11	17 October 2000	Cambridge United	A	1–1	4,433	Thorne 41'	Report
12	21 October 2000	Millwall	H	3–2	13,752	Thorne (2) 8', 13', Iwelumo 90'	Report
13	24 October 2000	Walsall	A	0–3	6,996		Report
14	28 October 2000	Bournemouth	H	2–1	11,572	Guðjónsson 9', O'Connor 13'	Report
15	4 November 2000	Wrexham	A	2–1	6,447	Thorne 16', Þórðarson 27' (pen)	Report
16	7 November 2000	Northampton Town	A	2–2	5,475	Kavanagh 10', O'Connor 24'	Report
17	11 November 2000	Oldham Athletic	H	0–1	12,503		Report
18	25 November 2000	Swindon Town	A	3–0	4,904	Dryden 8' (o.g.), Lightbourne (2) 11', 78'	Report
19	2 December 2000	Luton Town	H	1–3	12,389	Mohan 35'	Report
20	16 December 2000	Bristol Rovers	A	3–0	6,338	Thorne (3) 3', 19', 40'	Report
21	23 December 2000	Wigan Athletic	A	1–1	8,957	O'Connor 65'	Report
22	26 December 2000	Bury	H	2–1	16,499	Daðason 39', Gunnarsson 84'	Report
23	30 December 2000	Bristol City	H	1–0	14,629	Guðjónsson 81'	Report
24	1 January 2001	Notts County	A	2–2	9,125	Guðjónsson 1', Cooke 80'	Report
25	13 January 2001	Reading	H	0–0	14,154		Report
26	17 January 2001	Brentford	H	1–0	9,350	Daðason 22'	Report
27	27 January 2001	Wigan Athletic	H	2–0	16,859	Cooke 18', Thorne 60'	Report
28	3 February 2001	Northampton Town	H	1–1	13,235	Cooke 59'	Report
29	10 February 2001	Peterborough United	A	4–0	7,568	Thorne 2', Guðjónsson 45', Daðason 72', O'Connor 89'	Report
30	17 February 2001	Port Vale	H	1–1	22,133	O'Connor 55'	Report
31	20 February 2001	Oxford United	A	1–1	4,856	Cooke 69'	Report
32	24 February 2001	Rotherham United	A	1–2	8,211	Thorne 53'	Report
33	3 March 2001	Colchester United	H	3–1	11,714	Thorne (2) 9', 40', Kavanagh 88'	Report
34	7 March 2001	Swansea City	H	1–2	10,091	O'Connor 81'	Report
35	10 March 2001	Brentford	A	2–2	5,518	Cooke 17', Daðason 90'	Report
36	13 March 2001	Wycombe Wanderers	A	1–0	5,385	Kavanagh 11' (pen)	Report
37	17 March 2001	Cambridge United	H	2–3	11,939	Kavanagh 56', (pen), O'Connor 57'	Report
38	27 March 2001	Bury	A	0–1	4,224		Report
39	31 March 2001	Bristol Rovers	H	4–1	12,274	Hansson (2) 4', 15', Thorne (2) 71', 86'	Report
40	3 April 2001	Millwall	A	0–2	11,639		Report
41	7 April 2001	Luton Town	A	2–1	6,456	Taylor (o.g.) 30', Kavanagh 40'	Report
42	14 April 2001	Walsall	H	0–0	16,603		Report
43	17 April 2001	Bournemouth	A	0–1	5,373		Report
44	21 April 2001	Wrexham	H	3–1	12,687	Hardy (o.g) 6', Gunnarsson (2) 44', 56'	Report
45	28 April 2001	Oldham Athletic	A	2–1	9,359	Gunnarsson 73', Daðason 84'	Report
46	5 May 2001	Swindon Town	H	4–1	20,591	O'Halloran 1' (o.g.), Gunnarsson 12', Cooke 32', Kavanagh 45' (pen)	Report

=== Second Division play-offs ===
Round	Date	Opponent	Venue	Result	Attendance	Scorers	Report
Semi-final 1st Leg	13 May 2001	Walsall	H	0–0	21,482		Report
Semi-final 2nd Leg	16 May 2001	Walsall	A	2–4	8,346	Kavanagh 31', Thorne 87'	Report

=== FA Cup ===
Round	Date	Opponent	Venue	Result	Attendance	Scorers	Report
R1	18 November 2000	Nuneaton Borough	H	0–0	8,437		Report
R1 Replay	21 November 2000	Nuneaton Borough	A	0–1	4,477		Report

=== League Cup ===
Round	Date	Opponent	Venue	Result	Attendance	Scorers	Report
R1 1st Leg	22 August 2000	York City	A	5–1	2,035	Heath 10', Connor (2) 47', 59', Iwelumo 70', O'Connor 80'	Report
R1 2nd Leg	6 September 2000	York City	H	0–0	3,478		Report
R2 1st Leg	20 September 2000	Charlton Athletic	H	2–1	9,388	Þórðarson 45' (pen), Goodfellow 86'	Report
R2 2nd Leg	26 September 2000	Charlton Athletic	A	3–4 (aet)	10,037	O'Connor 36', Gunnarsson 87', Þórðarson 107'	Report
R3	1 November 2000	Barnsley	H	3–2	10,480	Guðjónsson (2) 8', 56', Daðason 90'	Report
R4	29 November 2000	Liverpool	H	0–8	27,109		Report

=== League Trophy ===
Round	Date	Opponent	Venue	Result	Attendance	Scorers	Report
R1	6 December 2000	Scarborough	H	3–1	2,336	Thorne (2) 21', 57', Cooke 25'	Report
R2	9 January 2001	Halifax Town	A	3–2	1,917	Daðason 31', Guðjónsson (2) 35', 90'	Report
QF	7 February 2001	Walsall	H	4–0	5,624	Clarke 3', Goodfellow 59', Petty 67', Þórðarson 81' (pen)	Report
SF	5 March 2001	Port Vale	H	1–2 (aet)	11,323	Mohan 87'	Report

== Squad statistics ==
No.	Pos.	Name	League		FA Cup		League Cup		League Trophy		Play-offs		Total		Discipline	
No.	Pos.	Name	Apps	Goals	Apps	Goals	Apps	Goals	Apps	Goals	Apps	Goals	Apps	Goals	Yellow card	Red card
1	GK	(England) Gavin Ward	17	0	0	0	3	0	0	0	2	0	22	0	0	0
2	DF	(Sweden) Mikael Hansson	36(2)	2	2	0	4	0	1(1)	0	1	0	44(3)	2	0	0
3	DF	(Republic of Ireland) Clive Clarke	12(9)	0	1(1)	0	5(1)	0	3	1	2	0	23(11)	1	3	0
4	MF	(Denmark) Henrik Risom	9(16)	0	1	0	2(2)	0	4	0	0	0	16(18)	0	1	0
5	DF	(England) Nicky Mohan	37	1	2	0	6	0	2	1	1	0	49	2	8	1
6	MF	(Iceland) Brynjar Gunnarsson	46	5	1	0	6	1	1(1)	0	2	0	56(1)	6	11	1
7	MF	(Iceland) Bjarni Guðjónsson	41(1)	6	2	0	5	2	2(1)	2	2	0	52(2)	10	10	0
8	MF	(Republic of Ireland) Graham Kavanagh	42(1)	7	2	0	4(1)	0	2	0	2	1	52(2)	8	7	0
9	FW	(England) Peter Thorne	35(3)	16	2	0	3(1)	0	2(1)	2	1(1)	1	43(6)	19	3	0
10	FW	(Iceland) Ríkharður Daðason	13(14)	6	0(1)	0	0(1)	1	2(1)	1	1(1)	0	16(18)	8	0	0
12	FW	(Bermuda) Kyle Lightbourne	11(11)	5	3	0	0(1)	0	0	0	0	0	14(12)	5	3	0
14	GK	(England) Carl Muggleton	11(1)	0	2	0	3	0	0	0	0	0	16(1)	0	0	0
15	MF	(England) Tony Dorigo	34(2)	0	1	0	3	0	0	0	1	0	39(2)	0	2	0
16	FW	(England) Paul Connor	1(6)	0	0	0	1(1)	2	0	0	0	0	2(7)	2	0	0
17	MF	(Republic of Ireland) James O'Connor	44	8	0(1)	0	5	2	2	0	2	0	53(1)	10	14	0
18	DF	(England) Ben Petty	10(12)	0	2	0	3(1)	0	4	1	0(1)	0	19(14)	1	5	2
19	FW	(Iceland) Stefán Þórðarson	15(15)	4	2	0	4(2)	2	3(1)	1	0(1)	0	24(19)	7	6	0
20	DF	(Iceland) Kristján Örn Sigurðsson	0	0	0	0	0	0	0	0	0	0	0	0	0	0
21	MF	(England) Robert Heath	0	0	0	0	1	1	0	0	0	0	1	1	0	0
22	FW	(Scotland) Chris Iwelumo	0(2)	1	0	0	0(2)	1	0	0	0	0	0(4)	2	0	0
23	DF	(England) Wayne Thomas	33(1)	0	1	0	3(1)	0	4	0	2	0	43(2)	0	9	1
24	DF	(England) Matthew Bullock	0	0	0	0	0	0	0	0	0	0	0	0	0	0
25	DF	(England) Ashley Wooliscroft	0	0	0	0	0	0	0	0	0	0	0	0	0	0
26	FW	(England) Steven Taaffe	0	0	0	0	0	0	0	0	0	0	0	0	0	0
27	DF	(Norway) Frode Kippe	15(4)	0	0	0	0	0	3	0	2	0	20(4)	0	1	0
28	MF	(England) Lewis Neal	0(1)	0	0	0	0	0	0(2)	0	0	0	0(3)	0	0	0
29	FW	(England) Marc Goodfellow	0(7)	0	0(1)	0	0(2)	1	2	1	0	0	2(10)	2	0	0
31	MF	(England) Graham Fenton	2(3)	1	0	0	2	0	0	0	0	0	4(3)	1	1	0
32	FW	(England) Marvin Robinson	3	1	0	0	0	0	0	0	0	0	3	1	2	0
33	GK	(Iceland) Hjörvar Hafliðason	0	0	0	0	0	0	0	0	0	0	0	0	0	0
34	FW	(England) Andy Cooke	21(1)	6	0	0	0	0	2(1)	1	1(1)	0	24(3)	7	4	0
35	DF	(England) Lee Collins	0	0	0	0	0(1)	0	0	0	0	0	0(1)	0	0	0
36	GK	(Iceland) Birkir Kristinsson	18	0	0	0	0	0	4	0	0	0	22	0	0	0
37	MF	(England) Karl Henry	0	0	0	0	0	0	0(1)	0	0	0	0(1)	0	0	0
–	–	Own goals	–	5	–	0	–	0	–	0	–	0	–	5	–	–
