= Ashley Wooliscroft =

English footballer

Personal information
- Full name: Ashley David Wooliscroft
- Date of birth: 28 December 1979 (age 46)
- Place of birth: Stoke-on-Trent, England
- Position: Defender

Youth career
- 1996–1998: Stoke City

Senior career*
Years	Team	Apps	(Gls)
1998–2001	Stoke City	1	(0)
2001–2003	Telford United	48	(0)
2003–2004	Newtown		
2004–2006	Leek Town		
2006–2007	Kidsgrove Athletic		
2007	Hednesford Town	4	(0)
2007–2009	Stalybridge Celtic	61	(0)
2009	Newcastle Town		
2009	Fleetwood Town		
2010	Leek Town		
2010	AFC Telford United		
2011	Leek Town		
- * Club domestic league appearances and goals

Ashley David Wooliscroft (born 28 December 1979) is an English retired footballer who played in the Football League for Stoke City.

== Career ==
Wooliscroft was born in Stoke-on-Trent and began his career with local side Stoke City and made his debut for the club on the final day of the 1998–99 season, coming on as a substitute in a 2–0 win over Walsall. In 1999–2000 he played once which came in a FA Cup defeat away at Blackpool. After failing to make an appearance in 2000–01 he was released by Stoke and joined Telford United. He has since played for a large number of non-league and semi-professional clubs. In 2013, he took joint-managerial duties at Leek CSOB.

== Career statistics ==
Club	Season	League			FA Cup		League Cup		Other^{[A]}		Total	
Club	Season	Division	Apps	Goals	Apps	Goals	Apps	Goals	Apps	Goals	Apps	Goals
Stoke City	1998–99	Second Division	1	0	0	0	0	0	0	0	1	0
Stoke City	1999–2000	Second Division	0	0	1	0	0	0	0	0	1	0
Stoke City	2000–01	Second Division	0	0	0	0	0	0	0	0	0	0
Career Total			1	0	1	0	0	0	0	0	2	0

A. The "Other" column constitutes appearances and goals in the Football League Trophy.
