= 2003–04 Bristol City F.C. season =

Bristol City
2003–04 season
- Chairman: Steve Lansdown
- Manager: Danny Wilson
- Stadium: Ashton Gate
- Second Division: 3rd
- FA Cup: Second round
- League Cup: Third round
- Football League Trophy: Southern Area First Round
- Top goalscorer: League: Lee Peacock (14); All: Lee Peacock (16)

The 2003–04 season was Bristol City Football Club's 106th season in English football, and their fifth consecutive season in the Second Division. It was Danny Wilson's fourth and final year in charge of the club since his arrival in July 2000. After narrowly missing out on automatic promotion by a single point to QPR, the club made the Second Division Play-off final in Cardiff, where they fell to a 1–0 defeat to Brighton & Hove Albion.

The club's leading goalscorer was Lee Peacock, with 16 goals in all competitions.

== Final league table ==
Pos	Team	Pld	W	D	L	GF	GA	GD	Pts	Promotion or relegation
1	Plymouth Argyle (C, P)	46	26	12	8	85	41	+44	90	Promotion to Football League Championship
2	Queens Park Rangers (P)	46	22	17	7	80	45	+35	83	Promotion to Football League Championship
3	Bristol City	46	23	13	10	58	37	+21	82	Qualification for the Second Division play-offs
4	Brighton & Hove Albion (O, P)	46	22	11	13	64	43	+21	77	Qualification for the Second Division play-offs
5	Swindon Town	46	20	13	13	76	58	+18	73	Qualification for the Second Division play-offs

Rules for classification: In the Football League goals scored (GF) takes precedence over goal difference (GD).
(C) Champions; (O) Play-off winners; (P) Promoted

== Results ==
Bristol City's score comes first

=== Legend ===
Win	Draw	Loss

=== Football League Second Division ===
Date	Opponent	Venue	Result	Attendance	Scorers
9 August 2003	Notts County	H	5–0	12,050	Peacock (2), Matthews (2), Miller
16 August 2003	Chesterfield	A	1–1	12,050	Coles
23 August 2003	Hartlepool United	H	1–1	10,730	Peacock
26 August 2003	Colchester United	A	1–2	3,079	Peacock
30 August 2003	Grimsby Town	H	1–0	10,033	Roberts
6 September 2003	Bournemouth	A	0–0	6,756	
13 September 2003	Oldham Athletic	A	1–1	5,921	Butler
16 September 2003	Tranmere Rovers	H	2–0	9,365	Brown, Peacock
20 September 2003	Port Vale	H	0–1	11,369	
27 September 2003	Queens Park Rangers	A	1–1	14,913	Miller
30 September 2003	Plymouth Argyle	A	1–0	13,923	Peacock
4 October 2003	Swindon Town	H	2–1	14,294	Peacock, Brown
10 October 2003	Peterborough United	H	1–1	11,053	Tinnion
18 October 2003	Wrexham	A	0–0	4,405	
21 October 2003	Wycombe Wanderers	A	0–3	4,613	
25 October 2003	Sheffield Wednesday	H	1–1	13,668	Peacock
1 November 2003	Luton Town	H	1–1	9,735	Burnell
15 November 2003	Brighton & Hove Albion	A	4–1	6,305	Wilkshire, Miller, Brown, Hill
22 November 2003	Barnsley	H	2–1	10,031	Miller (2)
29 November 2003	Blackpool	A	0–1	5,989	
13 December 2003	Rushden & Diamonds	A	1–1	4,340	Miller
20 December 2003	Stockport County	H	1–0	10,478	Peacock
26 December 2003	Brentford	A	2–1	5,912	Lita (2)
28 December 2003	Bournemouth	H	2–0	13,807	Peacock, Brown
10 January 2004	Notts County	A	2–1	6,403	Peacock, Goodfellow
17 January 2004	Chesterfield	H	4–0	11,807	Doherty, Lita, Carey, Goodfellow
24 January 2004	Hartlepool United	A	2–1	5,375	Peacock, Tinnion
27 January 2004	Colchester United	H	1–0	10,733	Goodfellow
7 February 2004	Brentford	H	3–1	13,029	Miller, Hill, Lita
14 February 2004	Peterborough United	A	1–0	4,449	Doherty
17 February 2004	Grimsby Town	A	2–1	5,272	Miller, Brown
21 February 2004	Wrexham	H	1–0	13,871	Wilkshire
28 February 2004	Sheffield Wednesday	A	0–1	24,154	
2 March 2004	Wycombe Wanderers	H	1–1	12,291	Goodfellow
6 March 2004	Stockport County	A	0–2	5,050	
12 March 2004	Rushden & Diamonds	H	1–0	12,559	Lita
20 March 2004	Oldham Athletic	H	0–2	11,037	
24 March 2004	Tranmere Rovers	A	0–1	6,712	
27 March 2004	Port Vale	A	1–2	6,724	Peacock
3 April 2004	Queens Park Rangers	H	1–0	19,041	Roberts
10 April 2004	Swindon Town	A	1–1	14,540	Roberts
13 April 2004	Plymouth Argyle	H	1–0	19,045	Peacock
17 April 2004	Luton Town	A	2–3	6,944	Roberts, Coles
24 April 2004	Brighton & Hove Albion	H	0–0	17,088	
2 May 2004	Barnsley	A	1–0	10,865	Rougier
8 May 2004	Blackpool	H	2–1	19,101	Roberts (2)

=== Second Division Play-Offs ===
2004 Football League play-offs

Round	Date	Opponent	Venue	Result	Attendance	Goalscorers
Semi-Final 1st Leg	15 May 2004	Hartlepool United	A	1–1	7,211	Rougier
Semi-Final 2nd Leg	19 May 2004	Hartlepool United	H	2–1	18,434	Goodfellow, Roberts
Second Division Play-Off Final	30 May 2004	Brighton & Hove Albion	Neutral	0–1	65,167	

=== FA Cup ===
Round	Date	Opponent	Venue	Result	Attendance	Goalscorers
R1	9 November 2003	Bradford Park Avenue	A	5–2	1,945	Amankwaah (2), Wilkshire, Matthews, Own goal
R2	6 December 2003	Barnsley	H	0–0	6,741	
R2 Replay	16 December 2003	Barnsley	A	1–2	5,434	Roberts

=== League Cup ===
Round	Date	Opponent	Venue	Result	Attendance	Goalscorers
R1	13 August 2003	Swansea City	H	4–1	5,807	Peacock (2), Bell, Coles
R2	23 September 2003	Watford	H	1–0	5,213	Miller
R3	28 October 2003	Southampton	H	0–3	17,408	

=== Football League Trophy ===
Round	Date	Opponent	Venue	Result	Attendance	Goalscorers
Southern Section R1	14 October 2003	Plymouth Argyle	A	0–4	4,927	
