= Söderköpings IK =

Swedish football club

- Full name: Söderköpings Idrottsklubb
- Founded: 2004
- Ground: Vikingavallen; Söderköping; Sweden
- Chairman: Johan Petersson
- Head coach: Peter Svensson
- League: Division 4 Nordöstra Götaland
- 2013: Division 4 Nordöstra Götaland, 3rd
Home colours	Away colours

Söderköpings IK is a Swedish football club located in Söderköping in Östergötland County.

== Background ==
The eight founders of Söderköpings Idrottssällskap had a vision when they founded the club with confectioner Paul Granander on 12 December 1917 to develop sports and obtain a home ground. This primary objective was achieved in spring 1920 when Vikingavallen was opened. On 13 April 1936 some enterprising young people met in Centralkafeèt in Söderköping and formed Drothems IK which was later named IK Ramunder.

Some 86 years later on 15 January 2004 Söderköpings Idrottsklubb was formed following the merger of Söderköpings IS and IK Ramunder. The visions of the original founders lives on with the natural development of a strong Söderköping sports club.

Since their foundation Söderköpings IK has participated mainly in the middle divisions of the Swedish football league system. The club currently plays in Division 3 Nordöstra Götaland which is the fifth tier of Swedish football. They play their home matches at the Vikingavallen in Söderköping.

Söderköpings IK are affiliated to Östergötlands Fotbollförbund.

== Recent history ==
In recent seasons Söderköpings IK have competed in the following divisions:

2013 – Division III, Nordöstra Götaland
2012 – Division III, Nordöstra Götaland
2011 – Division III, Nordöstra Götaland
2010 – Division III, Nordöstra Götaland
2009 – Division III, Nordöstra Götaland
2008 – Division III, Nordöstra Götaland
2007 – Division IV, Östergötland Östra
2006 – Division IV, Östergötland Östra
2005 – Division IV, Östergötland Östra
2004 – Division III, Västra Svealand

In recent seasons Söderköpings IK have had the following average attendances:

Season	Average attendance	Division / Section	Level
2007	Not available	Div 4 Östergötland Östra	Tier 6
2008	147	Div 3 Nordöstra Götaland	Tier 5
2009	156	Div 3 Nordöstra Götaland	Tier 5
2010	144	Div 3 Nordöstra Götaland	Tier 5
2011	178	Div 3 Nordöstra Götaland	Tier 6
2012	106	Div 3 Nordöstra Götaland	Tier 5

* Attendances are provided in the Publikliga sections of the Svenska Fotbollförbundet website.

== Players ==
=== Current squad ===
Note: Flags indicate national team as defined under FIFA eligibility rules; some limited exceptions apply. Players may hold more than one non-FIFA nationality.

No.	Pos.	Nation	Player
1	GK	SWE	Eddie Andersson
22	GK	SWE	Kennet Andersson
4	DF	SWE	Christoffer Jonsson (captain)
5	DF	SWE	Peter Karlsson
11	DF	SWE	David Kristiansson
13	DF	SWE	Lasse Salmenranta
15	DF	SWE	Johan Larsson
16	DF	SWE	Robin Lindroos
19	DF	SWE	Mattias Samuelsson
23	DF	SWE	Kristian Karlsson
2	MF	SWE	Fredrik Esting
3	MF	SWE	Johan Jirlund
7	MF	SWE	Danny Hansson

No.	Pos.	Nation	Player
8	MF	SWE	Niclas Gustafsson
10	MF	DEN	Michael Schepler
14	MF	SWE	Jonathan Lagerlund
18	MF	SWE	Fredrik Nygren
20	MF	SWE	David Mark
21	MF	SWE	Andreas Karlsson
25	MF	SWE	Carl Jonsson
26	MF	SWE	Viktor Lagerlund
29	MF	SWE	Daniel Jirlund
9	FW	SWE	Emil Bohman
12	FW	SWE	Andreas Bengtsson
17	FW	SWE	Erik Furenhed
24	FW	SWE	Marcus Nilsson
