= St. Lawrence's Church, Söderköping =

Church of Sweden church building in Söderköping, Sweden

Coordinates: 58°28′48.73″N 16°19′9.71″E

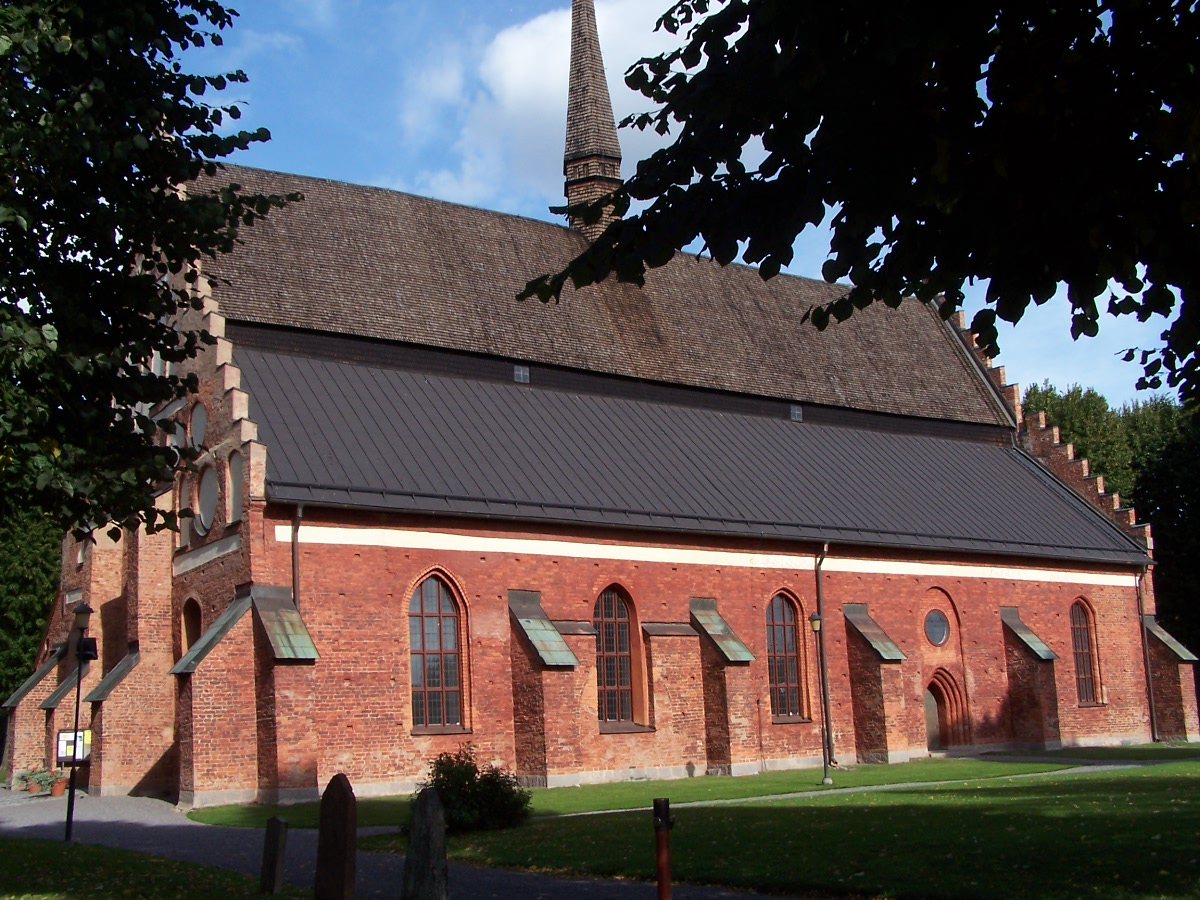
St. Lawrence's Church, Söderköping.

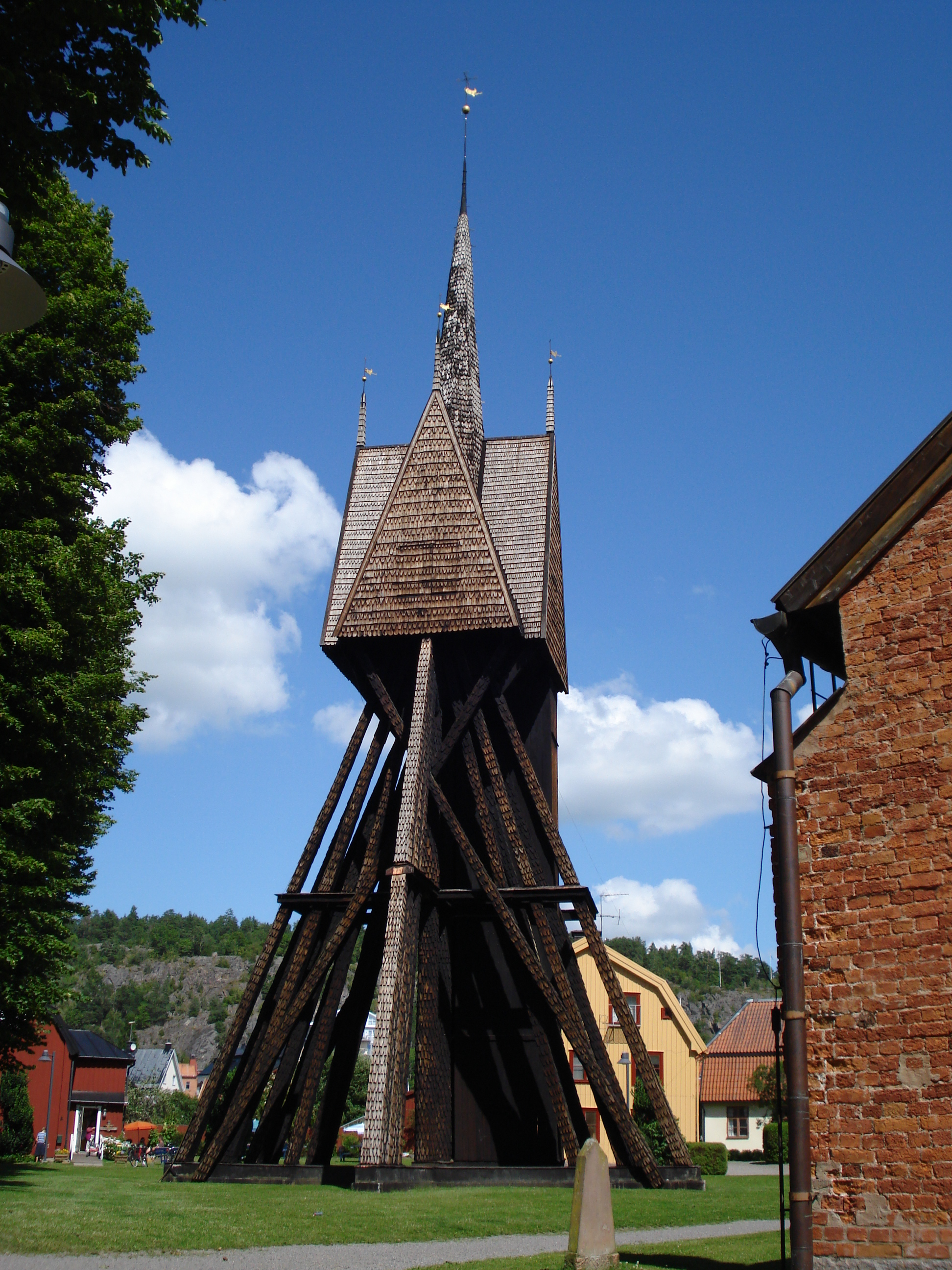
Adjacent Bell Tower

St. Lawrence's Church (Swedish: S:t Laurentii kyrka) is a medieval Lutheran church in Söderköping, Sweden. The original church was dedicated to Lawrence of Rome and the church retained its name also following the Reformation. It is located in central Söderköping and functions as a parish church within the Diocese of Linköping. It is one of two surviving medieval churches in Söderköping, the other being Drothem Church (Drothems kyrka). Both churches are associated with the Diocese of Linköping of the Church of Sweden.

== History ==
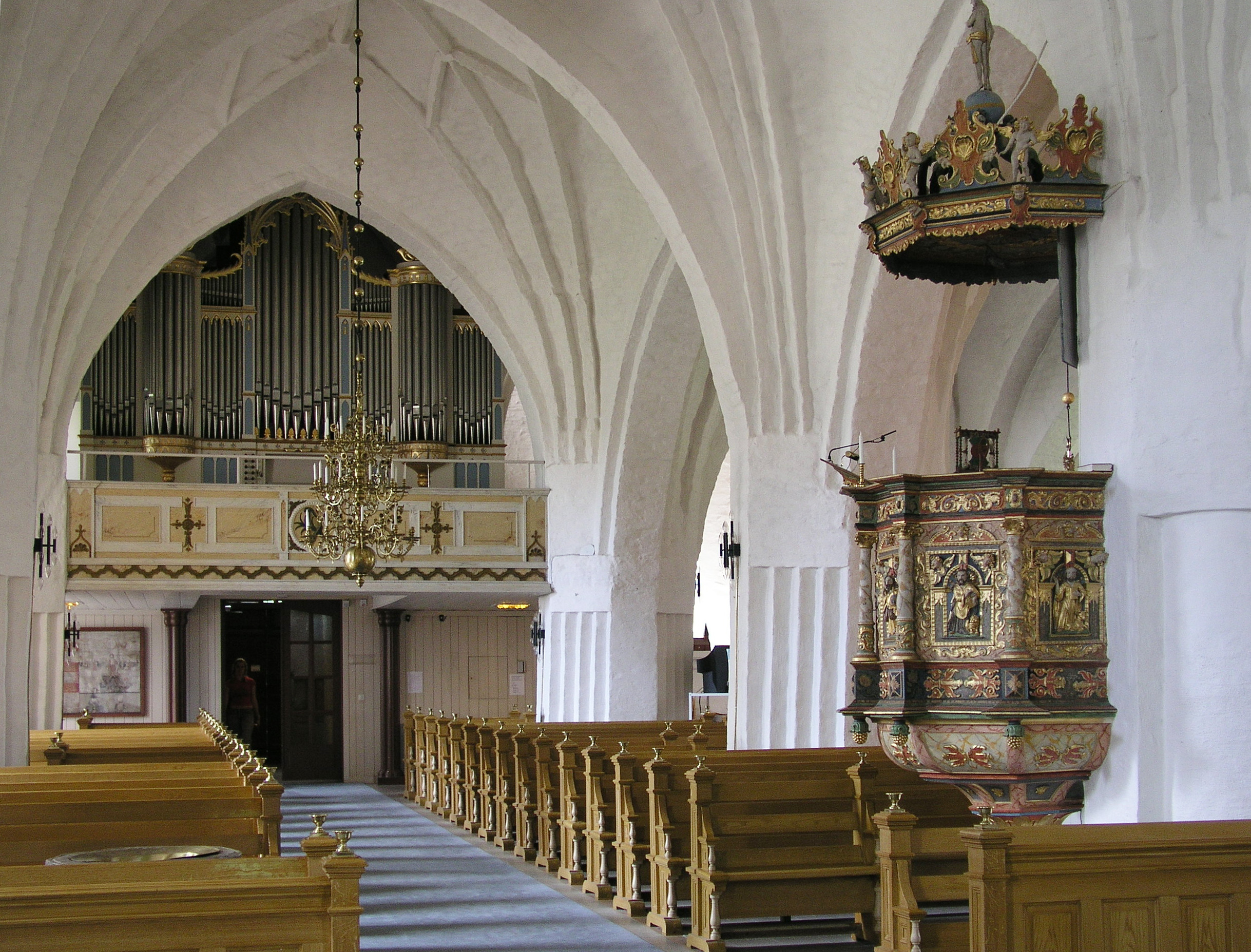
Interior view of the church.

The church has a long and complicated history that goes back to sometime around the end of the 13th century or the very beginning of the 14th. It is one of few medieval churches in Östergötland built entirely in brick, a circumstance which may be connected to there being a large number of German merchants active in Söderköping at the time, and it remains a fine Swedish example of Brick Gothic. The original church had the form of a basilica with a central nave and two aisles.

During a city fire in 1494 the church was damaged and subsequently rebuilt. An external belfry was erected in the 1580s. During its history, it has been reconstructed, renovated (not least as a consequence of damage from recurrent floodings caused by the nearby Söderköpingsån) and altered on several occasions, but retains much of its medieval form and look. Externally, the church is dominated by its red brick façade, interspersed with blind arches and supported by brick buttresses. As it has no protruding apse, both the west and the east end of the church is marked by straight façades that end in crow-stepped gables. On the external wall of the vestry, St. Lawrence is depicted. During a renovation in 1965, an immured runestone was discovered and laid bare in one of the walls.

== Architecture ==
The interior today is a typical hall church, dominated by white-washed vaulting. Remains of medieval fresco painting has been laid bare during 20th-century restorations. The church also contains some noteworthy inventories, such as a late medieval altarpiece, possibly French; a Triumph Cross possibly made in Vadstena circa 1400; a processional crucifix from the 13th century and several medieval carved wooden statuettes of saints.

The church has been the venue for royal coronations in Sweden on two occasions. The first time was when Helvig of Holstein, wife of King Magnus Ladulås, was crowned Queen of Sweden on 29 June 1281. The second was when Birger Magnusson and Martha of Denmark were crowned King and Queen of Sweden in the church in 1302.

== Gallery ==
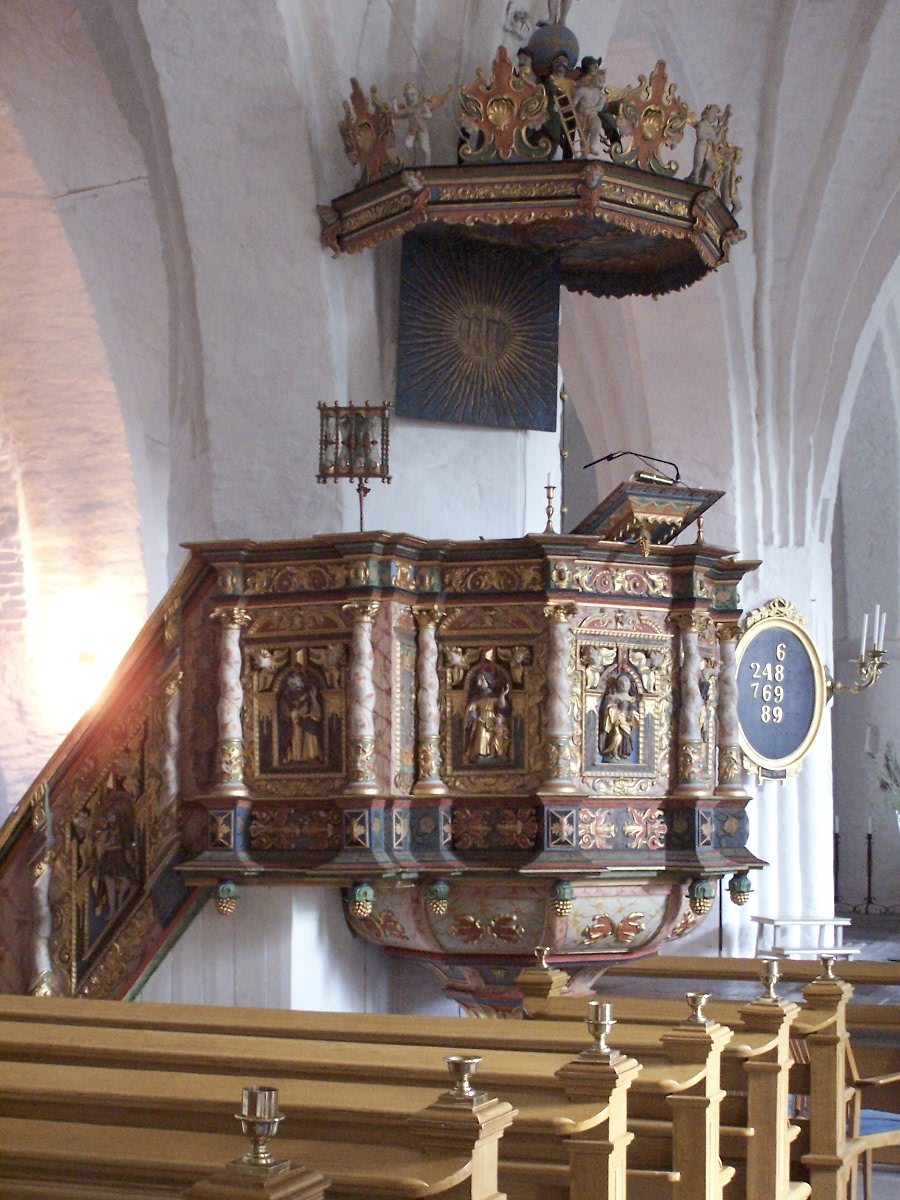
Pulpit

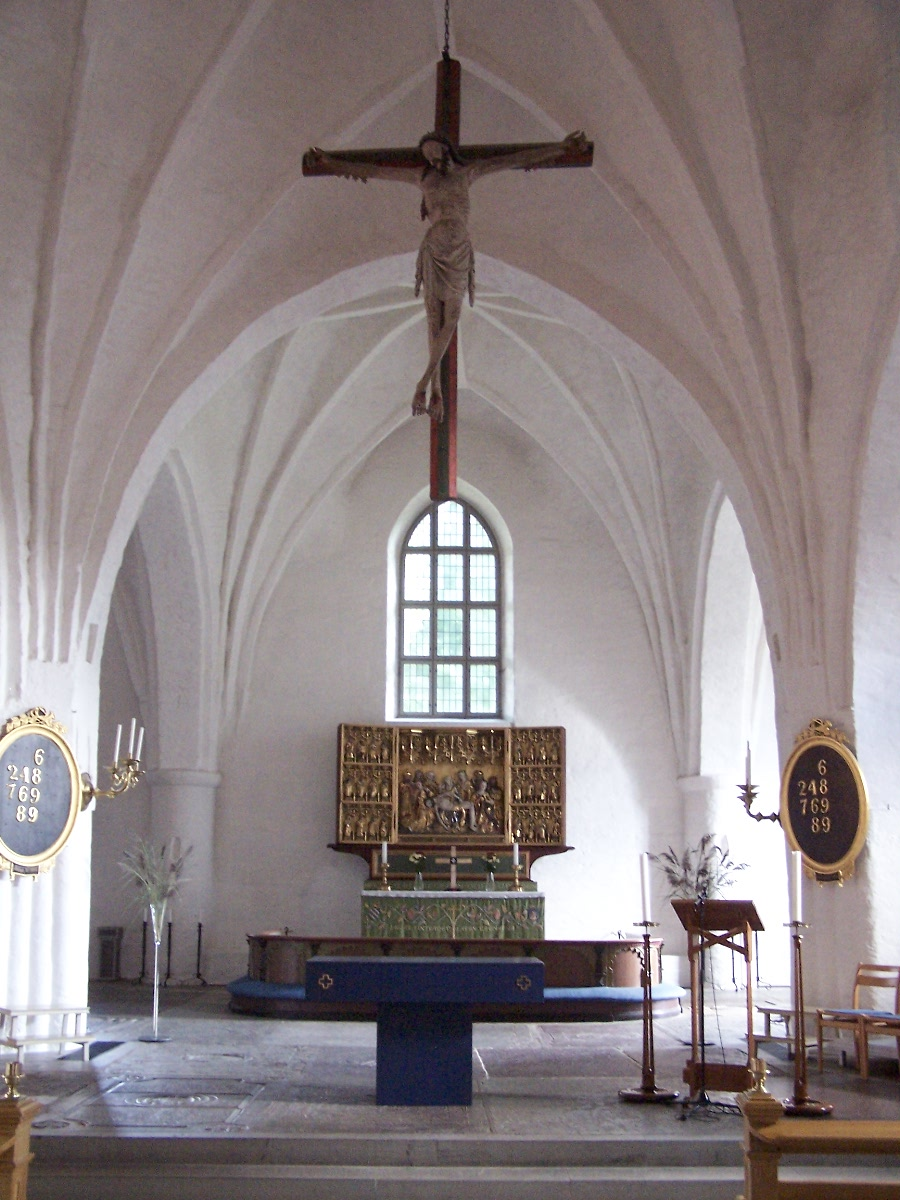
Sanctuary

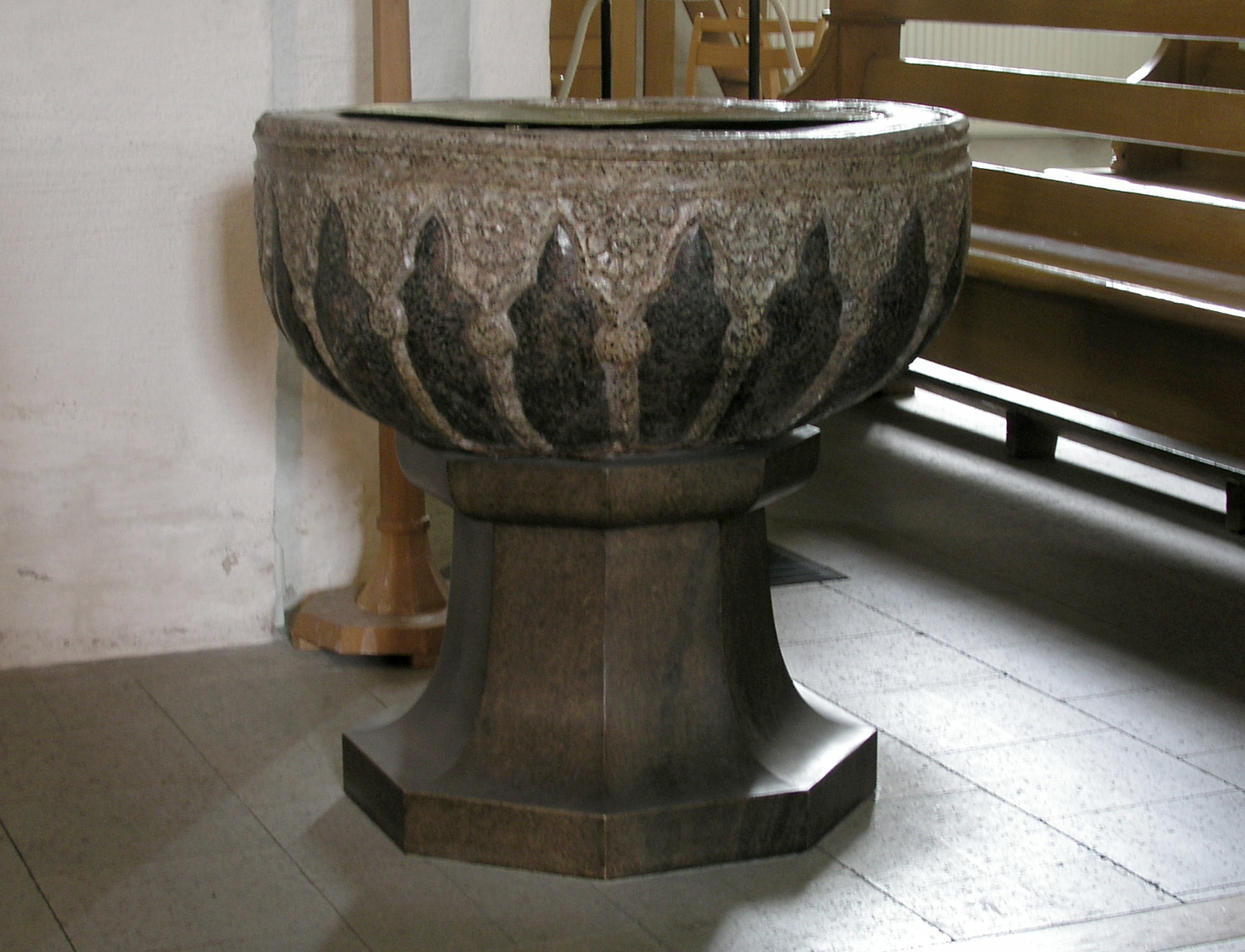
Baptismal font

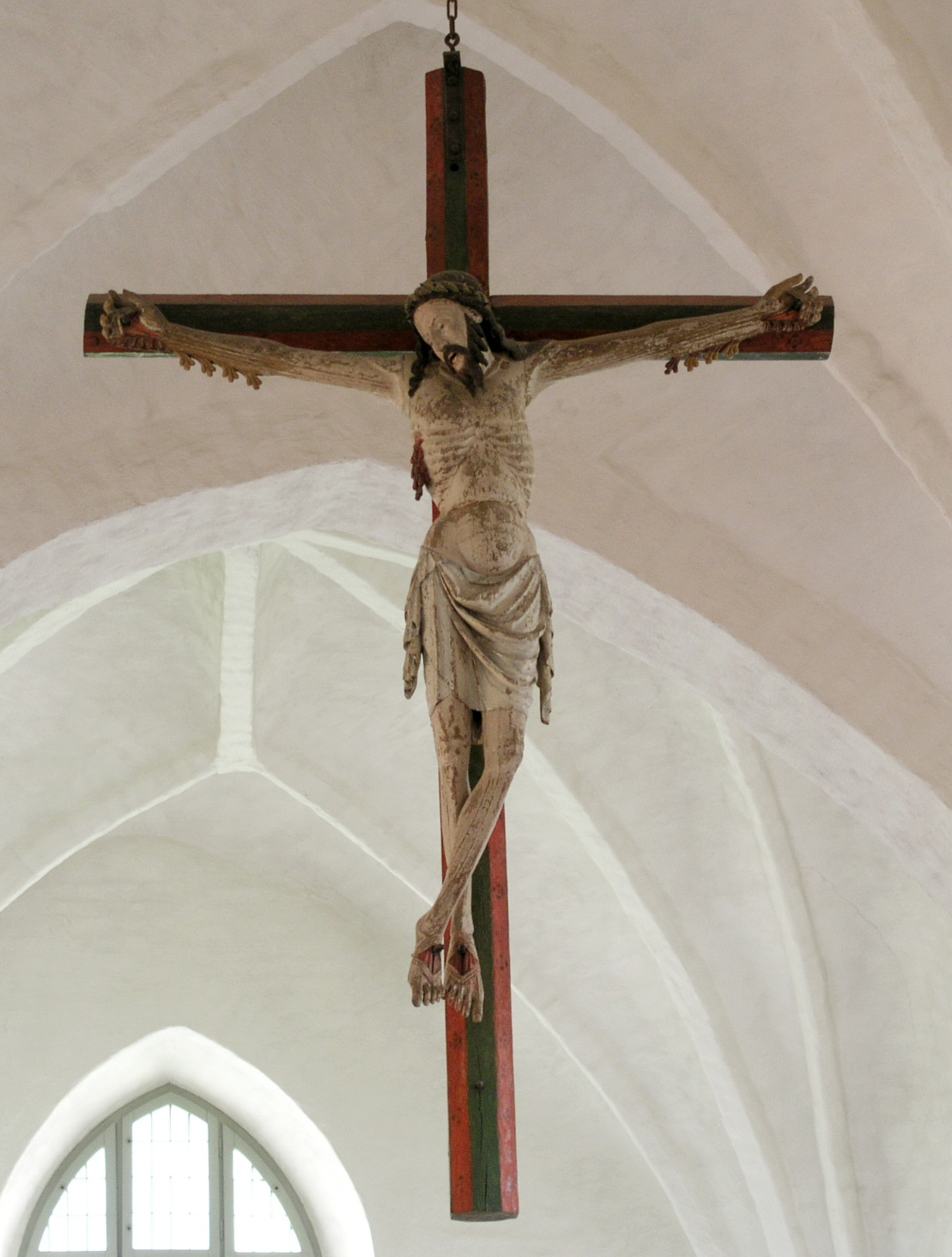
Triumph Cross

== See also ==
- List of Brick Gothic buildings
- List of churches in Sweden
