= Ríkharður Daðason =

Icelandic footballer

Personal information
- Date of birth: 26 April 1972 (age 54)
- Place of birth: Reykjavík, Iceland
- Height: 1.90 m (6 ft 3 in)
- Position: Striker

Senior career*
Years	Team	Apps	(Gls)
1989–1995	Fram Reykjavik	119	(44)
1997	Kalamata	10	(1)
1996-1997	KR	34	(21)
1998–2000	Viking	69	(47)
2000–2002	Stoke City	38	(10)
2002–2003	Lillestrøm	12	(4)
2003	Fredrikstad	9	(4)
2004–2005	Fram Reykjavik	28	(10)
Total		301	(127)

International career
1991–2003	Iceland	44	(14)

Managerial career
- 2013: Fram Reykjavik
- * Club domestic league appearances and goals

Ríkharður Daðason (born 26 April 1972) is an Icelandic former professional footballer who played as a striker for Fram Reykjavik, KR, Kalamata, Viking, Stoke City, Lillestrøm and Fredrikstad.

== Education ==
Daðason graduated from Columbia University, where he played on the varsity football team, in 1996 and was inducted into Columbia's athletics hall of fame in 2010.

== Club career ==
Daðason started his career in Fram Reykjavik, and later moved to KR where he became top goalscorer in the Úrvalsdeild in 1996 with 14. His KR career was interrupted by an unsuccessful spell in Greek football with Kalamata. In 1998, he moved to Norwegian club Viking, and after scoring at least 15 goals three seasons in a row he was signed by English club Stoke City in the summer of 2000. Stoke were at the time under the control of an Icelandic board and Ríkharður was one of a number fellow countrymen at join up at the Britannia Stadium, Stoke had to wait until the Norwegian finished before Ríkharður could join them and he made a great start scoring the winning goal against Barnsley with his first touch.

He failed to build on such a good start and scored seven more goals in 2000–01 and became more used by Guðjón Þórðarson as a substitute. He scored four goals in 13 matches in 2001–02 and was released by the club at the end of the season. He returned to Norway and played for Lillestrøm and Fredrikstad before ending his career with a return to Fram.

== International career ==
Daðason made his debut for Iceland in a May 1991 friendly against Malta as a substitute for Grétar Einarsson. He played his last international match in 2003, having been capped 44 times and scoring 14 goals. Daðason scored a legendary goal against France, then recent World Cup Champions, on 5 September 1998. The game ended with a 1–1 draw. He was the top goal scorer of the 2000–01 Nordic Football Championship with 4 goals.

== Career statistics ==
=== Club ===
Appearances and goals by club, season and competition
Club	Season	League			National cup		League cup		Other (Note: Includes Football League play-offs, and Football League Trophy.)		Total	
Club	Season	Division	Apps	Goals	Apps	Goals	Apps	Goals	Apps	Goals	Apps	Goals
Fram	1989	Úrvalsdeild	13	1	—		—		—		13	1
Fram	1990	Úrvalsdeild	17	5	—		—		—		17	5
Fram	1991	Úrvalsdeild	18	4	—		—		—		18	4
Fram	1992	Úrvalsdeild	12	2	—		—		—		12	2
Fram	1993	Úrvalsdeild	12	4	—		—		—		12	4
Fram	1994	Úrvalsdeild	16	9	—		—		—		16	9
Fram	1995	Úrvalsdeild	13	5	—		—		—		13	5
Fram	1996	1. deild karla	18	14	—		—		—		18	14
Fram	Total		119	44	—		—		—		119	44
Kalamata	1996–97	Alpha Ethniki	10	1	—		—		—		10	1
KR	1997	Úrvalsdeild	16	7	—		—		—		16	7
Viking	1998	Tippeligaen	25	15	—		—		—		25	15
Viking	1999	Tippeligaen	21	17	—		—		—		21	17
Viking	2000	Tippeligaen	23	15	—		—		—		23	15
Viking	Total		69	47	—		—		—		69	47
Stoke City	2000–01	Second Division	27	6	1	0	1	1	5	1	34	8
Stoke City	2001–02	Second Division	11	4	2	0	0	0	1	0	14	4
Stoke City	Total		38	10	3	0	1	1	6	1	48	12
Lillestrøm	2002	Tippeligaen	7	4	—		—		—		7	4
Lillestrøm	2003	Tippeligaen	5	0	—		—		—		5	0
Lillestrøm	Total		12	4	—		—		—		12	4
Fredrikstad	2003	Norwegian First Division	9	4	—		—		—		9	4
Fram	2004	Úrvalsdeild	14	7	—		—		—		14	7
Fram	2005	Úrvalsdeild	14	3	—		—		—		14	3
Fram	Total		28	10	—		—		—		28	10
Career total			301	127	3	0	1	1	6	1	311	129

=== International ===
Appearances and goals by national team and year
National team	Year	Apps	Goals
Iceland	1991	2	0
Iceland	1992	0	0
Iceland	1993	1	0
Iceland	1994	0	0
Iceland	1995	0	0
Iceland	1996	4	1
Iceland	1997	6	0
Iceland	1998	7	3
Iceland	1999	8	2
Iceland	2000	8	4
Iceland	2001	4	2
Iceland	2002	2	2
Iceland	2003	2	0
Total		44	14

Scores and results list Iceland's goal tally first, score column indicates score after each Ríkharður goal.

List of international goals scored by Ríkharður Daðason
No.	Date	Venue	Opponent	Score	Result	Competition
1	14 August 1996	Laugardalsvöllur, Reykjavík, Iceland	Malta	2–1	2–1	Friendly
2	5 February 1998	Tsirion Stadium, Limassol, Cyprus	Slovenia	1–1	2–3	Cyprus International Tournament 1998
3	19 August 1998	Laugardalsvöllur, Reykjavík, Iceland	Latvia	3–1	4–1	Friendly
4	5 September 1998	Laugardalsvöllur, Reykjavík, Iceland	France	1–0	1–1	UEFA Euro 2000 qualifying
5	28 April 1999	Ta' Qali National Stadium, Attard, Malta	Malta	2–1	2–1	Friendly
6	5 June 1999	Laugardalsvöllur, Reykjavík, Iceland	Armenia	1–1	2–1	UEFA Euro 2000 qualifying
7	2 February 2000	La Manga Stadium, La Manga, Spain	Finland	1–0	1–0	2000–01 Nordic Football Championship
8	4 February 2000	La Manga Stadium, La Manga, Spain	Faroe Islands	1–2	3–2	2000–01 Nordic Football Championship
9	4 February 2000	La Manga Stadium, La Manga, Spain	Faroe Islands	2–2	3–2	2000–01 Nordic Football Championship
10	14 August 2000	Laugardalsvöllur, Reykjavík, Iceland	Sweden	1–1	2–1	2000–01 Nordic Football Championship
11	2 June 2001	Laugardalsvöllur, Reykjavík, Iceland	Malta	2–0	3–0	2002 FIFA World Cup qualification
12	6 June 2001	Laugardalsvöllur, Reykjavík, Iceland	Bulgaria	1–0	1–1	2002 FIFA World Cup qualification
13	21 August 2002	Laugardalsvöllur, Reykjavík, Iceland	Andorra	2–0	3–0	Friendly
14	21 August 2002	Laugardalsvöllur, Reykjavík, Iceland	Andorra	3–0	3–0	Friendly
