= Drothem Church =

Coordinates: 58°28′51″N 16°18′57″E

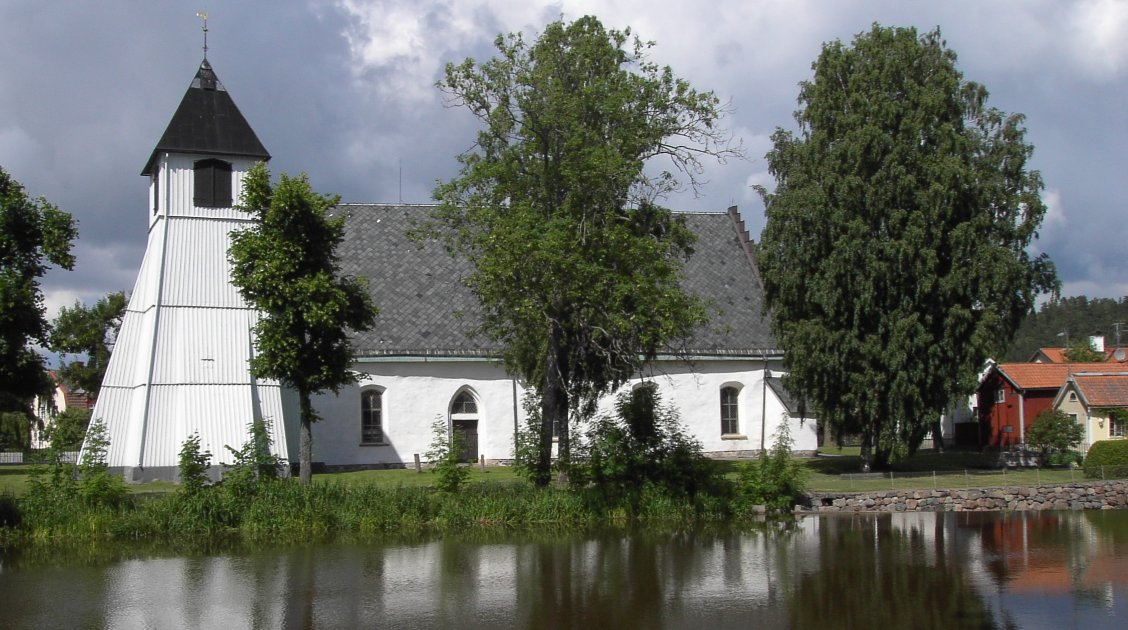
Drothem Church, Söderköping

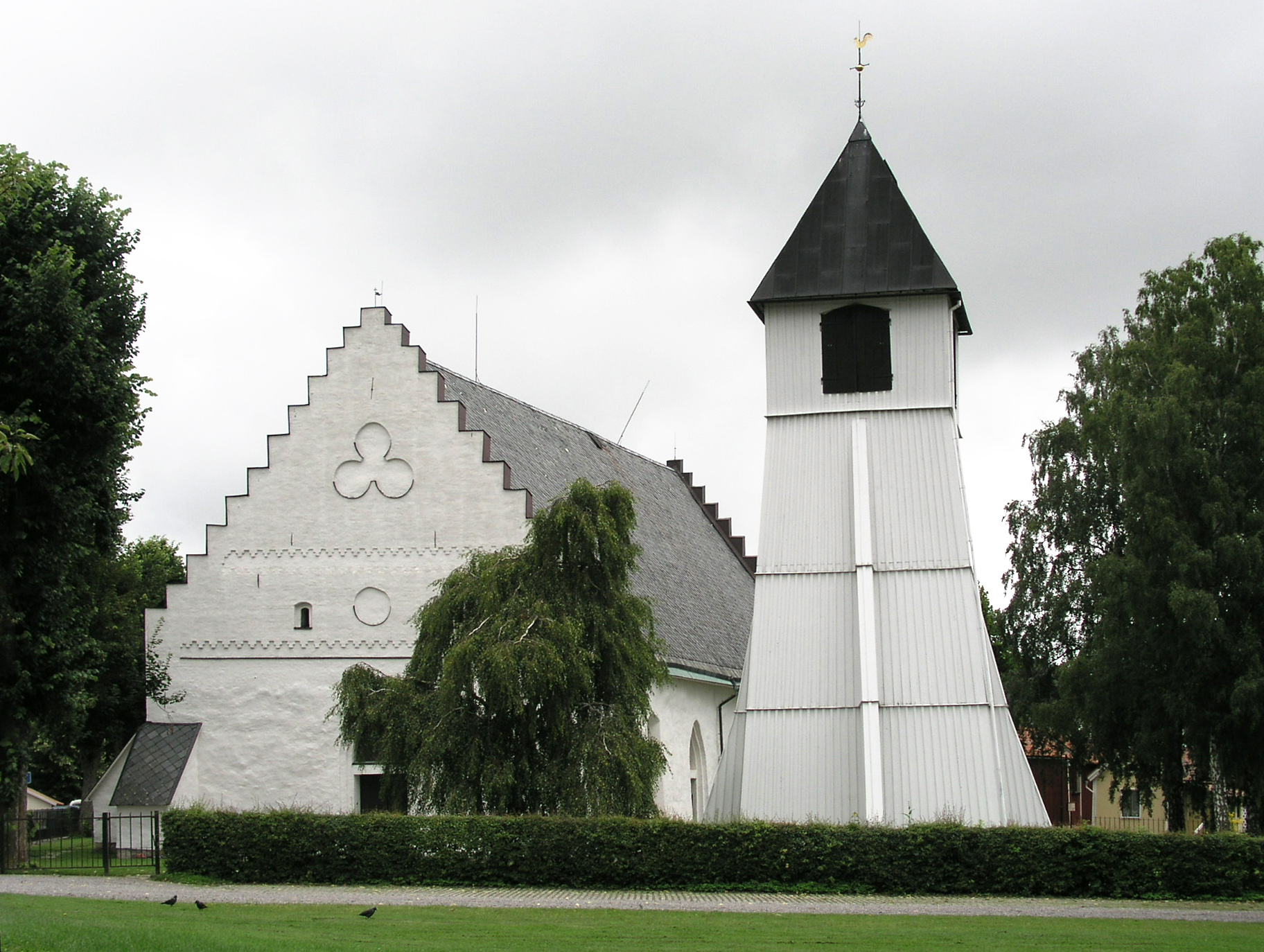
Church and adjacent belfry

Drothem Church (Swedish: Drothems kyrka) is a medieval Lutheran church in Söderköping, Sweden. The church dates back to the end of the 13th or the 14th century and is one of two surviving medieval churches in Söderköping, the other being St. Lawrence's Church (Sankt Laurentii kyrka). Both churches are associated with the Diocese of Linköping of the Church of Sweden.

== History ==
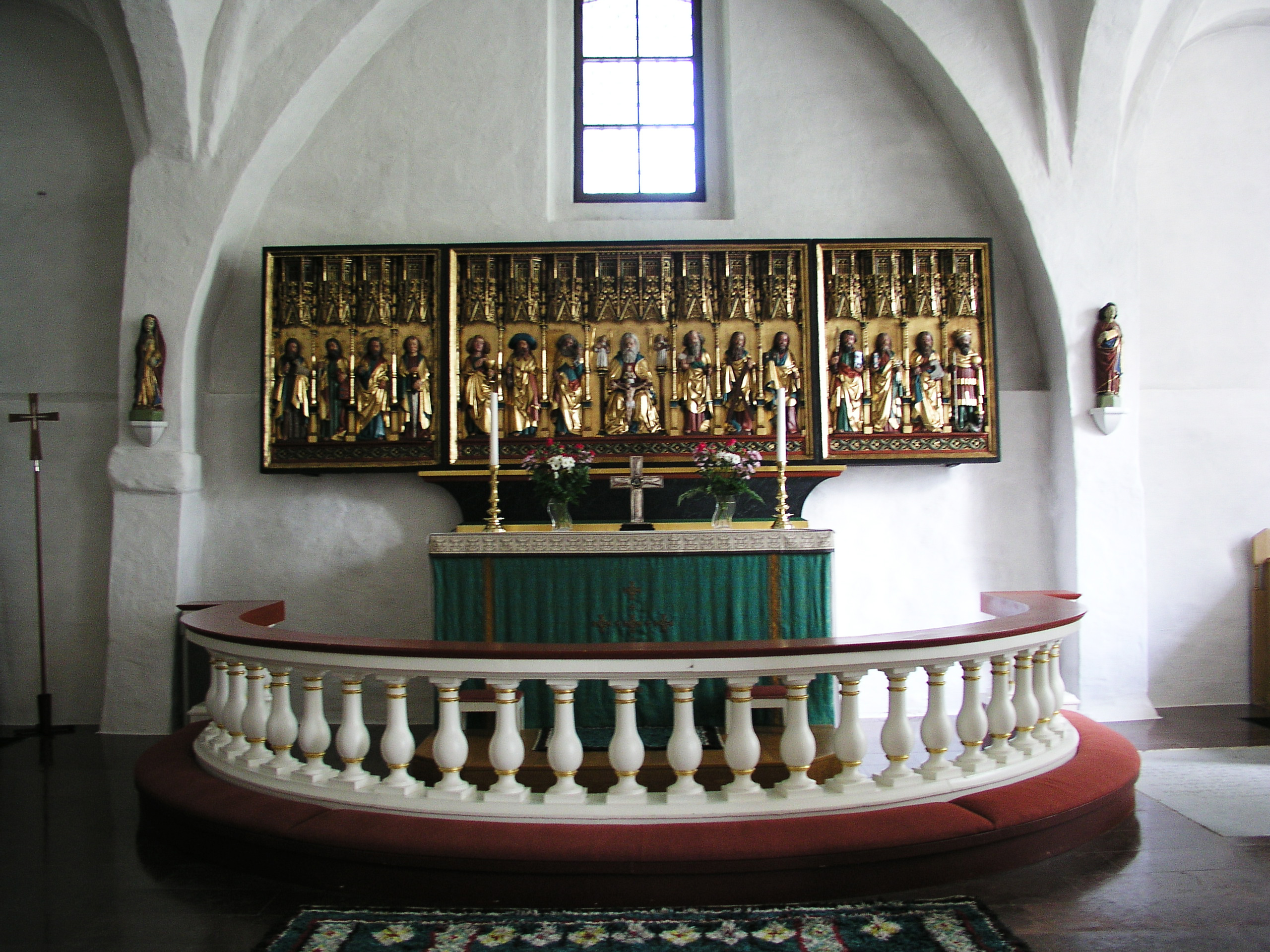
Interior view of the church with the altarpiece from 1512

Drothem church is located on the outskirts of the medieval city centre of Söderköping, on land that once belonged to a nearby royal manor. In contrast to St. Lawrence's Church, Drothem church was referred to as the "peasant's church" and used as a parish church by the rural population rather than the strictly urban. The present church was probably preceded by a wooden church on approximately the same site. Remains of a Franciscan monastery have been excavated in the close vicinity of Drothem church, leading scholars to believe that the church started its history as part of the monastery, which in turn was founded on land donated from the royal manor nearby.

The first written records mentioning the church date from 1307, but construction of the church started sometime during the second half of the 13th century. The present-day vestry is the oldest part of the church. Later alterations have been plentiful, as the church has been damaged both by fire on several occasions, and also in war, during the Northern Seven Years' War when Danish troops under the command of Daniel Rantzau caused damage to the church. In 1586, the church was still in disrepair and the congregation pleaded to the king (John III of Sweden) to help funding the repairs.

== Architecture ==
The church is built of stone with some details made of brick, and whitewashed. Both the west and the east façades are decorated with blind arches and crow-stepped gables. Heavy buttresses support the building. The roof is made of shingle. The church has an external belfry.

Inside, the church is divided into a nave and two aisles by two rows of pillars, carrying Gothic vaults. The altarpiece is in the form of a triptych from Germany. According to a note written in medieval German and found in the altar, it was made in 1512 by a craftsman called Vlögel. The baptismal font is from the 13th century. Other noteworthy interior details include the pulpit and canopy from 1704 and an altar painting from the 17th century, originally forming part of an epitaph.

== Gallery ==
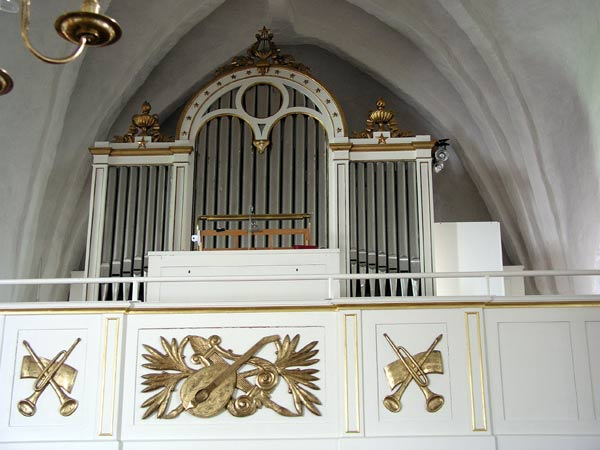
Organ

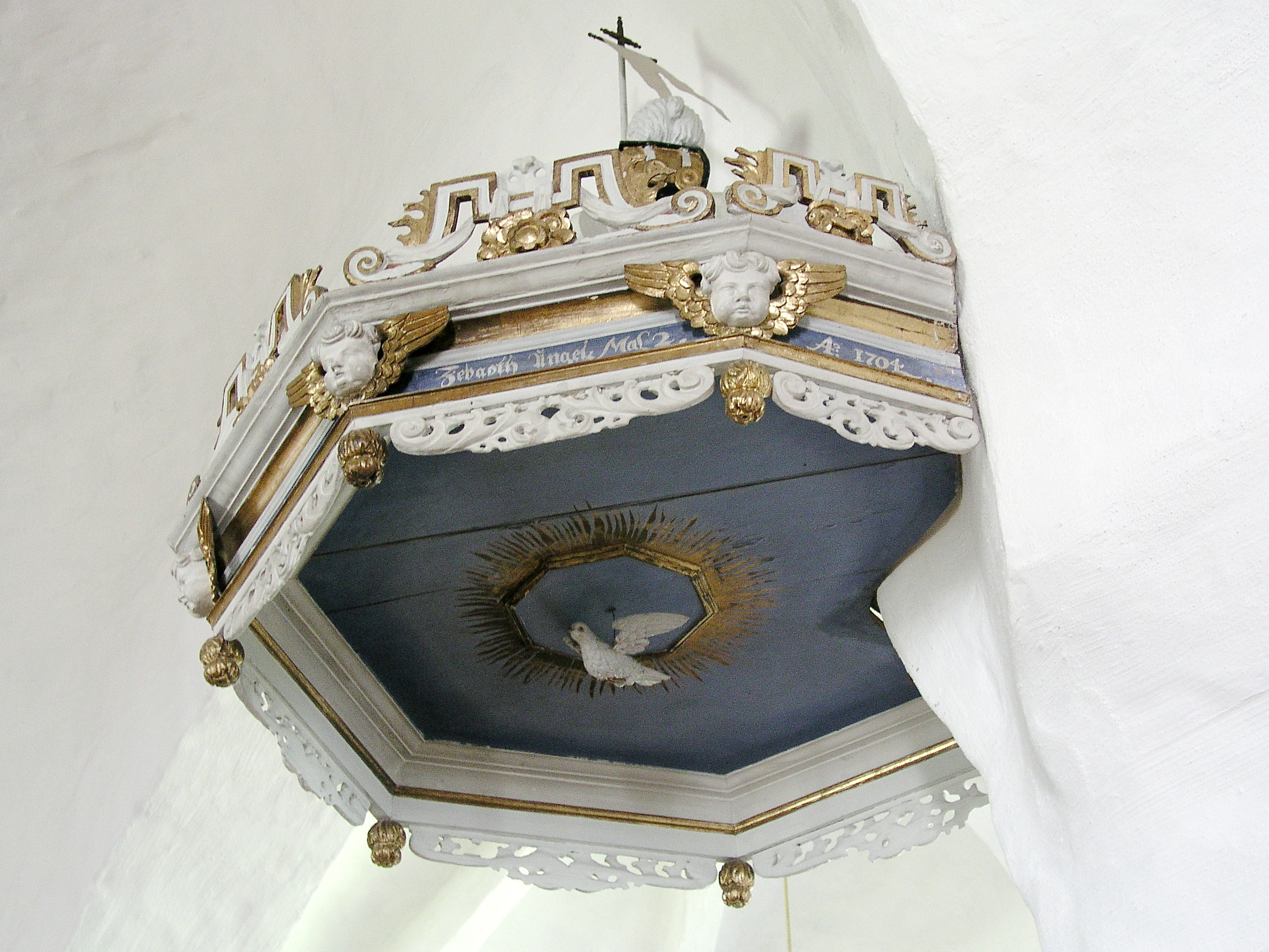
Pulpit canopy

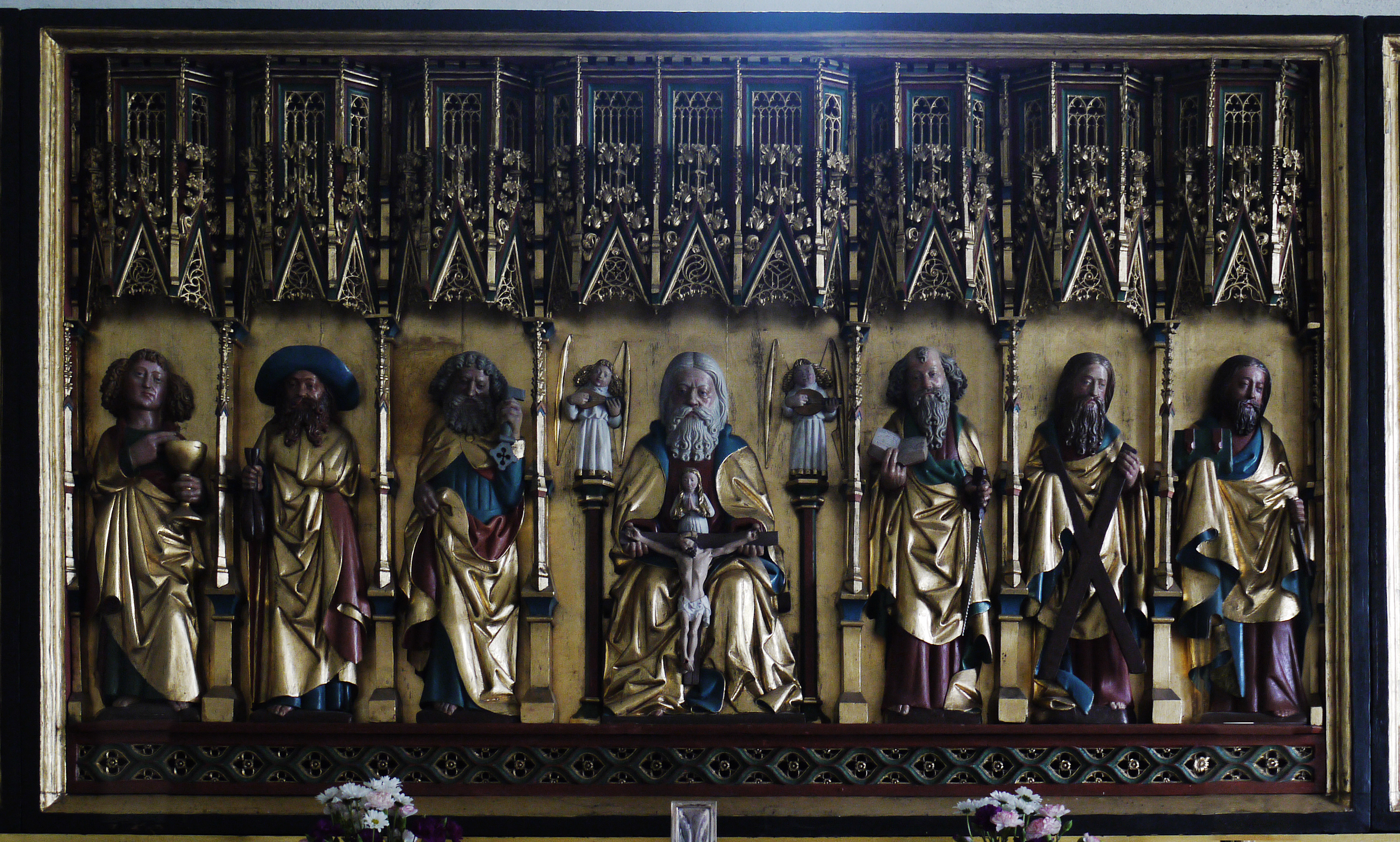
Detail of triptych

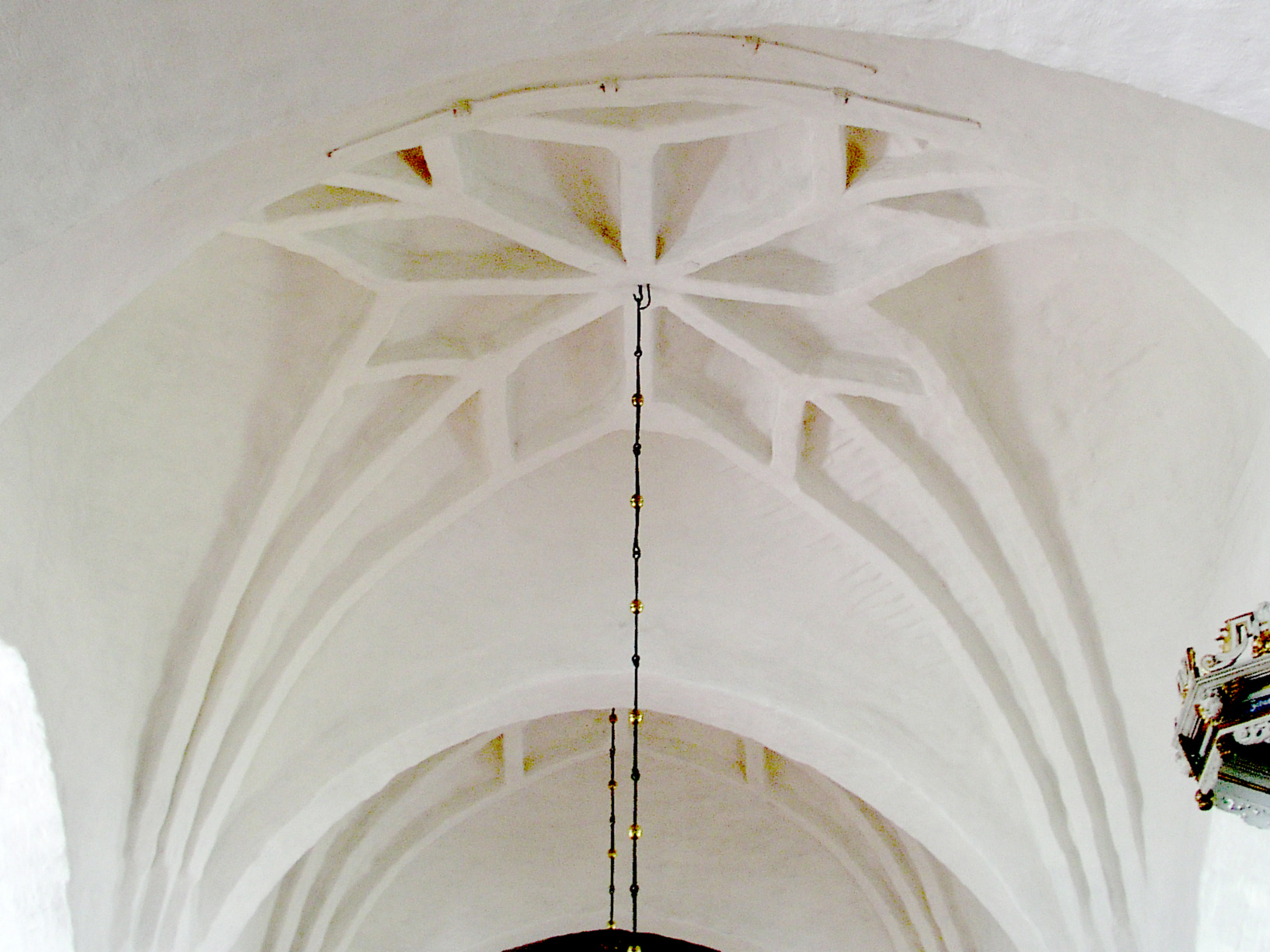
Ceiling vault
