= Mikael Hansson =

Swedish footballer

Personal information
- Full name: James Anders Mikael Hansson Finér
- Date of birth: 15 March 1968 (age 58)
- Place of birth: Norrköping, Sweden
- Position: Right-back

Senior career*
Years	Team	Apps	(Gls)
1988–1989	Söderköpings IK	40	(7)
1990–1999	IFK Norrköping	204	(19)
1999–2001	Stoke City	65	(2)
Total		309	(28)

International career
1995–1996	Sweden B	2	(0)
1994	Sweden	1	(0)
- * Club domestic league appearances and goals

James Anders Mikael "Gädda" Hansson Finér (born 15 March 1968) is a Swedish former professional footballer who played as a right-back. He represented Söderköpings IK, IFK Norrköping, and Stoke City during a career that spanned between 1988 and 2001. He won one cap for the Sweden national team in 1994.

== Career ==
Hansson was born in Norrköping and played for Söderköpings IK and his home team IFK Norrköping. He spent nine years at Idrottsparken in which time he won the Allsvenskan title with in 1992 as he made 206 appearances scoring 19 goals in Sweden's top flight. In November 1999 he left for English third-tier club Stoke City where he became a popular player with the club's supporters.

He impressed as a speedy right back and in his first season with the club he helped them to win the Football League Trophy and reach the play-offs, losing out to Gillingham. During the 2000–01 season Hansson again helped Stoke reach the play-off but Walsall proved to be too strong. He scored his only two league goals for Stoke against Bristol Rovers on 31 March 2001. Hanson's Stoke career was ended after he picked up an ankle injury in the summer of 2001 and he was never able to recover and so decided to retire from playing football.

== Career statistics ==
=== Club ===
Appearances and goals by club, season and competition
Club	Season	League			National cup		League cup		Other		Total	
Club	Season	Division	Apps	Goals	Apps	Goals	Apps	Goals	Apps	Goals	Apps	Goals
Söderköpings IK	1988	Swedish Division 3	21	3			—		—		21	3
Söderköpings IK	1989	Swedish Division 3	19	4			—		—		19	4
Söderköpings IK	Total		40	7			0	0	0	0	40	7
IFK Norrköping	1990	Allsvenskan	1	0			—		—		1	0
IFK Norrköping	1991	Allsvenskan	19	4			—		—		19	4
IFK Norrköping	1992	Allsvenskan	18	6			—		—		18	6
IFK Norrköping	1993	Allsvenskan	25	1			—		—		25	1
IFK Norrköping	1994	Allsvenskan	24	2			—		—		24	2
IFK Norrköping	1995	Allsvenskan	26	2			—		—		26	2
IFK Norrköping	1996	Allsvenskan	25	0			—		—		25	0
IFK Norrköping	1997	Allsvenskan	20	0			—		—		20	0
IFK Norrköping	1998	Allsvenskan	25	3			—		—		25	3
IFK Norrköping	1999	Allsvenskan	21	1			—		—		21	1
IFK Norrköping	Total		204	19			0	0	0	0	204	19
Stoke City	1999–2000	Second Division	27	0	0	0	0	0	9 (Note: Seven Appearances and one goal in Football League Trophy and two appearances in Second Division play-offs)	1	36	1
Stoke City	2000–01	Second Division	38	2	2	0	4	0	3 (Note: Two Appearances in Football League Trophy and one appearance in Second Division play-offs)	0	47	2
Stoke City	Total		65	2	2	0	4	0	12	1	83	3
Career total			309	28	2	0	4	0	12	1	327	29

=== International ===
Appearances and goals by national team and year
National team	Year	Apps	Goals
Sweden	1994	1	0
Total		1	0

== Honours ==
IFK Norrköping

- Allsvenskan: 1992
- Svenska Cupen: 1990–91, 1993–94

Stoke City

- Football League Trophy: 1999–2000
