= Marc Goodfellow =

English footballer (born 1981)

Personal information
- Full name: Marc David Goodfellow
- Date of birth: 20 September 1981 (age 45)
- Place of birth: Swadlincote, England
- Height: 5 ft 8 in (1.73 m)
- Position: Left winger

Youth career
- 1998–2000: Stoke City

Senior career*
Years	Team	Apps	(Gls)
2000–2004	Stoke City	55	(6)
2001	→ ÍBV Vestmannaeyja (loan)	5	(0)
2004–2005	Bristol City	22	(5)
2004	→ Port Vale (loan)	4	(0)
2004	→ Swansea City (loan)	6	(3)
2005	→ Colchester United (loan)	5	(1)
2005–2006	Swansea City	11	(0)
2006	Grimsby Town	11	(1)
2006	Bury	4	(0)
2007–2010	Burton Albion	71	(11)
2009–2010	→ Barrow (loan)	2	(1)
2010	→ Kidderminster Harriers (loan)	10	(0)
2010–2011	Barrow	19	(1)
2011–2013	Gresley		
2013–2014	King's Lynn Town	10	(2)
2014	Worksop Town		
2014	Mickleover Sports		
2014–2015	Basford United		
2015	Gresley		
Total		235	(31)
- * Club domestic league appearances and goals

Marc David Goodfellow (born 20 September 1981) is an English former footballer who played as a left-sided winger.

He began his career with Stoke City in 2000 and played in Iceland with ÍBV the following year. He transferred to Bristol City in 2004, who in turn sent him out on loan to Port Vale, Swansea City, and Colchester United. In 2005, he joined Swansea City before signing with Bury via Grimsby Town the following year. He was with Burton Albion between 2007 and 2010, helping the "Brewers" to the Conference National title in 2008–09. He also played on loan for both Barrow and Kidderminster Harriers. He switched to Barrow permanently in 2010, spending one season with the club before he joined Gresley in 2011. In his first season with the "Moatmen", he helped the club to win the Midland Football Alliance title. He joined King's Lynn Town in November 2013 before joining Worksop Town in January 2014 and then Mickleover Sports two months later. He joined Basford United in June 2014, helping the side to the Midland Football League title in 2014–15.

== Playing career ==
Marc started his playing career with Stoke City in 2000; the following year, he found himself in Iceland with ÍBV Vestmannaeyjar, the Icelandic connection with the Potteries club being strong at the time with Stoke being owned by an Icelandic consortium. Upon his return, he managed to appear fairly regular for the "Potters", as he played twelve games in his debut season.

He began to make his mark in the 2001–02 campaign, putting in 29 appearances across all competitions. He did not play in the club's Second Division play-off final success, though he did make 20 First Division appearances in the subsequent 2002–03 season.

He made only a handful of appearances at the Britannia Stadium in 2003–04. However, he earned a £50,000 move to Bristol City in the January transfer window. He played in the play-off final defeat to Brighton & Hove Albion, replacing defender Tony Butler on 88 minutes as manager Danny Wilson made a late attempt to save the game. He did not feature heavily at Ashton Gate and instead was loaned out to Port Vale in October 2004. The next month Swansea City manager Kenny Jackett was on the lookout for a quality winger, Goodfellow meanwhile was prepared to go out on loan to the League Two club. Jackett managed to persuade City to allow Goodfellow to join the "Swans" on loan. He impressed at the Welsh club and his loan spell was extended the following month. However, he was quickly recalled to Ashton Gate after a spate of injuries at the Bristol club. Soon after Swansea attempted to buy Goodfellow off City, however, City manager Brian Tinnion informed Goodfellow he still had a future at the club. Tinnion was expecting at least what they paid Stoke for him and Swansea were unable to comply. In March 2005 he joined Colchester United on loan until the end of the season and scored once against Peterborough United.

In May 2005, Swansea again admitted their interest in the young winger, and the following month they finally got their man, ending months of speculation. Goodfellow said he was delighted with the move and that his "heart was always set on Swansea". His 13 appearances proved to be something of an anti-climax. So Goodfellow left Swansea, now in League One, to join Grimsby Town in February 2006. He played for the "Mariners" in the 2006 Football League Two play-off final at the Millennium Stadium, which ended in a 1–0 defeat to Cheltenham Town. He scored once during his spell at Grimsby in a 1–1 draw with Shrewsbury Town.

In the summer of 2006 Goodfellow joined Bury on a free transfer, before leaving in November 2006. He dropped out of the English Football League to sign for Conference National side Burton Albion in January 2007. He made 36 appearances in the 2007–08 season, helping them to a fifth-place finish. The 2008–09 would prove much more successful, as Goodfellow made 29 league appearances to help Burton finish as Conference champions, and therefore win promotion into the Football League.

In November 2009, Goodfellow returned to the Conference, signing with Barrow on a month-long loan. He made just two appearances for the club. On transfer-deadline day, he joined Kidderminster Harriers on loan for the rest of the season. He was released from Burton at the end of the 2009–10 season and returned to Barrow for the following season. After 19 appearances in 2010–11, he was released by Barrow in May 2011. Goodfellow joined Midland Football Alliance side Gresley in August 2011. He helped the "Moatmen" to the league title in 2011–12. Gresley finished 11th in the Northern Premier League Division One South in 2012–13. He finished as top scorer with 14 league and six cup goals and also scored the club's Goal of the Season against Ilkeston Town in the FA Cup.

In November 2013 Goodfellow moved up a division to join King's Lynn Town. He stayed at King's Lynn for two months before joining Worksop Town on 2 January 2014. On 28 March 2014 Goodfellow moved to Mickleover Sports. Mickleover finished the 2013–14 season in the play-off places, but were beaten by Belper Town in the play-off final. In June 2014, Goodfellow joined Nottingham side Basford United. United won the Midland League in 2014–15.

== Coaching career ==
Goodfellow returned to former club Gresley Rovers as coach of the under-15s side, and also served as first-team assistant manager from November 2024 until stepping down due to health issues in March 2025.

== Career statistics ==
Appearances and goals by club, season and competition
Club	Season	League			National cup (Note: Includes FA Cup, Icelandic Football Cup)		League cup (Note: Includes Football League Cup, Icelandic Football League Cup)		Other		Total	
Club	Season	Division	Apps	Goals	Apps	Goals	Apps	Goals	Apps	Goals	Apps	Goals
Stoke City	2000–01	Second Division	7	0	1	0	2	1	2 (Note: Appearance(s) in the EFL Trophy.)	1	12	2
Stoke City	2001–02	Second Division	24	5	3	0	1	0	1	0	29	5
Stoke City	2002–03	First Division	20	1	3	0	1	0	—		24	1
Stoke City	2003–04	First Division	4	0	0	0	2	1	—		6	1
Stoke City	Total		55	6	7	0	6	2	3	1	71	9
ÍBV (loan)	2001	Úrvalsdeild	5	0	2	1	—		—		7	1
Bristol City	2003–04	Second Division	17	5	—		—		—		17	5
Bristol City	2004–05	League One	5	0	0	0	0	0	0	0	5	0
Bristol City	Total		22	5	0	0	0	0	0	0	22	5
Port Vale (loan)	2004–05	League One	4	0	0	0	—		0	0	4	0
Swansea City (loan)	2004–05	League Two	6	3	2	1	0	0	0	0	8	4
Colchester United (loan)	2004–05	League One	5	1	0	0	0	0	0	0	5	1
Swansea City	2005–06	League One	11	0	0	0	0	0	2	0	13	0
Grimsby Town	2005–06	League Two	11	1	—		—		0	0	11	1
Bury	2006–07	League Two	4	0	0	0	1	0	1	0	6	0
Burton Albion	2006–07	Conference National	5	1	0	0	—		0	0	5	1
Burton Albion	2007–08	Conference National	34	4	2	0	—		0	0	36	4
Burton Albion	2008–09	Conference National	29	6	0	0	—		2 (Note: Appearance(s) in the FA Trophy.)	1	31	7
Burton Albion	2009–10	League Two	3	0	0	0	0	0	1	0	4	0
Burton Albion	Total		71	11	2	0	0	0	3	1	76	12
Barrow (loan)	2009–10	Conference National	2	1	3	1	—		0	0	5	2
Kidderminster Harriers (loan)	2009–10	Conference National	10	0	0	0	—		0	0	10	0
Barrow	2010–11	Conference National	19	1	0	0	—		0	0	19	1
King's Lynn Town	2013–14	Northern Premier League; Premier Division	10	2	0	0	—		2	1	12	3
Career total (Note: Statistics for Gresley, Worksop Town, Mickleover Sports, Basford United and Gresley not recorded.)			235	31	16	3	7	2	11	3	269	39

== Honours ==
Burton Albion

- Conference National: 2008–09

Gresley

- Midland Football Alliance: 2011–12

Basford United

- Midland Football League: 2014–15
