= Söderköping =

Place in Östergötland, Sweden

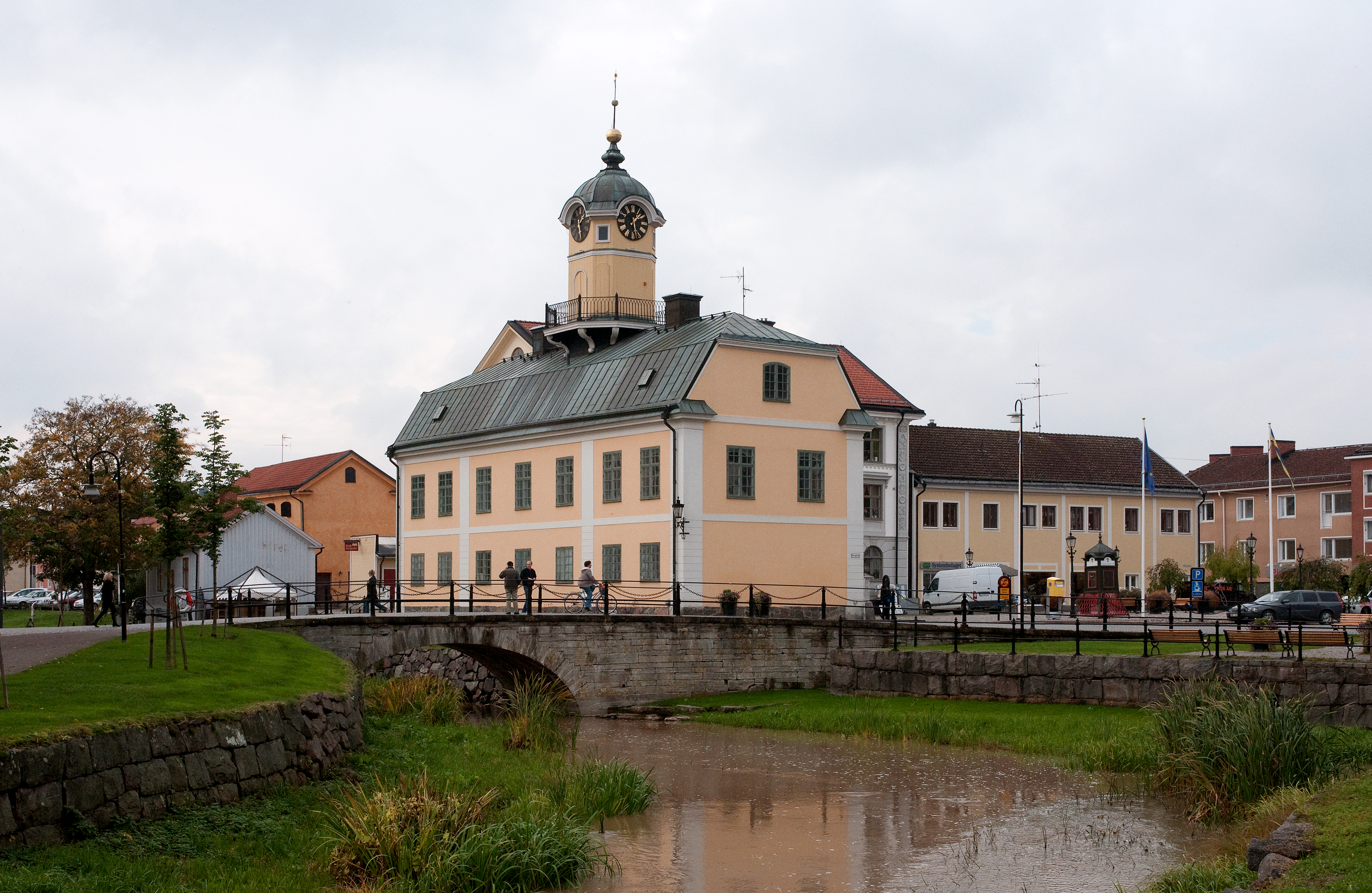

- Location within Östergötland Location within Sweden
- Coordinates: 58°29′N 16°19′E
- Country: Sweden
- Province: Östergötland
- County: Östergötland County
- Municipality: Söderköping Municipality

Area
  - Total: 4.02 km^{2} (1.55 sq mi)

Population (31 December 2010)
  - Total: 6,992
  - Density: 1,738/km^{2} (4,500/sq mi)
- Time zone: UTC+1 (CET)
  - Summer (DST): UTC+2 (CEST)

Söderköping is a locality and the seat of Söderköping Municipality, Östergötland County, Sweden with 6,992 inhabitants in 2010. Söderköping is, despite its small population, for historical reasons normally still referred to as a town. Statistics Sweden, however, only counts localities with more than 10,000 inhabitants as towns. Söderköping is about 15 km southeast of the city of Norrköping.

== History ==
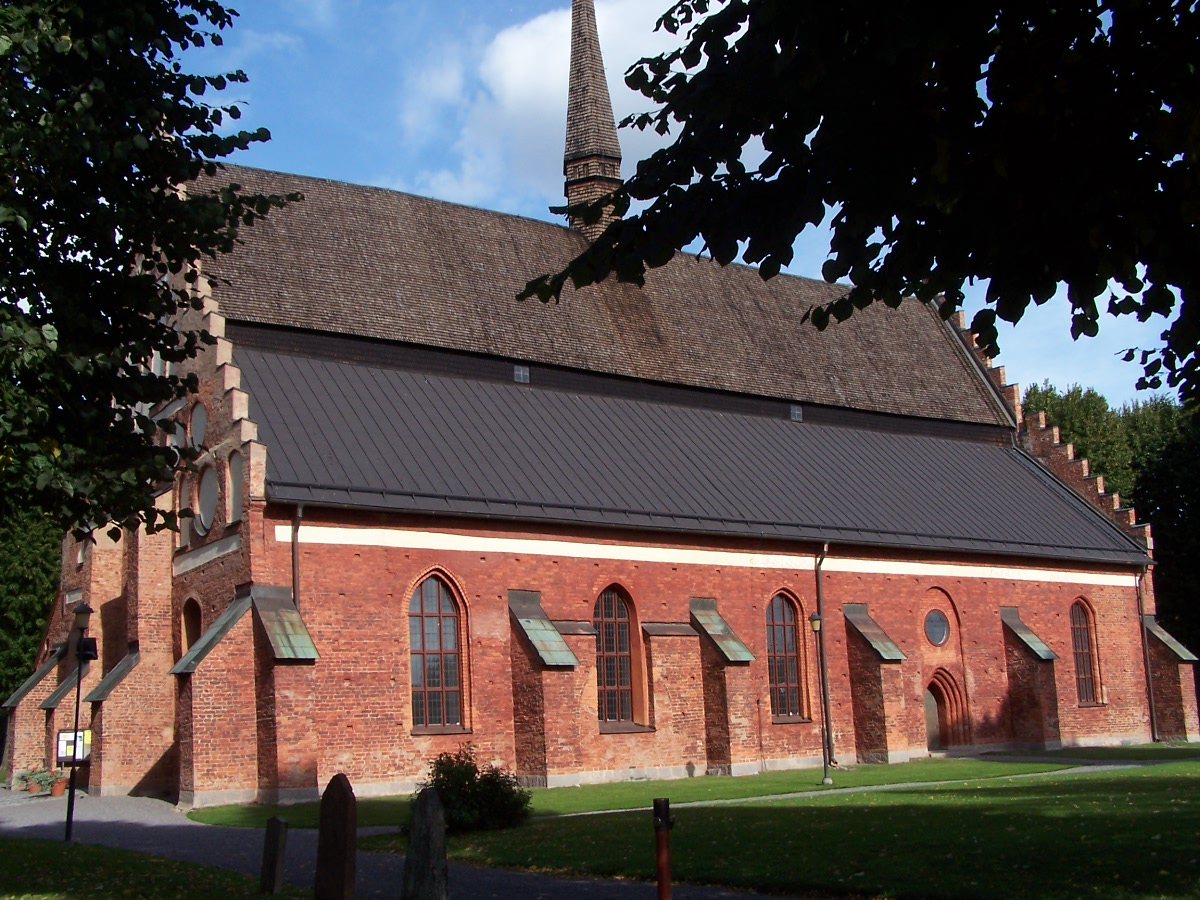
The Church of St. Lawrence is one of two remaining medieval churches in Söderköping, and was the venue for two royal coronations during the Middle Ages.

Sigismund III Vasa became king of both Sweden and the Polish–Lithuanian Commonwealth in a personal union upon his election to the Swedish throne in 1592 amidst much controversy and religious strife. The Protestant Reformation and Catholic Counter-Reformation were in full swing and at odds everywhere in Europe in the day. Subsequently, in 1593, he signed an agreement to guarantee religious freedom to the Protestant majority of Sweden and to pacify the Protestant concerns overall by all sects and the religion-generated unrest in the country settled down for a time once the agreement was in place, but it came to rise refreshed and stronger in 1594 because of Sigismund's actions.

In 1595 the Riksdag of the Estates assembled at Söderköping (consequently sometimes known as the Riksdag of Söderköping) and elected Duke Charles IX of Sweden as regent of Sweden in place of his Catholic nephew Sigismund—though it did not formally depose Sigismund—because he had violated his agreement as king-elect and that of 1593 with the Uppsala Synod and had instead championed Catholic Counter-Reformation measures, appointed Catholics to high offices and established catholic schools during this religiously volatile era—all in violation of his agreement with the Synod in 1593. The renewed controversy came to a head in 1594, resulting in the Riksdag setting aside his authority, and the whole history of Sigismund with his claim on the Swedish throne became a succession of trigger events leading to the subsequent seven decades of dynastic warfare known as the Polish–Swedish wars. He was formally deposed by the Riksens ständer at Linköping, 24 February 1600, which declared he had abdicated his throne. The same Riksdag approved the execution of eight of Charles IX's opponents in the Swedish nobility as allies of King Sigismund.

In the early middle-ages it was the most important port in Sweden at the confluence of the Storån and Lillån rivers trading mainly with Lubeck, principally in salt, textiles, butter and beer. Silting eventually led to its demise as a trading centre. Söderköping stands at the eastern end of the Göta Canal, a 390-km long canal opened in 1832 to connect Gothenburg to the Baltic Sea by inland waterway.

== Sights ==
Two churches built in the early 13th century are located near the city center, St. Lawrence's Church and Drothem Church.

Today Söderköping is visited by foreign tourists taking boat tours of the Göta Kanal and is a popular destination for residents of the area. An ice cream shop on the banks of Göta Kanal, Smultronstället, is a well-known attraction. Many adventurers gather in Söderköping as several climbing routes are right in the city centre and the archipelago is just a few miles away. In autumn every year is Söderköpings gästabud arranged, a medieval festival.

== See also ==
- Söderköping Process
