= Henrik Risom =

Danish footballer (born 1968)

Personal information
- Date of birth: 24 July 1968 (age 58)
- Place of birth: Vildbjerg, Denmark
- Height: 1.80 m (5 ft 11 in)
- Position: Midfielder

Youth career
- Vildbjerg SF

Senior career*
Years	Team	Apps	(Gls)
1986–1990	Vejle	110	(10)
1991–1994	Lyngby	89	(11)
1994–1995	Dynamo Dresden	15	(0)
1995–1996	Odense	18	(0)
1996–1997	Silkeborg IF	44	(6)
1998–2000	Vejle	77	(9)
2000–2001	Stoke City	25	(0)
2001–2003	Aarhus GF	56	(6)
Total		434	(43)

International career
1989–1992	Denmark	9	(0)
- * Club domestic league appearances and goals

Henrik Risom (born 24 July 1968) is a Danish former footballer who played as a midfielder for Vejle, Lyngby, Dynamo Dresden, Odense, Silkeborg IF, Stoke City and Aarhus GF.

== Career ==
Risom was born in Vildbjerg and began his senior career with Vejle. After four years at Vejle where he played over 100 games he moved on to Lyngby. Three years there then saw him spend one and a half season spell with German side Dynamo Dresden where he played in 15 Bundesliga matches. He returned to Danish football with Odense and Silkeborg IF and had two more years with Vejle. He joined English club Stoke City in August 2000 and joined up with a number of Scandinavian players. He played 24 times for Stoke in 2000–01 before returning to Denmark with Aarhus GF with whom he finished his career with.

During his career, Risom played nine matches for the Denmark national team.

== Career statistics ==
Appearances and goals by club, season and competition
Club	Season	League			National cup		League cup		Other		Total	
Club	Season	Division	Apps	Goals	Apps	Goals	Apps	Goals	Apps	Goals	Apps	Goals
Vejle	1986	Danish 1st Division	8	0	—		—		—		8	0
Vejle	1987	Danish 1st Division	26	6	—		—		—		26	6
Vejle	1988	Danish 1st Division	25	4	—		—		—		25	4
Vejle	1989	Danish 1st Division	26	0	—		—		—		26	0
Vejle	1990	Danish 1st Division	25	0	—		—		—		25	0
Vejle	Total		110	10	0	0	0	0	0	0	110	10
Lyngby	1991–92	Danish Superliga	45	4	—		—		—		45	4
Lyngby	1992–93	Danish Superliga	31	5	—		—		—		31	5
Lyngby	1993–94	Danish Superliga	13	3	—		—		—		13	3
Lyngby	Total		89	12	0	0	0	0	0	0	89	12
Dynamo Dresden	1993–94	Bundesliga	11	0	—		—		—		11	0
Dynamo Dresden	1994–95	Bundesliga	4	0	—		—		—		4	0
Dynamo Dresden	Total		15	0	0	0	0	0	0	0	15	0
Odense	1994–95	Danish Superliga	12	0	—		—		—		12	0
Odense	1995–96	Danish Superliga	6	0	—		—		—		6	0
Odense	Total		18	0	0	0	0	0	0	0	18	0
Silkeborg IF	1995–96	Danish Superliga	14	3	—		—		—		14	3
Silkeborg IF	1996–97	Danish Superliga	15	2	—		—		—		15	2
Silkeborg IF	1997–98	Danish Superliga	15	1	—		—		—		15	1
Silkeborg IF	Total		44	6	0	0	0	0	0	0	44	6
Vejle	1997–98	Danish Superliga	14	0	—		—		—		14	0
Vejle	1998–99	Danish Superliga	31	4	—		—		—		31	4
Vejle	1999–2000	Danish Superliga	32	5	—		—		—		32	5
Vejle	Total		77	9	0	0	0	0	0	0	77	9
Stoke City	2000–01	Second Division	25	0	1	0	4	0	4	0	34	0
AGF	2001–02	Danish Superliga	32	2	—		—		—		32	2
AGF	2002–03	Danish Superliga	24	4	—		—		—		24	4
AGF	Total		56	6	0	0	0	0	0	0	56	6
Career total			434	43	1	0	4	0	4	0	443	43

=== International ===
Appearances and goals by national team and year
National team	Year	Apps	Goals
Denmark	1989	4	0
Denmark	1990	4	0
Denmark	1992	1	0
Total		9	0

== Honours ==
Silkeborg

- UEFA Intertoto Cup: 1996
