= Stefán Þórðarson =

Icelandic footballer (born 1975)

Stefan Thordarson
Personal information
- Full name: Stefán Þór Þórðarson
- Date of birth: 27 March 1975 (age 51)
- Place of birth: Akranes, Iceland
- Position: Forward

Youth career
- 1990–1993: IA Akranes

Senior career*
| Years | Team | Apps | (Gls) |
| 1994–1996 | ÍA Akranes | 31 | (8) |
| 1997 | Östers IF | 18 | (6) |
| 1998 | SK Brann | 2 | (0) |
| 1998 | Östers IF | 17 | (3) |
| 1999 | Kongsvinger IL | 6 | (0) |
| 1999 | ÍA Akranes | 7 | (4) |
| 1999–2000 | KFC Uerdingen | 25 | (6) |
| 2000–2002 | Stoke City | 51 | (8) |
| 2003–2004 | ÍA Akranes | 30 | (9) |
| 2005–2007 | IFK Norrköping | 75 | (23) |
| 2008 | ÍA Akranes | 17 | (3) |
| 2009 | FC Vaduz | 12 | (1) |
| 2009 | IFK Norrköping | 12 | (4) |
| 2010–2011 | ÍA Akranes | 23 | (6) |
| Total | | 326 | (81) |

International career
| 1995–1996 | Iceland U21 | 8 | (3) |
| 1998–2008 | Iceland | 6 | (1) |
- * Club domestic league appearances and goals

Stefán Þór Þórðarson (Anglicised Stefan Thor Thordarson; born 27 March 1975) is an Icelandic former professional footballer who played as a forward for ÍA Akranes, Östers IF, SK Brann, Kongsvinger IL, KFC Uerdingen, Stoke City, IFK Norrköping and FC Vaduz as well as the Iceland national team.

== Career ==
Stefán was born in Akranes and began his career with local side ÍA Akranes. After four years at Akranesvöllur he moved to Swedish football with Östers IF. After scoring six goal in 18 Allsvenskan matches he moved to Norway with SK Brann. However he made just two appearances with Brann and moved back to Östers. He tried Norwegian football again with Kongsvinger IL playing in six matches without scoring he moved to Germany to play for KFC Uerdingen. He spent the 1999–2000 season with Uerdingen before moving to English club Stoke City in the summer of 2000.

He joined up with a number of fellow Icelandic players at Stoke and he made a fine start scoring the winning goal against Liverpool in a pre-season friendly. His form carried on into the season as he scored against Reading, Peterborough United and Oxford United and twice against Premier League Charlton Athletic in the League Cup one of which was a 30-yard strike. He only scored once more for the remainder of the 2000–01 as Stoke lost to Walsall in the play-offs. He found himself in and out of the side in 2001–02 which saw him play in 22 matches, 18 of which came from the bench and he scored four goals. He was released by Stoke at the end of the season and moved back to Iceland to play for ÍA Akranes.

He then played back in Sweden with IFK Norrköping before a third spell with ÍA Akranes. In 2009, he moved to Liechtenstein club FC Vaduz before ending his career with returns to Norrköping and ÍA.

== International ==
Stefán has won 6 caps for Iceland and scored on his national team debut against South Africa in 1998. He has also played 8 games for the Under 21 team.

== Career statistics ==
=== Club ===
Appearances and goals by club, season and competition
| Club | Season | League | | | National cup | | League cup | | Other | | Total | |
| Club | Season | Division | Apps | Goals | Apps | Goals | Apps | Goals | Apps | Goals | Apps | Goals |
|---|---|---|---|---|---|---|---|---|---|---|---|---|
| ÍA | 1994 | Úrvalsdeild | 6 | 0 | — | | — | | — | | 6 | 0 |
| ÍA | 1995 | Úrvalsdeild | 13 | 5 | — | | — | | — | | 13 | 5 |
| ÍA | 1996 | Úrvalsdeild | 12 | 3 | — | | — | | — | | 12 | 3 |
| Östers IF | 1997 | Allsvenskan | 18 | 6 | — | | — | | — | | 18 | 6 |
| Brann | 1998 | Tippeligaen | 2 | 0 | — | | — | | — | | 2 | 0 |
| Östers IF | 1998 | Allsvenskan | 17 | 3 | — | | — | | — | | 17 | 3 |
| Kongsvinger IL | 1999 | Tippeligaen | 6 | 0 | — | | — | | — | | 6 | 0 |
| KFC Uerdingen 05 | 1999–2000 | Regionalliga West/Südwest | 25 | 6 | — | | — | | — | | 25 | 6 |
| Stoke City | 2000–01 | Second Division | 30 | 4 | 2 | 0 | 6 | 2 | 5 | 1 | 43 | 7 |
| Stoke City | 2001–02 | Second Division | 21 | 4 | 0 | 0 | 1 | 0 | 0 | 0 | 22 | 4 |
| ÍA | 2003 | Úrvalsdeild | 15 | 7 | — | | — | | — | | 15 | 7 |
| ÍA | 2004 | Úrvalsdeild | 15 | 2 | — | | — | | — | | 15 | 2 |
| IFK Norrköping | 2005 | Superettan | 25 | 1 | — | | — | | — | | 25 | 1 |
| IFK Norrköping | 2006 | Superettan | 26 | 12 | — | | — | | — | | 26 | 12 |
| IFK Norrköping | 2007 | Superettan | 24 | 10 | — | | — | | — | | 24 | 10 |
| ÍA | 2008 | Úrvalsdeild | 17 | 3 | — | | — | | — | | 17 | 3 |
| FC Vaduz | 2008–09 | Swiss Super League | 12 | 1 | — | | — | | — | | 12 | 1 |
| IFK Norrköping | 2009 | Superettan | 12 | 4 | — | | — | | — | | 12 | 4 |
| ÍA | 2010 | 1. deild karla | 8 | 2 | — | | — | | — | | 8 | 2 |
| ÍA | 2011 | 1. deild karla | 15 | 4 | — | | — | | — | | 15 | 4 |
| Career total | | | 319 | 77 | 2 | 0 | 7 | 2 | 5 | 1 | 333 | 80 |

=== International ===
Appearances and goals by national team and year
| National team | Year | Apps | Goals |
|---|---|---|---|
| Iceland | 1998 | 4 | 1 |
| Iceland | 1999 | 1 | 0 |
| Iceland | 2008 | 1 | 0 |
| Total | | 6 | 1 |
