= 1986 UEFA Cup final =

- Event: 1985–86 UEFA Cup
| Real Madrid | 1. FC Köln |
| (Spain) | (West Germany) |
| 5 | 3 |
- on aggregate

First leg
| Real Madrid | 1. FC Köln |
| 5 | 1 |
- Date: 30 April 1986
- Venue: Santiago Bernabéu, Madrid
- Referee: George Courtney (England)
- Attendance: 85,000

Second leg
| 1. FC Köln | Real Madrid |
| 2 | 0 |
- Date: 6 May 1986
- Venue: Olympiastadion, Berlin
- Referee: Bob Valentine (Scotland)
- Attendance: 21,185

The 1986 UEFA Cup Final was an association football tie played on 30 April and 6 May 1986 between Real Madrid of Spain and Köln of West Germany. Madrid won 5–3 on aggregate and, in doing so, successfully defended their title from the year prior. They also became the first team to win two consecutive UEFA Cup titles.

== Route to the final ==
En route to reaching the final, both Real Madrid and FC Köln benefitted from performing extremely well at home. In the first five rounds of the competition, Los Blancos had won all five home legs, outscoring opponents by a total of 19 goals to 2 in games played at the Bernabéu in Madrid. Köln was also dominant in their home fixtures–– throughout the entire competition, the West German side conceded only one goal whilst playing as the home team.

In the third round, Real Madrid achieved a shocking comeback against two-time champions Borussia Mönchengladbach. After being crushed by Gladbach in the away leg by a score of 5–1, Real stormed back to win the return leg 4–0, thus advancing on away goals. This is still regarded as one of the greatest comebacks in the history of European continental football.

This was also the second consecutive year that Real Madrid eliminated Inter Milan in the semi-finals of the UEFA Cup.

| Real Madrid | | | | Round | 1. FC Köln | | | |
|---|---|---|---|---|---|---|---|---|
| Opponent | Agg. | 1st leg | 2nd leg | | Opponent | Agg. | 1st leg | 2nd leg |
| (Greece) AEK Athens | 5–1 | 0–1 (A) | 5–0 (H) | First round | (Spain) Sporting Gijón | 2–1 | 0–0 (H) | 2–1 (A) |
| (Soviet Union) Chornomorets Odesa | 2–1 | 2–1 (H) | 0–0 (A) | Second round | (Czechoslovakia) Bohemians Praha | 8–2 | 4–0 (H) | 4–2 (A) |
| (West Germany) Borussia Mönchengladbach | 5–5 (a) | 1–5 (A) | 4–0 (H) | Third round | (Sweden) Hammarby | 4–3 | 1–2 (A) | 3–1 (H) |
| (Switzerland) Neuchâtel Xamax | 3–2 | 3–0 (H) | 0–2 (A) | Quarter-finals | (Portugal) Sporting CP | 3–1 | 1–1 (A) | 2–0 (H) |
| (Italy) Internazionale | 6–4 (a.e.t.) | 1–3 (A) | 5–1 (a.e.t.) (H) | Semi-finals | (Belgium) K.S.V. Waregem | 7–3 | 4–0 (H) | 3–3 (A) |

== Match details ==
=== First leg ===
30 April 1986

| Real Madrid (Spain) | 5–1 | (West Germany) 1. FC Köln |
|---|---|---|
| Sánchez 38'; Gordillo 42'; Valdano 51', 84'; Santillana 89' | Report; Overview (archive) | Allofs 29' |

Santiago Bernabéu, Madrid
Attendance: 85,000
Referee: George Courtney (England)

| Real Madrid | Köln |

| GK | 1 | (Spain) Agustín |
| RB | 4 | (Spain) José Antonio Salguero |
| CB | 3 | (Spain) José Antonio Camacho (c) |
| LB | 2 | (Spain) Jesús Solana |
| RM | 10 | (Spain) Rafael Martín Vázquez | (substituted off) 81' |
| CM | 7 | (Spain) Juanito |
| CM | 5 | (Spain) Míchel |
| LM | 6 | (Spain) Rafael Gordillo |
| RF | 8 | (Spain) Emilio Butragueño |
| CF | 9 | (Mexico) Hugo Sánchez |
| LF | 11 | (Argentina) Jorge Valdano |
Substitutes:
| CF | 15 | (Spain) Santillana | (substituted on) 81' |
Manager:
(Spain) Luis Molowny

| GK | 1 | (West Germany) Harald Schumacher |
| SW | 4 | (West Germany) Andreas Gielchen |
| DF | 3 | (West Germany) Karlheinz Geils |
| DF | 5 | (West Germany) Paul Steiner |
| DF | 2 | (West Germany) Dieter Prestin |
| MF | 6 | (West Germany) Ralf Geilenkirchen |
| MF | 8 | (West Germany) Mathias Hönerbach |
| MF | 9 | (West Germany) Uwe Bein | (substituted off) 70' |
| MF | 10 | (West Germany) Olaf Janßen |
| FW | 7 | (West Germany) Pierre Littbarski | (substituted off) 83' |
| FW | 11 | (West Germany) Klaus Allofs (c) |
Substitutes:
| MF | 15 | (West Germany) Thomas Häßler | (substituted on) 70' |
| FW | 14 | (West Germany) Norbert Dickel | (substituted on) 83' |
Manager:
(West Germany) Georg Keßler

=== Second leg ===
==== Scheduling changes ====
The second leg was originally scheduled for Thursday, 8 May, but was moved to Tuesday, 6 May, following a request by Real Madrid due to their domestic fixtures. Additionally, the match was played in Berlin instead of Cologne because of sanctions imposed by UEFA on Köln stipulating that they must play at least 350 km from their home stadium after trouble caused by supporters during the 2nd leg of the semi-final against Waregem.

==== Result ====
Like Real Madrid had in the earlier stages of the competition, Köln went into the second leg 5–1 down. However, Die Geißböcke were unable to replicate Real's successful third-round comeback against Mönchengladbach. Though Köln won the match 2–0 at home, it was not enough, and Real were crowned champions for the second successive year.

6 May 1986

| 1. FC Köln (West Germany) | 2–0 | (Spain) Real Madrid |
|---|---|---|
| Bein 22'; Geilenkirchen 72' | Report; Overview (archive) |

Olympiastadion, West Berlin
Attendance: 21,185
Referee: Bob Valentine (Scotland)

| Köln | Real Madrid |

| GK | 1 | (West Germany) Harald Schumacher |
| SW | 4 | (West Germany) Andreas Gielchen |
| DF | 2 | (West Germany) Dieter Prestin |
| DF | 5 | (West Germany) Paul Steiner | (yellow card) 74' |
| MF | 3 | (West Germany) Karlheinz Geils | (yellow card) 8' | (substituted off) 83' |
| MF | 6 | (West Germany) Ralf Geilenkirchen |
| MF | 8 | (West Germany) Mathias Hönerbach | (yellow card) 18' |
| MF | 9 | (West Germany) Uwe Bein |
| MF | 10 | (West Germany) Olaf Janßen | | (substituted off) 58' |
| FW | 7 | (West Germany) Pierre Littbarski |
| FW | 11 | (West Germany) Klaus Allofs (c) |
Substitutes:
| DF | 12 | (Israel) David Pizanti | | (substituted on) 58' |
| MF | 13 | (West Germany) Robert Schmitz | | (substituted on) 83' |
Manager:
(West Germany) Georg Keßler

| GK | 1 | (Spain) Agustín |
| RB | 2 | (Spain) Chendo |
| CB | 4 | (Spain) Antonio Maceda |
| CB | 3 | (Spain) José Antonio Camacho (c) |
| LB | 5 | (Spain) Jesús Solana |
| RM | 8 | (Spain) Míchel | (yellow card) 81' |
| CM | 10 | (Spain) Ricardo Gallego |
| LM | 6 | (Spain) Rafael Gordillo |
| RF | 7 | (Spain) Emilio Butragueño | | (substituted off) 88' |
| CF | 9 | (Mexico) Hugo Sánchez | | (substituted off) 20' |
| LF | 11 | (Argentina) Jorge Valdano | (yellow card) 30' |
Substitutes:
| CF | 15 | (Spain) Santillana | | (substituted on) 20' |
| RF | 14 | (Spain) Juanito | | (substituted on) 88' |
Manager:
(Spain) Luis Molowny

== See also ==
- 1986 European Cup final
- 1986 European Cup Winners' Cup final
- 1. FC Köln in European football
- Real Madrid CF in international football competitions
- 1985–86 Real Madrid CF season
