= 1985–86 NK Hajduk Split season =

Hajduk Split
1985–86 season
- Chairman: Joško Vidošević
- Manager: Stanko Poklepović; Sergije Krešić
- First League: 4th
- Yugoslav Cup: Second round
- UEFA Cup: Quarter-finals
- Top goalscorer: League: Zlatko Vujović (17); All: Zlatko Vujović (25)
- Highest home attendance: 55,000 v Torino, 6 November 1985
- Lowest home attendance: 1,000 v Sutjeska, 1 March 1986

The 1985–86 season was the 75th season in Hajduk Split’s history and their 40th in the Yugoslav First League. Their 2nd place finish in the 1984–85 season meant it was their 40th successive season playing in the Yugoslav First League.

== Competitions ==
=== Overall ===
Competition	Started round	Final result	First match	Last Match
1985–86 Yugoslav First League	–	4th	11 August	29 June
1985–86 Yugoslav Cup	First round	Second round	30 October	20 November
1985–86 UEFA Cup	First round	Quarter-finals	18 September	19 March

=== Yugoslav First League ===
==== Classification ====
Pos	Team	Pld	W	D	L	GF	GA	GD	Pts	Qualification or relegation
2	Red Star Belgrade	34	21	7	6	73	38	+35	49	Qualification for European Cup first round
3	Velež	34	13	11	10	64	50	+14	37	Qualification for Cup Winners' Cup first round
4	Hajduk Split	34	15	7	12	55	44	+11	37	Qualification for UEFA Cup first round
5	Rijeka	34	12	13	9	42	31	+11	37	Qualification for UEFA Cup first round
6	Dinamo Zagreb	34	11	14	9	53	43	+10	36	

Source: rsssf.org
Rules for classification: 1) points; 2) goal difference; 3) number of goals scored.

==== Results summary ====
Overall								Home						Away					
Pld	W	D	L	GF	GA	GD	Pts	W	D	L	GF	GA	GD	W	D	L	GF	GA	GD
34	15	7	12	55	44	+11	52	14	2	1	44	14	+30	1	5	11	11	30	−19

==== Results by round ====
Round	1	2	3	4	5	6	7	8	9	10	11	12	13	14	15	16	17	18	19	20	21	22	23	24	25	26	27	28	29	30	31	32	33	34
Ground	A	H	A	H	A	H	A	H	A	H	A	H	A	H	A	H	A	H	A	H	A	H	A	H	A	H	A	H	A	H	A	H	A	H
Result	D	W	D	W	L	W	D	W	L	W	L	L	W	W	L	W	L	W	L	D	D	W	L	W	D	D	L	W	L	W	L	W	D	W
Position	9	5	10	7	12	7	5	4	4	4	6	10	8	5	5	5	6	4	7	6	6	4	4	4	4	4	5	4	6	5	7	4	5	4

Source: Competitive matches
A = Away; H = Home; W = Win; D = Draw; L = Loss

== Matches ==
=== Yugoslav First League ===
Round	Date	Venue	Opponent	Score	Attendance	Hajduk Scorers
1	11 Aug	A	Sutjeska	0 – 0	5,000	
2	18 Aug	H	Rijeka	1 – 0	16,000	Gudelj
3	21 Aug	A	Prishtina	0 – 1	27,000	
4	25 Aug	H	Dinamo Zagreb	1 – 0	35,000	Zl. Vujović
5	1 Sep	A	Sarajevo	0 – 2	12,000	
6	4 Sep	H	Željezničar	5 – 0	12,000	Andrijašević (2), Zl. Vujović (2), Kalinić
7	8 Sep	A	Velež	2 – 2	20,000	Slišković, Zl. Vujović
8	15 Sep	H	Sloboda	3 – 0	8,000	Petrinović, Zl. Vujović, Andrijašević
9	6 Oct	A	Osijek	0 – 2	10,000	
10	9 Oct	H	OFK Beograd	3 – 1	6,000	Zl. Vujović, Slišković, Jerolimov
11	13 Oct	A	Partizan	1 – 2	12,000	Weber
12	20 Oct	H	Red Star	0 – 1	20,000	
13	27 Oct	A	Vojvodina	3 – 1	6,000	Slišković, Gudelj, Zl. Vujović
14	3 Nov	H	Vardar	4 – 1	4,000	Zo. Vujović, Zl. Vujović, Vulić, Gudelj
15	24 Nov	A	Čelik	0 – 1	14,000	
16	1 Dec	H	Budućnost	2 – 0	3,000	Zl. Vujović, Andrijašević
17	8 Dec	A	Dinamo Vinkovci	1 – 3	3,000	Miše
18	1 Mar	H	Sutjeska	3 – 0	1,000	Asanović, Zl. Vujović, Slišković
19	9 Mar	A	Rijeka	0 – 3	16,000	
20	15 Mar	H	Prishtina	2 – 2	3,000	Asanović, Slišković
21	23 Mar	A	Dinamo Zagreb	1 – 1	40,000	Zl. Vujović
22	30 Mar	H	Sarajevo	6 – 2	5,000	Zl. Vujović (4), Deverić (2)
23	6 Apr	A	Željezničar	0 – 2	15,000	
24	13 Apr	H	Velež	2 – 1	4,000	Zl. Vujović, Asanović
25	20 Apr	A	Sloboda	0 – 0	6,000	
26	27 Apr	H	Osijek	1 – 1	10,000	Andrijašević
27	4 May	A	OFK Beograd	1 – 3	12,000	Andrijašević
28	7 May	H	Partizan	2 – 1	12,000	Omerović (o.g.), Zl. Vujović
29	18 May	A	Red Star	0 – 4	40,000	
30	25 May	H	Vojvodina	2 – 0	5,000	Zo. Vujović, Vulić
31	28 May	A	Vardar	2 – 3	15,000	Vulić, Gudelj
32	1 Jun	H	Čelik	2 – 0	5,000	Slišković, Miše
33	8 Jun	A	Budućnost	0 – 0	5,000	
34	29 Jun	H	Dinamo Vinkovci	6 – 1	2,000	Deverić (2), Gudelj (2), Slišković, Andrijašević

Sources: hajduk.hr

=== Yugoslav Cup ===
Round	Date	Venue	Opponent	Score	Attendance	Hajduk Scorers
R1	30 Oct	A	Borac Travnik	4 – 1	3,000	Slišković (2), Zo. Vujović, Weber
R2	20 Nov	H	OFK Beograd	0 – 0 (3 – 4 p)	2,000	

Sources: hajduk.hr

=== UEFA Cup ===
Round	Date	Venue	Opponent	Score	Attendance	Hajduk Scorers
R1	18 Sep	H	Metz (France)	5 – 1	40,000	Petrinović, Zl. Vujović (4)
R1	2 Oct	A (France)	Metz (France)	2 – 2	12,000	Zl. Vujović (2)
R2	23 Oct	A (Italy)	Torino (Italy)	1 – 1	30,000	Slišković
R2	6 Nov	H	Torino (Italy)	3 – 1	55,000	Asanović, Slišković, Zl. Vujović
R3	27 Nov	A (Soviet Union)	Dnipro Dnipropetrovsk (Soviet Union)	1 – 0	30,000	Puchkov (o.g.)
R3	11 Dec	H	Dnipro Dnipropetrovsk (Soviet Union)	2 – 0	40,000	Gudelj (2)
QF	5 Mar	H	Waregem (Belgium)	1 – 0	50,000	Zl. Vujović
QF	19 Mar	A (Belgium)	Waregem (Belgium)	0 – 1 (4 – 5 p)	20,000	

Source: hajduk.hr

== Player seasonal records ==
=== Top scorers ===
Rank	Name	League	Europe	Cup	Total
1	(Socialist Federal Republic of Yugoslavia) Zlatko Vujović	17	8	–	25
2	(Socialist Federal Republic of Yugoslavia) Blaž Slišković	7	2	2	11
2	(Socialist Federal Republic of Yugoslavia) Ivan Gudelj	6	2	–	8
4	(Socialist Federal Republic of Yugoslavia) Stjepan Andrijašević	7	–	–	7
5	(Socialist Federal Republic of Yugoslavia) Aljoša Asanović	3	1	–	4
5	(Socialist Federal Republic of Yugoslavia) Stjepan Deverić	4	–	–	4
7	(Socialist Federal Republic of Yugoslavia) Zoran Vujović	2	–	1	3
7	(Socialist Federal Republic of Yugoslavia) Zoran Vulić	3	–	–	3
9	(Socialist Federal Republic of Yugoslavia) Ante Miše	2	–	–	2
9	(Socialist Federal Republic of Yugoslavia) Vatroslav Petrinović	1	1	–	2
9	(Socialist Federal Republic of Yugoslavia) Josip Weber	1	–	1	2
12	(Socialist Federal Republic of Yugoslavia) Ive Jerolimov	1	–	–	1
12	(Socialist Federal Republic of Yugoslavia) Ivica Kalinić	1	–	–	1
	Own goals	1	1	–	2
	TOTALS	56	15	4	75

Source: Competitive matches

== See also ==
- 1985–86 Yugoslav First League
- 1985–86 Yugoslav Cup

== External sources ==
- 1985–86 Yugoslav First League at rsssf.com
- 1985–86 Yugoslav Cup at rsssf.com
- 1985–86 UEFA Cup at rsssf.com
- 1985–86 Yugoslav First League at historical-lineups.com
