= Wolfgang Rolff =

German footballer (born 1959)

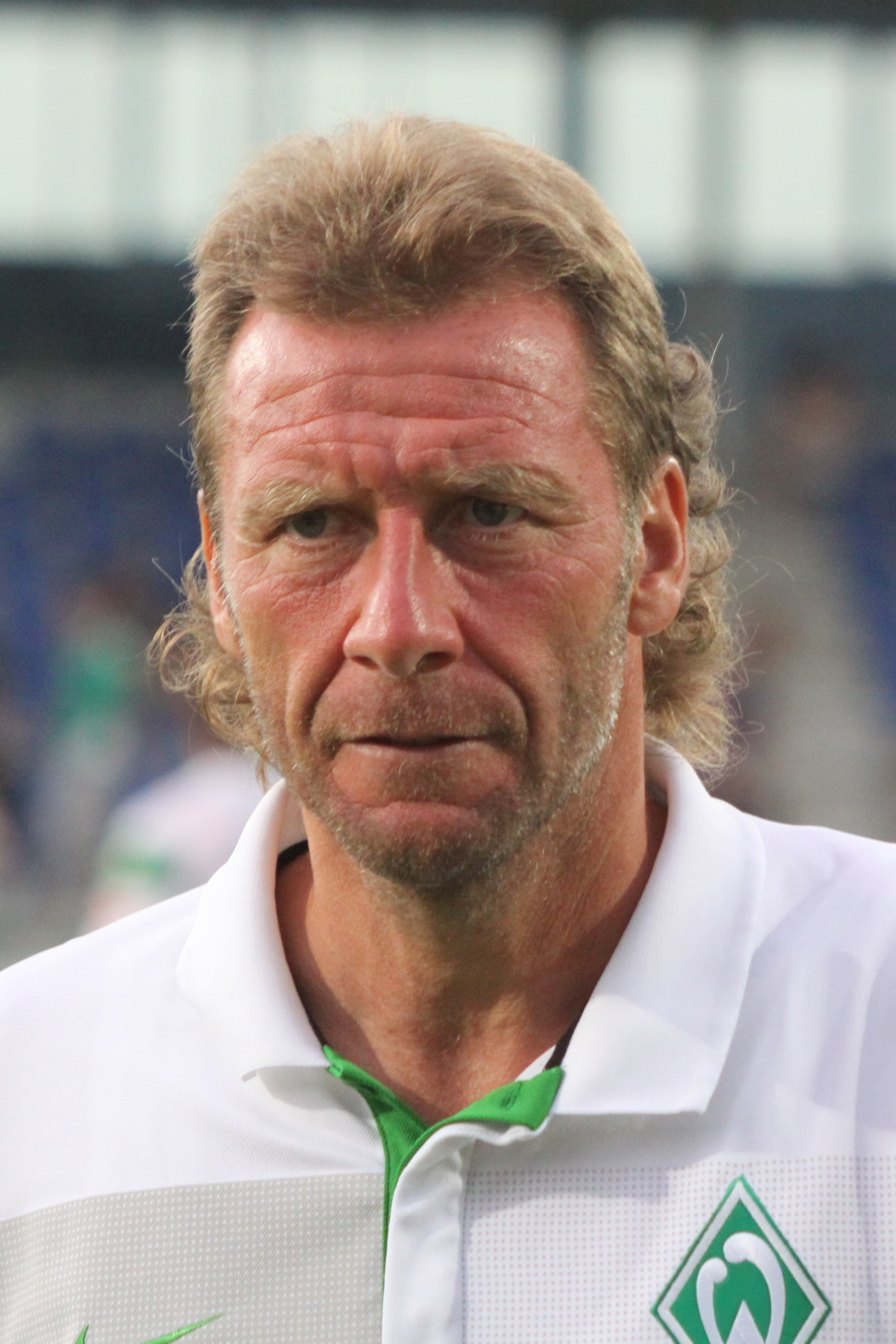
- Rolff with Werder Bremen in 2009

Personal information
- Date of birth: 26 December 1959 (age 66)
- Place of birth: Lamstedt, West Germany
- Height: 1.79 m (5 ft 10 in)
- Position: Midfielder

Team information
- Current team: Laval United (manager)

Youth career
- TSV Lamstedt
- OSC Bremerhaven

Senior career*
Years	Team	Apps	(Gls)
1979–1980	OSC Bremerhaven	35	(6)
1980–1982	Fortuna Köln	75	(17)
1982–1986	Hamburger SV	129	(24)
1986–1989	Bayer Leverkusen	99	(9)
1989–1990	Strasbourg	30	(4)
1990–1991	Bayer 05 Uerdingen	20	(0)
1991–1994	Karlsruher SC	94	(14)
1994–1995	1. FC Köln	14	(0)
1995–1996	Fortuna Köln	16	(2)
Total		512	(76)

International career
1983–1989	West Germany	37	(0)

Managerial career
- 1997: Hamburger SV (assistant)
- 1997–1998: SV Meppen
- 1998: VfB Stuttgart (assistant)
- 1998: VfB Stuttgart (caretaker)
- 2000–2001: Bayer Leverkusen (assistant)
- 2001–2002: Kuwait (assistant)
- 2004–2013: Werder Bremen (assistant)
- 2013: Werder Bremen (caretaker)
- 2014: Azerbaijan
- 2014–2015: Eintracht Frankfurt (assistant)
- 2015–2016: Al-Salmiya SC
- 2016: Hannover 96
- 2016–2017: Shandong Luneng (assistant)
- 2020–: Laval
- * Club domestic league appearances and goals

Wolfgang Rolff (born 26 December 1959) is a German football manager and former player.

== Playing career ==
Rolff played in 356 Bundesliga matches (47 goals) for Hamburger SV, Bayer 04 Leverkusen, Bayer 05 Uerdingen, Karlsruher SC and 1. FC Köln. He further took part in 126 2. Bundesliga matches (23 goals) for OSC Bremerhaven and SC Fortuna Köln, having a spell in France with RC Strasbourg for whom he scored four goals in 30 games in Ligue 2. In his years with his clubs, he won the Bundesliga title with Hamburg in 1983 and was part of the Hamburg side that clinched the European Cup against Juventus in Athens the same summer, five years later he won the UEFA Cup with Bayer 04 Leverkusen in 1988.

Reputed as a tireless midfielder, Rolff debuted for West Germany in 1983 and was part of the UEFA Euro 1984 and the UEFA Euro 1988 squad of his nation. On both occasions he featured twice each in games of West Germany, making also two appearances for the West Germans in their runner-up campaign at the 1986 FIFA World Cup in Mexico. In total he played in 37 international matches until 1989.

== Coaching career ==
His former Hamburg teammate Felix Magath appointed Rolff as assistant at Hamburger SV in 1997. In 1998 Rolff took sole charge of SV Meppen for six months until the club's relegation from the 2. Bundesliga. He went on working as assistant to his former Karlsruhe manager Winfried Schäfer at VfB Stuttgart and was, shortly after, named caretaker manager of Die Schwaben. In 2000–01, he worked in the coaching staff of former Germany coach Berti Vogts during Vogts' reign as manager of Bayer 04 Leverkusen, also one of Rolff's ex-clubs. Subsequent to Vogts' departure from Leverkusen in 2001, Rolff worked as assistant to Vogts after Vogts had been hired to guide Kuwait. Rolff did not follow Vogts to Scotland, indeed, and was in July 2004 employed by SV Werder Bremen as assistant manager. After the sacking of Thomas Schaaf, Rolff, along with Matthias Hönerbach, was interim head coach from 15 May 2013 until 27 May 2013, when Robin Dutt became the new head coach.

== Coaching record ==
As of 15 October 2014

Team	From	To	Record								
Team	From	To	M	W	D	L	GF	GA	GD	Win %	Ref.
SV Meppen	17 December 1997	30 June 1998	17	3	3	11	15	34	−19	17.65	
VfB Stuttgart	4 December 1998	31 December 1998	3	1	1	1	5	6	−1	33.33	
Werder Bremen	15 May 2013	27 May 2013	1	0	0	1	2	3	−1	0.00	
Total			21	4	4	13	22	43	−21	19.05	—

== Honours ==
=== Player ===
Hamburger SV

- Bundesliga: 1982–83
- European Cup: 1982–83
- UEFA Super Cup runner-up: 1983
- Intercontinental Cup runner-up: 1983

Bayer Leverkusen

- UEFA Cup: 1987–88

West Germany

- FIFA World Cup runner-up: 1986

=== Manager ===
Al-Salmiya

- Kuwait Crown Prince Cup: 2015–16
