= José Coelho =

José Coelho may refer to:

- José Coelho (footballer, born 1961), Portuguese footballer who played as a forward
- José Coelho (footballer, born 1990), Portuguese footballer who plays as a midfielder
- José Manuel Coelho (born 1952), Portuguese communist politician
- José Pinto Coelho (born 1960), Portuguese far-right and nationalist politician
