= FC Sportul Studențesc București in European football =

== Total statistics ==
Competition	S	P	W	D	L	GF	GA	GD
UEFA Europa League / UEFA Cup	6	20	6	4	10	20	31	–11
Total	6	20	6	4	10	20	31	–11

== Statistics by country ==
Country	Club	P	W	D	L	GF	GA	GD
Austria	SK Sturm Graz	2	0	1	1	1	2	– 1
Subtotal		2	0	1	1	1	2	– 1
Belgium	K.A.A. Gent	2	0	1	1	1	4	– 3
Subtotal		2	0	1	1	1	4	– 3
Cyprus	AC Omonia	2	1	1	0	2	1	+ 1
Subtotal		2	1	1	0	2	1	+ 1
Denmark	Brøndby IF	2	1	0	1	3	3	0
Subtotal		2	1	0	1	3	3	0
Germany / West Germany	FC Schalke 04	2	0	0	2	0	5	– 5
Subtotal		2	0	0	2	0	5	– 5
Greece	Olympiacos F.C.	2	1	0	1	4	2	+ 2
Subtotal		2	1	0	1	4	2	+ 2
Italy	F.C. Internazionale Milano	2	1	0	1	1	2	– 1
Italy	Hellas Verona F.C.	2	0	0	2	1	4	– 3
Subtotal		4	1	0	3	2	6	– 4
Poland	GKS Katowice	2	2	0	0	3	1	+ 2
Subtotal		2	2	0	0	3	1	+ 2
Switzerland	Neuchâtel Xamax	2	0	1	1	4	7	– 3
Subtotal		2	0	1	1	4	7	– 3
Total		20	6	4	10	20	31	– 11

== Statistics by competition ==
=== UEFA Europa League / UEFA Cup ===
Season	Round	Opponents	Home	Away	Aggregate
1976–77	First round	(Greece) Olympiacos	3–0	1–2	4–2
1976–77	Second round	(West Germany) Schalke 04	0–1	0–4	0–5
1983–84	First round	(Austria) Sturm Graz	1–2	0–0	1–2
1984–85	First round	(Italy) Internazionale	1–0	0–2	1–2
1985–86	First round	(Switzerland) Neuchâtel Xamax	4–4	0–3	4–7
1986–87	First round	(Cyprus) AC Omonia	1–0	1–1	2–1
1986–87	Second round	(Belgium) K.A.A. Gent	0–3	1–1	1–4
1987–88	First round	(Poland) GKS Katowice	1–0	2–1	3–1
1987–88	Second round	(Denmark) Brondby	3–0 (a.e.t.)	0–3	3–3 (3–0 p)
1987–88	Third round	(Italy) Hellas Verona	0–1	1–3	1–4
