= 1. FC Köln in European football =

German club in European football

1. Fußball-Club Köln 01/07 e. V., commonly known as simply 1. FC Köln (German pronunciation: [ʔɛf ˈtseː ˈkœln]) or in English as FC Cologne, is a German association football club based in Cologne.

This is the list of all 1. FC Köln's European matches.

== Overall record ==
Accurate as of 3 November 2022.

=== By competition ===
Competition	Pld	W	D	L	GF	GA	GD	Win %
European Cup	17	7	8	2	27	19	+8	41.18
UEFA Cup Winners' Cup	14	7	2	5	30	19	+11	50.00
UEFA Cup / UEFA Europa League	104	54	16	34	191	113	+78	51.92
UEFA Europa Conference League	8	3	2	3	12	10	+2	37.50
UEFA Intertoto Cup	11	6	3	2	23	9	+14	54.55
Total	153	77	31	45	282	167	+115	50.33

Source: UEFA.com

=== By country ===
Country	Pld	W	D	L	GF	GA	GD	Win %
Albania	2	1	1	0	2	0	+2	50.00
Austria	1	0	0	1	1	3	−2	0.00
Belarus	2	1	0	1	5	3	+2	50.00
Belgium	11	7	4	0	23	10	+13	63.64
Bulgaria	2	2	0	0	5	0	+5	100.00
Czech Republic	8	7	0	1	20	6	+14	87.50
Denmark	2	2	0	0	5	2	+3	100.00
England	14	3	4	7	20	20	+0	21.43
Finland	2	2	0	0	9	2	+7	100.00
France	10	4	2	4	19	10	+9	40.00
Germany	6	1	1	4	6	13	−7	16.67
Greece	4	3	1	0	9	2	+7	75.00
Hungary	2	1	0	1	4	2	+2	50.00
Iceland	4	3	1	0	15	2	+13	75.00
Ireland	3	3	0	0	7	1	+6	100.00
Israel	1	1	0	0	3	1	+2	100.00
Italy	8	1	2	5	5	11	−6	12.50
Netherlands	2	2	0	0	8	3	+5	100.00
Norway	2	1	0	1	9	2	+7	50.00
Poland	4	3	1	0	6	2	+4	75.00
Portugal	2	1	1	0	3	1	+2	50.00
Romania	2	1	1	0	4	3	+1	50.00
Russia	6	2	1	3	5	5	+0	33.33
Scotland	12	6	2	4	22	20	+2	50.00
Serbia	8	2	0	6	8	9	−1	25.00
Slovenia	1	1	0	0	1	0	+1	100.00
Spain	8	3	2	3	11	10	+1	37.50
Sweden	5	2	2	1	7	4	+3	40.00
Switzerland	4	3	1	0	10	4	+6	75.00
Turkey	2	1	1	0	2	0	+2	50.00

== Results ==
=== European Cup ===
Season	Round	Club	Home	Away	Neutral	Aggregate	Reference
1962–63	Preliminary Round	(Scotland) Dundee	4–0	1–8	—	5–8	
1964–65	Preliminary Round	(Albania) Partizani Tirana	2–0	0–0	—	2–0	
1964–65	First round	(Greece) Panathinaikos	2–1	1–1	—	3–2	
1964–65	Second round	(England) Liverpool	0–0	0–0	2–2 ^{1}	2–2	
1978–79	First round	(Iceland) ÍA	4–1	1–1	—	5–2	
1978–79	Second round	(Bulgaria) Lokomotiv Sofia	1–0	4–0	—	5–0	
1978–79	Quarter-finals	(Scotland) Rangers	1–0	1–1	—	2–1	
1978–79	Semi-finals	(England) Nottingham Forest	0–1	3–3	—	3–4	

^{1} Liverpool advanced to the semi-finals by winning a coin toss after their play-off match ended 2–2.

=== UEFA Cup Winners' Cup ===
Season	Round	Club	Home	Away	Aggregate	Reference
1968–69	First round	(France) Bordeaux	3–0	1–2	4–2	
1968–69	Second round	(Netherlands) ADO Den Haag	3–0	1–0	4–0	
1968–69	Quarter-finals	(Denmark) Randers	2–1	3–0	5–1	
1968–69	Semi-finals	(Spain) Barcelona	2–2	1–4	3–6	
1977–78	First round	(Portugal) Porto	2–2	0–1	2–3	
1983–84	First round	(Austria) Wacker Innsbruck	7–1	0–1	7–2	
1983–84	Second round	(Hungary) Újpest FC	4–2	1–3	5–5 (a)	

=== UEFA Cup / UEFA Europa League ===
Season	Round	Club	Home	Away	Aggregate	Reference
1971–72	First round	(France) Saint-Étienne	2–1	1–1	3–2	
1971–72	Second round	(Scotland) Dundee	2–1	2–4	4–5	
1972–73	First round	(Republic of Ireland) Bohemian	2–1	3–0	5–1	
1972–73	Second round	(Norway) Viking	9–1	0–1	9–2	
1972–73	Third round	(Germany) Borussia Mönchengladbach	0–0	0–5	0–5	
1973–74	First round	(Turkey) Eskişehirspor	2–0	0–0	2–0	
1973–74	Second round	(France) Marseille	6–0	0–2	6–2	
1973–74	Third round	(France) Nice	4–0	0–1	4–1	
1973–74	Quarter-finals	(England) Tottenham Hotspur	1–2	0–3	1–5	
1974–75	First round	(Finland) KPV	5–1	4–1	9–2	
1974–75	Second round	(Romania) Dinamo București	3–2	1–1	4–3	
1974–75	Third round	(Socialist Federal Republic of Yugoslavia) Partizan	5–1	0–1	5–2	
1974–75	Quarter-finals	(Netherlands) FC Amsterdam	5–1	3–2	8–3	
1974–75	Semi-finals	(Germany) Borussia Mönchengladbach	1–3	0–1	1–4	
1975–76	First round	(Denmark) Boldklubben 1903	2–0	3–2 (a.e.t.)	5–2	
1975–76	Second round	(Soviet Union) Spartak Moscow	0–1	0–2	0–3	
1976–77	First round	(Poland) GKS Tychy	2–0	1–1	3–1	
1976–77	Second round	(Switzerland) Grasshopper	2–0	3–2	5–2	
1976–77	Third round	(England) Queens Park Rangers	4–1	0–3	4–4 (a)	
1980–81	First round	(Iceland) ÍA	6–0	4–0	10–0	
1980–81	Second round	(Spain) Barcelona	0–1	4–0	4–1	
1980–81	Third round	(Germany) Stuttgart	4–1 (a.e.t.)	1–3	5–4	
1980–81	Quarter-finals	(Belgium) Standard Liège	3–2	0–0	3–2	
1980–81	Semi-finals	(England) Ipswich Town	0–1	0–1	0–2	
1982–83	First round	(Greece) AEK Athens	5–0	1–0	6–0	
1982–83	Second round	(Scotland) Rangers	5–0	1–2	6–2	
1982–83	Third round	(Italy) Roma	1–0	0–2	1–2	
1984–85	First round	(Poland) Pogoń Szczecin	2–1	1–0	3–1	
1984–85	Second round	(Belgium) Standard Liège	2–1	2–0	4–1	
1984–85	Third round	(Soviet Union) Spartak Moscow	2–0	0–1	2–1	
1984–85	Quarter-finals	(Italy) Inter Milan	1–3	0–1	1–4	
1985–86	First round	(Spain) Sporting Gijón	0–0	2–1	2–1	
1985–86	Second round	(Czechoslovakia) Bohemians 1905	4–0	4–2	8–2	
1985–86	Third round	(Sweden) Hammarby	3–1	1–2	4–3	
1985–86	Quarter-finals	(Portugal) Sporting CP	2–0	1–1	3–1	
1985–86	Semi-finals	(Belgium) Waregem	4–0	3–3	7–3	
1985–86	Final	(Spain) Real Madrid	2–0	1–5	3–5	
1988–89	First round	(Belgium) Royal Antwerp	4–2	2–1	6–3	
1988–89	Second round	(Scotland) Rangers	2–0	1–1	3–1	
1988–89	Third round	(Spain) Real Sociedad	2–2	0–1	2–3	
1989–90	First round	(Czechoslovakia) FC Nitra	4–1	1–0	5–1	
1989–90	Second round	(Soviet Union) Spartak Moscow	3–1	0–0	3–1	
1989–90	Third round	(Socialist Federal Republic of Yugoslavia) Red Star Belgrade	3–0	0–2	3–2	
1989–90	Quarter-finals	(Belgium) Royal Antwerp	2–0	0–0	2–0	
1989–90	Semi-finals	(Italy) Juventus	0–0	2–3	2–3	
1990–91	First round	(Sweden) Norrköping	3–1	0–0	3–1	
1990–91	Second round	(Czechoslovakia) Inter Bratislava	0–1	2–0	2–1	
1990–91	Third round	(Italy) Atalanta	1–1	0–1	1–2	
1992–93	First round	(Scotland) Celtic	2–0	0–3	2–3	
2017–18	Group stage	(England) Arsenal	1–0	1–3	3rd	
2017–18	Group stage	(Serbia) Red Star Belgrade	0–1	0–1	3rd	
2017–18	Group stage	(Belarus) BATE Borisov	5–2	0–1	3rd	

=== UEFA Europa Conference League ===
Season	Round	Club	Home	Away	Aggregate	Reference
2022–23	Play-off Round	(Hungary) Fehérvár	1–2	3–0	4–2	
2022–23	Group stage	(France) Nice	2–2	1–1	3rd	
2022–23	Group stage	(Czech Republic) Slovácko	4–2	1–0	3rd	
2022–23	Group stage	(Serbia) Partizan	0–1	0–2	3rd	

=== UEFA Intertoto Cup ===
Season	Round	Club	Home	Away	Aggregate	Reference
1995	Group stage	(Sweden) Östers	—	0–0	1st	
1995	Group stage	(Switzerland) Luzern	2–2	—	1st	
1995	Group stage	(Slovenia) Rudar Velenje	—	1–0	1st	
1995	Group stage	(England) Tottenham Hotspur	8–0	—	1st	
1995	Round of 16	(Austria) Tirol Innsbruck	1–3	—	1–3	
1997	Group stage	(Israel) Maccabi Petah Tikva	—	3–1	1st	
1997	Group stage	(Switzerland) Aarau	3–0	—	1st	
1997	Group stage	(Republic of Ireland) Cork City	—	2–0	1st	
1997	Group stage	(Belgium) Standard Liège	1–1	—	1st	
1997	Round of 16	(France) Montpellier	2–1	0–1	2–2 (a)	
