= Jurgen Vandeurzen =

Belgian footballer

Personal information
- Full name: Jurgen Vandeurzen
- Date of birth: 26 January 1974 (age 52)
- Place of birth: Genk, Belgium
- Position: Midfielder

Senior career*
Years	Team	Apps	(Gls)
1991–1996	Genk	100	(3)
1996–1997	Overpelt-Fabriek	33	(9)
1997–1998	RFC Liège	29	(6)
1998–2001	Turnhout	113	(8)
2001–2003	Stoke City	52	(5)
2003	Dessel Sport	10	(0)
2003–2004	Patro Maasmechelen	51	(6)
2004–2006	Beringen-Heusden-Zolder	28	(2)
2006–2008	Patro Eisden Maasmechelen	68	(9)
2008–2009	KS Kermt-Hasselt	21	(0)
2009–2011	Bregel Sport		
Total		505	(48)

Managerial career
- 2017–2020: Eendracht Louwel
- * Club domestic league appearances and goals

Jurgen Vandeurzen (born 26 January 1974) is a Belgian former professional footballer who played as a midfielder. He spent most of his career in Belgium apart from a two-year spell playing in England for Stoke City.

== Career ==
Vandeurzen made his debut for his local club Genk on 24 November 1991. A product of the club's youth teams, he is most often a replacement but nevertheless plays around thirty games during his first two seasons in professional football. From the 1993–94 season, Vandeurzen became a regular player in the Genk midfield. Unfortunately for him and for his team, Genk finished in last position and was relegated to the Belgian Second Division.

Vandeurzen remained loyal to his club after relegation but after one season, he lost his place in the Genk first team and, once promotion back to the Belgian First Division was achieved in 1995–96, he had to leave the club. He signed up with Second Division side Overpelt-Fabriek. After a catastrophic 1996–97 season, the club was relegated to the Belgian Third Division and Vandeurzen left for RFC Liège, where he has the tough task of succeeding Benoît Thans, who left for KVC Westerlo. He spent the 1997–98 season with RFC Liège, playing 29 times, scoring six goals as the team finished in seventh position and at the end of the campaign he joined Turnhout. Vandeurzen had three full seasons at Turnhout, playing over a hundred league games. Turnhout qualified each time for the promotion play-offs but were unable to secure a place in the First Division and were then relegated to the Third Division in 2000–01 after failing to secure a licence.

Vandeurzen moved to English Second Division club Stoke City in the summer of 2001 becoming the club's first Belgian footballer. He played a key role in 2001–02 playing in 48 matches scoring four goals as Stoke gained promotion to the second tier after beating Brentford 2–0 in the 2002 play-off final. He played in 12 matches in 2002–03, scoring once in a 1–1 draw against Reading before being released in January 2003 where he returned to Belgium with Dessel Sport.

He stayed six months in Dessel playing ten matches. At the end of the season, he signed a contract with Patro Maasmechelen, another second-tier side. Vandeurzen became a regular member of the team and missed only one match during the 2003–04 season. He continued at the club but, because of his financial difficulties, he decided to leave in January 2005 and joined Beringen-Heusden-Zolder. Unfortunately, the club was also experiencing financial problems the following season and a year after moving from Maasmechelen to Heusden, Vandeurzen goes the other way and returned to his old club, now renamed Patro Eisden Maasmechelen and relegated to the Belgian Fourth Division. He remained two and a half years in the border town, without managing to go up to the Third Division. In September 2008, he joined KS Kermt-Hasselt and retired from playing semi-professional football at the end of the 2008–09 season. He played at amateur level with Bregel Sport whilst also doing coaching at the club from 2009 to 2011.

== Managerial career ==
Vandeurzen was head coach at Limburg Provincial League side Eendracht Louwel from November 2017 until February 2020.

== Career statistics ==
Appearances and goals by club, season and competition
Club	Season	League			National cup		League cup		Other		Total	
Club	Season	Division	Apps	Goals	Apps	Goals	Apps	Goals	Apps	Goals	Apps	Goals
Genk	1991–92	Belgian First Division	13	2	0	0	—		—		13	2
Genk	1992–93	Belgian First Division	15	0	1	0	—		—		16	0
Genk	1993–94	Belgian First Division	25	0	1	0	—		—		26	0
Genk	1994–95	Belgian Second Division	20	1	0	0	—		—		20	1
Genk	1995–96	Belgian Second Division	27	0	1	0	—		—		28	0
Genk	Total		100	3	3	0	0	0	0	0	103	3
Overpelt-Fabriek	1996–97	Belgian Second Division	33	9	1	1	—		—		34	10
RFC Liège	1997–98	Belgian Second Division	29	6	1	0	1	0	—		31	6
Turnhout	1998–99	Belgian Second Division	35	2	1	0	0	0	—		36	2
Turnhout	1999–2000	Belgian Second Division	39	3	2	0	0	0	—		41	3
Turnhout	2000–01	Belgian Second Division	39	3	3	0	0	0	—		42	3
Turnhout	Total		113	8	6	0	0	0	0	0	119	8
Stoke City	2001–02	Second Division	40	4	4	0	1	0	3 (Note: Appearances in Second Division play-offs)	0	48	4
Stoke City	2002–03	First Division	12	1	0	0	0	0	—		12	1
Stoke City	Total		52	5	4	0	1	0	3	0	60	5
Dessel Sport	2002–03	Belgian Second Division	10	0	0	0	—		—		10	0
Patro Maasmechelen	2003–04	Belgian Second Division	32	4	1	0	—		—		33	1
Patro Maasmechelen	2004–05	Belgian Second Division	19	2	3	1	—		—		22	3
Patro Maasmechelen	Total		51	6	4	1	0	0	0	0	55	7
Beringen-Heusden-Zolder	2004–05	Belgian Second Division	12	2	0	0	—		—		12	2
Beringen-Heusden-Zolder	2005–06	Belgian Second Division	16	0	1	0	—		—		17	0
Beringen-Heusden-Zolder	Total		28	2	1	0	0	0	0	0	29	2
Patro Eisden Maasmechelen	2005–06	Belgian Promotion Division	13	2	0	0	—		—		13	2
Patro Eisden Maasmechelen	2006–07	Belgian Promotion Division	27	3	3	1	—		—		30	4
Patro Eisden Maasmechelen	2007–08	Belgian Promotion Division	28	4	4	0	—		—		32	4
Patro Eisden Maasmechelen	Total		68	9	7	1	0	0	0	0	75	10
KS Kermt-Hasselt	2008–09	Belgian Promotion Division	21	0	4	3	—		—		25	3
Career total			505	48	31	6	2	0	3	0	541	54

== Honours ==
Stoke City

- Football League Second Division play-offs: 2002
