= Sergei Novikov (footballer) =

Soviet and Russian footballer

Personal information
- Full name: Sergei Borisovich Novikov
- Date of birth: 13 June 1961 (age 65)
- Place of birth: Moscow, Russian SFSR
- Height: 1.83 m (6 ft 0 in)
- Position: Midfielder

Senior career*
Years	Team	Apps	(Gls)
1978–1980	FC Spartak Moscow (reserves)		
1981–1984	FC Iskra Smolensk	135	(23)
1985–1989	FC Spartak Moscow	70	(12)
1990	FC Asmaral Moscow	25	(10)
1990–1991	MSV Post Neubrandenburg	2	(0)
1991	FC Asmaral Moscow	3	(0)
1991	FC Presnya Moscow	3	(1)
1991	FC Volga Tver	12	(3)
1992	Mohammedan	?	(?)
- * Club domestic league appearances and goals

Sergei Borisovich Novikov (Russian: Серге́й Борисович Новиков; born 13 June 1961) is a retired Soviet and Russian professional football player.

== Honours ==
- Soviet Top League champion: 1987, 1989
- Soviet Top League runner-up: 1985
- Soviet Top League bronze: 1986
- USSR Federation Cup winner: 1987

== European club competitions ==
With FC Spartak Moscow.

- 1985–86 UEFA Cup: 6 games, 1 goal
- 1986–87 UEFA Cup: 3 games, 2 goals
- 1987–88 UEFA Cup: 1 game
