= Andreas Gielchen =

German footballer (1964–2023)

Personal information
- Date of birth: 27 October 1964
- Place of birth: Eschweiler, North Rhine-Westphalia West Germany
- Date of death: 3 February 2023 (aged 58)
- Height: 1.76 m (5 ft 9 in)
- Positions: Defender; midfielder

Youth career
- SG Eschweiler
- Alemannia Aachen

Senior career*
Years	Team	Apps	(Gls)
1983–1991	1. FC Köln	131	(2)
1991–1993	MSV Duisburg	58	(0)
1993–1996	Alemannia Aachen		

International career
	Germany U-21	1	(0)
- * Club domestic league appearances and goals

Andreas Gielchen (27 October 1964 – 3 February 2023) was a German professional footballer who played as a defender and midfielder.

== Honours ==
1. FC Köln

- UEFA Cup finalist: 1985–86
- DFB-Pokal finalist: 1990–91
- Bundesliga runner-up: 1988–89, 1989–90
