= Ralf Geilenkirchen =

German footballer

Personal information
- Date of birth: 26 April 1966 (age 60)
- Place of birth: Aachen, West Germany
- Height: 1.78 m (5 ft 10 in)
- Position: Midfielder

Youth career
- 1971–1981: Alemannia Aachen
- 1981–1984: 1. FC Köln

Senior career*
Years	Team	Apps	(Gls)
1984–1988	1. FC Köln	65	(9)
1988–1990	FC Antwerp	55	(9)
1990–1993	Eintracht Braunschweig	73	(6)
1993–1994	KFC Uerdingen 05	11	(1)
1994–1995	Viktoria Köln		
- * Club domestic league appearances and goals

Ralf Geilenkirchen (born 26 April 1966) is a German former professional footballer who played as a midfielder.

== Club career ==
Geilenkirchen played four years for 1. FC Köln, being coached under Hannes Löhr, Georg Keßler and Christoph Daum. He participated in the 1986 UEFA Cup Final, scoring a goal in the 72nd minute of the second leg.
