= 1985–86 UEFA Cup =

15th season of Europe's secondary club football tournament organised by UEFA

- Dates: 11 September 1985 – 6 May 1986

Final positions
- Champions: (Spain) Real Madrid (2nd title)
- Runners-up: (West Germany) Köln

Tournament statistics
- Matches played: 126
- Goals scored: 374 (2.97 per match)
- Attendance: 3,058,332 (24,272 per match)
- Top scorer(s): Klaus Allofs (Köln); 9 goals

The 1985–86 UEFA Cup was the 15th season of the UEFA Cup, the third-tier club football competition organised by the Union of European Football Associations (UEFA). The final was played over two legs at the Santiago Bernabéu Stadium, Madrid, Spain, and at the Olympiastadion, West Berlin, West Germany. For the second year in a row, the competition was won by Real Madrid of Spain, who defeated Köln of West Germany by an aggregate result of 5–3.

Real Madrid became the first club to successfully defend the UEFA Cup, a feat that would only be repeated by Sevilla on two occasions during the 21st century, both in the UEFA Cup (2006 and 2007) and its successor UEFA Europa League (2014 and 2015). In the former Inter-Cities Fairs Cup, the unofficial predecessor of the UEFA Cup, it was only achieved by a representative team of the city of Barcelona (1958 and 1960) and by Valencia (1963 and 1964), both also fellow Spanish squads.

It was the first season in which English clubs were serving an indefinite ban from European football competitions due to the Heysel Stadium disaster, which would last for five seasons before being lifted for the 1990–91 season.

== Association team allocation ==
A total of 64 teams from 31 UEFA member associations participated in the 1985–86 UEFA Cup, all entering from the first round over six knock-out rounds. The association ranking based on the UEFA country coefficients is used to determine the number of participating teams for each association:

- Associations 1–3 each have four teams qualify.
- Associations 4–8 each have three teams qualify.
- Associations 9–21 each have two teams qualify.
- Associations 22–32 each have one team qualify.

Following the English ban, their four berths were redistributed among associations 9–12, each gaining a third berth.

=== Association ranking ===
For the 1985–86 UEFA Cup, the associations are allocated places according to their 1984 UEFA country coefficients, which takes into account their performance in European competitions from 1979–80 to 1983–84.

Association ranking for 1985–86 UEFA Cup

Rank	Association	Coeff.	Teams	Notes
1	West Germany	43.618	4	
2	England	37.950	0	
3	Spain	32.199	4	
4	Scotland	31.950	3	
5	Italy	31.633	3	
6	Belgium	31.616	3	
7	Portugal	31.250	3	
8	(Socialist Federal Republic of Yugoslavia) Yugoslavia	28.450	3	
9	Soviet Union	27.916	3	
10	France	27.250	3	
11	Czechoslovakia	25.550	3	
12	Netherlands	25.549	3	
13	East Germany	24.100	2	
14	Romania	21.416	2	
15	Switzerland	18.250	2	
16	Sweden	18.000	2	
-	Wales	17.000	0	

Rank	Association	Coeff.	Teams	Notes
17	Bulgaria	16.750	2	
18	Austria	15.500	2	
19	Hungary	14.750	2	
20	Poland	13.250	2	
21	Greece	12.750	2	
22	Denmark	10.749	1	
23	(Republic of Ireland) Republic of Ireland	7.332	1	
24	Albania	7.000	1	
25	Turkey	5.333	1	
26	Norway	5.249	1	
27	Cyprus	4.998	1	
28	Finland	4.998	1	
29	(Northern Ireland) Northern Ireland	3.998	1	
30	Luxembourg	2.666	1	
31	Iceland	2.331	1	
32	Malta	1.999	1	

England: Due to the Heysel Stadium disaster, all English football clubs were placed under an indefinite ban by Union of European Football Associations (UEFA) from all European competitions, which would be lifted in 1990–91. As a result, each of their four allocated UEFA Cup berths for 1985–86 were transferred as a third berth for associations 9–12, namely the Soviet Union, France, Czechoslovakia and the Netherlands. Two-time UEFA Cup winners Liverpool and Tottenham Hotspur, as well as Southampton and Norwich City had qualified for the tournament prior to the ban.
Wales: There was no national league in Wales before 1992 and the only competition organised by the Football Association of Wales was the Welsh Cup so Wales had just a single participant in European competitions, the winner (or best placed Welsh team as several English teams also competed) of the Welsh Cup which competed in the UEFA Cup Winners' Cup. Its virtual ranking is only an original research, because the UEFA country ranking was only used to allocate the UEFA Cup spots at time, so Wales was not included.

=== Teams ===
The labels in parentheses show how each team qualified for competition:

- TH: Title holders
- CW: Cup winners
- CR: Cup runners-up
- LC: League Cup winners
- 2nd, 3rd, 4th, 5th, 6th, etc.: League position
- P-W: End-of-season European competition play-offs winners

Qualified teams for 1985–86 UEFA Cup
(West Germany) Werder Bremen (2nd)	(West Germany) Köln (3rd)	(West Germany) Borussia Mönchengladbach (4th)	(West Germany) Hamburger SV (5th)
(Spain) Athletic Bilbao (3rd)	(Spain) Sporting de Gijón (4th)	(Spain) Real Madrid (5th)^{TH}	(Spain) Osasuna (6th)
(Scotland) Dundee United (3rd)	(Scotland) Rangers (4th)	(Scotland) St Mirren (5th)	(Italy) Torino (2nd)
(Italy) Internazionale (3rd)	(Italy) Milan (5th)	(Belgium) Club Brugge (2nd)	(Belgium) RFC Liège (3rd)
(Belgium) Waregem (4th)	(Portugal) Sporting CP (2nd)	(Portugal) Boavista (4th)	(Portugal) Portimonense (5th)
(Socialist Federal Republic of Yugoslavia) Hajduk Split (2nd)	(Socialist Federal Republic of Yugoslavia) Partizan (3rd)	(Socialist Federal Republic of Yugoslavia) Vardar (5th)	(Soviet Union) Spartak Moscow (2nd)
(Soviet Union) Dnipro Dnipropetrovsk (3rd)	(Soviet Union) Chornomorets Odesa (4th)	(France) Nantes (2nd)	(France) Auxerre (4th)
(France) Metz (5th)	(Czechoslovakia) Bohemians Prague (2nd)	(Czechoslovakia) Slavia Prague (3rd)	(Czechoslovakia) Baník Ostrava (4th)
(Netherlands) PSV Eindhoven (2nd)	(Netherlands) Feyenoord (3rd)	(Netherlands) Sparta Rotterdam (4th)	(East Germany) Lokomotive Leipzig (3rd)
(East Germany) Wismut Aue (4th)	(Romania) Dinamo București (2nd)	(Romania) Sportul Studențesc (3rd)	(Switzerland) Neuchâtel Xamax (3rd)
(Switzerland) St. Gallen (4th)	(Sweden) Malmö (3rd)	(Sweden) Hammarby (4th)	(Bulgaria) Lokomotiv Sofia (4th)
(Bulgaria) Pirin Blagoevgrad (5th)	(Austria) LASK (3rd)	(Austria) Wacker Innsbruck (4th)	(Hungary) Győri ETO (2nd)
(Hungary) Videoton (3rd)	(Poland) Legia Warsaw (2nd)	(Poland) Lech Poznań (4th)	(Greece) Panathinaikos (2nd)
(Greece) AEK Athens (3rd)	(Denmark) AGF (2nd)	(Republic of Ireland) Bohemians (2nd)	(Albania) Dinamo Tirana (2nd)
(Turkey) Beşiktaş (2nd)	(Norway) Viking (2nd)	(Cyprus) APOEL (2nd)	(Finland) TPS (2nd)
(Northern Ireland) Coleraine (2nd)	(Luxembourg) Avenir Beggen (3rd)	(Iceland) Valur (2nd)	(Malta) Ħamrun Spartans (2nd)

Notes

1. Bulgaria: The top two teams of the 1984-85 A Group season, Levski Sofia and CSKA Sofia, were disbanded by the Central Committee of the Bulgarian Communist Party and refounded, after a number of violent incidents on the pitch during the 1985 Bulgarian Cup final. Trakia Plovdiv, which would have qualified for the UEFA Cup along CSKA Sofia, was awarded with the title and competed at the European Cup. Therefore, the UEFA Cup places went to Lokomotiv Sofia and Pirin Blagoevgrad, which had initially finished the season in 4th and 5th place. The decision regarding league placements was eventually reversed in 1990.

== Schedule ==
The schedule of the competition was as follows. Matches were scheduled for Wednesdays, though some matches exceptionally took place on Tuesdays or Thursdays. In a departure from previous editions, both semi-finals were played in different days, and the two-legged final was held on consecutive weeks, with the second leg being played on a Tuesday.

Schedule for 1985–86 UEFA Cup
Round	First leg	Second leg
First round	11–19 September 1985	1–3 October 1985
Second round	23 October 1985	6 November 1985
Third round	27 November 1985	11 December 1985
Quarter-finals	4–5 March 1986	18–19 March 1986
Semi-finals	2–3 April 1986	15–16 April 1986
Final	30 April 1986	6 May 1986

== First round ==
Team 1	Agg.	Team 2	1st leg	2nd leg
Köln (West Germany)	2–1	(Spain) Sporting de Gijón	0–0	2–1
AEK Athens (Greece)	1–5	(Spain) Real Madrid	1–0	0–5
Auxerre (France)	3–4	(Italy) Milan	3–1	0–3
APOEL (Cyprus)	4–6	(Bulgaria) Lokomotiv Sofia	2–2	2–4 (a.e.t.)
Athletic Bilbao (Spain)	5–1	(Turkey) Beşiktaş	4–1	1–0
Boavista (Portugal)	5–6	(Belgium) Club Brugge	4–3	1–3
Bohemians (Republic of Ireland)	4–7	(Scotland) Dundee United	2–5	2–2
Borussia Mönchengladbach (West Germany)	3–1	(Poland) Lech Poznań	1–1	2–0
Coleraine (Northern Ireland)	1–6	(East Germany) Lokomotive Leipzig	1–1	0–5
Dinamo București (Romania)	2–2 (a)	(Socialist Federal Republic of Yugoslavia) Vardar	2–1	0–1
Avenir Beggen (Luxembourg)	0–6	(Netherlands) PSV Eindhoven	0–2	0–4
Chornomorets Odesa (Soviet Union)	4–4 (a)	(West Germany) Werder Bremen	2–1	2–3
Wismut Aue (East Germany)	2–5	(Soviet Union) Dnipro Dnipropetrovsk	1–3	1–2
Spartak Moscow (Soviet Union)	4–1	(Finland) TPS	1–0	3–1
Győri ETO (Hungary)	4–5	(Czechoslovakia) Bohemians Praha	3–1	1–4 (a.e.t.)
Hajduk Split (Socialist Federal Republic of Yugoslavia)	7–3	(France) Metz	5–1	2–2
Internazionale (Italy)	5–1	(Switzerland) St. Gallen	5–1	0–0
Waregem (Belgium)	6–2	(Denmark) AGF	5–2	1–0
Dinamo Tirana (Albania)	1–0	(Malta) Ħamrun Spartans	1–0	0–0
LASK (Austria)	3–0	(Czechoslovakia) Baník Ostrava	2–0	1–0
Legia Warsaw (Poland)	4–1	(Norway) Viking	3–0	1–1
Neuchâtel Xamax (Switzerland)	7–4	(Romania) Sportul Studențesc	3–0	4–4
Pirin Blagoevgrad (Bulgaria)	1–7	(Sweden) Hammarby	1–3	0–4
Portimonense (Portugal)	1–4	(Socialist Federal Republic of Yugoslavia) Partizan	1–0	0–4
RFC Liège (Belgium)	4–1	(Austria) Wacker Innsbruck	1–0	3–1
Rangers (Scotland)	1–2	(Spain) Osasuna	1–0	0–2
Slavia Prague (Czechoslovakia)	1–3	(Scotland) St Mirren	1–0	0–3 (a.e.t.)
Sparta Rotterdam (Netherlands)	2–2 (4–3 p)	(West Germany) Hamburger SV	2–0	0–2 (a.e.t.)
Sporting CP (Portugal)	4–3	(Netherlands) Feyenoord	3–1	1–2
Torino (Italy)	3–2	(Greece) Panathinaikos	2–1	1–1
Valur (Iceland)	2–4	(France) Nantes	2–1	0–3
Videoton (Hungary)	3–3 (a)	(Sweden) Malmö	1–0	2–3

=== First leg ===
11 September 1985

Avenir Beggen (Luxembourg)	0–2	(Netherlands) PSV Eindhoven
	Report	Thoresen 31'; Lokhoff 81'

Stade rue Henri Dunant, Beggen
Attendance: 1,157
Referee: Frans Van Den Wijngaert (Belgium)

17 September 1985

Slavia Prague (Czechoslovakia)	1–0	(Scotland) St Mirren
Kouřil 76'	Report

Stadion Eden Dr.Václava Vacka, Prague
Attendance: 5,580
Referee: Gerard Geurds (Netherlands)

17 September 1985

Valur (Iceland)	2–1	(France) Nantes
Þorbjörnsson 49', 87'	Report	Touré 51'

Hlíðarendi, Reykjavík
Attendance: 1,951
Referee: Svein Inge Thime (Norway)

18 September 1985

Chornomorets Odesa (Soviet Union)	2–1	(West Germany) Werder Bremen
Yurchenko 13'; Scherbakov 42'	Report	Meier 47'

ChMP Central Stadium, Odessa
Attendance: 40,887
Referee: Einar Halle (Norway)

18 September 1985

Dinamo București (Romania)	2–1	(Socialist Federal Republic of Yugoslavia) Vardar
Rednic 29'; Augustin 50' (pen.)	Report	Pančev 10'

Stadionul Dinamo, Bucharest
Attendance: 8,300
Referee: Valeri Butenko (Soviet Union)

18 September 1985
16:00

Wismut Aue (East Germany)	1–3	(Soviet Union) Dnipro
Schmidt 75'	Report	Lytovchenko 28'; Protasov 47'; Kuznetsov 76'

Otto-Grotewohl-Stadion, Aue
Attendance: 22,000
Referee: Jiří Stiegler (Czechoslovakia)

18 September 1985

Dinamo Tirana (Albania)	1–0	(Malta) Ħamrun Spartans
Eduard Abazi 57'	Report

Qemal Stafa Stadium, Tirana
Attendance: 13,221
Referee: Kyros Georgiou (Cyprus)

18 September 1985

Coleraine (Northern Ireland)	1–1	(East Germany) Lokomotive Leipzig
Wade 2'	Report	Liebers 67'

The Showgrounds, Coleraine
Attendance: 2,149
Referee: Bep Thomas (Netherlands)

18 September 1985

Pirin Blagoevgrad (Bulgaria)	1–3	(Sweden) Hammarby
Dinev 45'	Report	Eriksson 12'; Wahlberg 59'; Lundin 83'

Stadion Hristo Botev, Blagoevgrad
Attendance: 10,000
Referee: Costas Kapsos (Cyprus)

18 September 1985

Spartak Moscow (Soviet Union)	1–0	(Finland) TPS
Cherenkov 24'	Report

Central Lenin Stadium, Moscow
Attendance: 21,300
Referee: Borislav Alexandrov (Bulgaria)

18 September 1985

Videoton (Hungary)	1–0	(Sweden) Malmö
Végh 77'	Report

Sóstói Stadion, Székesfehérvár
Attendance: 8,500
Referee: Jean-François Crucke (Belgium)

18 September 1985

Hajduk Split (Socialist Federal Republic of Yugoslavia)	5–1	(France) Metz
Petrinović 12'; Zl. Vujović 27' (pen.), 63', 66', 76'	Report	Bocandé 30'

Stadion Poljud, Split
Attendance: 30,000
Referee: George Courtney (England)

18 September 1985

LASK (Austria)	2–0	(Czechoslovakia) Baník Ostrava
Małnowicz 27'; Köstenberger 80'	Report

Linzer Stadion, Linz
Attendance: 4,600
Referee: Velitchko Nikolov Tzontchev (Bulgaria)

18 September 1985

APOEL (Cyprus)	2–2	(Bulgaria) Lokomotiv Sofia
Prokopis 20'; McDermott 49'	Report	Velichkov 30'; Vasilev 53'

GSP Stadium, Nicosia
Attendance: 6,818
Referee: Arsen Hoxha (Albania)

18 September 1985
21:00

AEK Athens (Greece)	1–0	(Spain) Real Madrid
Papaioannou 10'	Report

Athens Olympic Stadium, Athens
Attendance: 39,819
Referee: Ioan Igna (Romania)

18 September 1985

Borussia Mönchengladbach (West Germany)	1–1	(Poland) Lech Poznań
Mill 60'	Report	Łukasik 73'

Bökelbergstadion, Mönchengladbach
Attendance: 11,000
Referee: Malcolm Moffatt (Northern Ireland)

18 September 1985

Győri ETO (Hungary)	3–1	(Czechoslovakia) Bohemians Praha
Hannich 19', 75'; Chaloupka 48' (o.g.)	Report	Tymich 24'

Stadion ETO, Győr
Attendance: 10,500
Referee: Joe Worrall (England)

18 September 1985

Köln (West Germany)	0–0	(Spain) Sporting de Gijón
	Report

Müngersdorfer Stadion, Cologne
Attendance: 12,000
Referee: Lajos Nemeth (Hungary)

18 September 1985

RFC Liège (Belgium)	1–0	(Austria) Wacker Innsbruck
Thans 65'	Report

Stade Vélodrome de Rocourt, Rocourt
Attendance: 9,095
Referee: Vitor M. Fernandes Correia (Portugal)

18 September 1985
20:00

Sparta Rotterdam (Netherlands)	2–0	(West Germany) Hamburger SV
Lengkeek 75'; Schmidt 79'	Report

Feijenoord Stadion, Rotterdam
Attendance: 7,968
Referee: John Edward Martin (England)

18 September 1985

Waregem (Belgium)	5–2	(Denmark) AGF
Veyt 40'; Povlsen 49' (o.g.); Dekenne 54'; Desmet 57'; De Craeye 65'	Report	Lundkvist 24'; Mortensen 77'

Regenboogstadion, Waregem
Attendance: 7,083
Referee: Günther Habermann (East Germany)

18 September 1985

Neuchâtel Xamax (Switzerland)	3–0	(Romania) Sportul Studențesc
Jacobacci 11'; Ryf 27'; Stielike 65'	Report

Stade de la Maladière, Neuchâtel
Attendance: 14,800
Referee: Stoyan Ilijevski (Yugoslavia)

18 September 1985

Legia Warsaw (Poland)	3–0	(Norway) Viking
Dziekanowski 35'; Arceusz 66'; Buda 68'	Report

Stadion Wojska Polskiego, Warsaw
Attendance: 5,911
Referee: Heinz Holzmann (Austria)

18 September 1985

Athletic Bilbao (Spain)	4–1	(Turkey) Beşiktaş
Salinas 30', 49', 84'; Sarabia 62'	Report	Keskin 16'

Estadio de San Mamés, Bilbao
Attendance: 26,000
Referee: Kenny Hope (Scotland)

18 September 1985

Auxerre (France)	3–1	(Italy) Milan
Garande 38', 53'; Danio 67'	Report	Virdis 3'

Stade de l'Abbé-Deschamps, Auxerre
Attendance: 14,662
Referee: Brian McGinlay (Scotland)

18 September 1985

Internazionale (Italy)	5–1	(Switzerland) St. Gallen
Altobelli 9'; Marangon 35'; Mandorlini 44'; Rummenigge 60', 86'	Report	Pellegrini 70'

San Siro, Milan
Attendance: 35,457

18 September 1985

Rangers (Scotland)	1–0	(Spain) Osasuna
Paterson 55'	Report

Ibrox Stadium, Glasgow
Attendance: 29,479
Referee: Vojtech Christov (Czechoslovakia)

18 September 1985

Torino (Italy)	2–1	(Greece) Panathinaikos
Comi 48'; Mavridis 87' (o.g.)	Report	Saravakos 51'

Stadio Comunale Vittorio Pozzo, Turin
Attendance: 46,521

18 September 1985

Bohemians (Republic of Ireland)	2–5	(Scotland) Dundee United
Lawless 39'; O'Brien 69'	Report	Sturrock 4', 52', 58'; Bannon 33', 37'

Dalymount Park, Dublin
Attendance: 4,623
Referee: Ronald Bridges (Wales)

18 September 1985

Portimonense (Portugal)	1–0	(Socialist Federal Republic of Yugoslavia) Partizan
Efigénia 53'	Report

Estádio do Portimonense SC, Portimão
Attendance: 13,000
Referee: Alphonse Costantin (Belgium)

18 September 1985

Sporting CP (Portugal)	3–1	(Netherlands) Feyenoord
Manuel Fernandes 29', 63'; Rui Jordão 34'	Report	Duut 77'

Estádio José Alvalade, Lisbon
Attendance: 50,000
Referee: Bob Valentine (Scotland)

19 September 1985

Boavista (Portugal)	4–3	(Belgium) Club Brugge
José Rafael 11', 65'; Tonanha 46'; José Coelho 72'	Report	Papin 4'; Ceulemans 69'; Van der Elst 80'

Estádio do Bessa, Porto
Attendance: 20,000
Referee: Kurt Röthlisberger (Switzerland)

=== Second leg ===
1 October 1985

Baník Ostrava (Czechoslovakia)	0–1	(Austria) LASK
	Report	Lehermayr 87'

Bazaly, Ostrava
Attendance: 5,300
Referee: Franz Gächter (Switzerland)

LASK won 3–0 on aggregate.

2 October 1985

Lokomotiv Sofia (Bulgaria)	4–2 (a.e.t.)	(Cyprus) APOEL
Velichkov 12' (pen.), 80'; Petkov 97', 107'	Report	Moores 17'; Ioannou 23'

Lokomotiv Stadium, Sofia
Attendance: 6,000
Referee: Austin Puglisevich (Malta)

Lokomotiv Sofia won 6–4 on aggregate.

2 October 1985

Ħamrun Spartans (Malta)	0–0	(Albania) Dinamo Tirana
	Report

Victor Tedesco Stadium, Hamrun
Attendance: 6,743
Referee: Bruno Galler (Switzerland)

Dinamo Tirana won 1–0 on aggregate.

2 October 1985

Vardar (Socialist Federal Republic of Yugoslavia)	1–0	(Romania) Dinamo București
Zdravkov 46'	Report

Gradski stadion, Skopje
Attendance: 27,000
Referee: Dieter Pauly (West Germany)

2–2 on aggregate; Vardar won on away goals.

2 October 1985

Lech Poznań (Poland)	0–2	(West Germany) Borussia Mönchengladbach
	Report	Niewiadomski 32' (o.g.); Lienen 77'

Municipal Stadium Poznan, Poznań
Attendance: 15,380
Referee: Bo Helen (Sweden)

Borussia Mönchengladbach won 3–1 on aggregate.

2 October 1985

Lokomotive Leipzig (East Germany)	5–0	(Northern Ireland) Coleraine
Leitzke 10'; Kühn 33'; Baum 34'; Liebers 44'; Richter 83'	Report

Bruno-Plache-Stadion, Leipzig
Attendance: 9,000
Referee: Roger Philippi (Luxembourg)

Lokomotive Leipzig won 6–1 on aggregate.

2 October 1985

Bohemians Praha (Czechoslovakia)	4–1 (a.e.t.)	(Hungary) Győri ETO
Marčík 8'; Mičinec 18'; Hruška 88', 108'	Report	Hajszán 44'

Tehelné Pole, Bratislava
Attendance: 12,896
Referee: Paolo Bergamo (Italy)

Bohemians Praha won 5–4 on aggregate.

2 October 1985
19:00

Dnipro (Soviet Union)	2–1	(East Germany) Wismut Aue
Protasov 51', 81'	Report	Lorenz 72'

Stadion Metalurh, Kryvyi Rih (Note: Dnipro Dnipropetrovsk played their home matches at Stadion Metalurh, Kryvyi Rih, instead of their regular stadium Meteor Stadium, Dnipropetrovsk, as Dnipropetrovsk was a closed city for foreigners.)
Attendance: 25,946
Referee: Miklós Nagy (Hungary)

Dnipro won 5–2 on aggregate.

2 October 1985

Partizan (Socialist Federal Republic of Yugoslavia)	4–0	(Portugal) Portimonense
Vučićević 18', 81', 85'; Đukić 27'	Report

JNA Stadium, Belgrade
Attendance: 17,756
Referee: Sadik Deda (Turkey)

Partizan won 4-1 on aggregate.

2 October 1985

TPS (Finland)	1–3	(Soviet Union) Spartak Moscow
Lipponen 17'	Report	Heikkinen 1' (o.g.); Rodionov 13'; Novikov 47'

Kupittaan Jalkapallostadion, Turku
Attendance: 5,642
Referee: Erik Steen Jensen (Denmark)

Spartak Moscow won 4–1 on aggregate.

2 October 1985

Viking (Norway)	1–1	(Poland) Legia Warsaw
Hammer 52'	Report	Dziekanowski 74'

Stavanger Stadion, Stavanger
Attendance: 1,506
Referee: Edward A. Farrell (Republic of Ireland)

Legia Warsaw won 4–1 on aggregate.

2 October 1985

Hammarby (Sweden)	4–0	(Bulgaria) Pirin Blagoevgrad
Ohlsson 33', 78'; Ramberg 69'; Lundin 89'	Report

Söderstadion, Stockholm
Attendance: 3,207
Referee: Keith Cooper (Wales)

Hammarby won 7-1 on aggregate.

2 October 1985

Malmö (Sweden)	3–2	(Hungary) Videoton
Eminovski 51'; Erlandsson 59'; Larsson 65'	Report	Csuhay 16'; Szabó 87'

Malmö Stadion, Malmö
Attendance: 8,788
Referee: Velodi Miminoshvili (Soviet Union)

3–3 on aggregate; Videoton won on away goals.

2 October 1985

PSV Eindhoven (Netherlands)	4–0	(Luxembourg) Avenir Beggen
McDonald 17'; Thoresen 28', 60'; Van der Gijp 43'	Report

Philips Stadion, Eindhoven
Attendance: 9,000
Referee: Alan Snoddy (Northern Ireland)

PSV Eindhoven won 6–0 on aggregate.

2 October 1985

Wacker Innsbruck (Austria)	1–3	(Belgium) RFC Liège
Roscher 18'	Report	Lipka 16'; Thans 39'; De Sart 63'

Tivoli, Innsbruck
Attendance: 10,000
Referee: Lajos Hartmann (Hungary)

RFC Liège won 4-1 on aggregate.

2 October 1985

AGF (Denmark)	0–1	(Belgium) Waregem
	Report	Veyt 87'

Aarhus Stadion, Aarhus
Attendance: 5,200
Referee: Andrzej Libich (Poland)

Waregem won 6–2 on aggregate.

2 October 1985

Nantes (France)	3–0	(Iceland) Valur
Amisse 20', 62'; Touré 53'	Report

La Beaujoire, Nantes
Attendance: 15,723
Referee: Alder Dante Da Silva Santos (Portugal)

Nantes won 4–2 on aggregate.

2 October 1985
20:00

Werder Bremen (West Germany)	3–2	(Soviet Union) Chornomorets Odesa
Kutzop 9'; Pezzey 54'; Neubarth 72'	Report	Pasulko 22'; Morozov 47'

Weserstadion, Bremen
Attendance: 30,100
Referee: Brian McGinlay (Scotland)

4–4 on aggregate; Chornomorets Odesa won on away goals.

2 October 1985

Metz (France)	2–2	(Socialist Federal Republic of Yugoslavia) Hajduk Split
Markov 53'; Zappia 64'	Report	Zl. Vujović 72', 90'

Stade Saint-Symphorien, Metz
Attendance: 10,785
Referee: Luigi Agnolin (Italy)

Hajduk Split won 7–3 on aggregate.

2 October 1985

St. Gallen (Switzerland)	0–0	(Italy) Internazionale
	Report

Espenmoos, St. Gallen
Attendance: 16,200

Internazionale won 5–1 on aggregate.

2 October 1985

Feyenoord (Netherlands)	2–1	(Portugal) Sporting CP
Eriksen 11'; Been 66'	Report	Litos 59'

Feijenoord Stadion, Rotterdam
Attendance: 34,118
Referee: Bogdan Dochev (Bulgaria)

Sporting CP won 4-3 on aggregate.

2 October 1985

Panathinaikos (Greece)	1–1	(Italy) Torino
Saravakos 71' (pen.)	Report	Comi 1'

Olympic Stadium, Athens
Attendance: 73,023

Torino won 3–2 on aggregate.

2 October 1985
20:00

Hamburger SV (West Germany)	2–0 (a.e.t.)	(Netherlands) Sparta Rotterdam
Schröder 76' von Heesen 84'	Report
Penalties
	3–4

Volksparkstadion, Hamburg
Attendance: 27,000
Referee: Zoran Petrović (Yugoslavia)

2–2 on aggregate; Sparta Rotterdam won 4–3 on penalties.

2 October 1985

Club Brugge (Belgium)	3–1	(Portugal) Boavista
Papin 28', 54', 83'	Report	José Coelho 38'

Jan Breydelstadion, Bruges
Attendance: 22,558
Referee: Victoriano Sanchez Arminio (Spain)

Club Brugge won 6–5 on aggregate.

2 October 1985

St Mirren (Scotland)	3–0 (a.e.t.)	(Czechoslovakia) Slavia Prague
Gallacher 42'; McGarvey 100', 108'	Report

Saint Mirren Park, Paisley
Attendance: 11,956
Referee: Rolf Haugen (Norway)

St Mirren won 3-1 on aggregate.

2 October 1985

Dundee United (Scotland)	2–2	(Republic of Ireland) Bohemians
Milne 7'; Redford 32'	Report	Jameson 33'; O'Brien 76'

Tannadice Park, Dundee
Attendance: 7,550
Referee: Henning Lund-Sørensen (Denmark)

Dundee United won 7–4 on aggregate.

2 October 1985

Sporting de Gijón (Spain)	1–2	(West Germany) Köln
Mino 2'	Report	Engels 46'; Dickel 77'

El Molinón, Gijón
Attendance: 33,800
Referee: Franz Wöhrer (Austria)

Köln won 2–1 on aggregate.

2 October 1985

Osasuna (Spain)	2–0	(Scotland) Rangers
Rípodas 13'; Monreal 40'	Report

El Sadar Stadium, Pamplona
Attendance: 25,603
Referee: Joël Quiniou (France)

Osasuna won 2-1 on aggregate.

2 October 1985

Milan (Italy)	3–0	(France) Auxerre
Virdis 28', 82'; Hateley 36'	Report

San Siro, Milan
Attendance: 58,364
Referee: Alexis Ponnet (Belgium)

Milan won 4–3 on aggregate.

2 October 1985

Real Madrid (Spain)	5–0	(Greece) AEK Athens
Georgamlis 8' (o.g.); Butragueño 18'; Chendo 20'; Valdano 32'; Sánchez 59'	Report

Santiago Bernabéu, Madrid
Attendance: 60,000
Referee: Alain Delmer (France)

Real Madrid won 5–1 on aggregate.

3 October 1985

Beşiktaş (Turkey)	0–1	(Spain) Athletic Bilbao
	Report	Noriega 12'

BJK İnönü Stadyumu, Istanbul
Attendance: 9,200
Referee: Claudio Pieri (Italy)

Athletic Bilbao won 5–1 on aggregate.

2 October 1985

Sportul Studențesc (Romania)	4–4	(Switzerland) Neuchâtel Xamax
Hagi 3', 41' (pen.), 84' (pen.); Sandu 23'	Report	Ryf 9'; Lüthi 20'; Givens 50'; Stielike 73'

Stadionul Sportul, Bucharest
Attendance: 7,500
Referee: Keith Hackett (England)

Neuchâtel Xamax won 7-4 on aggregate.

== Second round ==
Team 1	Agg.	Team 2	1st leg	2nd leg
Köln (West Germany)	8–2	(Czechoslovakia) Bohemians Praha	4–0	4–2
Milan (Italy)	3–3 (a)	(East Germany) Lokomotive Leipzig	2–0	1–3
Dundee United (Scotland)	3–1	(Socialist Federal Republic of Yugoslavia) Vardar	2–0	1–1
Spartak Moscow (Soviet Union)	4–1	(Belgium) Club Brugge	1–0	3–1
Partizan (Socialist Federal Republic of Yugoslavia)	1–5	(France) Nantes	1–1	0–4
Hammarby (Sweden)	5–4	(Scotland) St Mirren	3–3	2–1
Waregem (Belgium)	3–2	(Spain) Osasuna	2–0	1–2
Dinamo Tirana (Albania)	0–1	(Portugal) Sporting CP	0–0	0–1
LASK (Austria)	1–4	(Italy) Internazionale	1–0	0–4
Lokomotiv Sofia (Bulgaria)	1–1 (a)	(Switzerland) Neuchâtel Xamax	1–1	0–0
PSV Eindhoven (Netherlands)	2–3	(Soviet Union) Dnipro	2–2	0–1
RFC Liège (Belgium)	1–4	(Spain) Athletic Bilbao	0–1	1–3
Real Madrid (Spain)	2–1	(Soviet Union) Chornomorets Odesa	2–1	0–0
Sparta Rotterdam (Netherlands)	2–6	(West Germany) Borussia Mönchengladbach	1–1	1–5
Torino (Italy)	2–4	(Socialist Federal Republic of Yugoslavia) Hajduk Split	1–1	1–3
Videoton (Hungary)	1–2	(Poland) Legia Warsaw	0–1	1–1

=== First leg ===
23 October 1985

Lokomotiv Sofia (Bulgaria)	1–1	(Switzerland) Neuchâtel Xamax
Bontchev 75'	Report	Perret 36'

Lokomotiv Stadium, Sofia
Attendance: 8,000
Referee: Michel Vautrot (France)

23 October 1985

Dinamo Tirana (Albania)	0–0	(Portugal) Sporting CP
	Report

Qemal Stafa Stadium, Tirana
Attendance: 15,000
Referee: Radu Petrescu (Romania)

23 October 1985

Videoton (Hungary)	0–1	(Poland) Legia Warsaw
	Report	Araszkiewicz 89'

Sóstói Stadion, Székesfehérvár
Attendance: 15,000
Referee: Jean-François Crucke (Belgium)

23 October 1985

Spartak Moscow (Soviet Union)	1–0	(Belgium) Club Brugge
Cherenkov 45'	Report

Central Lenin Stadium, Moscow
Attendance: 27,300
Referee: Carlos Valente (Portugal)

23 October 1985

Partizan (Socialist Federal Republic of Yugoslavia)	1–1	(France) Nantes
Le Roux 28' (o.g.)	Report	Halilhodžić 68'

Stadion Partizan, Belgrade
Attendance: 47,815
Referee: Paolo Bergamo (Italy)

23 October 1985

Hammarby (Sweden)	3–3	(Scotland) St Mirren
Lundin 33'; Andersson 45', 65'	Report	Gallacher 40', 80', 84'

Söderstadion, Stockholm
Attendance: 4,100
Referee: Dušan Krchnak (Czechoslovakia)

23 October 1985

LASK (Austria)	1–0	(Italy) Internazionale
Gröss 81'	Report

Linzer Stadion, Linz
Attendance: 18,500

23 October 1985
19:00

PSV Eindhoven (Netherlands)	2–2	(Soviet Union) Dnipro
McDonald 54'; Thoresen 79'	Report	Protasov 17', 67'

Philips Stadion, Eindhoven
Attendance: 18,000
Referee: Neil Midgley (England)

23 October 1985

Köln (West Germany)	4–0	(Czechoslovakia) Bohemians Praha
Littbarski 10', 82'; Geils 13'; Van de Korput 52'	Report

Müngersdorfer Stadion, Cologne
Attendance: 12,000
Referee: Ioan Igna (Romania)

23 October 1985

RFC Liège (Belgium)	0–1	(Spain) Athletic Bilbao
	Report	De Andres 90'

Stade Vélodrome de Rocourt, Rocourt
Attendance: 14,500
Referee: Alain Delmer (France)

23 October 1985
20:00

Sparta Rotterdam (Netherlands)	1–1	(West Germany) Borussia Mönchengladbach
E. Olde Riekerink 47'	Report	Pinkall 58'

Feijenoord Stadion, Rotterdam
Attendance: 24,693
Referee: Ángel Franco Martínez (Spain)

23 October 1985

Waregem (Belgium)	2–0	(Spain) Osasuna
Desloover 13'; Veyt 58'	Report

Regenboogstadion, Waregem
Attendance: 9,043
Referee: Raul J. Fernandes Nazare (Portugal)

23 October 1985

Dundee United (Scotland)	2–0	(Socialist Federal Republic of Yugoslavia) Vardar
Redford 53'; Gough 78'	Report

Tannadice Park, Dundee
Attendance: 9,129
Referee: Bernd Stumpf (East Germany)

23 October 1985

Milan (Italy)	2–0	(East Germany) Lokomotive Leipzig
Virdis 74' (pen.); Hateley 76'	Report

San Siro, Milan
Attendance: 58,803
Referee: Franz Wöhrer (Austria)

23 October 1985

Torino (Italy)	1–1	(Socialist Federal Republic of Yugoslavia) Hajduk Split
Schachner 74'	Report	Slišković 33'

Stadio Comunale, Turin
Attendance: 40,993
Referee: Alexis Ponnet (Belgium)

23 October 1985
21:00

Real Madrid (Spain)	2–1	(Soviet Union) Chornomorets Odesa
Gordillo 1'; Valdano 71'	Report	Bagapov 7'

Santiago Bernabéu, Madrid
Attendance: 60,000
Referee: Keith Hackett (England)

=== Second leg ===
6 November 1985

Vardar (Socialist Federal Republic of Yugoslavia)	1–1	(Scotland) Dundee United
Pančev 24'	Report	Hegarty 14'

Philip II Arena, Skopje
Attendance: 22,300
Referee: Laszlo Padar (Hungary)

Dundee United won 3–1 on aggregate.

6 November 1985
15:00

Chornomorets Odesa (Soviet Union)	0–0	(Spain) Real Madrid
	Report

ChMP Central Stadium, Odessa
Attendance: 41,535
Referee: Ulf Eriksson (Sweden)

Real Madrid won 2–1 on aggregate.

6 November 1985

Legia Warsaw (Poland)	1–1	(Hungary) Videoton
Dziekanowski 75'	Report	Novath 34'

Stadion Wojska Polskiego, Warsaw
Attendance: 13,500
Referee: Emilio Soriano Aladrén (Spain)

Legia Warsaw won 2–1 on aggregate.

6 November 1985

Bohemians Praha (Czechoslovakia)	2–4	(West Germany) Köln
Janečka 16' (pen.); Mičinec 87'	Report	Mennie 5'; Dickel 33', 75'; Littbarski 60'

Ďolíček, Prague
Attendance: 5,889
Referee: Jan Keizer (Netherlands)

Köln won 8–2 on aggregate.

6 November 1985

Hajduk Split (Socialist Federal Republic of Yugoslavia)	3–1	(Italy) Torino
Asanović 2'; Slišković 29'; Zl. Vujović 55' (pen.)	Report	Júnior 15' (pen.)

Stadion Poljud, Split
Attendance: 40,000
Referee: Karl-Heinz Tritschler (West Germany)

Hajduk Split won 4–2 on aggregate.

6 November 1985
19:00

Dnipro (Soviet Union)	1–0	(Netherlands) PSV Eindhoven
Lytovchenko 47'	Report

Stadion Metalurh, Kryvyi Rih
Attendance: 34,000
Referee: Franz Gächter (Switzerland)

Dnipro won 3–2 on aggregate.

6 November 1985

Neuchâtel Xamax (Switzerland)	0–0	(Bulgaria) Lokomotiv Sofia
	Report

La Maladière, Neuchâtel
Attendance: 17,200
Referee: Gerald Losert (Austria)

1–1 on aggregate; Neuchâtel Xamax won on away goals.

6 November 1985

Lokomotive Leipzig (East Germany)	3–1	(Italy) Milan
Moldt 6'; Leitzke 21'; Richter 76'	Report	Virdis 48'

Zentralstadion, Leipzig
Attendance: 18,300
Referee: Eduard Šoštarić (Yugoslavia)

3–3 on aggregate; Milan won on away goals.

6 November 1985

Nantes (France)	4–0	(Socialist Federal Republic of Yugoslavia) Partizan
Jorge Burruchaga 14'; Amisse 51', 88'; Bracigliano 57'	Report

La Beaujoire, Nantes
Attendance: 29,003
Referee: Dieter Pauly (West Germany)

Nantes won 5–1 on aggregate.

6 November 1985
20:00

Borussia Mönchengladbach (West Germany)	5–1	(Netherlands) Sparta Rotterdam
Rahn 11', 12'; Pinkall 33'; Herbst 68'; Criens 89'	Report	Diliberto 39'

Bökelbergstadion, Mönchengladbach
Attendance: 21,000
Referee: Erik Fredriksson (Sweden)

Borussia Mönchengladbach won 6–2 on aggregate.

6 November 1985

Club Brugge (Belgium)	1–3	(Soviet Union) Spartak Moscow
Papin 52'	Report	Bubnov 28'; Rodionov 51'; Shavlo 65'

Jan Breydel Stadium, Bruges
Attendance: 22,831
Referee: Bo Helen (Sweden)

Spartak Moscow won 4–1 on aggregate.

6 November 1985

Athletic Bilbao (Spain)	3–1	(Belgium) RFC Liège
Urtubi 33'; Noriega 52', 70'	Report	Ernes 80'

Estadio de San Mamés, Bilbao
Attendance: 28,000
Referee: Adolf Prokop (East Germany)

Athletic Bilbao won 4–1 on aggregate.

6 November 1985

St Mirren (Scotland)	1-2	(Sweden) Hammarby
McGarvey 21'	Report	Ivarsson 85'; Lundin 88'

St Mirren Park, Paisley
Attendance: 11,278
Referee: Ib. F. Nielsen (Denmark)

Hammarby won 5–4 on aggregate.

6 November 1985

Internazionale (Italy)	4–0	(Austria) LASK
Brady 20' (pen.); Altobelli 32', 80', 81'	Report

San Siro, Milan
Attendance: 42,856

Internazionale won 4–1 on aggregate.

6 November 1985

Osasuna (Spain)	2–1	(Belgium) Waregem
Orejuela 6'; Sola 9'	Report	Veyt 62'

El Sadar Stadium, Pamplona
Attendance: 19,115
Referee: Luigi Agnolin (Italy)

Waregem won 3–2 on aggregate.

6 November 1985

Sporting CP (Portugal)	1–0	(Albania) Dinamo Tirana
Venâncio 53'	Report

José Alvalade, Lisbon
Attendance: 35,000
Referee: Eamonn Farrell (Republic of Ireland)

Sporting CP won 1–0 on aggregate.

== Third round ==
Team 1	Agg.	Team 2	1st leg	2nd leg
Athletic Bilbao (Spain)	2–4	(Portugal) Sporting CP	2–1	0–3
Borussia Mönchengladbach (West Germany)	5–5 (a)	(Spain) Real Madrid	5–1	0–4
Dundee United (Scotland)	3–4	(Switzerland) Neuchâtel Xamax	2–1	1–3 (a.e.t.)
Dnipro (Soviet Union)	0–3	(Socialist Federal Republic of Yugoslavia) Hajduk Split	0–1	0–2
Spartak Moscow (Soviet Union)	1–2	(France) Nantes	0–1	1–1
Hammarby (Sweden)	3–4	(West Germany) Köln	2–1	1–3
Internazionale (Italy)	1–0	(Poland) Legia Warsaw	0–0	1–0 (a.e.t.)
Waregem (Belgium)	3–2	(Italy) Milan	1–1	2–1

=== First leg ===
27 November 1985

Spartak Moscow (Soviet Union)	0–1	(France) Nantes
	Report	Morice 77'

Lenin Dinamo Stadium, Tbilisi
Attendance: 48,500
Referee: Neil Midgley (England)

27 November 1985
19:00

Dnipro (Soviet Union)	0–1	(Socialist Federal Republic of Yugoslavia) Hajduk Split
	Report	Puchkov 78' (o.g.)

Stadion Metalurh, Kryvyi Rih
Attendance: 24,500
Referee: Ioan Igna (Romania)

27 November 1985

Hammarby (Sweden)	2–1	(West Germany) Köln
Holmberg 70', 88'	Report	Geilenkirchen 31'

Råsunda Stadium, Stockholm
Attendance: 9,054
Referee: Ronald Bridges (Wales)

27 November 1985

Waregem (Belgium)	1–1	(Italy) Milan
Veyt 63'	Report	Virdis 88'

Regenboogstadion, Waregem
Attendance: 9,000
Referee: Aron Schmidhuber (West Germany)

27 November 1985

Borussia Mönchengladbach (West Germany)	5–1	(Spain) Real Madrid
Mill 29'; Salguero 40' (o.g.); Criens 55'; Rahn 59'; Lienen 81'	Report	Gordillo 68'

Rheinstadion, Düsseldorf
Attendance: 65,000
Referee: Luigi Agnolin (Italy)

27 November 1985

Athletic Bilbao (Spain)	2–1	(Portugal) Sporting CP
Sarabia 13'; Salinas 58'	Report	Meade 72'

San Mamés, Bilbao
Attendance: 30,000
Referee: André Daina (Switzerland)

27 November 1985

Dundee United (Scotland)	2–1	(Switzerland) Neuchâtel Xamax
Dodds 53'; Redford 75'	Report	Stielike 22'

Tannadice Park, Dundee
Attendance: 10,633
Referee: Marcel Van Langenhove (Belgium)

27 November 1985

Internazionale (Italy)	0–0	(Poland) Legia Warsaw
	Report

San Siro, Milan
Attendance: 33,965

=== Second leg ===
11 December 1985

Hajduk Split (Socialist Federal Republic of Yugoslavia)	2–0	(Soviet Union) Dnipro
Gudelj 47', 64'	Report

Stadion Poljud, Split
Attendance: 27,000
Referee: Ángel Franco Martínez (Spain)

Hajduk Split won 3–0 on aggregate.

11 December 1985

Legia Warsaw (Poland)	0–1 (a.e.t.)	(Italy) Internazionale
	Report	Fanna 108'

Stadion Wojska Polskiego, Warsaw
Attendance: 19,500

Internazionale won 1–0 on aggregate.

11 December 1985

Köln (West Germany)	3–1	(Sweden) Hammarby
Littbarski 38'; Allofs 65'; Bein 86'	Report	Andersson 35'

Müngersdorfer Stadion, Cologne
Attendance: 12,000
Referee: Joël Quiniou (France)

Köln won 4–3 on aggregate.

11 December 1985

Nantes (France)	1–1	(Soviet Union) Spartak Moscow
Touré 68'	Report	Cherenkov 67'

La Beaujoire, Nantes
Attendance: 40,500
Referee: Helmut Kohl (Austria)

Nantes won 2–1 on aggregate.

11 December 1985

Neuchâtel Xamax (Switzerland)	3–1 (a.e.t.)	(Scotland) Dundee United
Nielsen 39', 109'; Hermann 55'	Report	Redford 17'

La Maladière, Neuchâtel
Attendance: 17,400
Referee: José Rosa dos Santos (Portugal)

Neuchâtel Xamax won 4–3 on aggregate.

11 December 1985

Milan (Italy)	1–2	(Belgium) Waregem
Bortolazzi 37'	Report	Desmet 44' (pen.); Veyt 67'

San Siro, Milan
Attendance: 43,347
Referee: Vojtěch Christov (Czechoslovakia)

Following the referee's controversial decision to award Waregem a penalty in the 44th minute as the foul looked to be outside of the penalty area, Milan fans pelted the pitch with missiles some of which hit several Waregem players. Following the match, as a result of the incident, AC Milan received a two-match European competition stadium ban, enforced at the start of their 1987–88 UEFA Cup campaign.
Waregem won 3–2 on aggregate.

11 December 1985

Real Madrid (Spain)	4–0	(West Germany) Borussia Mönchengladbach
Valdano 5', 17'; Santillana 76', 88'	Report

Santiago Bernabéu, Madrid
Attendance: 78,000
Referee: Brian McGinlay (Scotland)

5–5 on aggregate; Real Madrid won on away goals.

11 December 1985

Sporting CP (Portugal)	3–0	(Spain) Athletic Bilbao
Manuel Fernandes 20' (pen.); Meade 56'; António Sousa 74'	Report

José Alvalade, Lisbon
Attendance: 50,000
Referee: Jan Keizer (Netherlands)

Sporting CP won 4–2 on aggregate.

== Quarter-finals ==
Team 1	Agg.	Team 2	1st leg	2nd leg
Hajduk Split (Socialist Federal Republic of Yugoslavia)	1–1 (4–5 p)	(Belgium) Waregem	1–0	0–1 (a.e.t.)
Internazionale (Italy)	6–3	(France) Nantes	3–0	3–3
Real Madrid (Spain)	3–2	(Switzerland) Neuchâtel Xamax	3–0	0–2
Sporting CP (Portugal)	1–3	(West Germany) Köln	1–1	0–2

=== First leg ===
4 March 1986

Sporting CP (Portugal)	1–1	(West Germany) Köln
Meade 55'	Report	Allofs 89'

José Alvalade, Lisbon
Attendance: 40,000
Referee: George Courtney

5 March 1986

Hajduk Split (Socialist Federal Republic of Yugoslavia)	1–0	(Belgium) Waregem
Zl. Vujović 9'	Report

Stadion Poljud, Split
Attendance: 40,000
Referee: Valeri Butenko (Soviet Union)

5 March 1986

Internazionale (Italy)	3–0	(France) Nantes
Le Roux 13' (o.g.); Tardelli 61'; Rummenigge 78'	Report

San Siro, Milan
Attendance: 42,234

5 March 1986

Real Madrid (Spain)	3–0	(Switzerland) Neuchâtel Xamax
Sánchez 32'; Míchel 74'; Butragueño 85'	Report

Santiago Bernabéu, Madrid
Attendance: 75,000
Referee: Zoran Petrović

=== Second leg ===
18 March 1986

Köln (West Germany)	2–0	(Portugal) Sporting CP
Allofs 7'; Bein 37'	Report

Müngersdorfer Stadion, Cologne
Attendance: 37,000
Referee: Paolo Casarin (Italy)

Köln won 3–1 on aggregate.

19 March 1986

Waregem (Belgium)	1–0 (a.e.t.)	(Socialist Federal Republic of Yugoslavia) Hajduk Split
Mutombo 60'	Report
Penalties
	5–4

Regenboogstadion, Waregem
Attendance: 10,908
Referee: José Rosa dos Santos (Portugal)

1–1 on aggregate; Waregem won 5–4 on penalties.

19 March 1986

Nantes (France)	3–3	(Italy) Internazionale
Der Zakarian 9'; Halilhodžić 37'; Le Roux 42'	Report	Altobelli 33', 64'; Brady 59' (pen.)

La Beaujoire, Nantes
Attendance: 37,782

Internazionale won 6–3 on aggregate.

19 March 1986

Neuchâtel Xamax (Switzerland)	2–0	(Spain) Real Madrid
Stielike 11'; Jacobacci 90'	Report

La Maladière, Neuchâtel
Attendance: 25,500
Referee: Karl-Heinz Tritschler

Real Madrid won 3–2 on aggregate.

== Semi-finals ==
Team 1	Agg.	Team 2	1st leg	2nd leg
Köln (West Germany)	7–3	(Belgium) Waregem	4–0	3–3
Internazionale (Italy)	4–6	(Spain) Real Madrid	3–1	1–5 (a.e.t.)

=== First leg ===
2 April 1986

Köln (West Germany)	4–0	(Belgium) Waregem
Lehnhoff 41'; Allofs 50', 66' (pen.); Geilenkirchen 79'	Report

Müngersdorfer Stadion, Cologne
Attendance: 48,000
Referee: André Daina (Switzerland)

2 April 1986

Internazionale (Italy)	3–1	(Spain) Real Madrid
Tardelli 1', 54'; Salguero 89' (o.g.)	Report	Valdano 87'

San Siro, Milan
Attendance: 70,616
Referee: Erik Fredriksson (Sweden)

=== Second leg ===
16 April 1986

Waregem (Belgium)	3–3	(West Germany) Köln
Mutombo 53', 60'; Görtz 78'	Report	Allofs 25', 35', 68' (pen.)

Guldensporenstadion, Courtrai
Attendance: 8,800
Referee: Horst Brummeier (Austria)

Köln won 7–3 on aggregate.

16 April 1986

Real Madrid (Spain)	5–1 (a.e.t.)	(Italy) Internazionale
Hugo Sánchez 43' (pen.), 74' (pen.); Gordillo 64'; Santillana 93', 108'	Report	Brady 66' (pen.)

Santiago Bernabéu Stadium, Madrid
Attendance: 86,000
Referee: Jan Keizer (Netherlands)

Real Madrid won 6–4 on aggregate.

== Final ==
=== First leg ===
30 April 1986

Real Madrid (Spain)	5–1	(West Germany) Köln
Sánchez 38'; Gordillo 42'; Valdano 51', 84'; Santillana 89'	Report	Allofs 29'

Santiago Bernabéu, Madrid
Attendance: 65,000
Referee: George Courtney (England)

=== Second leg ===
6 May 1986

Köln (West Germany)	2–0	(Spain) Real Madrid
Bein 22'; Geilenkirchen 72'	Report

Olympiastadion, West Berlin
Attendance: 21,185
Referee: Bob Valentine (Scotland)

Real Madrid won 5–3 on aggregate.
