= 1984–85 Czechoslovak First League =

Czechoslovak First League
- Season: 1984–85
- Champions: Sparta Prague
- Relegated: ZŤS Petržalka; Slovan Bratislava
- European Cup: Sparta Prague
- Cup Winners' Cup: Dukla Prague
- UEFA Cup: Bohemians Prague; Slavia Prague; Baník Ostrava
- Top goalscorer: Ivo Knoflíček (21 goals)

Statistics of Czechoslovak First League in the 1984–85 season.

== Overview ==
It was contested by 16 teams, and Sparta Prague won the championship. Ivo Knoflíček was the league's top scorer with 21 goals.

== Stadia and locations ==
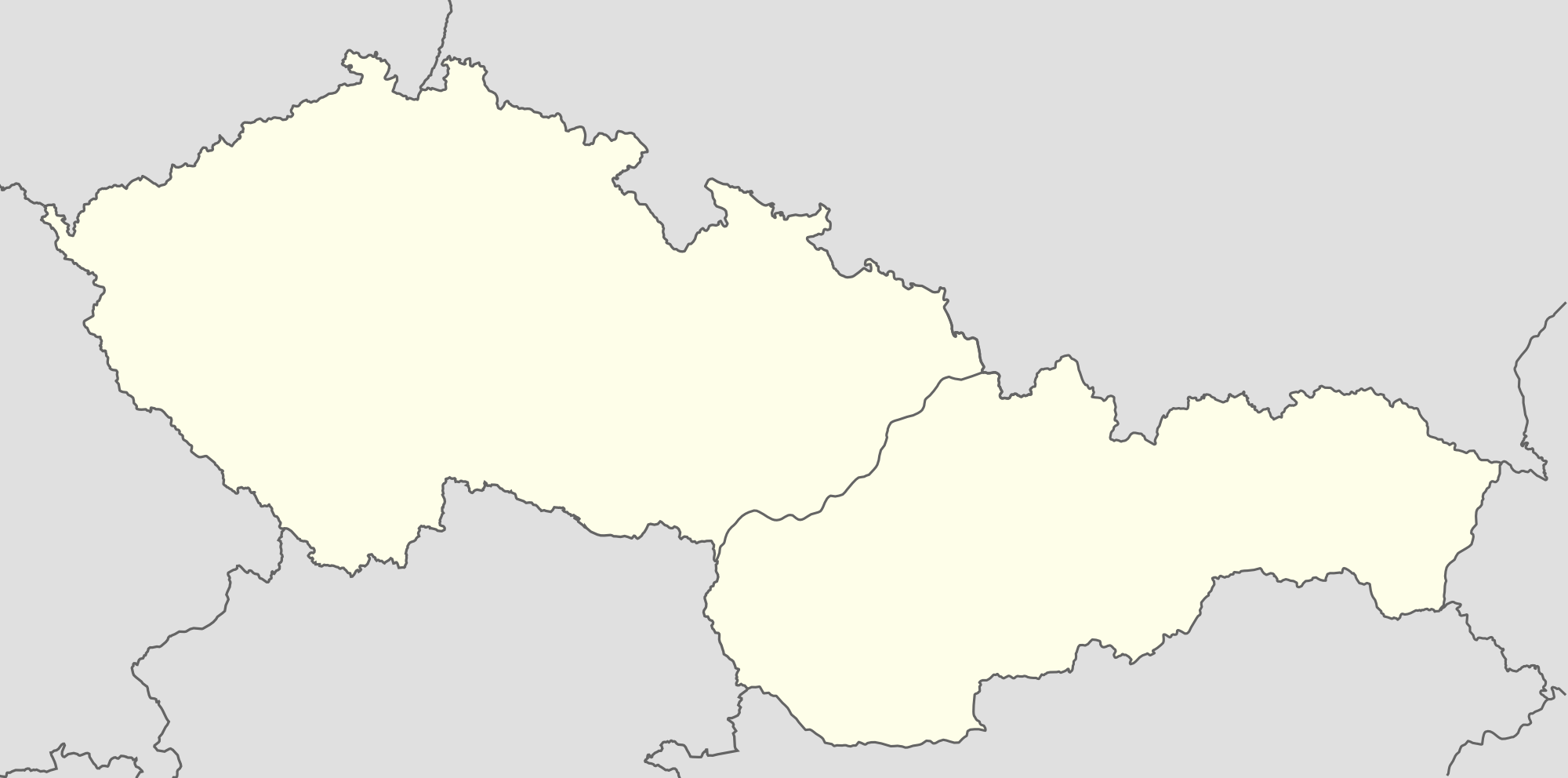
Location of clubs in the 1984–85 Czechoslovak First League

== League standings ==
Pos	Team	Pld	W	D	L	GF	GA	GD	Pts	Qualification or relegation
1	Sparta Prague (C)	30	19	5	6	64	24	+40	43	Qualification for European Cup first round
2	Bohemians Prague	30	17	9	4	58	26	+32	43	Qualification for UEFA Cup first round
3	Slavia Prague	30	16	7	7	59	33	+26	39	Qualification for UEFA Cup first round
4	Baník Ostrava	30	14	11	5	41	23	+18	39	Qualification for UEFA Cup first round
5	Dukla Prague	30	13	6	11	51	40	+11	32	Qualification for Cup Winners' Cup first round
6	Sigma Olomouc	30	10	11	9	50	47	+3	31	
7	Dukla Banská Bystrica	30	15	1	14	38	44	−6	31	
8	RH Cheb	30	12	6	12	44	38	+6	30	
9	Spartak Trnava	30	10	9	11	33	39	−6	29	
10	Lokomotíva Košice	30	9	9	12	34	44	−10	27	
11	Vítkovice	30	8	10	12	30	41	−11	26	
12	Tatran Prešov	30	9	6	15	28	46	−18	24	
13	Inter Bratislava	30	7	9	14	25	34	−9	23	
14	ZVL Žilina	30	8	7	15	26	49	−23	23	
15	Petržalka (R)	30	6	9	15	29	47	−18	21	Relegation to Slovak National Football League
16	Slovan Bratislava (R)	30	6	7	17	24	59	−35	19	Relegation to Slovak National Football League

Source: rsssf.com
(C) Champions; (R) Relegated

== Results ==
Home \ Away	OST	BOH	BB	DUK	INT	LOK	PET	CHE	OLO	SLA	SLO	SPA	TRN	PRE	VÍT	ŽIL
Baník Ostrava		2–2	2–1	1–0	1–1	1–0	2–0	2–1	0–0	3–0	3–0	2–1	3–1	4–1	2–0	1–0
Bohemians Prague	2–1		4–0	3–1	3–1	0–2	4–1	1–0	5–1	2–0	5–0	0–0	0–1	1–0	1–1	2–1
Dukla Banská Bystrica	1–0	2–3		1–0	1–0	4–0	3–1	1–0	5–0	1–0	1–0	1–0	2–1	2–0	1–2	1–2
Dukla Prague	2–4	1–1	6–1		2–1	5–1	0–0	4–2	2–0	2–1	7–1	1–4	2–1	1–0	0–0	5–0
Inter Bratislava	2–1	1–1	1–0	0–1		2–0	1–1	0–0	1–0	0–1	1–2	1–2	2–0	2–1	0–1	1–0
Lokomotiva Košice	1–1	1–0	1–0	1–2	2–0		3–1	2–1	1–3	2–1	0–0	1–1	0–0	2–2	4–0	4–0
Petržalka	1–1	0–2	0–1	1–1	2–1	2–0		3–0	1–1	0–5	0–0	1–2	0–0	1–1	2–0	4–0
RH Cheb	0–1	1–4	1–1	2–0	1–1	2–1	3–0		3–1	1–1	2–1	1–2	1–1	1–0	1–0	5–0
Sigma Olomouc	1–1	1–1	4–1	1–1	2–2	5–1	2–0	0–4		2–2	6–1	0–0	4–1	4–1	2–0	2–1
Slavia Prague	0–0	0–1	7–0	2–1	1–0	2–0	3–2	4–3	3–1		6–0	0–2	4–1	3–1	3–2	0–0
Slovan Bratislava	0–0	0–1	1–2	0–2	0–0	3–3	3–2	1–2	1–1	0–2		2–0	1–2	1–0	1–0	2–0
Sparta Prague	3–2	1–3	5–0	1–0	1–1	3–0	3–0	2–0	2–0	2–0	2–1		2–1	7–0	6–0	5–0
Spartak Trnava	0–0	1–3	1–0	1–1	2–0	2–0	2–0	0–2	0–0	3–3	2–1	0–1		3–2	0–0	1–0
Tatran Prešov	0–0	2–1	1–0	3–0	1–0	0–0	1–0	1–0	2–3	0–2	3–0	2–1	2–2		1–0	0–0
Vítkovice	2–0	2–2	1–0	5–1	0–0	1–1	0–0	2–2	2–2	1–2	1–1	2–3	2–1	1–0		1–0
ZVL Žilina	0–0	0–0	0–4	1–0	4–2	0–0	3–2	1–2	2–1	0–0	3–0	1–1	1–2	4–0	2–1	

Source: statistiky1ligy.fotbal.cz
Legend: Blue = home team win; Yellow = draw; Red = away team win.

== Attendances ==
#	Club	Average	Highest
1	Sparta Praha	13,727	23,836
2	Sigma Olomouc	9,576	13,596
3	Slavia Praha	9,112	16,316
4	Bohemians	7,072	13,089
5	Ostrava	6,406	14,623
6	Spartak Trnava	4,900	8,464
7	Dukla Banská Bystrica	4,533	10,037
8	Cheb	4,441	8,711
9	Petržalka	4,269	6,184
10	Vítkovice	4,179	11,320
11	Žilina	3,290	6,495
12	Košice	3,192	11,642
13	Slovan	3,063	5,284
14	Dukla Praha	2,955	10,058
15	Tatran Prešov	2,738	4,080
16	Inter Bratislava	2,672	7,047
