= Karlheinz Geils =

German footballer

Personal information
- Date of birth: 20 May 1955 (age 71)
- Place of birth: Ritterhude, West Germany
- Height: 1.82 m (6 ft 0 in)
- Positions: Defender; midfielder

Senior career*
Years	Team	Apps	(Gls)
1974–1980	Werder Bremen	132	(2)
1980–1984	Arminia Bielefeld	131	(16)
1984–1987	1. FC Köln	81	(3)
1987–1990	Hannover 96	96	(3)
Total		440	(24)
- * Club domestic league appearances and goals

Karlheinz Geils (born 20 May 1955) is a German former footballer who played as a defender or midfielder.

He played 405 games in the Bundesliga for SV Werder Bremen, DSC Arminia Bielefeld, 1. FC Köln and Hannoverscher SV 96.

== Honours ==
1. FC Köln

- UEFA Cup finalist: 1985–86
