= Thomas Lundin =

Swedish football manager

Managerial career
- Years: Team
- 1992: Djurgårdens IF

Thomas Lundin is a Swedish football manager. He was Djurgårdens IF manager in 1992.
