= Mathias Hönerbach =

German footballer and manager

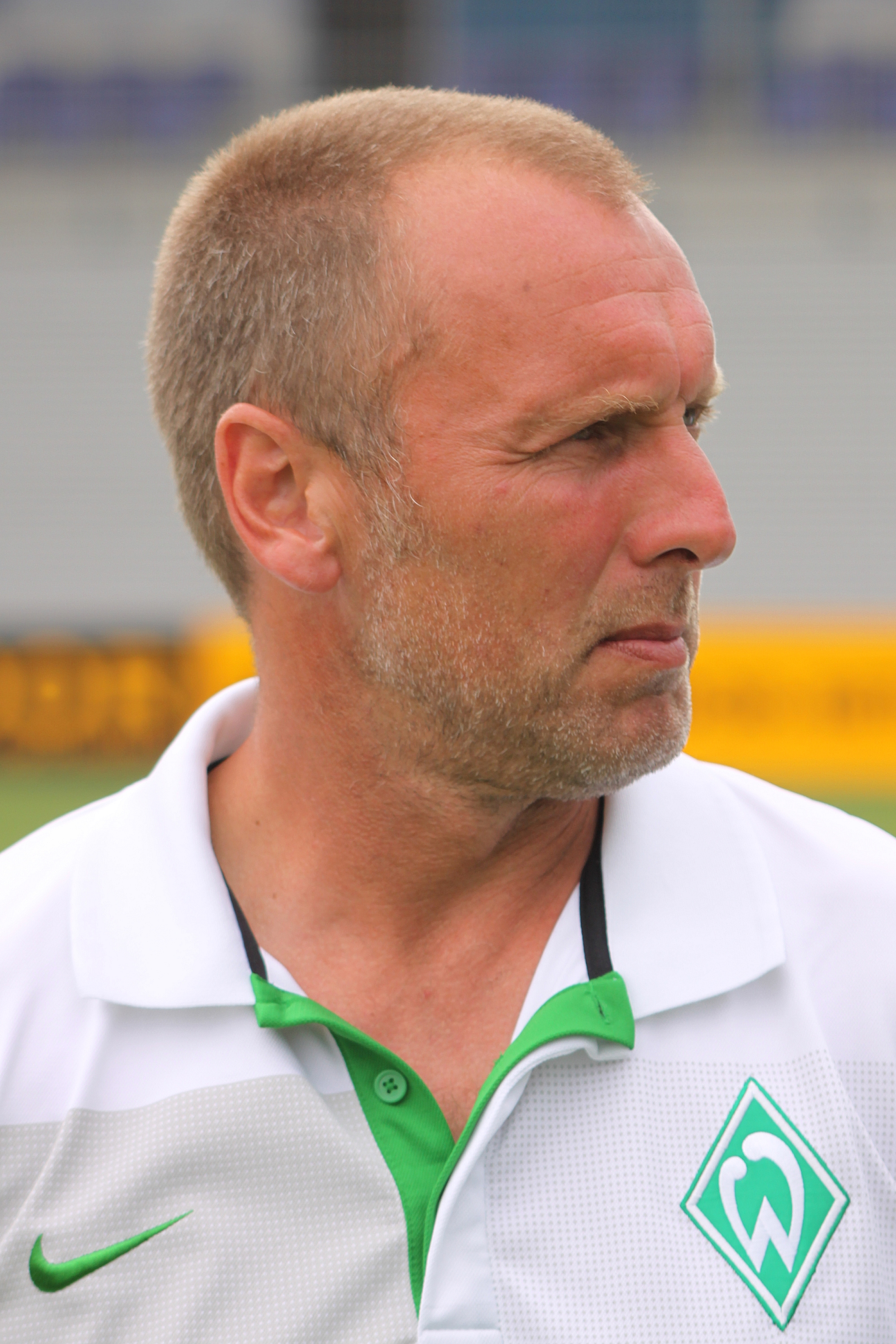

Personal information
- Date of birth: 13 April 1962 (age 64)
- Place of birth: Cologne, West Germany
- Height: 1.75 m (5 ft 9 in)
- Position: Defender

Youth career
- Bayer 04 Leverkusen

Senior career*
Years	Team	Apps	(Gls)
1980–1981	Bayer 04 Leverkusen	0	(0)
1981–1989	1. FC Köln	184	(4)
1989–1994	1. FC Saarbrücken	103	(2)

International career
1983	Germany U-21	2	(0)

Managerial career
- 1994–1995: SV Eintracht Trier 05 (assistant)
- 1995–1996: 1. FC Köln II
- 1996–2005: Viktoria Köln
- 2005–2013: SV Werder Bremen (assistant)
- 2014–2015: Eintracht Frankfurt (assistant)
- * Club domestic league appearances and goals

Mathias Hönerbach (born 13 April 1962) is a German football coach and a former player.

== Honours ==
- UEFA Cup finalist: 1985–86
- DFB-Pokal winner: 1982–83
- Bundesliga runner-up: 1981–82, 1988–89
