= Rocky O'Brien =

Irish footballer

David "Rocky" O'Brien (born 6 May 1963) was an Irish soccer player who played as a midfielder.

He represented Bohemians and Sligo Rovers during his League of Ireland career. He was one of the most popular Bohemians players during the 1980s and scored four goals in six appearances in European competition during this time. He is most famous for scoring twice in a 3–2 win over Rangers in September 1984 in the UEFA Cup. Also scored twice against Dundee United in the same competition the following season.

He signed for Bohemians from schoolboy club Cambridge Boys and made his league debut in September 1981 against Sligo Rovers. He made 190 league appearances for Bohemians, scoring 33 goals before moving to Sligo at the end of the 1989–90 season.

In April 1983 he played for the League of Ireland XI U21s against their Italian League counterparts who included Roberto Mancini and Gianluca Vialli in their team.

As of 2 October 2009, O'Brien was manager of Belgrove in the Leinster Senior League.

O'Brien earned four caps for the Republic of Ireland U21 side.
