= Georg Keßler =

German football manager

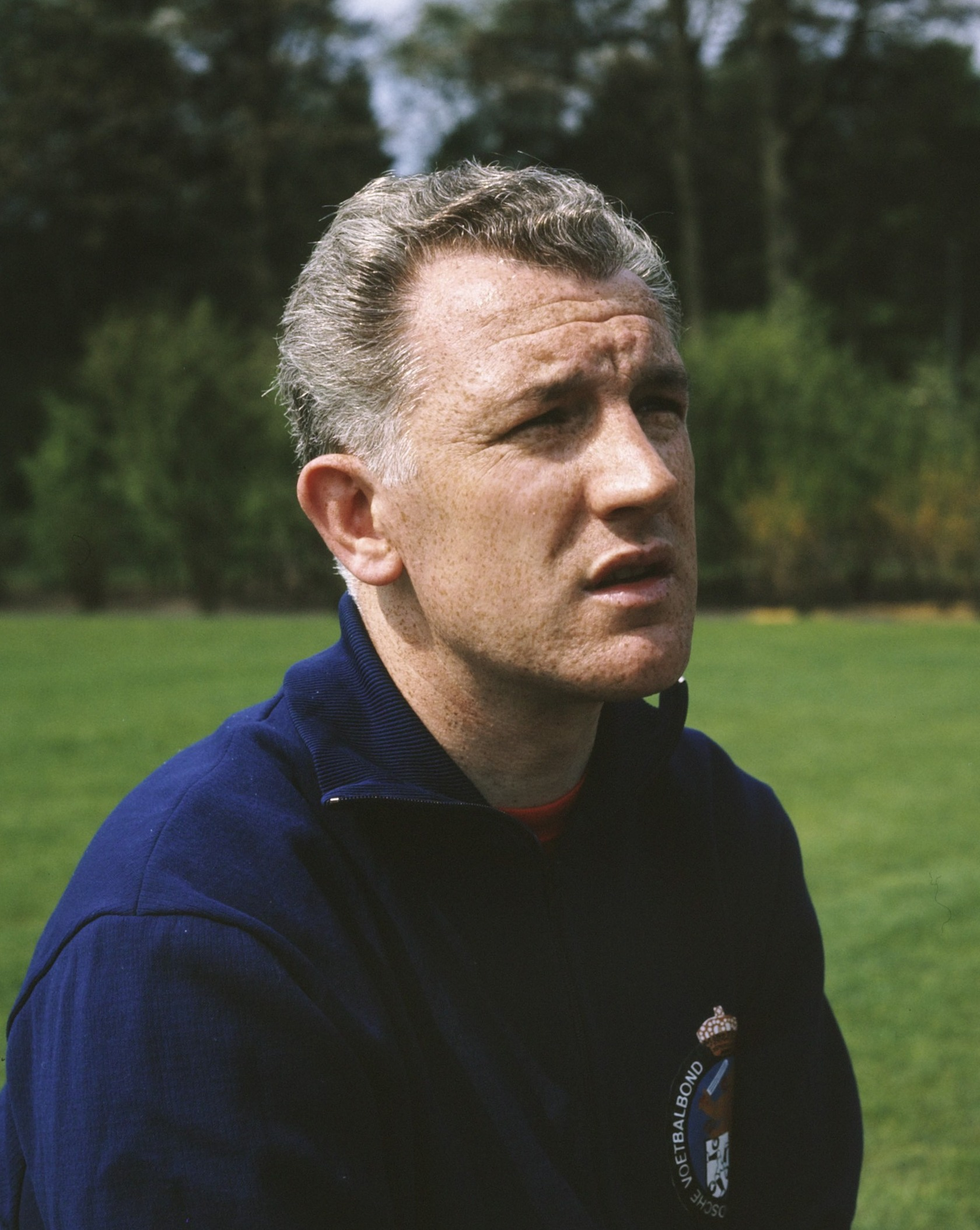
- Keßler in 1968

Personal information
- Date of birth: 23 September 1932 (age 94)
- Place of birth: Saarbrücken, Weimar Germany

Senior career*
Years	Team	Apps	(Gls)
- Sittardse Boys
- SV Maurits

Managerial career
- 1966–1970: Netherlands
- 1970–1971: Sparta Rotterdam
- 1971–1972: Anderlecht
- 1972–1974: PEC Zwolle
- 1974–1977: Hertha BSC
- 1977–1978: Wacker Innsbruck
- 1978–1982: AZ
- 1982–1984: Club Brugge
- 1984–1985: Olympiacos
- 1986: 1. FC Köln
- 1986–1989: Royal Antwerp
- 1989–1990: Standard de Liège
- 1991–1992: Fortuna Sittard
- 1996–1998: Royal Antwerp
- * Club domestic league appearances and goals

Georg Kessler (born 23 September 1932) is a German former football manager.

== Honours ==
Sparta Rotterdam

- KNVB Cup runner-up: 1970–71

Anderlecht

- Belgian First Division: 1971–72
- Belgian Cup: 1971–72

Hertha BSC

- DFB-Pokal runner-up: 1976–77

Wacker Innsbruck

- Austrian Cup: 1977–78

AZ Alkmaar

- Eredivisie: 1980–81
- KNVB Cup: 1980–81, 1981–82
- UEFA Cup runner-up: 1980–81

Club Brugge

- Belgian Cup runner-up: 1982–83

1. FC Köln

- UEFA Cup runner-up: 1985–86
