= José Coelho (footballer, born 1961) =

Portuguese footballer

Personal information
- Full name: José da Silva Coelho
- Date of birth: 5 August 1961 (age 65)
- Place of birth: Penafiel, Portugal
- Height: 1.74 m (5 ft 9 in)
- Position: Striker

Youth career
- 1978–1980: Porto

Senior career*
Years	Team	Apps	(Gls)
1980–1981	Porto	5	(0)
1981–1988	Boavista	157	(33)
1988–1989	Estrela Amadora	24	(1)
1989–1990	Penafiel	32	(10)
1990–1991	Chaves	34	(10)
1991–1992	Boavista	15	(0)
1992–1993	Penafiel	32	(8)
1993–1995	Felgueiras	50	(25)
1995–1996	Lixa	20	(5)
1996–1997	Sanjoanense	18	(4)
Total		407	(96)

International career
1981–1982	Portugal U21	11	(3)
1986–1987	Portugal	8	(2)
- * Club domestic league appearances and goals

José da Siva Coelho (born 5 August 1961) is a Portuguese retired footballer who played as a striker.

== Club career ==
Born in Penafiel, Coelho made his professional – and Primeira Liga – debut in 1980–81 with FC Porto. Barred by the likes of English Mickey Walsh he hardly ever got ever a game, and moved after one sole season to Boavista FC, also in Porto.

During seven top flight campaigns, Coelho contributed to the Checquereds' domestic and European consolidation, being regularly used either as a starter or from the bench and helping the team to three UEFA Cup participations. In 1988, he signed for another club in the top division, C.F. Estrela da Amadora, spending the following two years with as many teams still in that tier, and reaching double digits for both F.C. Penafiel and G.D. Chaves.

After an unassuming 1991–92 with former side Boavista, which nonetheless brought him the only major honour of his career, the Portuguese Cup, 31-year-old Coelho moved to the second level and joined another former club, Penafiel, after which he signed for F.C. Felgueiras, scoring 11 goals in 21 matches in his second year en route to top flight promotion. He closed out his career in 1997, after one year apiece with lowly F.C. Lixa and A.D. Sanjoanense.

== International career ==
After the defection of practically all of the Portugal team following the infamous Saltillo Affair at the 1986 FIFA World Cup, Coelho benefitted from the situation and went on to earn eight caps in the following two years. He appeared for the nation during the unsuccessful UEFA Euro 1988 qualifying campaign, scoring in one of his first games, a 1–1 home draw against Sweden.

José Coelho: International goals
No.	Date	Venue	Opponent	Score	Result	Competition
1	12 October 1986	Estádio Nacional, Lisbon, Portugal	Sweden	1–1	1–1	Euro 1988 qualifying
2	7 January 1987	Estádio Municipal de Portalegre, Portalegre, Portugal	Greece	1–0	1–1	Friendly

== Awards ==
With FC Porto:

- Vice-champion of Portugal in 1981

With Boavista:

- Winner of the Portuguese Cup in 1992
