= Benoît Thans =

Belgian footballer

Personal information
- Date of birth: 20 August 1964 (age 62)
- Place of birth: Liège, Belgium
- Position: Midfielder

Youth career
- 19..–1978: FC Blégny
- 1978–1982: R.F.C. de Liège

Senior career*
| Years | Team | Apps | (Gls) |
| 1982–1987 | R.F.C. de Liège | | |
| 1987–1988 | RC Lens | 21 | (3) |
| 1988–1991 | Standard de Liège | 83 | (13) |
| 1991–1992 | R. Antwerp F.C. | 2 | (0) |
| 1992–1993 | Standard de Liège | 1 | (0) |
| 1993–1995 | AC Bellinzona | | |
| 1995–1997 | R. Tilleur F.C. de Liège | | |
| 1997–2000 | K.V.C. Westerlo | 90 | (8) |
| 2000 | K.S.K. Beveren | 9 | (2) |
| 2001–2002 | R.A.A. La Louvière | 41 | (6) |

Managerial career
- 2014–: Red Bull Salzburg (scout)
- * Club domestic league appearances and goals

Benoît Thans (born 20 August 1964 in Liège, Belgium) is a retired Belgian footballer.
