= Vatroslav Petrinović =

Croatian footballer

Personal information
- Full name: Vatroslav Petrinović
- Date of birth: 13 April 1959 (age 67)
- Place of birth: SFR Yugoslavia
- Height: 1.95 m (6 ft 5 in)
- Position: Defender

Senior career*
Years	Team	Apps	(Gls)
1977–1978	Hajduk	3	(0)
1978–1979	Olimpija Ljubljana	1	(0)
1981–1985	Iskra Bugojno	118	(7)
1985–1986	Hajduk	19	(1)
1986–1988	Admira	31	(1)
1988–1989	Budućnost Titograd	12	(0)
1989–1990	Šibenik	14	(0)
- * Club domestic league appearances and goals as of 15 August 2012

Vatroslav Petrinović (born 13 April 1959 in Split) is a Croatian retired football defender, who played at the end of the 1970s and during the 1980s for Hajduk, Iskra, Admira, Budućnost Titograd, Šibenik and Olimpija. While playing for Hajduk he scored a goal in the UEFA Cup match against Metz played on 18 September 1985.
