= Reginald Badham Lodge =

English ornithologist

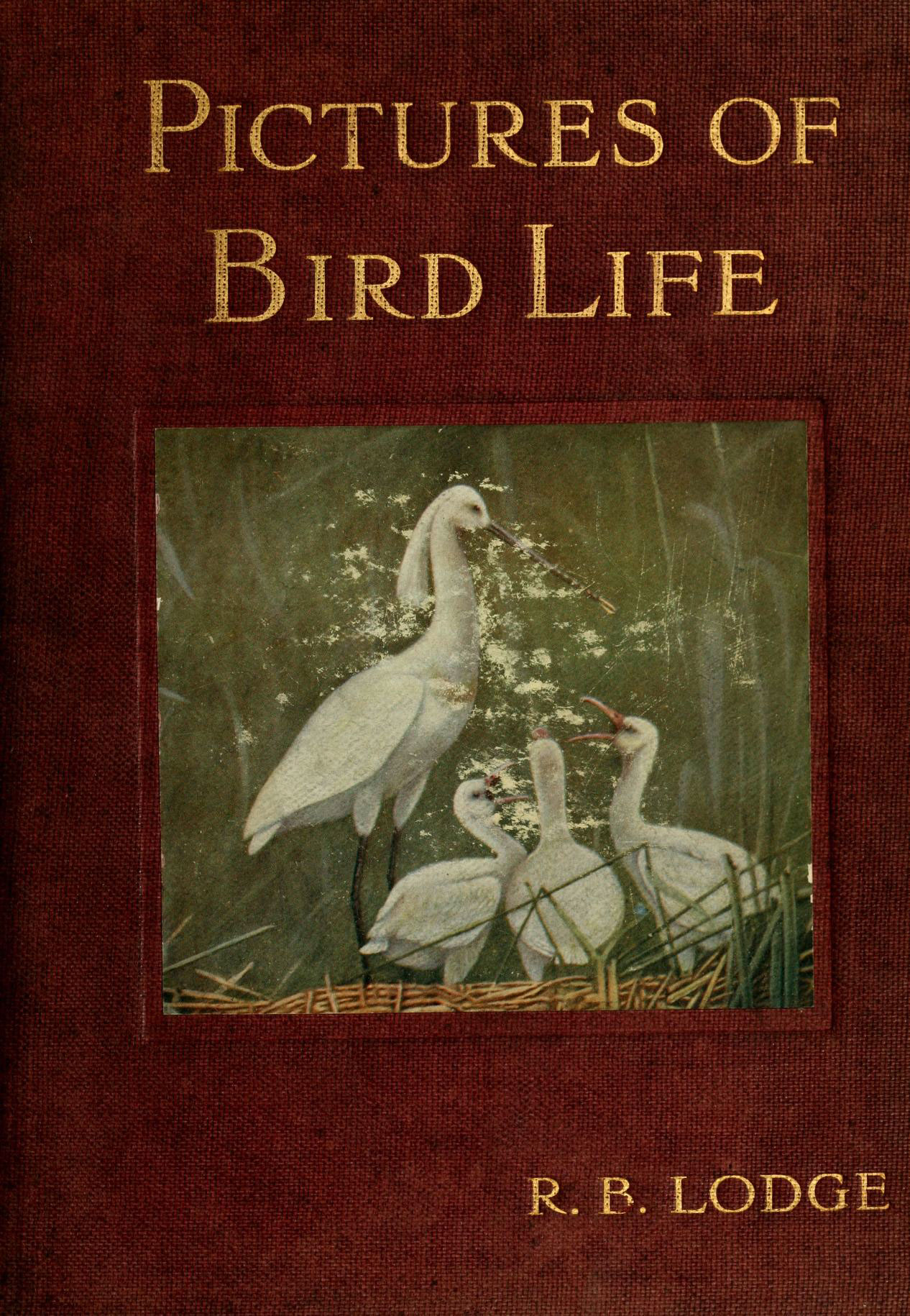
Pictures of Bird Life cover

Reginald Badham Lodge (10 March 1853–13 February 1937) was an English ornithologist, photographer, and painter of birds. In 1895 he received from the Royal Photographic Society the first medal ever presented for nature photography, for a photograph of a Northern lapwing (Vanellus vanellus) incubating its eggs. Eric Hosking and Harold Lowes stated their belief that this was the first photograph of a wild bird.

His brother was bird illustrator and falconry expert George Edward Lodge. Their father was Samuel Lodge, a canon of Lincoln Cathedral and rector of Scrivelsby, Lincolnshire.

Lodge was friends with Oliver G. Pike and they made trips together.

== Work ==
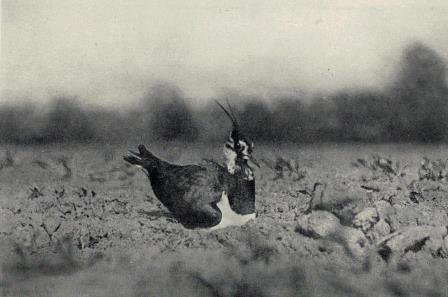
Lapwing incubating its eggs, depicting a Northern lapwing (Vanellus vanellus), for which in 1895 Lodge received from the Royal Photographic Society the first medal ever presented for nature photography. Eric Hosking and Harold Lowes stated their — incorrect — belief that this was the first photograph of a wild bird. However, Ottomar Anschütz had photographed wild white storks (Ciconia ciconia) in 1884.

In 1903 he published Pictures of Bird Life: On Woodland Meadow, Mountain and Marsh, "with numerous colour illustrations from photographs from life by the author".

His works are among the National Trust Collections at member museums:

- One hundred photographs of bird life (1907) is in the library of Coleton Fishacre, Devon
- Bird-hunting through wild Europe (1908) is in the library of Calke Abbey, Derbyshire

The Dick Institute holds several of his bird paintings.

== Gallery ==
=== Paintings ===
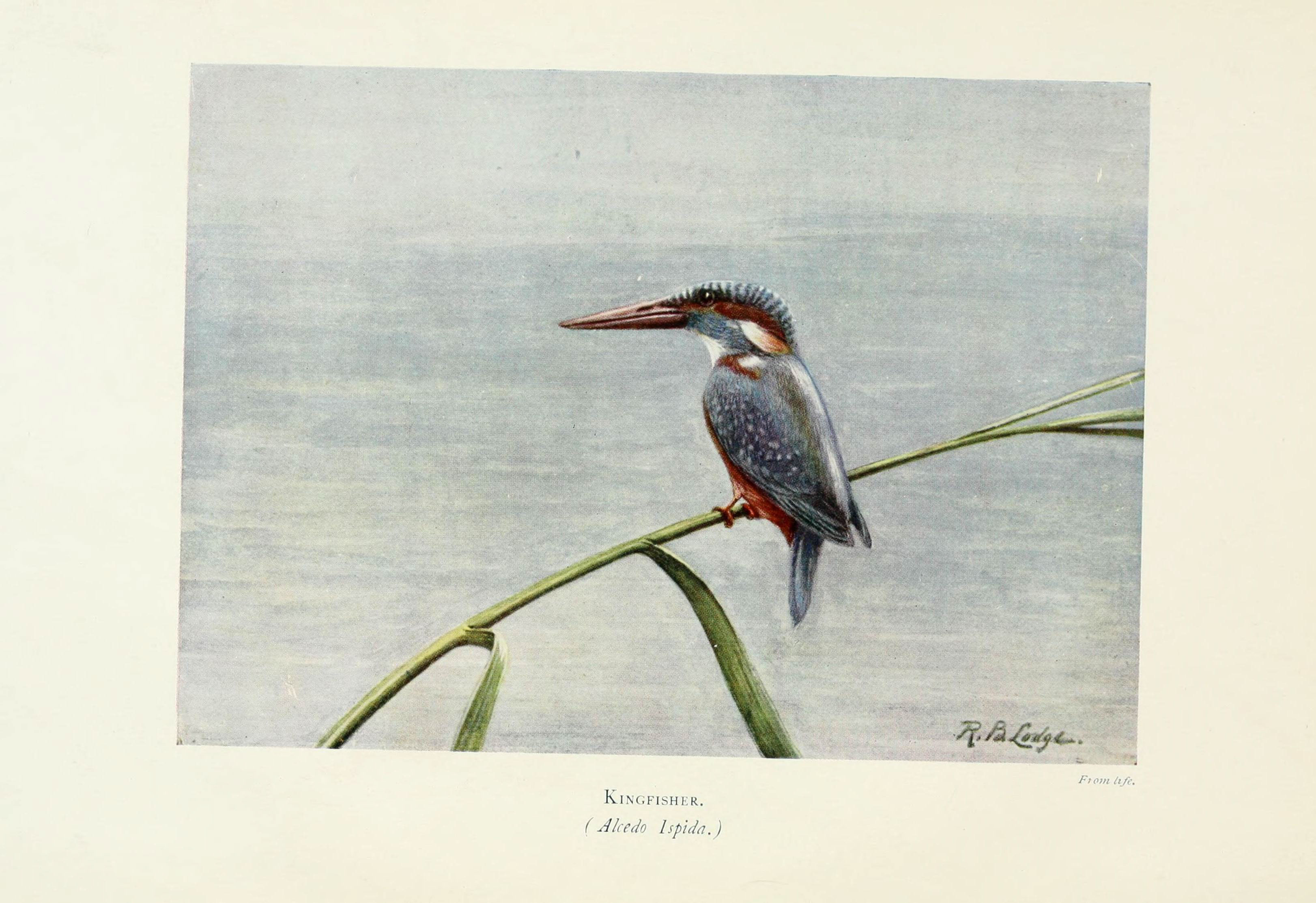
Common kingfisher

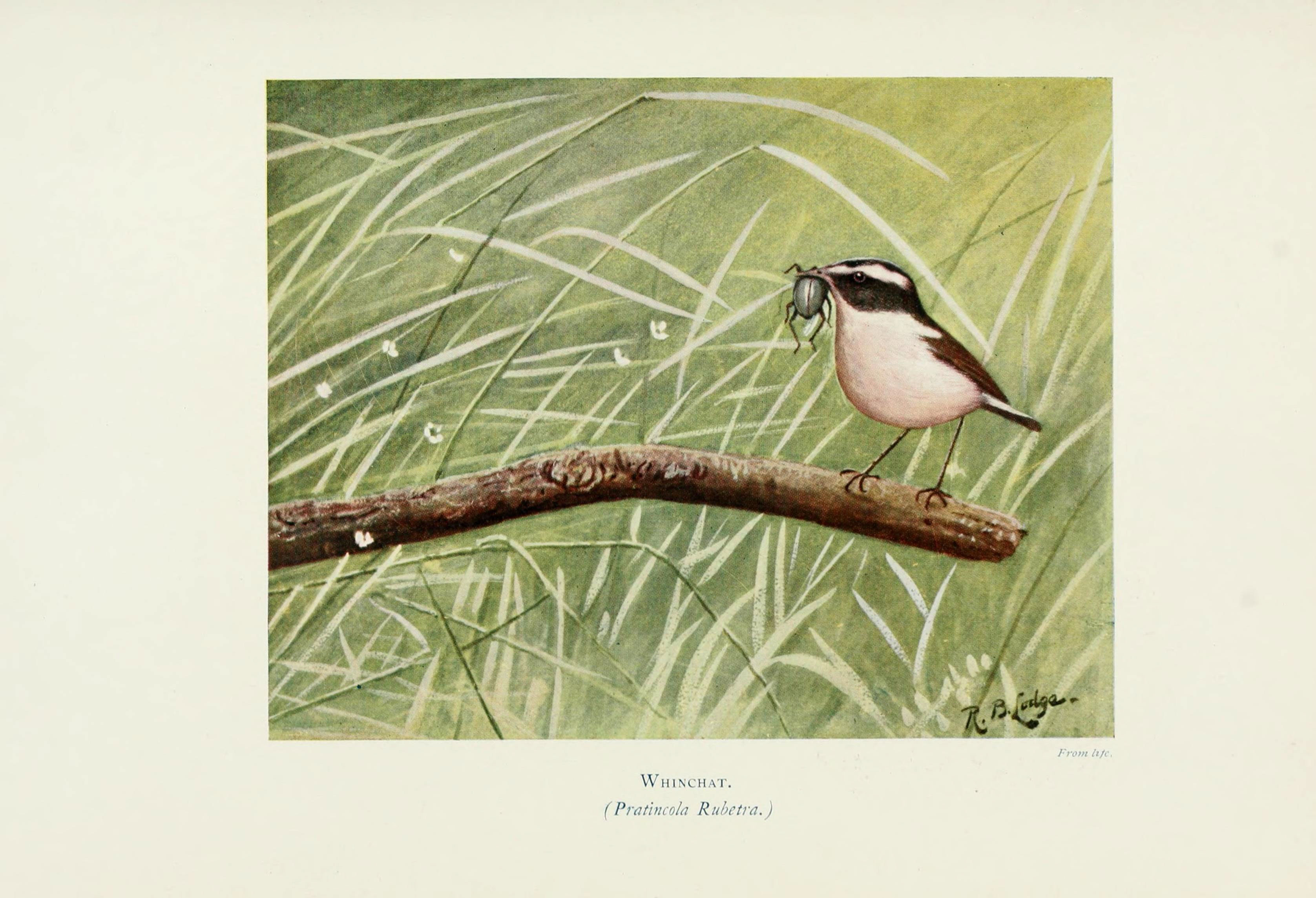
Whinchat

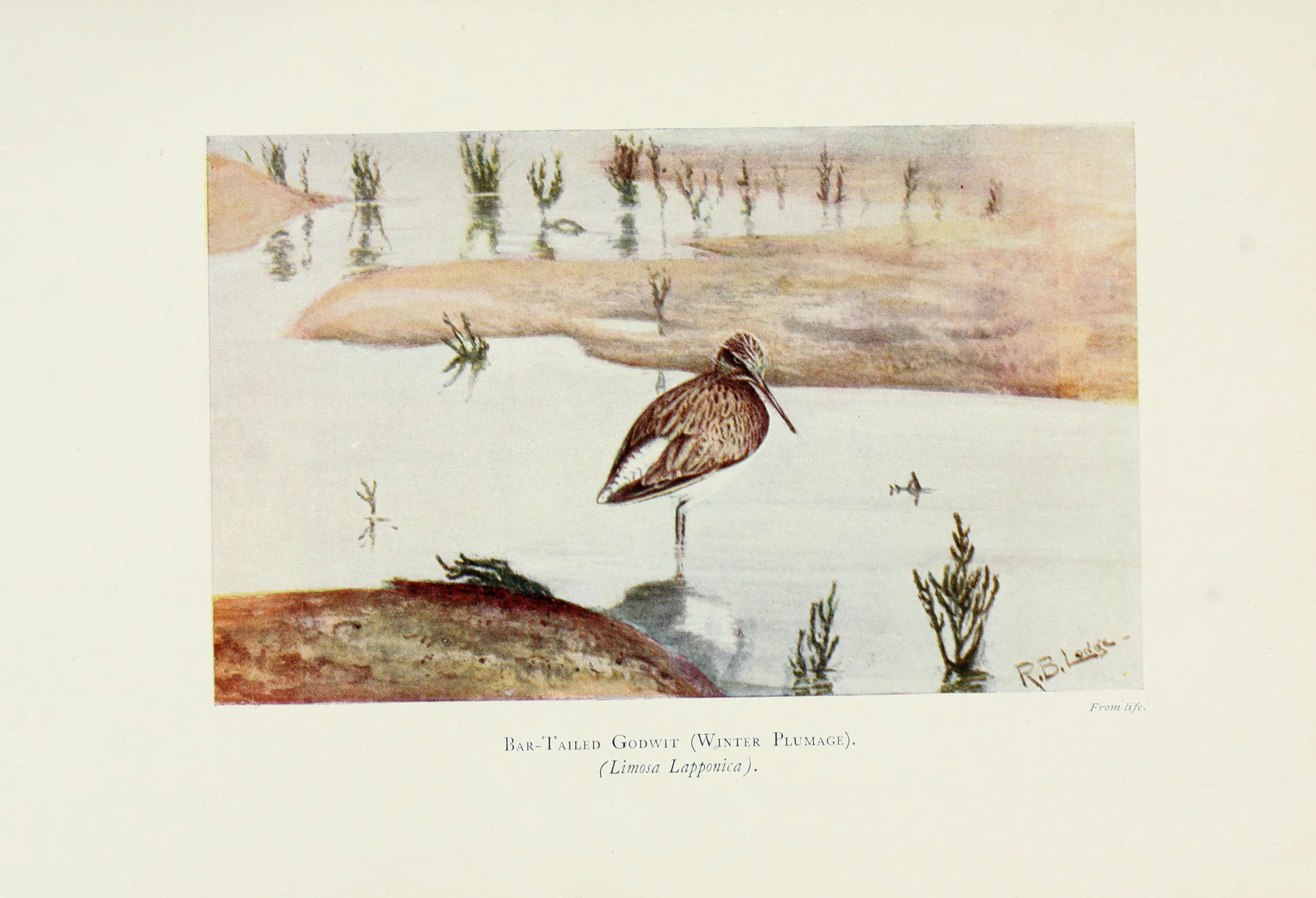

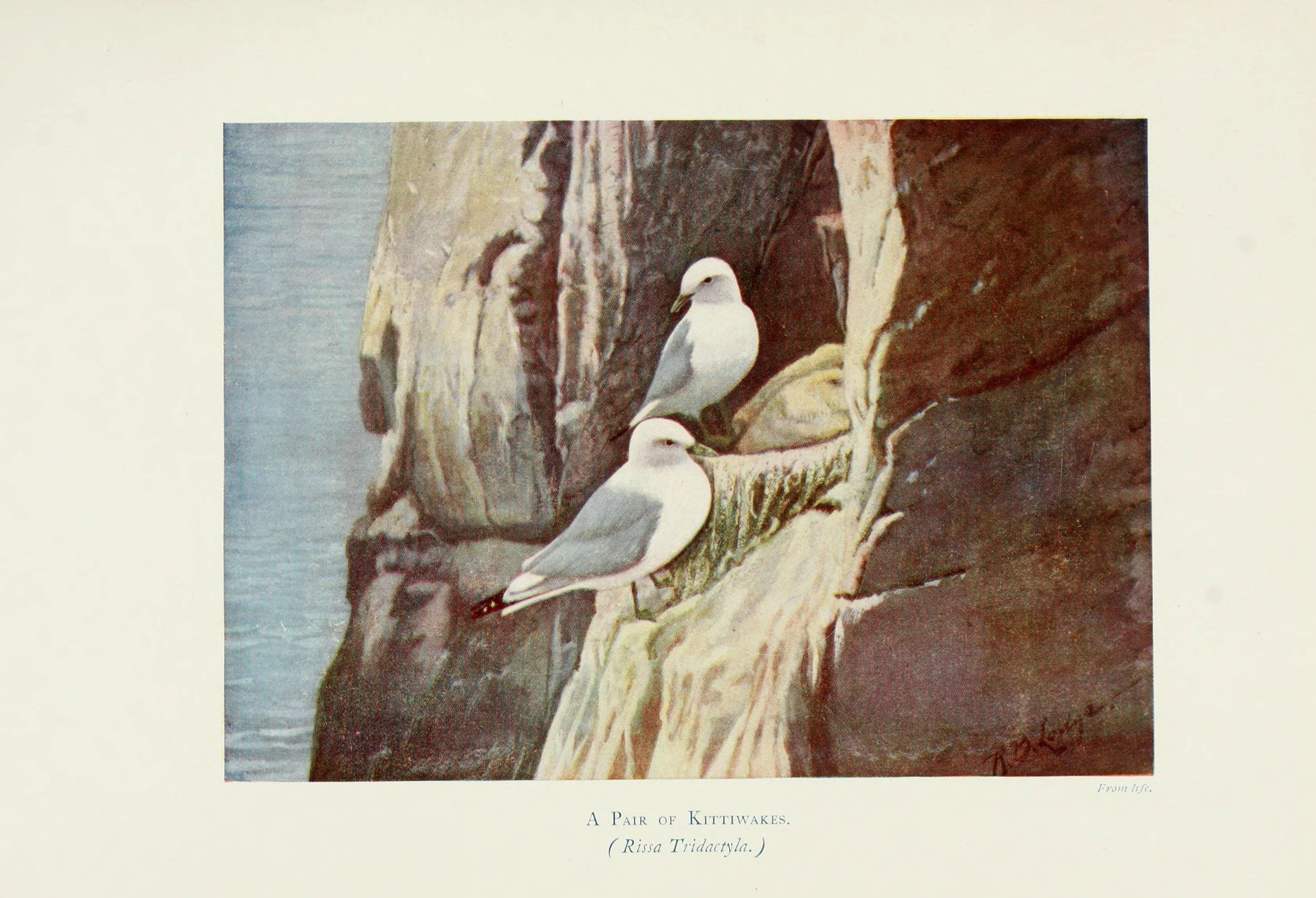

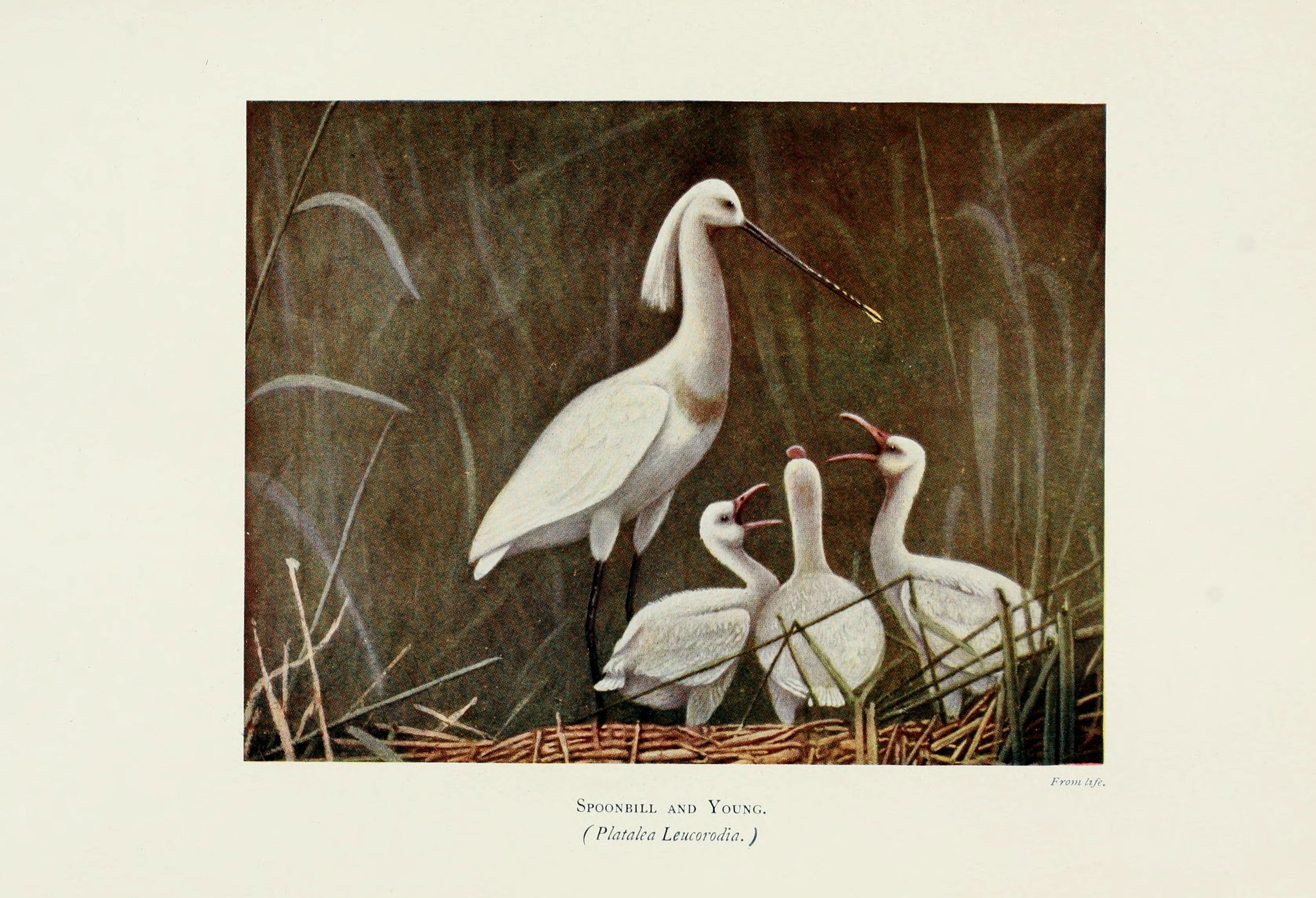
Eurasian spoonbill

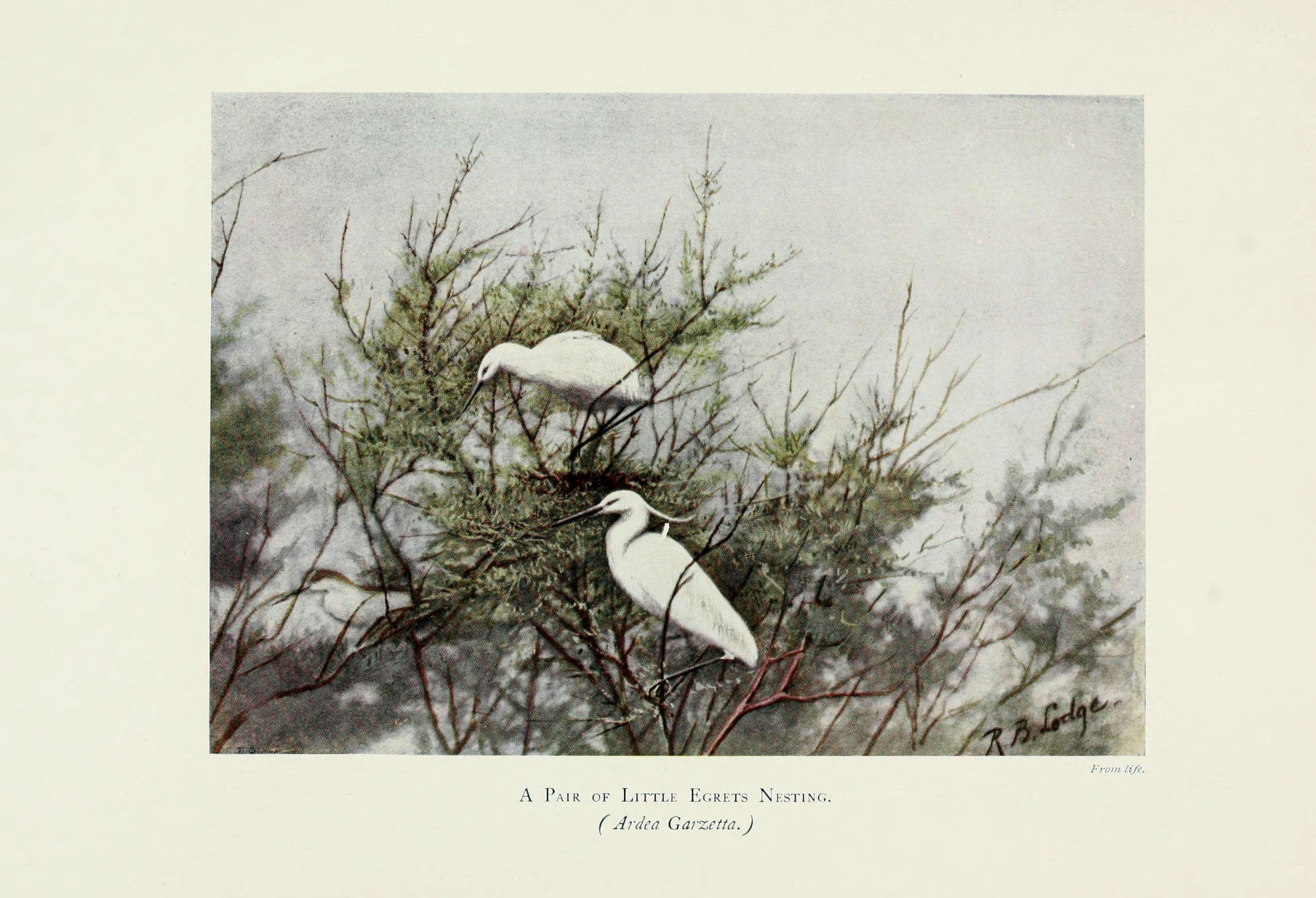

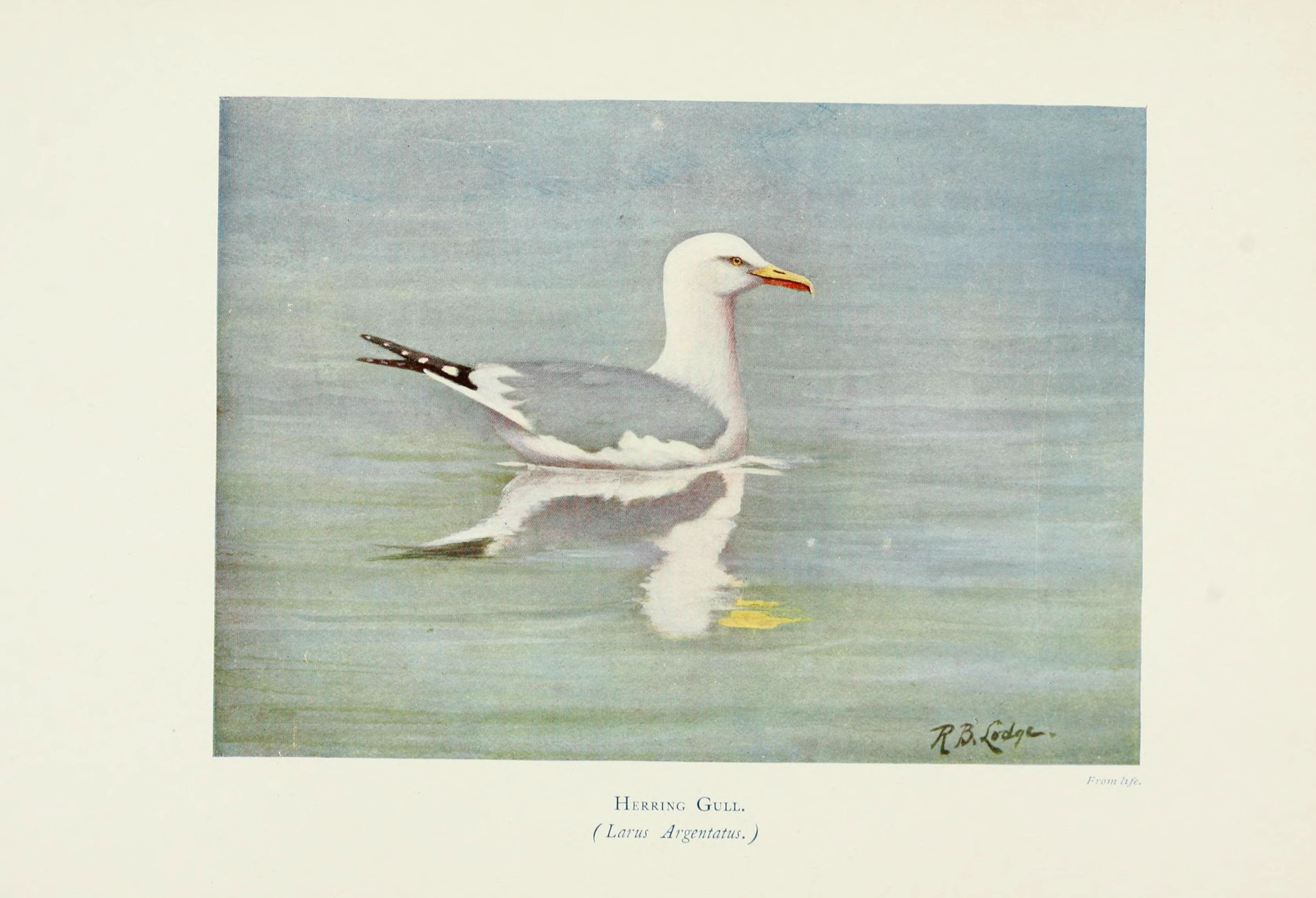

=== Photographs ===
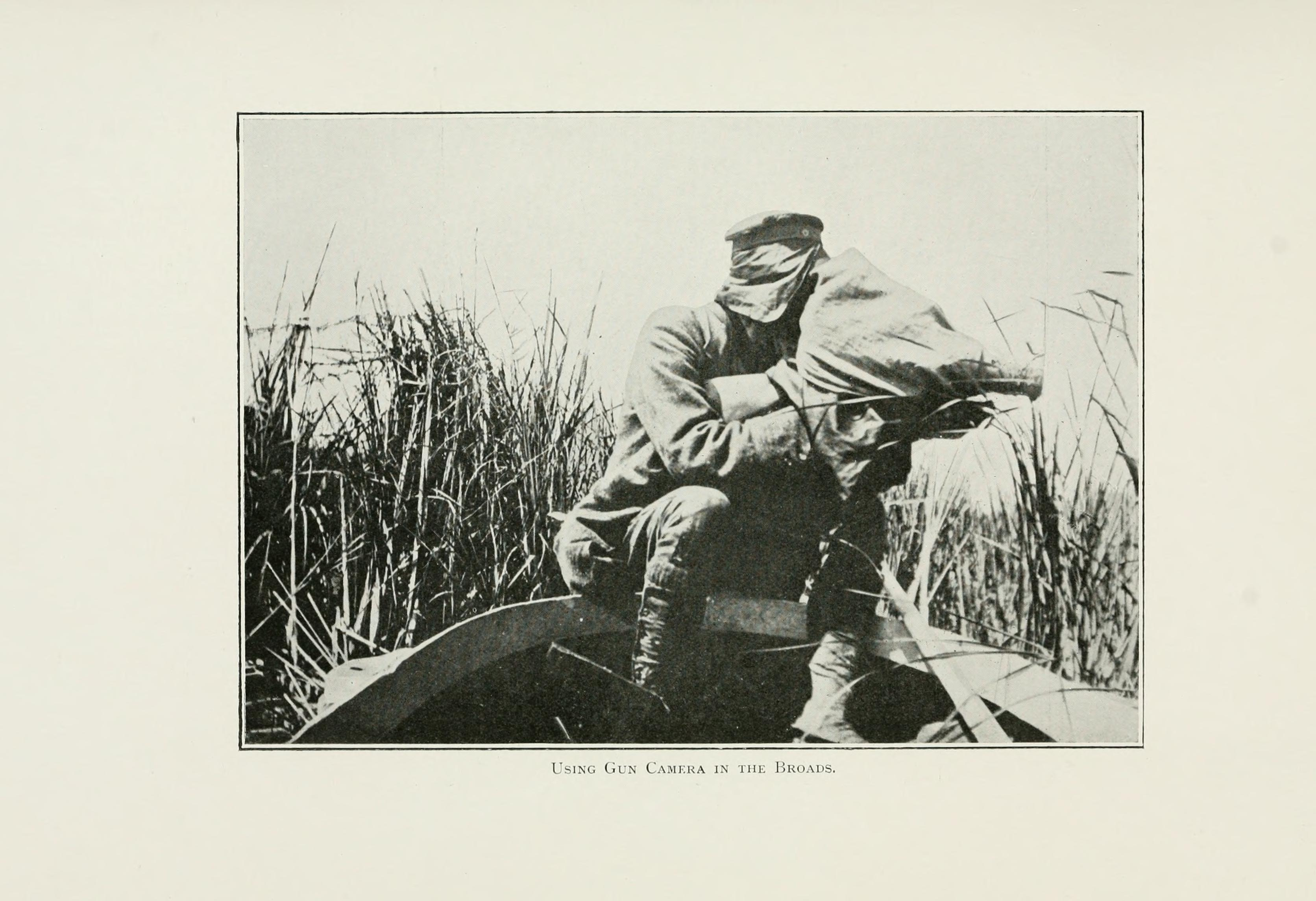

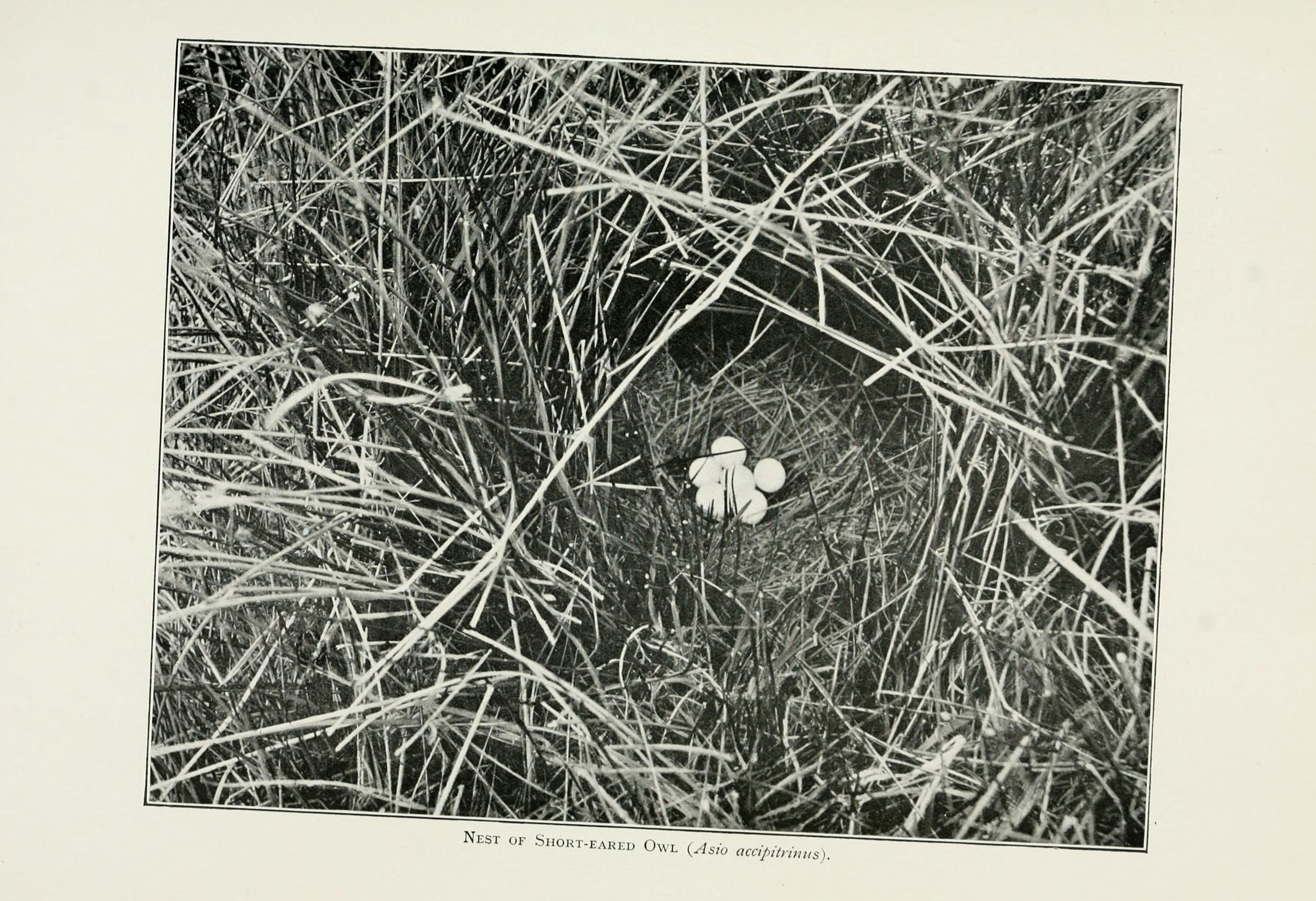

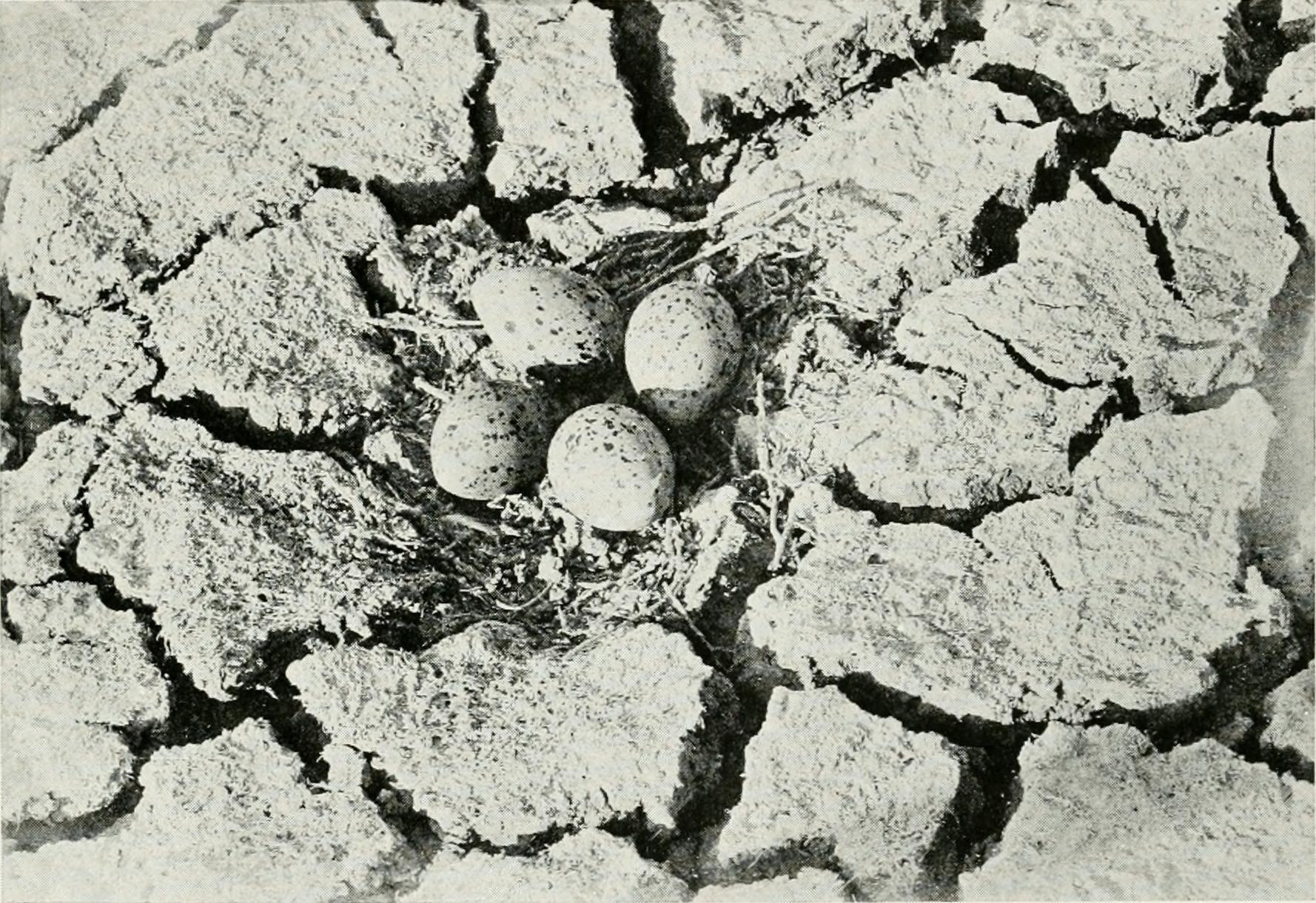

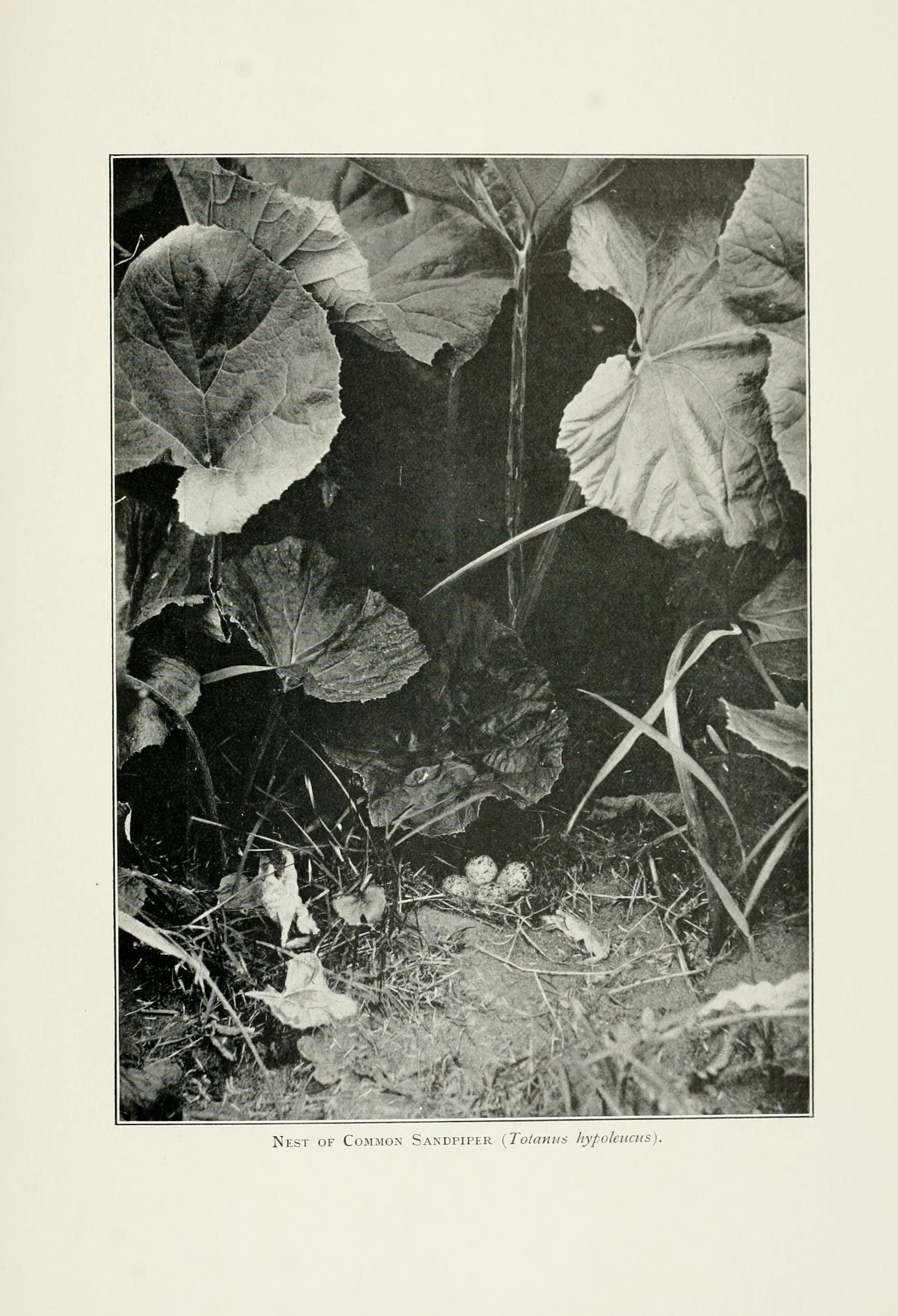

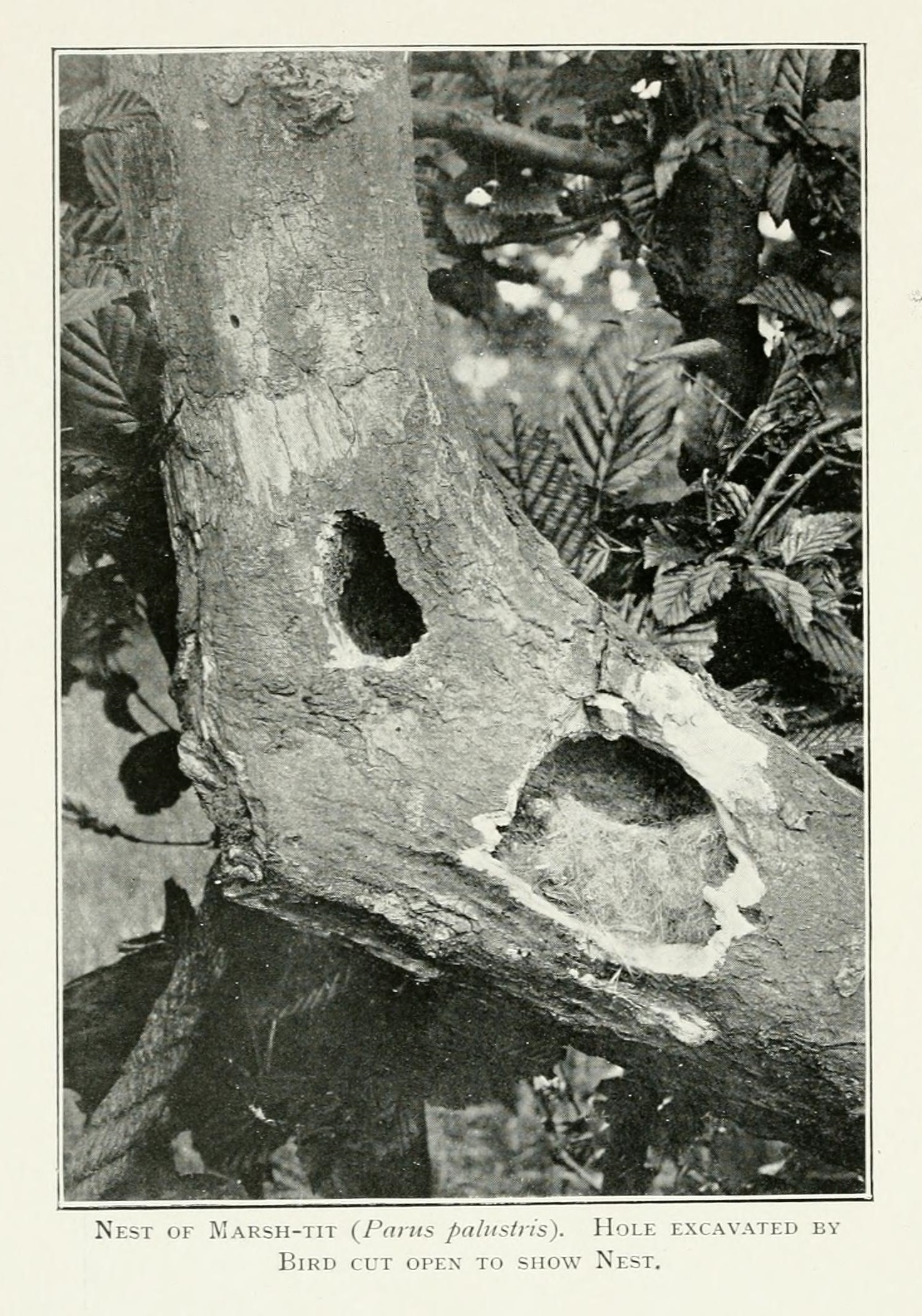

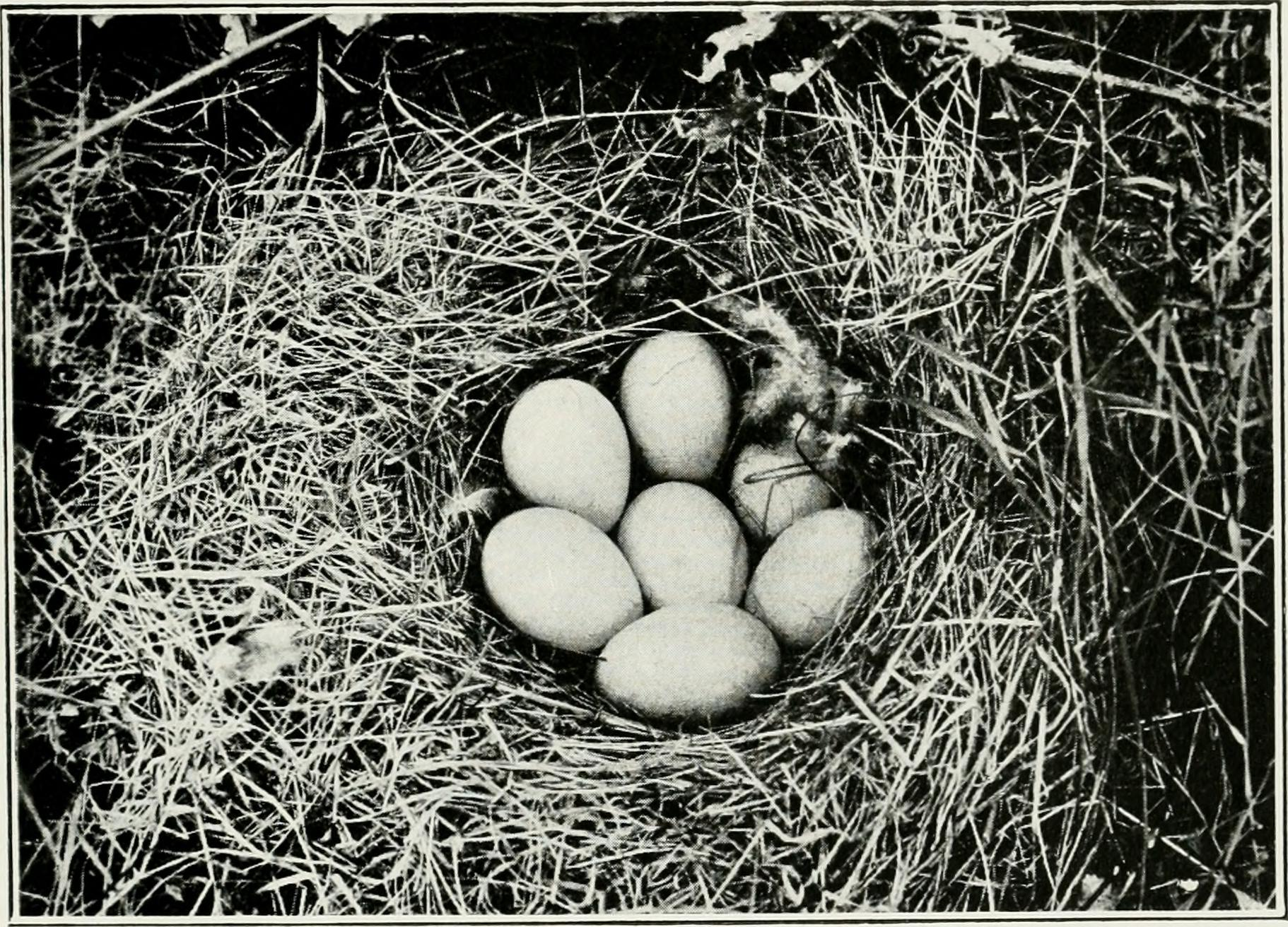

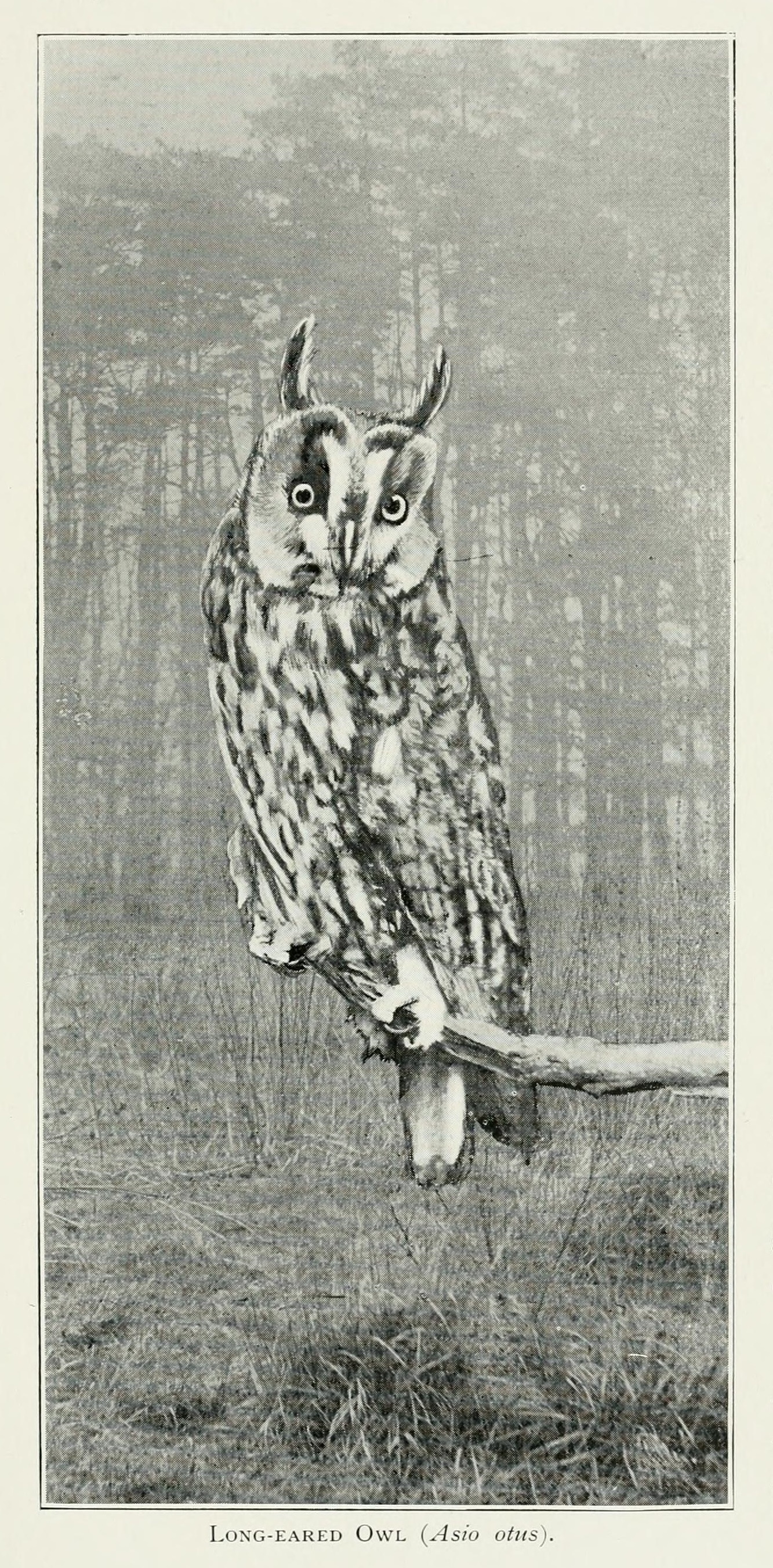

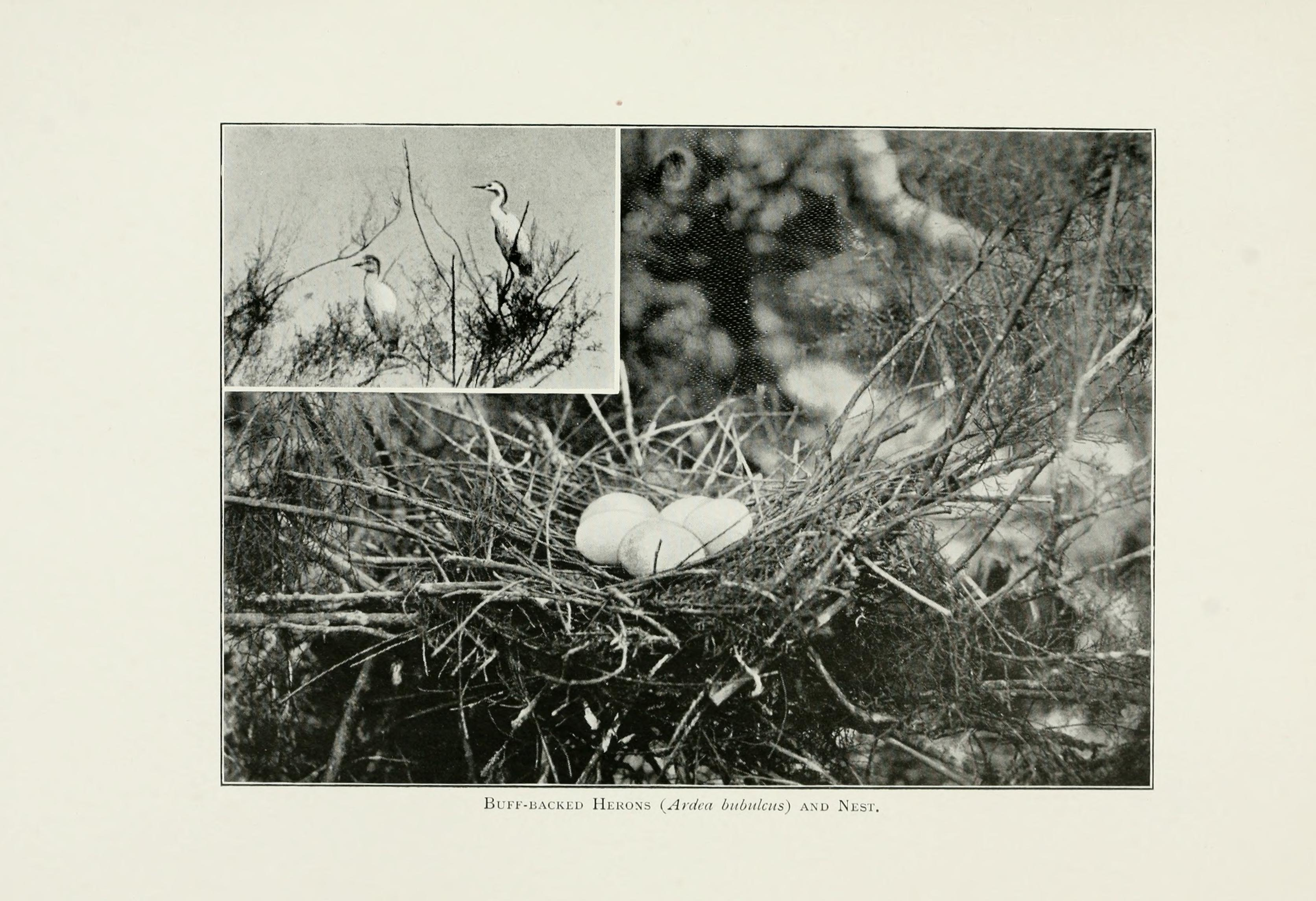

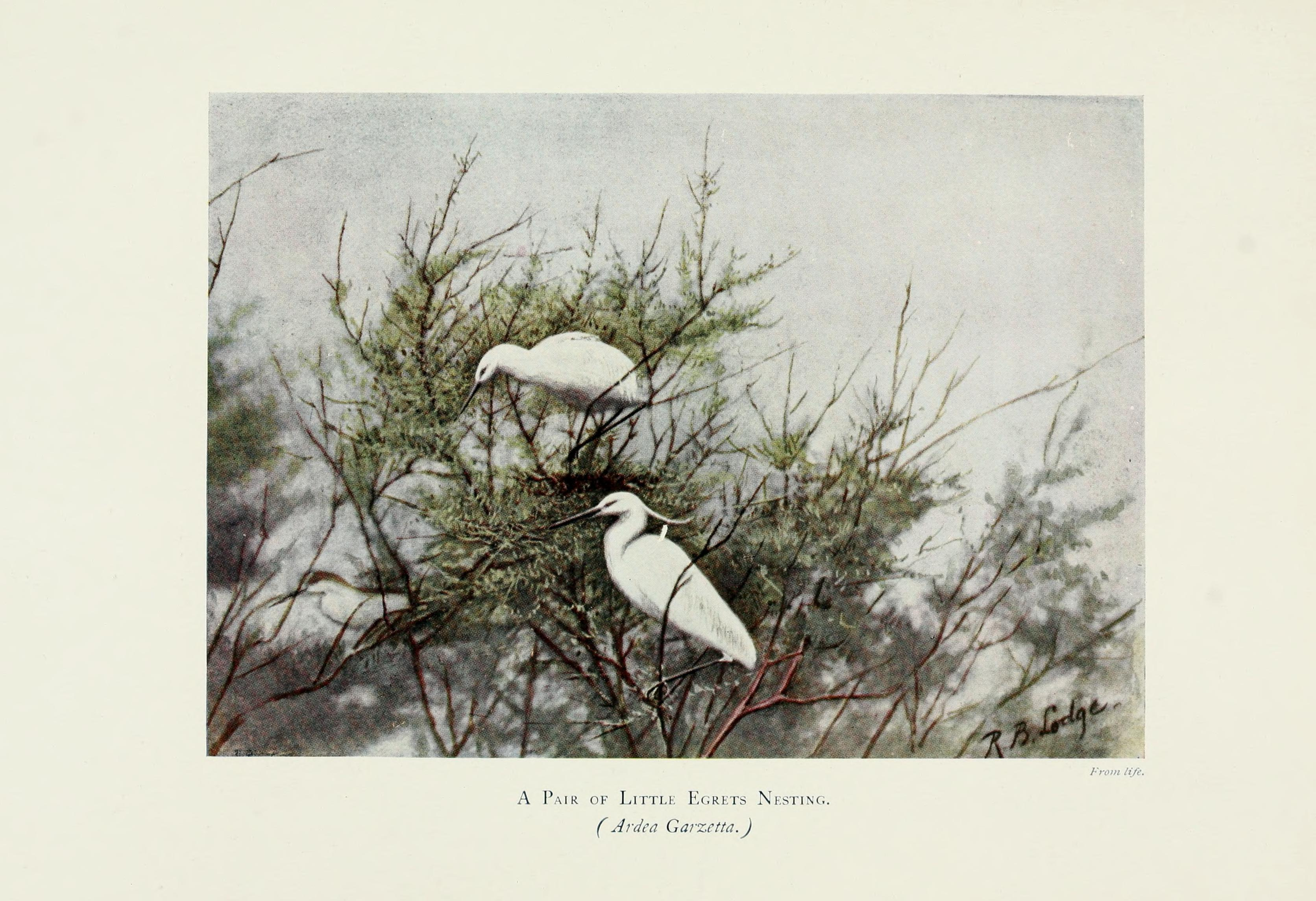

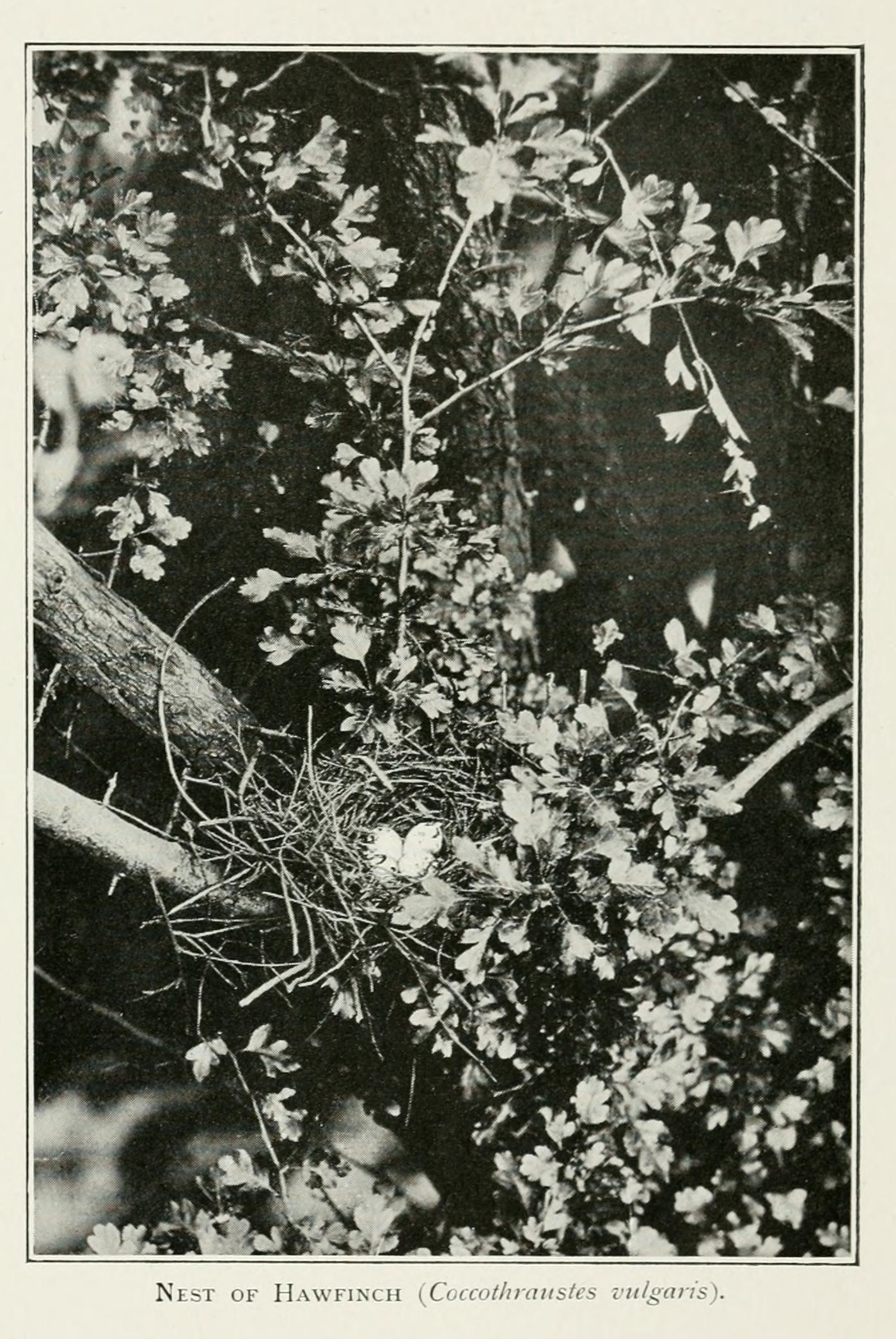

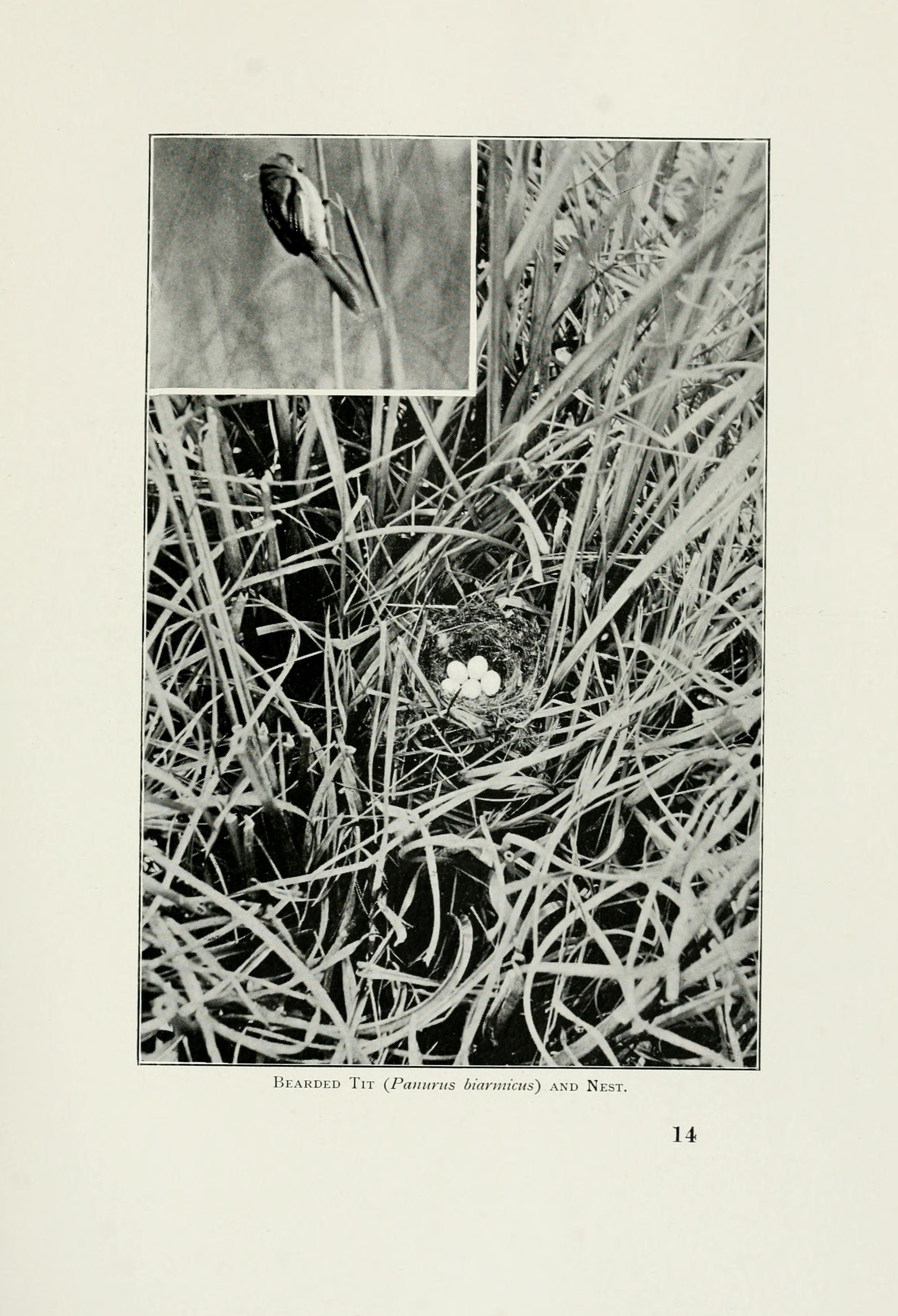

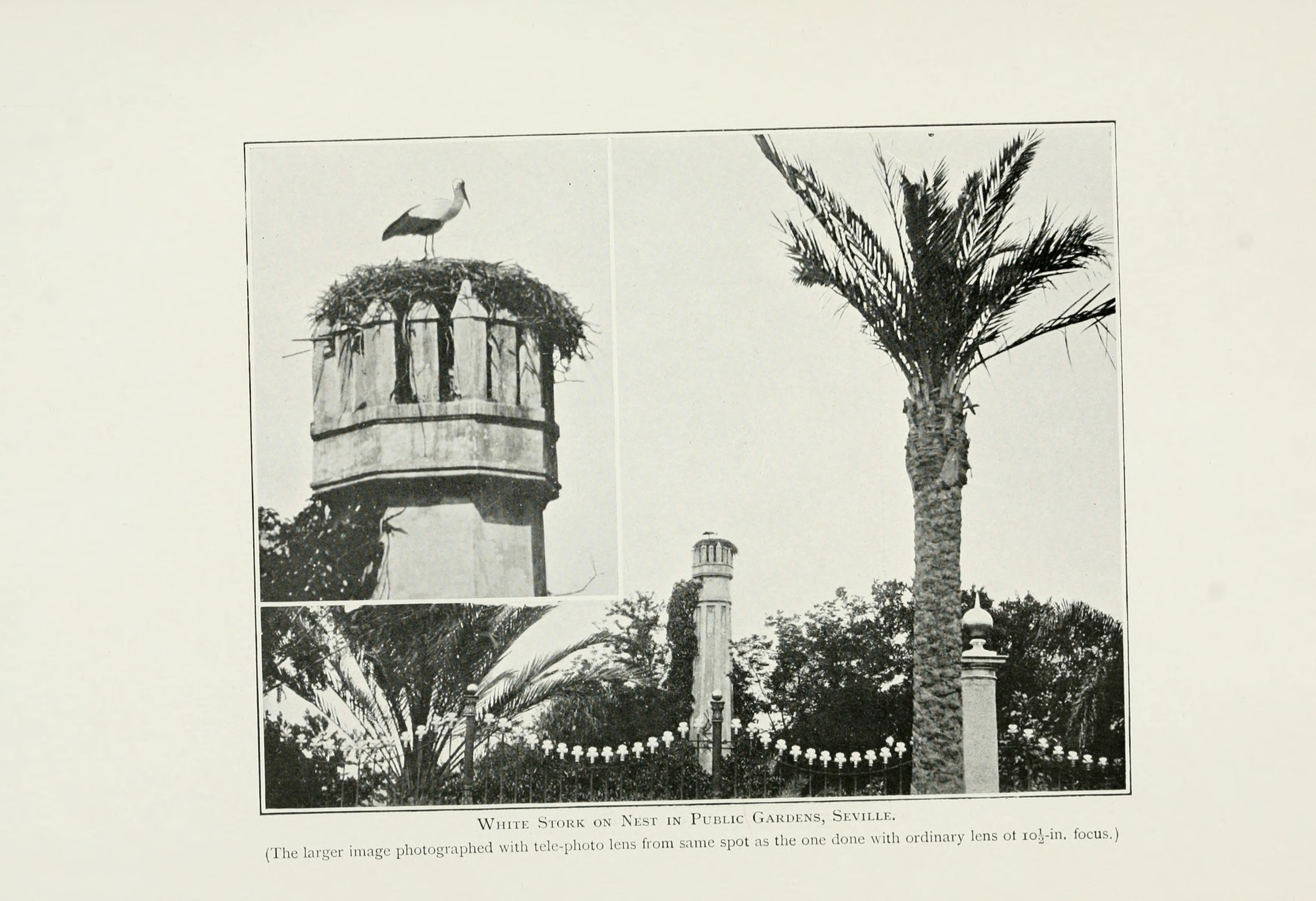

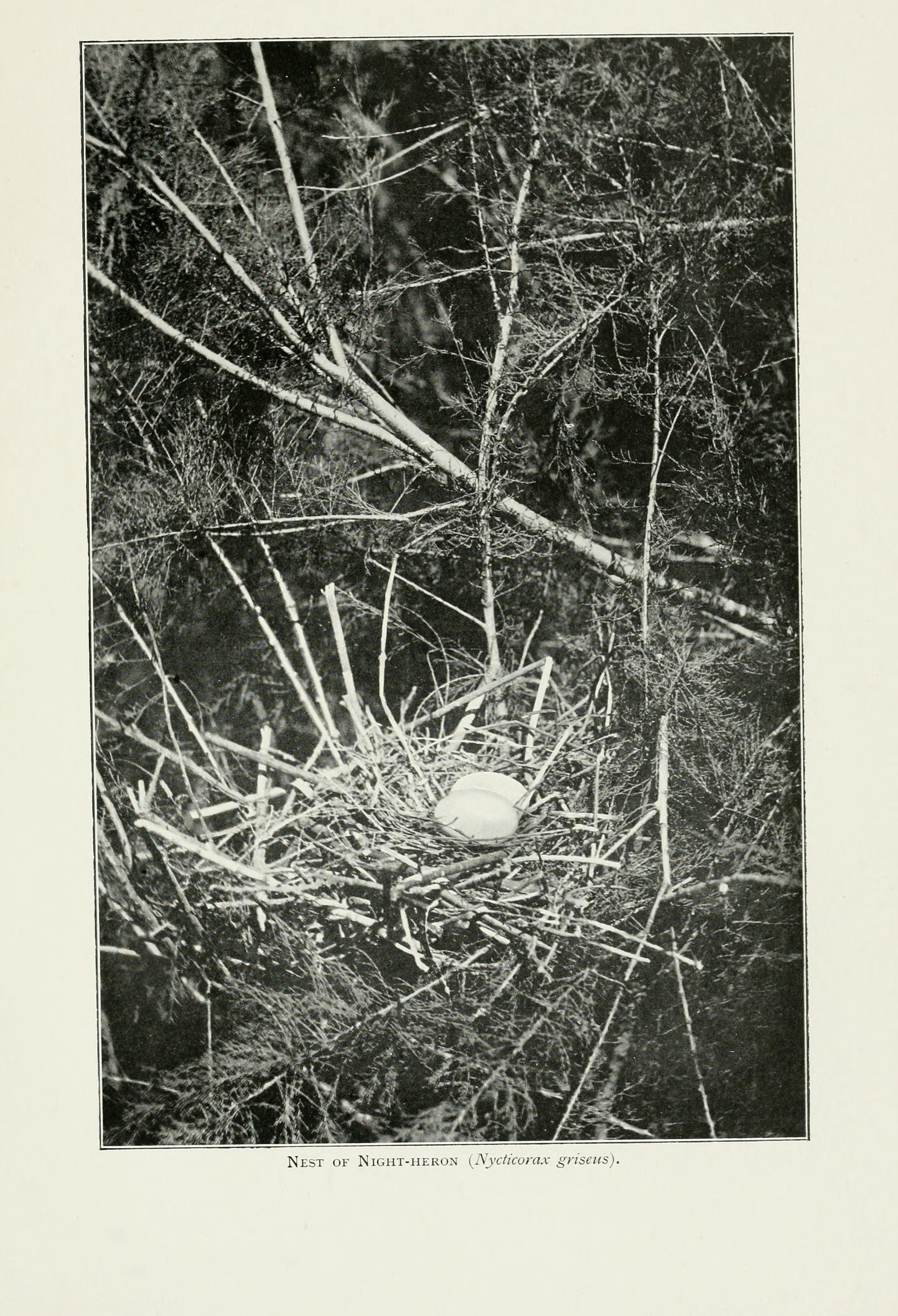

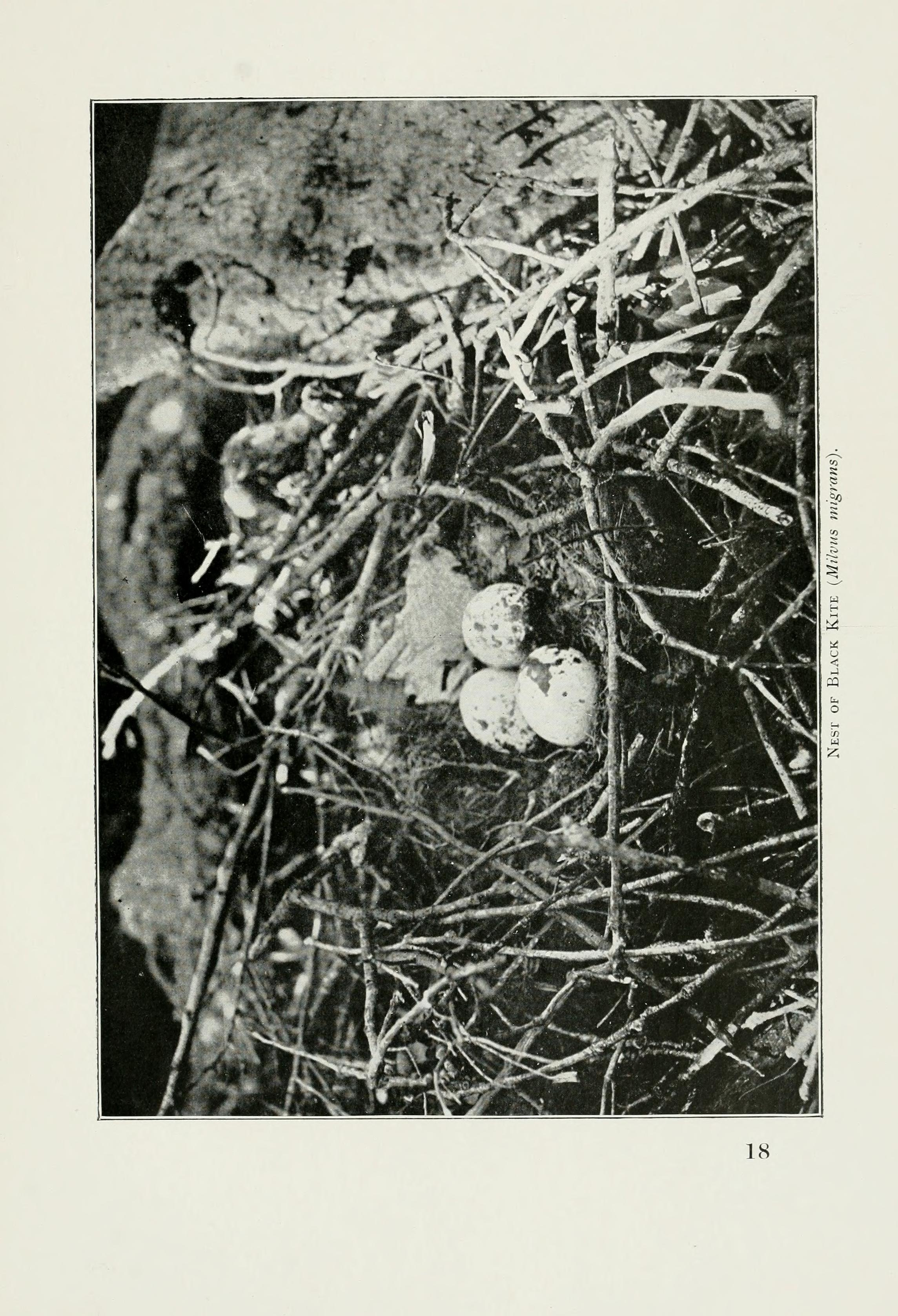

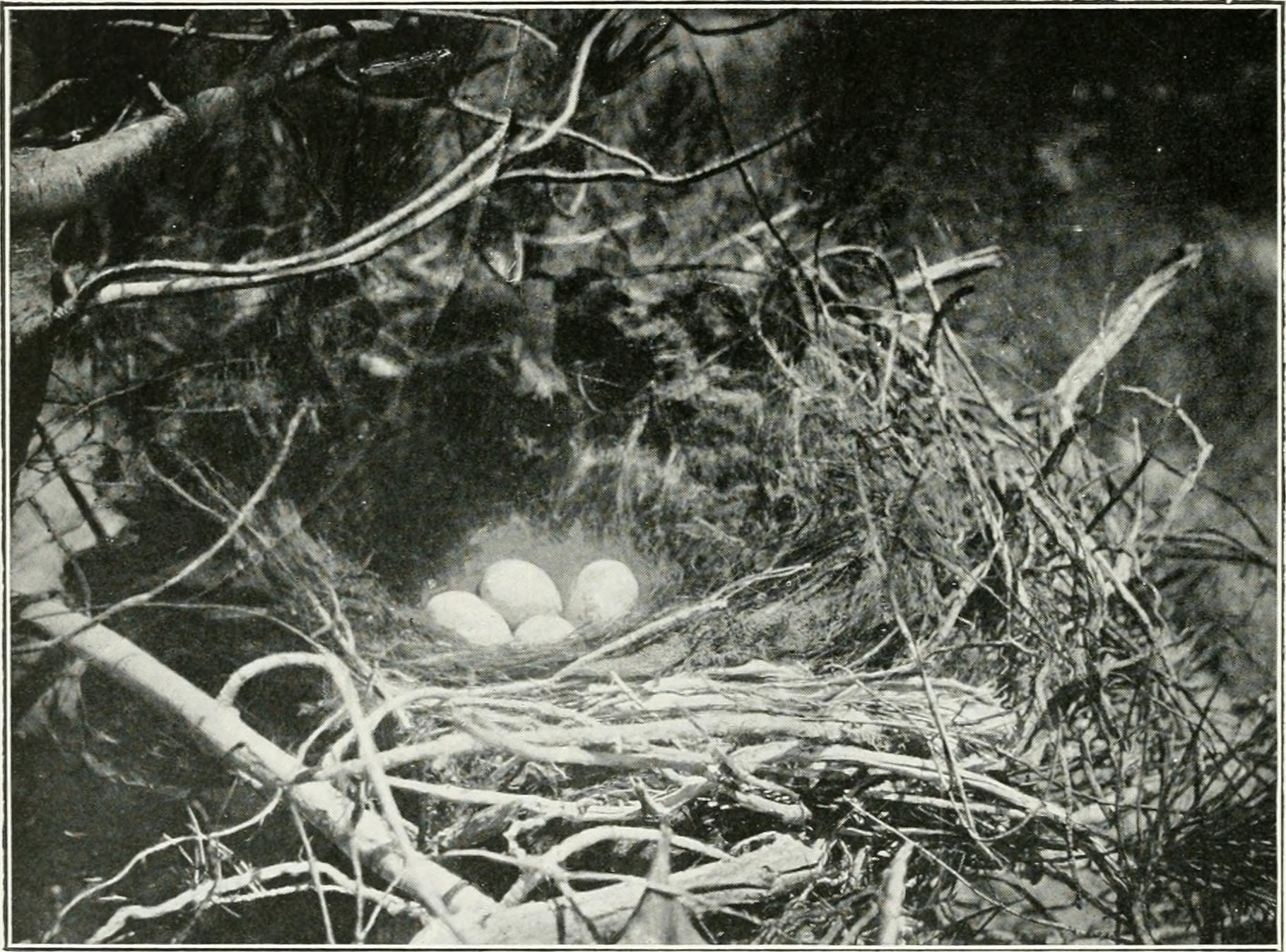

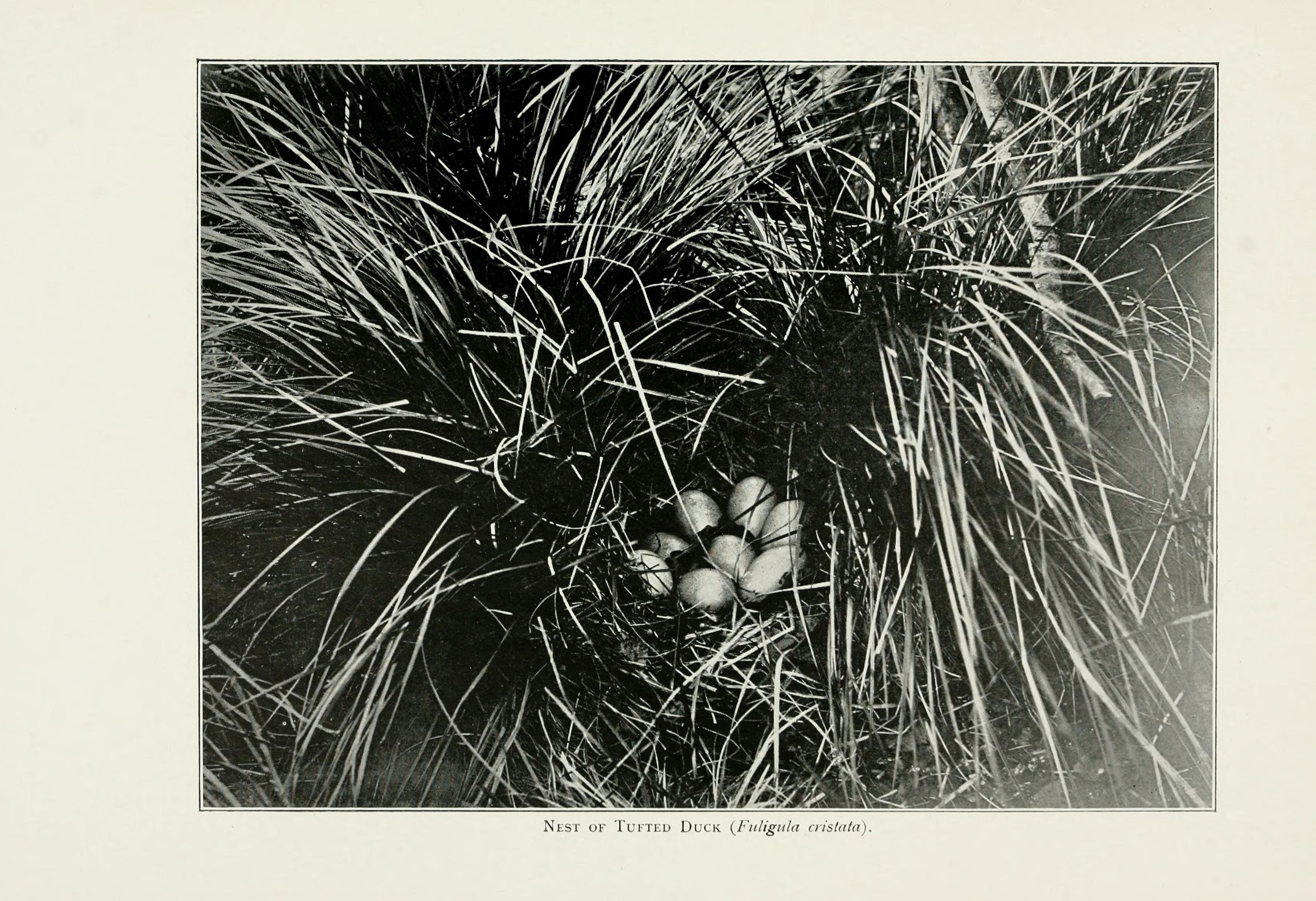

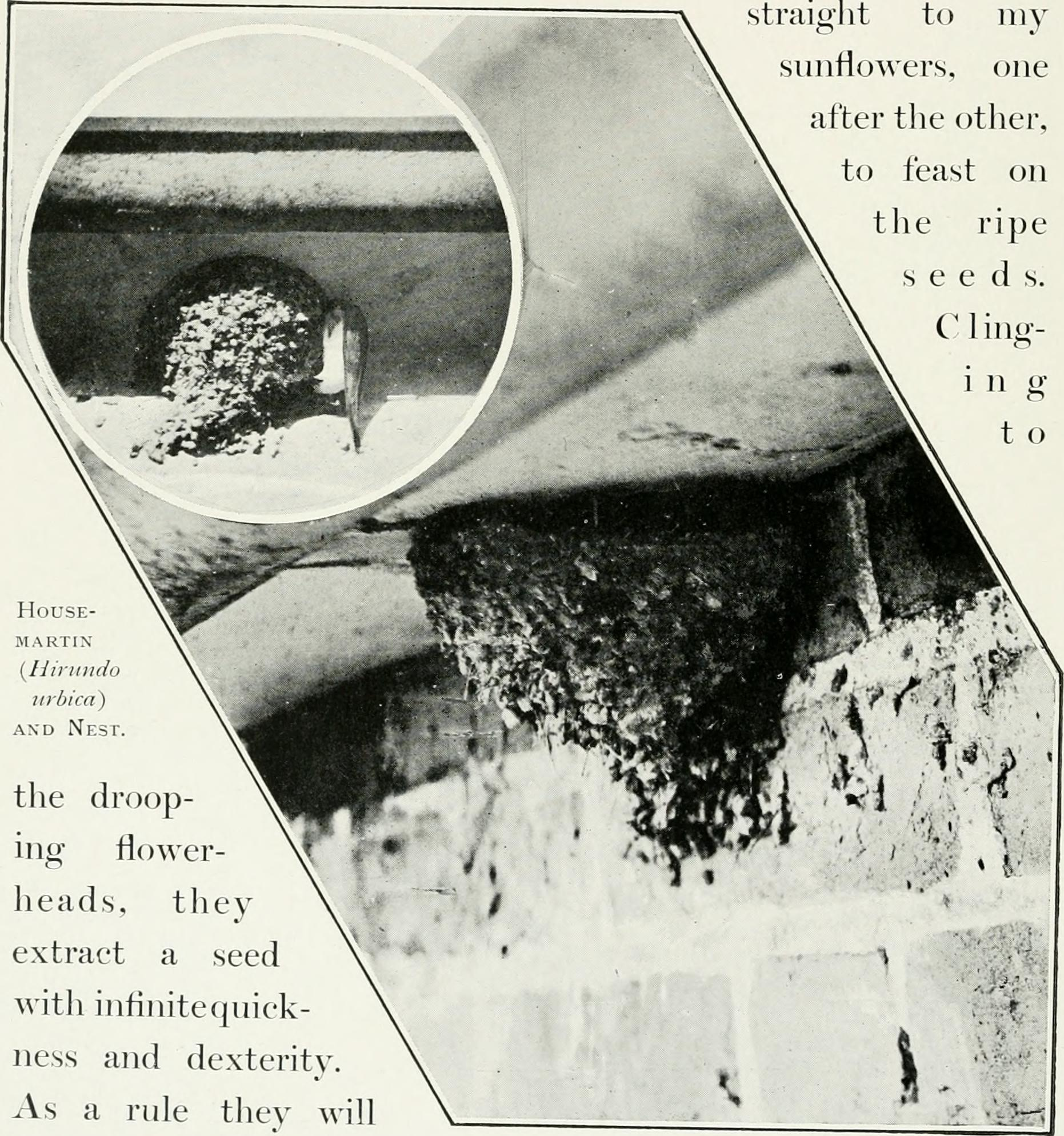

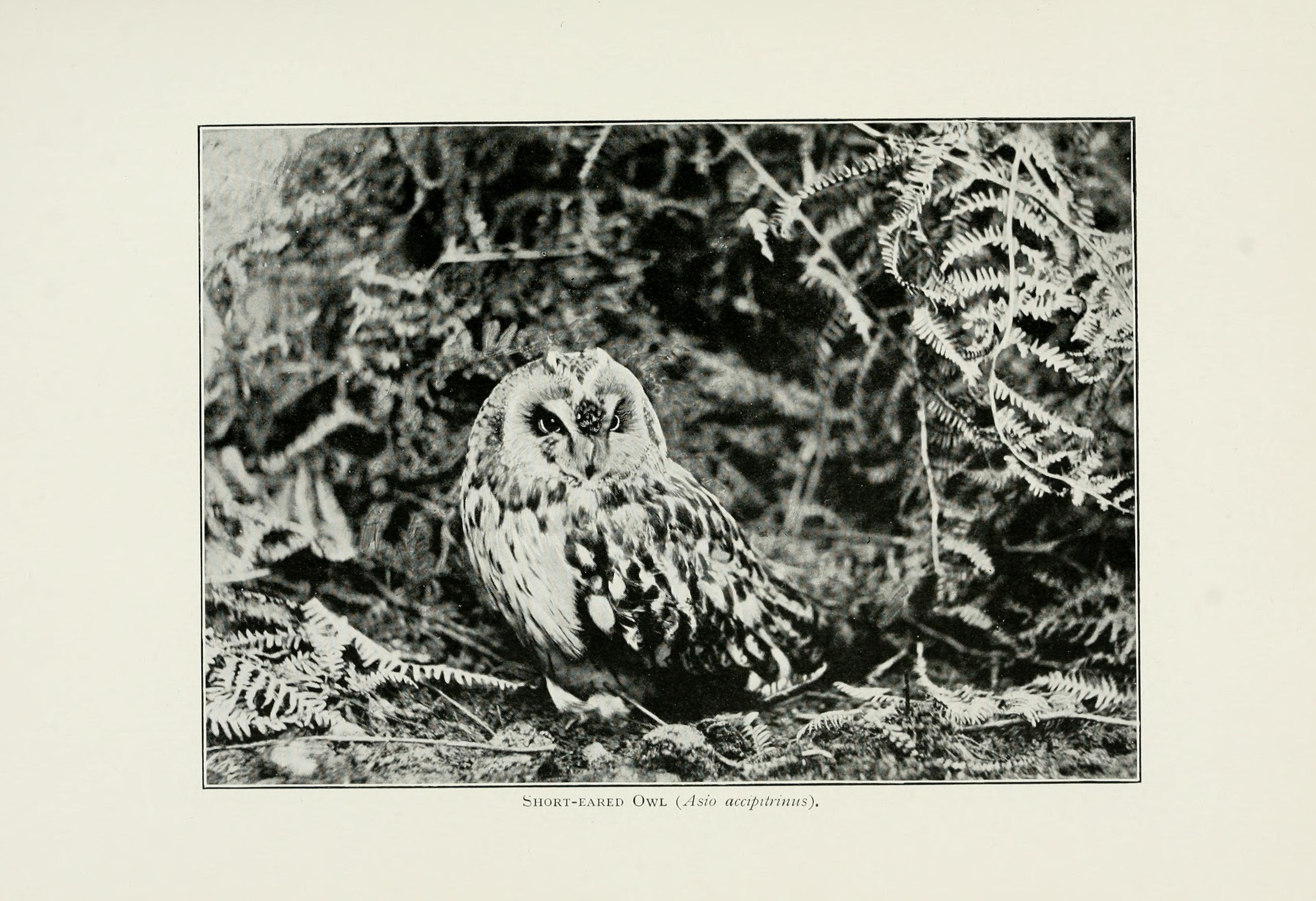

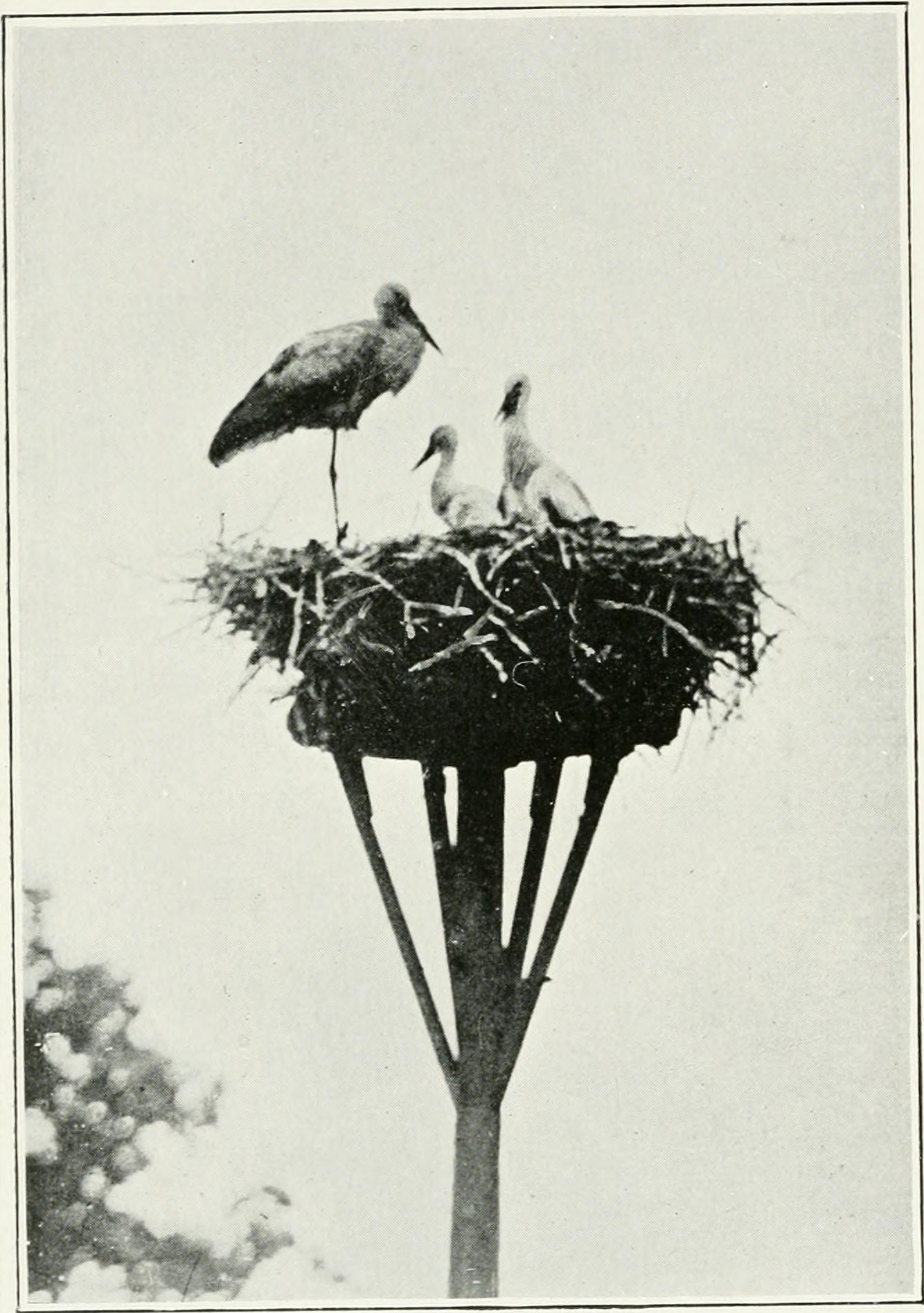

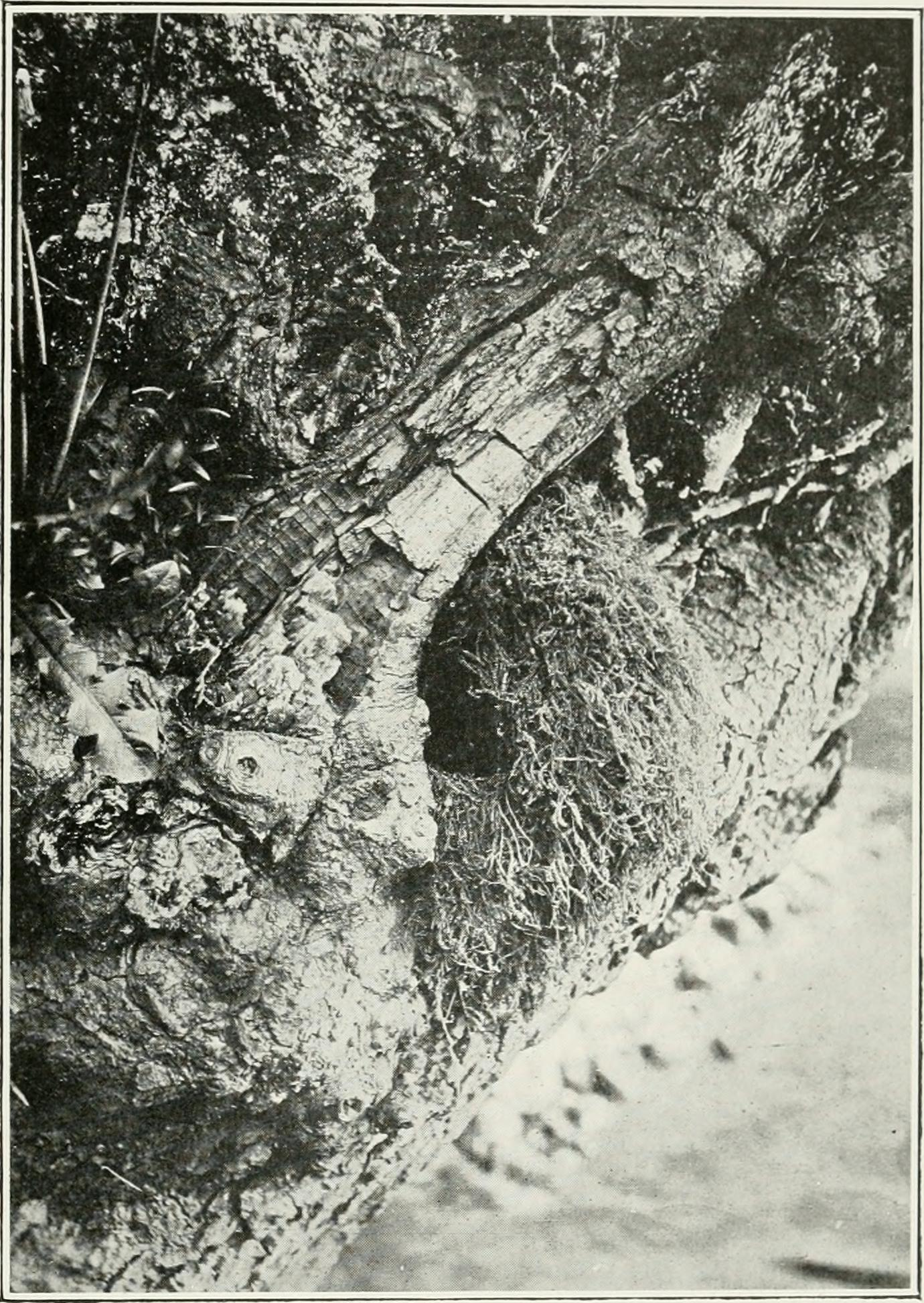

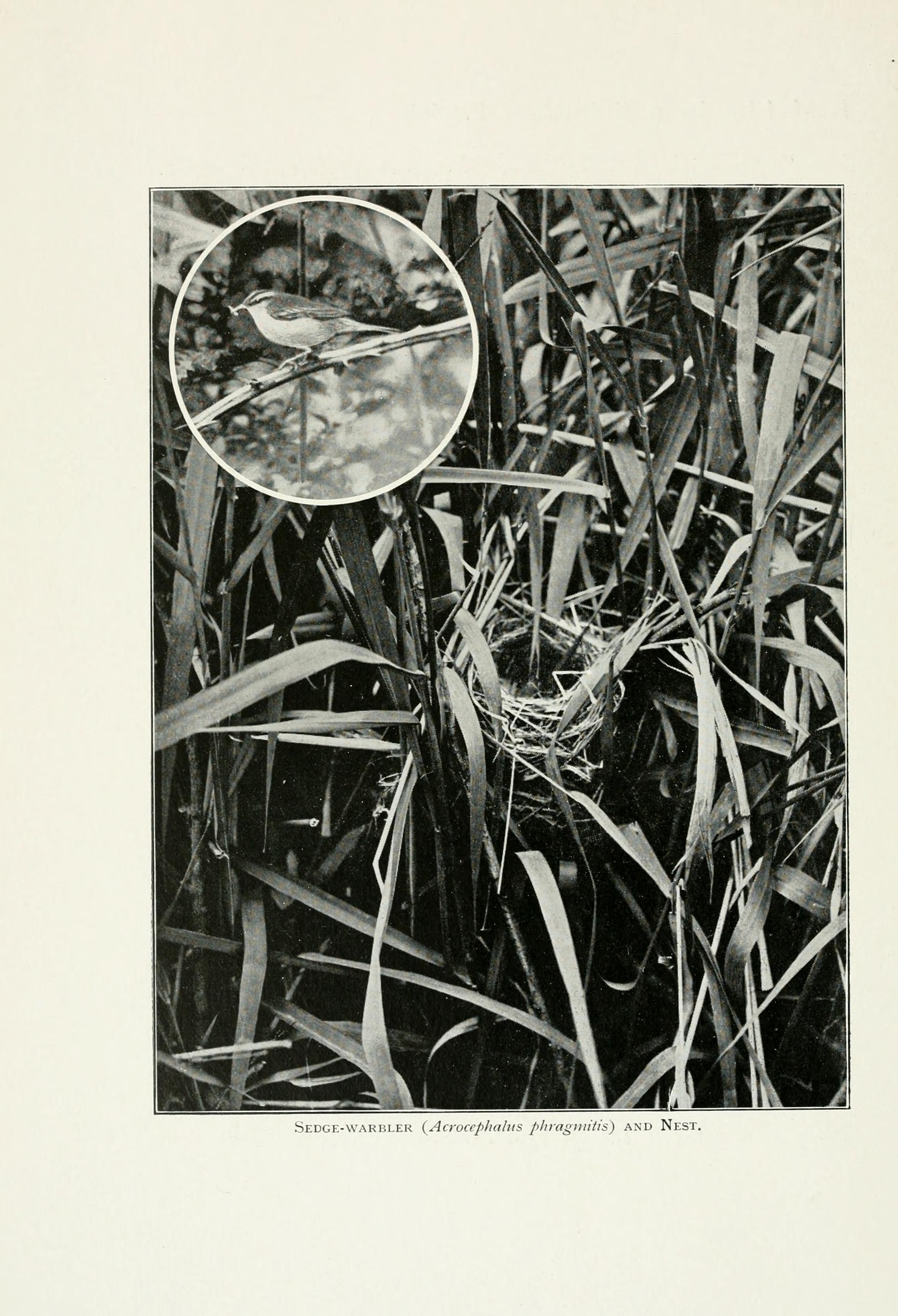

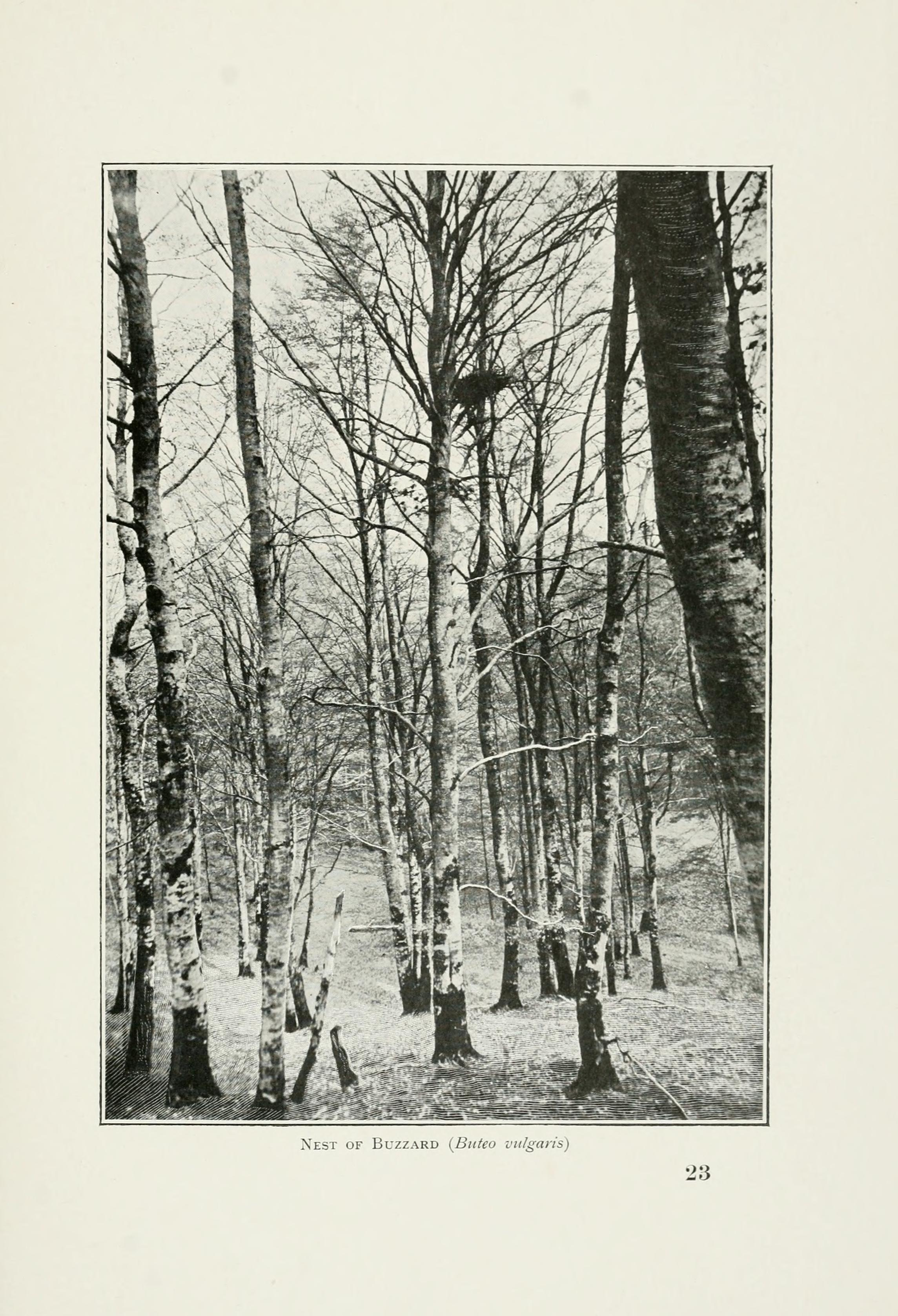

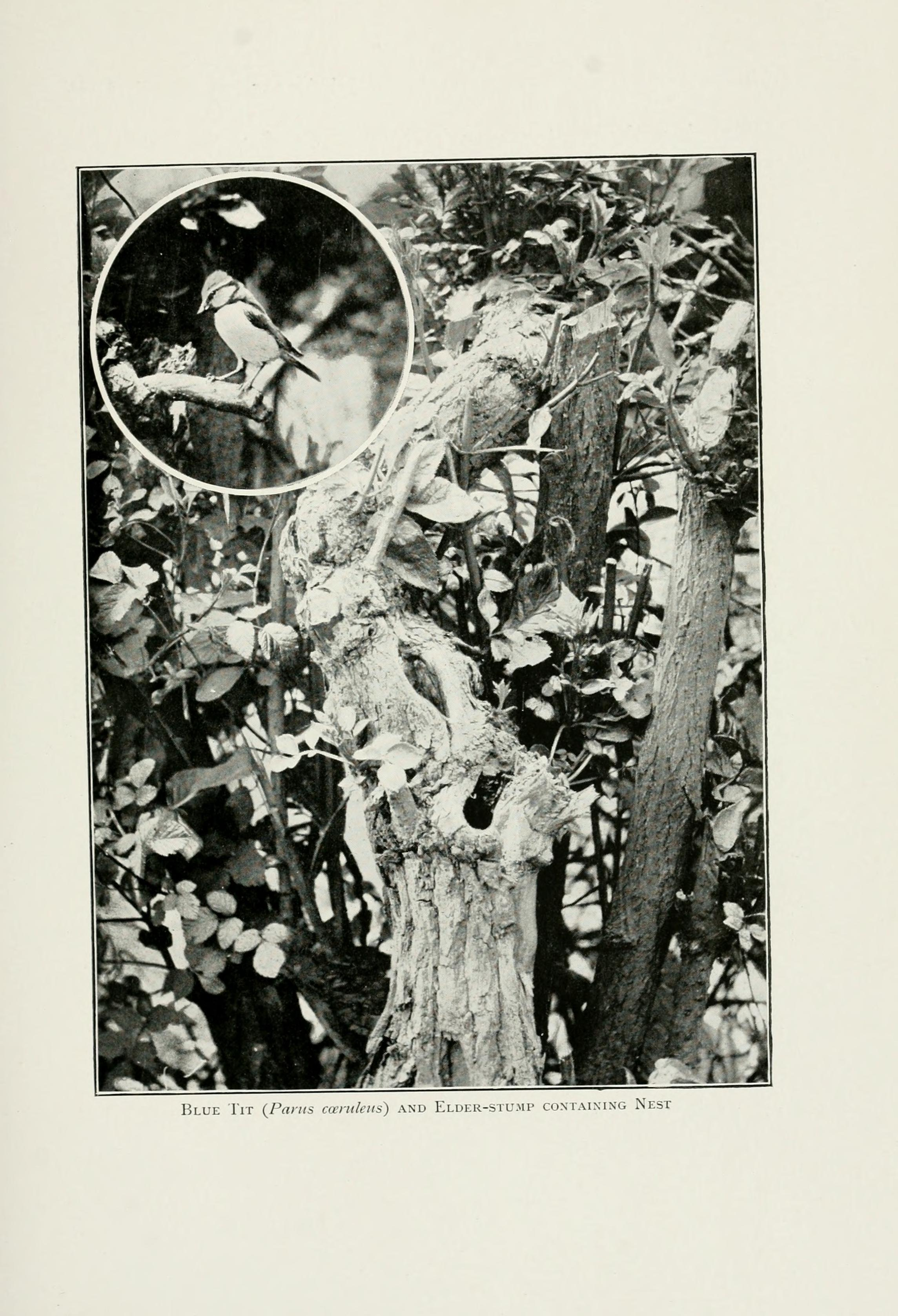

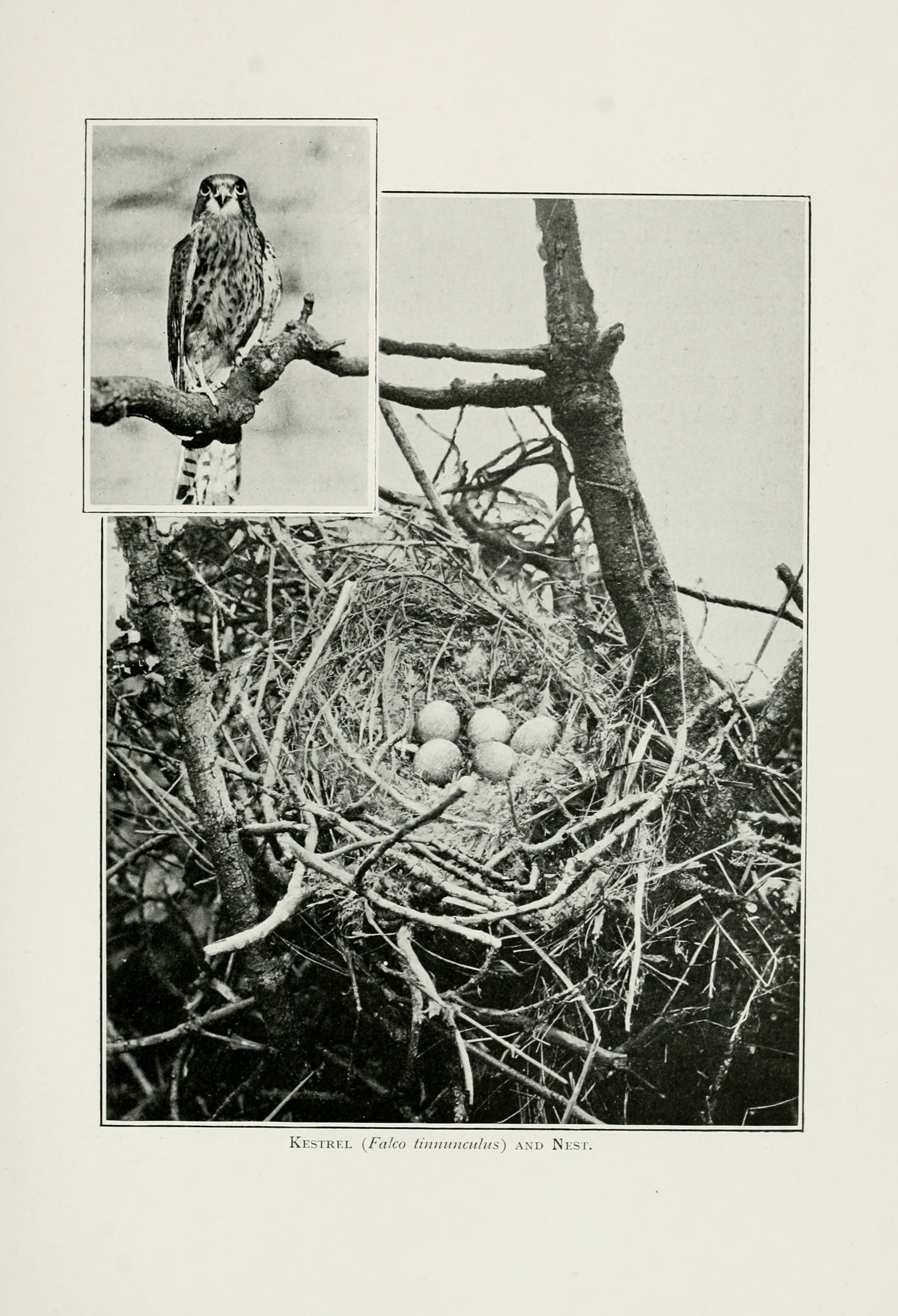

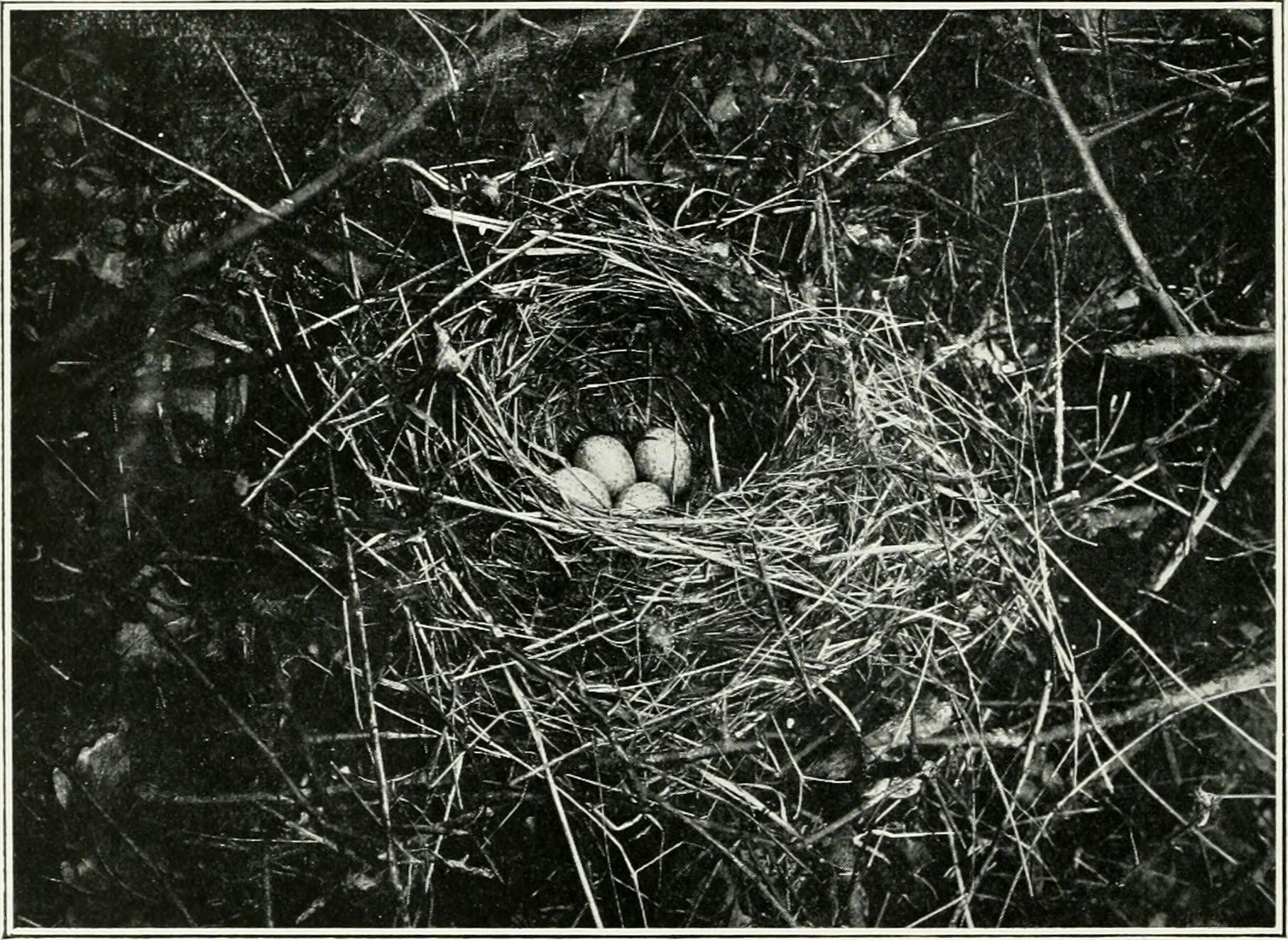

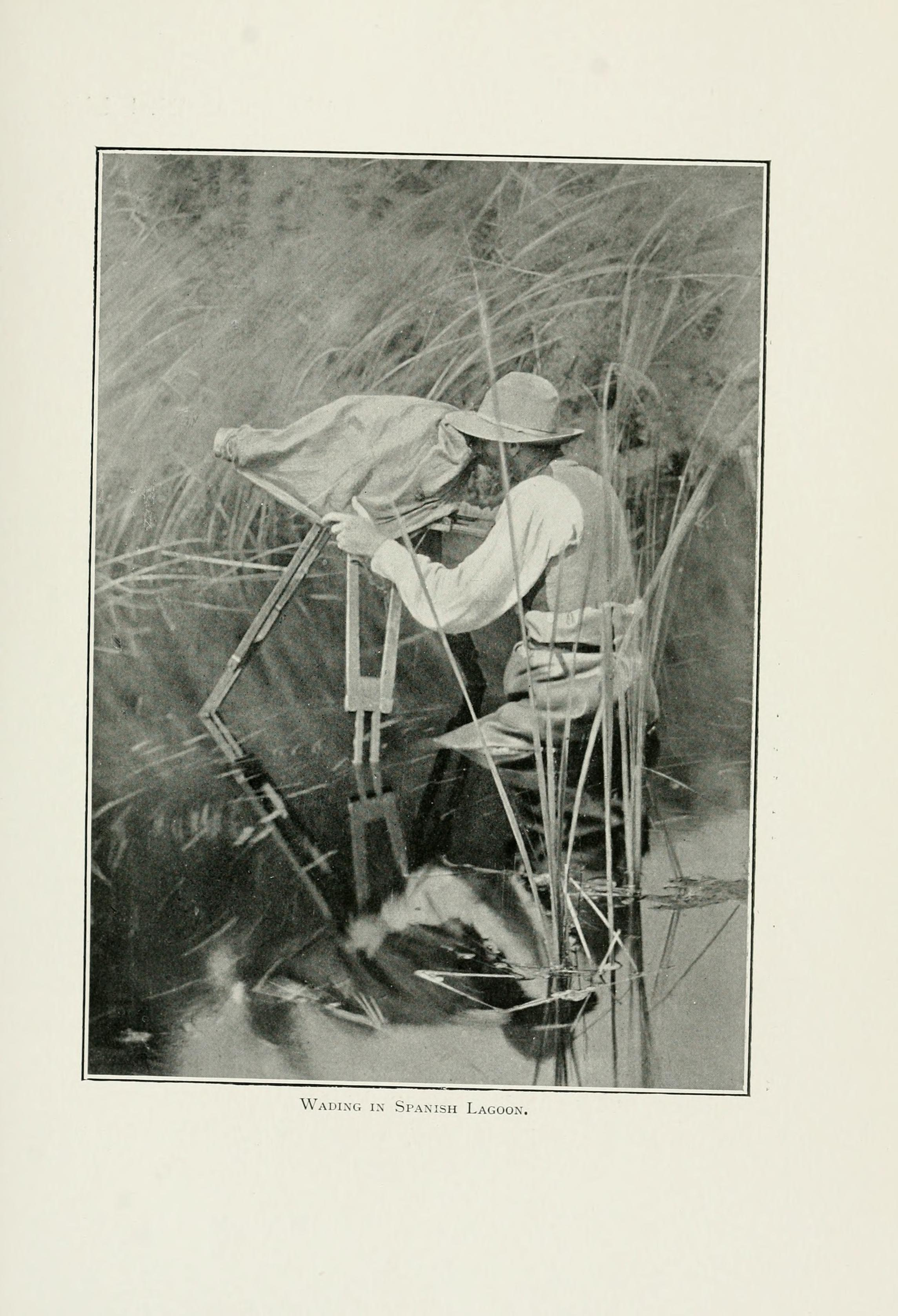
Wading in Spanish Lagoon

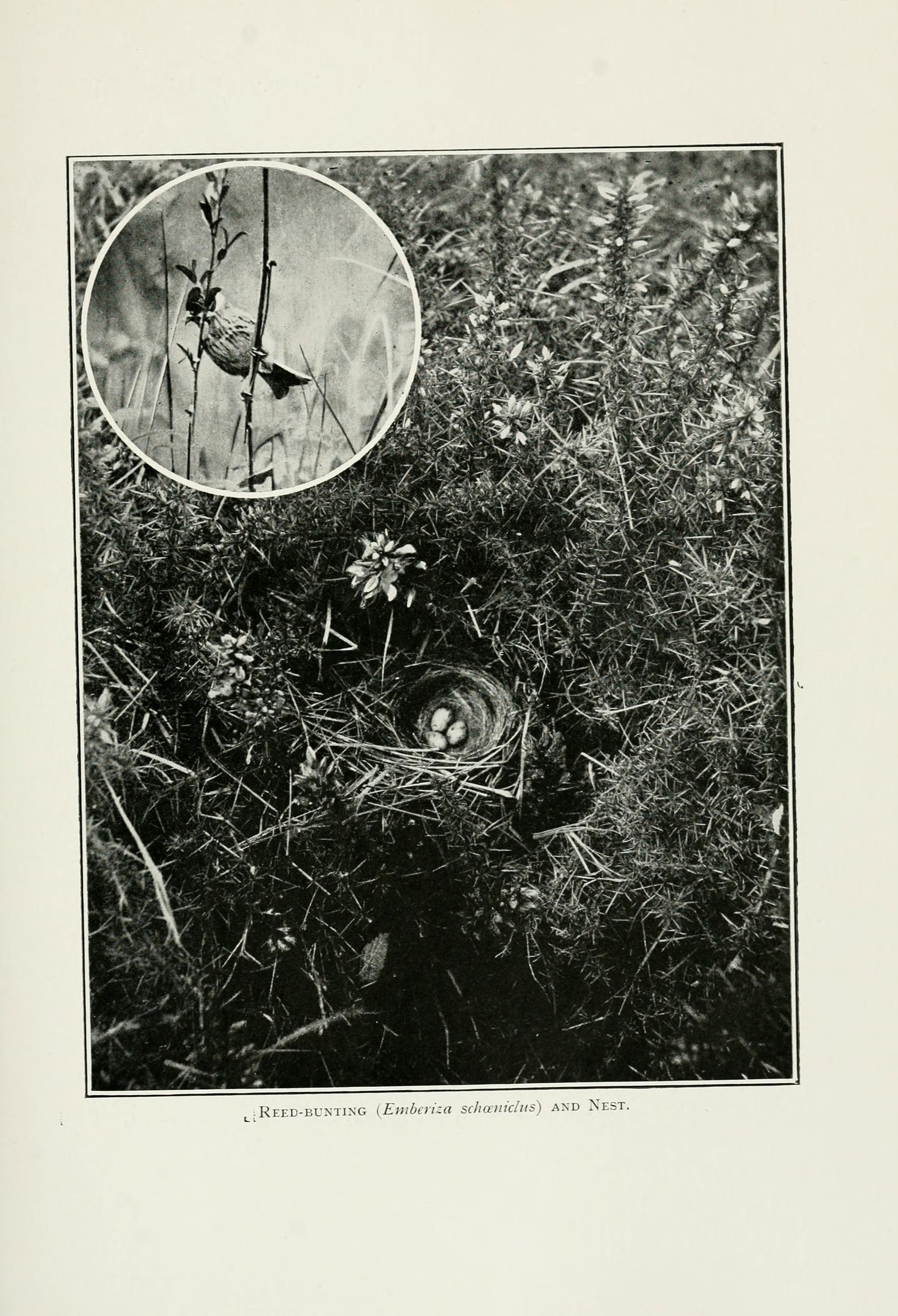

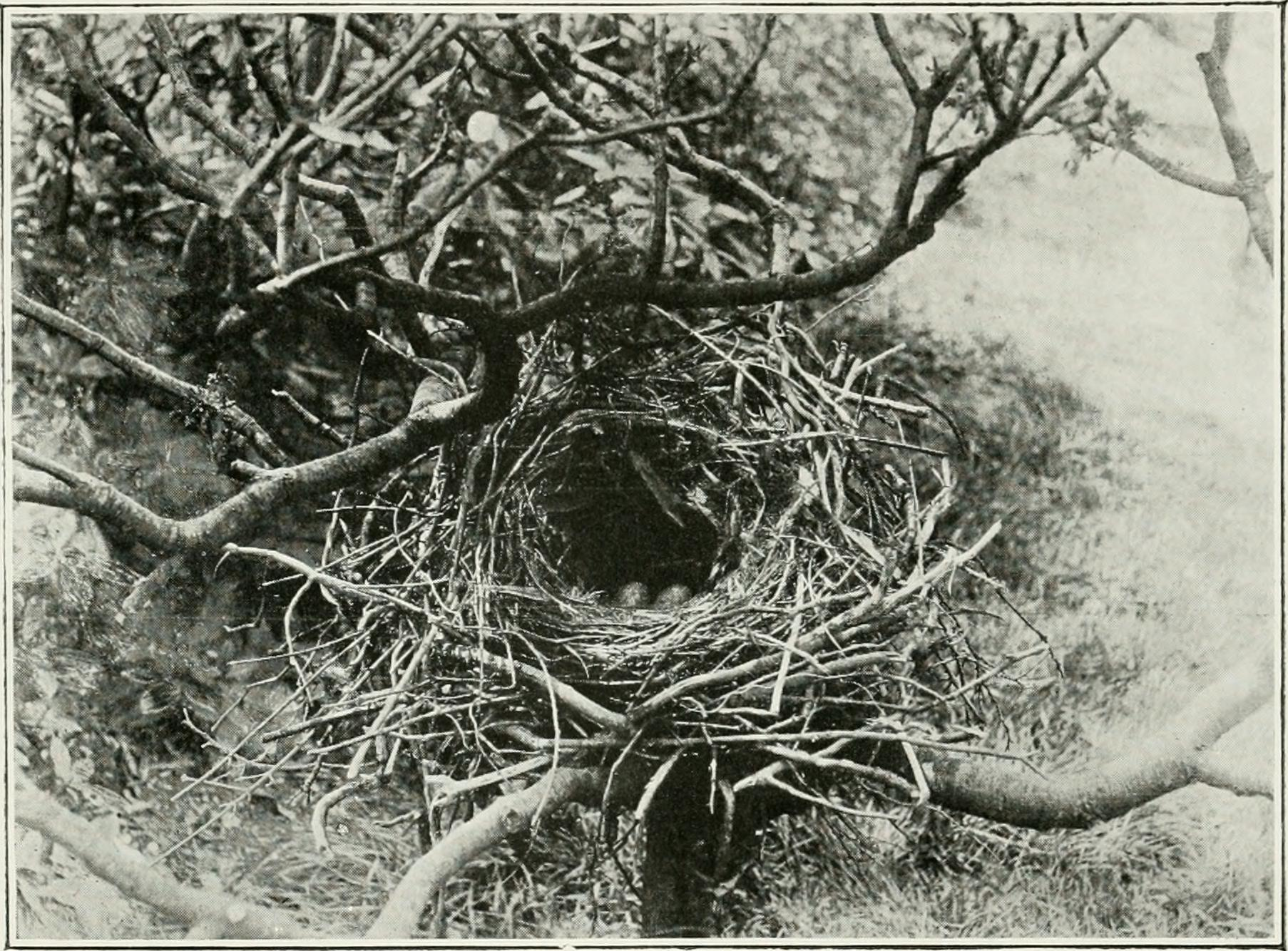

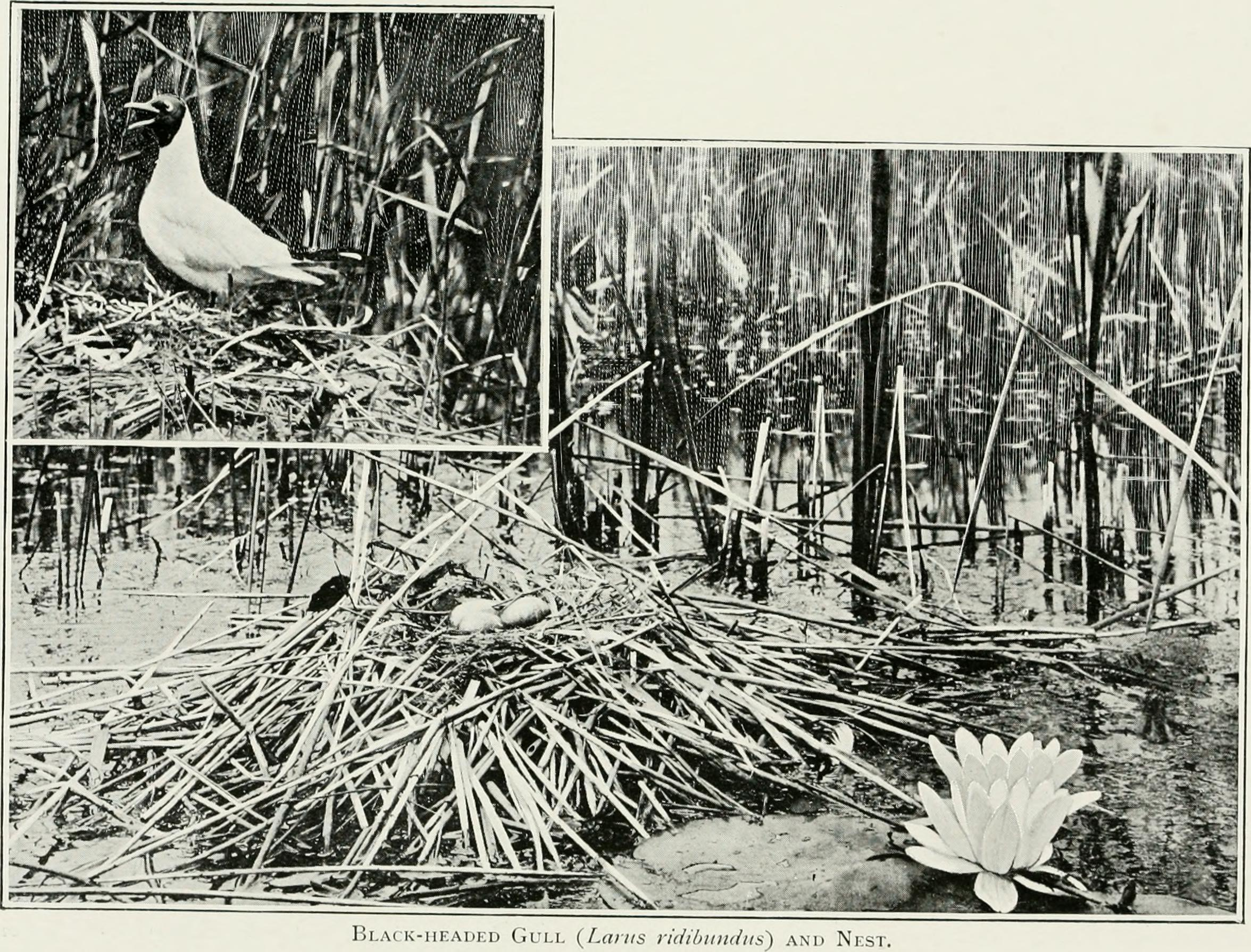

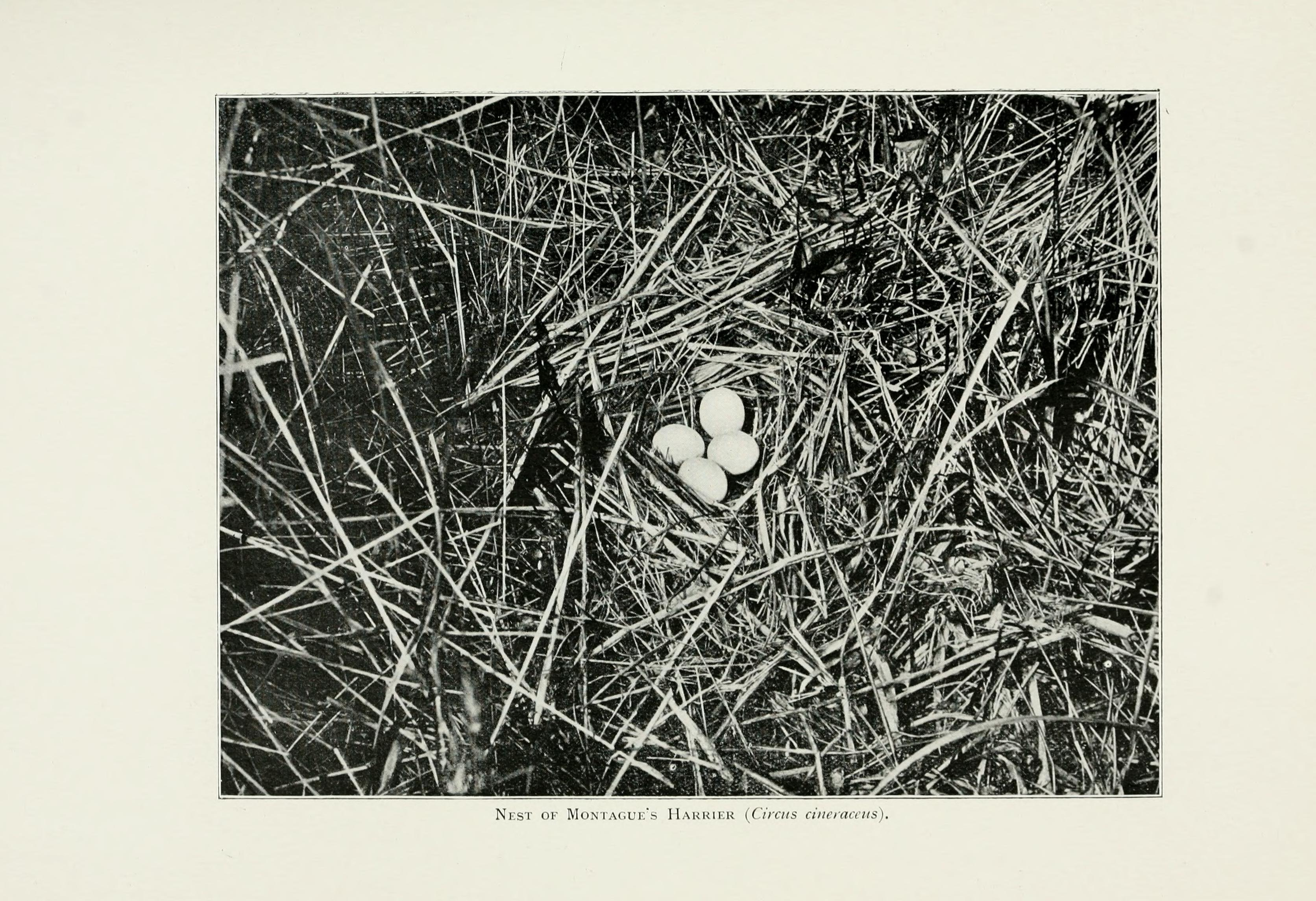

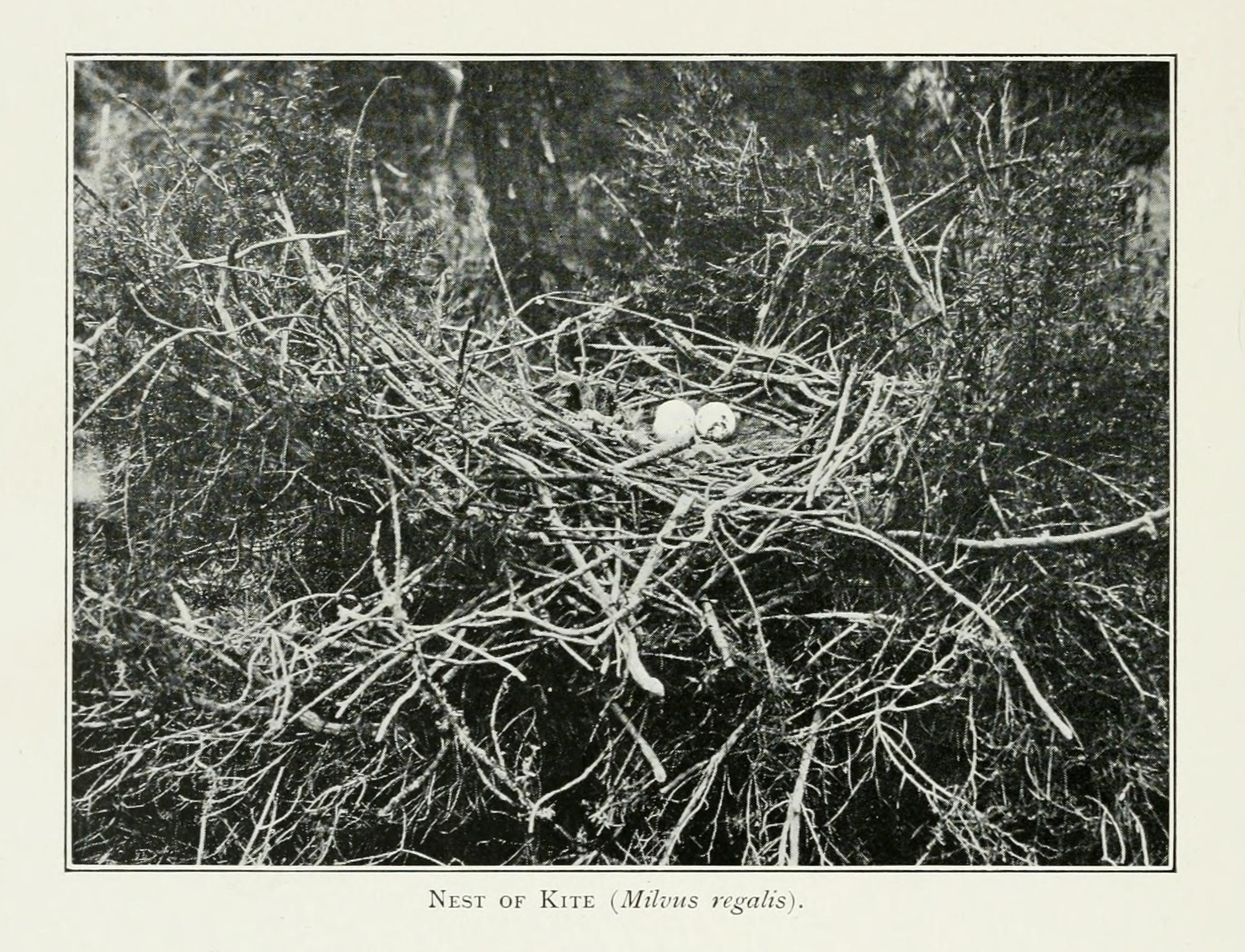

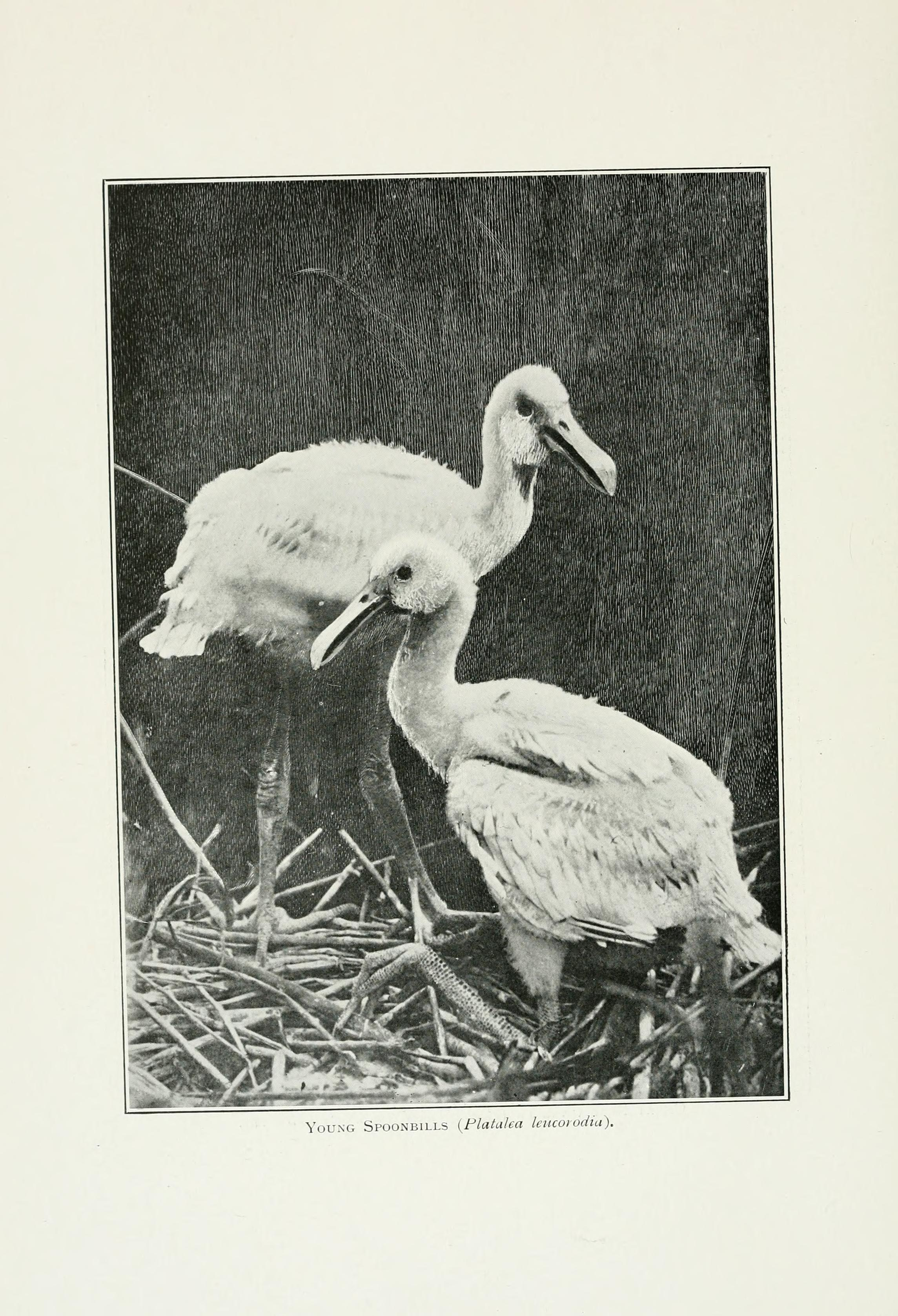

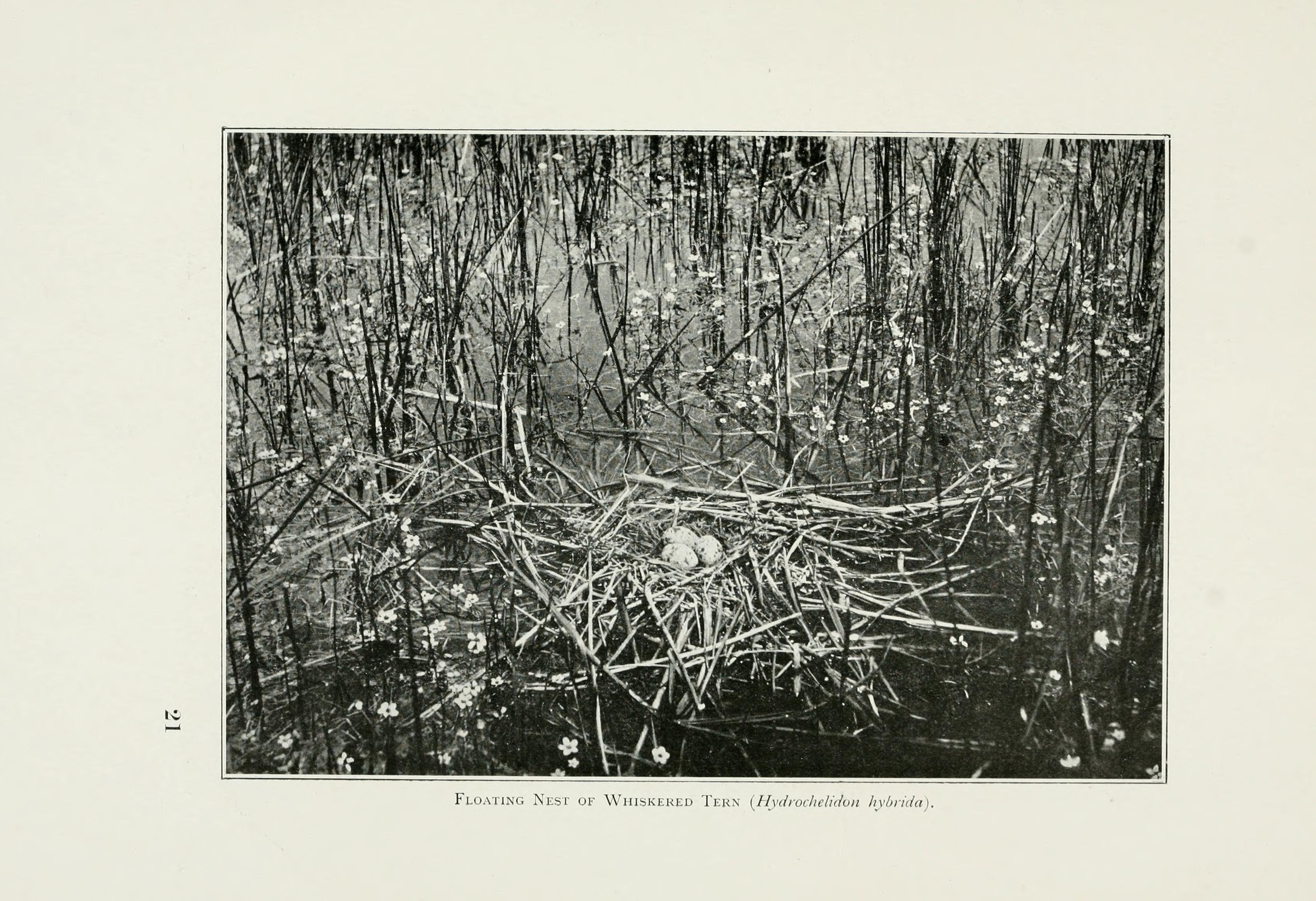

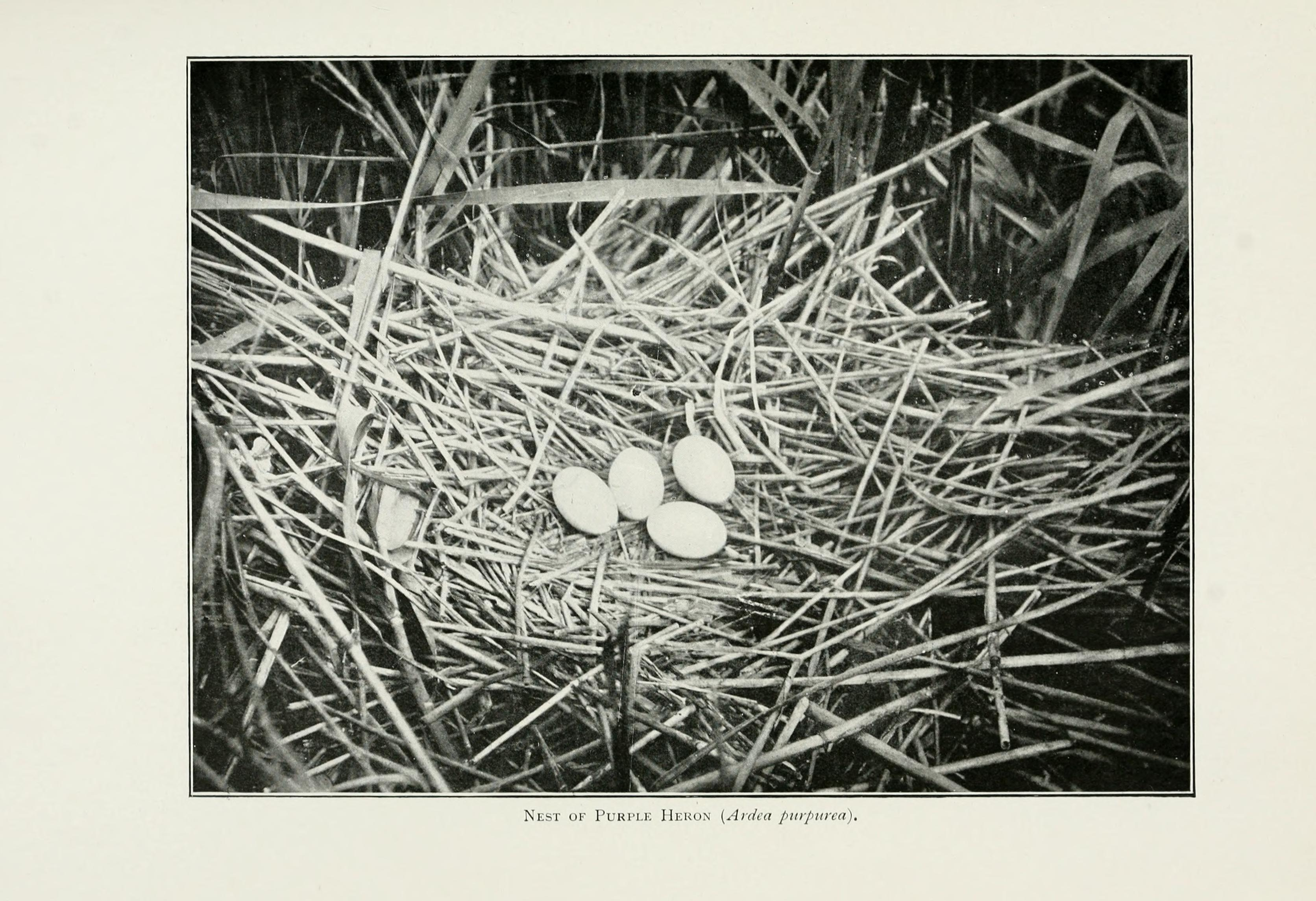

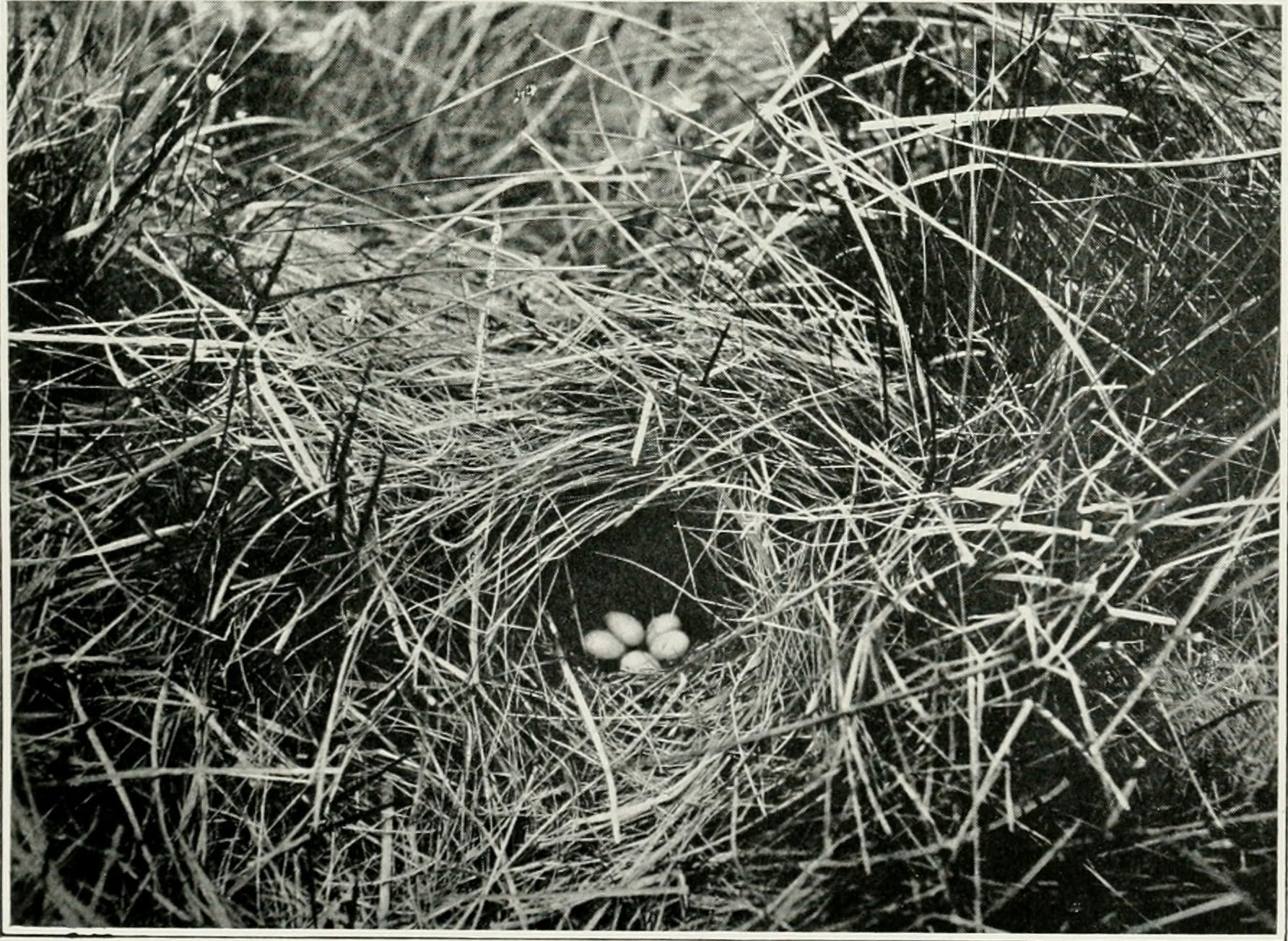

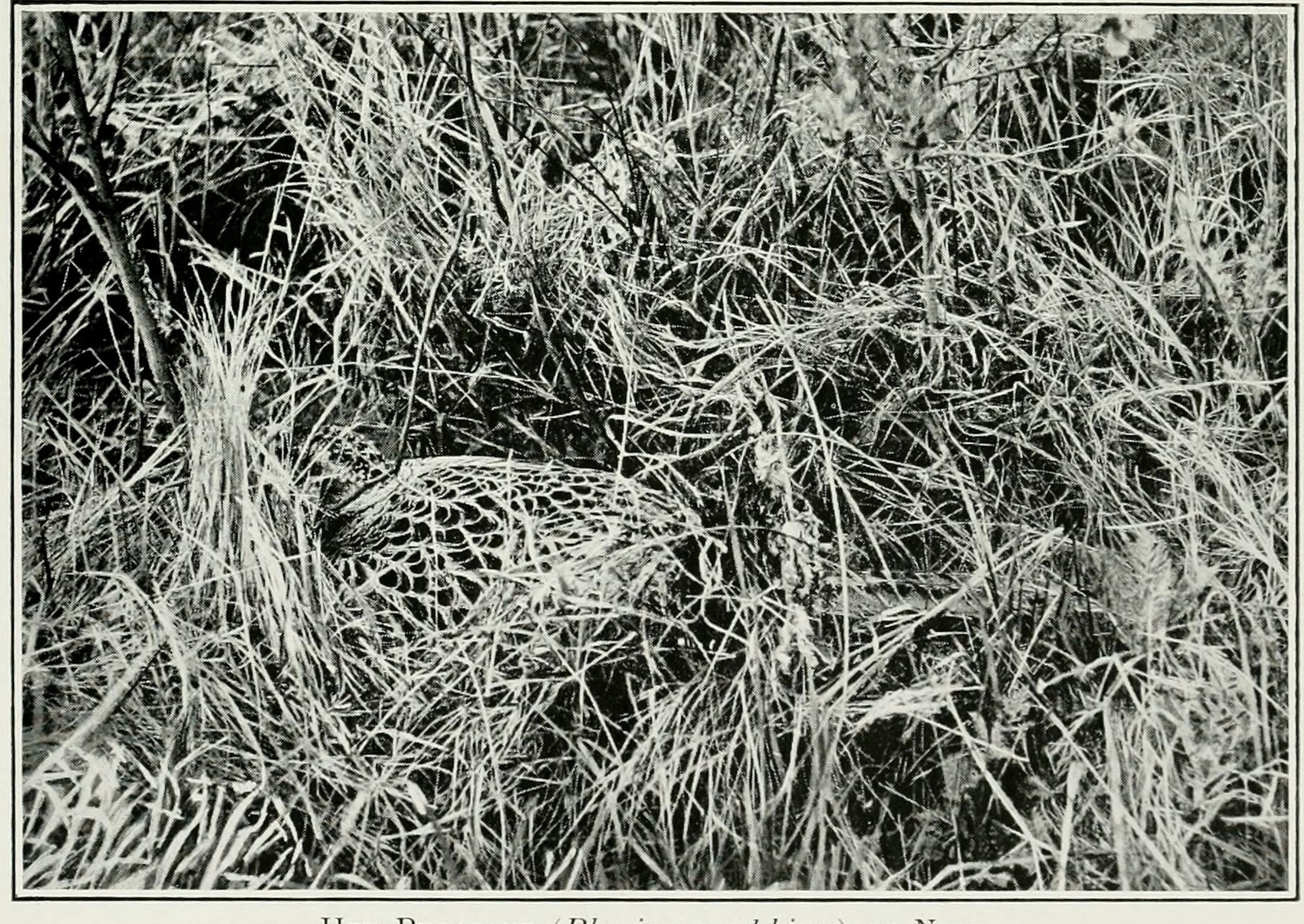

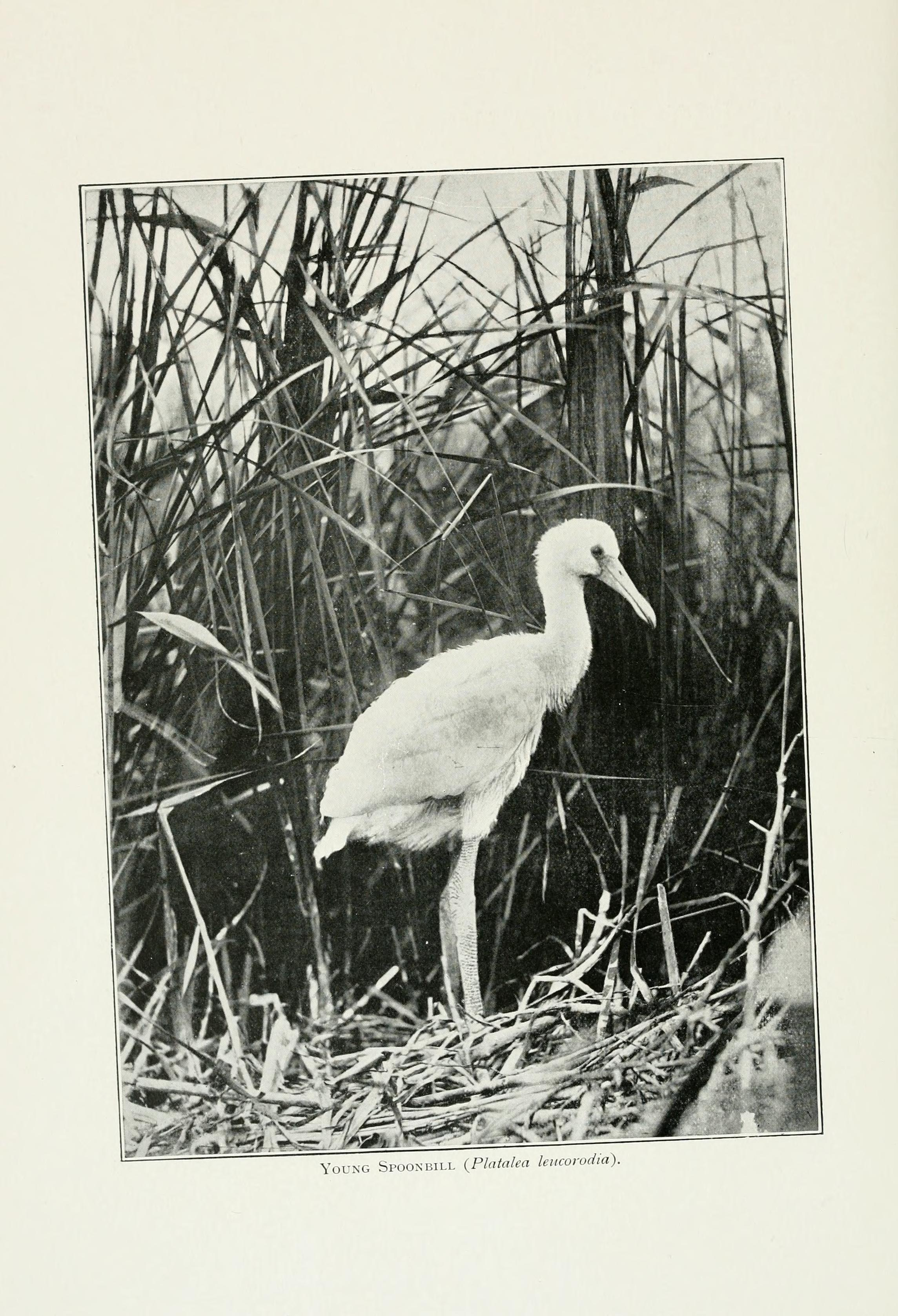

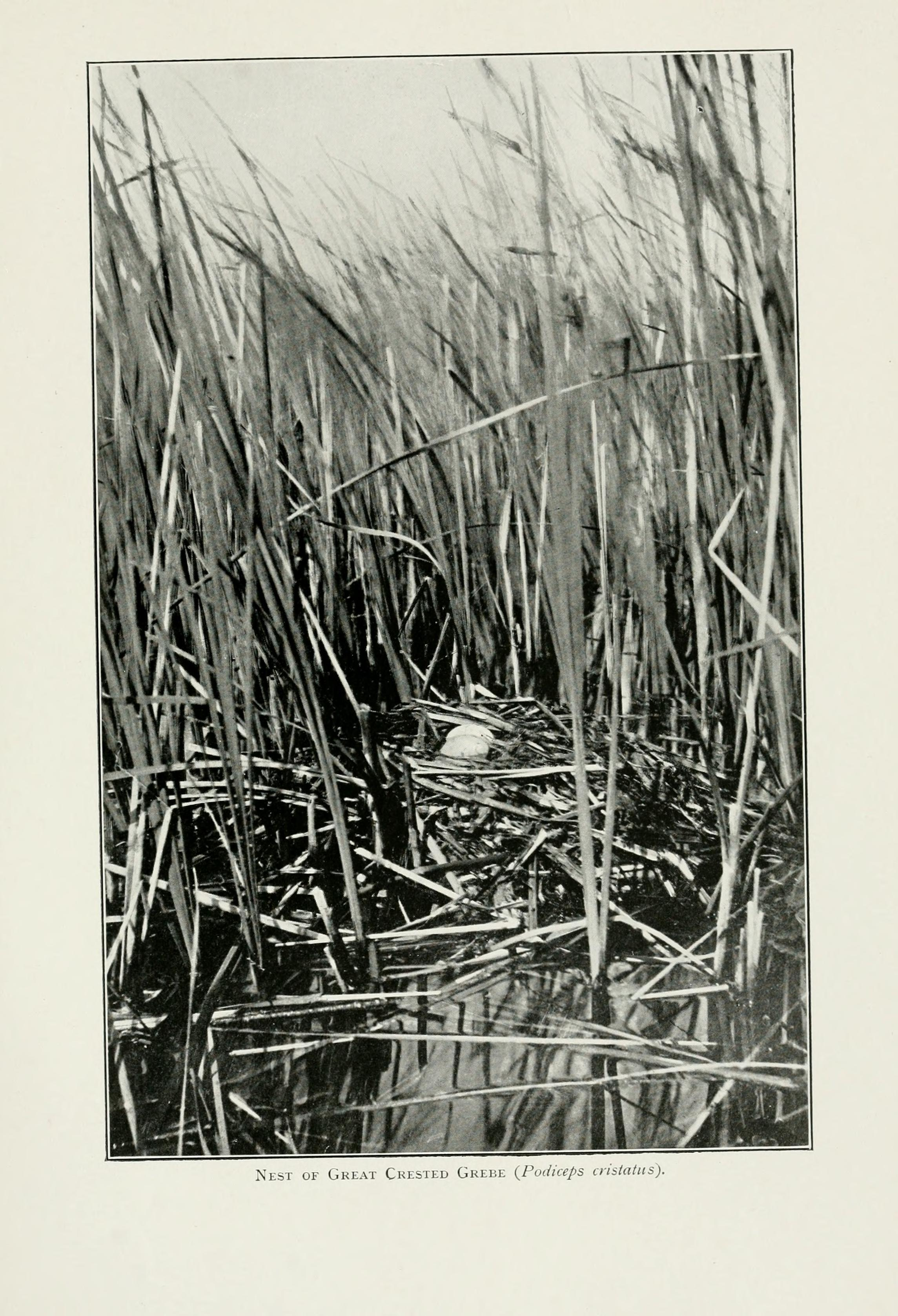

== See also ==
- John Gould
