= List of Stoke City F.C. players (1–24 appearances) =

Stoke City F.C. is an English association football club based in Stoke-on-Trent, Staffordshire. The club was formed in 1863 as Stoke Ramblers F.C., and played their first competitive match in November 1883, when they entered the First Round of the 1883–84 FA Cup. In 1888 they joined the inaugural Football League thus becoming founding members. The club was renamed Stoke City F.C. in 1925, and they moved to Britannia Stadium in 1997. Since playing their first competitive match, more than 1000 players have made a competitive first-team appearance for the club, many of whom have played under 25 matches (including substitute appearances); those players are listed here.

== List of players ==
- Appearances and goals are for first-team competitive matches only, including Premier League, Football League, Football Alliance, Birmingham & District League, Southern League, FA Cup, League Cup, League Trophy, UEFA Cup/UEFA Europa League, Anglo-Italian Cup, Birmingham League Cup, Full Members' Cup, United Counties League, Texaco Cup and Watney Cup. Wartime matches are regarded as unofficial and are excluded.
- The list is ordered first by number of appearances in total.
- Highlighted players members of the current squad.

Statistics correct as of match played 21 November 2026

Table headers

- Nationality – If a player played international football, the country/countries he played for are shown. Otherwise, the player's nationality is given as their country of birth.
- Stoke City career – The year of the player's first appearance for Stoke City to the year of his last appearance.
- Starts – The number of games started.
- Sub – The number of games played as a substitute.
- Total – The total number of games played, both as a starter and as a substitute.

Positions key
| Pre-1960s | | Post-1960s | |
|---|---|---|---|
| GK | Goalkeeper | | |
| FB | Full back | DF | Defender |
| HB | Half back | MF | Midfielder |
| FW | Forward | | |
| U | Utility player^{1} | | |

| Name | Nationality | Position | Stoke City career | Starts | Subs | Total | Goals |
| Name | Nationality | Position | Stoke City career | Appearances | | | Goals |
|---|---|---|---|---|---|---|---|
| Jimmy Adam | Scotland | MF | 1961–1962 | 24 | 0 | 24 | 7 |
| John Anderson | Australia | FW | 1957–1961 | 24 | 0 | 24 | 2 |
| John Bamber | England | DF | 1933–1938 | 24 | 0 | 24 | 1 |
| Len Benbow | England | FW | 1900–1901 | 24 | 0 | 24 | 4 |
| Harry Croxton | England | HB | 1905–1908 | 24 | 0 | 24 | 1 |
| Tommy Dawson | England | DF | 1924–1929 | 24 | 0 | 24 | 0 |
| Jock Grieve | Scotland | MF | 1910–1911 | 24 | 0 | 24 | 1 |
| Jim Hingerty | England | FW | 1896–1897 | 24 | 0 | 24 | 8 |
| Jimmy Lee | England | GK | 1921–1922 | 24 | 0 | 24 | 0 |
| Jimmy Sayer | England | MF | 1883–1890 | 24 | 0 | 24 | 3 |
| Sam Surridge | England | FW | 2021–2022 | 9 | 15 | 24 | 4 |
| Taylor Harwood-Bellis | England | DF | 2021–2022 | 24 | 0 | 24 | 0 |
| Frank Elliott | Wales | DF | 1952–1954 | 23 | 0 | 23 | 0 |
| Amdy Faye | Senegal | MF | 2008–2010 | 19 | 4 | 23 | 0 |
| George Harris | England | FW | 1900–1904 | 23 | 0 | 23 | 5 |
| Jack Maddock | England | FB | 1919–1921 | 23 | 0 | 23 | 4 |
| Leigh Palin | England | MF | 1989–1990 | 21 | 2 | 23 | 3 |
| Victor Moses | Nigeria | FW | 2014–2015 | 22 | 1 | 23 | 3 |
| Liam Lindsay | Scotland | DF | 2019–2021 | 20 | 3 | 23 | 0 |
| Tashan Oakley-Boothe | England | MF | 2020–2023 | 7 | 16 | 23 | 0 |
| Liam Delap | England | FW | 2022–2023 | 15 | 8 | 23 | 3 |
| Emre Tezgel | England | FW | 2022– | 4 | 19 | 23 | 2 |
| Bill Caton | England | FW | 1947–1950 | 22 | 0 | 22 | 2 |
| Verdi Godwin | England | FW | 1949–1950 | 22 | 0 | 22 | 2 |
| Arnar Gunnlaugsson | Iceland | MF | 2000–2002 | 22 | 0 | 22 | 5 |
| Archie Heggarty | Ireland | MF | 1912–1913 | 22 | 0 | 22 | 1 |
| Alec Lindsay | England | DF | 1977–1978 | 22 | 0 | 22 | 3 |
| Bob McSkimming | Scotland | FW | 1888–1889 | 22 | 0 | 22 | 6 |
| Jack Nibloe | England | FW | 1961–1962 | 22 | 0 | 22 | 5 |
| Wesley | Brazil | FW | 2023–2024 | 7 | 15 | 22 | 0 |
| Freddie Gee | England | FW | 1888–1889 | 21 | 0 | 21 | 5 |
| Micky Gynn | England | MF | 1993–1995 | 21 | 0 | 21 | 0 |
| Robert Heath | England | FW | 1996–2002 | 12 | 9 | 21 | 0 |
| Vic Horrocks | England | FW | 1908–1911 | 21 | 0 | 21 | 8 |
| Tommy Little | England | FW | 1920–1921 | 21 | 0 | 21 | 1 |
| Albert Mullard | England | FW | 1950–1951 | 21 | 0 | 21 | 5 |
| Seyi Olofinjana | Nigeria | MF | 2008–2009 | 17 | 4 | 21 | 2 |
| Louis Page | England | FW | 1919–1922 | 21 | 0 | 21 | 1 |
| Jack Palethorpe | England | FW | 1932–1933 | 21 | 0 | 21 | 11 |
| Jock Stirling | Scotland | FW | 1919–1920 | 21 | 0 | 21 | 1 |
| Jonathan Woodgate | England | DF | 2011–2012 | 20 | 1 | 21 | 0 |
| Marco van Ginkel | Netherlands | MF | 2015–2016 | 12 | 9 | 21 | 0 |
| Sead Hakšabanović | Montenegro | MF | 2023–2014 | 12 | 9 | 21 | 1 |
| Sol Sidibe | England | MF | 2023–2025 | 9 | 12 | 21 | 0 |
| Len Hales | England | FW | 1898–1902 | 20 | 0 | 20 | 4 |
| Graham Matthews | England | FW | 1960–1963 | 20 | 0 | 20 | 5 |
| Junior N'Galula | Belgium | MF | 2005–2006 | 20 | 0 | 20 | 0 |
| Harry Pugh | Wales | MF | 1887–1898 | 20 | 0 | 20 | 1 |
| Bill Sawers | Scotland | FW | 1893–1895 | 20 | 0 | 20 | 5 |
| Leslie Scott | England | GK | 1922–1923 | 20 | 0 | 20 | 0 |
| Barry Siddall | England | GK | 1984–1986 | 20 | 0 | 20 | 0 |
| Tom Thornton | England | FW | 1910–1911 | 20 | 0 | 20 | 1 |
| Steve Sidwell | England | MF | 2014–2016 | 8 | 12 | 20 | 0 |
| Rhys Norrington-Davies | Wales | DF | 2021–2021 | 20 | 0 | 20 | 1 |
| D'Margio Wright-Phillips | Grenada | MF | 2022–2024 | 8 | 12 | 20 | 2 |
| Tariqe Fosu | Ghana | MF | 2022–2023 | 13 | 7 | 20 | 0 |
| Harry Clarke | England | DF | 2022–2023 | 10 | 10 | 20 | 2 |
| Paul Allen | England | MF | 1994–1995 | 19 | 0 | 19 | 1 |
| Adrian Capes | England | FW | 1905–1907 | 19 | 0 | 19 | 2 |
| Peter Dowds | Scotland | DF | 1892–1893 | 19 | 0 | 19 | 0 |
| Brian Doyle | England | DF | 1950–1953 | 19 | 0 | 19 | 0 |
| Billy Heames | England | FW | 1893–1897 | 19 | 0 | 19 | 3 |
| Chris Kelly | England | DF | 1908–1909 | 19 | 0 | 19 | 1 |
| Samuel Meston | Scotland | HB | 1894–1895 | 19 | 0 | 19 | 4 |
| Adam Rooney | Republic of Ireland | FW | 2006–2008 | 2 | 17 | 19 | 4 |
| Michael Tonge | England | MF | 2008–2012 | 6 | 13 | 19 | 0 |
| Tancey Wharton | England | MF | 1913–1914 | 19 | 0 | 19 | 0 |
| Denis Wilson | England | DF | 1958–1961 | 19 | 0 | 19 | 0 |
| Kevin Wimmer | Austria | DF | 2017–2021 | 16 | 3 | 19 | 0 |
| Connor Taylor | England | DF | 2021–2023 | 14 | 5 | 19 | 0 |
| Daniel Iversen | Denmark | GK | 2024–2024 | 19 | 0 | 19 | 0 |
| José Andrade | Cape Verde | FW | 1995–1997 | 8 | 10 | 18 | 2 |
| Gary Bannister | England | FW | 1993–1994 | 12 | 6 | 18 | 2 |
| Tom Cowan | Scotland | DF | 1993–1994 | 18 | 0 | 18 | 0 |
| Birkir Kristinsson | Iceland | GK | 2000–2001 | 18 | 0 | 18 | 0 |
| Pétur Marteinsson | Iceland | MF | 2001–2003 | 18 | 0 | 18 | 2 |
| Brian Rice | Scotland | GK | 1991–1992 | 18 | 0 | 18 | 0 |
| Albert Whitehurst | England | FW | 1920–1923 | 18 | 0 | 18 | 4 |
| Enos Whittaker | England | DF | 1912–1913 | 18 | 0 | 18 | 1 |
| Bob Whittingham | England | FW | 1919–1920 | 18 | 0 | 18 | 8 |
| Paul Williams | England | DF | 2003–2004 | 17 | 1 | 18 | 0 |
| Cuco Martina | Curaçao | DF | 2018–2019 | 18 | 0 | 18 | 0 |
| Tommy Simkin | England | GK | 2023– | 18 | 0 | 18 | 0 |
| Djibril Soumaré | Senegal | MF | 2026– | 14 | 4 | 18 | 0 |
| Brian Bithell | England | DF | 1976–1977 | 16 | 1 | 17 | 0 |
| Ike Brookes | England | GK | 1891–1892 | 17 | 0 | 17 | 0 |
| Aaron Callaghan | Republic of Ireland | DF | 1984–1987 | 11 | 6 | 17 | 0 |
| John Clark | Scotland | DF | 1993–1994 | 17 | 0 | 17 | 0 |
| Peter Coupar | Scotland | FW | 1889–1891 | 17 | 0 | 17 | 6 |
| Billy Davies | Wales | FW | 1905–1907 | 17 | 0 | 17 | 1 |
| Keith Downing | England | MF | 1994–1995 | 17 | 0 | 17 | 0 |
| James Gorman | England | FW | 1908–1909 | 17 | 0 | 17 | 7 |
| Frank Hesham | England | FW | 1904–1905 | 17 | 0 | 17 | 1 |
| Vince Hilaire | England | MF | 1988–1991 | 17 | 0 | 17 | 3 |
| Kofi Nyamah | England | DF | 1996–1998 | 17 | 0 | 17 | 0 |
| David Rowson | Scotland | MF | 2001–2003 | 10 | 7 | 17 | 0 |
| Ibrahima Sonko | Senegal | DF | 2008–2011 | 10 | 7 | 17 | 0 |
| Stephen Wright | England | DF | 2007–2008 | 15 | 2 | 17 | 0 |
| Stephen Ward | Republic of Ireland | DF | 2019–2020 | 17 | 0 | 17 | 0 |
| Josh Maja | Nigeria | FW | 2021–2022 | 11 | 6 | 17 | 2 |
| Keith Andrews | Republic of Ireland | MF | 2003–2004 | 16 | 0 | 16 | 0 |
| Steve Banks | England | GK | 2002–2003 | 16 | 0 | 16 | 0 |
| John Brown | England | FW | 1910–1911 | 16 | 0 | 16 | 7 |
| John Devine | Republic of Ireland | MF | 1985–1986 | 16 | 0 | 16 | 0 |
| Billy Hendry | Scotland | DF | 1888–1889 | 16 | 0 | 16 | 1 |
| Jason Kearton | Australia | GK | 1991–1992 | 16 | 0 | 16 | 0 |
| Kevin W. Lewis | England | DF | 1972–1976 | 16 | 0 | 16 | 0 |
| Sam McAllister | Scotland | FW | 1908–1909 | 16 | 0 | 16 | 3 |
| James Martin | England | FW | 1919–1920 | 16 | 0 | 16 | 1 |
| Fred Molyneux | England | FW | 1897–1898 | 16 | 0 | 16 | 5 |
| Martin Paterson | Northern Ireland | FW | 2004–2007 | 2 | 14 | 16 | 1 |
| John Spencer | England | FW | 1920–1921 | 16 | 0 | 16 | 0 |
| Alfie Doughty | England | MF | 2021–2022 | 5 | 11 | 16 | 0 |
| Luke Cundle | England | MF | 2024–2024 | 11 | 5 | 16 | 2 |
| Jesurun Rak-Sakyi | Ghana | MF | 2026–2026 | 8 | 8 | 16 | 2 |
| Ethan Galbraith | Northern Ireland | MF | 2026– | 16 | 0 | 16 | 3 |
| Luke Graham | Scotland | DF | 2026– | 16 | 0 | 16 | 1 |
| George Hirst | Scotland | FW | 2026– | 6 | 10 | 16 | 2 |
| Ben Johnson | England | DF | 2026– | 16 | 0 | 16 | 1 |
| Roy Beckett | England | DF | 1946–1952 | 15 | 0 | 15 | 1 |
| Stan Bevans | England | FW | 1950–1955 | 15 | 0 | 15 | 1 |
| Ashley Grimes | Republic of Ireland | MF | 1991–1992 | 7 | 8 | 15 | 1 |
| Fred Hargraves | England | FW | 1908–1909 | 15 | 0 | 15 | 11 |
| Bob Milarvie | Scotland | FW | 1888–1889 | 15 | 0 | 15 | 5 |
| Kevin Sheldon | England | MF | 1975–1981 | 12 | 3 | 15 | 0 |
| Dennis Thorley | England | FW | 1976–1981 | 11 | 4 | 15 | 0 |
| Danny Tiatto | Australia | FW | 1997–1998 | 15 | 0 | 15 | 1 |
| Scott Hogan | Republic of Ireland | FW | 2019–2020 | 5 | 10 | 15 | 3 |
| Cameron Carter-Vickers | United States | DF | 2019–2020 | 14 | 1 | 15 | 0 |
| Angus Gunn | England | GK | 2020–2021 | 14 | 1 | 15 | 0 |
| Leo Østigård | Norway | DF | 2021–2022 | 14 | 1 | 15 | 1 |
| Ali Al-Hamadi | Iraq | FW | 2025–2025 | 11 | 4 | 15 | 2 |
| Gilbert Brookes | England | GK | 1922–1923 | 14 | 0 | 14 | 0 |
| Tom Cain | England | GK | 1893–1894 | 14 | 0 | 14 | 0 |
| Peter Ford | England | HB | 1956–1959 | 14 | 0 | 14 | 0 |
| Jonathan Fortune | England | DF | 2006–2007 | 14 | 0 | 14 | 1 |
| Martin Kolář | Czech Republic | MF | 2005–2006 | 14 | 0 | 14 | 1 |
| Arthur Leonard | England | FW | 1904–1905 | 14 | 0 | 14 | 3 |
| Lee Martin | England | MF | 2006–2007 | 5 | 9 | 14 | 1 |
| Wilf Phillips | England | FW | 1919–1920 | 14 | 0 | 14 | 3 |
| Frank Richardson | England | FW | 1922–1923 | 14 | 0 | 14 | 3 |
| Billy Robson | England | FW | 1933–1937 | 14 | 0 | 14 | 6 |
| John Roxburgh | Scotland | FW | 1923–1924 | 14 | 0 | 14 | 1 |
| Adam Federici | Australia | GK | 2018–2020 | 14 | 0 | 14 | 0 |
| Jack Clarke | England | MF | 2021–2021 | 6 | 8 | 14 | 0 |
| Mark Travers | Republic of Ireland | GK | 2023–2023 | 14 | 0 | 14 | 0 |
| Milan Smit | Netherlands | FW | 2026– | 7 | 7 | 14 | 2 |
| John Carew | Norway | FW | 2010–2011 | 11 | 2 | 13 | 2 |
| Richard Dryden | England | DF | 1999–2000 | 13 | 0 | 13 | 0 |
| Mike Flynn | England | DF | 2001–2002 | 13 | 0 | 13 | 0 |
| John Gidman | England | DF | 1988–1989 | 9 | 4 | 13 | 0 |
| Thomas Greaves | England | FW | 1908–1910 | 13 | 0 | 13 | 5 |
| Charles James | England | DF | 1909–1914 | 13 | 0 | 13 | 0 |
| John Jones | Wales | FW | 1905–1907 | 13 | 0 | 13 | 3 |
| George Lawton (1862) | England | MF | 1888–1889 | 13 | 0 | 13 | 1 |
| Gordon Marshall | Scotland | GK | 1993–1994 | 13 | 0 | 13 | 0 |
| John Moore | England | DF | 1967–1968 | 12 | 1 | 13 | 0 |
| Frazer Richardson | England | DF | 2003–2004 | 13 | 0 | 13 | 1 |
| Teddy Sandland | England | FW | 1894–1895 | 13 | 0 | 13 | 3 |
| Tom Soares | England | MF | 2008–2012 | 8 | 5 | 13 | 0 |
| Jesé | Spain | FW | 2017–2018 | 8 | 5 | 13 | 1 |
| Thibaud Verlinden | Belgium | MF | 2017–2021 | 2 | 11 | 13 | 0 |
| Percy Brooke | England | FB | 1919–1920 | 12 | 0 | 12 | 0 |
| Deon Burton | Jamaica | FW | 2001–2002 | 11 | 1 | 12 | 2 |
| Albert Cook | England | MF | 1906–1908 | 12 | 0 | 12 | 1 |
| Mark Crossley | England | GK | 2002–2003 | 12 | 0 | 12 | 0 |
| Wayne Ebanks | England | DF | 1984–1985 | 12 | 0 | 12 | 0 |
| John Evans | England | FW | 1924–1925 | 12 | 0 | 12 | 0 |
| Paul Holsgrove | England | MF | 1997–1998 | 12 | 0 | 12 | 1 |
| Steve Kirk | Scotland | MF | 1981–1982 | 12 | 0 | 12 | 0 |
| Kenny Lowe | England | MF | 1993–1994 | 7 | 5 | 12 | 0 |
| Bob McCormick | Scotland | FW | 1888–1889 | 12 | 0 | 12 | 2 |
| Jimmy McVay | England | DF | 1911–1913 | 12 | 0 | 12 | 0 |
| Lee Mills | England | FW | 2002–2003 | 7 | 4 | 12 | 2 |
| Tommy Mooney | England | FW | 2002–2003 | 12 | 0 | 12 | 3 |
| Fred Pentland | England | FW | 1912–1913 | 12 | 0 | 12 | 6 |
| Billy Poole | England | U | 1921–1922 | 12 | 0 | 12 | 0 |
| James Sheridan | Ireland | FW | 1904–1905 | 12 | 0 | 12 | 1 |
| Harry Simpson | Scotland | MF | 1889–1890 | 12 | 0 | 12 | 3 |
| Neville Southall | Wales | GK | 1997–1998 | 12 | 0 | 12 | 0 |
| Nigel Worthington | Northern Ireland | MF | 1996–1997 | 12 | 0 | 12 | 0 |
| Luca Bombino | United States | DF | 2026– | 5 | 7 | 12 | 0 |
| Jack McGlynn | United States | MF | 2026– | 10 | 2 | 12 | 5 |
| Justin Devenny | Northern Ireland | MF | 2026– | 10 | 2 | 12 | 2 |
| Ernest Boulton | England | FW | 1910–1911 | 11 | 0 | 11 | 6 |
| Bruce Dyer | England | FW | 2005–2006 | 11 | 0 | 11 | 0 |
| Arthur Evans | England | GK | 1893–1894 | 11 | 0 | 11 | 0 |
| Tony Gallimore | England | DF | 1990–1993 | 11 | 0 | 11 | 0 |
| Jimmy Gemmell | Scotland | FW | 1906–1907 | 11 | 0 | 11 | 3 |
| Geoff Hickson | England | GK | 1959–1961 | 11 | 0 | 11 | 0 |
| Andy Holmes | England | DF | 1987–1990 | 9 | 2 | 11 | 0 |
| Fred McCarthy | England | FW | 1914–1915 | 11 | 0 | 11 | 8 |
| Syd Mellor | England | HB | 1920–1921 | 11 | 0 | 11 | 1 |
| Bert Miller | England | GK | 1908–1908 | 11 | 0 | 11 | 0 |
| Carlo Nash | England | GK | 2007–2008; 2010–2013 | 11 | 0 | 11 | 0 |
| Michael Ricketts | England | FW | 2004–2005 | 11 | 0 | 11 | 0 |
| Colin Russell | England | FW | 1983–1984 | 11 | 0 | 11 | 2 |
| Jimmy Sloane | Scotland | FW | 1888–1889 | 11 | 0 | 11 | 1 |
| George Stentiford | England | HB | 1923–1924 | 11 | 0 | 11 | 0 |
| Terry Williams | England | MF | 1985–1987 | 11 | 0 | 11 | 0 |
| Ron Wilson | England | DF | 1959–1964 | 11 | 0 | 11 | 0 |
| John Woodward | England | FW | 1964–1967 | 10 | 1 | 11 | 0 |
| Shay Given | Republic of Ireland | GK | 2015–2017 | 11 | 0 | 11 | 0 |
| Wilfried Bony | Ivory Coast | FW | 2016–2017 | 10 | 1 | 11 | 2 |
| Rabbi Matondo | Wales | FW | 2021–2021 | 5 | 6 | 11 | 1 |
| Jaden Philogene | England | FW | 2021–2022 | 6 | 5 | 11 | 1 |
| Micky Adams | England | DF | 1993–1994 | 10 | 0 | 10 | 3 |
| Ian Allinson | England | FW | 1987–1988 | 7 | 3 | 10 | 0 |
| Dave Beswick | England | GK | 1929–1932 | 10 | 0 | 10 | 0 |
| Darren Boughey | England | FW | 1989–1992 | 5 | 5 | 10 | 0 |
| Arthur Brookfield | England | MF | 1894–1895 | 10 | 0 | 10 | 2 |
| Billy Eardley | England | FW | 1896–1897 | 10 | 0 | 10 | 1 |
| George Jackson | England | MF | 1971–1972 | 8 | 2 | 10 | 0 |
| Frank Jordan | England | FW | 1911–1912 | 10 | 0 | 10 | 2 |
| James Maxwell | Scotland | FW | 1925–1926 | 10 | 0 | 10 | 0 |
| Bert Mitchell | England | FW | 1946–1947 | 10 | 0 | 10 | 2 |
| Syd Owen | England | FW | 1906–1907 | 10 | 0 | 10 | 6 |
| Harry Taylor | England | FW | 1909–1910 | 10 | 0 | 10 | 4 |
| Edward Wordley | England | MF | 1946–1950 | 10 | 0 | 10 | 0 |
| Tommy Younger | Scotland | GK | 1960–1961 | 10 | 0 | 10 | 0 |
| Jack Benton | England | GK | 1904–1910 | 9 | 0 | 9 | 0 |
| Matthew Burton | England | FW | 1919–1920 | 9 | 0 | 9 | 2 |
| John Cameron | Scotland | FW | 1891–1892 | 9 | 0 | 9 | 4 |
| Wayne Clarke | England | FW | 1990–1991 | 9 | 0 | 9 | 3 |
| Joe Corrigan | England | GK | 1984–1985 | 9 | 0 | 9 | 0 |
| John Flowers | England | MF | 1963–1966 | 9 | 0 | 9 | 0 |
| Marco Gabbiadini | England | FW | 1997–1998 | 9 | 0 | 9 | 1 |
| Thomas Godfrey | Scotland | DF | 1927–1929 | 9 | 0 | 9 | 0 |
| Ade Hamnett | England | MF | 1909–1910 | 9 | 0 | 9 | 0 |
| William Holmes | England | FW | 1912–1914 | 9 | 0 | 9 | 4 |
| Colin Hutchinson | England | MF | 1954–1958 | 9 | 0 | 9 | 0 |
| Richdard Johnson | Australia | DF | 2003–2004 | 9 | 0 | 9 | 0 |
| John Lawton | England | FW | 1955–1956 | 9 | 0 | 9 | 3 |
| Tom Lonie | Scotland | FW | 1895–1896 | 9 | 0 | 9 | 4 |
| Billy MacDonald | Scotland | FW | 1901–1902 | 9 | 0 | 9 | 3 |
| Mike McDonald | Scotland | GK | 1972–1974 | 8 | 1 | 9 | 0 |
| Jimmy McGroarty | Northern Ireland | FW | 1977–1977 | 8 | 1 | 9 | 2 |
| Jack Moorwood | England | DF | 1920–1921 | 9 | 0 | 9 | 0 |
| Michael Owen | England | FW | 2012–2013 | 1 | 8 | 9 | 1 |
| Chris Riggott | England | DF | 2007–2008 | 9 | 0 | 9 | 0 |
| John Ruggiero | England | FW | 1976–1977 | 9 | 0 | 9 | 2 |
| Albert Savage | England | FW | 1910–1911 | 9 | 0 | 9 | 4 |
| Josip Skoko | Australia | MF | 2005–2006 | 9 | 0 | 9 | 2 |
| Tony Spearing | England | MF | 1984–1985 | 9 | 0 | 9 | 0 |
| Alan Suddick | England | MF | 1976–1977 | 9 | 0 | 9 | 1 |
| Sebastian Svärd | Denmark | DF | 2003–2004 | 9 | 0 | 9 | 1 |
| Steven Taaffe | England | MF | 1999–2000 | 4 | 5 | 9 | 0 |
| Lachie Thomson | England | FB | 1892–1894 | 9 | 0 | 9 | 0 |
| Billy Tunnicliffe | England | MF | 1888–1889 | 9 | 0 | 9 | 4 |
| Mark Walters | England | MF | 1993–1994 | 9 | 0 | 9 | 2 |
| Jimmy Williams | England | MF | 1908–1911 | 9 | 0 | 9 | 0 |
| Ian Wright | England | DF | 1990–1993 | 8 | 1 | 9 | 0 |
| Mark Duffy | England | MF | 2019–2020 | 2 | 7 | 9 | 0 |
| Julien Ngoy | Belgium | FW | 2016–2020 | 0 | 9 | 9 | 0 |
| Aden Flint | England | DF | 2022–2023 | 9 | 0 | 9 | 0 |
| Alan Biley | England | FW | 1981–1982 | 8 | 0 | 8 | 1 |
| David Boxley | England | FW | 1919–1920 | 8 | 0 | 8 | 4 |
| Garry Brooke | England | MF | 1989–1990 | 6 | 2 | 8 | 0 |
| George Brown | England | FW | 1904–1905 | 8 | 0 | 8 | 0 |
| Matthew Bullock | England | MF | 1997–2001 | 4 | 4 | 8 | 0 |
| Wilf Chadwick | England | FW | 1929–1930 | 8 | 0 | 8 | 2 |
| Einar Daníelsson | Iceland | MF | 1999–2000 | 8 | 0 | 8 | 1 |
| Des Farrow | England | HB | 1952–1954 | 8 | 0 | 8 | 0 |
| Reg Forester | England | FW | 1912–1919 | 8 | 0 | 8 | 0 |
| Sigursteinn Gislason | Iceland | MF | 1999–2000 | 8 | 0 | 8 | 0 |
| Eric Hampson | England | FB | 1948–1952 | 8 | 0 | 8 | 0 |
| Mark Harrison | England | GK | 1982–1983 | 8 | 0 | 8 | 0 |
| Jason Kavanagh | England | DF | 1999–2000 | 8 | 0 | 8 | 0 |
| George Latham | Wales | HB | 1910–1911 | 8 | 0 | 8 | 0 |
| Hugh McMahon | Scotland | DF | 1931–1932 | 8 | 0 | 8 | 0 |
| Tim Maloney | England | MF | 1930–1931 | 8 | 0 | 8 | 1 |
| Anthony Pulis | Wales | MF | 2004–2008 | 2 | 4 | 8 | 0 |
| Alex Raisbeck | Scotland | DF | 1897–1898 | 8 | 0 | 8 | 1 |
| Jack Robinson | England | MF | 1910–1911 | 8 | 0 | 8 | 0 |
| Fred Sheldon | England | GK | 1896–1897 | 8 | 0 | 8 | 0 |
| Harry Simpson | England | DF | 1896–1897 | 8 | 0 | 8 | 0 |
| Isaiah Turner | England | GK | 1906–1907 | 8 | 0 | 8 | 0 |
| Jimmy Wallace | England | MF | 1955–1960 | 8 | 0 | 8 | 1 |
| Bill Williamson | England | MF | 1906–1908 | 8 | 0 | 8 | 0 |
| Brian Wilson | England | MF | 2001–2004 | 3 | 5 | 8 | 0 |
| Lasse Sørensen | Denmark | MF | 2018–2021 | 3 | 5 | 8 | 0 |
| Christian Norton | Wales | FW | 2021–2022 | 3 | 5 | 8 | 0 |
| Bersant Celina | Kosovo | MF | 2023–2023 | 4 | 4 | 8 | 0 |
| Matija Sarkic | Montenegro | GK | 2023–2023 | 8 | 0 | 8 | 0 |
| Tom Baddeley | England | GK | 1909–1910 | 7 | 0 | 7 | 0 |
| Patrik Berger | Czech Republic | MF | 2006–2007 | 1 | 6 | 7 | 0 |
| Phil Bonnyman | Scotland | MF | 1985–1986 | 7 | 0 | 7 | 0 |
| Lucien Boullemier | England | HB | 1896–1897 | 7 | 0 | 7 | 0 |
| Arthur Bridgett | England | FW | 1902–1903 | 7 | 0 | 7 | 0 |
| Joe Buller | England | HB | 1932–1934 | 7 | 0 | 7 | 0 |
| Neville Chamberlain | England | FW | 1982–1984 | 7 | 0 | 7 | 0 |
| Gareth Evans | England | FW | 1990–1991 | 7 | 0 | 7 | 0 |
| Graham Fenton | England | MF | 2000–2001 | 4 | 3 | 7 | 1 |
| Arthur Foster | England | FB | 1891–1892 | 7 | 0 | 7 | 0 |
| Edwin Griffiths | England | FW | 1908–1909 | 7 | 0 | 7 | 0 |
| Dave Hockaday | England | DF | 1992–1993 | 7 | 0 | 7 | 0 |
| Gerry Jones | England | FW | 1963–1967 | 7 | 0 | 7 | 0 |
| Roy Jones | England | DF | 1947–1950 | 7 | 0 | 7 | 0 |
| Eric Lowell | England | FW | 1955–1956 | 7 | 0 | 7 | 3 |
| Peter McArdle | England | FW | 1934–1935 | 7 | 0 | 7 | 1 |
| Mark McNally | Scotland | DF | 1997–1998 | 7 | 0 | 7 | 0 |
| Edgar Montford | Wales | MF | 1888–1890 | 7 | 0 | 7 | 0 |
| George Paterson | Scotland | FW | 1925–1926 | 7 | 0 | 7 | 4 |
| Hughie Phillips | Scotland | DF | 1890–1891 | 7 | 0 | 7 | 0 |
| David Puckett | England | FW | 1987–1988 | 7 | 0 | 7 | 0 |
| Robbie Savage | England | MF | 1983–1984 | 5 | 2 | 7 | 0 |
| Tony Scully | Republic of Ireland | MF | 1997–1998 | 7 | 0 | 7 | 0 |
| Tim Steele | England | MF | 1992–1993 | 7 | 0 | 7 | 0 |
| Jakob Haugaard | Denmark | GK | 2016–2019 | 6 | 1 | 7 | 0 |
| Josh Wilson-Esbrand | England | DF | 2025–2025 | 5 | 2 | 7 | 0 |
| Sam Aiston | England | MF | 1999–2000 | 2 | 4 | 6 | 0 |
| Shola Ameobi | England | FW | 2007–2008 | 3 | 3 | 6 | 0 |
| Diego Arismendi | Uruguay | MF | 2009–2012 | 4 | 2 | 6 | 0 |
| George Bateman | England | FB | 1890–1892 | 6 | 0 | 6 | 0 |
| Jack Baxter | England | GK | 1910–1911 | 6 | 0 | 6 | 0 |
| Jack Forrest | Scotland | FW | 1902–1903 | 6 | 0 | 6 | 3 |
| Patrick Gallacher | Scotland | FW | 1938–1939 | 6 | 0 | 6 | 1 |
| Howard Gayle | England | FW | 1988–1987 | 6 | 0 | 6 | 2 |
| John Guidetti | Sweden | FW | 2013–2014 | 0 | 6 | 6 | 0 |
| Jack Haworth | England | FW | 1903–1904 | 6 | 0 | 6 | 2 |
| Stephen Kelly | Republic of Ireland | DF | 2008–2009 | 2 | 4 | 6 | 0 |
| Peter Kopteff | Finland | MF | 2005–2006 | 6 | 0 | 6 | 0 |
| John Lumsden | Scotland | FW | 1979–1982 | 6 | 0 | 6 | 0 |
| Wally Owen | England | FW | 1886–1887 | 6 | 0 | 6 | 4 |
| David Parkes | England | DF | 1920–1921 | 6 | 0 | 6 | 0 |
| Arthur Usherwood | England | FW | 1904–1905 | 6 | 0 | 6 | 1 |
| Douglas Westland | Scotland | GK | 1936–1938 | 6 | 0 | 6 | 0 |
| Mark Williams | Northern Ireland | DF | 2002–2003 | 6 | 0 | 6 | 0 |
| Demeaco Duhaney | England | DF | 2021–2022 | 6 | 0 | 6 | 0 |
| Liam Moore | Jamaica | DF | 2021–2022 | 6 | 0 | 6 | 0 |
| Jaden Dixon | England | DF | 2024–2026 | 4 | 2 | 6 | 0 |
| Jamie Donley | Northern Ireland | MF | 2025–2026 | 3 | 3 | 6 | 0 |
| Gavin Bazunu | Republic of Ireland | GK | 2026–2026 | 6 | 0 | 6 | 0 |
| Jason Beckford | England | FW | 1994–1995 | 3 | 2 | 5 | 1 |
| Frank Bentley | England | MF | 1907–1908 | 5 | 0 | 5 | 1 |
| Arthur Bentley | England | FW | 1896–1897 | 5 | 0 | 5 | 0 |
| Albert Bullock | England | FW | 1908–1910 | 5 | 0 | 5 | 1 |
| Joseph Depledge | England | DF | 1924–1925 | 5 | 0 | 5 | 0 |
| Tony Dinning | England | MF | 2001–2002 | 5 | 0 | 5 | 0 |
| Louie Donowa | England | MF | 1985–1986 | 4 | 1 | 5 | 1 |
| Sean Flynn | England | DF | 1997–1998 | 5 | 0 | 5 | 0 |
| Eidur Gudjohnsen | Iceland | FW | 2010–2011 | 0 | 5 | 5 | 0 |
| Bob Hamnett | England | HB | 1913–1914 | 5 | 0 | 5 | 2 |
| William Harding | England | HB | 1908–1909 | 5 | 0 | 5 | 0 |
| Crop Hawkins | England | HB | 1909–1910 | 5 | 0 | 5 | 0 |
| Tom Hill | England | FW | 1897–1898 | 5 | 0 | 5 | 2 |
| Reginald Hodgkins | England | DF | 1925–1926 | 5 | 0 | 5 | 0 |
| Alfred Jones | England | FW | 1924–1925 | 5 | 0 | 5 | 1 |
| Tony Lacey | England | DF | 1968–1969 | 3 | 2 | 5 | 0 |
| Fred Latham | England | GK | 1895–1896 | 5 | 0 | 5 | 0 |
| Steve Melton | England | MF | 1999–2000 | 5 | 0 | 5 | 0 |
| Wilf Merritt | England | GK | 1889–1891 | 5 | 0 | 5 | 0 |
| Gareth Owen | Wales | DF | 2001–2005 | 1 | 4 | 5 | 0 |
| Jack Ponsonby | Ireland | HB | 1897–1898 | 5 | 0 | 5 | 0 |
| Stuart Roberts | Wales | GK | 1984–1985 | 5 | 0 | 5 | 0 |
| Simon Rodger | England | DF | 1996–1997 | 5 | 0 | 5 | 0 |
| Brek Shea | United States | MF | 2013–2014 | 1 | 4 | 5 | 0 |
| Andy Smith | England | FW | 1923–1924 | 5 | 0 | 5 | 0 |
| Greg Strong | England | DF | 1998–1999 | 5 | 0 | 5 | 0 |
| George Tooth | England | FW | 1898–1899 | 5 | 0 | 5 | 1 |
| Paddy Turley | Ireland | DF | 1928–1930 | 5 | 0 | 5 | 0 |
| Tommy Ward | England | FW | 1938–1939 | 5 | 0 | 5 | 4 |
| Paul Warhurst | England | FW | 2002–2003 | 5 | 0 | 5 | 1 |
| Frank Watkin | England | FW | 1926–1927 | 5 | 0 | 5 | 3 |
| Billy Whitehurst | England | FW | 1990–1991 | 5 | 0 | 5 | 0 |
| Kostas Stafylidis | Greece | DF | 2017–2018 | 4 | 1 | 5 | 0 |
| Axel Tuanzebe | England | DF | 2023–2023 | 4 | 1 | 5 | 0 |
| Favour Fawunmi | England | MF | 2025– | 2 | 3 | 5 | 0 |
| Sydney Agina | Kenya | DF | 2026– | 3 | 2 | 5 | 0 |
| Svante Ingelsson | Sweden | MF | 2026– | 2 | 3 | 5 | 0 |
| Chris Barker | England | DF | 2004–2005 | 4 | 0 | 4 | 0 |
| Albert Boardman | England | GK | 1894–1895 | 4 | 0 | 4 | 0 |
| Jay Bothroyd | England | MF | 2007–2008 | 1 | 3 | 4 | 0 |
| John Bowman | England | DF | 1899–1900 | 4 | 0 | 4 | 0 |
| Ian Brightwell | England | DF | 2001–2002 | 3 | 1 | 4 | 0 |
| Horace Brindley | England | MF | 1904–1905 | 4 | 0 | 4 | 0 |
| Horace Brown | England | HB | 1883–1886 | 4 | 0 | 4 | 0 |
| Henri Camara | Senegal | FW | 2008–2009 | 0 | 4 | 4 | 0 |
| John Clowes | England | FW | 1950–1956 | 4 | 0 | 4 | 2 |
| Lee Collins | England | DF | 1999–2000 | 4 | 0 | 4 | 0 |
| Harold Connor | England | FW | 1952–1954 | 4 | 0 | 4 | 2 |
| Jody Craddock | England | DF | 2007–2008 | 4 | 0 | 4 | 0 |
| Jimmy Dale | Scotland | HB | 1894–1895 | 4 | 0 | 4 | 0 |
| Andrew Davies | England | DF | 2008–2012 | 1 | 3 | 4 | 0 |
| Syd Fursland | Wales | FW | 1935–1938 | 4 | 0 | 4 | 1 |
| Bill Fearns | Scotland | HB | 1896–1897 | 4 | 0 | 4 | 0 |
| Tommy Flannigan | Scotland | FW | 1928–1929 | 4 | 0 | 4 | 0 |
| Arthur Griffiths | Wales | FW | 1938–1939 | 4 | 0 | 4 | 0 |
| Bruce Grobbelaar | Zimbabwe | GK | 1992–1993 | 4 | 0 | 4 | 0 |
| Steve Guppy | England | MF | 2004–2005 | 4 | 0 | 4 | 0 |
| Jack Helme | England | FW | 1920–1921 | 4 | 0 | 4 | 1 |
| Will Holford | England | HB | 1886–1888 | 4 | 0 | 4 | 0 |
| John Jackson | England | HB | 1946–1947 | 4 | 0 | 4 | 3 |
| Jack McClelland | England | FW | 1952–1953 | 4 | 0 | 4 | 0 |
| John McDaid | Ireland | FW | 1930–1931 | 4 | 0 | 4 | 0 |
| Jimmy McGeachan | Scotland | HB | 1896–1897 | 4 | 0 | 4 | 0 |
| Eric McManus | Northern Ireland | GK | 1979–1982 | 4 | 0 | 4 | 0 |
| Bill Moore | England | HB | 1936–1938 | 4 | 0 | 4 | 0 |
| Herbert Myatt | England | FW | 1908–1909 | 4 | 0 | 4 | 0 |
| Jermaine Palmer | England | FW | 2004–2005 | 0 | 4 | 4 | 0 |
| Stephen Pearson | Scotland | MF | 2007–2008 | 3 | 1 | 4 | 0 |
| Demar Phillips | Jamaica | MF | 2007–2009 | 0 | 4 | 4 | 0 |
| Kevin Pressman | England | GK | 1992–1993 | 4 | 0 | 4 | 0 |
| Edward Rayner | England | MF | 1956–1960 | 4 | 0 | 4 | 0 |
| Paul Rennie | England | DF | 1990–1992 | 4 | 0 | 4 | 0 |
| Ken Scattergood | England | GK | 1934–1935 | 4 | 0 | 4 | 0 |
| Jack Shaffery | England | MF | 1897–1898 | 4 | 0 | 4 | 0 |
| Terry Smith | England | FW | 1970–1973 | 4 | 0 | 4 | 1 |
| Frank Staton | England | FW | 1888–1889 | 4 | 0 | 4 | 2 |
| Dennis Tueart | England | MF | 1983–1984 | 3 | 1 | 4 | 0 |
| Harold Watson | England | DF | 1926–1929 | 4 | 0 | 4 | 0 |
| Tommy Weston | England | DF | 1922–1923 | 4 | 0 | 4 | 0 |
| Jeff Whitley | Northern Ireland | MF | 2006–2007 | 1 | 3 | 4 | 0 |
| Harvey Whittaker | England | FW | 1899–1900 | 4 | 0 | 4 | 0 |
| John Williams | England | FW | 1994–1995 | 4 | 0 | 4 | 0 |
| John Worsdale | England | MF | 1968–1969 | 4 | 0 | 4 | 0 |
| Abdallah Sima | Senegal | FW | 2021–2022 | 1 | 3 | 4 | 0 |
| Will Forrester | England | DF | 2021–2022 | 4 | 0 | 4 | 1 |
| Tom Sparrow | Wales | MF | 2022–2024 | 4 | 0 | 4 | 0 |
| Gavin Kilkenny | Republic of Ireland | MF | 2022–2023 | 2 | 2 | 4 | 0 |
| Chiquinho | Portugal | MF | 2023–2023 | 2 | 2 | 4 | 0 |
| John Almond | England | FW | 1934–1935 | 3 | 0 | 3 | 1 |
| Charlie Axcell | England | FW | 1906–1907 | 3 | 0 | 3 | 0 |
| Billy Baird | Scotland | FW | 1896–1897 | 3 | 0 | 3 | 0 |
| Bob Barr | Scotland | FW | 1888–1889 | 3 | 0 | 3 | 0 |
| Teddy Bennett | England | FW | 1883–1886 | 3 | 0 | 3 | 4 |
| Percy Birch | England | GK | 1883–1886 | 3 | 0 | 3 | 0 |
| Billy Burns | England | FW | 1930–1931 | 3 | 0 | 3 | 1 |
| Chris Clark | England | DF | 2004–2005 | 1 | 2 | 3 | 0 |
| Ephraim Colclough | England | FW | 1898–1899 | 3 | 0 | 3 | 0 |
| Paul Crooks | England | FW | 1986–1987 | 0 | 3 | 3 | 0 |
| Alan Curtis | Wales | FW | 1985–1986 | 3 | 0 | 3 | 0 |
| Harry Dowd | England | GK | 1969–1970 | 3 | 0 | 3 | 0 |
| Francis Eardley | England | FW | 1908–1909 | 3 | 0 | 3 | 2 |
| Albert Ellis | England | FW | 1913–1914 | 3 | 0 | 3 | 0 |
| Albert Farmer | England | HB | 1888–1890 | 3 | 0 | 3 | 0 |
| Arthur Fielding | England | FW | 1908–1909 | 3 | 0 | 3 | 0 |
| Billy Fraser | Scotland | MF | 1891–1892 | 3 | 0 | 3 | 0 |
| Wilf Haines | England | MF | 1904–1905 | 3 | 0 | 3 | 1 |
| Dick Hawe | England | HB | 1908–1911 | 3 | 0 | 3 | 0 |
| Jason Jarrett | England | MF | 2004–2005 | 3 | 0 | 3 | 0 |
| George Lennon | Scotland | DF | 1922–1923 | 3 | 0 | 3 | 0 |
| Jack Lewis | Wales | HB | 1933–1934 | 3 | 0 | 3 | 0 |
| Paul Macari | Scotland | FW | 1993–1998 | 3 | 0 | 3 | 0 |
| Tosh McKinlay | Scotland | DF | 1997–1997 | 3 | 0 | 3 | 0 |
| Louis Moult | England | FW | 2009–2012 | 0 | 3 | 3 | 0 |
| Dan Noble | England | GK | 1989–1990 | 3 | 0 | 3 | 0 |
| Jimmy Owen | England | FW | 1888–1890 | 3 | 0 | 3 | 2 |
| Tony Parks | England | GK | 1992–1993 | 3 | 0 | 3 | 0 |
| John Paxton | England | FW | 1911–1912 | 3 | 0 | 3 | 1 |
| Edward Proctor | England | FW | 1895–1896 | 3 | 0 | 3 | 2 |
| Marvin Robinson | England | FW | 2000–2001 | 3 | 0 | 3 | 1 |
| George Roche | England | MF | 1912–1913 | 3 | 0 | 3 | 0 |
| Henry Salmon | England | DF | 1931–1932 | 3 | 0 | 3 | 1 |
| Paul Shardlow | England | GK | 1966–1968 | 3 | 0 | 3 | 0 |
| Victor Shore | England | FW | 1921–1922 | 3 | 0 | 3 | 0 |
| Herbert Smith | England | HB | 1902–1903 | 3 | 0 | 3 | 0 |
| Jörg Sobiech | Germany | MF | 1997–1998 | 3 | 0 | 3 | 0 |
| Jesse Stanley | England | FB | 1891–1892 | 3 | 0 | 3 | 0 |
| Fred Steel | England | FW | 1909–1910 | 3 | 0 | 3 | 0 |
| Edwin Steventon | England | GK | 1920–1921 | 3 | 0 | 3 | 0 |
| James Swarbrick | England | MF | 1910–1911 | 3 | 0 | 3 | 0 |
| John Tunnicliffe | England | HB | 1891–1892 | 3 | 0 | 3 | 0 |
| Bob White | England | FW | 1923–1924 | 3 | 0 | 3 | 0 |
| Fred Wilkinson | England | FW | 1921–1922 | 3 | 0 | 3 | 0 |
| Mark Wilson | England | MF | 2002–2003 | 3 | 0 | 3 | 0 |
| Ciaran Clark | Republic of Ireland | DF | 2023–2024 | 3 | 0 | 3 | 0 |
| Will Smith | England | MF | 2024–2026 | 0 | 3 | 3 | 0 |
| Raphael-Pijus Otegbayo | Republic of Ireland | DF | 2026– | 2 | 1 | 3 | 0 |
| Desmond Backos | South Africa | FW | 1977–1978 | 1 | 1 | 2 | 0 |
| Paul Baines | England | FW | 1990–1991 | 1 | 1 | 2 | 0 |
| Fred Basnett | England | FW | 1946–1947 | 2 | 0 | 2 | 0 |
| Fred Bettany | England | HB | 1885–1886 | 2 | 0 | 2 | 0 |
| Sid Blackie | England | FW | 1924–1925 | 2 | 0 | 2 | 0 |
| John Brooks | England | MF | 1950–1951 | 2 | 0 | 2 | 0 |
| Richard Burton | England | DF | 1913–1914 | 2 | 0 | 2 | 0 |
| Bill Charnley | England | HB | 1919–1920 | 2 | 0 | 2 | 0 |
| Don Clegg | England | GK | 1950–1951 | 2 | 0 | 2 | 0 |
| Joe Copestake | England | FB | 1884–1885 | 2 | 0 | 2 | 0 |
| Hugo Costa | Portugal | DF | 1995–1996 | 2 | 0 | 2 | 0 |
| Harry Cotton | England | GK | 1908–1909 | 2 | 0 | 2 | 0 |
| John Cotton | England | DF | 1953–1954 | 2 | 0 | 2 | 0 |
| George Daniels | England | DF | 1933–1934 | 2 | 0 | 2 | 0 |
| Sammy Davies | England | DF | 1923–1924 | 2 | 0 | 2 | 0 |
| Jack Deakin | England | DF | 1898–1899 | 2 | 0 | 2 | 0 |
| O'Neill Donaldson | England | FW | 1997–1998 | 2 | 0 | 2 | 0 |
| Billy Draycott | England | MF | 1892–1894 | 2 | 0 | 2 | 0 |
| Steve Ford | England | FW | 1981–1982 | 1 | 1 | 2 | 0 |
| Stephen Farrell | Scotland | MF | 1989–1990 | 0 | 2 | 2 | 0 |
| Robert Garrett | Northern Ireland | MF | 2006–2007 | 0 | 2 | 2 | 0 |
| Bill Godley | England | FW | 1903–1904 | 2 | 0 | 2 | 0 |
| Harry Gregg | Northern Ireland | GK | 1966–1967 | 2 | 0 | 2 | 0 |
| Thordur Gudjonsson | Iceland | MF | 2004–2005 | 2 | 0 | 2 | 0 |
| James Harbot | England | FB | 1936–1937 | 2 | 0 | 2 | 0 |
| Dick Hope | Scotland | FW | 1914–1915 | 2 | 0 | 2 | 0 |
| Brian Horne | England | GK | 1992–1993 | 2 | 0 | 2 | 0 |
| Freddie Houldsworth | England | GK | 1934–1935 | 2 | 0 | 2 | 0 |
| Russell Hoult | England | GK | 2007–2008 | 2 | 0 | 2 | 0 |
| Alfred Jordan | Ireland | DF | 1922–1923 | 2 | 0 | 2 | 0 |
| Bob Hulse | England | MF | 1967–1968 | 2 | 0 | 2 | 0 |
| Steve Lennox | Scotland | MF | 1982–1983 | 1 | 1 | 2 | 0 |
| Steve Leslie | Scotland | MF | 1995–1996 | 0 | 2 | 2 | 0 |
| Fred Lewis | England | HB | 1909–1910 | 2 | 0 | 2 | 0 |
| Ted McDonald | Scotland | HB | 1896–1897 | 2 | 0 | 2 | 0 |
| Harry Montford | Wales | MF | 1888–1889 | 2 | 0 | 2 | 0 |
| Bill Nixon | England | FW | 1910–1911 | 2 | 0 | 2 | 0 |
| George Oldham | England | DF | 1938–1939 | 2 | 0 | 2 | 0 |
| Souleymane Oulare | Guinea | FW | 2001–2002 | 1 | 1 | 2 | 1 |
| William Owen | England | DF | 1909–1910 | 2 | 0 | 2 | 0 |
| Edgar Powell | Wales | FW | 1924–1925 | 2 | 0 | 2 | 0 |
| Tommy Randles | England | FW | 1961–1962 | 2 | 0 | 2 | 0 |
| Paul Reece | England | GK | 1986–1987 | 2 | 0 | 2 | 0 |
| Arthur Roberts | England | MF | 1899–1900 | 2 | 0 | 2 | 0 |
| Mark Sale | England | FW | 1990–1991 | 0 | 2 | 2 | 0 |
| Dick Schreuder | Netherlands | MF | 1997–1998 | 2 | 0 | 2 | 0 |
| Ollie Shenton | England | MF | 2014–2020 | 0 | 2 | 2 | 0 |
| George Slater | England | MF | 1888–1889 | 2 | 0 | 2 | 1 |
| Allan Smart | Scotland | FW | 2001–2002 | 2 | 0 | 2 | 0 |
| Mark Smith | Scotland | FW | 1989–1990 | 2 | 0 | 2 | 0 |
| Graham Stokoe | England | MF | 1995–1997 | 2 | 0 | 2 | 0 |
| Billy Tompkinson | England | FW | 1915–1919 | 2 | 0 | 2 | 0 |
| Josuah Turner | England | DF | 1909–1910 | 2 | 0 | 2 | 0 |
| Fred Wain | England | GK | 1908–1909 | 2 | 0 | 2 | 0 |
| Tommy Walker | England | MF | 1971–1972 | 2 | 0 | 2 | 0 |
| John Whitehouse | England | HB | 1906–1907 | 2 | 0 | 2 | 0 |
| Brett Williams | England | DF | 1993–1994 | 2 | 0 | 2 | 0 |
| Ashley Wooliscroft | England | DF | 1999–2000 | 1 | 1 | 2 | 0 |
| Dionatan Teixeira | Slovakia | DF | 2015–2017 | 0 | 2 | 2 | 0 |
| Adam Porter | England | DF | 2021–2022 | 2 | 0 | 2 | 0 |
| Nikola Jojić | Serbia | MF | 2023–2026 | 0 | 2 | 2 | 0 |
| Jaden Mears | England | DF | 2025– | 2 | 0 | 2 | 0 |
| Freddie Anderson | United States | DF | 2024– | 1 | 1 | 2 | 1 |
| Tommy Arthern | England | FW | 1891–1892 | 1 | 0 | 1 | 0 |
| Horace Bailey | England | GK | 1910–1911 | 1 | 0 | 1 | 0 |
| Bill Barker | England | FW | 1949–1950 | 1 | 0 | 1 | 0 |
| Paul Barron | England | GK | 1984–1985 | 1 | 0 | 1 | 0 |
| Junior Bent | England | FW | 1991–1992 | 1 | 0 | 1 | 0 |
| George Boote | England | GK | 1901–1902 | 1 | 0 | 1 | 0 |
| Albert Bourne | England | FB | 1888–1889 | 1 | 0 | 1 | 0 |
| David Bright | England | FW | 1990–1991 | 0 | 1 | 1 | 0 |
| David Brightwell | England | DF | 1995–1996 | 1 | 0 | 1 | 0 |
| Joe Broadhurst | England | FW | 1887–1888 | 1 | 0 | 1 | 0 |
| Arthur Broomhall | England | GK | 1886–1887 | 1 | 0 | 1 | 0 |
| Joe Brough | England | MF | 1907–1908 | 1 | 0 | 1 | 0 |
| Richard Chadwick | England | HB | 1886–1887 | 1 | 0 | 1 | 0 |
| Richard Coates | England | FW | 1912–1913 | 1 | 0 | 1 | 0 |
| Stuart Cowden | England | HB | 1945–1946 | 1 | 0 | 1 | 0 |
| Walter Cox | England | U | 1883–1884 | 1 | 0 | 1 | 0 |
| Harry Davies | England | FW | 1913–1914 | 1 | 0 | 1 | 0 |
| Alfred Dempsey | England | FW | 1888–1889 | 1 | 0 | 1 | 0 |
| George Dickie | Scotland | FW | 1925–1926 | 1 | 0 | 1 | 0 |
| Maurice Edu | United States | MF | 2012–2015 | 0 | 1 | 1 | 0 |
| George Farmer | England | HB | 1886–1887 | 1 | 0 | 1 | 0 |
| Billy Forrester | England | FW | 1891–1892 | 1 | 0 | 1 | 0 |
| Tom Forrester | England | FW | 1888–1889 | 1 | 0 | 1 | 0 |
| Emmanuel Foster | England | GK | 1946–1947 | 1 | 0 | 1 | 0 |
| Stuart Fraser | England | GK | 1998–1999 | 1 | 0 | 1 | 0 |
| Ian Gibbons | England | FW | 1987–1988 | 0 | 1 | 1 | 0 |
| Edmund Giblin | England | MF | 1946–1947 | 1 | 0 | 1 | 0 |
| Bert Hales | England | MF | 1930–1931 | 1 | 0 | 1 | 0 |
| Laurence Hall | England | FW | 2001–2004 | 0 | 1 | 1 | 0 |
| Victor Hall | England | MF | 1910–1911 | 1 | 0 | 1 | 0 |
| Charlie Hassall | England | GK | 1888–1889 | 1 | 0 | 1 | 0 |
| Matthew Hazley | Northern Ireland | MF | 2005–2006 | 0 | 1 | 1 | 0 |
| Charlie Hinks | England | FW | 1903–1904 | 1 | 0 | 1 | 0 |
| Francis Hobson | England | HB | 1910–1911 | 1 | 0 | 1 | 0 |
| Harry Holt | Wales | DF | 1910–1911 | 1 | 0 | 1 | 0 |
| John Howshall | England | DF | 1933–1934 | 1 | 0 | 1 | 0 |
| Sam Howshall | England | MF | 1908–1909 | 1 | 0 | 1 | 0 |
| Dennis Hughes | England | MF | 1950–1951 | 1 | 0 | 1 | 0 |
| Billy Hutchinson | England | MF | 1888–1889 | 1 | 0 | 1 | 0 |
| Edward Johnson | England | FW | 1883–1884 | 1 | 0 | 1 | 0 |
| David Jones | Wales | GK | 1938–1939 | 1 | 0 | 1 | 0 |
| John Kirkby | United States | MF | 1948–1949 | 1 | 0 | 1 | 0 |
| George Lawton | England | GK | 1901–1902 | 1 | 0 | 1 | 0 |
| Kevin Lewis | England | DF | 1987–1988 | 0 | 1 | 1 | 0 |
| Bob Lister | Scotland | FW | 1927–1928 | 1 | 0 | 1 | 0 |
| William Locker | England | FW | 1888–1889 | 1 | 0 | 1 | 0 |
| Danny McLaren | Scotland | FW | 1892–1893 | 1 | 0 | 1 | 0 |
| Arden Maddison | England | HB | 1923–1924 | 1 | 0 | 1 | 0 |
| Chris Male | England | MF | 1990–1991 | 0 | 1 | 1 | 0 |
| Wilf Mayer | England | FW | 1934–1935 | 1 | 0 | 1 | 0 |
| Stan Meakin | England | HB | 1887–1888 | 1 | 0 | 1 | 0 |
| Jimmy Mellor | England | DF | 1895–1896 | 1 | 0 | 1 | 0 |
| M. Mellor | England | DF | 1883–1884 | 1 | 0 | 1 | 0 |
| John Miles | England | MF | 2001–2002 | 0 | 1 | 1 | 0 |
| Doug Millward | England | FW | 1887–1888 | 1 | 0 | 1 | 0 |
| Albert Moore | England | FW | 1921–1922 | 1 | 0 | 1 | 0 |
| Thomas Moore | Scotland | FW | 1888–1889 | 1 | 0 | 1 | 0 |
| Jamie Ness | Scotland | MF | 2012–2015 | 0 | 1 | 1 | 0 |
| Jim Peacock | England | DF | 1896–1897 | 1 | 0 | 1 | 0 |
| Mel Pejic | England | DF | 1979–1980 | 1 | 0 | 1 | 0 |
| Reginald Pickup | England | FW | 1949–1950 | 1 | 0 | 1 | 0 |
| Ben Prosser | England | FW | 1902–1903 | 1 | 0 | 1 | 0 |
| Harold Robson | England | FW | 1924–1926 | 1 | 0 | 1 | 0 |
| Walter Rogers | England | HB | 1907–1908 | 1 | 0 | 1 | 0 |
| Walter Rowlands | England | MF | 1913–1914 | 1 | 0 | 1 | 0 |
| Herbert Salt | England | GK | 1902–1903 | 1 | 0 | 1 | 0 |
| Hans Segers | Netherlands | GK | 1987–1988 | 1 | 0 | 1 | 0 |
| Brian Sherratt | England | GK | 1961–1962 | 1 | 0 | 1 | 0 |
| Bill Smalley | England | FW | 1888–1889 | 1 | 0 | 1 | 0 |
| Bobby Smith | England | FW | 1891–1892 | 1 | 0 | 1 | 0 |
| Harry Smith | England | HB | 1906–1907 | 1 | 0 | 1 | 0 |
| Sam Spencer | England | FW | 1921–1922 | 1 | 0 | 1 | 0 |
| Archie Sproson | England | FW | 1912–1913 | 1 | 0 | 1 | 0 |
| Tom Stanford | England | DF | 1883–1884 | 1 | 0 | 1 | 0 |
| Ernie Tapai | Australia | MF | 1992–1993 | 1 | 0 | 1 | 0 |
| Charlie Twemlow | England | FW | 1921–1922 | 1 | 0 | 1 | 1 |
| Horace Viner | Wales | GK | 1908–1909 | 1 | 0 | 1 | 0 |
| Shaun Wade | England | FW | 1994–1995 | 1 | 0 | 1 | 0 |
| Tom Wainwright | England | FW | 1888–1889 | 1 | 0 | 1 | 0 |
| Bertram Wallace | England | FW | 1901–1902 | 1 | 0 | 1 | 0 |
| Ted Wilson | England | DF | 1883–1884 | 1 | 0 | 1 | 0 |
| Arthur Woodall | England | FW | 1953–1954 | 1 | 0 | 1 | 0 |
| Samuel Woods | Scotland | FW | 1896–1897 | 1 | 0 | 1 | 0 |
| Harry Wootton | England | DF | 1919–1920 | 1 | 0 | 1 | 0 |
| Davide Xausa | Canada | FW | 1997–1998 | 1 | 0 | 1 | 0 |
| Jack Yates | England | FW | 1883–1884 | 1 | 0 | 1 | 0 |
| Andy Lonergan | England | GK | 2020–2021 | 1 | 0 | 1 | 0 |
| Lewis Macari | Scotland | DF | 2023–2023 | 0 | 1 | 1 | 0 |
| Liam McCarron | Scotland | MF | 2022–2024 | 0 | 1 | 1 | 0 |
| Darius Lipsiuc | Republic of Ireland | MF | 2024–2026 | 0 | 1 | 1 | 0 |
| Chinonso Chibueze | England | MF | 2025– | 1 | 0 | 1 | 0 |
| Frank Fielding | England | GK | 2021– | 1 | 0 | 1 | 0 |
| Laurence Giani | Italy | DF | 2026– | 1 | 0 | 1 | 0 |
| Josh Griffiths | England | GK | 2026– | 1 | 0 | 1 | 0 |
| Tyler Martin | England | FW | 2026– | 0 | 1 | 1 | 0 |

== Notes ==
- A utility player is one who is considered to play in more than one position.
