= Mygatt =

Mygatt is a surname. Notable people with the surname include:

- Robertson Kirtland Mygatt (1861–1919), American landscape painter and etcher
- Tracy Dickinson Mygatt (1885–1973), American writer and pacifist

== See also ==
- Myatt
- Mynatt
