= Howshall =

Howshall is a surname. Notable people with the surname include:

- John Howshall (1912–1962), English footballer
- Sam Howshall (1883 – after 1908), English footballer
