= Scattergood =

== People ==
Scattergood is a surname. Notable people with the surname include:

- Ernald Scattergood, English footballer
- Henry Scattergood, American cricketer
- Ken Scattergood, English footballer
- Polly Scattergood, British singer-songwriter

== See also ==
- Scattergood Friends School, in Cedar County, Iowa
