= Josuah =

Josuah is a masculine given name. Notable people with the name include:

- Josuah Sylvester (1563–1618), English poet
- Josuah Turner (1884–1960), English footballer

== See also ==
- Josiah (given name)
