= James Gorman =

James Gorman may refer to:

- James Gorman (VC) (1834–1882), English recipient of the Victoria Cross
- James S. Gorman (1850–1923), U.S. Representative from Michigan
- James Gorman (sport shooter) (1859–1929), American sport shooter
- James Gorman (politician) (1874–1950), English politician and trade unionist
- James Gorman (architect) (1876-1920), Scottish architect
- James Gorman (footballer, born in Dudley) (1882–?), English footballer (Stoke)
- James Gorman (footballer, born in Middlesbrough) (1882–1957), English footballer (Liverpool)
- James E. Gorman, president of the Chicago, Rock Island and Pacific Railroad, 1917–1933
- Jimmy Gorman (1910–1991), English footballer
- Lou Gorman (James Gerald Gorman, 1929–2011), American baseball executive
- James P. Gorman (born 1958), chairman and CEO, Morgan Stanley
