= Amyatt =

Amyatt is a surname. Notable people with the surname include:

- James Amyatt (1734–1813), British MP
- John Amyatt, English chemist

== See also ==
- Myatt
