= Peter McArdle (disambiguation) =

Peter McArdle (born 1965) is an English artist.

Peter McArdle may also refer to:

- Pete McArdle (1929–1985), Irish-American long-distance runner
- Peter McArdle (footballer) (1914–1979), English footballer
- Peter J. McArdle (1874–1940), Pittsburgh City Council member

== See also ==
- Peter McCardle (born 1955), New Zealand politician
