= Mynatt =

Mynatt is a surname. Notable people with the surname include:

- Elizabeth Mynatt (born 1966), American computer scientist
- Jerry Mynatt (born c. 1968), American football player and coach

== See also ==
- Myatt
- Mynett
