= Albert Pitt (footballer) =

English footballer

Personal information
- Full name: Albert Edward Pitt
- Date of birth: 1880
- Place of birth: Shardlow, England
- Positions: Half-back; forward

Senior career*
Years	Team	Apps	(Gls)
1902	Stone Town		
1903–1905	Stoke	7	(1)
1905	Birmingham University		
1906–1907	Canterbury Provinces		
1908–1911	Stoke	40	(4)
1910	Canadian Club		
1911	Trentham		
1911–1912	Wrexham		
1912	Stoke	4	(0)
1913	Norton Bridge		
Total		51	(5)
- * Club domestic league appearances and goals

Albert Edward Pitt (born 1880) was an English footballer who played in the Football League for Stoke.

== Career ==
Pitt started playing football with amateur side Stone Town before joining Stoke in 1903. He played a bit part role for Stoke and in 1905 he left to attend Birmingham University and then left for New Zealand. He returned to Stoke in 1908 and was a regular during the 1908–09 season before he then left the country again this time to Canada. He returned about a year later and played for Trentham, Wrexham and four more matches for Stoke.

== Career statistics ==
Club	Season	Division	League		FA Cup		Total	
Club	Season	Division	Apps	Goals	Apps	Goals	Apps	Goals
Stoke	1903–04	First Division	4	0	0	0	4	0
Stoke	1904–05	First Division	3	1	0	0	3	1
Stoke	1908–09	Birmingham & District League	31	4	1	0	32	4
Stoke	1909–10	Birmingham & District League / Southern League Division Two	1	0	0	0	1	0
Stoke	1910–11	Birmingham & District League / Southern League Division Two	8	0	0	0	8	0
Stoke	1912–13	Southern League Division One	4	0	0	0	4	0
Career Total			51	5	1	0	52	5
