= Jimmy Williams (footballer, born 1888) =

English footballer

Personal information
- Full name: James Williams
- Date of birth: 1888
- Place of birth: Stoke-upon-Trent, England
- Date of death: 1951 (aged 62–63)
- Place of death: Stoke-on-Trent, England
- Position: Midfielder

Senior career*
| Years | Team | Apps | (Gls) |
| 19??–1908 | Tunstall Swifts | | |
| 1908–1911 | Stoke | 8 | (0) |
| 1911–19?? | Hanley Swifts | | |
- * Club domestic league appearances and goals

James Williams (1888–1951) was an English footballer who played for Stoke City.

== Career ==
Williams was born in Stoke-upon-Trent, England, and played amateur football with Tunstall Swifts before joining English association football club Stoke City in 1908. He spent three seasons at the Victoria Ground, during which time he was used as a reserve player and made nine appearances. In 1911, Williams returned to amateur football with Hanley Swifts.

== Career statistics ==
Appearances and goals by club, season and competition
| Club | Season | League | | FA Cup | | Total | |
| Club | Season | Apps | Goals | Apps | Goals | Apps | Goals |
|---|---|---|---|---|---|---|---|
| Stoke | 1908–09 | 2 | 0 | 0 | 0 | 2 | 0 |
| Stoke | 1909–10 | 5 | 0 | 1 | 0 | 6 | 0 |
| Stoke | 1910–11 | 1 | 0 | 0 | 0 | 1 | 0 |
| Career total | | 8 | 0 | 1 | 0 | 9 | 0 |
