= Dick Hawe =

English footballer

Personal information
- Full name: Richard Hawe
- Date of birth: 1883
- Place of birth: Stoke-upon-Trent, England
- Date of death: 1961 (aged 78)
- Place of death: Stoke-on-Trent, England
- Position: Half-back

Senior career*
| Years | Team | Apps | (Gls) |
| 19??–1908 | Goldenhill United | | |
| 1908–1911 | Stoke | 3 | (0) |
| 1911–19?? | Goldenhill United | | |
- * Club domestic league appearances and goals

Richard Hawe (1883 – 1961) was an English footballer who played for Stoke.

== Career ==
Hawe was as born in Stoke-upon-Trent and played amateur football with Goldenhill United before joining Stoke in 1908. He continued to play with Goldenhill United and was used by Stoke as and when they needed him. He spent three seasons with Stoke and made a single appearance in each season.

== Career statistics ==
| Club | Season | League | | FA Cup | | Total | |
| Club | Season | Apps | Goals | Apps | Goals | Apps | Goals |
|---|---|---|---|---|---|---|---|
| Stoke | 1908–09 | 1 | 0 | 0 | 0 | 1 | 0 |
| Stoke | 1909–10 | 1 | 0 | 0 | 0 | 1 | 0 |
| Stoke | 1910–11 | 1 | 0 | 0 | 0 | 1 | 0 |
| Career Total | | 3 | 0 | 0 | 0 | 3 | 0 |
