= William Davies (footballer, born 1884) =

English footballer

Personal information
- Full name: William Davies
- Date of birth: 1884
- Place of birth: Longton, England
- Date of death: 1954 (aged 70)
- Position: Inside right

Senior career*
Years	Team	Apps	(Gls)
- Newcastle Rangers
1907–1909	Stoke	30	(16)
- * Club domestic league appearances and goals

William Davies (1884 – 1954) was an English footballer who played for Stoke.

== Career ==
Davies was born in Longton and played amateur football with Newcastle Rangers before joining Stoke in 1907. He scored twice in ten appearances in 1907–08 and then he scored 14 goals in 21 matches in 1908–09.

== Career statistics ==
Appearances and goals by club, season and competition
Club	Season	League			FA Cup		Total	
Club	Season	Division	Apps	Goals	Apps	Goals	Apps	Goals
Stoke	1907–08	Second Division	10	2	0	0	10	2
Stoke	1908–09	Birmingham & District League	20	14	1	0	21	14
Career total			30	16	1	0	31	16
