= Francis Eardley =

English footballer

Personal information
- Full name: Francis Eardley
- Date of birth: 1885
- Place of birth: Stoke-upon-Trent, England
- Date of death: 1954 (aged 68–69)
- Place of death: Stoke-on-Trent, England
- Position: Forward

Senior career*
Years	Team	Apps	(Gls)
- Hanley Town
1908–1909	Stoke	3	(2)
1910–1911	Port Vale	6	(2)
- * Club domestic league appearances and goals

Francis Eardley (1885–1954) was an English footballer who played for Port Vale and Stoke.

== Career ==
Eardley started his career with non-League amateur sides Hanley Town, Tunstall Park and Goldenhill Wanderers. He joined Stoke in 1908, scoring twice in three league games in 1908–09 before leaving the club the following year. Following this he signed with local side Port Vale, playing his first game for the club in a 3–0 defeat by Stoke Reserves at the Athletic Ground in a North Staffordshire & District League match on 8 October 1910. He scored four goals in eight games over all competitions before leaving the club at the end of the 1910–11 season.

== Career statistics ==
Appearances and goals by club, season and competition
Club	Season	League			FA Cup		Total	
Club	Season	Division	Apps	Goals	Apps	Goals	Apps	Goals
Stoke	1908–09	Birmingham & District League	3	2	0	0	3	2
Port Vale	1910–11	North Staffordshire & District League	6	2	0	0	6	2
