= 1908–09 Stoke F.C. season =

Stoke
1908–09 season
- Chairman: Mr Rev. A Hurst
- Manager: Alfred Barker
- Stadium: Victoria Ground
- Birmingham & District League: 8th (31 Points)
- FA Cup: First Round
- Top goalscorer: League: William Davies (14); All: William Davies (14)
- Highest home attendance: 12,000 vs Crewe Alexandra (23 January 1909)
- Lowest home attendance: 2,500 vs Halesowen (20 March 1909)
- Average home league attendance: 5,117
Home colours

The 1908–09 season was Stoke's first season in the Birmingham & District League.

With Stoke now out of the Football League they entered the Birmingham & District League for the 1908–09 season. With a new board, chairman, manager and squad, Stoke used the season as a rebuilding one and the crowds began to return to the Victoria Ground. Stoke finished in eighth place with 31 points.

== Season review ==
=== League ===
Stoke was now playing in the Birmingham & District League, which included the reserve teams of Aston Villa, Birmingham, West Brom and Wolves plus some other useful opposition. With Alfred Barker now the manager, the team itself was made up of a mixture of ex-professionals and amateurs. Those who remained with the club were William Davies, Ernest Mullineux, Fred Rathbone and Sam Baddeley. Barker used 32 players during the season, and eighth place was secured in the final league table.

Crowds were often good and there were turnouts of 7,000+ for a few league matches, which confirmed that the club still had its local support. Wins of 7–0 over Wellington Town 5–0 over Walsall and 5–3 over Villa's second string were among the best performances, while the nadir was an 8–1 defeat by West Brom reserves. Stoke's goalkeeper against Albion was Harry Cotton, who was sacked by Barker after the match.

=== FA Cup ===
Stoke made a poor exit in the first round, being well beaten 5–0 by The Wednesday.

== Final league table ==
Pos	Team	Pld	W	D	L	GF	GA	GAv	Pts
1	Aston Villa Reserves	34	24	6	4	118	36	3.278	54
2	Crewe Alexandra	34	24	4	6	99	42	2.357	52
3	Wolverhampton Wanderers Reserves	34	21	6	7	71	46	1.543	48
4	West Bromwich Albion Reserves	34	18	6	10	85	43	1.977	42
5	Brierley Hill Alliance	34	14	8	12	57	54	1.056	36
6	Shrewsbury Town	34	11	13	10	51	48	1.063	35
7	Kidderminster Harriers	34	13	6	15	58	85	0.682	32
8	Stoke	34	13	5	16	71	64	1.109	31
9	Worcester City	34	14	3	17	71	70	1.014	31
10	Stafford Rangers	34	11	9	14	51	63	0.810	31
11	Wrexham	34	14	3	17	60	76	0.789	31
12	Birmingham Reserves	34	11	7	16	53	73	0.726	29
13	Burton United	34	13	3	18	48	75	0.640	29
14	Stourbridge	34	9	10	15	49	57	0.860	28
15	Walsall	34	10	8	16	47	56	0.839	28
16	Wellington Town	34	11	5	18	60	86	0.698	27
17	Halesowen	34	11	4	19	42	83	0.506	26
18	Dudley Town	34	10	2	22	55	89	0.618	22

== Results ==
Stoke's score comes first.

=== Legend ===
Win	Draw	Loss

=== Birmingham & District League ===
Match	Date	Opponent	Venue	Result	Attendance	Scorers
1	5 September 1908	Aston Villa Reserves	H	5–3	12,000	Myatt (2), Owen (2), Davies
2	12 September 1908	Walsall	A	0–3	4,200	
3	14 September 1908	Stourbridge	A	2–2	2,000	Howshall (2)
4	19 September 1908	Crewe Alexandra	A	2–3	4,000	Davies, Pitt
5	19 September 1908	Burton United	H	0–1	4,000	
6	26 September 1908	Kidderminster Harriers	H	3–1	4,500	Greaves (2), Davies
7	3 October 1908	Brierley Hill Alliance	A	4–3	3,000	Greaves (2), Davies, Pitt
8	10 October 1908	Wellington Town	H	7–0	5,000	Millward (3), Horrocks (2), Pitt, Davies
9	17 October 1908	Worcester City	A	1–5	2,500	Davies
10	24 October 1908	Dudley Town	H	4–0	5,000	Davies, Greaves, Horrocks, Pitt
11	31 October 1908	West Bromwich Albion Reserves	A	1–8	5,000	Davies
12	7 November 1908	Birmingham Reserves	H	0–1	5,000	
13	14 November 1908	Halesowen	A	0–2	200	
14	28 November 1908	Shrewsbury Town	A	1–3	2,000	Gorman
15	5 December 1908	Stourbridge	H	2–0	5,000	McAllister, Cook
16	12 December 1908	Stafford Rangers	A	1–1	3,000	Davies (pen)
17	19 December 1908	Wolverhampton Wanderers Reserves	H	3–1	4,000	McAllister, Millward (2)
18	26 December 1908	Burton United	A	1–2	3,000	Davies
19	28 December 1908	Wrexham	H	4–2	6,000	Davies (2), Hargraves (2)
20	2 January 1909	Aston Villa Reserves	A	1–4	5,000	Hargraves
21	9 January 1909	Walsall	H	5–0	3,000	Hargraves, Davies (2), Horrocks, Millward
22	23 January 1909	Crewe Alexandra	H	3–4	12,000	Millward, Gorman (2)
23	30 January 1909	Kidderminster Harriers	A	2–3	2,500	Hargraves, Horrocks
24	6 February 1909	Brierley Hill Alliance	H	2–0	3,000	Millward, McAllister
25	13 February 1909	Wellington Town	A	1–1	2,000	Baddeley
26	20 February 1909	Worcester City	H	3–0	5,000	Millward, Hargraves, Gorman
27	27 February 1909	Dudley Town	A	2–2	1,500	Hargraves, Gorman
28	13 March 1909	Birmingham Reserves	A	1–0	3,000	Hargraves
29	20 March 1909	Halesowen	H	0–1	2,500	
30	27 March 1909	Wrexham	A	1–2	3,000	Eardley
31	3 April 1909	Shrewsbury Town	H	1–2	3,000	Bullock
32	17 April 1909	Stafford Rangers	H	3–3	4,000	Eardley, Hargraves, Gorman
33	19 April 1909	West Bromwich Albion Reserves	H	5–0	4,000	Hargraves (2), Gorman, Millward, Kelly
34	26 April 1909	Wolverhampton Wanderers Reserves	A	0–1	3,000	

=== FA Cup ===
Round	Date	Opponent	Venue	Result	Attendance	Scorers
R1	16 January 1909	The Wednesday	A	0–5	8,000	

== Squad statistics ==
Pos.	Name	League		FA Cup		Total	
Pos.	Name	Apps	Goals	Apps	Goals	Apps	Goals
GK	(England) Jack Benton	1	0	1	0	2	0
GK	(England) Harry Cotton	2	0	0	0	2	0
GK	(England) Bert Miller	11	0	0	0	11	0
GK	(England) Fred Rathbone	18	0	0	0	18	0
GK	(England) Fred Wain	2	0	0	0	2	0
FB	(England) Harry Hutsby	31	0	1	0	32	0
FB	(England) Charles James	5	0	0	0	5	0
FB	(England) Ernest Mullineux	29	0	1	0	30	0
FB	(England) George Turner	15	0	0	0	15	0
FB	(England) Jimmy Williams	2	0	0	0	2	0
HB	(England) Sam Baddeley	32	1	1	0	33	1
HB	(England) Albert Cook	11	1	0	0	11	1
HB	(England) William Harding	5	0	0	0	5	0
HB	(England) Dick Hawe	1	0	0	0	1	0
HB	(England) Chris Kelly	19	1	1	0	20	1
HB	(England) Albert Pitt	31	4	1	0	32	4
HB	(England) Josuah Turner	1	0	0	0	1	0
FW	(England) Albert Bullock	4	1	0	0	4	1
FW	(England) William Davies	20	14	1	0	21	14
FW	(England) Francis Eardley	3	2	0	0	3	2
FW	(England) Arthur Fielding	3	0	0	0	3	0
FW	(England) Thomas Greaves	10	5	0	0	10	5
FW	(England) Edwin Griffiths	7	0	0	0	7	0
FW	(England) James Gorman	17	7	0	0	17	7
FW	(England) Ade Hamnett	9	0	0	0	9	0
FW	(England) Fred Hargraves	14	11	1	0	15	11
FW	(England) Vic Horrocks	18	6	1	0	19	6
FW	(England) Sam Howshall	1	2	0	0	1	2
FW	(Scotland) Sam McAllister	15	3	1	0	16	3
FW	(England) Ernie Millward	29	9	1	0	30	9
FW	(England) Herbert Myatt	4	2	0	0	4	2
FW	(England) Syd Owen	4	2	0	0	4	2
