= John Bamber =

John Bamber may refer to:

- Jack Bamber (1895–1973), English footballer
- John Bamber (footballer, born 1912) (1912–2000), English footballer
