= William Harding (footballer) =

English footballer

Personal information
- Full name: William Harding
- Date of birth: 1883
- Place of birth: Stoke-upon-Trent, England
- Date of death: 1967 (aged 84)
- Place of death: Stoke-on-Trent, England
- Position: Defender

Senior career*
Years	Team	Apps	(Gls)
19??–1908	Wolstanton RS		
1908–1909	Stoke	5	(0)
1909–19??	Ribbendale FC		
- * Club domestic league appearances and goals

William Harding (1883–1967) was an English footballer who played for Stoke.

== Career ==
Turner was born in Stoke-upon-Trent and played amateur football with Wolstanton RS before joining Stoke in 1908. He played in five first team matches during the 1908–09 season before returning to amateur football with Ribbendale.

== Career statistics ==
Club	Season	League		FA Cup		Total	
Club	Season	Apps	Goals	Apps	Goals	Apps	Goals
Stoke	1908–09	5	0	0	0	5	0
Career Total		5	0	0	0	5	0
