= Fred Wain =

English footballer

Personal information
- Full name: Fredrick Wain
- Date of birth: 1887
- Place of birth: Stoke-upon-Trent, England
- Date of death: 1962 (aged 75)
- Place of death: Stoke-on-Trent, England
- Position: Goalkeeper

Senior career*
Years	Team	Apps	(Gls)
–	Hanley St Jude's		
–	Hanley Villa		
–	Smallthorne United		
–	Norwood		
–	Stone Town		
1908–1909	Stoke	2	(0)
–	Stone Town		
–	Hanley Swifts		
–	Hanley Town		
- * Club domestic league appearances and goals

Fredrick Wain (1887 – 1962) was an English footballer who played for Stoke.

== Career ==
Wain was born in Stoke-upon-Trent and played for a number of amateur team before joining Stoke in 1908. He played twice for Stoke in the 1908–09 season before returning to amateur football with Stone Town, Hanley Swifts and Hanley Town. It is believed that Wain played for Hanley well into his 50s.

== Career statistics ==
Club	Season	League		FA Cup		Total	
Club	Season	Apps	Goals	Apps	Goals	Apps	Goals
Stoke	1908–09	2	0	0	0	2	0
Career Total		2	0	0	0	2	0
