= Edwin Griffiths =

English footballer

Personal information
- Full name: Edwin Griffiths
- Date of birth: 1884
- Place of birth: Hanley, Stoke-upon-Trent, England
- Date of death: 1950 (aged 66)
- Place of death: Stoke-upon-Trent, England
- Position: Forward

Senior career*
Years	Team	Apps	(Gls)
- Charterhouse School
- Old Carthusians
- North Staffs Normads
1908–1909	Stoke	7	(0)
1909–1915	North Staffs Normads		
- * Club domestic league appearances and goals

Edwin Griffiths (1884–1950) was an English footballer who played for Stoke.

== Career ==
Griffiths was born in Hanley and played football with his old Charterhouse SchooL, Old Carthusians and North Staffs Normads before joining Stoke in 1908. He played seven matches for Stoke during the 1908–09 season and after failing to score he returned to amateur football.

== Career statistics ==
Club	Season	League		FA Cup		Total	
Club	Season	Apps	Goals	Apps	Goals	Apps	Goals
Stoke	1908–09	7	0	0	0	7	0
Career Total		7	0	0	0	7	0
