= Fred Rathbone =

English footballer

Personal information
- Full name: Fred Rathbone
- Date of birth: 3 August 1885
- Place of birth: Meir, Staffordshire, England
- Date of death: 1959 (aged 73)
- Position: Goalkeeper

Senior career*
Years	Team	Apps	(Gls)
1905	Newcastle Rangers		
1906–1908	Stoke	3	(0)
1908	Whitchurch		
1908–1911	Stoke	29	(0)
1911	Winsford		
Total		32	(0)
- * Club domestic league appearances and goals

Fred Rathbone (3 August 1885 – 1959) was an English footballer who played in the Football League for Stoke.

== Career ==
Rathbone joined Stoke on his 21st birthday and made his debut against Sheffield Wednesday where he managed to keep a clean sheet. However first team opportunities were rare for Rathbone his only run in the side came when the club was playing in the Birmingham League.

== Career statistics ==
Appearances and goals by club, season and competition
Club	Season	League			FA Cup		Total	
Club	Season	Division	Apps	Goals	Apps	Goals	Apps	Goals
Stoke	1906–07	First Division	1	0	0	0	1	0
Stoke	1907–08	Second Division	2	0	0	0	2	0
Stoke	1908–09	Birmingham & District League	18	0	0	0	18	0
Stoke	1909–10	Birmingham & District League / Southern League Division Two	7	0	0	0	7	0
Stoke	1910–11	Birmingham & District League / Southern League Division Two	4	0	0	0	4	0
Career total			32	0	0	0	32	0
