= Arthur Fielding =

English footballer

Personal information
- Full name: Arthur John Fielding
- Date of birth: 17 March 1888
- Place of birth: Stoke-upon-Trent, England
- Date of death: before 1960
- Place of death: Stoke-on-Trent, England
- Position: Forward

Senior career*
Years	Team	Apps	(Gls)
- Dresden Athletic
- Dresden Victoria
- Florence Colliery
- Bolton Wanderers
- Florence Colliery
1908–1909	Stoke	3	(0)
1910	Florence Colliery		
1910–1911	Port Vale	4	(5)
- * Club domestic league appearances and goals

Arthur John Fielding (17 March 1888 – before 1960) was an English footballer who played as a forward for Bolton Wanderers, Stoke, and Port Vale.

== Career ==
Fielding was born in Stoke-upon-Trent and started his career with local clubs Dresden Athletic and Dresden Victoria before moving on to Florence Colliery. He signed with Bolton Wanderers before returning to Florence Colliery. In 1908 he joined Birmingham & District League side Stoke and made three appearances in 1908–09, before returning to amateur football with Florence Colliery. In September 1910 he joined North Staffordshire & District League side Port Vale, scoring five goals in six overall appearances; however, after suffering an injury in October of that year, he dropped out of the team and was released at the end of the campaign.

== Career statistics ==
Appearances and goals by club, season and competition
Club	Season	League			FA Cup		Total	
Club	Season	Division	Apps	Goals	Apps	Goals	Apps	Goals
Stoke	1908–09	Birmingham & District League	3	0	0	0	3	0
Port Vale	1910–11	North Staffordshire & District League	4	5	0	0	4	5
