= Charles James (footballer) =

English footballer

Personal information
- Full name: Charles James
- Date of birth: 1882
- Place of birth: Stoke-upon-Trent, England
- Date of death: 1960 (aged 78)
- Position: Defender

Senior career*
Years	Team	Apps	(Gls)
19??–1908	Halmerend		
1908–1914	Stoke	13	(0)
1915–19??	Florence Colliery		
- * Club domestic league appearances and goals

Charles James (1882–1960) was an English footballer who played for Stoke.

== Career ==
James was born in Stoke-upon-Trent and played for amateur side Halmerend before joining Stoke in 1908. He became a bit-part player for Stoke in this three seasons there making a modest 13 appearances. He later worked at the Florence Colliery and also played for the works football team.

== Career statistics ==
Appearances and goals by club, season and competition
Club	Season	League		FA Cup		Total	
Club	Season	Apps	Goals	Apps	Goals	Apps	Goals
Stoke	1908–09	5	0	0	0	5	0
Stoke	1909–10	3	0	0	0	3	0
Stoke	1910–11	3	0	0	0	3	0
Stoke	1911–12	0	0	0	0	0	0
Stoke	1912–13	1	0	0	0	1	0
Stoke	1913–14	1	0	0	0	1	0
Career total		13	0	0	0	13	0
