= Albert Bullock =

English footballer

Personal information
- Date of birth: 1884
- Place of birth: Stoke-upon-Trent, England
- Date of death: 1951 (aged 67)
- Place of death: Stoke-on-Trent, England
- Position: Forward

Senior career*
Years	Team	Apps	(Gls)
19??–1908	Bucknall		
1908–1910	Stoke	5	(1)
1910–19??	Stafford Rangers		
- * Club domestic league appearances and goals

Albert Bullock (1884–1951) was an English footballer who played for Stoke.

== Career ==
Bullock was born in Stoke-upon-Trent and played amateur football with Bucknall before joining Stoke in 1908. He played in three matches in the 1908–09 season scoring once against Shrewsbury Town. He managed just one appearance in the following season before joining Stafford Rangers.

== Career statistics ==
Club	Season	League		FA Cup		Total	
Club	Season	Apps	Goals	Apps	Goals	Apps	Goals
Stoke	1908–09	4	1	0	0	4	1
Stoke	1909–10	1	0	0	0	1	0
Career Total		5	1	0	0	5	1
