= Bert Miller (footballer) =

English footballer

Personal information
- Date of birth: 1880
- Place of birth: Newcastle-under-Lyme, England
- Date of death: 1953 (aged 72–73)
- Place of death: Stoke-on-Trent, England
- Position: Goalkeeper

Senior career*
Years	Team	Apps	(Gls)
- Tunstall Park
–	Newcastle St Giles		
–	Newcastle Swifts		
–	Cross Heath FC		
–	Burslem LR		
–	Blackpool Etrurians		
–	Stafford Rangers		
1907–1908	Norwich City	0	(0)
1908–1909	Stoke	11	(0)
1910–1912	Leek United		
- * Club domestic league appearances and goals

Albert Bertrand W. Miller (1880–1953) was an English footballer who played for Stoke.

== Career ==
Miller was born in Newcastle-under-Lyme and began his career with a number of local amateur sides. His performances for Stafford Rangers earned him a move to Norwich City but after failing to make an appearance he returned to his home town and joined Stoke and played 11 matches for Stoke in the 1908–09 season. He later was a key figure at the Staffordshire Football Association.

== Career statistics ==
Appearances and goals by club, season and competition
Club	Season	League		FA Cup		Total	
Club	Season	Apps	Goals	Apps	Goals	Apps	Goals
Stoke	1908–09	11	0	0	0	11	0
Career total		11	0	0	0	11	0
