= Vic Horrocks =

English footballer

Personal information
- Full name: Victor Horrocks
- Date of birth: 1884
- Place of birth: Goldenhill, Staffordshire, England
- Date of death: 7 January 1922 (aged 37-38)
- Place of death: Hartshill, Stoke-on-Trent, England
- Positions: Half-back; forward

Youth career
- Burslem Park Boys
- Goldenhill Wanderers

Senior career*
Years	Team	Apps	(Gls)
1904	Stoke	0	(0)
- Talke United
- Sandyford
- Goldenhill United
1905–1907	Burslem Port Vale	37	(2)
- Goldenhill United
1908–1911	Stoke	19	(8)
1911–1912	Port Vale	4	(0)
- Congleton Town
- * Club domestic league appearances and goals

Victor Horrocks (1884 – 7 January 1922) was an English footballer who played football in Staffordshire, most notable with Stoke and Port Vale.

== Career ==
Horrocks played for local sides Goldenhill Wanderers, Stoke (without playing a first-team game), Talke United, Sandyford and Goldenhill United before signing with Burslem Port Vale in April 1905. He scored on his debut at outside-left in a 3–1 defeat by Bolton Wanderers at Burnden Park on 15 April. Six days later he scored in a 3–2 win over Gainsborough Trinity at the Athletic Ground, and ended the 1904–05 season with two goals in four Second Division games. He played 19 league and two FA Cup games in the 1905–06 campaign, and featured just ten times in the 1906–07 season as he was affected by injury. The club suffered a financial crisis and went into liquidation in the summer of 1907, and was forced to release all its players, including Horrocks. He returned to Goldenhill United, before re-joining Stoke. He opened his account for the "Potters" on 10 October 1908, claiming two goals in a 7–0 win over Wellington Town at the Victoria Ground and went on to score six goals in 19 appearances in the 1908–09 season for the Birmingham & District League side. He featured in just one FA Cup game in the 1909–10 season and played only one Southern League game in the 1910–11 campaign. He scored a hat-trick in his final appearance for Stoke, a 3–0 win over Chesham Town on 5 November 1910. He rejoined Port Vale in September 1911. However, he played just four Central League games before getting released for a second time, most likely in 1912. He moved on to Congleton Town before dying in his late 30s.

== Career statistics ==
Appearances and goals by club, season and competition
Club	Season	League			FA Cup		Total	
Club	Season	Division	Apps	Goals	Apps	Goals	Apps	Goals
Burslem Port Vale	1904–05	Second Division	4	2	0	0	4	2
Burslem Port Vale	1905–06	Second Division	19	0	2	0	21	0
Burslem Port Vale	1906–07	Second Division	10	0	0	0	10	0
Burslem Port Vale	Total		37	2	2	0	39	2
Stoke	1908–09	Birmingham & District League	18	5	0	0	18	5
Stoke	1909–10	Birmingham & District League / Southern League Division Two	0	0	1	0	1	0
Stoke	1910–11	Birmingham & District League / Southern League Division Two	1	3	0	0	1	3
Stoke	Total		19	8	1	0	20	8
Port Vale	1911–12	Central League	4	0	0	0	4	0
Career total			60	10	3	0	63	10
