= Sam McAllister (footballer) =

Scottish-born English footballer

Personal information
- Full name: Samuel McAllister
- Date of birth: 1882
- Place of birth: Kilmarnock, Scotland
- Date of death: 1957 (aged 75)
- Place of death: Scotland
- Position: Forward

Senior career*
Years	Team	Apps	(Gls)
- Motherwell
–	West Ham United		
–	Grimsby Town		
–	Wrexham		
1908–1909	Stoke	15	(3)
–	Port Glasgow		
- * Club domestic league appearances and goals

Samuel McAllister (1882–1957) was an English footballer who played for Grimsby Town, Motherwell, Stoke, West Ham United and Wrexham.

== Career ==
McAllister was born in Kilmarnock and played Motherwell, West Ham United, Grimsby Town and Wrexham before joining Stoke in 1908. He played in 16 matches during the 1909–10 season scoring three goals before returning to Scottish football with Port Glasgow.

== Career statistics ==
Club	Season	League		FA Cup		Total	
Club	Season	Apps	Goals	Apps	Goals	Apps	Goals
Stoke	1908–09	15	3	1	0	16	3
Career Total		15	3	1	0	16	3
