= Ernald Scattergood =

English footballer

Personal information
- Full name: Ernald Oak Scattergood
- Date of birth: 29 May 1887
- Place of birth: Riddings, England
- Date of death: 2 July 1932 (aged 45)
- Place of death: Creswell, England
- Height: 5 ft 8 in (1.73 m)
- Position: Goalkeeper

Youth career
- 1904–1905: Riddings St. James
- 1905–1907: Ripley Athletic

Senior career*
Years	Team	Apps	(Gls)
1907–1915	Derby County	181	(3)
1915–1925	Bradford Park Avenue	268	(5)
- Alfreton Town

International career
1913	England	1	(0)
- * Club domestic league appearances and goals

Ernald Oak Scattergood (29 May 1887 – 2 July 1932) was an English professional footballer who played as a goalkeeper in the Football League for Bradford Park Avenue and Derby County. He won one cap for England in 1913.

== Personal life ==
As of 1901, Scattergood was working as a colliery trammer. He married in 1910 and had two children, one of whom, Ken, also become a goalkeeper. Scattergood served as a gunner in the Royal Garrison Artillery during the First World War.

== Career statistics ==
Appearances and goals by club, season and competition
Club	Season	League			National Cup		Total	
Club	Season	Division	Apps	Goals	Apps	Goals	Apps	Goals
Derby County	1907–08	Second Division	3	0	0	0	3	0
Derby County	1908–09	Second Division	4	0	1	0	5	0
Derby County	1909–10	Second Division	31	0	2	0	33	0
Derby County	1910–11	Second Division	36	0	4	0	40	0
Derby County	1911–12	Second Division	37	0	2	0	39	0
Derby County	1912–13	First Division	34	1	1	0	35	1
Derby County	1913–14	First Division	29	2	0	0	29	2
Derby County	1914–15	Second Division	7	0	0	0	7	0
Career total			181	3	10	0	191	3

== Honours ==
Derby County

- Football League Second Division: 1911–12
