= Ade Hamnett =

English footballer

Personal information
- Full name: Ade Samuel Hamnett
- Date of birth: 1882
- Place of birth: Chester, England
- Date of death: 1956 (aged 74)
- Position: Midfielder

Senior career*
Years	Team	Apps	(Gls)
19??–1908	Birkenhead		
1908–1909	Stoke	9	(0)
1909	Annfield Plain		
1912–1914	Crewe All Saints		
- * Club domestic league appearances and goals

Ade Samuel Hamnett (1882 – 1956) was an English footballer who played for Stoke.

== Career ==
Hamnett was born in Chester and played for Birkenhead before joining Stoke in 1908. He played nine times for Stoke in 1908–09 before returning to amateur football with Annfield Plain and then Crewe All Saints.

== Career statistics ==
Club	Season	League		FA Cup		Total	
Club	Season	Apps	Goals	Apps	Goals	Apps	Goals
Stoke	1908–09	9	0	0	0	9	0
Career Total		9	0	0	0	9	0
