= Chris Kelly (footballer, born 1887) =

English footballer

Personal information
- Full name: Christopher Kelly
- Date of birth: 1887
- Place of birth: Tunstall, England
- Date of death: 1960 (aged 72–73)
- Place of death: York, England
- Position: Defender

Senior career*
| Years | Team | Apps | (Gls) |
| 1907 | Goldenhill Wanderers | | |
| 1908–1909 | Stoke | 19 | (1) |
| 1910 | Denaby United | | |
| 1910–1911 | Leeds City | 4 | (0) |
| Total | | 23 | (1) |
- * Club domestic league appearances and goals

Christopher Kelly (1887 – 1960) was an English footballer who played for Leeds City and Stoke.

== Career ==
Kelly was born in Tunstall and played amateur football with Goldenhill Wanderers before joining Stoke in 1908. He played in 20 matches during the 1908–09 season before returning to amateur football with Denaby United. He then had a short spell at Leeds City.

== Career statistics ==
Appearances and goals by club, season and competition
| Club | Season | League | | | FA Cup | | Total | |
| Club | Season | Division | Apps | Goals | Apps | Goals | Apps | Goals |
|---|---|---|---|---|---|---|---|---|
| Stoke | 1908–09 | Birmingham & District League | 19 | 1 | 1 | 0 | 20 | 1 |
| Leeds City | 1910–11 | Second Division | 3 | 0 | 0 | 0 | 3 | 0 |
| Leeds City | 1911–12 | Second Division | 1 | 0 | 0 | 0 | 1 | 0 |
| Career total | | | 24 | 1 | 1 | 0 | 25 | 1 |
