= Fred Hargrave =

English footballer

Personal information
- Full name: Joseph Frederick Hargrave
- Date of birth: 1880
- Place of birth: Atherstone, England
- Date of death: 19 October 1917 (aged 37)
- Place of death: West Flanders, Belgium
- Positions: Centre forward; right half

Senior career*
Years	Team	Apps	(Gls)
1899–1901	Atherstone Town		
1901–1902	Aston Villa	0	(0)
1902–1903	Walsall		
1903–1905	Burton United	56	(14)
1905–1908	Leeds City	63	(12)
1908–1909	Stoke	14	(11)
Total		133	(37)
- * Club domestic league appearances and goals

Joseph Frederick Hargrave (1880 – 19 October 1917), sometimes known as Fred Hargraves or Fred Hargreaves, was an English professional footballer who played as a centre forward for Burton United, Leeds City and Stoke.

== Career ==
A centre forward, Hargrave began his career with his local non-league club Atherstone Town, before transferring to First Division club Aston Villa in July 1901, for whom he failed to make a senior appearance. After a spell with Midland League club Walsall, he transferred to Second Division club Burton United in July 1903. He top-scored for the club during the 1902–03 season and finished his three-year spell with 23 goals in 72 appearances. Hargrave transferred to fellow Second Division club Leeds City in July 1905 and had a prolific 1905–06 season in front of goal, scoring 19 goals in 34 appearances, which included seven goals in six FA Cup matches. He was moved to right half during the 1906–07 season and as a result, his goals dried up. Hargrave departed Leeds City in 1908 for Birmingham & District League club Stoke and scored 11 goals in 15 matches for the "Potters" during the 1908–09 season.

== Personal life ==
As of 1911, Hargrave was working as a hatter. In December 1915, during the second year of the First World War, he enlisted as a private in the Royal Garrison Artillery in Atherstone. While holding the rank of gunner, Hargrave was killed at Passchendaele on 19 October 1917 and was buried in Steenkerke Belgian Military Cemetery.

== Career statistics ==
Appearances and goals by club, season and competition
Club	Season	League			FA Cup		Total	
Club	Season	Division	Apps	Goals	Apps	Goals	Apps	Goals
Burton United	1903–04	Second Division	30	9	8	6	38	15
Burton United	1904–05	Second Division	26	5	0	0	26	5
Burton United	Total		56	14	8	6	64	20
Leeds City	1905–06	Second Division	28	12	6	7	34	19
Leeds City	1906–07	Second Division	33	0	1	0	34	0
Leeds City	1907–08	Second Division	2	0	0	0	2	0
Leeds City	Total		63	12	7	7	70	19
Stoke	1908–09	Birmingham & District League	14	11	1	0	15	11
Career total			133	37	16	13	149	50
