= Thomas Greaves (footballer) =

English footballer

Personal information
- Full name: Thomas Greaves
- Date of birth: 12 April 1888
- Place of birth: Hanley, England
- Date of death: 1960 (aged 72)
- Place of death: Stoke-on-Trent, England
- Position: Forward

Senior career*
Years	Team	Apps	(Gls)
19??–1908	Goldenhill Villa		
1908–1910	Stoke	13	(5)
1911–19??	Hanley Swifts		
- Merthyr Town
1913–1920	Macclesfield	61	(45)
- * Club domestic league appearances and goals

Thomas Greaves (12 April 1888 – 1960) was an English footballer who played for Stoke.

== Career ==
Greaves was born in Hanley and played amateur football with Goldenhill Villa before joining Stoke in 1908. He played 13 times for Stoke scoring five goals and left for Hanley Swifts in 1911.

== Career statistics ==
Club	Season	League		FA Cup		Total	
Club	Season	Apps	Goals	Apps	Goals	Apps	Goals
Stoke	1908–09	10	5	0	0	10	5
Stoke	1909–10	2	0	0	0	2	0
Stoke	1910–11	1	0	0	0	1	0
Career total		13	5	0	0	13	5
