= Herbert Myatt =

English footballer

Personal information
- Full name: Herbert Myatt
- Date of birth: 1884
- Place of birth: Stoke-upon-Trent, England
- Date of death: 1967 (aged 83)
- Place of death: Sneyd Green, England
- Position: Forward

Senior career*
Years	Team	Apps	(Gls)
19??–1908	Stone Town		
1908–1909	Stoke	4	(2)
1910–19??	Stafford Rangers		
- * Club domestic league appearances and goals

Herbert Myatt (1884 – 1967) was an English footballer who played for Stoke.

== Career ==
Myatt was born in Stoke-upon-Trent and played amateur football with Stone Town before joining Stoke in 1908. He played for matches for Stoke in 1908–09 scoring twice. He later played for Stafford Rangers.

== Career statistics ==
Appearances and goals by club, season and competition
Club	Season	League		FA Cup		Total	
Club	Season	Apps	Goals	Apps	Goals	Apps	Goals
Stoke	1908–09	4	2	0	0	4	2
Career total		4	2	0	0	4	2
