= Syd Owen (footballer, born 1885) =

English footballer

Personal information
- Full name: Alfred Sydney Owen
- Date of birth: c. 1885
- Place of birth: Newcastle-under-Lyme, England
- Date of death: 22 August 1925 (aged 39–40)
- Place of death: Blackpool, England
- Position: Forward

Youth career
- North Staffs Nomads

Senior career*
Years	Team	Apps	(Gls)
1906	Stoke	1	(0)
1907	Stockport County	1	(0)
1907	Stoke	9	(6)
1907	→ Port Vale (loan)	1	(0)
1907–1910	Leicester Fosse	43	(12)
1910	Newcastle Town		
1911–1912	Blackpool	2	(0)
1912	Stoke	0	(0)
- Northern Nomads
- English Wanderers
Total		57	(18)

International career
1909–1910	England amateur	3	(5)
- * Club domestic league appearances and goals

Alfred Sydney Owen (c. 1885 – 22 August 1925) was an English footballer who played as a forward for Stoke, Stockport County, Port Vale, Leicester Fosse, Newcastle Town, Blackpool, Northern Nomads, and English Wanderers. He scored a hat-trick for the England amateurs team in a 7–0 win over Sweden at Anlaby Road on 6 November 1909. Owen was the brother of Wally, who played for North Staffs Nomads, Stoke, Manchester City and Port Vale.

== Club career ==
Owen played for North Staffs Nomads before playing one First Division match for Stoke in the 1906–07 relegation season. He also played one Second Division game for Stockport County before guesting for Port Vale in a 1–0 win over Hanley Town in a North Staffordshire Federation League match at the Athletic Ground on 26 October 1907. He then returned to Stoke and scored his first league goal at the Victoria Ground in a 3–0 win over Lincoln City on 11 April 1908. He bagged a hat-trick a fortnight later, in a 4–0 win over Barnsley, and finished the 1907–08 season with four goals in five games. Stoke then quit the Football League, and Owen scored two goals in four Birmingham & District League games at the start of the 1908–09 season. He then moved on to Leicester Fosse. In September 1908, he returned to play two league and one cup games for Port Vale before returning to Leicester the following month. Afterwards he moved on to Newcastle Town, Blackpool, Stoke (without playing a game), Northern Nomads and English Wanderers.

== International career ==
Owen netted five goals in just three appearances for the England amateur team in 1909 and 1910. He made his debut for the team on 6 November 1909 against Sweden, netting a hat-trick in a 7–0 win. He then scored one goal in both his second and last cap, a 9–1 win over the Netherlands and a 2–2 draw with Belgium. He also made an unofficial appearance against Ireland, scoring in a dramatic 4–4 draw, which was the first time the Amateurs failed to win.

=== International goals ===
England Amateurs score listed first, score column indicates score after each Owen goal.

List of international goals scored by Syd Owen
No.	Cap	Date	Venue	Opponent	Score	Result	Competition	Ref
1	1	6 November 1909	Anlaby Road, Hull, England	Sweden	1–0	7–0	Friendly	
2	1	6 November 1909	Anlaby Road, Hull, England	Sweden	3–0	7–0	Friendly	
3	1	6 November 1909	Anlaby Road, Hull, England	Sweden	7–0	7–0	Friendly	
4	2	11 December 1909	Stamford Bridge, Fulham, England	Netherlands	6–1	9–1	Friendly	
5	3	26 March 1910	Sukkelweg, Brussels, Belgium	Belgium	?–?	2–2	Friendly	

== Career statistics ==
Appearances and goals by club, season and competition
Club	Season	League			FA Cup		Total	
Club	Season	Division	Apps	Goals	Apps	Goals	Apps	Goals
Stoke	1906–07	First Division	1	0	0	0	1	0
Stockport County	1907–08	Second Division	1	0	0	0	1	0
Stoke	1907–08	Second Division	5	4	0	0	5	4
Port Vale (guest)	1907–08	North Staffordshire Federation League	1	0	0	0	1	0
Stoke	1908–09	Birmingham & District League	4	2	0	0	4	2
Leicester Fosse	1908–09	First Division	13	7	1	0	14	7
Leicester Fosse	1909–10	Second Division	13	2	4	1	17	3
Leicester Fosse	1910–11	Second Division	17	3	3	0	20	3
Leicester Fosse	Total		43	12	8	1	51	13
Blackpool	1911–12	Second Division	2	0	0	0	2	0
Career total			57	18	8	1	65	19
