= Jack Benton =

English footballer

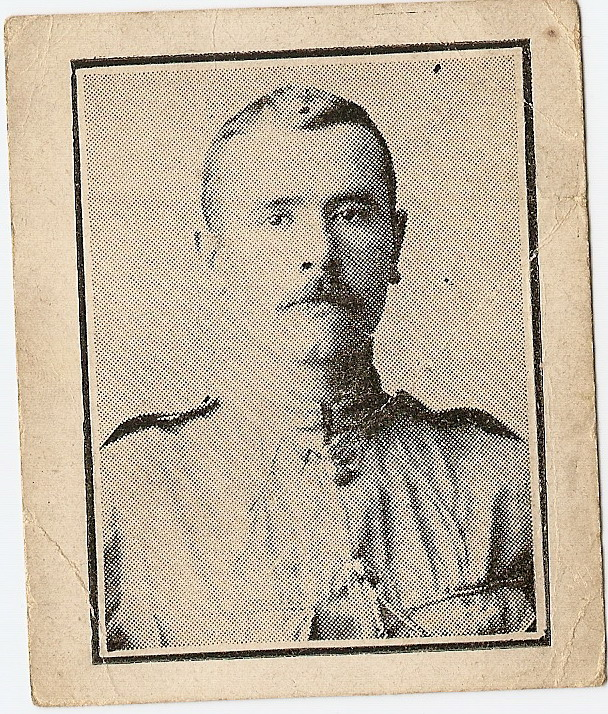
- John Dutton Benton c1900

Personal information
- Full name: John Dutton Benton
- Date of birth: 5 October 1875
- Place of birth: Newcastle-under-Lyme, England
- Date of death: 8 July 1926 (aged 50)
- Place of death: Hanley, Staffordshire, England
- Position: Goalkeeper

Senior career*
| Years | Team | Apps | (Gls) |
- Newcastle Swifts
- North Staffordshire Regiment
| 1898–1900 | Glentoran | | |
| 1900–1903 | Transvaal Police | | |
| 1904–1905 | Stoke | 4 | (0) |
| 1905–1908 | Glentoran | | |
| 1908–1910 | Stoke | 5 | (0) |
- * Club domestic league appearances and goals

John Dutton Benton (5 October 1875 – 8 July 1926) was an English footballer who played in the Football League for Stoke.

== Football career ==
Benton represented the Irish League on three occasions while he was a Glentoran player. He then travelled to South Africa where he assisted Transvaal Police, on his return to England he joined Stoke. Benton made his League debut against Sheffield Wednesday. When Leigh Richmond Roose joined the club in 1905, Benton re-joined Glentoran. He came back to Stoke in 1908 and played five more times before retiring in 1910 through injury. Benton remained with Stoke and became club trainer up until 1918.

== Army career ==
From 1893 to 1904 Benton was enlisted in the army in the 4th Battalion North Staffordshire Regiment. He served as a corporal in Belfast (Northern Ireland) and in the South Africa in the Boer War. He was discharged in 1904 having been promoted to the rank of Sergeant of Police. His parents were Joseph Benton (1843–1920, a cooper by trade) and Sarah Ann Dutton (1853–1922), both of Staffordshire.

== Career statistics ==
Appearances and goals by club, season and competition
| Club | Season | League | | | FA Cup | | Total | |
| Club | Season | Division | Apps | Goals | Apps | Goals | Apps | Goals |
|---|---|---|---|---|---|---|---|---|
| Stoke | 1903–04 | First Division | 1 | 0 | 0 | 0 | 1 | 0 |
| Stoke | 1904–05 | First Division | 2 | 0 | 0 | 0 | 2 | 0 |
| Stoke | 1905–06 | First Division | 1 | 0 | 0 | 0 | 1 | 0 |
| Stoke | 1908–09 | Birmingham & District League | 1 | 0 | 1 | 0 | 2 | 0 |
| Stoke | 1909–10 | Birmingham & District League / Southern League Division Two | 4 | 0 | 0 | 0 | 4 | 0 |
| Career total | | | 9 | 0 | 1 | 0 | 10 | 0 |
