= Eric Lowell =

English footballer

Personal information
- Full name: Eric James Lowell
- Date of birth: 8 March 1935 (age 91)
- Place of birth: Stoke-on-Trent, England
- Position: Forward

Senior career*
Years	Team	Apps	(Gls)
1954–1955	Derby County	1	(1)
1955–1956	Stoke City	7	(3)
–	Stafford Rangers		
- * Club domestic league appearances and goals

Eric James Lowell (born 8 March 1935) is an English former footballer who played in the Football League for Derby County and Stoke City.

== Career ==
Lowell was born in Stoke-on-Trent but began his career with Derby County where he played and scored in one match in the 1954–55 season before he joined Stoke City. He played seven matches for Stoke during the 1955–56 season and scored three goals all of which came in the first month of the season. Despite this he never managed to claim a place in the first team and left for Stafford Rangers.

== Career statistics ==
Club	Season	League			FA Cup		Total	
Club	Season	Division	Apps	Goals	Apps	Goals	Apps	Goals
Derby County	1954–55	Second Division	1	1	0	0	1	1
Stoke City	1956–56	Second Division	7	3	0	0	7	3
Career Total			8	4	0	0	8	4
