= Myatt =

Myatt is an English (patronymic or paternal) family name. Variants of which include: Miatt, Myott, and Miot.

Notable people with this surname (or similar) include:

- Alan Myatt, British town crier
- David Myatt (born 1950), British philosopher, poet and former neo-Nazi
- George Myatt (1914-2000), American NFL player
- Glenn Myatt (1897-1969), American baseball player
- Harry Myatt (c1880-1967), former football (soccer) manager
- Herbert Myatt (1884–1967), English soccer player
- Hugo Myatt, British actor
- John Myatt (b. 1945), British artist
