= Josuah Turner =

English footballer

Personal information
- Full name: Josuah Turner
- Date of birth: 1884
- Place of birth: Tunstall, Staffordshire, England
- Date of death: 1960 (aged 76)
- Position: Defender

Senior career*
Years	Team	Apps	(Gls)
19??–1908	Tunstall		
1908–1909	Stoke	1	(0)
1909–19??	Tunstall		
- * Club domestic league appearances and goals

Josuah Turner (1884–1960) was an English footballer who played for Stoke.

== Career ==
Turner was born in Tunstall, Staffordshire and played amateur football with Tunstall before joining Stoke in 1908. He played in one first team match which came in a 4–1 defeat to Aston Villa Reserves during the 1908–09 season before returning to Tunstall.

== Career statistics ==
Appearances and goals by club, season and competition
Club	Season	League		FA Cup		Total	
Club	Season	Apps	Goals	Apps	Goals	Apps	Goals
Stoke	1908–09	1	0	0	0	1	0
Career total		1	0	0	0	1	0
