= Peter McArdle (footballer) =

English footballer (1914–1979)

Personal information
- Full name: Peter McArdle
- Date of birth: 8 April 1914
- Place of birth: Durham, England
- Date of death: 1979 (aged 64–65)
- Height: 5 ft 9 in (1.75 m)
- Position: Outside left

Senior career*
| Years | Team | Apps | (Gls) |
- Trimdon Grange Colliery
- Durham City
| 1933–1934 | Stoke City | 7 | (1) |
| 1935 | Exeter City | 9 | (1) |
| 1936 | Carlisle United | 27 | (12) |
| 1936–1937 | Barnsley | 16 | (3) |
| 1937 | Stockport County | 4 | (0) |
| 1938 | Gateshead | 20 | (5) |
| 1939 | Crewe Alexandra | 0 | (0) |
| Total | | 83 | (22) |
- * Club domestic league appearances and goals

Peter McArdle (8 April 1914 – 1979) was an English footballer who played in the Football League for Barnsley, Carlisle United, Exeter City, Gateshead, Stockport County and Stoke City.

== Career ==
McArdle was born in Durham and started playing football for local clubs Trimdon Grange Colliery and former league club Durham City. In 1933 he joined Stoke City as back up for England international winger Joe Johnson. Johnson was injured for six matches during the 1933–34 season and McArdle took his place and scored once against Newcastle United. When Johnson recovered from his injury he took back his place in the side and McArdle dropped back into the reserves. He made just one more appearance for Stoke which came in the 1934–35 season before leaving for regular football in November 1935 joining Exeter City. He soon moved back north to Carlisle United and went on to play for Barnsley, Stockport County, Gateshead and finally Crewe Alexandra.

== Career statistics ==
Appearances and goals by club, season and competition
| Club | Season | League | | | FA Cup | | Other^{[A]} | | Total | |
| Club | Season | Division | Apps | Goals | Apps | Goals | Apps | Goals | Apps | Goals |
|---|---|---|---|---|---|---|---|---|---|---|
| Stoke City | 1933–34 | First Division | 6 | 1 | 0 | 0 | – | | 6 | 1 |
| Stoke City | 1934–35 | First Division | 1 | 0 | 0 | 0 | – | | 1 | 0 |
| Exeter City | 1935–36 | Third Division South | 9 | 1 | 0 | 0 | 1 | 0 | 10 | 1 |
| Carlisle United | 1935–36 | Third Division North | 27 | 12 | 3 | 3 | 2 | 4 | 32 | 19 |
| Barnsley | 1936–37 | Second Division | 9 | 3 | 0 | 0 | 0 | 0 | 9 | 3 |
| Barnsley | 1937–38 | Second Division | 7 | 0 | 0 | 0 | 0 | 0 | 7 | 0 |
| Stockport County | 1937–38 | Second Division | 4 | 0 | 0 | 0 | 0 | 0 | 4 | 0 |
| Gateshead | 1938–39 | Third Division North | 20 | 5 | 0 | 0 | 3 | 0 | 23 | 5 |
| Career total | | | 83 | 22 | 3 | 3 | 6 | 4 | 92 | 29 |

A. The "Other" column constitutes appearances and goals in the Football League Third Division North Cup and Football League Third Division South Cup.
