= John Howshall =

English footballer

Personal information
- Full name: John Henry Howshall
- Date of birth: 12 July 1912
- Place of birth: Stoke-on-Trent, England
- Date of death: 1962 (aged 50)
- Height: 5 ft 9 in (1.75 m)
- Position: Defender

Senior career*
Years	Team	Apps	(Gls)
- Dresden Juniors
- Longton Juniors
- Dresden United
1933–1934	Stoke City	1	(0)
1934–1935	Chesterfield	25	(0)
1935–1936	Southport	51	(0)
1937–1938	Bristol Rovers	21	(0)
1938	Accrington Stanley	8	(0)
1938–1939	Carlisle United	32	(0)
–	Northwich Victoria		
–	Wigan Athletic		
Total		138	(0)
- * Club domestic league appearances and goals

John Henry Howshall (12 July 1912 – 1962) was an English footballer who played in the Football League for Accrington Stanley, Bristol Rovers, Carlisle United, Chesterfield, Southport and Stoke City.

== Career ==
Howshall was born in Stoke-on-Trent and played amateur football with Dresden Juniors, Longton Juniors and Dresden United before joining Stoke City in 1933. He played once for Stoke in 1932–33 which came in a 1–1 draw with Wolverhampton Wanderers on 30 September 1933. He was released at the end of the season and went on to play for Football League Third Division sides Chesterfield, Southport, Bristol Rovers, Accrington Stanley and Carlisle United before ending his career with non-league Northwich Victoria and Wigan Athletic.

== Career statistics ==
Appearances and goals by club, season and competition
Club	Season	League			FA Cup		3rd Div. Cup		Total	
Club	Season	Division	Apps	Goals	Apps	Goals	Apps	Goals	Apps	Goals
Stoke City	1932–33	First Division	1	0	0	0	0	0	1	0
Chesterfield	1934–35	Third Division North	25	0	1	0	1	0	27	0
Southport	1935–36	Third Division North	35	0	1	0	3	0	39	0
Southport	1936–37	Third Division North	16	0	2	0	4	0	22	0
Southport	Total		51	0	3	0	7	0	61	0
Bristol Rovers	1937–38	Third Division South	21	0	0	0	0	0	21	0
Accrington Stanley	1938–39	Third Division North	8	0	0	0	0	0	8	0
Carlisle United	1938–39	Third Division North	32	0	1	0	2	0	35	0
Career total			140	0	5	0	11	0	154	0
