= Sam Howshall =

English footballer

Personal information
- Full name: Samuel Howshall
- Date of birth: September 1883
- Place of birth: Cobridge, England
- Date of death: Unknown
- Position: Outside left

Youth career
- Newcastle Swifts

Senior career*
Years	Team	Apps	(Gls)
1903–1905	Burslem Port Vale	2	(0)
- Salisbury City
1907–1908	Clapton Orient	2	(0)
1908	Stoke	1	(2)
- Merthyr Town
Total		5+	(2+)
- * Club domestic league appearances and goals

Samuel Howshall (September 1883 – after 1908) was an English footballer who played for Burslem Port Vale, Clapton Orient, Stoke, and Merthyr Town.

== Career ==
Howshall played for Newcastle Swifts before joining Burslem Port Vale in May 1903. His first game was at outside-right in a 3–1 defeat to Preston North End at Deepdale on 3 October. After only one further Second Division appearance in the 1903–04 season he was released from the Athletic Ground at the end of the 1904–05 season. He moved on to Salisbury City before joining Clapton Orient. He returned to Staffordshire in the 1908–09 season to play one Birmingham & District League game for Stoke; he scored both goals in a 2–2 draw at Stourbridge on 14 September. After leaving the Victoria Ground he played for Merthyr Town.

== Career statistics ==
Appearances and goals by club, season and competition
Club	Season	League			FA Cup		Total	
Club	Season	Division	Apps	Goals	Apps	Goals	Apps	Goals
Burslem Port Vale	1903–04	Second Division	2	0	0	0	2	0
Clapton Orient	1907–08	Second Division	2	0	1	0	3	0
Stoke	1908–09	Birmingham & District League	1	2	0	0	1	2
