= Ken Scattergood =

English footballer

Personal information
- Full name: Kenneth Scattergood
- Date of birth: 6 April 1912
- Place of birth: Bradford, England
- Date of death: 1988 (aged 75–76)
- Position: Goalkeeper

Senior career*
Years	Team	Apps	(Gls)
1931–1932	Sheffield Wednesday	0	(0)
1932–1933	Wolverhampton Wanderers	0	(0)
1933–1934	Bristol City	39	(0)
1934–1935	Stoke City	4	(0)
1935–1936	Derby County	22	(0)
Total		65	(0)
- * Club domestic league appearances and goals

Kenneth Scattergood (6 April 1912 – 1988) was an English footballer who played in the Football League for Bristol City, Derby County and Stoke City.

== Career ==
Scattergood was born in Bradford and began his career with Sheffield Wednesday where he failed to make an appearance. He moved on to Wolverhampton Wanderers and again failed to get a game and so joined Bristol City. He missed just two matches for the "Robins" during the 1933–34 season and earned a move to First Division Stoke City. At Stoke he was second choice to Norman Lewis and as a result only managed to make four appearances during the 1934–35 season and left for Derby County where he finished his career.

== Personal life ==
Scattergood was the son of former goalkeeper Ernald Scattergood.

== Career statistics ==
Appearances and goals by club, season and competition
Club	Season	League			FA Cup		Total	
Club	Season	Division	Apps	Goals	Apps	Goals	Apps	Goals
Bristol City	1933–34	Third Division South	39	0	4	0	43	0
Stoke City	1934–35	First Division	4	0	0	0	4	0
Derby County	1935–36	First Division	15	0	3	0	18	0
Derby County	1936–37	First Division	7	0	0	0	7	0
Derby County	Total		22	0	3	0	25	0
Career total			65	0	7	0	72	0
