= James Gorman (footballer, born in Dudley) =

English footballer

Personal information
- Full name: John James Gorman
- Date of birth: 7 April 1882
- Place of birth: Dudley, England
- Position: Inside left

Senior career*
| Years | Team | Apps | (Gls) |
| 1905–1906 | Wolverhampton Wanderers | 9 | (4) |
| 1907 | Halesowen Town | | |
| 1908–1909 | Stoke | 17 | (7) |
| 1910 | Dudley Town | | |
- * Club domestic league appearances and goals

John James Gorman (7 April 1882 – after 1909) was an English footballer who played for Stoke and Wolverhampton Wanderers.

== Career ==
Gorman was born in Dudley and began his career with Wolverhampton Wanderers. He scored twice on his debut in a 7–0 victory over Derby County on 21 April 1906. He scored twice more in 1906–07 before leaving for Halesowen Town. He then joined Stoke in 1908 and played 17 times for the "Potters" in 1908–09 scoring seven goals. He left at the end of the season to play for his hometown club Dudley Town.

== Career statistics ==
Appearances and goals by club, season and competition
| Club | Season | League | | | FA Cup | | Total | |
| Club | Season | Division | Apps | Goals | Apps | Goals | Apps | Goals |
|---|---|---|---|---|---|---|---|---|
| Wolverhampton Wanderers | 1905–06 | First Division | 1 | 2 | 0 | 0 | 1 | 2 |
| Wolverhampton Wanderers | 1906–07 | Second Division | 8 | 2 | 0 | 0 | 8 | 2 |
| Wolverhampton Wanderers | Total | | 9 | 4 | 0 | 0 | 9 | 4 |
| Stoke | 1908–09 | Birmingham & District League | 17 | 7 | 0 | 0 | 17 | 7 |
| Career total | | | 26 | 11 | 0 | 0 | 26 | 11 |
