= Stoke-upon-Trent =

One of the Six Towns of Stoke-on-Trent, in Staffordshire, England

Coordinates: 53.0066°N 2.1877°W

Stoke-upon-Trent: Stoke
- Federated town and district
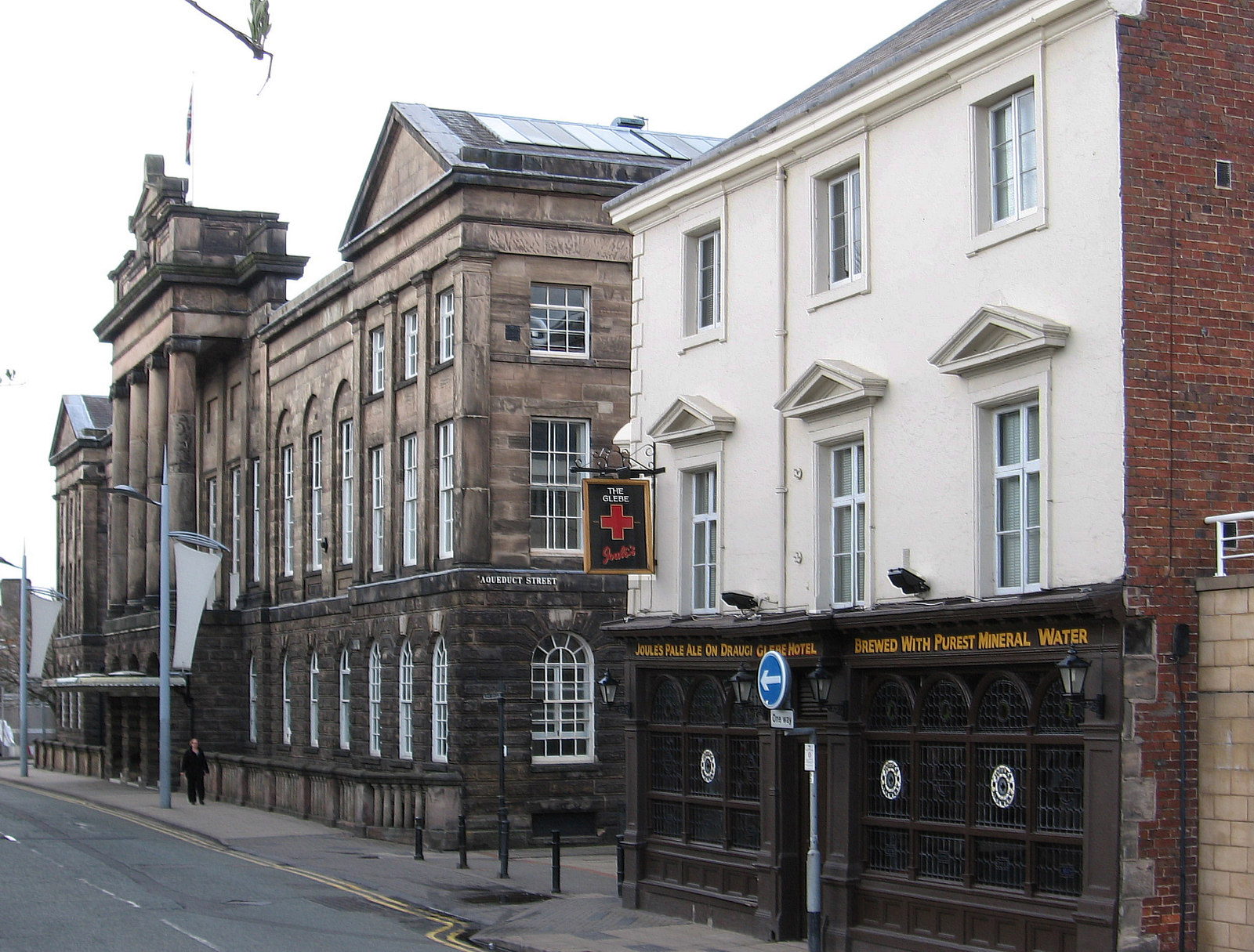
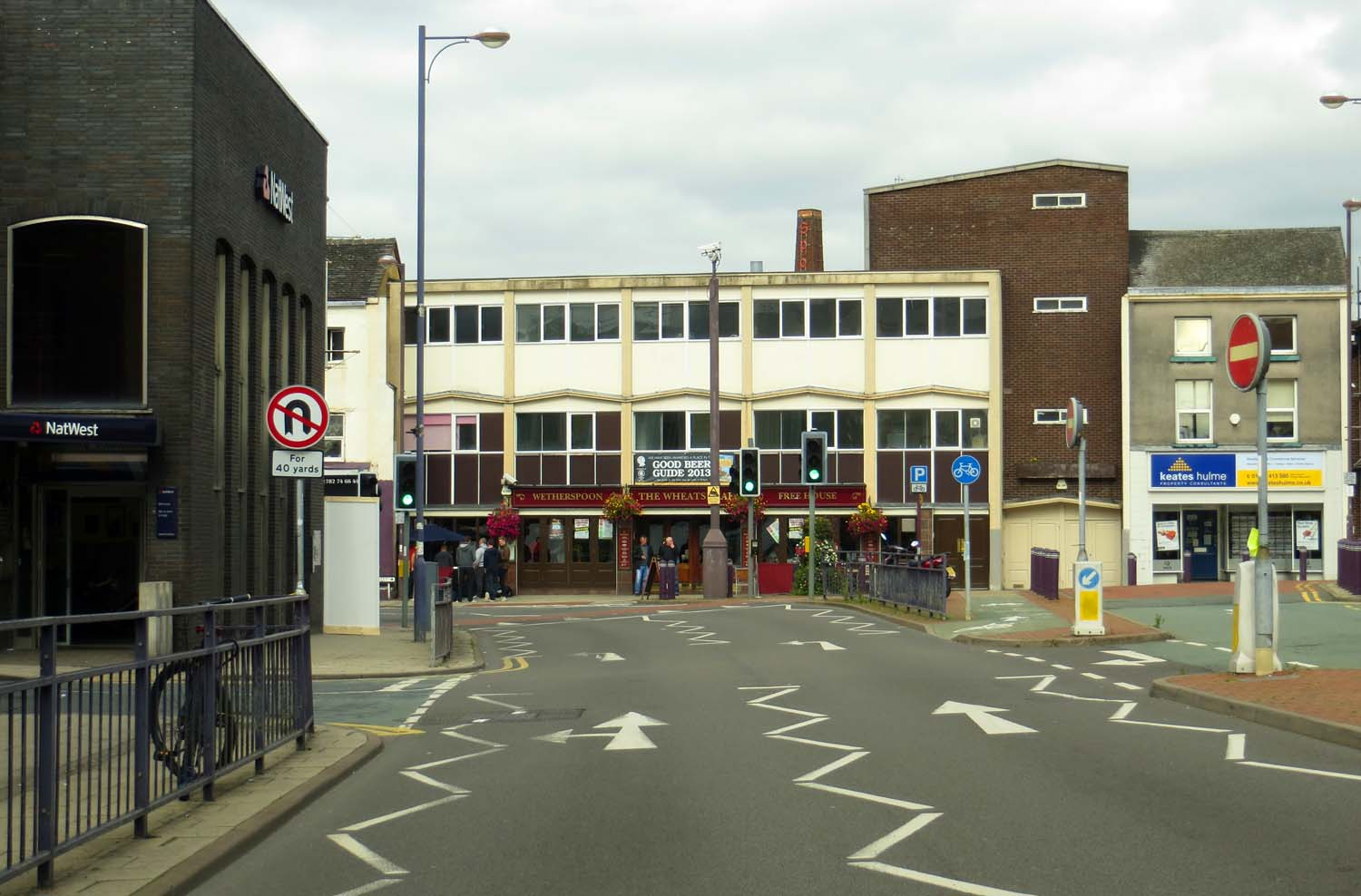
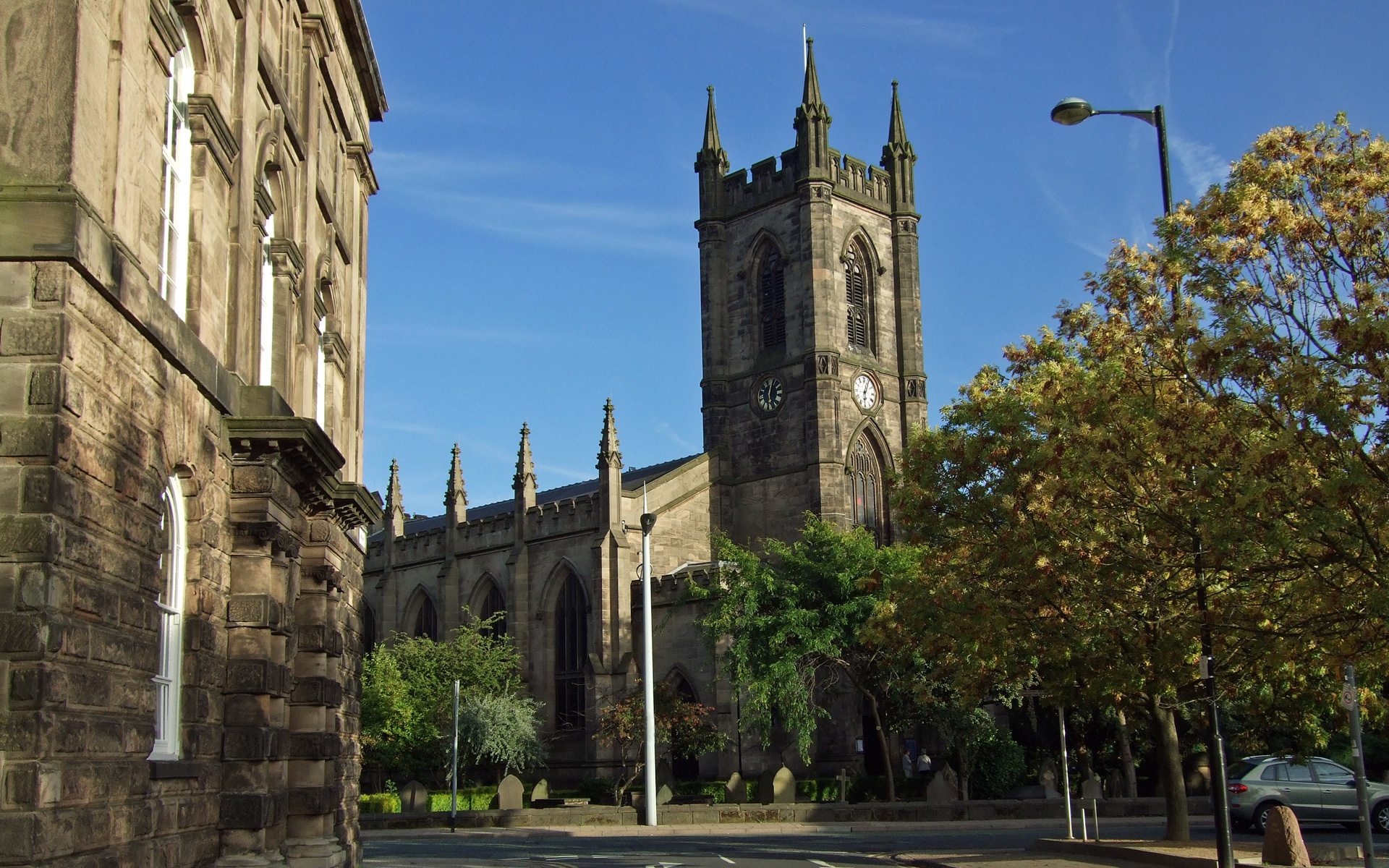
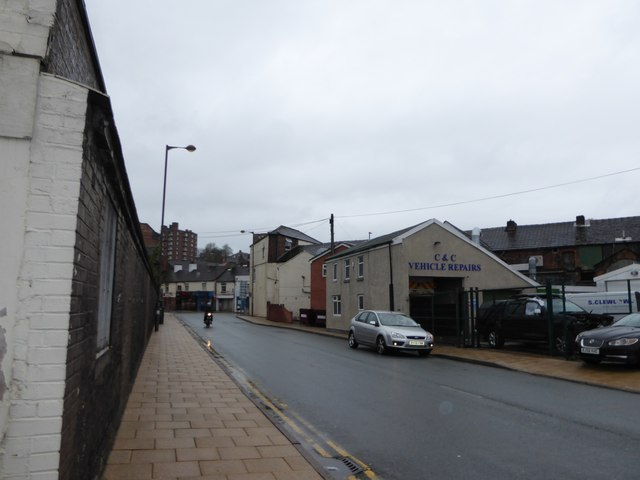
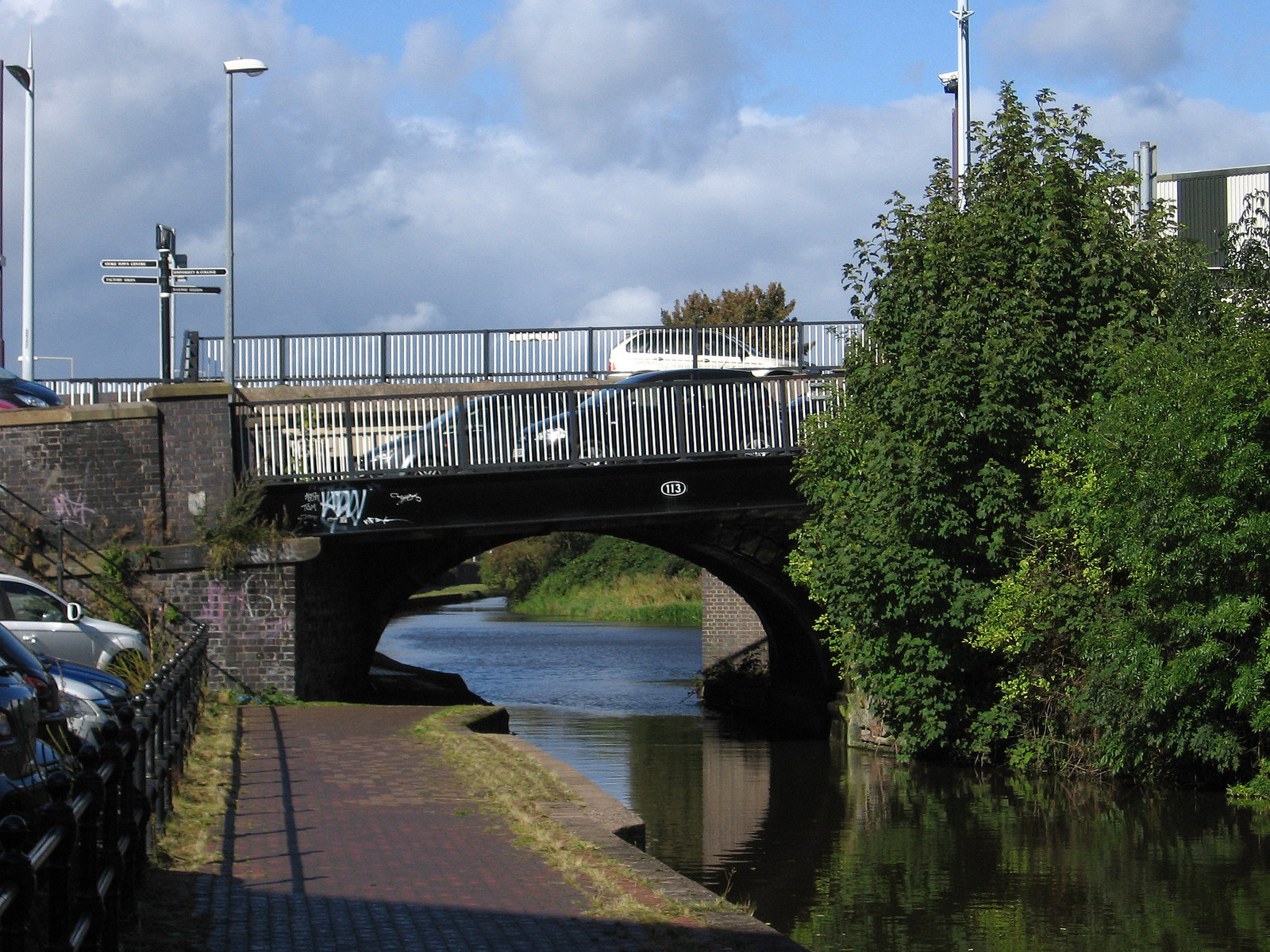
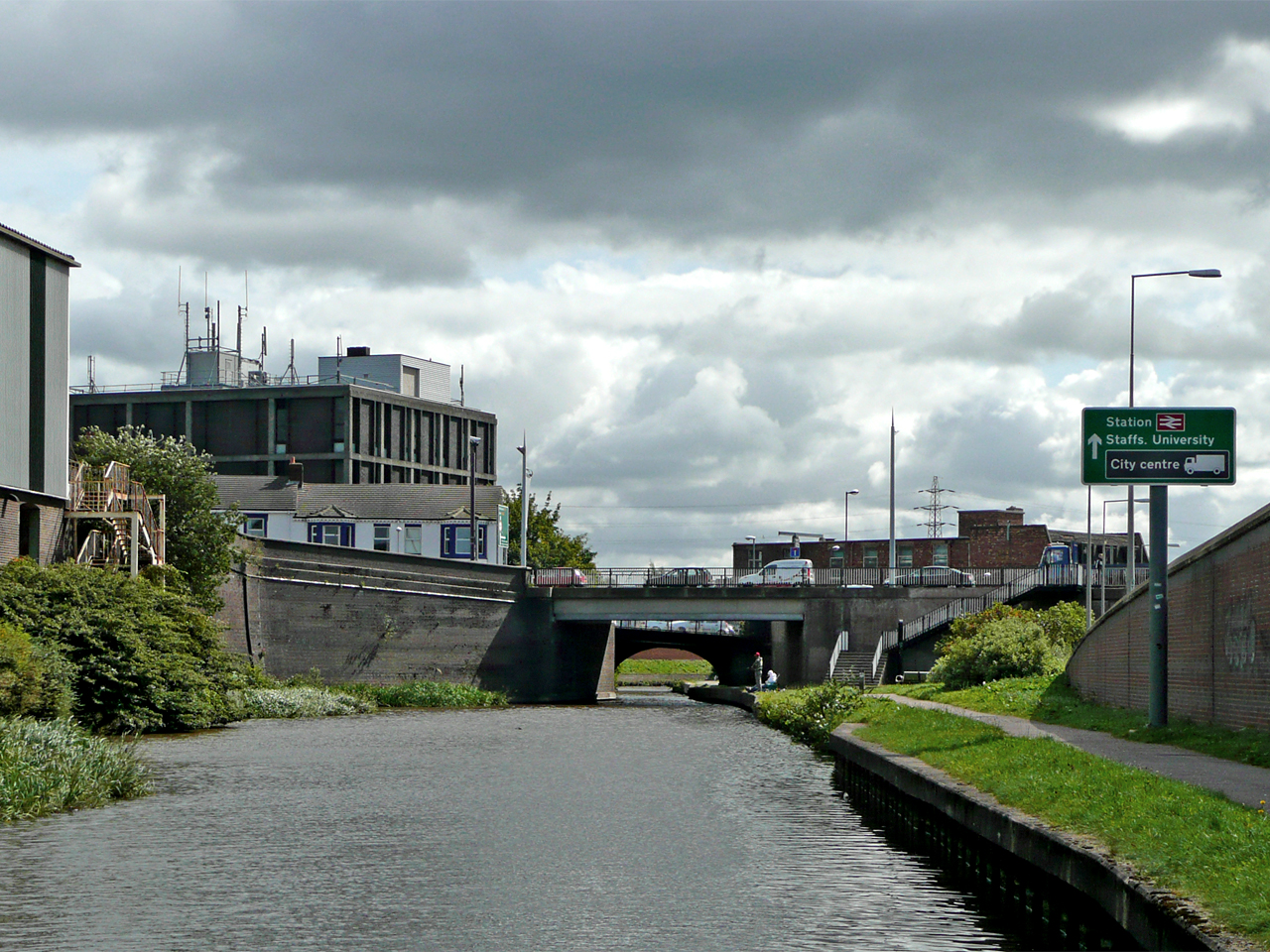
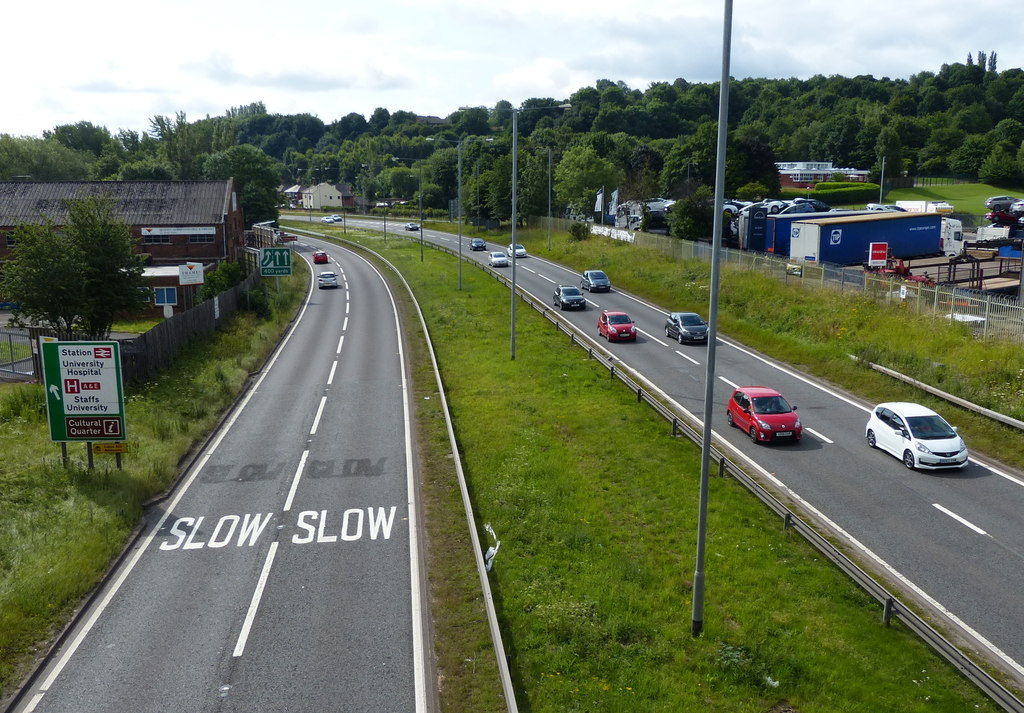
- Top:Stoke Old Town Hall; Upper: London Road and Minster Church; Lower: Elenora Street and Glebe Street Bridge; Bottom: Trent and Mersey Canal and Queensway

- Location within Staffordshire
- OS grid reference: SJ875455
- Unitary authority: Stoke-on-Trent
- Ceremonial county: Staffordshire
- Region: West Midlands
- Country: England
- Sovereign state: United Kingdom
- Districts of the town (2011 census BUASD): List: Boothen; Hartshill (part); Oakhill; Penkhull; Springfields; Trent Vale
- Post town: STOKE-ON-TRENT
- Postcode district: ST4
- Dialling code: 01782
- Police: Staffordshire
- Fire: Staffordshire
- Ambulance: West Midlands
- UK Parliament: Stoke-on-Trent Central

Stoke-upon-Trent, commonly known as Stoke, is one of the six towns that along with Hanley, Burslem, Fenton, Longton and Tunstall form the city of Stoke-on-Trent, in Staffordshire, England.

The town was incorporated as a municipal borough in 1874. In 1910 the six towns federated to become the County Borough of Stoke-on-Trent and later the City of Stoke-on-Trent. Since federation in 1910 it has been the seat of the city's council, although the city centre is regarded as being in nearby Hanley.

== Name ==
On 1 April 1910, the town was federated into the county borough of Stoke-on-Trent. On 1 April 1922 the parish was abolished and merged with Stoke on Trent. At the 1921 census (the last before the abolition of the parish), Stoke upon Trent had a population of 37,935. By 1925 the area was granted city status.

=== Renaming proposals ===
Owing to the confusion between the town of Stoke and the larger city, there have been various calls, mainly amongst business leaders and academics, to rename either the town or the larger city. Proposals for the renamed town include Old Stoke and Stoke Town. There are also proposals to rename part of Hanley to Stoke-on-Trent City Centre.

== Growth of Stoke and its transport links ==
Stoke was located where the upper reaches of the Trent meets the Fowlea Brook. The later Roman road through Stoke remained the basis for local road transport long after the Roman occupation.

The Anglian name given to this ancient place of meeting and worship was the 'stoc' (meeting place) on the Trent. It was the site of the first church in the area, built of wood around the year 670 by missionaries from Lindisfarne, later rebuilt in stone, and now known as Stoke Minster. A significant small town grew up around this church.

In the 18th century, the "Grand Trunk" canal came along the Trent valley to carry china clay from Cornwall cheaply to the Potteries (and pottery safely away). Many of the promoters of the canal were pottery magnates.

In the 19th century, the railways, too, came along the valley. The mainline Stoke-on-Trent railway station was opened by the North Staffordshire Railway (NSR) on 9 October 1848, replacing the temporary station sited at Whieldon Road which was constructed for the opening of the first NSR line on 17 April 1848. Travellers to the region would change trains at Stoke for local trains to their ticketed destination.

== King's Hall ==
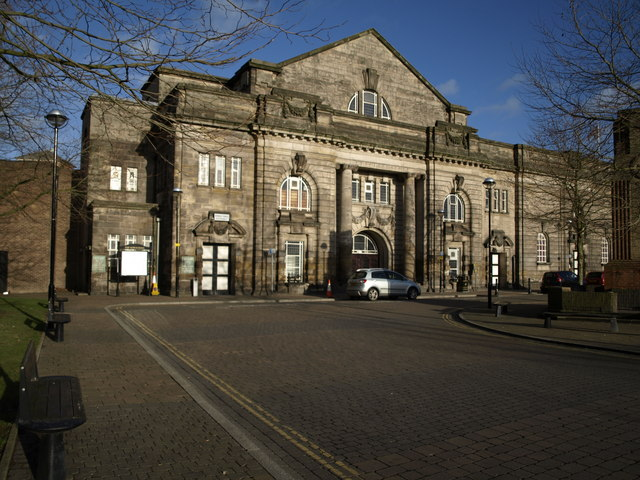
King's Hall, Stoke

The assembly hall, ballroom, exhibition hall and theatre built in 1910–11 at the time of the federation to the design of T. Wallis and J. A. Bowater, and with an impressive 19-bay dressed stone frontage on Kingsway behind the town hall. It has proved itself to be a useful adjunct to the town hall of 1834–50. This was built on Glebe Street, opposite the parish church to the design of Henry Ward. The entire Town Hall–King's Hall complex serves the city of Stoke-on-Trent well as its chief administrative offices, including the lord mayor's parlour combined with all the facilities of the King's Hall for the city's formal entertainment.

== Stoke Market ==
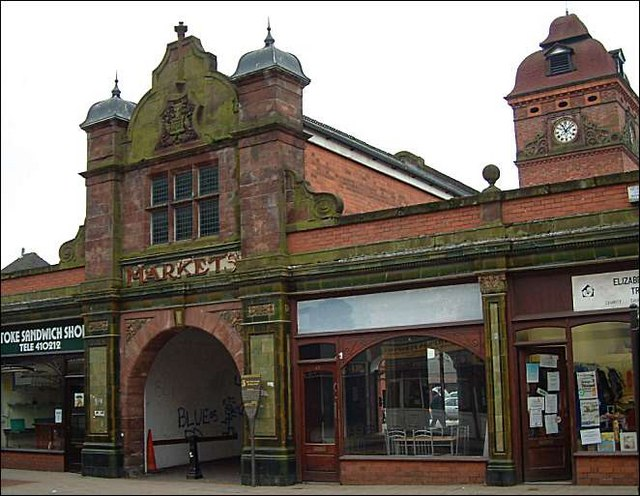
Stoke-upon-Trent market: part of the surviving frontage to Church Street.

Stoke has held markets in various locations in the town since 1818. A market was set up within the newly built town hall in the 1830s, but this did not prove popular with the market traders of the time and in 1845 the market moved to Hide Street (the building can still be seen today).

In 1883 the market relocated to a larger purpose-built building fronting Church Street 'befitting its town status'. This Victorian market was all but destroyed by a fire that started on FA Cup final day (22 May 1982). Only the clock tower, entrance arch, fish section and shop frontage was saved. The current market in South Wolfe Street was opened in 1984. The former market site with its clock tower was block paved for use as an outdoor trading/event space, and a library and one-stop shop has also been added to the site.

== The Potteries ==
In the 19th century, Stoke had a thriving pottery industry, hence its nickname, "The Potteries". Since the last half of the 20th century, however, almost all of the bottle-shaped kilns have been taken down, due to regulations from the Clean Air Act – an estimated 4,000 bottle kilns in the heyday of the pottery industry, today reduced to a mere 46. Successful Stoke-upon-Trent potters include Spode, Copeland, Minton and Biltons.
