= List of Stoke City F.C. players (25–99 appearances) =

Stoke City F.C. is an English association football club based in Stoke-on-Trent, Staffordshire. The club was formed in 1863 as Stoke Ramblers F.C., and played their first competitive match in November 1883, when they entered the First Round of the 1883–84 FA Cup. In 1888 they joined the inaugural Football League thus becoming founding members. The club was renamed Stoke City F.C. in 1925, and they moved to Britannia Stadium in 1997. Since playing their first competitive match, more than 1000 players have made a competitive first-team appearance for the club, many of whom have played between 25 and 99 matches (including substitute appearances); those players are listed here.

== List of players ==
- Appearances and goals are for first-team competitive matches only, including Premier League, Football League, Football Alliance, Birmingham & District League, Southern League, FA Cup, League Cup, League Trophy, UEFA Cup/UEFA Europa League, Anglo-Italian Cup, Birmingham League Cup, Full Members' Cup, United Counties League, Texaco Cup and Watney Cup. Wartime matches are regarded as unofficial and are excluded.
- The list is ordered first by number of appearances in total.
- Highlighted players members of the current squad.

Statistics correct as of match played 21 November 2026

Table headers

- Nationality – If a player played international football, the country/countries he played for are shown. Otherwise, the player's nationality is given as their country of birth.
- Stoke City career – The year of the player's first appearance for Stoke City to the year of his last appearance.
- Starts – The number of games started.
- Sub – The number of games played as a substitute.
- Total – The total number of games played, both as a starter and as a substitute.

Positions key
Pre-1960s		Post-1960s	
GK	Goalkeeper		
FB	Full back	DF	Defender
HB	Half back	MF	Midfielder
FW	Forward		
U	Utility player^{1}		

Name	Nationality	Position	Stoke City career	Starts	Subs	Total	Goals
Name	Nationality	Position	Stoke City career	Appearances			Goals
George Antonio	England	FW	1935–1946	98	0	98	15
Lawrie Leslie	Scotland	GK	1963–1965	97	0	97	0
Maurice Setters	England	HB	1965–1967	97	0	97	5
Ben Pearson	England	MF	2023–	72	25	97	1
Ian Clarkson	England	DF	1993–1996	91	5	96	0
George Clawley	England	GK	1894–1899	96	0	96	0
Carl Hoefkens	Belgium	DF	2005–2007	93	3	96	5
Bert Ralphs	England	MF	1922–1925	96	0	96	6
Ronnie Sinclair	Scotland	GK	1991–1996	94	2	96	0
Ally Pickering	England	DF	1996–1999	93	2	95	1
Sergei Shtanuk	Belarus	DF	2001–2003	95	0	95	5
Frank Whitehouse	England	FW	1900–1904	95	0	95	24
Junior Tchamadeu	Cameroon	DF	2023–	73	22	95	2
Vic Rouse	England	HB	1922–1925	94	0	94	2
Tony Ellis	England	FW	1989–1992	75	18	93	20
Joe Mawson	England	FW	1928–1933	93	0	93	50
Jackie Mudie	Scotland	FW	1961–1963	93	0	93	33
Leslie Johnston	Scotland	FW	1949–1953	92	0	92	22
Simon Sturridge	England	FW	1993–1999	56	36	92	15
Xherdan Shaqiri	Switzerland	FW	2015–2018	87	5	92	15
Harry Benson	England	FB	1901–1907	91	0	91	0
Howard Kendall	England	MF	1977–1979	91	0	91	10
Gifton Noel-Williams	England	FW	2003–2005	83	8	91	23
Viktor Johansson	Sweden	GK	2024–	91	0	91	0
Noel Blake	Jamaica	DF	1990–1992	87	3	90	3
Cyril Watkin	England	FB	1948–1952	90	0	90	0
Justin Whittle	England	DF	1994–1998	73	17	90	1
Tommy Broad	England	MF	1921–1924	89	0	89	4
Jermaine Pennant	England	MF	2010–2014	64	25	89	4
Danny Pugh	England	MF	2007–2012	52	37	89	3
Tom Wilkes	England	GK	1894–1897	89	0	89	0
Lee Dixon	England	DF	1986–1988	88	0	88	5
Peter Handyside	England	DF	2001–2003	88	0	88	1
Peter Hoekstra	Netherlands	MF	2001–2004	73	15	88	12
Geoff Scott	England	DF	1977–1980	86	2	88	3
Marcus Hall	England	FW	2002–2005	84	3	87	1
Joey Williams	England	FW	1926–1929	86	0	86	17
Sam Vokes	Wales	FW	2019–2021	39	47	86	12
Wouter Burger	Netherlands	MF	2023–2025	75	11	86	5
Harry Brough	England	HB	1922–1925	85	0	85	1
George Gallimore	England	FW	1903–1908	85	0	85	17
Bojan Krkić	Spain	FW	2014–2019	59	26	85	16
John Eustace	England	MF	2003–2008	63	21	84	6
Abdoulaye Faye	Senegal	DF	2008–2011	81	3	84	6
Jimmy Grewer	Scotland	DF	1894–1897	84	0	84	1
Gary Hackett	England	MF	1987–1989	73	11	84	7
Mikael Hansson	Sweden	DF	1999–2001	84	0	84	3
Clint Hill	England	DF	2003–2008	75	9	84	3
Richard Cresswell	England	FW	2007–2010	61	22	83	13
Chris Greenacre	England	FW	2002–2005	51	32	83	9
Dick Johnson	England	FW	1925–1928	83	0	83	25
Ashley Phillips	England	DF	2024–2026	79	4	83	1
Neil Cutler	England	GK	2001–2004	77	5	82	0
Lewis Neal	England	MF	2000–2005	35	47	82	3
Steven Fletcher	Scotland	FW	2020–2022	46	36	82	12
Paul Peschisolido	Canada	FW	1994–1996	73	8	81	24
John Cull	England	FW	1925–1930	80	0	80	9
James Hay	Scotland	MF	1909–1911	80	0	80	1
Josh Laurent	England	MF	2022–2024	67	13	80	8
Charlie Parker	England	DF	1914–1920	79	0	79	5
Eric Bocat	France	DF	2024–	60	19	79	2
Ernie Millward	England	MF	1908–1910	78	0	78	25
Dave Regis	England	FW	1992–1994	62	16	78	20
Morgan Fox	Wales	DF	2020–2023	72	6	78	0
Sammy Irvine	Scotland	MF	1978–1980	77	0	77	13
Tom Kay	England	GK	1919–1921	77	0	77	0
Bert Gadsden	England	GK	1912–1915	76	0	76	0
Roy John	Wales	MF	1932–1934	76	0	76	0
Mike Sheron	England	FW	1995–1997	71	5	76	39
Carl Asaba	England	FW	2003–2005	44	31	75	10
Tatsuki Seko	Japan	MF	2024–2026	52	23	75	0
Roy Brown	England	U	1946–1953	74	0	74	14
John Halls	England	DF	2003–2006	72	2	74	2
Peter Jackson	England	HB	1924–1931	74	0	74	1
David Oldfield	Australia	MF	1998–2000	57	17	74	7
Tom Revill	England	FW	1910–1914	74	0	74	24
George Kelly	Scotland	FW	1955–1958	73	0	73	37
Tony A.O. Kelly	England	FW	1989–1993	41	32	73	8
Arthur Lockett	England	FW	1900–1903	73	0	73	7
Fred Rouse	England	FW	1903–1906	73	0	73	26
Billy Dunn	Scotland	FW	1889–1892	72	0	72	21
Phil Robinson	England	MF	1998–2000	61	10	72	2
Marc Goodfellow	England	FW	2000–2004	25	46	71	9
Chris Kamara	England	DF	1988–1990	71	0	71	7
Eddie Stuart	South Africa	DF	1962–1964	71	0	71	2
James Chester	Wales	DF	2020–2022	67	4	71	0
Tony Henry	England	MF	1987–1989	67	3	70	11
Jack Kennedy	Scotland	FW	1897–1900	70	0	70	12
Harry Leigh	England	HB	1909–1911	70	0	70	14
Ryan Shotton	England	DF	2008–2015	51	19	70	3
Stephen Ireland	Republic of Ireland	MF	2013–2018	34	36	70	6
Harry Souttar	Australia	DF	2017–2023	69	1	70	2
Alf Edge	England	FW	1884–1893	69	0	69	28
Jimmie Robertson	Scotland	FW	1892–1895	68	0	68	21
Dean Crowe	England	FW	1996–2001	33	34	67	13
Billy Herbert	England	FW	1912–1919	67	0	67	28
Cameron Jerome	England	FW	2011–2014	25	42	67	12
Jack Robinson	England	GK	1909–1912	67	0	67	0
Marc Muniesa	Spain	DF	2013–2017	49	18	67	3
Ade Akinbiyi	Nigeria	FW	2003–2005	58	8	66	19
Michael Rose	Scotland	DF	2023–2025	54	12	66	2
Arthur Capes	England	FW	1901–1904	65	0	65	20
Mark Devlin	Scotland	MF	1990–1997	47	18	65	2
Peter Durber	England	DF	1896–1901	65	0	65	0
Jack Eyres	England	FW	1922–1928	65	0	65	23
Mick Kennedy	Republic of Ireland	MF	1990–1992	64	1	65	3
Edward Parsons	England	HB	1897–1900	65	0	65	1
Ben Petty	England	DF	1999–2001	40	25	65	1
Stefan Thordarson	Iceland	FW	2000–2002	28	37	65	11
Jack Bonham	Republic of Ireland	GK	2021–2026	64	1	65	0
Lee Fowler	England	DF	1987–1992	55	9	64	0
Peter Griffiths	England	MF	1980–1984	46	17	64	5
Jack Short	England	DF	1954–1956	64	0	64	2
Brian Talbot	England	MF	1986–1988	61	3	64	7
David Watson	England	DF	1982–1983	64	0	64	6
James Westland	Scotland	FW	1935–1938	64	0	64	16
Glen Johnson	England	DF	2015–2018	60	4	64	0
Ewart Beswick	England	DF	1921–1926	63	0	63	2
Bill Capewell	England	HB	1895–1902	63	0	63	0
Ted Evans	England	FW	1891–1894	63	0	63	19
Stewart Jump	England	DF	1970–1973	55	8	63	2
Jack Miller	England	MF	1905–1907	63	0	63	5
Jimmy Turner	England	MF	1894–1900	63	0	63	1
Phil Bardsley	Scotland	DF	2014–2017	59	5	63	5
Eddie Clamp	England	HB	1962–1964	62	0	62	2
Bill Finney	England	FW	1952–1955	62	0	62	15
Arthur Rowley	England	HB	1896–1899	62	0	62	0
Ki-Jana Hoever	Netherlands	DF	2023–2024	51	10	61	8
Peter Beagrie	England	MF	1988–1989	61	0	61	8
Derrick Ward	England	FW	1952–1961	61	0	61	9
Dick Williams	England	GK	1926–1929	61	0	61	0
Viv Busby	England	FW	1977–1980	38	22	60	12
Scott Barrett	England	GK	1987–1990	60	0	60	0
Danny Collins	Wales	DF	2009–2012	52	8	60	0
Carl Dickinson	England	DF	2004–2011	39	21	60	0
John Dreyer	England	DF	1994–1996	42	18	60	4
Paul A. Johnson	England	MF	1975–1982	54	6	60	0
Gerry McMahon	Northern Ireland	MF	1996–1998	44	16	60	3
Joe Turner	England	FW	1898–1900	60	0	60	15
Jurgen Vandeurzen	Belgium	MF	2001–2003	49	11	60	5
Andy Clark	Scotland	FB	1901–1903	59	0	59	0
David McAughtrie	Scotland	DF	1980–1984	56	3	59	3
Brian Siddall	England	MF	1950–1953	59	0	59	10
Wilmot Turner	England	FW	1890–1892	59	0	59	22
Ed de Goey	Netherlands	GK	2003–2006	56	2	58	0
Graham Potter	England	DF	1993–1996	53	5	58	1
Wilf Hall	England	GK	1954–1960	57	0	57	0
Ian Moores	England	FW	1974–1976	46	11	57	16
Dai Nicholas	Wales	MF	1921–1924	57	0	57	4
Harry Ware	England	FW	1930–1934	57	0	57	15
Arthur Hartshorne	England	FB	1903–1905	56	0	56	0
Tommy Howe	England	DF	1921–1925	56	0	56	2
Robbie James	Wales	MF	1983–1984	56	0	56	7
Joe Murphy	England	FW	1897–1899	56	0	56	2
Jack Proctor	England	DF	1891–1893	56	0	56	1
Gerry Taggart	Northern Ireland	DF	2003–2006	56	0	56	5
Steve Waddington	England	MF	1976–1979	53	3	56	6
Philipp Wollscheid	Germany	DF	2015–2017	55	1	56	0
Saido Berahino	Burundi	FW	2017–2019	31	25	56	5
Luke Chadwick	England	MF	2005–2007	50	5	55	6
Jack Hall	England	FW	1904–1906	55	0	55	18
Harold Hardman	England	FW	1911–1913	55	0	55	10
Joe Kasher	England	DF	1922–1923	55	0	55	1
Kevin Russell	England	FW	1992–1993	44	11	55	7
Tuncay	Turkey	FW	2009–2011	26	29	55	8
Ibrahim Afellay	Netherlands	MF	2015–2019	34	21	55	3
Bill Bentley	England	DF	1964–1968	49	4	53	2
Leon Cort	England	DF	2007–2010	50	3	53	8
Wilson Palacios	Honduras	MF	2011–2015	28	25	53	0
Bryan Small	England	DF	1998–2001	47	5	53	0
Bill Winstanley	England	DF	1935–1938	53	0	53	0
Josef Bursik	England	GK	2020–2023	53	0	53	0
Lynden Gooch	United States	DF	2023–2025	32	21	53	2
David Brown	Scotland	FW	1919–1921	52	0	52	17
Wally McReddie	Scotland	FW	1889–1894	52	0	52	14
Alan Philpott	England	MF	1960–1968	47	5	52	2
Albert Pitt	England	HB	1903–1912	52	0	52	5
George Smart	England	DF	1911–1920	52	0	52	0
Lewis Ballham	England	FW	1890–1892	52	0	52	15
Sorba Thomas	Wales	MF	2025–2026	51	1	52	10
Tony Bentley	England	MF	1958–1961	51	0	51	15
Wilf Kirkham	England	FW	1929–1931	51	0	51	30
Paul Randall	England	FW	1978–1980	41	10	51	8
Peter Etebo	Nigeria	MF	2018–2022	40	11	51	2
Tom Edwards	England	DF	2017–2024	46	5	51	1
Benik Afobe	DR Congo	FW	2018–2022	38	13	51	9
Sam Gallagher	England	FW	2024–	18	33	51	7
Bosun Lawal	Republic of Ireland	MF	2024–	40	11	51	1
Billy Leech	England	HB	1900–1901	50	0	50	2
Sam Meredith	Wales	DF	1901–1904	50	0	50	0
Lee Gregory	England	FW	2019–2021	29	21	50	7
Phil Jagielka	England	DF	2022–2023	48	2	50	2
Dwight Gayle	England	FW	2022–2024	36	14	50	3
Dave Bamber	England	FW	1988–1989	49	0	49	11
Rikhardur Dadason	Iceland	FW	2000–2002	22	27	49	12
Tommy Hyslop	Scotland	FW	1894–1895	49	0	49	30
Derek Statham	England	DF	1989–1991	49	0	49	1
Lewis Koumas	Wales	MF	2024–2025	31	16	49	6
Arthur Arrowsmith	England	FW	1906–1907	48	0	48	9
Peter Bullock	England	FW	1958–1962	48	0	48	16
Paul Connor	England	FW	1999–2001	23	25	48	10
Cecil Eastwood	England	DF	1926–1927	48	0	48	0
David Herd	Scotland	FW	1968–1970	43	5	48	11
Paul Gallagher	Scotland	FW	2005–2008	37	10	47	12
Jack Peart	England	FW	1909–1912	47	0	47	41
Bob Ramsay	England	FB	1888–1890	47	0	47	5
Steven Tweed	Scotland	DF	1997–1998	42	5	47	0
Nathan Collins	Republic of Ireland	DF	2019–2021	33	14	47	2
Danny Bowers	England	DF	1974–1978	41	5	46	2
Jack Challinor	England	FB	1937–1938	46	0	46	0
Kris Commons	Scotland	MF	2001–2004	22	24	46	5
Frederick Groves	England	FW	1921–1922	46	0	46	13
Richard Herron	England	GK	1910–1915	46	0	46	0
Mark Higgins	England	DF	1988–1989	44	2	46	1
Terry Ward	England	DF	1959–1963	46	0	46	0
Will Smallbone	Republic of Ireland	MF	2022–2023	40	6	46	3
Arthur Cartlidge	England	GK	1899–1912	45	0	45	0
Ellis Hall	England	DF	1909–1910	45	0	45	4
Neil MacKenzie	England	MF	1996–2001	16	29	45	1
Derek Parkin	England	DF	1982–1983	45	0	45	0
Vincent Péricard	France	FW	2006–2009	26	19	45	4
Ramadan Sobhi	Egypt	MF	2016–2018	24	21	45	3
Jordan Cousins	England	MF	2019–2021	27	18	45	0
Lamine Cissé	France	MF	2025–	28	17	45	5
Archie Dyke	England	MF	1909–1914	44	0	44	3
Ted Holdcroft	England	HB	1903–1905	44	0	44	11
Anders Jacobsen	Norway	DF	1999–2000	39	5	44	2
Tony A.G. Kelly	England	MF	1984–1986	41	3	44	4
Frode Kippe	Norway	DF	1999–2001	40	4	44	1
Mick Mills	England	DF	1985–1987	44	0	44	0
Sammy Smyth	Northern Ireland	FW	1951–1953	44	0	44	19
Loek Ursem	Netherlands	MF	1978–1982	36	8	44	7
Jackie Chalmers	Scotland	FW	1905–1907	43	0	43	19
Ezekiel Johnston	Ireland	GK	1896–1898	43	0	43	0
André Vidigal	Angola	MF	2023–2026	20	23	43	7
Marlon Broomes	England	DF	2005–2008	41	1	42	2
Jack Farrell	England	FW	1894–1899	42	0	42	12
Andy Graver	England	FW	1955–1957	42	0	42	14
Tommy Thompson	England	FW	1961–1963	42	0	42	18
Darren Fletcher	Scotland	MF	2017–2019	32	10	42	2
Enda Stevens	Republic of Ireland	MF	2023–2025	33	9	42	0
Tony Dorigo	England	DF	2000–2001	39	2	41	0
Harry Meakin	England	FB	1946–1950	41	0	41	0
Chris Short	England	DF	1998–2000	38	3	41	0
Peter Sweeney	Scotland	MF	2005–2008	22	19	41	2
Mikel John Obi	Nigeria	MF	2020–2021	38	3	41	0
Adam Davies	Wales	GK	2019–2022	41	0	41	0
Luke McNally	Republic of Ireland	DF	2023–2024	37	4	41	2
Ben Gibson	England	DF	2024–	32	9	41	4
James Beattie	England	FW	2008–2010	29	11	40	10
Sam Johnson	England	DF	1924–1926	40	0	40	0
Dave Kitson	England	FW	2008–2010	23	17	40	5
Steve Woods	England	DF	1994–1999	39	1	40	0
Neil Adams	England	MF	1985–1986	38	1	39	4
Samuel Ashworth	England	DF	1901–1903	39	0	39	0
Arthur Box	England	GK	1907–1909	39	0	39	0
Jon Parkin	England	FW	2007–2008	12	27	39	6
Ryan Woods	England	MF	2018–2021	38	1	39	0
Andrew Moran	Republic of Ireland	MF	2024–2025	29	10	39	4
Charles Baker	England	FW	1889–1894	38	0	38	13
Tom Coxon	England	FB	1993–1994	38	0	38	6
Henry Hargreaves	England	MF	1912–1915	38	0	38	4
Ian Scott	England	MF	1989–1992	28	10	38	2
Jack Whitley	England	GK	1904–1905	38	0	38	1
Róbert Boženík	Slovakia	FW	2025–	16	22	38	4
Lloyd Davies	Wales	FB	1903–1907	37	0	37	3
Harry Hutsby	England	DF	1908–1910	37	0	37	0
Joe Hutton	Scotland	FW	1953–1957	37	0	37	8
John Lenaghan	England	FW	1911–1913	37	0	37	10
Alan Maxwell	Scotland	FW	1895–1896	37	0	37	6
Billy Twemlow	England	FB	1919–1921	37	0	37	2
Kurt Zouma	France	DF	2017–2018	36	1	37	1
Ashley Williams	Wales	DF	2018–2019	31	6	37	1
Oussama Assaidi	Morocco	MF	2013–2015	18	18	36	5
John Walker	England	HB	1924–1925	36	0	36	1
Donald Whiston	England	MF	1949–1956	36	0	36	5
Tom Bailey	England	HB	1912–1915	35	0	35	1
Kenny Campbell	Scotland	GK	1923–1925	35	0	35	0
Joe Clennell	England	FW	1925–1926	35	0	35	9
Jimmy Hill	Scotland	FW	1897–1898	35	0	35	13
Jimmy McAlinden	Northern Ireland	FW	1947–1948	35	0	35	2
Harry Mellor	England	FW	1897–1899	35	0	35	4
Lee Grant	England	GK	2016–2018	35	0	35	0
Mario Vrančić	Bosnia and Herzegovina	MF	2021–2022	25	10	35	3
Hughie Clifford	Scotland	HB	1890–1893	34	0	34	2
Jeff Cook	England	FW	1977–1981	25	9	34	7
Paul Johnson	England	DF	1977–1981	33	1	34	0
Mike Macari	Scotland	FW	1996–1997	15	19	34	3
Iain Munro	Scotland	MF	1980–1981	34	0	34	1
Doug Newlands	Scotland	MF	1959–1960	34	0	34	8
Henrik Risom	Denmark	DF	2000–2001	16	18	34	0
Simon Stainrod	England	FW	1987–1988	33	1	34	7
John Gayle	England	FW	1995–1997	19	14	33	4
Charles Hallam	England	FW	1924–1926	33	0	33	2
George Jarvis	Scotland	FW	1919–1920	33	0	33	10
Dick Smith	England	FW	1913–1915	33	0	33	21
Elijah Smith	England	HB	1883–1890	33	0	33	0
Louis Williams	England	DF	1907–1908	33	0	33	1
Mehdi Léris	Algeria	MF	2023–2024	21	12	33	3
Arthur Jepson	England	GK	1946–1948	32	0	32	0
Fred Rathbone	England	GK	1907–1911	32	0	32	0
Eric Maxim Choupo-Moting	Cameroon	FW	2017–2018	27	5	32	5
William Bradbury	England	HB	1910–1911	31	0	31	0
William Cope	England	FB	1907–1908	31	0	31	0
Harry Crossthwaite	England	HB	1920–1921	31	0	31	0
William Davies	England	FW	1907–1909	31	0	31	16
Bobby Irvine	Northern Ireland	GK	1963–1966	31	0	31	0
Alec McClure	England	DF	1980–1984	31	0	31	0
John Shirley	England	FW	1927–1929	31	0	31	11
John Tudor	England	FW	1976–1977	29	2	31	3
Peter Odemwingie	Nigeria	FW	2014–2016	19	12	31	5
Ryan Mmaee	Morocco	FW	2023–2025	21	10	31	5
Daniel Johnson	Jamaica	MF	2023–2024	22	9	31	2
Paul Barnes	England	FW	1990–1992	13	17	30	5
Gerry Daly	Republic of Ireland	MF	1987–1988	25	5	30	3
Kevin Harper	Scotland	MF	2005–2007	16	14	30	1
Tommy Kiernan	Scotland	FW	1947–1948	30	0	30	7
George Shutt	England	HB	1883–1889	30	0	30	2
Maksym Talovierov	Ukraine	DF	2025–	21	9	30	0
Sambégou Bangoura	Guinea	FW	2005–2007	25	4	29	9
Freddie Brown	England	FW	1906–1907	29	0	29	11
Ernest Hodkin	England	HB	1911–1913	29	0	29	1
Jimmy Jones	England	FW	1899–1900	29	0	29	9
Hannes Sigurðsson	Iceland	FW	2005–2006	10	19	29	1
Gabriel Zakuani	DR Congo	DF	2006–2008	21	8	29	0
Jack Tennant	England	DF	1930–1939	29	0	29	0
Romaine Sawyers	Saint Kitts and Nevis	MF	2021–2022	24	5	29	3
Dave Goodwin	England	FW	1973–1977	24	4	28	3
Graham Harbey	England	DF	1992–1993	26	2	28	0
Lee Hendrie	England	MF	1903–1905	26	2	28	3
Charles Kelly	England	FW	1923–1925	28	0	28	5
Percy Knott	England	GK	1920–1925	28	0	28	0
John Lumsdon	England	DF	1975–1978	26	2	28	0
Keith Scott	England	FW	1994–1995	24	4	28	4
Giannelli Imbula	France	MF	2016–2020	26	2	28	2
Dujon Sterling	England	DF	2022–2023	26	2	28	0
Divin Mubama	England	FW	2025–2026	21	7	28	5
Terry Lees	England	MF	1969–1973	19	8	27	0
John Cunliffe	England	MF	1959–1960	27	0	27	3
Billy McIntosh	Scotland	FW	1951–1953	27	0	27	6
Jimmy McColl	Scotland	FW	1920–1921	27	0	27	5
Matthew Upson	England	DF	2011–2013	25	2	27	3
Joselu	Spain	FW	2015–2017	13	14	27	4
Badou Ndiaye	Senegal	MF	2018–2021	25	2	27	2
Nathan Lowe	England	FW	2023–	8	19	27	2
Michael Kightly	England	MF	2012–2014	18	8	26	3
Harold Taylor	England	FW	1929–1931	26	0	26	11
Moritz Bauer	Austria	DF	2018–2021	24	2	26	0
Niall Ennis	England	FW	2024–2025	9	17	26	2
Aaron Cresswell	England	DF	2025–	22	4	26	0
David Gregory	England	FW	1977–1978	24	1	25	4
John McGillivray	England	HB	1911–1912	25	0	25	0
Dominic Matteo	Scotland	DF	2006–2009	24	1	25	1
Clement Smith	England	MF	1937–1939	25	0	25	7
Paul Stewart	England	FW	1997–1998	25	0	25	3
Fred Tomlinson	England	FW	1909–1910	25	0	25	4
Tom Cannon	Republic of Ireland	FW	2024–2025	24	1	25	11

== Notes ==
- A utility player is one who is considered to play in more than one position.
