= Billy Tompkinson =

English footballer

Personal information
- Full name: William Vincent Tompkinson
- Date of birth: 18 June 1895
- Place of birth: Stone, England
- Date of death: 1968 (aged 73)
- Height: 5 ft 6 in (1.68 m)
- Position: Outside right

Youth career
- 1910–1913: Wolverhampton Wanderers

Senior career*
Years	Team	Apps	(Gls)
1914	Wolverhampton Wanderers	0	(0)
1915–1919	Stoke	2	(0)
1921–1922	Aberdare Athletic	41	(4)
1923–1927	Rochdale	162	(45)
1928–1929	Stockport County	76	(26)
1929–1930	Connah's Quay & Shotton United		
1930–1931	Macclesfield	21	(8)
Total		302	(83)
- * Club domestic league appearances and goals

William Vincent Tompkinson (18 June 1895 – 1968) was an English footballer who played in the Football League for Aberdare Athletic, Rochdale, Stockport County and Stoke.

== Career ==
Tompkinson was born in Stone, Staffordshire and started his career at First Division side Wolverhampton Wanderers whilst he was a regular for their reserve side he never was able to break into the first team and left in 1915 to join Stoke. The "Potters" were playing in the Southern Football League Division Two at the time and were well on their way to claiming the title. Due to the goalscoring form of Arthur Watkin, and the two Smith's Alf and Dick, Tompkinson only managed one appearance during the 1914–15 season which came in a 4–2 win away at Welsh side Mid Rhondda in April 1915. Due to the outbreak of World War I, Stoke entered war league football and Tompkinson joined the British Army, he returned to the club in 1919. He was again unable to break into Stoke's first team and made just one more appearance in a 1–0 defeat away at Bury in February 1920.

He was released by Stoke at the end of the season and joined new Welsh side Aberdare Athletic in 1921. At Aberdare Tompkinson was able to play regular football and managed to make 41 appearances during the 1921–22 season. He joined Rochdale in 1923 and stayed at Dale for four years making 162 league appearances and scoring 45 goals. He finished his career at Stockport County and then at Connah's Quay & Shotton United and finally Macclesfield.

== Career statistics ==
Appearances and goals by club, season and competition
Club	Season	League			FA Cup		Total	
Club	Season	Division	Apps	Goals	Apps	Goals	Apps	Goals
Stoke	1914–15	Southern League Division Two	1	0	0	0	1	0
Stoke	1919–20	Second Division	1	0	0	0	1	0
Stoke	Total		2	0	0	0	2	0
Aberdare Athletic	1921–22	Third Division South	26	4	0	0	26	4
Aberdare Athletic	1922–23	Third Division South	15	0	5	0	20	0
Aberdare Athletic	Total		41	4	5	0	46	4
Rochdale	1923–24	Third Division North	38	6	2	0	40	6
Rochdale	1924–25	Third Division North	36	11	2	0	38	11
Rochdale	1925–26	Third Division North	16	8	0	0	16	8
Rochdale	1926–27	Third Division North	34	9	0	0	34	9
Rochdale	1927–28	Third Division North	38	11	2	0	40	11
Rochdale	Total		162	45	6	0	168	45
Stockport County	1928–29	Third Division North	39	14	3	0	42	14
Stockport County	1929–30	Third Division North	37	12	3	1	40	13
Stockport County	Total		76	26	6	1	82	27
Macclesfield	1930–31	Cheshire League	21	8	0	0	21	8
Career total			302	83	17	1	319	84
