= Hodkin =

Hodkin is a surname. Notable people with the surname include:

- Ernest Hodkin (1890–1967), English football player
- Michelle Hodkin (born 1982), American author

== See also ==
- Hodgkin
