= 1914–15 Stoke F.C. season =

Stoke
1914–15 season
- Chairman: Mr E. Reynish
- Manager: Peter Hodge
- Stadium: Victoria Ground
- Southern League Division Two: 1st (38 points)
- FA Cup: Third Qualifying Round
- Top goalscorer: League: Arthur Watkin (24); All: Arthur Watkin (31)
- Highest home attendance: 8,000 vs Brentford (25 December 1914)
- Lowest home attendance: 3,000 vs Swansea Town (17 September 1914)
- Average home league attendance: 4,625
Home colours	Away colours

The 1914–15 season was Stoke's sixth and final season in the Southern Football League.

After the resignation of chairman Hurst and manager Alfred Barker, the board elected Mr E. Reynish as the new chairman and brought in Scotsman Peter Hodge as the club's new manager. With war on the horizon, there was debate as to whether football should be cancelled; it was not, but a number of clubs in the Southern League Division Two withdrew, claiming it to be 'unpatriotic'. Stoke had a good season and won the division with 38 points, which prompted the club to seek re-election to the Football League. They were successful in their efforts and after seven seasons Stoke could finally reclaim their place in the Football League. However, at the end of the season the league was indeed cancelled due to the war and Stoke would have to wait until 1919 to play league football.

== Season review ==
=== League ===
The 1914–15 season opened up against the backdrop of World War I and there was a lot of debate to whether the football should continue. The season started but after a number of games several clubs resigned from the Southern League claiming it to be unpatriotic. These teams were Abertillery, Caerphilly, Leyton and Mardy. Their records were expunged and results against these clubs were void.

Stoke, now under the management of 39-year-old Peter Hodge the former boss of Raith Rovers, led the Division from virtually from the start. There was a familiar feeling to the squad with Dick Hope and Fred McCarthy the only players to come from outside the local area. Two departures in 1914 were William Smith whose long term leg injury got the better of him and skipper Ernest Mullineux. An impressive start was made to the 1914–15 season and a draw against Brentford on Christmas Day was only the third point Stoke had dropped. Stoke went on to comfortably claim the league title. There was also the emergence of Arthur Watkin who top scored with 24 league goals.

Stoke's success prompted them to apply for election to the Football League at the annual general meeting held on 19 July 1915. The bottom two clubs Leicester Fosse and Glossop North End, were obliged to seek re-election, but Glossop only secured one vote, while Stoke took 21 and saw them duly re-instated in the league. Later on in the meeting it was also announced that the League would be cancelled due to World War I and Stoke would have to wait longer to re-claim their place in the Football League.

=== FA Cup ===
Stoke recorded their largest FA Cup victory this season an 11–0 victory over Stourbridge albeit in the preliminary round. Stoke went on to beat Birmingham Corporation Tramways and Brierley Hill Alliance before losing to Walsall.

== Final league table ==
Pos	Team	Pld	W	D	L	GF	GA	GAv	Pts
1	Stoke	24	17	4	3	62	15	4.133	38
2	Stalybridge Celtic	24	17	3	4	47	22	2.136	37
3	Merthyr Town	24	15	5	4	46	20	2.300	35
4	Swansea Town	24	16	1	7	48	21	2.286	33
5	Coventry City	24	13	2	9	56	33	1.697	28
6	Ton Pentre	24	11	6	7	42	43	0.977	28
7	Brentford	24	8	7	9	35	45	0.778	23
8	Llanelly	24	10	1	13	39	32	1.219	21
9	Barry	24	6	5	13	30	35	0.857	17
10	Newport County	24	7	3	14	27	42	0.643	17
11	Ponytpridd	24	5	6	13	31	58	0.534	16
12	Mid Rhondda	24	3	6	15	17	49	0.347	12
13	Ebbw Vale	24	3	1	20	23	88	0.261	7

== Results ==
Stoke's score comes first

=== Legend ===
Win	Draw	Loss

=== Southern Football League Division Two ===
Match	Date	Opponent	Venue	Result	Attendance	Scorers
1	12 September 1914	Coventry City	A	3–1	2,000	McCarthy, Herbert, Hargreaves
2	17 September 1914	Swansea Town	H	1–0	3,000	McCarthy
3	19 September 1914	Ebbw Vale	A	1–0	2,000	Hargreaves
4	22 September 1914	Barry	H	2–0	5,000	Tempest, Jones
5	3 October 1914	Ton Pentre	H	4–1	5,000	McCarthy, Parker, Watkin (2)
6	17 October 1914	Stalybridge Celtic	A	0–1	4,000	
7	21 October 1914	Merthyr Town	H	4–0	5,000	McCarthy, Herbert, Tempest, Bradley
8	14 November 1914	Llanelli	H	3–1	4,000	Watkin (3)
9	21 November 1914	Pontypridd	A	1–0	2,000	Watkin
10	28 November 1914	Mid Rhondda	H	8–0	4,000	Watkin (3), A Smith, Tempest, D Smith (2), Holmes (o.g.)
11	5 December 1914	Newport County	A	1–0	3,000	Watkin
12	12 December 1914	Pontypridd	H	5–0	4,000	Watkin (2), D Smith (2), Murray (o.g.)
13	25 December 1914	Brentford	A	2–2	3,000	D Smith (2)
14	26 December 1914	Brentford	H	3–0	8,000	Jones, A Smith, Watkin
15	9 January 1915	Newport County	H	3–1	3,500	Watkin, Tempest, Hargreaves
16	16 January 1915	Coventry City	H	5–1	5,000	Watkin (3), Tempest, A Smith
17	23 January 1915	Barry	A	0–0	2,000	
18	6 February 1915	Ton Pentre	A	1–0	1,000	D Smith
19	6 March 1915	Merthyr Town	A	0–0	3,000	
20	13 March 1915	Stalybridge Celtic	H	1–1	6,000	Watkin
21	20 March 1915	Llanelli	A	2–1	2,000	Watkin, Jones
22	3 April 1915	Mid Rhondda	A	2–4	1,000	D Smith (2)
23	5 April 1915	Ebbw Vale	H	10–0	3,000	D Smith, A Smith (4), Watkin (5)
24	24 April 1915	Swansea Town	A	0–1	4,000	

=== FA Cup ===
Round	Date	Opponent	Venue	Result	Attendance	Scorers
PR	26 September 1914	Stourbridge	H	11–0	1,500	Herbert (2), Watkin (5), Hargreaves, McCarthy (3)
1QR	10 October 1914	Birmingham Corporation Tramways	A	3–2	1,000	Parker, Watkin (2)
2QR	24 October 1914	Brierley Hill Alliance	H	1–0	2,000	McCarthy
3QR	7 November 1914	Walsall	A	0–1	3,500	

== Squad statistics ==
Pos.	Name	League		FA Cup		Total	
Pos.	Name	Apps	Goals	Apps	Goals	Apps	Goals
GK	(England) Bert Gadsden	6	0	2	0	8	0
GK	(England) Richard Herron	18	0	2	0	20	0
DF	(England) Alec Milne	24	0	4	0	28	0
DF	(England) George Turner	24	1	4	0	28	1
MF	(England) Sam Baddeley	1	0	1	0	2	0
MF	(England) James Bradley	18	1	4	0	22	1
MF	(Wales) Joe Jones	24	3	3	0	27	3
MF	(England) Charlie Parker	22	1	4	1	26	2
MF	(England) Stan Ripley	1	0	0	0	1	0
FW	(England) Tom Bailey	6	0	0	0	6	0
FW	(England) Reg Forester	0	0	1	0	1	0
FW	(England) Henry Hargreaves	23	4	4	1	27	5
FW	(Scotland) Dick Hope	2	0	0	0	2	0
FW	(England) Billy Herbert	7	2	4	2	11	4
FW	(England) Fred McCarthy	7	5	3	4	10	9
FW	(England) Alf Smith	18	7	0	0	18	7
FW	(England) Dick Smith	17	10	0	0	17	10
FW	(England) Billy Tempest	24	6	4	0	28	6
FW	(England) Billy Tompkinson	1	0	0	0	1	0
FW	(England) Arthur Watkin	20	24	4	7	24	31
–	Own goals	–	2	–	0	–	2
