= Fred McCarthy =

Fred McCarthy may refer to:

- Fred McCarthy (cartoonist) (1918–2009), American cartoonist
- Fred McCarthy (footballer) (1890–?), English footballer
- Frederick McCarthy (1881–1974), Canadian Olympic cyclist
- Fred McCarthy (archaeologist) (1905–1997), Australian archaeologist and anthropologist
