= 1911–12 Stoke F.C. season =

Stoke
1911–12 season
- Chairman: Mr Rev. A Hurst
- Manager: Alfred Barker
- Stadium: Victoria Ground
- Southern League Division One: 10th (36 points)
- FA Cup: Qualifying Round Five
- Top goalscorer: League: William Smith (9); All: William Smith (10)
- Highest home attendance: 18,000 vs Brighton & Hove Albion (2 September 1911)
- Lowest home attendance: 4,000 vs New Brompton (16 March 1912)
- Average home league attendance: 8,789
Home colours

The 1911–12 season was Stoke's third season in the Southern Football League.

Stoke now having left the Birmingham & District League to concentrate on the Southern League Division One, which at the time was only second to the Football League. Stoke neither struggled or impressed and they finished in 10th position with 36 points.

== Season review ==
=== League ===
After leaving the Birmingham & District League Stoke concentrated on the Southern League Division One which was now a much more tougher league. The squad was strengthened by Alfred Barker who brought in a new half back line with the arrival of Jimmy McGillvray, Jock Grieve and George Smart. Stoke made a useful start to the season and held a position in the top half of the table, but four defeats either side of Christmas saw them plunge into the bottom five and prospects for the new year did not look too promising. Yet, things did manage to improve on the pitch. Goalkeeper Richard Herron and right-half Sam Baddeley were restored to the first team and forwards John Lenaghan and Tom Revill joined to add some much needed punch up front. Stoke sold both Arthur Cartlidge and Jock Grieve to South Shields for a decent price while Jack Peart joined Newcastle United for £600. Stoke ended the season with a 7–0 victory over Millwall Athletic.

Stoke had some good crowds at home in 1911–12 with 18,000 present to see the opening match against Brighton & Hove Albion. However Stoke fans developed a reputation following a near riot in December 1911 home defeat to Queens Park Rangers. The referee had no choice but to abandon the match with just two minutes remaining, although the league ordered the result to stand. Stoke had to pay £4,000 for the installation of fences around the ground which came as a bitter blow to the club's finances following the debacle in 1908.

=== FA Cup ===
Stoke made an early exit to Walsall in the fifth qualifying round losing 2–1 at Fellows Park.

== Final league table ==
Pos	Team	Pld	W	D	L	GF	GA	GAv	Pts
1	Queens Park Rangers	38	21	11	6	59	35	1.686	53
2	Plymouth Argyle	38	23	6	9	63	31	2.032	52
3	Northampton Town	38	22	7	9	82	41	2.000	51
4	Swindon Town	38	21	6	11	82	50	1.640	48
5	Brighton & Hove Albion	38	19	9	10	73	35	2.086	47
6	Coventry City	38	17	8	13	66	54	1.222	42
7	Crystal Palace	38	15	10	13	70	46	1.522	40
8	Millwall	38	15	10	13	60	57	1.053	40
9	Watford	38	13	10	15	56	58	0.966	36
10	Stoke	38	13	10	15	51	63	0.810	36
11	Reading	38	11	14	13	43	68	0.632	36
12	Norwich City	38	10	14	14	40	60	0.667	34
13	West Ham United	38	13	7	18	64	69	0.928	33
14	Brentford	38	12	9	17	60	65	0.923	33
15	Exeter City	38	11	11	16	48	62	0.774	33
16	Southampton	38	10	11	17	46	63	0.730	31
17	Bristol Rovers	38	9	13	16	41	62	0.661	31
18	New Brompton	38	11	9	18	35	72	0.486	31
19	Luton Town	38	9	10	19	49	61	0.803	28
20	Leyton	38	7	11	20	27	62	0.435	25

== Results ==
Stoke's score comes first

=== Legend ===
Win	Draw	Loss

=== Southern Football League Division One ===
Match	Date	Opponent	Venue	Result	Attendance	Scorers
1	2 September 1911	Brighton & Hove Albion	H	2–1	18,000	W Smith, A Smith
2	9 September 1911	Luton Town	A	1–1	8,000	W Smith
3	16 September 1911	Coventry City	A	2–3	9,000	Peart, Grieve (pen)
4	23 September 1911	Leyton	H	0–0	10,000	
5	30 September 1911	Norwich City	A	1–2	2,500	Jordan
6	7 October 1911	Crystal Palace	H	2–1	17,000	Peart, Griffiths
7	14 October 1911	Southampton	A	0–1	8,000	
8	21 October 1911	Plymouth Argyle	H	2–1	8,000	Griffiths, Dyke
9	28 October 1911	Reading	A	1–1	7,000	W Smith
10	4 November 1911	Watford	H	1–0	12,000	A Smith
11	6 November 1911	Exeter City	H	1–3	7,000	Peart
12	11 November 1911	New Brompton	A	1–1	4,000	Peart
13	25 November 1911	Brentford	A	1–0	5,000	Peart
14	2 December 1911	Queens Park Rangers	H	0–2	13,000	
15	9 December 1911	Millwall Athletic	A	1–5	4,000	Hardman
16	16 December 1911	West Ham United	H	4–3	10,000	Hardman, Lenaghan (3)
17	25 December 1911	Swindon Town	A	0–3	18,000	
18	26 December 1911	Swindon Town	H	1–4	10,000	Leese
19	30 December 1911	Brighton & Hove Albion	A	0–4	3,000	
20	20 January 1912	Coventry City	H	3–1	4,000	Baddeley, Jordan, Lenaghan
21	27 January 1912	Leyton	A	0–2	3,000	
22	3 February 1912	Norwich City	H	1–1	5,000	Peart
23	10 February 1912	Crystal Palace	A	2–1	8,000	Peart, Hardman
24	17 February 1912	Southampton	H	0–3	10,000	
25	24 February 1912	Plymouth Argyle	A	0–3	7,000	
26	28 February 1912	Bristol Rovers	A	2–2	2,000	W Smith (2)
27	2 March 1912	Reading	H	0–0	10,000	
28	9 March 1912	Watford	A	2–4	3,000	W Smith (2)
29	16 March 1912	New Brompton	H	2–0	4,000	Baddeley, Jones
30	18 March 1912	Luton Town	H	4–3	5,000	Jones, W Smith, Lenaghan, Revill
31	23 March 1912	Exeter City	A	1–1	3,000	Revill
32	30 March 1912	Brentford	H	1–1	5,000	W Smith
33	6 April 1912	Queens Park Rangers	A	0–1	30,000	
34	8 April 1912	Northampton Town	H	1–0	7,000	Revill
35	9 April 1912	Northampton Town	A	1–3	3,000	Hodkin
36	13 April 1912	Millwall Athletic	H	7–0	7,000	Lenaghan (3), A Smith (2), Revill (2)
37	20 April 1912	West Ham United	A	0–0	6,000	
38	27 April 1912	Bristol Rovers	H	3–1	5,000	Revill, Turner (pen), Dyke

=== FA Cup ===
Round	Date	Opponent	Venue	Result	Attendance	Scorers
5QR	18 November 1911	Walsall	A	1–2	6,569	W Smith

== Squad statistics ==
Pos.	Name	League		FA Cup		Total	
Pos.	Name	Apps	Goals	Apps	Goals	Apps	Goals
GK	(England) Arthur Cartlidge	22	0	1	0	23	0
GK	(England) Richard Herron	16	0	0	0	16	0
DF	(Scotland) James Hay	8	0	0	0	8	0
DF	(England) Ernest Mullineux	23	0	1	0	24	0
DF	(England) George Smart	29	0	1	0	30	0
DF	(England) George Turner	13	1	0	0	13	1
MF	(England) Sam Baddeley	20	2	0	0	20	2
MF	(England) Archie Dyke	24	2	0	0	24	2
MF	(Scotland) Jock Grieve	23	1	1	0	24	1
MF	(England) Harold Hardman	27	3	1	0	28	3
MF	(England) Ernest Hodkin	5	1	0	0	5	1
MF	(Wales) Joe Jones	31	2	1	0	32	2
MF	(England) Jimmy McGillvray	24	0	1	0	25	0
MF	(England) Jack Robinson	8	0	0	0	8	0
FW	(England) Amos Baddeley	1	0	0	0	1	0
FW	(England) Arthur Griffiths	11	2	1	0	12	2
FW	(England) Frank Jordan	10	2	0	0	10	2
FW	(England) Harry Leese	14	1	0	0	14	1
FW	(England) John Lenaghan	18	8	0	0	18	8
FW	(England) Bill Nixon	2	0	0	0	2	0
FW	(England) Jack Peart	23	7	1	0	24	7
FW	(England) Tom Revill	14	6	0	0	14	6
FW	(England) Alf Smith	23	4	1	0	24	4
FW	(England) William Smith	29	9	1	1	30	10
