= Ernest Boulton =

Ernest Boulton may refer to:

- Ernest Boulton (1848–1905), Victorian cross-dresser and suspected homosexual, see Boulton and Park
- Ernest Boulton (footballer) (1889–1959), English footballer
