= Sproson =

Sproson is an English surname. Notable people with the surname include:

- Archie Sproson (1890–1980), English footballer
- Emma Sproson, English suffragette
- Phil Sproson (born 1959), English footballer
- Roy Sproson, English footballer
- Thomas Sproson, English footballer
