= George Turner (footballer, born 1887) =

English footballer

Personal information
- Full name: George Turner
- Date of birth: 1887
- Place of birth: Stoke-upon-Trent, England
- Date of death: 1958 (aged 71)
- Place of death: Stoke-on-Trent, England
- Position: Defender

Senior career*
| Years | Team | Apps | (Gls) |
- Halmer End AC
| 1908–1915 | Stoke | 176 | (17) |
- * Club domestic league appearances and goals

George Turner (1887–1958) was an English footballer who played for Stoke from 1908 to 1915. He was born in Stoke-upon-Trent.

== Career ==
Turner joined Stoke at a time when it seemed that football in Stoke-on-Trent was coming to an end with both professional clubs, Stoke and Port Vale both suffering financial meltdown and resignation from the Football League. Stoke's problem had been a disaster waiting to happen after a number of years of financial mismanagement and in 1907–08 season the club had lost the backing from their supporters who boycotted attending matches at the Victoria Ground. Chairman William Cowlishaw tried in vain to rally support and after admitting to failure he pulled Stoke out of the league and into liquidation. It was then the local interest returned to just two months later in June 1908 the club had been saved and a new board of directors had been appointed with Alfred Barker being made manager. After failing to gain a belated entrance in the Football League, Stoke had to start again in the Birmingham & District League.

Stoke re-branded themselves at Stoke F.C. (1908) in an attempt of re-ignite the local interest of football. Turner symbolised the rekindling of the interest of football in the city having had ambitions to become a gymnast at Halmer End Athletic Club Turner decided to play football instead, and joined Stoke, his decision was reported in the local newspaper, The Sentinel and his story was used as a marketing tool to get supporters back through the gates. He became a vital member of the club's revival as more player's joined the club and local interest in Stoke grew. For the club's first home match of the 1908–09 season against Aston Villa Reserves around 12,000 fans turned up and thus Stoke were able to continue with the safe knowledge that they still had the local support.

Turner became a firm fan favourite and club captain and he want of to amass 176 league appearances for the club and helping them to re-claim their league status in 1915. Despite being a defender Turner was the regular penalty taker and scored 17 goals most from the spot. He was widely expected to retain the captaincy for Stoke's return to the league in 1919 but during World War I he suffered a bad wound on his leg which had to be amputated after infection set in.

== Career statistics ==
| Club | Season | League | | FA Cup | | Total | |
| Club | Season | Apps | Goals | Apps | Goals | Apps | Goals |
|---|---|---|---|---|---|---|---|
| Stoke | 1908–09 | 15 | 0 | 0 | 0 | 15 | 0 |
| Stoke | 1909–10 | 20 | 2 | 1 | 0 | 21 | 1 |
| Stoke | 1910–11 | 42 | 9 | 3 | 0 | 45 | 9 |
| Stoke | 1911–12 | 13 | 1 | 0 | 0 | 13 | 1 |
| Stoke | 1912–13 | 33 | 1 | 2 | 0 | 35 | 1 |
| Stoke | 1913–14 | 29 | 4 | 3 | 0 | 32 | 4 |
| Stoke | 1914–15 | 24 | 1 | 4 | 0 | 28 | 1 |
| Career Total | | 176 | 17 | 13 | 0 | 189 | 17 |
