= John McGillivray =

John McGillivray may refer to:

- John McGillivray (fur trader) (c. 1770–1855), member of the Legislative Council of Upper Canada
- John Alexander McGillivray (1853–1911), member of the Canadian Parliament for Ontario North
- John McGillivray (footballer) (1886–1977), English footballer

== See also ==
- John McGilvrey (1867–1945), American academic and first president of Kent State University
