= Archie Heggarty =

Irish footballer

Personal information
- Full name: Archibald Heggarty
- Date of birth: 1884
- Place of birth: Belfast, Ireland
- Date of death: 1951 (aged 67)
- Place of death: Belfast, Northern Ireland
- Position: Winger

Senior career*
Years	Team	Apps	(Gls)
- Lisburn Distillery
1912–1913	Stoke	20	(1)
1914–19??	Crusaders		
- * Club domestic league appearances and goals

Archibald Heggarty (1884 – 1951) was an Irish footballer who played for Stoke.

== Career ==
Heggarty was born in Belfast and played for Lisburn Distillery before joining English side Stoke in 1912. He played 22 times for Stoke in 1912–13, scoring once before returning to Ireland with the Crusaders.

== Career statistics ==
Club	Season	League		FA Cup		Total	
Club	Season	Apps	Goals	Apps	Goals	Apps	Goals
Stoke	1912–13	20	1	2	0	22	1
Career Total		20	1	2	0	22	1
