= Bill Nixon =

English footballer

Personal information
- Full name: William John Nixon
- Date of birth: 1886
- Place of birth: Stoke-upon-Trent, England
- Date of death: 1916 (aged 30)
- Place of death: France
- Position: Outside forward

Senior career*
Years	Team	Apps	(Gls)
1910	Trentham		
1911–1912	Stoke	2	(0)
- * Club domestic league appearances and goals

William John Nixon (1886–1916) was an English footballer who played for Stoke.

== Career ==
Nixon was born in Stoke-upon-Trent and played football with Trentham before joining Stoke in 1910. He played in two matches towards the 1911–12 season which included a 7–0 win over Millwall Athletic before joining the army at end of the season. He died in France during World War I.

== Career statistics ==
Club	Season	League		FA Cup		Total	
Club	Season	Apps	Goals	Apps	Goals	Apps	Goals
Stoke	1911–12	2	0	0	0	2	0
Career Total		2	0	0	0	2	0
