= Victor Hall (footballer) =

English footballer

Personal information
- Full name: Victor Hall
- Date of birth: 1884
- Place of birth: Ashton-under-Lyne, England
- Date of death: 1966 (aged 82)
- Place of death: England
- Position: Midfielder

Senior career*
Years	Team	Apps	(Gls)
- Macclesfield Town
1910–1911	Stoke	1	(0)
1911–19??	Macclesfield Town		
- * Club domestic league appearances and goals

Victor Hall (1884 – 1966) was an English footballer who played for Stoke.

== Career ==
Hall was born in Ashton-under-Lyne and played amateur football with Macclesfield Town before joining Stoke in 1910. He played in one first team match which came in a 1–0 win over Aberdare during the 1910–11 season before returning to amateur football with Macclesfield Town.

== Career statistics ==
Club	Season	League		FA Cup		Total	
Club	Season	Apps	Goals	Apps	Goals	Apps	Goals
Stoke	1910–11	1	0	0	0	1	0
Career Total		1	0	0	0	1	0
