= Richard Burton (footballer) =

English footballer

Personal information
- Full name: Richard Arnold Burton
- Date of birth: 1889
- Place of birth: Stoke-upon-Trent, England
- Date of death: 1939 (aged 50)
- Position: Defender

Senior career*
Years	Team	Apps	(Gls)
–	North Staffs Normads		
1913–1914	Stoke	2	(0)
1914–19??	North Staffs Normads		
- * Club domestic league appearances and goals

Richard Arnold Burton (1889–1939) was an English footballer who played for Stoke.

== Career ==
Burton was born in Stoke-upon-Trent and played amateur football with North Staffs Normads before joining Stoke in 1913. He played in two first team matches for Stoke during the 1913–14 season before returning to North Staffs Normads.

== Career statistics ==
Appearances and goals by club, season and competition
Club	Season	League		FA Cup		Total		
Club	Season	Division	Apps	Goals	Apps	Goals	Apps	Goals
Stoke	1913–14	2	0	0	0	2	0	
Career total		2	0	0	0	2	0	
