= Tom Thornton (footballer) =

English footballer (1885–1951)

Personal information
- Full name: Thomas Thornton
- Date of birth: 1885
- Place of birth: Birmingham, England
- Date of death: 1951 (aged 66)
- Place of death: Birmingham, England
- Position: Defender

Senior career*
Years	Team	Apps	(Gls)
- Kingstanding Swifts
1909	Crewe Alexandra	0	(0)
1910–1911	Stoke	20	(1)
1911–19??	Newport County		
- * Club domestic league appearances and goals

Thomas Thornton (1885–1951) was an English footballer who played for Stoke.

== Career ==
Thornton was born in Birmingham and played amateur football with Kingstanding Swifts before joining Crewe Alexandra. After an unsuccessful spell in Crewe, Baxter joined Stoke and played 20 times for the "Potters" scoring once during the 1910–11 season. He later played for Newport County.

== Career statistics ==
Appearances and goals by club, season and competition
Club	Season	League		FA Cup		Total	
Club	Season	Apps	Goals	Apps	Goals	Apps	Goals
Stoke	1910–11	20	1	0	0	20	1
Career total		20	1	0	0	20	1
