= William Holmes (footballer) =

English footballer

Personal information
- Full name: William Hall Holmes
- Date of birth: 1889
- Place of birth: Stoke-upon-Trent, England
- Date of death: 1933 (aged 44)
- Place of death: Wales
- Position: Midfielder

Senior career*
Years	Team	Apps	(Gls)
–	Leek Alexandra		
1912–1914	Stoke	7	(3)
1914–19??	Mid Rhondda		
- * Club domestic league appearances and goals

William Hall Holmes (1889–1933) was an English footballer who played for Stoke.

== Career ==
Steel was born in Stoke-upon-Trent and played amateur football with Leek Alexandra before joining Stoke in 1912. He in nine matches and scored four goals for Stoke in two seasons before leaving in 1914 for Welsh club Mid Rhondda.

== Career statistics ==
Appearances and goals by club, season and competition
Club	Season	League		FA Cup		Total	
Club	Season	Apps	Goals	Apps	Goals	Apps	Goals
Stoke	1912–13	5	3	0	0	5	3
Stoke	1913–14	2	0	2	1	4	1
Career total		7	3	2	1	9	4
