= 1912–13 Stoke F.C. season =

Stoke
1912–13 season
- Chairman: Mr Rev. A Hurst
- Manager: Alfred Barker
- Stadium: Victoria Ground
- Southern League Division One: 20th (24 Points)
- FA Cup: First Round
- Top goalscorer: League: Alf Smith (9); All: Tom Revill & Alf Smith (9)
- Highest home attendance: 10,000 vs Northampton Town (14 September 1912)
- Lowest home attendance: 3,500 vs Reading (19 April 1913)
- Average home league attendance: 5,947
Home colours

The 1912–13 season was Stoke's fourth season in the Southern Football League. In 1913, the club reached its 50th year in existence.

Stoke had ambitions to return to the Football League and the objective for the 1912–13 season was earn a top six place in the Southern League Division One. However Stoke failed spectacularly and ended up finishing bottom and being relegated to the Southern League Division Two. The season was a complete embarrassment to the directors and management and fans started to lose patience with manager Alfred Barker.

== Season review ==
=== League ===
With Alfred Barker still manager of the club there were high hopes that the 1912–13 season would see Stoke come good in the top division of the Southern League. The players who had served the club well over the past 12 months or so were all retained and new players were added to the squad to make competition for places harder. The main ambition was a top six place, but by Christmas time Stoke were bottom of the table and stayed there. The directors attributed relegation to bad luck while the supporters blamed Barker. William Smith, who had been such a key player in attack missed most of the season through injury and his absence proved costly as Stoke had a very poor forward line. Only 14 goals were scored in the first 15 matches (4 against Watford) summed up Stoke's problems and there was no upturn in fortune after Christmas and relegation was duly suffered and it was back to the drawing board once more.

By the end of the season the directors came under considerable pressure from supporters as they were reluctant to accept a place back in Division Two and by the end of April 1913 no players had been offered a new contract contrary to previous practice. The directors eventually accepted life in the Southern League Division Two again but fans vented their anger at them in the annual general meeting.

=== FA Cup ===
Stoke's miserable season also included a first round exit to fellow Southern League side Reading.

== Final league table ==
Pos	Club	P	W	D	L	F	A	GA	Pts
1	Plymouth Argyle	38	22	6	10	77	36	2.138	50
2	Swindon Town	38	20	8	10	66	41	1.609	48
3	West Ham United	38	18	12	8	66	46	1.434	48
4	Queens Park Rangers	38	18	10	10	46	35	1.314	46
5	Crystal Palace	38	17	11	10	55	36	1.527	45
6	Millwall	38	19	7	12	62	43	1.441	45
7	Exeter City	38	18	8	12	48	44	1.090	44
8	Reading	38	17	8	13	59	55	1.072	42
9	Brighton & Hove Albion	38	13	12	13	48	47	1.021	38
10	Northampton Town	38	12	12	14	61	48	1.270	36
11	Portsmouth	38	14	8	16	41	49	0.836	36
12	Merthyr Town	38	12	12	14	42	60	0.700	36
13	Coventry City	38	13	8	17	53	59	0.898	34
14	Watford	38	12	10	16	43	50	0.860	34
15	Gillingham	38	12	10	16	36	53	0.679	34
16	Bristol Rovers	38	12	9	17	55	64	0.859	33
17	Southampton	38	10	11	17	40	72	0.555	31
18	Norwich City	38	10	9	19	39	50	0.780	29
19	Brentford	38	11	5	22	42	55	0.763	27
20	Stoke	38	10	4	24	39	75	0.520	24

Key: P = Matches played; W = Matches won; D = Matches drawn; L = Matches lost; F = Goals for; A = Goals against; GA = Goal average; Pts = Points

== Results ==
Stoke's score comes first

=== Legend ===
Win	Draw	Loss

=== Southern Football League Division One ===
Match	Date	Opponent	Venue	Result	Attendance	Scorers
1	2 September 1912	Norwich City	H	0–1	10,000	
2	5 September 1912	Norwich City	A	0–1	3,000	
3	7 September 1912	Brighton & Hove Albion	A	1–3	4,000	Whittaker
4	14 September 1912	Northampton Town	H	1–0	4,000	A Smith
5	21 September 1912	Coventry City	A	2–5	6,000	A Smith, Revill
6	28 September 1912	Queens Park Rangers	H	0–0	7,000	
7	2 October 1912	Watford	A	4–2	4,000	Revill (2), Hardman, English (o.g.)
8	12 October 1912	Brentford	H	1–0	5,000	Hardman
9	19 October 1912	Merthyr Town	A	1–2	3,000	A Smith
10	26 October 1912	Millwall Athletic	H	0–2	3,000	
11	2 November 1912	Crystal Palace	A	0–1	3,000	
12	9 November 1912	Bristol Rovers	H	2–1	4,000	A Smith, Turner (pen)
13	16 November 1912	Plymouth Argyle	A	0–4	5,000	
14	23 November 1912	Swindon Town	H	1–1	8,000	Revill
15	30 November 1912	Southampton	A	1–2	7,000	A Smith
16	7 December 1912	Portsmouth	H	2–0	6,000	Revill, Lenaghan
17	14 December 1912	Reading	A	2–6	3,000	Lenaghan, Hardman
18	21 December 1912	Exeter City	H	0–2	5,000	
19	25 December 1912	West Ham United	A	0–5	8,000	
20	26 December 1912	West Ham United	H	0–1	10,000	
21	28 December 1912	Brighton & Hove Albion	H	4–1	7,000	A Smith, Revill, Hardman, Herbert
22	4 January 1913	Northampton Town	A	0–9	1,600	
23	18 January 1913	Coventry City	H	0–1	5,000	
24	25 January 1913	Queens Park Rangers	A	0–1	12,000	
25	6 February 1913	Watford	H	1–2	6,000	Herbert
26	15 February 1913	Brentford	A	2–4	2,000	Herbert, A Smith
27	22 February 1913	Merthyr Town	H	2–0	4,000	Herbert, A Smith
28	1 March 1913	Millwall Athletic	A	2–1	9,000	Herbert, Pentland
29	8 March 1913	Crystal Palace	H	0–0	7,000	
30	14 March 1913	Bristol Rovers	A	0–4	2,000	
31	21 March 1913	Gillingham	A	0–0	5,000	
32	22 March 1913	Plymouth Argyle	H	0–2	5,000	
33	24 March 1913	Gillingham	H	0–2	3,500	
34	29 March 1913	Swindon Town	A	2–3	3,000	W Smith, Holmes
35	5 April 1913	Southampton	H	3–1	4,000	W Smith, Holmes (2)
36	12 April 1913	Portsmouth	A	1–4	4,000	A Smith
37	19 April 1913	Reading	H	4–0	3,500	Revill, W Smith (2), Heggarty
38	26 April 1913	Exeter City	A	0–1	1,000	

=== FA Cup ===
Round	Date	Opponent	Venue	Result	Attendance	Scorers
R1	16 January 1913	Reading	H	2–2	14,000	A Smith, Revill
R1 Replay	22 January 1913	Reading	A	0–3	12,000	

== Squad statistics ==
Pos.	Name	League		FA Cup		Total	
Pos.	Name	Apps	Goals	Apps	Goals	Apps	Goals
GK	(England) Bert Gadsden	33	0	2	0	35	0
GK	(England) Richard Herron	5	0	0	0	5	0
DF	(England) Ernest Mullineux	16	0	1	0	17	0
DF	(England) Charles James	1	0	0	0	1	0
DF	(England) Alec Milne	16	0	0	0	16	0
DF	(England) George Smart	15	0	0	0	15	0
DF	(England) George Turner	33	1	2	0	35	1
MF	(England) Sam Baddeley	29	0	2	0	31	0
MF	(England) Crop Hawkins	1	0	0	0	1	0
MF	(England) Ernest Hodkin	22	0	2	0	24	0
MF	(England) Henry Hargreaves	2	0	0	0	2	0
MF	(Wales) Joe Jones	30	0	2	0	32	0
MF	(England) Jimmy McVay	11	0	0	0	11	0
MF	(England) Albert Pitt	4	0	0	0	4	0
MF	(England) George Roche	3	0	0	0	3	0
FW	(England) Tom Bailey	13	0	0	0	13	0
FW	(England) Richard Coates	1	0	0	0	1	0
FW	(England) Harold Leese	5	0	1	0	6	0
FW	(England) John Lenaghan	19	2	0	0	19	2
FW	(England) Harold Hardman	19	4	0	0	19	4
FW	Archie Heggarty	20	1	2	0	22	1
FW	(England) Billy Herbert	16	5	2	0	18	5
FW	(England) William Holmes	5	3	0	0	5	3
FW	(England) Fred Pentland	5	1	0	0	5	1
FW	(England) Tom Revill	34	8	2	1	36	9
FW	(England) Alf Smith	34	9	2	1	36	10
FW	(England) William Smith	5	3	0	0	5	3
FW	(England) Archie Sproson	1	0	0	0	1	0
FW	(England) Billy Tempest	4	0	0	0	4	0
FW	(England) Enos Whittaker	16	1	2	0	18	1
–	Own goals	–	1	–	0	–	1
