= Jock Grieve =

Scottish footballer

Personal information
- Full name: John Grieve
- Date of birth: 1887
- Place of birth: Edinburgh, Scotland
- Date of death: 1965 (aged 77–78)
- Place of death: Edinburgh, Scotland
- Position: Midfielder

Senior career*
Years	Team	Apps	(Gls)
- Distillery
1905–1909	Hibernian	91	(5)
1909–1911	Watford	62	(1)
1911–1912	Stoke	23	(1)
1912	South Shields		
- * Club domestic league appearances and goals

John Grieve (1887 – 1955) was a Scottish footballer who played for Hibernian, Stoke and Watford.

== Career ==
Grieve was born in Edinburgh and began his career with Irish side Distillery before returning to play for Hibernian in 1905. He spent four years at Hibs making 91 League appearances scoring five goals and then moved south to Watford in 1909. After two seasons at Watford he joined Stoke where he played 25 times scoring once a penalty against Coventry City. He later played for South Shields.

== Career statistics ==
Appearances and goals by club, season and competition
Club	Season	League			FA Cup		Total	
Club	Season	Division	Apps	Goals	Apps	Goals	Apps	Goals
Hibernian	1905–06	Scottish Division One	24	0	5	0	29	0
Hibernian	1906–07	Scottish Division One	28	2	9	0	37	2
Hibernian	1907–08	Scottish Division One	28	3	3	0	31	3
Hibernian	1908–09	Scottish Division One	11	0	2	0	13	0
Hibernian	Total		91	5	19	0	110	5
Watford	1909–10	Southern League Division One	34	1	0	0	34	1
Watford	1910–11	Southern League Division One	28	0	0	0	28	0
Watford	Total		62	1	0	0	62	1
Stoke	1911–12	Southern League Division One	23	1	1	0	24	1
Career total			179	7	20	0	199	7
