= John Paxton (footballer) =

English footballer

Personal information
- Full name: John Paxton
- Date of birth: 1890
- Place of birth: West Stanley, England
- Position: Forward

Senior career*
Years	Team	Apps	(Gls)
- West Stanley
1910–1911	Stoke	3	(1)
1911–19??	Chesterfield		
- * Club domestic league appearances and goals

John Paxton (born 1890) was an English footballer who played for Stoke.

== Career ==
Paxton started his career with his local side West Stanley before joining Stoke in 1910. He played three times for Stoke during the 1910–11 season scoring once which came in a 4–0 win over Stafford Rangers in the Birmingham & District League. He left at the end of the season and joined Chesterfield.

== Career statistics ==
Appearances and goals by club, season and competition
Club	Season	League		FA Cup		Total	
Club	Season	Apps	Goals	Apps	Goals	Apps	Goals
Stoke	1910–11	3	1	0	0	3	1
Career total		3	1	0	0	3	1
