= Jack Robinson (footballer, born 1887) =

English footballer

Personal information
- Full name: John Robinson
- Date of birth: 1887
- Place of birth: Birmingham, England
- Date of death: ?
- Position: Midfielder

Senior career*
Years	Team	Apps	(Gls)
1908–1910	Aston Villa	0	(0)
1911–1912	Stoke	8	(0)
1912–19??	King's Heath Birmingham		
- * Club domestic league appearances and goals

John Robinson (1887–?) was an English footballer who played for Stoke.

== Career ==
Robinson was born in Birmingham and began his career with Aston Villa before joining Stoke in 1911. He turn out eight times for the "Potters" before leaving to play amateur football with King's Heath Birmingham.

== Career statistics ==
Appearances and goals by club, season and competition
Club	Season	League		FA Cup		Total	
Club	Season	Apps	Goals	Apps	Goals	Apps	Goals
Stoke	1911–12	8	0	0	0	8	0
Career Total		8	0	0	0	8	0
