= Richard Herron =

English footballer

Personal information
- Full name: Richard Herron
- Date of birth: 1890
- Place of birth: Durham, England
- Date of death: 19 September 1918 (aged 27–28)
- Place of death: Aisne, France
- Position: Goalkeeper

Senior career*
Years	Team	Apps	(Gls)
- West Stanley
1910–1915	Stoke	44	(0)
- * Club domestic league appearances and goals

Richard Herron (1890 – 19 September 1918) was an English footballer who played for Stoke.

== Career ==
Herron was born in Durham and began his career with non-league West Stanley. He moved to Stoke in 1910 who at the time were playing in the Southern League and began a useful back up to first choice Bert Gadsden. He played in 20 matches in 1914–15 as Stoke won the Southern Football League Division Two title and were able to gain re-election to the Football League and Herron was tipped to become a fine goalkeeper. However, World War I was declared and Herron joined the Army, serving as private in the 2nd battalion of the Sherwood Foresters. He was killed in action in France in 1918 and was buried at Trefcon British Cemetery, Caulaincourt.

== Career statistics ==
Appearances and goals by club, season and competition
Club	Season	League		FA Cup		Total	
Club	Season	Apps	Goals	Apps	Goals	Apps	Goals
Stoke	1910–11	5	0	0	0	5	0
Stoke	1911–12	16	0	0	0	16	0
Stoke	1912–13	5	0	0	0	5	0
Stoke	1913–14	0	0	0	0	0	0
Stoke	1914–15	18	0	2	0	20	0
Career total		44	0	2	0	46	0
