= Alec Milne (footballer, born 1889) =

English footballer

Personal information
- Full name: Alexander James Milne
- Date of birth: 29 September 1889
- Place of birth: Hebburn, England
- Date of death: 1970 (aged 81)
- Place of death: Doncaster, England
- Height: 5 ft 8 1/2 in (1.74 m)
- Position: Left back

Senior career*
Years	Team	Apps	(Gls)
- West Stanley
–	Hebburn Argyle		
1912–1926	Stoke	257	(0)
1926–1929	Doncaster Rovers	74	(0)
Total		331	(0)
- * Club domestic league appearances and goals

Alexander James Milne (29 September 1889 – 1970) was an English footballer who played in the Football League for Doncaster Rovers and Stoke.

== Career ==
Milne was born in Hebburn and joined Stoke at the age of 23 after playing amateur football with West Stanley and Hebburn Argyle. He made his debut in a Southern League match against West Ham United which Stoke lost 5–0. He became known for his no-nonsense tackling and solid performances at left back and helped the club to gain a return to the Football League in 1914–15. However it was delayed due to the outbreak of World War I during which time Milne returned to his home of Hebburn.

The league returned in 1919 and Milne established himself in the starting eleven and played in every match during the 1920–21 season and helped the side gain promotion to the First Division in 1921–22. Stoke were relegated however and injury caused Milne to miss all of the 1923–24 campaign. He remained at the Victoria Ground for two more seasons before leaving for Doncaster Rovers after making 276 appearances in all competitions for the "Potters". He remained at Doncaster until he was 41.

== Career statistics ==
Club	Season	League			FA Cup		Total	
Club	Season	Division	Apps	Goals	Apps	Goals	Apps	Goals
Stoke	1912–13	Southern League Division One	16	0	0	0	16	0
Stoke	1913–14	Southern League Division Two	25	0	3	0	28	0
Stoke	1914–15	Southern League Division Two	24	0	4	0	28	0
Stoke	1919–20	Second Division	30	0	1	0	31	0
Stoke	1920–21	Second Division	42	0	1	0	43	0
Stoke	1921–22	Second Division	41	0	5	0	46	0
Stoke	1922–23	First Division	36	0	2	0	38	0
Stoke	1923–24	Second Division	0	0	0	0	0	0
Stoke	1924–25	Second Division	18	0	1	0	19	0
Stoke	1925–26	Second Division	25	0	2	0	27	0
Stoke	Total		257	0	19	0	276	0
Doncaster Rovers	1926–27	Third Division North	40	0	2	0	42	0
Doncaster Rovers	1927–28	Third Division North	27	0	1	0	28	0
Doncaster Rovers	1928–29	Third Division North	2	0	0	0	2	0
Doncaster Rovers	1929–30	Third Division North	5	0	0	0	5	0
Doncaster Rovers	Total		74	0	3	0	77	0
Career total			331	0	22	0	353	0

== Honours ==
Stoke

- Southern Football League Division Two champion: 1914–15
- Football League Second Division runner-up: 1921–22
