= Crop Hawkins =

English footballer

Personal information
- Full name: Albert Crop Hawkins
- Date of birth: 1893
- Place of birth: Stoke-upon-Trent, England
- Date of death: 1950 (aged 57)
- Height: 5 ft 11 in (1.80 m)
- Position: Midfielder

Senior career*
Years	Team	Apps	(Gls)
–	Stoke St Peter's		
1912–1914	Stoke	4	(0)
1914–19??	Stoke United		
- * Club domestic league appearances and goals

Albert Crop Hawkins (1893–1950) was an English footballer who played for Stoke.

== Career ==
Hawkins was born in Stoke-upon-Trent and played amateur football with Stoke St Peter's before joining Stoke in 1912. He spent two seasons at Stoke making a modest four appearances. He then returned to amateur football with Stoke United.

== Career statistics ==
Club	Season	League		FA Cup		Total	
Club	Season	Apps	Goals	Apps	Goals	Apps	Goals
Stoke	1912–13	1	0	0	0	1	0
Stoke	1913–14	3	0	0	0	3	0
Career Total		4	0	0	0	4	0
