= Albert Savage =

English footballer

Personal information
- Full name: Albert George Savage
- Date of birth: 1888
- Place of birth: Warwick, England
- Position: Forward

Senior career*
Years	Team	Apps	(Gls)
- Nuneaton Town
1910–1911	Stoke	9	(4)
1911–19??	Bulkington		
- * Club domestic league appearances and goals

Albert George Savage (1888 – after 1911) was an English footballer who played for Stoke.

== Career ==
Savage was born in Warwick and played amateur football with Nuneaton Town before joining Stoke in 1910. At Stoke he scored four goals in nine matches during the 1910–11 season before returning to amateur football with Bulkington.

== Career statistics ==
Appearances and goals by club, season and competition
Club	Season	League		FA Cup		Total	
Club	Season	Apps	Goals	Apps	Goals	Apps	Goals
Stoke	1910–11	9	4	0	0	9	4
Career total		9	4	0	0	9	4
