= Walter Rowlands =

English footballer

Personal information
- Full name: Walter Rowlands
- Date of birth: 1888
- Place of birth: Stoke-upon-Trent, England
- Position: Midfielder

Senior career*
Years	Team	Apps	(Gls)
- Munton Juniors
1913–1914	Stoke	1	(0)
1914–19??	Stafford Rangers		
- * Club domestic league appearances and goals

Walter Rowlands (born 1888) was an English footballer who played for Stoke.

== Career ==
Rowlands was born in Stoke-upon-Trent and played amateur football with Munton Juniors before joining Stoke in 1914. He played in one first team match which came in a 4–1 defeat to Pontypridd during the 1913–14 season before returning to amateur football with Stafford Rangers.

== Career statistics ==
Club	Season	League		FA Cup		Total	
Club	Season	Apps	Goals	Apps	Goals	Apps	Goals
Stoke	1913–14	1	0	0	0	1	0
Career Total		1	0	0	0	1	0
