= Harry Holt (footballer) =

Welsh footballer (1889–1956)

Personal information
- Full name: Harold Holt
- Date of birth: 1889
- Place of birth: Aberystwyth, Wales
- Date of death: 1956 (aged 67)
- Place of death: Ruabon, Wales
- Position: Defender

Senior career*
Years	Team	Apps	(Gls)
- Aberystwyth Town
1910	Stoke	1	(0)
1911	Wrexham		
1911–1913	Mold Alexandra		
- * Club domestic league appearances and goals

Harold "Harry" Holt (1889–1956) was a Welsh footballer who played for Stoke.

== Career ==
Holt was born in Aberystwyth and played amateur football with Aberystwyth Town before joining Stoke in 1910. He played in one first team match which came in a 2–1 win over West Bromwich Albion Reserves during the 1910–11 season before returning to amateur football with Wrexham and then Mold Alexandra.

== Career statistics ==
Club	Season	League		FA Cup		Total	
Club	Season	Apps	Goals	Apps	Goals	Apps	Goals
Stoke	1910–11	1	0	0	0	1	0
Career total		1	0	0	0	1	0
