= Tancey Wharton =

English footballer

Personal information
- Full name: Tancey Clifford Arnold Wharton
- Date of birth: 1890
- Place of birth: Sunderland, Tyne and Wear, England
- Date of death: before 1980
- Position: Midfielder

Senior career*
Years	Team	Apps	(Gls)
- Seaham Harbour
1913–1914	Stoke	17	(0)
1914–19??	Grantham		
- * Club domestic league appearances and goals

Tancey Clifford Arnold Wharton (1890 – before 1980) was an English footballer who played for Stoke.

== Career ==
Wharton was born in Sunderland, Tyne and Wear and played amateur football with Seaham Harbour before joining Stoke in 1913. He played in 19 matches for Stoke during the 1913–14 season before joining Grantham.

== Career statistics ==
Appearances and goals by club, season and competition
Club	Season	League		FA Cup		Total	
Club	Season	Apps	Goals	Apps	Goals	Apps	Goals
Stoke	1913–14	17	0	2	0	19	0
Career total		17	0	2	0	19	0
