= Hodgkins =

Hodgkins may refer to:

In people

- Frances Hodgkins, an abstract painter
- Louise Manning Hodgkins (1846-1935), American educator, author, editor
- W. M. Hodgkins, New Zealand painter, father of Frances Hodgkins

In places

- Hodgkins, Illinois, a village in the United States
- Hodgkins Seamount, in the northern Pacific Ocean
- Hodgkins (crater), a crater on Mercury

Other uses

- Hodgkin's lymphoma, a type of cancer

== See also ==
- Hodgkin, a surname
