= Dick Hope =

Scottish footballer

Personal information
- Full name: Richard Hope
- Date of birth: 1890
- Place of birth: Glasgow, Scotland
- Date of death: 1969 (aged 79)
- Place of death: Glasgow, Scotland
- Position: Forward

Senior career*
Years	Team	Apps	(Gls)
–	Glasgow St Peter's		
1914–1915	Stoke	2	(0)
–	Port Glasgow		
- * Club domestic league appearances and goals

Richard Hope (1890 – 1969) was a Scottish footballer who played for Stoke.

== Career ==
Hope was born in Glasgow and began his career with Glasgow St Peter's. He joined Stoke in 1914 and played twice for the "Potters" in 1914–15 before returning to Scottish football with Port Glasgow.

== Career statistics ==
Club	Season	League		FA Cup		Total	
Club	Season	Apps	Goals	Apps	Goals	Apps	Goals
Stoke	1914–15	2	0	0	0	2	0
Career Total		2	0	0	0	2	0
