= Enos Whittaker =

English footballer

Personal information
- Full name: Enos Whittaker
- Date of birth: 1888
- Place of birth: Nelson, England
- Date of death: 1959 (aged 71)
- Place of death: Burnley, England
- Position: Right wing

Senior career*
Years	Team	Apps	(Gls)
1910–1912	Exeter City		
1912–1913	Stoke	16	(1)
1913	Clapton Orient		
- * Club domestic league appearances and goals

Enos Whittaker (1888–1959) was an English footballer who played for Clapton Orient, Exeter City and Stoke.

== Career ==
Whittaker was born in Nelson but began his career with Southern Football League side Exeter City. He joined Stoke in 1912 and played 18 matches for Stoke scoring once in 1912–13 before joining Clapton Orient.

== Career statistics ==
Club	Season	League		FA Cup		Total	
Club	Season	Apps	Goals	Apps	Goals	Apps	Goals
Stoke	1912–13	16	1	2	0	18	1
Career Total		16	1	2	0	18	1
