= Jimmy McVay =

English footballer (1889–1950)

Personal information
- Full name: James McVay
- Date of birth: 1889
- Place of birth: Wallsend, England
- Date of death: 1950 (aged 61)
- Position: Defender

Senior career*
Years	Team	Apps	(Gls)
- Wallsend Swifts
1911–1913	Stoke	12	(0)
1913–19??	Barnard Castle		
- * Club domestic league appearances and goals

James McVay (1889–1950) was an English footballer who played for Stoke.

== Career ==
McVay was born in Wallsend and played for Wallsend Swifts before joining Stoke in 1912. He played twelve times for Stoke before returning to the North East.

== Career statistics ==
Appearances and goals by club, season and competition
Club	Season	League		FA Cup		Total	
Club	Season	Apps	Goals	Apps	Goals	Apps	Goals
Stoke	1912–13	11	0	0	0	11	0
Stoke	1913–14	1	0	0	0	1	0
Career total		12	0	0	0	12	0
