= Jack Peart =

English footballer (1888–1948)

Personal information
- Full name: John George Peart
- Date of birth: 3 October 1888
- Place of birth: South Shields, England
- Date of death: 3 September 1948 (aged 59)
- Place of death: Paddington, England
- Height: 5 ft 10 in (1.78 m)
- Position: Centre-forward

Youth career
- 1904–1907: Adelaide South Shields

Senior career*
Years	Team	Apps	(Gls)
1907–1909	Sheffield United	27	(8)
1909–1912	Stoke	44	(38)
1912–1913	Newcastle United	17	(6)
1913–1919	Notts County	82	(51)
1919	Leeds City		
1919	Birmingham	3	(0)
1920	Derby County	9	(1)
1920–1922	Ebbw Vale Steel & Iron Company		
1922	Port Vale	7	(0)
1922–1923	Norwich City	21	(6)
1923–1924	Rochdale	21	(10)
Total		231+	(120+)

Managerial career
- 1920–1922: Ebbw Vale Steel & Iron Company (player-manager)
- 1923–1930: Rochdale
- 1930–1935: Bradford City
- 1935–1948: Fulham
- * Club domestic league appearances and goals

John George Peart (3 October 1888 – 3 September 1948) was an English footballer who played centre forward for 13 different teams in a career which spanned World War I. After he retired, he became a football manager until he died in 1948.

Peart was a centre-forward who had a nomadic career. He played for eight league clubs in a career which spanned 19 years and every division of the English Football League. He also played non-League football in the Southern and Welsh leagues, as well as guesting for other clubs during the First World War. Peart was known as the 'most injured man in football', his worst injury being a broken leg in 1910 at Stoke, which kept him out of football for two seasons. As a manager, he spent a further 25 years in the Football League, and took charge at Rochdale, Bradford City, and Fulham. He won two minor league titles with Stoke, won the Second Division with Notts County in 1913–14, and led Rochdale to second place in the Third Division North in 1923–24 and 1926–27.

== Playing career ==
Peart left Adelaide South Shields to sign with First Division side Sheffield United in 1907. He scored 50 goals for the reserve team in the 1907–08 season. He hit eight goals in 27 league appearances and helped the "Blades" finish 17th in 1907–08 and 12th in 1908–09. He then left Bramall Lane for Stoke in the Birmingham & District League in 1910. He spent two years at the Victoria Ground and made an impressive contribution, scoring 34 goals in 23 matches in 1910–11, his run being ended by a broken leg against Crewe Alexandra on 10 December 1910. He claimed hat-tricks against Dudley Town, Wolves Reserves, Treharris Athletic, and Kettering Town, and finished as the club's joint top-scorer (with Alf Smith) despite only playing in the first half of the season. His goals helped the "Potters" to secure the Birmingham & District League title and second place in the Southern League Division Two. After his recovery, Peart scored seven goals in 24 games in 1911–12, before the directors decided to cash in on their most profitable player.

He left the Potteries in March 1912 to return to top-flight football with Newcastle United, signing for a fee of £600. Peart made 17 competitive appearances for the "Magpies", all in the Football League, comprising nine in 1911–12 and eight in 1912–13, and scored three goals in each of those seasons. His first appearance for the club came at St James' Park on 16 March 1912 against Middlesbrough, and he scored his first goal the following week against Notts County.

He was sold to Notts County in February 1913, and finished as the club's top-scorer in 1912–13 with just seven goals, as County were relegated into the Second Division. He hit 28 league goals in 1913–14 to fire the club to promotion as divisional champions – he was also the division's joint top-scorer, with Sammy Stevens. He scored 11 goals in 1914–15, again finishing as the club's top-scorer. In his six years at Meadow Lane, he scored 51 goals in 82 league appearances. During World War I he served as a corporal in the Army and also guested for Rochdale, Leeds United, Stoke and Barnsley. He scored 71 goals in 107 appearances at Elland Road.

After a time with Leeds City, he played three Second Division games for Birmingham in the 1919–20 season, before moving on to Derby County in January 1920. He scored one goal in nine league games before departing the Baseball Ground.

In 1920 he joined Ebbw Vale Steel & Iron Company as player-manager. However, he resigned his post in January 1922, returning to the English Second Division with Port Vale. Injury limited his contribution to the Vale's 1921–22 campaign to just seven appearances and he was released from his contract at the Old Recreation Ground in the summer.

At 34 years old, Peart joined Norwich City in the Third Division South for the 1922–23 season. He was appointed player-manager of Rochdale in March 1923, retiring as a player in the 1923–24 season with a Rochdale tally of 10 goals in 22 senior games.

== Style of play ==
Peart was only 5 ft 10 in (1.78 m), but was physically imposing and was known as "the nightmare of goalkeepers". However, he was also skilful, adept at flicking the ball on to his teammates despite his tendency to lose the ball by attempting to beat the entire defence by himself. Despite his physique, he was prone to injury.

== Managerial career ==
=== Rochdale ===
Peart spent a short period as player-manager at Ebbw Vale, before managing Rochdale from 1923 to 1930. He took the "Dale" to a second-place finish in the Third Division North in 1923–24; they were one point behind champions Wolverhampton Wanderers, but only Wolves were promoted. Rochdale then finished sixth in 1924–25, before finishing third in 1925–26, just two points behind champions Grimsby Town. They again narrowly missed out on promotion in 1926–27, after ending the campaign in second place, five points behind champions Stoke. The Spotland club then dropped to 13th in 1927–28, 17th in 1928–29 and tenth in 1929–30.

=== Bradford City ===
He left Rochdale to become manager of Bradford City, taking over from the club's most successful manager, Peter O'Rourke, in July 1930. During his five years at Valley Parade, he maintained the club's position in the Second Division. Still, he had offered to resign at the end of 1933–34 before agreeing to see out the final two years of his contract. They tallied 44 points in 1930–31, 45 points in 1931–32, 41 points in 1932–33, and 46 points in 1933–34. With the club struggling above the relegation zone in 1934–35, he left the "Bantams" in March 1935 and was replaced by Dick Ray.

=== Fulham ===
In 1935, he joined Fulham as manager, replacing Jimmy Hogan. He took the club to the semi-finals of the FA Cup in 1935–36, where a 2–1 defeat to Sheffield United at Molineux cost them a place in the 1936 FA Cup final. He then led the "Cottagers" to mid-table finishes in the Second Division in the 1936–37, 1937–38, and 1938–39 campaigns. He remained in charge at Craven Cottage throughout World War II, and led the club to two further mid-table finishes in 1946–47 and 1947–48. He was still manager at the time of his death in September 1948, a month before his 60th birthday. The team he built went on to win the Second Division championship in the same season under the stewardship of director Frank Osborne.

== Personal life ==
Peart was married to Margaret Joan Fraser; their son was the doctor and clinical researcher Sir Stanley Peart.

== Career statistics ==
=== Playing statistics ===
Appearances and goals by club, season and competition
Club	Season	League			FA Cup		Total	
Club	Season	Division	Apps	Goals	Apps	Goals	Apps	Goals
Sheffield United	1907–08	First Division	4	2	0	0	4	2
Sheffield United	1908–09	First Division	21	6	1	0	22	6
Sheffield United	1909–10	First Division	2	0	0	0	2	0
Sheffield United	Total		27	8	1	0	28	8
Stoke	1910–11	Birmingham & District League; Southern League Division Two	21	31	2	3	23	34
Stoke	1911–12	Southern League Division One	23	7	1	0	24	7
Stoke	Total		44	38	3	3	47	41
Newcastle United	1911–12	First Division	8	3	0	0	8	3
Newcastle United	1912–13	First Division	9	3	0	0	9	3
Newcastle United	Total		17	6	0	0	17	6
Notts County	1912–13	First Division	11	7	0	0	11	7
Notts County	1913–14	First Division	30	28	1	1	31	29
Notts County	1914–15	First Division	32	11	1	0	33	11
Notts County	1919–20	First Division	9	5	0	0	9	5
Notts County	Total		82	51	2	1	84	52
Birmingham	1919–20	Second Division	3	0	0	0	3	0
Derby County	1919–20	First Division	9	1	0	0	9	1
Port Vale	1921–22	Second Division	7	0	0	0	7	0
Norwich City	1922–23	Third Division South	21	6	3	2	24	8
Rochdale	1922–23	Third Division North	9	4	0	0	9	4
Rochdale	1922–23	Third Division North	12	6	1	0	13	6
Rochdale	Total		21	10	1	0	22	10
Career total			231	120	10	6	241	126

=== Managerial statistics ===
Managerial record by team and tenure
Team	From	To	Record				
Team	From	To	G	W	D	L	Win %
Rochdale	1 February 1923	31 July 1930	317	152	58	107	47.95
Bradford City	31 July 1930	1 March 1935	208	79	52	77	37.98
Fulham	1 May 1935	1 September 1948	275	104	71	100	37.82
Total			800	335	181	284	41.88

== Honours ==
Stoke City

- Birmingham & District League: 1910–11
- Southern Football League Division Two second-place promotion: 1910–11

Notts County

- Football League Second Division: 1913–14
