= Francis Hobson =

English footballer

Personal information
- Full name: Francis James Walter Hobson
- Date of birth: 1889
- Place of birth: Stoke-upon-Trent, England
- Date of death: 1931 (aged 42)
- Place of death: Stafford, England
- Position: Midfielder

Senior career*
Years	Team	Apps	(Gls)
- Smallthorne
1910–1911	Stoke	1	(0)
1911–19??	Rocester		
- * Club domestic league appearances and goals

Francis James Walter Hobson (1889–1931) was an English footballer who played for Stoke.

== Career ==
Hobson was born in Stoke-upon-Trent and played amateur football with Smallthorne before joining Stoke in 1910. He played in one first team match which came in a 4–0 win over Stafford Rangers during the 1910–11 season before returning to amateur football with Rocester.

== Career statistics ==
Appearances and goals by club, season and competition
Club	Season	League		FA Cup		Total	
Club	Season	Apps	Goals	Apps	Goals	Apps	Goals
Stoke	1910–11	1	0	0	0	1	0
Career total		1	0	0	0	1	0
