= Bob Hamnett =

English footballer

Personal information
- Full name: Robert Hamnett
- Date of birth: 1889
- Place of birth: Manchester, England
- Date of death: 1967 (aged 78)
- Place of death: Chester, England
- Position: Forward

Senior career*
Years	Team	Apps	(Gls)
- Fenton
1913–1914	Stoke	5	(2)
1914–19??	Ashton Rangers		
- * Club domestic league appearances and goals

Robert Hamnett (1889 – 1967) was an English footballer who played for Stoke.

== Career ==
Hamnett was born in Manchester and began his career playing for Fenton in Stoke-upon-Trent. He joined Stoke for the 1913–14 season playing five times and scoring twice both coming in a 2–1 win away at Welsh side Mardy.

== Career statistics ==
Appearances and goals by club, season and competition
Club	Season	League		FA Cup		Total	
Club	Season	Apps	Goals	Apps	Goals	Apps	Goals
Stoke	1913–14	5	2	0	0	5	2
Career total		5	2	0	0	5	2
