= George Roche (English footballer) =

English footballer

Personal information
- Full name: George Roche
- Date of birth: 1889
- Place of birth: Birkenhead, England
- Date of death: 1973 (aged 84)
- Place of death: Liverpool, England
- Position: Midfielder

Senior career*
Years	Team	Apps	(Gls)
–	Northern Nomads		
1909–1910	Preston North End	3	(0)
–	Liverpool University		
1912–1913	Stoke	3	(0)
1913–19??	Lancaster City		
- * Club domestic league appearances and goals

George Roche (1889–1973) was an English footballer who played for Preston North End and Stoke.

== Career ==
Rocahe was born in Birkenhead and played for Northern Nomads before joining Preston North End in 1909. He only played three matches for Preston before quitting to join the University of Liverpool and whilst studying played for the university football team. He joined Stoke in 1912 and made three appearances for the club in 1912–13. He returned to amateur football with Lancaster City.

== Career statistics ==
Club	Season	League			FA Cup		Total	
Club	Season	Division	Apps	Goals	Apps	Goals	Apps	Goals
Preston North End	1909–10	First Division	3	0	0	0	3	0
Stoke	1912–13	Southern League Division One	3	0	0	0	3	0
Career total			6	0	0	0	6	0
