= George Smart (footballer) =

English footballer

Personal information
- Full name: George Winston Smart
- Date of birth: 1890
- Place of birth: Bristol, England
- Date of death: 1941 (aged 51)
- Place of death: Stafford, England
- Position: Defender

Senior career*
Years	Team	Apps	(Gls)
- Treharris
1911–1920	Stoke	51	(0)
1921	Stafford Rangers		
- * Club domestic league appearances and goals

George Winston Smart (1890–1941) was an English footballer who played for Stoke.

== Career ==
Smart was born in Bristol and began his career with Welsh side Treharris before joining Stoke in 1911. He played 30 matches in 1911–12 and 15 in 1912–13. He then played for the club during World War I and played four matches in the Football League in 1919–20. He later played for Stafford Rangers.

== Career statistics ==
Club	Season	League			FA Cup		Total	
Club	Season	Division	Apps	Goals	Apps	Goals	Apps	Goals
Stoke	1911–12	Southern League Division One	29	0	1	0	30	0
Stoke	1912–13	Southern League Division One	15	0	0	0	15	0
Stoke	1913–14	Southern League Division Two	3	0	0	0	3	0
Stoke	1914–15	Southern League Division Two	0	0	0	0	0	0
Stoke	1919–20	Second Division	4	0	0	0	4	0
Career Total			51	0	1	0	52	0
