= Jack Baxter (footballer) =

English footballer

Personal information
- Full name: John Baxter
- Date of birth: 1889
- Place of birth: Wigan, England
- Date of death: 1951 (aged 62)
- Position: Goalkeeper

Senior career*
Years	Team	Apps	(Gls)
1905	Burslem		
1906	Liverpool Road		
1908	Congleton White Star		
1909	Tunstall Park		
1910	Derby County	0	(0)
1910–1911	Stoke	6	(0)
1911–19??	Macclesfield Town		
- * Club domestic league appearances and goals

John Baxter (1889–1951) was an English footballer who played for Stoke.

== Career ==
Baxter was born in Wigan and played amateur football in Staffordshire with Burslem, Liverpool Road, Congleton White Star and Tunstall Park before joining Derby County. After an unsuccessful spell in Derby, Baxter joined Stoke and played six times for the "Potters" during the 1910–11 season. He later played for Macclesfield Town.

== Career statistics ==
Club	Season	League		FA Cup		Total	
Club	Season	Apps	Goals	Apps	Goals	Apps	Goals
Stoke	1910–11	6	0	0	0	6	0
Career total		6	0	0	0	6	0
