= Harry Davies (footballer, born 1888) =

English footballer

Personal information
- Full name: Harold Donald Davies
- Date of birth: 1888
- Place of birth: Pendleton, Lancashire, England
- Date of death: 1958 (aged 70)
- Place of death: Germany
- Position: Midfielder

Senior career*
Years	Team	Apps	(Gls)
- Lancaster Wanderers
1913–1914	Stoke	1	(0)
1914–19??	North Staffs Nomads		
- * Club domestic league appearances and goals

Harold Donald Davies (1888 – 1958) was an English footballer who played for Stoke.

== Career ==
Davies was born in Pendleton, Lancashire and played amateur football with Lancaster Wanderers before joining Stoke in 1913. He played in one first team match which came in a 5–1 win over Treharris Athletic during the 1913–14 season before returning to amateur football with North Staffs Nomads.

== Career statistics ==
Club	Season	League		FA Cup		Total	
Club	Season	Apps	Goals	Apps	Goals	Apps	Goals
Stoke	1913–14	1	0	0	0	1	0
Career total		1	0	0	0	1	0
