= 1910–11 Stoke F.C. season =

Stoke
1910–11 season
- Chairman: Mr Rev. A Hurst
- Manager: Alfred Barker
- Stadium: Victoria Ground
- Birmingham & District League: 1st (47 points)
- Southern League Division Two: 2nd (35 points)
- FA Cup: First Round
- Top goalscorer: League: Jack Peart & Alf Smith (31); All: Alf Smith (35)
- Highest home attendance: 11,000 vs Aston Villa Reserves (25 March 1911)
- Lowest home attendance: 2,500 vs Stourbridge (25 February 1911)
- Average home league attendance: 6,800
Home colours	Away colours

The 1910–11 season was Stoke's third and final season in the Birmingham & District League and second in the Southern Football League.

Stoke again played in two league competitions in 1910–11 and were very successful in both. They won the Birmingham & District League and also gained promotion to the Southern Football League Division One after finishing runner-up to Reading on goal average.

== Season review ==
=== League ===
Progress was being made slowly, and the directors were able to spend money on new players to strengthen the squad, whilst at the same time the club decided to remain in two league competitions. One major acquisition in the summer of 1910 was forward Jack Peart from Sheffield United. He made a brilliant impact, scoring 31 goals in just 21 matches before breaking his leg against Crewe Alexandra in December 1910. Stoke also re-signed goalkeeper Arthur Cartlidge for £315 a lot of money for a 'keeper in 1910 as Stoke's finances began to improve.

Stoke played 59 competitive fixtures in 1910–11. They won the Birmingham & District League and gained promotion from the Southern Football League Division Two as runners-up. A total of 167 goals were scored in the 56 league matches with the two Smiths Alf and William scoring 58 between them. They were numerous high-scoring victories including a 10–0 win over Halesowen Town, an 8–0 away win at Chesham Town and an 8–1 home win over Kettering Town. Stoke also hit six on five occasions.

With Stoke now in a tougher competition the directors decided that Stoke should leave their reserve side to play in the Birmingham & District League and let their first team concentrate on the Southern League.

=== FA Cup ===
After fine qualifying round wins over Worcester City (7–0) and Lincoln City (4–0), Stoke lost 2–1 in the first round to Manchester City.

== Final league table ==
=== Birmingham & District League ===
Pos	Team	Pld	W	D	L	GF	GA	GAv	Pts
1	Stoke	34	24	2	8	95	48	1.979	50
2	Aston Villa Reserves	34	22	4	8	97	41	2.366	48
3	Walsall	34	20	6	8	60	44	1.364	46
4	Wrexham	34	17	7	10	74	52	1.423	41
5	Crewe Alexandra	34	16	8	10	85	61	1.393	40
6	Stourbridge	34	16	6	12	82	54	1.519	38
7	Worcester City	34	17	4	13	77	79	0.975	38
8	Wellington Town	34	15	7	12	65	62	1.048	37
9	West Bromwich Albion Reserves	34	13	8	13	54	58	0.931	34
10	Dudley Town	34	13	7	14	56	67	0.836	33
11	Shrewsbury Town	34	14	4	16	61	74	0.824	32
12	Wednesbury Old Athletic	34	14	2	18	61	82	0.744	30
13	Wolverhampton Wanderers Reserves	34	12	5	17	69	75	0.920	29
14	Brierley Hill Alliance	36	10	9	17	63	75	0.840	29
15	Birmingham Reserves	34	11	4	19	73	92	0.793	26
16	Stafford Rangers	34	11	4	19	45	73	0.616	26
17	Kidderminster Harriers	34	6	8	20	37	66	0.561	20
18	Halesowen	34	6	3	25	48	99	0.485	15

=== Southern Football League Division Two ===
Pos	Team	Pld	W	D	L	GF	GA	GAv	Pts
1	Reading	22	16	3	3	55	11	5.000	35
2	Stoke	22	17	1	4	72	21	3.429	35
3	Merthyr Town	22	15	3	4	52	22	2.364	33
4	Cardiff City	22	12	4	6	48	29	1.655	28
5	Croydon Common	22	11	3	8	61	26	2.346	25
6	Treharris	22	10	3	9	38	31	1.226	23
7	Aberdare	22	9	5	8	38	33	1.152	23
8	Ton Pentre	22	10	3	9	44	40	1.100	23
9	Walsall	22	7	4	11	37	41	0.902	18
10	Kettering	22	6	1	15	34	68	0.500	13
11	Chesham Town	22	1	3	18	16	97	0.165	5
12	Salisbury City	22	0	3	19	16	92	0.174	3

== Results ==
Stoke's score comes first

=== Legend ===
Win	Draw	Loss

=== Birmingham & District League ===
Match	Date	Opponent	Venue	Result	Attendance	Scorers
1	3 September 1910	Wellington Town	A	1–1	1,500	Turner
2	10 September 1910	Worcester City	A	1–4	2,000	Peart
3	17 September 1910	Birmingham Reserves	A	3–2	2,000	Peart (2), Baddeley
4	24 September 1910	West Bromwich Albion Reserves	H	2–0	5,000	Peart (2)
5	1 October 1910	Stafford Rangers	A	3–0	2,500	Peart, A Smith, Turner
6	8 October 1910	Dudley Town	H	5–2	10,000	Peart (3), A Smith, W Smith
7	15 October 1910	Shrewsbury Town	H	3–0	8,000	Peart, W Smith, Baddeley
8	22 October 1910	Stourbridge	A	1–2	3,000	Thornton
9	29 October 1910	Walsall	H	3–4	7,000	Peart (2), A Smith
10	5 November 1910	Kidderminster Harriers	A	2–2	2,000	Peart, A Smith
11	12 November 1910	Wrexham	H	6–2	7,500	Peart (2), A Smith, Baddeley, Turner (2)
12	26 November 1910	Wolverhampton Wanderers Reserves	H	6–1	5,000	Peart (3), A Smith (2), Turner
13	10 December 1910	Crewe Alexandra	H	1–0	10,000	S Baddeley
14	17 December 1910	Wednesbury Old Athletic	A	0–1	2,000	
15	24 December 1910	Brierley Hill Alliance	H	4–1	2,500	A Smith (2), Leese, Baddeley
16	31 December 1910	Wellington Town	H	6–1	2,500	A Smith (3), Baddeley, Brown
17	7 January 1911	Worcester City	H	2–1	8,000	Leese, Boulton
18	21 January 1911	Birmingham Reserves	H	6–2	3,000	W Smith (2), Baddeley, S Baddeley, Hay (2)
19	28 January 1911	West Bromwich Albion Reserves	A	2–1	3,500	W Smith, A Smith
20	11 February 1911	Dudley Town	A	0–1	1,000	
21	18 February 1911	Shrewsbury Town	A	1–0	2,000	Leese
22	25 February 1911	Stourbridge	H	2–1	2,500	W Smith, A Smith
23	4 March 1911	Walsall	A	4–2	3,500	W Smith, A Smith, Baddeley, Leigh
24	11 March 1911	Kidderminster Harriers	H	5–0	6,500	W Smith, A Smith (2), Leese (2)
25	18 March 1911	Wrexham	A	1–7	3,000	Hardman
26	25 March 1911	Aston Villa Reserves	H	2–1	11,000	W Smith, A Smith
27	1 April 1911	Wolverhampton Wanderers Reserves	A	3–2	2,000	W Smith, A Smith, S Baddeley
28	3 April 1911	Halesowen	A	1–0	2,000	Hay
29	8 April 1911	Halesowen	H	10–0	10,000	A Smith (5), Leese, W Smith, Savage (3)
30	15 April 1911	Crewe Alexandra	A	0–1	12,000	
31	17 April 1911	Stafford Rangers	H	4–0	12,000	W Smith (2), Turner, Paxton
32	22 April 1911	Wednesbury Old Athletic	H	2–0	6,000	A Smith, Hardman
33	24 April 1911	Aston Villa Reserves	A	0–4	3,000	
34	29 April 1911	Brierley Hill Alliance	A	3–2	2,000	Leese, Griffiths, Hardman

=== Southern Football League Division Two ===
Match	Date	Opponent	Venue	Result	Attendance	Scorers
1	1 September 1910	Ton Pentre	A	3–2	3,000	Peart (2), Griffiths
2	12 September 1910	Treharris Athletic	A	4–1	3,000	Peart (3), Baddeley
3	3 October 1910	Ton Pentre	H	3–0	3,000	Peart, Griffiths (2)
4	12 October 1910	Croydon Common	A	1–2	2,000	Griffiths
5	17 October 1910	Aberdare	A	4–2	3,000	W Smith (2), Peart, Brown
6	24 October 1910	Kettering Town	H	8–1	3,000	Peart (3), Brown (2), Turner, Baddeley, W Smith
7	5 November 1910	Chesham Town	H	3–0	2,000	Horrocks (3)
8	7 November 1910	Croydon Common	H	6–2	1,000	Peart (2), Baddeley (2), W Smith, A Smith
9	14 November 1910	Aberdare	H	1–0	3,000	Peart
10	12 December 1910	Walsall	H	4–0	3,000	W Smith (2), Brown, Griffiths
11	27 December 1910	Cardiff City	H	5–0	9,000	W Smith (2), Griffiths, Baddeley (2)
12	2 January 1911	Salisbury City	H	6–0	3,000	A Smith (3), Griffiths (2), Brown
13	30 January 1911	Merthyr Town	H	4–1	5,000	W Smith, Griffiths, Baddeley, Boulton
14	4 February 1911	Chesham Town	A	8–0	2,000	W Smith (3), Boulton (3), Turner, Baddeley
15	20 February 1911	Reading	H	1–0	5,000	Boulton
16	8 March 1911	Salisbury City	A	2–2	1,000	Turner, Baddeley
17	20 March 1911	Walsall	A	0–1	2,000	
18	27 March 1911	Merthyr Town	A	0–2	8,000	
19	10 April 1911	Treharris Athletic	H	2–0	2,000	Savage, Leese
20	14 April 1911	Reading	A	0–2	10,000	
21	18 April 1911	Cardiff City	A	2–1	4,000	W Smith, A Smith
22	27 April 1911	Kettering Town	A	5–1	5,000	W Smith, A Smith, Leese, Baddeley (2)

=== FA Cup ===
Round	Date	Opponent	Venue	Result	Attendance	Scorers
4QR	19 November 1910	Worcester City	H	7–0	6,000	Peart (2), A Smith (2), Baddeley (3)
5QR	3 November 1910	Lincoln City	H	4–0	12,000	Peart, A Smith, Griffiths, W Smith
R1	14 January 1911	Manchester City	H	1–2	23,883	A Smith

== Squad statistics ==
Pos.	Name	League		FA Cup		Total	
Pos.	Name	Apps	Goals	Apps	Goals	Apps	Goals
GK	(England) Horace Bailey	1	0	0	0	1	0
GK	(England) Jack Baxter	6	0	0	0	6	0
GK	(England) Arthur Cartlidge	12	0	0	0	12	0
GK	(England) Richard Herron	5	0	0	0	5	0
GK	(England) Fred Rathbone	4	0	0	0	4	0
GK	(England) Jack Robinson	28	0	3	0	31	0
DF	(England) Charles James	3	0	0	0	3	0
DF	(England) Dick Hawe	1	0	0	0	1	0
DF	(Scotland) James Hay	29	3	1	0	30	3
DF	(Wales) Harry Holt	1	0	0	0	1	0
DF	(England) Ernest Mullineux	40	0	2	0	42	0
DF	(England) George Turner	42	9	3	0	45	9
DF	(England) Jimmy Williams	1	0	0	0	1	0
MF	(England) Sam Baddeley	53	3	3	0	56	3
MF	(England) William Bradbury	28	0	3	0	31	0
MF	(England) John Brown	15	7	1	0	16	7
MF	(England) Archie Dyke	1	0	0	0	1	0
MF	(England) Victor Hall	1	0	0	0	1	0
MF	(England) Harold Hardman	8	3	0	0	8	3
MF	(England) Francis Hobson	1	0	0	0	1	0
MF	(England) Vic Horrocks	1	3	0	0	1	3
MF	(Wales) George Latham	8	0	0	0	8	0
MF	(England) Harry Leese	50	9	3	0	53	9
MF	(England) Albert Pitt	8	0	0	0	8	0
MF	(England) James Swarbrick	3	0	0	0	3	0
MF	(England) Tom Thornton	20	1	0	0	20	1
FW	(England) Amos Baddeley	42	18	3	3	45	21
FW	(England) Ernest Boulton	11	6	0	0	11	6
FW	(England) Thomas Greaves	1	0	0	0	1	0
FW	(England) Arthur Griffiths	44	10	3	1	47	11
FW	(England) Harry Leigh	19	1	0	0	19	1
FW	(England) John Paxton	3	1	0	0	3	1
FW	(England) Jack Peart	21	31	2	3	23	34
FW	(England) Albert Savage	9	4	0	0	9	4
FW	(England) Alf Smith	41	31	3	4	44	35
FW	(England) William Smith	53	27	3	1	56	28
