= Richard Coates (footballer) =

English footballer

Personal information
- Full name: Richard Coates
- Date of birth: 1889
- Place of birth: Stoke-upon-Trent, England
- Date of death: 1960 (aged 61)
- Place of death: Chester, England
- Position: Forward

Senior career*
Years	Team	Apps	(Gls)
- Mardy
1912–1913	Stoke	1	(0)
1914–19??	Annfield Plain		
- * Club domestic league appearances and goals

Richard Coates (1889 – 1960) was an English footballer who played for Stoke.

== Career ==
Coates was born in Stoke-upon-Trent and played amateur football with Welsh club Mardy before joining Stoke in 1912. He played in one first team match which came in a 1–0 defeat to Coventry City during the 1912–13 season before returning to amateur football with Annfield Plain.

== Career statistics ==
Appearances and goals by club, season and competition
Club	Season	League		FA Cup		Total	
Club	Season	Apps	Goals	Apps	Goals	Apps	Goals
Stoke	1912–13	1	0	0	0	1	0
Career total		1	0	0	0	1	0
