= John Brown (footballer, born 1888) =

English footballer

Personal information
- Date of birth: 1888
- Place of birth: Liverpool, England
- Position: Outside right

Senior career*
| Years | Team | Apps | (Gls) |
- Orrell
| 1908–1909 | Manchester City | 6 | (0) |
| 1910–1911 | Stoke | 15 | (7) |
- * Club domestic league appearances and goals

John P Brown (born 1888) was an English footballer who played for Manchester City and Stoke.

== Career ==
Brown was born in Liverpool and played for Orrell before joining Manchester City in 1908. He played six times for Man City before joining Stoke in 1910. Brown played 15 matches for Stoke during the 1910–11 season scoring seven goals.

== Career statistics ==
Appearances and goals by club, season and competition
| Club | Season | League | | | FA Cup | | Total | |
| Club | Season | Division | Apps | Goals | Apps | Goals | Apps | Goals |
|---|---|---|---|---|---|---|---|---|
| Manchester City | 1908–09 | Second Division | 4 | 0 | 0 | 0 | 4 | 0 |
| Manchester City | 1909–10 | Second Division | 2 | 0 | 0 | 0 | 2 | 0 |
| Stoke | 1910–11 | Birmingham & District League / Southern League Division Two | 15 | 7 | 1 | 0 | 16 | 7 |
| Career total | | | 21 | 7 | 1 | 0 | 22 | 7 |
