= John Lenaghan =

English footballer

Personal information
- Full name: John Lenaghan
- Date of birth: 1888
- Place of birth: Liverpool, England
- Date of death: 1951 (aged 63)
- Place of death: Whitchurch, Shropshire, England
- Position: Forward

Senior career*
Years	Team	Apps	(Gls)
19??–1908	Mardy		
1910–1913	Stoke	37	(10)
1913–19??	Chirk AAA		
- * Club domestic league appearances and goals

John Lenaghan (1888 – 1951) was an English footballer who played for Stoke.

== Career ==
Lenaghan was born in Liverpool and began his career with Welsh side Mardy before joining Stoke in 1910. He spent two seasons at the Victoria Ground scoring 10 goals in 37 appearances. He then returned to Welsh football with Chirk AAA.

== Career statistics ==
Appearances and goals by club, season and competition
Club	Season	League		FA Cup		Total	
Club	Season	Apps	Goals	Apps	Goals	Apps	Goals
Stoke	1911–12	18	8	0	0	18	8
Stoke	1912–13	19	2	0	0	19	2
Career total		37	10	0	0	37	10
