= Tom Revill =

English cricketer and footballer

Personal information
- Full name: Thomas Fredrick Revill
- Date of birth: 1892
- Place of birth: Bolsover, England
- Date of death: 1979 (aged 86–87)
- Place of death: Mansfield, England
- Position: Forward

Senior career*
Years	Team	Apps	(Gls)
1911–1912	Chesterfield	17	(19)
1911–1914	Stoke	70	(23)
1914–1915	Chesterfield		
- * Club domestic league appearances and goals

Thomas Frederick Revill (9 May 1892 – 29 March 1979) was an English cricketer and footballer.

== Football career ==
He began with youth sides in his native Bolsover before joining Chesterfield in 1911. He scored 19 goals in 17 Midland League games for Chesterfield, and was transferred to Stoke for £200 in February 1912. He returned to Bolsover in 1914 to play for the local colliery team and turned out with Chesterfield as a war guest during the 1915–16 and 1916–17 seasons. He made 74 appearances for Stoke scoring 24 goals.

== Cricket career ==
Tom Revill
Personal information
- Batting: Right-handed
- Bowling: Leg-break, googly
- Relatives: Alan Revill (son)

Domestic team information
- Years: Team
- 1913–1920: Derbyshire
- FC debut: 14 July 1913 Derbyshire v Somerset
- Last FC: 22 May 1920 Derbyshire v Warwickshire

Career statistics
Competition	First-class
Matches	11
Runs scored	231
Batting average	14.43
100s/50s	0/1
Top score	65*
Catches/stumpings	6/–
- Source: CricketArchive, January 2012

Revill was born at Bolsover, Derbyshire. He made his debut for Derbyshire against Somerset in July 1913 and played one more match that season. After World War I he returned to Derbyshire for eight matches in 1919 and made his top score of 65 not out against Northamptonshire. He played just one game in 1920.

Revill was a left-hand batsman and played 20 innings in 11 first-class matches with an average of 14.43 and a top score of 65 not out. He was a leg-break and googly bowler but did not perform in the first-class game.

Revill died at Mansfield, Nottinghamshire at the age of 86. His son Alan Revill also played cricket for Derbyshire.

== Career statistics ==
Appearances and goals by club, season and competition
Club	Season	League			FA Cup		Total	
Club	Season	Division	Apps	Goals	Apps	Goals	Apps	Goals
Stoke	1911–12	Southern League Division One	14	6	0	0	14	6
Stoke	1912–13	Southern League Division One	34	8	2	1	36	9
Stoke	1913–14	Southern League Division Two	22	9	2	0	24	9
Career total			70	23	4	1	74	24
