= James Hay (footballer) =

Scottish footballer

Personal information
- Full name: James Hay
- Date of birth: 1876
- Place of birth: Lanark, Scotland
- Date of death: 1940 (aged 64)
- Position: Full back

Senior career*
Years	Team	Apps	(Gls)
1900	Renfrew Victoria		
1901–1907	Barnsley	146	(0)
1908–1909	Chesterfield	37	(0)
1909–1911	Stoke	70	(3)
Total		253	(3)
- * Club domestic league appearances and goals

James Hay (1876–1940) was a footballer who played in the Football League for Barnsley and Chesterfield Town and in the Southern League for Stoke.

== Career ==
Hay was born in Lanark and played for Renfrew Victoria before joining English Second Division side Barnsley in 1901. Hay spent seven seasons with the "Tykes" making 159 appearances scoring once which came in an FA Cup match against Swindon Town. He joined Chesterfield in 1908 and spent the 1908–09 season at Saltergate but left at the end of the season after they failed to gain re-election. He signed for Stoke in 1909 who at the time were playing in the Southern League and spent three seasons at the Victoria Ground making 70 appearances scoring three goals.

== Career statistics ==
Appearances and goals by club, season and competition
Club	Season	League			FA Cup		Total	
Club	Season	Division	Apps	Goals	Apps	Goals	Apps	Goals
Barnsley	1901–02	Second Division	19	0	0	0	19	0
Barnsley	1902–03	Second Division	9	0	1	1	10	1
Barnsley	1903–04	Second Division	0	0	0	0	0	0
Barnsley	1904–05	Second Division	21	0	3	0	24	0
Barnsley	1905–06	Second Division	31	0	4	0	35	0
Barnsley	1906–07	Second Division	34	0	4	0	38	0
Barnsley	1907–08	Second Division	32	0	1	0	33	0
Barnsley	Total		146	0	13	1	159	1
Chesterfield	1908–09	Second Division	37	0	2	0	39	0
Stoke	1909–10	Birmingham & District League / Southern League Division Two	33	0	0	0	33	0
Stoke	1910–10	Birmingham & District League / Southern League Division Two	29	3	1	0	30	3
Stoke	1911–12	Southern League Division One	8	0	0	0	8	0
Stoke	Total		70	3	1	0	71	3
Career Total			253	3	16	1	269	4
