= Bert Gadsden =

English footballer

Personal information
- Full name: Herbert Gadsden
- Date of birth: 12 September 1893
- Place of birth: Nottingham, England
- Date of death: 1973 (aged 80)
- Place of death: Mansfield, England
- Position: Goalkeeper

Senior career*
Years	Team	Apps	(Gls)
–	Standen Hill Victoria		
1912–1915	Stoke	69	(0)
1919–1922	Mansfield Invicta		
1922–1930	Notts Rangers		
- * Club domestic league appearances and goals

Herbert Gadsden (12 September 1893 – 1973) was an English footballer who played for Stoke.

== Career ==
Gadsden was born in Nottingham and played amateur football with Standen Hill Victoria before joining Stoke in 1912. He became Stoke's first choice goalkeeper in 1912–13 and 1913–14 before losing his place to Richard Herron in 1914–15. After World War I Gadsden returned to amateur football with Mansfield Invicta and Notts Rangers.

== Career statistics ==
Appearances and goals by club, season and competition
Club	Season	League		FA Cup		Total	
Club	Season	Apps	Goals	Apps	Goals	Apps	Goals
Stoke	1912–13	33	0	2	0	35	0
Stoke	1913–14	30	0	3	0	33	0
Stoke	1914–15	6	0	2	0	8	0
Career total		69	0	7	0	76	0
