= Henry Hargreaves (footballer) =

English footballer

Personal information
- Full name: Henry Hargreaves
- Date of birth: 1893
- Place of birth: Stoke-upon-Trent, England
- Date of death: 9 December 1917 (aged 24)
- Place of death: Pas-de-Calais, France
- Position: Midfielder

Senior career*
| Years | Team | Apps | (Gls) |
- Newcastle Town
| 1912–1915 | Stoke | 38 | (4) |
- * Club domestic league appearances and goals

Henry Hargreaves (1893 – 9 December 1917) was an English footballer who played for Stoke.

== Career ==
Hargreaves was born in Stoke-upon-Trent and played for Newcastle Town before joining Stoke in 1912. He played 42 times for Stoke in three seasons with the club scoring five goals before being called up to the army in 1916 during the First World War. He was killed in action in France on 9 December 1917, serving as a private in the North Staffordshire Regiment.

== Career statistics ==
Appearances and goals by club, season and competition
| Club | Season | League | | | FA Cup | | Total | |
| Club | Season | Division | Apps | Goals | Apps | Goals | Apps | Goals |
|---|---|---|---|---|---|---|---|---|
| Stoke | 1912–13 | Southern League First Division | 2 | 0 | 0 | 0 | 2 | 0 |
| Stoke | 1913–14 | Southern League Second Division | 9 | 1 | 0 | 0 | 9 | 1 |
| Stoke | 1914–15 | Southern League Second Division | 23 | 4 | 4 | 1 | 27 | 5 |
| Career total | | | 38 | 4 | 4 | 1 | 42 | 5 |
