= Ernest Boulton (footballer) =

English footballer

Personal information
- Full name: Ernest Boulton
- Date of birth: 1889
- Place of birth: Stoke-upon-Trent, England
- Date of death: 1959 (aged 70)
- Place of death: Stoke-on-Trent, England
- Position: Forward

Senior career*
Years	Team	Apps	(Gls)
1910–1911	Stoke	11	(6)
- * Club domestic league appearances and goals

Ernest Boulton (1889 – 1959) was an English footballer who played for Stoke.

== Career ==
Boulton was born in Stoke-upon-Trent and played for local side, Stoke where he scored six goals in eleven matches during the 1910–11 season.

== Career statistics ==
Club	Season	League		FA Cup		Total	
Club	Season	Apps	Goals	Apps	Goals	Apps	Goals
Stoke	1910–11	11	6	0	0	11	6
Career Total		11	6	0	0	11	6
