= William Smith (footballer, born 1886) =

English footballer (1886–1956)

Personal information
- Full name: William Ernest Smith
- Date of birth: 1886
- Place of birth: Lostock Hall, England
- Position: Forward

Senior career*
Years	Team	Apps	(Gls)
- Darwen
- Nelson
1908	Bradford City	3	(0)
1908–1909	Huddersfield Town		
1909–1913	Stoke	128	(57)
1914	Preston North End	0	(0)
Total		131	(57)
- * Club domestic league appearances and goals

William Edward Smith (1886–1956) was an English footballer who played for Bradford City and Stoke.

== Career ==
Smith started his football career at his local sides in Lancashire, Darwen and Nelson before joining Bradford City and Huddersfield Town. In 1909 he joined Stoke who at the time were playing in the Southern Football League after being liquidated in 1908 which forced the club to drop out of the Football League. He made a perfect start as he scored four goals on his debut in an 11–0 win against Merthyr Tydfil. He went on to be a prolific goal scorer for Stoke and scored 60 goals in 138 matches.

== Career statistics ==
Appearances and goals by club, season and competition
Club	Season	League			FA Cup		Birmingham Cup		Total	
Club	Season	Division	Apps	Goals	Apps	Goals	Apps	Goals	Apps	Goals
Bradford City	1908–09	First Division	3	0	0	0	—		3	0
Stoke	1909–10	Birmingham & District League / Southern League Division Two	37	18	6	1	3	2	46	21
Stoke	1910–11	Birmingham & District League / Southern League Division Two	53	27	3	1	—		56	28
Stoke	1911–12	Southern League Division One	29	9	1	1	—		30	10
Stoke	1912–13	Southern League Division One	5	3	0	0	—		5	3
Stoke	1913–14	Southern League Division Two	4	0	0	0	—		4	0
Stoke	Total		128	57	10	3	3	2	141	62
Career total			131	57	10	3	3	2	144	62
