= 1913–14 Stoke F.C. season =

Stoke
1913–14 season
- Chairman: Mr Rev. A Hurst
- Manager: Alfred Barker
- Stadium: Victoria Ground
- Southern League Division Two: 5th (40 Points)
- FA Cup: First Round
- Top goalscorer: League: Alf Smith (16); All: Billy Herbert & Alf Smith (16)
- Highest home attendance: 18,000 vs Luton Town (13 April 1914)
- Lowest home attendance: 3,000 vs Aberdare (3 January 1914)
- Average home league attendance: 6,566
Home colours

The 1913–14 season was Stoke's fifth season in the Southern Football League.

Stoke were now back in the poor quality Southern League Division Two and expectations were to gain an instant return to Division One. Stoke started the season well winning nine games in a row, however the team ran into poor form in the new year and ended up finishing 5th, 11 points from promotion. It was a bad performance and in April 1914 both chairman Mr Rev. A Hurst and manager Alfred Barker stepped down.

== Season review ==
=== League ===
Division Two of the Southern League for the 1913–14 season was made up of selection of poor Welsh clubs and a smattering of sides from around the London area, namely Luton Town, Brentford and Croydon Common. There was no money available, meaning the club had to rely on free transfers. There were still a number of new faces with the likes of former England international Fred Pentland joining from Halifax, James Bradley returning from Liverpool and Billy Herbert from Glossop. With Stoke doing well from the start of the season crowds were often good as Stoke embarked on a nine match winning run. However long distance travelling eventually caused Stoke problems and they lost their form and ended up finishing in a poor position of fifth.

The directors, obviously disappointed as were the players and supporters, at not winning promotion, vowed to continue to build the team despite having little money available. Alfred Barker was now under pressure from supporters and indeed some directors who questioned his wisdom to employ part-time staff. He and chairman A. Hurst both stepped down in April 1914. It was a sad way to see such key figures, responsible for saving the club, leave in such circumstances.

=== FA Cup ===
After progressing past Shrewsbury Town and Barrow, Stoke lost to Aston Villa in the first round.

== Final league table ==
| Pos | Team | Pld | W | D | L | GF | GA | GAv | Pts |
|---|---|---|---|---|---|---|---|---|---|
| 1 | Croydon Common | 30 | 23 | 5 | 2 | 76 | 14 | 5.429 | 51 |
| 2 | Luton Town | 30 | 24 | 3 | 3 | 92 | 22 | 4.182 | 51 |
| 3 | Brentford | 30 | 20 | 4 | 6 | 80 | 18 | 4.444 | 44 |
| 4 | Swansea Town | 30 | 20 | 4 | 6 | 66 | 25 | 2.640 | 44 |
| 5 | Stoke | 30 | 19 | 2 | 9 | 71 | 34 | 2.088 | 40 |
| 6 | Newport County | 30 | 14 | 8 | 8 | 49 | 38 | 1.289 | 36 |
| 7 | Mid Rhondda | 30 | 13 | 7 | 10 | 55 | 37 | 1.486 | 33 |
| 8 | Pontypridd | 30 | 14 | 5 | 11 | 43 | 38 | 1.132 | 33 |
| 9 | Llanelly | 30 | 12 | 4 | 14 | 45 | 37 | 1.216 | 28 |
| 10 | Barry | 30 | 9 | 8 | 13 | 44 | 70 | 0.629 | 26 |
| 11 | Abertillery | 30 | 8 | 4 | 18 | 44 | 51 | 0.863 | 20 |
| 12 | Ton Pentre | 30 | 8 | 4 | 18 | 33 | 61 | 0.541 | 20 |
| 13 | Mardy | 30 | 6 | 6 | 18 | 30 | 60 | 0.500 | 18 |
| 14 | Caerphilly | 30 | 4 | 7 | 19 | 21 | 103 | 0.204 | 15 |
| 15 | Aberdare | 30 | 4 | 5 | 21 | 33 | 87 | 0.379 | 13 |
| 16 | Treharris | 30 | 2 | 4 | 24 | 19 | 106 | 0.179 | 8 |

== Results ==
Stoke's score comes first

=== Legend ===
| Win | Draw | Loss |

=== Southern Football League Division Two ===
| Match | Date | Opponent | Venue | Result | Attendance | Scorers |
|---|---|---|---|---|---|---|
| 1 | 6 September 1913 | Croydon Common | H | 1–1 | 7,000 | Pentland |
| 2 | 13 September 1913 | Croydon Common | A | 0–2 | 6,000 | |
| 3 | 20 September 1913 | Mid Rhondda | A | 2–0 | 2,500 | Pentland, A Smith |
| 4 | 27 September 1913 | Ton Pentre | A | 2–1 | 4,000 | Pentland, Revill |
| 5 | 4 October 1913 | Abertillery | H | 3–0 | 4,000 | A Smith (2), Revill |
| 6 | 11 October 1913 | Treharris Athletic | A | 5–0 | 3,000 | Pentland, Herbert (3), Jones |
| 7 | 18 October 1913 | Llanelli | H | 2–1 | 10,000 | Pentland, Herbert |
| 8 | 1 November 1913 | Treharris Athletic | H | 5–1 | 7,000 | Revill (2), Herbert (pen), A Smith, Dyke |
| 9 | 8 November 1913 | Swansea Town | A | 3–2 | 3,000 | Herbert (2), A Smith |
| 10 | 15 November 1913 | Barry | H | 7–1 | 4,500 | Herbert, A Smith (2), Jones (2), Revill, D Smith |
| 11 | 22 November 1913 | Aberdare | A | 4–2 | 1,000 | Herbert, A Smith (3) |
| 12 | 6 December 1913 | Newport County | A | 2–3 | 3,000 | Turner (pen), A Smith |
| 13 | 25 December 1913 | Caerphilly | A | 5–1 | 3,000 | A Smith (3), D Smith (2) |
| 14 | 26 December 1913 | Caerphilly | H | 4–0 | 10,000 | Turner (pen), Revill, Bailey, Lean (o.g.) |
| 15 | 3 January 1914 | Aberdare | H | 4–1 | 10,000 | Herbert (3), Jenkins (o.g.) |
| 16 | 17 January 1914 | Brentford | A | 0–2 | 5,000 | |
| 17 | 24 January 1914 | Ton Pentre | H | 2–0 | 5,000 | Revill, Turner (pen) |
| 18 | 14 February 1914 | Mid Rhondda | H | 1–0 | 4,000 | Revill |
| 19 | 21 February 1914 | Abertillery | A | 0–1 | 3,500 | |
| 20 | 28 February 1914 | Brentford | H | 2–1 | 6,000 | D Smith, Turner (pen) |
| 21 | 14 March 1914 | Pontypridd | H | 5–1 | 4,000 | D Smith (2), Revill, A Smith, Jones |
| 22 | 17 March 1914 | Llanelli | A | 0–2 | 4,000 | |
| 23 | 21 March 1914 | Barry | A | 1–1 | 3,500 | Herbert |
| 24 | 28 March 1914 | Newport County | H | 2–0 | 4,000 | D Smith, Tempest |
| 25 | 4 April 1914 | Mardy | A | 2–1 | 1,000 | Hamnett (2) |
| 26 | 10 April 1914 | Luton Town | A | 1–2 | 5,000 | D Smith |
| 27 | 11 April 1914 | Mardy | H | 4–0 | 3,000 | D Smith (2), Watkin, Hargreaves |
| 28 | 13 April 1914 | Luton Town | H | 1–2 | 18,000 | Bradley |
| 29 | 18 April 1914 | Pontypridd | A | 1–4 | 2,000 | A Smith |
| 30 | 25 April 1914 | Swansea Town | H | 0–1 | 5,000 | |

=== FA Cup ===
| Round | Date | Opponent | Venue | Result | Attendance | Scorers |
|---|---|---|---|---|---|---|
| 4QR | 29 November 1913 | Shrewsbury Town | H | 2–0 | 5,000 | D Smith, Herbert |
| 5QR | 13 December 1913 | Barrow | H | 3–1 | 10,000 | Holmes, Herbert (2) |
| R1 | 10 January 1914 | Aston Villa | A | 0–4 | 26,094 | |

== Squad statistics ==
| Pos. | Name | League | | FA Cup | | Total | |
| Pos. | Name | Apps | Goals | Apps | Goals | Apps | Goals |
|---|---|---|---|---|---|---|---|
| GK | (England) Bert Gadsden | 30 | 0 | 3 | 0 | 33 | 0 |
| DF | (England) Richard Burton | 2 | 0 | 0 | 0 | 2 | 0 |
| DF | (England) Charles James | 1 | 0 | 0 | 0 | 1 | 0 |
| DF | (England) Jimmy McVay | 1 | 0 | 0 | 0 | 1 | 0 |
| DF | (England) Alec Milne | 25 | 0 | 3 | 0 | 28 | 0 |
| DF | (England) Ernest Mullineux | 5 | 0 | 1 | 0 | 6 | 0 |
| DF | (England) George Smart | 3 | 0 | 0 | 0 | 3 | 0 |
| DF | (England) George Turner | 29 | 4 | 3 | 0 | 32 | 4 |
| MF | (England) Sam Baddeley | 7 | 0 | 1 | 0 | 8 | 0 |
| MF | (England) James Bradley | 12 | 1 | 3 | 0 | 15 | 1 |
| MF | (England) Harry Davies | 1 | 0 | 0 | 0 | 1 | 0 |
| MF | (England) Archie Dyke | 15 | 1 | 3 | 0 | 18 | 1 |
| MF | (England) Reg Forester | 1 | 0 | 0 | 0 | 1 | 0 |
| MF | (England) Bob Hamnett | 5 | 2 | 0 | 0 | 5 | 2 |
| MF | (England) Henry Hargreaves | 9 | 1 | 0 | 0 | 9 | 1 |
| MF | (England) Crop Hawkins | 3 | 0 | 0 | 0 | 3 | 0 |
| MF | (Wales) Joe Jones | 23 | 4 | 0 | 0 | 23 | 4 |
| MF | (England) Charles Parker | 9 | 0 | 0 | 0 | 9 | 0 |
| MF | (England) Tancey Wharton | 17 | 0 | 2 | 0 | 19 | 0 |
| FW | (England) Tom Bailey | 15 | 1 | 2 | 0 | 17 | 1 |
| FW | (England) Albert Ellis | 3 | 0 | 0 | 0 | 3 | 0 |
| FW | (England) Billy Herbert | 24 | 13 | 3 | 3 | 27 | 16 |
| FW | (England) William Holmes | 2 | 0 | 2 | 1 | 4 | 1 |
| FW | (England) Fred Pentland | 7 | 5 | 0 | 0 | 7 | 5 |
| FW | (England) Tom Revill | 22 | 9 | 2 | 0 | 24 | 9 |
| FW | (England) Walter Rowlands | 1 | 0 | 0 | 0 | 1 | 0 |
| FW | (England) Alf Smith | 22 | 16 | 3 | 0 | 25 | 16 |
| FW | (England) Dick Smith | 15 | 10 | 1 | 1 | 16 | 11 |
| FW | (England) William Smith | 4 | 0 | 0 | 0 | 4 | 0 |
| FW | (England) Billy Tempest | 10 | 1 | 1 | 0 | 11 | 1 |
| FW | (England) Arthur Watkin | 7 | 1 | 0 | 0 | 7 | 1 |
| – | Own goals | – | 2 | – | 0 | – | 2 |
