= Fred McCarthy (footballer) =

English footballer

Personal information
- Full name: Frederick McCarthy
- Date of birth: 1890
- Place of birth: Liverpool, England
- Date of death: before 1980
- Position: Forward

Senior career*
Years	Team	Apps	(Gls)
	Bury	0	(0)
1914–1915	Stoke	7	(5)
–	Stafford Rangers		
- * Club domestic league appearances and goals

Frederick McCarthy (1890 – before 1980) was an English footballer who played for Stoke.

== Career ==
McCarthy was born in Liverpool and played football with Bury before joining Stoke in 1914. He spent the 1914–15 at Stoke where he scored nine goals in ten matches. He later played for Stafford Rangers.

== Career statistics ==
Club	Season	League		FA Cup		Total	
Club	Season	Apps	Goals	Apps	Goals	Apps	Goals
Stoke	1914–15	7	5	3	4	10	9
Career total		7	5	3	4	10	9
