= Arthur Cartlidge =

English footballer

Personal information
- Full name: Arthur Cartlidge
- Date of birth: 12 June 1880
- Place of birth: Stoke-upon-Trent, England
- Date of death: 1922 (aged 41–42)
- Height: 6 ft 0 in (1.83 m)
- Position: Goalkeeper

Senior career*
| Years | Team | Apps | (Gls) |
| 1897–1898 | Penkell Victoria | | |
| 1898–1899 | Market Drayton Town | | |
| 1899–1900 | Stoke | 10 | (0) |
| 1901–1908 | Bristol Rovers | 258 | (0) |
| 1908–1910 | Aston Villa | 52 | (0) |
| 1911–1912 | Stoke | 34 | (0) |
| 1912 | South Shields | | |
| Total | | 345 | (0) |
- * Club domestic league appearances and goals

Arthur Cartlidge (12 June 1880 – 1922) was an English footballer who played in the Football League for Aston Villa and Stoke as well as spending seven years at Bristol Rovers.

== Career ==
Cartlidge was born in Stoke-upon-Trent and played amateur football with Penkell Victoria and Market Drayton Town before joining Stoke in 1899. He played ten matches for Stoke in two seasons before joining Bristol Rovers.

On 3 May 1901 he joined Bristol Rovers from Stoke, where he remained for seven years, making 258 appearances in the Southern League and winning the league title during the 1904–05 season. He left Bristol in April 1908 to join Aston Villa playing 55 times, before returning to Stoke in 1911 to play in the Southern League for two more years. He ended his career with South Shields.

== Career statistics ==
| Club | Season | League | | | FA Cup | | Charity Shield | | Total | |
| Club | Season | Division | Apps | Goals | Apps | Goals | Apps | Goals | Apps | Goals |
|---|---|---|---|---|---|---|---|---|---|---|
| Stoke | 1899–1900 | First Division | 3 | 0 | 0 | 0 | – | | 3 | 0 |
| Stoke | 1900–01 | First Division | 7 | 0 | 0 | 0 | – | | 7 | 0 |
| Stoke | Total | | 10 | 0 | 0 | 0 | 0 | 0 | 10 | 0 |
| Aston Villa | 1908–09 | First Division | 3 | 0 | 0 | 0 | – | | 3 | 0 |
| Aston Villa | 1909–10 | First Division | 35 | 0 | 2 | 0 | – | | 37 | 0 |
| Aston Villa | 1910–11 | First Division | 14 | 0 | 0 | 0 | 1 | 0 | 15 | 0 |
| Aston Villa | Total | | 52 | 0 | 2 | 0 | 1 | 0 | 55 | 0 |
| Stoke | 1910–11 | Birmingham & District League / Southern League Division Two | 12 | 0 | 0 | 0 | – | | 12 | 0 |
| Stoke | 1911–12 | Southern League Division One | 22 | 0 | 1 | 0 | – | | 23 | 0 |
| Stoke | Total | | 34 | 0 | 1 | 0 | 0 | 0 | 35 | 0 |
| Career Total | | | 96 | 0 | 3 | 0 | 1 | 0 | 100 | 0 |
