= Hodgkin =

Hodgkin is a surname. Notable people with the surname include:

- Alan Lloyd Hodgkin (1914–1998), British physiologist and biophysicist
- Dorothy Hodgkin (1910–1994), British chemist who received the Nobel Prize in Chemistry in 1964, wife of Thomas Lionel Hodgkin
- Douglas Hodgkin, American political scientist and author
- Eliot Hodgkin (1905–1987), British painter
- Howard Hodgkin (1932–2017), British painter
- John Hodgkin (barrister) (1800–1875), English barrister and Quaker preacher, brother of Thomas Hodgkin (1798–1866)
- Robert Howard Hodgkin (1877–1951), English historian, son of Thomas Hodgkin (1831–1913)
- Thomas Hodgkin (1798–1866), English pathologist, eponym of Hodgkin's disease
- Thomas Hodgkin (historian) (1831–1913), British historian, son of John Hodgkin
- Thomas Lionel Hodgkin (1910–1982), English historian, son of Robert Howard Hodgkin, husband of Dorothy Hodgkin

== See also ==
- Hodgkins (disambiguation)
- Hodgkin lymphoma, also known as Hodgkin's lymphoma and Hodgkin's disease
- Hodgkin family, the Quaker family
