= Tom Bailey (footballer) =

English footballer (1888–c.1914)

Personal information
- Full name: Thomas Henry Bailey
- Date of birth: 1888
- Place of birth: Burton upon Trent, England
- Position: Wing half

Senior career*
Years	Team	Apps	(Gls)
1906	Overseal Swifts		
1907	Burton United		
1907–1908	Lincoln City	1	(0)
1908–1910	Walsall		
1910–1912	Gresley Rovers		
1912–1915	Stoke	30	(1)
1915	Hanley Swifts		
- * Club domestic league appearances and goals

Thomas Henry Bailey (1888 – after 1914) was an English footballer who played for Lincoln City and Stoke.

== Career ==
Bailey was born in Burton upon Trent and played for Overseal Swifts and Burton United before joining Lincoln City in 1907. He played once for Lincoln before playing for Walsall and Stoke Priory and signed for Stoke in 1912. He played 36 times for Stoke in three seasons scoring once against Caerphilly.

== Career statistics ==
Club	Season	League			FA Cup		Total	
Club	Season	Division	Apps	Goals	Apps	Goals	Apps	Goals
Lincoln City	1907–08	Second Division	1	0	0	0	1	0
Stoke	1912–13	Southern League Division One	13	0	0	0	13	0
Stoke	1913–14	Southern League Division Two	15	1	2	0	17	1
Stoke	1914–15	Southern League Division Two	6	0	0	0	6	0
Career total			35	1	2	0	37	1
