= Archie Sproson =

English footballer

Personal information
- Full name: Archie Sproson
- Date of birth: 1890
- Place of birth: Stafford, England
- Date of death: 1980 (aged 90)
- Position: Forward

Senior career*
Years	Team	Apps	(Gls)
- Stafford Rangers
1912–1913	Stoke	1	(0)
1913–19??	Cannock		
- * Club domestic league appearances and goals

Archie Sproson (1890–1980) was an English footballer who played for Stoke.

== Career ==
Sproson was born in Stafford and played amateur football with Stafford Rangers before joining Stoke in 1912. He played one match during the 1912–13 season which came in a 1–0 defeat to Coventry City before returning to amateur football with Cannock.

== Career statistics ==
Club	Season	League		FA Cup		Total	
Club	Season	Apps	Goals	Apps	Goals	Apps	Goals
Stoke	1912–13	1	0	0	0	1	0
Career Total		1	0	0	0	1	0
