= Archie Dyke =

English footballer

Personal information
- Full name: Archibald Samuel Dyke
- Date of birth: September 1886
- Place of birth: Newcastle-under-Lyme, England
- Date of death: c.1955 (aged 68–69)
- Position: Right winger

Youth career
- Chesterton
- Newcastle Congregational
- Newcastle P.S.A.

Senior career*
Years	Team	Apps	(Gls)
1909–1912	Stoke	26	(2)
1913–1914	Port Vale	19	(1)
1914	Stoke	15	(1)
1914–1919	Aston Villa	9	(0)
1919	Port Vale	1	(0)
- Stafford Rangers
1920	Coventry City	3	(0)
1921–1922	Blackpool	1	(0)
- Congleton Town
Total		74+	(4+)
- * Club domestic league appearances and goals

Archibald Samuel Dyke (September 1886 – c.1955) was an English footballer. He played for Stoke, Port Vale, Aston Villa, Stafford Rangers, Coventry City, Blackpool, and Congleton Town.

== Career ==
Dyke played for Chesterton, Newcastle Congregational, and Newcastle P.S.A. before joining Birmingham & District League side Stoke in 1909. He played one game in the 1909–10 and 1910–11 campaigns, before making 24 appearances in 1911–12, scoring league goals against Plymouth Argyle and Bristol Rovers. He then played 15 league and three FA Cup games in 1913–14, scoring once against Treharris Athletic.

He switched clubs to nearby rivals Port Vale in the summer of 1912. He made his debut in a 5–0 defeat at Stalybridge Celtic in a Central League match on 3 September 1912 and impressed enough to hold on to a first-team spot. He lost his place in March 1913 and returned to Stoke that summer, having played 19 league games for the "Valiants".

Dyke moved on to Aston Villa in January 1913. He made his final appearance on 13 February 1915, in a 0-0 home draw against Bradford City, before his football career was interrupted by the war. Whilst with Villa, he guested for Vale during World War I in 1916. He rejoined the club permanently in August 1919, but after being elected back into the Football League in October 1919 the club could not negotiate his transfer. He moved on to Stafford Rangers, Coventry City, Blackpool and Congleton Town.

== Personal life ==
Dyke enlisted in the Royal Army Veterinary Corps in September 1915 during the First World War. He was transferred to the Royal Horse Artillery as a gunner and served in Palestine. He was medically discharged in August 1919 after suffering dysentery.

== Career statistics ==
Appearances and goals by club, season and competition
Club	Season	League			FA Cup		Total	
Club	Season	Division	Apps	Goals	Apps	Goals	Apps	Goals
Stoke	1909–10	Birmingham & District League / Southern League Division Two	1	0	0	0	1	0
Stoke	1910–11	Birmingham & District League / Southern League Division Two	1	0	0	0	1	0
Stoke	1911–12	Southern League Division One	24	2	0	0	24	2
Port Vale	1913–14	Central League	19	1	1	0	20	1
Stoke	1913–14	Southern League Division Two	15	1	3	0	18	1
Aston Villa	1913–14	First Division	6	0	0	0	6	0
Aston Villa	1914–15	First Division	3	0	0	0	3	0
Aston Villa	Total		9	0	0	0	9	0
Port Vale	1919–20	Central League	1	0	0	0	1	0
Coventry City	1920–21	Second Division	3	0	0	0	3	0
Blackpool	1921–22	Second Division	1	0	0	0	1	0
Career total			74	4	4	0	78	4
