= Ernest Hodkin =

English footballer

Personal information
- Full name: Ernest Hodkin
- Date of birth: 1890
- Place of birth: Alfreton, England
- Date of death: 1967 (aged 77)
- Place of death: Durham, England
- Position: Right half

Senior career*
Years	Team	Apps	(Gls)
1908	Clay Cross Works		
1909	Mansfield Mechanics		
1910–1911	Sunderland	2	(0)
1911–1913	Stoke	27	(1)
1913	Billingham		
1914	Shirebrook		
1919	Mansfield Mechanics		
- * Club domestic league appearances and goals

Ernest Hodkin (1890 – 1967) was an English footballer who played for Sunderland and Stoke.

== Career ==
Hodkin was born in Alfreton and played for his works sides Clay Cross Works and Mansfield Mechanics before joining League side Sunderland in 1910. He played twice for the "Black Cats" in 1910–11 and at the end of the season left for Southern League side Stoke. He played five times in 1911–12 scoring once against Northampton Town and played 24 times in the 1912–13 relegation season. He then went on to play for Billingham, Shirebrook and Mansfield Mechanics.

== Career statistics ==
Appearances and goals by club, season and competition
Club	Season	League			FA Cup		Total	
Club	Season	Division	Apps	Goals	Apps	Goals	Apps	Goals
Sunderland	1910–11	First Division	2	0	0	0	2	0
Stoke	1911–12	Southern League Division One	5	1	0	0	5	1
Stoke	1912–13	Southern League Division One	22	0	2	0	24	0
Career total			29	1	2	0	31	1
