= John McGillivray (footballer) =

English footballer

Personal information
- Full name: John McGillivray
- Date of birth: 7 March 1886
- Place of birth: Broughton, Lancashire, England
- Date of death: 1977 (aged 90–91)
- Position: Half back

Senior career*
Years	Team	Apps	(Gls)
1907–1910	Manchester United	3	(0)
1910–1911	Southport Central		
1911–1912	Stoke	24	(0)
1912–1914	Dartford	78	(11)
1921-1926	Dartford	166	(13)
- * Club domestic league appearances and goals

John McGillivray (7 March 1886 – 1977) was an English footballer who played in the played in the Football League for Manchester United. He also played for Southport Central, Stoke and Dartford.

== Career ==
McGillivray was born in Broughton, Lancashire and began his career with Manchester United. He spent two seasons at Old Trafford playing in four matches in 1907–08 and 1908–09 before he was released. He joined Southport Central and then played 25 times for Southern League side Stoke in 1911–12. He later played for Dartford.

== Career statistics ==
Appearances and goals by club, season and competition
Club	Season	League			FA Cup		Total	
Club	Season	Division	Apps	Goals	Apps	Goals	Apps	Goals
Manchester United	1907–08	First Division	1	0	1	0	2	0
Manchester United	1908–09	First Division	2	0	0	0	2	0
Stoke	1911–12	Southern League Division One	24	0	1	0	25	0
Career total			27	0	2	0	29	0
