= Dick Smith (footballer, born 1889) =

English footballer

Personal information
- Full name: Richard Smith
- Date of birth: 1889
- Place of birth: Stoke-upon-Trent, England
- Date of death: 1939 (aged 50)
- Place of death: Stoke-on-Trent, England
- Position: Forward

Senior career*
Years	Team	Apps	(Gls)
–	Newcastle Town		
1913–1915	Stoke	32	(20)
- * Club domestic league appearances and goals

Richard Smith (1889 – 1939) was an English footballer who played for Stoke.

== Career ==
Smith was born in Stoke-upon-Trent and played amateur football with Newcastle Town before joining Stoke in 1913. In his first season with the club Smith hit ten goals in the Southern League and managed the same amount the following season helping the club win the league and with it re-gaining their place in the Football League. He left the club at the end of the season and joined the army.

== Career statistics ==
Club	Season	League		FA Cup		Total	
Club	Season	Apps	Goals	Apps	Goals	Apps	Goals
Stoke	1913–14	15	10	1	1	16	11
Stoke	1914–15	17	10	0	0	17	10
Career Total		32	20	1	1	33	21

== Honours ==
Stoke

- Southern Football League Division Two champion: 1914–15
