= Alf Smith (footballer, born 1880) =

English footballer

Personal information
- Full name: Alfred Smith
- Date of birth: 1880
- Place of birth: Longton, England
- Date of death: 1957 (aged 77)
- Position: Inside left

Senior career*
Years	Team	Apps	(Gls)
1901–1902	Dresden Queen's Park		
1902–1903	Burton United	1	(0)
1903–1906	Stoke	3	(0)
1906–1909	Wrexham		
1909–1910	Crewe Alexandra		
1910–1915	Stoke	138	(67)
Total		142	(67)
- * Club domestic league appearances and goals

Alfred Smith (1880 – 1957) was an English footballer who played in the Football League for Stoke.

== Career ==
Smith Initially signed for Stoke from Burton United in 1904, he made his League debut against Nottingham Forest in March 1904 but however he failed to impress the management team and left for Wrexham. Four years later, after serving with Crewe Alexandra he returned to the Victoria Ground, a much wiser and experienced footballer. In the 1910–11 season Smith scored an impressive 35 goals in 44 games for Stoke. Whilst he struggled to reach them highs in the following two seasons and scored 16 goals in 1913–14 and left Stoke after the 1914–15 season. He scored 72 goals for Stoke in all competitions making him one of Stoke most prolific goal scorers. He later took up cricket and became vice captain of Longton Cricket Club.

== Career statistics ==
Appearances and goals by club, season and competition
Club	Season	League			FA Cup		Total	
Club	Season	Division	Apps	Goals	Apps	Goals	Apps	Goals
Burton United	1903–04	Second Division	1	0	0	0	1	0
Stoke	1903–04	First Division	1	0	0	0	1	0
Stoke	1904–05	First Division	0	0	0	0	0	0
Stoke	1905–06	First Division	2	0	0	0	2	0
Stoke	1910–11	Birmingham & District League / Southern League Division Two	41	31	3	4	44	35
Stoke	1911–12	Southern League Division One	23	4	1	0	24	4
Stoke	1912–13	Southern League Division One	34	9	2	1	36	10
Stoke	1913–14	Southern League Division Two	22	16	3	0	25	16
Stoke	1914–15	Southern League Division Two	18	7	0	0	18	7
Career total			142	67	9	5	151	72
