= Alfred Barker (football manager) =

English football manager (1873–1940)

Personal information
- Date of birth: 1873
- Place of birth: Stoke-upon-Trent, England
- Date of death: 1940 (aged 66–67)

Managerial career
- Years: Team
- 1908–1914: Stoke

Alfred J. Barker (1873–1940) was an English association football manager who managed Stoke between 1908 and 1914.

== Career ==
Barker was born in Stoke-upon-Trent and became a referee for the Football League and was also a supporter of his local team Stoke. He retired from officiating in 1907 and when Stoke suffered financial meltdown in 1907–08 which led to the club being liquidated and leaving the Football League, Barker and a number of wealthy supporters got together and bought the club back from the brink of extinction. They formed a new company re-branded Stoke Football Club (1908) Limited with Barker being appointed secretary-manager. Barker's impressive efforts led to Stoke being included for re-election but lost out to Tottenham Hotspur and their exit from the Football League was sealed.

Barker placed Stoke in the Birmingham & District League for the 1908–09 season. With Stoke wanting to gain a quick return to League football they joined the Southern Football League in 1909–10. Stoke scored 167 goals in 1910–11 as they gain promotion to the Southern League Division One and won the Birmingham & District League. However, despite much expectation being placed on the team they found that Division One was much tougher than they had expected and were relegated back to Division Two in 1912–13 and after Stoke failed to gain an instant return in 1913–14 Barker took most of the criticism from the supporters. Both Barker and chairman A. Hurst stepped down in the Summer of 1914 it was a sad way to see such key figures, responsible for saving the club, leave in such circumstances.

== Managerial statistics ==
Managerial record by club and tenure
Team	From	To	Record				
Team	From	To	P	W	D	L	Win %
Stoke	May 1908	April 1914	256	130	35	91	50.8
Total			256	130	35	91	50.8

== Honours ==
- Southern League Division Two champions: 1909–10
- Southern League Division Two runner-up: 1910–11
- Birmingham & District League: 1910–11
