= Lodge (surname) =

Lodge is a surname. Notable people with the surname include:

- Alexander Lodge (1881–1938), British engineer
- Alfred Lodge (1854–1937), British mathematician
- Carron Lodge (c. 1883 – 1910), British figure and landscape painter
- David Lodge (disambiguation), several people
- Sir Edmund Lodge (1756–1839), British Officer of Arms and author
- Eleanor Constance Lodge (1869–1936), historian and Principal of Westfield College, London
- Francis Graham Lodge (1908–2002), British black-and-white artist
- George Cabot Lodge (1873–1909), American poet
- George Edward Lodge (1860–1954), British birds artist
- Henry Cabot Lodge (1850–1924), U.S. Senator from Massachusetts
- Henry Cabot Lodge Jr. (1902–1985), U.S. Senator from Massachusetts, grandson of Henry Cabot Lodge
- Jimmy Lodge (1895–1971), English footballer
- John Lodge (disambiguation), several people
  - John Lodge (musician) (1943–2025), English musician, best known as the bassist and singer of The Moody Blues
  - John C. Lodge (1862–1950), mayor of Detroit, Michigan
- Judith Lodge (born 1941), Canadian painter and photographer
- Martin Lodge, German political scientist
- Martin Lodge (composer) (1954–2024), New Zealand composer and professor of music
- Sir Oliver Lodge (1851–1940), British physicist and writer who patented radio frequency tuning
- Oliver W. F. Lodge (1878–1955), poet and author
- Sir Richard Lodge (1855–1936), historian
- Samuel Lodge (1829–1897), clergyman and author
- Stephen Lodge (screenwriter) (1943–2017), American screenwriter and actor
- Stephen Lodge (referee) (born 1952), retired English football official
- Sir Thomas Lodge (c. 1509-1584), Lord Mayor of London and father of the writer
- Thomas Lodge (c. 1558–1625), dramatist and writer
- Tom Lodge (1936–2012), British author and radio broadcaster

Fictional characters:

- Hiram Lodge, character from Archie, father of Veronica Lodge
- Veronica Lodge, character from Archie, daughter of Hiram Lodge
