= List of British place-names containing reflexes of Celtic *kaitos "woodland" =

The Celtic word *kaitos is one of the Celtic words appearing most widely in British place-names, and those names are correspondingly important to understanding the phonological history of the Brittonic languages, and how Brittonic words have been borrowed into English and Gaelic. Despite its frequency in English place-names, the word seems never to have been borrowed into English as a common noun.

Although in 2000, Richard Coates and Andrew Breeze commented that "the representation of this element in English names needs further careful study", its evidence for both the history of /k/ and /t/ has since been assessed in some detail. Place-names containing *kaitos are a particularly important source of evidence for understanding the process of palatalisation and affrication of /k/ in Old English; the consequent palatal diphthongisation of /eː/ after /k/ in Old English; the phonological development of the Indo-European diphthong /ai/ in the Brittonic languages; and for dialectal variation in the development of /t/ in Brittonic.

Place-names containing *kaitos also provide evidence for the history of forests in medieval Britain.

== Phonological history ==
Celtic *kaitos shares a root with the Germanic word that survives in English as heath. Both descend from a root */kait-/, which developed as Common Celtic */kaito-/ > Common Brittonic and Gaulish */kɛːto-/ > Old Welsh coit > Middle and Modern Welsh coed; Old Cornish cuit > Middle Cornish co(y)s > Cornish cos; Old Breton cot, coet > Middle Breton koed > Breton koad.

Since Old English lacked a vowel /ɛː/, Brittonic */kɛːt(-)/ was sometimes borrowed into Old English with the higher Old English vowel /eː/ (as in Chetwode and Datchet) and sometimes with the lower vowel /æː/ (as in Cathcart and Bathgate), though /eː/ predominates. In both cases, the vowel sometimes underwent palatal diphthongisation in Old English. The diphthongisation of /eː/ was to the sound written as ⟨ie⟩, which subsequently developed to /yː/ and usually then /iː/ (as in Chitterne) but occasionally /uː/ (as in Chute Forest). The diphthongisation of /æː/ was to /æːɑ/ (found in the Old English form Penceat, whose modern form is Penge).

== List ==
Places are listed by historic (pre-1974) county. Where multiple modern names derive from the same ancient name, they are grouped under the same bullet point. Inevitably some uncertainty attaches to many examples; names included here have been listed as probable examples by key authorities.

=== Scotland ===
Unless otherwise stated, items on this list are from one by Simon Taylor.

- Upper Keithack, Lower Keithack, and Keithmore (Banffshire, near Dufftown)
- Keith (Banffshire)
- Keithny Burn, Inverkeithny (Banffshire)
- Kethock Burn (Aberdeenshire, near Fraserburgh)
- Keithney (Aberdeenshire, near Chapel of Garioch)
- Keithock, Keithock Burn (Angus, between Montrose and Brechin)
- Keithick (Perthshire, near Coupar Angus)
- Kethyn (Fife, near Easter Kinnear, Kilmany, now lost)
- aqua de Kethok (Fife, now the Den Burn, dividing Kilconquhar parish from the parish of Carnbee)
- Kethymyre (Fife, a bog between Burntisland and Kinghorn parishes)
- Keithing Burn, Inverkeithing (Fife)
- Dalkeith, Keith Hill (Kinross, Fossoway parish)
- Keith Lundie, Easter Keith, Wester Keith (Angus, near Lundie parish)
- Ferret of Keith (Renfrewshire)
- Dankeith (Ayrshire)
- Knockycoid (Ayrshire)
- Knockcoid (Wigtownshire)
- Inchkeith, Inchkeith Hill (Berwickshire, in Lauder parish)
- Dalkeith (Midlothian)
- Pencaitland (East Lothian)
- Bathgate (West Lothian)
- Keith Marischal (East Lothian)
- Cathcart (Renfrewshire)
- Kitattie (Fife, Leuchars parish, now lost)
- Catochil (Perthshire, Abernethy parish)

=== England ===
Unless otherwise stated, items on this list are drawn from the gazetteer of etymologically Celtic place-names in England published by Richard Coates and Andrew Breeze in 2000.

==== North East ====
- Carrycoats (Northumberland)

==== North West ====
- Brankelow Cottage (Cheshire)
- Chathull (Cheshire)
- Cheadle, Greater Manchester (Cheshire)
- Clesketts (Cumberland)
- Culgaith (Cumberland)
- Alkincoats (Lancashire)
- Cheetham, Cheetwood (Lancashire)
- Culcheth (Lancashire)
- Dinckley (Lancashire)
- Penketh (Lancashire)
- Tulketh (Lancashire)
- Worsley (Lancashire)
- Ketland (Westmorland)

==== Yorkshire and the Humber ====
- Kesteven (Lincolnshire)
- Chetwde (West Yorkshire)

==== East Midlands ====
- Ketton (Rutland)

==== West Midlands ====
- Coedmoor (Herefordshire, near Much Dewchurch)
- Hengoed (Herefordshire, near Selattyn and Gobowen)
- Llan-y-coed (Herefordshire, near Clifford)
- Maes-coed (Herefordshire, near Clodock)
- Pendigott (Herefordshire, near Llanwarne)
- Letocetum, Lichfield (Staffordshire)
- Penkhull (Staffordshire)
- Avon Dasset, Burton Dasset, Dosthill (Warwickshire)

==== East of England ====
- Chatteris (Cambridgeshire)
- Chettisham (Cambridgeshire)
- Trunch (Norfolk)

==== South East ====
- Datchet (Buckinghamshire)
- Pingewood (Berkshire)
- Chetwode (Buckinghamshire)
- Panshill Farm (Buckinghamshire)
- Chidden (Hampshire)
- Melchet Forest, Melchet, Melchet Park (Hampshire; Melchet Forest also in Wiltshire)
- Chatham (Kent)
- Chattenden (Kent)
- Penge (Surrey)

==== South West ====
- Bodgate (Devon)
- Dunchideock (Devon)
- Morchard Bishop (Devon)
- Olchard (Devon)
- Cruwys Morchard (Devon)
- Penquit (Devon)
- Chettisholt (Devon)
- Chetterwood (Dorset)
- Chideock (Dorset)
- Lytchett Matravers, Lytchett Minster, Lytchett Heath (Dorset)
- East Orchard, West Orchard (Dorset)
- Chaceley (Gloucestershire)
- Mailscot (Gloucestershire)
- Coed Ithel (Gloucestershire)
- Cedern (Somerset)
- Tolchet (Somerset)
- Watchet (Somerset)
- Cheadle (Staffordshire)
- Chicklade (Wiltshire)
- Chitterne (Wiltshire)
- Chittoe (Wiltshire)
- Chute Forest, Upper Chute, Lower Chute, Chute Causeway (Wiltshire)
- Penchet (Wiltshire)
- Preshute (Wiltshire).

==== Cornwall ====
Joanne Pye's 2018 PhD thesis on Cornish place-names reports that she knew of 129 instances of Cornish place-names containing coys. She found that

We can see clearly [...] how the distinct geographical areas of Cornwall are differentiated in place-names between eastern, middle and western forms of *coys, to the point where it could almost be used as an isogloss or proxy to indicate where the later Cornish language was spoken. In eastern and parts of mid Cornwall forms with final /t/ or /d/ predominate, including in combination with other elements, whilst in the middle and western Cornwall final /s/ forms can be seen. Where final /t/ forms occur in Penwith in far western Cornwall they are likely to be fossilised and indicate long use. Local dialectal variations in vowel sounds can also be seen, which range from /oi/ diphthongs in much of Cornwall to /oo/ sounds in some mid and western areas, with the form *goose (showing initial mutation of c > g) appearing as a suffix in mid and western Cornwall.

=== Wales ===
Place-names including modern Welsh coed are very common in Wales. Over one thousand place-names are known that include the compound noun coedcae~coetgae ("enclosed field, hedge") alone. Examples are Bangor-is-y-Coed, Betws-y-Coed, Blaen-y-coed, Caeau Pen-y-coed, Cefn-coed-y-cymmer, Coedarhydyglyn, Coed Coch, Coed Darcy, Coedpoeth, Coed-y-Brenin, Coed-y-bryn, Coed y Garth, Ceredigion, Lôn Goed, Melin-y-Coed, Mynydd Drws-y-Coed, Pen-coed, Tal-y-coed Court, and Ysgubor-y-coed.
