= Samuel Lodge =

The Rev. Samuel Lodge (11 February 1829 – 5 September 1897) was the author of Scrivelsby, the Home of the Champions He was a headmaster of Horncastle Grammar School, Lincolnshire, rector for 30 years of Scrivelsby in Lincolnshire, and a Canon of Lincoln Cathedral.

== Life and works ==
Samuel Lodge was born at Barking, Essex, a son of the Rev. Oliver Lodge (1764–1845) (latterly rector of Elsworth, Cambridgeshire), and was educated at Huntingdon Grammar School and Lincoln College, Oxford.

Ordained in 1852, Samuel Lodge was Classical master of Louth Grammar School from 1851 to 1854, and subsequently curate of High Toynton, Lincolnshire, and Headmaster of Horncastle Grammar School. He became rector of Scrivelsby-cum-Dalderby, near Horncastle, in 1867 and was Rural Dean of Horncastle from 1868, in addition becoming Canon Prebendary of Stoke in Lincoln Cathedral from 1879 to 1896.

Lodge published his book, Scrivelsby, the Home of the Champions, in 1893. The Manor of Scrivelsby is a manor held by grand serjeanty, a form of tenure that requires the performance of a service rather than a money payment – in this case as the Queen's (or King's) Champions; members of the Dymoke family have held this office since the fourteenth century.

== Family ==
Lodge married Mary Brettingham (1824–1916) of Diss, Norfolk in 1852. They had eleven children, including George Edward Lodge (1860–1954), the ornithological artist. Their daughter Nora Margaret married Ernest Myers (1844–1921), the poet, Classicist & author.

Samuel Lodge died at Scrivelsby on 5 September 1897 aged 68 and was buried at St Benedict's churchyard, Horncastle.

=== Notable relatives ===
- Sir Oliver Joseph Lodge, physicist (a nephew)
- Sir Richard Lodge, historian (a nephew)
- Eleanor Constance Lodge, historian (a niece)
- Carron O Lodge, artist
- Francis Graham Lodge, artist

== Publications ==
- Lodge, The Rev. Samuel (1893). Scrivelsby, The Home of the Champions. Horncastle: W K Morton.
