= George Edward Lodge =

British ornithologist (1860–1954)

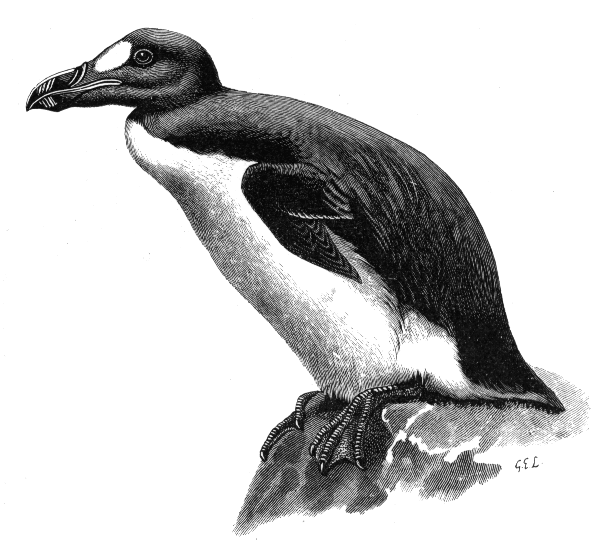
- Lodge's great auk, from Evans' Birds
- Born: 3 December 1860; Scrivelsby, Lincolnshire, England
- Died: 5 February 1954 (aged 93); Frimley, Surrey, England
- Resting place: St Benedict’s, Horncastle, Lincolnshire
- Known for: Painting; wildlife conservation.
- Notable work: Illustrations for The Birds of the British Isles

George Edward Lodge FZS, (3 December 1860 – 5 February 1954) was a British illustrator of birds and an authority on falconry.

== Early life ==
George Edward Lodge was born at Scrivelsby, Lincolnshire. His father, Samuel Lodge (1829–1897), was a Canon of Lincoln Cathedral and rector of Scrivelsby, Lincolnshire. G. E. Lodge was the seventh child of eleven, and the fifth son. His brother is the photographer Reginald Badham Lodge (1852–1937).

He was educated at home, and became an accomplished taxidermist. He travelled abroad in search of birds and sport, visiting Norway, Sweden, the West Indies and the United States. He was, however, most at home in the Scottish Highlands.

He attended Lincoln School of Art and studied and worked in London before moving around 1920 to Camberley, Surrey.

== Works ==
One of the earliest works for which he made illustrations was Lord Lilford’s Birds of Northamptonshire, in conjunction with Archibald Thorburn, whose skill as a bird-artist Lodge greatly admired. This admiration was returned as in the early 1910s Thorburn was approached by a representative of the New Zealand Government regarding a commission to provide plates for a proposed book of New Zealand native birds. Thorburn recommended Lodge for the commission and in 1913 Lodge began work. He studied bird skin specimens from a number of different collections in Britain including the Natural History Museum and eventually supplied 90 plates to the Wildlife Service of the Department of Internal Affairs of New Zealand. Due to the illness of the author the proposed book was never finished and the plates remained with the Department of Internal Affairs until they were transferred to the Dominion Museum in 1948. In 1983 the remaining 89 plates were eventually published in the book George Edward Lodge: The Unpublished New Zealand Bird Paintings with text by C.A. Fleming.

Lodge was also an expert at woodcuts, in which craft he contributed to books by Henry Seebohm and Badminton Library. His illustrations appeared in Beebe’s Monograph of the Pheasants and Eliot Howard’s Introduction to Bird Behaviour (1929).

He published his only book, Memoirs of an Artist Naturalist in 1946, illustrating it with his own pictures. One of his last acts, shortly before his eyesight became impaired, was to institute a trust fund for the publication of original works in natural history: the first publication was The Birds of the British Isles by Dr David Bannerman, for which Lodge painted 377 illustrations depicting 435 species.

== Conservation ==
Lodge took an active part in the conservation of wild life. He served for many years on the executive council of the Society for the Promotion of Nature Reserves, and was also an active member of the International Committee for Bird Protection. In 1945 he was elected vice-president of the British Ornithologists' Union, the first artist to be so honoured.

== Death and burial ==
Lodge died in hospital on 5 February 1954 at Frimley, Surrey and his ashes were interred in the same churchyard as his parents' grave at St Benedict's, Horncastle, Lincolnshire.

== Recognition ==
The author of his obituary in The Times wrote:

A man of most exceptional charm and distinction, [Lodge] was recognized on both sides of the Atlantic as one of the finest bird-artists this country has ever produced. His wide experience in falconry doubtless gave him special knowledge of the hawk family, for he was a keen falconer from his earliest days. In the painting of birds of prey he had no rival in any country. He was primarily an artist but, being a good naturalist as well, he was able to depict his subjects among their natural surroundings and to make them look alive.

An exhibition of Lodge's work, to mark the 150th anniversary of his birth, was held at Nature in Art, Gloucester, from 30 March–9 May 2010.

== Bibliography ==
His illustrations were used in books including:

- Baker, E C S (1900) The Indian Doves and Their Allies
- Baker, E C S (1908) Indian Ducks and Their Allies
- Baker, E C S (1921–1930) The Game-Birds of India, Burma and Ceylon
- Bannerman, D A (1930–1951) Birds of Tropical West Africa
- Bannerman, D A and Bannerman, W M (1958) Birds of Cyprus
- Bannerman, D A and Bannerman, W M (1963–1968) Birds of the Atlantic Islands
- Bannerman, D A and Bannerman, W M (1971) Handbook of the Birds of Cyprus and Migrants of the Middle East
- Baxter, E V & Rintoul, L J (1953) The Birds of Scotland
- Beebe, W (1926) Pheasants, their lives and homes
- Chapin, J P (1932–1954) The Birds of the Belgian Congo
- Coombes, R A H (1952) Mountain Birds
- Evans, A H (1899) Birds
- Fleming, C A (1983) George Edward Lodge - The Unpublished New Zealand Bird Paintings
- Hollom, P A D (1960) The Popular Handbook of Rarer British Birds
- Howard, Henry Eliot (1929) Introduction to Bird Behaviour
- Howard, Henry Eliot (1940) A waterhen's world
- Howard, Henry Eliot (1948) Territory in bird life
- Hudson, W H (1895) British Birds
- Jackson, F J – (1938) The Birds of Kenya Colony and the Uganda Protectorate
- Kelsall & Munn (1905) The Birds of Hampshire and The Isle of Wight
- Lilford (Lord) (1895) Notes on the Birds of Northamptonshire and Neighbourhood
- Lodge, G E (1946) Memoirs of an Artist Naturalist
- Mavrogordato, Jack (1960) A Hawk for the Bush. A treatise on the training of the Sparrow-hawk and other Short-winged Hawks
- Meinertzhagen, R (1930) Nicoll's Birds of Egypt
- Meinertzhagen, R (1954) Birds of Arabia
- Meinertzhagen, R (1959) Pirates and Predators
- Ogilvie-Grant, WE et al. (1912) The Gun at Home and Abroad
- Rothschild, L. W. (1907) Extinct Birds
- Savory J (ed) (1986) George Lodge, Artist Naturalist
- Smith, R B (1905) Bird Life and Bird Lore
- Vincent, J (1980) A Season of Birds

=== Biography ===
- George Lodge - Artist Naturalist John Savory (Ed.), Croom Helm, 1986 ISBN 0-7099-3366-5
- Obituary, J. K. Stanford, in The Field, 25 February 1954
- Obituary in The Times Tuesday 9 February 1954 (page 9 column 1)

== Notable relatives ==
- Sir Oliver Joseph Lodge Physicist
- Sir Richard Lodge Historian
- Eleanor Constance Lodge Historian
- Carron O Lodge Artist
- Francis Graham Lodge Artist
