= Penkhull =

District of Stoke-on-Trent, Staffordshire, England

Coordinates: 53.0007°N 2.1968°W

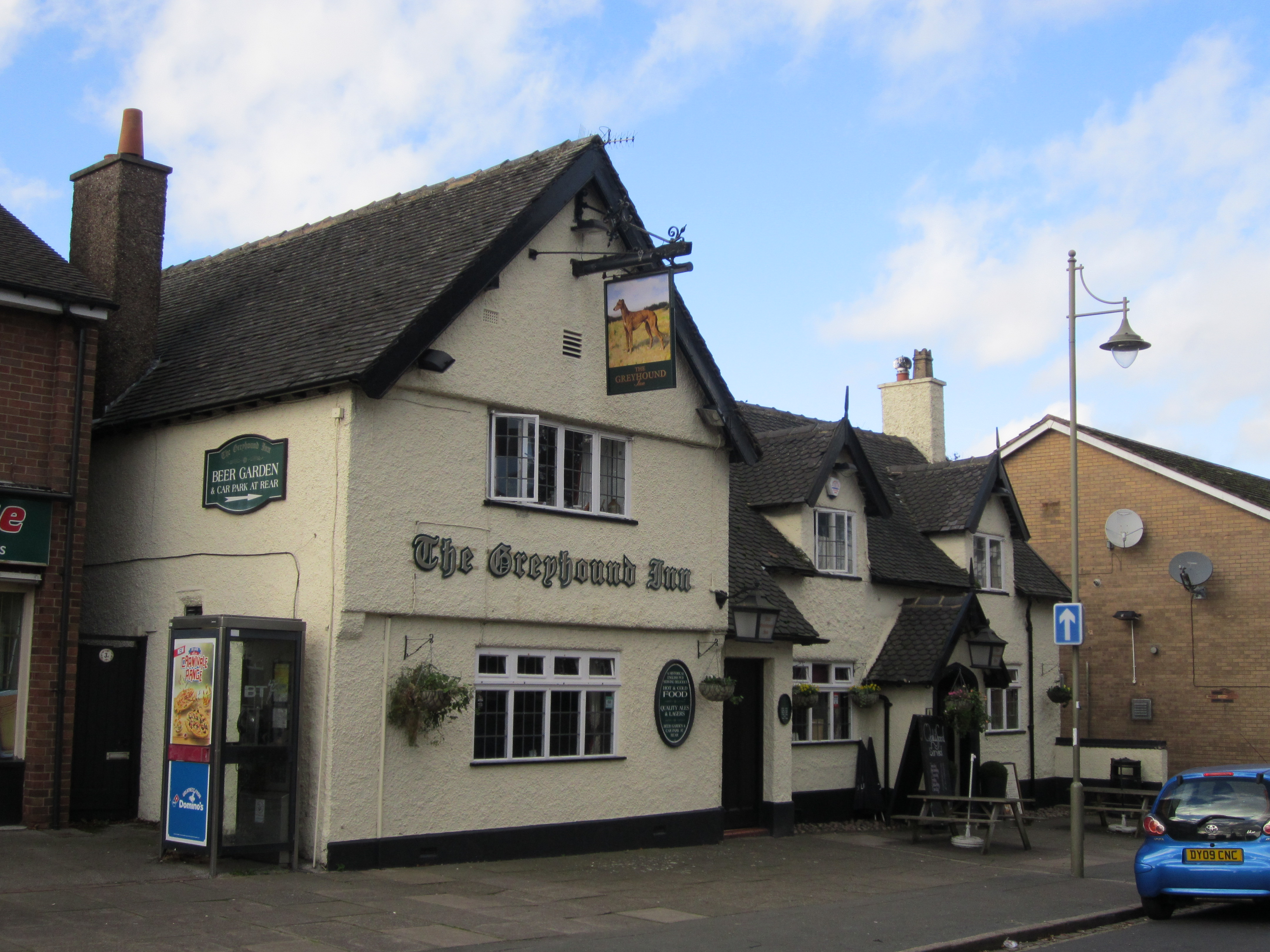
- The Greyhound Inn

- Flag

- Location within Staffordshire
- Population: 6,518 (2011.Ward. Penkhull and Stoke)
- OS grid reference: SJ868448
- Unitary authority: Stoke-on-Trent
- Ceremonial county: Staffordshire
- Region: West Midlands
- Country: England
- Sovereign state: United Kingdom
- Post town: STOKE-ON-TRENT
- Postcode district: ST4
- Dialling code: 01782
- Police: Staffordshire
- Fire: Staffordshire
- Ambulance: West Midlands
- UK Parliament: Stoke-on-Trent Central

Penkhull is a district of the city of Stoke-on-Trent, Staffordshire, England, part of Penkhull and Stoke electoral ward, and Stoke Central parliamentary constituency.

Penkhull is a conservation area, and includes Grade II listed buildings such as the church and Greyhound Inn public house.

== Etymology ==
The name Penkhull is first attested in the Domesday Book of 1086 in the form Pinchetel. Moving beyond nineteenth-century speculations, twentieth-century place-name researchers have identified the origin of the name Penkhull as two Common Brittonic words: *penno- (head) and *kēto- (woodland), corresponding to modern Welsh pen coed. Thus the name once meant "end of the wood". This Brittonic place-name was adopted by speakers of Old English, who added the Old English word hyll ("hill") to the end. The idea of a 'head' or 'end' is topographically apt, since the village is sited on the elevated end of a long strip of valley-side woodland which begins at the ancient Bradwell Wood five miles to the north.

== History ==
The early origins date from 2500 BC, and there have been three archaeological finds from this period. A study by the local city Council stated of Penkhull that... "it has held a settlement for over four thousand years".

The Domesday Book records it as two hides of land in the Hundred of Pirehill and that it was held by Earl Algar.

Penkhull was a Royal Manor from the time of William the Conqueror 1086, and the last record of its title as a Royal Manor was in 1308 under King (Edward II).

Penkhull was developed by Josiah Spode II as a dormitory suburb of Stoke-upon-Trent, the town from which the city of Stoke-on-Trent took its name.

== The Church ==
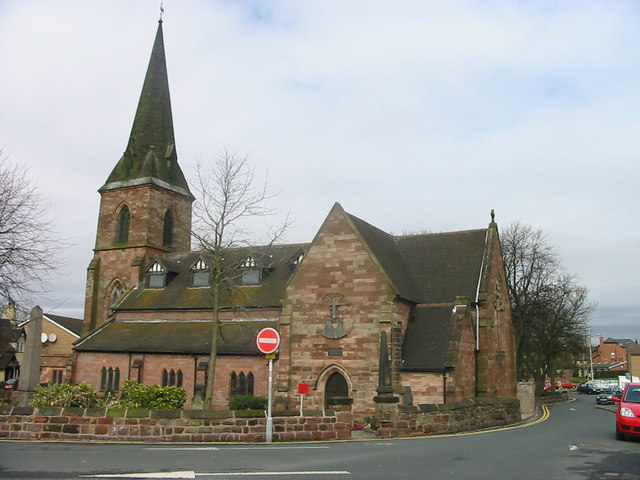
Church of St Thomas, Penkhull

The ecclesiastical parish was created out of the parish of Stoke in 1844 when the church of St. Thomas was built. The church is by Scott and Moffatt. The Revd Thomas Webb Minton, the son of Thomas Minton and Rector of Darlington, gave the sum of £2,000 to be invested from which the interest provided an income for the Vicar. The aisles were added in 1892 by Edward Prioleau Warren. The Village Hall was built at the same time and was at that time a Church of England school for the poor.

== Music and Performing Arts ==
Penkhull has a number of music and performing arts events, including annual Mystery Plays and community pantomime. There is also a Domesday Morris every January to celebrate good health and a successful fruit crop for the year ahead.

== Notable people ==
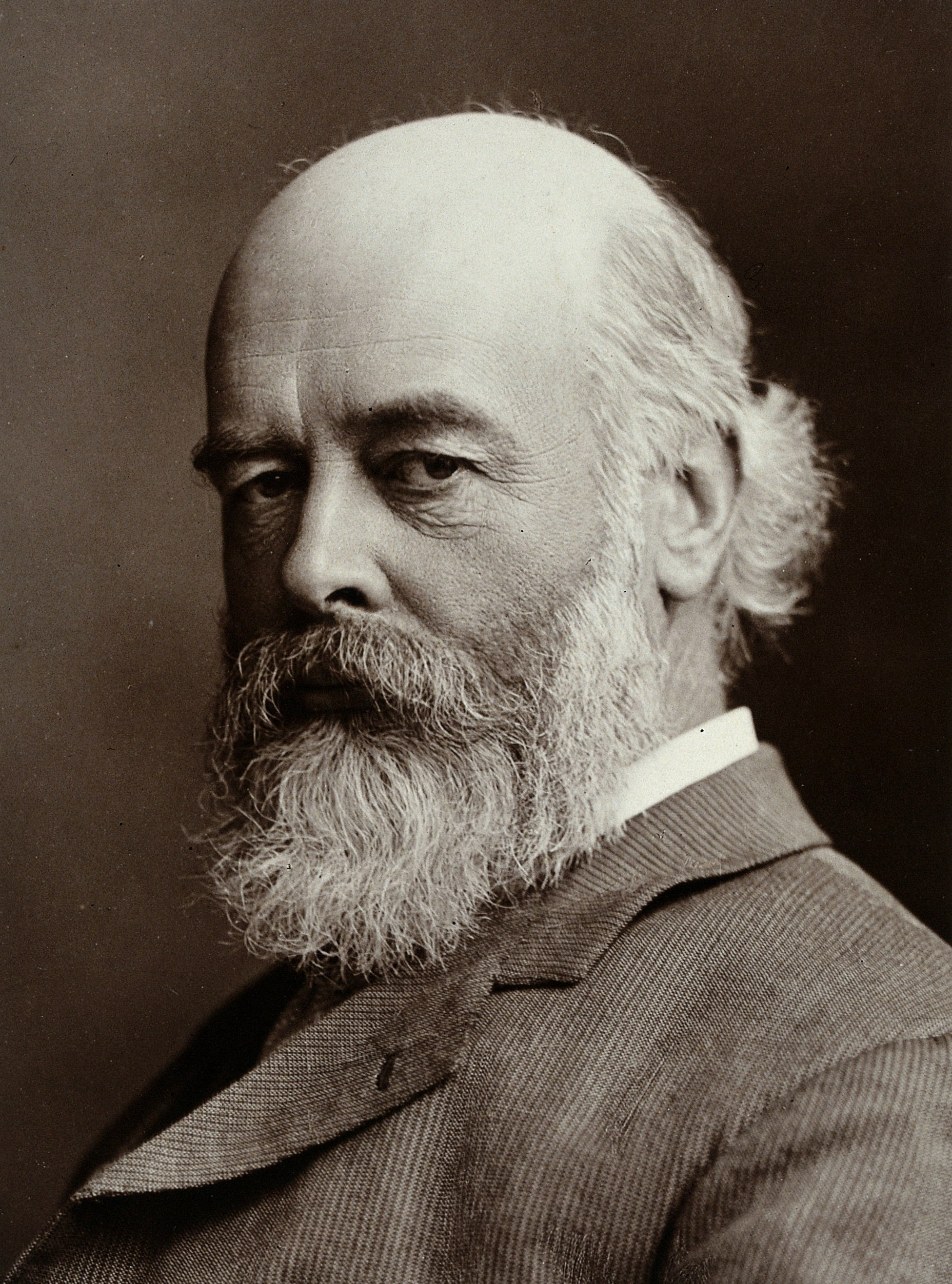
Oliver Joseph Lodge

- Thomas Whieldon (1719 in Penkhull - 1795) significant English potter who played a leading role in the development of the Staffordshire Potteries
- Josiah Spode II (1755–1827) built the large residential hall 'The Mount', and many properties for the employees who worked at his factory in the town of Stoke.
- Sir Oliver Joseph Lodge FRS (1851 in Penkhull – 1940) British physicist and writer involved in the development of radio and sparking plugs. He identified electromagnetic radiation. He was a Christian Spiritualist
- Professor Alfred Lodge MA (1854 in Penkhull – 1937), English mathematician, author, and the first president of the Mathematical Association
- Sir Richard Lodge (1855 in Penkhull – 1936) British historian and was Professor of History at the University of Glasgow from 1894 to 1899 and then Professor of History at the University of Edinburgh from 1899 to 1925
- Edward Prioleau Warren (1856 – 1937) British architect and archaeologist. In 1892 he worked on the addition of aisles at St Thomas's Church, Penkhull
- Eleanor Constance Lodge CBE, (1869 - 1936). Vice-Principal of Lady Margaret Hall, Oxford from 1890 to 1921 and then Principal of Westfield College, Hampstead, in the University of London from 1921 to 1931
- John Wain (1925-1994) Poet, novelist, playwright, biographer, critic, academic. He spent his childhood at Bromley Hough, Penkhull.
- Charles Tomlinson, CBE (1927 in Penkhull– 2015) British poet, translator, academic and illustrator. He grew up in Basford
- Neil Morrissey (born 1962) English actor, voice actor, singer, comedian, and businessman. He spent much of his childhood in Penkhull Children's Home and attended Thistley Hough High School.

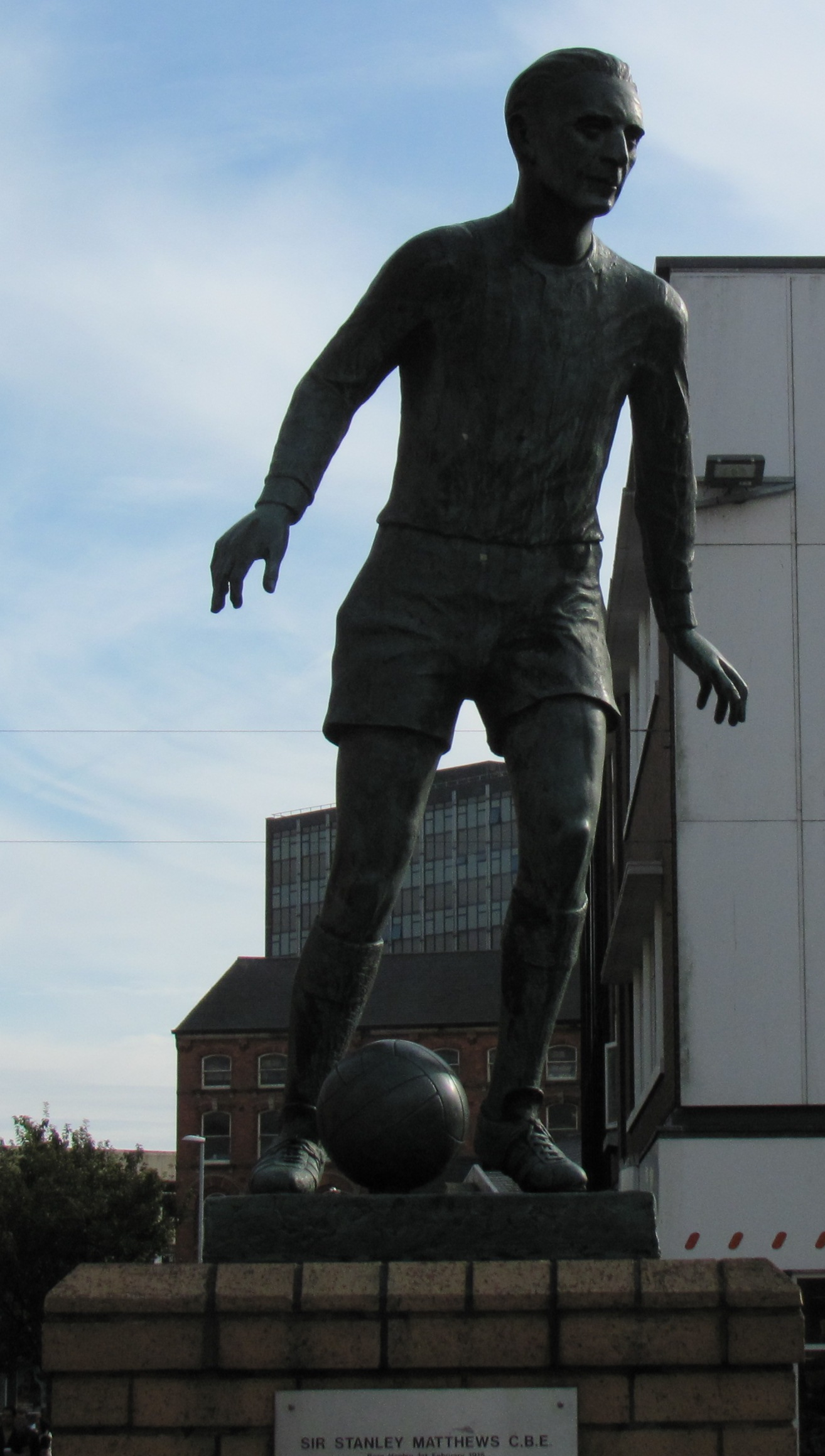
Stanley Matthews statue in Hanley town centre

=== Sport ===
- Reg Forester (1892 in Penkhull – 1959) English footballer who played for Stoke City F.C. and Macclesfield Town F.C.
- Sir Stanley Matthews (1915 – 2000) the only footballer to be knighted while still playing. He moved to "The Views" Penkhull (also birthplace of Sir Oliver Lodge) in 1989 where lived until his death in 2000.
- John Poole (born 1932) English former football goalkeeper who made 33 league appearances for Port Vale F.C. between 1953 and 1961.
- Bill Bratt MBE (born 1945) former chairman of Port Vale F. C., from 2003 to 2011. He lived in numerous children's homes in Penkhull, before becoming a miner at Chatterley Whitfield
- Peter Ridgway (born 1972 in Penkhull) cricketer, a left-handed batsman who bowled right-arm fast-medium
