= Lodge Cottrell =

Lodge Cottrell Ltd
- Industry: Air Pollution Control
- Founded: 1922
- Headquarters: Birmingham, England, UK
- Key people: Kevin Bridgewater, Managing Director Maurice Bottomley, Business Development Manager Maxim Yugai, Project Manager
- Products: Electrostatic Precipitation, Fabric Filters, Ceramic Filters, Flue Gas Desulphurisation, De-NOx Systems
- Website: www.lodgecottrell.co.uk

Lodge Cottrell Ltd. is a supplier of environmental air pollution control equipment for the power generation industry and other industrial process applications, with over 4,500 installations worldwide. It has facilities in Birmingham, England and Houston, Texas, United States, and operates through a network of associates, partners, agents and licensees. Lodge Cottrell Ltd and Lodge Cottrell Inc. are part of KC Cottrell Co., Ltd., an air pollution control company with its headquarters in Seoul, South Korea.

The company went into administration in May 2024.

== History ==
The Lodge Fume Deposit Company Limited was founded in Birmingham, England in 1913 by Sir Oliver Lodge who pioneered the electrostatic precipitation technique for removing dust. In 1922, the Lodge Fume Company changed its name to Lodge-Cottrell Ltd. in honor of Frederick Gardner Cottrell's additional contributions to the development electrostatic precipitation.
