= Janet Spens =

Scottish literary scholar (1876–1963)

her book

Janet Spens (1876–1963) was a Scottish literary scholar specialising in Elizabethan literature.

== Life ==
Laurel Bank School in Glasgow was formed in 1905 by Margaret Hannan Watson and Spens. They were both graduates of St Andrews and Glasgow University. Spens left Watson in charge when she left in 1908.

Spens was the assistant to Regius Professor Macneile Dixon in the Department of English Language and Literature (1908 to 1911) and "tutor to the women students in Arts" (1909 to 1911) at the University of Glasgow, before joining Lady Margaret Hall, Oxford as a fellow and tutor in English (1911 to 1936). In 1910, she became the first woman to be awarded a Doctor of Letters (DLitt) degree by the University of Glasgow.

== Private life ==
Lodge was very close to Eleanor Lodge who she met in 1911. They lodged at the same address and they hired a cottage from 1916 for nine years at Steeple Aston. They then bought a house together. Spens published "Eleanor Constance Lodge, Terms & Vacations" after Eleanor died in 1936.

== Selected works ==
- Spens, J. (1909). Two Periods of Disillusion. Glasgow: J. MacLehose.
- Spens, Janet (1916). An Essay on Shakespeare's Relation to Tradition. Oxford: B.H. Blackwell.
- Spens, Janet (1922). Elizabethan Drama. London: Methuen.
- Spens, Janet (1934). Spenser's Faerie Queene: an Interpretation. London: Edward Arnold & Co.
- Lodge, Eleanor Constance (1938). Janet Spens (ed.). Terms & Vacations. Oxford: Oxford University Press.
