= Oliver Lodge =

Physicist and electrical engineer (1851–1940)

Sir Oliver Lodge FRS
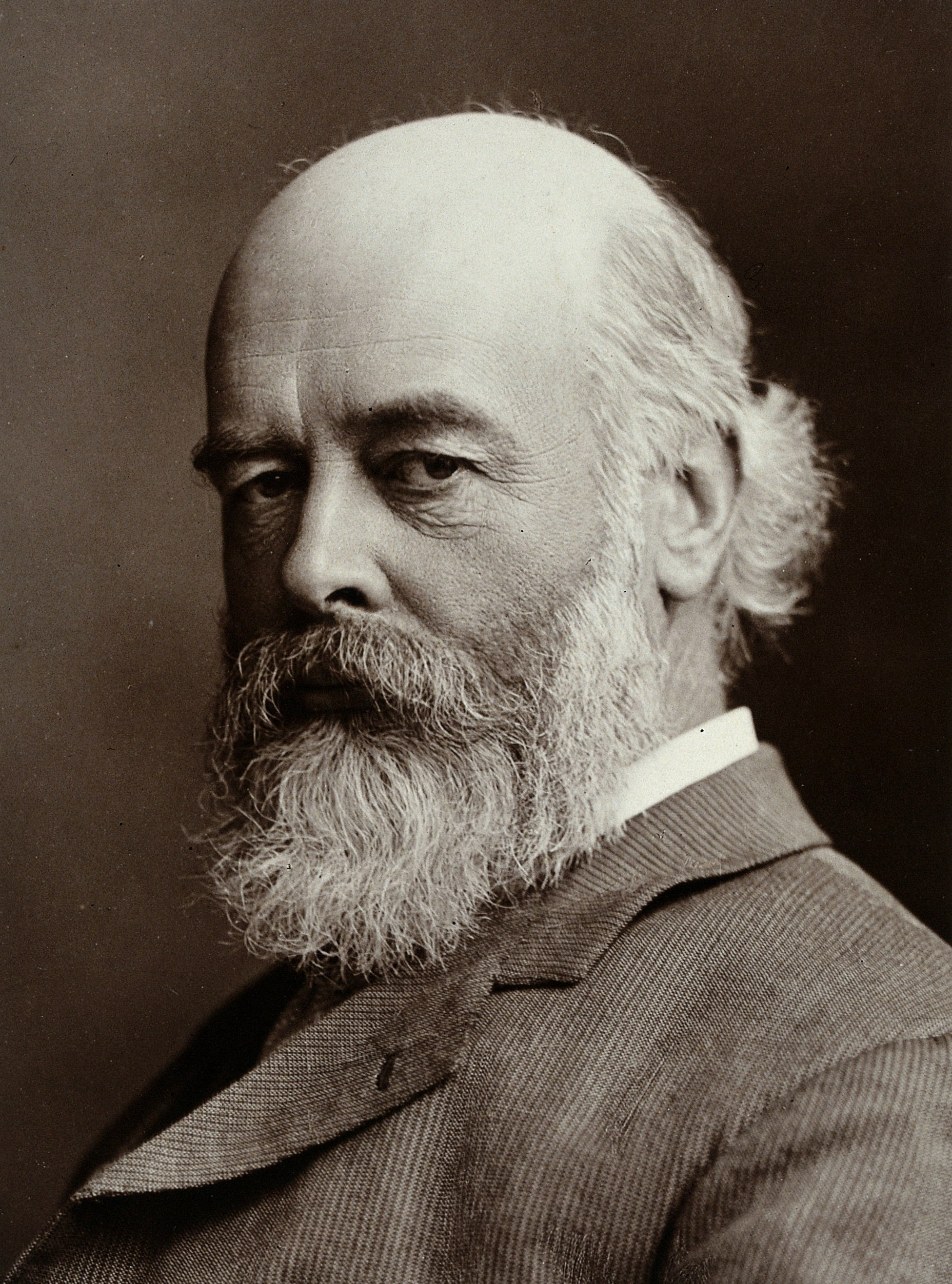

1st Principal of the University of Birmingham
- In office 1900–1919
- Preceded by: Office established
- Succeeded by: Sir Charles Grant Robertson

Personal details
- Born: Oliver Joseph Lodge; 12 June 1851 Penkhull, England
- Died: 22 August 1940 (aged 89) Wilsford cum Lake, England
- Spouse: Mary Fanny Alexander Marshall (m. 1877; died 1929)
- Children: 12, including Oliver and Alexander
- Relatives: See below
- Education: University of London (BSc, DSc)
- Known for: Radio; coherer; microwaves; moving-coil loudspeaker; moving boundary method; aether drag; waveguide; Maxwell–Lodge effect
- Awards: Rumford Medal (1898); Albert Medal (1919); Faraday Medal (1932)
- Scientific career
- Fields: Physics; Electrical engineering
- Workplaces: University of London; University College Liverpool
- Notable students: Charles Barkla

Sir Oliver Joseph Lodge (12 June 1851 – 22 August 1940) was an English physicist and electrical engineer whose investigations into electromagnetic radiation (EMR) contributed to the development of radio. He identified EMR independent of Heinrich Hertz's proof. In his 1894 Royal Institution lecture, The Work of Hertz and Some of His Successors, Lodge's demonstrations on methods to transmit and detect radio waves included an improved early radio receiver he named the coherer. His work led to his holding key patents in early radio communication, his "syntonic" (or tuning) patents.

Lodge was a pioneer of spiritualism; his pseudoscientific research into life after death was a topic on which he wrote many books, including the best-selling Raymond; or, Life and Death (1916), which detailed messages he received from a medium, which he believed came from his son who was killed in the First World War.

== Biography ==
Oliver Joseph Lodge was born on 12 June 1851 at The Views in Penkhull, Staffordshire, England, the eldest of seven boys of Grace (née Heath; 1826–1879) and Oliver Lodge (1826–1884), a successful potters' merchant. Between the ages of eight and twelve, Lodge attended Newport Grammar School (now Haberdashers' Adams) in Shropshire. Due to being unhappy there, he transferred to the Combs School in Suffolk, which he left at age fourteen to work at his father's business full-time.

In 1871, Lodge matriculated at the University of London, where he passed the examinations for his Bachelor of Science and Doctor of Science degrees in 1875 and 1877, respectively. He stayed at the university as Demonstrator in Physics and then Assistant Professor until 1881, when he was appointed Professor of Physics and Mathematics at the newly-founded University College Liverpool (now the University of Liverpool).

From 1900 to 1919, Lodge was the first Principal of the University of Birmingham.

== Research ==
=== Electromagnetism and radio ===
In 1873, James Clerk Maxwell published A Treatise on Electricity and Magnetism, and by 1876 Lodge was studying it intently. But Lodge was fairly limited in mathematical physics, both by aptitude and training—and his first two papers were a description of a mechanism (of beaded strings and pulleys) that could serve to illustrate electrical phenomena such as conduction and polarisation. Indeed, Lodge is probably best known for his advocacy and elaboration of Maxwell's aether theory, a later deprecated model postulating a wave-bearing medium filling all space. He explained his views on the aether in "Modern Views of Electricity" (1889) and continued to defend those ideas well into the twentieth century ("Ether and Reality", 1925).

As early as 1879, Lodge became interested in generating (and detecting) electromagnetic waves, something Maxwell had never considered. This interest continued throughout the 1880s, but some obstacles slowed Lodge's progress. First, he thought in terms of generating light waves with very high frequencies rather than radio waves with their much lower frequencies. Second, his good friend George Francis FitzGerald (on whom Lodge depended for theoretical guidance) assured him (incorrectly) that "ether waves could not be generated electromagnetically". FitzGerald later corrected his error, but by 1881 Lodge had assumed a teaching position at University College Liverpool—the demands of which limited his time and energy for research.

In 1887, the Royal Society of Arts asked Lodge to give a series of lectures on lightning, including why lightning rods and their conducting copper cable sometimes do not work, with lightning strikes following alternate paths, going through (and damaging) structures, instead of being conducted by the cables. Lodge took the opportunity to carry out a scientific investigation, simulating lightning by discharging Leyden jars into a long length of copper wire. Lodge found the charge would take a shorter high resistance route jumping a spark gap, instead of taking a longer low resistance route through a loop of copper wire. Lodge presented these first results, showing what he thought was the effect of inductance on the path lightning would take, in his May 1888 lecture.

In other experiments that spring and summer, Lodge put a series of spark gaps along two 29 meter (95') long wires and noticed he was getting a very large spark in the gap near the end of the wires, which seemed to be consistent with the oscillation wavelength produced by the Leyden jar meeting with the wave being reflected at the end of the wire. In a darkened room, he also noted a glow at intervals along the wire at one half wavelength intervals. He took this as evidence that he was generating and detecting Maxwell's electromagnetic waves. While traveling on a vacation to the Tyrolean Alps in July 1888, Lodge read in a copy of Annalen der Physik that Heinrich Hertz in Germany had been conducting his own electromagnetic research, and that he had published a series of papers proving the existence of electromagnetic waves and their propagation in free space. Lodge presented his own paper on electromagnetic waves along wires in September 1888 at the British Science Association meeting in Bath, adding a postscript acknowledging Hertz's work and saying: "The whole subject of electrical radiation seems working itself out splendidly."

In the 1890s, Lodge carefully studied the aether drag hypothesis. He built increasingly elaborate "whirling machines"; a whirling machine has a flat metal disk rotating at high speeds, in the hope of dragging ether near its surface. This would then be detected by shining light through it and observing the shift in the interference patterns. He could find no evidence of any ether drag.

On 1 June 1894, during a Friday Evening Discourse at the Royal Institution, Lodge gave a memorial lecture on the work of Hertz (recently deceased) and the German physicist's proof of the existence of electromagnetic waves six years earlier. Lodge set up a demonstration on the quasi optical nature of "Hertzian waves" (radio waves) and demonstrated their similarity to light and vision including reflection and transmission. Later in June he repeated his lecture, and on 14 August 1894 at the meeting for the British Association for the Advancement of Science at Oxford University he was able to increase the distance of transmission up to 55 meters (180'). Lodge used a detector called a coherer (invented by Edouard Branly), a glass tube containing metal filings between two electrodes. When the small electrical charge from waves from an antenna were applied to the electrodes, the metal particles would cling together or "cohere" causing the device to become conductive allowing the current from a battery to pass through it. In Lodge's setup the slight impulses from the coherer were picked up by a mirror galvanometer which would deflect a beam of light being projected on it, giving a visual signal that the impulse was received. After receiving a signal the metal filings in the coherer were broken apart or "decohered" by a manually operated vibrator or by the vibrations of a bell placed on the table near by that rang every time a transmission was received. Since this was one year before Guglielmo Marconi's 1895 demonstration of a system for radio wireless telegraphy and contained many of the basic elements that would be used in Marconi's later wireless systems, Lodge's lecture became the focus of priority disputes with the Marconi Company a little over a decade later over invention of wireless telegraphy (radio). At the time of the dispute some, including the physicist John Ambrose Fleming, pointed out that Lodge's lecture was a physics experiment, not a demonstration of telegraphic signaling. Lodge would later work with Alexander Muirhead on the development of devices specifically for wireless telegraphy.

In January 1898, Lodge presented a paper on "syntonic" tuning which he received a patent for that same year. Syntonic tuning allowed specific frequencies to be used by the transmitter and receiver in a wireless communication system. The Marconi Company had a similar tuning system adding to the priority dispute over the invention of radio. When Lodge's syntonic patent was extended in 1911 for another 7 years Marconi agreed to settle the patent dispute, purchasing the syntonic patent in 1912 and giving Lodge an (honorific) position as "scientific adviser".

=== Other works ===
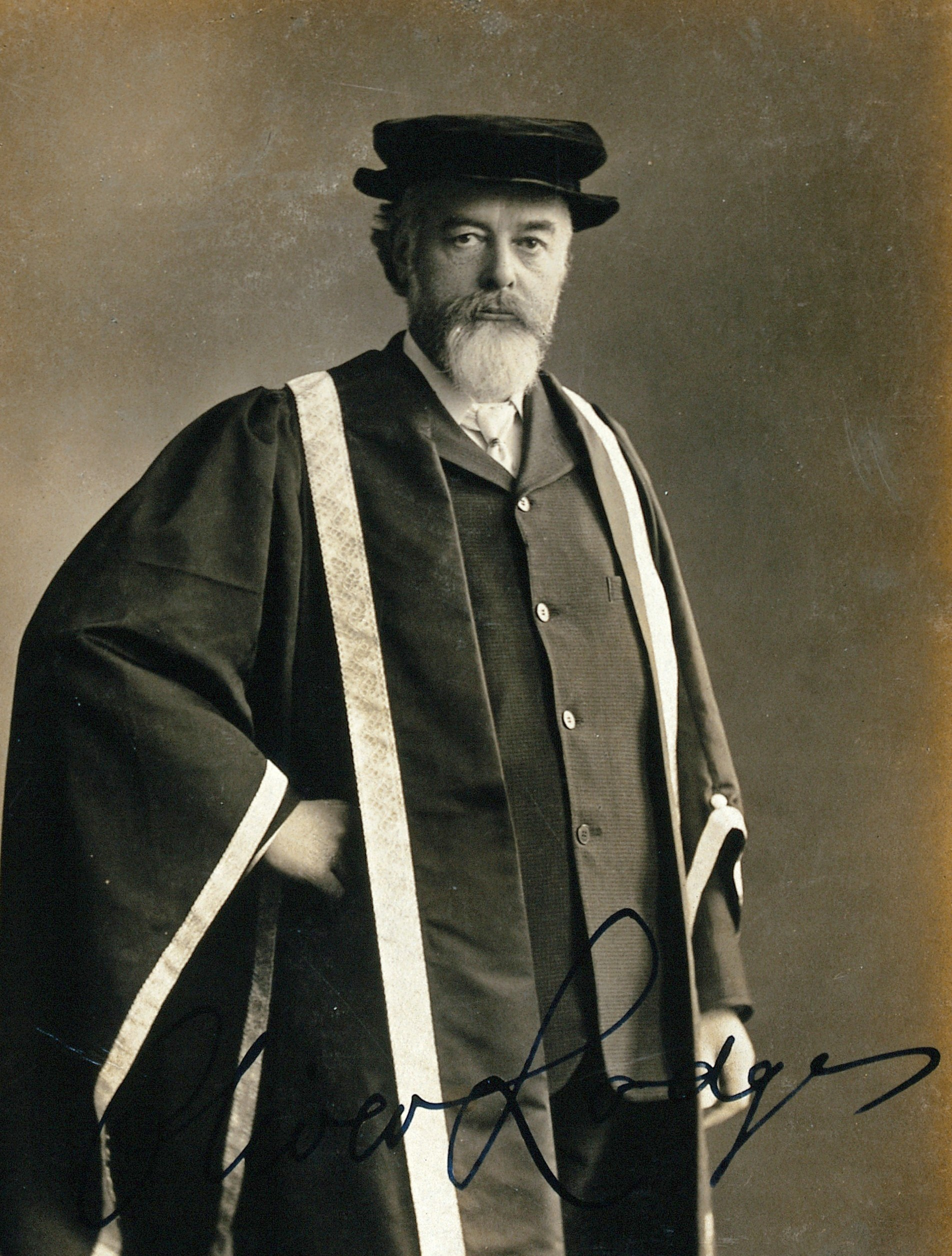
Lodge, c. 1910–1915

In 1886, Lodge developed the moving boundary method for the measurement in solution of an ion transport number, which is the fraction of electric current carried by a given ionic species.

Lodge carried out scientific investigations on the source of the electromotive force in the Voltaic cell, electrolysis, and the application of electricity to the dispersal of fog and smoke. He also made a major contribution to motoring when he patented a form of electric spark ignition for the internal combustion engine (the Lodge Igniter). Later, two of his sons developed his ideas and in 1903 founded Lodge Bros, which eventually became known as Lodge Plugs Ltd. He also made discoveries in the field of wireless transmission. In 1898, Lodge gained a patent on the moving-coil loudspeaker, utilizing a coil connected to a diaphragm, suspended in a strong magnetic field.

In political life, Lodge was an active member of the Fabian Society, and published two Fabian Tracts: Socialism & Individualism (1905), and Public Service versus Private Expenditure, co-authored with Sidney Webb, George Bernard Shaw, and Sidney Ball. They invited him several times to lecture at the London School of Economics.

In 1889, Lodge was appointed President of the Liverpool Physical Society, a position he held until 1893. The society still runs to this day, though under a student body. In 1901, he was elected as a member of the American Philosophical Society.

Lodge was President of the British Association in 1912–1913. In his 1913 Presidential Address to the Association, he affirmed his belief in the persistence of the human personality after death, the possibility of communicating with disembodied intelligent beings, and the validity of the Aether theory.

== Paranormal investigations ==
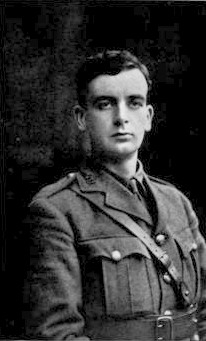
Oliver Lodge's youngest son, Raymond, was killed in World War I. Oliver believed he had succeeded in contacting Raymond in the afterlife.

Lodge is remembered for his studies in psychical research and spiritualism. He began to study psychical phenomena (chiefly telepathy) in the late 1880s, was a member of The Ghost Club, and served as president of the London-based Society for Psychical Research from 1901 to 1903. After his son, Raymond, was killed in World War I in 1915, he visited several mediums and wrote about the experience in a number of books, including the best-selling Raymond; or, Life and Death (1916). Lodge was a friend of Arthur Conan Doyle, who also lost a son in World War I and was a Spiritualist.

Lodge was a Christian Spiritualist. In 1909, he published the book Survival of Man which expressed his belief that life after death had been demonstrated by mediumship. His most controversial book was Raymond or Life and Death (1916). The book documented the séances that he and his wife had attended with the medium Gladys Osborne Leonard. Lodge was convinced that his son Raymond had communicated with him and the book is a description of his son's experiences in the spirit world. According to the book Raymond had reported that those who had died were still the same people that they had been on earth before they "passed over". There were houses, trees and flowers in the Spirit world, which was similar to the earthly realm, although there was no disease. The book also claimed that when soldiers died in World War I they had smoked cigars and received whisky in the spirit world and because of such statements the book was criticised. Walter Cook wrote a rebuttal to Lodge, titled Reflections on Raymond (1917), that directly challenged Lodge's beliefs in Spiritualism.

Although Lodge was convinced that Leonard's spirit control "Feda" had communicated with his son, he admitted a good deal of the information was nonsense and suggested that Feda picked it up from a séance sitter. Philosopher Paul Carus wrote that the "story of Raymond's communications rather excels all prior tales of mediumistic lore in the silliness of its revelations. But the saddest part of it consists in the fact that a great scientist, no less a one than Sir Oliver Lodge, has published the book and so stands sponsor for it."

Scientific work on electromagnetic radiation convinced Lodge that an ether existed and that it filled the entire universe. Lodge came to believe that the spirit world existed in the ether. As a Christian Spiritualist, Lodge had written that the resurrection in the Bible referred to Christ's etheric body becoming visible to his disciples after the Crucifixion. By the 1920s the physics of the ether had been undermined by the theory of relativity, however, Lodge still defended his ether theory arguing in "Ether and Reality" that it was not inconsistent with the theory of general relativity. Linked to his belief in Spiritualism, Lodge had also endorsed a theory of spiritual evolution which he promoted in Man and the Universe (1908) and Making of Man (1924). He lectured on theistic evolution at the Charing Cross Hospital and at Christ Church, Westminster. His lectures were published in a book Evolution and Creation (1926).

Historian Janet Oppenheim has noted that Lodge's interest in spiritualism "prompted some of his fellow scientists to wonder if his mind, too, had not been wrecked." In 1913 the biologist Ray Lankester criticized the Spiritualist views of Lodge as unscientific and misleading the public.

Edward Clodd criticised Lodge as being an incompetent researcher to detect fraud and claimed his Spiritualist beliefs were based on magical thinking and primitive superstition. Charles Arthur Mercier (a leading British psychiatrist) wrote in his book Spiritualism and Sir Oliver Lodge (1917) that Lodge had been duped into believing mediumship by trickery and his Spiritualist views were based on assumptions and not scientific evidence. Francis Jones in the American Journal of Psychology in a review for Lodge's The Survival of Man wrote that his psychical claims are not scientific and the book is one-sided as it does not contain research from experimental psychology.

Magician John Booth noted that the stage mentalist David Devant managed to fool a number of people into believing he had genuine psychic ability who did not realize that his feats were magic tricks. At St. George's Hall, London he performed a fake "clairvoyant" act where he would read a message sealed inside an envelope. Lodge who was present in the audience was duped by the trick and claimed that Devant had used psychic powers. In 1936, Devant in his book Secrets of My Magic revealed the trick method he had used.

Lodge had endorsed a clairvoyant medium known as "Annie Brittain". However, she made entirely incorrect guesses about a policeman who was disguised as a farmer. She was arrested and convicted for fraudulent fortune telling. Joseph McCabe wrote a skeptical book on the Spiritualist beliefs of Lodge entitled The Religion of Sir Oliver Lodge (1914).

== Personal life and death ==
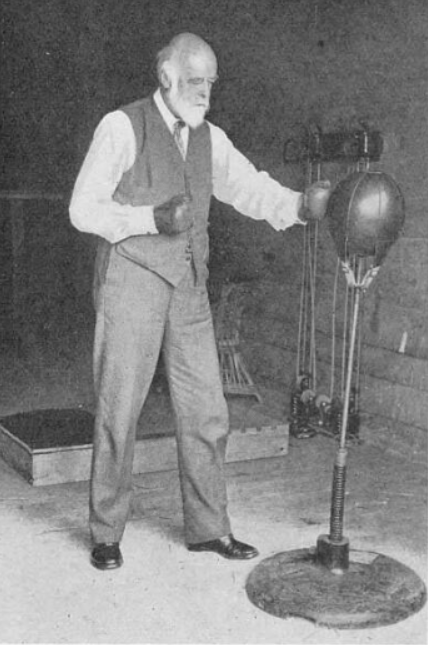
Lodge keeping fit at his home, 1930.

In 1877, Lodge married Mary Fanny Alexander Marshall at St George's Church in Newcastle-under-Lyme. They had twelve children—six boys and six girls—including Oliver, Alexander (Alec), Francis, Lionel, and Noel. Four of his sons went into business using Lodge's inventions. Brodie and Alec created the Lodge Plug Company, which manufactured spark plugs for cars and aeroplanes. Lionel and Noel founded a company that produced an electrostatic device for cleaning factory and smelter smoke in 1913, called the Lodge Fume Deposit Company Limited (changed in 1919 to Lodge Fume Company Limited and in 1922, through agreement with the International Precipitation Corporation of California, to Lodge Cottrell Ltd). Oliver, the eldest son, became a poet and author.

After his retirement in 1920, Lodge and his wife settled in Normanton House, near Lake in Wiltshire, a few miles from Stonehenge.

Lodge died on 22 August 1940 in Wilsford cum Lake at the age of 89. His wife Mary predeceased him in 1929. They are buried together at the local parish church, St. Michael's, in Wilsford cum Lake, Wiltshire. Their eldest son Oliver and eldest daughter Violet are also buried at the church.

His obituary in The Times wrote:

Always an impressive figure, tall and slender with a pleasing voice and charming manner, he enjoyed the affection and respect of a very large circle… Lodge's gifts as an expounder of knowledge were of a high order, and few scientific men have been able to set forth abstruse facts in a more lucid or engaging form… Those who heard him on a great occasion, as when he gave his Romanes lecture at Oxford or his British Association presidential address at Birmingham, were charmed by his alluring personality as well as impressed by the orderly development of his thesis. But he was even better in informal debate, and when he rose, the audience, however perplexed or jaded, settled down in a pleased expectation that was never disappointed.

== Recognition ==
=== Memberships ===
Year	Organisation	Type	Ref.
1887	Royal Society	Fellow	
1901	American Philosophical Society	International Member	

=== Awards ===
Year	Organisation	Award	Citation	Ref.
1898	Royal Society	Rumford Medal	"For his researches in radiation and in the relations between matter and ether."	
1919	Royal Society of Arts	Albert Medal	—	
1932	Institution of Electrical Engineers	Faraday Medal	—	

=== Honorary degrees ===
Year	University	Degree	Ref.
1901	University of Glasgow	Doctor of Laws	

=== Honours ===
Year	Country	Honour	Ref.
1902	United Kingdom	Knight Bachelor	

== Commemoration ==
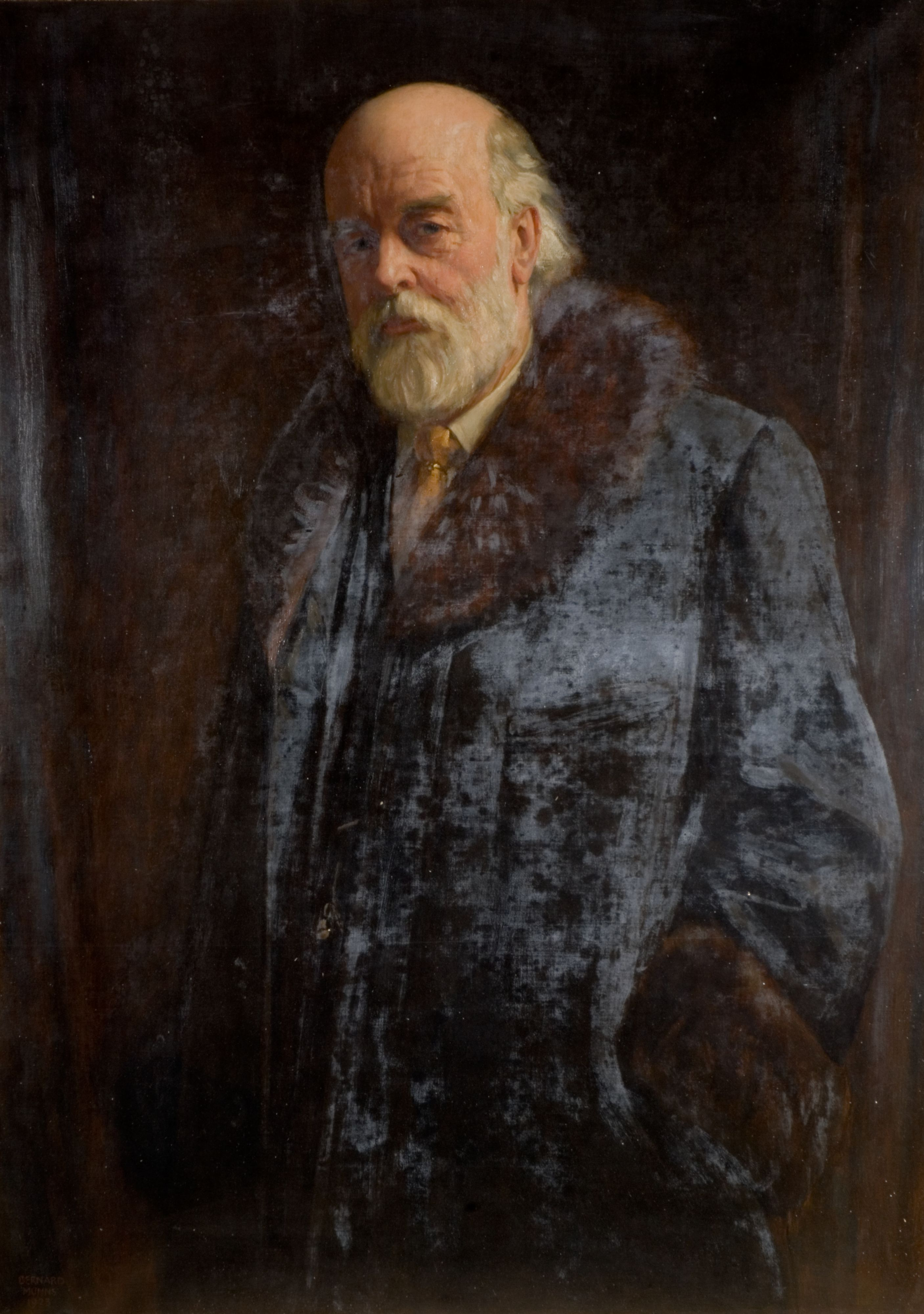
Sir Oliver Lodge by John Bernard Munns, 1923

Oliver Lodge Primary School in Vanderbijlpark, South Africa is named in his honour.

Lodge is commemorated in Liverpool with a bronze figure entitled Education, at the base of the Queen Victoria Monument and the Oliver Lodge Building which houses the physics department of the University of Liverpool.

== Lodge archives ==
Lodge's letters and papers were divided after his death. Some were deposited at the University of Birmingham and University of Liverpool and others at the Society for Psychical Research and the University College London. Lodge was long-lived and a prolific letter writer and other letters of his survive in the personal papers of other individuals and several other universities and other institutions. Among the known collections of his papers are the following:

- The University of Birmingham Special Collections holds over 2000 items of Lodge's correspondence relating to family, co-workers at Birmingham and Liverpool Universities and also from numerous religious, political and literary figures. The collection also includes a number of Lodge's diaries, photographs and newscuttings relating to his scientific research and scripts of his published work. There are also an additional 212 letters of Lodge which have been acquired over the years (1881–1939).
- The University of Liverpool holds some notebooks and letters of Oliver Lodge and also has a laboratory named after him, the main administrative centre of the Physics Department where the majority of lecturers and researchers have their offices.
- University College London Special Collections hold 1991 items of Lodge's correspondence between 1871 and 1938.
- The Society for Psychical Research holds 2710 letters written to Oliver Lodge.
- Devon Record Office holds Lodge's letters to Sir Thomas Acland (1907–1908).
- The University of Glasgow Library holds Lodge's letters to William Macneile Dixon (1900–1938).
- The University of St Andrews has twenty-three letters from Lodge to Wilfrid Ward (1896–1908).
- Trinity College Dublin is custodian of Lodge's correspondence with John Joly.
- Imperial College, London Archives hold nineteen letters Lodge wrote to his fellow scientist, Silvanus Thompson.
- The London Science Museum holds an early notebook of Oliver Lodge's dated 1880, correspondence dating from 1894 to 1913 and a paper on atomic theory.

== Publications ==
Lodge wrote more than 40 books, about the afterlife, aether, relativity, and electromagnetic theory.

- Modern Views of Electricity, 1889
- Pioneers of Science, 1893
- The Work of Hertz and Some of His Successors, 1894 (after Signalling Through Space Without Wires, 1900)
- Modern Views on Matter, 1903
- Electric Theory of Matter. Harper's Magazine. 1904. (O'Neill's Electronic Museum)
- "Mind and Matter": A Criticism of Professor Haeckel, 1904
- Life and Matter, 1905
- Public Service versus Private Expenditure, co-authored with Sidney Webb, 1905
- The Substance of Faith Allied With Science. A Catechism for Parents and Teachers, 1907
- Electrons, or The Nature and Properties of Negative Electricity, 1907
- Man and the Universe, Methuen, London, 1908
- Science and Immortality, New York, Moffat, Yard and Co., 1908.
- Survival of Man, 1909
- The Ether of Space, May 1909. ISBN 1-4021-8302-X (paperback), ISBN 1-4021-1766-3 (hardcover)
- Reason and Belief, 1910. Book Tree. February 2000. ISBN 1-58509-226-6
- Modern Problems, 1912
- Science and Religion, 1914
- The war and after; short chapters on subjects of serious practical import for the average citizen from A.D. 1915 onwards, 1915
- Raymond or Life and Death, 1916
- Christopher, 1918
- Raymond Revised, 1922
- The Making of Man, 1924
- Of Atoms and Rays, 1924
- Ether and Reality, 1925. ISBN 0-7661-7865-X
- Relativity – A very elementary exposition. Paperback. Methuen & Co. Ltd. London. 11 June 1925
- Talks About Wireless, 1925
- Ether, Encyclopædia Britannica, Thirteenth Edition, 1926
- Evolution and Creation, 1926
- Science and Human Progress, 1927
- Modern Scientific Ideas. Benn's Sixpenny Library No. 101, 1927
- Why I Believe in Personal Immortality, 1928
- Phantom Walls, 1929
- Beyond Physics, or The Idealization of Mechanism, 1930
- The Reality of a Spiritual World, 1930
- Conviction of Survival, 1930
- Advancing Science, 1931
- Past Years: An Autobiography. 1931 Hodder and Stoughton Ltd, London, 1930; Charles Scribner & Sons, 1932; Cambridge University Press, 2012
- Letters from Sir Oliver Lodge, psychical, religious, scientific and personal, London, Cassell and Company, Ltd
- My Philosophy, 1933

== See also ==
Notable relatives of Oliver Lodge

- Samuel Lodge, clergyman & author (uncle)
- Alfred Lodge, mathematician (brother)
- Sir Richard Lodge, historian (brother)
- Eleanor Constance Lodge, historian (sister)
- Alexander Lodge, inventor (son)
- Oliver W F Lodge, poet and author (son)
- Percy John Heawood, mathematician (cousin)
- Carron O Lodge, artist (cousin)
- George Edward Lodge, artist (cousin)
- Francis Graham Lodge, artist (second cousin)
- Tom Lodge, author & radio broadcaster (grandson)
- Fiona Godlee, physician and editor (great-granddaughter)
- David Trotman, mathematician (great-grandson)

== Notes ==
Academic offices
New institution	Vice-Chancellor of the University of Birmingham; 1900–1920	Succeeded by Charles Grant Robertson
