= Lodge Plugs =

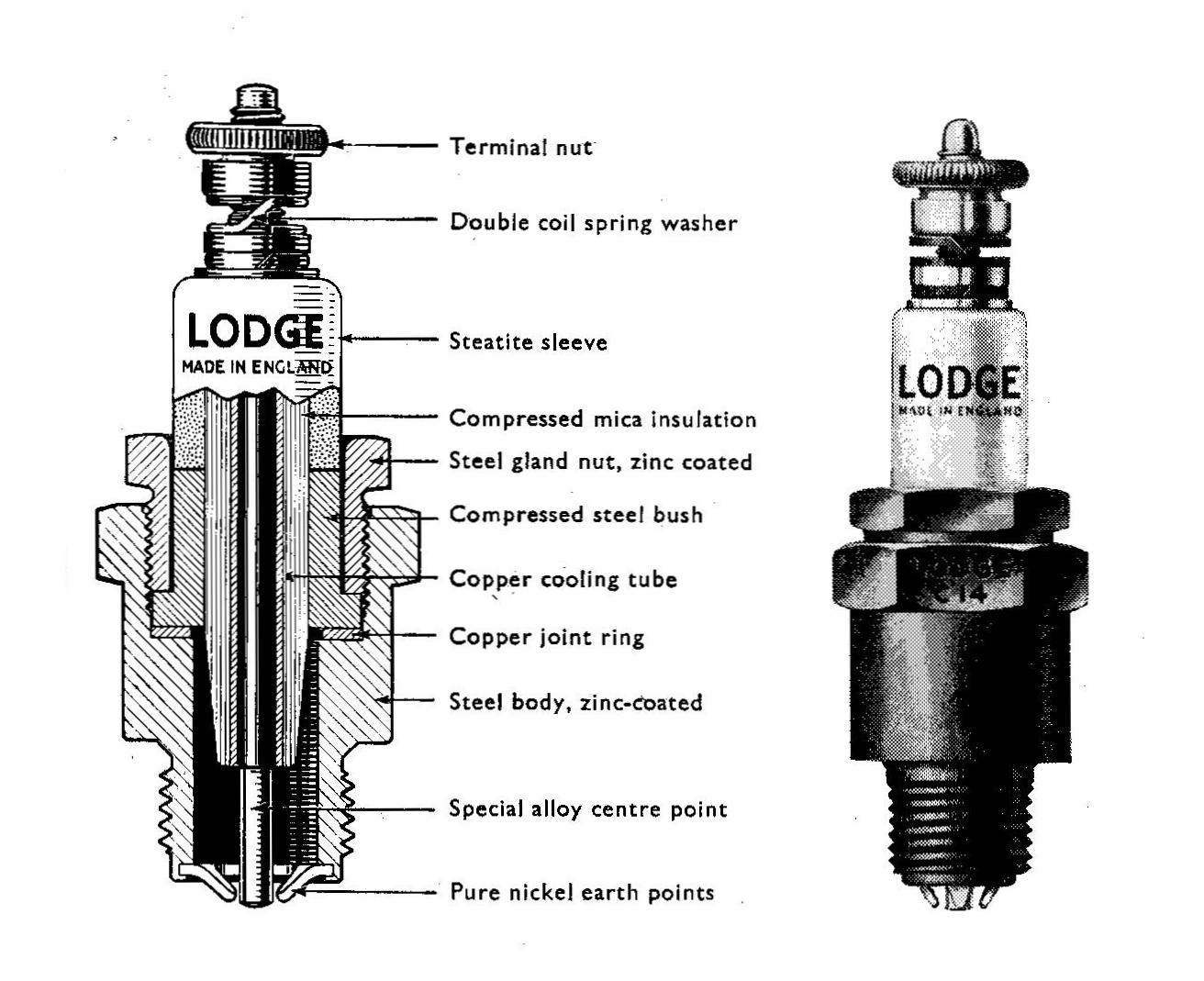
Diagram of Lodge spark plugs from 1935 Autocar Handbook

Lodge Plugs were a British manufacturer of spark plugs based in Birmingham and Rugby, Warwickshire.

The company had its origins in the work of Sir Oliver Lodge (1851-1940), who was a pioneer in the field of electromagnetism. Two of his sons Francis (Brodie) and Alexander Lodge, decided to turn their father's discoveries onto a commercial venture. They set up business in Birmingham in 1904 as the Lodge Brothers. Initially, the Sphinz Sparking Plug Company produced spark plugs for them in Birmingham, but they later established their own factory.

In 1913 the Lodge Brothers amalgamated with the Mascot Company of Rugby, which had been founded by another inventor Bernard Hopps, who had left the British Thomson-Houston company in 1908 to start his own business. The new firm was called the Lodge Sparking Plug Company Ltd. Following the merger, production initially took place in part of the Hunter's Lamp factory in Lower Hillmorton Road, Rugby and later on in Albert Street, before a dedicated factory was opened on St Peter's Road, Rugby, in 1916, whilst the main offices remained in Birmingham. In 1919, the name was shortened to Lodge Plugs Ltd

The company set up a second factory in Olney, Buckinghamshire in 1940 in order to cater for the increased demand due to World War II. During this period, three quarters of Lodge's output went to the Royal Air Force (RAF) and the United States Air Force (USAF). The Olney factory lasted until the 1950s.

Alexander Lodge died in 1938, leaving Hopps and Brodie in control of the firm. In 1949 Brodie retired from the company after 45 years, and the company was launched on the stock exchange, with Hopps becoming its Chairman and Managing Director. In 1961 the company was purchased by Smiths Industries, who already owned KLG Plugs. The Lodge Plugs brand name continued to be used until 1982. Production was then moved to Italy, and the plugs were marketed under the name "Golden Lodge"

The Rugby factory on St Peter's Road, continued to supply Sintox products, marketed under the name of Lodge Ceramics Ltd, until 1992, when it was sold to Morgan Matroc. In 2005, the factory was closed and redeveloped for housing, and production was moved to a new factory in Central Park, Rugby, under the name of Morgan Advanced Materials.
