= Carron Lodge =

English painter

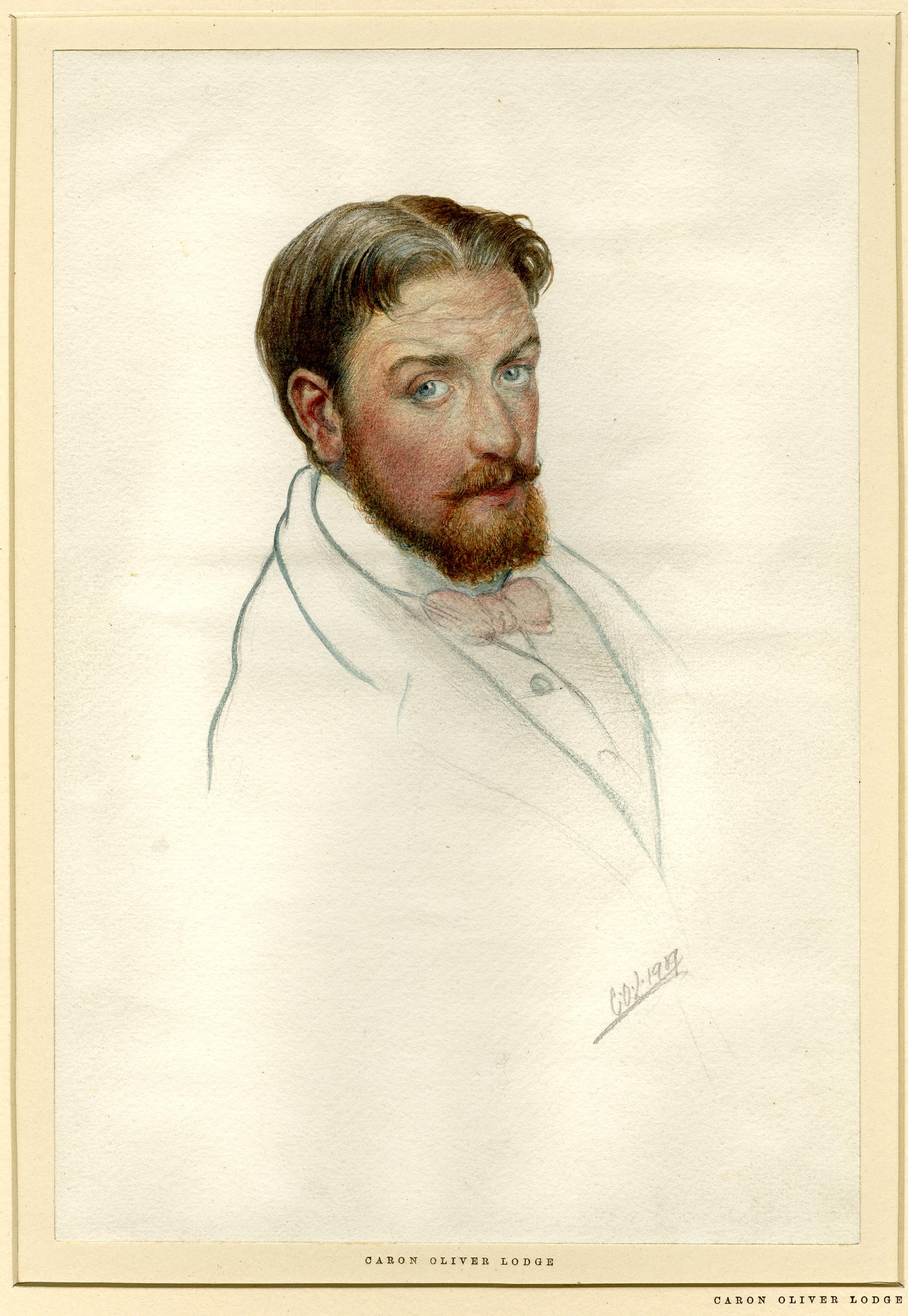
- Self-portrait' (1909)
- Born: Carron Angus Cyril Oliver Lodge; Feb 1883; Koolkerke, Bruges, Belgium
- Died: 24 June 1910; 14 Belgrave Road, St John's Wood, London, England
- Education: Royal Academy
- Spouse: Winifred King (m. 1907; death. 1910)
- Children: 2 including Francis Graham Lodge

Carron Angus Cyril Oliver Lodge (born 1882, in Bruges, Belgium – 24 June 1910, in London) was an English figure and landscape painter.

The son of a barrister, he trained as an artist and was a Royal Academy Schools student from 27 January 1903 to January 1908. He went on to exhibit at the Royal Academy between 1906 and 1910. Lodge was the father of the black and white artist Francis Graham Lodge. At the age of 27, Carron Lodge died at home from an overdose of sulphonal. At the time his wife Winifred was expecting their second child.

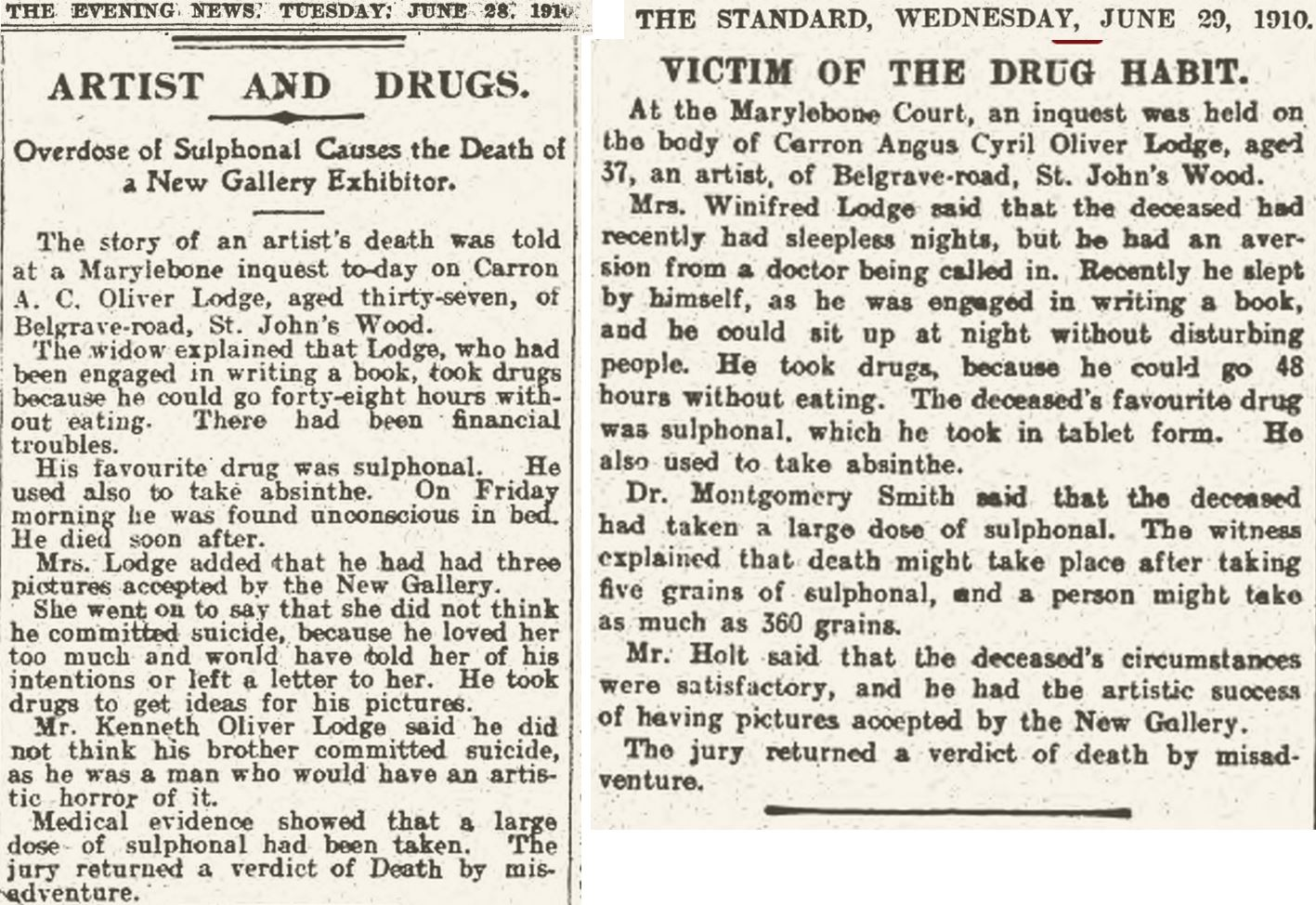
Newspaper clippings of Carron Lodge's death in June 1910

== Exhibits ==
- Royal Academy
  - Cat No. 1048 Commerce in 1906
  - Cat No. 1453 The Good Samaritan in 1907
    - A watercolour drawing depicting a study for The Good Samaritan was given to the V&A by Carron's sister, Miss Winifred M. Lodge. The watercolour can be viewed in the V&A Collections Signed 'C. O. Lodge. 1905.'
- New English Art Club in 1910
  - Cat No. 65 The Path to the Monastery
  - Cat No. 109 The King's Vision
  - Cat No. 162 Nativity
- Royal Society of Artists, Birmingham (1)
- Walker Art Gallery, Liverpool (1)
- London Salon (6)
- British Museum
  - A self-portrait watercolour given to the British Museum by Carron's sister, Miss Winifred Lodge. The self-portrait can be viewed in the British Museum Collections

== Residences ==
- 1907 at 9 Gatestone Rd, Upper Norwood, SE
- 1910 at 14 Belgrave Road, London NW (where he died)

== Excerpt from The Academy (periodical) July–December 1910 Volume LXXIX ==
Publishing Office: 67, Long Acre, W.C.

THE LONDON SALON

The Committee of the Third London Salon of the Allied Artists’ Association, Ltd., express a regret in their catalogue that the number of exhibits this year does not come up to their expectations. We are afraid that we cannot share their sorrow. To examine critically some twelve hundred odd exhibits in one day is a sufficient trial, even in the most favourable circumstances; but when, in addition, it is necessary to wander about the Albert Hall and risk one’s neck climbing over chairs to get at some of the pictures, the task is already almost superhuman. It may be that these adverse conditions have slightly jaundiced our purview, but, at any rate, we left the hall with the idea that the dreary show of unimaginative, uninspired art was usurping the most cherished prerogative of the Royal Academy. With one solitary exception, there is not—at least, as far as the pictures are concerned—a single glimpse of even embryo genius in the whole lot. The example that proves the rule is the work of a young man whose untimely death has robbed the world of one who promised to become a great artist. Caron Oliver Lodge possessed imagination and skill; his line work was as sure and graceful as Watteau, while his interpretation of his own dreams was instinct with real horror and fear. His death is a loss to art. But looking over the remainder, it is a matter of surprise how many mediocrities dub themselves artists. At the most five per cent, of the exhibitors call for any attention at all, and a good half of them are to be noted more for their faults than their virtues.

== Notable relatives ==
First Cousins Once Removed

- Sir Oliver Lodge (scientist)
- Sir Richard Lodge (historian)
- George Edward Lodge (artist)
- Eleanor Constance Lodge

Second Cousin

- Oliver W. F. Lodge
