= Peter Ridgway =

English cricketer (born 1972)

Personal information
- Full name: Peter Frederick Ridgway
- Born: 15 July 1972 (age 54); Penkhull, Staffordshire, England
- Batting: Left-handed
- Bowling: Right-arm fast-medium

Domestic team information
- Years: Team
- 1991–1996: Staffordshire

Career statistics
Competition	List A
Matches	2
Runs scored	47
Batting average	–
100s/50s	0/0
Top score	47*
Balls bowled	120
Wickets	5
Bowling average	20.60
5 wickets in innings	0
10 wickets in match	0
Best bowling	4/62
Catches/stumpings	1/–
- Source: CricInfo, 15 June 2011

Peter Frederick Ridgway (born 15 July 1972) is a former English cricketer. Ridgway was a left-handed batsman who bowled right-arm fast-medium. He was born in Penkhull, Staffordshire.

Ridgway made his debut for Staffordshire County Cricket Club in the 1991 Minor Counties Championship against Durham. He played Minor counties cricket for Staffordshire from 1991 to 1996, which included 11 Minor Counties Championship matches and two MCCA Knockout Trophy matches. In 1995, he made his List A cricket debut against Kent in the NatWest Trophy. He played a further List A match against Derbyshire in the 1996 NatWest Trophy. In his two List A matches, he scored an unbeaten 47 runs against Derbyshire, while with the ball, he took five wickets at a bowling average of 20.60, with best figures of 4/62.
