= Reg Forester =

English footballer

Personal information
- Full name: Reginald Forester
- Date of birth: 20 March 1892
- Place of birth: Penkhull, Stoke-upon-Trent, England
- Date of death: 9 December 1959 (aged 67)
- Place of death: Newcastle-Under-Lyme, England
- Height: 5 ft 10 in (1.78 m)
- Position: Left half

Senior career*
| Years | Team | Apps | (Gls) |
- Kidsgrove Wellington
| 1911 | Manchester City | 0 | (0) |
| 1912–1921 | Stoke | 8 | (0) |
| 1922–1924 | Macclesfield | 32 | (30) |
| – | Congleton Town | | |
| Total | | 40 | (30) |
- * Club domestic league appearances and goals

Reginald Forester (20 March 1892 – 9 December 1959) was an English footballer who played for Stoke.

== Career ==
Forester was born in Penkhull and began his career with Kidsgrove Wellington. He joined Manchester City in 1911 but failed to make an appearance and left for Stoke in 1912. He played twice for Stoke before World War I and following the hostilities he played seven matches in 1920–21. He left at the end of the season for non-league Macclesfield and then Congleton Town.

== Career statistics ==
Appearances and goals by club, season and competition
| Club | Season | League | | | FA Cup | | Other | | Total | |
| Club | Season | Division | Apps | Goals | Apps | Goals | Apps | Goals | Apps | Goals |
|---|---|---|---|---|---|---|---|---|---|---|
| Stoke | 1913–14 | Southern League Division Two | 1 | 0 | 0 | 0 | — | | 1 | 0 |
| Stoke | 1914–15 | Southern League Division Two | 0 | 0 | 1 | 0 | — | | 1 | 0 |
| Stoke | 1919–20 | Second Division | 0 | 0 | 0 | 0 | — | | 0 | 0 |
| Stoke | 1920–21 | Second Division | 7 | 0 | 0 | 0 | — | | 7 | 0 |
| Stoke | Total | | 8 | 0 | 1 | 0 | — | | 9 | 0 |
| Macclesfield | 1922–23 | Cheshire League | 29 | 30 | 1 | 0 | 10 | 17 | 40 | 47 |
| Macclesfield | 1923–24 | Cheshire League | 3 | 0 | 0 | 0 | 1 | 0 | 4 | 0 |
| Macclesfield | Total | | 32 | 30 | 1 | 0 | 11 | 17 | 44 | 47 |
| Career total | | | 40 | 30 | 2 | 0 | 11 | 17 | 53 | 47 |
