= Charles Tomlinson =

English poet, translator, and illustrator (1927–2015)

Charles Tomlinson CBE
- Born: 8 January 1927; Penkhull, England
- Died: 22 August 2015 (aged 88)
- Education: Queens' College, Cambridge; Royal Holloway
- Occupations: Poet, translator, academic, and illustrator
- Writing career
- Language: English

Alfred Charles Tomlinson (8 January 1927 – 22 August 2015) was an English poet, translator, academic, and illustrator. He was born in Penkhull, and grew up in Basford, Stoke-on-Trent, Staffordshire.

== Life ==
After attending Longton High School, Tomlinson read English at Queens' College, Cambridge, where he studied with Donald Davie. He married Brenda Raybould (1928–2019) in 1948 in Willesden and, during a happy and enduring marriage, had two daughters: Justine (born 1957) and Juliet (born 1961), both of whom became professional musicians. After leaving university he taught for several years in Camden Town, London, followed by a brief period as secretary to Percy Lubbock in Italy, before returning to London as an M.A. student at Royal Holloway, University of London. He subsequently taught for thirty-six years in the English Department of Bristol University, where he became Emeritus Professor. He was also a graphic artist, and In Black and White: The Graphics of Charles Tomlinson, with an introduction by Nobel prize-winner Octavio Paz, was published in 1975 and was the focus of a December 1975 edition of the BBC television series Arena.

== Poetry ==
Tomlinson's first book of poetry was published in 1951, and his Collected Poems was published by the Oxford University Press in 1985, followed by the Selected Poems: 1955–1997 in 1997. His poetry won international recognition and received many prizes in Europe and the United States, including the 1993 Bennett Award from Hudson Review; the New Criterion Poetry Prize, 2002; the Premio Internazionale di Poesie Ennio Flaiano, 2001; and the Premio Internazionale di Poesia Attilio Bertolucci, 2004. He was an Honorary Fellow of the American Academy of the Arts and Sciences and of the Modern Language Association. Tomlinson was made a CBE in 2001 for his contribution to literature. His Selected Poems, his collections Skywriting, Metamorphoses, and The Vineyard Above the Sea, among others, are published by Carcanet Press. His last collection, Cracks in the Universe, was published in May 2006 in Carcanet Press' Oxford Poets series.

In his book Some Americans Tomlinson acknowledges his poetic debts to modern American poetry, in particular William Carlos Williams, George Oppen, Marianne Moore, and Louis Zukofsky, as well as artists like Georgia O'Keeffe and Arshile Gorky. In his critical study Lives of Poets, Michael Schmidt observes that 'Wallace Stevens was the guiding star [Tomlinson] initially steered by'. Schmidt goes on to define the two characteristic voices of Tomlinson: "one is intellectual, meditative, feeling its way through ideas" while the other engages with "landscapes and images from the natural world". Tomlinson's poetry often circles around these themes of place and return, exploring his native landscape of Stoke and the shifting cityscape of modern Bristol. In his poem "Against Extremity", Tomlinson expresses distrust of confessional verse and rejects the "willed extremism of poets like Sylvia Plath and Anne Sexton". The inspired poem is dedicated to the Argentine philosopher and poet Eduardo Sanguinetti, which he calls "Dialectic".

From 1985 to 2000, Tomlinson recorded all of his published poetry for Keele University as well as his translations (with Henry Gifford) of poetry by Antonio Machado and Fyodor Tyutchev. He also recorded The Waste Land by T. S. Eliot. All these recordings, apart from The Waste Land, but including Tomlinson's interviews with Octavio Paz, Hugh Kenner and Sean Street, can be heard online at the Charles Tomlinson page of PennSound, University of Pennsylvania.

== Translations and editions ==
Tomlinson was an authoritative translator of poetry from Russian, Spanish and Italian, including work by Antonio Machado, Fyodor Tyutchev, César Vallejo, and Attilio Bertolucci. He collaborated with Octavio Paz, Jacques Roubaud and Edoardo Sanguinetti in the writing of Renga, and with Paz alone in the writing of Airborn/Hijos del Aire. He edited The Oxford Book of Verse in English Translation and the Selected Poems of William Carlos Williams. Other edited works include Marianne Moore: A Collection of Critical Essays, William Carlos Williams: A Critical Anthology, George Oppen: Selected Poems, Eros English'd: Classical Erotic Poetry in Translation from Golding to Hardy, and John Dryden: Poems. His poetry has been translated into Spanish by Jordi Doce and Octavio Paz, into Italian by Silvano Sabbadini, Edoardo Zuccato, and others, and into French by Michele Duclos.

== Works ==
- Relations and Contraries, Hand and Flower Press, 1951
- The Necklace, Fantasy Press, 1955; Oxford University Press,1966
- Seeing is Believing, McDowell, Obolensky, 1958; Oxford University Press, 1960
- A Peopled Landscape, Oxford University Press, 1963
- American Scenes and Other Poems, Oxford University Press, 1966
- The Way of a World, Oxford University Press, 1969
- Penguin Modern Poets, with Alan Brownjohn and Michael Hamburger, Penguin 1969
- America West Southwest, San Marcos Press, 1970
- Renga: A Chain of Poems, with Octavio Paz, Jacques Roubaud, and Edoardo Sanguineti. (Braziller, 1971)
- Written on Water, Oxford University Press, 1972
- The Way in and Other Poems, Oxford University Press, 1974
- In Black and White: The Graphics of Charles Tomlinson, Carcanet, 1975
- The Shaft, Oxford University Press, 1978
- Selected Poems 1951–1974, Oxford University Press, 1978
- Airborn/Hijos del Aire, with Octavio Paz, Anvil Press,1981
- Some Americans: A Personal Record, University of California Press, 1981
- Isaac Rosenberg of Bristol, Bristol Historical Association pamphlets, no. 53, 1982
- Poetry and Metamorphosis, Cambridge University Press, 1983
- Notes from New York and Other Poems, Oxford University Press, 1984
- Collected Poems, Oxford University Press, 1985, 1987
- Eden: Graphics and Poetry, Redcliffe Press, 1985
- The Return, Oxford University Press, 1987
- Annunciations, Oxford University Press, 1989; Carcanet Press, 1999
- The Door in the Wall, Oxford University Press, 1992; Carcanet Press, 1999
- Jubilation, Oxford University Press, 1995
- Selected Poems 1955–1997, Oxford University Press,1997; Carcanet Press, 1999
- The Vineyard Above the Sea, Carcanet Press, 1999
- American Essays: Making it New, Carcanet Press, 2001
- Metamorphoses: Poetry and Translation, Carcanet Press, 2003
- Skywriting, Carcanet Press, 2003
- Cracks in the Universe, Carcanet Press, 2006
- New Collected Poems, Carcanet Press, 2009
- Swimming Chenango Lake: Selected Poems, Carcanet Press, 2018

== Recordings ==
- The complete volumes from "The Necklace" to "The Vineyard Above the Sea," Keele University, 1985–2000
- "The Modern Age: A Conversation with Hugh Kenner," Keele University, 1988
- "Charles Tomlinson Reads His Poems," Keele University, 1985
- "Charles Tomlinson Reads His Stoke Poems," Keele University, 1985
- "Charles Tomlinson Reads His Poems on Music," Keele University, 1987
- "Charles Tomlinson Reads The Waste Land by T. S. Eliot," Keele University, 1989
- "Octavio Paz Talks to Charles Tomlinson," Keele University, 1989
- "Charles Tomlinson Reads Machado and Tyutchev," Keele University, 1993
- "Charles Tomlinson Reads Selected Poems by Attilio Bertolucci," Keele University, 1995
