= Alexander Lodge =

Alexander Marshall Lodge (1881–1938) was an English inventor who did early work and held some patents on the spark plug. He and his brother Francis Brodie Lodge (1880–1967) founded a company, Lodge Brothers, in 1903 – which eventually, following a merger with the Mascot Company in 1913, was renamed Lodge Plugs Ltd; it was based in Rugby, Warwickshire. Much of their work was developed from research by their father, Sir Oliver Lodge.

Alec Lodge died on 17 February 1938, aged 56.
