= Alfred Lodge =

English mathematician and author

- Born: 1854; Penkhull, Staffordshire
- Died: 1 December 1937 (aged 82–83); Oxford
- Education: Magdalen College, Oxford
- Known for: president of The Mathematical Association
- Scientific career
- Fields: Mathematics
- Workplaces: St John's College, Oxford, Royal Indian Engineering College

Professor Alfred Lodge MA (1854 – 1 December 1937), was an English mathematician, author, and the first president of The Mathematical Association.

Alfred Lodge was born in 1854 at Penkhull, Staffordshire, one of nine children to Oliver Lodge (1826–1884) and Grace, née Heath (1826–1879). His siblings included physicist Sir Oliver Lodge, and historians Sir Richard Lodge and Eleanor Constance Lodge. He attended Horncastle Grammar School, afterwards studying at Magdalen College, Oxford. In 1876 he became a fellow of St John's College, Oxford, and in 1884 joined the Royal Indian Engineering College at Egham, there becoming a professor of pure mathematics, succeeding Joseph Wolstenholme in 1889. From 1904 until after the First World War he was a master at Charterhouse School. In 1897 Lodge became the first president of The Mathematical Association after its name change from The Association for the Improvement of Geometrical Teaching.

Lodge was at times associated with his brother Oliver Lodge's preoccupation with psychic phenomena, although stating that his interest only lay where this seemed to apply to mathematics.

Alfred Lodge died at Oxford on 1 December 1937. He was father of two sons, Charles and Christopher.

== Selected publications ==
- 1895 – Mensuration for senior students. ISBN 1130347621
- 1899 – Matter, Ether and Motion: The Factors and Relations of Physical Science, edited English edition by Professor Alfred Lodge.
- 1904 – Elementary mechanics including hydrostatics and pneumatics, with Oliver Lodge and Charles S. Lodge. ISBN 1176576577
- 1905 – Differential Calculus for Beginners. ISBN 1147272581
- 1905 – Integral calculus for beginners. ISBN 1231963778
- 1906 – "Semi-convergent Series for JnX" in Report of the British Association for the Advancement of Science, 76th. Annual Meeting, York
- 1910 – "Reports on the State of Science" committee report on The Further tabulation of Bessel Functions, for the British Association for the Advancement of Science, 80th Annual Meeting, Sheffield
- 1923 – Differential Calculus for Beginners – Primary Source Edition. ISBN 1293005665
- 1927 – "The Graphic Solution of Quadratic Equations", The Mathematical Gazette
- 1933 – paper on the "Larmor-Lorentz transformations", published in the Philosophical Magazine; co-written Oliver Lodge
