= Chidden =

Hamlet in Hampshire, England

Coordinates: 50.9500°N 1.0667°W

- Location within Hampshire
- OS grid reference: SU6566017144
- Civil parish: Hambledon
- District: City of Winchester
- Shire county: Hampshire
- Region: South East
- Country: England
- Sovereign state: United Kingdom
- Post town: Waterlooville
- Postcode district: GU34
- Dialling code: 01420
- Police: Hampshire and Isle of Wight
- Fire: Hampshire and Isle of Wight
- Ambulance: South Central

Chidden is a hamlet in Hampshire, England. It is in the parish of Hambledon 2 miles (3.2 km) north of Hambledon village, and is a former tithing of the parish. Its nearest town is Waterlooville, approximately 4.5 miles away. Its nearest railway station was formerly Droxford, on the Meon Valley Railway.

== Etymology ==
The origin of the name Chidden is not clear. The name is first attested in a charter of 956 (attested in a twelfth-century copy) in the form æt cittandene. The last element of this name is the Old English word denu ("valley"), but the origin of the first is less obvious. It looks at first sight like a personal name, *Citta, in which case Cittandenu meant "Citta's valley". However, the same charter and others indicate that the inhabitants of the area were called cittanware and citware. Again, the second element of this word is obviously an Old English word, this time ware ("inhabitants"), and the name suggests that cittan was an independent place-name in its own right. Thus Cittandenu meant "the valley at Cittan" and Cittanware meant "the inhabitants of Cittan". Although the name Cittan has not been satisfactorily explained, several scholars have taken it to begin with the Common Brittonic word that survives in Modern Welsh as coed.
