= Coed y Garth, Ceredigion =

Village in Ceredigion, Wales

Coordinates: 52°31′58″N 3°56′34″W

Coed y Garth
- Location within Ceredigion
- OS grid reference: SN 6832 9454
  - Cardiff: 79.7 mi (128.3 km)
  - London: 176.9 mi (284.7 km)
- Community: Ysgubor-y-coed
- Principal area: Ceredigion
- Country: Wales
- Sovereign state: United Kingdom
- Post town: Machynlleth
- Postcode district: SY20
- Police: Dyfed-Powys
- Fire: Mid and West Wales
- Ambulance: Welsh
- UK Parliament: Ceredigion Preseli
- Senedd Cymru – Welsh Parliament: Ceredigion Penfro

Coed y Garth is a small village in the community of Ysgubor-y-coed, Ceredigion, Wales, which is 79.7 miles (128.2 km) from Cardiff and 176.9 miles (284.7 km) from London. Coed y Garth is represented in the Senedd by Elin Jones (Plaid Cymru) and is part of the Ceredigion Preseli constituency in the House of Commons.

== See also ==
- List of localities in Wales by population
