= Plaitford =

Village and parish in Hampshire, England

Coordinates: 50.973°N 1.604°W

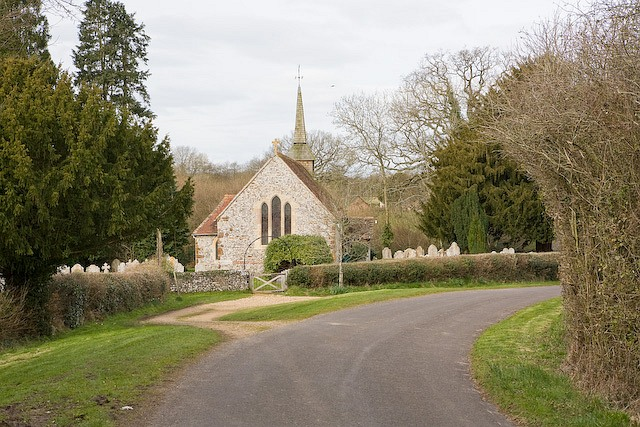
- St Peter's Church

- Location within Hampshire
- Population: 352
- OS grid reference: SU2785519329
- Civil parish: Melchet Park and Plaitford
- District: Test Valley
- Shire county: Hampshire
- Region: South East
- Country: England
- Sovereign state: United Kingdom
- Post town: ROMSEY
- Postcode district: SO51 6
- Police: Hampshire and Isle of Wight
- Fire: Hampshire and Isle of Wight
- Ambulance: South Central
- UK Parliament: Romsey and Southampton North

Plaitford (/ˈplætfəd/) is a small village and former civil parish, now in the parish of Melchet Park and Plaitford, in the Test Valley district of Hampshire, England. Its nearest town is Romsey, which lies approximately 4.9 miles (7.8 km) east from the village; the large village of West Wellow is immediately west of Plaitford. In 1931 the parish had a population of 195.

== Etymology ==
The name Plaitford is first attested in the Domesday Book of 1086, as Pleiteford. It takes its name from the Old English words *pleget ("playing field") and ford ("ford"). Thus it once meant "ford beside the playing field".

Nearby Melchet is one of the relatively few English place-names whose origin can be traced to Common Brittonic. The name is first attested, partly in Latin, as the name of a forest, rather than a settlement, in the Domesday Book of 1086, as Milchete silva and Milchet silva; it is first attested in fully English form as Melchetwode in 1255. The name is first attested, transferred from the forest as a settlement-name, in 1231, as Milchet; the modern spelling is first attested in 1275. The name contains that words that survive in modern Welsh as moel ("bare") and coed ("woodland"); thus it once meant "woodland on a bare [hill]".

== History and geography ==
Plaitford manor was anciently within the county of Wiltshire. By 1885 it had become a civil parish, which was transferred to Hampshire in 1895. On 1 April 1932, the parishes of Plaitford and Melchet Park (north of Plaitford and also formerly in Wiltshire) were amalgamated to form the parish of Melchet Park and Plaitford.

The original village of Plaitford lies to the north of the River Blackwater, a tributary of the River Test, but the chief part of the population is now found further south near the A36 road, which crosses the parish from east to west. Plaitford Green is a small district in the north of the parish. Plaitford Common, which occupies the southern portion of the parish, consists chiefly of rough grassland and is owned by the National Trust.

== St Peter's Church ==
Part of the church material dates from the 13th century as do parts of the font. Most of the church dates from a restoration in 1856.
