= David Lodge =

David Lodge may refer to:

- David Lodge (actor) (1921–2003), British character actor
- David Lodge (author) (1935–2025), British author
- David Lodge (scientist), Research Fellow at the University of Bristol
- David Lodge (voice actor), American voice actor
- David Lodge (biologist) (born 1957), American biologist
