= John Lodge =

John Lodge may refer to:

- John Lodge (musician) (1943–2025), English bass guitarist for the Moody Blues
- John Lodge (archivist) (1692–1774), English historian who wrote The Peerage of Ireland
- John C. Lodge (1862–1950), Mayor of Detroit
- John Davis Lodge (1903–1985), American film actor, politician, and diplomat
- John Lodge (librarian) (1792–1850), librarian of the University of Cambridge

== See also ==
- St. John's Lodge (disambiguation)
- John C. Lodge Freeway, route M-10 in southeast Michigan
- Governor John Davis Lodge Turnpike, usually known as the (former) Connecticut Turnpike
