= Richard Lodge =

British historian (1855–1936)

Sir Richard Lodge FRHistS
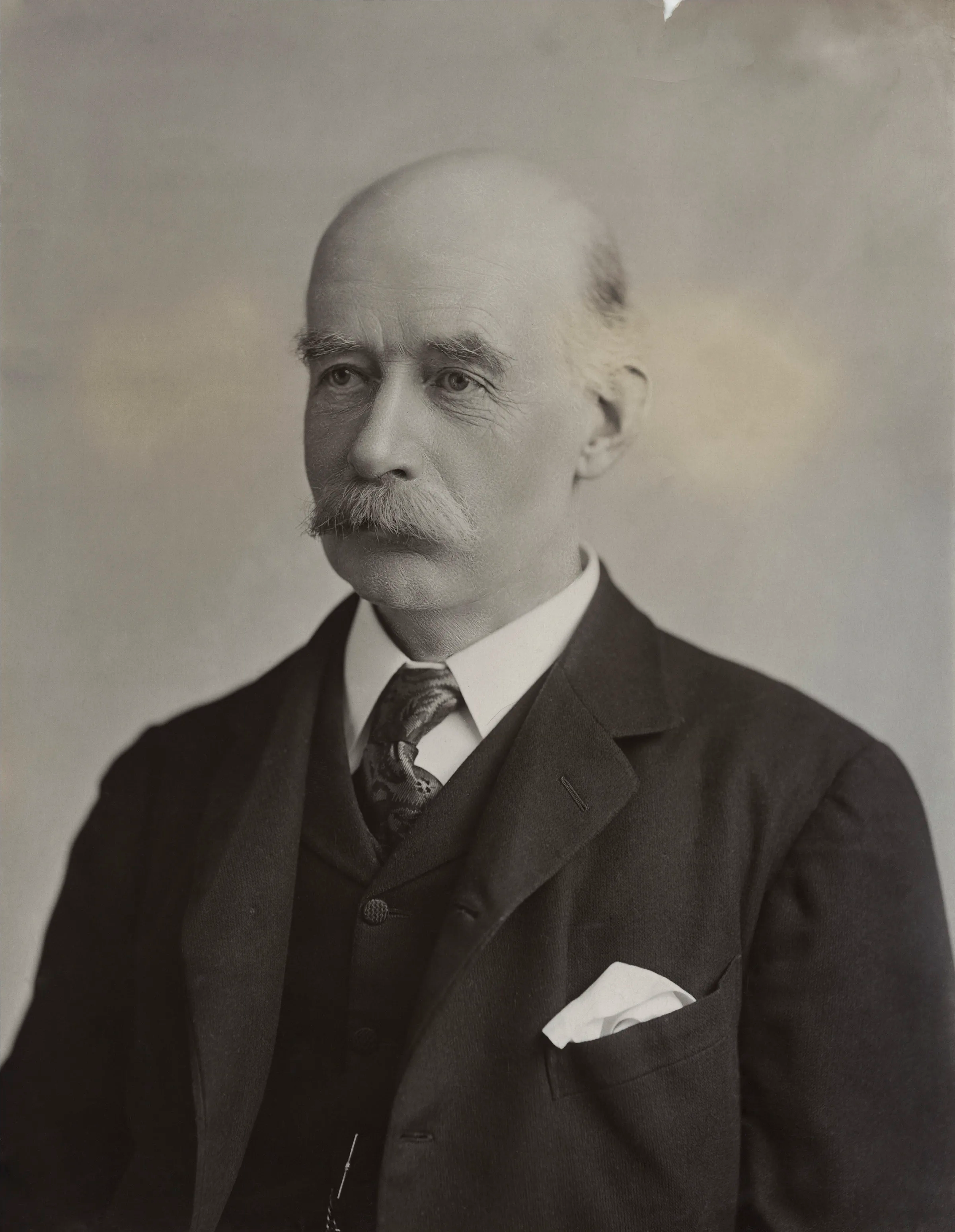
- Lodge in 1922
- Born: 20 June 1855; Penkhull, Staffordshire, England
- Died: 2 June 1936 (aged 80)
- Burial place: Holywell Cemetery, Oxford, England
- Relatives: Oliver Lodge (brother); Alfred Lodge (brother); Eleanor Constance Lodge (sister)

Academic background
- Education: Christ's Hospital; Balliol College, Oxford (BA)

Academic work
- Institutions: University of Glasgow; University of Edinburgh
- Notable works: Richelieu (1896)

Sir Richard Lodge FRHistS (20 June 1855 – 2 June 1936) was a British historian.

== Life ==
He was born at Penkhull, Staffordshire, the fourth of eight sons and a daughter of Oliver Lodge (1826–1884), later a china clay merchant at Wolstanton, Staffordshire, and his wife, Grace (née Heath) (1826–1879). His siblings included Sir Oliver Lodge (1851–1940), physicist; Eleanor Constance Lodge (1869–1936), historian and principal of Westfield College, London; and Alfred Lodge (1854–1937), mathematician.

Lodge was educated at Christ's Hospital, Newgate from 1865 to 1874. He matriculated at Balliol College, Oxford, in 1874, graduating with a B.A. in 1877, and becoming a Fellow of Brasenose College in 1878. He was Professor of History at the University of Glasgow from 1894 to 1899, and then Professor of History at the University of Edinburgh from 1899 to 1925. During his time at Edinburgh, he was appointed Dean of the Faculty of Arts at the university and was a founder of the Edinburgh University Settlement charity, which established houses for students and fellows to live amongst the poor of the city. He was a fellow of the Royal Historical Society and, in due course, became its president (1929–1933). He was knighted in 1917.

Lodge died on 2 June 1936 aged 80; he was buried at Holywell Cemetery, Oxford.

== Publications ==
Lodge’s many publications included a biography of Cardinal Richelieu in 1896. He also notably contributed in 1901 The Close of the Middle Ages 1273-1494, Period III of Rivington's "Periods of European History" series, which ran to several editions. Other contributors to this series included Charles Oman, Thomas Tout, H. Morse Stephens and Walter Alison Phillips.

Academic offices
Preceded by Thomas Frederick Tout	President of the Royal Historical Society; 1929–1933	Succeeded by F.M. Powicke
