= Francis Graham Lodge =

English painter

- Born: 17 June 1908; Burton-on-Trent, Staffordshire
- Died: 2002; Plymouth, Devon
- Occupation: Artist

Francis Graham Lodge (1908–2002) was a self-taught English black and white artist. He was born in Burton-on-Trent, Staffordshire, the son of artist Carron O Lodge, and was known by his second name Graham. His work was always signed F G Lodge. He was educated at King's School, Grantham, and University College, London, and also at London University. He served throughout the second World War, being invalided out of the forces in 1945, and subsequently taught in London schools.

Lodge exhibited at the Royal Academy in 1933. He was also an artist with Everyman (1929–1931), The Observer (1929–1934) and the Radio Times.

The Garrick Club commissioned Lodge to draw an exterior view of the club. The result is still on display inside the Garrick.

In 1951 it was noted that samples of his work had been acquired by the Belfast Art Gallery, the Bank of Scotland, the Athenaeum Club, Colonel Lord Wigram and Princess Mary, the daughter of King George V.

Two of his oil paintings are owned by Watford Museum.

== Published work ==
- Radio Times – 22 Dec 1933 Christmas Edition (0534)

8-page supplement 'A Local Habitation...’ with 14 drawings of 'buildings from which programmes are broadcast regularly' including full page illustration of 'The big studio at Edinburgh, headquarters of Scottish broadcasting'

- Anchorage on The Costa Brava – Author: Clyne, Douglas, Illustrations: F G Lodge, Publisher: Christopher Johnson 1957
- Martins Bank Magazine – Spring 1951 – The Stately Homes of England
