= Eleanor Lodge =

British academic (1869–1936)

Eleanor Lodge CBE FRHistS
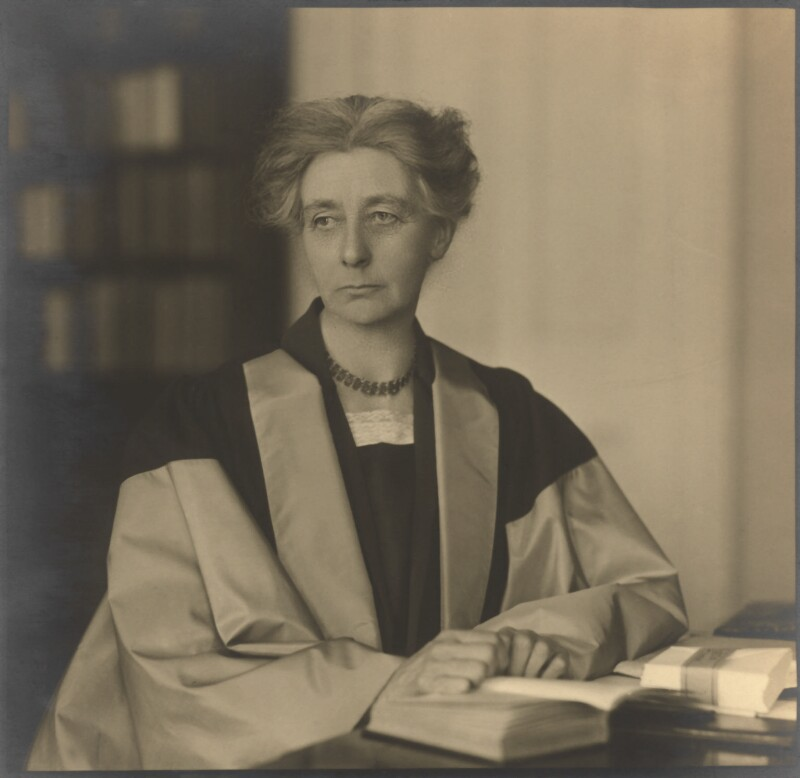
- Lodge in the mid-1930s
- Born: Eleanor Constance Lodge; 18 September 1869
- Died: 19 March 1936 (aged 66); Windsor, Berkshire
- Resting place: Wolvercote Cemetery

Academic background
- Education: Lady Margaret Hall, Oxford

Academic work
- Discipline: History
- Institutions: Lady Margaret Hall, Oxford; Westfield College

Principal of Westfield College
- In office 1921–1931
- Preceded by: Bertha Phillpotts
- Succeeded by: Dorothy Chapman

Eleanor Constance Lodge CBE FRHistS (18 September 1869 – 19 March 1936) was a British academic who served as vice-principal of Lady Margaret Hall, Oxford from 1906 to 1921 and then principal of Westfield College, Hampstead, in the University of London, from 1921 to 1931.

== Biography ==
Lodge was the youngest child, and only daughter, of Oliver Lodge (1826–1884), a china clay merchant, and his wife, Grace (née Heath) (1826–1879). Her siblings included Sir Oliver Lodge (1851–1940), a physicist; Sir Richard Lodge (1855–1936), a historian; and Alfred Lodge (1854–1937), a mathematician.

She studied history at Lady Margaret Hall from 1890 to 1894, achieving Second class honours at the end of her course. However, Oxford did not award degrees to women at the time; it was not until 1920 that she was conferred with an MA by decree of convocation, alongside other women who were tutors and principals at the university.

In 1895, Elizabeth Wordsworth asked her to come back to Lady Margaret Hall, where she became a librarian. She then studied in Paris, at the École des Chartes and the École des hautes études en sciences sociales, 1898–1899. In 1899, she started teaching history at Lady Margaret Hall as a tutor, and was appointed as vice-principal in 1906. Among her students at the college was A. E. Levett, who would go on to become vice-principal of St Hilda's College, Oxford.

Although Levett expected to be appointed as the principal after Henrietta Jex-Blake retired, this didn't happen, and she decided to leave Oxford. She asked for a teaching job in Westfield College, London. She was in fact appointed as principal of this college, in succession to Bertha Phillpotts, in 1921.

She was the first woman recipient of a D.Litt. by the University of Oxford, in 1928, which was awarded for her work in the field of modern history. She was honoured by a CBE in the 1932 Birthday Honours. She died aged 66 on 19 March 1936 in Windsor, Berkshire and was buried at Wolvercote Cemetery, near Oxford.

== Private life ==
Lodge was very close to Janet Spens who she met in 1911. They took lodged at the same address and then they hired a cottage from 1916 for nine years at Steeple Aston. They then bought a house together. Spens published "Eleanor Constance Lodge, Terms & Vacations" after she died in 1938.

== Published works ==
- The end of the Middle Age, 1273-1453. Six Ages of European History, from A.D. 476 to 1878. With introduction by R. Lodge. London: Methuen & Co. 1909.
- English constitutional documents, 1307-1485. Co-edited with Gladys A. Thornton. Cambridge: Cambridge University Press. 1935.
- The estates of the archbishop and chapter of Saint-André of Bordeaux under English rule. One hundred years of poor law administration in a Warwickshire village (Reprinted ed.). New York: Octagon Books. 1974 [1912]. ISBN 978-0-374-96161-9.
- Gascony under English rule. London: Methuen & Co. 1926.
- Life of the Black Prince, by Chandos Herald. Co-edited with Mildred Pope. Oxford: Clarendon Press. 1910.
- Sully, Colbert, and Turgot; a chapter in French economic history. London: Methuen & Co. 1931.
