= 1915–16 Sheffield United F.C. season =

Sheffield United
1915–16 season
- Chairman: Tom Bott
- Manager: None (John Nicholson acted as club secretary)
- Stadium: Bramall Lane
- Midland Section: 2nd
- Midland Division: 2nd
- Top goalscorer: League: Kitchen (13); All: Kitchen (13)
- Highest home attendance: 16,000 (vs The Wednesday)
- Lowest home attendance: 3,000 (vs Lincoln City)
Home colours

The 1915–16 season was the 27th season in existence for Sheffield United. Following the outbreak of World War I the English Football League and cup competitions were suspended, instead the team played in two regional competitions competing in the Midland section. With players away on active service or engaged in the war effort the first team squad was augmented by a series of guest players. These players were usually local born footballers who were home on leave from the army or had returned to the city to take up their former professions. Some were former Blades players whilst others would go on to sign for the club after the end of the war.

At this time the club did not employ a manager, with the team being selected by the Football Committee although the club secretary, John Nicholson, undertook many of the duties now associated with a team manager.

== Players ==
=== Squad ===
Note: Flags indicate national team as defined under FIFA eligibility rules; some limited exceptions apply. Players may hold more than one non-FIFA nationality.

| Pos. | Nation | Player |
|---|---|---|
| GK | ENG | Ernest Blackwell |
| DF | ENG | Bill Brelsford |
| DF | ENG | Bill Cook |
| DF | ENG | Jack English |
| MF | ENG | Robert Evans |
| FW | ENG | Stan Fazackerley |
| FW | IRL | Billy Gillespie |
| GK | ENG | Harold Gough |
| FW | ENG | Harry Hall |
| DF | ENG | Fred Hawley |

| Pos. | Nation | Player |
|---|---|---|
| GK | ENG | Ted Hufton |
| FW | ENG | Joe Kitchen |
| FW | ENG | Wally Masterman |
| MF | ENG | Harry Pantling |
| MF | ENG | Jimmy Revill |
| DF | ENG | Tom Richardson |
| MF | ENG | Jimmy Simmons |
| MF | ENG | Albert Sturgess |
| FW | ENG | Jack Thompson |
| MF | ENG | George Utley (captain) |

=== Wartime guest players ===
Note: Flags indicate national team as defined under FIFA eligibility rules; some limited exceptions apply. Players may hold more than one non-FIFA nationality.

| Pos. | Nation | Player |
|---|---|---|
| MF | ENG | Richard Allott |
| MF | ENG | Fred Brown |
| FW | ENG | Harold Buddery |
| FW | ENG | Fred Charles |
| MF | ENG | Bert Cook |
| DF | ENG | Ellis Hall |
| FW | ENG | Harry Johnson |
| MF | ENG | Harry Kay |

| Pos. | Nation | Player |
|---|---|---|
| FW | ENG | Dicky Leafe |
| GK | ENG | C.L. Needham |
| DF | ENG | John Poole |
| MF | ENG | Arthur Robins |
| FW | ENG | Ben Shearman |
| MF | ENG | Oliver Tummon |
| FW | ENG | J. Whiting |
| DF | ENG | Alf Wilson |

=== Transfers ===
==== Out ====
| Squad # | Position | Player | Transferred to | Fee | Date | Source |
|---|---|---|---|---|---|---|
| | FW | (Wales) David Davies | Released | | 31 May 1915 | |
| | FW | (England) Harry Hall | Released | | 30 September 1915 | |

=== Squad statistics ===
As of the end of the season

| No. | Pos | Nat | Player | Total | | Midland Section | | Midland Division | |
| No. | Pos | Nat | Player | Apps | Goals | Apps | Goals | Apps | Goals |
|---|---|---|---|---|---|---|---|---|---|
| | GK | (England) ENG | Ernest Blackwell | 2 | 0 | 2 | 0 | 0 | 0 |
| | DF | (England) ENG | Bill Brelsford | 29 | 0 | 21 | 0 | 8 | 0 |
| | DF | (England) ENG | Bill Cook | 10 | 0 | 7 | 0 | 3 | 0 |
| | DF | (England) ENG | Jack English | 4 | 0 | 3 | 0 | 1 | 0 |
| | MF | (England) ENG | Robert Evans | 0 | 0 | 0 | 0 | 0 | 0 |
| | FW | (England) ENG | Stan Fazackerley | 10 | 4 | 10 | 4 | 0 | 0 |
| | FW | (Ireland) EIR | Billy Gillespie | 30 | 10 | 20 | 5 | 10 | 5 |
| | GK | (England) ENG | Harold Gough | 22 | 0 | 12 | 0 | 10 | 0 |
| | DF | (England) ENG | Harry Hall | 1 | 0 | 1 | 0 | 0 | 0 |
| | DF | (England) ENG | Fred Hawley | 18 | 0 | 16 | 0 | 2 | 0 |
| | GK | (England) ENG | Ted Hufton | 11 | 0 | 11 | 0 | 0 | 0 |
| | FW | (England) ENG | Joe Kitchen | 13 | 13 | 13 | 13 | 0 | 0 |
| | FW | (England) ENG | Wally Masterman | 5 | 2 | 2 | 0 | 3 | 2 |
| | MF | (England) ENG | Harry Pantling | 26 | 0 | 17 | 0 | 9 | 0 |
| | MF | (England) ENG | Jimmy Revill | 3 | 0 | 3 | 0 | 0 | 0 |
| | DF | (England) ENG | Tom Richardson | 5 | 0 | 4 | 0 | 1 | 0 |
| | FW | (England) ENG | Jimmy Simmons | 26 | 10 | 19 | 8 | 7 | 2 |
| | MF | (England) ENG | Albert Sturgess | 34 | 1 | 24 | 1 | 10 | 0 |
| | MF | (England) ENG | Jack Thompson | 0 | 0 | 0 | 0 | 0 | 0 |
| | MF | (England) ENG | George Utley | 33 | 4 | 23 | 3 | 10 | 1 |
Guest players:
| | MF | (England) ENG | Richard Allott | 1 | 0 | 1 | 0 | 0 | 0 |
| | MF | (England) ENG | Fred Brown | 5 | 2 | 2 | 1 | 3 | 1 |
| | FW | (England) ENG | Harold Buddery | 15 | 5 | 10 | 3 | 5 | 2 |
| | FW | (England) ENG | Fred Charles | 4 | 1 | 3 | 1 | 1 | 0 |
| | MF | (England) ENG | Bert Cook | 2 | 0 | 1 | 0 | 1 | 0 |
| | DF | (England) ENG | Ellis Hall | 1 | 0 | 1 | 0 | 0 | 0 |
| | FW | (England) ENG | Harry Johnson | 2 | 0 | 0 | 0 | 2 | 0 |
| | MF | (England) ENG | Harry Kay | 11 | 7 | 4 | 4 | 7 | 3 |
| | FW | (England) ENG | Dicky Leafe | 3 | 0 | 3 | 0 | 0 | 0 |
| | GK | (England) ENG | C.L. Needham | 1 | 0 | 1 | 0 | 0 | 0 |
| | DF | (England) ENG | John Poole | 11 | 0 | 6 | 0 | 5 | 0 |
| | MF | (England) ENG | Arthur Robins | 3 | 0 | 3 | 0 | 0 | 0 |
| | FW | (England) ENG | Ben Shearman | 25 | 3 | 23 | 3 | 2 | 0 |
| | MF | (England) ENG | Oliver Tummon | 22 | 6 | 14 | 5 | 8 | 1 |
| | FW | (England) ENG | J. Whiting | 1 | 0 | 0 | 0 | 1 | 0 |
| | FW | (England) ENG | Alf Wilson | 7 | 0 | 7 | 0 | 0 | 0 |

== League tables ==
=== Midland Section ===
| Pos | Team | Pld | W | D | L | GF | GA | GD | Pts |
|---|---|---|---|---|---|---|---|---|---|
| 1 | Nottingham Forest | 26 | 15 | 5 | 6 | 48 | 25 | +23 | 35 |
| 2 | Sheffield United | 26 | 12 | 7 | 7 | 51 | 36 | +15 | 31 |
| 3 | Huddersfield Town | 26 | 12 | 5 | 9 | 43 | 36 | +7 | 29 |
| 4 | Bradford City | 26 | 12 | 4 | 10 | 52 | 32 | +20 | 28 |
| 5 | Barnsley | 26 | 12 | 4 | 10 | 46 | 55 | −9 | 28 |

=== Midland Division (subsidiary competition) ===
| Pos | Team | Pld | W | D | L | GF | GA | GD | Pts |
|---|---|---|---|---|---|---|---|---|---|
| 1 | Grimsby Town | 10 | 5 | 2 | 3 | 25 | 10 | +15 | 12 |
| 2 | Sheffield United | 10 | 4 | 3 | 3 | 17 | 11 | +6 | 11 |
| 3 | Rotherham County | 10 | 5 | 1 | 4 | 20 | 24 | −4 | 11 |
| 4 | Hull City | 10 | 5 | 0 | 5 | 18 | 27 | −9 | 10 |
| 5 | The Wednesday | 10 | 3 | 3 | 4 | 10 | 13 | −3 | 9 |
| 6 | Lincoln City | 10 | 2 | 3 | 5 | 17 | 22 | −5 | 7 |

== Matches ==
=== Midland Section ===
| 4 September 1915 | Lincoln City | 7–3 | Sheffield United | Sincil Bank |
| | | | Kitchen ?', ?', ?' | Attendance: 5,000 |

| 11 September 1915 | Sheffield United | 0–1 | Bradford City | Bramall Lane |
| | | | | Attendance: 8,500 |

| 18 September 1915 | Huddersfield Town | 2–2 | Sheffield United | Leeds Road |
| | | | Kitchen ?'; Fazakerley ?' | Attendance: 3,500 |

| 25 September 1915 | Sheffield United | 6–1 | Grimsby Town | Bramall Lane |
| | Kitchen ?', ?', ?'; Gillespie ?'; Utley ?'; Shearman ?' | | | Attendance: 7,000 |

| 2 October 1915 | Notts County | 3–0 | Sheffield United | Meadow Lane |
| | | | | Attendance: 3,000 |

| 9 October 1915 | Sheffield United | 2–0 | Derby County | Bramall Lane |
| | Kitchen ?'; Fazakerley ?' | | | Attendance: 5,500 |

| 16 October 1915 | The Wednesday | 0–0 | Sheffield United | Hillsborough |
| | | | | Attendance: 10,500 |

| 23 October 1915 | Sheffield United | 2–2 | Bradford Park Avenue | Bramall Lane |
| | Gillespie ?'; Tummon ?' | | | Attendance: 5,500 |

| 6 November 1915 | Sheffield United | 3–0 | Hull City | Bramall Lane |
| | Fazackerley ?', ?'; Kitchen ?' | | | Attendance: 5,000 |

| 13 November 1915 | Nottingham Forest | 2–0 | Sheffield United | City Ground |
| | | | | Attendance: 4,000 |

| 20 November 1915 | Sheffield United | 1–0 | Barnsley | Bramall Lane |
| | Tummon ?' | | | Attendance: 7,700 |

| 27 November 1915 | Leicester Fosse | 2–5 | Sheffield United | Filbert Street |
| | | | Gillespie ?', ?'; Kitchen ?', ?'; Shearman ?' | Attendance: 3,500 |

| 4 December 1915 | Sheffield United | 4–1 | Lincoln City | Bramall Lane |
| | Kitchen ?', ?'; Simmons ?' (pen.); Tummon ?' | | | Attendance: 3,000 |

| 11 December 1915 | Bradford City | 1–2 | Sheffield United | Valley Parade |
| | | | Simmons ?', ?' | Attendance: 450 |

| 18 December 1915 | Sheffield United | 5–1 | Lincoln City | Bramall Lane |
| | Simmons ?', ?', ?'; Utley ?'; Gillespie ?' | | | Attendance: 5,500 |

| 25 December 1915 | Grimsby Town | 2–1 | Sheffield United | Blundell Park |
| | | | Kay ?' | Attendance: 5,000 |

| 27 December 1915 | Leeds City | 2-3 | Sheffield United | Elland Road |
| | | | Kay ?', ?'; Charles ?' | Attendance: 5,000 |

| 1 January 1916 | Sheffield United | 1–1 | Notts County | Bramall Lane |
| | Kay ?' | | | Attendance: 7,500 |

| 8 January 1916 | Derby County | 2–1 | Sheffield United | Baseball Ground |
| | | | Kay ?' | Attendance: 3,000 |

| 15 January 1916 | Sheffield United | 1–1 | The Wednesday | Bramall Lane |
| | Tummon ?' | | | Attendance: 16,000 |

| 22 January 1916 | Bradford Park Avenue | 0–1 | Sheffield United | Park Avenue |
| | | | Brown ?' | Attendance: 3,000 |

| 29 January 1916 | Sheffield United | 4–1 | Leeds City | Bramall Lane |
| | Buddery ?', ?', ?'; Utley ?' (pen.) | | | Attendance: 8,000 |

| 5 February 1916 | Hull City | 2–1 | Sheffield United | Anlaby Road |
| | | | Brown ?' | Attendance: 4,000 |

| 12 February 1916 | Sheffield United | 3–1 | Nottingham Forest | Bramall Lane |
| | Tummon ?'; Shearman ?'; Simmons ?' | | | Attendance: 8,000 |

| 19 February 1916 | Barnsley | 0–0 | Sheffield United | Oakwell |
| | | | | Attendance: 4,756 |

| 25 April 1916 | Sheffield United | 1–1 | Leicester Fosse | Bramall Lane |
| | Wally Masterman ?' | | | Attendance: 7,000 |

=== Midland Division (subsidiary competition) ===
| 4 March 1916 | Hull City | 5–2 | Sheffield United | Anlaby Road |
| | | | Gillespie ?'; Tummon ?' | Attendance: 3,000 |

| 11 March 1916 | Sheffield United | 2–3 | Rotherham County | Bramall Lane |
| | Buddery ?'; Utley ?' | | | Attendance: 4,500 |

| 18 March 1916 | Sheffield United | 7–0 | Lincoln City | Bramall Lane |
| | Gillespie ?', ?'; Kay ?', ?'; Simmons ?', ?'; Brown ?' | | | Attendance: 4,000 |

| 25 March 1916 | Grimsby Town | 0–1 | Sheffield United | Blundell Park |
| | | | Gillespie ?' | Attendance: 2,000 |

| 1 April 1916 | Sheffield United | 1–1 | The Wednesday | Bramall Lane |
| | Simmons ?' | | | Attendance: 15,000 |

| 8 April 1916 | Sheffield United | 2–0 | Hull City | Bramall Lane |
| | Buddery ?'; Gillespie ?' | | | Attendance: 5,000 |

| 15 April 1916 | Rotherham County | 1–0 | Sheffield United | Millmoor |
| | | | | Attendance: 8,000 |

| 22 April 1916 | Lincoln City | 1–1 | Sheffield United | Sincil Bank |
| | | | Masterman ?' | Attendance: 3,500 |

| 24 April 1916 | The Wednesday | 0–1 | Sheffield United | Hillsborough Stadium |
| | | | Masterman ?' | Attendance: 14,500 |

| 29 April 1916 | Sheffield United | 0–0 | Grimsby Town | Bramall Lane |
| | | | | Attendance: 6,000 |

=== Friendlies ===
| 6 May 1916 | Sheffield United | 3–0 | The Wednesday | Bramall Lane |
| | Gillespie ?'; Whiting ?'; Tummon ?' | | | Attendance: 6,000 |
