= 1914–15 Sheffield United F.C. season =

Sheffield United
1914–15 season
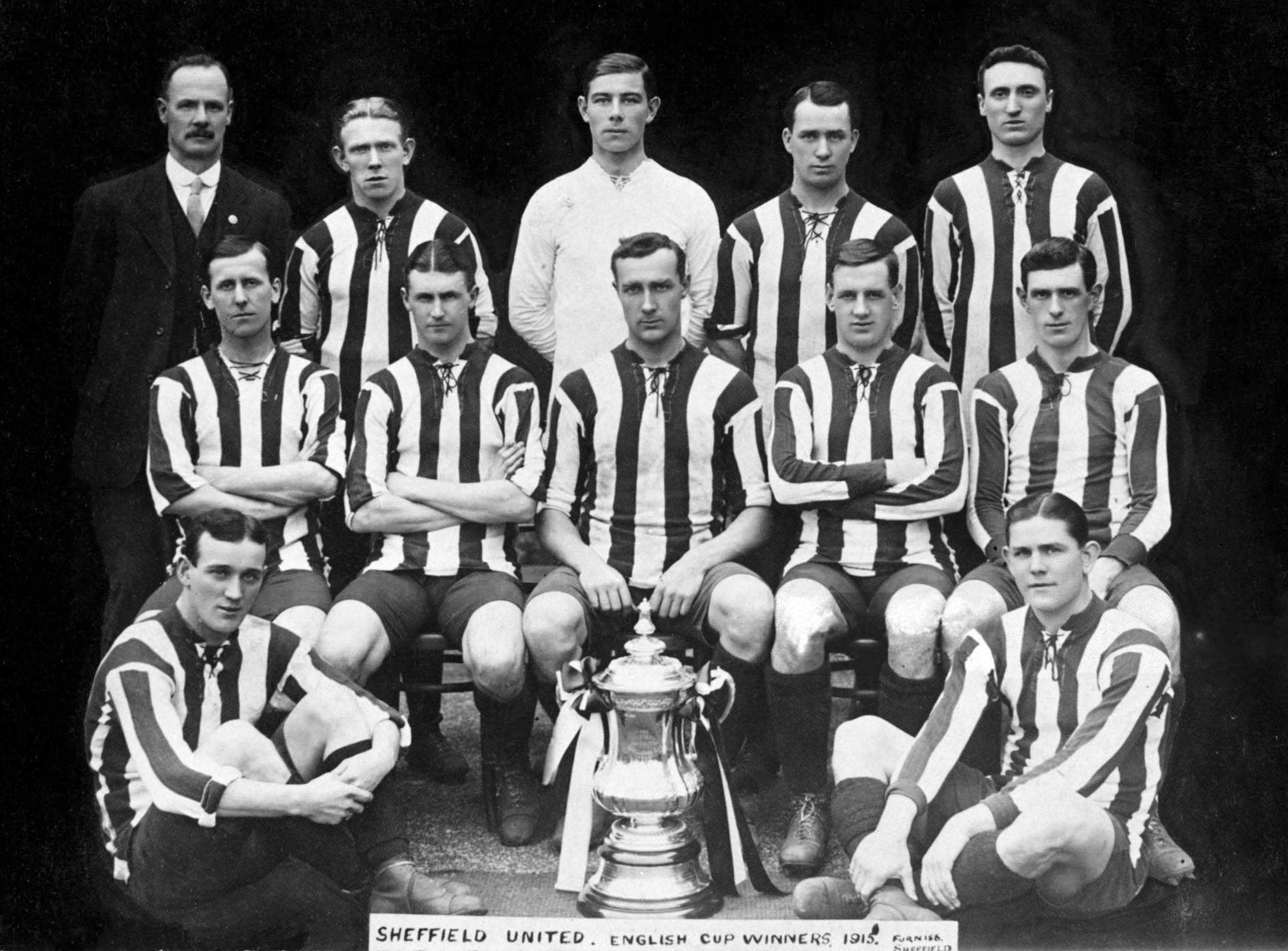
- The FA Cup winners
- Chairman: Tom Bott
- Manager: None (John Nicholson acted as club secretary)
- Stadium: Bramall Lane
- Division One: 6th
- FA Cup: Winners
- Top goalscorer: League: Kitchen (12); All: Kitchen (16)
- Highest home attendance: 32,000 (vs Blackburn Rovers)
- Lowest home attendance: 5,000 (vs Burnley)
- Average home league attendance: 14,947
Home colours

The 1914–15 season was the 26th season in existence for Sheffield United, during which they played in Division One. At this time the club did not employ a manager, with the team being selected by the Football Committee although the club secretary, John Nicholson, undertook many of the duties now associated with a team manager. The club continued to establish itself as one of the top sides in the country, finishing sixth in the First Division and beating Chelsea 3–0 in the final to become winners of the FA Cup.

== Season overview ==
After a solid end to the previous season there was an amount of optimism for what the club could achieve in the coming term. Reserve players Bob Barnshaw, Bert Pearson and Sam Bagnall were allowed to leave during the close season but it was thought that only a few good additions to the squad would turn the side into genuine contenders for the league title.

The football committee duly signed Harry Pantling and Jack Thompson but it was the signing of Wally Masterman for £800 from Gainsborough Trinity that proved their most astute purchase.

The season was played under the shadow of war from the European continent and attendances dwindled as the country moved onto a war footing. The team's pre-season optimism was dealt a massive blow in their first game when star player Billy Gillespie broke his leg and did not feature again that term. This loss unsettled the team and they made a miserable start, winning only three games up until the start of December.

The loss of Gillespie had an unforeseen effect however, as it allowed other players to come into their own. Joe Kitchen was the main goal threat but David Davies and particularly Masterman began to score regularly.

The change in fortune came in December from when the team embarked on an impressive run of form, losing only once more until the start of April. During this time the club also had another successful run in the FA Cup. Beaten semi-finalists the season before, this time round they reached the final at Old Trafford where they beat Chelsea 3–0 to lift the cup for the third time.

Unfortunately the hoped for challenge for the championship never really materialised. Ironically the team's success in the cup would begin to have a detrimental effect on their league form as the resulting fixture pile up meant that they were required to play nine competitive games during April 1915, including the FA Cup Final, and results suffered accordingly. This, coupled with their poor start, saw the side eventually finish sixth in the table in what turned out to be the final season before the league and cup competitions were abandoned whilst the country was at war.

== Players ==
=== Squad ===
Note: Flags indicate national team as defined under FIFA eligibility rules; some limited exceptions apply. Players may hold more than one non-FIFA nationality.

Pos.	Nation	Player
GK	ENG	Ernest Blackwell
DF	ENG	Bill Brelsford
DF	ENG	Bill Cook
FW	WAL	David Davies
DF	ENG	Jack English
MF	ENG	Robert Evans
FW	ENG	Stan Fazackerley
FW	IRL	Billy Gillespie
GK	ENG	Harold Gough
DF	ENG	Fred Hawley
FW	ENG	Harry Hall

Pos.	Nation	Player
GK	ENG	Ted Hufton
FW	ENG	Joe Kitchen
FW	ENG	Wally Masterman
MF	ENG	Harry Pantling
MF	ENG	Jimmy Revill
DF	ENG	Tom Richardson
MF	ENG	Jimmy Simmons
MF	ENG	Albert Sturgess
FW	ENG	Jack Thompson
MF	ENG	George Utley (captain)

=== Squad statistics ===
As of the end of the season

No.	Pos	Nat	Player	Total		Division One		FA Cup	
No.	Pos	Nat	Player	Apps	Goals	Apps	Goals	Apps	Goals
	GK	(England) ENG	Ernest Blackwell	0	0	0	0	0	0
	DF	(England) ENG	Bill Brelsford	37	0	31	0	6	0
	DF	(England) ENG	Bill Cook	44	0	37	0	7	0
	FW	(Wales) WAL	David Davies	25	7	22	7	3	0
	DF	(England) ENG	Jack English	34	0	28	0	6	0
	MF	(England) ENG	Robert Evans	38	1	32	1	6	0
	FW	(England) ENG	Stan Fazackerley	30	8	25	6	5	2
	FW	(Ireland) EIR	Billy Gillespie	1	0	1	0	0	0
	GK	(England) ENG	Harold Gough	43	0	37	0	6	0
	FW	(England) ENG	Harry Hall	0	0	0	0	0	0
	DF	(England) ENG	Fred Hawley	25	1	23	1	2	0
	GK	(England) ENG	Ted Hufton	2	0	1	0	1	0
	FW	(England) ENG	Joe Kitchen	36	16	29	12	7	4
	FW	(England) ENG	Wally Masterman	32	11	26	9	6	2
	MF	(England) ENG	Harry Pantling	6	0	6	0	0	0
	DF	(England) ENG	Tom Richardson	0	0	0	0	0	0
	MF	(England) ENG	Jimmy Revill	11	0	10	0	1	0
	FW	(England) ENG	Jimmy Simmons	44	11	37	9	7	2
	MF	(England) ENG	Albert Sturgess	43	1	36	1	7	0
	MF	(England) ENG	Jack Thompson	8	2	8	2	0	0
	MF	(England) ENG	George Utley	44	2	37	1	7	1

=== Transfers ===
==== In ====
Position	Player	Transferred from	Fee	Date	Source
FW	(England) Wally Masterman	(England) Gainsborough Trinity	£800	2 May 1914	
MF	(England) Harry Pantling	(England) Watford	£850	3 May 1914	
MF	(England) Jack Thompson	(England) Scunthorpe & Lindsey United	Free	8 July 1914	

==== Out ====
Position	Player	Transferred to	Fee	Date	Source
FW	(England) Bob Barnshaw	(England) Watford	£50	20 May 1914	
FW	(England) Sam Bagnall	(England) South Liverpool	Free	1 July 1914	
MF	(England) Bert Pearson	(England) Port Vale	Free	1 July 1914	

== League table ==
Pos	Team	Pld	W	D	L	GF	GA	GAv	Pts
4	Burnley	38	18	7	13	61	47	1.298	43
5	Manchester City	38	15	13	10	49	39	1.256	43
6	Sheffield United	38	15	13	10	49	41	1.195	43
7	The Wednesday	38	15	13	10	61	54	1.130	43
8	Sunderland	38	18	5	15	81	72	1.125	41

Source: World Football
Rules for classification: 1) Points; 2) Goal average; 3) Goals scored

== Matches ==
=== League ===
2 September 1914	Sunderland	3–2	Sheffield United	Roker Park
15:00			Simmons ( ) David Davies ( )	Attendance: 12,200

5 September 1914	Sheffield United	0–2	The Wednesday	Bramall Lane
15:00				Attendance: 27,500

12 September 1914	West Bromwich Albion	1–1	Sheffield United	The Hawthorns
15:00			Fazackerley ( )	Attendance: 6,481

19 September 1914	Sheffield United	1–0	Everton	Bramall Lane
15:00	David Davies ( )			Attendance: 18,000

26 September 1914	Chelsea	1–1	Sheffield United	Stamford Bridge
15:00			David Davies ( )	Attendance: 18,000

3 October 1914	Sheffield United	1–1	Bradford City	Bramall Lane
15:00	Fazackerley ( )			Attendance: 20,000

10 October 1914	Burnley	1–2	Sheffield United	Turf Moor
15:00			Fazackerley ( ) Kitchen ( )	Attendance: 18,000

17 October 1914	Sheffield United	1–1	Tottenham Hotspur	Bramall Lane
15:00	Thompson ( )			Attendance: 20,000

24 October 1914	Newcastle United	4–3	Sheffield United	St James' Park
15:00	Simmons ( ) Sturgess ( ) ( ) Thompson ( )			Attendance: 27,500

31 October 1914	Sheffield United	0–1	Middlesbrough	Bramall Lane
15:00				Attendance: 11,000

7 November 1914	Manchester City	0–0	Sheffield United	Hyde Road
15:00				Attendance: 25,500

14 November 1914	Aston Villa	1–0	Sheffield United	Villa Park
15:00				Attendance: 14,000

21 November 1914	Sheffield United	2–1	Liverpool	Bramall Lane
15:00	Simmons ( ), ( )			Attendance: 11,500

28 November 1914	Bradford Park Avenue	2–0	Sheffield United	Park Avenue
15:00				Attendance: 8,000

5 December 1914	Sheffield United	3–0	Oldham Athletic	Bramall Lane
15:00	Simmons ( ) Masterman ( ) David Davies ( )			Attendance: 8,500

12 December 1914	Manchester United	1–2	Sheffield United	Old Trafford
15:00			Simmons ( ) Masterman ( )	Attendance: 7,500

19 December 1914	Sheffield United	3–1	Bolton Wanderers	Bramall Lane
15:00	Simmons ( ) Kitchen ( ) Masterman ( )			Attendance: 5,500

26 December 1914	Sheffield United	1–2	Blackburn Rovers	Bramall Lane
15:00	Masterman ( )			Attendance: 32,000

28 December 1914	Sheffield United	1–0	Notts County	Bramall Lane
15:00	Simmons ( )			Attendance: 15,000

1 January 1915	Blackburn Rovers	1–2	Sheffield United	Ewood Park
15:00			Hawley ( ) Kitchen ( )	Attendance: 10,000

2 January 1915	The Wednesday	1–1	Sheffield United	Hillsborough Stadium
15:00			Davies ( )	Attendance: 31,500

16 January 1915	Sheffield United	2–0	West Bromwich Albion	Bramall Lane
15:00	David Davies ( ), ( )			Attendance: 14,500

23 January 1915	Everton	0–0	Sheffield United	Goodison Park
15:00				Attendance: 18,000

6 February 1915	Bradford City	1–1	Sheffield United	Valley Parade
15:00			Masterman ( )	Attendance: 18,000

13 February 1915	Sheffield United	1–0	Burnley	Bramall Lane
15:00	Kitchen ( )			Attendance: 5,000

27 February 1915	Sheffield United	1–0	Newcastle United	Bramall Lane
15:00	Kitchen ( )			Attendance: 17,500

8 March 1915	Sheffield United	1–0	Chelsea	Bramall Lane
15:00	Fazackerley ( )			Attendance: 5,750

17 March 1915	Middlesbrough	2–2	Sheffield United	Ayresome Park
15:00			Masterman ( ) Kitchen ( )	Attendance: 5,000

20 March 1915	Sheffield United	3–0	Aston Villa	Bramall Lane
15:00	Masterman ( ) Kitchen ( ), ( )			Attendance: 16,750

29 March 1915	Sheffield United	0–0	Manchester City	Bramall Lane
15:00				Attendance: 10,000

2 April 1915	Notts County	3–1	Sheffield United	Meadow Lane
15:00			Kitchen ( )	Attendance: 9,300

3 April 1915	Sheffield United	3–2	Bradford Park Avenue	Bramall Lane
15:00	Simmons ( ) Kitchen ( ) Masterman ( )			Attendance: 10,500

5 April 1915	Sheffield United	1–1	Sunderland	Bramall Lane
15:00	Fazackerley ( )			Attendance: 21,000

10 April 1915	Oldham Athletic	3–0	Sheffield United	Boundary Park
15:00				Attendance: 10,354

12 April 1915	Liverpool	2–1	Sheffield United	Anfield
15:00			Kitchen ( )	Attendance: 4,000

17 April 1915	Sheffield United	3–1	Manchester United	Bramall Lane
15:00	Utley ( ) Evans ( ) Masterman ( )			Attendance: 14,000

19 April 1915	Tottenham Hotspur	1–1	Sheffield United	White Hart Lane
15:00			Fazackerley ( )	Attendance: 7,750

26 April 1915	Bolton Wanderers	0–1	Sheffield United	Burnden Park
15:00			Kitchen ( )	Attendance: 13,500

=== FA Cup ===
23 January 1915 Round 1	Blackpool	1–2	Sheffield United	Bloomfield Road
15:00			Masterman (?), (?)	Attendance: 9,462

30 January 1915 Round 2	Sheffield United	1–0	Liverpool	Bramall Lane
15:00	Kitchen (?)			Attendance: 26,754

20 February 1915 Round 3	Sheffield United	1–0 (a.e.t.)	Bradford Park Avenue	Bramall Lane
15:00	Crozier (?)			Attendance: 30,032

6 March 1915 Round 4	Oldham Athletic	0–0 (a.e.t.)	Sheffield United	Boundary Park
15:00				Attendance: 18,419

13 March 1915 Round 4r	Sheffield United	3–0	Oldham Athletic	Bramall Lane
15:00	Kitchen (?); Fazackerley (?)			Attendance: 43,157

13 March 1915 Semi Final	Sheffield United	2–1	Bolton Wanderers	Ewood Park
15:00	Simmons (?); Utley (?)			Attendance: 22,404

24 April 1915 Final	Sheffield United	3–0	Chelsea	Old Trafford
15:00	Simmons (?); Fazackerley (?); Kitchen (?)			Attendance: 49,557

=== Friendlies ===
5 October 1914	The Wednesday	2–0	Sheffield United	Hillsborough Stadium
				Attendance: 5,500
