= List of Sheffield United F.C. international players =

Since Sheffield United F.C.'s formation in 1889, over 80 players have played at senior international level whilst registered with the club. United's first internationals were defenders Harry Lilley and Michael Whitham who both appeared for England on 5 March 1892 and the most recent player to be capped while with United was another defender, Lecsinel Jean-François who played twice for Haiti in November 2011.

== Key ==
- The following lists contain only players who gained international caps whilst a registered player of Sheffield United. Caps gained prior to joining and subsequent to leaving the club are not included.
- Table headings: Apps = Total number of appearances for the national side while a Sheffield United player; Goals = Total number of goals for the national side while a Sheffield United player; Years = Duration of time as a Sheffield United player; Ref = source of information
- Playing positions: GK = Goalkeeper; DF = Defender; MF = Midfielder; FW = Forward
- † Players with this colour and symbol in the "Name" column are currently signed to Sheffield United.

== Full internationals ==
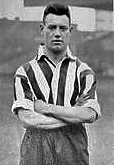
English international Bobby Barclay who made three appearances and scored two goals for England while with United in the 1930s.

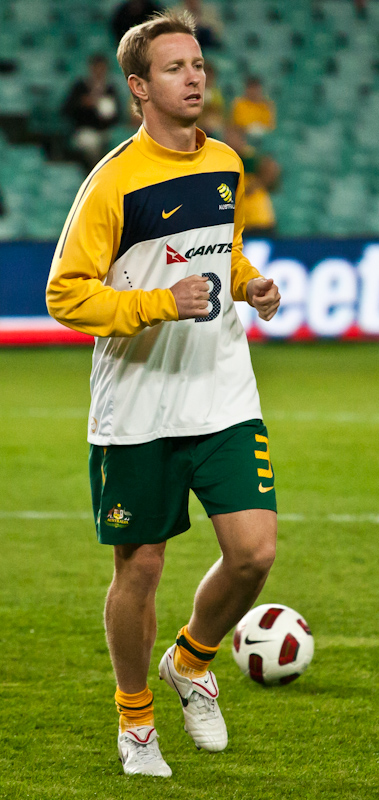
David Carney who made 13 appearances for Australia between 2007 and 2009.

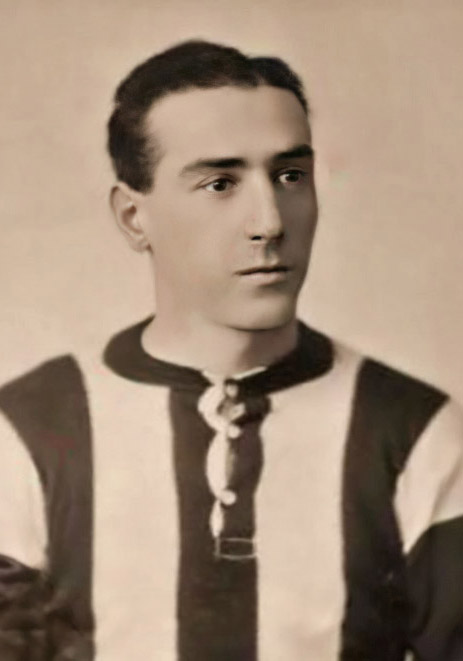
Billy Gillespie made 25 appearances for Northern Ireland, scoring 13 goals, while with United.

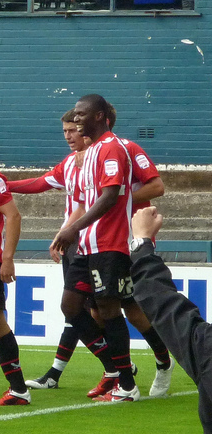
Defender Lecsinel Jean-François made two appearances for Haiti during his two-year spell with United.

United's first internationals were defenders Harry Lilley and Michael Whitham who both appeared for England on 5 March 1892, although they played against different opposition, as England played two first team games on the same day. Peter Ndlovu is the club's top international goalscorer, netting 21 times for Zimbabwe during his tenure with the Blades.

International call-ups during the earliest years of Sheffield United were generally for the home nations (England, Scotland, Wales and Northern Ireland.) From the 1990s onwards the increasingly multinational nature of the team resulted in call ups for players from across Europe (including Norway, Greece and Estonia) and also from the wider world (including China, Cameroon and Egypt.)

List of Sheffield United F.C. players making full international appearances
| Name | Position | National side | Apps | Goals | Years | Notes and refs. |
| Name | Position | National side | International stats | | Years | Notes and refs. |
|---|---|---|---|---|---|---|
| Mihkel Aksalu | GK | Estonia | 5 | 0 | 2010–2012 | |
| Len Allchurch | MF | Wales | 4 | 0 | 1961–1965 | |
| Bobby Barclay | MF | England | 3 | 2 | 1932–1937 | |
| Walter Bennett | FW | England | 2 | 0 | 1896–1905 | |
| Bob Benson | DF | England | 1 | 0 | 1905–1913 | |
| Nathan Blake | FW | Wales | 5 | 1 | 1994–1995 | |
| Daniel Bogdanović | FW | Malta | 7 | 0 | 2010–2011 | |
| Vasilios Borbokis | MF | Greece | 2 | 0 | 1997–1999 | |
| Peter Boyle | DF | Ireland | 5 | 0 | 1898–1904 | |
| Arthur Brown | FW | England | 2 | 1 | 1902–1908 | |
| Jim Brown | GK | Scotland | 1 | 0 | 1974–1978 | |
| David Brooks | MF | Wales | 3 | 0 | 2017-2018 | |
| David Carney | MF | Australia | 13 | 3 | 2007–2009 | |
| Eddie Colquhoun | DF | Scotland | 9 | 0 | 1968–1978 | |
| David Cotterill | MF | Wales | 4 | 0 | 2008–2010 | |
| Alf Common | FW | England | 2 | 2 | 1901–1904 | |
| Tony Currie | MF | England | 7 | 1 | 1968–1976 | |
| Joe Davies | FW | Wales | 3 | 0 | 1894–1895 | |
| Brian Deane (Note: Brian Deane had three separate spells with United. For simplicities sake only his first spell with the club, during which he was capped by England, is listed.) | FW | England | 3 | 0 | 1988–1993 | |
| Jimmy Dunne | FW | Ireland | 7 | 4 | 1928–1932 | |
| Jimmy Dunne | FW | Republic of Ireland | 1 | 2 | 1930 | |
| John Egan | DF | Republic of Ireland | 2 | 0 | 2018 | |
| Bob Evans (Note: Bob Evans made ten appearances for Wales between 1906 and 1910 qualifying through his parentage. Whilst with Sheffield United it was discovered that he had been born in Chester and therefore qualified to play for England. He subsequently changed his allegiance and made four appearances for the England team, something that was later outlawed by FIFA.) | MF | England | 4 | 1 | 1908–1918 | |
| Bob Evans | MF | Wales | 4 | 2 | 1908–1918 | |
| Ched Evans | FW | Wales | 3 | 0 | 2009–2012 | |
| Lee Evans | MF | Wales | 2 | 0 | 2018 | |
| Ahmed Fathy | MF | Egypt | 3 | 1 | 2007 | |
| Jostein Flo | FW | Norway | 23 | 5 | 1993–1995 | |
| Alex Forbes | MF | Scotland | 5 | 0 | 1894–1905 | |
| William Foulke | GK | England | 1 | 0 | 1894–1905 | |
| Kieron Freeman | DF | Wales | 1 | 0 | 2018 | |
| Billy Gillespie | FW | Northern Ireland | 25 | 13 | 1911–1931 | |
| Keith Gillespie | MF | Northern Ireland | 15 | 1 | 2005–2009 | |
| Harold Gough | GK | England | 1 | 0 | 1894–1905 | |
| Colin Grainger | MF | England | 6 | 3 | 1953–1957 | |
| George Green | DF | England | 8 | 0 | 1923–1934 | |
| Justin Haber | GK | Malta Malta | 9 | 0 | 2008–2010 | |
| Jimmy Hagan | FW | England | 1 | 0 | 1938–1957 | |
| Wally Hardinge | FW | England | 1 | 0 | 1907–1913 | |
| George Hedley | FW | England | 1 | 0 | 1898–1903 | |
| Colin Hill | MF | Northern Ireland | 6 | 1 | 1989–1992 | |
| Trevor Hockey | MF | Wales | 4 | 0 | 1971–1972 | |
| Glyn Hodges | MF | Wales | 5 | 0 | 1991–1996 | |
| Alan Hodgkinson | GK | England | 5 | 0 | 1954–1971 | |
| Rab Howell | DF | England | 1 | 1 | 1890–1998 | |
| Paul Ifill | MF | Barbados | 5 | 5 | 2005–2007 | |
| Lecsinel Jean-François | DF | Haiti | 2 | 0 | 2011–2013 | |
| Roy John | GK | Wales | 3 | 0 | 1934–1935 | |
| Harry Johnson | DF | England | 6 | 1 | 1895–1908 | |
| Mick Jones | FW | England | 2 | 0 | 1963–1967 | |
| Vinnie Jones | MF | Wales | 9 | 0 | 1990–1991 | |
| Petr Katchouro | FW | Belarus | 10 | 1 | 1996–2000 | |
| Colin Kazim-Richards | MF | Turkey | 1 | 0 | 2006–2007 | |
| Alan Kelly | GK | Republic of Ireland | 22 | 0 | 1992–1999 | |
| Paddy Kenny | GK | Republic of Ireland | 6 | 0 | 2002–2010 | |
| Li Tie | MF | China | 5 | 0 | 2006–2008 | |
| Harry Lilley | DF | England | 1 | 0 | 1890–1894 | |
| Bert Lipsham | MF | England | 1 | 0 | 1900–1908 | |
| Vince Matthews | DF | England | 2 | 1 | 1927–1931 | |
| David Mercer | MF | England | 2 | 1 | 1920–1928 | |
| Tommy Morren | DF | England | 1 | 1 | 1895–1903 | |
| Hugh Morris | MF | Wales | 1 | 2 | 1893–1895 | |
| Shaun Murphy | DF | Australia | 10 | 2 | 1999–2003 | |
| Gary Naysmith | DF | Scotland | 1 | 0 | 2007–2010 | |
| Peter Ndlovu | FW | Zimbabwe | 26 | 21 | 2001–2004 | |
| Ernest Needham | DF | England | 16 | 3 | 1891–1910 | |
| Roger Nilsen | DF | Norway | 15 | 0 | 1993–1999 | |
| Rob Page | DF | Wales | 13 | 0 | 2001–2004 | |
| Harry Pantling | DF | England | 1 | 0 | 1915–1926 | |
| Paul Peschisolido | FW | Canada | 4 | 0 | 2001–2004 | |
| Jack Pickering | FW | England | 1 | 0 | 1927–1948 | |
| David Powell | DF | Wales | 10 | 1 | 1968–1971 | |
| Fred Priest | DF | England | 1 | 0 | 1896–1905 | |
| Alan Quinn | MF | Republic of Ireland | 4 | 0 | 2004–2007 | |
| Gil Reece | MF | Wales | 16 | 1 | 1965–1972 | |
| Alf Ringstead | MF | Republic of Ireland | 20 | 7 | 1950–1959 | |
| Dean Saunders | FW | Wales | 5 | 0 | 1997–1998 | |
| Graham Shaw | DF | England | 5 | 0 | 1952–1967 | |
| Luton Shelton | FW | Jamaica | 9 | 7 | 2007–2008 | |
| Enda Stevens | DF | Republic of Ireland | 6 | 0 | 2018 | |
| Albert Sturgess | DF | England | 2 | 0 | 1908–1923 | |
| Patrick Suffo | FW | Cameroon | 14 | 2 | 2000–2002 | |
| Gareth Taylor | FW | Wales | 4 | 0 | 1996–1998 | |
| Olivier Tébily | DF | Ivory Coast | 1 | 0 | 1999 | |
| Harry Thickett | DF | England | 2 | 0 | 1891–1904 | |
| Fred Tunstall | MF | England | 7 | 0 | 1920–1932 | |
| Carl Veart | FW | Australia | 2 | 1 | 1994–1996 | |
| Conor Washington | FW | Northern Ireland | 1 | 0 | 2018 | |
| Michael Whitham | DF | England | 1 | 0 | 1890–1897 | |
| Bernard Wilkinson | DF | England | 1 | 0 | 1900–1913 | |

== Reserve internationals ==
"B" teams were devised in the 1940s as reserve squad for or a stepping stone to their relevant full national side.

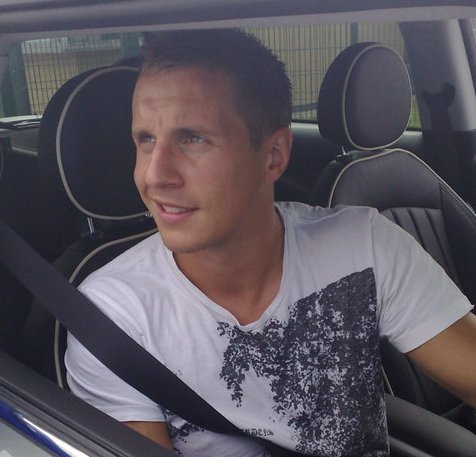
Phil Jagielka played once for the England B team during his time with the Blades.

List of Sheffield United F.C. players making 'B' international appearances
| Name | Position | National side | Apps | Goals | Years | Notes and Refs |
| Name | Position | National side | International stats | | Years | Notes and Refs |
|---|---|---|---|---|---|---|
| Chris Armstrong | DF | Scotland B | 1 | 0 | 2003–2008 | |
| Ted Burgin | GK | England B | 2 | 0 | 1949–1957 | |
| Brian Deane | FW | England B | 3 | 0 | 1988–1993 | |
| Jimmy Hagan | FW | England B | 1 | 0 | 1938–1958 | |
| Derek Hawksworth | FW | England B | 1 | 0 | 1950–1958 | |
| Glyn Hodges | MF | Wales B | 1 | 0 | 1991–1996 | |
| Phil Jagielka | DF | England B | 1 | 0 | 1999–2007 | |
| Nick Montgomery | MF | Scotland Futures | 1 | 0 | 2000–2012 | |
| Wayne Quinn | DF | England B | 1 | 0 | 1993–2001 | |
| Dennis Shiels | FW | Northern Ireland B | 2 | 0 | 1958–1964 | |
| Mick Speight | MF | England B | 4 | 1 | 1971–1980 | |

== Junior internationals ==
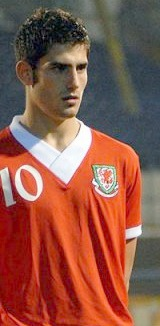
Striker Ched Evans scored four goals in four appearances for Wales Under-21s while with United.

List of Sheffield United F.C. players making Under-21 or Under-23 international appearances
| Name | Position | National side | Apps | Goals | Years | Notes and Refs |
| Name | Position | National side | International stats | | Years | Notes and Refs |
|---|---|---|---|---|---|---|
| Len Badger | DF | England Under-23 | 13 | 0 | 1962–1976 | |
| Peter Beagrie | FW | England Under-21 | 2 | 0 | 1986–1988 | |
| Alan Birchenall | FW | England Under-23 | 2 | 0 | 1964–1967 | |
| Jim Brown | GK | Scotland Under-23 | 2 | 0 | 1974–1978 | |
| Adam Chapman | MF | Northern Ireland Under-21 | 6 | 0 | 2007–2009 | |
| Tony Currie | FW | England Under-23 | 13 | 4 | 1968–1976 | |
| Martin Donnelly | MF | Northern Ireland Under-21 | 1 | 0 | 2005–2008 | |
| Ched Evans | FW | Wales Under-21 | 4 | 4 | 2009–2012 | |
| Alan Hodgkinson | GK | England Under-23 | 7 | 0 | 1954–1971 | |
| Phil Jagielka | DF | England Under-21 | 6 | 2 | 2000–2007 | |
| Mick Jones | FW | England Under-23 | 9 | 4 | 1963–1967 | |
| Harry Maguire | DF | England Under-21 | 1 | 0 | 2011–2014 | |
| Sean McGinty | DF | Republic of Ireland Under-21 | 7 | 0 | 2013–2014 | |
| Nick Montgomery | MF | Scotland Under-21 | 2 | 0 | 2000–2012 | |
| Kyle Naughton | DF | England Under-21 | 2 | 0 | 2008–2009 | |
| Owen Morrison | MF | Northern Ireland Under-21 | 3 | 0 | 2003 | |
| Stephen Quinn | MF | Republic of Ireland Under-21 | 9 | 1 | 2005–2012 | |
| Wayne Quinn | DF | England Under-21 | 2 | 0 | 1993–2001 | |
| Stefan Scougall† | FW | Scotland Under-21 | 1 | 0 | 2014– | |
| Bernard Shaw | DF | England Under-23 | 2 | 0 | 1963–1969 | |
| Graham Shaw | DF | England Under-23 | 5 | 0 | 1952–1967 | |
| Michael Tonge | MF | England Under-21 | 2 | 0 | 2001–2008 | |
| Curtis Woodhouse | MF | England Under-21 | 4 | 0 | 1997–2001 | |

== Amateur internationals ==
National sides comprising only amateur players were introduced at the start of the twentieth century, following the rise of professionalism which made it difficult for amateur players to find a place in the main national side. Despite being a professional club, Sheffield United occasionally contracted players on an amateur basis and those players who represented their country while under such terms are listed below.

List of Sheffield United F.C. players making amateur international appearances
| Name | Position | National side | Apps | Goals | Years | Notes and refs |
| Name | Position | National side | International stats | | Years | Notes and refs |
|---|---|---|---|---|---|---|
| John Roxburgh | FW | Scotland amateur | 1 | 0 | 1925–1926 | |
| Billy Russell | MF | England amateur | 4 | 0 | 1957–1963 | |

== Wartime internationals ==
=== World War I ===
With the outbreak of World War I in 1914, organised football continued until the end of the season in 1915. However, there were growing calls for organised sports to be suspended in favour of the war effort and The Football Association duly halted all competitive fixtures from 1915, a cessation which remained in place until the commencement of the 1919–20 season. Despite this a number of exhibition games did take place, mainly immediately following the cessation of the conflict.

List of Sheffield United F.C. players making appearances during World War I
| Name | Position | National side | Apps | Goals | Years | Notes and Refs |
| Name | Position | National side | International stats | | Years | Notes and Refs |
|---|---|---|---|---|---|---|
| Jack English | DF | England | 1 | 0 | 1913–1916 | |
| Harold Gough | GK | England | 1 | 0 | 1913–1924 | |

=== World War II ===
With the outbreak of war in 1939 the government immediately imposed a ban on the assembly of crowds and as such, organised football was halted for the duration of the war. Despite this a series of unofficial exhibition games were organised throughout the wartime period, with the details of Sheffield United's involvement listed below.

List of Sheffield United F.C. players making appearances during World War II
| Name | Position | National side | Apps | Goals | Years | Notes and Refs |
| Name | Position | National side | International stats | | Years | Notes and Refs |
|---|---|---|---|---|---|---|
| Jimmy Hagan | FW | England | 16 | 13 | 1938–1957 | |

== The Football League representative teams ==
Between 1891 and 1976 The Football League arranged representative games against similarly selected teams from the Scottish Football League, the League of Ireland, the Irish League, the Southern League and occasionally against club sides. 26 Sheffield United players made appearances in these fixtures and those are listed below.

List of Sheffield United F.C. players representing the Football League
| Name | Position | Apps | Goals | Years | Notes and Refs |
| Name | Position | International stats | | Years | Notes and Refs |
|---|---|---|---|---|---|
| Len Badger | DF | 3 | 0 | 1962–1976 | |
| Bob Benson | DF | 1 | 1 | 1905–1913 | |
| Tony Currie | FW | 3 | 2 | 1968–1976 | |
| Jack English | DF | 1 | 0 | 1913–1916 | |
| Stan Fazackerley | FW | 1 | 0 | 1913–1920 | |
| William Foulke | GK | 2 | 0 | 1894–1905 | |
| Colin Grainger | FW | 3 | 1 | 1953–1957 | |
| George Green | DF | 3 | 0 | 1923–1934 | |
| Jimmy Hagan | FW | 3 | 2 | 1938–1957 | |
| Harry Hammond | FW | 1 | 0 | 1891–1897 | |
| George Hedley | FW | 1 | 1 | 1898–1903 | |
| Alan Hodgkinson | GK | 1 | 0 | 1954–1971 | |
| Jim Iley | DF | 1 | 0 | 1954–1957 | |
| Harry Johnson Jnr. | FW | 1 | 3 | 1916–1931 | |
| Harry Johnson Snr. | DF | 1 | 0 | 1895–1908 | |
| Joe Lievesley | GK | 1 | 0 | 1904–1912 | |
| Bert Lipsham | MF | 2 | 0 | 1900–1908 | |
| David Mercer | FW | 1 | 0 | 1920–1928 | |
| Tommy Morren | DF | 2 | 0 | 1895–1903 | |
| Ernest Needham | DF | 10 | 1 | 1891–1910 | |
| Jack Pickering | FW | 1 | 0 | 1927–1948 | |
| Graham Shaw | DF | 4 | 0 | 1952–1967 | |
| Joe Shaw | DF | 2 | 0 | 1945–1966 | |
| Harry Thickett | DF | 2 | 0 | 1893–1904 | |
| Fred Tunstall | FW | 4 | 1 | 1920–1932 | |
| Alan Woodward | FW | 2 | 0 | 1964–1978 | |

== FA overseas tours ==
Between 1899 and 1978 the four football associations of the UK undertook occasional summer tours, playing friendly fixtures against their host nations. Although the representative sides were often almost a full international team, these games were not considered full internationals. A number of United players were members of the touring parties on four of those tours between 1910 and 1951, with those players being listed below.

=== 1910 South Africa ===
- Bob Benson
- Joe Lievesley
- Albert Sturgess

=== 1920 South Africa ===
- Stan Fazackerley
- David Mercer

=== 1950 Canada ===
- Jimmy Hagan

=== 1951 Australia ===
- Ted Burgin
- Jimmy Hagan
- Joe Shaw
