= Tummon =

Tummon is a surname. Notable people with the surname include:

- Oliver Tummon (1884–1955), English footballer
- William Ernest Tummon (1879–1960), Canadian politician
