= Fred Charles =

Fred Charles may refer to:

- Fred Charles (footballer) (fl. early 20th century), English footballer
- Fred Charles, British anarchist; one of the Walsall Anarchists in 1892
