= James Molyneux =

James or Jim Molyneux or Molyneaux may refer to:

- Jim Molyneux, English footballer
- James Molyneaux, Baron Molyneaux of Killead (1920–2015), MP and Ulster Unionist Party leader
- James Molyneux Caulfeild (1820–1892), Irish MP and later 3rd Earl of Charlemont
- James More Molyneux (died 1776), British politician
