= 1915 FA Cup final =

1915 FA Cup Final
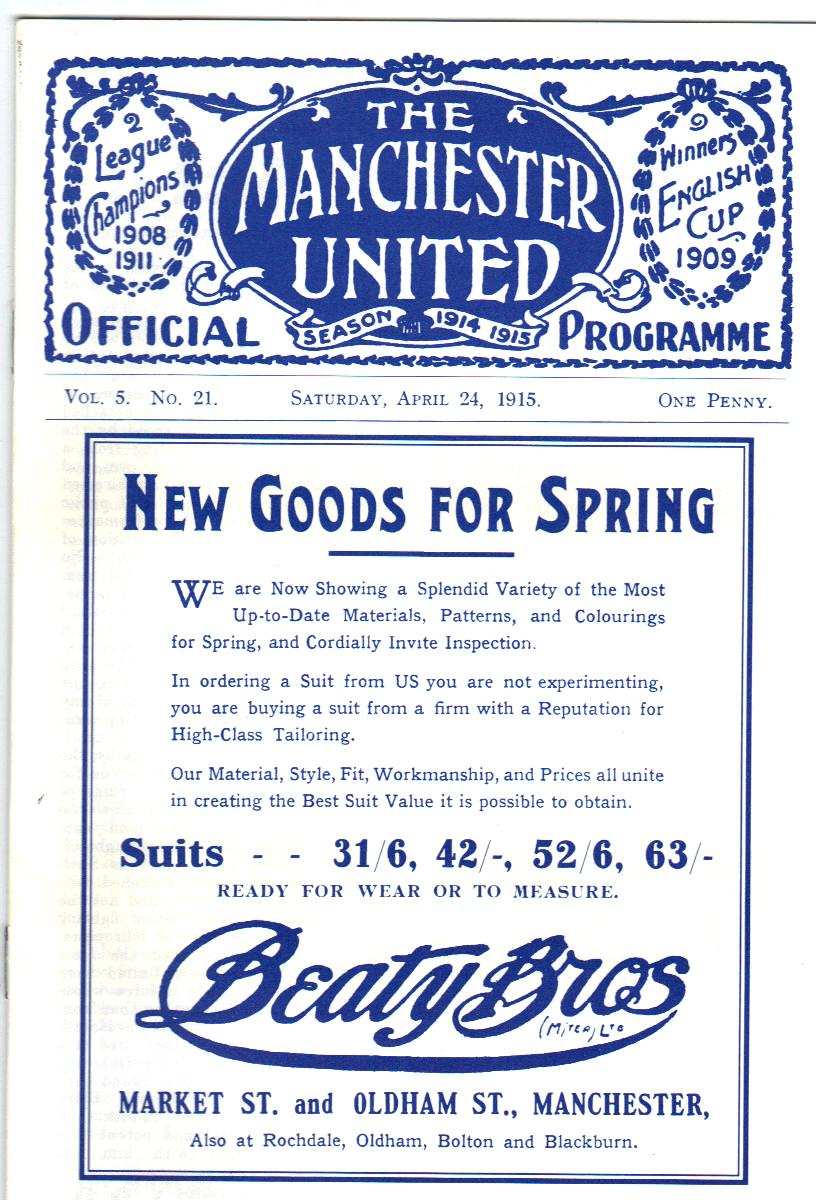
- Match programme
- Event: 1914–15 FA Cup
Sheffield United	Chelsea
3	0
- Date: 24 April 1915
- Venue: Old Trafford, Manchester
- Referee: H. H. Taylor
- Attendance: 49,557

The 1915 FA Cup final took place on 24 April 1915 and was contested by Sheffield United and Chelsea. It was the last FA Cup final to be staged after the implementation of the Defence of the Realm Act 1914 which suspended competitive football in Britain for the duration of the First World War. The match was moved from its pre-war location of Crystal Palace in south London to Old Trafford in Manchester to avoid disruption to travel in and around London.

The match is one of the few FA Cup finals that has acquired a nickname; the "Khaki Cup Final", owing to the large number of uniformed soldiers in attendance. However, the attendance of about 50,000 was lower than previous years as a result of wartime travel restriction and the mobilisation of large numbers of young men into the armed forces.

== Road to the Final ==
Chelsea had the easiest start in the FA Cup competition, their first round match was with Swindon Town, a Southern Football League team, but they made heavy work of it requiring a replay to defeat them and conceding three goals during the two matches. Their Cup performance improved considerably, and after defeating Arsenal (then a Second Division side) in the second round, they defeated several First Division sides who finished above them in the league table, including Everton, who later went on to win the league that season.

Sheffield United defeated Blackpool, a Second Division side, in the first round and then made steady progress until the fourth round, where they met Oldham Athletic, who finished above them in the First Division that season, and they required a replay to finally defeat them. Sheffield United met Bolton Wanderers in the semi-final and George Utley, the Blades' captain, scored a rare goal.

=== Sheffield United ===
Home teams listed first.

Round 1: Blackpool 1–2 Sheffield United

Masterman 2

Round 2: Sheffield United 1–0 Liverpool

Kitchen

Round 3: Sheffield United 1–0 Bradford

Kitchen during extra time

Round 4: Oldham Athletic 0–0 Sheffield United

after extra time

Replay: Sheffield United 3–0 Oldham Athletic

Kitchen 2, Fazackerly

Semi-final: Bolton Wanderers 1–2 Sheffield United

Simmons, Utley
(at Ewood Park)

=== Chelsea ===
Home teams listed first.

Round 1: Chelsea 1–1 Swindon Town

Thomson

Replay: Chelsea 5–2 Swindon Town

Thomson 2, Ford 2 McNeil

Round 2: Chelsea 1–0 Arsenal

Halse

Round 3: Manchester City 0–1 Chelsea

Thomson

Round 4: Chelsea 1–1 Newcastle

Thomson

Replay: Newcastle 0–1 Chelsea

Ford

Semi-final: Everton 0–2 Chelsea

Croal, Halse
(at Villa Park)

== Pre-match build-up ==
The favourites to win the match were Sheffield United. They had combined a successful FA Cup run with a strong league campaign where they finished 6th, but only three points behind the League winners. Their defence was one of the best in the league, but they had not managed to score many goals.

Chelsea were statistically the weaker side; whilst they had scored more goals than Sheffield United in the league, their defence was poor and they had conceded many more and lay in the relegation zone. They had however beaten several strong clubs away from home during the FA Cup competition and the programme noted that the underdogs had won on six occasions in the previous ten years.

Chelsea also had injury problems: Bob Thomson, their leading goal scorer that season, had been injured in a league game at Bolton Wanderers ten days earlier and was doubtful. Vivian Woodward, an amateur and England international who played for Chelsea in peacetime but was at the time serving in the British Army, had been given leave to play in the final. However, Thomason recovered enough so Woodward sportingly insisted that as Thomson had helped the club reach the final without Woodward himself playing, he ought to play in it. There was bad news when Thomson suffered an eye injury, but he played.

== Match programme ==
The official match programme was produced by Manchester United. A special version was printed on silk for presentation to the players and officials.

The programme showed that both teams played a 2–3–5 formation and the Chelsea team sheet listed Vivian Woodward and Laurence Abrams in addition to those who played in the match. Neither played in the match.

== Match summary ==
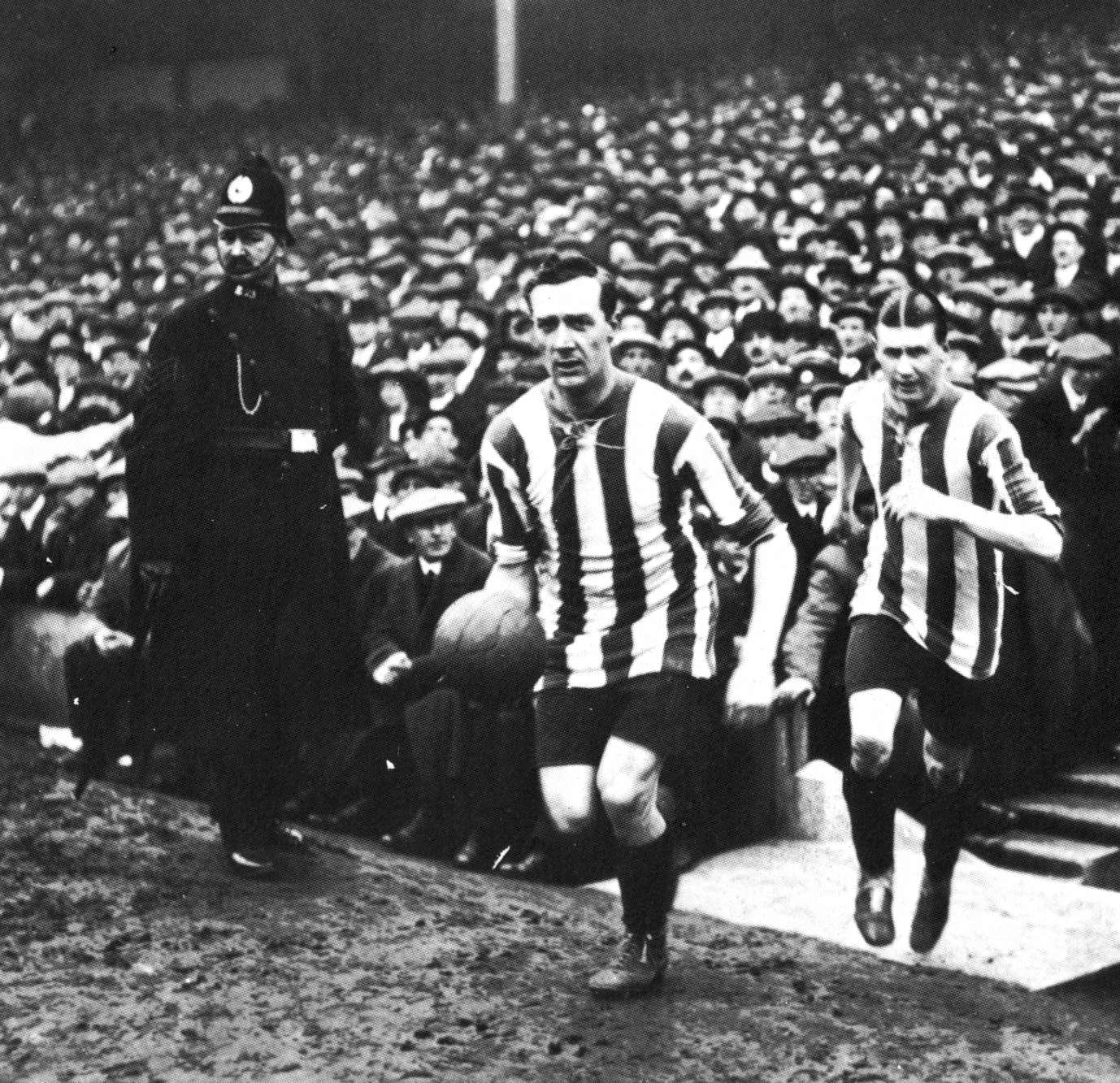
Captain George Utley leads Sheffield United out for the 1915 FA Cup final

As the scoreline suggests, the match was a one-sided affair. Chelsea adopted a gentlemanly "Drawing Room" style of play with attacks made up of zigzag passes. These were broken up by an alert and cooperative Sheffield United defence. The Sheffield United forwards, with their superior tactics, pace and fitness, had the run of the Chelsea half and only the excellent performance of Chelsea goalkeeper Molyneux saved them from further embarrassment. Contemporary reports singled out Brelsford, Simmons and Utley of Sheffield United for their quality of their performances during the match, and Logan, who made some unsuccessful attacks for Chelsea during the second half.

The first goal was scored by Simmons just before half-time. A ball in from the left-hand side crossed over the Chelsea backs and Simmons, racing in from the right half, half-volleyed it into the top of the net. Some sources suggest that Molyneux should have stopped this goal but others state that he was let down by his defence for all three goals. Chelsea had their best chances just before half-time when they had two shots saved by Gough in the Blades' goal.

At some point Chelsea woes were added to when Harry Ford on the right wing was injured.

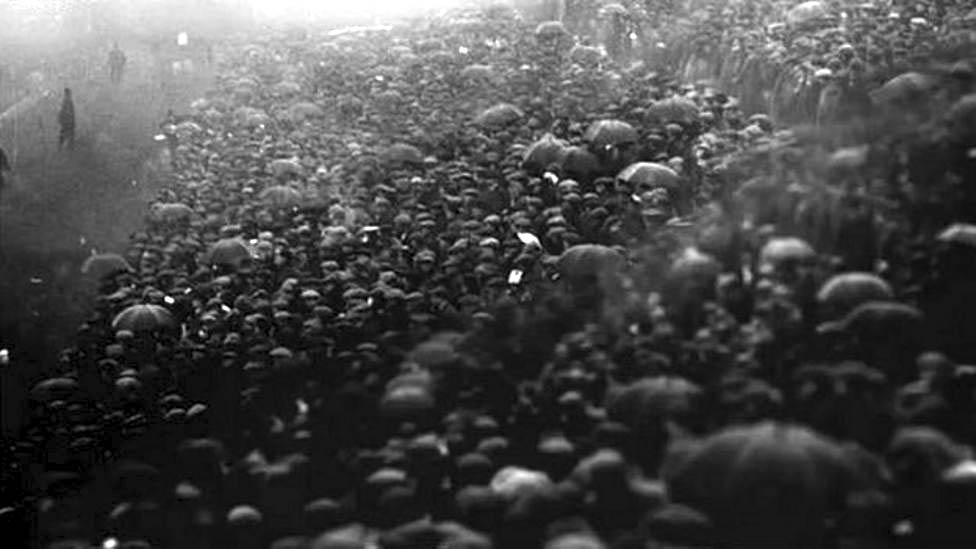
A crowd of 50,000 attended the match

Play was muted at the start of the second half as a thick fog descended over the pitch, preventing spectators from seeing any action on the opposite side of the pitch, though The Times commented that they were "not missing much". The final two goals were scored in the last ten minutes. A shot from Wally Masterman rebounded from the bar but Fazackerly headed it past the Chelsea keeper for United's second. Directly after this goal Joe Kitchen picked the ball up just inside the Chelsea half and passed two defenders. Molyneaux emerged from the Chelsea goal but Kitchen dodged him and placed the ball in the open net. At this point, before the final whistle, large numbers of the spectators began to leave.

The crowd included many servicemen in uniform but a much larger contingent who, the Manchester Guardian commented, should have been in uniform. A number of wounded soldiers, one missing an arm, watched the match from lower stand.

The cup was awarded by the Earl of Derby whose speech, largely drowned out by a noisy crowd of young supporters, noted that all present needed to join together and play "a sterner game for England".

The Irwell Old Prize band provided the half time entertainment, playing a selection of tunes from around the British Isles. A collection was made during the match on behalf of the British Red Cross.

== Match details ==
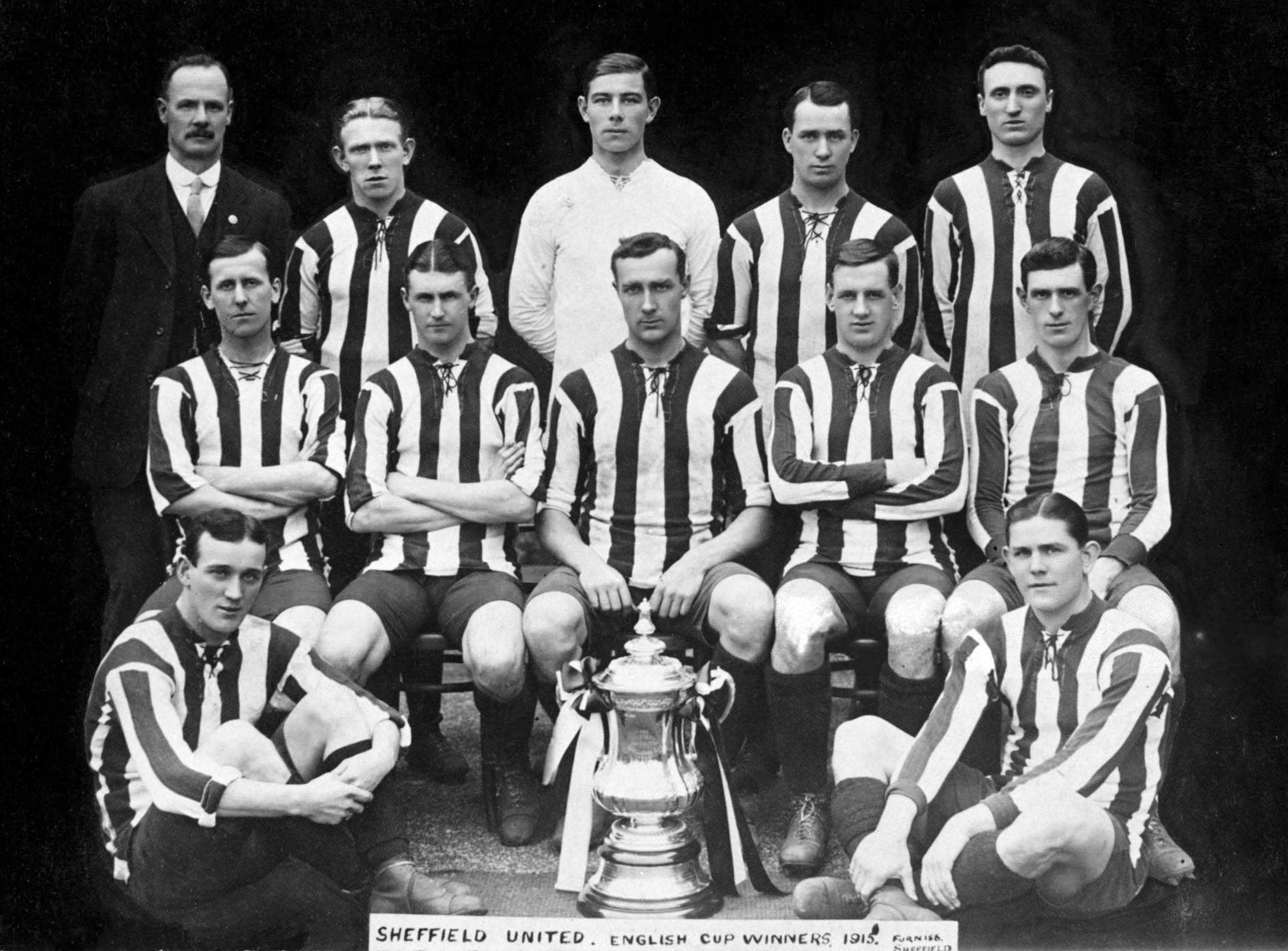
Sheffield United, winning side

24 April 1915
15:00 BST

Sheffield United	3–0	Chelsea
Simmons 36'; Fazackerley 84'; Kitchen 88'

Old Trafford, Manchester
Attendance: 49,557
Referee: H. H. Taylor

Sheffield United	Chelsea

GK	(England) Harold Gough
FB	(England) Billy Cook
FB	(England) Jack English
HB	(England) Albert Sturgess
CH	(England) Bill Brelsford
HB	(England) George Utley (c)
OF	(England) Jimmy Simmons
IF	(England) Stanley Fazackerley
CF	(England) Joseph Kitchen
IF	(England) Wally Masterman
OF	(England) Bob Evans
Manager:
(England) John Nicholson

GK	(England) Jim Molyneux
FB	(England) Walter Bettridge
FB	(England) Jack Harrow
HB	(England) Fred Taylor (c)
CH	(Scotland) Tommy Logan
HB	(Scotland) Andy Walker
OF	(England) Harry Ford
IF	(England) Harold Halse
CF	(England) Bob Thomson
IF	(Scotland) Jimmy Croal
OF	(Scotland) Bob McNeil
Manager:
(Scotland) David Calderhead

Match rules
- 90 minutes.
- 30 minutes of extra-time if necessary.
- Replay if scores still level.
- No substitutes

== Aftermath ==
In July 1915, the Football League placed all players on amateur status and clubs were only allowed to pay expenses. Attendances at matches collapsed and as fuel for transport became scarce the national league was abandoned and football teams played in regional leagues with whatever players they could find. Chelsea often played with players from other sides who passed through London whilst on active service, including Stanley Fazackerley.

Sheffield United held the FA Cup until it was contested again in 1920. They reached the final and won the cup again in 1925.

Chelsea did not reach the final again until 1967 and, 55 years later, finally won it in 1970 at Old Trafford in a replay.
