= George Brown (footballer, born 1880) =

English footballer

Gee Gee Brown
Personal information
- Full name: George Gravar Brown
- Date of birth: 17 January 1880
- Place of birth: Kirkley, Suffolk, England
- Position: Outside left

Senior career*
Years	Team	Apps	(Gls)
- Kirkley
- Dulwich Hamlet
1903–1904	Woolwich Arsenal	0	(0)
1904–1905	Stoke	8	(0)
1905–1906	Norwich City	19	(1)
1906–1907	Millwall Athletic	25	(1)
1907–1908	Gainsborough Trinity	18	(0)
1908–1909	Sheffield United	2	(0)
- * Club domestic league appearances and goals

George "Gee Gee" Gravar Brown (born 17 January 1880) was a footballer who played in the Football League. Born in Kirkley in Suffolk, England he started his career with his home town club Kirkley before spells at Dulwich Hamlet and Woolwich Arsenal. He joined Stoke City in 1903 where he turned professional, before moving to Norwich City, Millwall Athletic, Gainsborough Trinity and finally Sheffield United.

== Playing career ==
Brown began his football career as an amateur with his home town club of Kirkley some time around the end of the Nineteenth Century before moving to London to join another amateur side Dulwich Hamlet. In 1903 he joined Woolwich Arsenal but failed to make an appearance before moving north to sign for Stoke a year later.

Brown made his Football League debut whilst at Stoke, in a home fixture against Derby County on 1 September 1904. He made eight league appearances in total whilst at Stoke before moving to Norwich City in 1905. Having made nineteen league appearances for Norwich, scoring one goal, he returned to London to sign for Millwall Athletic in 1906. Having made 25 league appearances for Millwall, Brown returned north the following season to sign for Lincolnshire side Gainsborough Trinity.

After making 18 league appearances for Trinity, Brown was transferred to Sheffield United as a make-weight in the deal that took fellow Trinity player Joe Kitchen to Bramall Lane in March 1908, the pair moving for a combined fee of £600. Brown's United career got off to a poor start as he was late arriving for his debut game, an away fixture at Sunderland, having missed his rail connection at York and had to take to the field two minutes into the game. Signed on the basis of being a "fast and tricky" winger, he failed to impress, with the local media claiming that he 'held onto the ball too long', and he made only one more league appearance for the Blades before being released at the end of the 1908–09 season.

== Personal life ==
After his football career finished it was reported in 1925 that Brown was the caretaker of the British Seaman's Institute in Tarragona in Spain. He returned to England before the outbreak of the Spanish Civil War and later took up positions as clerk of works at various airfields that were being built.

== Career statistics ==
Club	Season	League			FA Cup		Total	
Club	Season	Division	Apps	Goals	Apps	Goals	Apps	Goals
Woolwich Arsenal	1903–04	Second Division	0	0	0	0	0	0
Stoke	1904–05	First Division	8	0	0	0	8	0
Norwich City	1905–06	Southern League	19	1	0	0	19	1
Millwall Athletic	1906–07	Southern League	25	1	0	0	25	1
Gainsborough Trinity	1907–08	Second Division	18	0	1	0	19	0
Sheffield United	1908–09	First Division	2	0	0	0	2	0
Career Total			72	2	1	0	73	2
