= Jim Molyneux =

English footballer (1895–1950)

Personal information
- Full name: James Molyneux
- Date of birth: 1895
- Place of birth: Port Sunlight, England
- Date of death: 1950 (aged 54–55)
- Height: 5 ft 9 in (1.75 m)
- Position: Goalkeeper

Senior career*
Years	Team	Apps	(Gls)
–1910	Stockport County	?	(?)
1910–1923	Chelsea	210	(0)
- * Club domestic league appearances and goals

Jim Molyneux (born in Port Sunlight) was an English footballer who played for Stockport County and Chelsea. He was a capable goalkeeper and popular with the Stamford Bridge crowd. Though not prone to theatrical displays like some keepers he did take risks.

== Club career ==
Jim Molyneux started playing with Stockport County. In 1910 he transferred to David Calderhead's Chelsea where he became a first team regular. He was a member of the Chelsea side that reached the FA Cup in 1915. The Manchester Guardian singled out his performance in the match for praise and felt that he had been let down by his defence in all three goals that Chelsea conceded though others suggest the first goal was as a result of an error on his part. He would go on to make 239 appearances for Chelsea, keeping 77 clean sheets, before finally leaving in 1923.

== Honours ==
Chelsea

- FA Cup runner-up: 1914–15
