= Ernest Blackwell =

English footballer

Personal information
- Date of birth: 19 July 1894
- Place of birth: Sheffield, England
- Date of death: 16 October 1964 (aged 70)
- Place of death: Sheffield, England
- Height: 5 ft 9 in (1.75 m)
- Position: Goalkeeper

Senior career*
Years	Team	Apps	(Gls)
- Atlas & Norfolk Works
1913–1914	Scunthorpe & Lindsey United		
1914–1924	Sheffield United	47	(0)
- * Club domestic league appearances and goals

Ernest Blackwell (19 July 1894 – 16 October 1964) was a footballer who played as a goalkeeper, spending the majority of his career at his hometown club of Sheffield United. Born in Sheffield he was the cousin of England keeper Sam Hardy and brother of Aberdeen keeper Harry Blackwell.

== Career ==
Blackwell made his name at Scunthorpe & Lindsey United before being signed by Sheffield United in May 1914. He was seen as understudy to Harold Gough and Ted Hufton and as such his appearances were limited throughout his time at Bramall Lane. Having spent some time in the navy as a fitness instructor, he remained at the club for the duration of World War I, making sporadic appearances for the Blades and guesting for Leicester Fosse, Crystal Palace and cross town rivals Sheffield Wednesday.

After the war, Blackwell seemed happy with his role at the club, making only infrequent appearances, the highlight of his career coming when he played in the 1923 FA Cup semi-final. Injuries began to take their toll and after a bout of appendicitis he was advised that a blow to the abdomen could have terminal results and he was forced to retire. In recognition of his service, United presented him with a grant of £500 to commence a new business venture, a hire purchase warehouse unit in the Spital Hill area of Sheffield as well as becoming the landlord of several semi-detached houses in the Norton area of Sheffield.

== Personal life ==
Blackwell was a committed Methodist and a practising lay-preacher meaning he would sometimes miss fixtures played on religious dates. He died, aged 70, in his home town of Sheffield.
