= Albert Sturgess =

English footballer (1882–1957)

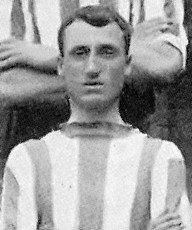

Personal information
- Full name: Albert Sturgess
- Date of birth: 21 October 1882
- Place of birth: Etruria, England
- Date of death: 16 July 1957 (aged 74)
- Place of death: Sheffield, England
- Height: 5 ft 11 1/2 in (1.82 m)
- Position: Wing half

Youth career
- Tunstall Cresswells

Senior career*
Years	Team	Apps	(Gls)
1902–1907	Stoke	124	(3)
1908–1922	Sheffield United	353	(5)
1923–1925	Norwich City	47	(0)
Total		524	(8)

International career
1911–1914	England	2	(0)
- * Club domestic league appearances and goals

Albert Sturgess (21 October 1882 – 16 July 1957) was an English footballer who played in the Football League for Norwich City, Sheffield United and Stoke, and the England national team.

== Early and personal life ==
Albert Sturgess was born on 21 October 1882 in Basford Hollow, Etruria, Staffordshire. The eldest of five children to Thomas and Martha Jane, his father was a potter's printer. He worked in the pottery industry and joined the North Staffordshire Regiment in April 1891. He married Amelia Harrison in 1902 and went on to have three children: Albert, Cyril Richmond and Amelia Lily. After retiring from football, he worked as a steel roller and later opened a china shop in Ecclesall Road, Sheffield. He died on 16 July 1957, aged 74.

== Club career ==
Sturgess started his career with amateur side Tunstall Cresswells before joining Stoke in 1902. He broke into the first team in 1905–06 thanks to the departure of James Bradley to Liverpool. Stoke, who had survived several relegation battles in the early 1900s, were relegated in 1906–07 and financial difficulties led to the club falling out of the Football League in 1907–08. To raise funds, Sturgess was sold to Sheffield United in 1908.

Arriving at Sheffield United alongside George Gallimore, for the maximum transfer fee at the time of £350, Sturgess played primarily at wing-half or half-back, forging a formidable partnership with George Utley and Bill Brelsford. He made his début for the Blades in a Division One match at Bury on 1 September 1908, replacing Ernest Needham at left-half.

Part of the victorious Sheffield United FA Cup winning team of 1915, when United beat Chelsea 3–1 at Old Trafford, on 24 April 1915, he went on to make 353 league appearances for the Blades, scoring five goals, between 1908 and 1922.

After the First World War, he played mainly as a full-back but was utilised in most positions in the team. In 1923, he joined Norwich City where he made 47 appearances, helping them to what was then their best-ever league finish, 11th in Division Three South. He retired from football in 1925, aged 42.

== Playing style ==
Sturgess, although not as naturally gifted as some of his contemporaries, was noted for his determination and willingness to graft; he was a tall, wiry defender, nicknamed hairpin because of his build. He was renowned for his skill in tackling and long, accurate kicking, and was almost ever-present in the Sheffield United team until his late thirties.

== International career ==
While with Sheffield United, Sturgess won 2 England caps – versus Northern Ireland at the Baseball Ground on 11 February 1911, and versus Scotland at Hampden Park on 14 April 1914.

== Career statistics ==
=== Club ===
Appearances and goals by club, season and competition
Club	Season	League			FA Cup		Total	
Club	Season	Division	Apps	Goals	Apps	Goals	Apps	Goals
Stoke	1902–03	First Division	1	0	0	0	1	0
Stoke	1903–04	First Division	3	0	0	0	3	0
Stoke	1904–05	First Division	9	0	0	0	9	0
Stoke	1905–06	First Division	37	0	2	1	39	1
Stoke	1906–07	First Division	37	2	3	0	40	2
Stoke	1907–08	Second Division	37	1	6	0	43	1
Stoke	Total		124	3	11	1	135	4
Sheffield United	1908–09	First Division	29	0	1	0	30	0
Sheffield United	1909–10	First Division	38	1	1	0	39	1
Sheffield United	1910–11	First Division	32	0	1	0	33	0
Sheffield United	1911–12	First Division	32	3	1	0	33	3
Sheffield United	1912–13	First Division	29	0	0	0	29	0
Sheffield United	1913–14	First Division	28	0	7	0	35	0
Sheffield United	1914–15	First Division	36	1	7	0	43	1
Sheffield United	1919–20	First Division	42	0	2	0	44	0
Sheffield United	1920–21	First Division	31	0	0	0	31	0
Sheffield United	1921–22	First Division	36	0	1	0	37	0
Sheffield United	1922–23	First Division	20	0	1	0	21	0
Sheffield United	Total		353	5	22	0	375	5
Norwich City	1923–24	Third Division South	32	0	3	0	35	0
Norwich City	1924–25	Third Division South	15	0	2	0	17	0
Norwich City	Total		47	0	5	0	52	0
Career total			524	8	38	1	562	9

=== International ===
National team	Year	Apps	Goals
England	1911	1	0
England	1914	1	0
Total		2	0

== Honours ==
Sheffield United

- FA Cup: 1914–15

England

- British Home Championship: 1910–11
