= Jack Thompson (footballer, born 1892) =

English footballer

Personal information
- Date of birth: 22 July 1892
- Place of birth: Redcar, England
- Date of death: 1 October 1969 (aged 77)
- Place of death: Bath, England
- Position: Outside right

Senior career*
Years	Team	Apps	(Gls)
- South Bank
1913–1914	Scunthorpe & Lindsey United		
1914–1920	Sheffield United	21	(1)
1920–1922	Bristol City	29	(1)
1922–1924	Bath City		
- * Club domestic league appearances and goals

John L. Thompson (22 July 1892 – 1 October 1969) was an English footballer who played for Sheffield United and Bristol City in the Football League.

== Playing career ==
Thompson initially gained prominence playing for Scunthorpe & Lindsey United, prompting the football committee at Bramall Lane(who oversaw all team affairs at this stage) to bring him to Sheffield United at the start of the 1914–15 season. With a settled side already in place he found it difficult to break into the first team and with the outbreak of war he was the first United player to join up for active duty, serving with the Royal Engineers. After the war he continued to make sporadic appearances for the Blades until 1920 when he asked to be transferred to a club in the south of the country for personal reasons.

He was duly signed by Bristol City for £500. He stayed there for two years before joining Bath City.

== Post-football ==
Following his retirement from playing he became a cinema manager in Treharris until 1939 after which he worked for J. S. Fry & Sons, the chocolate manufacturer where he trained the company football team. He died in Bath in 1969 following a car accident.
