= Billy Cook (footballer, born 1890) =

English footballer

Personal information
- Full name: William Cook
- Date of birth: 2 March 1890
- Place of birth: Usworth, Sunderland, England
- Date of death: 1974 (aged 83–84)
- Height: 5 ft 6 in (1.68 m)
- Position: Full back

Senior career*
Years	Team	Apps	(Gls)
?–1912	Hebburn Argyle		
1912–1927	Sheffield United	264	(0)
1927–?	Worksop Town		
- * Club domestic league appearances and goals

Billy Cook (2 March 1890 – 1974) was an English footballer who played for Sheffield United and Worksop Town. He was a lightweight but useful full back, a two footed tackler and solid defender.

== Club career ==
Billy Cook started playing with Hebburn Argyle where he took over the position vacated by Jack English. In April 1912 he transferred to Sheffield United where he became a first team regular. He stayed at the club for over 15 years but never scored a goal despite making over 300 appearances. The sides he played in were successful, however, and he was twice an FA Cup winner with the Blades, in 1915 and 1925.

He transferred to Worksop Town in August 1927.

== Honours ==
Sheffield United

- FA Cup: 1914–15, 1924–25
