= Sam Bagnall =

English footballer

Personal information
- Full name: Samuel Bagnall
- Date of birth: 6 February 1892
- Place of birth: Neepsend, Sheffield, England
- Date of death: 1946 (age 54)
- Place of death: Sheffield, England
- Height: 5 ft 8 in (1.73 m)
- Position: Outside right

Senior career*
Years	Team	Apps	(Gls)
- Clowne Rising Star
1912–1913	Chesterfield Town		
1913–1914	Sheffield United	7	(1)
1914–1916	South Liverpool		
1916–?	Welbeck Colliery		
- * Club domestic league appearances and goals

Samuel Bagnall (6 February 1892 – 1946) was an English footballer who played for Chesterfield Town and Sheffield United. Playing outside right, he was known for his pace, being described as a "better sprinter than a footballer."

== Club career ==
Born in Neepsend, Sheffield, Bagnall made his breakthrough at nearby Chesterfield Town but was quickly transferred to his home-town club Sheffield United for a fee of £152 in April 1913 (although the Blades later informed the Football League that the fee had been £350.) He also ran sprint events, winning the sprint at the 1913 Players' Union Sports competition.

Despite commanding a large fee for the time he failed to make an impact on the first team at Bramall Lane, making only seven appearances in just over a season before he was released at the outset of World War I.

== Personal life ==
Bagnall saw active service during the war, being wounded in his left shoulder and arm while serving in France, and was subsequently discharged in 1916. It was initially feared he would be permanently disabled, but he recovered enough to take up a job at Welbeck Colliery and played for their football team. In 1921, he took part in a charity footrace at Hyde Park, organised by the Park Ex-Serviceman to raise funds for a new sports pavilion.
