= Wally Masterman =

English footballer

Personal information
- Full name: Wallace Masterman
- Date of birth: 29 January 1888
- Place of birth: Newcastle upon Tyne, England
- Date of death: 24 January 1965 (aged 77)
- Place of death: Sheffield, England
- Position: Inside left

Senior career*
Years	Team	Apps	(Gls)
?	Stockton on Tees		
1910–1914	Gainsborough Trinity	41	(4)
1914–1920	Sheffield United	36	(12)
1920–2021	Stoke	0	(0)
- * Club domestic league appearances and goals

Wallace Masterman (29 January 1888 – 24 January 1965) was an English footballer who played for Stockton on Tees, Gainsborough Trinity and Sheffield United. He was skilful and elegant forward who scored many goals.

== Career ==
Masterman started playing in the North East of England with Stockton on Tees, at that time playing in the Northern League, he was very successful scoring 36 goals in one season. Following this success he transferred to Gainsborough Trinity a 2nd Division side before signing for Sheffield United in May 1914.

He had an excellent first season, playing regularly in the first team as they reached the FA Cup final in 1915. Appearing in the final Masterman almost scored, hitting the cross bar, but the ball rebounded out of the goal, Stanley Fazackerley then headed it past the Chelsea goalkeeper for the Blades second goal.

Upon the outbreak of World War I he joined the Coldstream Guards but returned to Sheffield after being medically discharged. He played regularly in the wartime football competitions and remained with The Blades once competitive matches recommenced in 1918. He picked up a serious knee injury in March 1919 and struggled for fitness from that time on.

Masterman transferred to Stoke in May 1920 but failed to make an appearance in the first team. He returned to Sheffield on his retirement and lived there until his death in 1965.

== Career statistics ==
Club	Season	League			FA Cup		Total	
Club	Season	Division	Apps	Goals	Apps	Goals	Apps	Goals
Gainsborough Trinity	1910–11	Second Division	30	3	5	2	35	5
Gainsborough Trinity	1911–12	Second Division	11	1	3	0	14	1
Sheffield United	1914–15	First Division	25	9	6	2	31	11
Sheffield United	1919–20	First Division	11	3	0	0	11	3
Stoke	1920–21	Second Division	0	0	0	0	0	0
Career Total			77	16	14	4	91	20

== Honours ==
Sheffield United

- FA Cup: 1914–15
