= Alf Wilson (English footballer) =

English footballer

Personal information
- Full name: Alfred Royle Wilson
- Date of birth: 1890
- Place of birth: Wortley, England
- Height: 5 ft 10 in (1.78 m)
- Position: Right back

Senior career*
Years	Team	Apps	(Gls)
- Malin Bridge
1912–1913	Sheffield Wednesday	0	(0)
1913–1919	Rotherham Town		
1915–1919	→ Sheffield United (wartime guest)		
1916	→ Notts County (wartime guest)		
1917–1919	→ Birmingham (wartime guest)		
1919–1920	Birmingham	2	(0)
1920–19??	Rotherham Town		
- * Club domestic league appearances and goals

Alfred Royle Wilson (1890 – after 1919) was an English professional footballer who played as a right back. Born in Wortley, near Sheffield, he played in the Football League for Birmingham between 1919 and 1920.

Prior to the First World War, Wilson was on the books of Sheffield Wednesday and also appeared as a guest player for cross-town rivals Sheffield United during the conflict, making 43 wartime appearances for the club. Having also guested for Notts County and Birmingham during the war years, Wilson signed a permanent deal with Birmingham in 1919 as cover at full back. He made his debut in the Second Division on Christmas Day 1919, standing in for Frank Womack in a 1–0 defeat away at Leicester City. This and the next day's reverse fixture, also a 1–0 defeat, were the only first-team appearances Wilson made before he returned to Yorkshire the following year and signed for Rotherham Town.
