= William Foulke (footballer) =

English footballer

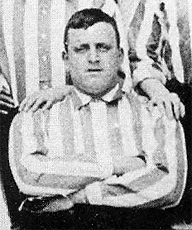
- Foulke in Sheffield United colours

Personal information
- Full name: William Henry Foulke
- Date of birth: 12 April 1874
- Date of death: 1 May 1916 (aged 42)
- Place of death: Sheffield, West Riding of Yorkshire, England
- Height: 1.89 m (6 ft 2 1/2 in)
- Position: Goalkeeper

Youth career
- Blackwell Miners Welfare

Senior career*
Years	Team	Apps	(Gls)
1894–1905	Sheffield United	299	(0)
1905–1907	Chelsea	34	(0)
1907–1908	Bradford City	22	(0)
Total		355	(0)

International career
1897	England	1	(0)
- * Club domestic league appearances and goals

William Henry Foulke (12 April 1874 – 1 May 1916; sometimes spelled Foulk, Foulkes), nicknamed Fatty, was an English professional cricketer and footballer. Foulke was renowned for his great size and weight, reaching perhaps 24 stone (152 kg; 336 lb) at the end of his career, although reports on his weight vary.

He played four first-class matches for Derbyshire County Cricket Club in the 1900 season, but is remembered primarily as a goalkeeper for Sheffield United although he later played for Chelsea and Bradford City.

== Early life ==
William Henry Foulke was born in Dawley, Shropshire, England.

== Playing career ==
After being discovered playing for village side Blackwell in a Derbyshire Cup tie at Ilkeston Town, Foulke made his debut for Sheffield United against West Bromwich Albion on 1 September 1894 and led the team to three FA Cup finals (winning two) and a League Championship.

According to The Cat's Pyjamas: The Penguin Book of Cliches (ISBN 9780141025162), the chant "Who ate all the pies?" was first sung in 1894 by Sheffield United supporters, and directed at Foulke's 300 lb (about 136 kg). However, this is disputed, as a September 2019 article on the BBC Sport website pointed out that the tune to which the chant is sung, "Knees Up Mother Brown", is believed to have originated in 1918, which was some two years after Foulke's death. Moreover, Foulke weighed only 178 pounds (81 kg) in 1894; his weight gain came much later.

Foulke won a single international cap for England in 1897 against Wales.

At the end of the first match in the 1902 FA Cup Final, Foulke protested to the officials that Southampton's equalising goal should not have been allowed. Foulke left his dressing room unclothed and pursued the referee, Tom Kirkham, who took refuge in a broom cupboard. Foulke had to be stopped by a group of F.A. officials from wrenching the cupboard door from its hinges to reach the hapless referee. In the replay, Sheffield United won 2–1, with Foulke being required to make several saves to keep United in the match. He was also in goal for United when they suffered an FA Cup exit to Second Division Burslem Port Vale in 1898.

Bradford City in the 1906–07 season – Foulke is at the centre of the back row.

Foulke then moved to Chelsea for a fee of £50 and was made club captain. Foulke by now was remarkably temperamental. If he thought his defenders were not trying hard enough, he would walk off the field. Opposing forwards who incurred his displeasure would be picked up and thrown bodily into his goal. He was, however, a great crowd puller, and Chelsea decided to exploit this. To draw even more attention to his size, they placed two small boys behind his goal in an effort to distract the opposition even more. The boys would sometimes run and return the ball when it went out of play, and, quite by accident, ball boys came into being. Foulke stayed for just one season before moving to his final club, Bradford City.

At some stage after his retirement, Foulkes had played a beat-the-goalie contest in Blackpool. In a short obituary to Foulkes, a Blackpool newspaper reminded its readers that Foulkes had "appeared in a good [sic] scoring side-show on the spare ground, Britannia Place, South Shore, where many a football aspirant tried their goal-scoring prowess against the once noted goalkeeper".

== Personal life ==
He also owned a beer house in Sheffield along with a shop in Matilda Street and was known to walk around his home town wearing his FA Cup winner's medal around his neck on a homemade chain.

Foulke appears in the Mitchell and Kenyon films, playing in a match on 6 September 1902. His nephew, Jim Simmons, was also a professional footballer. Foulke also inspired the character of William Fowkes in "The Blue Crusaders", a popular football story published in the Amalgamated Press story paper The Boys' Realm from 1906.

== Death ==
Foulke died on 1 May 1916 aged 42 in Sheffield, West Riding of Yorkshire (now located in South Yorkshire). He was buried in Burngreave cemetery, Sheffield, England. His death certificate gives "cirrhosis" as the major cause of death.

== Honours ==
Sheffield United

- Football League First Division: 1897–98
- FA Cup: 1898–99, 1901–02

== See also ==
- List of English cricket and football players
