= Bob Barnshaw =

English footballer

Personal information
- Full name: Robert John Barnshaw
- Date of birth: 14 March 1889
- Place of birth: Hebburn, County Durham, England
- Date of death: 30 January 1974 (aged 84)
- Place of death: Watford, Hertfordshire, England
- Position: Centre half

Youth career
- Hebburn Argyle

Senior career*
Years	Team	Apps	(Gls)
1910–1911	Sheffield Wednesday	0	(0)
1911–1913	Hebburn Argyle		
1913–1914	Sheffield United	3	(0)
1914–1921	Watford	58	(4)
1921–1922	Aberdare Athletic	24	(2)
- * Club domestic league appearances and goals

Robert John Barnshaw (14 March 1889 – 30 January 1974) was an English professional association footballer who played as a centre half in The Football League for Sheffield United, Watford and Aberdare Athletic.

After starting his career at hometown club Hebburn Argyle Barnshaw moved to Sheffield Wednesday but an injury prevented him from ever playing in the first team. Barnshaw returned to Hebburn Argyle despite Wednesday retaining his registration. He eventually transferred to Sheffield United for a total of £90 split between his two previous clubs.

After failing to make the break into the first team at Bramall Lane Barnshaw was sold to Watford after just one season for £50. During his first season at Watford, he played 11 games during Watford's 1914–15 title-winning season. He also played as a guest for Leeds City and Darlington during the First World War. before finishing his career at Aberdare Athletic.
