= David Davies (footballer, born 1888) =

Welsh footballer (born 1888)

Personal information
- Full name: David Walter Davies
- Date of birth: 4 October 1886
- Place of birth: Treharris, Wales
- Height: 5 ft 7 in (1.70 m)
- Position: Centre forward

Senior career*
Years	Team	Apps	(Gls)
1908–1909	Merthyr Town		
1910–1912	Treharris		
1912–1913	Oldham Athletic		
1913	Stockport County		
1913–1915	Sheffield United	27	(9)
1915–1916	Cardiff City	0	(0)
1919	Millwall Athletic		
1919–1920	Merthyr Town		
1920–1921	Treharris Albion		

International career^{‡}
1911–1913	Wales	2	(1)
- * Club domestic league appearances and goals as of 16:18, 12 July 2011 (UTC) ‡ National team caps and goals as of 16:18, 12 July 2011 (UTC)

David Walter Davies (born 4 October 1886, date of death unknown) was a Welsh footballer who played for Oldham Athletic and Sheffield United in the Football League First Division. He also made two appearances for Wales. He was born in Treharris, Wales.

== Club career ==
Davies was a former miner who made his league début whilst at Oldham Athletic in 1912. He soon transferred to Sheffield United via a brief stay at Stockport County. He spend two seasons at Bramall Lane, playing in the side that won the FA Cup in 1915 (although he himself did not feature in the final.)

With the outbreak of World War I Davies was released and returned to Wales where he became a miner once more whilst continuing to play football for local teams.

== International career ==
Davis made two appearances for Wales, the first whilst at Treharris, the second after his move to Oldham Athletic.
