= Ben Shearman =

English footballer

Personal information
- Date of birth: 2 December 1884
- Place of birth: Lincoln, England
- Date of death: 1 October 1958 (aged 73)
- Position: Outside left

Senior career*
Years	Team	Apps	(Gls)
1899–1900	Attercliffe		
1900–1905	High Hazels		
1905–1909	Rotherham Town		
1909–1911	Bristol City		
1911–1919	West Bromwich Albion		
1919–1920	Nottingham Forest		
1920–1924	Gainsborough Trinity		
1924–1938	Norton Woodseats		
- * Club domestic league appearances and goals

Benjamin W. Shearman (2 December 1884 – October 1958) was an English footballer who played as an outside left. Born in Lincoln he came to the fore with Rotherham Town before having spells with Bristol City, West Bromwich Albion and Nottingham Forest. He gained an FA Cup losers medal whilst with West Brom having played in the 1912 final. Despite missing four years of his career due to World War I he made 217 appearances in the Football League.

== Career ==
Shearman was originally spotted playing in the Sheffield School League and was eventually signed by Rotherham Town. Renowned as a speedy winger with an accurate crossing ability he was transferred to Bristol City with whom he made his Football League début in 1909.

After two seasons at Bristol he moved to West Bromwich Albion where he enjoyed the most successful spell of his career, featuring in the 1912 FA Cup Final where the Baggies eventually lost to Barnsley in a replay at Bramall Lane.

With the outset of World War I he moved back to Sheffield to work in steel production at Tinsley whilst making regular guest appearances for Sheffield United before eventually joining the army.

Following the end of the war he was bought by Nottingham Forest for £2,500 but lasted only one season before moving back into non-league football with Gainsborough Trinity.
