= Harold Buddery =

English footballer (1889-1962)

Personal information
- Full name: Harold Buddery
- Date of birth: 6 October 1889
- Place of birth: Sheffield, England
- Date of death: 23 August 1962 (aged 72)
- Place of death: Sheffield, England
- Position: Striker

Senior career*
Years	Team	Apps	(Gls)
?−1912	Denaby United		
1912–1913	Doncaster Rovers		(22)
1913–?	Portsmouth		
?	Rotherham County		
?	Sheffield Wednesday		
1921–1922	Southend United		
1924–?	Rotherham Town		
- * Club domestic league appearances and goals

Harold Buddery (6 October 1889 – 23 August 1962) was an English footballer who played for Portsmouth in the Football League and also had spells with Doncaster Rovers, Southend United and Rotherham Town.

Born in Sheffield he played for a number of Yorkshire clubs as a guest during World War I including Barnsley, Bradford Park Avenue, Huddersfield Town and Sheffield United.
