= Harry Hall (footballer, born 1893) =

English footballer

Personal information
- Date of birth: 20 October 1893
- Place of birth: Newark-on-Trent, Nottinghamshire, England
- Date of death: 7 March 1961 (aged 67)
- Place of death: Newark-on-Trent, Nottinghamshire, England
- Height: 5 ft 9 in (1.75 m)
- Position: Striker

Senior career*
Years	Team	Apps	(Gls)
- Gainsborough Trinity
- Newark
- Long Eaton Rangers
- Long Eaton St Helens
1913–1915	Sheffield United	5	(0)
1919–?	Long Eaton Rangers		
- Worksop Town
1920	Ilkeston United		
1920–1922	Sheffield Wednesday		
1922	Gainsborough Trinity		
1922	Newark Town		
1922–?	Long Eaton St Helens		
- Grantham Town
1924–1927	Ransome & Marles		
- * Club domestic league appearances and goals

Harry Hall (20 October 1893 – 7 March 1961) was an English footballer who played in the Football League for both Sheffield United and Sheffield Wednesday. He also had spells at numerous clubs in the Lincolnshire area.

Hall was born in 1893 in Newark-on-Trent, Nottinghamshire to John William Hall and Elizabeth (née Hopkinson), the eldest son in a well-known football family. He was the older brother of footballers Willie Hall (who played for Tottenham Hotspur and England), Cyril Hall and Herbert Hall.

Hall started his football career with Winthorpe F.C. In 1911, he joined Gainsborough Trinity, where he played four or five games. After Gainsborough, he joined his home town club, Newark, before being secured by Long Eaton St Helens. In April 1913, he signed for Sheffield United, with whom he stayed through the start of the First World War. After the war, he played for various clubs including Ilkeston United, before being signed for Sheffield Wednesday in December 1920. After leaving Wednesday in 1922, he played for several clubs in Newark and Lincolnshire.

Hall died at home in Newark-on-Trent in 1961. Hall is buried at Newark Cemetery.
