= George Utley =

English footballer

Personal information
- Full name: George Utley
- Date of birth: 16 May 1887
- Place of birth: Elsecar, Barnsley, England
- Date of death: 8 January 1966 (aged 78)
- Place of death: Blackpool, England
- Height: 5 ft 10 in (1.78 m)
- Position: Half back

Senior career*
Years	Team	Apps	(Gls)
1906	Sheffield Wednesday	0	(0)
1907–1913	Barnsley	167	(8)
1913–1922	Sheffield United	107	(4)
1922	Manchester City	1	(0)
Total		275	(12)

International career
1913	England	1	(0)
- * Club domestic league appearances and goals

George Utley (16 May 1887 – 8 January 1966) was an English footballer who played for Barnsley, Sheffield United and England. He was a strong and powerful half back who could shoot at goal when required.

Utley was born in Reform Row, Elsecar, which lies south of Barnsley. He was the 11th and final child of James and Mary Utley. His father was an engine tender at a colliery and his brothers worked in the local coal mines and foundries.

== Club career ==
=== Barnsley ===
On leaving school he became a joiner, but by 1907 he had signed with Barnsley. During his time with Barnsley the club made it to two FA Cup Finals. The first was in 1910, when they were beaten by Newcastle United 2–0 in a replay after a one all draw, and the second was in 1912, when Barnsley managed to defeat West Bromwich Albion by one goal in the replay after the first game ended in a goalless draw.

He made a total of 167 league appearances for Barnsley, scoring eight goals.

=== Sheffield United ===
During the 1913–14 season, Sheffield United were looking to sign a new captain to change their fortunes, having struggled in both the league and cup since the retirement of Ernest Needham. Following a letter of recommendation from United player Billy Gillespie, the man they targeted was George Utley.

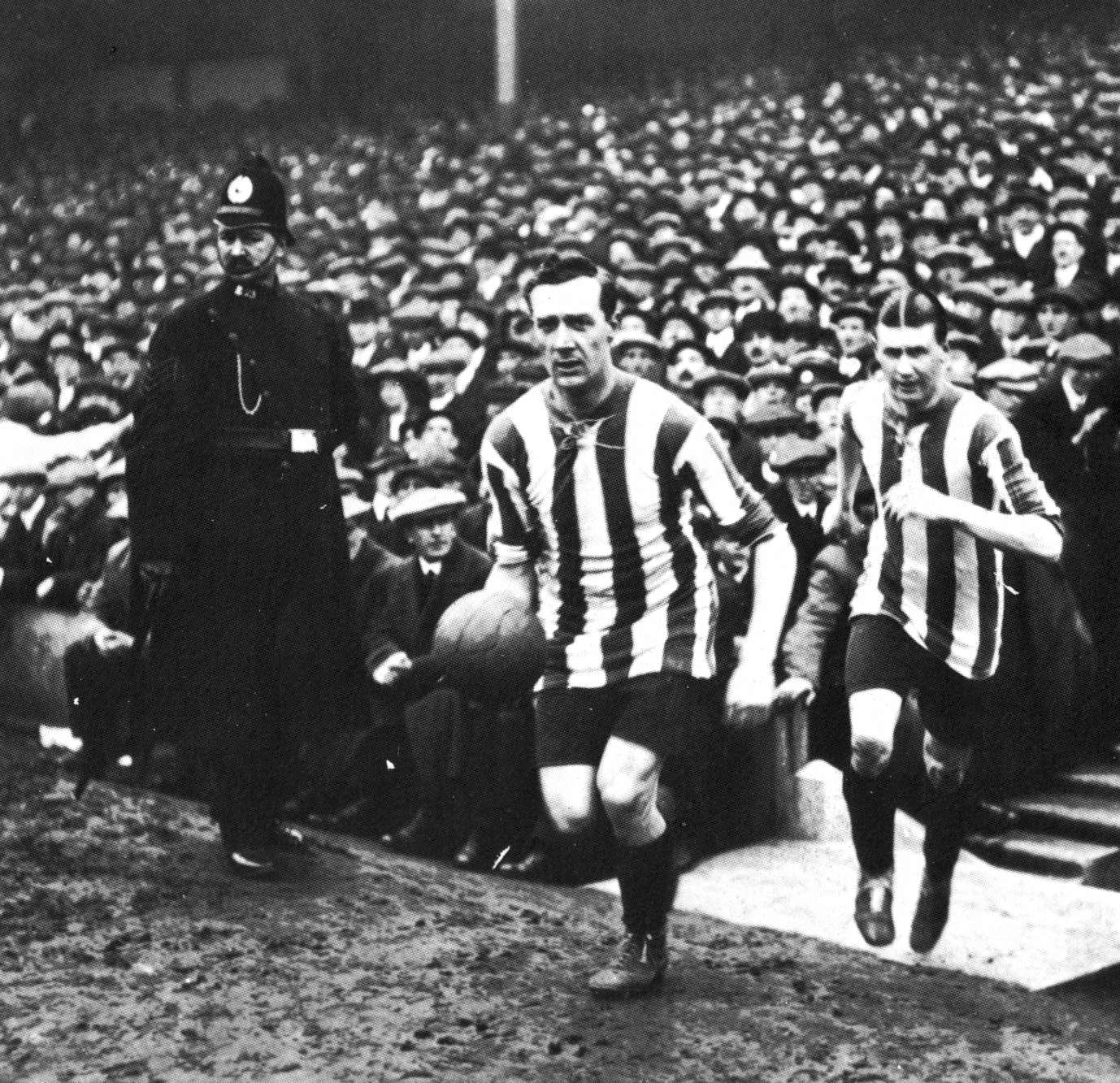
Utley leads Sheffield United out for the 1915 FA Cup final

The committee were not unanimous about signing Utley, who they feared would fetch a large fee. Bolton Wanderers had previously offered £1,500, which had been rejected by Barnsley. The Blades offered more and were also turned down. United offered £2,000 which was accepted, making him the joint-most expensive player in Britain at the time. Utley signed a five-year contract, with the promise of a benefit match at the end of it.

He made his debut for Sheffield United against Manchester United at Bramall Lane on 22 November 1913, in a match the Blades won 2–0.

In the semi-final of the 1914–15 FA Cup, Utley's goal in the 2–1 victory over Bolton Wanderers was described as "the best of his career", as he dribbled the ball 60 yards before scoring. Utley subsequently played in his third FA Cup final as the Blades defeated Chelsea 3–0 on 24 April 1915. Utley, as captain, worked hard and decisively throughout the game, breaking up many Chelsea attacks and providing many passes to the United forwards. Sheffield United's success in the cup when compared to previous seasons was credited to Utley.

He left Bramall Lane in 1922, transferring to Manchester City but retired within twelve months of the move.

== Coaching ==
After leaving Manchester City, Utley went on to hold the position of trainer at Bristol City before moving to Sheffield Wednesday in May 1924 as coach. He then moved on to become a trainer at Fulham in July 1925, a position he remained in until 1927.

== International career ==
In February 1913, while still with Barnsley, Utley was selected to play for England against Ireland. England were defeated 2–1, Ireland's first victory over England; he was not selected to play for England again. This remains the only England appearance by a Barnsley player.

== Legacy ==
It could be argued that Utley's greatest impact on football in England was regarding the award of testimonial and benefit games. Usually players were awarded a benefit game for long service and allowed to choose a match, excluding derby games and large visiting clubs, from which to receive the gate receipts as recognition of their services.

Utley challenged this in 1920 and was granted a benefit match against the then mighty Sunderland after only four seasons, eventually receiving around £1,000. The board had been willing to make an exception for Utley, citing his importance to the team and wishing to ensure he stayed with the club.

This extraordinary move by the club caused unrest in the dressing room and nine of the first team signed a letter to the United directors, written by Billy Gillespie, complaining that this preferential treatment was unfair. The game went ahead a few days later without Utley, although ironically Billy Gillespie scored twice in a 3–1 win in front of over 36,000 spectators. Utley stayed at Bramall Lane for another two years.

The Football League discovered the unrest this benefit had caused at the club and changed the rules governing such matches. They stipulated that testimonials could only be played after an agreed period of time stated within a players contract, or upon their career being unexpectedly cut short. This ruling remains to this day.

== Life outside football ==
Utley worked as an assistant cricket coach at Rossall School from 1911 until 1931 and from 1929 until 1931 he also worked as assistant groundsman.

Astute in financial matters, Utley married into a wealthy family following the death of his first wife. Having no children from either marriage he returned his second wife's money to her family upon her death claiming he had enough to keep him. Living in a large house he kept two housekeepers to whom he bequeathed a home on the estate for peppercorn rent upon his death.

During the later part of his football career he authored articles for boys magazines including:

- Football by Prominent Players: "Captaining the Cup-Winners", The Boys' Friend Feb, 14 1920
- "The Complete Half-Back", The Boys' Realm, 20 Mar 1920

Utley died in January 1966.

== Career statistics ==
=== Club ===
Appearances and goals by club, season and competition
Club	Season	League			FA Cup		Total	
Club	Season	Division	Apps	Goals	Apps	Goals	Apps	Goals
Barnsley	1908–09	Division Two	15	1	0	0	15	1
Barnsley	1909–10	Division Two	35	0	9	1	44	1
Barnsley	1910–11	Division Two	36	1	2	0	38	1
Barnsley	1911–12	Division Two	34	4	12	0	46	4
Barnsley	1912–13	Division Two	36	1	3	0	39	1
Barnsley	1913–14	Division Two	11	1	0	0	11	1
Barnsley	Total		167	8	26	1	193	9
Sheffield United	1913–14	Division One	23	1	7	4	30	5
Sheffield United	1914–15	Division One	30	1	7	1	37	2
Sheffield United	1919–20	Division One	16	0	0	0	16	0
Sheffield United	1920–21	Division One	23	2	0	0	23	2
Sheffield United	1921–22	Division One	15	0	1	0	16	0
Sheffield United	Total		107	4	15	5	122	9
Manchester City	1922–23	Division One	1	0	0	0	1	0
Career total			275	12	41	6	316	18

== Honours ==
Barnsley

- FA Cup: 1911–12; runner-up: 1909–10

Sheffield United

- FA Cup: 1914–15
