= Fred Hawley =

English footballer

Personal information
- Full name: Frederick Hawley
- Date of birth: 28 July 1890
- Place of birth: Derby, England
- Date of death: May 1954 (aged 63)
- Place of death: Derby, England
- Height: 6 ft 0 in (1.83 m)
- Position: Centre half

Senior career*
Years	Team	Apps	(Gls)
- Derby Midland
- Ripley Town & Athletic
1913–1919	Sheffield United	57	(1)
1919–1920	Coventry City	14	(3)
1920	Birmingham	3	(0)
1920–1923	Swindon Town	90	(4)
1923–1925	Bristol City	75	(1)
1925–1926	Brighton & Hove Albion	37	(4)
1926–1928	Queens Park Rangers	29	(1)
1928–1929	Loughborough Corinthians		
- * Club domestic league appearances and goals

Frederick Hawley (28 July 1890 – May 1954) was an English professional footballer born in Derby who made 305 appearances in the Football League playing for Sheffield United, Coventry City, Birmingham, Swindon Town, Bristol City, Brighton & Hove Albion and Queens Park Rangers. He made guest appearances for Derby County, Notts County F.C., Birmingham and Nottingham Forest during the First World War.
