= Jimmy Revill =

English footballer

Personal information
- Full name: James William Revill
- Date of birth: 14 June 1891
- Place of birth: Sutton-in-Ashfield, England
- Date of death: 9 April 1917 (aged 25)
- Place of death: Béthune, France
- Height: 5 ft 7 in (1.70 m)
- Position: Outside left

Senior career*
Years	Team	Apps	(Gls)
- Sutton Junction
- Tibshelf
1910–1917	Sheffield United	60	(3)
1916–1917	→ Chesterfield Town (loan)	25	(6)
- → Sutton Town (loan)
- → New Hucknall Colliery (loan)
- * Club domestic league appearances and goals

James William Revill (14 June 1891 – 9 April 1917) was an English footballer who played for Sheffield United. Born in Sutton-in-Ashfield, he remained at the club until his death during active service in France during World War I.

== Playing career ==
Revill spent the majority of his time at Bramall Lane in the reserves, only achieving short runs in the first team due to injuries to others. Despite this he still made sixty starts for the Blades before the outbreak of war in Europe.

Having enlisted for the army he served as a lance-corporal in the Royal Engineers in France until 1917 when it was reported he had been killed in action. It was later suggested that he had only been wounded and had actually died of his injuries in a military hospital on his return to England. Revill died at the 33rd Casualty Clearing Station, Béthune of a gunshot wound to the back on 9 April 1917 and was buried at Bethune Town Cemetery. A benefit match was held for his widow and children at Bramall Lane in 1918.
