= Jim Simmons (footballer) =

English footballer

Personal information
- Full name: James William Simmons
- Date of birth: 27 June 1889
- Place of birth: Blackwell, Bolsover, Derbyshire, England
- Date of death: June 1972 (aged 82–83)
- Height: 5 ft 6 1/2 in (1.69 m)
- Positions: Inside right; outside right

Senior career*
Years	Team	Apps	(Gls)
–1908	Blackwell Colliery		
1908–1920	Sheffield United	204	(43)
1920–1922	West Ham United	27	(1)
- * Club domestic league appearances and goals

James William Simmons (27 June 1889 – June 1972) was an English footballer who played for Sheffield United and West Ham United. He was a fast and at times a brilliant player. He was a nephew of William "Fatty" Foulke but had the opposite physique. After retiring from football Jimmy Simmons became the Landlord of the Red Lion Public House on Matlock Green, in Matlock in the 1920s. During this time he played cricket for Matlock Cricket Club, and still holds the record Clubs highest score of 165* not out, in a match against Bakewell Cricket Club in 1925.

== Club career ==
Simmons started out with his home side, Blackwell Colliery. In 1908 he transferred to Sheffield United. He was a member of the Sheffield United team who won the FA Cup final in 1915. The Manchester Guardian stated that he was the most attractive player on the pitch and his quick attacks, which he mixed between runs down the wing and through the centre, left the Chelsea defence standing. He scored the first goal of the match just before half time when he half volleyed a cross into the top corner of the net.

He was at West Ham United, then of the Second Division, for two seasons, joining in 1920. He played his final game for the club on 29 March 1922 but was forced to retire from football thereafter.

== Honours ==
Sheffield United

- FA Cup: 1914–15
