= Fred Charles (footballer) =

English footballer

Personal information
- Full name: Frederick Charles
- Position: Inside forward

Senior career*
Years	Team	Apps	(Gls)
1907–1909	Doncaster Rovers		
1909–1910	Mexborough		
1910–1912	Sheffield United	7	(0)
1912–1915	Castleford Town		
- * Club domestic league appearances and goals as of 14:41, 7 December 2011 (UTC)

Frederick 'Fred' Charles was an English footballer who played as an inside forward for Sheffield United in the Football League along with spells at Doncaster Rovers and Castleford Town.

During World War I he returned to Sheffield and guested for his old club on a number of occasions, ironically featuring more than he ever had in peace time games. He also made a number of guest appearances for a number of clubs playing against United who had found themselves a player short, including Grimsby Town, Notts County, Birmingham and Hull City.
