= Ted Hufton =

English footballer

Personal information
- Full name: Arthur Edward Hufton
- Date of birth: 25 November 1892
- Place of birth: Southwell, England
- Date of death: 2 February 1967 (aged 74)
- Place of death: Swansea, Wales
- Height: 5 ft 10 in (1.78 m)
- Position: Goalkeeper

Senior career*
Years	Team	Apps	(Gls)
- Atlas & Norfolk Works
1912–1919	Sheffield United	15	(0)
1919–1932	West Ham United	370	(0)
1932–1933	Watford	2	(0)

International career
1923–1929	England	6	(0)
- * Club domestic league appearances and goals

Arthur Edward Hufton (25 November 1892 – 2 February 1967) was an England international goalkeeper who earned six caps for his country. Born in Southwell, Nottinghamshire, he spent the majority of his career at West Ham United but also had spells at Sheffield United and Watford.

== Club career ==
He began his playing career at Atlas & Norfolk Works in Sheffield, before becoming a Sheffield United player for a fee of £20. He was generally regarded as understudy to Harold Gough, which limited his appearances during his time at Bramall Lane.

With the outbreak of World War I he joined the Coldstream Guards but was wounded in France. On recovering he would play regularly for West Ham United as a guest player and eventually transferred to the Hammers permanently after the end of the conflict.

West Ham United paid £300 for his services fee and he went on to play for the club until 1932, becoming a Hammers legend. He made 456 appearances for West Ham (54 as a wartime guest), ranking him twelfth in the list of appearances for the club, even playing at right back for one of these games.

He was part of the West Ham team that were elected to The Football League for the first time in 1919, and went on to win promotion to the First Division during the 1922–23 season. He also appeared in the famous White Horse Final, the first FA Cup final at the brand new Wembley Stadium.

Hufton finished his playing career with Watford, for whom he played two league matches in the 1932–33 season.

== International career ==
He made his international début against Belgium on 1 November 1923, the game finishing 2–2. During his second international game, on 22 October 1927 at Windsor Park, Belfast, against Ireland, Hufton broke his arm and had to leave the pitch after 40 minutes to be rushed to hospital. England's Jack Hill also had to leave the game, at half-time, due to injury. England continued the second half with only nine players and lost, 2–0. In only his third game for his country, on 28 March 1928, an England team that was packed with many big stars, including Dixie Dean, Roy Goodall and Joe Bradford was beaten at home 5–1 by Scotland. He earned his final cap as an England player on 15 May 1929 when England lost to Spain, who narrowly edged a 4–3 victory.

== Post-football ==
On his retirement from playing he went into the motor trade in London and after World War II returned to Upton Park to act as a press room steward on match days. He suffered with poor health in later life and following a road accident, and with failing eyesight, he moved to Swansea, where he died in 1967.

== Tribute ==
"Ted Hufton, the goalkeeper, was another of my heroes, and he was always in the Press Room after a match at Upton Park, dispensing yarns and memories with the utmost amiability." - Ted Fenton, West Ham United Manager.

== Honours ==
West Ham United

- FA Cup runner-up: 1922–23
