= Joseph Kitchen =

English footballer who played as a striker

Joe Kitchen
Personal information
- Full name: Joseph Ernest Kitchen
- Date of birth: 20 June 1890
- Place of birth: Brigg, Lincolnshire, England
- Date of death: 23 November 1974 (aged 84)
- Place of death: Enfield, England
- Height: 5 ft 8 in (1.73 m)
- Position: Centre forward

Youth career
- 1904–?: Ancholme United

Senior career*
Years	Team	Apps	(Gls)
- Brigg Britannia
- Brigg Town
1906–1908	Gainsborough Trinity		
1908–1920	Sheffield United	235	(102)
1920	Rotherham County		
1920–1921	Sheffield United	13	(2)
1921–1922	Hull City		
1922–1924	Scunthorpe & Lindsey United		
1924–1925	Gainsborough Trinity		
1925	Shirebrook		
1925–1926	Gainsborough Trinity		
1926–?	Barton Town		
- * Club domestic league appearances and goals

Joseph Ernest Kitchen (Joe Kitchen)(20 June 1890 – 23 November 1974) was an English footballer who played as a striker. Born in Brigg, Lincolnshire he played for Gainsborough Trinity, Sheffield United and Hull City. He was known as a prolific goal scorer.

== Club career ==
Kitchen came to prominence whilst playing for Division Two side Gainsborough Trinity. Though clubs were interested in securing his services, Kitchen signed for Sheffield United in 1909 as part of a £600 deal that also took fellow forward Gee Gee Brown to Bramall Lane. Making his United début aged only 17, Kitchen became a mainstay of the side, scoring regularly throughout his time with the Blades. He scored several goals for Sheffield during their FA Cup campaign of 1915, scoring the third and final Sheffield goal in the final a few minutes from the final whistle. The goal was a solo effort, he picked the ball up just over the centre line, beat two defenders and then slipped past the Chelsea keeper, who had come out to challenge Kitchen, before placing the ball in the empty net.

Kitchen remained at United for the duration of World War I and into the resumption of league football in 1919. He was transferred to Rotherham County for £650 in 1920 after a disagreement over his contract but failed to settle and returned to Bramall Lane within a matter of months after United agreed to repay the fee. Falling out of favour by this time Kitchen finally moved on to Hull City the following season for a much reduced fee of £250 from where he drifted through a number of clubs including two further spells back at Gainsborough.

== Honours ==
Sheffield United

- FA Cup: 1914–15
