= John Nicholson (football secretary) =

English club secretary for Sheffield United F.C. (1864–1932)

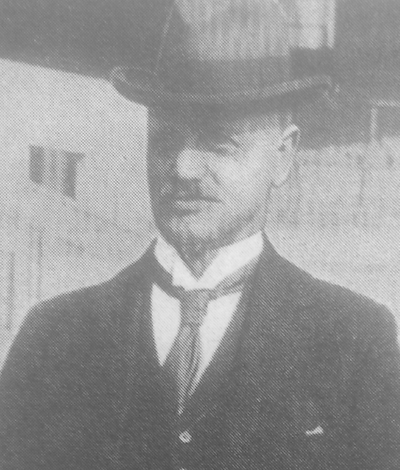
- Contemporary portrait of John Nicholson
- Born: 1864; Sheffield, England
- Died: 23 April 1932 (aged 68); Sheffield, England
- Occupation: Club Secretary at Sheffield United from 1899 to 1932

John Nicholson (1864 – 23 April 1932) was club secretary for Sheffield United for over 30 years. During this period the club did not employ a 'manager' but Nicholson undertook many of the duties currently associated with a modern-day football manager.

Born in Attercliffe in Sheffield, Nicholson was originally a lawyer's clerk who was active with the Sheffield and Hallamshire FA as well as secretary of Attercliffe F.C.

In 1899 he was offered the post of club secretary at Sheffield United when the club became a Limited Company and remained in the role until his death. Although the team was coached by a trainer and selected by a committee, Nicholson ran the club on a day-to-day basis, dealing with transfers and other finances, liaising with the Football Association and looking after the players' general affairs. Regarded as one of the most respected men in football at the time he had a vast number of contacts throughout the game and was an expert in the rules, laws and regulations of the sport.

Nicholson presided over the most successful period in The Blades history, winning four FA Cups in 1899, 1902, 1915 and 1925 (also reaching the final in 1901, 1936) and maintaining United as a dominant league force, winning the old 1st division Championship in 1898. Despite never holding the post of manager at The Blades, he was offered just such a position at Manchester City in 1926 but turned it down, preferring to remain in his home town.

Nicholson died in 1932 after being knocked down by a lorry whilst crossing the road outside Sheffield Midland Station on his way to join the team, who were heading off to Birmingham to play a match against Aston Villa. Local newspaper reports estimated that over 6,000 people attended his funeral.

== Managerial statistics ==
Managerial record by team and tenure
Team	From	To	Record				
Team	From	To	G	W	D	L	Win %
Sheffield United	1 June 1899	23 April 1932	1,216	486	281	449	39.97
Total			1,216	486	281	449	39.97

== Honours ==
Sheffield United

- Division One Champions 1898

- Runners Up: 1900

- FA Cup

- Winners: 1899, 1902, 1915, 1925
- Runners up: 1901
