= Tom Richardson (footballer) =

English footballer

Personal information
- Date of birth: 1891
- Place of birth: Worksop, England
- Positions: Right back; left back

Senior career*
Years	Team	Apps	(Gls)
1908–1910	Worksop Town		
1910–1911	Retford Town		
1911–1916	Sheffield United	2	(0)
1919–1929	Worksop Town		
- * Club domestic league appearances and goals

Tom Richardson (1891 – after 1929) was an English footballer who played as a full back and spent the majority of his career at Worksop Town. He did have a three-year spell in the Football League with Sheffield United but managed only a handful of appearances in that time. He was born in Worksop.

== Career ==
Richardson started his career with Worksop Town, spent a season at Retford Town, and eventually arrived at Sheffield United. He failed to succeed at what was then one of the top sides in the country and made only a couple of appearances in the Football League and a handful more during wartime football.

Richardson had initially worked in Manton Colliery and enlisted in the army during the First World War, he returned to Worksop Town on his discharge where he spend ten years as a mainstay of the side, captaining it for much of that time.
