= Robert Evans (footballer, born 1885) =

English footballer (1885–1965)

Personal information
- Full name: Robert Ernest Evans
- Date of birth: 21 November 1885
- Place of birth: Chester, England
- Date of death: 28 November 1965 (aged 80)
- Place of death: Chester, England
- Position: Left winger

Youth career
- Saltney Ferry

Senior career*
| Years | Team | Apps | (Gls) |
| 1904–1905 | Chester | 1 | (0) |
| 1905–1906 | Wrexham | 31 | (3) |
| 1906–1908 | Aston Villa | 16 | (4) |
| 1908–1915 | Sheffield United | 204 | (39) |
| Total | | 252 | (46) |

International career
| 1906–1910 | Wales | 10 | (2) |
| 1911–1912 | England | 4 | (1) |
- * Club domestic league appearances and goals

Robert Ernest Evans (21 November 1885 – 28 November 1965) was an English professional footballer, who played as a left-winger for Aston Villa (1906–1908) and Sheffield United (1908–1915). He won the FA Cup with Sheffield United in 1915 and played international football for both Wales and England.

== Career ==
Evans was born in Chester, England of Welsh parents. He started his football career with Saltney Ferry. In December 1904 he moved to Chester but played just one league and one Welsh Cup match for the club (both against Wrexham) and returned to Saltney Ferry. He was then spotted by the Welsh professional club Wrexham for whom he signed in the summer of 1905, in time for their inaugural season in the Birmingham and District League. He made his debut for Wales in a 2–0 victory over Scotland on 3 March 1906; this was followed by a 1–0 defeat by England a few days later. These performances attracted the attention of Aston Villa who signed him in the summer of 1906 for a fee of £30.

Whilst at Villa he continued to add to his tally of Welsh caps. Despite this, he made only occasional appearances for Villa, playing nine league games in 1906–07 and seven in 1907–08 when Villa finished runners-up in the Football League.

In 1908 he moved (with Peter Kyle for a combined fee of £1100) to Sheffield United where he soon became an automatic first choice player. He continued to appear for Wales until by 1910 he had ten Welsh caps with two goals to his credit. He had played four times against England, the 1–0 loss in 1906, the 1–1 draw in 1907, the 7–1 loss in 1908 and the 1–0 loss in 1910. His final appearance for Wales was against Ireland on 11 April 1910 when he scored twice in a 4–0 victory. It was then discovered that, although both his parents were Welsh, he had been born in Chester and under the rules of the time was therefore qualified to play only for England.

He then made four appearances for England, all at outside left and all as a Sheffield United player, in 1911 and 1912, including 3–0 and 2–0 victories against Wales. He scored his only England goal on his debut against Ireland on 11 February 1911.

Evans was a member of the Sheffield United team that won the FA Cup in 1915. This was his final competitive appearance for Sheffield United and he retired from playing professionally during the First World War, although he turned out in the Cheshire County League for Crichtons Athletic.

He took up employment at the Shell Mex oil company in Ellesmere Port and turned out for their works team.

He died on 28 November 1965, shortly after his 80th birthday.

== Honours ==
Sheffield United

- FA Cup: 1914–15

== See also ==
- List of association footballers who have been capped for two senior national teams
- List of Wales international footballers born outside Wales
