= Bill Brelsford =

English footballer

Personal information
- Full name: William Henry Brelsford
- Date of birth: 1885
- Place of birth: Sheffield, England
- Date of death: 25 March 1954 (aged 68–69)
- Place of death: Sheffield, England
- Height: 5 ft 7 in (1.70 m)
- Position: Centre half

Senior career*
| Years | Team | Apps | (Gls) |
| 1902–1904 | Attercliffe United | | |
| 1904–190? | Tinsley Park | | |
- Lodge Inn
- Rawmarsh Albion
| 1907–1910 | Doncaster Rovers | | (5) |
| 1910–1925 | Sheffield United | 277 | (1) |
| 1925 | Torquay United | | |
- * Club domestic league appearances and goals

William Henry Brelsford (1885 – 25 March 1954), known as Bill or Beau Brelsford, was an English footballer who played for Doncaster Rovers and Sheffield United. He was a hardworking player and could play as a right half or centre half.

== Club career ==
Bill Brelsford came from a footballing family, two brothers playing for Sheffield Wednesday, but he made his league début with Doncaster Rovers. In 1910 he transferred back to his home town Sheffield but he did not join his brothers at Wednesday, joining cross-city rivals Sheffield United instead. He was a member of the Blades team who won the FA Cup final in 1915 where it was reported he broke up many of the Chelsea attacks by heading the ball back towards their half.

After a lengthy career at Bramall Lane he had a brief spell at Torquay United before returning to Sheffield where he became assistant trainer at his former club, eventually rising to first team trainer between 1932 and 1935. Following his retirement he became kennel master at Darnall greyhound track.

== Honours ==
Sheffield United

- FA Cup: 1914–15
