= Oliver Tummon =

English footballer

Personal information
- Full name: Oliver Tummon
- Date of birth: 3 March 1884
- Place of birth: Sheffield, England
- Date of death: 1 October 1955 (aged 71)
- Place of death: Sheffield, England
- Positions: Outside right; outside left

Youth career
- South Street New Connection

Senior career*
| Years | Team | Apps | (Gls) |
| 1901–1902 | Gainsborough Trinity | | |
| 1902–1910 | Sheffield Wednesday | | |
| 1910–1912 | Gainsborough Trinity | | |
| 1912–1919 | Oldham Athletic | 108 | (19) |
| 1919–1920 | Sheffield United | 23 | (2) |
| 1920–1922 | Barnsley | | |
- * Club domestic league appearances and goals

Oliver Tummon (3 March 1884 – October 1955) was an English footballer who played as an outside right or outside left. Born in Sheffield he had spells at both Sheffield Wednesday and Sheffield United along with time at Gainsborough Trinity and Oldham Athletic. His great grandson is Tim Besley.

== Career ==
Tummon played as an amateur in the local Sheffield leagues before a spell at Gainsborough Trinity prompted Sheffield Wednesday to offer his a professional contract in 1903 after a year on their books on amateur terms. The form of other players in the side however meant that he was unable to secure a regular place in the first team and eventually returned to Gainsborough Trinity. This signalled the start of his most successful spell, having two ever present seasons at Gainsborough before moving to Oldham Athletic where he missed only six games in three seasons.

With the outbreak of World War I he returned to his home town of Sheffield to work in the munitions factories there and began to make regular guest appearances for Sheffield United. After the end of the war he was offered a permanent contract with the Blades but played only one further season before moving on to Barnsley where he finished his career.
