= Stan Fazackerley =

English footballer

Personal information
- Full name: Stanley Nicholas Fazackerley
- Date of birth: 3 October 1891
- Place of birth: Preston, England
- Date of death: 20 June 1946 (aged 54)
- Place of death: Sheffield, England
- Height: 5 ft 11 1/2 in (1.82 m)
- Position: Inside right

Youth career
- Lane Ends United
- 1908: Preston North End

Senior career*
Years	Team	Apps	(Gls)
1911–1912	Charlestown		
1912	Accrington Stanley		
1912–1913	Hull City	29	(19)
1913–1920	Sheffield United	105	(43)
1920–1922	Everton	51	(21)
1922–1925	Wolverhampton Wanderers	70	(28)
1925	Kidderminster Harriers		
1925–1926	Derby County	3	(2)
Total		257	(113)
- * Club domestic league appearances and goals

Stanley Nicholas Fazackerley (3 October 1891 – 20 June 1946) was an English footballer who played as an inside right. Born in Preston he had spells at a number of clubs including Accrington Stanley, Hull City, Sheffield United and Everton and was known as a clever skilful player with a powerful and accurate shot.

== Club career ==
Fazackerley played for the reserve team at hometown club Preston North End, but left the club to sail to the US in 1911 and played for Charleston during the 1911–12 season. Upon his return to Britain in 1912, he briefly played with Accrington Stanley before moving to Hull City for a fee of £50 where he scored 19 goals in 27 Division 2 games. This brought him to the attention of Sheffield United who paid £1,000 for his services, then a record fee for the club. He was a mainstay of the team and played a large part in the club's success in the FA Cup in 1914 and 1915. He played part in the FA Cup final in 1915 and scored the second United goal by heading in a shot from Wally Masterman that had rebounded from the bar ensuring that he picked up a winners medal.

During World War I he remained registered with the Blades but caused friction when he turned out for Preston North End without permission. He subsequently joined the Royal Field Artillery and was then allowed to make guest appearances for Blackpool and Chelsea whilst on active service. After the war he remained with The Blades and was selected for an FA tour of South Africa in 1920 but his form declined on his return and he requested a transfer soon after.

He eventually joined Everton for £4,000 - a huge amount for the time - although Stan's own part in the transfer led to an FA enquiry. Coming to the end of his career he moved to Wolverhampton Wanderers after a couple of seasons before finishing his career at Derby County.

== Personal life ==
Fazackerley's younger brother James fought with the Loyal North Lancashire Regiment during the First World War and was reported missing, presumed dead, during the Battle of Cambrai on 30 November 1917.

== Honours ==
Sheffield United

- FA Cup: 1914–15

Wolverhampton Wanderers

- Football League Third Division North: 1923–24
