= Jack English (footballer, born 1886) =

English footballer and manager

Personal information
- Full name: John Cogal English
- Date of birth: 13 December 1886
- Place of birth: Hebburn, England
- Date of death: 21 January 1953 (age 66)
- Place of death: Northampton, England
- Position: Left back

Senior career*
| Years | Team | Apps | (Gls) |
- Hebburn Argyle
- Wallsend Park Villa
| 1910–1912 | Preston North End | 6 | |
| 1912–1913 | Watford | | |
| 1913–1919 | Sheffield United | 73 | (0) |
| 1919–1921 | Darlington | | |
| Total | | 79 | (0) |

Managerial career
- 1919–1928: Darlington
- 1928–1931: Nelson
- 1931–1935: Northampton Town
- 1935–1939: Exeter City
- 1945–1946: Darlington
- * Club domestic league appearances and goals

John Cogal English (13 December 1886 – 21 January 1953) was an English footballer and manager who played for Hebburn Argyle, Preston, Watford and Sheffield United. He played as a left-back and was judged to be the finest in the League in 1915.

== Club career ==
Born in Hebburn, County Durham, English started playing with Hebburn Argyle. He then went on to play for Preston and Watford, before being sold to Sheffield United for a fee of £500 in April 1913. He was a member of the Blades team who won the FA Cup final in 1915.

He left the Blades after refusing to re-sign following World War I and joined Darlington in 1919 as player-manager, retiring from playing in 1921 but remaining as manager for a further seven years. He went on to manage Nelson, before moving to Northampton Town, resigning from that post in March 1935. He later managed Exeter City.

== International career ==
Jack English was selected to play for England against Wales in 1914 but his club would not release him.

== Honours ==
Sheffield United

- FA Cup: 1914–15
