= Harry Pantling =

English footballer

Personal information
- Full name: Harold Pantling
- Date of birth: 16 May 1891
- Place of birth: Leighton Buzzard, England
- Date of death: 21 December 1952 (aged 61)
- Place of death: Sheffield, England
- Height: 5 ft 8 1/2 in (1.74 m)
- Position: Defender

Senior career*
Years	Team	Apps	(Gls)
1908–1914	Watford		
1914–1926	Sheffield United	224	(1)
1926–1927	Rotherham United		
1927–?	Heanor Town		

International career
1923	England	1	(0)
- * Club domestic league appearances and goals

Harold "Harry" Pantling (16 May 1891 – 21 December 1952) was an English footballer.

== Career ==
Pantling played for Watford, Sheffield United and Rotherham United in the Football League. He also made one appearance for England. He was part of the 1925 FA Cup winning side in Sheffield United's 1–0 victory over Cardiff City at Wembley Stadium.

== Honours ==
Sheffield United

- FA Cup: 1924–25
