= Harold Gough =

English footballer

Personal information
- Date of birth: 21 December 1890
- Place of birth: Chesterfield, England
- Date of death: 16 June 1970 (aged 79)
- Height: 5 ft 10 in (1.78 m)
- Position: Goalkeeper

Senior career*
Years	Team	Apps	(Gls)
- Spital Olympic
19??–1910	Castleford Town		
1910–1911	Bradford Park Avenue	3	(0)
1911–1913	Castleford Town		
1913–1924	Sheffield United	242	(0)
1924–1925	Castleford Town		
1925–1926	Harrogate Town		
1926–1927	Oldham Athletic	4	(0)
1927–1928	Bolton Wanderers	4	(0)
1928–1930	Torquay United	56	(0)

International career
1921	England	1	(0)
- * Club domestic league appearances and goals

Harold C. Gough (21 December 1890 – 16 June 1970) was an English professional footballer who played as a goalkeeper, spending most of his career with Sheffield United and Torquay United. He made one appearance in goal for the England national team in 1921.

== Club career ==
Harry Gough was born in Chesterfield and played for non-league sides Spital Olympic and Castleford Town before joining Bradford Park Avenue in 1910 for a fee of £30. He played three games for Bradford before returning to Castleford Town.

In 1913 he moved to Sheffield United where over the next ten years he would make 242 league appearances and win an FA Cup winners' medal in 1915. This was the last major competition before football was suspended during World War I. At the end of the war, he returned to the Bramall Lane club. A decision to become a publican in Castleford broke the conditions of his contract and he was suspended for six months in the summer of 1924. His final game for United was a 2–0 County Cup Final victory over the Wednesday.

On the completion of his suspension in December 1924, he returned to Castleford Town, before moving to Harrogate the following year from where he joined Oldham Athletic in 1926. He played four times for Oldham, moving to Bolton Wanderers in 1927, playing four league games before joining Torquay United in the summer of 1928. He immediately dislodged Archie Bayes as Torquay's first choice goalkeeper, missing just three games in his first season. He played 17 times the following season, before losing his place to Bayes through injury, and retired at the end of the season. Harolds leg was sadly amputated in 1963 from unknowen causes.

== International career ==
Gough won his only full England international cap on 9 April 1921 against Scotland at Hampden Park, Scotland winning 3–0.

== Honours ==
Sheffield United

- FA Cup: 1914–15
