= 1914–15 FA Cup =

Tournament details
- Country: England; Wales

Final positions
- Champions: Sheffield United (3rd title)
- Runners-up: Chelsea

The 1914–15 FA Cup was the 44th season of the world's oldest association football competition, the Football Association Challenge Cup (more usually known as the FA Cup), and the last to be held before the cancellation of all football competitions due to World War I. Sheffield United won the competition for the third time, beating Chelsea 3–0 in the final at Old Trafford, Manchester.

Matches were scheduled to be played at the stadium of the team named first on the date specified for each round, which was always a Saturday. If scores were level after 90 minutes had been played, a replay would take place at the stadium of the second-named team later the same week. If the replayed match was drawn further replays would be held at neutral venues until a winner was determined. If scores were level after 90 minutes had been played in a replay, a 30-minute period of extra time would be played.

== Calendar ==
The format of the FA Cup for the season had two preliminary rounds, six qualifying rounds, four proper rounds, and the semi-finals and final.

Round	Date
Extra preliminary round	Saturday 12 September 1914
Preliminary round	Saturday 26 September 1914
First round qualifying	Saturday 10 October 1914
Second round qualifying	Saturday 24 October 1914
Third round qualifying	Saturday 7 November 1914
Fourth round qualifying	Saturday 21 November 1914
Fifth round qualifying	Saturday 5 December 1914
Sixth round qualifying	Saturday 19 December 1914
First round proper	Saturday 9 January 1915
Second round proper	Saturday 30 January 1915
Third round proper	Saturday 20 February 1915
Fourth round proper	Saturday 6 March 1915
Semi-finals	Saturday 27 March 1915
Final	Saturday 24 April 1915

== Qualifying rounds ==
Despite the Football Association re-introducing a sixth qualifying round in this season's competition, the early stages of the tournament were decimated by withdrawals and forfeits caused by wartime travel restrictions and the significant loss of playing personnel to front lines in Europe. In the final wash-up, more than 90 ties across the extra preliminary, preliminary and first qualifying rounds were not contested and recorded as walkovers or forfeits.

Ultimately, the 12 winning teams from the sixth qualifying round were Nottingham Forest, Glossop and Lincoln City from the Football League Second Division, along with non-league sides Swansea Town, Bristol Rovers, Rochdale, Croydon Common, Merthyr Town, South Shields, Luton Town, Goole Town and Darlington. Goole Town was appearing in the competition proper for the first time, while Nottingham Forest was required to participate in the qualifying rounds for the first time. Glossop was competing as a Football League team for the last time, being voted out of the Second Division at the end of the season, while Croydon Common would be the only club from the Football League or the Southern League First Division to be wound up before the resumption of full competitive football in 1919.

A former Football League member in Walsall was the most successful club from the extra preliminary round, defeating Willenhall Pickwick, Cannock Town, Hednesford Town, Cradley Heath St Luke's, Stoke and Wrexham before going out to Shrewsbury Town in the fifth qualifying round.

== First round proper ==
36 of the 40 clubs from the First and Second divisions joined the 12 clubs who came through the qualifying rounds. The other four sides, Lincoln City, Nottingham Forest, Glossop and Leicester Fosse were entered in the sixth qualifying round, with only Leicester going out at that stage after losing to Swansea Town.

Sixteen Southern League sides were given byes to the First Round to bring the total number of teams up to 64. These were:

Southampton Millwall Queens Park Rangers Crystal Palace	Swindon Town Plymouth Argyle Reading Portsmouth	Gillingham Cardiff City Norwich City Exeter City	Northampton Town Southend United West Ham United Brighton & Hove Albion

32 matches were scheduled to be played on Saturday, 9 January 1915. Six matches were drawn and went to replays in the following midweek fixture.

Tie no	Home team	Score	Away team	Date
1	Birmingham	2–2	Crystal Palace	9 January 1915
Replay	Birmingham	3–0	Crystal Palace	13 January 1915
2	Blackpool	1–2	Sheffield United	9 January 1915
3	Darlington	0–1	Bradford City	9 January 1915
4	Bristol City	2–0	Cardiff City	9 January 1915
5	Burnley	3–1	Huddersfield Town	9 January 1915
6	Bury	1–1	Plymouth Argyle	9 January 1915
Replay	Plymouth Argyle	1–2	Bury	13 January 1915
7	Liverpool	3–0	Stockport County	9 January 1915
8	Preston North End	0–0	Manchester City	9 January 1915
Replay	Manchester City	3–0	Preston North End	13 January 1915
9	Rochdale	2–0	Gillingham	9 January 1915
10	South Shields	1–2	Fulham	9 January 1915
11	Southampton	3–0	Luton Town	9 January 1915
12	Reading	0–1	Wolverhampton Wanderers	9 January 1915
13	Nottingham Forest	1–4	Norwich City	9 January 1915
14	Aston Villa	2–0	Exeter City	9 January 1915
15	The Wednesday	1–0	Manchester United	9 January 1915
16	Bolton Wanderers	2–1	Notts County	9 January 1915
17	Grimsby Town	0–3	Northampton Town	9 January 1915
18	Middlesbrough	9–3	Goole Town	9 January 1915
19	Derby County	1–2	Leeds City	9 January 1915
20	Everton	3–0	Barnsley	9 January 1915
21	Tottenham Hotspur	2–1	Sunderland	9 January 1915
22	Queens Park Rangers	2–1	Glossop	9 January 1915
23	Bristol Rovers	0–0	Southend United	16 January 1915
Replay	Southend United	3–0	Bristol Rovers	23 January 1915
24	West Ham United	2–2	Newcastle United	9 January 1915
Replay	Newcastle United	3–2	West Ham United	13 January 1915
25	Brighton & Hove Albion	2–1	Lincoln City	9 January 1915
26	Millwall	2–1	Clapton Orient	9 January 1915
27	Hull City	1–0	West Bromwich Albion	9 January 1915
28	Chelsea	1–1	Swindon Town	9 January 1915
Replay	Chelsea	5–2	Swindon Town	13 January 1915
29	Croydon Common	0–3	Oldham Athletic	9 January 1915
30	Bradford Park Avenue	1–0	Portsmouth	9 January 1915
31	Swansea Town	1–0	Blackburn Rovers	9 January 1915
32	Arsenal	3–0	Merthyr Town	9 January 1915

== Second round proper ==
The 16 Second Round matches were played on Saturday, 30 January 1915. Three matches were drawn, with the replays taking place in the following weekend fixture. One of these was again drawn, and a second replay was played, again at the following Saturday.

Tie no	Home team	Score	Away team	Date
1	Burnley	6–0	Southend United	30 January 1915
2	Bury	0–1	Bradford Park Avenue	30 January 1915
3	The Wednesday	2–0	Wolverhampton Wanderers	30 January 1915
4	Bolton Wanderers	0–0	Millwall	30 January 1915
Replay	Millwall	2–2	Bolton Wanderers	6 February 1915
Replay	Bolton Wanderers	4–1	Millwall	13 February 1915
5	Everton	4–0	Bristol City	30 January 1915
6	Sheffield United	1–0	Liverpool	30 January 1915
7	Newcastle United	1–1	Swansea Town	30 January 1915
Replay	Swansea Town	0–2	Newcastle United	6 February 1915
8	Manchester City	1–0	Aston Villa	30 January 1915
9	Queens Park Rangers	1–0	Leeds City	30 January 1915
10	Fulham	2–3	Southampton	30 January 1915
11	Brighton & Hove Albion	0–0	Birmingham	30 January 1915
Replay	Birmingham	3–0	Brighton & Hove Albion	6 February 1915
12	Norwich City	3–2	Tottenham Hotspur	30 January 1915
13	Bradford City	1–0	Middlesbrough	30 January 1915
14	Hull City	2–1	Northampton Town	30 January 1915
15	Oldham Athletic	3–0	Rochdale	30 January 1915
16	Chelsea	1–0	Arsenal	30 January 1915

== Third round proper ==
The eight Third Round matches were scheduled for Saturday, 20 February 1915. There were two replays, played the following week, of which one went to a second replay in the following midweek fixture.

Tie no	Home team	Score	Away team	Date
1	Birmingham	2–3	Oldham Athletic	20 February 1915
2	Southampton	2–2	Hull City	20 February 1915
Replay	Hull City	4–0	Southampton	27 February 1915
3	The Wednesday	1–2	Newcastle United	20 February 1915
4	Bolton Wanderers	2–1	Burnley	20 February 1915
5	Sheffield United	1–0	Bradford Park Avenue	20 February 1915
6	Manchester City	1–2	Chelsea	20 February 1915
7	Queens Park Rangers	1–2	Everton	20 February 1915
8	Bradford City	1–1	Norwich City	20 February 1915
Replay	Norwich City	0–0	Bradford City	27 February 1915
Replay	Bradford City	2–0	Norwich City	3 March 1915

== Fourth round proper ==
The four Fourth round matches were scheduled for Saturday, 6 March 1915. There were two replays, played a week later.

Tie no	Home team	Score	Away team	Date
1	Bolton Wanderers	4–2	Hull City	6 March 1915
2	Bradford City	0–2	Everton	6 March 1915
3	Oldham Athletic	0–0	Sheffield United	6 March 1915
Replay	Sheffield United	3–0	Oldham Athletic	13 March 1915
4	Chelsea	1–1	Newcastle United	6 March 1915
Replay	Newcastle United	0–1	Chelsea	13 March 1915

== Semi-finals ==
The semi-final matches were played on Saturday, 27 March 1915. Sheffield United and Chelsea won and went on to meet in the final.

27 March 1915
15:00

Sheffield United	2–1	Bolton Wanderers

Ewood Park, Blackburn

27 March 1915
15:00

Chelsea	2–0	Everton
Halse, Croal

Villa Park, Birmingham
Attendance: 20,000
Referee: H H Taylor (Altrincham)

== Final ==
The final took place on 24 April 1915 and was contested by Sheffield United and Chelsea. It was the last FA Cup final to be staged before competitive football was abandoned in Britain because of the First World War. The match was moved from its pre-war location of Crystal Palace in south London to Old Trafford in Manchester to avoid disruption to travel in and around London.

=== Match details ===
24 April 1915
15:00 BST

Sheffield United	3–0	Chelsea
Simmons 36'; Fazackerley 84'; Kitchen 88'

Old Trafford, Manchester
Attendance: 49,557
Referee: H. H. Taylor

Sheffield United	Chelsea

== See also ==
- FA Cup Final Results 1872-
