= 1915–16 Stoke F.C. season =

Stoke
1915–16 season
- Chairman: Mr E.Reynish
- Manager: Joe Schofield
- Stadium: Victoria Ground
- Lancashire Section Primary Competition: 8th
- Midland Section Secondary Competition: 4th
- Top goalscorer: Bob Whittingham (26)
- Highest home attendance: 14,000 vs Bolton Wanderers (5 February 1916)
- Lowest home attendance: 3,000 vs Various teams
Home colours

The 1915–16 season was Stoke's first season in the non-competitive War League.

With the start of World War I, all Football League football was cancelled. In its place were formed War Leagues, based on geographical lines rather than based on previous league placement. Stoke contested the Lancashire Section in the Principal Tournament, and the Southern Division of the Midland Section in the Subsidiary Tournament. However, none of these were considered to be competitive football, and thus their records are not recognised by the Football League.

== Season review ==
With Peter Hodge returning to his family in Scotland former club great, Joe Schofield returned to the club in 1915 as manager for the War-time seasons and with a number of first team players joining the army Stoke fielded a number of 'guest' players as did many other clubs. For the whole war Stoke played in the Lancashire section and in the 1915–16 season ended up in mid-table position of 8th while in the Midland Section Secondary Competition Stoke finished 4th. Stoke's best result was a 7–1 win over Chesterfield Town and guest forward Bob Whittingham was top scorer with 26 goals to his name.

== Final league table ==
=== Lancashire Section Primary Competition ===
Pos	Team	Pld	W	D	L	GF	GA	GAv	Pts
1	Manchester City	26	16	3	7	61	35	1.743	35
2	Burnley	26	14	5	7	71	43	1.651	33
3	Blackpool	26	14	3	9	54	41	1.317	31
4	Everton	25	15	0	10	59	42	1.405	30
5	Oldham Athletic	25	13	3	9	52	44	1.182	29
6	Liverpool	26	11	7	8	48	42	1.143	29
7	Stockport County	26	13	3	10	47	43	1.093	29
8	Stoke	26	10	7	9	43	46	0.935	27
9	Southport Central	26	9	6	11	41	41	1.000	24
10	Bury	26	10	3	13	46	52	0.885	23
11	Manchester United	26	7	8	11	41	51	0.804	22
12	Bolton Wanderers	26	9	3	14	48	65	0.738	21
13	Rochdale	26	7	5	14	34	56	0.607	19
14	Preston North End	26	4	2	20	23	67	0.343	10

=== Midland Section Secondary Competition ===
Pos	Team	Pld	W	D	L	GF	GA	GAv	Pts
1	Nottingham Forest	10	7	0	3	28	12	2.333	14
2	Notts County	10	5	3	2	16	12	1.333	13
3	Leicester Fosse	10	3	3	4	15	19	0.789	9
4	Stoke	10	4	0	6	21	18	1.167	8
5	Derby County	10	4	0	6	23	28	0.821	8
6	Chesterfield Town	10	3	2	5	15	29	0.517	8

== Results ==
Stoke's score comes first

=== Legend ===
Win	Draw	Loss

=== Lancashire Section Primary Competition ===
Match	Date	Opponent	Venue	Result	Attendance	Scorers
1	4 September 1915	Preston North End	H	3–1	6,000	Smith, Jones, Whittingham
2	11 September 1915	Stockport County	A	1–3	4,000	Smith
3	18 September 1915	Liverpool	H	2–2	8,000	Whittingham (2)
4	25 September 1915	Bury	H	3–2	7,000	Whittingham (2), Herbert
5	2 October 1915	Manchester United	H	0–0	6,500	
6	9 October 1915	Blackpool	A	1–1	4,000	Herbert
7	16 October 1915	Southport Central	H	2–0	3,000	Whittingham, Tempest
8	23 October 1915	Oldham Athletic	A	3–1	2,000	Whittingham (2), Herbert
9	30 October 1915	Everton	H	3–2	4,000	Whittingham, Smith, Hargreaves
10	6 November 1915	Bolton Wanderers	A	1–2	4,000	Smith
11	13 November 1915	Manchester City	H	1–0	7,000	Parker
12	20 November 1915	Rochdale	H	1–1	4,000	Whittingham
13	27 November 1915	Burnley	A	2–3	4,000	Whittingham, Hargreaves
14	4 December 1915	Preston North End	A	3–2	3,500	Whittingham (2), Ellis
15	11 December 1915	Stockport County	H	0–2	3,000	
16	18 December 1915	Liverpool	A	0–2	7,500	
17	25 December 1915	Bury	A	2–4	2,000	Herbert, Whittingham
18	1 January 1916	Manchester United	A	2–1	8,000	Hargreaves, Ellis
19	8 January 1916	Blackpool	H	3–1	7,500	Whittingham, Watkin (2)
20	15 January 1916	Southport Central	A	1–1	2,000	Whittingham
21	22 January 1916	Oldham Athletic	H	2–1	6,000	Whittingham (2)
22	29 January 1916	Everton	A	1–4	4,000	Whittingham (pen)
23	5 February 1916	Bolton Wanderers	H	1–1	14,000	Parker
24	12 February 1916	Manchester City	A	2–4	10,000	Own Goal, Ellis
25	19 February 1916	Rochdale	A	1–3	3,000	Whittingham
26	26 February 1916	Burnley	H	2–2	13,000	Whittingham, Smith

=== Midland Section Secondary Competition ===
Match	Date	Opponent	Venue	Result	Attendance	Scorers
1	4 March 1916	Chesterfield Town	A	0–3	2,000	
2	11 March 1916	Nottingham Forest	H	0–1	4,000	
3	18 March 1916	Leicester Fosse	A	1–2	7,500	Whittingham
4	25 March 1916	Notts County	H	3–0	6,000	Whittingham (2), Smith
5	1 April 1916	Derby County	A	2–4	4,000	Smith (2)
6	8 April 1916	Chesterfield Town	H	7–1	7,000	Herbert (3), Ellis, Turner, Boxley (2)
7	15 April 1916	Nottingham Forest	A	1–3	4,000	Morris
8	22 April 1916	Leicester Fosse	H	1–0	6,000	Own Goal
9	24 April 1916	Derby County	H	6–1	6,000	Own Goal, Whittingham (2), Herbert, Boxley, Harrison
10	29 April 1916	Notts County	A	0–3	4,000	

== Squad statistics ==
Pos.	Name	Matches	
Pos.	Name	Apps	Goals
GK	(England) Richard Herron	36	0
DF	(England) G. Cameron	2	0
DF	(England) George Clarke	2	0
DF	(Wales) Albert Groves	2	0
DF	(England) Alec McClure	2	0
DF	(England) Alec Milne	1	0
DF	(England) George Smart	32	0
DF	(England) George Turner	36	1
DF	(England) Billy Twemlow	1	0
MF	(England) Frank Bentley	11	0
MF	(England) George Handley	2	0
MF	(England) Billy Harrison	7	1
MF	(Wales) Joe Jones	33	1
MF	(England) A. Morris	6	1
MF	(England) Charlie Parker	28	2
MF	(England) Jack Shelton	26	0
FW	(England) David Boxley	2	3
FW	(England) Billy Briscoe	2	0
FW	(England) Matthew Burton	1	0
FW	(England) S. Cooper	1	0
FW	(England) Albert Ellis	20	4
FW	(England) Reginald Forrester	1	0
FW	(England) Thomas Greaves	7	0
FW	(England) Henry Hargreaves	22	3
FW	(England) Billy Herbert	35	8
FW	(England) Jack Peart	1	0
FW	(England) Dick Smith	23	7
FW	(England) Billy Tempest	13	1
FW	(England) Billy Tompkinson	4	0
FW	(England) G. Ward	1	0
FW	(England) Arthur Watkin	3	2
FW	(England) Albert Whitehurst	1	0
FW	(England) Bob Whittingham	32	26
