= 1916–17 Stoke F.C. season =

Stoke
1916–17 season
- Chairman: Mr E.Reynish
- Manager: Joe Schofield
- Stadium: Victoria Ground
- Lancashire Section Primary Competition: 3rd
- Lancashire Section Secondary Competition Group D: 2nd
- Top goalscorer: Bob Whittingham (22)
- Highest home attendance: 14,500 vs Port Vale (21 April 1917)
- Lowest home attendance: 2,000 vs Various teams
Home colours

The 1916–17 season was Stoke's second season in the non-competitive War League.

With the start of World War I, all Football League football was cancelled. In its place were formed War Leagues, based on geographical lines rather than based on previous league placement. Stoke contested the Lancashire Section in the Principal Tournament, and the Lancashire Section Secondary Competition Group D. However, none of these were considered to be competitive football, and thus their records are not recognised by the Football League.

== Season review ==
In the Primary Competition of the Lancashire League Stoke finished in 3rd place with 39 points whilst in the Secondary Competition they finished 2nd with 6 points. During this season the lowest ever attendance was recorded for a Stoke first team match when 394 people saw Stoke play Oldham Athletic at Boundary Park in October 1916. Stoke's best victory in the 1916–17 season was a 7–0 over Bolton Wanderers which was sweet revenge after they had beaten Stoke 9–2 earlier in the season.

== Final league table ==
=== Lancashire Section Primary Competition ===
Pos	Team	Pld	W	D	L	GF	GA	GAv	Pts
1	Liverpool	30	19	8	3	62	26	2.385	46
2	Stockport County	30	18	7	5	61	31	1.968	43
3	Stoke	30	16	7	7	64	36	1.778	39
4	Manchester City	30	14	9	7	49	29	1.690	37
5	Everton	30	15	7	8	62	41	1.512	37
6	Burnley	30	15	4	11	73	56	1.304	34
7	Manchester United	30	13	6	11	48	54	0.889	32
8	Rochdale	30	12	5	13	47	54	0.870	29
9	Southport Central	30	10	8	12	40	43	0.930	28
10	Bolton Wanderers	30	9	6	15	59	65	0.908	24
11	Blackburn Rovers	30	10	4	16	52	66	0.788	24
12	Preston North End	30	8	7	15	47	65	0.723	23
13	Bury	30	7	8	15	40	63	0.635	22
14	Oldham Athletic	30	8	6	16	36	65	0.554	22
15	Port Vale	30	7	7	16	50	60	0.833	21
16	Blackpool	30	6	7	17	44	80	0.550	19

Source: rsssf.com

=== Lancashire Section Secondary Competition Group D ===
Pos	Team	Pld	W	D	L	GF	GA	GAv	Pts
1	Manchester United	6	4	0	2	15	9	1.667	8
2	Stoke	6	3	0	3	11	6	1.833	6
3	Port Vale	6	2	1	3	9	12	0.750	5
4	Manchester City	6	2	1	3	3	11	0.273	5

Source: rsssf.com

== Results ==
Stoke's score comes first

=== Legend ===
Win	Draw	Loss

=== Lancashire Section Primary Competition ===
Match	Date	Opponent	Venue	Result	Attendance	Scorers
1	2 September 1916	Manchester City	H	1–0	6,000	Ellis
2	9 September 1916	Everton	A	1–1	14,000	Bridgett
3	16 September 1916	Rochdale	H	1–1	5,000	Turner
4	23 September 1916	Bolton Wanderers	A	2–9	10,000	Bridgett (2)
5	30 September 1916	Port Vale	H	0–0	10,000	
6	7 October 1916	Oldham Athletic	A	1–1	394	Herbert
7	14 October 1916	Preston North End	H	2–0	3,000	Herbert (2)
8	21 October 1916	Burnley	A	1–4	3,00	Herbert
9	28 October 1916	Manchester United	H	3–0	5,000	Herbert, Bridgett, Jones
10	4 November 1916	Liverpool	A	1–3	12,000	Turner
11	11 November 1916	Stockport County	H	2–0	3,000	Bridgett, Humphries
12	18 November 1916	Bury	A	3–0	2,000	Jones, Herbert, Howell
13	25 November 1916	Blackpool	A	1–1	3,000	Humphries
14	2 December 1916	Southport Central	H	2–1	2,000	Herbert, Bridgett
15	9 December 1916	Blackburn Rovers	A	1–1	3,000	Howell
16	23 December 1916	Everton	H	0–2	5,000	
17	25 December 1916	Manchester City	A	0–1	12,000	
18	30 December 1916	Rochdale	A	1–0	2,000	Bridgett
19	6 January 1917	Bolton Wanderers	H	7–0	2,500	Whittingham (2), Howell (2), Herbert (2), Parker
20	13 January 1917	Port Vale	A	2–1	10,000	Whittingham, Harrison
21	20 January 1917	Oldham Athletic	H	4–0	2,000	Whittingham (2), Bridgett, Own Goal
22	27 January 1917	Preston North End	A	1–1	3,000	Limer
23	3 February 1917	Burnley	H	6–0	5,000	Whittingham (4), Herbert, Harrison
24	10 February 1917	Manchester United	A	2–4	7,000	Howell (2)
25	17 February 1917	Liverpool	H	1–0	12,000	Whittingham
26	24 February 1917	Stockport County	A	1–2	4,500	Own Goal
27	3 March 1917	Bury	H	5–2	5,000	Whittingham (2), Bridgett (2), Howell
28	10 March 1917	Blackpool	H	6–0	6,000	Whittingham (2), Howell (2), Herbert, Harrison
29	17 March 1917	Southport Central	A	2–0	2,500	Whittingham (2)
30	24 March 1917	Blackburn Rovers	H	4–1	4,000	Whittingham (2), Harrison (2)

=== Lancashire Section Secondary Competition Group D ===
Match	Date	Opponent	Venue	Result	Attendance	Scorers
1	31 March 1917	Manchester United	H	2–1	7,000	Whittingham, Howell
2	6 April 1917	Manchester City	A	0–1	12,000	
3	7 April 1917	Port Vale	A	2–3	12,000	Whittingham (2)
4	9 April 1917	Manchester City	H	5–0	8,000	Whittingham, Bridgett, Howell (3)
5	14 April 1917	Manchester United	A	0–1	9,000	
6	21 April 1917	Port Vale	H	2–0	14,000	Herbert, Howell

== Squad statistics ==
Pos.	Name	Matches	
Pos.	Name	Apps	Goals
GK	(England) Richard Herron	36	0
DF	(England) Arthur Allman	25	0
DF	(England) Alec Milne	5	0
DF	(England) Jack Maddock	3	0
DF	(England) George Turner	35	2
DF	(England) Billy Twemlow	6	0
MF	(England) Sammy Brooks	3	0
MF	(England) George Dobson	23	0
MF	(Wales) Joe Jones	34	2
MF	(England) Tom Kinson	2	0
MF	(England) George Limer	17	1
MF	(Scotland) R. McCarthy	4	0
MF	(England) A. Morris	1	0
MF	(England) Charlie Parker	32	1
FW	(England) J. Bridgett	25	11
FW	(England) Albert Ellis	6	1
FW	(England) Thomas Greaves	2	0
FW	(England) Billy Harrison	31	5
FW	(England) Billy Herbert	25	12
FW	(England) Harry Howell	26	14
FW	(England) Howard Humphries	6	2
FW	(England) Dick Smith	5	0
FW	(England) Billy Tempest	1	0
FW	(England) Eli Turner	6	0
FW	(England) Arthur Watkin	1	0
FW	(England) Bob Whittingham	18	22
