= 1917–18 Stoke F.C. season =

Stoke
1917–18 season
- Chairman: Mr E.Reynish
- Manager: Joe Schofield
- Stadium: Victoria Ground
- Lancashire Section Primary Competition: 1st
- Lancashire Section Secondary Competition Group B: 3rd
- Top goalscorer: Billy Herbert (32)
- Highest home attendance: 25,000 vs Liverpool (9 March 1918)
- Lowest home attendance: 4,000 vs Various teams
Home colours

The 1917–18 season was Stoke's third season in the War-time League.

With the start of World War I, all Football League football was cancelled. In its place were formed War Leagues, based on geographical lines rather than based on previous league placement. Stoke contested the Lancashire Section in the Principal Tournament, and the Lancashire Section Secondary Competition Group B. However, none of these were considered to be competitive football, and thus their records are not recognised by the Football League.

== Season review ==
In the Primary Competition of the Lancashire League Stoke finished in 1st place with 48 points whilst in the Secondary Competition they finished 3rd with 6 points. Stoke were in free scoring form this season amassing 106 goals including a 16–0 win over Blackburn Rovers this was followed up by an 8–1 win over Rovers a week later. Stoke also beat teams 9–0 (Burnley), 7–0 (Oldham), 6–0 (Port Vale). Stoke won the Primary Competition and thus competed in the championship decider against Leeds City over two legs. However Leeds won 2–1. Both matches against Leeds drew impressive crowds and gate receipts totalled £918 which went to the National Footballers' War Fund.

== Final league table ==
=== Lancashire Section Primary Competition ===
Pos	Team	Pld	W	D	L	GF	GA	GAv	Pts
1	Stoke	30	22	4	4	109	27	4.037	48
2	Liverpool	30	21	6	3	101	26	3.885	48
3	Everton	30	19	6	5	92	36	2.556	44
4	Manchester City	30	15	8	7	57	28	2.036	38
5	Stockport County	30	17	3	10	59	32	1.844	37
6	Rochdale	30	14	9	7	78	51	1.529	37
7	Bolton Wanderers	30	13	4	13	68	70	0.971	30
8	Manchester United	30	11	8	11	45	49	0.918	30
9	Oldham Athletic	30	11	6	13	50	59	0.847	28
10	Preston North End	30	12	3	15	38	53	0.717	27
11	Port Vale	30	9	8	13	47	58	0.810	26
12	Blackpool	30	9	7	14	46	70	0.657	25
13	Southport Central	30	8	6	16	33	69	0.478	22
14	Bury	30	8	5	17	46	64	0.719	21
15	Burnley	30	5	4	21	32	104	0.308	14
16	Blackburn Rovers	30	2	1	27	22	127	0.173	5

=== Lancashire Section Secondary Competition Group B ===
Pos	Team	Pld	W	D	L	GF	GA	GAv	Pts
1	Manchester City	6	4	1	1	11	4	2.750	9
2	Manchester United	6	3	1	2	6	7	0.857	7
3	Stoke	6	2	2	2	10	5	2.000	6
4	Port Vale	6	1	0	5	4	15	0.267	2

== Results ==
Stoke's score comes first

=== Legend ===
Win	Draw	Loss

=== Lancashire Section Primary Competition ===
Match	Date	Opponent	Venue	Result	Attendance	Scorers
1	1 September 1917	Bolton Wanderers	A	5–2	6,000	Howell (2), Bridgett, Whittingham (2)
2	8 September 1917	Bolton Wanderers	H	6–2	7,000	Howell (2), Bridgett, Whittingham, Herbert (2)
3	15 September 1917	Preston North End	A	3–2	5,000	Howell, Whittingham, Herbert
4	22 September 1917	Preston North End	H	4–0	8,000	Howell, Herbert, Bridgett, Jones
5	29 September 1917	Port Vale	A	2–0	10,000	Herbert, Whittingham
6	6 October 1917	Port Vale	H	4–1	8,000	Herbert, Whittingham (2), Howell
7	13 October 1917	Blackpool	A	5–0	4,000	Harrison, Herbert (2), Howell (2)
8	20 October 1917	Blackpool	H	3–1	7,000	Howell, Whittingham, Parker
9	27 October 1917	Manchester City	H	4–3	9,000	Herbert, Watkin (2), Turner
10	3 November 1917	Manchester City	A	0–1	20,000	
11	10 November 1917	Blackburn Rovers	H	16–0	8,000	Whittingham (4), Turner (4), Herbert (3), Parker (2), Harrison, Bridgett, Jones
12	17 November 1917	Blackburn Rovers	A	8–1	4,000	Whittingham (2), Herbert, Howell (2), Jones, Bridgett (2)
13	1 December 1917	Rochdale	A	0–0	4,000	
14	8 December 1917	Everton	H	3–0	8,000	Bridgett (2), Howell
15	15 December 1917	Everton	A	2–3	10,000	Bridgett, Whittingham
16	22 December 1917	Bury	H	1–0	5,000	Howell
17	29 December 1917	Bury	A	1–1	4,000	P. Jones
18	5 January 1918	Oldham Athletic	H	7–0	5,000	Herbert (4), Howell (2), Martin
19	12 January 1918	Oldham Athletic	A	2–2	3,000	Herbert, Howell
20	19 January 1918	Stockport County	H	2–1	4,000	Herbert, Howell
21	21 January 1918	Stockport County	A	3–0	3,000	Martin, Jones, Smith
22	2 February 1918	Manchester United	H	5–1	6,000	Bridgett, Parker, Herbert, Howell (2)
23	9 February 1918	Manchester United	A	1–2	10,000	Harrison
24	16 February 1918	Southport Central	A	2–0	3,000	Howell, Turner
25	23 February 1918	Southport Central	H	4–0	4,000	Turner, Lockett, Herbert, Jones
26	2 March 1918	Liverpool	A	1–1	22,000	Howell
27	9 March 1918	Liverpool	H	3–1	25,000	Howell (2), Bridgett
28	16 March 1918	Burnley	H	9–0	16,000	Herbert (2), Bridgett, Howell (3), Parker, Lockett, Harrison
29	23 March 1918	Burnley	A	2–0	4,000	Howell, Lockett
30	27 April 1918	Rochdale	H	1–2	6,000	Jones

=== Lancashire Section Secondary Competition Group B ===
Match	Date	Opponent	Venue	Result	Attendance	Scorers
1	29 March 1918	Port Vale	A	2–1	7,000	Herbert, P. Jones
2	30 March 1918	Manchester United	A	1–2	11,000	Jones
3	1 April 1918	Port Vale	H	6–0	12,000	Herbert (3), Lockett, Bassett (2)
4	6 April 1918	Manchester United	H	0–0	8,000	
5	13 April 1918	Manchester City	H	1–1	9,000	Herbert
6	20 April 1918	Manchester City	A	0–2	11,000	

=== Championship Decider ===
Match	Date	Opponent	Venue	Result	Attendance	Scorers
1st leg	4 May 1918	Leeds City	A	0–2	15,000	
2nd leg	11 May 1918	Leeds City	H	1–0	14,000	Parker

== Squad statistics ==
Pos.	Name	Matches	
Pos.	Name	Apps	Goals
GK	(England) Richard Herron	2	0
GK	(England) A. Morns	5	0
GK	(England) Teddy Peers	31	0
DF	(England) Arthur Allman	5	0
DF	(England) Jack Maddock	23	0
DF	(England) Alec Milne	4	0
DF	(England) George Turner	1	0
DF	(England) Billy Twemlow	37	0
DF	(England) Harry Wootton	1	0
MF	(Wales) Joe Jones	38	6
MF	(England) Charlie Parker	38	6
MF	(England) Dick Smith	32	1
FW	(England) G. Bassett	4	2
FW	(England) J. Bridgett	24	10
FW	(England) Billy Briscoe	1	0
FW	(England) S. Connor	1	0
FW	(England) S. Cooper	1	0
FW	(England) Thomas Greaves	2	0
FW	(England) Billy Harrison	33	4
FW	(England) Billy Herbert	38	32
FW	(England) Harry Howell	31	28
FW	(England) P. Jones	3	2
FW	(England) Aaron Lockett	9	5
FW	(England) James Martin	9	3
FW	(Scotland) G. McGregor	1	0
FW	(England) Billy Tempest	1	0
FW	(England) Eli Turner	13	9
FW	(England) Arthur Watkin	3	2
FW	(England) Bob Whittingham	17	15
