= Billy Tempest =

English footballer (1893-1945)

Personal information
- Full name: William Tempest
- Date of birth: 8 January 1893
- Place of birth: Stoke-upon-Trent, England
- Date of death: 1945 (aged 51–52)
- Place of death: Stoke-on-Trent, England
- Height: 5 ft 6 in (1.68 m)
- Position: Left winger

Youth career
- Trentham

Senior career*
| Years | Team | Apps | (Gls) |
| 1910–1911 | Huddersfield Town | 0 | (0) |
| 1911–1912 | Trentham | | |
| 1912–1924 | Stoke | 202 | (29) |
| 1924–1926 | Port Vale | 45 | (3) |
| Total | | 247 | (32) |
- * Club domestic league appearances and goals

William Tempest (8 January 1893 – 1945) was an English footballer who played on the left-wing. He played for Stoke between 1912 and 1924 before finishing his career in 1926 with Port Vale.

== Career ==
Tempest played for Trentham in two spells around a spell as a professional at Huddersfield Town in the 1910–11 season, the club's first in the Football League. However, he never made his debut at Leeds Road. He signed with Stoke in 1912. He played four games in 1912–13, as Stoke were relegated after finishing bottom of the Southern League Division One. He scored his first goal at the Victoria Ground in a 2–0 win over Newport County, making 11 appearances in 1913–14. He hit six goals in 28 games in 1914–15, helping the club to the Southern League Division Two title with his accurate crosses to the free-scoring Arthur Watkin. He remained with the club throughout World War I, playing 13 games in 1915–16, one game in 1916–17 and 1917–18, and nine games in 1918–19. He scored one goal in 36 Second Division games in 1919–20. Tempest then hit ten goals in 38 appearances in 1920–21, before helping Stoke to achieve promotion with nine goals in 46 appearances in 1921–22. He scored two goals in 20 First Division games in 1922–23, as the club were relegated straight back out of the top-flight; Tempest missed the end of season run-in with a broken collarbone. He scored against Manchester United at both Old Trafford and in the return fixture in 1923–24, his only strikes of the campaign. However, he was made available for transfer after refusing to accept a new contract on lower pay. He was sold to local rivals Port Vale for £1,000 in June 1924. He was a regular feature in the 1924–25 season, scoring against Stoke in a 2–0 win at the Old Recreation Ground on 24 January. However, he suffered an injury in December 1925 and was forced to retire after the 1925–26 season.

== Style of play ==
A slight figure at just 5 ft 4 in (1.63 m) tall, Tempest used his pace to beat opposing full-backs. The Sentinel described his "graceful progression, an immobile body being borne along on a very mobile pair of legs. He used to have a knack of taking the ball very cleverly across the toes of the man who tackled him and another characteristic of his play is to double back and centre with his right."

== Career statistics ==
Appearances and goals by club, season and competition
| Club | Season | League | | | FA Cup | | Total | |
| Club | Season | Division | Apps | Goals | Apps | Goals | Apps | Goals |
|---|---|---|---|---|---|---|---|---|
| Stoke | 1912–13 | Southern Division One | 5 | 0 | 0 | 0 | 5 | 0 |
| Stoke | 1913–14 | Southern Division Two | 10 | 1 | 1 | 0 | 11 | 1 |
| Stoke | 1914–15 | Southern Division Two | 24 | 6 | 4 | 0 | 28 | 6 |
| Stoke | 1919–20 | Second Division | 36 | 1 | 1 | 0 | 37 | 1 |
| Stoke | 1920–21 | Second Division | 37 | 10 | 1 | 0 | 38 | 10 |
| Stoke | 1921–22 | Second Division | 41 | 7 | 5 | 2 | 46 | 9 |
| Stoke | 1922–23 | First Division | 20 | 2 | 2 | 0 | 22 | 2 |
| Stoke | 1923–24 | Second Division | 29 | 2 | 1 | 0 | 30 | 2 |
| Stoke | Total | | 202 | 29 | 15 | 2 | 217 | 31 |
| Port Vale | 1924–25 | Second Division | 29 | 1 | 0 | 0 | 29 | 1 |
| Port Vale | 1925–26 | Second Division | 16 | 2 | 0 | 0 | 16 | 2 |
| Port Vale | Total | | 45 | 3 | 0 | 0 | 45 | 3 |
| Career total | | | 247 | 32 | 15 | 2 | 262 | 34 |

== Honours ==
Stoke

- Southern League Division Two: 1914–15
- Football League Second Divisionsecond-place promotion: 1921–22
