= Dickie Smith =

English footballer

Personal information
- Full name: Richard Smith
- Date of birth: April 1890
- Place of birth: Newcastle-Under-Lyme, England
- Date of death: 1940
- Position: Half-back

Senior career*
Years	Team	Apps	(Gls)
1913	Newcastle Town		
1914–1915	Crewe Alexandra	0	(0)
1919–1922	Stoke	107	(2)
- * Club domestic league appearances and goals

Richard Smith (April 1890 – 1940) was an English footballer who played in the Football League for Stoke. He made one hundred and nine appearances for Stoke.

== Career ==
After starting his career with Newcastle Town and Crewe Alexandra, Smith signed for Stoke in 1916 during the war-time season when he was free of army duty. He made his mark during the following season in the 1917–18 season, appearing in 32 regional games, and adding 28 to his tally the following term. When peacetime football returned in 1919 he was regarded as a key member of the first team and went on to make just over 100 league appearances for the "Potters" in three seasons before retiring due to injury in 1922.

== Career statistics ==
Appearances and goals by club, season and competition
Club	Season	League			FA Cup		Total	
Club	Season	Division	Apps	Goals	Apps	Goals	Apps	Goals
Stoke	1919–20	Second Division	33	1	0	0	33	1
Stoke	1920–21	Second Division	38	1	1	0	39	1
Stoke	1921–22	Second Division	35	0	2	0	37	0
Stoke	1922–23	First Division	1	0	0	0	1	0
Career total			107	2	3	0	110	2
