= Harry Crossthwaite =

English footballer

Personal information
- Full name: Harold Crossthwaite
- Date of birth: 9 September 1890
- Place of birth: Stockport, England
- Date of death: November 1939 (aged 49)
- Place of death: Stockport, England
- Height: 5 ft 7 in (1.70 m)
- Position: Outside right

Senior career*
| Years | Team | Apps | (Gls) |
| 1911 | Heywood United | | |
| 1912–1919 | Stockport County | 75 | (7) |
| 1920–1921 | Stoke | 30 | (0) |
| 1921–1922 | Stockport County | 52 | (4) |
| 1923 | Stalybridge Celtic | | |
| Total | | 157 | (11) |
- * Club domestic league appearances and goals

Harold Crossthwaite (9 September 1890 – November 1939) was an English footballer who played in the Football League for Stockport County and Stoke. His nephew Bert was also a footballer.

== Career ==
Crossthwaite was born in Stockport and played amateur football with Heywood United before he joined local League side Stockport County in 1912. County struggled in the Second Division up until World War I broke out. Crossthwaite continued to play for the club during the war and back in 1919 once League football and been resumed. There was no change in the "Hatters" fortunes on the pitch and with the side languishing in the lower reaches of the table he signed for divisional rivals Stoke in March 1920. He made his debut for Stoke in the first league Potteries derby match against Port Vale and assisted goalscorer Arthur Watkin as Stoke won 3–0 at Vale's Old Recreation Ground. However Stoke had a disappointing end to the 1919–20 season and finished in mid-table. Crossthwaite started the 1920–21 as first choice right winger playing in 19 matches but after a poor performance against Birmingham he was dropped and at the end of the season he was sold back to Stockport County. In his first season back at Edgeley Park he helped Stockport to win the Football League Third Division North title. He spent one more season at Stockport before ending his career with Stalybridge Celtic.

== Personal life ==
Crossthwaite resided in Heaton Norris, Stockport. In November 1939, he was struck by a lorry and killed as he crossed the street in Stockport.

== Career statistics ==
Appearances and goals by club, season and competition
| Club | Season | League | | | FA Cup | | Total | |
| Club | Season | Division | Apps | Goals | Apps | Goals | Apps | Goals |
|---|---|---|---|---|---|---|---|---|
| Stockport County | 1912–13 | Second Division | 20 | 2 | 1 | 0 | 21 | 2 |
| Stockport County | 1913–14 | Second Division | 10 | 0 | 1 | 0 | 11 | 0 |
| Stockport County | 1914–15 | Second Division | 16 | 2 | 0 | 0 | 16 | 2 |
| Stockport County | 1919–20 | Second Division | 29 | 3 | 1 | 0 | 24 | 3 |
| Stockport County | Total | | 75 | 7 | 3 | 0 | 78 | 7 |
| Stoke | 1919–20 | Second Division | 12 | 0 | 0 | 0 | 12 | 0 |
| Stoke | 1920–21 | Second Division | 18 | 0 | 1 | 0 | 19 | 0 |
| Stoke | Total | | 30 | 0 | 1 | 0 | 31 | 0 |
| Stockport County | 1921–22 | Third Division North | 34 | 2 | 1 | 0 | 35 | 2 |
| Stockport County | 1922–23 | Second Division | 18 | 2 | 0 | 0 | 18 | 2 |
| Stockport County | Total | | 52 | 4 | 1 | 0 | 53 | 4 |
| Career total | | | 157 | 11 | 5 | 0 | 163 | 11 |

== Honours ==
Stockport County

- Football League Third Division North champions: 1921–22
