= 1919–20 Stoke F.C. season =

Stoke
1919–20 season
- Chairman: Mr E.Reynish
- Manager: Arthur Shallcross
- Stadium: Victoria Ground
- Football League Second Division: 10th (42 Points)
- FA Cup: First Round
- Top goalscorer: League: David Brown (13); All: David Brown (13)
- Highest home attendance: 30,000 vs Birmingham (6 December 1919)
- Lowest home attendance: 5,000 vs South Shields (24 April 1920)
- Average home league attendance: 12,145
Home colours

The 1919–20 season was Stoke's 20th season in the Football League and the second in the Second Division.

With the country back to normal after the hostilities in Europe, a full league programme was restored for the 1919–20 season and Stoke were able to take their place back in the Football League since 1908. Stoke had an up and down season as they went on runs of victories and then runs of defeats and unsurprisingly finished in a mid table position of 10th. The 1919–20 season also saw the Potteries derby become a league fixture as local club Port Vale were elected into the football league due to the expulsion of Leeds City. Stoke won the first league meeting between the two clubs 3–0 at Vale's Old Recreation Ground.

== Season review ==
=== League ===
During the war Stoke had some success as they impressed in the Lancashire section of the war league. There was of course sadness as seven players died fighting in the war. These were goalkeeper Richard Herron, half-backs Henry Hargreaves and Stan Ripley and reserve team players George Limer, Jack Shorthouse, Tom Kinson and Bill Nixon. Stoke's exploits in the War-League not only brought prestige and standing, but also swelled the coffers to the extent of financial stability. It was hoped that the club was set for a bright future and, with virtually everyone retained who had acquitted themselves so well in the war period, promotion was the target. Two Scottish players George Jarvis (from Celtic) and Jock Stirling (from Bradford Park Avenue) joined the forward ranks, whilst goalkeeper Tom Kay became first choice keeper and would go on to make 70 successive appearances.

The 1919–20 season opened well with good sized crowds being entertained by a winning team. Stoke collected maximum points in eleven of the first 15 matches and they only failed to score in one. Bob Whittingham, who had been such a stalwart during the war, rejoined the club on a permanent transfer from Chelsea and at the same time (October) David Brown arrived from Dundee to give Stoke's forward line an impressive look. But amazingly and completely out of context, Stoke's fortunes took a dramatic turn as they lost the next five matches. The team did manage to recover and in the end finished in 10th spot. A mid-table position was acceptable since the club had sought, initially, to consolidate its position in the Second Division. But the supporters were disappointed with the end result after such a good start to the season.

=== FA Cup ===
Fellow Second Division side Bury defeated Stoke in the first round 2–0.

== Final league table ==
Pos	Team	Pld	W	D	L	GF	GA	GAv	Pts
8	Bristol City	42	13	17	12	46	43	1.070	43
9	South Shields	42	15	12	15	58	48	1.208	42
10	Stoke	42	18	6	18	60	54	1.111	42
11	Hull City	42	18	6	18	78	72	1.083	42
12	Barnsley	42	15	10	17	61	55	1.109	40

== Results ==
Stoke's score comes first

=== Legend ===
Win	Draw	Loss

=== Football League Second Division ===
Match	Date	Opponent	Venue	Result	Attendance	Scorers
1	30 August 1919	Barnsley	H	2–0	12,000	Jarvis (2)
2	1 September 1919	Hull City	A	0–3	8,000	
3	6 September 1919	Barnsley	A	2–1	7,000	Jarvis, Tempest
4	8 September 1919	Hull City	H	3–1	10,000	Jarvis (2), Maddock (pen)
5	13 September 1919	Blackpool	H	2–0	9,000	Smith, Boxley
6	20 September 1919	Blackpool	A	1–3	6,000	Herbert
7	27 September 1919	West Ham United	H	2–1	10,000	Herbert (2)
8	4 October 1919	West Ham United	A	1–1	20,000	Phillips
9	11 October 1919	Stockport County	H	2–1	8,000	Clarke, Stirling
10	18 October 1919	Stockport County	A	1–3	7,000	Boxley
11	25 October 1919	Rotherham County	H	3–0	5,000	Jarvis (2), Jones
12	1 November 1919	Rotherham County	A	3–1	12,000	Jarvis, Brown (2)
13	15 November 1919	Bristol City	A	2–1	6,000	Parker, Whittingham
14	17 November 1919	Bristol City	H	2–0	8,000	Whittingham, Twemlow (pen)
15	22 November 1919	Grimsby Town	H	3–0	5,000	Jones (2), Jarvis
16	29 November 1919	Grimsby Town	A	0–2	4,000	
17	6 December 1919	Birmingham	H	0–1	30,000	
18	13 December 1919	Birmingham	A	1–2	40,000	Page
19	20 December 1919	Leicester City	A	1–3	19,641	Brown
20	25 December 1919	Coventry City	A	2–3	15,000	Brown, Whittingham
21	26 December 1919	Coventry City	H	6–1	20,000	Brown (2), Whittingham (2), Phillips (2)
22	27 December 1919	Leicester City	H	3–0	15,000	Brown (2), Whittingham
23	3 January 1920	Fulham	A	0–0	10,000	
24	17 January 1920	Fulham	H	1–0	7,000	Parker
25	24 January 1920	Nottingham Forest	H	0–2	8,000	
26	28 January 1920	Nottingham Forest	A	2–0	6,000	Brown, Martin
27	7 February 1920	Lincoln City	H	1–3	10,000	Whittingham
28	14 February 1920	Lincoln City	A	1–2	8,000	Jarvis
29	21 February 1920	Bury	H	1–1	12,000	Twemlow (pen)
30	28 February 1920	Bury	A	0–1	12,000	
31	6 March 1920	Port Vale	A	3–0	22,697	Whittingham, Brown, Watkin
32	13 March 1920	Port Vale	H	0–0	27,000	
33	20 March 1920	Clapton Orient	A	1–2	8,000	Brown
34	27 March 1920	Clapton Orient	H	2–0	18,000	Brown, Maddock (pen)
35	3 April 1920	Tottenham Hotspur	A	0–2	40,000	
36	5 April 1920	Huddersfield Town	H	0–1	20,000	
37	6 April 1920	Huddersfield Town	A	0–3	30,000	
38	10 April 1920	Tottenham Hotspur	H	1–3	10,000	Maddock (pen)
39	17 April 1920	South Shields	A	2–2	16,000	Watkin (2)
40	24 April 1920	South Shields	H	0–0	5,000	
41	26 April 1920	Wolverhampton Wanderers	A	0–4	12,000	
42	1 May 1920	Wolverhampton Wanderers	H	3–0	10,000	Brown, Boxley (2)

=== FA Cup ===
Round	Date	Opponent	Venue	Result	Attendance	Scorers
R1	10 January 1920	Bury	A	0–2	12,000	

== Squad statistics ==
Pos.	Name	League		FA Cup		Total	
Pos.	Name	Apps	Goals	Apps	Goals	Apps	Goals
GK	(England) Tom Kay	42	0	1	0	43	0
DF	(England) Percy Brooke	4	0	0	0	4	0
DF	(England) Jack Maddock	15	3	0	0	15	3
DF	(England) Alec Milne	30	0	1	0	31	0
DF	(England) George Smart	4	0	0	0	4	0
DF	(England) Billy Twemlow	33	2	1	0	34	2
MF	(England) George Clarke	30	1	1	0	31	1
MF	(Wales) Joe Jones	15	3	0	0	15	3
MF	(England) Charlie Parker	34	2	1	0	35	2
MF	(England) Dickie Smith	33	1	0	0	33	1
MF	(England) Harry Wootton	1	0	0	0	1	0
FW	(England) Tommy Bowyer	0	0	0	0	0	0
FW	(England) David Boxley	8	4	0	0	8	4
FW	(Scotland) David Brown	31	13	1	0	32	13
FW	(England) Matthew Burton	3	0	0	0	3	0
FW	(England) Bill Charnley	2	0	0	0	2	0
FW	(England) Harry Crossthwaite	12	0	0	0	12	0
FW	(England) Billy Herbert	11	3	0	0	11	3
FW	(Scotland) George Jarvis	30	10	1	0	31	10
FW	(England) James Martin	13	1	0	0	13	1
FW	(England) Louis Page	12	1	0	0	12	1
FW	(England) Wilf Phillips	13	3	1	0	14	3
FW	(Scotland) Jock Stirling	20	1	1	0	21	1
FW	(England) Billy Tempest	36	1	1	0	37	1
FW	(England) Billy Tompkinson	1	0	0	0	1	0
FW	(England) Arthur Watkin	11	3	1	0	12	3
FW	(England) Bob Whittingham	18	8	0	0	18	8
