= Percy Brooke =

English footballer

Personal information
- Full name: Percy Brooke
- Date of birth: 12 May 1893
- Place of birth: Kidsgrove, England
- Date of death: 1971 (aged 77–78)
- Place of death: Newcastle-under-Lyme, England
- Position: Full back

Senior career*
Years	Team	Apps	(Gls)
1912–1919	Kidsgrove Wellington		
1919–1920	Stoke	11	(0)
1921–1925	Aberdare Athletic	123	(0)
1926–1927	Swindon Town	3	(0)
1927–1928	Accrington Stanley	2	(0)
1929–1930	Whitchurch		
1930	Bromsgrove Rovers		
Total		139	(0)
- * Club domestic league appearances and goals

Percy Brooke (12 May 1893 – 1971) was an English footballer who played in the Football League for Aberdare Athletic, Accrington Stanley, Stoke City and Swindon Town.

== Career ==
Brooke's career began with his local side Kidsgrove Wellington, from whom he joined Stoke City, playing 11 times in league matches for Stoke in the 1919–20 and 1920–21 seasons. He left Stoke to join Aberdare Athletic, playing Aberdare's side in their first ever season in league football. He went on to make 123 league appearances for Aberdare before joining Swindon Town in 1926, making his Swindon debut in September 1926 in a 2–1 win at home to Bournemouth & Boscombe Athletic. He then dropped out of the side and only returned in April 1927 when he played in a 3–2 home win over his former side Aberdare (one of Aberdare's last games as a league side) and a 4–4 draw away to Gillingham. Brooke played twice for Accrington Stanley the following season before retiring from football.

== Career statistics ==
Appearances and goals by club, season and competition
Club	Season	League			FA Cup		Total	
Club	Season	Division	Apps	Goals	Apps	Goals	Apps	Goals
Stoke	1919–20	Second Division	4	0	0	0	4	0
Stoke	1920–21	Second Division	7	0	1	0	8	0
Stoke	Total		11	0	1	0	12	0
Aberdare Athletic	1921–22	Third Division South	36	0	0	0	36	0
Aberdare Athletic	1922–23	Third Division South	29	0	6	0	35	0
Aberdare Athletic	1923–24	Third Division South	14	0	0	0	14	0
Aberdare Athletic	1924–25	Third Division South	36	0	2	0	38	0
Aberdare Athletic	1925–26	Third Division South	8	0	0	0	8	0
Aberdare Athletic	Total		123	0	8	0	131	0
Swindon Town	1926–27	Third Division South	3	0	0	0	3	0
Accrington Stanley	1927–28	Third Division North	2	0	0	0	2	0
Career Total			139	0	9	0	148	0
