= Potteries derby =

Football rivalry in England

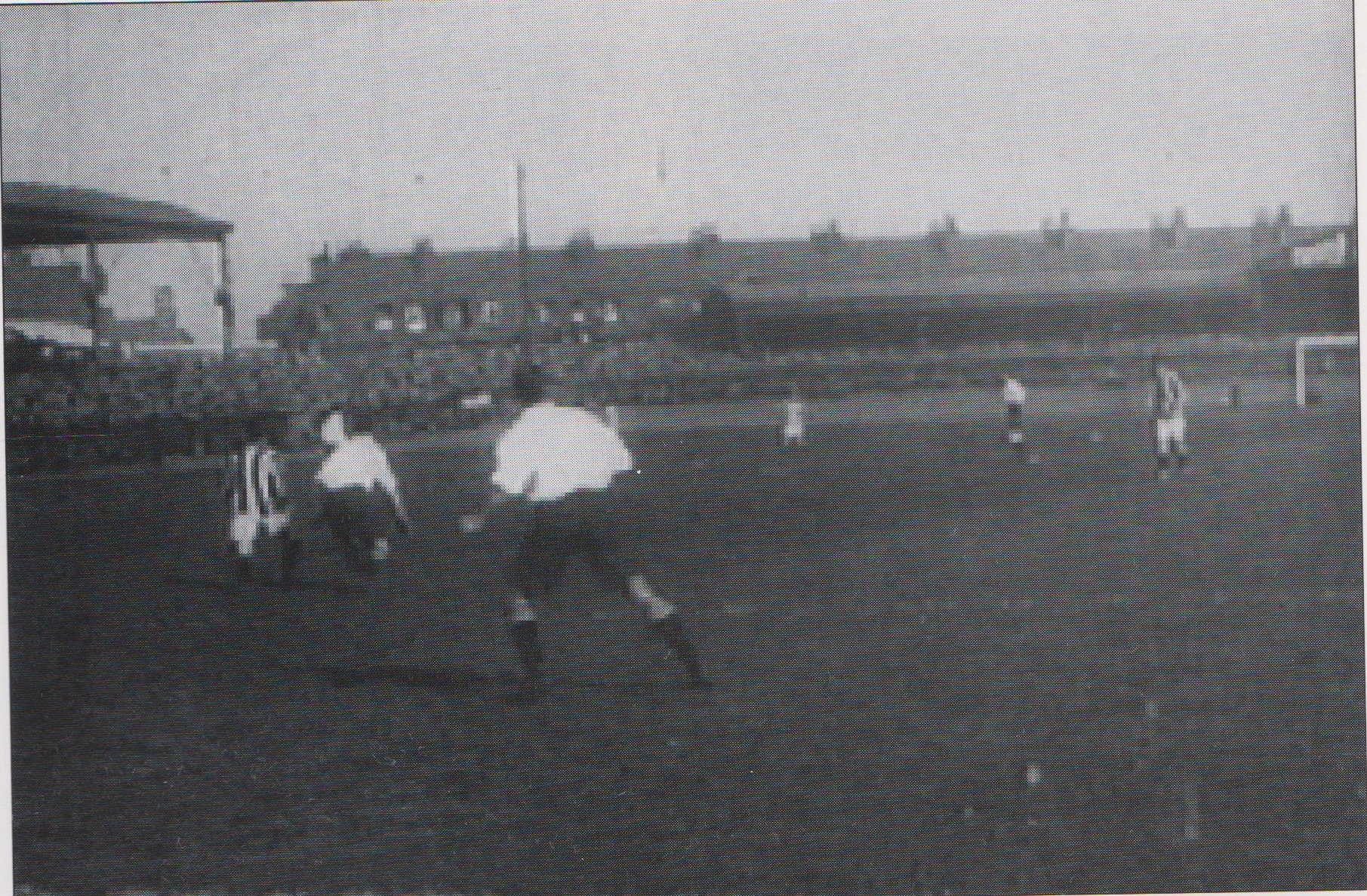
- The derby match played on 13 March 1920
- Sport: Association football
- Location: Stoke-on-Trent
- Teams: Port Vale; Stoke City
- First meeting: 2 December 1882; Stoke 1–0 Burslem Port Vale; Staffordshire Senior Cup
- Latest meeting: 10 February 2002; Stoke City 0–1 Port Vale; Football League Second Division
- Stadiums: Vale Park (Port Vale); Bet365 Stadium (Stoke City)

Statistics
- Total meetings: 92
- Most wins: Stoke City (40)
- Most player appearances: Bob McGrory (21)
- Top scorer: Arthur Watkin (10)
- All-time series: Port Vale: 26; Drawn: 26; Stoke: 40
- Largest victory: Port Vale 0–7 Stoke City (9 May 1932); North Staffordshire Infirmary Cup
- Largest goal scoring: Port Vale 3–5 Stoke (22 March 1884); Staffordshire Senior Cup; Stoke 5–3 Port Vale (6 October 1902); North Staffordshire Infirmary Cup
- Current win streak: Port Vale (1)
- Current unbeaten streak: Port Vale (6)

In English football, the Potteries derby is the local derby between the two major clubs in the city of Stoke-on-Trent – Port Vale and Stoke City, first contested in 1882. Port Vale plays at Vale Park whilst Stoke play at the bet365 Stadium, the two grounds are separated by roughly 4.3 miles (6.9 km). The fans of each club both consider the other to be their main rivals; this has led to a heated atmosphere at these matches. One study in 2019 ranked it as the joint-28th biggest rivalry in English professional football, level with the Manchester derby. The two teams have met in 92 competitive first-team fixtures, including 44 English Football League, six FA Cup and two Football League Trophy fixtures, with the remaining 40 meetings coming in regional cup competitions.

Since 1919, the two clubs have been in the same league for 22 seasons, with Vale finishing higher than Stoke in seven seasons. Stoke have spent most of their history playing in a higher division than Vale. Vale have had only five seasons playing at a higher level than Stoke.

Stoke-on-Trent is the least populous city to have two Football League clubs: Bradford, Cardiff, Coventry, Hull, Leeds, Leicester and Newcastle upon Tyne are all larger cities that contain just one league club. In terms of support, the northern towns of Burslem and Tunstall are Port Vale strongholds, whilst Stoke City enjoy greater support in the other four towns of the city (Fenton, Hanley, Longton and Stoke-upon-Trent) and in the area overall.

== History ==
Leigh Richmond Roose pictured in a Stoke team photograph c.1904.

=== Early years (1882 to 1919) ===
The two clubs have long league histories, with Stoke City's officially stated founding date being in 1863 and Port Vale claiming to have been formed in 1876. The first derby game was played at Westport Meadows on 2 December 1882, in the second round of the Staffordshire Senior Cup. Vale were complete unknowns, and so pulled off a surprise by managing a 1–1 draw with their more established rivals-to-be. No details of the match were recorded, though The Staffordshire Sentinel did mention the match, along with the comment that it was "a spirited game". Stoke won the replay seven days later 5–1 at the Victoria Ground, with George Shutt scoring four of the goals. Vale won the North Staffordshire Charity Challenge Cup in 1883 to establish themselves as the primary local challenger to the dominance of Stoke. The first meeting in a national competition came on 15 October 1887, with a George Lawton goal on the hour mark giving Stoke a 1–0 home win in the first round of the FA Cup. It took Vale 17 attempts to register their first victory over Stoke, which they finally did in a friendly on 29 March 1890, winning 2–1 in front of 7,000 spectators. By then, Vale had already achieved victory over Stoke in the courts after suing them in county court over the registrations of Bill Rowley and George Bateman, which had caused bad feelings between the two clubs. A friendly in 1893 was advertised as "the championship of the Potteries". Stoke had to pay £20 to charity after being sued by Vale when Rowley had a rib broken in a friendly between the two clubs and Vale again successfully sued Stoke when Rowley and Bateman walked out on their contracts to play for Stoke instead of Vale.

Stoke were founder members of the English Football League in 1888. Though Vale became founder members of the Football League Second Division in 1892, Stoke remained in the First Division until 1907. With the two teams playing in different divisions of a structured league competition, interest in seeing the two clubs play each other in friendlies and local cup competitions decreased, whilst Stoke occasionally only deemed it necessary to send reserve players to play the Vale as crowds for the derby fell to as low as 300. The two teams were meanwhile drawn to face each other in both the Birmingham Senior Cup and Staffordshire Senior Cup for four successive years from 1900 to 1903. Both clubs were forced to resign their Football League memberships due to financial troubles in 1907 and 1908, meaning that scheduled Second Division derby matches on 7 September 1907 and 4 January 1908 never took place. The rivalry entered the literary world in Arnold Bennett's 1911 novel The Card, in which Knype (based on Stoke) and Bursley (based on Vale) "engaged as much in the pursuit of dividends as in the practice of the one ancient and glorious sport which appeals to the reason and the heart of England".

Stoke-on-Trent federalised in 1910, meaning the two clubs became Stoke-on-Trent borough rivals for the first time. However, at this point, Vale were competing with Stoke Reserves in the North Staffordshire & District League and the Stoke first-team were in the Birmingham & District League and Division Two of the Southern League. Tension remained, though, with eccentric Wales international goalkeeper Leigh Richmond Roose requiring police intervention to prevent him from being thrown into the River Trent by Stoke supporters after he guested for Vale wearing his old Stoke shirt in a District League decider between Port Vale and Stoke Reserves. The two clubs harboured ambitions of returning to the Football League, however, and made a pact that meant Vale would not bid for membership, leaving Stoke more likely to succeed in their bid; Stoke would then support Vale in any future bids they made. Stoke were voted back into the Football League in 1915, though World War I delayed their re-entry until 1919, at which stage Vale also won re-election at the expense of the expelled Leeds City.

=== Sharing a city (1920 to 1957) ===
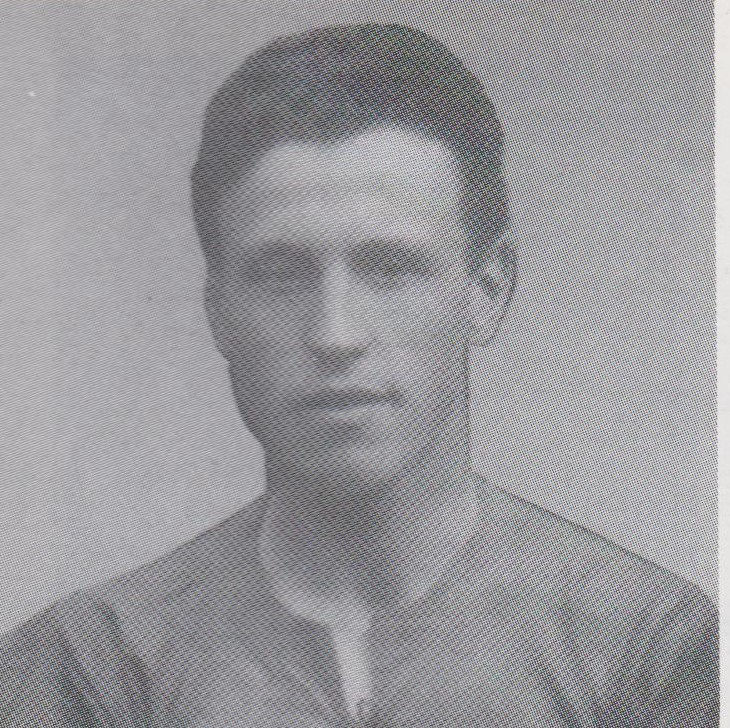
Wilf Kirkham scored nine derby goals, eight for Vale and one for Stoke, in a ten-year professional career in the city.

The first Football League Potteries derby match took place at the Old Recreation Ground on 6 March 1920, when 22,697 spectators witnessed a 3–0 Stoke victory. The Vale did manage a credible 0–0 draw at the Victoria Ground seven days later. The 1920–21 season saw Vale claim a league double over Stoke, though the Potters did claim the North Staffordshire Infirmary Cup, in what were annual Stoke vs Vale games of the period played to raise funds for the North Staffordshire Royal Infirmary. Stoke achieved promotion the following season, and though they were relegated after one season in the First Division, managed to record a league double over Vale in 1923–24. Vale recorded another league double in the 1924–25 campaign. Stoke-on-Trent gained city status in June 1925, and Stoke changed their name to Stoke City two months later. The 1925–26 season would prove disastrous for the club, however, as Vale recorded another league double as Stoke were relegated to the Third Division North. Despite now being the top club in the area for the first time, the Port Vale board of directors agreed in principle to amalgamate with Stoke City in April 1926. City rejected the offer, and went on to return to the Second Division as Third Division North champions in 1927.

Stoke achieved a league double over Vale in 1928–29, winning both games by two goals to one. Vale then emulated their rivals by being relegated in 1929, returning to the Second Division a year later as champions of the Third Division North. They went on to achieve a club record finish of fifth in 1930–31, despite only taking one point from the two Potteries derby league games. The 1931–32 season saw some big scorelines in derby games, as Vale won 3–0 at home and Stoke won 4–0 at home in the league, whilst Stoke took the North Staffordshire Infirmary Cup by winning 7–0. City went on to achieve a league double over their rivals on their way to the Second Division title at the end of the 1932–33 season, with their 3–1 victory at the Old Recreation Ground on 4 March 1933 proving to be the last Football League fixture between the clubs for another 21 years.

Stoke established themselves in the First Division, finishing fourth in 1935–36. In contrast, Vale went on to end the decade in the Third Division South. Though Stoke operated throughout the whole of World War II, Vale went into abeyance for four years from 1940. The two teams met after Vale's senior team reformed, with Stoke recording some heavy victories over them in what remained of the wartime leagues. The Old Recreation Ground was sold to the local council, and Vale Park opened in 1950, though the chance for a competitive derby game at the new ground came too soon. The two teams were drawn in the FA Cup and came to a 2–2 stalemate at the Victoria Ground – witnessed by a derby record attendance of 49,500 – on 6 January 1951, though major drainage problems at Vale Park meant the replay was also staged at the Victoria Ground and the Potters won 1–0.

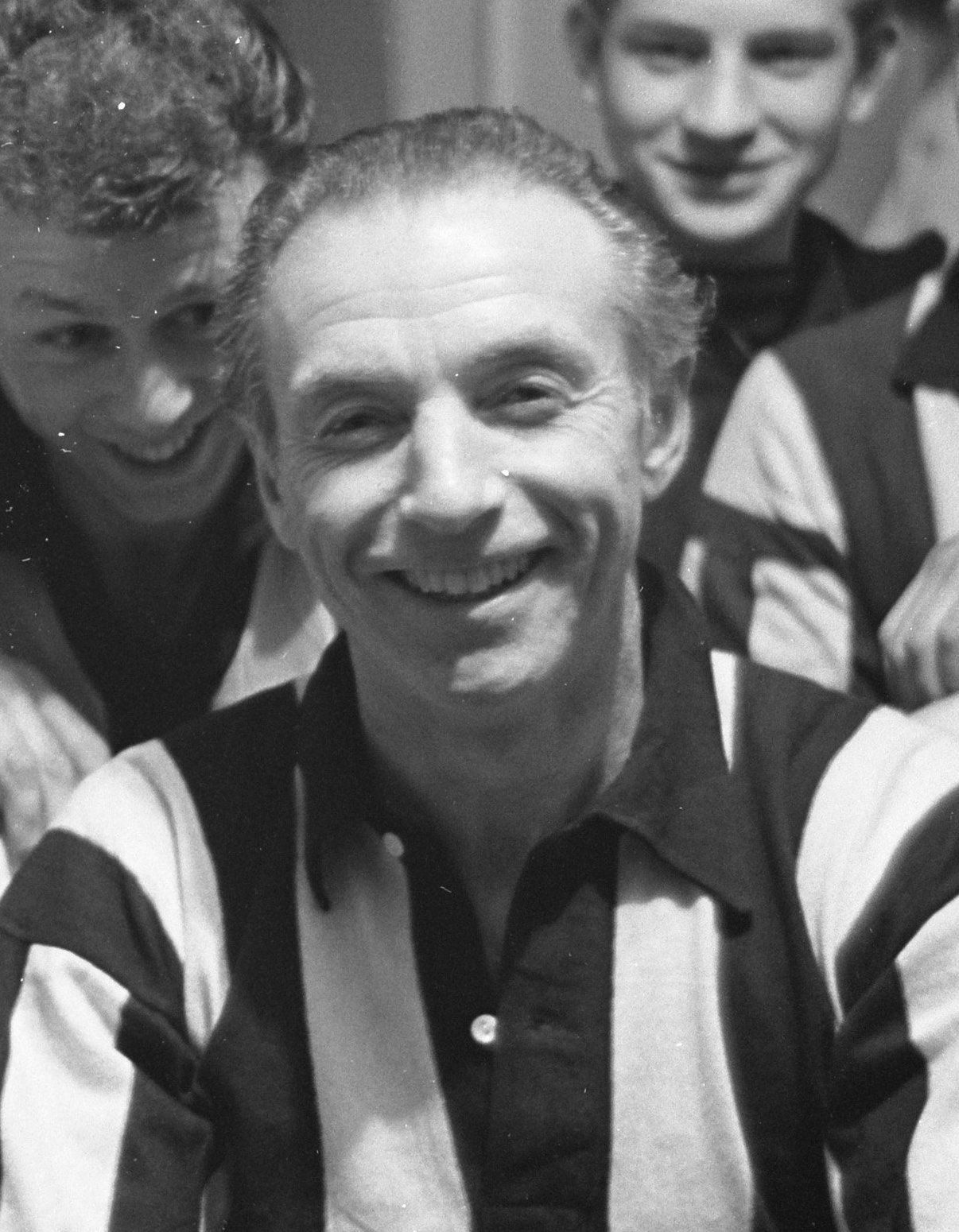
Stanley Matthews in 1962

Vale won promotion as Third Division North champions in 1954 to set up a resumption of the derby games in the Second Division. League derby games resumed with a 0–0 draw in front of a crowd of 46,777 at the Victoria Ground on 4 September 1954. Vale Park finally held a derby game on 25 April 1955, with Stoke the victors by one goal to nil; the crowd of 41,674 set a never-to-be-broken attendance record at Vale Park. On 10 October 1956, the Victoria Ground saw its first game under floodlights as Stoke recorded a 3–1 win over their local rivals. The two teams played out a 2–2 draw at Vale Park on 29 April 1957, which would prove to be the last competitive match between the two clubs in a national competition for 32 years.

=== A dormant rivalry (1958 to 1988) ===
Port Vale were relegated to the Third Division in 1957, leaving the two clubs to face each other only in friendly games and the short-lived Supporters' Clubs' Trophy competition which pitted Stoke and Vale against each other in two-legged finals in 1960 and 1961. Tony Waddington re-signed Stanley Matthews in 1961 and led the Potters to the Second Division title two years later. Port Vale would fall into the Fourth Division in 1965, leaving a gap of three divisions between the two rivals. Stanley Matthews joined Port Vale as general manager, but his spell in Burslem went disastrously wrong, with the club forced to apply for re-election to the Football League in 1968 as punishment for making illegal payments to players – Stoke City were one of 39 clubs that voted to admit the Vale, opposing just nine who voted to remove them from the competition. City, meanwhile, won a major tournament for the first time in 1972 by winning the League Cup. Vale allowed Stoke to play a home game against Middlesbrough at Vale Park on 17 January 1976 when a freak gale caused severe damage to the Victoria Ground; a crowd of 21,009 saw a top-flight league fixture at the stadium for the first time. Stoke were relegated from the top flight in 1985, whilst John Rudge further closed the gap when he took the Valiants back into the third tier the following year. Another promotion followed in 1989 to reunite Stoke and Vale in the second tier of English football. In the many years spent apart, which coincided with the rise of football hooliganism in the United Kingdom, relations between the clubs were cordial, and many local football fans attended home fixtures at both clubs without issue.

=== Heated rivals (1989 to 2002) ===
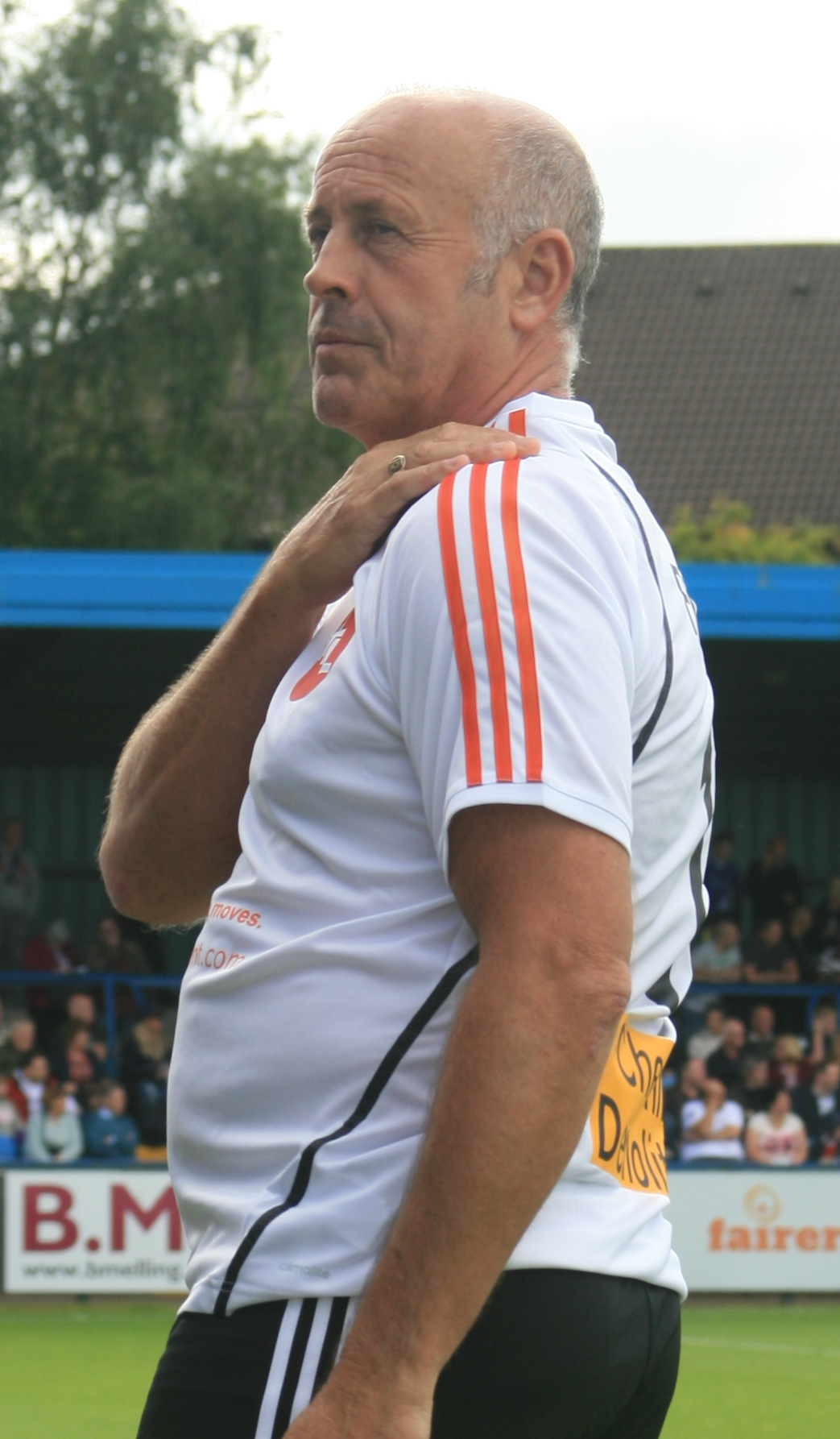
Martin Foyle scored three goals in derby games.

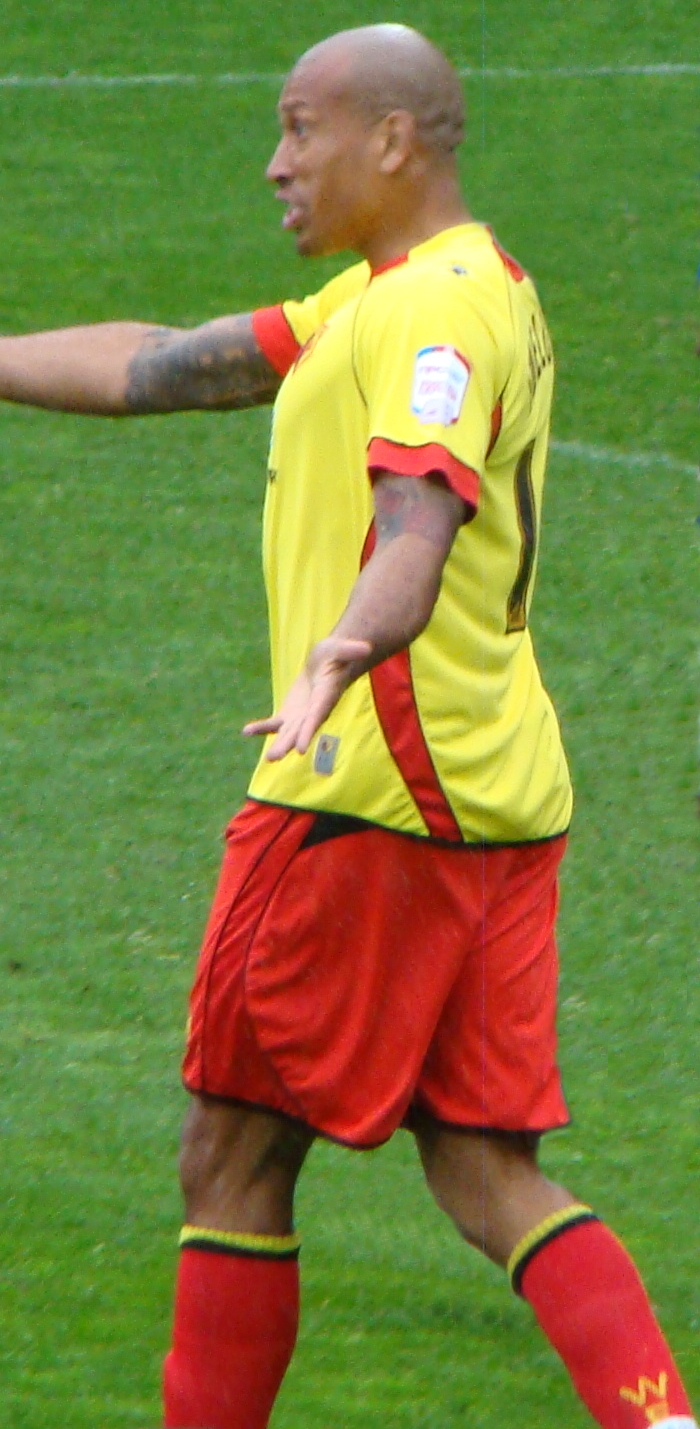
Chris Iwelumo scored Stoke's most recent derby goal and said "the Port Vale goal, when you look at what it meant and who it was against, is up there as my best goal".

Hostilities were resumed on 23 September 1989, with Stoke and Vale playing out a 1–1 draw in front of the highest crowd (27,004) at the Victoria Ground since the visit of Liverpool seven years earlier. Vale goalscorer Robbie Earle felt that his team were thought of as "little Vale, coming for their big day out", and Rudge commented after the match that "[the result] proves that we have closed the gap on Stoke and are now competing on equal terms". The event was marred by violence, however, as 85 individuals were arrested for fighting. Though Stoke gained a point in the return fixture – with 35 people arrested for fighting in Burslem, City went on to be relegated as they slipped to a division below the Vale for the first time in 64 years. Vale joined them in the third tier in 1992, with Stoke now in the ascendancy under the management of Lou Macari.

The 1992–93 season saw five derby games as the two promotion-chasing clubs were drawn against each other in the FA Cup and Football League Trophy, in addition to their two Second Division fixtures. The first encounter came in the league at the Victoria Ground on 24 October, when Mark Stein converted a controversial penalty he had won following a foul by goalkeeper Paul Musselwhite to give the home side a 2–1 win. Stein described an "electric" atmosphere, saying the hissing sound from the ground "was like something I had never known, I'd had derbies before for Luton against Watford, but Stoke–Vale was something different". The two teams faced each other again in the FA Cup first round at the same venue on 16 November, broadcast on Sky Sports, though this time a 0–0 draw was played out. The replay was held amidst torrential rain at Vale Park eight days later, in a game which saw Steve Foley hospitalise Neil Aspin with a knee-high challenge before the Valiants went into half-time with a 2–1 lead thanks to goals from Martin Foyle and Andy Porter. The ongoing rain turned the Vale Park pitch to mud, leading to a memorable moment early in the second half when a Dave Regis shot into an empty net was halted by a patch of mud around the penalty spot, allowing Peter Swan to clear the danger; the mud was also a factor in Vale's third goal as a long ball from Nicky Cross came to a premature halt, allowing Foyle to collect and beat Ronnie Sinclair to secure a 3–1 victory.

The 1992–93 series of derby games continued, with Stoke looking to defend their 1992 Football League Trophy title in the Area semi-finals clash under the floodlights at the Victoria Ground on 3 March. The visitors claimed their first competitive victory at the Victoria Ground since 1927, with Robin van der Laan the game's only goalscorer after Stein hit the post with a first-half penalty and also had a goal ruled out for offside; Vale would go on to beat Stockport County in the final. The return league fixture was held at Vale Park on 31 March, with 20,373 fans turning out to see if the Vale could close the seven-point gap on league leaders Stoke City, who would virtually seal promotion with an away victory. Stein opened the scoring with a volley on five minutes and Nigel Gleghorn headed in a corner kick on 64 minutes to seal a league double for the Potters over their city rivals. Stoke went on to win the Second Division title. However, by losing at Bolton Wanderers in the penultimate game of the campaign they allowed Bolton to beat Vale to the second automatic promotion spot. Vale were beaten finalists in the play-offs but were reunited with City in the First Division after a second-place finish in 1993–94.

The two teams had to wait until 14 March 1995 for their first meeting of the 1994–95 season, with goals from Tony Naylor and Lee Sandford securing a 1–1 draw that did little to ease both side's fears of relegation. The return fixture on 22 April was less tense as both teams had a healthy gap on the relegation zone, and it was Vale who claimed the local bragging rights with Foyle scoring the only goal of the game to claim Vale's first away win over Stoke in a league fixture since 1927. The two sides met in the third match of the 1995–96 season and Ian Bogie beat Carl Muggleton at his near post to give Vale a third consecutive away derby victory. The Valiants achieved their first league double over Stoke in 71 years by winning the return fixture under the floodlights on 12 March, with Bogie again the only name on the scoresheet, this time scoring within just 12 seconds of the kick-off; BBC Radio Stoke commentator George Andrews excitedly reported that "Bogie's done the business! Five seconds into the game, the Bogie Boogie has set it alight here, and the Stokies are stunned". Beaten in the 1996 play-offs, Stoke remained undefeated in the 1996–97 derby games, first drawing 1–1 on a sunny Sunday Burslem afternoon on 13 October after a late Lee Mills header cancelled out Kevin Keen's opener. The final derby game at the Victoria Ground took place on 20 April 1997, when a brace from Mike Sheron ensured a 2–0 win in what was also Macari's penultimate game as manager.

The Britannia Stadium (later renamed as the Bet365 Stadium in 2016) held its first derby game on 12 October 1997, and Keen proved to be key, providing an assist for Richard Forsyth's opener and then scoring the winning goal of a 2–1 victory himself. Stoke's league form collapsed at the end of the following month, however, and they entered the return fixture on 1 March 1998 just one place above Vale in the relegation zone. With both teams desperate not to lose, the game ended in a 0–0 draw. Both club's First Division survival was decided on the final day of the 1997–98 season and Vale's 4–0 win at Huddersfield Town secured their safety whilst Stoke's 5–2 home defeat to Manchester City saw both Stoke and Manchester City relegated to the third tier. The derby games went on a two-year hiatus before Vale joined Stoke after being relegated to the third tier in 2000.

In September 2000, with Port Vale in an increasingly perilous financial state, Stoke's Icelandic owners were reportedly looking to merge the two clubs. The two teams met on 17 September, though only 8,948 fans were in attendance at Vale Park to witness a 1–1 draw as Marc Bridge-Wilkinson and Kyle Lightbourne found the net within the game's opening quarter of an hour. By the time of the next meeting on 17 February 2001, both clubs had been eliminated from the FA Cup by non-League opposition, though Stoke had managed to maintain good league form – despite losing 8–0 at home to Liverpool in the League Cup. A crowd of 22,133 came to the Britannia Stadium to see the two derby rivals play out another 1–1 draw, with Dave Brammer finding an equaliser to cancel out James O'Connor's opener. The two sides met again at the Britannia Stadium in the Football League Trophy on 5 March (the game had originally been due to be held at Vale Park, but the venue was switched as Vale's pitch faced drainage issues), and though Vale manager Brian Horton played a strong eleven, Stoke boss Guðjón Þórðarson's priority was promotion and so he rested key players. Goals from Micky Cummins and Nicky Mohan left the scores level at full-time and the tie was settled with Bridge-Wilkinson's golden goal from the penalty spot after Mohan was penalised for handball. As was the case after beating Stoke at the same stage of the competition in 1993, Vale went on to lift the trophy with victory in the 2001 final.

With Stoke having lost to Walsall in the 2001 Second Division play-off semi-finals, the two derby rivals met again for two league fixtures in the 2001–02 campaign. Both clubs faced acute financial pressures, though again Stoke were in the hunt for the play-offs as Vale settled into mid-table. The first derby game took place at Vale Park on 21 October, and Stephen McPhee looked to have given the home side the victory with a headed goal, before Chris Iwelumo equalised with ten minutes left to play; Iwelumo later recalled that "I never ripped up trees for Stoke but the fans have always been very appreciative and held me in high regard... because of goals like that". The return fixture at the Britannia Stadium on 10 February 2002 was witnessed by 23,019 supporters, with Vale hoping to derail their rival's promotion push. Cummins scored the game's only goal after a scrappy piece of play in the 36th minute and went on to say "It was a brilliant, brilliant, brilliant game, brilliant atmosphere, everything's electric. You feel the energy from the crowd, really urging you to win. Brilliant." Iwelumo was not selected for the game and theorised that Stoke's Scandinavian contingent failed to appreciate the importance of the game in the same way that Vale's British players had done. Stoke went on though to secure promotion, going up to the First Division by beating Brentford in the 2002 play-off final.

=== Keeping apart (2002 onwards) ===
Comparative chart of yearly table positions in the league of Port Vale and Stoke City.

The two clubs experienced vastly different fortunes in the decades since 2002. Port Vale twice came close to going out of existence, entering administration in December 2002 and March 2012. Stoke, meanwhile, experienced ten seasons of Premier League football under the ownership of local billionaire Peter Coates, also reaching the 2011 FA Cup final. Before then, however, the previous owner Gunnar Gíslason had attempted to exploit Vale's administration peril in 2003 by bidding to buy the club out of administration and enforce a groundshare arrangement. The administrators instead chose Bill Bratt's Valiant2001 supporters' group as the club's new owners.

Upon Stoke's relegation from the Premier League in 2018, a group of Vale fans arranged for a plane to fly over the bet365 Stadium, towing a banner saying "WE STOOD THERE LAUGHING – PVFC". However, at the time, Stoke were playing away at Swansea City, and their relegation had already been confirmed a week earlier. On 4 December 2018, Stoke's under-21s lost 4–0 to Vale's first-team in the EFL Trophy at Vale Park, and after the match an estimated "minority of 150-200 people" within Stoke's 4,000 ticket allocation vandalised the away end at Vale Park; despite being against a youth-team the match was still Vale's season-high attendance record of 7,940. Following Vale's relegation from League One in 2023–24, a plane flew over Vale Park before their final game of the season with a banner reading "SHE STOOD THERE LAUGHING – N40".

== Results ==
=== By competition ===
As of match played 10 February 2002

Competition	Played	Port Vale wins	Drawn	Stoke City wins	Port Vale goals	Stoke City goals
Football League	44	13	15	16	41	45
FA Cup	6	1	2	3	7	9
EFL Cup	0	0	0	0	0	0
Football League Trophy	2	2	0	0	3	1
National level sub-total	52	16	17	19	51	55
Birmingham Senior Cup	11	3	3	5	16	18
North Staffordshire Charity Challenge Cup	2	0	1	1	1	2
North Staffordshire Infirmary Cup	9	1	2	6	8	23
Staffordshire Charity Cup	1	1	0	0	2	0
Staffordshire Senior Cup	12	3	2	7	18	27
Supporters' Clubs' Trophy	5	2	1	2	5	6
Regional level sub-total	40	10	9	21	50	76
Total	92	26	26	40	101	131

This table only includes competitive first-team games, excluding all pre-season games, friendlies, abandoned matches, testimonials and games played during the First and Second World Wars.

=== Full list of results ===
List shows all competitive senior matches in the English Football League, the FA Cup, EFL Cup, and Football League Trophy. Matches from wartime competitions, friendlies, Staffordshire Senior Cup, and other minor cup competitions are not included.
Score lists the home team first.
Source for matches before 1999: Kent, Jeff: "The Potteries Derbies" (Witan Books, 1998, ISBN 0-9529152-3-5)

Date	Competition	Stadium	Score	Port Vale Scorers	Stoke City Scorers	Att.
15 October 1887	FA Cup first round	Victoria Ground	1–0		Lawton	
Port Vale and Stoke City re-admitted to the Football League 1919–20
6 March 1920	Second Division	Old Recreation Ground	0–3		Whittingham, Brown, Watkin	22,697
13 March 1920	Second Division	Victoria Ground	0–0			27,000
25 September 1920	Second Division	Old Recreation Ground	2–1	Page, Briscoe	McColl	20,000
2 October 1920	Second Division	Victoria Ground	0–1	Blood		26,500
24 September 1921	Second Division	Victoria Ground	0–0			30,000
1 October 1921	Second Division	Old Recreation Ground	0–1		J Broad	20,000
7 January 1922	FA Cup first round	Old Recreation Ground	2–4	Page, Brough	Watkin (3), Tempest	14,471
Stoke promoted to First Division 1921–22
Stoke relegated to Second Division 1922–23
6 October 1923	Second Division	Victoria Ground	1–0		Clarke	21,685
13 October 1923	Second Division	Old Recreation Ground	2–4	Page, Butler	J Broad (2), Eyres (2)	16,800
20 September 1924	Second Division	Victoria Ground	0–1	Connelly		22,747
24 January 1925	Second Division	Old Recreation Ground	2–0	Kirkham, Tempest		17,936
31 August 1925	Second Division	Old Recreation Ground	3–0	Kirkham (2 [1 pen]), Strange		19,997
7 September 1925	Second Division	Victoria Ground	0–3	Kirkham (3)		21,869
Stoke City relegated to Third Division North 1925–26
Stoke City promoted to Second Division 1926–27
5 November 1927	Second Division	Victoria Ground	0–2	Anstiss, Kirkham		31,493
17 March 1928	Second Division	Old Recreation Ground	0–0			21,071
15 September 1928	Second Division	Victoria Ground	2–1	Griffiths	Davies, Bussey	35,288
26 January 1929	Second Division	Old Recreation Ground	1–2	Mandley	Shirley (2)	18,869
Port Vale relegated to Third Division North 1928–29
Port Vale promoted to Second Division 1929–30
13 December 1930	Second Division	Victoria Ground	1–0		Robertson	26,609
18 April 1931	Second Division	Old Recreation Ground	0–0			13,403
26 September 1931	Second Division	Victoria Ground	4–0		Sale, Bussey (3)	28,292
6 February 1932	Second Division	Old Recreation Ground	3–0	Marshall (2), Henshall		21,089
22 October 1932	Second Division	Victoria Ground	1–0		Johnson	29,296
4 March 1933	Second Division	Old Recreation Ground	1–3	McGrath	Johnson, Ware, Matthews	19,625
Stoke City promoted to First Division 1932–33
6 January 1951	FA Cup first round	Victoria Ground	2–2	Bennett, Pinchbeck	Mullard (2)	49,500
8 January 1951	FA Cup first round	Victoria Ground	1–0		Bowyer	40,977
Port Vale promoted to Second Division 1953–54
4 September 1954	Second Division	Victoria Ground	0–0			46,777
25 April 1955	Second Division	Vale Park	0–1		Bowyer	41,674
8 October 1955	Second Division	Vale Park	1–0	Done		37,261
31 March 1956	Second Division	Victoria Ground	1–1	Griffiths	Oscroft	37,928
10 October 1956	Second Division	Victoria Ground	3–1	Smith	Coleman (2), Kelly	39,446
29 April 1957	Second Division	Vale Park	2–2	Cunliffe, Steele	Graver, King	22,395
Port Vale relegated to Third Division 1956–57
Port Vale promoted to Second Division 1988–89
23 September 1989	Second Division	Victoria Ground	1–1	Earle	Palin	27,004
3 February 1990	Second Division	Vale Park	0–0			22,075
Stoke City relegated to Third Division 1989–90
Port Vale relegated to Third Division 1991–92 (Third Division is rebranded as the Second Division due to the creation of the Premier League)
24 October 1992	Second Division	Victoria Ground	2–1	Kerr	Cranson, Stein	24,334
16 November 1992	FA Cup first round replay	Victoria Ground	0–0			24,490
24 November 1992	FA Cup first round replay	Vale Park	3–1	Foyle (2), Porter	Sandford	19,810
3 March 1993	Football League Trophy	Victoria Ground	0–1	Van der Laan		22,254
31 March 1993	Second Division	Vale Park	0–2		Stein, Gleghorn	20,373
Stoke City promoted to First Division 1992–1993
Port Vale promoted to First Division 1993–1994
14 March 1995	First Division	Vale Park	1–1	Naylor	Sandford	19,510
22 April 1995	First Division	Victoria Ground	0–1	Foyle		20,429
27 August 1995	First Division	Victoria Ground	0–1	Bogie		14,283
12 March 1996	First Division	Vale Park	1–0	Bogie		16,737
13 October 1996	First Division	Vale Park	1–1	Mills	Keen	14,396
20 April 1997	First Division	Victoria Ground	2–0		Sheron (2)	16,426
12 October 1997	First Division	Britannia Stadium	2–1	Naylor	Forsyth, Keen	20,125
1 March 1998	First Division	Vale Park	0–0			13,853
Stoke City relegated to Second Division 1997–98
Port Vale relegated to Second Division 1999–2000
17 September 2000	Second Division	Vale Park	1–1	Bridge-Wilkinson	Lightbourne	8,948
17 February 2001	Second Division	Britannia Stadium	1–1	Brammer	O'Connor	22,133
5 March 2001	Football League Trophy	Britannia Stadium	1–2	Cummins, Bridge-Wilkinson	Mohan	11,323
21 October 2001	Second Division	Vale Park	1–1	McPhee	Iwelumo	10,344
10 February 2002	Second Division	Britannia Stadium	0–1	Cummins		23,019
Stoke City promoted to First Division 2001–02

== Statistics ==
=== Honours ===
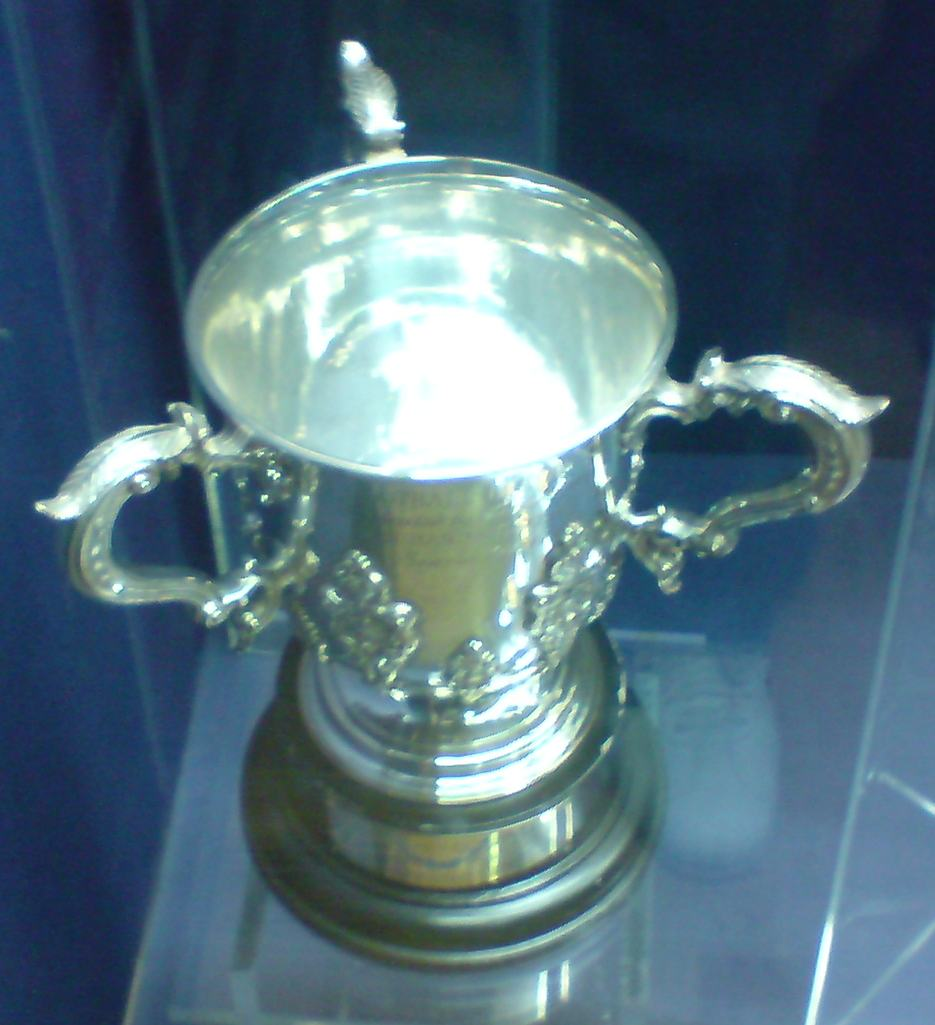
The League Cup trophy, won by Stoke City in 1972.

These are the major footballing honours of Port Vale and Stoke City.

Competition	Port Vale	Stoke City
Second Division / Championship (2nd tier)	0	2
Third Division / Third Division North / League One (3rd tier)	2	2
Fourth Division / League Two (4th tier)	1	0
League Cup / EFL Cup	0	1
Football League Trophy / EFL Trophy	2	2
Total	5	7

=== Records ===
- First ever meeting: Stoke 1–0 Burslem Port Vale (Staffordshire Senior Cup), 2 December 1882
- First football league meeting: Port Vale 0–3 Stoke (Second Division), 6 March 1920
- Highest scoring game: Port Vale 3–5 Stoke (Staffordshire Senior Cup), 22 March 1884 & Stoke 5–3 Port Vale (North Staffordshire Infirmary Cup), 6 October 1902
- Largest winning margin (Stoke): Port Vale 0–7 Stoke City (North Staffordshire Infirmary Cup), 9 May 1932
- Largest winning margin (Port Vale): Stoke 0–5 Port Vale (Staffordshire Senior Cup), 25 September 1905
- Record highest attendance: 49,500, 6 January 1951, Victoria Ground. Stoke City 2–2 Port Vale
- Most competitive Potteries derby appearances: Bob McGrory, 21. (9 May 1921 – 30 September 1935)
- Most competitive Potteries derby goals: Arthur Watkin, 10 (20 April 1914 – 7 January 1922)

== Personnel and transfers ==
=== Players who have played for both clubs ===
Hundreds of players have spent time with both Port Vale and Stoke City, particularly those active before the 1930s when it was relatively uncommon for a player to leave their local area. Prominent players of this period include Tommy Clare, who represented England during his time at Stoke, though would both start and end his professional career at Vale. Other important names include that of Arthur Bridgett (another England international), Billy Heames (208 league appearances for Vale), Tom Holford (another England international, who would also manage Vale after 248 league appearances for Stoke) and Wilf Kirkham (Vale's all-time top goalscorer). After the Second World War, however, legendary Stoke players such as Alan Bloor, Jimmy Greenhoff and Eric Skeels spent the tail ends of their careers at Vale, whilst Stanley Matthews and Freddie Steele had contrasting fortunes as managers at the Vale. Chamberlain brothers, Mark and Neville went from Vale to Stoke in the 1980s, with Mark responding to being asked if the move led to his friends reacted negatively to the switch by saying "No not really. Mind you I wouldn't, I didn't really have any mates."

Lee Mills and Steve Guppy, key performers for the Vale in the 1990s, went on to feature for Stoke in the new millennium. In addition to representing Vale and Stoke, Dave Brammer also turned out for Crewe Alexandra after being sold to Crewe by Vale chairman Bill Bell against the fans' wishes for a £500,000 fee in August 2001. Carl Dickinson and Danny Pugh were both well-liked figures at Stoke in the 2000s who found an equal level of popularity at the Vale in the 2010s. Will Forrester and Liam McCarron moved from Stoke to Vale in the summer of 2022, the former permanently and the latter on loan, in what was described as a "new era" in relations between the two clubs. Before McCarron, John Lumsdon was the last player to have joined Port Vale on loan from Stoke City, having made the move in March 1978.

Players in bold transferred directly between the clubs, or were released by one and then signed for the other. Only players who made a competitive first-team appearance are included on the list.

Player	Port Vale career			Stoke City career		
Player	Span	Appearances	Goals	Span	Appearances	Goals
**Ron Andrew**	1964–1965	8	1	1957–1964	129	2
Len Armitage	1932–1934	13	2	1924–1932	200	19
Bill Asprey	1967–1968	33	0	1953–1966	341	26
Tom Baddeley	1893–1896	67	0	1910	7	0
**Lewis Ballham**	1888–1890	16	6	1891–1892	52	16
**George Bateman**	1882–1886; 1886–1890	20	0	1886–1887; 1891–1892	7	0
Jason Beckford	1991	5	1	1994–1995	5	0
Harry Benson	1908–1911	43	0	1901–1907	91	0
Bill Bentley	1977–1980	106	0	1964–1968	53	2
**Brian Bithell**	1977	2	0	1976–1977	18	0
**Alan Bloor**	1978–1979	6	1	1961–1977	482	19
**Lucien Boullemier**	1897–1902; 1905	171	8	1896	7	0
**Arthur Box**	1904–1907	52	1	1907–1909	39	0
William Bradbury	1903–1907	12	0	1910–1911	31	0
Dave Brammer	1999–2001; 2008–2009	98	4	2004–2007	112	3
Arthur Bridgett	1923–1924	15	7	1902	7	0
**Ian Brightwell**	2002–2004	41	0	2002	5	0
**Joe Brough**	1906–1907; 1909–1910; 1913–1922	189	104	1907	1	0
**Adrian Capes**	1900–1905; 1907–1911	214	84	1905–1907	19	2
**Mark Chamberlain**	1979–1982	110	20	1982–1985	124	18
**Neville Chamberlain**	1978–1982	158	41	1982–1984	7	0
**Tommy Clare**	1884; 1897; 1898–1901	52	0	1884–1897	252	6
**Albert Cook**	1900–1906; 1907; 1909–1911	64	7	1906	12	1
**William Cope**	1904–1907	77	1	1907–1908	31	0
Harry Cotton	1901–1905	139	0	1905–1908	22	1
**Tom Coxon**	1902–1903; 1906–1907	46	16	1903–1904; 1907	38	6
**Harry Davies**	1938–1939	49	5	1922–1929; 1932–1937	411	101
Carl Dickinson	2013–2016	143	4	2004–2011	60	0
Tony Dinning	2005–2006	48	5	2002	8	0
Alan Dodd	1986–1987	3	0	1969–1982	401	4
**Billy Draycott**	1890–1891	3	1	1891–1894	2	0
**Archie Dyke**	1913–1914; 1919	21	2	1909–1912; 1914	44	3
**Billy Eardley**	1894–1895; 1895–1896	19	7	1896	10	1
**Francis Eardley**	1910–1911	6	2	1909	3	2
Wayne Ebanks	1985–1987	48	0	1984	12	0
Ted Evans	1896–1899	44	15	1891–1895	61	19
**Arthur Fielding**	1910–1911	4	5	1908–1909	3	0
John Flowers	1971–1972	37	0	1963–1966	9	0
**Peter Ford**	1959–1963	121	5	1956–1959	14	0
**Will Forrester**	2022–2023	38	2	2007–2022	4	1
Jimmy Greenhoff	1981–1983	56	5	1969–1976	346	103
Peter Griffiths	1984–1986	48	5	1983–1984	64	5
Steve Guppy	1994–1997	128	13	2004	4	0
Charles Hallam	1922–1923	2	0	1924–1927	33	2
**Mark Harrison**	1980–1982	80	0	1982–1983	8	0
Arthur Hartshorne	1902–1903	30	3	1903–1905	56	0
**Billy Heames**	1897–1904	233	26	1883–1887	16	2
Geoff Hickson	1968	17	0	1959–1961	11	0
**Ted Holdcroft**	1901–1903	18	1	1903–1905	44	11
Tom Holford	1919–1924	56	1	1898–1908	269	33
**Vic Horrocks**	1905–1907; 1911–1912	39	2	1904; 1908–1911	20	8
Sam Howshall	1903–1905	2	0	1908	1	2
Jason Jarrett	2009	13	0	2005	3	0
**Arthur Jepson**	1938–1946	53	0	1946–1948	32	0
Tony Kelly	1994	5	1	1986–1987	44	4
**Wilf Kirkham**	1923–1929; 1932–1933	276	164	1929–1932	51	30
**Tony Lacey**	1970–1975	215	9	1967–1969	5	0
**Billy Leech**	1899–1900	30	1	1900–1901	50	2
Terry Lees	1975–1976	47	2	1970–1975	28	0
**Harry Leese**	1913–1919	42	4	1907; 1909–1913	119	29
**John Lumsdon**	1978	5	0	1975–1978	28	0
Neil MacKenzie	2008–2009	3	0	1996–1999	46	1
**Ted McDonald**	1894–1896; 1897–1899	120	12	1896–1897	2	0
**Arden Maddison**	1924–1927	53	1	1924	1	0
Jack Maddock	1923–1931	182	12	1919–1921	23	4
Paul Maguire	1985–1988	147	27	1980–1984	120	25
**Alan Martin**	1941–1951	198	31	1951–1955	115	6
**Liam McCarron**	2022–2023	4	0	2021–2022	0	0
Lee Mills	1995–1998	128	44	2003	11	2
**Jackie Mudie**	1963–1967	64	11	1961–1963	93	33
**Albert Mullard**	1951–1956	178	23	1950–1951	23	5
Ernest Mullineux	1900–1904	127	2	1907–1914	187	0
Jimmy O'Neill	1965–1966	48	0	1960–1964	149	0
Harry Oscroft	1959–1961	48	12	1949–1959	349	107
Gareth Owen	2008–2009; 2009–2013	129	2	2001–2005	5	0
Syd Owen	1907; 1908	1	0	1906; 1907	10	6
Louis Page	1932–1933	19	2	1919–1922	21	1
Martin Paterson	2016	18	2	2005–2007	16	1
Jack Peart	1922	7	0	1909–1912	47	41
**Syd Peppitt**	1950–1951	11	2	1936–1950	106	29
**Edward Proctor**	1896–1897	17	4	1895–1896	3	2
Danny Pugh	2017–2020	56	3	2007–2012	89	3
**Bob Ramsay**	1886–1888; 1893–1894	16	0	1888–1890	47	5
Vic Rouse	1926–1929	102	0	1922–1926	95	2
Arthur Rowley	1902–1903	66	4	1896–1899	62	0
Kevin Sheldon	1982	5	0	1975–1981	15	0
George Shutt	1891–1893	2	0	1885–1889	30	2
**Barry Siddall**	1982–1984	93	0	1984–1986	20	0
Eric Skeels	1976–1977	5	1	1959–1976	597	7
Freddie Steele	1951–1953	25	12	1933–1949	251	159
**James Swarbrick**	1911–1912	22	3	1910–1911	3	0
**Billy Tempest**	1924–1926	45	3	1912–1924	217	31
Michael Tonge	2017–2019	39	4	2008–2013	19	0
**Billy Twemlow**	1921–1923	22	0	1916–1921	37	2
Steve Waddington	1982–1983	2	0	1976–1979	56	6
**Tommy Ward**	1936–1938; 1939	61	29	1938–1939	5	4
**Frank Watkin**	1929–1931	13	9	1926	5	3
**Frank Whitehouse**	1899–1900	19	1	1900–1904	95	24
Louis Williams	1912–1913	8	0	1907–1908	36	1
**Ron Wilson**	1963–1970	293	5	1959–1964	11	0
**Alf Wood**	1892–1895	65	18	1895–1901	134	10
John Woodward	1973–1975	106	32	1964–1967	11	1

=== Managers who worked at both clubs ===
Many managers of Stoke and Vale have also spent time with the other team at some point in their careers. Joe Schofield is the only man to have managed both teams, spending eight years as a player and four as a manager of Stoke, before he spent almost the entire 1920s in charge at Vale until he died whilst in office on 29 September 1929. Micky Adams took charge of 247 matches for Vale, though as a player at Stoke had featured just 10 times in a three-month loan spell. John Rudge managed Vale for 843 games for 16 years, including some of the most fiercely contested derby games, so his decision to work as Stoke's director of football following his sacking from Vale proved highly contentious. Rudge, who later rejoined Vale as football advisor and life president, said that "I didn't intend any revenge on Vale... I didn't want to move away from Stoke-on-Trent because the people here are the salt of the earth".

Those in bold were actually full-time managers at both clubs.

Manager	Port Vale career	Stoke City career
Manager	Span	Span
Micky Adams	2009–2010; 2011–2014	1994
Bill Asprey	1967–1968	1984–1985
Alan Bloor	1979	1961–1977
Tom Holford	1919–1924; 1932–1935	1898–1908
Jackie Mudie	1965–1967	1961–1963
Danny Pugh	2017–2020	2007–2012
Bill Rowley	1884–1886	1886–1898
John Rudge	1983–1999	1999–2013
Stanley Matthews	1967–1968	1932–1947; 1961–1965
**Joe Schofield**	1920–1930	1891–1899; 1915–1919
Freddie Steele	1951–1957; 1962–1965	1933–1949
