= Jock Stirling =

Scottish footballer

Personal information
- Full name: John Hamilton Stirling
- Date of birth: 1887
- Place of birth: Clydebank, Scotland
- Date of death: 1924 (aged 36–37)
- Position: Outside right

Senior career*
Years	Team	Apps	(Gls)
1907–1908	Clydebank Juniors		
1908–1911	Clyde	75	(18)
1911–1914	Middlesbrough	103	(8)
1914–1919	Bradford Park Avenue	31	(2)
1917	→ Third Lanark (loan)	3	(0)
1919–1920	Stoke	20	(1)
1920	Coventry City	5	(0)
1920	Dunfermline Athletic		
1920–1924	Alloa Athletic	64	(7)
Total		301	(36)
- * Club domestic league appearances and goals

John Hamilton Stirling (1887–1924) was a Scottish footballer who played in the Football League for Bradford Park Avenue, Coventry City, Middlesbrough and Stoke.

== Career ==
Stirling was born in Clydebank and played for both local side Clydebank Juniors and then for Clyde (where he featured on the losing side in the 1910 Scottish Cup Final) before moving to England with Middlesbrough in 1911. He spent three seasons with the Ayresome Park club under the management of Thomas McIntosh the side finished in 3rd position in the First Division during the 1913–14 season. Stirling left for Bradford Park Avenue where he spent the 1914–15 season before football was halted due to the outbreak of World War I.

After the end of the war Stirling joined Stoke who had just re-gained their Football League status after falling foul of financial mismanagement. He played in 21 matches for Stoke, scoring once against Stockport County in October 1919. He left for Coventry City in March 1920 and played five matches for the Sky Blues before returning to Scotland with Dunfermline Athletic (then playing in the Central League) and Alloa Athletic.

At representative level, he played in the Home Scots v Anglo-Scots annual trial matches in 1912 and 1914 while with Middlesbrough, but never gained a full cap for Scotland. He also played in two editions of the Glasgow FA's annual challenge match against Sheffield while with Clyde.

== Career statistics ==
Appearances and goals by club, season and competition
Club	Season	League			FA Cup		Total	
Club	Season	Division	Apps	Goals	Apps	Goals	Apps	Goals
Middlesbrough	1911–12	First Division	36	3	4	0	40	3
Middlesbrough	1912–13	First Division	33	1	4	0	37	1
Middlesbrough	1913–14	First Division	34	4	1	0	35	4
Middlesbrough	Total		103	8	10	0	112	8
Bradford Park Avenue	1914–15	First Division	31	2	3	0	34	2
Stoke	1919–20	Second Division	20	1	1	0	21	1
Coventry City	1919–20	Second Division	5	0	0	0	5	0
Career total			159	11	14	0	172	11
