= Billy Twemlow =

English footballer

Personal information
- Full name: William Twemlow
- Date of birth: 1892
- Place of birth: Hanley, England
- Date of death: 1 June 1933 (aged 40–41)
- Place of death: Hanley, Stoke-on-Trent, England
- Height: 5 ft 9 in (1.75 m)
- Position: Full-back

Youth career
- Audley
- Sandbach Ramblers

Senior career*
Years	Team	Apps	(Gls)
1919–1921	Stoke	36	(2)
1921–1923	Port Vale	21	(0)
1923–1924	Macclesfield	3	(0)
- Oswestry Town
Total		60+	(2+)
- * Club domestic league appearances and goals

William Twemlow (1892 – 1 June 1933) was an English footballer who played in the English Football League for Port Vale and Stoke City. His brother Charlie was also a footballer.

== Career ==
=== Stoke ===
Twemlow played for Audley and Sandbach Ramblers before he joined Stoke in 1915. He played for Stoke during World War I, featuring once in 1915–16, six times in 1916–17, 37 times in 1917–18, and 26 times in 1918–19. Having been a first-time regular during the war, once League football was resumed in 1919, he was first choice full-back under manager Arthur Shallcross. In 1919–20 he played 34 times, scoring twice both penalties against Bristol City in November and Bury in February. However, he lost his place to the veteran Tom Brittleton and only played three matches in 1920–21 and was released from his contract at the Victoria Ground at the end of the campaign.

=== Later career ===
He remained in the Second Division, as he joined local rivals Port Vale in August 1921. He was a regular in his debut season at the Old Recreation Ground, but picked up a cartilage injury in 1922 and was sidelined. After an operation to fix it he was only selected a further four times before he was released at the end of the 1922–23 season. He moved on to Macclesfield, where he played alongside his brother, and then Oswestry Town.

== Career statistics ==
Appearances and goals by club, season and competition
Club	Season	League			FA Cup		Total	
Club	Season	Division	Apps	Goals	Apps	Goals	Apps	Goals
Stoke	1919–20	Second Division	33	2	1	0	34	2
Stoke	1920–21	Second Division	3	0	0	0	3	0
Stoke	Total		36	2	1	0	37	2
Port Vale	1921–22	Second Division	18	0	1	0	19	0
Port Vale	1922–23	Second Division	3	0	0	0	3	0
Port Vale	Total		21	0	1	0	22	0
Macclesfield	1923–24	Cheshire County League	3	0	0	0	3	0
Career total			60	2	2	0	62	2
