= Billy Harrison (footballer, born 1886) =

English footballer

Personal information
- Full name: William Ewart Harrison
- Date of birth: 27 December 1886
- Place of birth: Wybunbury, Cheshire, England
- Date of death: August 1948 (age 61)
- Place of death: Wolverhampton, England
- Height: 5 ft 4 1/2 in (1.64 m)
- Position: Outside right

Youth career
- Hough United
- Crewe South End
- Willaston White Star

Senior career*
Years	Team	Apps	(Gls)
1905–1907	Crewe Alexandra	?	(?)
1907–1920	Wolverhampton Wanderers	317	(43)
1920–1922	Manchester United	44	(5)
1922–1923	Port Vale	22	(2)
1923–1924	Wrexham	29	(0)
Total		412	(45)

International career
	Football League	2	(?)
- * Club domestic league appearances and goals

William Ewart Harrison (27 December 1886 – August 1948) was an English footballer who played at outside right.

After a spell with Crewe Alexandra, he spent 1907 to 1920 with Wolverhampton Wanderers, the FA Cup in his first season there. He was later inducted into the club's Hall of Fame. He spent 1920 to 1922 with Manchester United, and later had one-season spells with Port Vale and Wrexham.

== Career ==
Harrison played for Hough United, Crewe South End, Willaston White Star and Crewe Alexandra before signing for fellow Second Division side Wolverhampton Wanderers for a £400 fee in summer 1907. His first season with the club ended in FA Cup glory, as they won the trophy after defeating Newcastle United 3–1 in the final, with Harrison scoring a fine individual goal. He remained at Molineux for nine full seasons, and 345 games in total.

During World War I he guested for Stoke. He played seven times for the Potters in 1915–16, 31 times in 1916–17, 33 times in 1917–18, and 28 times in 1918–19, scoring a total of 17 goals at the Victoria Ground. Stoke enjoyed some measure of success in the war leagues, finishing as runners-up of the Lancashire Section Secondary Competition Group D in 1916–17, champions of the Lancashire Section Primary Competition in 1917–18, and runners-up in both the Primary Competition and Group C in 1918–19. He returned to Wanderers for the 1919–20 season, as the club posted a 19th-place finish.

Harrison moved to Manchester United in October 1920. He went on to score five goals in 46 appearances for the Red Devils, helping United to finish 13th in 1920–21, before they suffered relegation out of the First Division in 1921–22. He left Old Trafford and joined Second Division rivals Port Vale in September 1922. He enjoyed a positive start to the 1922–23 campaign, scoring the only goal of the game against former club Manchester United at the Old Recreation Ground. He was a first-team regular until an ankle injury in October 1922 put him out of action until January 1923. He regained his spot but was sold to Wrexham for £300 in June of that year. He helped the Dragons to a 16th-place finish in the Third Division North in 1923–24, before he departed the Racecourse Ground at the age of 38.

== Post-retirement ==
After retiring from football, Harrison was a pub landlord in Tettenhall, Wolverhampton. He had 10 children, and his wife gave birth to triplets on the day of the 1908 FA Cup final. He died in August 1948, aged 61.

== Career statistics ==
Appearances and goals by club, season and competition
Club	Season	League			FA Cup		Total	
Club	Season	Division	Apps	Goals	Apps	Goals	Apps	Goals
Wolverhampton Wanderers	1907–08	Second Division	31	4	7	2	38	6
Wolverhampton Wanderers	1908–09	Second Division	35	3	2	0	37	3
Wolverhampton Wanderers	1909–10	Second Division	35	7	2	1	37	8
Wolverhampton Wanderers	1910–11	Second Division	33	9	3	0	36	9
Wolverhampton Wanderers	1911–12	Second Division	38	6	4	1	42	7
Wolverhampton Wanderers	1912–13	Second Division	34	3	2	0	36	3
Wolverhampton Wanderers	1913–14	Second Division	35	6	3	0	38	6
Wolverhampton Wanderers	1914–15	Second Division	35	1	2	1	37	2
Wolverhampton Wanderers	1919–20	Second Division	31	3	3	1	34	4
Wolverhampton Wanderers	1920–21	Second Division	10	1	0	0	10	1
Wolverhampton Wanderers	Total		317	43	28	6	345	49
Manchester United	1920–21	First Division	23	3	2	0	25	3
Manchester United	1921–22	First Division	21	2	0	0	21	2
Manchester United	Total		44	5	2	0	46	5
Port Vale	1922–23	Second Division	22	2	0	0	22	2
Wrexham	1923–24	Third Division North	29	0	2	0	31	0
Career total			412	50	32	6	444	56

== Honours ==
Wolverhampton Wanderers

- FA Cup: 1908

Stoke

- Lancashire Section Primary Competition: 1917–18
