= Albert Howell (cricketer) =

English cricketer

Albert Louis Howell (26 July 1898 – 26 July 1958) was an English cricketer who played first-class cricket for Warwickshire between 1919 and 1922. He was born in Ladywood, Birmingham and died at Wingrove, Newcastle upon Tyne. He was the younger brother of the England Test player Harry Howell.

Like this brother, Albert Howell was a right-arm bowler, though he was described as fast-medium rather than fast. He made a few first-class appearances for Warwickshire in 1919 and 1920, but was a fairly regular member of the team in 1921, his best season, when he took 31 wickets at the, for the time, rather high average of 32.61 runs per wicket. The season included his only five-wicket haul, figures of five wickets for 65 runs in the second innings of the match against Middlesex at Lord's. He was not successful in 1922 and did not play for the county after that season.

Howell moved to North-East England and between 1926 and 1936 he played in Minor Counties cricket for Durham, at that stage not a first-class county team. At this level of cricket, he was highly effective and in 1929 he was picked for the Minor Counties representative team that met Lancashire in a first-class fixture: the match was ruined by rain and Howell failed to take a wicket, but it was his last first-class cricket appearance.

He died on his 60th birthday.

After the First World War he played football for Hednesford Town, in 1920-21 he played four matches (one goal) for Coventry City in the Football League Second Division before moving to Jarrow F.C.
