= Bert Crossthwaite =

English footballer (1887–1944)

Personal information
- Full name: Herbert Crossthwaite
- Date of birth: 4 April 1887
- Place of birth: Preston, England
- Date of death: 20 May 1944 (aged 67)
- Place of death: Birmingham, England
- Height: 5 ft 9 3/4 in (1.77 m)
- Position: Goalkeeper

Senior career*
Years	Team	Apps	(Gls)
19??–1905	Preston Post Office		
1905–1906	Preston North End	0	(0)
1906–1907	Blackpool	1	(0)
1907–1909	Fulham	2	(0)
1909–1910	Exeter City	41	(0)
1910–1914	Birmingham	49	(0)
1914–1915	Stoke	0	(0)
- * Club domestic league appearances and goals

Herbert Crossthwaite (4 April 1887 – 20 May 1944) was an English footballer who played as a goalkeeper for Blackpool, Fulham and Birmingham in the Football League and for Exeter City in the Southern League.

== Sporting career ==
Crossthwaite played football for Preston Post Office before signing amateur forms with Football League First Division club Preston North End, but made no senior appearances for that club. Having turned professional, he did play one match in the Football League for their West Lancashire rivals Blackpool, in the Second Division away to Gainsborough Trinity on 29 September 1906. Crossthwaite joined Fulham for a £15 fee ahead of the 1907–08 season, and made two more Second Division appearances in the second half of that campaign, standing in for first-choice goalkeeper Leslie Skene on each occasion. He was retained for 1908–09, but took no further part in the first team, and signed for Southern League club Exeter City in 1909. He missed only one Southern League match in the 1909–10 season.

He then moved to Birmingham, joined the police, and was reinstated as an amateur. He returned to football with Birmingham in 1911, for which he played 49 Second Division games, most of which came in a spell from October 1912 to New Year's Day 1914. He later signed for Stoke, before retiring from the game in around 1915.

After retiring as a player, he became a referee, and officiated in matches up to Football League level. He was also a competent sprinter, despite being a heavy man, and was for many years actively involved with the charity sports meetings organised by the Birmingham police.

== Personal life ==
Herbert Crossthwaite was born on 4 April 1887 in Preston, Lancashire, to Thomas Crossthwaite, a general labourer, and his wife Esther, a cotton operative. The 1901 United Kingdom Census records him as a postal telegraph messenger. He married Agnes Carter in 1909, and the couple had two children, Ann and Herbert.

Crossthwaite joined the Birmingham City Police in September 1910, giving his previous occupation as that of postman. His police file describes him as 5 ft 9 3/4 in (1.77 m) tall, of dark complexion with dark brown hair and eyes. He was promoted to sergeant in 1917 and to inspector in 1925, spending much of his career serving in the Chief Constable's office, specialising in entertainment tax enforcement before such work was taken over by the Inland Revenue. He was a recipient of the King's Silver Jubilee Medal in 1935, and retired from the police later that year having completed his 25 years' service.

The 1939 Register finds him living with his family in the Erdington district of Birmingham and working part-time as a nightwatchman. On 20 May 1944, at the age of 57, he collapsed and died in Erdington.

A cousin, Harry Crossthwaite, played League football for Stockport County and Stoke.

== Sources ==
- Matthews, Tony (1995). Birmingham City: A Complete Record. Derby: Breedon Books. ISBN 978-1-85983-010-9.
