= Harry Howell (cricketer) =

English cricketer and footballer (1890-1932)

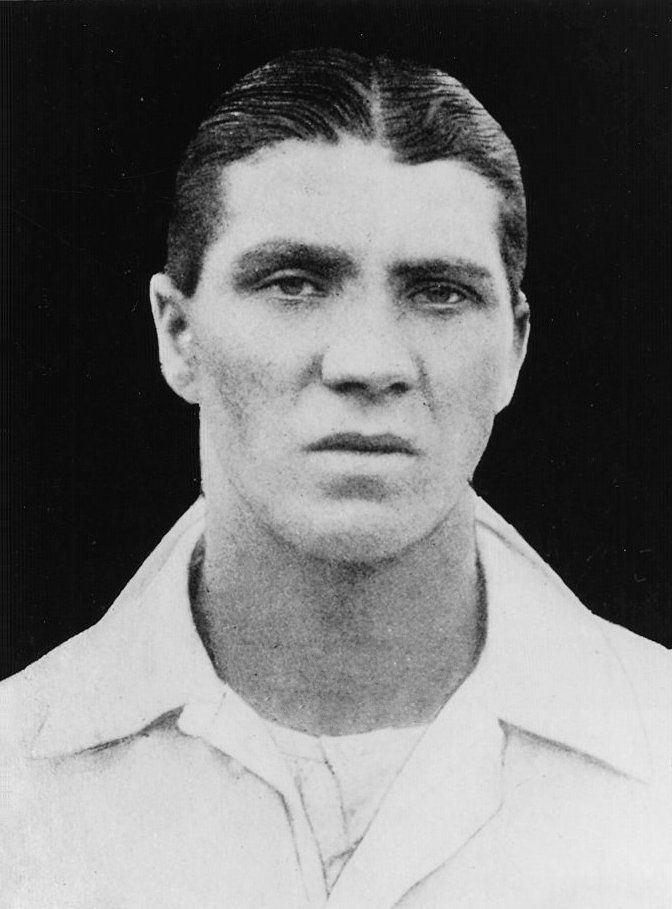

Personal information
- Full name: Henry Howell
- Born: 29 November 1890; Hockley, Warwickshire, England
- Died: 9 July 1932 (aged 41); Selly Oak, Warwickshire, England
- Batting: Right-handed
- Bowling: Right-arm fast

International information
- National side: England (1920–1924)
- Test debut (cap 185): 31 December 1920 v Australia
- Last Test: 16 August 1924 v South Africa

Career statistics
Competition	Test	First-class
Matches	5	227
Runs scored	15	1,679
Batting average	7.50	7.80
100s/50s	0/0	0/0
Top score	5	36
Balls bowled	918	43,112
Wickets	7	975
Bowling average	79.85	21.23
5 wickets in innings	0	75
10 wickets in match	0	18
Best bowling	4/115	10/51
Catches/stumpings	0/–	67/–
- Source: CricInfo, 28 June 2019
Association football career
- Height: 5 ft 8 in (1.73 m)
- Position: Inside forward
Senior career*
Years	Team	Apps	(Gls)
- Burslem Swifts
1913–1920	Wolverhampton Wanderers	38	(6)
1920–1921	Southampton	0	(0)
1921–1922	Northfleet		
1922–1923	Accrington Stanley	3	(0)
- Mansfield Town
- * Club domestic league appearances and goals

Henry Howell (29 November 1890 – 9 July 1932) was an English footballer and cricketer who played five cricket Test matches from 1920 to 1924. He also played professional football for Wolverhampton Wanderers, Stoke, Port Vale, Southampton, Northfleet, Accrington Stanley, and Mansfield Town.

== Cricket career ==
Born in Hockley, Warwickshire, Howell was a right-arm fast bowler and right-handed batsman who played county cricket for Warwickshire. In 1922, he helped his side to restrict Hampshire to just 15 runs in one innings; Howell took six wickets for just seven runs. He took 152 first-class wickets in the 1923 season, including the first ten-wicket haul in an innings for a Warwickshire bowler.

He played five Tests for England. His first Test was at the MCG during England's 1920–21 Ashes series with Australia. His last Test appearance was in August 1924 at The Oval against South Africa. He took seven wickets in his Test career. His younger brother Albert also played for Warwickshire between 1919 and 1922.

== Football career ==
Howell played for Burslem Swifts and Wolverhampton Wanderers during World War I, as well as guesting for both Stoke and Port Vale. At Stoke he played in the 1916–17 and 1917–18 seasons, where he made 57 appearances, scoring 42 goals. He scored a hat-trick past Manchester City in a 5–0 win at the Victoria Ground on 9 April 1917, and then again hit a hat-trick in a 9–0 home win over Burnley on 16 March 1918. Despite only being a guest, he was Port Vale's top-scorer during the 1918–19 season with nine goals in eleven appearances.

He returned to "Wolves" in the summer of 1919. He later was signed to Southampton (without making any first-team appearances), Northfleet, Accrington Stanley (on trial) and Mansfield Town. He made a total of 38 Football League appearances with Wolves and three with Accrington Stanley.

Howell died on 9 July 1932 in Selly Oak, Birmingham.

== Football career statistics ==
Appearances and goals by club, season and competition
Club	Season	League			FA Cup		Total	
Club	Season	Division	Apps	Goals	Apps	Goals	Apps	Goals
Wolverhampton Wanderers	1913–14	Second Division	15	0	3	2	18	2
Wolverhampton Wanderers	1914–15	Second Division	12	4	0	0	12	4
Wolverhampton Wanderers	1919–20	Second Division	11	2	0	0	11	2
Wolverhampton Wanderers	Total		38	6	3	2	41	8
Southampton	1920–21	Third Division South	0	0	0	0	0	0
Accrington Stanley	1922–23	Third Division North	3	0	0	0	3	0
Career total			41	6	3	2	44	8
