= Wilf Phillips =

English footballer

Personal information
- Full name: Wilfred John Phillips
- Date of birth: 27 August 1895
- Place of birth: Bradley, Staffordshire, England
- Date of death: 14 March 1976 (aged 80)
- Position: Forward

Senior career*
Years	Team	Apps	(Gls)
1918	Bilston United		
1919–1920	Stoke	13	(3)
1920–1921	Ebbw Vale		
1921–1922	Darlaston		
1922–1923	Bilston United		
1923–1925	Bristol Rovers	90	(35)
1925–1930	Millwall	109	(58)
1930–1931	Thames	35	(7)
1931–1932	West Ham United	21	(3)
1932–1933	Clapton Orient	24	(4)
1933	Stourbridge		
Total		292	(110)
- * Club domestic league appearances and goals

Wilfred John Phillips (27 August 1895 – 14 March 1976) was an English footballer who played in the Football League for Bristol Rovers, Millwall, Clapton Orient, Thames, West Ham United and Stoke.

== Career ==
Phillips was born in Bradley, Staffordshire, and played non-league football with Bilston United before joining Football League side Stoke in 1919. He played 14 matches for the "Potters" scoring three goals which included a brace against Coventry City on Boxing day. However manager Arthur Shallcross was seemingly unimpressed by Phillips's performance during the 1919–20 season and he was released by the club. He went on to play for Ebbw Vale, Darlaston and made a return to Bilston United before he re-entered League football with Bristol Rovers in 1923. He had an impressive first season at Rovers scoring 23 goals in 42 games and in December 1925 he joined league rivals Millwall for £500. Phillips became a prolific forward for the "Lions" and his 27 goals in 1927–28 helped Millwall to claim the Third Division South title.

After scoring 62 goals in 119 matches for Millwall he joined the short lived Thames in June 1930, and then signed for West Ham United, for another £500 fee, in May 1931. He scored on his Irons debut, a 4–2 victory against Blackburn Rovers at Ewood Park. His single season at Upton Park saw relegation to the Second Division. He then joined Clapton Orient before returning to his native Midlands and played for Stourbridge.

== Career statistics ==
Appearances and goals by club, season and competition
Club	Season	League			FA Cup		Total	
Club	Season	Division	Apps	Goals	Apps	Goals	Apps	Goals
Stoke	1919–20	Second Division	13	3	1	0	14	3
Bristol Rovers	1923–24	Third Division South	42	23	2	1	44	24
Bristol Rovers	1924–25	Third Division South	36	9	4	2	40	11
Bristol Rovers	1925–26	Third Division South	12	3	1	0	13	3
Bristol Rovers	Total		90	35	7	3	97	38
Millwall	1925–26	Third Division South	6	0	0	0	6	0
Millwall	1926–27	Third Division South	29	15	5	2	34	17
Millwall	1927–28	Third Division South	39	27	1	0	40	27
Millwall	1928–29	Second Division	22	11	3	1	25	12
Millwall	1929–30	Second Division	13	5	1	1	14	6
Millwall	Total		109	58	10	4	119	62
Thames	1930–31	Third Division South	35	7	0	0	35	7
West Ham United	1931–32	First Division	21	3	2	0	23	3
Clapton Orient	1932–33	Third Division South	24	4	0	0	24	4
Career total			292	110	20	7	312	117

== Honours ==
- Football League Third Division South champion: 1927–28
