= Bill Charnley =

English footballer

Personal information
- Full name: William Charnley
- Date of birth: 1895
- Place of birth: Kirkham, England
- Position: Winger

Senior career*
Years	Team	Apps	(Gls)
1919	Aberdeen		
1919–1920	Stoke	2	(0)
1920	Musselburgh		
- * Club domestic league appearances and goals

William Charnley (born 1895) was an English footballer who played in the Football League for Stoke.

== Career ==
Charnley was born in Kirkham, Lancashire but began his football career with Scottish side Aberdeen. His only appearance for the Dons came in a 2–1 friendly win against Albion Rovers. He joined Stoke in 1919 and played twice in the Football League. He failed to break into the first team and was released, he returned north of the border to Musselburgh.

== Career statistics ==
Appearances and goals by club, season and competition
Club	Season	League			FA Cup		Total	
Club	Season	Division	Apps	Goals	Apps	Goals	Apps	Goals
Stoke	1919–20	Second Division	2	0	0	0	2	0
Career total			2	0	0	0	2	0
