= George Jarvis (footballer) =

Scottish footballer

Personal information
- Full name: George Henry Jarvis
- Date of birth: 3 December 1889
- Place of birth: Glasgow, Scotland
- Date of death: 1969 (aged 79–80)
- Position: Centre forward

Senior career*
Years	Team	Apps	(Gls)
1911	Benburb		
1911	Cambuslang Rangers		
1912–1919	Celtic	7	(0)
1913	→ Motherwell (loan)		
1913–1914	→ Vale of Leven (loan)	1	(0)
1914	→ Ayr United (loan)	6	(0)
1914	→ Clyde (loan)		
1915	→ St Mirren (loan)	1	(0)
1915–1916	→ Falkirk (loan)	5	(0)
1917	→ Stevenston United (loan)		
1917–1918	→ Clydebank (loan)	6	(4)
1919–1920	Stoke	32	(10)
1921	Clydebank	8	(1)
1922	Dunfermline Athletic	3	(0)
1922	Ayr United		
1923	Ayr Fort		
Total		39	(10)
- * Club domestic league appearances and goals

George Henry Jarvis (3 December 1889 – 1969) was a Scottish footballer who played in the Football League for Stoke.

== Career ==
Born in Glasgow, Jarvis started his football career at Scottish Junior sides Glasgow Benburb and Cambuslang Rangers before joining Celtic. He spent most of his at Celtic time out on loan at a number of clubs including Motherwell, Vale of Leven, Ayr United, Clyde, St Mirren, Falkirk and Stevenston United.

Jarvis joined English Football League club Stoke in 1919 where he played at centre forward during the 1919–20 season and he went on to score ten goals. He returned to Scotland with in 1921 Clydebank after suffering from homesickness. He went on to play for Dunfermline Athletic, Ayr United and Ayr Fort.

== Career statistics ==
Appearances and goals by club, season and competition
Club	Season	League			FA Cup		Total	
Club	Season	Division	Apps	Goals	Apps	Goals	Apps	Goals
Celtic	1914–15	Scottish Division One	7	0	0	0	7	0
Stoke	1919–20	Second Division	30	10	1	0	31	10
Stoke	1920–21	Second Division	2	0	0	0	2	0
Stoke	Total		32	10	1	0	33	10
Career total			39	10	1	0	40	10
