= David Boxley =

English footballer

Personal information
- Full name: David Boxley
- Date of birth: 17 June 1890
- Place of birth: Cradley Heath, England
- Date of death: 1941 (aged 51)
- Position: Forward

Senior career*
Years	Team	Apps	(Gls)
1914	Cradley Heath St Luke's		
1919–1920	Stoke	8	(4)
1920	Dudley Town		
- * Club domestic league appearances and goals

David Boxley (17 June 1890 – 1941) was an English footballer who played in the Football League for Stoke.

== Career ==
Boxley was born in Cradley Heath and played for Cradley Heath St Luke's before joining Stoke in 1919. He played a few times for Stoke during World War I and then eight matches in the Football League in 1919–20 where he scored four goals. He later played for Dudley Town.

== Career statistics ==
Club	Season	League			FA Cup		Total	
Club	Season	Division	Apps	Goals	Apps	Goals	Apps	Goals
Stoke	1919–20	Second Division	8	4	0	0	8	4
Career total			8	4	0	0	8	4
