= Jack Maddock =

English footballer (1896-1972)

Personal information
- Date of birth: 24 November 1896
- Place of birth: Audley, Staffordshire, England
- Date of death: 27 October 1972 (aged 75)
- Place of death: Normacot, Stoke-on-Trent, England
- Height: 5 ft 11 in (1.80 m)
- Position: Right-back

Youth career
- Bignall End
- Audley

Senior career*
Years	Team	Apps	(Gls)
1919–1921	Stoke	23	(4)
1921–1923	Macclesfield Town	6	(0)
1923–1931	Port Vale	173	(10)
1931–1933	Crewe Alexandra	41	(6)
- Nantwich
- Audley United
Total		243	(20)
- * Club domestic league appearances and goals

John Maddock (24 November 1896 – 27 October 1972) was an English footballer, noted for his 'rifle shot'. He played in the right-back position for Stoke between 1919 and 1921 before signing with Port Vale following two years at Macclesfield Town. He spent eight years with Vale before joining Crewe Alexandra in 1931. He later played for non-League sides Nantwich and Audley United. He won the Third Division North title with Port Vale in 1929–30.

== Career ==
Maddock played for local teams Bignall End and Audley before being spotted by Stoke. He played for them during the war years, playing three games in 1916–17, 23 games in 1917–18, and 14 games in 1918–19. He then established himself in the right-back role as the Second Division continued after the war. He scored three goals, all penalties at the Victoria Ground, in 15 games in the 1919–20 campaign. After making eight appearances in the 1920–21 season, a serious knee injury seemingly ended his career. Unable to continue working in his former role as a carpenter in his father's factory, let alone play professional football, he spent 75 guineas of his money to pay for surgery to remove his damaged cartilage; the operation was a success, and allowed him to make occasional appearances for Macclesfield Town.

Spotted in August 1923 playing cricket by Joe Schofield, former Stoke secretary now secretary of Second Division Port Vale, Maddock was given a trial with the club. He impressed and played 21 league games in the 1923–24 season, converting one penalty . He again scored one penalty in 21 league games in the 1924–25 season. He became a key first-team player in the 1925–26 season, converting five penalties in 30 league and cup games; this tally included a goal in a 3–2 defeat to Manchester United in the FA Cup. He scored three goals in 42 appearances in the 1926–27 season, though lost his touch from the penalty spot as he accomplished the dubious feat of missing two penalties in one game against Nottingham Forest on 18 December, as Vale lost 2–0 at the Old Recreation Ground. He scored two penalties in 35 matches in the 1927–28 campaign, before featuring 25 times in the 1928–29 relegation season. He lost his place in the side by April 1929. He featured just four times as the "Valiants" won the Third Division North title 1929–30. After just three appearances in the 1930–31 season, he was transferred to Crewe Alexandra in July 1931. He helped the "Railwaymen" to finish sixth and tenth in the Third Division North in 1931–32 and 1932–33, and scored six goals in 43 league and cup games at Gresty Road. He later played for Nantwich and Audley United.

== Career statistics ==
Appearances and goals by club, season and competition
Club	Season	League			FA Cup		Total	
Club	Season	Division	Apps	Goals	Apps	Goals	Apps	Goals
Stoke	1919–20	Second Division	15	3	0	0	15	3
Stoke	1920–21	Second Division	8	1	0	0	8	1
Stoke	Total		23	4	0	0	23	4
Macclesfield Town	1922–23	Cheshire County League	6	0	0	0	6	0
Port Vale	1923–24	Second Division	21	1	0	0	21	1
Port Vale	1924–25	Second Division	21	1	2	0	23	1
Port Vale	1925–26	Second Division	29	4	1	1	30	5
Port Vale	1926–27	Second Division	39	3	2	0	41	3
Port Vale	1927–28	Second Division	32	1	3	1	35	2
Port Vale	1928–29	Second Division	24	0	1	0	25	0
Port Vale	1929–30	Third Division North	4	0	0	0	4	0
Port Vale	1930–31	Second Division	3	0	0	0	3	0
Port Vale	Total		173	10	9	2	182	12
Crewe Alexandra	1931–32	Third Division North	21	3	2	0	23	3
Crewe Alexandra	1932–33	Third Division North	20	3	0	0	20	3
Crewe Alexandra	Total		41	6	2	0	43	6
Career total			243	20	11	2	254	22

== Honours ==
Port Vale

- Football League Third Division North: 1929–30
