= James Martin (footballer, born 1898) =

English footballer (1898–1969)

Personal information
- Full name: James Colin Martin
- Date of birth: 2 December 1898
- Place of birth: Stoke-upon-Trent, England
- Date of death: 1969 (aged 70–71)
- Position: Forward

Senior career*
Years	Team	Apps	(Gls)
1914–1918	Stoke St Peter's		
1918–1919	Basford		
1919–1920	Stoke	16	(1)
1921–1923	Aberdare Athletic	76	(34)
1923–1924	Wolverhampton Wanderers	11	(6)
1924–1925	Reading	18	(2)
1925–1926	Aberdare Athletic	39	(16)
1926–1927	Bristol City	40	(16)
1928	Blackpool	4	(2)
1928–1929	Southend United	3	(1)
1929–1930	Halifax Town	18	(4)
1930	Congleton Town		
Total		225	(82)
- * Club domestic league appearances and goals

James Colin Martin (2 December 1898 – 1969) was a footballer who played in the Football League for Aberdare Athletic, Blackpool, Bristol City, Halifax Town, Reading, Southend United, Wolverhampton Wanderers and Stoke.

== Career ==
Martin was born in Stoke-upon-Trent started his career with local clubs Stoke St Peter's and Basford before joining Football League club Stoke in 1919. He played 19 matches for the club and scored just the one goal which came in a 2–0 win over Nottingham Forest in the 1919–20 season. He left in 1921 and joined Welsh side Aberdare Athletic where he impressed scoring 34 goals in 76 league matches, this prompted Wolverhampton Wanderers to sign Martin in 1923. He struggled to settle at Wolves left for Reading before re-joining Aberdare and then on to Bristol City.

Martin joined Harry Evans' Blackpool in 1928. He made his debut for the club on 6 October, in a 4–2 victory at Clapton Orient, scoring two of the visitors' goals. He played in the three games that followed, before being sold to Southend United. He then played for Halifax Town before ending his career with Congleton Town.

== Career statistics ==
Appearances and goals by club, season and competition
Club	Season	League			FA Cup		Total	
Club	Season	Division	Apps	Goals	Apps	Goals	Apps	Goals
Stoke	1919–20	Second Division	13	1	0	0	13	1
Stoke	1920–21	Second Division	3	0	0	0	3	0
Aberdare Athletic	1921–22	Third Division South	35	16	0	0	35	16
Aberdare Athletic	1922–23	Third Division South	37	17	6	2	43	19
Aberdare Athletic	1923–24	Third Division South	4	1	0	0	4	1
Wolverhampton Wanderers	1923–24	Third Division North	11	6	0	0	11	6
Reading	1924–25	Third Division South	18	2	2	1	20	3
Aberdare Athletic	1925–26	Third Division South	39	16	1	0	40	16
Bristol City	1926–27	Third Division South	23	11	2	1	25	12
Bristol City	1927–28	Second Division	17	5	1	1	18	6
Blackpool	1928–29	Third Division South	4	2	0	0	4	2
Southend United	1928–29	Third Division South	3	1	0	0	3	1
Halifax Town	1929–30	Third Division North	18	4	0	0	18	4
Career Total			225	82	12	5	237	87
