= Harry Wootton =

English footballer

Personal information
- Full name: Harold Wootton
- Date of birth: 1896
- Place of birth: Hanley, England
- Date of death: 1964 (aged 68)
- Height: 5 ft 9 in (1.75 m)
- Position: Defender

Senior career*
Years	Team	Apps	(Gls)
- Stafford Rangers
1919–1920	Stoke	1	(0)
1920–1923	Stafford Rangers		
1923–1927	Crewe Alexandra	132	(0)
Total		133	(0)
- * Club domestic league appearances and goals

Harold "Harry" Wootton (1896–1964) was an English footballer who played in the Football League for Crewe Alexandra and Stoke.

== Career ==
Wootton started his career at Stafford Rangers before being signed by Second Division side Stoke just after World War I. He played just a single match for Stoke which came in a 2–0 defeat at home to Nottingham Forest in January 1920. He then re-joined Stafford where he spent three years before re entering league football with Crewe Alexandra, he was successful at Crewe as he made 132 league appearances in four years.

== Career statistics ==
Appearances and goals by club, season and competition
Club	Season	League			FA Cup		Total	
Club	Season	Division	Apps	Goals	Apps	Goals	Apps	Goals
Stoke	1919–20	Second Division	1	0	0	0	1	0
Crewe Alexandra	1923–24	Third Division North	25	0	0	0	25	0
Crewe Alexandra	1924–25	Third Division North	33	0	2	0	35	0
Crewe Alexandra	1925–26	Third Division North	17	0	4	0	21	0
Crewe Alexandra	1926–27	Third Division North	31	0	2	0	33	0
Crewe Alexandra	1927–28	Third Division North	26	0	5	0	31	0
Career total			133	0	13	0	146	0
