= Joe Jones (footballer) =

Welsh footballer

Personal information
- Full name: Joseph Thomas Jones
- Date of birth: 9 January 1887
- Place of birth: Rhosymedre, Wales
- Date of death: 23 July 1941 (aged 54)
- Place of death: Stoke-on-Trent, England
- Height: 5 ft 11 in (1.80 m)
- Positions: Half-back; defender

Senior career*
Years	Team	Apps	(Gls)
- Cefn Albion
–	Wrexham		
–	Treharris		
1911–1920	Stoke	123	(12)
1920–1921	Crystal Palace	61	(6)
1922–1923	Coventry City	50	(1)
1924	Crewe Alexandra	15	(1)
1925	Wellington St George's		
Total		249	(20)

International career
1912–1922	Wales	15	(0)
- * Club domestic league appearances and goals

Joseph Thomas Jones (9 January 1887 – 23 July 1941) was a Welsh footballer who played in the Football League for Stoke, Crystal Palace, Coventry City and Crewe Alexandra. He also made 15 appearances for the Wales national team.

== Career ==
Jones, who was born in Rhosymedre, Wales, was one of a select band of footballers who appeared for a club before, during and after the First World War. Jones spent ten years with Stoke making almost 130 senior appearances and 133 during the war. Described as a solid uncompromising, yet bustling-type of a defender with a fantastic heading ability who had a great enthusiasm for the game. He became captain for both club and country, and helped Stoke to re-gain their English Football League status in 1914–15 and also finish runners-up of the Lancashire Football section in 1917–18 and 1918–19 before leaving to join Crystal Palace. At Palace he helped the club become champions of the Third Division, in its inaugural season in 1920–21, making 25 appearances and scoring four goals. After a further 36 appearances ( two goals) the next season, he moved on to Coventry City in July 1922 and subsequently to Crewe Alexandra.

After heading a ball Jones lost his sight in one eye causing him to retire. He later ran a snooker hall and a bookshop for the blind before his death in 1941.

== Career statistics ==
=== Club ===
Club	Season	League			FA Cup		Total	
Club	Season	Division	Apps	Goals	Apps	Goals	Apps	Goals
Stoke	1911–12	Southern League Division One	31	2	1	0	32	2
Stoke	1912–13	Southern League Division One	30	0	2	0	32	0
Stoke	1913–14	Southern League Division Two	23	4	0	0	23	4
Stoke	1914–15	Southern League Division Two	24	3	3	0	27	3
Stoke	1919–20	Second Division	15	3	0	0	15	3
Stoke	Total		123	12	6	0	129	12
Crystal Palace	1920–21	Third Division South	25	4	2	0	27	4
Crystal Palace	1921–22	Second Division	36	2	3	0	39	2
Crystal Palace	Total		61	6	5	0	66	6
Coventry City	1922–23	Second Division	36	1	1	0	37	1
Coventry City	1923–24	Second Division	14	0	2	0	16	0
Coventry City	Total		50	1	3	0	53	1
Crewe Alexandra	1923–24	Third Division North	15	1	1	0	16	1
Career Total			249	20	15	0	264	20

=== International ===
National team	Year	Apps	Goals
Wales	1912	3	0
Wales	1913	2	0
Wales	1914	2	0
Wales	1920	3	0
Wales	1921	2	0
Wales	1922	3	0
Total		15	0
