= Albert Ellis (footballer) =

English footballer

Personal information
- Full name: Albert Ellis
- Date of birth: 1889
- Place of birth: Manchester, England
- Date of death: 1961 (aged 72)
- Place of death: Manchester, England
- Position: Forward

Senior career*
Years	Team	Apps	(Gls)
–	Salford United		
1913–1914	Stoke	3	(0)
1914–19??	Witton Albion		
- * Club domestic league appearances and goals

Albert Ellis (1889–1961) was an English footballer who played for Stoke.

== Career ==
Ellis was born in Manchester and played amateur football with Salford United before joining Stoke in 1910. He played in three first-team matches for Stoke during the 1913–14 season before returning to amateur football with Witton Albion.

== Career statistics ==
Appearances and goals by club, season and competition
Club	Season	League		FA Cup		Total	
Club	Season	Apps	Goals	Apps	Goals	Apps	Goals
Stoke	1913–14	3	0	0	0	3	0
Career total		3	0	0	0	3	0
