= George Clarke (footballer, born 1894) =

English footballer

Personal information
- Full name: George Clarke
- Date of birth: 3 December 1894
- Place of birth: Nantwich, England
- Date of death: 30 July 1960 (aged 65)
- Place of death: Willaston, England
- Height: 5 ft 9 in (1.75 m)
- Position: Left half

Senior career*
Years	Team	Apps	(Gls)
1912-1914	Nantwich		
1915–1924	Stoke	156	(4)
1925–1926	Crewe Alexandra	2	(0)
Total		158	(4)
- * Club domestic league appearances and goals

George Clarke (3 December 1894 – 30 July 1960) was an English footballer who played in the Football League for Crewe Alexandra and Stoke.

== Career ==
Clarke was born in Nantwich and played for his home town club, Nantwich. He gained a losers' medal for Nantwich in the 1914 Cheshire Senior Cup final defeat to Sandbach Ramblers. Stoke signed Clarke in the summer of 1914 for £125 plus the proceeds of a game between the two sides. He did not appear in the first team however until after World War I. Throughout his career at Stoke he was a part timer combining football with his job of as tailor's cutter. During the war he joined the Liverpool Scottish regiment and was involved in action in France. He was injured, suffering a broken leg but ironically it came playing football for the army.

He recovered and returned to Stoke and became a regular in the side playing in five seasons for the "Potters" helping Stoke gain promotion in 1921–22. He played as a hard working left half whose job was to win back possession of the ball, he did this for Stoke until he broke his leg again, this time in January 1924 against Leeds United in the FA Cup. He never played again for Stoke and spent almost two years out of football before joining Crewe Alexandra. He managed only two matches for Crewe before retiring and became a scout instead.

== Career statistics ==
Club	Season	League			FA Cup		Total	
Club	Season	Division	Apps	Goals	Apps	Goals	Apps	Goals
Stoke	1919–20	Second Division	30	1	1	0	31	1
Stoke	1920–21	Second Division	41	0	1	0	42	0
Stoke	1921–22	Second Division	42	1	5	0	47	1
Stoke	1922–23	First Division	25	0	1	0	26	0
Stoke	1923–24	Second Division	18	2	1	0	19	2
Stoke	Total		156	4	9	0	165	4
Crewe Alexandra	1926–27	Third Division North	2	0	0	0	2	0
Career Total			158	4	9	0	167	4

== Honours ==
Stoke City

- Football League Second Division runner-up: 1921–22
