= Billy Herbert =

English footballer

Personal information
- Full name: William Edward Herbert
- Date of birth: 12 August 1888
- Place of birth: Canning Town, England
- Date of death: 30 September 1928 (aged 39)
- Place of death: Stoke-on-Trent, England
- Height: 5 ft 8 1/2 in (1.74 m)
- Position: Inside right

Senior career*
Years	Team	Apps	(Gls)
–	Walthamstow Grange		
–	Barnet Alston		
1909	Woolwich Arsenal	0	(0)
1910–1911	Glossop	17	(3)
1911	Gravesend United		
1912–1919	Stoke	58	(23)
1919–1921	Bolton Wanderers	34	(7)
1921–1922	Wigan Borough	24	(6)
Total		133	(39)
- * Club domestic league appearances and goals

William Edward Herbert (12 August 1888 – 30 September 1928) was an English footballer who played for Bolton Wanderers, Glossop, Stoke and Wigan Borough.

== Career ==
Herbert was born in Canning Town and began his career with Walthamstow Grange, Barnet Alston and an unsuccessful spell at Woolwich Arsenal before joining Second Division side Glossop North End in 1910. He played 18 times for Glossop scoring three goals and after a short spell with Gravesend United he joined Southern League side Stoke in December 1912. He helped the club again re-election to the Football League in 1914–15 and played for Stoke during World War I. He played 11 times for Stoke in their return to the League in 1919–20 but then signed for Bolton Wanderers in November 1919. He spent two and a half years at Burnden Park before ending his career with a season at Wigan Borough.

Following a long illness, he died in Stoke aged 39 and was buried at Hartshill Cemetery.

== Career statistics ==
Club	Season	League			FA Cup		Total	
Club	Season	Division	Apps	Goals	Apps	Goals	Apps	Goals
Glossop	1910–11	Second Division	6	1	0	0	6	1
Glossop	1911–12	Second Division	11	2	1	0	12	2
Glossop	Total		17	3	1	0	18	3
Stoke	1912–13	Southern League Division One	16	5	2	0	18	5
Stoke	1913–14	Southern League Division Two	24	13	3	3	27	16
Stoke	1914–15	Southern League Division Two	7	2	4	2	11	4
Stoke	1919–20	Second Division	11	3	0	0	11	3
Stoke	Total		58	23	9	5	67	28
Bolton Wanderers	1919–20	First Division	21	5	1	0	22	5
Bolton Wanderers	1920–21	First Division	12	2	0	0	12	2
Bolton Wanderers	1921–22	First Division	1	0	0	0	1	0
Bolton Wanderers	Total		34	7	1	0	35	7
Wigan Borough	1921–22	Third Division North	24	6	0	0	24	6
Career total			133	39	11	5	144	44
