= Charlie Parker (footballer) =

English footballer (1891–1969)

Personal information
- Full name: Charles William Parker
- Date of birth: 1 September 1891
- Place of birth: Seaham, England
- Date of death: 1969 (aged 78)
- Place of death: Chingford, England
- Height: 5 ft 9 in (1.75 m)
- Position: Half back

Senior career*
Years	Team	Apps	(Gls)
1911	Seaham Albion		
1912	Seaham Harbour		
1913	Hartlepool BD		
1913–1920	Stoke	74	(4)
1920–1928	Sunderland	245	(12)
1929–1930	Carlisle United	9	(1)
1930	Blyth Spartans		
1931	Chopwell Institute		
Total		328	(17)
- * Club domestic league appearances and goals

Charles William Parker (1 September 1891 – 1969) was an English footballer who played in the Football League for Carlisle United, Stoke and Sunderland.

== Club career ==
Parker was born in Seaham and played for local clubs Seaham Albion, Seaham Harbour and Hartlepool BD before joining Stoke in 1913. He soon became popular with the club's supporters and he helped Stoke re-gain their League status in 1914–15. He remained with Stoke through World War I and was a key member of the Stoke squad for their return to the Football League in 1919–20 as the played in 35 matches. However, in October 1920 he was sold to First Division, Sunderland by manager Arthur Shallcross which prompted and angry reaction by the fans who believed that it was an unnecessary sale of a popular player.

He signed for Sunderland from Stoke City for £3,300 in 1920, and made his debut for Sunderland against Bradford City on 23 October 1920 in a 2–2 draw at Valley Parade. He was appointed as club captain in 1924 as Charlie Buchan left for Arsenal. In total, he made 245 league appearances and scored 12 goals in his time at Sunderland from 1920 to 1929, where he left for Carlisle United to become player-coach. One of his career highlights was to play for England against Wales, at the Victory International on 8 October 1919 at the Victoria Ground, Stoke (England 2–0 Wales).

== Career statistics ==
Appearances and goals by club, season and competition
Club	Season	League			FA Cup		Total	
Club	Season	Division	Apps	Goals	Apps	Goals	Apps	Goals
Stoke	1913–14	Southern League Division Two	9	0	0	0	9	0
Stoke	1914–15	Southern League Division Two	22	1	4	1	26	2
Stoke	1919–20	Second Division	34	2	1	0	35	2
Stoke	1920–21	Second Division	9	1	0	0	9	1
Stoke	Total		74	4	5	1	79	5
Sunderland	1920–21	First Division	31	3	1	0	32	3
Sunderland	1921–22	First Division	39	4	0	0	39	4
Sunderland	1922–23	First Division	39	1	2	0	41	1
Sunderland	1923–24	First Division	22	0	1	0	23	0
Sunderland	1924–25	First Division	40	3	3	0	43	3
Sunderland	1925–26	First Division	30	1	4	0	34	1
Sunderland	1926–27	First Division	22	0	0	0	22	0
Sunderland	1927–28	First Division	13	0	0	0	13	0
Sunderland	1928–29	First Division	9	0	0	0	9	0
Sunderland	Total		245	12	11	0	256	12
Carlisle United	1929–30	Third Division North	9	1	0	0	9	1
Career total			328	17	16	1	344	18

== Honours ==
Stoke

- Southern League Division Two champions: 1914–15
