= Arthur Watkin =

English footballer (1895–1972)

Personal information
- Full name: Arthur Watkin
- Date of birth: 30 July 1895
- Place of birth: Burslem, England
- Date of death: 27 August 1972 (aged 77)
- Place of death: Stoke-on-Trent, England
- Height: 5 ft 10 in (1.78 m)
- Position: Centre forward

Senior career*
| Years | Team | Apps | (Gls) |
| 1912 | Hanley Swifts | | |
| 1913–1923 | Stoke | 142 | (58) |
| 1923–1924 | Congleton Town | | |
| 1924–1927 | Stoke City | 16 | (3) |
| 1928 | Congleton Town | | |
| Total | | 158 | (61) |
- * Club domestic league appearances and goals

Arthur Watkin (30 July 1895 – 27 August 1972) was an English footballer who played in the Football League for Stoke. His brother Frank Watkin was also a footballer who played for Stoke.

== Career ==
Watkin was born in Burslem and joined Stoke in 1913 from Hanley Swifts. The 18-year-old was a regular during 1914–15 and his 24 goals in 20 games propelled Stoke to the Southern League Division Two title. He scored three hat tricks and also hit five twice firstly in a 10–0 victory against Ebbw Vale and in an 11–0 FA Cup win against Stourbridge which helped Stoke re-claim their place in the Football League. The outbreak of World War I interrupted his career but he did return in 1919–20. A long-standing knee injury prevented Watkin living up to expectations surrounding him and he scored three goals in eleven matches taking over from the ailing Bob Whittingham. He scored on his Football League debut which was in the Potteries derby against Port Vale, Watkin scoring a 3–0 victory.

Stoke spent heavily before the start of the 1920–21 season, signing centre forward Jimmy McColl from Celtic. Manager Arthur Shallcross moved Watkin to inside-left where he developed into a tricky linkman between McColl and Harry Crossthwaite. Watkin still retained his eye for goal, top scoring with 16. Of his hat tricks early on against Nottingham Forest the Sentinel's Nimrod wrote: "Stoke followers have waited patiently for a glimpse of the real Watkin and they were rewarded by an exhibition which very few forwards can surpass. How the mind went back to season 1914–15, when he struck terror to the hearts of opposing defenders." But dreams of promotion faded and Watkin's goals tailed off and Stoke were almost relegated. By this time Watkin had developed a reputation for either scoring two or three in a game or being anonymous. Some reporters believed that his experiences in the army had given him a nervous temperament. Watkin also had problems combining football with his job as a pottery department manager at Grimwade's. Once Stoke were relegated his company pressured him into quitting Stoke and he duly spent a season with Congleton Town. New Stoke manager Tom Mather brought him back for a short spell in 1924. Watkin worked as a full-time manager at the pot bank until retirement and he died on 27 August 1972.

== Career statistics ==
| Club | Season | League | | | FA Cup | | Total | |
| Club | Season | Division | Apps | Goals | Apps | Goals | Apps | Goals |
|---|---|---|---|---|---|---|---|---|
| Stoke City | 1913–14 | Southern Division Two | 7 | 1 | 0 | 0 | 7 | 1 |
| Stoke City | 1914–15 | Southern Division Two | 20 | 24 | 4 | 7 | 24 | 31 |
| Stoke City | 1919–20 | Second Division | 11 | 3 | 1 | 0 | 12 | 3 |
| Stoke City | 1920–21 | Second Division | 35 | 15 | 1 | 1 | 36 | 16 |
| Stoke City | 1921–22 | Second Division | 35 | 8 | 5 | 5 | 40 | 13 |
| Stoke City | 1922–23 | First Division | 34 | 7 | 2 | 0 | 36 | 7 |
| Stoke City | 1924–25 | Second Division | 14 | 3 | 1 | 0 | 15 | 3 |
| Stoke City | 1925–26 | Second Division | 2 | 0 | 0 | 0 | 2 | 0 |
| Career Total | | | 158 | 61 | 14 | 13 | 172 | 74 |

== Honours ==
- Southern League Division Two champion: 1914–15
- Football League Second Division runners-up: 1921–22
