= Brittleton =

Brittleton is a surname. Notable people with the surname include:

== English professional footballers ==
- John Brittleton (1906–1982), played for Aston Villa F.C. and son of Tom Brittleton
- Sam Brittleton (1885–1951), brother of Tom Brittleton
- Tom Brittleton (1882–1955), played mostly for Sheffield Wednesday F.C.
