= Jimmy Lee (footballer) =

English footballer

Personal information
- Full name: James Thomas Lee
- Date of birth: 12 April 1892
- Place of birth: Brierley Hill, England
- Date of death: 1955 (aged 63)
- Place of death: Dudley, England
- Height: 5 ft 11 in (1.80 m)
- Position: Goalkeeper

Senior career*
Years	Team	Apps	(Gls)
1914	Cradley Heath St Luke's		
1915–1919	Old Wulfrunians		
1919–1920	Aston Villa	18	(0)
1921–1922	Stoke	21	(0)
1922	Macclesfield		
Total		40	(0)
- * Club domestic league appearances and goals

James Thomas Lee (12 April 1892 – 1955) was a footballer who played in the Football League for Aston Villa and Stoke.

== Career ==
Lee was born in Brierley Hill and played for Cradley Heath and Wulfrunians before joining Aston Villa in 1919. He played 18 times for Villa in two seasons and left for Stoke in 1921. At Stoke he shared goalkeeping duties with Tom Kay and Percy Knott in 1921–22 with Lee playing in 24 matches but he deemed surplus to requirements at the end of the season and was allowed to join Macclesfield.

== Career statistics ==
Appearances and goals by club, season and competition
Club	Season	League			FA Cup		Total	
Club	Season	Division	Apps	Goals	Apps	Goals	Apps	Goals
Aston Villa	1919–20	First Division	8	0	0	0	8	0
Aston Villa	1920–21	First Division	10	0	0	0	10	0
Stoke	1921–22	Second Division	21	0	3	0	24	0
Career total			40	0	3	0	43	0
