= Depledge =

Depledge is a surname. Notable people with the surname include:

- Alex Depledge (fl. 2003–2017), British technology entrepreneur
- Joseph Depledge (1897–1974), English footballer
- Robert Depledge (1882–1930), English footballer
