= George Lennon (footballer) =

Scottish footballer (1889–1984)

Personal information
- Full name: George Ferguson Lennon
- Date of birth: 24 May 1889
- Place of birth: Kilwinning, Scotland
- Date of death: 1984 (aged 94–95)
- Place of death: Kilwinning, Scotland
- Height: 5 ft 8 1/2 in (1.74 m)
- Position: Right back

Senior career*
Years	Team	Apps	(Gls)
1911–1912	Kilwinning Rangers		
1912–1920	Third Lanark	97	(0)
1912	→ Forfar Athletic (loan)		
1913	→ Abercorn (loan)	12	(0)
1915	→ Ayr United (loan)	0	(0)
1920	St Mirren	15	(0)
1920–1923	Luton Town	107	(0)
1923–1924	Stoke	3	(0)
1924–1925	Weymouth		
1925–1926	Bristol Rovers	4	(0)
1926	Airdrieonians	0	(0)
1927	Llandudno		
1928	Colwyn Bay		
Total		234	(0)
- * Club domestic league appearances and goals

George Ferguson Lennon (24 May 1889 – 1984) was a Scottish footballer who played in the Football League for Bristol Rovers, Luton Town and Stoke.

== Career ==
Lennon was born in Kilwinning and began his football career with local junior side Kilwinning Rangers. He then played in the Scottish Football League for Third Lanark, Forfar Athletic, Abercorn, St Mirren and Ayr United.

He joined Luton Town in 1920, and spent three seasons with the "Hatters" making 115 League and FA Cup appearances which earned him a move to Stoke in March 1923. He was never fully given a chance as the manager who brought him to the club Arthur Shallcross was sacked in April 1923 and his replacement Jock Rutherford left the club after just four weeks. Tom Mather was appointed Stoke manager in October 1924 and gave Lennon his chance to impress at full back in a match away at Crystal Palace, but he was "ran ragged" by Palace's Welsh international Frank Hoddinott who got a hat-trick as Stoke lost 5–1. Lennon was then told he should leave the club.

He spent a season with Weymouth before playing four matches for Bristol Rovers in 1925–26. According to available statistics, he never scored a goal in official matches during his 15-year career.

== Career statistics ==
Appearances and goals by club, season and competition
Club	Season	League			FA Cup		Total	
Club	Season	Division	Apps	Goals	Apps	Goals	Apps	Goals
Luton Town	1920–21	Third Division South	37	0	4	0	41	0
Luton Town	1921–22	Third Division South	39	0	3	0	42	0
Luton Town	1922–23	Third Division South	31	0	1	0	32	0
Luton Town	Total		107	0	8	0	115	0
Stoke	1922–23	First Division	2	0	0	0	2	0
Stoke	1923–24	Second Division	1	0	0	0	1	0
Stoke	Total		3	0	0	0	3	0
Bristol Rovers	1925–26	Third Division South	4	0	0	0	4	0
Career Total			114	0	8	0	122	0
