= Tom Brittleton =

English footballer

Personal information
- Full name: John Thomas Brittleton
- Date of birth: 23 April 1882
- Place of birth: Winsford, Cheshire, England
- Date of death: 22 February 1955 (aged 72)
- Place of death: Winsford, Cheshire, England
- Height: 5 ft 10 in (1.78 m)
- Position: Wing half

Youth career
- 1892–1894: Winsford Juniors
- 1894–1896: Winsford Celtic

Senior career*
Years	Team	Apps	(Gls)
1896–1902	Winsford United		
1902–1905	Stockport County	59	(15)
1905–1920	Sheffield Wednesday	343	(30)
1920–1925	Stoke	114	(5)
1925–1928	Winsford United		
Total		516	(50)

International career
1912–1914	England	5	(0)

Managerial career
- 1925–????: Winsford United (Player-manager)
- * Club domestic league appearances and goals

John Thomas Brittleton (23 April 1882 – 22 February 1955) was a professional footballer. He was one of the pioneers of the long throw-in. With a career spanning over 30 years, including 24 seasons in the Football League, he is the oldest person to play for Sheffield Wednesday in a competitive game.

== Early years ==
Brittleton was born in Winsford, Cheshire on St George's Day 1882. He started his football career by playing for Winsford Juniors at the age of 10. Whilst at his next junior club, Winsford Celtic, he played in every position including goalkeeper.

After leaving school at the age of 14, Brittleton signed for the town's senior side, Winsford United. He went on to play many County League games and earned several winners medals in the Cheshire Amateur Cup, appearing in three district finals in one season.

Whilst at United, a Stockport County fan, who was visiting his girlfriend in Winsford, watched Brittleton play a match and informed the Stockport management of his skills. Shortly afterwards he signed amateur forms with County at the age of nineteen. He continued his job at the Winsford Salt Works, and even, on one occasion, missed a Stockport game that he was due to play in so that he could instead play for Winsford in a Cheshire Amateur Cup game. Despite his apparent lack of commitment to County he eventually signed professional forms with the club and hence started his Football League career.

== Professional career ==
=== Stockport County ===
Brittleton began his league career with Stockport County in 1902 as an inside forward. He went on to score ten goals in forty-five appearances for the Lancashire club, and after County had played a game at Ashton in December 1904, the referee sent a report to Sheffield Wednesday recommending the player. Wednesday immediately sent a £200 bid to Stockport which was rejected. Undeterred, the Owls improved their offer to a club record fee of £300, and Brittleton signed for the Yorkshire club on 6 January 1905.

=== Sheffield Wednesday ===
Brittleton made his debut for Wednesday on 14 January 1905, playing in the inside right position in place of Harry Chapman. During his early time at The Owlerton Stadium, Brittleton played in most of the outfield positions before becoming established as a wing-half and a long-term replacement for Harry Ruddlesdin.

Brittleton played in all of Sheffield Wednesday's matches in the 1906–07 FA Cup, culminating in the club's 2–1 victory against Everton in the final at Crystal Palace.

In 1911, Brittleton was invited to represent the Football Association for a summer tour of South Africa. However, the player, once described as "the biggest home bird you could ever meet", declined, preferring instead to spend the off-season fishing.

Brittleton made his international debut on 10 February 1912 at the age of 29 in a match against Ireland which England won 6–1. He won four more international caps, and did not lose a game that he played for his country.

In 1919, Wednesday allowed Brittleton to move back to Winsford, although he continued to play for the club. He went on to make a total of 373 appearances for the Owls in all competitions, scoring 33 goals in the process. His last match for Sheffield Wednesday was against Oldham Athletic on 1 May 1920; aged 38 years and 8 days, Brittleton became the oldest man to play for the Owls. After more than 15 years with the club he was rewarded with a free transfer.

=== Stoke ===
After looking set to re-join non-league Winsford United, Brittleton moved to Second Division Stoke. Brittleton family folklore has it that he actually signed for Winsford before moving almost immediately to Stoke and that the Cheshire club received a small transfer as part of the deal, however no records have been found to back up the claim. He joined Stoke at the age of 41 and many questioned as to Brittleton could still play a part in professional football. However, despite his advancing years he still commanded respect and was indeed able to play as through he was in his twenties. Due to his experience he was appointed player-coach at Stoke working alongside Arthur Shallcross. He helped Stoke gain promotion to the First Division in 1921–22 but Stoke struggled the following season and Shalcross was sacked. Jock Rutherford took over but soon left and Brittleton was given the opportunity to become manager but he rejected. Instead he carried on playing in the 1924–25 season playing in eight matches at the age of 45, a record not to be surpassed until Stanley Matthews.

=== Return to Winsford ===
After retiring from League football Brittleton returned to his hometown to take up the position of player-manager at Winsford United whilst also working for ICI. When he finally stopped playing, he became the landlord of the town's Navigation Inn.

== Personal life ==
His younger brother, Sam (born 1885), was also a professional footballer with Stockport County, Preston North End and Southampton.

His son, John (1906–1982), played for Aston Villa for three seasons in the 1920s.

== Career statistics ==
=== Club ===
Appearances and goals by club, season and competition
Club	Season	League			FA Cup		Total	
Club	Season	Division	Apps	Goals	Apps	Goals	Apps	Goals
Stockport County	1902–03	Second Division	16	4	0	0	16	4
Stockport County	1903–04	Second Division	29	6	3	0	32	6
Stockport County	1904–05	Lancashire Combination	14	5	5	0	19	5
Stockport County	Total		59	15	8	0	67	15
Sheffield Wednesday	1904–05	First Division	12	3	0	0	12	3
Sheffield Wednesday	1905–06	First Division	19	3	1	0	20	3
Sheffield Wednesday	1906–07	First Division	31	1	8	0	39	1
Sheffield Wednesday	1907–08	First Division	36	6	1	0	37	6
Sheffield Wednesday	1908–09	First Division	33	4	4	1	37	5
Sheffield Wednesday	1909–10	First Division	32	6	2	0	34	6
Sheffield Wednesday	1910–11	First Division	32	1	0	0	32	1
Sheffield Wednesday	1911–12	First Division	29	2	2	0	31	2
Sheffield Wednesday	1912–13	First Division	34	0	4	1	38	1
Sheffield Wednesday	1913–14	First Division	30	1	5	1	35	2
Sheffield Wednesday	1914–15	First Division	24	1	2	0	26	1
Sheffield Wednesday	1919–20	First Division	31	2	1	0	32	2
Sheffield Wednesday	Total		343	30	30	3	373	33
Stoke	1920–21	Second Division	41	4	1	0	42	4
Stoke	1921–22	Second Division	14	0	5	0	19	0
Stoke	1922–23	First Division	16	1	2	0	18	1
Stoke	1923–24	Second Division	35	0	1	0	36	0
Stoke	1924–25	Second Division	8	0	0	0	8	0
Stoke	Total		114	5	9	0	123	5
Career Total			516	50	47	3	563	53

=== International ===
National team	Year	Apps	Goals
England	1912	3	0
England	1913	1	0
England	1914	1	0
Total		5	0
