= Edwin Steventon =

English footballer

Personal information
- Full name: Edwin Herbert Steventon
- Date of birth: 16 August 1891
- Place of birth: Nantwich, England
- Date of death: 1961 (aged 70)
- Position: Goalkeeper

Senior career*
Years	Team	Apps	(Gls)
- Walsall
- Wednesbury Old Athletic
- Southampton
1914	Aston Villa	0	(0)
- Nantwich Victoria
1920–1921	Stoke	3	(0)
–	Nantwich Victoria		
1922	Wolverhampton Wanderers	0	(0)
- * Club domestic league appearances and goals

Edwin Herbert Steventon (16 August 1891 – 1961) was an English footballer who played in the Football League for Stoke.

== Career ==
Steventon was born in Nantwich and played for Walsall, Wednesbury Old Athletic, Southampton, Aston Villa and Nantwich Victoria before joining Stoke in 1920. He played three matches for Stoke at the end of the 1920–21 season in place of Percy Knott. At the end of the season he re-joined Nantwich Victoria and served as back up 'keeper at Wolverhampton Wanderers in 1922.

== Career statistics ==
Appearances and goals by club, season and competition
Club	Season	League			FA Cup		Total	
Club	Season	Division	Apps	Goals	Apps	Goals	Apps	Goals
Stoke	1920–21	Second Division	3	0	0	0	3	0
Career Total			3	0	0	0	3	0
