= Bert Ralphs =

English footballer

Personal information
- Full name: Bertram Victor Ralphs
- Date of birth: 27 August 1896
- Place of birth: Handsworth, England
- Date of death: 14 November 1942 (aged 46)
- Place of death: Birmingham, England
- Height: 5 ft 8 1/2 in (1.74 m)
- Position: Outside forward

Senior career*
Years	Team	Apps	(Gls)
1913	Dennison's		
1914	Reading		
1919	Nuneaton		
1919–1921	Blackburn Rovers	40	(6)
1922–1925	Stoke	92	(6)
1926–1927	Chesterfield	32	(7)
1927–1929	Crewe Alexandra	61	(4)
1929	Stafford Rangers		
1930	Colwyn Bay		
1931	Northwich Victoria		
Total		224	(23)
- * Club domestic league appearances and goals

Bertram Victor Ralphs (27 August 1896 – 14 November 1942) was an English footballer who played in the Football League for Blackburn Rovers, Chesterfield, Crewe Alexandra and Stoke.

== Career ==
Ralphs had an interesting career as a 'fast and enterprising winger' who occasionally played as in inside-forward. He began playing football just before World War I with his works team Dennison's before he turned out for Reading and Nuneaton. After the end of the conflict Ralphs turned professional and signed for Blackburn Rovers. He played in 40 league matches scoring six goals for Rovers before being signed by Stoke in 1922. His first season with the "Potters" ended in disappointment as the club suffered relegation from the First Division. He spent the next season as back up to Tommy Broad before establishing himself as first choice right winger and was an ever-present during the 1924–25 season. He spent one more season with Stoke before leaving for Chesterfield in 1926. He later went on to play for Crewe Alexandra and Stafford Rangers.

== Personal life ==
Ralphs served as a private in the Royal Army Medical Corps during the First World War.

== Career statistics ==
Appearances and goals by club, season and competition
Club	Season	League			FA Cup		Total	
Club	Season	Division	Apps	Goals	Apps	Goals	Apps	Goals
Blackburn Rovers	1920–21	First Division	16	2	0	0	16	2
Blackburn Rovers	1921–22	First Division	24	4	1	0	25	4
Blackburn Rovers	Total		40	6	1	0	41	6
Stoke	1922–23	First Division	22	1	1	0	23	1
Stoke	1923–24	Second Division	12	0	0	0	12	0
Stoke	1924–25	Second Division	42	2	1	0	43	2
Stoke	1925–26	Second Division	16	3	2	0	18	3
Stoke	Total		92	6	4	0	96	6
Chesterfield	1926–27	Third Division North	32	7	3	1	35	8
Crewe Alexandra	1927–28	Third Division North	42	4	5	1	47	5
Crewe Alexandra	1928–29	Third Division North	15	0	1	0	16	1
Crewe Alexandra	Total		61	4	6	1	67	5
Career total			225	23	14	2	239	25
