= Kacher =

Kacher is a surname. Notable people with the surname include:

- Artyom Kacher (born 1988), Russian singer
- Delton Kacher (born 1938), American guitarist and inventor
- Fred Kacher (born 1968), American navy admiral
- Mastanabal Kacher (born 1995), Algerian footballer

== See also ==
- Kasher (surname)
