= Gilbert Brookes =

English footballer (1895–1952)

Personal information
- Full name: Gilbert Henry Brookes
- Date of birth: 2 April 1895
- Place of birth: Kidderminster, England
- Date of death: 1952 (aged 57)
- Height: 6 ft 1 in (1.85 m)
- Position: Goalkeeper

Senior career*
Years	Team	Apps	(Gls)
1920–1921	Kidderminster Harriers		
1921–1922	Shrewsbury Town		
1922–1923	Stoke	12	(0)
1923–1924	Swansea Town	37	(0)
1924–1925	Luton Town	42	(0)
1925–1926	Merthyr Town	38	(0)
1926	Kidderminster Harriers		
- * Club domestic league appearances and goals

Gilbert Henry Brookes (2 April 1895 – 1952) was an English footballer who played in the Football League for Luton Town, Merthyr Town, Swansea Town and Stoke.

== Career ==
Brookes was born in Kidderminster and played for his local club Kidderminster Harriers and then Shrewsbury Town before joining First Division Stoke in 1922. He played 12 top tier matches for Stoke in 1922–23 but with Stoke heading for relegation he lost his place in the side to Leslie Scott. He left Stoke at the end of the season and went on to play for Third Division South sides Swansea Town, Luton Town and Merthyr Town before making a return to Kidderminster Harriers.

== Career statistics ==
Appearances and goals by club, season and competition
Club	Season	League			FA Cup		Total	
Club	Season	Division	Apps	Goals	Apps	Goals	Apps	Goals
Stoke	1922–23	First Division	12	0	2	0	14	0
Swansea Town	1923–24	Third Division South	37	0	4	0	41	0
Luton Town	1924–25	Third Division South	42	0	1	0	43	0
Merthyr Town	1925–26	Third Division South	38	0	1	0	39	0
Career total			129	0	8	0	137	0
