= Leslie Scott =

Leslie Scott may refer to:

- Sir Leslie Scott (British politician) (1869–1950), British politician, Conservative MP 1910–1929, Solicitor-General 1922
- Leslie M. Scott (1878–1968), American historian and politician in Oregon
- Leslie Scott (footballer) (1895–1973), English footballer, goalkeeper for A.F.C. Sunderland
- Leslie Scott (archaeologist) (1913–1970), British archaeologist
- Les Scott (born 1947), Australian politician
- Leslie Scott (game designer) (born 1955), British-Tanzanian creator of the game Jenga
- Leslie Scott, American clarinettist with the Steve Reich Ensemble

== See also ==
- Lesley Scott, screenwriter
