= 1922–23 Stoke F.C. season =

Stoke
1922–23 season
- Chairman: Mr E.Reynish
- Manager: Arthur Shallcross, Jock Rutherford
- Stadium: Victoria Ground
- Football League First Division: 21st (30 Points)
- FA Cup: Second Round
- Top goalscorer: League: Jimmy Broad (23); All: Jimmy Broad (26)
- Highest home attendance: 44,000 vs Sunderland (26 December 1922)
- Lowest home attendance: 10,000 vs Nottingham Forest (31 March 1923)
- Average home league attendance: 19,450
Home colours

The 1922–23 season was Stoke's 23rd season in the Football League and the 19th in the First Division.

With Stoke's achievements last season they found themselves back in the First Division for the first time since 1907; however it would prove to be a short stay. In their opening eight matches, Stoke collected just two points and found themselves bottom of the table. Despite spending money on improving the squad, results were still poor and manager Arthur Shallcross was sacked in April 1923. He was replaced with former England international Jock Rutherford, but he was unable to avoid relegation. Rutherford then completed the shortest managerial spell in the club's history as a heated argument with the directors led him to resign just four weeks into his tenure.

== Season review ==
=== League ===
With the club's First Division ambitions achieved, there was more than the usual air of optimism for the 1922–23 season, but things did not go according to plan and from their opening eight matches, Stoke claimed just two points (both draws) and found themselves anchored to the bottom of the table. Stoke's first win of the season came away at West Bromwich Albion when Harry Davies scored the only goal in his second appearance. Again the director's ambition and determination to maintain First Division status showed through with the arrivals of Joe Kasher and Bert Ralphs to name a few. This belated heavy expenditure on players cost the finance's dearly, but good crowds were able to cover the cost. Unfortunately relegation was not avoided and Stoke made an instant return to the Second Division.

Former England international Jock Rutherford was appointed manager of Stoke in April 1923, taking over from Arthur Shallcross who had served the club for the previous four years. However his stay was brief and after a heated row with directors the quickly left leaving Stoke without a manager going into the 1923–24 season.

=== FA Cup ===
In the Cup Stoke beat Blyth Spartans 3–0 in the first round before being knocked out 3–1 to Bury.

== Final league table ==
Pos	Team	Pld	W	D	L	GF	GA	GAv	Pts	Relegation
18	Middlesbrough	42	13	10	19	57	63	0.905	36	
19	Chelsea	42	9	18	15	45	53	0.849	36	
20	Nottingham Forest	42	13	8	21	41	70	0.586	34	
21	Stoke (R)	42	10	10	22	47	67	0.701	30	Relegation to the Second Division
22	Oldham Athletic (R)	42	10	10	22	35	65	0.538	30	Relegation to the Second Division

Source: World Football
Rules for classification: 1) Points; 2) Goal average; 3) Goals scored
(R) Relegated

== Results ==
Stoke's score comes first

=== Legend ===
Win	Draw	Loss

=== Football League First Division ===
Match	Date	Opponent	Venue	Result	Attendance	Scorers
1	26 August 1922	Oldham Athletic	A	1–4	19,000	Groves
2	28 August 1922	Chelsea	H	1–2	20,000	Watkin
3	2 September 1922	Oldham Athletic	H	2–2	25,000	J Broad (2)
4	4 September 1922	Chelsea	A	2–3	20,000	J Broad (2)
5	9 September 1922	Huddersfield Town	H	2–2	22,000	J Broad, Watkin
6	13 September 1922	Birmingham	A	0–2	20,000	
7	16 September 1922	Huddersfield Town	A	0–1	10,000	
8	23 September 1922	West Bromwich Albion	H	0–2	20,000	
9	30 September 1922	West Bromwich Albion	A	1–0	25,000	Davies
10	7 October 1922	Manchester City	H	1–1	20,000	J Broad
11	14 October 1922	Manchester City	A	1–2	18,000	J Broad
12	21 October 1922	Sheffield United	A	0–2	10,000	
13	28 October 1922	Sheffield United	H	4–0	15,000	Davies (2), J Broad, Nicholas
14	4 November 1922	Bolton Wanderers	A	1–1	12,000	J Broad
15	11 November 1922	Bolton Wanderers	H	2–0	16,000	J Broad, Seddon (o.g.)
16	18 November 1922	Blackburn Rovers	H	1–1	18,000	T Broad
17	2 December 1922	Cardiff City	A	1–2	20,000	J Broad
18	9 December 1922	Cardiff City	H	3–1	10,000	J Broad (pen) (2), Tempest
19	16 December 1922	Middlesbrough	A	1–3	5,000	Tempest
20	23 December 1922	Middlesbrough	H	0–0	15,112	
21	26 December 1922	Sunderland	H	1–2	44,000	J Broad
22	30 December 1922	Arsenal	A	0–3	16,000	
23	1 January 1923	Sunderland	A	0–2	30,000	
24	6 January 1923	Arsenal	H	1–0	22,000	Brittleton
25	20 January 1923	Everton	A	0–4	23,000	
26	22 January 1923	Blackburn Rovers	A	5–1	10,000	J Broad (3), Nicholas, Ralphs
27	27 January 1923	Everton	H	4–1	15,000	J Broad, Nicholas, Watkin (2)
28	8 February 1923	Preston North End	A	2–4	12,000	J Broad (2)
29	10 February 1923	Preston North End	H	4–2	10,000	J Broad (pen) (3), Davies
30	17 February 1923	Aston Villa	A	0–6	20,000	
31	24 February 1923	Aston Villa	H	1–1	19,850	Watkin
32	3 March 1923	Burnley	A	2–3	10,000	Davies, Eyres
33	10 March 1923	Burnley	H	0–1	20,000	
34	17 March 1923	Tottenham Hotspur	H	0–0	20,000	
35	24 March 1923	Tottenham Hotspur	A	1–3	28,000	Watkin
36	31 March 1923	Nottingham Forest	H	0–1	10,000	
37	2 April 1923	Birmingham	H	0–0	20,000	
38	7 April 1923	Nottingham Forest	A	1–0	12,000	Richardson
39	14 April 1923	Newcastle United	H	1–0	20,000	Watkin
40	21 April 1923	Newcastle United	A	0–1	13,000	
41	28 April 1923	Liverpool	H	0–0	18,000	
42	5 May 1923	Liverpool	A	0–1	15,000	

=== FA Cup ===
Round	Date	Opponent	Venue	Result	Attendance	Scorers
R1	13 January 1923	Blyth Spartans	A	3–0	9,121	J Broad (2), Nicholas
R2	3 February 1923	Bury	A	1–3	32,000	J Broad

== Squad statistics ==
Pos.	Name	League		FA Cup		Total	
Pos.	Name	Apps	Goals	Apps	Goals	Apps	Goals
GK	(England) Gilbert Brookes	12	0	2	0	14	0
GK	(Scotland) Kenny Campbell	8	0	0	0	8	0
GK	(England) Bob Dixon	2	0	0	0	2	0
GK	(England) Leslie Scott	20	0	0	0	20	0
DF	(England) Tommy Howe	6	0	0	0	6	0
DF	(Scotland) George Lennon	2	0	0	0	2	0
DF	(Scotland) Bob McGrory	32	0	2	0	34	0
DF	(England) Alec Milne	36	0	2	0	38	0
DF	(England) Tommy Weston	4	0	0	0	4	0
MF	(England) Ewart Beswick	3	0	0	0	3	0
MF	(England) Tom Brittleton	16	1	2	0	18	1
MF	(England) Harry Brough	12	0	0	0	12	0
MF	(England) George Clarke	25	0	1	0	26	0
MF	(England) Joe Kasher	29	0	2	0	31	0
MF	(England) Billy Poole	6	0	0	0	6	0
MF	(England) Vic Rouse	37	0	1	0	38	0
MF	(England) Dickie Smith	1	0	0	0	1	0
FW	(England) Jimmy Broad	30	23	2	3	32	26
FW	(England) Tommy Broad	21	1	1	0	22	1
FW	(England) Harry Davies	24	5	0	0	24	5
FW	(England) Jack Eyres	4	1	0	0	4	1
FW	(England) Fred Groves	13	1	0	0	13	1
FW	(Wales) Dai Nicholas	32	3	2	1	34	4
FW	(England) Joe Pointon	0	0	0	0	0	0
FW	(England) Bert Ralphs	22	1	1	0	23	1
FW	(England) Frank Richardson	8	1	0	0	8	1
FW	(England) Jock Rutherford	0	0	0	0	0	0
FW	(England) Andy Smith	2	0	0	0	2	0
FW	(England) Victor Staley	0	0	0	0	0	0
FW	(England) Billy Tempest	20	2	2	0	22	2
FW	(England) Arthur Watkin	34	7	2	0	36	7
FW	(England) Albert Whitehurst	1	0	0	0	1	0
–	Own goals	–	1	–	0	–	1
