= Dai Nicholas =

Welsh footballer (1897–1982)

Personal information
- Full name: David Sidney Nicholas
- Date of birth: 12 August 1897
- Place of birth: Aberdare, Glamorgan, Wales
- Date of death: 7 April 1982 (aged 84)
- Place of death: Aberdare, Glamorgan, Wales
- Position: Winger

Senior career*
Years	Team	Apps	(Gls)
1919	Merthyr Town		
1919–1920	Swansea Town		
1920–1921	Merthyr Town	46	(2)
1921–1924	Stoke	54	(3)
1924	Aberavon Athletic		
1924–1929	Swansea Town	151	(14)
Total		251	(19)

International career
1921–1927	Wales	3	(0)
- * Club domestic league appearances and goals

David Sidney "Dai" Nicholas (12 August 1897 – 7 April 1982) was a Welsh footballer who played in the English Football League for Merthyr Town, Swansea Town and Stoke.

== Career ==
Nicholas was capped by Wales at schoolboy level in 1912 and he was given trials by Merthyr Town but due to World War I he was recruited by the Royal Navy. Towards the end of the war he played several games as an amateur for Swansea before turning professional with Merthyr, only to enter the Carmarthen Training college to begin training as a teacher. In 1921 he joined Stoke and was a 'speedy winger' who performed well on the wing for Stoke before becoming homesick in 1924. He moved back to Swansea Town and also became a teacher in his native Aberdare.

== Career statistics ==
=== Club ===
Appearances and goals by club, season and competition
Club	Season	League			FA Cup		Total	
Club	Season	Division	Apps	Goals	Apps	Goals	Apps	Goals
Merthyr Town	1920–21	Third Division South	17	1	3	0	20	1
Merthyr Town	1921–22	Third Division South	29	1	3	0	32	1
Merthyr Town	Total		46	2	6	0	52	2
Stoke	1921–22	Second Division	6	0	0	0	6	0
Stoke	1922–23	First Division	32	3	2	1	34	4
Stoke	1923–24	Second Division	9	0	1	0	10	0
Stoke	1924–25	Second Division	7	0	0	0	7	0
Stoke	Total		54	3	3	1	57	4
Swansea Town	1924–25	Third Division South	19	2	0	0	19	2
Swansea Town	1925–26	Second Division	25	4	7	2	32	6
Swansea Town	1926–27	Second Division	34	2	5	0	39	2
Swansea Town	1927–28	Second Division	37	2	1	0	38	2
Swansea Town	1928–29	Second Division	31	2	2	0	33	2
Swansea Town	1929–30	Second Division	5	2	0	0	5	2
Swansea Town	Total		151	14	15	2	166	16
Career Total			251	19	24	3	275	22

=== International ===
National team	Year	Apps	Goals
Wales	1923	1	0
Wales	1927	2	0
Total		3	0
