= Sam Johnson (footballer, born 1901) =

English footballer

Personal information
- Full name: Samuel Johnson
- Date of birth: 19 October 1901
- Place of birth: Kidsgrove, England
- Date of death: 1975 (aged 73–74)
- Positions: Left back; left half

Senior career*
Years	Team	Apps	(Gls)
1924–1926	Stoke	38	(0)
1926–1929	Swindon Town	35	(1)
1929–1933	York City	124	(0)
1933	Southport	1	(0)
1933	Crystal Palace	0	(0)
–	Scarborough		
Total		198	(1)
- * Club domestic league appearances and goals

Samuel Johnson (19 October 1901 – 1975) was an English footballer.

== Career ==
Johnson started his career with Stoke in 1924. After making 38 league appearances for the club, he joined Swindon Town in 1926. He joined York City in the summer of 1929, prior to their first season in the Football League, after making 35 appearances and scoring one goal in the league for Swindon. He made 137 appearances for the club and joined Southport in 1933. After making one league appearance for the club, he joined Crystal Palace in the same year. He joined Scarborough after making no league appearances for Palace.

== Career statistics ==
Appearances and goals by club, season and competition
Club	Season	League			FA Cup		Total	
Club	Season	Division	Apps	Goals	Apps	Goals	Apps	Goals
Stoke City	1924–25	Second Division	8	0	0	0	8	0
Stoke City	1925–26	Second Division	30	0	2	0	32	0
Swindon Town	1926–27	Third Division South	13	1	0	0	13	1
Swindon Town	1927–28	Third Division South	11	0	0	0	11	0
Swindon Town	1928–29	Third Division South	11	0	0	0	11	0
York City	1929–30	Third Division North	37	0	6	0	43	0
York City	1930–31	Third Division North	36	0	5	0	41	0
York City	1931–32	Third Division North	38	0	1	0	39	0
York City	1932–33	Third Division North	13	0	1	0	14	0
Southport	1933–34	Third Division North	1	0	0	0	1	0
Career Total			198	1	15	0	213	1
