= John Roxburgh (footballer) =

Scottish footballer

Personal information
- Full name: John Roxburgh
- Date of birth: 10 November 1901
- Place of birth: Granton, Scotland
- Date of death: 29 March 1977 (aged 75)
- Height: 5 ft 6 in (1.68 m)
- Position: Winger

Senior career*
Years	Team	Apps	(Gls)
1918	Edinburgh Emmett		
1919–1920	Rugby Town		
1920–1922	Leicester City	48	(2)
1922–1923	Aston Villa	12	(3)
1923–1924	Stoke	14	(1)
1924–1926	Sheffield United	5	(2)
1927	Sheffield		
1928	Leicester Normads		
Total		79	(8)
- * Club domestic league appearances and goals

John Roxburgh (10 November 1901 – 29 March 1977) was a Scottish footballer who played in the Football League for Aston Villa, Leicester City, Sheffield United and Stoke.

== Career ==
Roxburgh began his career with Edinburgh Emmett before joining English non-league side Rugby Town. He impressed enough to earn a move to Leicester City where he was a regular for two seasons. He joined Aston Villa in 1922 and then moved on to Stoke. At the Victoria Ground Roxburgh played 14 matches scoring once against Stockport County in a 1–0 in February 1924. At the end of the 1923–24 season he moved on again this time to Sheffield United and then Sheffield and Leicester Normads. He was once actually selected for an England amateur international against Wales in March 1926 before his birthplace was made known to the FA. He made his Scottish debut in the 1926–27 season. Roxburgh went on to top around 80 League appearances for his four senior clubs. He appeared alongside his brother Andy for 5 games in the Leicester City senior team.

== Career statistics ==
Appearances and goals by club, season and competition
Club	Season	League			FA Cup		Total	
Club	Season	Division	Apps	Goals	Apps	Goals	Apps	Goals
Leicester City	1920–21	Second Division	22	1	1	1	23	2
Leicester City	1921–22	Second Division	20	1	1	0	21	1
Leicester City	1922–23	Second Division	6	0	0	0	6	0
Leicester City	Total		48	2	2	1	50	3
Aston Villa	1922–23	First Division	12	3	0	0	12	3
Stoke	1923–24	Second Division	14	1	0	0	14	1
Sheffield United	1925–26	First Division	2	1	0	0	2	1
Sheffield United	1926–27	First Division	3	1	0	0	3	1
Sheffield United	Total		5	2	0	0	5	2
Career total			79	8	2	1	81	9
