= Charles Kelly (footballer) =

English footballer

Personal information
- Full name: Charles Kelly
- Date of birth: 14 March 1894
- Place of birth: Sandbach, England
- Date of death: 1969 (aged 75)
- Position: Inside forward

Senior career*
Years	Team	Apps	(Gls)
1922	Sandbach Ramblers		
1923–1925	Stoke	27	(5)
1926	Tranmere Rovers	1	(0)
Total		28	(5)
- * Club domestic league appearances and goals

Charles Kelly (14 March 1894 – 1969) was an English footballer who played in the Football League for Stoke and Tranmere Rovers.

== Career ==
Kelly was born in Sandbach and played for local side Sandbach Ramblers before he joined Stoke in 1923. He made his debut for Stoke in the Potteries derby against Port Vale at the Victoria Ground on 6 October 1923. He was used as back up behind regular inside forward Harry Davies, and played nine matches during the 1923–24 season scoring once against Southampton. He was more involved in the next season playing seventeen matches scoring four goals but Stoke had a poor performance in the Second Division and were almost relegated. Kelly was released by Stoke in 1926 and joined Tranmere Rovers.

== Career statistics ==
Appearances and goals by club, season and competition
Club	Season	League			FA Cup		Total	
Club	Season	Division	Apps	Goals	Apps	Goals	Apps	Goals
Stoke	1923–24	Second Division	9	1	0	0	9	1
Stoke	1924–25	Second Division	17	4	1	0	18	4
Stoke	1925–26	Second Division	1	0	0	0	1	0
Stoke	Total		27	5	1	0	28	5
Tranmere Rovers	1926–27	Third Division North	1	0	0	0	1	0
Career total			28	5	1	0	29	5
