= 1924–25 Stoke F.C. season =

Stoke
1924–25 season
- Chairman: Mr A. McSherwin
- Manager: Tom Mather
- Stadium: Victoria Ground
- Football League Second Division: 20th (35 Points)
- FA Cup: First Round
- Top goalscorer: League: Harry Davies (8); All: Harry Davies (8)
- Highest home attendance: 22,747 vs Port Vale (20 September 1924)
- Lowest home attendance: 4,806 vs Bradford City (1 January 1925)
- Average home league attendance: 11,030
Home colours

The 1924–25 season was Stoke's 25th season in the Football League and the sixth in the Second Division.

Following the squad clear-out by manager Tom Mather and with a number of new useful signings Stoke had a decent looking squad on paper going into the 1924–25 season. However the performances out on the pitch were poor and the team was almost relegated staying up by a single point.

== Season review ==
=== League ===
A strong new chairman emerged with the arrival in August 1924 of Mr A. McSherwin who had already spent eleven years on the board and he would go on to hold his position for the next twelve years. After a period of real doubt, confidence started to emerge for the 1924–25 season and was certainly helped by Tom Mather replacing old players with new fresh talent. Under new skipper Vic Rouse, Stoke started the season reasonably well and seemed to have the basis of a useful side with the likes of goalkeeper Bob Dixon, Bob McGrory, Alec Milne, Bert Ralphs, Harry Davies and Len Armitage in the squad.

But overall performances on the pitch were below standard and the team went 12 matches without a win (1 January 1925 to 21 March 1925) and were almost relegated. Four wins and three draws in their last eight matches ensured survival by the narrowest of margins, a single point.

=== FA Cup ===
Stoke exited the cup at the first round going down to a poor 3–0 defeat at Leicester City.

== Final league table ==
Pos	Team	Pld	W	D	L	GF	GA	GAv	Pts	Promotion or relegation
18	Oldham Athletic	42	13	11	18	35	51	0.686	37	
19	Stockport County	42	13	11	18	37	57	0.649	37	
20	Stoke	42	12	11	19	34	46	0.739	35	
21	Crystal Palace	42	12	10	20	38	54	0.704	34	Relegated
22	Coventry City	42	11	9	22	45	84	0.536	31	Relegated

== Results ==
Stoke's score comes first

=== Legend ===
Win	Draw	Loss

=== Football League Second Division ===
Match	Date	Opponent	Venue	Result	Attendance	Scorers
1	30 August 1924	Stockport County	A	0–2	6,000	
2	1 September 1924	Southampton	H	2–0	14,806	Davies (2)
3	6 September 1924	Manchester United	H	0–0	18,105	
4	8 September 1924	Southampton	A	0–3	10,000	
5	13 September 1924	Leicester City	A	1–0	15,000	Armitage
6	20 September 1924	Port Vale	H	0–1	22,747	
7	22 September 1924	Chelsea	H	1–0	8,527	Sellars
8	27 September 1924	Coventry City	H	4–1	11,338	Davies, Watkin, Brough, Eyres
9	4 October 1924	Oldham Athletic	A	0–2	7,000	
10	11 October 1924	The Wednesday	H	0–2	12,388	
11	18 October 1924	Clapton Orient	A	2–0	5,000	Kelly (2)
12	25 October 1924	Middlesbrough	A	0–1	15,000	
13	1 November 1924	Barnsley	H	1–1	5,281	Rouse
14	8 November 1924	Wolverhampton Wanderers	A	0–1	15,000	
15	15 November 1924	Fulham	H	1–1	8,916	Eyres
16	22 November 1924	Portsmouth	A	0–0	10,000	
17	29 November 1924	Hull City	H	2–0	7,136	Jones, Ralphs
18	6 December 1924	Blackpool	A	2–1	10,000	Kelly, Hallham
19	13 December 1924	Derby County	H	1–1	13,317	Watkin
20	20 December 1924	South Shields	A	0–4	10,000	
21	26 December 1924	Bradford City	A	0–1	12,000	
22	27 December 1924	Stockport County	H	3–0	10,993	Hallham, Kelly (pen), Armitage
23	1 January 1925	Bradford City	H	0–0	4,806	
24	3 January 1925	Manchester United	A	0–2	39,907	
25	17 January 1925	Leicester City	H	1–1	11,705	Watkin
26	24 January 1925	Port Vale	A	0–2	17,214	
27	31 January 1925	Coventry City	A	1–3	10,000	Rouse
28	7 February 1925	Oldham Athletic	H	0–1	7,656	
29	14 February 1925	The Wednesday	A	1–2	20,000	Davies
30	21 February 1925	Clapton Orient	H	0–1	10,120	
31	28 February 1925	Middlesbrough	H	0–1	11,807	
32	7 March 1925	Barnsley	A	1–1	8,500	Davies
33	14 March 1925	Wolverhampton Wanderers	H	0–3	20,000	
34	21 March 1925	Fulham	A	0–1	10,000	
35	28 March 1925	Portsmouth	H	2–1	9,920	Clennell, Johnson
36	4 April 1925	Hull City	A	0–0	7,000	
37	10 April 1925	Crystal Palace	A	1–0	10,000	Johnson
38	11 April 1925	Blackpool	H	3–1	15,912	Johnson, Davies, Jones (o.g.)
39	13 April 1925	Crystal Palace	H	1–1	12,000	Johnson
40	18 April 1925	Derby County	A	2–1	10,000	Davies (2)
41	25 April 1925	South Shields	H	0–0	13,875	
42	27 April 1925	Chelsea	A	1–2	10,000	Ralphs

=== FA Cup ===
Round	Date	Opponent	Venue	Result	Attendance	Scorers
R1	10 January 1925	Leicester City	A	0–3	30,000	

== Squad statistics ==
Pos.	Name	League		FA Cup		Total	
Pos.	Name	Apps	Goals	Apps	Goals	Apps	Goals
GK	(Scotland) Kenny Campbell	9	0	0	0	9	0
GK	(England) Bob Dixon	33	0	1	0	34	0
DF	(England) Tommy Howe	19	0	0	0	19	0
DF	(Scotland) Bob McGrory	40	0	1	0	41	0
DF	(England) Alec Milne	18	0	1	0	19	0
MF	(England) Tom Brittleton	8	0	0	0	8	0
MF	(England) Harry Brough	35	1	0	0	35	1
MF	(England) Tommy Dawson	5	0	0	0	5	0
MF	(England) Peter Jackson	10	0	0	0	10	0
MF	(England) Sam Johnson	8	0	0	0	8	0
MF	(England) Alec McClure	24	0	1	0	25	0
MF	(England) Vic Rouse	31	2	1	0	32	2
MF	(England) Frank Searle	0	0	0	0	0	0
MF	(England) George Stentiford	3	0	0	0	3	0
MF	(England) John Walker	9	0	1	0	10	0
FW	(England) Len Armitage	17	2	1	0	18	2
FW	(England) Sid Blackie	2	0	0	0	2	0
FW	(England) Joe Clennell	9	1	0	0	9	1
FW	(England) Harry Davies	26	8	0	0	26	8
FW	(England) John Evans	12	0	0	0	12	0
FW	(England) Jack Eyres	14	2	0	0	14	2
FW	(England) Charles Hallam	19	2	0	0	19	2
FW	(England) Dick Johnson	13	4	0	0	13	4
FW	(England) Alfred Jones	5	1	0	0	5	1
FW	(England) Charles Kelly	17	4	1	0	18	4
FW	(Wales) Dai Nicholas	7	0	0	0	7	0
FW	(Wales) Edgar Powell	2	0	0	0	2	0
FW	(England) Bert Ralphs	42	2	1	0	43	2
FW	(England) Harry Sellars	8	1	1	0	9	1
FW	(England) Arthur Watkin	14	3	1	0	15	3
FW	(England) Bob White	3	0	0	0	3	0
FW	(England) William Wood	0	0	0	0	0	0
–	Own goals	–	1	–	0	–	1
