= Billy Poole =

English footballer

Personal information
- Full name: William Arthur Poole
- Date of birth: 1902
- Place of birth: West Bromwich, England
- Date of death: 1964 (aged 62)
- Height: 5 ft 10 1/2 in (1.79 m)
- Position: Utility player

Senior career*
| Years | Team | Apps | (Gls) |
| 1920–1921 | Kidderminster Harriers | | |
| 1921–1922 | Merthyr Town | 11 | (1) |
| 1922–1923 | Stoke | 12 | (0) |
| 1923–1924 | Watford | 42 | (8) |
| 1925–1926 | Coventry City | 17 | (6) |
| 1926–1927 | Kidderminster Harriers | | |
| 1927–1928 | Yeovil & Petters United | | |
| 1928–1929 | Merthyr Town | 2 | (0) |
| 1929–1930 | Wellington Town | | |
| 1930–1931 | Stourbridge | | |
| 1931–1932 | Walsall | 2 | (0) |
| 1932 | Dudley Town | | |
| Total | | 86 | (15) |
- * Club domestic league appearances and goals

William Arthur Poole (1902–1964) was an English footballer who played in the Football League for Coventry City, Merthyr Town, Walsall, Watford, and Stoke.

== Career ==
Poole was born in West Bromwich and played non-league football with Kidderminster Harriers before joining Merthyr Town in 1921. He played 11 times before the Welsh side before earning a move to Stoke in April 1922. He played in the remaining six matches of the 1921–22 season as Stoke gained promotion to the First Division, but Poole only managed the same number of matches the following season and left for Watford. He spent two seasons with the "Hornets" before spending a short spell at a number of teams which included, Coventry City, Kidderminster Harriers, Yeovil & Petters United, a return to Merthyr Town, Wellington Town, Stourbridge, Walsall and Dudley Town.

== Career statistics ==
| Club | Season | League | | | FA Cup | | Total | |
| Club | Season | Division | Apps | Goals | Apps | Goals | Apps | Goals |
|---|---|---|---|---|---|---|---|---|
| Merthyr Town | 1921–22 | Third Division South | 11 | 1 | 0 | 0 | 11 | 1 |
| Stoke | 1921–22 | Second Division | 6 | 0 | 0 | 0 | 6 | 0 |
| Stoke | 1922–23 | First Division | 6 | 0 | 0 | 0 | 6 | 0 |
| Watford | 1923–24 | Third Division South | 27 | 6 | 1 | 1 | 28 | 7 |
| Watford | 1924–25 | Third Division South | 15 | 2 | 0 | 0 | 15 | 2 |
| Coventry City | 1925–26 | Third Division North | 17 | 6 | 0 | 0 | 17 | 6 |
| Merthyr Town | 1928–29 | Third Division South | 2 | 0 | 0 | 0 | 2 | 0 |
| Walsall | 1931–32 | Third Division North | 2 | 0 | 0 | 0 | 2 | 0 |
| Career total | | | 86 | 15 | 1 | 1 | 87 | 16 |

== Honours ==
Stoke City

- Football League Second Division runner-up: 1921–22
