= Charlie Twemlow =

English footballer (1900–1976)

Personal information
- Full name: Charles Fletcher Twemlow
- Date of birth: 1901
- Place of birth: Macclesfield, England
- Date of death: 1976 (aged 74–75)
- Position: Left-half

Senior career*
Years	Team	Apps	(Gls)
1919–1921	Macclesfield	19	(0)
1921–1922	Stoke	1	(1)
1922–1929	Macclesfield	147	(10)
Total		167	(11)
- * Club domestic league appearances and goals

Charles Fletcher Twemlow (1901–1976) was an English footballer who played in the Football League for Stoke. His brother Billy was also a footballer.

== Career ==
Twemlow was born in Macclesfield and played for Macclesfield before joining Stoke in 1921. He played one match in the Football League which came in a 4–2 victory at Derby County during the 1921–22 season, Twemlow also scored in this match. He was released soon after and re-joined Macclesfield where he played alongside his brother. He spent the next eight years at the Moss Rose making a further 179 appearances for the Silkmen.

== Career statistics ==
Appearances and goals by club, season and competition
Club	Season	League			FA Cup		Other		Total	
Club	Season	Division	Apps	Goals	Apps	Goals	Apps	Goals	Apps	Goals
Macclesfield	1919–20	Cheshire League	14	0	0	0	10	3	24	3
Macclesfield	1919–20	Cheshire League	5	0	0	0	0	0	5	0
Macclesfield	Total		19	0	0	0	10	3	29	3
Stoke	1921–22	Second Division	1	1	0	0	—		1	1
Macclesfield	1922–23	Cheshire League	30	1	2	0	8	1	40	0
Macclesfield	1923–24	Cheshire League	9	0	0	0	0	0	9	0
Macclesfield	1924–25	Cheshire League	23	0	0	0	1	0	24	0
Macclesfield	1925–26	Cheshire League	27	0	0	0	6	0	33	0
Macclesfield	1926–27	Cheshire League	37	4	0	0	5	1	42	5
Macclesfield	1927–28	Cheshire League	12	2	0	0	1	0	13	2
Macclesfield	1928–29	Cheshire League	9	3	6	1	2	0	15	4
Macclesfield	1929–30	Cheshire League	0	0	0	0	1	0	1	0
Macclesfield	Total		147	10	8	1	24	2	179	13
Career total			167	11	8	1	34	5	209	17
