= Vic Rouse (footballer, born 1897) =

English footballer

Val Rouse
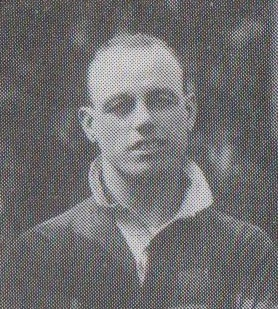
- Rouse in 1928

Personal information
- Full name: Alfred Valentine Rouse
- Date of birth: 14 February 1897
- Place of birth: Hoddesdon, England
- Date of death: 1961 (aged 63–64)
- Height: 5 ft 8 1/2 in (1.74 m)
- Position: Left half

Youth career
- Llanelly
- Pontypridd

Senior career*
Years	Team	Apps	(Gls)
1921–1922	Wolverhampton Wanderers	5	(0)
1922–1926	Stoke	92	(2)
1926	Swansea Town	4	(0)
1926–1929	Port Vale	95	(0)
1929–1931	Crewe Alexandra	83	(1)
- Connah's Quay & Shotton
Total		279	(3)
- * Club domestic league appearances and goals

Alfred Valentine Rouse (14 February 1897 – 1961) was an English footballer who played for Crewe Alexandra, Port Vale, Stoke, Swansea Town and Wolverhampton Wanderers and was described as a 'gentleman' player.

== Career ==
Rouse was born in Hoddesdon and played for Welsh sides Llanelly and Pontypridd before joining Wolverhampton Wanderers in 1921. He played five Second Division games for "Wolves" in the 1921–22 campaign, before joining First Division club Stoke in August 1922. He played in 38 matches in 1922–23 as Stoke suffered relegation back to the Second Division. Manager Tom Mather kept faith with Rouse at left-half in 1923–24, and made him captain for the 1924–25 campaign. He scored his first senior goal in a 1–1 draw with Barnsley at the Victoria Ground on 1 November 1924. Despite possessing a strong squad, overall performances on the pitch were below standard, and the team went 12 matches without a win (1 January 1925 to 21 March 1925) and was almost relegated. Four wins and three draws in their last eight matches ensured survival by the narrowest of margins, a single point. Rouse was sold to Swansea Town but featured just four times for the "Swans" in 1925–26. He left Vetch Field and joined Port Vale in June 1926. He played 29 Second Division matches in the 1926–27 season and then 39 league games in the 1927–28 season, as Vale posted top ten finishes. However, he lost his first-team place at the Old Recreation Ground in February 1929 and was given a free transfer in May 1929. He spent the 1929–30 and 1930–31 seasons in the Third Division North with Crewe Alexandra, before joining Connah's Quay & Shotton.

== Career statistics ==
Appearances and goals by club, season and competition
Club	Season	League			FA Cup		Total	
Club	Season	Division	Apps	Goals	Apps	Goals	Apps	Goals
Wolverhampton Wanderers	1921–22	Second Division	5	0	0	0	5	0
Stoke	1922–23	First Division	37	0	1	0	38	0
Stoke	1923–24	Second Division	24	0	1	0	25	0
Stoke	1924–25	Second Division	31	2	1	0	32	2
Stoke	Total		92	2	3	0	95	2
Swansea Town	1925–26	Second Division	4	0	0	0	4	0
Port Vale	1926–27	Second Division	29	0	3	0	32	0
Port Vale	1927–28	Second Division	38	0	3	0	41	0
Port Vale	1928–29	Second Division	28	0	1	0	29	0
Port Vale	Total		95	0	7	0	102	0
Crewe Alexandra	1929–30	Third Division North	42	0	2	0	44	0
Crewe Alexandra	1930–31	Third Division North	41	1	2	0	43	1
Crewe Alexandra	Total		83	1	4	0	87	1
Career total			279	3	14	0	293	3
