= Sid Blackie =

English footballer and rugby player

Personal information
- Full name: Sydney Blackie
- Date of birth: 24 December 1899
- Place of birth: Gateshead, County Durham, England
- Date of death: 22 May 1966 (aged 66)
- Place of death: Huddersfield, Yorkshire
- Position: Forward

Senior career*
Years	Team	Apps	(Gls)
- Hebden Bridge
1924–1925	Stoke	2	(0)
1926	Southend United	0	(0)
- * Club domestic league appearances and goals

Sydney "Sid" Blackie (24 December 1899 – 22 May 1966) was an English footballer and rugby player who played in the Football League for Stoke and for the Halifax RUFC.

== Football career ==
Blackie was born in Gateshead and played for Hebden Bridge before joining Stoke. He failed to make much of an impact at Stoke making just two appearances in January 1925 and left at the end of the 1924–25 season. He joined Southend United where he again failed to make an impression.

== Rugby career ==
In August 1921, Blackie and Hebden Bridge teammate A. M. Moncrieff began practicing with the Halifax Northern Union Rugby Football Club and promised to play in a trial game, which caused worry for Hebden Bridge officials, as to whether or not they would still be able to play association football. The issue was resolved and in October 1921, Blackie made his first appearance in first-class rugby, playing for the Halifax team. In 1922, he was playing with the Calder Valley Rugby Club.

His talent at rugby was evident. A local newspaper praised him in 1923:

"Sidney Blackie, who formerly played several seasons with the Calder Holme Soccer team has had a successful season in the Rugby code, he having appeared several times with the Halifax senior team and regularly with Halifax Reserves. In general summary of the Halifax Rugby players performances the writer who follows the Halifax teams for a contemporary refers to Blackie thus: Blackie on many occasions has played very cleverly, his chief failing his inclination become lackadaisical. When he overcomes this trait the sooner will his star begin to ascend. He is young, and gaining knowledge as he goes along."

== Personal life ==
Blackie married Alice Whitwam in 1949. He died in May 1966.

== Career statistics ==
Appearances and goals by club, season and competition
Club	Season	League			FA Cup		Total	
Club	Season	Division	Apps	Goals	Apps	Goals	Apps	Goals
Stoke	1924–25	Second Division	2	0	0	0	2	0
Career total			2	0	0	0	2	0
