= Jack Moorwood =

English footballer

Personal information
- Full name: John Edwin Moorwood
- Date of birth: July 1896
- Place of birth: Sheffield, Yorkshire, England
- Date of death: 1 June 1963 (aged 66)
- Place of death: Sheffield, Yorkshire, England
- Height: 5 ft 8 in (1.73 m)
- Position: Defender

Senior career*
Years	Team	Apps	(Gls)
1919–1920	Alfreton United		
1920–1921	Stoke	9	(0)
1921–1923	Wrexham	65	(2)
1924	Bangor City		
1925	Gleadless		
1926	Sheffield Forge		
1927	Woodhouse WMC		
Total		74	(2)
- * Club domestic league appearances and goals

John Edwin Moorwood (July 1896 – 1 June 1963) was an English footballer who played in the Football League for Stoke.

== Career ==
Moorwood was born in Sheffield and began his career with Alfreton United before joining Stoke in 1920. He played nine matches in the Football League for Stoke during the 1920-21 season as the team narrowly avoided relegation. He left at the end of the season and joined the Welsh side Wrexham where he spent two years before leaving for Bangor City. From there they went on to play for a number of pub teams around the Sheffield area including Gleadless, Sheffield Forge and Woodhouse WMC.

== Career statistics ==
Appearances and goals by club, season and competition
Club	Season	League			FA Cup		Total	
Club	Season	Division	Apps	Goals	Apps	Goals	Apps	Goals
Stoke	1920–21	Second Division	9	0	0	0	9	0
Wrexham	1921–22	Third Division North	37	2	4	0	41	2
Wrexham	1922–23	Third Division North	25	0	3	0	28	0
Wrexham	1923–24	Third Division North	3	0	0	0	3	0
Wrexham	Total		65	2	7	0	72	2
Career total			74	2	7	0	81	2
