= Frederick Groves (footballer, born 1892) =

English footballer

Personal information
- Full name: Frederick Groves
- Date of birth: 6 May 1892
- Place of birth: Lincoln, England
- Date of death: 1980 (aged 88)
- Height: 5 ft 7 1/2 in (1.71 m)
- Position: Forward

Senior career*
Years	Team	Apps	(Gls)
1908	South Bar		
1909–1910	Lincoln City	7	(1)
1910	Worksop Town		
1911–1912	Sheffield United	0	(0)
1912–1913	Huddersfield Town	4	(0)
1913	Worksop Town		
1914	Pontypridd		
1921	Tranmere Rovers	12	(7)
1921–1923	Stoke	41	(13)
1924–1925	Crystal Palace	14	(2)
1926	Rhyl Athletic		
1927	Sutton Town		
Total		78	(23)
- * Club domestic league appearances and goals

Frederick Groves (6 May 1892 – 1980) was an English footballer who played in the Football League for Lincoln City, Huddersfield Town, Tranmere Rovers, Crystal Palace and Stoke.

== Career ==
Groves was born in Lincoln and began his career with his local club Lincoln City in 1909. He played seven times for the "Imps", scoring once, and then played for Worksop Town, Sheffield United, Huddersfield Town and Pontypridd before joining Tranmere Rovers in 1921. He scored seven goals in 12 matches for Rovers which promoted Stoke to sign him in November 1921. He scored 12 goals for Stoke in 1921–22 helping them to gain promotion to the First Division. However, Groves struggled in the top flight, scoring just once in 13 matches and was released at the end of the campaign. He then spent two years with Crystal Palace and later played for Rhyl Athletic and Sutton Town.

== Career statistics ==
Appearances and goals by club, season and competition
Club	Season	League			FA Cup		Total	
Club	Season	Division	Apps	Goals	Apps	Goals	Apps	Goals
Lincoln City	1909–10	Second Division	7	1	0	0	7	1
Huddersfield Town	1912–13	Second Division	4	0	0	0	4	0
Tranmere Rovers	1921–22	Third Division North	12	7	0	0	12	7
Stoke	1921–22	Second Division	28	12	5	0	33	12
Stoke	1922–23	First Division	13	1	0	0	13	1
Crystal Palace	1924–25	Second Division	12	2	1	1	13	3
Crystal Palace	1925–26	Third Division South	2	0	0	0	2	0
Career total			78	23	6	1	84	24
