= John Spencer (footballer, born 1898) =

English footballer

Personal information
- Full name: John Thomas Spencer
- Date of birth: 1898
- Place of birth: Stockton-on-Tees, England
- Height: 5 ft 7 1/2 in (1.71 m)
- Position: Outside right

Senior career*
Years	Team	Apps	(Gls)
1914	Grangetown St Mary's		
1918	Eston United		
1919	Crook Town		
1920–1921	Stoke	16	(0)
1921–1922	South Bank		
1922–1923	Hartlepools United	1	(0)
Total		17	(0)
- * Club domestic league appearances and goals

John Thomas Spencer (born 1898) was an English footballer who played in the Football League for Hartlepools United and Stoke.

== Career ==
Spencer was born in Stockton-on-Tees and played amateur football with Grangetown St Mary's, Eston United and Crook Town before being spotted by scouts at Football League club Stoke in 1920. He had a reputation as a promising outside right but failed to impress at Stoke as he played 16 times during the 1920–21 season as the club almost suffered relegation. He returned north at the end of the season to South Bank and played a single match for Hartlepools United in September 1922.

== Career statistics ==
Appearances and goals by club, season and competition
Club	Season	League			FA Cup		Total	
Club	Season	Division	Apps	Goals	Apps	Goals	Apps	Goals
Stoke	1920–21	Second Division	16	0	0	0	16	0
Hartlepools United	1922–23	Third Division North	1	0	0	0	1	0
Career total			17	0	0	0	17	0
