= Kasher (surname) =

Kasher (hebrew: כשר) is a Hebrew surname meaning "fit" and in the common context, fit for consumption by Jews according to traditional Jewish law.

It may refer to:

- Tim Kasher – an American musician
- Aryeh Kasher – an Israeli history emeritus professor
- Asa Kasher – an Israeli philosopher and linguist
- Menachem Mendel Kasher – a Polish-born rabbi
- Moshe Kasher – American comedian and actor
- Joe Kasher – English footballer
