= Frank Searle (footballer) =

English footballer

Personal information
- Full name: Frank Burnett Searle
- Date of birth: 30 January 1906
- Place of birth: Hednesford, England
- Date of death: 16 June 1977 (aged 71)
- Place of death: Waltham Forest, England
- Height: 5 ft 10 in (1.78 m)
- Position: Wing half

Senior career*
Years	Team	Apps	(Gls)
1923–1924	Hednesford Prims		
1924	Stoke	0	(0)
1924–1926	Hednesford Town		
1926	Willenhall		
1926–1928	Bristol City	1	(0)
1928–1933	Charlton Athletic	66	(2)
1933	Chester	4	(0)
1933–1934	Watford	4	(0)
1934–1938	Clapton Orient	122	(1)
1934	→ Ashford (loan)		
Total		197	(3)
- * Club domestic league appearances and goals

Frank Burnett Searle (20 January 1906 – 16 June 1977) was an English footballer who played in the Football League for Stoke, Bristol City, Charlton Athletic, Chester, Watford and Clapton Orient. Whilst signed to the latter club he played for their nursey team Ashford in the Kent League in September 1934.

== Career statistics ==
Appearances and goals by club, season and competition
Club	Season	League			FA Cup		Other		Total	
Club	Season	Division	Apps	Goals	Apps	Goals	Apps	Goals	Apps	Goals
Stoke	1924–25	Second Division	0	0	0	0	0	0	0	0
Bristol City	1927–28	Second Division	1	0	0	0	0	0	1	0
Charlton Athletic	1928–29	Third Division South	3	0	0	0	0	0	3	0
Charlton Athletic	1929–30	Second Division	15	1	2	0	0	0	15	1
Charlton Athletic	1930–31	Second Division	14	0	1	0	0	0	15	0
Charlton Athletic	1931–32	Second Division	23	1	0	0	0	0	23	1
Charlton Athletic	1932–33	Second Division	11	0	1	0	0	0	12	0
Charlton Athletic	Total		66	2	4	0	0	0	70	2
Chester	1933–34	Third Division North	4	0	0	0	0	0	4	0
Watford	1933–34	Third Division South	4	0	1	0	0	0	5	0
Clapton Orient	1934–35	Third Division South	33	0	0	0	0	0	33	0
Clapton Orient	1935–36	Third Division South	38	1	5	0	2 (Note: Appearances in Third Division South Cup)	0	45	1
Clapton Orient	1936–37	Third Division South	26	0	0	0	1	0	27	0
Clapton Orient	1937–38	Third Division South	25	0	3	0	0	0	28	0
Clapton Orient	Total		122	1	8	0	3	0	133	1
Career total			197	3	11	0	3	0	213	3
