= Tommy Little (footballer, born 1890) =

English footballer

Personal information
- Full name: Thomas Stewart Colquhoun Little
- Date of birth: 27 February 1890
- Place of birth: Ilford, England
- Date of death: 1927 (aged 36–37)
- Height: 5 ft 8 1/2 in (1.74 m)
- Position: Forward

Senior career*
Years	Team	Apps	(Gls)
1906–1908	Ilford		
1908	Southend United		
1908–1920	Bradford Park Avenue	231	(106)
1920–1921	Stoke	21	(1)
Total		252	(33)
- * Club domestic league appearances and goals

Thomas Stewart Colquhoun Little (27 February 1890 – 1927) an English professional footballer who played for Bradford Park Avenue and Stoke.

== Career ==
Little began his career with his hometown club Ilford and Southend United before joining Football League Second Division side Bradford Park Avenue in 1908. He was a decent forward as a teenager and he helped Bradford gain promotion in 1913–14 scoring 24 goals in 39 games. His career was interrupted by World War I but he returned to Bradford once the League was restored in 1919–20. With Bradford heading for relegation he joined Stoke in 1920–21 where he played 21 times for the "Potters" scoring once against Clapton Orient.

== Career statistics ==
Appearances and goals by club, season and competition
Club	Season	League			FA Cup		Total	
Club	Season	Division	Apps	Goals	Apps	Goals	Apps	Goals
Bradford Park Avenue	1908–09	Second Division	13	5	0	0	13	5
Bradford Park Avenue	1909–10	Second Division	20	9	0	0	20	9
Bradford Park Avenue	1910–11	Second Division	37	19	2	2	39	21
Bradford Park Avenue	1911–12	Second Division	17	6	0	0	17	6
Bradford Park Avenue	1912–13	Second Division	31	17	5	1	36	18
Bradford Park Avenue	1913–14	Second Division	37	24	2	0	39	24
Bradford Park Avenue	1914–15	First Division	33	15	3	0	36	15
Bradford Park Avenue	1919–20	First Division	32	11	4	2	36	13
Bradford Park Avenue	1920–21	First Division	11	0	0	0	11	0
Bradford Park Avenue	Total		231	106	16	5	247	37
Stoke	1920–21	Second Division	17	1	0	0	17	1
Stoke	1921–22	Second Division	4	0	0	0	4	0
Stoke	Total		21	1	0	0	21	1
Career total			252	107	16	5	268	38

== Honours ==
Bradford Park Avenue

- Football League Second Division runner-up: 1913–14

Stoke

- Football League Second Division runner-up: 1921–22
