= Matthew Burton (English footballer) =

English footballer

Personal information
- Full name: Matthew Burton
- Date of birth: 8 February 1897
- Place of birth: Grassmoor, England
- Date of death: 1940 (aged 43)
- Place of death: England
- Height: 5 ft 9 1/2 in (1.77 m)
- Position: Forward

Senior career*
Years	Team	Apps	(Gls)
1914	Grassmoor Athletic		
1919	Everton	0	(0)
1919–1920	Stoke	8	(1)
1921–1922	Wrexham	54	(10)
1923–1924	New Brighton	16	(6)
1925	Oswestry Town		
1925	Rhos Athletic		
1926	Llandudno		
1927	Rhos Athletic		
1927	Connah's Quay & Shotton		
Total		78	(17)
- * Club domestic league appearances and goals

Matthew Burton (8 February 1897 – 1940) was an English footballer who played in the Football League for Everton, New Brighton, Wrexham and Stoke.

== Career ==
Burton was born in Grassmoor and played non-league football for local side Grassmoor Athletic before joining Everton just after World War I. However, he didn't stay long and joined Stoke where he spent the 1919–20 and 1920–21 season scoring once in eight league matches. He was released at the end and joined Wrexham where he scored 10 goals and went on to score six for New Brighton. After ending his professional career with New Brighton Burton played for Welsh clubs Oswestry Town, Rhos Athletic, Llandudno and Connah's Quay & Shotton.

== Career statistics ==
Appearances and goals by club, season and competition
Club	Season	League			FA Cup		Total	
Club	Season	Division	Apps	Goals	Apps	Goals	Apps	Goals
Stoke	1919–20	Second Division	3	0	0	0	3	0
Stoke	1920–21	Second Division	5	1	1	1	6	2
Wrexham	1921–22	Third Division North	32	9	4	3	36	12
Wrexham	1922–23	Third Division North	22	1	3	0	25	1
New Brighton	1923–24	Third Division North	15	5	0	0	15	5
New Brighton	1924–25	Third Division North	1	1	0	0	1	1
Career total			78	17	8	4	86	21
