= John Evans (footballer, born 1900) =

English footballer

Personal information
- Full name: John Evans
- Date of birth: 12 February 1900
- Place of birth: Barking, England
- Position: Forward

Senior career*
Years	Team	Apps	(Gls)
1919–1920	West Bromwich Standard		
1920–1921	Ewells		
1921–1922	Walsall	1	(0)
1922–1923	Shrewsbury Town		
1923–1924	Sheffield United	2	(0)
1924–1925	Stoke	12	(0)
1925	Northwich Victoria		
1926	Shrewsbury Town		
1927	Stalybridge Connaughts		
Total		15	(0)
- * Club domestic league appearances and goals

John Evans (born 12 February 1900) was an English footballer who played in the Football League for Sheffield United, Walsall and Stoke.

== Career ==
Evans was born in Barking and played for West Bromwich Standard and Ewells before joining Walsall in 1921. He played once for the "Saddlers" and then played for Shrewsbury Town and two matches with Sheffield United before signing for Stoke in 1924. He played 12 times for Stoke in 1924–25 failing to make much of an impact and was released from the Victoria Ground at the end of the season. He then went on to play for Northwich Victoria, Shrewsbury Town and Stalybridge Connaughts .

== Career statistics ==
Appearances and goals by club, season and competition
Club	Season	League			FA Cup		Total	
Club	Season	Division	Apps	Goals	Apps	Goals	Apps	Goals
Walsall	1921–22	Third Division North	1	0	0	0	1	0
Sheffield United	1923–24	First Division	2	0	0	0	2	0
Stoke	1924–25	Second Division	12	0	0	0	12	0
Career Total			15	0	0	0	15	0
