= Septimus Rutherford =

English footballer

Sep Rutherford
Personal information
- Full name: Septimus Eric Rutherford
- Date of birth: 29 November 1907
- Place of birth: Percy Main, England
- Date of death: 1975 (aged 67–68)
- Height: 5 ft 10 in (1.78 m)
- Position: Winger

Senior career*
Years	Team	Apps	(Gls)
1927–1936	Portsmouth	121	(33)
1936–1937	Blackburn Rovers	13	(1)
- * Club domestic league appearances and goals

Septimus Eric "Sep" Rutherford (29 November 1907 – 1975) was an English footballer.

== Career ==
Rutherford played in the Football League for Blackburn Rovers and Portsmouth. His brothers Bob and Jock were also professional footballers as well as his nephew John.

== Honours ==
Portsmouth

- FA Cup runner-up: 1933–34
