= Jimmy McColl (footballer, born 1892) =

Scottish footballer (1892–1978)

Personal information
- Full name: James McColl
- Date of birth: 14 December 1892
- Place of birth: Glasgow, Scotland
- Date of death: 1978 (aged 85–86)
- Place of death: Edinburgh, Scotland
- Position: Forward

Youth career
- Anderson Thornbank

Senior career*
Years	Team	Apps	(Gls)
- St Anthony's
1913–1920	Celtic	165	(120)
1913	→ Peebles Rovers (loan)		
1920–1921	Stoke	27	(5)
1921–1922	Partick Thistle	35	(10)
1922–1931	Hibernian	290	(130)
1931–1932	Leith Athletic	14	(3)
Total		531	(268)

Managerial career
- 1931–1932: Leith Athletic
- * Club domestic league appearances and goals

James McColl (14 December 1892 – 1978) was a Scottish footballer who played as a forward for Celtic, Hibernian and Stoke. McColl scored over 250 goals in the Scottish Football League, and was top scorer in the 1915–16 season with Celtic.

== Career ==
McColl was born in Glasgow and played for Anderson Thornbank and St Anthony's before joining Celtic in 1913. He became a prolific scorer in the Scottish First Division helping the Bhoys team to win the title five times in his seven seasons at Celtic Park as well as a Scottish Cup in 1913–14.

He moved to Stoke in 1920–21 to try his luck in the English game but he struggled, scoring five goals in 27 matches, and at the end of the season returned to Scotland with Partick Thistle then Hibernian. He continued his goalscoring in the Scottish League and hit 143 goals in 320 matches for the Hibees, playing alongside another former St Anthony's forward Jimmy Dunn for several seasons. Despite his prolonged success and goalscoring prowess at club level, he was never chosen for the Scotland national team or any other representative select teams.

== Career statistics ==
Appearances and goals by club, season and competition
Club	Season	League			Cup		Total	
Club	Season	Division	Apps	Goals	Apps	Goals	Apps	Goals
Celtic	1913–14	Scottish Division One	17	7	4	6	21	13
Celtic	1914–15	Scottish Division One	33	26	–		33	26
Celtic	1915–16	Scottish Division One	32	36	–		32	36
Celtic	1916–17	Scottish Division One	31	24	–		31	24
Celtic	1917–18	Scottish Division One	14	10	–		14	10
Celtic	1918–19	Scottish Division One	30	17	–		30	17
Celtic	1919–20	Scottish Division One	8	0	0	0	8	0
Celtic	Total		165	120	4	6	169	126
Stoke	1920–21	Second Division	27	5	0	0	27	5
Hibernian	1922–23	Scottish Division One	26	12	7	4	33	16
Hibernian	1923–24	Scottish Division One	33	21	6	1	39	22
Hibernian	1924–25	Scottish Division One	38	21	1	0	39	21
Hibernian	1925–26	Scottish Division One	31	10	3	1	34	11
Hibernian	1926–27	Scottish Division One	31	16	1	0	32	16
Hibernian	1927–28	Scottish Division One	38	26	5	1	43	27
Hibernian	1928–29	Scottish Division One	33	11	1	0	34	11
Hibernian	1929–30	Scottish Division One	31	9	3	2	34	11
Hibernian	1930–31	Scottish Division One	29	4	3	4	33	8
Hibernian	Total		290	130	30	13	320	143
Career total			482	255	34	19	516	274

== Honours ==
Celtic

- Scottish Football League: 1913–14, 1914–15, 1915–16, 1916–17, 1918–19
- Scottish Cup: 1913–14
- Glasgow Cup: 1915–16
- Glasgow Merchants Charity Cup: 1913–14, 1914–15, 1916–17

Hibernian

- Scottish Cup runner-up: 1922–23, 1923–24

== See also ==
- List of footballers in Scotland by number of league appearances (500+)
- List of footballers in Scotland by number of league goals (200+)
