= Bob White (footballer) =

English footballer

Personal information
- Full name: Robert Nelson White
- Date of birth: 11 August 1902
- Place of birth: Walbottle, England
- Date of death: 1977 (aged 75)
- Position: Forward

Senior career*
Years	Team	Apps	(Gls)
- Prudhoe Celtic
1923	Huddersfield Town	0	(0)
1924–1925	Stoke	3	(0)
1925–1926	Tranmere Rovers	45	(16)
1926–1929	Yeovil & Petters United		
1929–1930	Wolverhampton Wanderers	3	(2)
1930–1931	Watford	20	(16)
1931–1932	Portsmouth	0	(0)
1932–1933	Carlisle United	22	(7)
Total		93	(42)
- * Club domestic league appearances and goals

Robert Nelson White (11 August 1902 – 1977) was an English footballer who played in the Football League for Carlisle United, Tranmere Rovers, Watford, Wolverhampton Wanderers and Stoke.

== Career ==
White was born in Walbottle and began his career with amateur side Prudhoe Celtic before joining Huddersfield Town in 1923. He failed to make an appearance for Huddersfield and left for Stoke in 1924. He spent the 1924–25 at Stoke making just three appearances for the club in February 1925. With White's career looking as if it would fade away he converted to an out and out striker and signed for Tranmere Rovers and scored 13 goals in 1925–26. A poor 1926–27 saw him leave for non-league Yeovil & Petters United where he spent four years before returning to Football League action with Wolverhampton Wanderers. He played three matches for Wolves and scored twice in a Black Country derby match against West Bromwich Albion, although the match ended in a 7–3 victory for the "Baggies". White then joined Watford where he enjoyed the best spell of his career scoring an impressive 21 goals in 24 matches in two seasons. He then joined Portsmouth where he failed to settle and ended his career at Carlisle United.

== Career statistics ==
Club	Season	League			FA Cup		Total	
Club	Season	Division	Apps	Goals	Apps	Goals	Apps	Goals
Stoke	1924–25	Second Division	3	0	0	0	3	0
Tranmere Rovers	1925–26	Third Division North	26	13	2	0	28	13
Tranmere Rovers	1926–27	Third Division North	19	3	0	0	19	3
Wolverhampton Wanderers	1929–30	Second Division	3	2	0	0	3	2
Watford	1930–31	Third Division South	11	10	0	0	11	10
Watford	1931–32	Third Division South	9	7	4	4	13	11
Carlisle United	1932–33	Third Division North	22	7	3	1	25	8
Career Total			93	42	9	5	102	47
