= Alfred Jordan (footballer) =

Irish footballer

Personal information
- Full name: Alfred Ralph Jordan
- Date of birth: 1900
- Place of birth: Belfast, Ireland
- Date of death: 1969 (aged 69)
- Position: Full-back

Senior career*
Years	Team	Apps	(Gls)
1922	Willowfield		
1923–1924	Stoke	2	(0)
1924–1925	Hull City	9	(0)
1926	Bristol Rovers	0	(0)
1927	Dundalk		
- * Club domestic league appearances and goals

Alfred Ralph Jordan (1900–1969) was an Irish footballer who played in the Football League for Stoke.

== Career ==
Jordan was born in Belfast and played for local side Willowfield where he was a decent defender. This attracted to attention of English club Stoke who signed Jordan in 1923. However, he failed to make it at the Victoria Ground and managed just two appearances in 1923–24 before joining Hull City. He never made it in the English game and after a short spell with Bristol Rovers he returned to Ireland with Dundalk.

== Career statistics ==
Club	Season	League			FA Cup		Total	
Club	Season	Division	Apps	Goals	Apps	Goals	Apps	Goals
Stoke	1923–24	Second Division	2	0	0	0	2	0
Hull City	1924–25	Second Division	9	0	0	0	9	0
Career Total			11	0	0	0	11	0
