= Syd Mellor =

English footballer

Personal information
- Full name: Sydney Mellor
- Date of birth: 13 September 1893
- Place of birth: Leek, England
- Date of death: 1965 (aged 71–72)
- Height: 5 ft 7 1/2 in (1.71 m)
- Position: Inside left

Senior career*
Years	Team	Apps	(Gls)
1919	Leek Town		
1920–1922	Stoke	11	(1)
1922–1925	Macclesfield	124	(46)
1925	Congleton Town		
- * Club domestic league appearances and goals

Sydney Mellor (1893 – 1965) was an English footballer who played in the Football League for Stoke.

== Career ==
Mellor was born in Leek and played for the local club Leek Town before joining Stoke in 1920. He played 11 times for Stoke scoring once which came in a 4–2 win away at Derby County on 25 February 1922.

== Career statistics ==
Appearances and goals by club, season and competition
Club	Season	League			FA Cup		Other		Total	
Club	Season	Division	Apps	Goals	Apps	Goals	Apps	Goals	Apps	Goals
Stoke	1920–21	Second Division	3	0	0	0	—		3	0
Stoke	1921–22	Second Division	8	1	0	0	—		8	1
Stoke	Total		11	1	0	0	—		11	1
Macclesfield	1922–23	Cheshire League	36	13	1	0	10	4	46	17
Macclesfield	1923–24	Cheshire League	37	17	2	1	3	0	42	18
Macclesfield	1924–25	Cheshire League	41	15	0	0	2	1	43	16
Macclesfield	1925–26	Cheshire League	10	1	0	0	0	0	10	1
Macclesfield	Total		124	46	3	1	15	5	141	52
Career total			135	47	3	1	15	5	152	53
