= Albert Moore (footballer, born 1898) =

English footballer

Personal information
- Full name: Albert Edward Moore
- Date of birth: 1898
- Place of birth: Longton, England
- Position: Inside forward

Senior career*
Years	Team	Apps	(Gls)
1920	Normacot		
1921–1922	Stoke	1	(0)
1922	Burslem Swifts		
- * Club domestic league appearances and goals

Albert Edward Moore (born 1898) was an English footballer who played in the Football League for Stoke.

== Career ==
Moore was born in Longton and played amateur football with Normacot before joining Stoke in 1921. He played one match in the Football League which came in a 1–0 defeat to Bradford Park Avenue during the 1921–22 season. He then returned to amateur status and played for Burslem Swifts.

== Career statistics ==
Club	Season	League			FA Cup		Total	
Club	Season	Division	Apps	Goals	Apps	Goals	Apps	Goals
Stoke	1921–22	Second Division	1	0	0	0	1	0
Career Total			1	0	0	0	1	0
