= Victor Shore =

English footballer

Personal information
- Full name: Victor Shore
- Date of birth: 11 February 1897
- Place of birth: Wednesbury, England
- Date of death: 1981 (aged 84)
- Position: Forward

Senior career*
Years	Team	Apps	(Gls)
1919	Deans Works		
1919–1920	Sunderland	5	(1)
1921–1922	Stoke	3	(0)
1923	Brierley Hill Alliance		
1924	Cottage Spring		
1925	Whitburn		
- * Club domestic league appearances and goals

Victor Shore (11 February 1897 – 1981) was an English footballer who played in the Football League for Sunderland and Stoke.

== Career ==
Shore was born in Wednesbury and played for Deans Works before joining Sunderland in 1919. However, despite scoring on his debut against Preston North End in April 1920 he was unable to break into the first team and left for Stoke in 1921. He again failed to make an impact play just three matches in 1921–22 and was released from the Victoria Ground at the end of the season. He went on to play for Brierley Hill Alliance, Cottage Spring and Whitburn.

== Career statistics ==
Club	Season	League			FA Cup		Total	
Club	Season	Division	Apps	Goals	Apps	Goals	Apps	Goals
Sunderland	1919–20	First Division	1	1	0	0	1	1
Sunderland	1920–21	First Division	4	0	0	0	4	0
Stoke	1921–22	Second Division	3	0	0	0	3	0
Career Total			8	1	0	0	8	1
