= Charles Hallam =

English footballer

Personal information
- Full name: Charles Hallam
- Date of birth: 17 January 1902
- Place of birth: Longton, Staffordshire, England
- Date of death: 20 March 1970 (aged 68)
- Place of death: Fenton, Stoke-on-Trent, England
- Position: Forward

Youth career
- Sandford Hill Primitives

Senior career*
Years	Team	Apps	(Gls)
1922–1923	Port Vale	1	(0)
1923–1924	Sandbach Ramblers		
1924–1926	Stoke	31	(2)
1927	Crystal Palace	2	(2)
- Stafford Rangers
- Hednesford Town
Total		34	(4)
- * Club domestic league appearances and goals

Charles Hallam (17 January 1902 – 20 March 1970) was an English footballer who played in the Football League for Crystal Palace, Port Vale and Stoke.

== Career ==
Hallam played for Sandford Hill Primitives before joining Port Vale in September 1922. His only appearance was at inside-left in a goalless draw with Rotherham County at the Old Recreation Ground on 25 November 1922. He was released in August 1923 and moved on to Sandbach Ramblers. Hallam then joined Stoke in September 1924 and played 19 Second Division games in 1924–25, scoring twice against Blackpool and Stockport County. He played six times in each of the next two seasons and helped Stoke to win the Third Division North title in 1926–27. He then moved on to Crystal Palace in June 1927. He scored in both of his two appearances for the club and later played for non-League sides Stafford Rangers and Hednesford Town.

== Career statistics ==
Appearances and goals by club, season and competition
Club	Season	League			FA Cup		Other		Total	
Club	Season	Division	Apps	Goals	Apps	Goals	Apps	Goals	Apps	Goals
Port Vale	1922–23	Second Division	1	0	1	0	0	0	2	0
Stoke	1924–25	Second Division	19	2	0	0	0	0	19	2
Stoke	1925–26	Second Division	6	0	0	0	0	0	6	0
Stoke	1926–27	Third Division North	6	0	2	0	0	0	8	0
Stoke	Total		31	2	2	0	0	0	33	2
Crystal Palace	1927–28	Third Division South	2	2	0	0	0	0	2	2
Career total			34	4	3	0	0	0	37	4

== Honours ==
Stoke City

- Football League Third Division North: 1926–27
