= 1921–22 Stoke F.C. season =

Stoke
1921–22 season
- Chairman: Mr E.Reynish
- Manager: Arthur Shallcross
- Stadium: Victoria Ground
- Football League Second Division: 2nd (52 Points)
- FA Cup: Third Round
- Top goalscorer: League: Jimmy Broad (25); All: Jimmy Broad (27)
- Highest home attendance: 27,015 vs Port Vale (24 September 1921)
- Lowest home attendance: 5,000 vs Bury (21 January 1922)
- Average home league attendance: 15,200
Home colours

The 1921–22 season was Stoke's 22nd season in the Football League and the fourth in the Second Division.

After almost being relegated to the third tier last season Stoke improved dramatically and finished in 2nd position gaining promotion to the First Division. Key to Stoke's success was the early season signing of the Broad brothers Tommy and Jimmy with the later scoring 27 goals.

== Season review ==
=== League ===
After the disappointments of last season, there was another conscious effort to strengthen the squad for the 1921–22 season, and a wealthy director John Slater proved to be the most ambitious as he spent a lot of his own money to bring to the club the Broad brothers, Tommy and Jimmy. Jimmy was an out-and-out centre forward who came in after having scored 37 goals in 48 matches for Millwall. Tommy on the other hand was a pacey right winger who signed from Manchester City. The idea of developing young talent was also coming to the fore, with the appointment of Tom Brittleton as player-coach, which was met with approval from the club's supporters.

The season turned out to be one of the best the club had experienced up to that time and promotion was gained to the top-flight, Stoke finishing runners-up to Nottingham Forest. Eleven home draws probably cost Stoke top spot but nevertheless their form throughout the season was very good and the team was well supported by the fans with an average attendance of 15,000. Jimmy Broad was top scorer with 25 league goals and he also became the first Stoke player to score four goals in a Football League match, achieving this feat in a 5–1 home win over Crystal Palace in early December. Stoke also achieved an unbeaten league run of 15 matches from 27 December to 8 April.

=== FA Cup ===
The Cup also provided Stoke with some success as they beat local rivals Port Vale 4–2 in an epic cup tie in Burslem. Arthur Watkin scored a hat-trick in front of 14,471 tie at The Old Recreation Ground. Stoke then saw off Northampton Town 3–0 in a replay before 43,689 fans turned out to see Stoke take on Aston Villa in the third round. The match ended goalless and in the replay Villa ran away with it and scored four without reply.

== Final league table ==
Pos	Team	Pld	W	D	L	GF	GA	GAv	Pts	Promotion or relegation
1	Nottingham Forest (C, P)	42	22	12	8	51	30	1.700	56	Promotion to the First Division
2	Stoke (P)	42	18	16	8	60	44	1.364	52	Promotion to the First Division
3	Barnsley	42	22	8	12	67	52	1.288	52	
4	West Ham United	42	20	8	14	52	39	1.333	48	
5	Hull City	42	19	10	13	51	41	1.244	48	

(C) Champions; (P) Promoted

== Results ==
Stoke's score comes first

=== Legend ===
Win	Draw	Loss

=== Football League Second Division ===
Match	Date	Opponent	Venue	Result	Attendance	Scorers
1	27 August 1921	West Ham United	H	2–0	15,000	Watkin, J Broad
2	29 August 1921	South Shields	A	1–1	4,000	J Broad
3	3 September 1921	West Ham United	A	0–3	20,000	
4	5 September 1921	South Shields	H	2–1	8,500	J Broad (2)
5	10 September 1921	Clapton Orient	H	0–0	15,000	
6	17 September 1921	Clapton Orient	A	0–1	10,000	
7	24 September 1921	Port Vale	H	0–0	27,015	
8	1 October 1921	Port Vale	A	1–0	24,996	J Broad
9	8 October 1921	Bradford Park Avenue	H	0–1	12,000	
10	15 October 1921	Bradford Park Avenue	A	4–2	10,000	J Broad (2), Watkin, T Broad
11	22 October 1921	Leeds United	A	2–1	10,000	J Broad, Tempest
12	29 October 1921	Leeds United	H	3–0	15,000	J Broad, T Broad, Whitehurst
13	5 November 1921	Hull City	H	0–0	10,000	
14	12 November 1921	Hull City	A	1–7	9,000	Watkin
15	19 November 1921	Notts County	H	0–0	6,000	
16	26 November 1921	Notts County	A	0–0	10,000	
17	3 December 1921	Crystal Palace	H	5–1	9,000	J Broad (4), Groves
18	10 December 1921	Crystal Palace	A	2–0	12,000	J Broad (2)
19	17 December 1921	Rotherham County	A	0–0	6,000	
20	24 December 1921	Rotherham County	H	1–1	6,000	J Broad
21	26 December 1921	Fulham	A	1–2	17,000	Clarke
22	27 December 1921	Fulham	H	3–0	20,000	Tempest, Watkin, Groves
23	31 December 1921	The Wednesday	H	1–1	12,000	Groves
24	14 January 1922	The Wednesday	A	1–0	10,000	Groves
25	21 January 1922	Bury	H	1–0	5,000	T Broad
26	4 February 1922	Leicester City	H	1–1	9,000	T Broad
27	8 February 1922	Bury	A	1–0	7,000	Watkin
28	11 February 1922	Leicester City	A	4–3	21,000	Groves (2), J Broad, Tempest
29	25 February 1922	Derby County	A	4–2	8,000	Groves, J Broad, Twemlow, Mellor
30	4 March 1922	Coventry City	H	2–2	16,000	Groves, J Broad
31	6 March 1922	Derby County	H	1–1	11,000	J Broad
32	11 March 1922	Coventry City	A	1–0	25,000	Groves
33	18 March 1922	Barnsley	A	2–2	10,000	J Broad, Watkin
34	25 March 1922	Barnsley	H	1–0	14,000	Tempest
35	1 April 1922	Wolverhampton Wanderers	A	1–1	20,000	Tempest
36	8 April 1922	Wolverhampton Wanderers	H	3–0	10,000	Tempest, J Broad (2)
37	14 April 1922	Blackpool	A	2–3	17,000	J Broad, Groves
38	15 April 1922	Nottingham Forest	H	1–1	20,000	J Broad
39	17 April 1922	Blackpool	H	1–1	20,000	Tempest
40	22 April 1922	Nottingham Forest	A	1–3	12,000	Whitehurst
41	29 April 1922	Bristol City	A	0–2	15,000	
42	6 May 1922	Bristol City	H	3–0	16,000	Groves, Watkin (2)

=== FA Cup ===
Round	Date	Opponent	Venue	Result	Attendance	Scorers
R1	7 January 1922	Port Vale	A	4–2	14,471	Watkin (3), Tempest
R2	28 January 1922	Northampton Town	A	2–2	16,000	Watkin (2)
R2 Replay	2 February 1922	Northampton Town	H	3–0	30,000	Tempest, J Broad (2)
R3	18 February 1922	Aston Villa	H	0–0	43,689	
R3 Replay	22 February 1922	Aston Villa	A	0–4	26,540	

== Squad statistics ==
Pos.	Name	League		FA Cup		Total	
Pos.	Name	Apps	Goals	Apps	Goals	Apps	Goals
GK	(England) Tom Kay	6	0	0	0	6	0
GK	(England) Percy Knott	15	0	2	0	17	0
GK	(England) Jimmy Lee	21	0	3	0	24	0
DF	(England) Tommy Howe	1	0	0	0	1	0
DF	(Scotland) Bob McGrory	41	0	5	0	46	0
DF	(England) Alec Milne	41	0	5	0	46	0
MF	(England) Ewart Beswick	17	0	4	0	21	0
MF	(England) Tom Brittleton	14	0	5	0	19	0
MF	(England) George Clarke	42	1	5	0	47	1
MF	(Scotland) Bill Dickie	12	0	0	0	12	0
MF	(England) Billy Poole	6	0	0	0	6	0
MF	(England) Dickie Smith	35	0	2	0	37	0
MF	(England) Fred Wilkinson	3	0	0	0	3	0
FW	(England) Jimmy Broad	41	25	5	2	46	27
FW	(England) Tommy Broad	32	3	4	0	36	3
FW	(England) Fred Groves	28	12	5	0	33	12
FW	(England) Tommy Little	4	0	0	0	4	0
FW	(England) Syd Mellor	8	1	0	0	8	1
FW	(England) Albert Moore	1	0	0	0	1	0
FW	(Wales) Dai Nicholas	6	0	0	0	6	0
FW	(England) Louis Page	1	0	0	0	1	0
FW	(England) Victor Shore	3	0	0	0	3	0
FW	(England) Sam Spencer	1	0	0	0	1	0
FW	(England) Billy Tempest	41	7	5	2	46	9
FW	(England) Charlie Twemlow	1	1	0	0	1	1
FW	(England) Arthur Watkin	35	8	5	5	40	13
FW	(England) Albert Whitehurst	6	2	0	0	6	2
