= Frank Richardson (footballer, born 1897) =

English footballer

Personal information
- Full name: Frank Richardson
- Date of birth: 29 January 1897
- Place of birth: Barking, England
- Date of death: 19 May 1987 (aged 90)
- Height: 5 ft 9 in (1.75 m)
- Position: Forward

Senior career*
Years	Team	Apps	(Gls)
1920–1921	Barking Town		
1921–1922	Plymouth Argyle	63	(37)
1922–1923	Stoke	14	(3)
1923–1924	West Ham United	10	(2)
1924–1926	Swindon Town	53	(33)
1926–1929	Reading	91	(44)
1930–1931	Swindon Town	38	(11)
1931	Mansfield Town	0	(0)
Total		269	(130)
- * Club domestic league appearances and goals

Frank Richardson (29 January 1897 – 19 May 1987 ) was an English footballer who played in the Football League for Reading, Plymouth Argyle, Swindon Town, West Ham United and Stoke.

== Career ==
Richardson was born in Barking and played for the local club Barking Town before joining Plymouth Argyle in 1921. In his first season as a professional he scored 31 goals in 41 matches as Plymouth finished in 2nd place in the Third Division South which included a hat-trick on his debut. He signed for First Division Stoke in March 1923 but only scored once as Stoke were relegated at the end of the 1922–23 season. He scored just twice in 1923–24 and was sold to West Ham United where he gain struggled in the top flight and he decided to return to the Third Division South joining Swindon Town.

He soon rekindled his goalscoring ability scoring 15 in 35 appearances in 1924–25 and then an impressive 18 in 19 in 1925–26 which also included 10 in 4 FA Cup matches.

Midway through the season he joined Reading scoring 12 goals in the last 13 matches which saw the "Biscuitmen" win the Third Division South title. In 1926–27 he again had a good season in the cup scoring nine goals in ten, including the only goal in front of Reading's record crowd of 33,042 against Brentford. Reading reached the semi-final that year, losing out to Cardiff City. He left Elm Park in the summer of 1930 having scored 55 goals in 103 matches.

Frank then spent 1930–31 at Swindon scoring 11 goals in 39 matches and had a short spell at Mansfield Town before deciding to retire.

When Reading secured promotion in 1976, 50 years after Frank achieved the same feat in 1926, he was invited to celebrate with the team. A decade later, Reading won Division Three once more, and Frank was invited back as the sole surviving member of that team.

== Career statistics ==
Appearances and goals by club, season and competition
Club	Season	League			FA Cup		Total	
Club	Season	Division	Apps	Goals	Apps	Goals	Apps	Goals
Plymouth Argyle	1921–22	Third Division South	41	31	2	0	43	31
Plymouth Argyle	1922–23	Third Division South	22	6	2	4	24	10
Plymouth Argyle	Total		63	37	4	4	67	41
Stoke	1922–23	First Division	8	1	0	0	8	1
Stoke	1923–24	Second Division	6	2	0	0	6	2
Stoke	Total		14	3	0	0	14	3
West Ham United	1923–24	First Division	10	2	1	0	11	2
Swindon Town	1924–25	Third Division South	34	15	1	0	35	15
Swindon Town	1925–26	Third Division South	19	18	4	10	23	28
Swindon Town	Total		53	33	5	10	58	43
Reading	1925–26	Third Division South	13	12	0	0	13	12
Reading	1926–27	Second Division	36	18	10	9	46	27
Reading	1927–28	Second Division	31	11	2	2	33	13
Reading	1928–29	Second Division	10	3	0	0	10	3
Reading	1929–30	Second Division	1	0	0	0	1	0
Reading	Total		91	44	12	11	103	55
Swindon Town	1930–31	Third Division South	38	11	1	0	39	11
Career total			269	130	23	25	292	155

== Honours ==
Reading

- Football League Third Division South champions: 1925–26
