= John Rutherford (footballer) =

English footballer

Personal information
- Full name: John James Rutherford
- Date of birth: 4 March 1907
- Place of birth: South Shields, England
- Date of death: 1983 (aged 75–76)
- Position: Winger

Senior career*
Years	Team	Apps	(Gls)
- Ilford
1926–1927	West Ham United	0	(0)
1924-1927	Arsenal	1	(0)
	Tunbridge Wells	1	(0)
- * Club domestic league appearances and goals

John James Rutherford (4 March 1907 – 1983) was an English footballer.

== Career ==
Rutherford began his career at amateur club Ilford, scoring a hat-trick as a teenager in a 3–1 away win against Ajax, before having brief spells at West Ham United and Arsenal. Rutherford later played for Tunbridge Wells Rangers.

== Personal life ==
His father Jock was also a professional footballer as well as his uncles Sep and Bob. Rutherford's grandson, Greg Rutherford, is an Olympic long jump gold medallist.
