= Wilf Edwards =

English footballer

Personal information
- Full name: Wilfred James Edwards
- Date of birth: 12 August 1905
- Place of birth: Fenton, England
- Date of death: 1976 (aged 70–71)
- Height: 5 ft 8 in (1.73 m)
- Position: Outside left

Senior career*
Years	Team	Apps	(Gls)
1923–1924	Stoke	0	(0)
1924–1925	Crewe Alexandra	10	(1)
1926–1928	Stafford Rangers		
1928–1929	Crewe Alexandra	2	(1)
1929–1930	Burton Town		
1930–1931	Loughborough Corinthians		
1931	Lincoln City	1	(0)
Total		13	(2)
- * Club domestic league appearances and goals

Wilfred James Edwards (12 August 1905 – 1976) was a footballer who played in the Football League for Crewe Alexandra and Lincoln City. He was born in Fenton, England.

== Career statistics ==
Appearances and goals by club, season and competition
Club	Season	League			FA Cup		Total	
Club	Season	Division	Apps	Goals	Apps	Goals	Apps	Goals
Stoke	1923–24	Second Division	0	0	0	0	0	0
Crewe Alexandra	1924–25	Third Division North	10	1	0	0	10	1
Crewe Alexandra	1928–29	Third Division North	2	1	0	0	2	1
Crewe Alexandra	Total		12	2	0	0	12	1
Lincoln City	1931–32	Third Division North	1	0	0	0	1	0
Career total			13	2	0	0	13	2
