= 1920–21 Stoke F.C. season =

Stoke
1920–21 season
- Chairman: Mr E.Reynish
- Manager: Arthur Shallcross
- Stadium: Victoria Ground
- Football League Second Division: 20th (35 Points)
- FA Cup: First Round
- Top goalscorer: League: Arthur Watkin (15); All: Arthur Watkin (16)
- Highest home attendance: 27,455 vs Port Vale (2 October 1920)
- Lowest home attendance: 5,000 vs Barnsley (2 March 1921)
- Average home league attendance: 13,315
Home colours

The 1920–21 season was Stoke's 21st in the Football League and the third in the Second Division.

Despite strengthening the Stoke squad with veteran Tom Brittleton the most notable signing Stoke struggled all season and were involved in a fight against relegation. With one team being relegated this season, Stoke finished five points from bottom place Stockport County which was too close for comfort.

== Season review ==
=== League ===
For the 1920–21 season efforts were made to strengthen the pool of players and the first of these was former England international Tom Brittleton who made the move from Sheffield Wednesday and immediately became club captain. Competition for places or not manager Arthur Shallcross maintained a settled side that is until in October when he transferred Charlie Parker to Sunderland. He had spent six years at Stoke and became a fan favourite.

A shortage of goals saw Stoke slip dangerously towards the lower regions of the Second Division as the 1920–21 season progressed and with only one club being relegated to the newly formed Third Division North the margin of five points and a 20th-place finish out of 22 was too close for comfort. Arthur Watkin top scored with 15 and Billy Tempest scored 10 however other than those two there was a lack of goals in the side.

A most significant signing in April 1921 was that of Bob McGrory, a full-back from Burnley. Rumours has it that McGrory had reservations about joining Stoke as he did not like the look of the place. Whether this was true or not, he went on to spend 31 years with the club as a player and manager eventually leaving the club in May 1952.

=== FA Cup ===
Stoke again exited the competition at the first hurdle losing 3–2 away at eventual runners-up Wolverhampton Wanderers in front of 35,000 spectators.

== Final league table ==
Pos	Team	Pld	W	D	L	GF	GA	GAv	Pts	Promotion or relegation
18	Nottingham Forest	42	12	12	18	48	55	0.873	36	
19	Rotherham County	42	12	12	18	37	53	0.698	36	
20	Stoke	42	12	11	19	46	56	0.821	35	
21	Coventry City	42	12	11	19	39	70	0.557	35	
22	Stockport County (R)	42	9	12	21	42	75	0.560	30	Relegation to the Third Division North

(R) Relegated

== Results ==
Stoke's score comes first

=== Legend ===
Win	Draw	Loss

=== Football League Second Division ===
Match	Date	Opponent	Venue	Result	Attendance	Scorers
1	28 August 1920	Nottingham Forest	A	2–2	21,000	Brown, Parker
2	30 August 1920	Rotherham County	H	2–0	10,000	Watkin, McColl
3	4 September 1920	Nottingham Forest	H	4–0	19,000	Watkin (3), McColl
4	6 September 1920	Rotherham County	A	1–1	15,000	Tempest
5	11 September 1920	The Wednesday	A	3–1	25,000	Tempest (2), Brown
6	18 September 1920	The Wednesday	H	0–1	30,000	
7	25 September 1920	Port Vale	A	1–2	19,967	McColl
8	2 October 1920	Port Vale	H	0–1	27,455	
9	9 October 1920	Notts County	H	1–0	10,000	Watkin
10	16 October 1920	Notts County	A	0–3	8,500	
11	23 October 1920	Coventry City	H	4–1	12,000	Tempest (2), McColl, Maddock
12	30 October 1920	Coventry City	A	0–1	18,000	
13	6 November 1920	Leeds United	H	4–0	14,000	Watkin (3), Brown
14	13 November 1920	Leeds United	A	0–0	20,000	
15	20 November 1920	Birmingham	H	1–2	15,000	Brown
16	27 November 1920	Birmingham	A	0–3	12,000	
17	4 December 1920	West Ham United	H	1–0	10,000	Brittleton
18	11 December 1920	West Ham United	A	0–1	15,000	
19	18 December 1920	Fulham	H	1–2	7,000	Brittleton
20	25 December 1920	Leicester City	A	1–3	20,000	Watkin
21	27 December 1920	Leicester City	H	1–1	15,000	Tempest
22	1 January 1921	Fulham	A	3–1	8,500	Watkin (2), Brittleton
23	15 January 1921	South Shields	A	1–1	15,000	Burton
24	22 January 1921	South Shields	H	0–0	5,000	
25	5 February 1921	Cardiff City	A	1–0	28,000	Watkin
26	12 February 1921	Hull City	A	1–1	5,000	Watkin
27	14 February 1921	Cardiff City	H	0–0	12,000	
28	26 February 1921	Wolverhampton Wanderers	A	3–3	20,000	Watkin, McColl, Smith
29	10 March 1921	Wolverhampton Wanderers	H	1–0	8,000	Tempest
30	12 March 1921	Stockport County	A	0–2	4,000	
31	19 March 1921	Stockport County	H	1–0	7,000	Watkin
32	25 March 1921	Blackpool	A	1–3	14,000	Whitehurst
33	26 March 1921	Clapton Orient	H	0–1	14,000	
34	28 March 1921	Blackpool	H	1–1	12,000	Tempest
35	2 April 1921	Clapton Orient	A	2–3	6,000	Whitehurst, Little
36	9 April 1921	Bury	H	0–1	7,000	
37	11 April 1921	Hull City	H	1–3	5,000	Tempest
38	16 April 1921	Bury	A	0–3	5,000	
39	23 April 1921	Bristol City	H	0–0	7,000	
40	30 April 1921	Bristol City	A	0–5	6,000	
41	2 May 1921	Barnsley	H	3–2	5,000	Tempest (pen), Brittleton, Helme
42	7 May 1921	Barnsley	A	0–1	7,000	

=== FA Cup ===
Round	Date	Opponent	Venue	Result	Attendance	Scorers
R1	8 January 1921	Wolverhampton Wanderers	A	2–3	35,000	Watkin, Burton

== Squad statistics ==
Pos.	Name	League		FA Cup		Total	
Pos.	Name	Apps	Goals	Apps	Goals	Apps	Goals
GK	(England) Tom Kay	27	0	1	0	28	0
GK	(England) Percy Knott	12	0	0	0	12	0
GK	(England) Edwin Steventon	3	0	0	0	3	0
DF	(England) Percy Brooke	7	0	1	0	8	0
DF	(England) Jack Maddock	8	1	0	0	8	1
DF	(Scotland) Bob McGrory	2	0	0	0	2	0
DF	(England) Alec Milne	42	0	1	0	43	0
DF	(England) Billy Twemlow	3	0	0	0	3	0
MF	(England) Tom Brittleton	41	4	1	0	42	4
MF	(England) George Clarke	41	0	1	0	42	0
MF	(Scotland) Bill Dickie	2	0	0	0	2	0
MF	(England) Reg Forester	7	0	0	0	7	0
MF	(England) Jack Moorwood	9	0	0	0	9	0
MF	(England) Charlie Parker	9	1	0	0	9	1
MF	(England) David Parkes	6	0	0	0	6	0
MF	(England) Dickie Smith	38	1	1	0	39	1
FW	(Scotland) David Brown	19	4	1	0	20	4
FW	(England) Matthew Burton	5	1	1	1	6	2
FW	(England) Harry Crossthwaite	18	0	1	0	19	0
FW	(England) Jack Helme	4	1	0	0	4	1
FW	(Scotland) George Jarvis	2	0	0	0	2	0
FW	(England) Tommy Little	17	1	0	0	17	1
FW	(England) James Martin	3	0	0	0	3	0
FW	(England) Wally Masterman	0	0	0	0	0	0
FW	(Scotland) Jimmy McColl	27	5	0	0	27	5
FW	(England) Syd Mellor	3	0	0	0	3	0
FW	(England) Tom Orpe	0	0	0	0	0	0
FW	(England) Louis Page	8	0	0	0	8	0
FW	(England) John Spencer	16	0	0	0	16	0
FW	(England) Billy Tempest	37	10	1	0	38	10
FW	(England) Arthur Watkin	35	15	1	1	36	16
FW	(England) Albert Whitehurst	11	2	0	0	11	2
