= William Wood (footballer, born 1900) =

English footballer

Personal information
- Full name: William Wood
- Date of birth: 1900
- Place of birth: Stoke-on-Trent, England
- Position: Outside right

Senior career*
Years	Team	Apps	(Gls)
1924–1925	Stoke	0	(0)
1925–1926	Aberdare Athletic	2	(0)
Total		2	(0)
- * Club domestic league appearances and goals

William Wood (born 1900, date of death unknown) was a footballer who played in the Football League for Aberdare Athletic and Stoke. He was born in Stoke-on-Trent, England.

== Career statistics ==
Appearances and goals by club, season and competition
Club	Season	League			FA Cup		Total	
Club	Season	Division	Apps	Goals	Apps	Goals	Apps	Goals
Stoke	1924–25	Second Division	0	0	0	0	0	0
Aberdare Athletic	1925–26	Third Division South	2	0	0	0	2	0
Career total			2	0	0	0	2	0
