= George Stentiford =

English footballer

Personal information
- Full name: George Stentiford
- Date of birth: 7 May 1900
- Place of birth: Brentford, England
- Date of death: 1976 (aged 76)
- Height: 5 ft 10 in (1.78 m)
- Position: Right half

Senior career*
Years	Team	Apps	(Gls)
1919–1921	Kingstonian	73	(33)
1922	Huddersfield Town	0	(0)
1923–1924	Stoke	11	(0)
1924–1926	Stockport County	43	(0)
–	Guildford United		
Total		127	(33)
- * Club domestic league appearances and goals

George Stentiford (7 May 1900 – 1976) was an English footballer who played in the Football League for Stockport County and Stoke.

== Career ==
Born in Brentford, Stentiford started his career with non-league Kingstonian in the Athenian League. He impressed at right half and he earned a move north to Football League side Huddersfield Town. Without making an appearance for the "Terriers", he joined Stoke and played eight matches during the 1923–24 season and three more in the following campaign before joining Stockport County in 1924. He spent two years at Edgeley Park and returned to the south with Guildford United.

== Career statistics ==
Appearances and goals by club, season and competition
Club	Season	League			FA Cup		Total	
Club	Season	Division	Apps	Goals	Apps	Goals	Apps	Goals
Stoke	1923–24	Second Division	8	0	0	0	8	0
Stoke	1924–25	Second Division	3	0	0	0	3	0
Stoke	Total		11	0	0	0	11	0
Stockport County	1924–25	Second Division	33	0	2	0	35	0
Stockport County	1925–26	Second Division	10	0	0	0	10	0
Stockport County	Total		43	0	2	0	45	0
Career total			57	0	2	0	59	0
