= Edgar Powell =

Welsh footballer

Personal information
- Full name: Edgar Powell
- Date of birth: 6 January 1899
- Place of birth: Cardiff, Wales
- Date of death: 1955 (aged 56)
- Position: Forward

Senior career*
Years	Team	Apps	(Gls)
- Barry Town
- Denaby United
1923–1924	Huddersfield Town	0	(0)
1924–1925	Stoke	2	(0)
1925–1926	Accrington Stanley	65	(17)
1927–1928	Merthyr Town	23	(4)
1928–1929	Barrow	1	(0)
Total		91	(21)
- * Club domestic league appearances and goals

Edgar Powell (6 January 1899 – 1955) was a Welsh footballer who played in the Football League for Accrington Stanley, Barrow, Merthyr Town and Stoke.

== Career ==
Powell was born in Cardiff and played for Barry Town and Denaby United before joining Huddersfield Town. He left Huddersfield having never made an appearance and played twice for Stoke in 1924–25. He enjoyed a better time at Accrington Stanley scoring 17 league goals in 65 matches. Powell then had short spells with Merthyr Town and Barrow.

== Career statistics ==
Club	Season	League			FA Cup		Total	
Club	Season	Division	Apps	Goals	Apps	Goals	Apps	Goals
Stoke	1924–25	Second Division	2	0	0	0	2	0
Accrington Stanley	1925–26	Third Division North	41	11	3	1	44	12
Accrington Stanley	1926–27	Third Division North	24	6	3	1	27	7
Merthyr Town	1927–28	Third Division South	23	4	1	0	24	4
Barrow	1928–29	Third Division North	1	0	0	0	1	0
Career Total			91	21	7	2	98	23
