= Alfred Jones (footballer, born 1902) =

English footballer

Personal information
- Full name: Alfred Jones
- Date of birth: 1902
- Place of birth: Hanley, England
- Position: Forward

Senior career*
Years	Team	Apps	(Gls)
1920–1921	Port Vale	0	(0)
1921–1923	Crewe Alexandra	5	(0)
1923–1924	Congleton Town		
1924–1925	Stoke	5	(1)
1925–192?	Congleton Town		
- * Club domestic league appearances and goals

Alfred Jones (born 1902; date of death unknown) was an English footballer who played in the English Football League for Crewe Alexandra and Stoke.

== Career ==
Jones was born in Hanley and started his career at Crewe Alexandra where he made five appearances in the Football League Third Division North. He then joined Congleton Town before moving to Stoke, where again he made five appearances, scoring once against Hull City in November 1924. At the end of the 1924–25 season he re-joined Congleton.

== Career statistics ==
Appearances and goals by club, season and competition
Club	Season	League			FA Cup		Total	
Club	Season	Division	Apps	Goals	Apps	Goals	Apps	Goals
Port Vale	1920–21	Second Division	0	0	0	0	0	0
Crewe Alexandra	1921–22	Third Division North	5	0	0	0	5	0
Stoke	1924–25	Second Division	5	1	0	0	5	1
Career total			10	1	0	0	10	1
