= Tommy Howe =

English footballer

Personal information
- Full name: Thomas Howe
- Date of birth: 6 May 1892
- Place of birth: Wolverhampton, England
- Date of death: 1957 (aged 65)
- Place of death: Cannock, England
- Height: 5 ft 9 in (1.75 m)
- Position: Left-back

Senior career*
Years	Team	Apps	(Gls)
1920	Sunbeam Motors		
1921–1925	Stoke	56	(2)
1926	Featherstone Rovers		
- * Club domestic league appearances and goals

Thomas Howe (6 May 1892 – 1957) was an English footballer who played in the Football League for Stoke.

== Career ==
Howe was signed as a reserve defender to Bob McGrory, Howe was at the Victoria Ground for five years and had a couple of decent runs in the first-team, the best being 24 appearances in the 1923–24 season. After his release in 1925 he spent eight months out of the game before joining Featherstone Rovers.

== Career statistics ==
Appearances and goals by club, season and competition
Club	Season	League			FA Cup		Total	
Club	Season	Division	Apps	Goals	Apps	Goals	Apps	Goals
Stoke	1921–22	Second Division	1	0	0	0	1	0
Stoke	1922–23	First Division	6	0	0	0	6	0
Stoke	1923–24	Second Division	24	1	0	0	24	1
Stoke	1924–25	Second Division	19	0	0	0	19	0
Stoke	1925–26	Second Division	6	1	0	0	6	1
Career total			56	2	0	0	56	2
