= Jack Helme =

English footballer

Personal information
- Full name: James Albert Helme
- Date of birth: 1897
- Place of birth: Altrincham, England
- Position: Inside left

Senior career*
Years	Team	Apps	(Gls)
1919	Altrincham		
1920–1921	Stoke	4	(1)
1921	Altrincham		
- * Club domestic league appearances and goals

James Albert "Jack" Helme (born 1897) was an English footballer who played in the Football League for Stoke.

== Career ==
Helme was born in Altrincham and played for his local team in the Cheshire County League. He impressed enough with "Alty" to earn a move to Football League side Stoke for the 1920–21 season. He played four matches for Stoke scoring once against Barnsley in a 3–2 victory on 2 May 1921. At the end of the season he rejoined Altrincham.

== Career statistics ==
Club	Season	League			FA Cup		Total	
Club	Season	Division	Apps	Goals	Apps	Goals	Apps	Goals
Stoke	1920–21	Second Division	4	1	0	0	4	1
Career Total			4	1	0	0	4	1
