= Bob Rutherford (footballer) =

English footballer

Personal information
- Full name: Robert Edward Rutherford
- Date of birth: 1878
- Place of birth: Gateshead, England
- Position: Defender

Senior career*
| Years | Team | Apps | (Gls) |
| 1905–1906 | Newcastle United | 1 | (0) |
- * Club domestic league appearances and goals

Robert Edward Rutherford (born 1878) was an English footballer.

== Career ==
Rutherford played in the Football League for Newcastle United. His brothers Sep and Jock were also professional footballers as well as his nephew John.
