= Joseph Depledge =

English footballer

Personal information
- Full name: Joseph Depledge
- Date of birth: 15 April 1897
- Place of birth: Sheffield, England
- Date of death: 1974 (aged 76–77)
- Height: 5 ft 10 1/2 in (1.79 m)
- Position: Centre half

Senior career*
Years	Team	Apps	(Gls)
1922	Rotherham Town		
1923–1924	Stoke	5	(0)
1924	Mansfield Town		
- * Club domestic league appearances and goals

Joseph Depledge (15 April 1897 – 1974) was a footballer who played in the Football League for Stoke. He made five appearances for Stoke.

== Career ==
Depledge was born in Sheffield, and started playing football for Rotherham Town who were playing in the Midland League and he performed well earning him a move to League side Stoke. He played five matches for Stoke in the 1923–24 season and was released by manager Tom Mather at the end of the campaign. He later played for Mansfield Town.

== Career statistics ==
Appearances and goals by club, season and competition
Club	Season	League			FA Cup		Total	
Club	Season	Division	Apps	Goals	Apps	Goals	Apps	Goals
Stoke	1923–24	Second Division	5	0	0	0	5	0
Career Total			5	0	0	0	5	0
