= John Brittleton =

English footballer

Personal information
- Full name: John Thomas Brittleton
- Date of birth: 5 May 1906
- Place of birth: Winsford, England
- Date of death: 1982 (aged 76)
- Height: 1.78 m (5 ft 10 in)
- Position: Defender

Senior career*
Years	Team	Apps	(Gls)
1925–1927	Chester		
1927–1930	Aston Villa	10	(0)
- * Club domestic league appearances and goals

John Brittleton (5 May 1906 – 1982) was an English footballer who played in the Football League for Aston Villa. His father Tom was also a professional footballer who played for England.

== Career ==
=== Aston Villa ===
On 7 November 1927, Brittleton signed for Aston Villa from Chester.
