= Jock Rutherford =

English footballer and manager (1884–1963)

Personal information
- Date of birth: 12 October 1884
- Place of birth: Percy Main, Northumberland, England
- Date of death: 21 April 1963 (aged 78)
- Height: 5 ft 8 1/2 in (1.74 m)
- Position: Outside right

Senior career*
Years	Team	Apps	(Gls)
1902–1913	Newcastle United	290	(78)
1913–1923	Arsenal	177	(21)
1923	Stoke	0	(0)
1923–1926	Arsenal	45	(4)
1926–1927	Clapton Orient	9	(0)
1928	Tunbridge Wells Rangers		
Total		521	(103)

International career
1904–1908	England	11	(3)

Managerial career
- 1923: Stoke
- * Club domestic league appearances and goals

Woolwich Arsenal in 1913. Photographed by Coloursport studio. Back row: L to R. George Grant, George Jobey, Joseph Shaw, Joseph Lievesley, Robert william Benson, G.Hardy (trainer), Percy Robert Sands, G. Morrell (sec), Angus McKinnon. Front Row: Thomas Winship (kneeling), John Jock Rutherford, John Flanagan, Donald Slade, Harold Wally Hardinge, Charles Henry Lewis, S. Stanley (kneeling).

John Rutherford (12 October 1884 – 21 April 1963) was an English footballer who played in the Football League for Arsenal, Clapton Orient and Newcastle United. He played 11 times for England, and had a short and unsuccessful spell as manager of Stoke.

== Club career ==
Born in Percy Main, North Shields, Northumberland, Rutherford was known for his longevity; he played nearly six hundred Football League and FA Cup matches, despite four seasons of football being cancelled due to World War I. He started his career at Newcastle United, making his debut in 1902 against West Bromwich Albion, scoring twice. Nicknamed "the Newcastle flyer", he spent ten seasons at the "Magpies", as an outside right renowned for his pace and close control. Newcastle were a dominant force at the time with Rutherford picking up three First Division medals, and played in five FA Cup finals. Although Newcastle only won the 1910 final against Barnsley, by 2–1 in a replay. Rutherford himself scored the equaliser in the first match, in the very last minute of normal time for a 1–1 draw.

At the start of the 1913–14 season, Rutherford fell out with the Newcastle management over his wages, and he was promptly sold to Woolwich Arsenal, who had just been relegated to the Second Division. He made his Arsenal debut against Nottingham Forest on 1 November 1913 and scored twice in a 3–2 win, and quickly became a regular in the side. When the First World War broke out, Rutherford continued to guest for Arsenal in wartime matches. Despite being 35 when first-class football resumed in 1919, he continued to play regularly for Arsenal who had been promoted back to the First Division for another four seasons.

In March 1923 Rutherford was approached by Stoke, who had heard that he interested into moving into management. There were testing times for Stoke who after being promoted to the First Division the year before were now four points adrift at the bottom of the table with one win in 11. So it seemed perfect timing for Rutherford, at the age of 38 he was being offered not only the chance to take over the reins of a First Division club but to continue playing in a player-manager role, an offer he found too good to refuse. It was only when he arrived at the Victoria Ground on 3 April that he realised what poor condition the club was in. With five games of the 1922–23 season left, Stoke needed to win four to have any chance of staying up. It didn't happen and Stoke suffered relegation to the Second Division but there was optimism that an instant return could be had with Rutherford in charge.

But a strange set of circumstances led to his swift departure. Firstly his old club Arsenal held a retirement party for him where he was presented with a silver tea set. But instead of the party and gift acting as closure with Arsenal, it merely served to reacquaint him with former friends. Then he was involved in a car accident which left him unable to return to Stoke-on-Trent for the start of the 1923–24 season. Then the saga took a bizarre twist: as Stoke were still waiting him to return to the club, Rutherford instead quit and re-signed as a player for Arsenal. In total, he was in charge of Stoke for just four weeks, making him the club's shortest-serving manager.

The 39-year-old Rutherford re-signed for Arsenal in September, and played over twenty matches in each of the next two seasons. He retired in the summer of 1925, but found the temptation to play football too much, and promptly signed for Arsenal for a third time in January 1926, and played for the remainder of that season. He played his final match for the Gunners against Manchester City on 20 March 1926, at the age of 41 years and 159 days. With that, Rutherford set a record, as Arsenal's oldest ever first-team player, which still stands to this day.

Rutherford left Arsenal for the final time in the summer of 1926; in all, he played 232 matches and scored 27 goals for the club. He spent a single season at Clapton Orient before finally hanging his boots up in 1927. In 1928 he came out of retirement and signed for Tunbridge Wells Rangers, playing in only one game in the FA Cup. After retiring, he settled in Neasden and ran an off-licence.

== International career ==
While at Newcastle, Rutherford also played for England, making his debut against Wales on 9 April 1904. He went on to win eleven caps for his country and score three goals, making his last appearance against Bohemia, a country that technically did not exist at the time, in 1908.

== Family ==
Rutherford's brothers Sep and Bob were also professional footballers. He was married twice: first to Edith Olive McQueen in May 1908 – with whom he had a son, John, who was on Arsenal's books at the same time as his father, but only ever played one League match for the club – and then to Blodwen Jones in 1944. His great-grandson Greg Rutherford is the 2012 Olympic long jump champion.

== Career statistics ==
=== As a player ===
Appearances and goals by club, season and competition
Club	Season	League			FA Cup		Total	
Club	Season	Division	Apps	Goals	Apps	Goals	Apps	Goals
Newcastle United	1901–02	First Division	11	5	0	0	11	5
Newcastle United	1902–03	First Division	22	6	0	0	22	6
Newcastle United	1903–04	First Division	33	7	1	0	34	7
Newcastle United	1904–05	First Division	31	10	5	0	36	10
Newcastle United	1905–06	First Division	34	9	8	2	42	11
Newcastle United	1906–07	First Division	34	10	1	0	35	10
Newcastle United	1907–08	First Division	19	11	6	4	25	15
Newcastle United	1908–09	First Division	24	5	5	2	29	7
Newcastle United	1909–10	First Division	24	8	7	4	31	12
Newcastle United	1910–11	First Division	15	1	5	1	20	2
Newcastle United	1911–12	First Division	23	4	1	0	24	4
Newcastle United	1912–13	First Division	20	2	5	1	25	3
Newcastle United	Total		290	78	44	14	334	92
Arsenal	1913–14	Second Division	21	6	0	0	21	6
Arsenal	1914–15	Second Division	26	3	2	0	28	3
Arsenal	1919–20	First Division	36	3	2	1	38	4
Arsenal	1920–21	First Division	32	7	1	0	33	7
Arsenal	1921–22	First Division	36	1	4	1	40	2
Arsenal	1922–23	First Division	26	1	0	0	26	1
Arsenal	Total		177	21	9	2	186	23
Stoke	1922–23	First Division	0	0	0	0	0	0
Arsenal	1923–24	First Division	22	2	0	0	22	2
Arsenal	1924–25	First Division	20	2	0	0	20	2
Arsenal	1925–26	First Division	3	0	1	0	4	0
Arsenal	Total		45	4	1	0	46	4
Clapton Orient	1926–27	Second Division	9	0	0	0	9	0
Career total			521	103	54	16	575	119

=== International ===
National team	Year	Apps	Goals
England	1904	1	0
England	1907	3	0
England	1908	7	3
Total		11	3

=== As a manager ===
Managerial record by club and tenure
Team	From	To	Record				
Team	From	To	P	W	D	L	Win %
Stoke	1 March 1923	6 May 1923	11	2	3	6	18.2
Total			11	2	3	6	18.2

== Honours ==
=== Club ===
Newcastle United

- First Division: 1904–05, 1906–07, 1908–09
- FA Cup: 1910
- FA Charity Shield: 1909

=== Individual ===
- Newcastle United Hall of Fame
