= Robert Depledge =

English footballer

Personal information
- Full name: Robert Percy Depledge
- Date of birth: 1882
- Place of birth: Litherland, England
- Date of death: 1930 (aged 47–48)
- Place of death: Nottingham, England
- Position: Goalkeeper

Senior career*
Years	Team	Apps	(Gls)
1906–1907	Everton	1	(0)
1908	Wallasey Village		
- Linfield
1911–1912	Wrexham	3	(0)
Total		4	(0)
- * Club domestic league appearances and goals

Robert Percy Depledge (1882–1930) was an English footballer who played in the Football League for Everton. He also played for Wallasey Village, Linfield and Wrexham.
