= Joe Kasher =

English footballer

Personal information
- Full name: Joseph William Robinson Kasher
- Date of birth: 14 January 1894
- Place of birth: Willington, England
- Date of death: 8 January 1992 (aged 97)
- Place of death: Middlesbrough, England
- Height: 5 ft 10 1/2 in (1.79 m)
- Position: Half back

Senior career*
Years	Team	Apps	(Gls)
1912	Hunwick Juniors		
1913	Willington		
1914	Crook Town		
1919–1922	Sunderland	86	(0)
1922–1924	Stoke	52	(1)
1924–1925	Carlisle United		
1925–1926	Accrington Stanley	47	(2)
Total		185	(3)
- * Club domestic league appearances and goals

Joseph William Robinson Kasher (14 January 1894 – 8 January 1992) was an English footballer who played in the Football League for Accrington Stanley, Sunderland and Stoke.

== Career ==
Kasher played for Hunwick Juniors, Willington, Crook Town before joining Sunderland in 1919. He established himself in the "Black Cats" midfield for three seasons after World War I playing in 90 matches. He joined Stoke in October 1922 and played 31 times in 1922–23 and 24 times in 1923–24. He then spent a season with Carlisle United and then two years at Accrington Stanley.

== Death ==
Kasher died in 1992, aged 97.

== Career statistics ==
Appearances and goals by club, season and competition
Club	Season	League			FA Cup		Total	
Club	Season	Division	Apps	Goals	Apps	Goals	Apps	Goals
Sunderland	1919–20	First Division	24	0	3	0	27	0
Sunderland	1920–21	First Division	27	0	0	0	27	0
Sunderland	1921–22	First Division	31	0	1	0	32	0
Sunderland	1922–23	First Division	4	0	0	0	4	0
Sunderland	Total		86	0	4	0	90	0
Stoke	1922–23	First Division	29	0	2	0	31	0
Stoke	1923–24	Second Division	23	1	1	0	24	1
Stoke	Total		52	1	3	0	55	1
Accrington Stanley	1925–26	Third Division North	30	1	1	0	31	1
Accrington Stanley	1926–27	Third Division North	17	1	1	0	18	1
Accrington Stanley	Total		47	2	2	0	49	2
Career total			185	3	8	0	194	3
