= Tom Kay (footballer, born 1892) =

English footballer

Personal information
- Full name: Thomas Kay
- Date of birth: November 1892
- Place of birth: Mossley, England
- Date of death: 1940 (aged 48)
- Height: 5 ft 8 1/2 in (1.74 m)
- Position: Goalkeeper

Senior career*
| Years | Team | Apps | (Gls) |
- Walkden
| 1914–1915 | Bolton Wanderers | 0 | (0) |
| 1919–1921 | Stoke | 75 | (0) |
- * Club domestic league appearances and goals

Thomas Kay (November 1892 – 1940) was an English footballer who played in the Football League for Stoke.

== Career ==
Kay was born in Mossley and played amateur football with Walkden before joining Bolton Wanderers but due to the outbreak of World War I was never able to make an appearance for Bolton. After the war he joined Stoke and was an ever-present in 1919–20 making 43 appearances he continued to be 1st choice in 1920–21 making 70 constitutive appearances. He was dropped by manager Arthur Shallcross after he conceded five goals against Bristol City and only played in six matches in 1921–22 before being released at the end of the season.

== Career statistics ==
| Club | Season | League | | | FA Cup | | Total | |
| Club | Season | Division | Apps | Goals | Apps | Goals | Apps | Goals |
|---|---|---|---|---|---|---|---|---|
| Stoke | 1919–20 | Second Division | 42 | 0 | 1 | 0 | 43 | 0 |
| Stoke | 1920–21 | Second Division | 27 | 0 | 1 | 0 | 28 | 0 |
| Stoke | 1921–22 | Second Division | 6 | 0 | 0 | 0 | 6 | 0 |
| Career Total | | | 75 | 0 | 2 | 0 | 77 | 0 |
