= Arthur Shallcross =

English football manager (1876–1950)

Personal information
- Date of birth: 1876
- Place of birth: Leek, England
- Date of death: 1950 (aged 73–74)
- Place of death: Stoke-on-Trent, England

Managerial career
- Years: Team
- 1919–1923: Stoke

Arthur J. Shallcross (1876 – 1950) was an English association football manager who managed Stoke City between February 1919 and March 1923.

== Career ==
Shallcross played for his native Leek before becoming a Football League referee in 1895. He was appointed secretary-manager of Stoke in February 1919, in time for Stoke's first season back in the league since 1908. A steady season of mid-table followed in 1919–20 but Shallcross then angered the supporters with the seemingly unnecessary sale of Charlie Parker to Sunderland, but he did bring in Bob McGrory who would have a long career at the Victoria Ground.

After almost being relegated in 1920–21 Stoke finished second in 1921–22 to gain a return to the First Division. Key to Stoke's success was the early season signing of the Broad brothers Tommy and Jimmy with the later scoring 27 goals. However any hope that it be the start of a sustained spell in the top-flight was quickly dashed as Stoke struggled all through the 1922–23 season and with relegation looming Shallcross was sacked in March 1923.

== Managerial statistics ==
Managerial record by club and tenure
Team	From	To	Record				
Team	From	To	P	W	D	L	Win %
Stoke	1 February 1919	31 March 1923	171	59	43	69	34.5
Total			171	59	43	69	34.5

== Honours ==
- Football League Second Division runner-up: 1921–22
