= Jimmy Broad =

English footballer

Personal information
- Full name: James Broad
- Date of birth: 10 November 1891
- Place of birth: Stalybridge, England
- Date of death: 22 August 1963 (aged 71)
- Place of death: Chelmsford, England
- Height: 5 ft 7 1/2 in (1.71 m)
- Positions: Centre forward; inside right

Senior career*
Years	Team	Apps	(Gls)
- St. Mark's (West Gorton)
- Stalybridge Celtic
1911	Manchester City	0	(0)
1912	Manchester United	0	(0)
1913–1914	Oldham Athletic	15	(5)
- Morton
1920	Millwall Athletic	9	(6)
1921–1924	Stoke	108	(62)
- Sittingbourne
1924–1925	Everton	18	(8)
1925	New Brighton	11	(3)
1926	Watford	1	(1)
- Caernarvon Town
- Taunton Town
1929	New Brighton	0	(0)
- Fleetwood
Total		162	(85)

Managerial career
- 1929–1930: Spezia
- * Club domestic league appearances and goals

James Broad (10 November 1891 – 22 August 1963) was an English footballer who played as a forward for various Football League clubs in the 1910s and 1920s, including Oldham Athletic, Stoke and Everton. His brother Tommy was also a footballer.

== Career ==
Born in Stalybridge, Cheshire (now Greater Manchester), Broad began his football career with St Mark's (West Gorton), before moving to Stalybridge Celtic. He joined Manchester City in 1911, Manchester United in 1912, and then Oldham Athletic in 1913, without having made an appearance for either United or City. In his one season with Oldham, Broad made 15 appearances and scored five goals, but he was allowed to join Morton of Scotland in 1914. He returned to England with Millwall in 1919, scoring 39 goals in 54 games for the club, mostly in the Southern Football League.

Broad was brought to Stoke by wealthy director John Slater along with his brother Tommy. The idea was that winger Tommy would supply crosses for Jimmy to convert and it worked very well as in 1921–22 Stoke gained promotion with Jimmy top-scoring with 27 goals. However Stoke struggled in the First Division and despite Jimmy scoring 26 goals Stoke were relegated back to the Second Division. In 1923–24 a promotion challenge failed to materialise and at the end of the season the board decided to reduce the wage bill by releasing ten players which included the Broad brothers. Jimmy and eight unwanted teammates arrived at the Victoria Ground and ransacked the offices causing a considerable amount of damage.

He joined Everton in 1924, via Sittingbourne, and scored eight goals in 18 games for the Toffees. In 1925, he moved to New Brighton, for whom he scored three goals in 11 matches, and then he joined Watford in 1926. After just one game for Watford, in which he scored a goal, Broad was sacked for a breach of discipline. He moved into non-league football with Caernarvon Town and Taunton Town, before returning to New Brighton at the age of 38. However, he did not make any appearances for New Brighton before joining Fleetwood.

He then went on to do some coaching with Deportivo de La Coruña in Spain as well as in Turkey, Switzerland, Italy, Norway, Holland and South Africa. At the age of 40 in 1931 he finally settled down taking up the post of groundsman at Chelmsford City a position he kept until his death in 1963.

== Career statistics ==
Appearances and goals by club, season and competition
Club	Season	League			FA Cup		Total	
Club	Season	Division	Apps	Goals	Apps	Goals	Apps	Goals
Oldham Athletic	1913–14	First Division	10	4	0	0	10	4
Oldham Athletic	1914–15	First Division	5	1	0	0	5	1
Oldham Athletic	Total		15	5	0	0	15	5
Millwall Athletic	1920–21	Third Division	9	6	1	0	10	6
Stoke	1921–22	Second Division	41	25	5	2	46	27
Stoke	1922–23	First Division	30	23	2	3	32	26
Stoke	1923–24	Second Division	37	14	1	0	38	14
Stoke	Total		108	62	8	5	116	67
Everton	1924–25	First Division	14	8	3	0	17	8
Everton	1925–26	First Division	4	0	0	0	4	0
Everton	Total		18	8	3	0	21	8
New Brighton	1925–26	Third Division North	11	3	2	1	13	4
Watford	1926–27	Third Division South	1	1	1	0	2	1
Career total			162	85	15	6	177	91

== Honours ==
Stoke

- Football League Second Division runner-up: 1922–23
