= Victor Staley =

English footballer

Personal information
- Full name: Clive Howard Victor Staley
- Date of birth: 14 May 1899
- Place of birth: Newhall, Derbyshire, England
- Date of death: 18 March 1985 (aged 85)
- Place of death: Burton upon Trent, England
- Height: 5 ft 8 in (1.73 m)
- Position: Forward

Senior career*
| Years | Team | Apps | (Gls) |
| 1920–1921 | Newhall Swifts | | |
| 1921–1922 | Sunderland | 1 | (0) |
| 1922–1923 | Stoke | 0 | (0) |
| 1923–1924 | Newhall Swifts | | |
| 1924–192? | Burton All Saints | | |
- * Club domestic league appearances and goals

Clive Howard Victor Staley (14 May 1899 – 18 March 1985) was an English professional footballer who played as a forward for Sunderland.
