= Percy Knott =

English footballer

Personal information
- Full name: Percy Knott
- Date of birth: 1899
- Place of birth: Stoke-upon-Trent, England
- Height: 5 ft 10 1/2 in (1.79 m)
- Position: Goalkeeper

Senior career*
Years	Team	Apps	(Gls)
1919	Hartshill White Star		
1920–1921	Stoke	27	(0)
1922	Queens Park Rangers	0	(0)
1925	Stoke City	1	(0)
- * Club domestic league appearances and goals

Percy Knott (1899 – unknown) was an English footballer who played in the Football League for Stoke.

== Career ==
Knott was born in Stoke-upon-Trent and played for Hartshill White Star before joining Stoke just after World War I. He was used as understudy to Tom Kay due to injury to Kay, Knott played twelve matches towards the end of the 1920–21 season and fifteen during 1921–22. He left Stoke in 1922 and joined Queens Park Rangers where he never managed to get a match. After a three-year gap Knott played one match for Stoke during the 1925–26 season.

== Career statistics ==
Appearances and goals by club, season and competition
Club	Season	League			FA Cup		Total	
Club	Season	Division	Apps	Goals	Apps	Goals	Apps	Goals
Stoke	1920–21	Second Division	12	0	0	0	12	0
Stoke	1921–22	Second Division	15	0	2	0	17	0
Stoke	1925–26	Second Division	1	0	0	0	1	0
Career total			28	0	2	0	30	0
