= 1923–24 Stoke F.C. season =

Stoke
1923–24 season
- Chairman: Mr E.Reynish
- Manager: Tom Mather
- Stadium: Victoria Ground
- Football League Second Division: 6th (46 Points)
- FA Cup: First Round
- Top goalscorer: League: Jimmy Broad (14); All: Jimmy Broad (14)
- Highest home attendance: 25,297 vs Bury (22 March 1924)
- Lowest home attendance: 6,000 vs Hull City (27 October 1923)
- Average home league attendance: 11,765
Home colours

The 1923–24 season was Stoke's 24th season in the Football League and the fifth in the Second Division.

With Stoke back in the Second Division after their short stay in the First and without a manager the supporters questioned what the future held for the club. Tom Mather was appointed as the club's new manager in October 1923 and it would start a run of consistency as from 1923 to 1976 Stoke had just four managers. Mather led the club to sixth position in the table with just two wins in their last 12 matches costing Stoke a promotion challenge. At the end of the season Mather decided to sell a number of players including fans favourites Jimmy Broad, Tommy Broad and Billy Tempest; some players not asked to re-sign smashed up the offices at the Victoria Ground and caused a considerable amount of damage.

== Season review ==
=== League ===
There was little money available for new players, and when former Southend United boss Tom Mather, a Lancastrian from Chorley, was given the managerial position in October, he quickly set about restoring the team's fortunes. Mather, who had been assistant manager at both Manchester City and Bolton Wanderers before becoming manager at Burnden Park during World War I, certainly consolidated the club and a final league finish of 6th was a decent outcome and would give Mather a platform to build on.

There was however a regrettable incident at the club just as the season ended when a group of players, who had not been asked to re-sign for the next season, arrived at the Victoria Ground and started smashing up the offices and dressing rooms, causing a considerable amount of damage. The offenders were immediately released by the club and things were quickly sorted out. There was a substantial clear-out, with a number of players leaving who had served the club well whilst there was also changes at boardroom level with chairman Mr E. Reynish relinquishing his position as chairman and wealthy director John Slater also left after he had injected a lot of his own money into the club with mixed success.

=== FA Cup ===
No progress was made in the FA Cup with Stoke going out in the first round to Leeds United.

== Final league table ==
Pos	Team	Pld	W	D	L	GF	GA	GAv	Pts
4	Blackpool	42	18	13	11	72	47	1.532	49
5	Southampton	42	17	14	11	52	31	1.677	48
6	Stoke	42	14	18	10	44	42	1.048	46
7	Oldham Athletic	42	14	17	11	45	52	0.865	45
8	The Wednesday	42	16	12	14	54	51	1.059	44

== Results ==
Stoke's score comes first

=== Legend ===
Win	Draw	Loss

=== Football League Second Division ===
Match	Date	Opponent	Venue	Result	Attendance	Scorers
1	25 August 1923	Leeds United	H	1–1	20,000	J Broad
2	27 August 1923	Leicester City	A	0–5	14,500	
3	1 September 1923	Leeds United	A	0–0	15,000	
4	3 September 1923	Leicester City	H	1–0	11,000	Davies
5	8 September 1923	Blackpool	H	2–2	11,898	Davies, Richardson
6	15 September 1923	Blackpool	A	1–1	6,000	Davies
7	22 September 1923	Nelson	H	4–0	12,150	Davies (2), J Broad, Howe
8	24 September 1923	Southampton	H	1–1	20,000	Richardson
9	29 September 1923	Nelson	A	0–2	12,000	
10	6 October 1923	Port Vale	H	1–0	21,685	Clarke
11	13 October 1923	Port Vale	A	4–2	16,800	J Broad (2), Eyres (2)
12	15 October 1923	Southampton	A	1–0	14,000	Kelly
13	20 October 1923	Hull City	A	0–2	8,000	
14	27 October 1923	Hull City	H	1–0	6,000	Kasher
15	3 November 1923	Derby County	H	1–1	20,000	J Broad
16	10 November 1923	Derby County	A	1–1	12,000	Eyres
17	17 November 1923	Crystal Palace	H	1–1	9,000	J Broad
18	24 November 1923	Crystal Palace	A	1–5	15,000	Eyres
19	1 December 1923	The Wednesday	H	1–1	8,000	Eyres
20	8 December 1923	The Wednesday	A	0–3	14,000	
21	15 December 1923	Coventry City	A	2–1	12,000	J Broad, Eyres
22	22 December 1923	Coventry City	H	2–1	6,000	J Broad, Eyres
23	26 December 1923	Bradford City	H	2–0	18,000	J Broad, Davies
24	29 December 1923	Bristol City	A	1–1	7,000	J Broad
25	5 January 1924	Bristol City	H	3–0	10,300	Davies (2), Clarke
26	19 January 1924	Clapton Orient	H	0–1	11,000	
27	26 January 1924	Clapton Orient	A	2–0	7,700	J Broad, Sellars
28	2 February 1924	Stockport County	H	0–0	13,800	
29	9 February 1924	Stockport County	A	1–0	4,000	Roxburgh
30	16 February 1924	Oldham Athletic	H	1–1	6,000	Davies
31	23 February 1924	Oldham Athletic	A	0–0	5,000	
32	1 March 1924	South Shields	H	0–0	8,348	
33	8 March 1924	South Shields	A	0–1	6,000	
34	15 March 1924	Bury	A	0–1	6,000	
35	22 March 1924	Bury	H	0–0	25,297	
36	29 March 1924	Manchester United	A	2–2	10,000	J Broad, Tempest
37	5 April 1924	Manchester United	H	3–0	20,000	J Broad, Tempest, Sellars
38	12 April 1924	Barnsley	H	2–0	9,799	Sellars (2)
39	19 April 1924	Barnsley	A	0–0	6,224	
40	21 April 1924	Fulham	A	0–3	10,000	
41	23 April 1924	Fulham	H	0–0	8,000	
42	26 April 1924	Bradford City	A	1–2	4,000	J Broad

=== FA Cup ===
Round	Date	Opponent	Venue	Result	Attendance	Scorers
R1	12 January 1924	Leeds United	A	0–1	26,574	

== Squad statistics ==
Pos.	Name	League		FA Cup		Total	
Pos.	Name	Apps	Goals	Apps	Goals	Apps	Goals
GK	(Scotland) Kenny Campbell	11	0	0	0	11	0
GK	(England) Bob Dixon	31	0	1	0	32	0
DF	(England) Sammy Davis	2	0	0	0	2	0
DF	(England) Tommy Howe	24	1	0	0	24	1
DF	(Scotland) George Lennon	1	0	0	0	1	0
DF	(Scotland) Bob McGrory	29	0	1	0	30	0
DF	(England) Billy Wootton	0	0	0	0	0	0
MF	(England) Ewart Beswick	5	0	0	0	5	0
MF	(England) Tom Brittleton	35	0	1	0	36	0
MF	(England) Harry Brough	33	0	0	0	33	0
MF	(England) George Clarke	18	2	1	0	19	2
MF	(England) Joseph Depledge	5	0	0	0	5	0
MF	(England) Wilf Edwards	0	0	0	0	0	0
MF	(England) Billy Fitchford	0	0	0	0	0	0
MF	(Ireland) Alfred Jordan	2	0	0	0	2	0
MF	(England) Joe Kasher	23	1	1	0	24	1
MF	(England) Arden Maddison	1	0	0	0	1	0
MF	(England) Vic Rouse	24	0	1	0	25	0
MF	(England) George Stentiford	8	0	0	0	8	0
FW	(England) Len Armitage	3	0	0	0	3	0
FW	(England) Jimmy Broad	37	14	1	0	38	14
FW	(England) Tommy Broad	30	0	1	0	31	0
FW	(England) Harry Davies	31	9	1	0	32	9
FW	(England) Jack Eyres	19	7	0	0	19	7
FW	(England) Charles Kelly	9	1	0	0	9	1
FW	(Wales) Dai Nicholas	9	0	1	0	10	0
FW	(England) Bert Ralphs	12	0	0	0	12	0
FW	(England) Frank Richardson	6	2	0	0	6	2
FW	(Scotland) John Roxburgh	14	1	0	0	14	1
FW	(England) Harry Sellars	8	4	0	0	8	4
FW	(England) Andy Smith	3	0	0	0	3	0
FW	(England) Billy Tempest	29	2	1	0	30	2
