= Tommy Broad =

English footballer

Personal information
- Full name: Thomas Higginson Broad
- Date of birth: 31 July 1887
- Place of birth: Stalybridge, England
- Date of death: October qtr. 1966 (aged 79)
- Place of death: Barton-upon-Irwell, England
- Height: 5 ft 10 in (1.78 m)
- Position: Outside right

Youth career
- Redgate Albion
- Denton Wanderers
- Openshaw Lads Club

Senior career*
| Years | Team | Apps | (Gls) |
| 1905–1908 | West Bromwich Albion | 11 | (0) |
| 1908–1909 | Chesterfield | 48 | (5) |
| 1909–1912 | Oldham Athletic | 134 | (12) |
| 1912–1919 | Bristol City | 106 | (8) |
| 1919–1921 | Manchester City | 42 | (0) |
| 1921–1924 | Stoke | 83 | (4) |
| 1924–1925 | Southampton | 9 | (0) |
| 1925–1926 | Weymouth | | |
| 1926–???? | Rhyl | | |
| Total | | 433 | (29) |
- * Club domestic league appearances and goals

Thomas Higginson Broad (31 July 1887 – 1966) was an English footballer who played in the Football League for Bristol City, Chesterfield, Manchester City, Oldham Athletic, Southampton, Stoke and West Bromwich Albion. His brother Jimmy was also a footballer.

== Football career ==
Broad was born in Stalybridge and after playing youth football with various clubs, he had an unsuccessful trial with Manchester City in 1904. In September 1905, he signed his first professional contract with West Bromwich Albion where he made 14 league and cup appearances before joining Chesterfield in February 1908.

Broad remained at Saltergate until the end of the 1908–09 season, at the end of which the "Spireites" were relegated to the Third Division. Broad then returned to his native Lancashire, joining Oldham Athletic in May 1909. At the end of Broad's first season at Boundary Park, the "Latics" were promoted to the First Division as runners-up to Manchester City. After three years with Oldham, during which he made over 140 first-team appearances, Broad was on the move again, this time back to the Second Division with Bristol City.

Broad remained with the Ashton Gate club until after the First World War, making over 110 appearances, before again returning to Lancashire and the First Division, with Manchester City. Two years at Hyde Road were followed by three seasons at Stoke where Broad along with his brother Jimmy helped the "Potters" finish as Second Division runners-up in 1921–22, although this was followed by relegation the following season. After three years in the Potteries, where Broad made 89 first-team appearances, he moved to the South Coast to join Southampton.

Broad still holds the distinction of being the oldest player ever signed by the "Saints", being just three weeks short of his 37th birthday. At The Dell, he was used as cover for Bill Henderson and only had a run of three games in October, followed by six in April. In September 1925, Broad moved to Weymouth of the Western League, before playing out his career with Rhyl.

== Career statistics ==
Appearances and goals by club, season and competition
| Club | Season | League | | | FA Cup | | Total | |
| Club | Season | Division | Apps | Goals | Apps | Goals | Apps | Goals |
|---|---|---|---|---|---|---|---|---|
| West Bromwich Albion | 1906–07 | Second Division | 11 | 0 | 4 | 1 | 15 | 1 |
| West Bromwich Albion | Total | | 11 | 0 | 4 | 1 | 15 | 1 |
| Chesterfield | 1907–08 | Second Division | 10 | 2 | 0 | 0 | 10 | 2 |
| Chesterfield | 1908–09 | Second Division | 38 | 3 | 2 | 0 | 40 | 3 |
| Chesterfield | Total | | 48 | 5 | 2 | 0 | 50 | 5 |
| Oldham Athletic | 1909–10 | Second Division | 37 | 7 | 1 | 0 | 38 | 7 |
| Oldham Athletic | 1910–11 | First Division | 23 | 1 | 3 | 0 | 26 | 1 |
| Oldham Athletic | 1911–12 | First Division | 36 | 1 | 4 | 0 | 40 | 1 |
| Oldham Athletic | Total | | 96 | 9 | 8 | 0 | 104 | 9 |
| Bristol City | 1912–13 | Second Division | 37 | 3 | 1 | 0 | 38 | 3 |
| Bristol City | 1913–14 | Second Division | 38 | 3 | 2 | 0 | 40 | 3 |
| Bristol City | 1914–15 | Second Division | 31 | 2 | 2 | 0 | 33 | 2 |
| Bristol City | Total | | 106 | 8 | 5 | 0 | 111 | 8 |
| Manchester City | 1919–20 | First Division | 19 | 0 | 1 | 0 | 20 | 0 |
| Manchester City | 1920–21 | First Division | 23 | 0 | 1 | 0 | 24 | 0 |
| Manchester City | Total | | 42 | 0 | 2 | 0 | 44 | 0 |
| Stoke | 1921–22 | Second Division | 32 | 3 | 4 | 0 | 36 | 3 |
| Stoke | 1922–23 | First Division | 21 | 1 | 1 | 0 | 22 | 1 |
| Stoke | 1923–24 | Second Division | 30 | 0 | 1 | 0 | 31 | 0 |
| Stoke | Total | | 83 | 4 | 6 | 0 | 89 | 4 |
| Southampton | 1924–25 | Second Division | 9 | 0 | 0 | 0 | 9 | 0 |
| Southampton | Total | | 9 | 0 | 0 | 0 | 9 | 0 |
| Career total | | | 395 | 26 | 27 | 1 | 422 | 27 |

== Honours ==
Oldham Athletic

- Football League Second Division runners-up: 1909–10

Stoke

- Football League Second Division runners-up: 1921–22
