= Leslie Scott (footballer) =

English footballer

Personal information
- Full name: Leslie Scott
- Date of birth: 1895
- Place of birth: Fulwell, Sunderland, England
- Date of death: 1973 (aged 78)
- Height: 5 ft 9 1/2 in (1.77 m)
- Position: Goalkeeper

Senior career*
Years	Team	Apps	(Gls)
1912	Fulwell		
1913–1921	Sunderland	91	(0)
1922–1922	Stoke	20	(0)
1923–1924	Preston North End	2	(0)
1924	Sunderland Corporation		
Total		113	(0)
- * Club domestic league appearances and goals

Leslie Scott (1895–1973) was an English footballer who played in the Football League for Preston North End, Sunderland and Stoke.

== Career ==
Scott began playing football with his local amateur team in Fulwell before he was spotted by Sunderland in 1913. He made his debut in 1914 and established himself as the "Black Cats" number one during the 1914–15 season. He remained with Sunderland after World War I and after three more seasons with the club he left for newly promoted Stoke in 1922. He did not have the desired impact at Stoke as the team struggled in the First Division and were relegated, Scott playing 20 matches during the 1922–23 season before he was released to Preston North End. After a short spell in Preston he returned to his home town of Sunderland and worked for the Sunderland Corporation Tramways.

== Career statistics ==
Appearances and goals by club, season and competition
Club	Season	League			FA Cup		Total	
Club	Season	Division	Apps	Goals	Apps	Goals	Apps	Goals
Sunderland	1913–14	First Division	5	0	0	0	5	0
Sunderland	1914–15	First Division	37	0	1	0	38	0
Sunderland	1919–20	First Division	18	0	3	0	21	0
Sunderland	1920–21	First Division	16	0	0	0	16	0
Sunderland	1921–22	First Division	15	0	0	0	15	0
Sunderland	Total		91	0	4	0	95	0
Stoke	1922–23	First Division	20	0	0	0	20	0
Preston North End	1923–24	First Division	2	0	0	0	2	0
Career total			113	0	4	0	117	0
