= 1912 FA Cup final =

1912 FA Cup Final
- Event: 1911–12 FA Cup
Barnsley	West Bromwich Albion
- Barnsley won after a replay

Final
Barnsley	West Bromwich Albion
0	0
- Date: 20 April 1912
- Venue: Crystal Palace, London
- Referee: J.R. Schumacher
- Attendance: 54,434

Replay
Barnsley	West Bromwich Albion
1	0
- After extra time
- Date: 24 April 1912
- Venue: Bramall Lane, Sheffield
- Referee: J.R. Schumacher
- Attendance: 38,555

The 1912 FA Cup final was the 41st FA Cup final. It was contested by Barnsley and West Bromwich Albion. It took two matches to determine a winner. The first took place at Crystal Palace on 20 April 1912 and the second on 24 April at Bramall Lane. Barnsley scored the winning and only goal in the final minute of extra time (30 minutes) of the replay. West Bromwich Albion were naturally disappointed to have lost but they could console themselves in the fact that they were the better team on the day, at times running through their opponents in brilliant fashion. The "Throstles" reputation was enhanced by the display over the two ties even though they lost the match. The "Tykes" defended impeccably throughout, and Tufnell scored the winning goal.

== Road to the Final ==
=== Barnsley ===
Home teams listed first. Round 1: Birmingham 0–0 Barnsley

Replay: Barnsley 3–1 Birmingham

Lillycrop 2, TBC

Round 2: Barnsley 1–0 Leicester Fosse

Lillycrop

Round 3: Bolton Wanderers 1–2 Barnsley

Lillycrop, Leavey

Round 4: Barnsley 0–0 Bradford City

Replay: Bradford City 0–0 Barnsley

Replay: Barnsley 0–0 Bradford City

Replay: Barnsley 3–2 Bradford City

Lillycrop 2, Travers (aet)
(at Bramall Lane)

Semi-final: Barnsley 0–0 Swindon Town

(at Stamford Bridge)

Replay: Barnsley 1–0 Swindon Town

Bratley
(at Meadow Lane Nottingham)

=== West Bromwich Albion ===
Home teams listed first. Round 1: West Bromwich Albion 3–0 Tottenham Hotspur

Round 2: Leeds City 0–1 West Bromwich Albion

Round 3: Sunderland 1–2 West Bromwich Albion

Round 4: West Bromwich Albion 3–1 Fulham

Semi-final: Blackburn 0–0 West Bromwich Albion

(at Anfield)

Replay: Blackburn 0–1 West Bromwich Albion

(at Hillsborough)

== Match programme ==
The programme showed that both teams played a 2–3–5 formation.

== Match summary ==
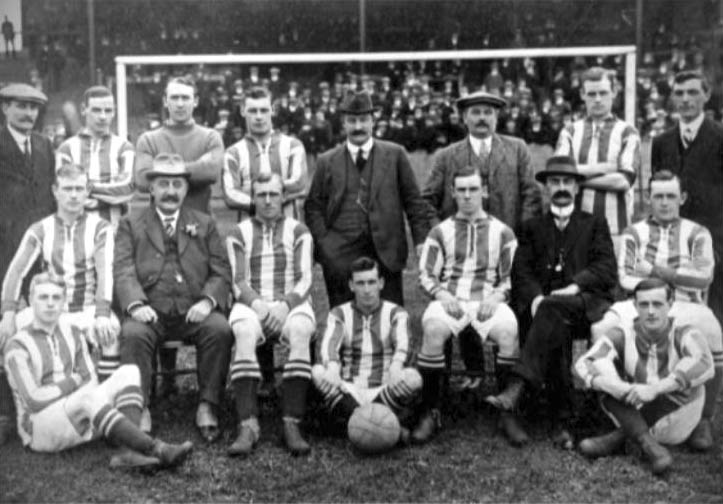
The West Bromwich Albion team that played in the 1912 FA Cup Final.

The crowd that assembled to watch the 1912 FA Cup final was some 15–20,000 smaller than previous years but they still filled the ground and there was little spare space. Some spectators took to the trees around the ground and a group of WBA supporters tried to launch a blue and white striped hot air balloon, but it burned before it left the ground. This failed stunt became a metaphor for a game that also failed to rise to meet the spectators' expectations.

Barnsley did not play an exciting game of football; relying on their half backs to run alongside the WBA forwards making the WBA game of pass and return between their forwards and half backs too dangerous. Barnsley then tried to score on the break. But the WBA backs, led by Pennington, were able to contain the threat. This led to a stalemate, with WBA unable to play their normal game and Barnsley unable to push their advantage.

WBA had a couple of chances early in the first half when Cooper, the Barnsley goalkeeper, fumbled a shot from Baddeley but he did not have any support. Cooper was again tested when Jephcott centred the ball several times but again WBA did not press home the advantage. Barnsley had similar problems exploiting an advantage when Tufnell and Bartrop got through unmarked on the right wing. The Manchester Guardian felt that WBA had the better run of play in the first half but by the end of the second half felt the teams were evenly matched.

There were some exciting moments towards the end. The first came when Pearson, the WBA goalkeeper mishandled a centring pass from Moore and Barnsley managed two shots the first rebounding from a WBA player, the second from the woodwork. Moments from the end of the match Buck a WBA player had his best chance but hit a goal post.

The third drawn Cup final in as many years drew aggravated comments from the departing crowds.

The Manchester Guardian felt the best players were the backs and half backs on each side, singling out Pennington and Buck on the WBA side for praise and Downs along with Glendinning for Barnsley. They also felt that Jephcott, the WBA wing, had had a good match, with several good centring passes.

== Match details ==
20 April 1912
15:00 BST

Barnsley	0–0	West Bromwich Albion

Crystal Palace
Attendance: 54,434
Referee: J.R. Schumacher

Barnsley	West Bromwich Albion

GK	Jack Cooper
FB	Dickie Downs
FB	Archie Taylor (c)
HB	Bob Glendenning
CH	Philip Bratley
HB	George Utley
OF	Wilfred Bartrop
IF	Harry Tufnell
CF	George Lillycrop
IF	George Travers
OF	Jimmy Moore
Manager:
Arthur Fairclough

GK	Hubert Pearson
FB	Arthur Cook
FB	Jesse Pennington (c)
HB	George Baddeley
CH	Fred Buck
HB	Bobby McNeal
OF	Claude Jephcott
IF	Harry Wright
CF	Bob Pailor
IF	Sid Bowser
OF	Ben Shearman
Secretary-manager:
Fred Everiss

== Replay summary ==
Albion's run in the cup, combined with several postponements from the early part of the season, meant that they were forced to play seven games in ten days at the end of the campaign. This included an away match at Everton on 22 April, in between the final and the replay. Albion lost the match 3–0 with a reserve side and were fined £150 by the Football League for fielding a weakened team, although nine of the eleven players had previously played in the league for the first team.

To the frustration of the supporters the play during the replay was not much better than the original match. WBA's tactics had improved and they had the better of the play through most of the match, but they failed to take their chances when they were presented. Pailor and Shearman missed a centring pass provided by Jephcott. Later in the second half Pailor almost got a shot past Cooper, who failed to control the ball, Glendinning saved the situation for Barnsley by kicking the ball into touch. Barnsley also tested the WBA goal, mainly Bartrop on the right wing. One of his shots in the first half had to be cleared off the line by Baddeley after Pearson fumbled the save.

As the game ran into extra time, the Manchester Guardian commented that "given the sunny and hot conditions the energy of the players was impressive", and the pace of the game picked up. Apart from a brief attack on their goal by Travers and Moore the play was all with WBA until the last two minutes of extra time. Glendinning dribbled the ball out of a ruck in the Barnsley half and passed the ball to Tufnell, who was on the halfway line. Pennington, who had had an otherwise flawless game was bypassed as Tufnell kicked the ball past Pennington's right and then ran around his left side. Cook and Buck seeing the danger ran back, but they were too late. Within a few seconds Tufnell was in front of the goal. Pearson came off his line to narrow the angle and stamped his feet as he waited for the shot. Despite the pressure on him, Tufnell's shot was perfect; fast, low and out of Pearson's reach, it found the corner of the net.

The Barnsley players hugged and kissed Tufnell as they celebrated his goal knowing that they could hold on for the final two minutes. The gate receipts for the replay were £2615 and a collection was held for the Titanic Disaster Fund which received a total of £49 1s 2d. The players travelled by motor back to Barnsley and were cheered through the streets of Sheffield as they held the cup to show the crowd. They arrived in Barnsley in the early evening to a great welcome.

In discussing the players, the Manchester Guardian praised the Barnsley backs of Taylor and Downs, though Pennington for WBA also played well. Of the half backs, Glendinning of Barnsley and McNeal from WBA were judged to be the best on the day. When considering the WBA forwards, Shearman, Bowser and Jephcot were praised, but Pailor in the centre had not made the best of the supply of crosses. Of the Barnsley forwards, Bartrop and Travers were the best.

The victorious Barnsley team presented the match ball to Tiverton Preedy, the clergyman who had founded the club. It was displayed in his study until his death in 1928, whereupon it was returned to the club.

== Replay details ==
24 April 1912
15:00 BST

Barnsley	1–0 (a.e.t.)	West Bromwich Albion
Tufnell 118'

Bramall Lane
Attendance: 38,555
Referee: J.R. Schumacher

Barnsley	West Bromwich Albion

GK	Jack Cooper
FB	Dickie Downs
FB	Archie Taylor (c)
HB	Bob Glendenning
CH	Philip Bratley
HB	George Utley
OF	Wilfred Bartrop
IF	Harry Tufnell
CF	George Lillycrop
IF	George Travers
OF	Jimmy Moore
Manager:
Arthur Fairclough

GK	Hubert Pearson
FB	Arthur Cook
FB	Jesse Pennington (c)
HB	George Baddeley
CH	Fred Buck
HB	Bobby McNeal
OF	Claude Jephcott
IF	Harry Wright
CF	Bob Pailor
IF	Sid Bowser
OF	Ben Shearman
Secretary-manager:
Fred Everiss

Match and replay rules

- 90 minutes.
- Replay if necessary.
- 30 minutes of extra-time if scores still level.
- No substitutes.
