= Philip Bratley =

English footballer

Phil Bratley
Personal information
- Full name: Philip Wright Bratley
- Date of birth: 26 December 1880
- Place of birth: Rawmarsh, England
- Date of death: June 1959 (aged 78)
- Place of death: Rotherham, England
- Height: 5 ft 10 1/2 in (1.79 m)
- Position: Centre half

Senior career*
Years	Team	Apps	(Gls)
–1902	Rawmarsh		
1902	Doncaster Rovers	3	(0)
1902–	Rotherham Town		
–1910	Rotherham County		
1910–1914	Barnsley	104	(7)
1914–1915	Liverpool	13	(0)
1919–1921	Rotherham County	10	(0)
- Worksop
- * Club domestic league appearances and goals

Philip Wright Bratley (26 December 1880 – June 1959) was a footballer who played for Rawmarsh, Doncaster Rovers, Barnsley, Liverpool, Rotherham Town, Rotherham County and Worksop. He played at centre half.

== Club career ==
Phil Bratley started his footballing career with his local amateur side Rawmarsh before transferring to Football League Second Division side Doncaster Rovers in 1902 where he played three games between 27 September and 11 October. He then moved closer to home when he joined Rotherham Town before moving on to the more successful Rotherham County. In 1910 he joined Barnsley as a replacement for Tommy Boyle who had been sold to Burnley. He scored Barnsley's winning goal in their semi-final replay with Swindon and won a FA Cup winners medal in the final when Barnsley beat West Bromwich Albion in a replay after the first match ended goalless. Bratley almost scored in the replay; Barnsley had forced a corner and Bratley headed the ball towards the line, only a jumping save at the edge of the goal by Pearson the WBA goalkeeper prevented a goal.

He left Barnsley in late 1914 and transferred to Liverpool. He played a total of 13 games before leaving during the First World War. After the war he played again for Rotherham County and Worksop. He died in June 1959.

== Personal life ==
In December 1915, during the First World War, Bratley attested under the Derby Scheme and was placed in the Army Reserve. In April 1918, he was mobilised into the Coldstream Guards, but did not see combat before his demobilisation in January 1919.

== Honours ==
Barnsley

- FA Cup: 1911–12
