= Archie Taylor (footballer, born 1879) =

Scottish footballer

Personal information
- Full name: Archibald Taylor
- Date of birth: 28 November 1879
- Place of birth: Dundee, Scotland
- Date of death: 14 March 1966 (aged 86)
- Place of death: Craignish, Scotland
- Height: 5 ft 9 1/2 in (1.77 m)
- Position: Full back

Senior career*
Years	Team	Apps	(Gls)
1900–1904	Dundee	2	(0)
1902–1903	→ Raith Rovers (loan)	21	(0)
1904–1905	Bolton Wanderers	3	(0)
1905–1906	Bristol Rovers	9	(0)
1906–1907	Brentford	28	(0)
1907–1909	West Ham United	60	(0)
1909–1910	Falkirk	30	(2)
1910–1911	Huddersfield Town	29	(0)
1911–1913	Barnsley	57	(0)
1913–1914	York City		
- * Club domestic league appearances and goals

Archibald Taylor (28 November 1879 – 14 March 1966) was a Scottish professional footballer who played as a full back in England and Scotland for Dundee, Falkirk, West Ham United, Huddersfield Town and Barnsley.

== Career ==
Taylor captained the Barnsley team which won the FA Cup in 1912, by beating West Bromwich Albion in a replay, after the first match ended goalless. The Manchester Guardian, when reporting on the first match noted that he kept Albion outside forward Jephcott in check. In the replay his play was again praised. Earlier in his career, he won the FA Cup with Bolton Wanderers in 1904. After his retirement, he served Dundee as assistant trainer.

== Career statistics ==
Appearances and goals by club, season and competition
Club	Season	League			National cup (Note: Includes Scottish Cup, FA Cup)		Total	
Club	Season	Division	Apps	Goals	Apps	Goals	Apps	Goals
Dundee	1900–01	Scottish League First Division	2	0	0	0	2	0
Raith Rovers (loan)	1902–03	Scottish League Second Division	21	0	1	0	22	0
Bolton Wanderers	1904–05	Second Division	3	0	3	0	3	0
Brentford	1906–07	Southern League First Division	28	0	0	0	28	0
West Ham United	1907–08	Southern League First Division	25	0	1	0	26	0
West Ham United	1908–09	Southern League First Division	35	0	6	0	41	0
West Ham United	Total		60	0	7	0	67	0
Falkirk	1909–10	Scottish League First Division	30	0	2	0	32	0
Huddersfield Town	1910–11	Second Division	29	0	5	0	34	0
Career total			173	0	18	0	191	0

== Honours ==
Bolton Wanderers

- FA Cup: 1903–04

Barnsley

- FA Cup: 1911–12
