= Burnopfield =

Coordinates: 54°54′25″N 1°44′10″W

- Village
- Location within County Durham
- Population: 4,533
- OS grid reference: NZ180572
- Unitary authority: County Durham
- Ceremonial county: County Durham
- Region: North East
- Country: England
- Sovereign state: United Kingdom
- Post town: NEWCASTLE UPON TYNE
- Postcode district: NE16
- Dialling code: 01207
- Police: Durham
- Fire: County Durham and Darlington
- Ambulance: North East
- UK Parliament: Blaydon and Consett

Burnopfield is a village in County Durham, in England. It is situated north of Stanley and Annfield Plain, close to the River Derwent and is 564 feet (172 metres) above sea level. There are around 4,553 inhabitants in Burnopfield. It is located seven miles (eleven kilometres) from Newcastle upon Tyne and 15 miles (24 kilometres) from Durham.

== Etymology ==
The name Burnopfield probably comes from the Old English meaning "field by the valley stream", although local legend says that the village got its name after an attempted Scottish invasion of England was foiled by literally burning up the fields to stop the advancing armies. In the 19th century, Burnopfield was usually referred to as the Leap, or in local dialect, as the Loup, after the area of Burnopfield named Bryan's Leap.

== History ==
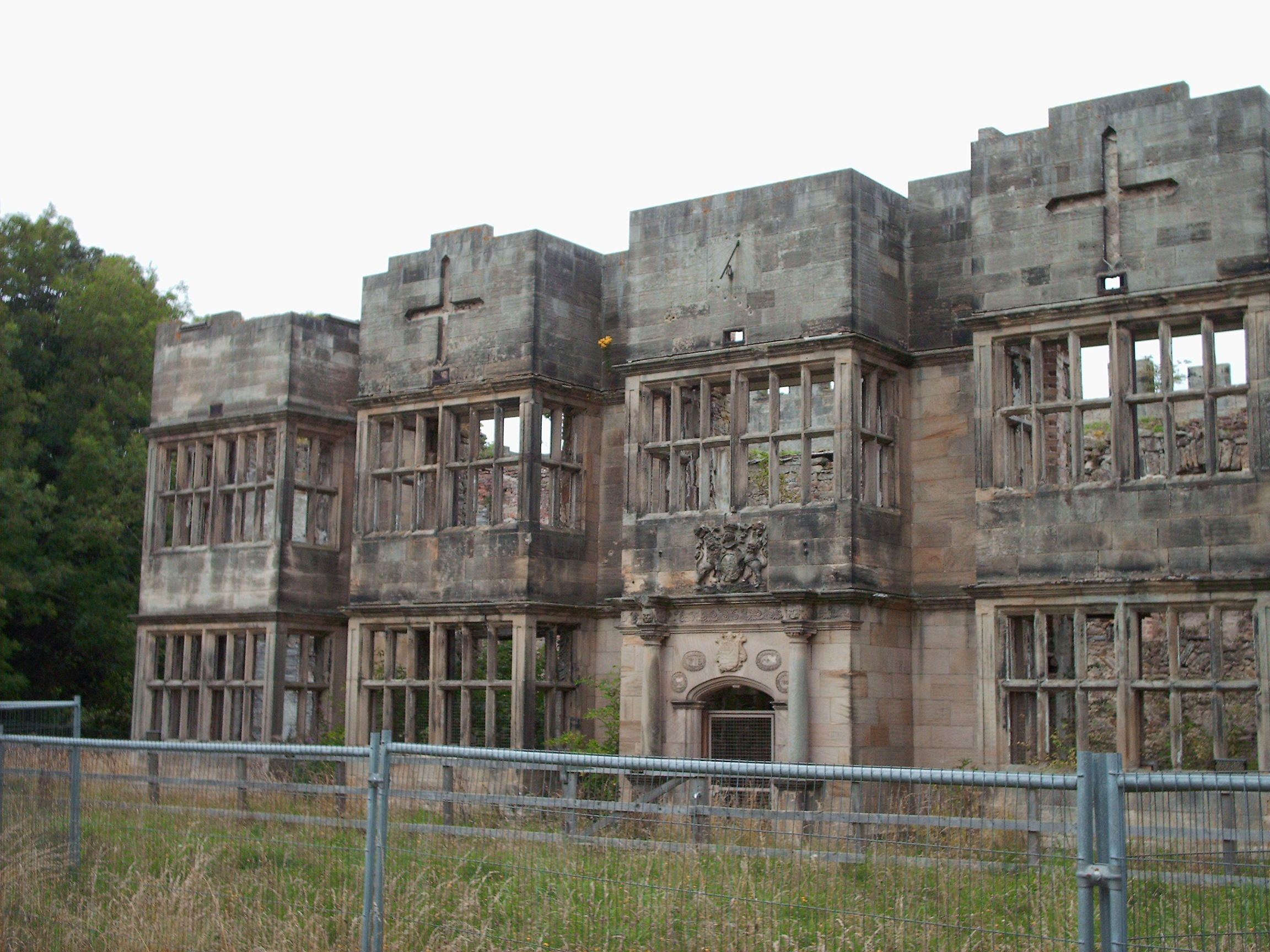
The shell of Gibside Hall

Burnopfield was the site of a leper hospital, High Friarside Hospice, which was founded in 1312, but was demolished in approximately 1450. The remains of the original chapel can still be seen today. Other historical buildings in Burnopfield include Burnopfield Hall, which was constructed in 1720 by the Newton family, a wealthy mine-owning family, Leap Mill Farm, a classic example of an 18th-century mill with a working water wheel, and the Gibside estate, which is located between Burnopfield and Rowlands Gill.

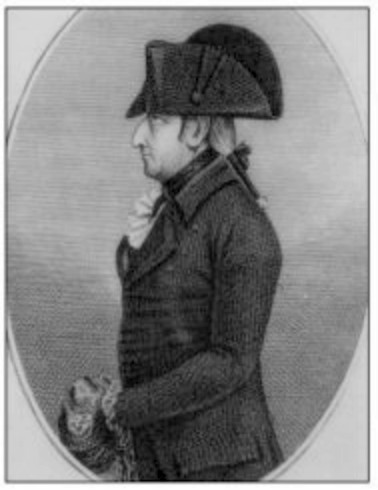
Andrew Robinson Stoney

The families of Burnopfield Hall and Gibside are linked by the scandalous adventurer Andrew Robinson Stoney: in the late 1760s, Hannah Newton, daughter and heiress to the Newton family fortune, married Stoney, an Irish Lieutenant and adventurer who was stationed in Newcastle. They went to live at Colepike Hall in Lanchester, where his ill-treatment of her became a local scandal, and within a few years she died. In control of her £20,000 fortune, he set off for London, where he met the widowed Countess of Strathmore, who owned the Gibside estate. Stoney eventually tricked her into marriage, and having to adopt her family name of Bowes, became the notorious Stoney Bowes. Her subsequent miserable life with him became one of the biggest scandals of the period. His story was fictionalised by William Makepeace Thackeray in The Luck of Barry Lyndon. Stanley Kubrick later adapted the novel into the 1975 film Barry Lyndon. The family at Gibside Hall eventually became the Bowes-Lyon family, one member of the family being Queen Elizabeth The Queen Mother. The hall itself is now owned by the National Trust. In 1815, J. M. W. Turner produced several landscapes of Gibside Hall, which are on display in the Tate Britain.

In 1746, John Wesley visited the village, and preached in a garden in Sheep Hill, an area within Burnopfield. He made several more visits, resulting in the formation of a Methodist Society, and in 1775 the first chapel was built, and rebuilt in 1880. By this time other two places of worship had been built: in 1870, a second Methodist chapel, and in 1873, the Anglican church of Saint James was constructed in 1873 at the Leazes end of the village. Until the church was built, Burnopfield had been a section of the Tanfield and District Anglican Parish.

=== Coal mining ===
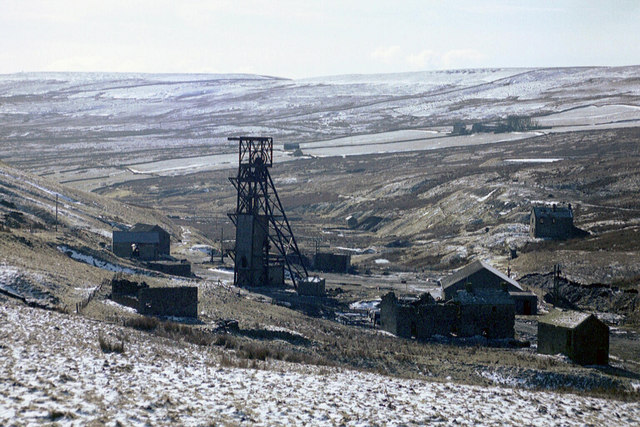
Durham mine

Coal mining in County Durham began in the 1600s, and narrow waggonways were laid from the pits and Burnopfield was found to be an ideal place for the waggonways from the Pontop and Tanfield Moor areas to pass through and then continue down the hill to cross the Derwent, and on to the River Tyne for the coal to be shipped. Although surrounded by colliery villages like Lintz, Hobson, High Friarside and Marley Hill, it never had a serious mine of its own. Gradually it became largely occupied by people who worked in the nearby mining villages. With the building of a Co-operative Society shop in 1889, it also became a shopping centre for the miners and their families from the neighbouring colliery villages.

With the decline of the British mining industry, the number of miners in the village drastically decreased, and they worked in the coastal pits. Industrial estates, factories, offices and shops now provide the work for residents of Burnopfield. During the latter part of the 20th century, the village changed from its old waggonway days; new council and private estates have been built and Burnopfield has extended both to the east and the west absorbing much of the adjoining areas into its postal district.

=== Cricket ===
Cricket has long been a popular sport in the village – it has been played at two small cricket grounds. One is to be found in Lintz, near Burnopfield, since 1905, and the other once was located off Lilac Crescent. Both grounds were built upon land given to the clubs by the National Coal Board. In 2013, a planning report concluded that

Burnopfield Cricket Club is no longer able to meet the standards necessary for the level at which the club plays and, due to the site’s physical constraints, there is no scope to address the deficiencies of its pitch and facilities nor attract any grant funding from cricket’s governing body or Sport England.

As such, the ground was sold to housing developers and a brand new ground and club house was constructed 450m to the south east. The Burnopfield Club produced two Test cricketers for England, both of whom played before Durham County Cricket Club took part in the county championship; Jim McConnon, who played for Glamorgan, and Colin Milburn, the "Burnopfield Basher", who played for Northamptonshire. When Milburn died in 1990, his funeral was the largest ever seen in Burnopfield, and was attended by many notable cricketing figures including future Durham player Ian Botham.

== Lintz ==
Lintz is a small village immediately to the south-west of Burnopfield. The famous court case, Miller v Jackson, arose from cricket played by Lintz Cricket Club in the village.

== Notable residents ==
- Eddie Chapman (1914–1997), criminal and double agent for Nazi Germany and the UK.
- Jim McConnon (1922–2003), cricketer, played two Tests for England
- Colin Milburn (1941–1990), cricketer, played nine Tests for England
- John Snow (1813–1858), physician and proponent of anaesthesia and medical hygiene
- Dare Wilson (1919–2014), SAS officer who introduced attack helicopters to the British military

== Transport ==
The village is served by the Go North East bus service. The current services include the 6 (Lanchester to Newcastle), the X71 (Consett to Newcastle) and after 6pm, the X72 (Stanley to Newcastle) Previous bus services included the M6, M7, M8, 40, 714, 43, X12, the X70 and the 770. The R5, mostly operated by Gateshead Central Taxis, runs hourly during the day Mon. to Sat. from St James Church to Rowlands Gill and Highfield.
