= 1918–19 Stoke F.C. season =

Stoke
1918–19 season
- Chairman: Mr E.Reynish
- Manager: Joe Schofield
- Stadium: Victoria Ground
- Lancashire Section Primary Competition: 2nd
- Lancashire Section Secondary Competition Group C: 2nd
- Top goalscorer: Bob Whittingham (23)
- Highest home attendance: 24,000 vs Liverpool (15 February 1919)
- Lowest home attendance: 3,000 vs Various teams
Home colours

The 1918–19 season was Stoke's fourth season in the non-competitive War League.

With the start of World War I, all Football League football was cancelled. In its place were formed War Leagues, based on geographical lines rather than based on previous league placement. Stoke contested the Lancashire Section in the Principal Tournament, and the Lancashire Section Secondary Competition Group C. However, none of these were considered to be competitive football, and thus their records are not recognised by the Football League.

== Season review ==
The final war-time season of 1918–19 saw Stoke take the runners-up spot behind Everton. Stoke were again in impressive goal scoring form among those victories were those of 8–1 over Port Vale, 7–0 v Blackburn Rovers and 7–1 v Bolton Wanderers. Bob Whittingham top scored again with 23 goals taking his war-time total for Stoke to 86. With the war now over it was announced that the Football League would return for the 1919–20 season and Stoke were due to enter the Second Division.

== Final league table ==
=== Lancashire Section Primary Competition ===
Pos	Team	Pld	W	D	L	GF	GA	GAv	Pts
1	Everton	30	27	2	1	108	26	4.154	56
2	Stoke	30	20	3	7	84	36	2.333	43
3	Liverpool	30	19	4	7	82	33	2.485	42
4	Bolton Wanderers	30	15	6	9	58	58	1.000	36
5	Manchester City	30	15	3	12	57	36	1.583	33
6	Southport Vulcan	30	15	3	12	49	53	0.925	33
7	Preston North End	30	12	6	12	41	51	0.804	30
8	Stockport County	30	11	7	12	48	52	0.923	29
9	Manchester United	30	11	5	14	51	50	1.020	27
10	Rochdale	30	11	5	14	56	61	0.918	27
11	Blackpool	30	10	5	15	45	61	0.738	25
12	Port Vale	30	10	4	16	39	77	0.506	24
13	Burnley	30	10	3	17	54	76	0.711	23
14	Bury	30	7	6	17	27	58	0.466	20
15	Oldham Athletic	30	7	4	19	39	62	0.629	18
16	Blackburn Rovers	30	5	4	21	35	83	0.422	14

=== Lancashire Section Secondary Competition Group C ===
Pos	Team	Pld	W	D	L	GF	GA	GAv	Pts
1	Manchester City	6	5	1	0	14	4	3.500	11
2	Stoke	6	2	2	2	9	10	0.900	6
3	Manchester United	6	2	0	4	9	14	0.643	4
4	Port Vale	6	1	1	4	9	13	0.692	3

== Results ==
Stoke's score comes first

=== Legend ===
Win	Draw	Loss

=== Lancashire Section Primary Competition ===
Match	Date	Opponent	Venue	Result	Attendance	Scorers
1	7 September 1918	Manchester City	H	3–0	8,000	P. Jones (2), Watkin
2	14 September 1918	Manchester City	A	2–0	10,000	Turner, Lockett
3	21 September 1918	Oldham Athletic	H	1–0	3,000	Harrison
4	28 September 1918	Oldham Athletic	A	1–3	3,000	Turner
5	5 October 1918	Port Vale	H	3–2	14,000	Turner, Bowser, McGregor
6	12 October 1918	Port Vale	A	8–1	13,000	Bowser, Lockett (2), Whittingham (4), Herbert
7	19 October 1918	Blackburn Rovers	H	7–0	8,000	Lockett (3), Turner (2), Herbert, Harrison
8	26 October 1918	Blackburn Rovers	A	6–0	700	Harrison, Bowser, Herbert (3), Parker
9	2 November 1918	Everton	A	1–5	14,000	Bowser
10	9 November 1918	Everton	H	0–2	12,000	
11	16 November 1918	Rochdale	A	2–3	4,000	Bowser, Jones
12	23 November 1918	Rochdale	H	1–1	12,000	Herbert
13	30 November 1918	Preston North End	A	1–0	12,000	Brown
14	7 December 1918	Preston North End	H	5–0	12,000	Brown (2), Harrison, Whittingham (2)
15	14 December 1918	Bolton Wanderers	A	1–1	13,000	Whittingham
16	21 December 1918	Bolton Wanderers	H	7–1	12,000	Whittingham (3), Brown (3), Parker
17	28 December 1918	Bury	A	2–0	4,000	Whittingham, Turner
18	4 January 1919	Bury	H	3–1	12,000	Whittingham (2), Wootton
19	11 January 1919	Blackpool	A	6–1	6,000	Whittingham (2), Brown (2), Harrison, Herbert
20	18 January 1919	Blackpool	H	2–1	10,000	Whittingham, Brown
21	25 January 1919	Stockport County	A	2–1	10,000	Whittingham, Brown
22	1 February 1919	Stockport County	H	1–0	10,000	Whittingham
23	8 February 1919	Liverpool	A	1–1	23,000	Brown
24	15 February 1919	Liverpool	H	3–1	24,000	Whittingham (2), Harrison
25	22 February 1919	Southport Vulcan	H	0–2	8,000	
26	1 March 1919	Southport Vulcan	A	5–3	4,000	Herbert (3), Whittingham (2)
27	8 March 1919	Manchester United	H	1–2	10,000	Whittingham
28	15 March 1919	Manchester United	A	1–3	30,000	Wootton
29	22 March 1919	Burnley	A	2–1	15,000	Martin (2)
30	29 March 1919	Burnley	H	2–1	8,000	Whittingham, Herbert

=== Lancashire Section Secondary Competition Group C ===
Match	Date	Opponent	Venue	Result	Attendance	Scorers
1	5 April 1919	Manchester City	A	0–1	25,000	
2	12 April 1919	Manchester City	H	1–1	14,000	Phillips
3	19 April 1919	Manchester United	A	1–0	28,000	Phillips
4	21 April 1919	Port Vale	H	2–2	28,000	Phillips, Wootton
5	26 April 1919	Manchester United	H	4–2	28,000	Jones, Martin (3)
6	28 April 1919	Port Vale	A	1–4	28,000	Herbert

== Squad statistics ==
Pos.	Name	Matches	
Pos.	Name	Apps	Goals
GK	(England) Tom Kay	2	0
GK	(England) A. Morris	6	0
GK	(England) Teddy Peers	28	0
DF	(England) Alf Bishop	1	0
DF	(England) Arthur Cook	5	0
DF	(England) J. Emery	4	0
DF	(England) George Garratly	10	0
DF	(England) Jack Maddock	14	0
DF	(England) Alec Milne	1	0
DF	(England) Bertie Smart	1	0
DF	(England) George Smart	7	0
DF	(England) Billy Twemlow	26	0
DF	(England) Tommy Weston	1	0
DF	(England) Fred Wilkinson	1	0
DF	(England) Harry Wootton	3	0
MF	(England) Bill Charnley	1	0
MF	(England) George Clarke	6	0
MF	(Wales) Joe Jones	28	2
MF	(England) Charlie Parker	22	2
MF	(England) Fred Parker	5	0
MF	(England) Dick Smith	28	0
MF	(England) H. Sweetmore	1	0
FW	(England) R. Bowers	2	0
FW	(England) Sid Bowser	10	5
FW	(England) Tommy Bowyer	3	0
FW	(England) David Boxley	2	0
FW	(Scotland) David Brown	10	12
FW	(England) A. Ellis	1	0
FW	(England) P. Flaherty	1	0
FW	(England) Fred Groves	2	0
FW	(England) Harry Hampton	8	3
FW	(England) Billy Harrison	28	7
FW	(England) Billy Herbert	27	12
FW	(England) L. Jones	2	0
FW	(England) P. Jones	1	2
FW	(England) Aaron Lockett	12	6
FW	(England) George Limer	1	0
FW	(Scotland) G. McGregor	5	1
FW	(England) James Martin	7	5
FW	(England) Wilf Phillips	5	3
FW	(England) Billy Tempest	9	0
FW	(England) S. Timms	1	0
FW	(England) Eli Turner	15	6
FW	(England) Arthur Watkin	2	1
FW	(England) G. Whipp	2	0
FW	(England) Bob Whittingham	17	23
FW	(England) James Wootton	23	3
