= Jack Cooper (English footballer) =

English footballer

Personal information
- Full name: John Denman Cooper
- Date of birth: 25 February 1887
- Place of birth: Nottingham, England
- Date of death: 1952 (aged 64–65)
- Height: 5 ft 10 1/2 in (1.79 m)
- Position: Goalkeeper

Youth career
- Sutton Town

Senior career*
Years	Team	Apps	(Gls)
1908–1920	Barnsley	172	(0)
1920–1922	Newport County	81	(0)
- * Club domestic league appearances and goals

John Denman Cooper (25 February 1889 — 1952) was a footballer who played for Barnsley and Newport County. He was a goalkeeper.

== Club career ==
Cooper was a member of the Barnsley side who won the FA Cup in 1912 beating West Bromwich Albion in the replay after the first match ended goalless. He fumbled a save in the first fifteen minutes of the first match and was saved from embarrassment by a lack of WBA forwards. In the replay he made an important save, diving onto his side, to save a quick shot from Bob Pailor, the WBA centre forward, though the ball was finally cleared by Bob Glendinning.

In 1920, Cooper signed for Newport County. On 16 October 1920, Cooper was punched to the ground after confronting Millwall supporters throwing missiles at him. Millwall's ground, The Den, was closed for two weeks as a result.

== Honours ==
Barnsley

- FA Cup: winners 1912
