= Freney (surname) =

Freney is a surname. Notable people with the surname include:

- Jacqueline Freney (born 1992), Australian Paralympic swimmer
- James Freney (1719–1788), Irish highwayman
- Mick Freney (born 1948), Australian rugby union international
- William Freney (fl. late 1200s), English Roman Catholic archbishop
- Zoe Freney, Australian artist
- Michael Freney (born 1961),Australian Swimming Team Coach
