= Thomas Forman =

Thomas or Tom Forman may refer to:

- Thomas Marsh Forman (1809–1875), American Confederate politician
- Tom Forman (footballer) (1879 – after 1910), British footballer
- Thomas Forman (priest) (1885–1965), Archdeacon of Lindisfarne
- Thomas Forman (reformer) (died 1528), early English reformer
- Thomas Seaton Forman (1791–1850), British Conservative politician
- Tom Forman (actor) (1893–1926), American film actor, writer and producer
- Tom Forman (cartoonist) (1936–1996), American comic strip cartoonist
- Tom Forman (producer) (fl. 2002), television producer

== See also ==
- Tom Foreman (born 1959), broadcast journalist
