= 1915–16 Huddersfield Town A.F.C. season =

Huddersfield Town
1915–16 season
- Chairman: William Hardcastle
- Manager: Arthur Fairclough
- Stadium: Leeds Road
- Wartime League Midland Section Sudsibiary Comepition North Division: 3rd 3rd
- Top goalscorer: League: All: Thomas Elliott (13)
- Highest home attendance: 8,000 vs Sheffield Wednesday (29 January 1916)
- Lowest home attendance: 500 vs Leicester Fosse (11 December 1915)
- Biggest win: 5–0 vs Lincoln City (1 January 1916)
- Biggest defeat: 1–5 vs Sheffield United (18 December 1915)

Huddersfield Town's 1915–16 campaign saw Town play in the wartime football league, following the outbreak of World War I. Town played in the Midland League and finished in 3rd place, as well as 3rd place in the Subsidiary Competition North Division.

== Results ==
=== Midland Division ===
Date	Opponents	Home/Away	Result F–A	Scorers	Attendance
4 September 1915	Barnsley	H	2–1	Islip, Cooper (og)	3,500
11 September 1915	Leicester Fosse	A	0–3		3,000
18 September 1915	Sheffield United	H	2–2	Elliott (2, 1 pen)	3,500
2 October 1915	Lincoln City	A	0–3		2,000
9 October 1915	Grimsby Town	H	4–1	Linley, Mann, J. Baker (pen), Layton	3,000
16 October 1915	Notts County	A	1–1	James	5,500
23 October 1915	Derby County	H	4–1	Smith (2), J. Baker, Slade	3,000
30 October 1915	Sheffield Wednesday	A	1–2	Elliott	4,500
6 November 1915	Bradford Park Avenue	H	2–1	Elliott, Jee	3,000
13 November 1915	Leeds City	A	0–0		4,000
20 November 1915	Hull City	H	1–0	Layton	2,000
27 November 1915	Nottingham Forest	A	0–2		3,000
4 December 1915	Barnsley	A	1–2	Rippon	500
11 December 1915	Leicester Fosse	H	2–1	Elliott (2)	500
18 December 1915	Sheffield United	A	1–5	Watson	5,000
25 December 1915	Bradford City	H	0–0		6,500
27 December 1915	Bradford City	A	0–1		8,000
1 January 1916	Lincoln City	H	5–0	Mann, Elliott, Best, J. Baker, G. Barrell (og)	3,500
8 January 1916	Grimsby Town	A	1–0	Mann	3,000
15 January 1916	Notts County	H	2–1	Mann, Elliott	3,500
22 January 1916	Derby County	A	4–1	Crossley (2), Best, Mann	2,000
29 January 1916	Sheffield Wednesday	H	2–2	Holley, Elliott	8,000
5 February 1916	Bradford Park Avenue	A	0–3		5,500
12 February 1916	Leeds City	H	5–1	Connor, Elliott (2), Holley, Crossley	5,000
19 February 1916	Hull City	A	1–2	Elliott	3,000
25 April 1916	Nottingham Forest	H	2–0	James, Elliott	5,000

=== Subsidiary Competition Northern Division ===
Date	Opponents	Home/Away	Result F–A	Scorers	Attendance
4 March 1916	Bradford City	H	1–2	Crossley	3,500
11 March 1916	Barnsley	A	5–1	Holley (pen), Elliott (4)	800
18 March 1916	Leeds City	H	1–1	Elliott	4,500
25 March 1916	Bradford Park Avenue	A	0–2		3,000
1 April 1916	Rochdale	H	2–1	Layton, Connor	4,000
8 April 1916	Bradford City	A	2–2	Elliott, Mann	3,000
15 April 1916	Barnsley	H	4–1	Linley, Holley (3, 1 pen)	3,500
21 April 1916	Rochdale	A	1–1	Holley	4,000
22 April 1916	Leeds City	A	2–1	Slade, Best	7,000
29 April 1916	Bradford Park Avenue	H	1–3	Elliott	4,000
