= Bobby McNeal =

English footballer

Personal information
- Full name: Robert McNeal
- Date of birth: 15 January 1891
- Place of birth: Hobson, County Durham, England
- Date of death: 15 May 1956 (aged 65)
- Place of death: West Bromwich, England
- Height: 5 ft 6 in (1.68 m)
- Position: Left-half

Youth career
- Hobson Wanderers

Senior career*
Years	Team	Apps	(Gls)
1910–1925	West Bromwich Albion	370	(9)
Total		370	(9)

International career
1914	England	2	(0)
	Football League	5	(0)
- * Club domestic league appearances and goals

Robert McNeal (15 January 1891 – 15 May 1956) was an English footballer who played as a left-half. Despite his career running through World War I, he managed nearly 400 appearances in the Football League for West Bromwich Albion, playing in some of the most successful seasons in the club's history. He won the Second Division (1910–11), First Division (1919–20), and Charity Shield (1920), and played in the 1912 FA Cup final.

== Early and personal life ==
Robert McNeal was born on 19 January 1891 in Hobson, near Stanley, County Durham. He was the eldest of three children to John and Hannah (née Bell); his father was a coal miner. He married Emily Elizabeth Howell in 1913 and has two daughters: Rita Marion and Jeanne. After leaving the game, he became a licensee in West Bromwich.

== Club career ==
McNeal played football for the village team before becoming professional with West Bromwich Albion in June 1910. In his first full season he helped the club to the Second Division title. The "Throstles" then finished ninth in the First Division in 1911–12. He also won a runners-up medal in the 1912 FA Cup final when Albion lost 1–0 to Barnsley in a replay at Bramall Lane. Albion went on to post top ten finishes in the league in 1912–13, 1913–14, and 1914–15, before the Football League was suspended due to World War I.

During the war he appeared as a guest player for Fulham, Middlesbrough, Notts County and Port Vale. McNeal was part of West Bromwich Albion's league championship-winning side of 1919–20. The team also won the 1920 Charity Shield with a 2–0 victory over Tottenham Hotspur at White Hart Lane. Albion then dropped to 14th and 13th-place finishes in 1920–21 and 1921–22. They finished seventh in 1922–23 and 16th in 1923–24 before posting a second-place finish in 1924–25 – they ended the campaign just two points behind champions Huddersfield Town. In May 1925, McNeal retired through injury and became a licensee of a pub in the West Bromwich area. From 1926 to 1927, McNeal served as Albion's coach on a part-time basis.

== International career ==
McNeal earned two England caps during the 1914 British Home Championship, playing the two final England internationals before the onset of World War I, which caused the suspension of the competition until 1920. He was one of four England players to win their first cap on 16 March 1914 as Wales were defeated 2–0 at Ninian Park. His second and final cap came on 14 April as Scotland ran out 3–1 winners at Hampden Park. Overall the competition was something of a minor embarrassment for the country, as the Irish finished as champions and England finished third behind the Scots and just one point ahead of the Welsh.

== Career statistics ==
Appearances and goals by club, season and competition
Club	Season	League			FA Cup		Total	
Club	Season	Division	Apps	Goals	Apps	Goals	Apps	Goals
West Bromwich Albion	1910–11	Second Division	29	1	2	0	31	1
West Bromwich Albion	1911–12	First Division	37	0	8	0	45	0
West Bromwich Albion	1912–13	First Division	30	1	3	0	33	1
West Bromwich Albion	1913–14	First Division	36	2	3	0	39	2
West Bromwich Albion	1914–15	First Division	37	2	1	0	38	2
West Bromwich Albion	1919–20	First Division	42	2	1	0	43	2
West Bromwich Albion	1920–21	First Division	37	1	1	0	38	1
West Bromwich Albion	1921–22	First Division	41	0	3	0	44	0
West Bromwich Albion	1922–23	First Division	40	0	4	0	44	0
West Bromwich Albion	1923–24	First Division	29	0	4	0	33	0
West Bromwich Albion	1924–25	First Division	12	0	0	0	12	0
West Bromwich Albion	Total		370	9	30	0	400	9

== Honours ==
West Bromwich Albion

- Football League Second Division: 1910–11
- FA Cup runner-up: 1912
- Football League First Division: 1919–20
- FA Charity Shield: 1920
