= George Lillycrop =

English footballer (1886–1962)

Personal information
- Full name: George Beanland Lillycrop
- Date of birth: 7 December 1886
- Place of birth: Gosport, Hampshire, England
- Date of death: 1962 (aged 75–76)
- Height: 5 ft 8 in (1.73 m)
- Position: Striker

Senior career*
Years	Team	Apps	(Gls)
- South Shields Adelaide F.C.
- North Shields Athletic F.C.
?–1913	Barnsley		
1913–1915	Bolton	52	(32)
- South Shields

Managerial career
- 1938–1944: Crewe Alexandra
- * Club domestic league appearances and goals

George Beanland Lillycrop (sometimes Lilliecrop; 7 December 1886 – 1962) was an English professional footballer who played as a striker for several English sides before and just after the First World War.

== Playing career ==
Lillycrop was born on 7 December 1886, in Gosport. He started his career playing for teams in the North Eastern League before transferring to Barnsley some time before 1910. He played in both FA Cup finals that Barnsley reached in 1910 and 1912. In the first, Barnsley lost in the replay to Newcastle. In 1912, Lillycrop played a critical role in the qualifying rounds, scoring 6 goals, several in replays. The 1912 Final went again to a replay but Barnsley won, defeating West Bromwich Albion by one goal in extra time. Given his key role in the qualifying rounds he does not feature much in the match day reports.

In July 1913, he was transferred to Bolton Wanderers for £1,300. He played a total of 52 games, scoring 32 goals. Bolton reached the FA cup semi-finals in 1915 and were defeated by Sheffield United, captained by George Utley, his fellow wing half from Barnsley. After the war, he returned to the North East playing for South Shields.

== Coaching career ==
After the end of his playing career he took up coaching. He worked for South Shields, Gateshead and Crewe Alexandra.

== Honours ==
Barnsley

- FA Cup: 1912; runner-up 1910
