= George Garratly =

English footballer

George Garratley
Personal information
- Full name: George Garratley
- Date of birth: October 1888
- Place of birth: Walsall, England
- Date of death: 1929 (aged 40–41)
- Height: 5 ft 9 in (1.75 m)
- Position: Defender

Senior career*
Years	Team	Apps	(Gls)
1904	Walsall Constitutional		
1905	Bloxwich Strollers		
1906	Chapel End United		
1907–1909	Walsall		
1909–1919	Wolverhampton Wanderers	217	(6)
1920	Hednesford Town		
- * Club domestic league appearances and goals

George Garratley (October 1888 – 1929) was a footballer who played in the Football League for Wolverhampton Wanderers. Garratley guested for Stoke in 1918–19, making ten appearances.

== Career statistics ==
Appearances and goals by club, season and competition
Club	Season	League			FA Cup		Total	
Club	Season	Division	Apps	Goals	Apps	Goals	Apps	Goals
Wolverhampton Wanderers	1909–10	Second Division	13	0	1	0	14	0
Wolverhampton Wanderers	1910–11	Second Division	38	0	3	0	41	0
Wolverhampton Wanderers	1911–12	Second Division	38	1	4	0	42	1
Wolverhampton Wanderers	1912–13	Second Division	32	1	1	0	33	1
Wolverhampton Wanderers	1913–14	Second Division	27	1	1	0	28	1
Wolverhampton Wanderers	1914–15	Second Division	34	3	2	0	36	3
Wolverhampton Wanderers	1919–20	Second Division	35	0	3	0	38	0
Career total			217	6	15	0	232	6
