= Bob Glendenning =

English footballer and manager (1888–1940)

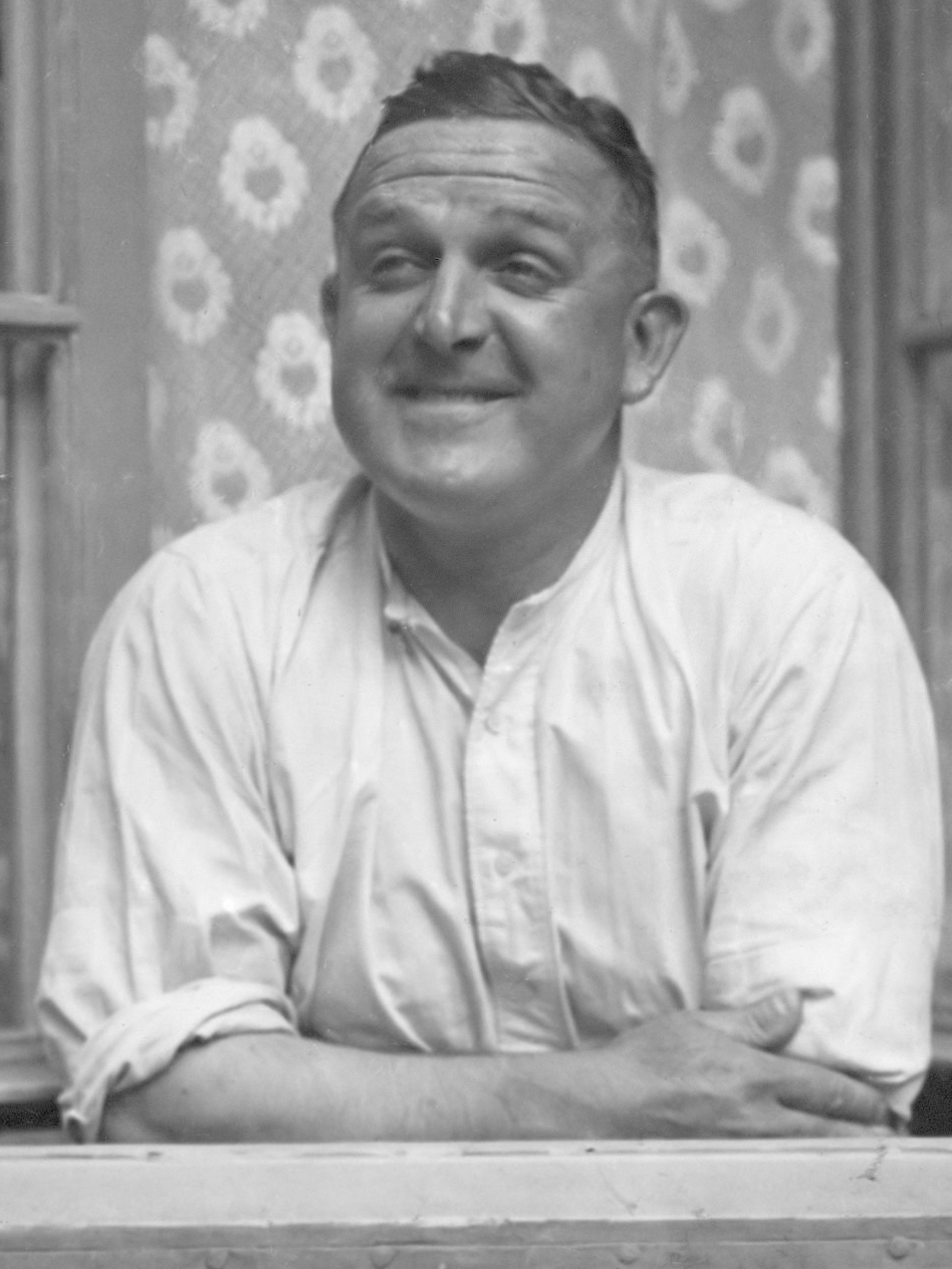
- Glendenning in 1929

Personal information
- Full name: Robert Glendenning
- Date of birth: 6 June 1888
- Place of birth: Washington, County Durham, England
- Date of death: 19 November 1940 (aged 52)
- Place of death: Manchester, England
- Position: Wing half

Senior career*
Years	Team	Apps	(Gls)
- Washington United
1908–1913	Barnsley	141	(1)
1913–1915	Bolton Wanderers	73	(0)
- Accrington Stanley
Total		214	(1)

Managerial career
- 1923: Netherlands
- –1928: Koninklijke HFC
- 1925–1940: Netherlands
- * Club domestic league appearances and goals

Robert Glendenning (6 June 1888 – 19 November 1940) was an English professional footballer, who played as a wing half for several English clubs prior to and just after the First World War. He later went on to coach in the Netherlands, including coaching the Dutch national side.

== Club career ==
He started his career at hometown club Washington United before transferring to Barnsley sometime prior to 1910. He played in both FA Cup finals that Barnsley reached, in 1910 and 1912. In the first, Barnsley lost in the replay to Newcastle United. The second also went to a replay, but Barnsley won, defeating West Bromwich Albion by one goal in extra time. The Manchester Guardian praised his play in the first match, and in the replay Glendenning won the ball from a West Brom player and passed it to Harry Tufnell to score in the last minutes of extra time. The goal was controversial because Glendenning was allegedly off the field of play in the build up to the goal and came back on to win possession without receiving instruction from the referee first. This led directly to a change in the law in which a player must be instructed by the referee before returning to the field of play.

He then moved to Bolton Wanderers, for whom he played a total of 83 games as club captain. Bolton reached the FA Cup semi-finals in 1915, in which they were defeated by Sheffield United, captained by George Utley, Glendenning's fellow wing half from Barnsley. In the 1916–17 season, Glendenning appeared as a wartime guest player with Burnley. After the war he played for Accrington Stanley.

== Coaching career ==
After the end of his playing career, he took up coaching and moved to the Netherlands. He had a short spell, only one game, a 4–1 victory over Switzerland, as coach of the national side in 1923. He then coached Koninklijke HFC until 1928. He was made the permanent coach of the Netherlands in 1925, holding both coaching positions until the 1928 Summer Olympics, when he chose to focus on the national team. He remained the manager of Oranje until 1940, leading them to the World Cup finals in 1934 and 1938. The tournaments would be disappointments, exiting in the first round on both occasions, to Switzerland by a score of 3–2 in 1934, and then to Czechoslovakia by 3–0 in 1938. Glendenning managed Oranje through 87 games, with 36 wins, 36 losses and 15 draws.

Up until October 2017, he remained the Dutch national coach with the most victories. By comparison, the only Dutch coach Rinus Michels to win a major trophy, Euro 1988, had 30 victories from 53 games, over an 18-year (1974 to 1992) on again off again association with the national team. Marco van Basten had 35 wins from 48 games, before being knocked out at the quarter-final stage of Euro 2008. However, as of his third spell in charge, Dick Advocaat has now managed 37 victories from 62 games.

Glendenning's last game as a manager was the 4–2 victory over Belgium played on 21 April 1940; the game was also Abe Lenstra's second international cap. Three weeks later, the Dutch national side was to go to Luxembourg to play their next international match, but the game was never played because of the German invasion of the Netherlands, which forced Glendenning to flee. He managed to get on the last British boat out of Holland to be evacuated as the Dutch surrendered. The true story of his escape is told in the book 'Escape From Holland' by Chris Hunt.

He died on 19 November of that same year from complications of a fall. He is buried in Bolton, England, where the KNVB has maintained and replaced his headstone.

== Honours ==
Barnsley

- FA Cup winner: 1912
- FA Cup runner-up: 1910
