= 1910 FA Cup final =

1910 FA Cup Final
- Event: 1909–10 FA Cup
Barnsley	Newcastle United
- Newcastle United won after a replay

Final
Barnsley	Newcastle United
1	1
- Date: 23 April 1910
- Venue: Crystal Palace, London
- Referee: J.T. Ibbotson
- Attendance: 77,747

Replay
Barnsley	Newcastle United
0	2
- Date: 28 April 1910
- Venue: Goodison Park, Liverpool
- Referee: J.T. Ibbotson
- Attendance: 60,000

The 1910 FA Cup final was the 39th FA Cup final. It was contested by Barnsley and Newcastle United. It took two matches to determine a winner. The first took place at Crystal Palace in south London on 23 April 1910 and the second on 28 April at Goodison Park in Liverpool.

== Road to the Final ==
=== Barnsley ===
Home teams listed first.

Round 1: Blackpool 1–1 Barnsley

Tufnell 1

Replay: Barnsley 6–0 Blackpool

Tufnell 2, Lillycrop 2, TBC

Round 2: Bristol Rovers 0–4 Barnsley

Round 3: Barnsley 1–0 West Bromwich Albion

Round 4: Barnsley 1–0 Queens Park Rangers

Bartrop 1

Semi-final: Barnsley 0–0 Everton

(at Elland Road)

Replay: Barnsley 3–0 Everton

Gadsby, Tufnell, Forman
(at Old Trafford)

=== Newcastle United ===
Home teams listed first.

Round 1: Stoke City 1–1 Newcastle United

Replay: Newcastle United 2–1 Stoke City

Round 2: Newcastle United 4–0 Fulham

Round 3: Newcastle United 3–1 Blackburn Rovers

Round 4: Newcastle United 3–0 Leicester Fosse

Semi-final: Newcastle United 2–0 Swindon

(at White Hart Lane)

== Match summary ==
The match was a hard fought affair, the Manchester Guardian commenting that Barnsley played "one man for the man, another for the ball". Barnsley had the better of the play through the first half. Barnsley played a simple game based on long, low passes into space combined with dribbling individual runs which Newcastle found difficult to counter. Barnsley scored 10 minutes before half time. Bartrop picked up a pass from the Barnsley backs and ran up the pitch, passed McWilliam and kicked the ball across the Newcastle goal mouth. Lillycrop rushing forward tried to score, but missed the ball. It appeared Barnsley had missed their chance, but Tufnell, the left inside forward, managed to get a toe to the ball and put it in the net. After half time Barnsley sat back and defended but it was not until the final 15 minutes that Newcastle were able to mount an effective attack. They abandoned what the Guardian correspondent characterised as their "clever" football and took on Barnsley by running at them. Shepherd had a goal disallowed apparently for offside. Rutherford eventually scored for Newcastle with a header 8 minutes before full-time. Veitch led more attacks but the Barnsley backs held them off. Downs in particular was very effective with his head and feet.

The game ended 1–1.

The Times correspondent was very disappointed with the game and felt the one all score line fair. The Guardian was much more enthusiastic the game and in particular about Barnsleys play and felt they should have won.

The Barnsley team were invited to the Alhambra where scenes from the match were shown.

== Match details ==
23 April 1910
15:30 BST

Barnsley	1–1	Newcastle United
Tufnell 37'		Rutherford 83'

Crystal Palace
Attendance: 77,747
Referee: J.T. Ibbotson

Barnsley	Newcastle United

GK	Fred Mearns
FB	Dickie Downs
FB	Harry Ness
HB	Bob Glendenning
CH	Tommy Boyle (c)
HB	George Utley
OF	Wilfred Bartrop
IF	Harry Tufnell
CF	George Lillycrop
IF	Ernie Gadsby
OF	Tom Forman
Manager:
Arthur Fairclough

GK	Jimmy Lawrence
FB	Bill McCracken
FB	Tony Whitson
HB	Colin Veitch (c)
CH	Wilf Low
HB	Peter McWilliam
OF	Jock Rutherford
IF	James Howie
CF	Albert Shepherd
IF	Sandy Higgins
OF	George Wilson
Secretary-manager:
Frank Watt

== Replay summary ==
The replay was held at Everton's ground Goodison Park. The Manchester Guardian felt this was unfair to Barnsley as they had put Everton out of the FA Cup following a hard fought semi-final that also went to a replay and as a result any local supporters would hardly be neutral. Despite heavy rain a large excitable crowd turned out to watch the match, spilling onto the pitch before kick off they had to be restrained by mounted police (200 to 300 also invaded the pitch during the match but did not interfere with play). Jack Carr replaced an injured Tony Whiston in the Newcastle defence. The pitch was very heavy after the rain but nonetheless the play was fast and exciting.

The Newcastle team was considerably improved. The half backs held the Barnsley forward line throughout the match. The defence was also improved with Carr playing much better than Whiston. Lawrence in goal was troubled only once, when caught off his line he was forced to make a diving save when Bartrop broke through.

The Newcastle forward line was also improved. They received good passes from the half backs and made use of them. Wilson and Higgins on the left wing doing most of the work in the first half, Rutherford and Howie on the right in the second half. Newcastle could have scored several times in the first half but both goals came in the second, the second a penalty, both were scored by Shepherd.

Barnsley played their hard, rough game but they were defeated by a rejuvenated Newcastle team who despite the heavy, wet ground played a mixed game blending long passes with dribbling and runs forward.

The Cup was presented by Lord Derby and medals by the Lady Mayoress of Liverpool. They were thanked by Everton's local MP, Mr F. E. Smith K.C. The speeches were largely drowned out by the cheering of the crowd who occupied most of the pitch.

== Replay details ==
28 April 1910
15:30 BST

Barnsley	0–2	Newcastle United
		Shepherd 52' 62' (pen.)

Goodison Park
Attendance: 60,000
Referee: J.T. Ibbotson

Barnsley	Newcastle United

GK	Fred Mearns
FB	Dickie Downs
FB	Harry Ness
HB	Bob Glendenning
CH	Tommy Boyle (c)
HB	George Utley
OF	Wilfred Bartrop
IF	Harry Tufnell
CF	George Lillycrop
IF	Ernie Gadsby
OF	Tom Forman
Manager:
Arthur Fairclough

GK	Jimmy Lawrence
FB	Bill McCracken
FB	Jack Carr
HB	Colin Veitch (c)
CH	Wilf Low
HB	Peter McWilliam
OF	Jock Rutherford
IF	James Howie
CF	Albert Shepherd
IF	Sandy Higgins
OF	George Wilson
Secretary-manager:
Frank Watt

Match and replay rules

- 90 minutes.
- 30 minutes of extra-time if necessary.
- Replay if scores still level.
- No substitutes

== Legacy ==
A souvenir booklet produced for the match fetched £3,000 at auction in September 2008.
