= Jim McConnon =

English cricketer

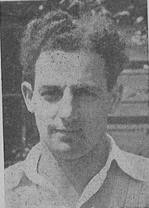
- McConnon in 1954

Personal information
- Full name: James Edward McConnon
- Born: 21 June 1922; Burnopfield, County Durham, England
- Died: 26 January 2003 (aged 80); Altrincham, Greater Manchester, England
- Batting: Right-handed
- Bowling: Right-arm offbreak

International information
- National side: England
- Test debut: 22 July 1954 v Pakistan
- Last Test: 12 August 1954 v Pakistan

Career statistics
Competition	Test	First-class
Matches	2	256
Runs scored	18	4,661
Batting average	9.00	14.38
100s/50s	0/0	0/13
Top score	11	95
Balls bowled	216	37,449
Wickets	4	819
Bowling average	18.50	19.88
5 wickets in innings	0	49
10 wickets in match	0	12
Best bowling	3/19	8/36
Catches/stumpings	4/–	151/–
- Source: CricInfo, 7 November 2022

James Edward McConnon (21 June 1922 – 26 January 2003) was an English cricketer, who played in two Tests in 1954 as an off-spin bowler. He played for Glamorgan from 1950 to 1961, albeit missing the 1956 season when he decided to play for Burnley in the Lancashire League. His 819 first-class wickets cost less than 20 runs each.

== Life and career ==
Jim McConnon was born in Burnopfield, County Durham. His was a late conversion to cricket, having played football for Aston Villa and Newport County. A knee injury resulted in McConnon switching sports and, for a short time, his lovely bowling action utilising long spinner's fingers threatened Jim Laker's role in the England team.

He made his first-class debut for Glamorgan against Surrey at the start of the 1950 season, in the same match as Don Shepherd. He claimed 100 wickets in a season three times, with 136 at 16.07 in 1951 being his best. Against the South African tourists in that year he took 6 for 27 including a hat-trick, helping Glamorgan to an unlikely victory.

McConnon's selection for the Ashes tour of 1954-55 was controversial in that it meant that Laker was not taken. As it was McConnon broke a finger during the tour, and he returned home early.

His season as a professional in the Lancashire League was successful: he topped the League bowling averages with 52 wickets at 6.8, and Burnley won the championship. After he left first-class cricket he played a few seasons of Minor Counties cricket for Cheshire.

McConnon and his wife Pauline had three children, Michael, Catherine and Christopher.

McConnon died in Altrincham, Greater Manchester, at the age of 80.
