= Dickie Downs =

English footballer (1886–1949)

Personal information
- Full name: John Thomas Downs
- Date of birth: 13 August 1886
- Place of birth: Middridge, Newton Aycliffe, Durham, England
- Date of death: 24 March 1949 (aged 62)
- Place of death: Durham, England
- Height: 5 ft 6 1/2 in (1.69 m)
- Position: Full back

Youth career
- –1907: Crook Town

Senior career*
Years	Team	Apps	(Gls)
1907–1908	Shildon Athletic		
1908–1920	Barnsley	284	(10)
1920–1924	Everton	92	(0)
1924–1925	Brighton & Hove Albion	16	(0)

International career
1920	England	1	(0)
- * Club domestic league appearances and goals

John Thomas "Dickie" Downs (13 August 1886 – 24 March 1949) was a footballer who played as a full back for Barnsley, Everton, Brighton & Hove Albion and England.

== Club career ==
Dickie Downs played for Barnsley between 1908 and 1920 and was a member of the team who contested the 1910 FA Cup Final against Newcastle but lost after forcing a replay. He won a FA Cup winners medal in 1912 when Barnsley beat West Bromwich Albion in another replay after the first match ended goalless. The Manchester Guardian, when reporting on both 1912 matches, selected him as one of the better players on the pitch.

Downs' career was broken by the First World War but he returned to Oakwell in 1919 and yet again proved an annoyance to West Bromwich Albion in 1920 when Barnsley knocked them out of the FA Cup.

By now Downs was thirty-three years of age and his performances in the cup alerted the top flight clubs that he was still good enough to play at the highest level. Downs had rejected many offers to step up during his career in the hope of gaining promotion with Barnsley but when Everton approached him after Barnsley's second round cup exit at the end of January 1920 he recognised it as his last chance and accepted a move to the First Division. Downs was an ever-present in his first full season at Goodison Park and went on to make ninety-two First Division appearances over five years but by 1923 he was finding it increasingly difficult to get into the first eleven and accepted an offer to step down into the third division with Brighton & Hove Albion.

== International career ==
Downs' first season among the elite clubs was a success and brought him to the attention of the International selectors playing for England in a Home Championship game against Ireland on 23 October 1920 at Roker Park. England won 2–0.

== Honours ==
Barnsley

- FA Cup: winners 1912; runners-up 1910
