= Horace Pearson =

English footballer

Personal information
- Date of birth: 6 April 1907
- Place of birth: Tamworth, England
- Position: Goalkeeper

Youth career
- Tamworth Castle

Senior career*
Years	Team	Apps	(Gls)
–1928	Nuneaton Town		
1928–1929	Luton Town	0	(0)
1929–1931	Blackpool	55	(0)
1931–1933	Oldham Athletic	38	(0)
1933–1936	Coventry City	108	(0)
1937–1938	Newport County		
1938	Barry Town		
1938–1939	Bristol City		
- Scarborough
- * Club domestic league appearances and goals

Horace Pearson (6 April 1907 – unknown) was an English footballer who played as a goalkeeper. He played in the Football League First Division for Blackpool.

== Personal life ==
Pearson was from a footballing family, with both his uncle, Hubert Pearson, and cousin, Harold Pearson playing for West Bromwich Albion.
