= Bertie Smart =

English footballer

Personal information
- Full name: Bertie Smart
- Date of birth: 9 February 1891
- Place of birth: Hednesford, England
- Date of death: 1950 (aged 58–59)
- Height: 5 ft 10 in (1.78 m)
- Position: Full back

Senior career*
Years	Team	Apps	(Gls)
1910–1911	Hednesford St Mary's		
1911–1912	Hednesford Town		
1912–1913	Wolverhampton Wanderers	3	(0)
1913–1914	Cannock Town		
1914–1918	Bloxwich Strollers		
Total		3	(0)
- * Club domestic league appearances and goals

Bertie Smart (9 February 1891 – 1950) was an English footballer who played in the Football League for Crewe Alexandra. Smart guested for Stoke during World War I, playing once in 1918–19.

== Career statistics ==
Appearances and goals by club, season and competition
Club	Season	League			FA Cup		Total	
Club	Season	Division	Apps	Goals	Apps	Goals	Apps	Goals
Wolverhampton Wanderers	1912–13	Second Division	3	0	0	0	3	0
Career total			3	0	0	0	3	0
