= Andrew Robinson Stoney =

Anglo-Irish politician (1747–1810)

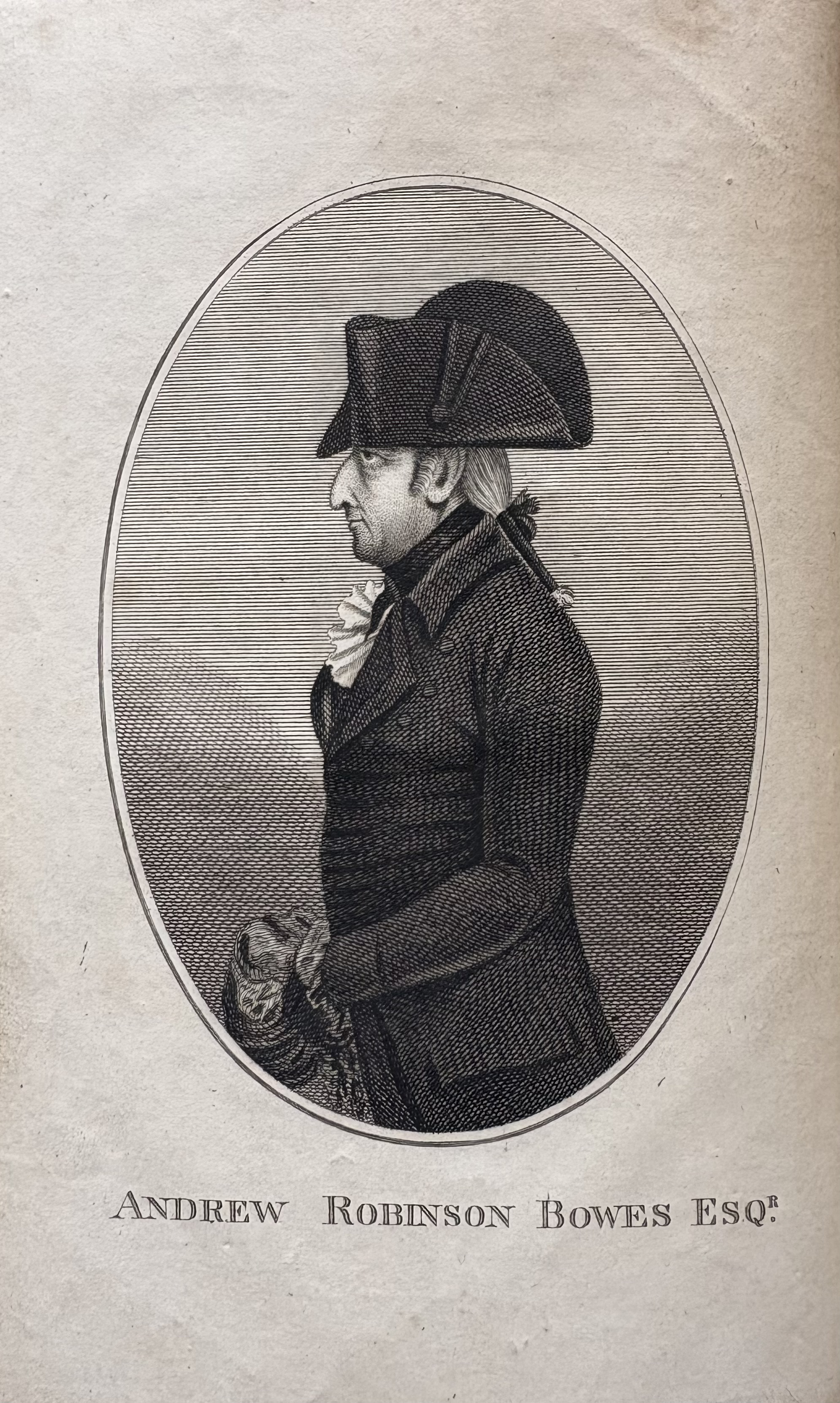
- Born: 19 June 1747; Greyfort House, Borrisokane, County Tipperary, Ireland
- Died: 16 January 1810 (aged 62); King's Bench Prison, Southwark, London, England
- Other name: Andrew Robinson Stoney-Bowes
- Spouses: Hannah Newton (m. 1768; died 1775); Mary Bowes, Countess of Strathmore and Kinghorne (m. 1777; div. 1789)
- Children: 2

Andrew Robinson Stoney (married name Stoney-Bowes; 19 June 1747 – 16 January 1810) was an Anglo-Irish member of parliament, high sheriff, and criminal.

While Andrew Stoney-Bowes was a member of parliament for Newcastle-upon-Tyne (1780–4) and also High Sheriff of Northumberland, he is perhaps best remembered for his marriage to Mary Eleanor Bowes, the Dowager Countess of Strathmore and Kinghorne, during which, it was later shown, he was severely abusive towards his wife. Mary Eleanor Bowes became known as "The Unhappy Countess", perhaps due to the abuse she suffered, and their marriage ended in scandal.

He was the inspiration for the fictional character of Barry Lyndon.

== Early life and first marriage ==
Stoney was born on 19 June 1747 (Note: Also cited as 1 June 1747.) at Greyfort House in Borrisokane, County Tipperary to George Stoney, a landowner and farmer, and Elizabeth Stoney (née Johnston). From a wealthy military Anglo-Irish family, Stoney's paternal great-grandfather migrated to County Tipperary from Yorkshire following the Williamite War where he acquired sufficient property and built Greyfort House. The eldest of five brothers and six sisters, Stoney's disinterest in running the family estate forced his father to choose his second son Thomas as successor.

In November 1764 Stoney's uncle, Colonel Robinson, secured him a commission as an ensign in the 4th (The King's Own) Regiment of Foot. Stoney arrived in England in Spring 1765 however, by the following June he had run up debts of around £40 and had been reprimanded on several occasions by senior offices for his bad temper, insolence, and "debauched lifestyle". With the intervention of Colonel Robinson, Stoney was sent back to Ireland in July 1766 before later returning to the regiment by the following February.

Whilst stationed in Newcastle upon Tyne Stoney met his future wife Hannah Newton (1747–1775) in the autumn of 1767. The daughter and sole heir of the deceased coal merchant William Newton of Burnopfield, Newton owned an estate and house at Cold Pike Hill and was believed to have £20,000 in her own right. (Note: Also cited as William Newton of Newcastle upon Tyne.) However, a clause in Newton's father's will stipulated that his daughter's future husband must own property providing an annual income of at least £50 in order for her to receive her inheritance. In a series of letters to his father, Stoney begged him to transfer enough of the family property to him in order to satisfy the terms of Newton's father's will. Stoney's father initially refused but had relented by May 1768, and began drawing up the title deeds. On 1 September 1768, Stoney married Newton. Stoney was rumoured to have mistreated Newton during their marriage, and that he ultimately caused her death to assume her inheritance. Newton and Stoney had at least one stillborn child.

== Second marriage ==
Mary Eleanor Bowes, the widowed Countess of Strathmore and Kinghorne, was engaged to her lover, George Gray, in the summer of 1776 when she met the outwardly charming but wily Anglo-Irish adventurer, Andrew Robinson Stoney, who manipulated his way into her household (using the governess of the children, Eliza Planta) and her bed. Calling himself "Captain Stoney" – although he was, in reality, a lieutenant in the British Army – he insisted on fighting a duel in Mary's honour with the editor of The Morning Post newspaper which had published scurrilous articles about her private life. In fact, he had himself written the articles that criticised her, as well as those defending her; and the duel between Stoney and the newspaper's editor was probably staged. Pretending to be mortally wounded in the duel, Stoney persuaded the countess as his dying wish to marry him. On 17 January 1777, Stoney married Bowes at St James's Church, Piccadilly and was carried to the altar on a stretcher for his marriage to the Countess. Staging a miraculous recovery immediately after the marriage, Stoney took his wife's surname (as stipulated by her father's will) and was styled Andrew Robinson Stoney Bowes. He served as High Sheriff of Northumberland in 1780 and was elected MP for Newcastle later the same year, serving until he lost the next election in 1784.

After his marriage to the Countess, he behaved brutally towards her in a sustained catalogue of abuse, including physical, mental and financial abuse. When he discovered that she had secretly made a pre-nuptial agreement safeguarding her finances, he forced her to sign a revocation handing control to him. Among other outrages, he imprisoned her in her own house, and forced her and one of her daughters to go into exile in Paris. They returned after a writ had been served on him. At the same time, he raped the maids, invited prostitutes into the home and fathered numerous illegitimate children.

Mary Eleanor gave birth in August 1777 to a daughter Mary, probably the child of her prior liaison with Gray. Bowes took the girl as his own child and the birth was registered as such in November 1777, but he later broadcast her illegitimacy. The couple had a son, William Johnstone Bowes, born on 8 May 1782.

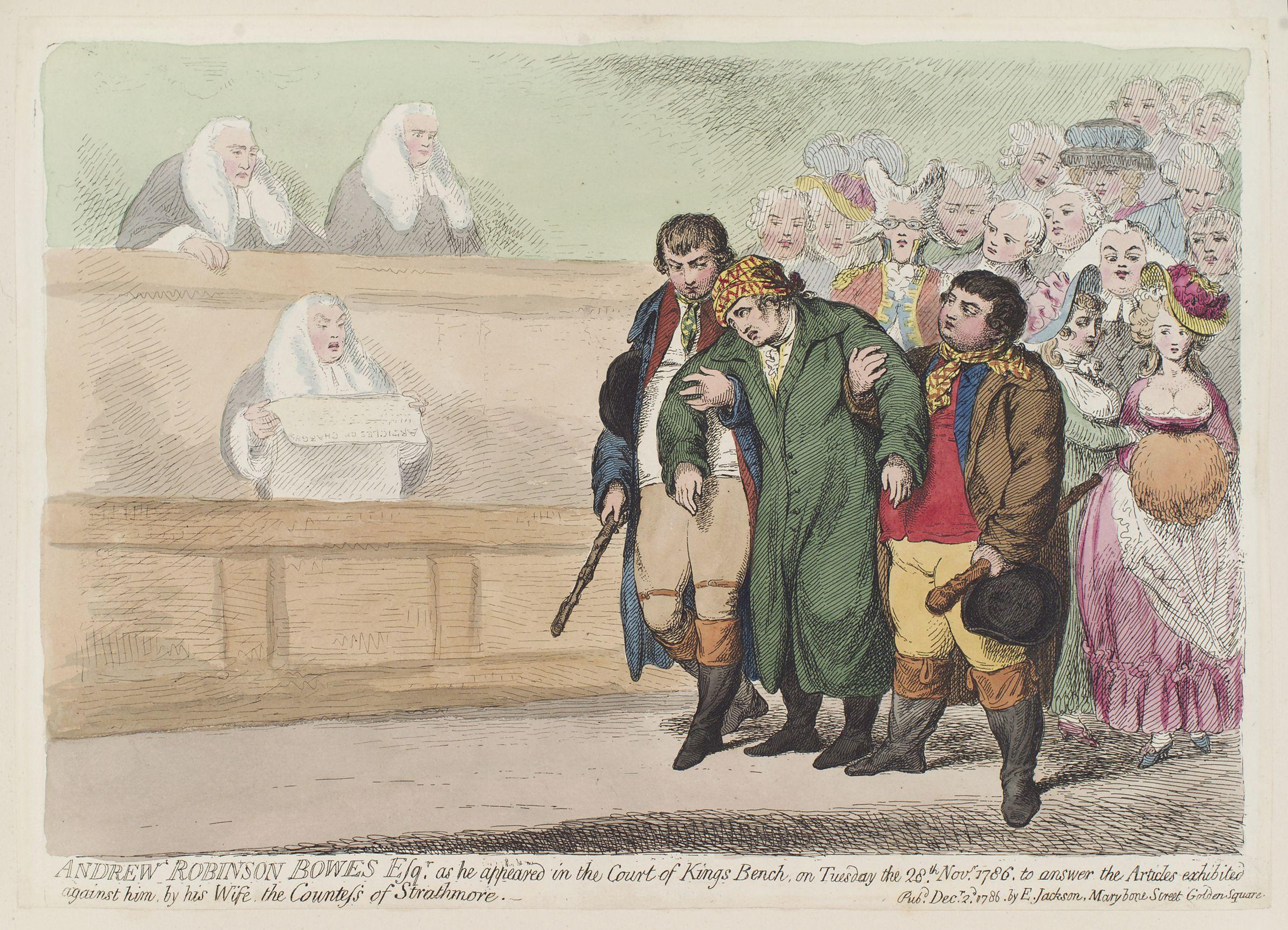
Andrew Robinson Bowes Esq. as he appeared in the Court of King's Bench, on 28 November 1786 to answer the articles brought against him by his wife, the Countess of Strathmore

Finally, in 1785, with the help of loyal maids, the Countess escaped his custody and filed for divorce through the ecclesiastical courts. Having lost the first round of this courtroom battle, Stoney Bowes abducted Mary with the help of a gang of accomplices, carried her off to the north country, threatened to rape and kill her, gagged and beat her, and carried her around the countryside on horseback in one of the coldest spells of the coldest winter of the century. The country was alerted, and Stoney Bowes was eventually arrested and the countess rescued.

The legal battles continued. Stoney Bowes and his accomplices were found guilty of conspiracy to abduct Mary, and he was sentenced to three years in prison. Meanwhile, he lost the divorce case and the battle to retain the Bowes fortune. The trials were sensational and the talk of London. Although the countess initially won public sympathy, Bowes eventually turned many against her – partly because of the libels he succeeded in putting about (buying shares in a newspaper for the purpose and publishing the 'Confessions' he had earlier forced her to write) – and partly because the general apprehension was that she had behaved badly in attempting to prevent her husband's access to her fortune. There had also been an affair between her and the brother of one of the lawyers, which became public knowledge, and, Stoney Bowes alleged, an affair with her footman, George Walker. Mary finally obtained her divorce at the High Court of Delegates on 2 March 1789 which revealed how Bowes had systematically deprived the countess of her liberty and abused her.

His three-year prison term expired c.1790, with the finalised divorce of 2nd March 1789 stripping him of the Bowes fortune.

Rather than walking free, he is held for accumulated debts, without any substantial period of liberty in between. His Stamford Mercury obituary states he spent "the remaining 23 years of his life in prison or within the prison rules, first for his crime, and next for debts," which counts back almost exactly to his 1787 conviction.

He remained imprisoned until his death.

== Death ==
Stoney died on 16 January 1810, aged 62, at the Rules of the King's Bench Prison in Southwark, London.

== Fictional representations ==
William Thackeray learned of Stoney Bowes' life story from the Countess's grandson John Bowes and used it as the basis of his 1844 novel The Luck of Barry Lyndon.. The novel, in turn, become the source of the 1975 film Barry Lyndon directed by Stanley Kubrick.

== See also ==
- Bowes-Lyon

== Sources ==
- Arnold, Ralph (1957). The Unhappy Countess. London: Constable.
- Foot, Jesse (1810–1815). The lives of Andrew Robinson Bowes, Esq., and the Countess of Strathmore, written from thirty-three years' professional attendance, from letters, and other well authenticated documents. London: Becket and Porter; Sherwood, Neely, and Jones.
- Parker, Derek (2006). The Trampled Wife: The Scandalous Life of Mary Eleanor Bowes. Stroud, Gloucestershire: Sutton Publishing. ISBN 0750939559.
- Moore, Wendy (2010) [2009]. Wedlock: The True Story of the Disastrous Marriage and Remarkable Divorce of Mary Eleanor Bowes, Countess of Strathmore. London: Phoenix. ISBN 978-0-307-45223-8.
