= The Luck of Barry Lyndon =

1844 novel by William Makepeace Thackeray

- Author: William Makepeace Thackeray
- Language: English
- Genre: Picaresque novel
- Published: 1844
- Publication place: United Kingdom
- Media type: Print
- Pages: 224
- LC Class: PR5608.A2 H37

The Luck of Barry Lyndon is a picaresque novel by English author William Makepeace Thackeray, first published as a serial in Fraser's Magazine in 1844, about a member of the Irish gentry trying to become a member of the English aristocracy. Thackeray, who based the novel on the life and exploits of the Anglo-Irish rake and fortune-hunter Andrew Robinson Stoney, later reissued it under the title The Memoirs of Barry Lyndon, Esq. The novel is narrated by Lyndon himself, who functions as a quintessentially unreliable narrator.

The novel was adapted by Stanley Kubrick into his 1975 film Barry Lyndon.

== Plot summary ==
Redmond Barry of Ballybarry, born to a genteel but ruined Irish family, fancies himself a gentleman. At the prompting of his mother, he learns what he can of courtly manners and swordplay but fails at more scholarly subjects like Latin. He is a passionate, hot-tempered young man who develops a deep love for Nora, his cousin, who is a few years older than Redmond. However, even though Nora enjoys flirting with Redmond, she is only interested in a man with money.

Redmond becomes angered when Nora is courted by John Quin, who is not only wealthy but also a respected officer and nobleman. A duelling challenge is issued, but Nora's family sees an opportunity to drive him off and secretly load his pistol with tow, a dummy load of heavy, knotted fibres.

Quin fakes his death, and Redmond is convinced by Nora's parents that he will be charged with murder. As expected, he flees to Dublin and falls in with swindlers who take advantage of his naivety. Left penniless and with creditors at his heels, Redmond enlists as a common private in a British Army infantry regiment headed for service in Germany during the Seven Years' War.

Once in Germany, despite a promotion to corporal, he hates the army and seeks to desert. When Lieutenant Fakenham is wounded and left for dead, Redmond seduces a rich peasant woman to get him food and shelter. Redmond pretends to suffer from insanity, and after several days absconds with the lieutenant's uniform, papers, and money. As part of his ruse, he convinces the locals that he is the real Lieutenant Fakenham, and the wounded man is the mad Corporal Barry. He then rides off for a neutral part of Germany to seek his fortune.

His bad luck continues, however, as he is quickly captured by a Prussian officer. The German soon realises that Redmond is a deserter, but rather than turn him over to the British to be hanged, impresses him into the Prussian Army (for a bounty). Redmond hates Prussian service as much or more than he hated British service, but the men are carefully watched to prevent desertion. Redmond marches with Frederick's army into the Battle of Kunersdorf and barely survives. He saves the life of Captain Potzdorff; the captain takes him in as his aide and later gets Redmond a job working for the Prussian state ministry.

After several months have passed, a stranger travelling under Austrian protection arrives in Berlin. Redmond is asked to spy on the stranger, an older man called "Chevalier de Balibari" (sc. Ballybarry). He immediately realises that this is his uncle, a notorious Catholic adventurer who disappeared many years ago. The uncle uses his connections to smuggle himself and his nephew out of Prussia, and they quickly take up lives as gamblers and spendthrifts.

Eventually, the Barrys end up in a Rhineland duchy. After winning a large sum of money, enough to present himself as a rich aristocrat, Redmond schemes to marry into the family of a young German heiress. Again, fortune turns against him, and a series of circumstances undermines his complex plan. (The story of the unhappy Princess Olivia was based on a scandalous account of Duchess Augusta of Brunswick-Wolfenbüttel by Étienne-Léon de Lamothe-Langon.) The two Barrys are subsequently forced out of Germany in disgrace.

While staying in France following his uncle's death, Redmond comes into the acquaintance of the Countess of Lyndon, an extraordinarily wealthy noblewoman married to a much older man in poor health. He has some success in seducing the lady, but her husband clings to life. Eventually, she and her husband return to England. Redmond is upset but bides his time. Upon hearing that the husband has died the following year, he makes his move on the Countess.

In a series of adventures, Redmond bullies and seduces the Countess, who marries him somewhat under duress, but also falls in love with him. After the wedding, he remodels her home, Hackton Castle, at great expense. Count Barry Lyndon (as he now calls himself) says several times in the narrative that he is incapable of managing money, despite his history of poverty and hardship. He looks after a few childhood benefactors in Ireland, including his cousin Ulick (Nora's brother, who had often stood up for him as a boy), whom he personally styles into a fashionable young socialite.

As the American Revolutionary War breaks out, Barry seeks to raise his prestige, financing a regiment of men to serve in America and gaining control of the Lyndon family pocket borough so he may sit in Parliament. Then his good fortunes ebb again: his stepson (and his wife's heir), Lord Bullingdon, is reported dead in America; as Barry had commissioned the boy commander of his regiment, he is accused of plotting his demise. His own child, Bryan, dies in a tragic horse-riding accident at nine years of age. This, combined with Barry's profligate spending practices, leads to his ruin. With his son dead, he is now at the mercy of his wife's hostile cousins, who gain control of the Lyndon estate.

As the "memoir" ends, Barry is separated from his wife and placed in Fleet Prison as a debtor. A small stipend provided by his wife allows him to live in moderate luxury at first, and his elderly mother lodges close by to tend to him. But Lord Bullingdon is not dead; he had been captured and imprisoned but survived until the end of the war. When the Countess dies, her son is quick to disown his stepfather and cut off his allowance. Barry dies of complications from drinking cheap prison liquor.

== Writing and publication ==
=== A difficult writing process ===
Thackeray began writing The Luck of Barry Lyndon: A Romance of the Last Century. By Fitz-Boodle in Paris in October 1843, and Fraser's began publishing installments starting in January of the following year. Throughout the monthly releases, Thackeray managed to keep an advance of one or two chapters, but in October 1844, the promised manuscript was not ready on time, and the editor-in-chief Nickisson published another text in its place. The author complains about the difficulty of the task, which requires much more reading than he thought and deals with a subject that is not very sympathetic. He wrote on 14 August 1844 that it had become a nightmare and with relief, on 3 November 1844, he finished the last instalment, noting: "Finished Barry after much agony last night." The final part was written during a trip to Egypt, and the ultimate chapter in Malta in October 1844 on the way back, while the ship was in quarantine in the port of Valletta.

The original title of the 1844 publication contains the word luck, which in this context does not mean "chance" but "worldly success". The choice of this word indicates that this success results from the wealth and social importance that come from marrying the kingdom's richest widow. According to a terminology peculiar to Barry, the alternation between luck and ill-luck marks the fluctuations of his fortune.

The first edition of 1844 has two asymmetrical parts: sixteen chapters are devoted to Barry's social ascent, and three (published in September, November, and December 1844) to his decline and fall.

=== The second publication in England ===
When republished in 1865, (Note: However, a pirated edition was published in the United States in 1852.) along with several other stories, in a book titled Miscellanies; the novel became The Memoirs of Barry Lyndon, Esq., By Himself, the publisher's initiative followed by a plethora of pompous mentions emphasizing the grandiose destiny of the scoundrel.

This version contains some modifications: the first two chapters are merged into one; the beginning of chapter XVII in the second part is deleted, as is a long passage from the conclusion dealing with immanent justice. Originally, Thackeray wrote that this justice is absent from this world, with villains remaining rich while honest people are just as poor; and adding later: "Justice, great God! Does human life show justice in this way? Do the good always ride in a gilded carriage and the wicked go to the hospice? Is the charlatan never preferred to the capable? Does the world always reward merit, never fall for verbiage, never rush to hear some ass bray from his pulpit?" Some third-person digressions, actually intrusions by the author, are reinserted in the first person, as Barry's words. The pseudonym Fitz-Boodle is abandoned, and Miscellanies in its entirety is signed by William Makepeace Thackeray.

The book was harshly judged during its serialization, but that changed upon its publication in volumes. By 1856, Thackeray was recognized as a master of the English novel and his works appreciated with greater consideration. The Saturday Review, founded by Alexander Beresford Hope in 1855, considered Barry Lyndon the most characteristic and successful of Thackeray's works. Several of Thackeray's colleagues emphasized the tour de force represented by this novel, particularly Trollope, who wrote: "if Dickens revealed the best of his creative power early in life, Thackeray showed himself to have a superior intellect. Never has the strength of his mind been raised higher than in Barry Lyndon, and I know of no storyteller whose intellectual faculties can surpass this prodigious enterprise." American writer William Dean Howells, who read the novel as early as 1852, called it "the most perfect creation [...] a fabulous feat of pure irony." Anne Thackeray Ritchie, the novelist's daughter, after recounting the anecdote in which her father advised her against reading the book, wrote: "Certainly, it is a difficult book to love, but one admires it for its consummate power and art."

== Inspiration ==
=== Andrew Robinson Stoney-Bowes ===
Thackeray got the idea for the novel during a visit with the art collector John Bowes (whom he knew from school) to Streatlam Castle in June and July 1841. In Fraser's Magazine, he wrote:

During my travels in the provinces, I have found material (a character, rather) for a story; I am certain that there is material for amusement in this… for my story about BARRY-LYNN (or whatever name one might give him)[...].

In fact, these documents come from the Strathmore family, of which Bowes was an illegitimate descendant, and are collected in a pamphlet by Jesse Foot titled Lives of Andrew Robinson Stoney-Bowes and the Countess of Strathmore, published in London in 1810. Bowes owns an annotated copy that Thackeray probably knew about, and the character of Andrew Robinson Bowes immediately fascinates him.

=== The Irish Robin Hood ===
According to other sources, an inspiration for Barry Lyndon was James Freney, the "Irish Robin Hood", whose adventures Thackeray read about in an inn in Galway in 1841, whom he places in his novel on Barry's path in Ireland shortly after his departure for the great world, and who is briefly mentioned in chapter IV, when Barry learns about his exploits from Mrs. Fitzsimmons. But while Freney, in Thackeray's words, "declines great deeds with all modesty", Barry brandishes "little deeds high and loud". According to another hypothesis, the model encompasses the Irish in general, whom Thackeray sketched in his Irish Sketch Book of 1843, calling them "this brilliant, audacious, belligerent, exuberant, whiskey-drinking people".

=== An Irish snobbery ===
In fact, Barry Lyndon contains several episodes from Thackeray's Irish Sketch Book, such as Barry's arrival in Dublin, whereupon he is greeted with fervor and adulation. In his travel journal, Thackeray wrote:

There is candor in the way these brave people regard their ecclesiastics and respect all titles, whether real or spurious [...] Do the Irish have so many reasons to respect their aristocrats that they must chronicle all their movements and not only admire their genuine nobles, but make up others to admire in turn?.

=== A cosmopolitan novel ===
Finally, as Thackeray wrote, he travelled constantly, hence, according to some critics, the cosmopolitan aspect of the novel, with significant episodes set in France or Germany, and also some details echoing the author's Middle Eastern tour, such as Barry's stay in Ludwigslust, where he is accompanied by a "negro" named Zamor, dresses in Turkish clothing, and stays in a "palace arranged in an Oriental and quite sumptuous manner".

== Themes ==
=== A question of genealogy ===
From the first paragraphs of his narrative, with the help of heraldists, the Englishman Gwillim and the Frenchman Louis Pierre d'Hozier (p. 13, then 139, according to the 1975 edition used as a reference), Barry takes stock of his lineage: "I am of the opinion that there is no gentleman in all of Europe who has not heard of the Barry family of Barryogue, in the kingdom of Ireland [...]" Throughout the novel, he frequently returns to this subject, especially in chapter IV where his uncle, the Chevalier de Bali-Bari, asserts that this is "the only knowledge becoming of a gentleman." In fact, Thackeray himself shared this concern for genealogy, particularly while writing the novel; Fraser's Magazine had just featured Drummond (a list of noble families with mention of their genealogy) as a theme before The Luck of Barry Lyndon.

=== Nobility of heart ===
This question of nobility of heart as opposed to that of birth is in the air: Dickens takes it up four years after Barry Lyndon in Great Expectations (1860), another first-person novel, where he has Herbert Pocket say exactly the same thing as he undertakes to instill some life principles in young Pip and quotes his father Matthew Pocket: "It is one of his principles that no man has ever behaved like a gentleman without first having been, since the world began, a gentleman at heart. He says, there is no veneer that can hide the grain of wood, and the more varnish you put on, the more the grain will express itself." In the same novel, Joe Gargery the blacksmith, who has always protected Pip from the wrath of his shrewish sister, goes to London to see his young brother-in-law. Not knowing quite what to do with his hat on arrival, he realizes that Pip is now ashamed of him; sorry for not having respected his rank, he returns disillusioned to his forge, while Pip, led astray by snobbery, says, "He made me lose my temper and exasperated me" (chapter XXVII, p. 631).

=== Events in Ireland ===
Another concern of Thackeray's is the events in Ireland: although the story of Barry Lyndon is supposed to take place in the 18th century, the book echoes the Anglo-Irish relations of the first half of the 19th century, especially the campaign for the abolition of the Act of Union, which, under the impetus of Daniel O'Connell, raged in the 1840s and culminated in 1843 with the revival of the so-called Irish Home Rule movement.

=== The tyrannical rakehell ===
The last part of the story, concerning Redmond Barry's tumultuous relationship with Lady Lyndon, is inspired by the life of Andrew Robinson Stoney-Bowes, a type of character that the English commonly call a "rake" or "rakehell", meaning a gambler, debaucher, reveller, and indebted person. According to Robert A. Colby, the plot involving the Princess of X is based on what Thackeray called "a silly little book", L'Empire, ou, Dix ans sous Napoléon (1836) by Étienne-Léon de Lamothe-Langon, which relates the execution of Princess Caroline by the King of Wurttemberg for adultery. (Note: Due to a lack of historical documents, this event cannot be authenticated and appears to be fictional.) The two stories seem to have merged in Thackeray's mind, as both involve tyrannical husbands, hysterical wives, and adultery against a backdrop of a corrupt society.

=== The Irishman William Maginn ===
Barry's grim ending echoes that of the Irish journalist and co-founder of Fraser's Magazine William Maginn. "Maginn a superb subject for a little morality", commented Thackeray upon reading an obituary tribute in Fraser's. Unlike Barry, who is uneducated, Maginn is a witty scholar, but they share an easy charm and an abyssal prodigality, and in 1842 Maginn's indebtedness landed him in Fleet Prison, from which he only emerged, consumed by tuberculosis, to die that year.

=== The dandy George Brummell ===
A parallel can also be drawn between Barry's shameful end in prison and the miserable exile in France of Beau Brummell, who fled his debts and whose career has been in the spotlight since William Jesse published his biography in 1844. Thackeray reviewed that book in the Morning Chronicle of 6 May 1844 (reprinted in Gordon N. Ray's Thackeray's Contributions to the Morning Chronicle) while Barry Lyndon was being written. Moreover, in chapter XIII, Thackeray places an allusion in the form of a wink under the pen of his narrator hero:

Think of the fashion of London being led by a Br-mm-l! [Footnote: This manuscript must have been written at the time when Mr. Brummel was the leader of the London fashion.] a nobody’s son: a low creature, who can no more dance a minuet than I can talk Cherokee; who cannot even crack a bottle like a gentleman; who never showed himself to be a man with his sword in his hand: as we used to approve ourselves in the good old times, before that vulgar Corsican upset the gentry of the world!

This was an exclamation intended for the Victorian public.

=== The seducer Giacomo Casanova ===
It is possible, according to Anisman, that Thackeray borrowed from the Mémoires de Jacques Casanova, to which Barry refers in chapter IX. The Venetian adventurer Giacomo Casanova is mentioned twice and wrote that he, like Barry, "lived like a philosopher".

== Adaptations ==
Stanley Kubrick adapted the novel into the film Barry Lyndon, released in 1975. Unlike the novel, the film is not narrated by the titular character.

Irish playwright Don McCamphill produced a similar two-hour radio dramatization for the BBC in 2003. It follows the book more closely than Kubrick's film but is more condensed.

== Sources ==
- Anisman, Martin J., ed. (1970). The Luck of Barry Lyndon, A Critical Edition. Introduction and notes by Martin J. Anisman. New York University Press.
- Colby, Robert A. (1966). "Barry Lyndon and the Irish Hero". Nineteenth-Century Fiction. XXI (2): 109–130. doi:10.2307/2932651. JSTOR 2932651.
- Ray, Gordon N. (1952). The Buried Life: A Study of the Relation between Thackeray's Fiction and His Personal History. Harvard University Press.
- Ray, Gordon N. (1955). Thackeray: The Uses of Adversity, 1811-1846. Oxford University Press.
- Stephen, James Fitzjames (27 December 1856). "Compte-rendu de Barry Lyndon". Saturday Review.
- Williams, Ioan M. (1968). Thackeray, Literature in Perspective. London: Evans Brothers.
