= Frederick Mearns =

English footballer (1879–1931)

Fred Mearns
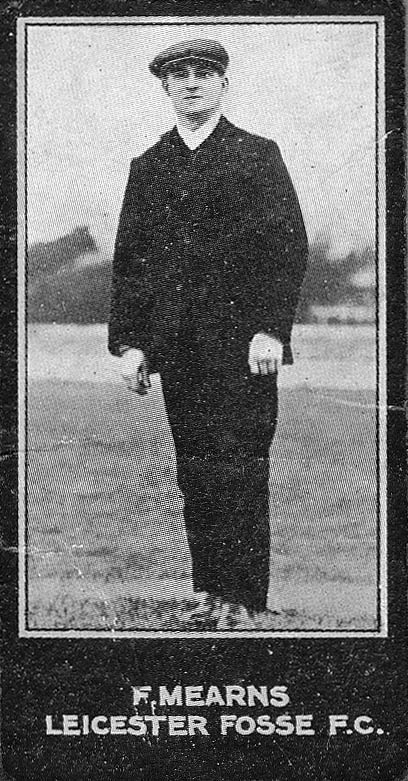

Personal information
- Full name: Frederick Charles Mearns
- Date of birth: 31 March 1879
- Place of birth: Sunderland, England
- Date of death: 22 January 1931 (aged 51)
- Place of death: Sunderland, England
- Position: Goalkeeper

Senior career*
Years	Team	Apps	(Gls)
1901–1902	Sunderland	2	(0)
1902–1903	Kettering Town		
1903–1904	Tottenham Hotspur	5	(0)
1904–1906	Bradford City	21	(0)
- Southern United
- Grays Athletic
- Southern United
1906–1908	Barrow		
1908	Bury		
1908	Stockton		
1908–1909	Hartlepools United	30	(0)
1909–1911	Barnsley		
1911–1913	Leicester Fosse		
1913	Newcastle United		
1919	Sunderland West End		
- * Club domestic league appearances and goals

Frederick Mearns (31 March 1879 – 22 January 1931) was an English footballer who played for Hartlepool United and Barnsley as a goalkeeper. During his time with Barnsley, he was an FA Cup finalist in 1910. Mearns later worked as a trainer for Durham City.

== Club career ==
Tottenham signed Mearns from Kettering Town in March 1903 to be understudy to Charlie Williams. He made his debut on 5 October 1903 for Spurs in a Western League game to Queens Park Rangers where he kept a clean sheet in a 3–0 win. By the end of the season Mearns helped Tottenham to win the Western League. He played a total of five Southern League games, four Western League games and four London League games and then moved onto Bradford City.

He played for Bradford City between June 1904 and May 1906. He made 21 league and 2 FA Cup appearances for the club.

Mearns joined Hartlepool United in 1908 for their inaugural season in the North Eastern League where they came fourth. In the summer of 1909 he joined Barnsley. He played in the Barnsley side who reached the FA Cup in 1910.

== Honours ==
Tottenham Hotspur

- Western Football League: 1903–04

Barnsley

- FA Cup runner-up: 1910

== Bibliography ==
- Soar, Phil (1995). Tottenham Hotspur The Official Illustrated History 1882–1995. Hamlyn. ISBN 0-600-58706-1.
- Goodwin, Bob (1992). The Spurs Alphabet. ACL & Polar Publishing (UK) Ltd. ISBN 0-9514862-8-4.
- Frost, Terry (1988). Bradford City A Complete Record 1903-1988. Breedon Books Sport. ISBN 0-907969-38-0.
