= Harry Wright (footballer, born 1888) =

English footballer

Personal information
- Full name: Harry Fereday Wright
- Date of birth: 12 October 1888
- Place of birth: West Bromwich, England
- Date of death: 1950 (aged 61–62)
- Position: Inside forward

Senior career*
Years	Team	Apps	(Gls)
1904–1905	West Bromwich St Mark's		
1905–1906	Wednesbury Athletic		
1907–1909	West Bromwich Albion	5	(1)
1909–1910	Stourbridge		
1910–1915	West Bromwich Albion	83	(16)
1919–1920	Wolverhampton Wanderers	18	(4)
1920–1921	Newport County	17	(4)
1921	Chesterfield	1	(0)
Total		124	(25)
- * Club domestic league appearances and goals

Harry Fereday Wright (12 October 1888–1950) was an English footballer who played in the Football League for Chesterfield, Newport County, West Bromwich Albion and Wolverhampton Wanderers. Whilst at West Brom, Wright played in the 1912 FA Cup Final where they lost 1–0 to Barnsley.
