= 1911–12 FA Cup =

Tournament details
- Country: England

Final positions
- Champions: Barnsley (1st title)
- Runners-up: West Bromwich Albion

The 1911–12 FA Cup was the 41st season of the world's oldest association football competition, the Football Association Challenge Cup (more usually known as the FA Cup). Barnsley won the competition for the first time, beating West Bromwich Albion 1–0 after extra time in the replay of the final at Bramall Lane in Sheffield, through a goal from Harry Tufnell. The first match, held at Crystal Palace, London, was a 0–0 draw.

Matches were scheduled to be played at the stadium of the team named first on the date specified for each round, which was always a Saturday. If scores were level after 90 minutes had been played, a replay would take place at the stadium of the second-named team later the same week. If the replayed match was drawn further replays would be held at neutral venues until a winner was determined. If scores were level after 90 minutes had been played in a replay, a 30-minute period of extra time would be played.

== Calendar ==
The format of the FA Cup for the season had two preliminary rounds, five qualifying rounds, four proper rounds, and the semi-finals and final.

| Round | Date |
|---|---|
| Extra preliminary round | Saturday 9 September 1911 |
| Preliminary round | Saturday 16 September 1911 |
| First round qualifying | Saturday 30 September 1911 |
| Second round qualifying | Saturday 14 October 1911 |
| Third round qualifying | Saturday 4 November 1911 |
| Fourth round qualifying | Saturday 18 November 1911 |
| Fifth round qualifying | Saturday 2 December 1911 |
| First round proper | Saturday 13 January 1912 |
| Second round proper | Saturday 3 February 1912 |
| Third round proper | Saturday 24 February 1912 |
| Fourth round proper | Saturday 9 March 1912 |
| Semi-finals | Saturday 30 March 1912 |
| Final | Saturday 20 April 1912 |

== Qualifying rounds ==
The Football Association restructured the preliminary rounds of this year's Cup competition to even out the number of clubs entering the tournament at these stages. The extra preliminary round contained more than 100 teams (112) for the first time, while a further 114 clubs joined the 56 winners at the preliminary stage. Crook Town became the first club to progress from the extra preliminary round to the fifth qualifying round, defeating Seaham Villa, Seaham Harbour, Stanley United, West Stanley, Wingate Albion Comrades and Newcastle City along the way before bowing out to Lincoln City.

The 12 winners from the fifth qualifying round were Gainsborough Trinity and Stockport County from the Football League Second Division along with non-league sides Watford, Reading, Walsall, Crewe Alexandra, Lincoln City, Southport Central, Croydon Common, Brentford, Darlington and Sutton Junction (who were appearing in the main draw for the first time and who realised this accomplishment more than 20 years before their fierce crosstown rivals Sutton Town).

== First round proper ==
37 of the 40 clubs from the First and Second divisions joined the 12 clubs who came through the qualifying rounds. The other three sides (Gainsborough, Stockport and Grimsby Town) were entered in the fourth qualifying round. Grimsby lost their one and only match, also to Lincoln City.

Fifteen Southern League sides also received byes to the first round to bring the total number of teams up to 64. These were:

| Southampton Millwall Athletic Queens Park Rangers Crystal Palace Swindon Town | Plymouth Argyle Leyton Portsmouth Northampton Town Bristol Rovers | Norwich City Luton Town West Ham United Brighton & Hove Albion Coventry City |

32 matches were scheduled to be played on Saturday, 13 January 1912. Eight matches were drawn and went to replays on various dates between 16–25 January. The Crewe Alexandra vs Blackpool match then went to a second replay, which was also played on 25 January, at Manchester City's Hyde Road stadium.

| Tie no | Home team | Score | Away team | Date |
|---|---|---|---|---|
| 1 | Birmingham | 0–0 | Barnsley | 13 January 1912 |
| Replay | Barnsley | 3–0 | Birmingham | 22 January 1912 |
| 2 | Darlington | 2–1 | Brighton & Hove Albion | 13 January 1912 |
| 3 | Bury | 2–1 | Millwall Athletic | 13 January 1912 |
| 4 | Liverpool | 1–0 | Leyton | 13 January 1912 |
| 5 | Preston North End | 0–1 | Manchester City | 13 January 1912 |
| 6 | Southampton | 0–2 | Coventry City | 13 January 1912 |
| 7 | Watford | 0–0 | Wolverhampton Wanderers | 13 January 1912 |
| Replay | Wolverhampton Wanderers | 10–0 | Watford | 24 January 1912 |
| 8 | Nottingham Forest | 0–1 | Bradford Park Avenue | 13 January 1912 |
| 9 | Blackburn Rovers | 4–1 | Norwich City | 13 January 1912 |
| 10 | Aston Villa | 6–0 | Walsall | 13 January 1912 |
| 11 | Bolton Wanderers | 1–0 | Woolwich Arsenal | 13 January 1912 |
| 12 | Southport Central | 0–2 | Reading | 13 January 1912 |
| 13 | Crewe Alexandra | 1–1 | Blackpool | 13 January 1912 |
| Replay | Blackpool | 2–2 | Crewe Alexandra | 22 January 1912 |
| Replay | Crewe Alexandra | 1–2 | Blackpool | 25 January 1912 |
| 14 | Middlesbrough | 0–0 | The Wednesday | 13 January 1912 |
| Replay | The Wednesday | 1–2 | Middlesbrough | 25 January 1912 |
| 15 | West Bromwich Albion | 3–0 | Tottenham Hotspur | 13 January 1912 |
| 16 | Sunderland | 3–1 | Plymouth Argyle | 13 January 1912 |
| 17 | Derby County | 3–0 | Newcastle United | 13 January 1912 |
| 18 | Lincoln City | 2–0 | Stockport County | 13 January 1912 |
| 19 | Luton Town | 2–4 | Notts County | 13 January 1912 |
| 20 | Swindon Town | 5–0 | Sutton Junction | 13 January 1912 |
| 21 | Queens Park Rangers | 0–0 | Bradford City | 13 January 1912 |
| Replay | Bradford City | 4–0 | Queens Park Rangers | 18 January 1912 |
| 22 | Fulham | 2–1 | Burnley | 13 January 1912 |
| 23 | Brentford | 0–0 | Crystal Palace | 13 January 1912 |
| Replay | Crystal Palace | 4–0 | Brentford | 17 January 1912 |
| 24 | Bristol Rovers | 1–2 | Portsmouth | 13 January 1912 |
| 25 | Northampton Town | 1–0 | Bristol City | 13 January 1912 |
| 26 | West Ham United | 2–1 | Gainsborough Trinity | 13 January 1912 |
| 27 | Manchester United | 3–1 | Huddersfield Town | 13 January 1912 |
| 28 | Leeds City | 1–0 | Glossop | 13 January 1912 |
| 29 | Clapton Orient | 1–2 | Everton | 13 January 1912 |
| 30 | Oldham Athletic | 1–1 | Hull City | 13 January 1912 |
| Replay | Hull City | 0–1 | Oldham Athletic | 16 January 1912 |
| 31 | Chelsea | 1–0 | Sheffield United | 13 January 1912 |
| 32 | Croydon Common | 2–2 | Leicester Fosse | 13 January 1912 |
| Replay | Leicester Fosse | 6–1 | Croydon Common | 22 January 1912 |

== Second round proper ==
The sixteen second-round matches were played on Saturday, 3 February 1912. Five matches were drawn, with the replays taking place in the following midweek fixture.

| Tie no | Home team | Score | Away team | Date |
|---|---|---|---|---|
| 1 | Darlington | 1–1 | Northampton Town | 3 February 1912 |
| Replay | Northampton Town | 2–0 | Darlington | 8 February 1912 |
| 2 | Aston Villa | 1–1 | Reading | 3 February 1912 |
| Replay | Reading | 1–0 | Aston Villa | 7 February 1912 |
| 3 | Bolton Wanderers | 1–0 | Blackpool | 3 February 1912 |
| 4 | Wolverhampton Wanderers | 2–1 | Lincoln City | 3 February 1912 |
| 5 | Middlesbrough | 1–1 | West Ham United | 3 February 1912 |
| Replay | West Ham United | 2–1 | Middlesbrough | 8 February 1912 |
| 6 | Derby County | 1–2 | Blackburn Rovers | 3 February 1912 |
| 7 | Everton | 1–1 | Bury | 3 February 1912 |
| Replay | Everton | 6–0 | Bury | 8 February 1912 |
| 8 | Swindon Town | 2–0 | Notts County | 3 February 1912 |
| 9 | Manchester City | 0–1 | Oldham Athletic | 3 February 1912 |
| 10 | Fulham | 3–0 | Liverpool | 3 February 1912 |
| 11 | Barnsley | 1–0 | Leicester Fosse | 3 February 1912 |
| 12 | Coventry City | 1–5 | Manchester United | 3 February 1912 |
| 13 | Bradford City | 2–0 | Chelsea | 3 February 1912 |
| 14 | Leeds City | 0–1 | West Bromwich Albion | 3 February 1912 |
| 15 | Crystal Palace | 0–0 | Sunderland | 3 February 1912 |
| Replay | Sunderland | 1–0 | Crystal Palace | 7 February 1912 |
| 16 | Bradford Park Avenue | 2–0 | Portsmouth | 3 February 1912 |

== Third round proper ==
The eight third-round matches were scheduled for Saturday, 24 February 1912. There were two replays, played in the following midweek fixture.

| Tie no | Home team | Score | Away team | Date |
|---|---|---|---|---|
| 1 | Reading | 1–1 | Manchester United | 24 February 1912 |
| Replay | Manchester United | 3–0 | Reading | 29 February 1912 |
| 2 | Blackburn Rovers | 3–2 | Wolverhampton Wanderers | 24 February 1912 |
| 3 | Bolton Wanderers | 1–2 | Barnsley | 24 February 1912 |
| 4 | Sunderland | 1–2 | West Bromwich Albion | 24 February 1912 |
| 5 | Fulham | 2–1 | Northampton Town | 24 February 1912 |
| 6 | West Ham United | 1–1 | Swindon Town | 24 February 1912 |
| Replay | Swindon Town | 4–0 | West Ham United | 28 February 1912 |
| 7 | Oldham Athletic | 0–2 | Everton | 24 February 1912 |
| 8 | Bradford Park Avenue | 0–1 | Bradford City | 24 February 1912 |

== Fourth round proper ==
The four quarter final matches were scheduled for Saturday, 9 March 1912. There were two replays, played in the following midweek fixture. Barnsley and Bradford City went to a second replay the next week, and then to a third replay three days later, with these games being played at Elland Road and Bramall Lane respectively.

| Tie no | Home team | Score | Away team | Date |
|---|---|---|---|---|
| 1 | West Bromwich Albion | 3–0 | Fulham | 9 March 1912 |
| 2 | Swindon Town | 2–1 | Everton | 9 March 1912 |
| 3 | Barnsley | 0–0 | Bradford City | 9 March 1912 |
| Replay | Bradford City | 0–0 | Barnsley | 13 March 1912 |
| Replay | Barnsley | 0–0 | Bradford City | 18 March 1912 |
| Replay | Barnsley | 3–2 | Bradford City | 21 March 1912 |
| 4 | Manchester United | 1–1 | Blackburn Rovers | 9 March 1912 |
| Replay | Blackburn Rovers | 4–2 | Manchester United | 14 March 1912 |

== Semi-finals ==
The semi-final matches were played on Saturday, 30 March 1912. Both matches went to replays, which West Bromwich Albion and Barnsley won, going on to meet each other in the final.

30 March 1912
15:00

| West Bromwich Albion | 0–0 | Blackburn Rovers |

Anfield, Liverpool

Replay

3 April 1912
19:45

| West Bromwich Albion | 1–0 | Blackburn Rovers |

Hillsborough, Sheffield

30 March 1912
15:00

| Barnsley | 0–0 | Swindon Town |

Stamford Bridge, London

Replay

3 April 1912
19:45

| Barnsley | 1–0 | Swindon Town |

Meadow Lane, Nottingham

== Final ==
The Final was contested by Barnsley and West Bromwich Albion. It took two matches to determine a winner. The first took place at Crystal Palace on 20 April 1912 and the second on 24 April at Bramall Lane. Barnsley won the replay 1–0 after extra time, through a single goal from Harry Tufnell.

=== Match details ===
20 April 1912
15:00 BST

| Barnsley | 0–0 | West Bromwich Albion |

Crystal Palace
Attendance: 54,434
Referee: J.R. Schumacher

| Barnsley | West Bromwich Albion |

==== Replay ====
24 April 1912
15:00 BST

| Barnsley | 1–0 (a.e.t.) | West Bromwich Albion |
|---|---|---|
| Tufnell 118' |

Bramall Lane, Sheffield
Attendance: 38,555
Referee: J.R. Schumacher

| Barnsley | West Bromwich Albion |

== See also ==
- FA Cup Final Results 1872-
