= Arthur Cook (footballer) =

English footballer

Personal information
- Full name: Arthur Fredrick Cook
- Date of birth: 1889
- Place of birth: Stafford, England
- Date of death: 1930 (aged 40–41)
- Height: 5 ft 9 in (1.75 m)
- Position: Defender

Senior career*
Years	Team	Apps	(Gls)
1908	Old Wesleyans		
1909	Stafford Rangers		
1910	Wrexham		
1911–1921	West Bromwich Albion	38	(0)
1921	Luton Town	0	(0)
1922–1923	Swansea Town	17	(0)
1923	Whitchurch		
Total		55	(0)
- * Club domestic league appearances and goals

Arthur Fredrick Cook (1889 – 1930) was an English footballer who played as a defender in the Football League for Swansea Town and West Bromwich Albion. Cook guested for Stoke in 1918–19, making five appearances.

== Career statistics ==
Appearances and goals by club, season and competition
Club	Season	League			FA Cup		Total	
Club	Season	Division	Apps	Goals	Apps	Goals	Apps	Goals
West Bromwich Albion	1911–12	First Division	12	0	8	0	20	0
West Bromwich Albion	1912–13	First Division	8	0	3	0	11	0
West Bromwich Albion	1913–14	First Division	4	0	0	0	4	0
West Bromwich Albion	1914–15	First Division	0	0	0	0	0	0
West Bromwich Albion	1919–20	First Division	7	0	0	0	7	0
West Bromwich Albion	1920–21	First Division	4	0	1	0	5	0
West Bromwich Albion	1921–22	First Division	3	0	0	0	3	0
Swansea Town	1922–23	Third Division South	17	0	0	0	17	0
Career total			55	0	12	0	67	0
