= Harry Tufnell =

English footballer and manager

Personal information
- Full name: Henry Tufnell
- Date of birth: 1886
- Place of birth: Burton upon Trent, England
- Date of death: 27 December 1959 (aged 72–73)
- Place of death: Oldham, England
- Height: 5 ft 7 1/2 in (1.71 m)
- Position: Inside forward

Senior career*
Years	Team	Apps	(Gls)
1906–1907	Worcester City		(13)
–1909	Bury		
1909–1920	Barnsley	199	(61)

Managerial career
- 1920–1921: Emley
- 1921–1922: Doncaster Rovers
- * Club domestic league appearances and goals

Henry Tufnell (1886 – 27 December 1959) was an English professional footballer who played for Bury and Barnsley prior to the First World War as an inside forward. Following the end of his playing career he managed and coached several clubs in the North of England.

== Club career ==
Harry Tufnell played for Worcester City during the 1906–07 season. Later he joined Bury, and then Barnsley at the beginning of the 1909–10 season. He was part of the Barnsley side that contested both the 1910 and the 1912 FA Cup Finals. He scored in both finals. In 1910, he scored the only Barnsley goal, putting the ball in off the post from a Wilfred Bartrop cross. The game ended a 1–1 draw. Barnsley then lost the replay 2–0. In 1912 the first match ended in 0–0 draw and the replay looked to be going the same way when Tufnell scored in the last few minutes of extra time after a solo run from the halfway line.

In total he scored 71 league and FA Cup goals for Barnsley in 128 games.

== Coaching career ==
When he retired from playing he stayed in the game, managing Emley and Doncaster Rovers and then on the training staff at Oldham Athletic.

== Life outside football ==
Prior to starting his career in football he worked as a greengrocer's assistant and in the later part of his life he worked in a cotton mill.

== Honours ==
Barnsley

- FA Cup: winners 1912; runners-up 1910

== External sources ==
- Short biography of Harry Tufnell
