= Jesse Foot =

English surgeon and writer (1743–1826)

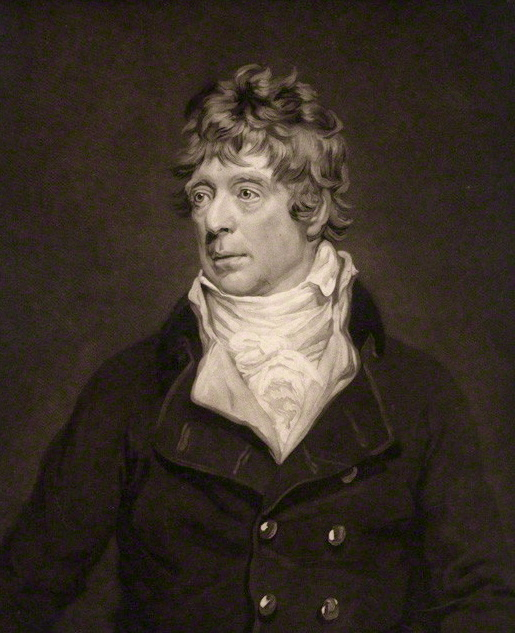
Jesse Foot by John Opie

Jesse Foot (1743 – 26 October 1826) was an English surgeon and biographer.

== Life ==
Foot was born at Charlton, Wiltshire, in 1743, and baptised there 22 November 1743 He received a medical education in London, becoming a member of the Surgeons' Company, and about 1766 went to the West Indies, where he practised for three years in the island of Nevis, returning in 1769. After this he went to St. Petersburg, where he became a practitioner of the College of St. Petersburg, as he afterwards described himself.

Returning to England, Foot was appointed house-surgeon to the Middlesex Hospital, and on the conclusion of his term of office began practice in London, in Salisbury Street, Strand, later moving to Dean Street, Soho. He died at Ilfracombe, North Devon, on 27 October 1826.

== Works ==
Foot wrote a slanted Life of John Hunter. He was also the biographer of Andrew Robinson Stoney (Bowes) and his wife, Mary Eleanor Bowes, Countess of Strathmore, who were his patients; and of Arthur Murphy, a friend. He was an anti-abolitionist, in favour of the West Indian planters, and wrote a Defence of them. He attacked William Wilberforce and the abolition activists.

Foot wrote:

- A Critical Inquiry into the Ancient and Modern Manner of Treating Diseases of the Urethra, and an Improved Method of Cure, London, 1774; 6th edn. 1811.
- Observations on the New Opinions of John Hunter in his Treatise on the Venereal Disease, in three parts, 1786–7.
- An Essay on the Bite of a Mad Dog, with Observations on John Hunter's Treatment of the Case of Master R—— [Rowley], and also a Recital of the Successful Treatment of Two Cases, 1788; 2nd edn. 1791.
- A New Discovered Fact of a relative nature in the Venereal Poison, 1790.
- A Defence of the Planters in the West Indies, comprised in Four Arguments, &c., 1792.
- A Complete Treatise on the Origin, Theory, and Cure of the Lues Venerea and Obstruction in the Urethra, illustrated by a great variety of Cases, being a course of twenty-three lectures read in Dean Street, Soho, 1790 and 1791; 1792; new edn, 1820; German translation, Leipzig, 1793–4.
- A Plan for Preventing the Fatal Effects of the Bite of a Mad Dog, with Cases, 1792.
- Life of John Hunter, 1794; 2nd edn. 1797.
- Dialogues between a Pupil of the late John Hunter and Jesse Foot, including passages in Darwin's "Zoonomia", 1795.
- Cases of the Successful Practice of the Vesicæ Lotura in the Cure of Diseased Bladders, pt. i. 1798, pt. ii. 1803.
- Observations principally upon the Speech of Mr. Wilberforce on his Motion in the House of Commons, 30 May 1804, for the Abolition of the Slave Trade, 1805.
- Important Researches upon the Existence, Nature, and Consummation of Venereal Infection in Pregnant Women, New-born Infants, and Nurses, by the late P. S. O. Mahon, contrasted with the Opinions of the late John Hunter upon the subject, 1808.
- The Lives of Andrew Robinson Bowes, Esq., and the Countess of Strathmore, written from thirty-three years' professional attendance, from Letters and other well-authenticated Documents, 1810.
- Life of Arthur Murphy, Esq., 1811.
- Review of Everard Home's Observations on the Diseases of the Prostate Gland, 1812.
- Facts relative to the Prevention of Hydrophobia,’ in 'Medical Facts and Observations, iii. 33.
- Two Letters on the Necessity of a Public Inquiry into Cause of the Death of the Princess Charlotte and her Infant, 1817.

See also for minor contributions Index to the London Medical and Physical Journal, vols i–xl, 1820.

== Family ==
Jesse Foot (1780–1850), surgeon, was the nephew of the preceding. He practised for many years as a surgeon at Clarendon, Jamaica, returned home about 1819, and lived with his uncle in Dean Street, Soho, for two years, marrying Miss Foot (presumably his cousin) on 4 September 1819. He succeeded to his uncle's practice, and in 1826 brought out a new edition of his work on the urethra, which is described as the eighth edition. He became surgeon to the Royal Westminster Ophthalmic Hospital. He published Ophthalmic Memoranda, 1838, and wrote papers in The Lancet and the London Medical and Surgical Journal, enumerated in Amédée Dechambre, Dictionnaire encyclopédique des sciences médicales. In 1834, he published The Medical Pocket-book for 1835. Foot died at Ilfracombe, aged 70, on 5 January 1850.
