= Hubert Pearson =

English footballer

Personal information
- Full name: Hubert Pryer Pearson
- Date of birth: 15 May 1886
- Place of birth: Kettlebrook, Tamworth, England
- Date of death: October 1955 (aged 69)
- Place of death: Tamworth, England
- Height: 6 ft 0 in (1.83 m)
- Position: Goalkeeper

Youth career
- Kettlebrook Oakfield
- Tamworth Castle
- Tamworth Athletic

Senior career*
Years	Team	Apps	(Gls)
1907–1925	West Bromwich Albion	341	(2)

International career
	Football League	2	(0)
- * Club domestic league appearances and goals

Hubert Pryer Pearson (15 May 1886 – October 1955) was an English professional footballer who played as a goalkeeper for West Bromwich Albion.

== Career ==
=== Club career ===
Pearson participated in the 1912 FA Cup Final. He spent his entire professional career, spanning 18 years, with West Bromwich Albion.

=== International career ===
Pearson was once selected for the English national squad at the age of 37, but didn't appear due to injury.

== Personal life ==
Pearson was the father of Harold Pearson, and the uncle of Harry Hibbs and Horace Pearson.

== Honours ==
West Bromwich Albion

- FA Cup finalists: 1912
