= Sid Bowser =

English footballer

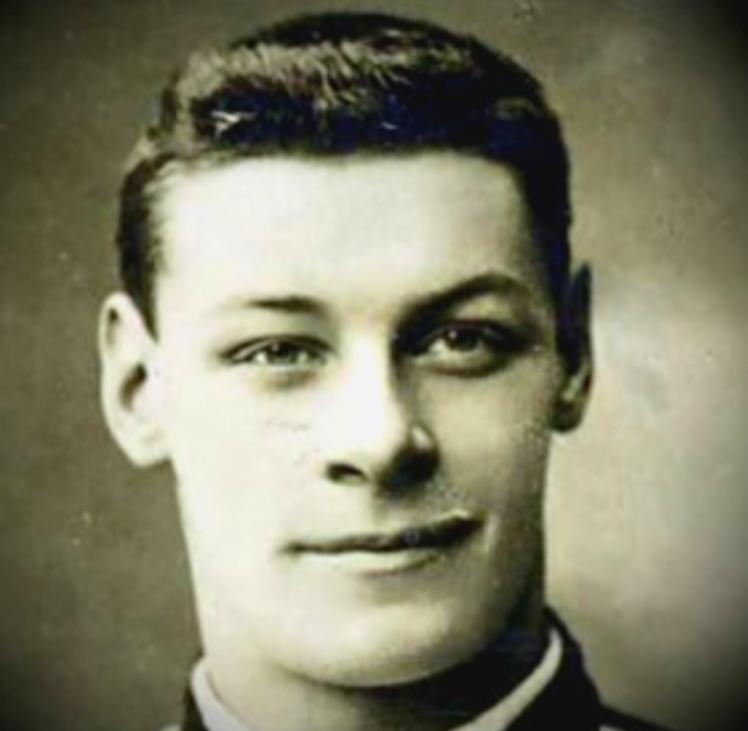

Personal information
- Full name: Sidney Bowser
- Date of birth: 6 April 1891
- Place of birth: Handsworth, Birmingham, England
- Date of death: 10 February 1961 (aged 69)
- Place of death: Birmingham, England
- Height: 5 ft 9 in (1.75 m)
- Positions: Inside left; centre half

Senior career*
Years	Team	Apps	(Gls)
1908–1913	West Bromwich Albion	123	(44)
1913–1914	Distillery		
1914–1924	West Bromwich Albion	218	(20)
1924–1927	Walsall	27	(0)

International career
1919	England	1	(0)
- * Club domestic league appearances and goals

Sidney Bowser (6 April 1891 – 10 February 1961), better known as Sid Bowser, was an English footballer who played at inside-left and centre-half.

== Career ==
Bowser was born in Handsworth, Birmingham. He joined West Bromwich Albion in July 1908 and remained with the club for five years. He moved to Belfast Distillery in April 1913, but re-joined Albion the following February. Bowser guested for Stoke in 1918–19, making ten appearances scoring five goals. He signed for Walsall in August 1924 before retiring in May 1927. He died in Birmingham in 1961.

== Career statistics ==
Appearances and goals by club, season and competition
Club	Season	League			FA Cup		Total	
Club	Season	Division	Apps	Goals	Apps	Goals	Apps	Goals
West Bromwich Albion	1908–09	Second Division	4	2	2	0	6	2
West Bromwich Albion	1909–10	Second Division	22	6	4	0	26	6
West Bromwich Albion	1910–11	Second Division	38	22	2	2	40	24
West Bromwich Albion	1911–12	First Division	27	8	7	4	34	12
West Bromwich Albion	1912–13	First Division	32	6	3	1	35	7
West Bromwich Albion	1913–14	First Division	13	0	1	1	14	1
West Bromwich Albion	1914–15	First Division	35	1	1	0	36	1
West Bromwich Albion	1919–20	First Division	41	10	1	0	42	10
West Bromwich Albion	1920–21	First Division	40	5	1	0	41	5
West Bromwich Albion	1921–22	First Division	30	0	1	0	31	0
West Bromwich Albion	1922–23	First Division	42	1	4	0	46	1
West Bromwich Albion	1923–24	First Division	17	2	1	0	18	2
Walsall	1924–25	Third Division North	27	0	1	0	28	0
Career total			368	64	29	8	397	72
