= Wilfred Bartrop =

English footballer

Wilf Bartrop
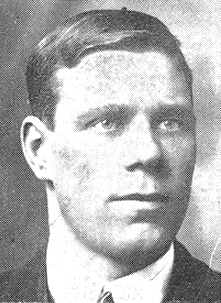

Personal information
- Full name: Wilfred Bartrop
- Date of birth: 22 November 1887
- Place of birth: Worksop, England
- Date of death: 7 November 1918 (aged 30)
- Place of death: Escaut, Belgium
- Position: Outside forward

Senior career*
Years	Team	Apps	(Gls)
1908–1909	Worksop	?	(?)
1909–1914	Barnsley	160	(15)
1914–1915	Liverpool	3	(0)
- * Club domestic league appearances and goals

Wilf Bartrop (22 November 1887 – 7 November 1918) was a professional footballer, who played as a forward for several English sides prior to the First World War. He was killed in action, days before the end of the war.

== Club career ==
He started his career at home side Worksop before transferring to Barnsley on 21 June 1909. He played in both FA Cup finals that Barnsley reached in 1910 and 1912. In the 1910 FA Cup, Bartrop scored a 'wonder goal' in a 1–0 quarter-final win over Queen's Park Rangers. In the final, Barnsley lost the replay 2–0 to Newcastle, after a 1–1 draw in the first tie. The 1912 cup final went again to a replay but Barnsley won, defeating West Bromwich Albion 1–0 in extra time, after a 0–0 draw in the first encounter. Many newspapers, including the Manchester Guardian, praised his play in the replay.

At the end of the 1913–14 season he transferred to Liverpool where he played a total of 3 games before his career was interrupted by the First World War.

A biography of Wilfred Bartrop, entitled 'Swifter than the Arrow', was published in December 2008.

== Honours ==
Barnsley

- FA Cup: Winners 1912

His FA Cup winners medal was sold in 2008 for £14400 – more than twice its estimate price.

== Military service ==
He joined the Royal Field Artillery as a Gunner in a Trench Mortar Battery. He was serving in Belgium when his unit came under heavy artillery fire at the river Escaut on 7 November 1918. Bartrop was severely wounded in the legs and chest by an airburst and died of wounds seconds later. His death took place 4 days before the armistice.

The opening display in an exhibition on Football and the Great War at the National Football Museum, Manchester, UK (2014 to 2015) focused on Wilfred Bartrop. The display included photographs, archive film footage and memorabilia including Bartrop's FA Cup winner's medal.
