= Hobson, County Durham =

Village in County Durham, United Kingdom

Coordinates: 54.896°N 1.729°W

Hobson is a village in County Durham, in England. It is situated to the south of Burnopfield, north of Stanley and Annfield Plain.

Hobson was a pit village, the colliery was named Burnopfield Colliery and was sunk in 1742 and closed in 1968.

Among the village's attractions are the Hobson Hotel, Hobson Industrial Estate and Hobson Golf Club.
