= Tom Forman (footballer) =

English footballer

Personal information
- Full name: Thomas Forman
- Date of birth: 26 October 1879
- Place of birth: Basford, Nottingham, England
- Position: Outside left

Senior career*
Years	Team	Apps	(Gls)
1900–1902	Nottingham Forest	5	(0)
1903	Manchester City	0	(0)
–1907	Sutton Town		
1907–1910	Barnsley	126	(16)
1910–1911	Tottenham Hotspur	8	(1)
- Sutton Junction
- * Club domestic league appearances and goals

Thomas Forman (26 October 1879 – after 1911) was a professional footballer who played for Nottingham Forest, Manchester City, Sutton Town, Barnsley, Tottenham Hotspur and Sutton Junction.

== Career ==
Forman began his career at Nottingham Forest where he played in five matches between 1900 and 1902.

In 1903 he joined Manchester City without playing a first team match.

After a spell with non-League club Sutton United the outside left signed for Barnsley. Between 1907 and 1910, Forman appeared in 136 games and found the net on 18 occasions for the Yorkshire club; he appeared in both matches of the 1910 FA Cup Final in which he collected a losers' medal.

In 1910 he joined Tottenham Hotspur, featuring in a further eight matches and scoring a single goal before ending his career at Sutton Town. His solitary goal on his Lilywhites debut in a 6-2 victory over Middlesbrough at White Hart Lane in February 1911 in the old First Division.

== Personal life ==
Forman served as a lance bombardier in the Royal Garrison Artillery during the First World War.
