= Eli Turner =

English footballer

Personal information
- Full name: Eli Fearn Turner
- Date of birth: 1893
- Place of birth: Stoke-on-Trent, England
- Date of death: 1937 (aged 43–44)
- Height: 5 ft 9 in (1.75 m)
- Position: Wing half

Senior career*
Years	Team	Apps	(Gls)
1912–1913	Stoke St Peter's		
1913–1914	Milton Brotherhood		
1914–1915	Kidsgrove Wellington		
1921–1927	Crewe Alexandra	206	(6)
1927	Oswestry Town		
1927	Runcorn		
Total		206	(6)
- * Club domestic league appearances and goals

Eli Fearn Turner (1893–1937) was an English footballer who played in the Football League for Crewe Alexandra. Turner guested for Stoke during World War I.

== Career statistics ==
Appearances and goals by club, season and competition
Club	Season	League			FA Cup		Total	
Club	Season	Division	Apps	Goals	Apps	Goals	Apps	Goals
Crewe Alexandra	1921–22	Third Division North	31	3	3	0	34	3
Crewe Alexandra	1922–23	Third Division North	37	2	2	0	39	2
Crewe Alexandra	1923–24	Third Division North	41	0	1	0	42	0
Crewe Alexandra	1924–25	Third Division North	40	0	2	0	42	0
Crewe Alexandra	1925–26	Third Division North	36	0	4	0	40	0
Crewe Alexandra	1926–27	Third Division North	21	1	3	0	24	1
Career total			206	6	15	0	221	6
