= James Freney =

Irish highwayman (c. 1719–1788)

- Born: c. 1719; County Kilkenny, Ireland
- Died: 20 December 1788 (age 69); New Ross, Ireland
- Occupation: Highwayman
- Spouse: Anne Freney
- Parent(s): John Freney; Alice Phelan

Captain James Freney (c. 1719–1788) was an 18th-century Irish highwayman and memoirist, who remains a popular anti-hero in Irish folklore. To enthusiasts of Victorian era English literature and modern costume dramas, Captain Freney is particularly significant for his fictionalized appearances in the novel The Luck of Barry Lyndon by William Makepeace Thackery and its 1975 film adaptation by director Stanley Kubrick.

== Early life ==
James Freney was a native of County Kilkenny, and was descended from a respectable Old English noble family who had been wealthy and powerful since the 13th century, having their seat at Ballyreddy Castle. But during the Cromwellian conquest of Ireland they lost their estates and were reduced to poverty.

His father, John Freney, was a household servant for Anglo-Irish landlord Joseph Robbins at Ballyduff, Thomastown. In 1718 he married Robbins's housemaid, Alice Phelan, and their son James was born the following year at Alice's father's home at Inistioge.

He received a good education locally, including tuition in the Robbins household—and in 1742 moved to Waterford where he opened a pub with his wife Anne.

== Criminal career ==
Unable to pay the exorbitant fees charged by the town corporation, the couple closed up their pub and moved back to Thomastown. Here, Freney fell in with the Kellymount highway gang, led by fellow Thomastown man John Reddy. Their colleagues would in time number Richard Dooling, John Anderson, Felix Donnelly, James Bolger, Michael Millea, John Reddy, George Roberts, Edmond Kenny, James Larrassy and a man called Hackett.

Proclaimed an outlaw in January 1748 (old calendar), Freney surrendered in April 1749. Joseph Robbins's brother, a lawyer, and Lord Carrick helped Freney work out a deal with the chief justices in which Freney would be allowed to emigrate. It is believed this deal was procured because the authorities feared executing him would make him a folk hero and lead to further disturbances.

The rest of the Kellymount band were not so lucky. Bolger, Kenny, Larrassy, Millea, Reddy, Hackett, Dooling and Roberts all went to the gallows. Reddy was imprisoned while Donnelly escaped to England but was eventually hanged in Kilkenny.

== Later life ==
His autobiography, The Life and Adventures of Mr James Freney, was a huge success upon its publication in 1754.

== Death ==
It is not known where or how long he was abroad, if at all, but by 1776 he had settled at the port of New Ross, County Wexford and worked as a customs official, a post he held until his death on 20 December 1788. He was buried in Inistioge.

Local landmarks named after him include Freney's Rock and Freney's Well.

== In popular culture ==
- James Freney is the anti-hero of The Ballad of the Bold Captain.
- William Makepeace Thackeray, in reading his published memoirs, delighted in Freney's "noble naïveté and simplicity of the hero as he recounts his own adventures". For this reason, Thackeray included Freney in the novel The Luck of Barry Lyndon, where he has Barry encounter and be politely robbed by Captain Freney while travelling upon the highway.
- The same incident also appears in Stanley Kubrick's 1975 film adaptation of Thackery's novel as Barry Lyndon. In Kubrick's film, however, Redmond Barry addresses the man who is about to rob him and who is played by actor Arthur O'Sullivan, by the slightly altered name of "Captain James Feeney".

== Works ==
- The Life and Adventures of James Freney, commonly called Captain Freney (Dublin: S. Powell 1754), 146pp.; Do., (Dublin: C.M. Warren 1861); reprinted as The Life and Adventures of James Freney, Together with an Account of the Actions of Several other Highwaymen ([n. pub]: 1900; 1981), 130pp.[Reproduction of original published in 1861 by C. M. Warren, Dublin; from microfilm of original in National Library of Ireland. Label on title page reads : "This autobiography of James Freney, the legendary "Robinhood of Ireland", ...]; Frank McEvoy, ed., Life and Adventures of James Freney (Kilkenny: Hebron 1988), 84pp. ill. by David Holohan.

== Sources ==
- W. M. Thackeray [as ‘M. A. Titmarsh’], The Irish Sketch Book [first edn. 1842], ed. John A. Gamble (Belfast: Blackstaff 1985), pp. 163–79.
- Samuel Carter Hall & Anna Maria Hall, Ireland: Its Scenery, Character, etc. 3 vols. (London: Hall, Virtue & Co. 1841–43), 8o.; reprinted as Hall's Ireland: Mr & Mrs Hall's Tour of 1840, ed. Michael Scott, 2 vols., London: Sphere 1984), 1984 edn. Vol. 2, p. 426.
- Mary Campbell, review of Life and Adventures of James Freney, ed. Frank McEvoy (Kilkenny: Hebron 1988), in Books Ireland, No.159 (May 1992), pp. 96–97.
- Oxford Companion to Irish History, edited S.J. Connolly, Oxford, 1999.
- Niall Ó Ciosáin, ‘Freney, James (died 1788)’, first published Sept 2004, 320 words, Oxford University Press.
