= Bob Pailor =

English footballer

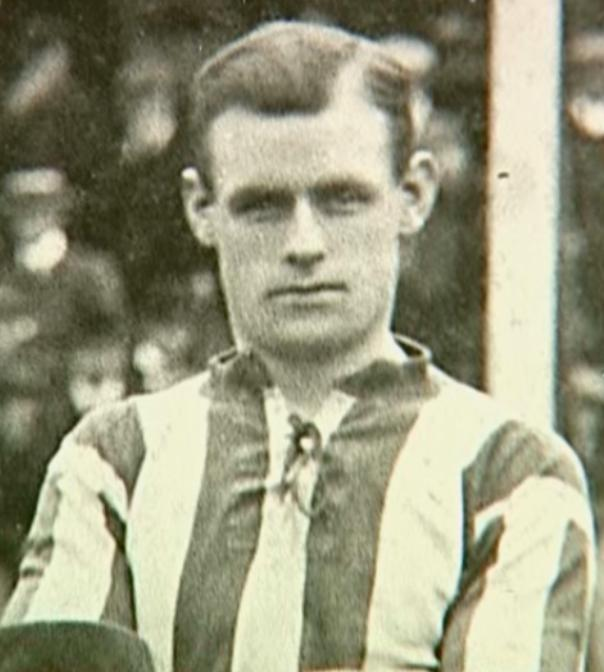

Personal information
- Full name: Robert Pailor
- Date of birth: 7 July 1887
- Place of birth: Stockton-on-Tees, England
- Date of death: 24 January 1976 (aged 88)
- Place of death: Hartlepool, England
- Position: Centre-forward

Senior career*
Years	Team	Apps	(Gls)
1908–1914	West Bromwich Albion		
1914–1915	Newcastle United		
- * Club domestic league appearances and goals

Robert Pailor (7 July 1887 – 24 January 1976), was an English footballer who played as a centre-forward.

== Biography ==
Pailor was born in Stockton-on-Tees. He turned professional with West Bromwich Albion in October 1908, making his debut in January 1909 in a Division Two match against Bradford Park Avenue. In May 1914 he joined Newcastle United for a £1,550 fee, but retired from football just twelve months later due to a kidney complaint. He died in Hartlepool in 1976.

== Sources ==
- Matthews, Tony (2005). The Who's Who of West Bromwich Albion. Breedon Books. p. 170. ISBN 1-85983-474-4.
