= Claude Jephcott =

English professional footballer (1890–1950)

Personal information
- Full name: Allan Claud Jephcott
- Date of birth: 31 October 1890
- Place of birth: Smethwick, England
- Date of death: 5 October 1950 (aged 59)
- Place of death: Penn, England
- Height: 5 ft 8 in (1.73 m)
- Position: Outside right

Senior career*
| Years | Team | Apps | (Gls) |
- Brierley Hill Alliance
| 1911–1923 | West Bromwich Albion | 174 | (15) |
- → Birmingham City (war guest)
| 1918 | → Lincoln City (war guest) | 1 | (0) |
| Total | | 175 | (15) |
- * Club domestic league appearances and goals

Allan Claud Jephcott (31 October 1890 – 5 October 1950) was an English professional footballer who played as an outside right.

== Career ==
Born in Smethwick, Jephcott moved from Brierley Hill Alliance to West Bromwich Albion in April 1911, signing for a fee of £100. He retired in May 1923, having made 189 appearances for the club in all competitions. He was a war guest for Lincoln City in 1918, making one appearance, and he also guested for Birmingham City, one of five West Bromwich Albion players to do so during World War I.

He made two representative appearances for the Football League, one in 1914 against the Scottish League and one in 1919 against the Irish League.
