= Tom Holford =

English footballer and manager (1878–1964)

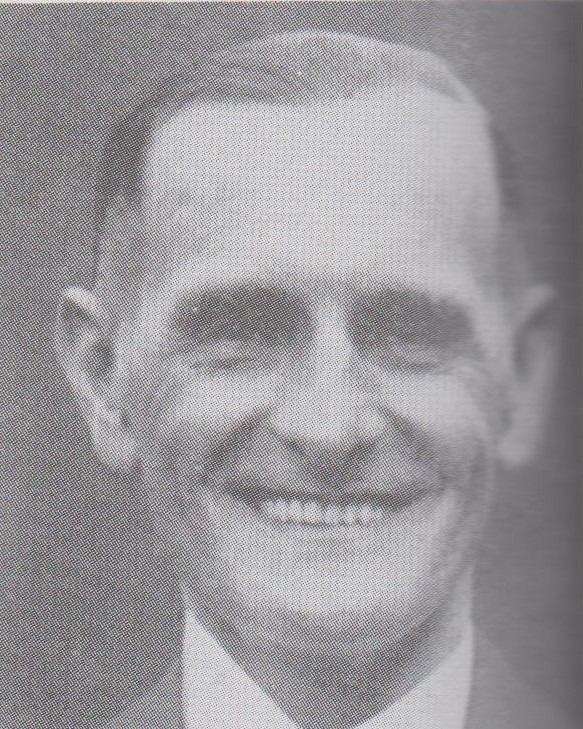
- Holford, in his first spell at charge at Port Vale

Personal information
- Full name: Thomas Holford
- Date of birth: 22 February 1878
- Place of birth: Hanley, England
- Date of death: 6 April 1964 (aged 86)
- Place of death: Blurton, Stoke-on-Trent, England
- Height: 5 ft 5 in (1.65 m)
- Position: Wing-half

Youth career
- Cobridge

Senior career*
Years	Team	Apps	(Gls)
1898–1908	Stoke	248	(30)
1908–1914	Manchester City	172	(28)
1914–1924	Port Vale	56	(1)
Total		476	(59)

International career
1903	England	1	(0)

Managerial career
- 1914–1918: Port Vale (player-manager)
- 1932–1935: Port Vale
- * Club domestic league appearances and goals

Thomas Holford (22 February 1878 – 6 April 1964) was an English footballer who played for Stoke, Manchester City, Port Vale and the England national team. His primary position was wing-half. Still, he played in many different positions throughout his career. He later managed Port Vale on two separate occasions, serving throughout World War I, before three years from 1932 to 1935. He also served the club for many years as a trainer and a scout. In 1924, he turned out for the Vale at 46 years and 68 days, making him one of the oldest players in the English Football League.

== Early and personal life ==
Thomas Holford was born on 22 February 1878 in Hanley. He was the fifth of six children to Thomas Henry and Anna Davis (née Edwards), a potter's manager and potter's sponger respectively. He worked in the pottery industry from at least 1891 to 1921. He married Sarah Jane Platt in 1903, and the couple had two daughters, Lily and Annie. Holford was a cousin of fellow footballer Wilf Kirkham.

== Club career ==
Holford in his playing days.

=== Stoke ===
Holford started his career with Granville's Night School and Cobridge before he moved on to one of the two local league clubs; Stoke in 1899. He "did not put a foot wrong" in his first seasons at the club before establishing himself as the centre of Stoke's half-back line between James Bradley and George Baddeley following Alf Wood's departure in March 1901. For the next ten seasons Holford was a near ever-present in the Stoke team, racking up 105 consecutive appearances from March 1903 to March 1906. His good performances won him an England cap in 1903 and he is considered the smallest centre-back ever to play for England at just 5 ft 5. During Holford's time at the club he played the game in a fiery style, although he was never sent off. He succeeded George Baddeley as captain in 1905. Holford's manager Horace Austerberry described him as "an excellent passer of the ball and one who played every match as if it was his last". In 1908, Stoke went bust and dropped out of the English Football League and played in the Birmingham League. Holford was too good to be lost to non-League football, so he had to leave his hometown club, for which he played nearly 270 games.

=== Manchester City ===
In April 1908, he signed for First Division Manchester City, making his debut on 21 April against Bristol City, a match which finished goalless. In his first full season at the club he made 27 appearances and was the club's second-highest goalscorer with 15 goals, which included three hat-tricks. However, Manchester City finished second-bottom in the First Division, and Holford again suffered relegation. Holford won a Second Division championship medal in the 1909–10 season as his club immediately returned to the top flight. Though he had been an ever-present in 1912–13, Holford lost his place in the first-team in the 1913–14 season, making all but three of his 15 appearances in the first ten weeks of the season. He made his last appearance for Manchester City on 13 April 1914 against Newcastle United, giving him a final total of 183 appearances and 38 goals for the club.

=== Port Vale ===
Upon leaving Manchester, he joined Port Vale back in the Potteries as player-manager. He led the side to a North Staffordshire Infirmary Cup victory in 1915. Still, two years later, he was conscripted into the army to serve as a gunner in the Royal Garrison Artillery. After playing his part in World War I, as well as guesting for Nottingham Forest and Newcastle United, he returned to Vale in the summer of 1919. Regaining his place, he helped the club to win the Staffordshire Senior Cup and share the North Staffordshire Infirmary Cup in 1920. Due to his age, he hardly played after October 1920, but played his part in the club's 1922 North Staffordshire Infirmary Cup achievement.

He retired as a player at the end of the 1922–23 season. Over his full career Holford played 474 league games, an exceptionally large number for the period, he had played everywhere except in goal. Upon his retirement, he became a trainer for Port Vale, only to make his final appearance on 5 April 1924 at a club record age of 46 years and 68 days.

== International career ==
He won his only England cap on 14 February 1903, in a 4–0 win over Ireland at Molineux.

== Style of play ==
Holford was nicknamed "Dirty Tommy" due to his sometimes reckless tackling. He was also regarded as an excellent passer of the ball.

== Managerial career ==
He had two spells as manager of Port Vale, the first as player-manager from 1914 to 1918 when he was player-manager. The club won the 1915 North Staffordshire Infirmary Cup. His second appointment came in June 1932, with the club in the Second Division. He signed wingers Bob Morton and Jimmy McGrath, and led the Vale to a club record 9–1 victory over Chesterfield on 24 September. After top scorer Stewart Littlewood picked up an injury, he signed ex-England international Louis Page as a replacement; and also boosted the club's defence by signing Len Armitage. In January 1933, he sold left-back Jimmy Oakes to Charlton Athletic for £3,000. His team finished four points above relegation in 1932–33, and he released Billy Easton, Louis Page, Stewart Littlewood, Tom Tippett, Jock Leckie, and Ben Davies, whilst Wilf Kirkham retired.

He signed players such as Trevor Rhodes, Jack Vickers, Ken Gunn, and Billy Tabram, the result of which was an eighth-place finish in 1933–34 – then a record best for the "Valiants". However, "the end of an era" followed, as players such as Bill Cope, Sydney Dickinson, Len Armitage, Billy Tabram, Fred Mills, George Poyser, and Jimmy McGrath departed.

In preparation for the 1934–35 campaign, Holford signed goalkeeper John Potts, 'outstanding' outside-right John Friar, inside-left David Galloway, and centre-half Joe Craven. After a good start, results tailed off into a scrap against relegation, and Vale ended up fifth from bottom. Leaving the club in summer 1935 were: James Baker, Bob Morton, Jack Blackwell, Joe Craven, Galloway, Ted Critchley, and Jack Round. He prepared for the 1935–36 season by signing striker George Stabb, centre-half Harry Griffiths, left-winger Arthur Caldwell, left-back Roderick Welsh, and right-half Michael Curley. However, he was relieved of his post in September 1935 so that he could concentrate his efforts on scouting. He retired as a scout in 1950, having also been a trainer at the club from July 1939 to July 1946.

== Career statistics ==
=== Club ===
Appearances and goals by club, season and competition
Club	Season	League			FA Cup		Total	
Club	Season	Division	Apps	Goals	Apps	Goals	Apps	Goals
Stoke	1898–99	First Division	5	0	0	0	5	0
Stoke	1899–1900	First Division	7	1	0	0	7	1
Stoke	1900–01	First Division	6	0	1	0	7	0
Stoke	1901–02	First Division	29	3	4	0	33	3
Stoke	1902–03	First Division	33	2	4	0	37	2
Stoke	1903–04	First Division	34	3	1	0	35	3
Stoke	1904–05	First Division	34	2	2	0	36	2
Stoke	1905–06	First Division	36	2	2	0	38	2
Stoke	1906–07	First Division	35	5	1	0	36	5
Stoke	1907–08	Second Division	29	12	6	3	35	15
Stoke	Total		248	30	21	3	269	33
Manchester City	1907–08	First Division	2	0	0	0	2	0
Manchester City	1908–09	First Division	26	12	1	3	27	15
Manchester City	1909–10	Second Division	30	12	4	1	34	13
Manchester City	1910–11	First Division	29	2	2	0	31	2
Manchester City	1911–12	First Division	32	2	2	0	34	2
Manchester City	1912–13	First Division	38	0	2	0	40	0
Manchester City	1913–14	First Division	15	0	0	0	15	0
Manchester City	Total		172	28	11	4	183	32
Port Vale	1919–20	Second Division	26	0	0	0	26	0
Port Vale	1920–21	Second Division	23	1	1	0	24	1
Port Vale	1921–22	Second Division	5	0	1	0	6	0
Port Vale	1922–23	Second Division	0	0	0	0	0	0
Port Vale	1923–24	Second Division	2	0	0	0	2	0
Port Vale	Total		56	1	2	0	58	1
Career total			476	59	34	7	510	66

=== International ===
National team	Year	Apps	Goals
England	1903	1	0
Total		1	0

=== Managerial ===
Managerial record by team and tenure
Team	From	To	Record				
Team	From	To	P	W	D	L	Win %
Port Vale	1 June 1932	30 September 1935	137	47	31	59	34.3

== Honours ==
=== As a player ===
Manchester City

- Football League Second Division: 1909–10

Port Vale

- North Staffordshire Infirmary Cup: 1920 (shared), 1922 (shared)
- Staffordshire Senior Cup: 1920

England

- British Home Championship: 1902–03 (shared)

=== As a manager ===
Port Vale

- North Staffordshire Infirmary Cup: 1915
