= Usherwood =

Usherwood is a surname. Notable people with the surname include:

- Arthur Usherwood (1884–1961), English footballer
- Keith Usherwood Ingold (1929–2023), British-Canadian chemist
- Les Usherwood, English artist
- Thomas Usherwood (1841–1939), Archdeacon of Maritzburg
