= John Friar =

Scottish footballer

Personal information
- Full name: John Friar
- Date of birth: 18 July 1911
- Place of birth: Cambusnethan, Scotland
- Date of death: 22 May 1979 (aged 67)
- Place of death: Bathgate, Scotland
- Height: 5 ft 9 in (1.75 m)
- Position: Right winger

Youth career
- Carluke Rovers

Senior career*
Years	Team	Apps	(Gls)
1929–1931	Bradford City	0	(0)
1931–1932	Hibernian	25	(11)
1932–1933	Portsmouth	1	(1)
1933–1934	Bournemouth & Boscombe Athletic	34	(11)
1934	Port Vale	18	(10)
1934–1936	Preston North End	26	(8)
1936–1939	Norwich City	82	(18)
1939	Ipswich Town	0	(0)
Total		186	(59)
- * Club domestic league appearances and goals

John Friar (18 July 1911 – 22 May 1979) was a Scottish footballer who played on the right-wing. He represented Carluke Rovers, Bradford City, Hibernian, Portsmouth, Bournemouth & Boscombe Athletic, Port Vale, Preston North End, Norwich City, and Ipswich Town.

== Career ==
Friar played for Carluke Rovers and Bradford City, before joining Hibernian. He made his debut on 8 August 1931, in a 1–0 win over Alloa Athletic at Easter Road, and scored his first goal for "Hibs" ten days later in a 3–1 win over Arbroath. He scored a total of 11 goals in 25 Second Division appearances in the 1931–32 season. He moved back to England in April 1932 when he signed with Portsmouth. In 1933, he and Jack Surtees were traded to Bournemouth & Boscombe Athletic, with Len Williams moving in the opposite direction. He joined Port Vale in July 1934 and scored on his debut on 25 August, a 2–0 win over Sheffield United at the Old Recreation Ground. He went on to score braces in home wins over Southampton, Manchester United and Bury, and boasted a total of ten goals in the opening 18 Second Division games of the season. This record led him to be snapped up by First Division side Preston North End in December 1934, in exchange for Ted Critchley and a cash balance. He later played for Norwich City and Ipswich Town.

== Career statistics ==
Appearances and goals by club, season and competition
Club	Season	League			National cup (Note: Includes FA Cup, Scottish Cup)		Other		Total	
Club	Season	Division	Apps	Goals	Apps	Goals	Apps	Goals	Apps	Goals
Bradford City	1929–30	Second Division	0	0	0	0	0	0	0	0
Hibernian	1931–32	Scottish Division One	25	11	0	0	0	0	25	11
Portsmouth	1932–33	First Division	1	1	0	0	0	0	1	1
Bournemouth & Boscombe Athletic	1933–34	Third Division South	34	11	2	0	2	2	38	13
Port Vale	1934–35	Second Division	18	10	0	0	0	0	18	10
Preston North End	1934–35	First Division	23	8	6	1	0	0	29	9
Preston North End	1935–36	First Division	3	0	0	0	0	0	3	0
Preston North End	Total		26	8	6	1	0	0	32	9
Norwich City	1935–36	Second Division	12	2	2	0	0	0	14	2
Norwich City	1936–37	Second Division	13	3	0	0	0	0	13	3
Norwich City	1937–38	Second Division	34	10	1	0	0	0	35	10
Norwich City	1938–39	Second Division	23	3	1	0	0	0	24	3
Norwich City	Total		82	18	4	0	0	0	86	18
Ipswich Town	1939–40		0	0	0	0	0	0	0	0
Career total			186	59	12	1	2	2	200	62
