= David Galloway (footballer) =

Scottish footballer

Personal information
- Full name: David Wilson Galloway
- Date of birth: 6 May 1905
- Place of birth: Kirkcaldy, Scotland
- Date of death: 1979
- Place of death: Preston, England
- Height: 5 ft 6 in (1.68 m)
- Position: Inside left

Youth career
- Wellesley Juniors

Senior career*
Years	Team	Apps	(Gls)
- Raith Rovers
1931–1932	Aberdeen	14	(1)
1932–1934	Preston North End	31	(1)
1934–1935	Port Vale	12	(0)
1935–1938	Carlisle United	109	(11)
1938–1939	Clapton Orient	2	(0)
1939–1940	Tunbridge Wells Rangers		
Total		166+	(13+)
- * Club domestic league appearances and goals

David Wilson Galloway (6 May 1905 – 1979) was a Scottish footballer who played at inside-left for Raith Rovers, Aberdeen, Preston North End, Port Vale, Carlisle United, Clapton Orient, and Tunbridge Wells Rangers.

== Career ==
Galloway played for Wellesley Juniors and Raith Rovers before featuring 14 times in the First Division for Aberdeen in the 1931–32 season. He then left the Pittodrie Stadium and moved south to join the English Football League club Preston North End. He transferred to Port Vale in June 1934. After starting as a regular for the 1934–35 season, he lost his place in October 1934 and was released at the end of the season with just 12 Second Division appearances to his name at the Old Recreation Ground. He moved on to Carlisle United, Clapton Orient, and Tunbridge Wells Rangers.

== Career statistics ==
Appearances and goals by club, season and competition
Club	Season	League			FA Cup		Other		Total	
Club	Season	Division	Apps	Goals	Apps	Goals	Apps	Goals	Apps	Goals
Preston North End	1932–33	Second Division	20	0	0	0	0	0	20	0
Preston North End	1933–34	Second Division	11	1	0	0	0	0	11	1
Preston North End	Total		31	1	0	0	0	0	31	1
Port Vale	1934–35	Second Division	12	0	0	0	0	0	12	0
Carlisle United	1935–36	Third Division North	38	4	1	0	3	3	42	7
Carlisle United	1936–37	Third Division North	42	5	3	0	3	0	48	5
Carlisle United	1937–38	Third Division North	29	2	1	0	2	0	32	2
Carlisle United	Total		109	11	5	0	8	3	122	14
Clapton Orient	1938–39	Third Division South	2	0	0	0	0	0	2	0
