= Isaiah Turner =

Isaiah Turner may refer to:

- Isaiah Turner (footballer)
- Isaiah Turner (entrepreneur)
