= Albert Titley =

English footballer

Personal information
- Full name: Albert Titley
- Date of birth: 18 November 1911
- Place of birth: Middleport, Staffordshire, England
- Date of death: 17 September 1986 (aged 74)
- Place of death: Stoke-on-Trent, England
- Position: Winger

Youth career
- Leek Alexandra

Senior career*
Years	Team	Apps	(Gls)
1933–1934	West Bromwich Albion	0	(0)
1934–1935	Port Vale	4	(0)
1935–1936	Macclesfield Town	41	(16)
Total		45	(16)
- * Club domestic league appearances and goals

Albert Titley (18 November 1918 – 17 September 1986) was an English footballer who played for West Bromwich Albion, Port Vale, and Macclesfield Town in the 1930s.

== Career ==
Titley played for Leek Alexandra and West Bromwich Albion before joining Port Vale in May 1934. After making his debut in place of Bob Morton on 24 November; in a 2–1 defeat by Hull City at the Old Recreation Ground, he played the next three Second Division games before being given a free transfer to Macclesfield Town in May 1935, at the end of the 1934–35 season. He missed just one game of the 1935–36 Cheshire County League season, scoring 16 goals.

== Career statistics ==
Appearances and goals by club, season and competition
Club	Season	League			FA Cup		Other		Total	
Club	Season	Division	Apps	Goals	Apps	Goals	Apps	Goals	Apps	Goals
West Bromwich Albion	1933–34	First Division	0	0	0	0	0	0	0	0
Port Vale	1934–35	Second Division	4	0	0	0	0	0	4	0
Macclesfield Town	1935–36	Cheshire County League	41	16	1	1	9	2	51	19
Career total			45	16	1	1	9	2	55	19
