= Jack Round =

English footballer

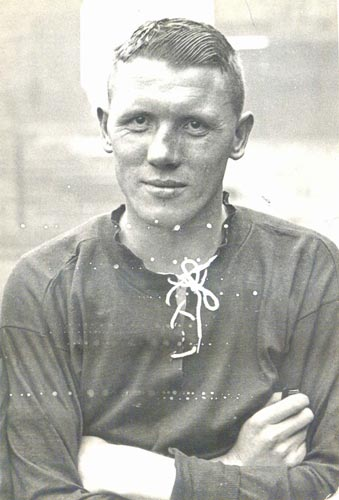

Personal information
- Full name: John Henry Round
- Date of birth: 20 May 1903
- Place of birth: Brierley Hill, England
- Date of death: 31 December 1936 (aged 33)
- Place of death: Carlisle, England
- Height: 6 ft 1 1/2 in (1.87 m)
- Position: Centre-half

Youth career
- Brierley Hill Alliance
- Cradley Heath

Senior career*
Years	Team	Apps	(Gls)
1925–1930	Bolton Wanderers	56	(1)
1930–1935	Port Vale	128	(5)
1935–1936	Carlisle United	37	(0)
Total		221	(6)
- * Club domestic league appearances and goals

John Henry Round (20 May 1903 – 31 December 1936) was an English footballer who played in the Football League for Bolton Wanderers, Port Vale and Carlisle United in the 1920s and 1930s.

== Career ==
Round played for Brierley Hill Alliance, Cradley Heath and Bolton Wanderers before joining Port Vale in September 1930. He played 38 Second Division and two FA Cup games in the 1930–31 season, as Vale posted a club record high finish of fifth in the Second Division. He scored three goals in 30 league games in the 1931–32 season, before making 31 appearances in the 1932–33 campaign. However, he appeared just three times at the Old Recreation Ground in the 1933–34 season, and was released at the end of the 1934–35 season. He then moved on to Carlisle United, helping them to a 13th-place finish in the Third Division North in 1935–36, before he died on New Year's Eve in 1936.

== Career statistics ==
Appearances and goals by club, season and competition
Club	Season	League			FA Cup		N/S Cup		Total	
Club	Season	Division	Apps	Goals	Apps	Goals	Apps	Goals	Apps	Goals
Bolton Wanderers	1925–26	First Division	10	0	1	0	—		11	0
Bolton Wanderers	1926–27	First Division	5	0	0	0	—		5	0
Bolton Wanderers	1927–28	First Division	21	1	2	1	—		23	2
Bolton Wanderers	1928–29	First Division	13	0	0	0	—		13	0
Bolton Wanderers	1929–30	First Division	7	0	0	0	—		7	0
Bolton Wanderers	Total		56	1	3	1	0	0	59	2
Port Vale	1930–31	Second Division	38	2	2	0	—		40	2
Port Vale	1931–32	Second Division	30	3	2	0	—		32	3
Port Vale	1932–33	Second Division	31	0	0	0	—		31	0
Port Vale	1933–34	Second Division	3	0	0	0	—		3	0
Port Vale	1934–35	Second Division	26	0	1	0	—		27	0
Port Vale	Total		128	5	5	0	0	0	133	5
Carlisle United	1935–36	Third Division North	28	0	1	0	2	1	31	1
Carlisle United	1936–37	Third Division North	9	0	1	0	0	0	10	0
Carlisle United	Total		37	0	2	0	2	1	41	1
Career total			221	6	10	1	2	1	233	8
