= 1904–05 Stoke F.C. season =

Stoke
1904–05 season
- Chairman: Mr W Cowlishaw
- Manager: Horace Austerberry
- Stadium: Victoria Ground
- Football League First Division: 12th (30 Points)
- FA Cup: Second Round
- Top goalscorer: League: Fred Rouse (12); All: Fred Rouse (12)
- Highest home attendance: 12,000 vs Newcastle United (22 October 1904)
- Lowest home attendance: 4,000 vs Everton (8 April 1905)
- Average home league attendance: 7,470
Home colours

The 1904–05 season was Stoke's 16th season in the Football League.

There was no relegation worries for Stoke this season due to the First Division being expanded to 20 clubs for the 1905–06 campaign. Stoke struggled for consistency and finished in a mid-table position of 12th after picking up 30 points.

== Season review ==
=== League ===
The summer of 1904 saw a further exodus of players, including Arthur Capes who left for Bristol City and Leigh Richmond Roose who went to Everton. There was now a distinct lack of quality players available within the club and with these two major departures, the now despondent Stoke supporters saw very little hope of improvement out on the pitch. Tom Holford took over captaincy whilst Jack Whitley arrived as first choice 'keeper from Everton.

James Sheridan an Irish International forward also came in from Everton, but never fitted in at the Victoria Ground although he did win an Ireland cap whilst at Stoke becoming the clubs first capped Irishman. Jack Hall another recruit signed from Newark, in October 1904 and his seven goals were only exceeded by Fred Rouse who was top scorer with 12. Not being able to field a settled forward line was a major problem for manager Horace Austerberry and 12th place in the division was the final outcome in an inconsistent season.

=== FA Cup ===
Stoke went out of this season FA Cup in the second round after being well beaten 4–0 at home to Everton.

== Final league table ==
Pos	Team	Pld	W	D	L	GF	GA	GAv	Pts
10	Woolwich Arsenal	34	12	9	13	36	40	0.900	33
11	Derby County	34	12	8	14	37	48	0.771	32
12	Stoke	34	13	4	17	40	58	0.690	30
13	Blackburn Rovers	34	11	5	18	40	51	0.784	27
14	Wolverhampton Wanderers	34	11	4	19	47	73	0.644	26

Source: World Football
Rules for classification: 1) Points; 2) Goal average; 3) Goals scored

== Results ==
Stoke's score comes first

=== Legend ===
Win	Draw	Loss

=== Football League First Division ===
Match	Date	Opponent	Venue	Result	Attendance	Scorers
1	1 September 1904	Derby County	H	1–2	10,000	Haworth
2	3 September 1904	Aston Villa	A	0–3	25,000	
3	10 September 1904	Manchester City	H	1–0	13,000	Rouse
4	17 September 1904	Blackburn Rovers	A	0–4	10,000	
5	24 September 1904	Notts County	H	0–2	8,000	
6	1 October 1904	Nottingham Forest	A	1–0	10,000	Whitehouse
7	8 October 1904	Sheffield United	H	2–1	10,000	Groves (o.g.), Hall
8	15 October 1904	The Wednesday	A	0–3	15,000	
9	22 October 1904	Newcastle United	H	1–0	12,000	Hall
10	29 October 1904	Sunderland	A	1–3	12,000	Rouse
11	5 November 1904	Preston North End	H	1–1	6,000	Rouse
12	12 November 1904	Woolwich Arsenal	A	1–2	20,000	Whitehouse
13	19 November 1904	Middlesbrough	H	3–1	6,000	Rouse (2), Hall
14	26 November 1904	Derby County	A	0–3	6,000	
15	3 December 1904	Wolverhampton Wanderers	H	2–1	8,000	Sheridan, Betteley (o.g.)
16	10 December 1904	Everton	A	1–4	9,000	Hall
17	17 December 1904	Bury	A	1–3	7,000	Pitt
18	26 December 1904	Sheffield United	A	2–5	8,000	Groves (o.g.), Hesham
19	31 December 1904	Aston Villa	H	1–4	9,000	Hall
20	7 January 1905	Manchester City	A	0–1	14,000	
21	14 January 1905	Blackburn Rovers	H	4–0	6,000	Holford, Rouse, Usherwood, Gallimore
22	21 January 1905	Notts County	A	0–0	8,000	
23	28 January 1905	Nottingham Forest	H	0–0	8,000	
24	11 February 1905	The Wednesday	H	2–1	7,500	Fielding (2)
25	25 February 1905	Sunderland	H	1–3	5,000	Hall
26	11 March 1905	Woolwich Arsenal	H	2–0	6,000	Hall, Rouse
27	18 March 1905	Middlesbrough	A	1–2	8,000	Rouse
28	1 April 1905	Wolverhampton Wanderers	A	3–1	4,000	Rouse (2), Holdcroft
29	8 April 1905	Everton	H	2–2	4,000	Holdcroft, Balmer (o.g.)
30	10 April 1905	Preston North End	A	1–2	8,000	Fielding
31	15 April 1905	Bury	H	2–0	8,000	Fielding, Holdcroft
32	21 April 1905	Newcastle United	A	1–4	10,000	Hall
33	22 April 1905	Small Heath	A	1–0	12,000	Holford (pen)
34	29 April 1905	Small Heath	H	1–0	4,000	Haines

=== FA Cup ===
Round	Date	Opponent	Venue	Result	Attendance	Scorers
R1	4 February 1905	Grimsby Town	H	2–0	11,000	Godley, Baddeley
R2	18 February 1905	Everton	H	0–4	25,700	

== Squad statistics ==
Pos.	Name	League		FA Cup		Total	
Pos.	Name	Apps	Goals	Apps	Goals	Apps	Goals
GK	(England) Jack Benton	2	0	0	0	2	0
GK	(England) Jack Whitley	32	0	2	0	34	0
FB	(England) Harry Benson	25	0	2	0	27	0
FB	(England) Charlie Burgess	15	0	0	0	15	0
FB	(England) Arthur Hartshorne	23	0	2	0	25	0
FB	(Wales) Sam Meredith	5	0	0	0	5	0
HB	(England) George Baddeley	34	0	2	1	36	1
HB	(England) James Bradley	25	0	2	0	27	0
HB	(England) Tom Holford	34	2	2	0	36	2
HB	(England) Albert Sturgess	9	0	0	0	9	0
FW	(England) Horace Brindley	4	0	0	0	4	0
FW	(England) George Brown	8	0	0	0	8	0
FW	(England) Tom Coxon	4	0	0	0	4	0
FW	(England) Ross Fielding	11	3	2	0	13	3
FW	(England) Edwin Freeman	0	0	0	0	0	0
FW	(England) George Gallimore	9	1	2	0	11	1
FW	(England) Bill Godley	2	0	1	1	3	1
FW	(England) Wilf Haines	3	1	0	0	3	1
FW	(England) Jack Hall	25	7	0	0	25	7
FW	(England) Jack Haworth	2	1	0	0	2	1
FW	(England) Frank Hesham	17	1	0	0	17	1
FW	(England) Ted Holdcroft	14	3	1	0	15	3
FW	(England) Arthur Leonard	4	0	0	0	4	0
FW	(England) Albert Pitt	3	1	0	0	3	1
FW	(England) Fred Rouse	30	12	2	0	32	12
FW	James Sheridan	12	1	0	0	12	1
FW	(England) Arthur Usherwood	6	1	0	0	6	1
FW	(England) Frank Whitehouse	16	2	2	0	18	2
FW	(England) Bob Whittingham	0	0	0	0	0	0
–	Own goals	–	4	–	0	–	4
