= 1907–08 Stoke F.C. season =

Stoke
1907–08 season
- Chairman: Mr W Cowlishaw
- Manager: Horace Austerberry
- Stadium: Victoria Ground
- Football League Second Division: 10th (37 Points)
- FA Cup: Fourth Round
- Top goalscorer: League: Tom Holford (12); All: Tom Holford (15)
- Highest home attendance: 12,000 vs Oldham Athletic (7 September 1907)
- Lowest home attendance: 1,500 vs Leicester Fosse (27 April 1908)
- Average home league attendance: 5,825
Home colours

The 1907–08 season was Stoke's 19th season in the Football League and first in the Second Division.

Stoke now playing in the Second Division failed to mount a promotion challenge and finished in 10th place. However that was the least of Stoke's worries as financial problems dominated the season and ended with the club being put into liquidation and thus had to resign from the Football League. At long last local feeling was roused and attempts were made to raise £2,000 to take over the club, its buildings and remaining assets. Twelve local burghers stepped forward guided by Alfred Barker a former league referee and supporter of the club.

A new board of seven directors was formed and in June 1908 re-branded the club as Stoke Football Club (1908). Barker's impressive efforts led to Stoke being included for re-election but lost out to Tottenham Hotspur and their exit from the Football League was sealed. Barker placed Stoke in the Birmingham & District League for the 1908–09 season.

== Season review ==
=== League ===
The 1907–08 season saw Stoke playing in the Second Division for the first time and they started their fixture programme disastrously, collecting just one point from their opening four games. They quickly dropped into the bottom two and although they picked up and eventually finished 10th, their highest spot throughout the campaign but generally it was not a good season. The Victoria Ground faithful witnessed only a few worthwhile performances, the best being a couple of 5–0 victories over Gainsborough Trinity and Grimsby Town and a 6–1 beating of Fulham. Newspaper reports described that win over Fulham as one of the best attacking displays by a Stoke side so far.

=== FA Cup ===
Stoke had a good run in the cup soundly beating Lincoln City 5–0, Gainsborough Trinity after three attempts and Portsmouth before losing to eventual winners Wolverhampton Wanderers in front of 31,800.

=== Football League exit ===
Finance was now a major problem within the club and following that cup exit to Wolves in February 1908 the fans deserted the team and crowds plummeted alarmingly. Only 2,000 bothered to turn up to see Barnsley beaten 4–0 and the takings at the gate amounted to just £40. It was now common knowledge that the books would not balance as wages repeatedly exceeded the poor gates receipts. Before the end of the season Tom Holford was sold to Manchester City as the directors turned to players to generate income. Only a few players with any real ability stayed with the club as Stoke's squad was sold off. Chairman Cowlishaw's last-ditch efforts to rally support failed and he immediately pulled Stoke out of the league, putting the company into liquidation. Cowlishaw left by stating: "The Potteries public do not deserve a football club if this is the way they show their support".

At long last local feeling was roused and attempts were made to raise £2,000 to take over the club, its buildings and remaining assets. Twelve local burghers stepped forward guided by Alfred Barker a former league referee and supporter of the club. A new board of seven directors was formed and in June 1908 re-branded the club as Stoke Football Club (1908). Barker's impressive efforts led to Stoke being included for re-election but lost out Tottenham Hotspur and their exit from the Football League was confirmed. Barker placed Stoke in the Birmingham & District League for the 1908–09 season.

== Final league table ==
Pos	Team	Pld	W	D	L	GF	GA	GAv	Pts	Promotion or relegation
8	Hull City	38	21	4	13	73	62	1.177	46	
9	Wolverhampton Wanderers	38	15	7	16	50	45	1.111	37	
10	Stoke (R)	38	16	5	17	57	52	1.096	37	Resigned from the league
11	Gainsborough Trinity	38	14	7	17	47	71	0.662	35	
12	Leeds City	38	12	8	18	53	65	0.815	32	

(R) Relegated

== Results ==
Stoke's score comes first

=== Legend ===
Win	Draw	Loss

=== Football League Second Division ===
Match	Date	Opponent	Venue	Result	Attendance	Scorers
1	2 September 1907	Chesterfield Town	H	1–1	3,000	Watkins
2	7 September 1907	Oldham Athletic	H	1–3	12,000	Watkins
3	9 September 1907	Burnley	A	1–3	7,000	Gallimore
4	14 September 1907	Clapton Orient	A	0–3	5,000	
5	21 September 1907	Leeds City	H	2–1	10,000	Chalmers, Sturgess
6	28 September 1907	Wolverhampton Wanderers	A	0–2	9,000	
7	5 October 1907	Gainsborough Trinity	H	5–0	5,000	Fielding, Holford (2), Watkins, Gemmell
8	12 October 1907	Stockport County	A	2–1	6,000	Holford, Watkins
9	19 October 1907	Glossop	H	4–0	7,000	Holford, Fielding, Gemmell, Baddeley
10	26 October 1907	Leicester Fosse	A	0–1	18,000	
11	2 November 1907	Blackpool	H	3–1	7,000	Holford, Baddeley (2)
12	9 November 1907	Grimsby Town	A	0–1	4,000	
13	11 November 1907	Clapton Orient	H	3–0	5,000	Holford (2), Baddeley
14	16 November 1907	West Bromwich Albion	A	0–1	10,000	
15	23 November 1907	Bradford City	H	3–0	8,000	Baddeley, Holford, Gallimore
16	30 November 1907	Hull City	A	1–2	7,000	Holford
17	7 December 1907	Derby County	H	0–3	6,000	
18	14 December 1907	Lincoln City	A	2–1	500	Brown, Arrowsmith
19	21 December 1907	Fulham	H	6–1	6,000	Brown (3), Baddeley, Gallimore, Coxon
20	26 December 1907	Burnley	H	0–0	10,000	
21	28 December 1907	Barnsley	A	1–0	2,000	Gallimore
22	4 January 1908	Oldham Athletic	A	1–3	10,000	Brown
23	18 January 1908	Leeds City	A	1–0	10,000	Baddeley
24	25 January 1908	Wolverhampton Wanderers	H	0–0	6,000	
25	8 February 1908	Stockport County	H	1–0	5,000	Williams
26	15 February 1908	Glossop	A	0–2	1,000	
27	29 February 1908	Blackpool	A	0–1	4,000	
28	14 March 1908	West Bromwich Albion	H	1–1	5,000	Gallimore
29	19 March 1908	Grimsby Town	H	5–0	3,000	Gallimore, Holford (2), Davies (2)
30	21 March 1908	Bradford City	A	0–6	15,000	
31	28 March 1908	Hull City	H	1–1	2,500	Brown
32	4 April 1908	Derby County	A	0–3	7,000	
33	11 April 1908	Lincoln City	H	3–0	2,000	Holford, Baddeley, Owen
34	17 April 1908	Gainsborough Trinity	A	0–2	6,000	
35	18 April 1908	Fulham	A	1–5	15,000	Brown
36	20 April 1908	Chesterfield Town	A	4–2	3,000	Brown, Baddeley, Chalmers (2)
37	25 April 1908	Barnsley	H	4–0	1,800	Baddeley, Owen (3)
38	27 April 1908	Leicester Fosse	H	0–1	1,500	

=== FA Cup ===
Round	Date	Opponent	Venue	Result	Attendance	Scorers
R1	11 January 1908	Lincoln City	H	5–0	7,413	Gallimore (2), Brown, Holford, Wilson (o.g.)
R2	1 February 1908	Gainsborough Trinity	H	1–1	6,400	Baddeley (pen)
R2 Replay	5 February 1908	Gainsborough Trinity	A	2–2 (aet)	6,000	Brown, Bentley
R2 Second Replay	10 February 1908	Gainsborough Trinity	N	3–1	5,000	Brown, Holford, Watkins
R3	22 February 1908	Portsmouth	A	1–0	20,000	Holford
R4	7 March 1908	Wolverhampton Wanderers	A	0–1	31,800	

== Squad statistics ==
Pos.	Name	League		FA Cup		Total	
Pos.	Name	Apps	Goals	Apps	Goals	Apps	Goals
GK	(England) Arthur Box	33	0	6	0	39	0
GK	(England) Fred Rathbone	2	0	0	0	2	0
GK	(Wales) Leigh Richmond Roose	3	0	0	0	3	0
FB	(England) Charlie Burgess	37	0	6	0	43	0
FB	(England) William Cope	25	0	6	0	31	0
FB	(England) Ernest Mullineux	13	0	0	0	13	0
FB	(England) Harry Smith	1	0	0	0	1	0
HB	(England) George Baddeley	37	4	6	1	43	5
HB	(England) Sam Baddeley	1	0	0	0	1	0
HB	(England) Frank Bentley	1	0	4	1	5	1
HB	(England) Joe Brough	1	0	0	0	1	0
HB	(Wales) Lloyd Davies	2	0	0	0	2	0
HB	(England) Walter Rogers	1	0	0	0	1	0
HB	(England) Albert Sturgess	37	1	6	0	43	1
HB	(England) Louis Williams	33	1	3	0	36	1
FW	(England) Arthur Arrowsmith	7	1	4	0	11	1
FW	(England) Amos Baddeley	15	6	0	0	15	6
FW	(England) Freddie Brown	19	8	6	3	25	11
FW	(Scotland) Jackie Chalmers	9	3	0	0	9	3
FW	(England) Tom Coxon	9	1	3	0	12	1
FW	(England) William Davies	10	2	0	0	10	2
FW	(England) Ross Fielding	27	2	1	0	28	2
FW	(England) George Gallimore	24	6	5	2	29	8
FW	(Scotland) Jimmy Gemmell	11	2	0	0	11	2
FW	(England) Arthur Griffiths	4	0	1	0	5	0
FW	(England) Tom Holford	29	12	6	3	35	15
FW	(Scotland) James Morton	0	0	0	0	0	0
FW	(England) Syd Owen	5	4	0	0	5	4
FW	(Wales) Mart Watkins	17	4	3	1	20	5
FW	(England) Bill Williamson	5	0	0	0	5	0
–	Own goals	–	0	–	1	–	1
