= James Groves =

James Groves may refer to:

- James Groves (footballer) (1883–1939), English footballer
- James Grimble Groves (1854–1914), British brewer and politician
- James M. Groves, American politician
- James Walton Groves, Canadian mycologist
- J. Alan Groves (1952–2007), Hebrew Bible scholar
