= Jack Haworth =

English footballer

Personal information
- Full name: John Haworth
- Date of birth: 9 March 1883
- Place of birth: Nelson, England
- Date of death: 1955 (aged 71–72)
- Place of death: England
- Position: Centre-forward

Senior career*
Years	Team	Apps	(Gls)
1902	Colne		
1903–1904	Stoke	6	(2)
1905	Netherfield		
1906	Darwen Institute		
- * Club domestic league appearances and goals

John Haworth (9 March 1883 – 1955) was an English footballer who played in the Football League for Stoke.

== Career ==
Haworth played amateur football with Colne racking up an impressive number of goals which led to Football League side Stoke signing him in 1903. However, he was never able to break into the first team and made six appearances scoring twice before joining Netherfield.

== Career statistics ==
Appearances and goals by club, season and competition
Club	Season	League			FA Cup		Total	
Club	Season	Division	Apps	Goals	Apps	Goals	Apps	Goals
Stoke	1903–04	First Division	4	1	0	0	4	1
Stoke	1904–05	First Division	2	1	0	0	2	1
Career Total			6	2	0	0	6	2
