= Wilf Haines =

English footballer

Personal information
- Full name: Wilfred Henry Haines
- Date of birth: June 1882
- Place of birth: Stone, Staffordshire, England
- Date of death: Unknown
- Position: Outside right

Senior career*
Years	Team	Apps	(Gls)
–	Mount Pleasant Alliance		
1903–1904	Newcastle Swifts		
1904–1905	Stoke	3	(1)
1905–1907	Hanley Swifts		
1907–1908	Stafford Rangers		
1908–1909	Birmingham	3	(0)
1909–19??	Leek United		
–	Stafford Rangers		
- * Club domestic league appearances and goals

Wilfred Henry Haines (June 1882 – after 1908) was an English professional footballer who played in the Football League for Stoke and Birmingham.

== Career ==
Haines was born in Stone, Staffordshire and played amateur football with Mount Pleasant Alliance and Newcastle Swifts before joining Stoke in 1904. He played three matches for Stoke in 1904–05 scoring once which came on this final day of the season against Small Heath before returning to non-league football in the Staffordshire area. Birmingham paid Stafford Rangers £250 for his services in July 1908, expecting him to improve their chances of immediate promotion back to the First Division. He played only twice before the arrival of outside right Jack Wilcox pushed him even further down the pecking order, and he was released back to Staffordshire football at the end of the season.

== Career statistics ==
Club	Season	League			FA Cup		Total	
Club	Season	Division	Apps	Goals	Apps	Goals	Apps	Goals
Stoke	1904–05	First Division	3	1	0	0	3	1
Birmingham	1908–09	Second Division	3	0	0	0	3	0
Career Total			6	1	0	0	6	1
