= Ross Fielding =

English footballer

Personal information
- Full name: Arthur Ross Fielding
- Date of birth: 21 September 1880
- Place of birth: Trentham, England
- Date of death: 1947 (aged 67)
- Place of death: Stoke-on-Trent, England
- Position: Winger

Senior career*
Years	Team	Apps	(Gls)
1900	Hartshill		
1901–1902	Stoke	2	(0)
1902–1903	Nottingham Forest	10	(0)
1903–1907	Stoke	99	(11)
1908–1909	West Bromwich Albion	9	(0)
1909	Burton United		
Total		120	(11)
- * Club domestic league appearances and goals

Arthur Ross Fielding (21 September 1880 – 1947) was an English footballer who played in the Football League for Nottingham Forest, Stoke and West Bromwich Albion.

== Career ==
Fielding played for Hartshill before joining Stoke in 1901. He played twice for Stoke in 1901–02 before joining Nottingham Forest where he spent the 1902–03 season failing to establish himself in the side making 10 appearances. He re-joined Stoke in 1903–04 and established himself at outside right making 109 appearances for the "Potters". He left for West Bromwich Albion in 1908 after Stoke's relegation and later played for Burton United

== Career statistics ==
Appearances and goals by club, season and competition
Club	Season	League			FA Cup		Total	
Club	Season	Division	Apps	Goals	Apps	Goals	Apps	Goals
Stoke	1901–02	First Division	2	0	0	0	2	0
Nottingham Forest	1902–03	First Division	10	0	0	0	10	0
Stoke	1903–04	First Division	5	0	1	0	6	0
Stoke	1904–05	First Division	11	3	2	0	13	3
Stoke	1905–06	First Division	28	2	1	0	29	2
Stoke	1906–07	First Division	28	4	3	1	31	5
Stoke	1907–08	Second Division	27	2	1	0	28	2
West Bromwich Albion	1908–09	Second Division	9	0	0	0	9	0
Career Total			120	11	8	1	128	12
