= Jackie Chalmers =

Scottish footballer

Personal information
- Full name: John Chalmers
- Date of birth: 14 August 1884
- Place of birth: Rutherglen, Scotland
- Date of death: 5 July 1947 (aged 62)
- Place of death: Glasgow, Scotland
- Position: Centre forward

Senior career*
Years	Team	Apps	(Gls)
1903	Rutherglen Glencairn		
1904–1905	Rangers	1	(0)
1905	Beith		
1905–1907	Stoke	40	(19)
1908	Bristol Rovers	1	(1)
1908–1910	Clyde	52	(25)
1910–1912	Woolwich Arsenal	48	(21)
1912–1914	Greenock Morton	40	(17)
1913	→ West Stanley (loan)		
1914	→ Clyde (loan)	12	(10)
1914–1915	Shelbourne		
1915	Cadzow St Anne's		
1917	Cambuslang Rangers		
Total		193	(92)
- * Club domestic league appearances and goals

John Chalmers (14 August 1884 – 5 July 1947) was a Scottish footballer who played in the Football League for Stoke and Woolwich Arsenal.

== Career ==
Chalmers was born in Beith and started his career with Rutherglen Glencairn before turning professional with Rangers. He moved to Stoke City in January 1906 and made an instant impact scoring five goals in five games. He was the club's top scorer in the 1906–07 season, though they were relegated from the First Division. In all he scored 19 goals in 40 appearances but was released in the summer of 1907. He had a spell at Southern League Bristol Rovers, before moving back north of the border to join Clyde in November 1908. In 1909–10 Chalmers was in Clyde's side that reached the Scottish Cup final, which they eventually lost to Dundee in the second replay.

In October 1910 Chalmers was tempted south of the border again, signing for Woolwich Arsenal. Arsenal had been ailing in the First Division; they had only scored twice in their first six matches of the 1910–11 season and were languishing in seventeenth place. Chalmers made his debut against Bradford City on 8 October 1910 and soon had an immediate impact on Arsenal's season, scoring fifteen league goals (and one in the FA Cup, making him the club's top scorer with sixteen), as Arsenal finished a comfortable tenth.

Chalmers was a first-team starter the next season, but lost his place to Alf Common, who had been moved from inside-forward to centre-forward. Chalmers was unhappy playing for Arsenal's reserves and was transferred to Morton in March 1912.

== Career statistics ==
Club	Season	League			FA Cup		Glasgow Cup		Total	
Club	Season	Division	Apps	Goals	Apps	Goals	Apps	Goals	Apps	Goals
Rangers	1904–05	Scottish Division One	1	0	2	2	2	0	5	2
Stoke	1905–06	First Division	5	5	0	0	—		5	5
Stoke	1906–07	First Division	26	11	3	0	—		29	11
Stoke	1907–08	Second Division	9	3	0	0	—		9	3
Stoke	Total		40	19	3	0	—		43	19
Woolwich Arsenal	1910–11	First Division	29	15	2	1	—		31	16
Woolwich Arsenal	1911–12	First Division	19	6	1	0	—		20	6
Woolwich Arsenal	Total		48	21	3	1	—		51	22
Career Total			89	40	8	3	2	0	99	43
