= Harry Smith (footballer, born 1885) =

English footballer

Personal information
- Full name: Harry Smith
- Date of birth: 1885
- Place of birth: Cannock, England
- Position: Left back

Senior career*
| Years | Team | Apps | (Gls) |
| 1906 | Walsall | | |
| 1907–1908 | Stoke | 1 | (0) |
| 1908 | Walsall | | |
- * Club domestic league appearances and goals

Harry Smith (born 1885) was a footballer who played in the Football League for Stoke and Walsall.

== Career ==
Smith was born in Cannock and played for Walsall before joining Stoke in 1907. He played in his one and only Football League match on 14 March 1908, at home to West Bromwich Albion, in a 1–1 draw. He did not play for the club again and re-joined Walsall.

== Career statistics ==
Appearances and goals by club, season and competition
| Club | Season | League | | | FA Cup | | Total | |
| Club | Season | Division | Apps | Goals | Apps | Goals | Apps | Goals |
|---|---|---|---|---|---|---|---|---|
| Stoke | 1907–08 | Second Division | 1 | 0 | 0 | 0 | 1 | 0 |
| Career total | | | 1 | 0 | 0 | 0 | 1 | 0 |
