= Albert Purcell =

English footballer

Personal information
- Full name: Albert Purcell
- Date of birth: 3 July 1913
- Place of birth: Burslem, England
- Date of death: 2001 (aged 87–88)
- Position: Left winger

Youth career
- Kidsgrove Liverpool Road

Senior career*
Years	Team	Apps	(Gls)
1933–1935	Port Vale	4	(0)
Total		4	(0)
- * Club domestic league appearances and goals

Albert Purcell (3 July 1913 – 2001) was an English footballer who played four games as a left winger for Port Vale in the mid-1930s.

== Career ==
Purcell played for Kidsgrove Liverpool Road before joining Football League Second Division side Port Vale as an amateur in November 1933. He made his debut in a 2–0 defeat at Old Trafford to Manchester United on 14 April 1934 and also played at the Old Recreation Ground in a 4–0 home over Plymouth Argyle seven days later. After recovering from a serious nose injury in 1934, he played two games in the 1934–35 season before being released in the summer.

== Career statistics ==
Appearances and goals by club, season and competition
Club	Season	League			FA Cup		Other		Total	
Club	Season	Division	Apps	Goals	Apps	Goals	Apps	Goals	Apps	Goals
Port Vale	1933–34	Second Division	2	0	0	0	0	0	2	0
Port Vale	1934–35	Second Division	2	0	0	0	0	0	2	0
Port Vale	Total		4	0	0	0	0	0	4	0
