= Percy Thorpe =

English footballer

Personal information
- Date of birth: 18 July 1899
- Place of birth: Nottingham, England
- Date of death: 1972 (aged 72–73)
- Position: Right-back

Youth career
- Sutton Town

Senior career*
Years	Team	Apps	(Gls)
1924–1928	Blackpool	113	(5)
1928	Connah's Quay & Shotton		
1928–1929	Reading	72	(0)
1930–1932	Sheffield United	103	(0)
1933	West Ham United	3	(0)
1934	Accrington Stanley	2	(0)
1934–1935	Port Vale	1	(0)
Total		294+	(5+)
- * Club domestic league appearances and goals

Percy Thorpe (18 July 1899 – 1972) was an English footballer who played at right-back for Sutton Town, Blackpool, Connah's Quay & Shotton, Reading, Sheffield United, West Ham United, Accrington Stanley, and Port Vale.

== Career ==
Thorpe signed for Frank Buckley's Blackpool prior to the start of the 1924–25 season after leaving non-League Sutton Town. He made his debut for the club in the opening League game, a single-goal victory at Clapton Orient on 30 August. He went on to make a further eleven league appearances that campaign, the majority of which were spent at centre-half; however, he did play up front alongside the prolific Harry Bedford for one game, in the absence of Matt Barrass.

In 1925–26, Thorpe made thirty Second Division appearances and scored three goals. He spent the majority of that campaign at right full-back, but also switched to the left side briefly. He scored his first goal for Blackpool in a 3–2 Boxing Day victory over Chelsea at Bloomfield Road. It came from the penalty spot, as did his other two goals. Thorpe appeared in 38 of Blackpool's 42 league games of 1926–27. He scored two goals – one a penalty, the other from open play. Sydney Beaumont succeeded Frank Buckley as manager for the 1927–28 campaign. Beaumont gave 33 starts to Thorpe in what was his final season with the club. His final appearance for Blackpool occurred in the season's final game, a 4–0 home victory over Fulham on 5 May.

After leaving Blackpool, Thorpe joined Connah's Quay & Shotton before returning to the Second Division with Reading. He joined Sheffield United in 1930. The "Blades" finished 15th in the First Division in 1930–31, seventh in 1931–32, and tenth in 1932–33. In three years at Bramall Lane, he scored 24 goals in 114 league and cup competitions.

He later had brief spells with West Ham United and Accrington Stanley before he finished his career at Port Vale. He signed as a 35-year-old in November 1934 and made his final footballing appearance on 19 November at the Old Recreation Ground in a goalless draw against the club with which he made his name – Blackpool. He retired at the end of the 1934–35 season.

== Career statistics ==
Appearances and goals by club, season and competition
Club	Season	League			FA Cup		Total	
Club	Season	Division	Apps	Goals	Apps	Goals	Apps	Goals
Blackpool	1924–25	Second Division	12	0	0	0	12	0
Blackpool	1925–26	Second Division	30	3	1	0	31	3
Blackpool	1926–27	Second Division	38	2	1	0	39	2
Blackpool	1927–28	Second Division	33	0	0	0	33	0
Blackpool	Total		113	5	2	0	115	5
Reading	1928–29	Second Division	34	0	0	0	34	0
Reading	1929–30	Second Division	38	0	1	0	39	0
Reading	Total		72	0	1	0	73	0
Sheffield United	1930–31	First Division	38	0	4	0	42	0
Sheffield United	1931–32	First Division	33	0	2	0	35	0
Sheffield United	1932–33	First Division	32	0	2	0	34	0
Sheffield United	Total		103	0	8	0	111	0
West Ham United	1933–34	Second Division	3	0	0	0	3	0
Accrington Stanley	1934–35	Third Division North	2	0	0	0	2	0
Port Vale	1934–35	Second Division	1	0	0	0	1	0
Career total			294	5	11	0	305	5
