= Charlie Axcell =

English footballer

Personal information
- Full name: Charles Edward Axcell
- Date of birth: 14 March 1880
- Place of birth: Leigh-on-Sea, England
- Date of death: 18 January 1949 (aged 68)
- Place of death: Leigh-on-Sea, England
- Position: Forward

Senior career*
| Years | Team | Apps | (Gls) |
| 1902 | Leigh Ramblers | | |
| 1903–1904 | Fulham | | |
| 1904–1905 | Grays United | | |
| 1905–1906 | Burton United | 31 | (9) |
| 1907 | Stoke | 3 | (0) |
| 1907 | Burton United | | |
| 1908 | Southend United | | |
- * Club domestic league appearances and goals

Charles Edward Axcell (14 March 1880 – 18 January 1949) was an English footballer who played in the Football League for Burton United and Stoke.

== Career ==
Axcell was born in Leigh-on-Sea and played for Leigh Ramblers, Fulham and Grays United before joining Football League side Burton United in 1905. After a season and a half with Burton he joined Stoke in December 1906. However, he only played three matches for Stoke in 1906–07 failing to impress the directors who sent him back to Burton in February. He then returned Essex to play for Southend United.

== Career statistics ==
Appearances and goals by club, season and competition
| Club | Season | League | | | FA Cup | | Total | |
| Club | Season | Division | Apps | Goals | Apps | Goals | Apps | Goals |
|---|---|---|---|---|---|---|---|---|
| Burton United | 1905–06 | Second Division | 15 | 5 | 0 | 0 | 15 | 5 |
| Burton United | 1906–07 | Second Division | 16 | 4 | 1 | 1 | 17 | 5 |
| Stoke | 1906–07 | First Division | 3 | 0 | 0 | 0 | 3 | 0 |
| Career total | | | 34 | 9 | 1 | 1 | 35 | 10 |
