= Walter Rogers (footballer) =

English footballer

Personal information
- Full name: Walter Rogers
- Date of birth: 1883
- Place of birth: Stoke-upon-Trent, England
- Position: Left half

Senior career*
| Years | Team | Apps | (Gls) |
| 1906–1907 | Burslem Port Vale | 0 | (0) |
| 1907–1908 | Stoke | 1 | (0) |
- Reading
- * Club domestic league appearances and goals

Walter Rogers (born 1883; date of death unknown) was an English footballer who played in the Football League for Stoke.

== Career ==
Rogers was born in Stoke-upon-Trent and was an unused squad player at Burslem Port Vale, before joining Football League Second Division side Stoke in 1907. His only appearance for Stoke which came in a 2–0 defeat away at Glossop on 15 February 1908. He left the Victoria Ground at the end of the 1907–08 season, and later played for Southern League side Reading.

== Career statistics ==
Appearances and goals by club, season and competition
| Club | Season | League | | | FA Cup | | Total | |
| Club | Season | Division | Apps | Goals | Apps | Goals | Apps | Goals |
|---|---|---|---|---|---|---|---|---|
| Burslem Port Vale | 1906–07 | Second Division | 0 | 0 | 0 | 0 | 0 | 0 |
| Stoke | 1907–08 | Second Division | 1 | 0 | 0 | 0 | 1 | 0 |
| Career total | | | 1 | 0 | 0 | 0 | 1 | 0 |
