= Jack Whitley =

English footballer

Personal information
- Full name: Jack Whitley
- Date of birth: 1880
- Place of birth: Seacombe, England
- Date of death: 5 July 1955 (aged 75)
- Place of death: London, England
- Position: Goalkeeper

Senior career*
Years	Team	Apps	(Gls)
- Liscard YMCA
1899–1900	Darwen	14	(0)
1900–1901	Aston Villa	11	(0)
1902–1904	Everton	11	(0)
1904–1906	Stoke	36	(0)
1906–1907	Leeds City	7	(0)
1907	Lincoln City	0	(0)
1907–1914	Chelsea	127	(0)
Total		206	(0)
- * Club domestic league appearances and goals

Jack Whitley (1880–5 July 1955) was an English footballer who played in the Football League for Aston Villa, Chelsea, Darwen, Everton, Lincoln City, Leeds City and Stoke.

== Career ==
Whitley was born in Seacombe, Cheshire, and played amateur football with Liscard YMCA before joining Football League side Darwen in 1899. He played 14 times for Darwen in the Second Division as they lost their Football League status and so he joined Aston Villa for £50. He managed eleven appearances for Villa before signing for Everton where he played second fiddle to George Kitchen. He joined Stoke in 1904 and played in 34 matches during the 1904–05 season before losing his place to Leigh Richmond Roose. He then moved on to Leeds City and Lincoln City before finally finding regular football with Chelsea.

== Legacy ==
Following his death in 1955, Whitley was buried in an unmarked grave at Brompton Cemetery, next to Chelsea's Stamford Bridge ground, the only Chelsea player known to be buried there. In 2017, the Chelsea Supporters Trust launched an appeal to fund the cost of a gravestone.

== Career statistics ==
Appearances and goals by club, season and competition
Club	Season	League			FA Cup		Total	
Club	Season	Division	Apps	Goals	Apps	Goals	Apps	Goals
Darwen	1898–99	Second Division	14	0	0	0	14	0
Aston Villa	1900–01	First Division	3	0	0	0	3	0
Aston Villa	1901–02	First Division	8	0	0	0	18	0
Aston Villa	Total		11	0	0	0	11	0
Everton	1902–03	First Division	8	0	3	0	11	0
Everton	1903–04	First Division	3	0	0	0	3	0
Everton	Total		11	0	3	0	14	0
Stoke	1904–05	First Division	32	0	2	0	34	0
Stoke	1905–06	First Division	4	0	0	0	4	0
Stoke	Total		36	0	2	0	38	0
Leeds City	1905–06	Second Division	3	0	0	0	3	0
Leeds City	1906–07	Second Division	4	0	0	0	4	0
Leeds City	Total		7	0	0	0	7	0
Chelsea	1907–08	First Division	23	0	2	0	25	0
Chelsea	1908–09	First Division	36	0	3	0	39	0
Chelsea	1909–10	First Division	35	0	2	0	37	0
Chelsea	1910–11	Second Division	1	0	2	0	3	0
Chelsea	1911–12	Second Division	26	0	2	0	28	0
Chelsea	1912–13	First Division	3	0	0	0	3	0
Chelsea	1913–14	First Division	3	0	0	0	3	0
Chelsea	Total		127	0	11	0	138	0
Career Total			206	0	16	0	222	0
