= Jimmy Gemmell =

Scottish footballer

Personal information
- Full name: James Gemmell
- Date of birth: 17 November 1880
- Place of birth: Glasgow, Scotland
- Date of death: Unknown
- Position: Inside forward

Senior career*
Years	Team	Apps	(Gls)
1899	Duntocher Hibernian		
1900	Clyde		
1900–1906	Sunderland	176	(43)
1907	Stoke	11	(2)
1907–1909	Leeds City	67	(14)
1910–1911	Sunderland	36	(3)
1911	Third Lanark		
1912	West Stanley		
Total		290	(62)
- * Club domestic league appearances and goals

James Gemmell (17 November 1880 – after 1911) was a Scottish footballer who played in the Football League for Stoke, Sunderland and Leeds City as an inside forward.

== Club career ==
Gemmell was born in Glasgow and played for Duntocher Hibernian and Clyde before joining Sunderland in 1900. He made his debut for Sunderland on 8 December 1900 against Sheffield Wednesday in a 1–0 win at Roker Park. He was at Sunderland in two different spells; in 1900–07 and 1910–12 respectively, separated by a stay at Leeds United. During his first stay at Sunderland, he won the 1902 English Football League Championship. Gemmell made 213 league appearances for Sunderland, scoring 46 goals.

In 1907 Gemmell signed for Second Division Stoke but after making 11 appearances scoring twice he was sold to Leeds City due to Stoke having serious financial difficulties.

== Career statistics ==
Appearances and goals by club, season and competition
Club	Season	League			FA Cup		Total	
Club	Season	Division	Apps	Goals	Apps	Goals	Apps	Goals
Sunderland	1900–01	First Division	3	0	0	0	3	0
Sunderland	1901–02	First Division	31	10	2	0	33	10
Sunderland	1902–03	First Division	22	7	1	0	23	7
Sunderland	1903–04	First Division	29	10	1	0	30	10
Sunderland	1904–05	First Division	32	5	1	0	33	5
Sunderland	1905–06	First Division	29	7	4	0	33	7
Sunderland	1906–07	First Division	30	4	5	0	35	4
Sunderland	Total		176	43	14	0	190	43
Stoke	1907–08	Second Division	11	2	0	0	11	2
Leeds City	1907–08	Second Division	16	3	1	0	17	3
Leeds City	1908–09	Second Division	28	8	4	0	32	8
Leeds City	1909–10	Second Division	23	3	1	0	24	3
Leeds City	Total		67	14	6	0	73	14
Sunderland	1910–11	First Division	20	1	1	0	21	1
Sunderland	1911–12	First Division	16	2	0	0	16	2
Sunderland	Total		36	3	1	0	37	3
Career total			290	62	21	0	311	62

== Honours ==
Sunderland

- Football League First Division champions: 1901–02
