= Horace Brindley =

English footballer

Personal information
- Full name: Horace Brindley
- Date of birth: 1 January 1885
- Place of birth: Knutton, England
- Date of death: 1971 (aged 86)
- Height: 5 ft 8 in (1.73 m)
- Position: Outside left

Senior career*
Years	Team	Apps	(Gls)
1903	Knutton Villa		
1904–1905	Stoke	4	(0)
1905	Crewe Alexandra		
1906	Norwich City		
1907–1908	Blackpool	17	(2)
1908–1910	Crewe Alexandra		
1910-11	Queens Park Rangers	17	(0)
1911	Luton Town		
1912–1914	Lincoln City	50	(4)
1914	Chester		
Total		71	(6)
- * Club domestic league appearances and goals

Horace Brindley (1 January 1885 – 1971) was an English footballer who played in the Football League for Blackpool, Lincoln City and Stoke as well as a number of Southern League clubs.

== Career ==
Brindley began his career with his local side Knutton Villa before joining Stoke in 1904. He played four times for Stoke during the 1904–05 season and then left for Crewe Alexandra at the end of the season. He then played for Norwich City, spent a season with Blackpool, returned to Crewe, Southern League sides Queens Park Rangers and Luton Town. In 1912 he joined Lincoln City where he spent two seasons making 53 appearances scoring four goals. He ended his career with Chester City.

== Career statistics ==
Appearances and goals by club, season and competition
Club	Season	League			FA Cup		Total	
Club	Season	Division	Apps	Goals	Apps	Goals	Apps	Goals
Stoke	1904–05	First Division	4	0	0	0	4	0
Blackpool	1907–08	Second Division	17	2	1	0	18	2
Lincoln City	1912–13	Second Division	26	0	2	0	28	0
Lincoln City	1913–14	Second Division	24	4	1	0	25	4
Career total			71	6	4	0	75	6
