= Bill Godley =

English footballer

Personal information
- Full name: William Godley
- Date of birth: 10 April 1880
- Place of birth: Durham, England
- Date of death: 1960 (aged 80)
- Position: Centre forward

Senior career*
Years	Team	Apps	(Gls)
1901	South Bank		
1902–1904	Middlesbrough	2	(0)
1904–1905	Stoke	2	(0)
1905–1906	Plymouth Argyle	8	(2)
1906	Reading		
1907	New Brompton		
1908	Darlington		
- * Club domestic league appearances and goals

William Godley (10 April 1880 – 1960) was an English footballer who played in the Football League for Middlesbrough and Stoke.

== Career ==
Godley was born in Durham and played for South Bank before joining Middlesbrough in 1902. He played twice for "Boro" before joining Stoke where he played three times in 1904–05 scoring once against Grimsby Town in the FA Cup. He then went on to play for Plymouth Argyle, Reading, New Brompton and Darlington.

== Career statistics ==
Appearances and goals by club, season and competition
Club	Season	League			FA Cup		Total	
Club	Season	Division	Apps	Goals	Apps	Goals	Apps	Goals
Middlesbrough	1902–03	First Division	1	0	0	0	1	0
Middlesbrough	1903–04	First Division	1	0	0	0	1	0
Stoke	1904–05	First Division	2	0	1	1	3	1
Plymouth Argyle	1905–06	Southern League	8	2	0	0	8	2
Career total			12	2	1	1	13	3
