= George Gallimore =

English footballer

Personal information
- Full name: George Arthur Gallimore
- Date of birth: August 1886
- Place of birth: Longton, England
- Date of death: 1949 (aged 62–63)
- Place of death: Stoke-on-Trent, England

Senior career*
Years	Team	Apps	(Gls)
- Ashwood Vale
- East Vale
1903–1908	Stoke	77	(15)
1908–1910	Sheffield United	16	(2)
1910–1911	Birmingham	18	(1)
1911–19xx	Leek		
- * Club domestic league appearances and goals

George Arthur Gallimore (August 1886 – 1949) was an English professional footballer who made more than 100 appearances in the Football League playing for Stoke, Sheffield United and Birmingham. He played as a left-sided or centre forward.

== Career ==
Gallimore was born in East Vale, Longton, Staffordshire. He played local football before signing for Stoke in 1903. He became a useful forward for a struggling Stoke side, scoring 17 goals in 85 matches. With Stoke in financial difficulties in 1907–08, he and teammate Albert Sturgess joined Sheffield United in May 1908, but he failed to establish himself in his two seasons with the "Blades". He then signed for Second Division club Birmingham in 1910. He began the 1910–11 season in the starting eleven at outside left, but lost his place in December 1910 and rarely played again. He moved back to non-league football with Leek in 1911. Gallimore died in Stoke-on-Trent in 1949 aged about 63.

== Career statistics ==
Appearances and goals by club, season and competition
Club	Season	League			FA Cup		Total	
Club	Season	Division	Apps	Goals	Apps	Goals	Apps	Goals
Stoke	1903–04	First Division	3	1	0	0	3	1
Stoke	1904–05	First Division	9	1	2	0	11	1
Stoke	1905–06	First Division	20	5	1	0	21	5
Stoke	1906–07	First Division	21	2	0	0	21	2
Stoke	1907–08	Second Division	24	6	5	2	29	8
Stoke	Total		77	15	8	2	85	17
Sheffield United	1908–09	First Division	11	2	0	0	11	2
Sheffield United	1909–10	First Division	5	0	0	0	5	0
Sheffield United	Total		16	2	0	0	16	2
Birmingham	1910–11	Second Division	18	1	0	0	18	1
Career total			111	18	8	2	119	20
