= James Sheridan (footballer) =

Irish footballer

Personal information
- Full name: James Sheridan
- Date of birth: 15 May 1882
- Place of birth: Downpatrick, Ireland
- Date of death: 1960 (aged 77–78)
- Height: 5 ft 7 1/2 in (1.71 m)
- Position: Centre forward

Senior career*
Years	Team	Apps	(Gls)
1901–1902	Cambuslang Hibernian		
1902–1904	Everton	20	(4)
1904–1905	Stoke	12	(1)
1905–1906	New Brompton		
1906	Colne		
1906–1907	Accrington Stanley		
1907–1908	Bo'ness		
1908–1909	Shelbourne		
1909	Broxburn Athletic		
1909–1910	Clyde	2	(4)
1910	Alloa Athletic		
1910	Dundee Hibernian		
1910–1911	Hamilton Academical	5	(0)
1911	Port Glasgow Athletic		
1911–1912	Newcastle City		
1912–1913	Ashington		

International career
1903–1905	Ireland	6	(2)
- * Club domestic league appearances and goals

James "Paddy" Sheridan (15 May 1882 – 1960) was an Irish footballer who played in the Football League for Everton and Stoke. He also played for the Ireland national team.

== Career ==
Born in County Down, Sheridan had moved to Scotland with his family by the time of the 1901 United Kingdom census, when they were living in Larkhall, Lanarkshire. He played football locally for Cambuslang Hibernian before joining Everton in 1903. He spent two seasons with the Toffees and then transferred to Stoke in the summer of 1904.

Having been Everton's first Ireland international in February 1903 he claimed the same distinction for Stoke two years later, however he only scored one goal for the club (against Wolverhampton Wanderers in December 1904) and left at the end of the 1904–05 season. He then played for several clubs in northern England, Ireland and Scotland for short periods over the next eight years.

== Career statistics ==
=== Club ===
Appearances and goals by club, season and competition
Club	Season	League			FA Cup		Total	
Club	Season	Division	Apps	Goals	Apps	Goals	Apps	Goals
Everton	1902–03	First Division	17	2	0	0	17	2
Everton	1903–04	First Division	3	2	0	0	3	2
Stoke	1904–05	First Division	12	1	0	0	12	1
Career Total			32	5	0	0	32	5

=== International ===
National team	Year	Apps	Goals
Ireland	1903	3	1
Ireland	1904	2	1
Ireland	1905	1	0
Total		6	2
