= 1906–07 Stoke F.C. season =

Stoke
1906–07 season
- Chairman: Mr W Cowlishaw
- Manager: Horace Austerberry
- Stadium: Victoria Ground
- Football League First Division: 20th (26 Points)
- FA Cup: First Round
- Top goalscorer: League: John Chalmers (11); All: John Chalmers (11)
- Highest home attendance: 12,000 vs Aston Villa (3 September 1906)
- Lowest home attendance: 3,000 vs Middlesbrough (20 April 1907)
- Average home league attendance: 5,605
Home colours

The 1906–07 season was Stoke's 18th season in the Football League.

After flirting with relegation for quite a while, Stoke's luck run out in 1906–07 as they were relegated, finishing bottom of the First Division with 26 points, five away from safety. It was a bad season for Stoke and would be the start of a troubled period for the club.

== Season review ==
=== League ===
After a good 1905–06 season, the 1906–07 campaign ended in tears and sorrow for Stoke supporters, as the team finished bottom of the First Division and were relegated for the first time. They dropped to the foot of the table early in the new year and stayed there winning just 4 of the last 16 fixtures. Finance was bad and Fred Rouse left for Everton in a £600 deal in November much to the annoyance of the fans. Defence was a problem for Horace Austerberry and he used 28 players including 4 amateurs. Stoke scored just 41 goals in 38 matches and there was hardly a bright spot throughout the season and Stoke entered the Football League Second Division for the first time.

=== FA Cup ===
Stoke's poor league form was not helped by three matches against West Bromwich Albion after drawing 1–1 and 2–2 West Brom won 2–0 in the second replay at Villa Park.

== Final league table ==
Pos	Team	Pld	W	D	L	GF	GA	GAv	Pts	Relegation
16	Bury	38	13	6	19	58	68	0.853	32	
17	Manchester City	38	10	12	16	53	77	0.688	32	
18	Notts County	38	8	15	15	46	50	0.920	31	
19	Derby County (R)	38	9	9	20	41	59	0.695	27	Relegation to the Second Division
20	Stoke (R)	38	8	10	20	41	64	0.641	26	Relegation to the Second Division

Source: World Football
Rules for classification: 1) Points; 2) Goal average; 3) Goals scored
(R) Relegated

== Results ==
Stoke's score comes first

=== Legend ===
Win	Draw	Loss

=== Football League First Division ===
Match	Date	Opponent	Venue	Result	Attendance	Scorers
1	1 September 1906	Liverpool	A	0–1	30,000	
2	3 September 1906	Aston Villa	H	0–2	12,000	
3	8 September 1906	Bristol City	H	0–3	6,000	
4	10 September 1906	Aston Villa	A	0–1	20,000	
5	15 September 1906	Notts County	A	2–2	11,000	Rouse, Fielding
6	22 September 1906	Sheffield United	H	1–1	5,000	Rouse
7	29 September 1906	Bolton Wanderers	A	1–1	10,000	Chalmers
8	6 October 1906	Manchester United	H	1–2	9,000	Rouse
9	13 October 1906	Derby County	H	2–1	6,000	Arrowsmith (2)
10	20 October 1906	Blackburn Rovers	A	1–3	10,000	Rouse
11	27 October 1906	Sunderland	H	2–2	7,000	Arrowsmith, Holford
12	3 November 1906	Birmingham	A	1–2	8,000	Holford
13	10 November 1906	Everton	H	2–0	6,000	Arrowsmith, Capes
14	12 November 1906	Blackburn Rovers	H	1–1	5,000	Fielding
15	17 November 1906	Woolwich Arsenal	A	1–2	10,000	Baddeley
16	24 November 1906	The Wednesday	H	1–1	6,000	Holford (pen)
17	1 December 1906	Bury	A	0–2	7,000	
18	8 December 1906	Manchester City	H	3–0	7,000	Holford, Chalmers (2)
19	15 December 1906	Middlesbrough	A	0–5	12,000	
20	22 December 1906	Preston North End	H	0–2	6,000	
21	24 December 1906	Bolton Wanderers	H	3–0	5,000	Chalmers (2), Sturgess
22	26 December 1906	Newcastle United	H	1–2	9,000	Arrowsmith
23	5 January 1907	Bristol City	A	0–4	6,000	
24	19 January 1907	Notts County	H	1–1	3,000	Capes
25	26 January 1907	Sheffield United	A	0–2	9,000	
26	9 February 1907	Manchester United	A	1–4	7,000	Holford (pen)
27	16 February 1907	Derby County	A	1–2	10,000	Gallimore
28	2 March 1907	Sunderland	A	1–3	12,000	Fielding
29	9 March 1907	Birmingham	H	3–0	3,000	Fielding, Baddeley, Chalmers
30	11 March 1907	Liverpool	H	1–1	3,000	Chalmers
31	16 March 1907	Everton	A	0–3	8,000	
32	29 March 1907	Newcastle United	A	0–1	30,000	
33	30 March 1907	The Wednesday	A	1–0	10,000	Chalmers
34	6 April 1907	Bury	H	3–1	3,000	Chalmers, Gallimore, Arrowsmith
35	13 April 1907	Manchester City	A	2–2	10,000	Arrowsmith, Baddeley (pen)
36	15 April 1907	Woolwich Arsenal	H	2–0	4,000	Chalmers, Sturgess
37	20 April 1907	Middlesbrough	H	0–2	3,000	
38	27 April 1907	Preston North End	A	2–2	6,000	Chalmers, Davies

=== FA Cup ===
Round	Date	Opponent	Venue	Result	Attendance	Scorers
R1	12 January 1907	West Bromwich Albion	A	1–1	30,000	Baddeley
R1 Replay	17 January 1907	West Bromwich Albion	H	2–2	14,000	Arrowsmith, Fielding
R1 Second Replay	21 January 1907	West Bromwich Albion	N	0–2	25,000	

== Squad statistics ==
Pos.	Name	League		FA Cup		Total	
Pos.	Name	Apps	Goals	Apps	Goals	Apps	Goals
GK	(England) Fred Rathbone	1	0	0	0	1	0
GK	(Wales) Leigh Richmond Roose	30	0	2	0	32	0
GK	(England) Isaiah Turner	7	0	1	0	8	0
FB	(England) Harry Benson	6	0	0	0	6	0
FB	(England) Charlie Burgess	36	0	3	0	39	0
FB	(England) Albert Cook	1	0	0	0	1	0
FB	(Wales) Lloyd Davies	23	0	3	0	26	0
FB	(England) Ernest Mullineux	16	0	3	0	19	0
HB	(England) George Baddeley	32	3	3	1	35	4
HB	(England) Harry Croxton	6	0	0	0	6	0
HB	(England) Tom Holford	35	5	1	0	36	5
HB	(England) Albert Sturgess	37	2	3	0	40	2
HB	(England) John Whitehouse	2	0	0	0	2	0
FW	(England) Arthur Arrowsmith	34	7	3	1	37	8
FW	(England) Charlie Axcell	3	0	0	0	3	0
FW	(England) Amos Baddeley	4	0	0	0	4	0
FW	(England) Freddie Brown	4	0	0	0	4	0
FW	(England) Adrian Capes	11	2	2	0	13	2
FW	(Scotland) Jackie Chalmers	26	11	3	0	29	11
FW	(Wales) Billy Davies	12	1	1	0	13	1
FW	(England) Ross Fielding	28	4	3	1	31	5
FW	(England) George Gallimore	21	2	0	0	21	2
FW	(England) Arthur Griffiths	4	0	0	0	4	0
FW	(Wales) John Love Jones	2	0	0	0	2	0
FW	(England) Jack Miller	23	0	2	0	25	0
FW	(England) Ernie Millward	0	0	0	0	0	0
FW	(England) Syd Owen	1	0	0	0	1	0
FW	(England) Fred Rouse	10	4	0	0	10	4
FW	(England) Bill Williamson	3	0	0	0	3	0
