= Bill Williamson (footballer) =

English footballer

Personal information
- Full name: William Mountford Williamson
- Date of birth: 1887
- Place of birth: Longton, England
- Date of death: 2 August 1918 (aged 30–31)
- Place of death: Hamelin, Germany
- Position: Outside right

Senior career*
Years	Team	Apps	(Gls)
- North Staffs Normads
1906–1908	Stoke	8	(0)
1908–1910	Crewe Alexandra		
1910–1911	Leicester Fosse	2	(0)
1911	Stoke	0	(0)
- Wellington Town
Total		10	(0)
- * Club domestic league appearances and goals

William Mountford Williamson (1887 – 2 August 1918) was an English footballer who played in the Football League for Leicester Fosse and Stoke as an outside right.

== Career ==
Williamson began his career at local amateur club North Staffs Normads, before joining First Division club Stoke in 1906. He made just 8 appearances during two years at the Victoria Ground and transferred to Birmingham & District League club Crewe Alexandra in 1910, with whom he spent a further two years. Williamson re-entered League football with Leicester Fosse in 1910, but made just two appearances. He re-joined Stoke in 1911, but failed to gain a place in the first team and left to join Wellington Town.

== Personal life ==
Prior to the First World War, Williamson enlisted in the Gordon Highlanders. He was in Egypt with his battalion when the war broke out in August 1914 and after a brief spell back in the UK, the battalion was deployed on the Western Front two months later. Williamson saw action at the First Battle of Ypres and was wounded in the left hand, left knee and taken prisoner of war by Germany. He died of Spanish flu at Hamelin prisoner of war camp on 2 August 1918 and is commemorated on the Cologne Memorial.

== Career statistics ==
Appearances and goals by club, season and competition
Club	Season	League			FA Cup		Total	
Club	Season	Division	Apps	Goals	Apps	Goals	Apps	Goals
Stoke	1906–07	First Division	3	0	0	0	3	0
Stoke	1907–08	Second Division	5	0	0	0	5	0
Stoke	Total		8	0	0	0	8	0
Leicester Fosse	1910–11	Second Division	2	0	0	0	2	0
Career total			10	0	0	0	10	0
