= Arthur Arrowsmith =

English footballer (1880–1954)

Personal information
- Full name: Arthur Arrowsmith
- Date of birth: 1880
- Place of birth: Wolverhampton, England
- Date of death: 1954 (aged 74)
- Position: Inside right

Senior career*
Years	Team	Apps	(Gls)
1904	Compton		
1905	Coventry City		
1906–1908	Stoke	41	(8)
1908–1909	Wolverhampton Wanderers	1	(0)
1909	Willenhall Swifts		
- * Club domestic league appearances and goals

Arthur Arrowsmith (1880–1954) was an English footballer who played in the Football League for Stoke and Wolverhampton Wanderers.

== Career ==
Arrowsmith was born in Wolverhampton and played for Compton and Coventry City before joining Stoke in 1906. He was a regular in the side in 1906–07 as he scored eight goals in 37 appearances but it was a terrible season for Stoke as they were relegation from the First Division for the first time. He remained with the club in the Second Division but was sold to Wolverhampton Wanderers in January 1908. He failed to make the grade at Wolves and left for non-league Willenhall Swifts.

== Career statistics ==
Appearances and goals by club, season and competition
Club	Season	League			FA Cup		Total	
Club	Season	Division	Apps	Goals	Apps	Goals	Apps	Goals
Stoke	1906–07	First Division	34	7	3	1	37	8
Stoke	1907–08	Second Division	7	1	4	0	11	1
Stoke	Total		41	8	7	1	48	9
Wolverhampton Wanderers	1907–08	Second Division	1	0	0	0	1	0
Career total			42	8	7	1	49	9
