= John Whitehouse (footballer) =

English footballer

Personal information
- Full name: John Thomas Whitehouse
- Date of birth: 1878
- Place of birth: West Bromwich, England
- Date of death: 1933 (aged 54–55)
- Position: Right half

Senior career*
Years	Team	Apps	(Gls)
1899–1901	Wednesbury Town		
1901–1905	Wolverhampton Wanderers	147	(0)
1906	Halesowen		
1906–1907	Stoke	2	(0)
1907	Stourbridge		
1908	Bloxwich Strollers		
1909	Darlaston		
1910	Dudley		
- * Club domestic league appearances and goals

John Thomas Whitehouse (1878 – 1933) was an English footballer who played in the Football League for Stoke and Wolverhampton Wanderers.

== Career ==
Whitehouse was born in West Bromwich and played for Wednesbury Town before joining Wolverhampton Wanderers in 1901. He became a regular for Wolves at right half making over 150 appearances for the club scoring once which came in the FA Cup against Derby County in February 1904. He left Wolves in 1906 for Halesowen Town but was give the chance to remain a professional with Stoke. However, he only played two matches for Stoke in 1906–07 and went on to play for serveal non-league teams in the Birmingham area.

== Career statistics ==
Appearances and goals by club, season and competition
Club	Season	League			FA Cup		Total	
Club	Season	Division	Apps	Goals	Apps	Goals	Apps	Goals
Wolverhampton Wanderers	1901–02	First Division	32	0	1	0	33	0
Wolverhampton Wanderers	1902–03	First Division	31	0	1	0	32	0
Wolverhampton Wanderers	1903–04	First Division	34	0	4	1	38	1
Wolverhampton Wanderers	1904–05	First Division	27	0	0	0	27	0
Wolverhampton Wanderers	1905–06	First Division	23	0	2	0	25	0
Stoke	1906–07	First Division	2	0	0	0	2	0
Career total			149	0	8	1	157	1
