= Fred Rouse (footballer) =

English footballer

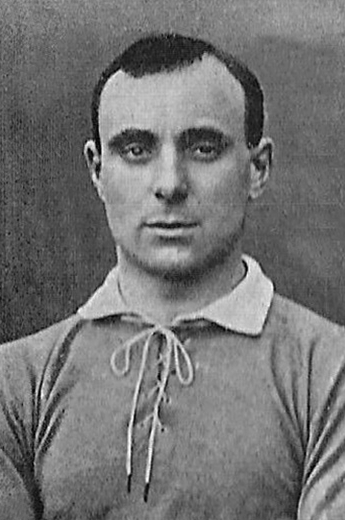
- Rouse while with Chelsea in 1907

Personal information
- Full name: Fredrick William Rouse
- Date of birth: 28 November 1881
- Place of birth: Cranford, England
- Date of death: December 1953 (aged 72)
- Place of death: Windsor, England
- Height: 5 ft 10 1/2 in (1.79 m)
- Position: Centre forward

Senior career*
Years	Team	Apps	(Gls)
1898–1900	Southall		
1900–1902	Wycombe Wanderers	32	(20)
1902	Shepherd's Bush	2	(0)
1902–1903	Brentford	0	(0)
1903–1904	Grimsby Town	37	(15)
1904–1906	Stoke	69	(26)
1906–1907	Everton	9	(2)
1907–1909	Chelsea	38	(11)
1909–1910	West Bromwich Albion	5	(2)
1910–1911	Croydon Common	26	(11)
1911–1912	Brentford	15	(5)
- Slough
Total		158	(56)

International career
1905–1906	The Football League XI	2	(1)
- * Club domestic league appearances and goals

Fredrick William Rouse (28 November 1881 – December 1953) was an English professional footballer who played as a centre forward in the Football League for Chelsea, Everton, Grimsby Town, Stoke and West Bromwich Albion. He also represented the Football League XI.

== Club career ==
A centre forward, Rouse was born in Cranford and played for London clubs Southall, Wycombe Wanderers, Brentford and Shepherds Bush, before moving north to join First Division club Grimsby Town in 1903. Despite suffering relegation to the Second Division at the end of the 1902–03 season, he impressed at the "Mariners" and earned a move to division rivals Stoke in April 1904. Rouse top-scored for the team with 12 and 10 goals during the 1904–05 and 1905–06 seasons respectively. In November 1906, financial concerns led to his sale to First Division club Everton for a £600 fee. Rouse struggled to settle at Goodison Park and returned to London to join First Division club Chelsea for a £1000 fee. After two seasons at Stamford Bridge, Rouse dropped down to the Second Division to play the 1909–10 season with West Bromwich Albion and later played for Croydon Common, Brentford and Slough.

== Representative career ==
Rouse represented the Football League XI in matches versus the Irish League XI in October 1905 and October 1906, scoring once a 6–0 victory in the latter match.

== Personal life ==
After his retirement from football, Rouse became publican of the Coach & Horses pub at Hayes Bridge.

== Career statistics ==
Appearances and goals by club, season and competition
Club	Season	League			FA Cup		Total	
Club	Season	Division	Apps	Goals	Apps	Goals	Apps	Goals
Wycombe Wanderers	1900–01	Southern League Second Division	13	12	0	0	16	13
Wycombe Wanderers	1901–02	Southern League Second Division	19	8	0	0	30	15
Wycombe Wanderers	Total		32	20	0	0	46	28
Shepherd's Bush	1901–02	Southern League Second Division	2	0	—		2	0
Grimsby Town	1902–03	First Division	6	2	—		6	2
Grimsby Town	1903–04	Second Division	31	13	2	0	33	13
Grimsby Town	Total		37	15	2	0	39	15
Stoke	1903–04	First Division	1	0	—		1	0
Stoke	1904–05	First Division	30	12	2	0	32	12
Stoke	1905–06	First Division	28	10	2	0	30	10
Stoke	1906–07	First Division	10	4	—		10	4
Stoke	Total		69	26	4	0	73	26
Everton	1906–07	First Division	6	1	1	0	7	1
Everton	1907–08	First Division	3	1	—		3	1
Everton	Total		9	2	1	0	10	2
Chelsea	1907–08	First Division	20	6	1	0	21	6
Chelsea	1908–09	First Division	18	5	3	0	21	5
Chelsea	Total		38	9	4	0	42	9
West Bromwich Albion	1909–10	Second Division	5	2	0	0	5	2
Croydon Common	1910–11	Southern League Second Division	11	6	1	0	12	6
Brentford	1911–12	Southern League First Division	15	5	2	0	17	5
Career Total			203	82	12	0	229	90

== Honours ==
Wycombe Wanderers

- Berks & Bucks Senior Cup: 1901–02
