= Louis Williams (footballer) =

English footballer

Personal information
- Full name: Louis Williams
- Date of birth: 1889
- Place of birth: Longton, Staffordshire, England
- Position: Defender

Youth career
- North Staffs Nomads

Senior career*
Years	Team	Apps	(Gls)
1907–1908	Stoke	33	(1)
1908–1909	Bradford City	10	(0)
1909–1912	Bristol Rovers	106	(1)
1912–1913	Port Vale	4	(0)
Total		153	(2)
- * Club domestic league appearances and goals

Louis Williams (born 1889; date of death unknown) was an English footballer who played for Bradford City, Bristol Rovers, Port Vale and Stoke.

== Career ==
Williams played for North Staffs Nomads, before joining league club Stoke in 1907. He played 33 games for the "Potters" in the 1907–08 season, and scored once in a 1–0 win over Stockport County at the Victoria Ground on 8 February, only to find the club resigning from the league due to financial difficulties. In 1908 he moved on to Second Division champions Bradford City and later played in the Southern League for Bristol Rovers before moving back to Staffordshire in June 1912 to join Port Vale. Williams failed to gain a regular place in a team aiming to gain re-election to the Football League and was duly released at the end of the 1912–13 season.

== Career statistics ==
Appearances and goals by club, season and competition
Club	Season	League			FA Cup		Other		Total	
Club	Season	Division	Apps	Goals	Apps	Goals	Apps	Goals	Apps	Goals
Stoke	1907–08	Second Division	33	1	3	0	0	0	36	1
Bradford City	1908–09	First Division	10	0	0	0	0	0	10	0
Port Vale	1912–13	The Central League	4	0	1	0	3	0	8	0
