= 1934–35 Port Vale F.C. season =

Port Vale F.C.
1934–35 season
- Chairman: Frank Huntbach
- Manager: Tom Holford
- Stadium: Old Recreation Ground
- Football League Second Division: 18th (34 points)
- FA Cup: Third Round (eliminated by West Bromwich Albion)
- Top goalscorer: League: Tom Nolan (16); All: Tom Nolan (16)
- Highest home attendance: 18,989 vs. West Bromwich Albion, 12 January 1935
- Lowest home attendance: 3,860 vs. Fulham, 27 April 1935
- Average home league attendance: 8,463
- Biggest win: 4–0 vs. Barnsley, 5 January 1935
- Biggest defeat: 0–8 vs. Brentford, 20 April 1935
Home colours

The 1934–35 season was Port Vale's 29th season of football in the English Football League and their fifth-successive season (28th overall) in the Second Division. While a promising start fuelled hopes of a return to the top half, Vale ultimately finished in 18th place, accumulating 34 points from a record of 11 wins, 12 draws, and 19 defeats, scoring 55 goals and conceding 74.

Under manager Tom Holford, the early season surge came to nothing as form collapsed from October onward, leaving Vale embroiled in a relegation battle before surviving comfortably on goal average. In January 1935, Vale recorded their largest win, a 4–0 victory over Barnsley, but endured their harshest reverse in April with an 8–0 home defeat to Brentford. Tom Nolan emerged as the standout player, finishing the campaign as both league and season top scorer with 16 goals in 40 appearances, in what would be his third successive season leading Vale's scoring charts.

In the FA Cup, Port Vale made a relatively brief appearance, exiting in the Third Round, consistent with recent seasons. Off the pitch, the club faced considerable upheaval: supporters and directors held a six-week consultation on a proposed name change, with ideas like "Stoke Central", "Stoke United", and "Hanley Port Vale" considered, although nothing ultimately changed. Financial constraints persisted — Vale's average attendance dipped to 8,463, with a season-low crowd of 3,860 versus Fulham on 27 April.

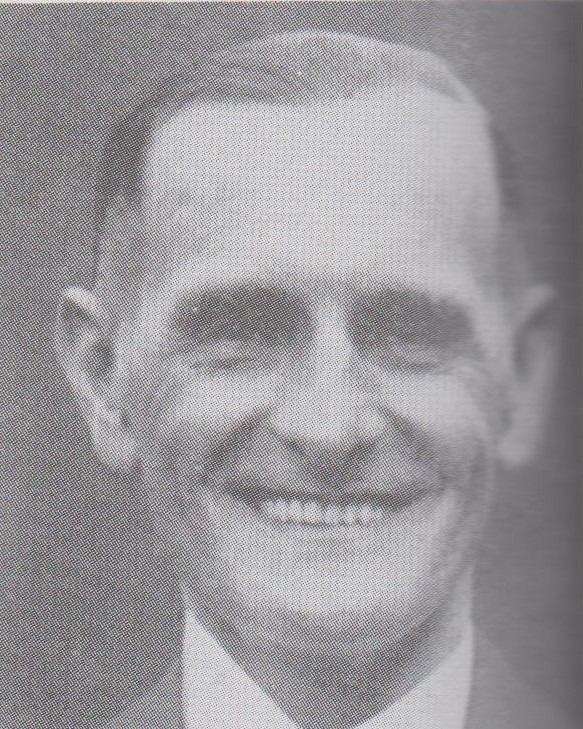
Manager Tom Holford.

Chairman Frank Huntbach declared "the prospects of this club are very bright" at the start of the campaign.

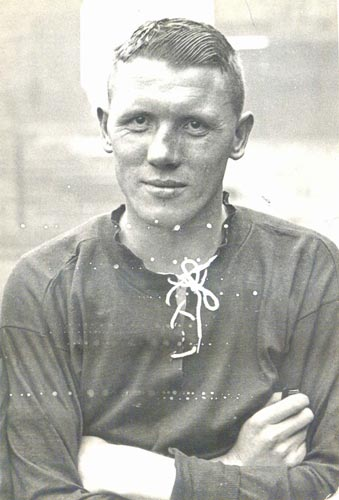
Midfielder Jack Round.

== Overview ==
=== Second Division ===
The pre-season saw the arrival of eight new signings, the most significant of these were: 'safe as houses' goalkeeper John Potts (Leeds United), 'outstanding' outside-right John Friar (Bournemouth & Boscombe Athletic), inside-left David Galloway (Preston North End), and centre-half Joe Craven (Swansea Town).

The season started with just one defeat in the opening eight games, leaving the club in fourth place by the end of September – mostly down to the goalscoring partnership of Friar and Nolan. Home victories over Sheffield United, Southampton, Manchester United, and Burnley nevertheless saw attendances of only 7,311 to 11,975. Following this they went on a run of twelve games without a win, with an over-reliance on Friar and Nolan in attack, whilst the defence lacked understanding. The team was changed around but to no avail, as they slipped down the league towards a relegation battle. On 24 November, Vale lost 2–1 at home to second-from-bottom Hull City. In the middle of December Friar was sold to Preston North End, having scored ten goals in 18 games, with the 'more steady' Ted Critchley heading in the other direction. Vale fell to third-from-bottom following a 1–1 draw with Bradford (Park Avenue) on 22 December. Their poor form was halted with a Christmas day victory over Bradford City, the club's first win since September. The team were then inconsistent until the end of the season.

The 2 February matchday programme (for a 2–1 victory over Swansea) recorded a discussion on whether or not the club should change its name. Concluding that many people didn't know where Port Vale was, Stoke Central and Stoke United were put forward as possible new names. A discussion with the fans resulted in Stoke United being decided as the best alternative, despite calls from some for the name Hanley to be included. On 2 March (a 1–1 draw with Norwich City), each supporter was given a ballot slip upon entering the Old Recreation Ground, with the result of the poll being that 3,737 were in favour of a change of name, and 3,633 opposed a change. A shareholders' meeting on 18 March at the Grand Hotel (Hanley) saw the directors suggest the name of Stoke North End to the 100 members present. Finding little support, a resolution was instead passed for the new name of Hanley Port Vale. The Football League forced them to wait until the end of the season to implement a name change, having already printed countless papers with the original name. However, the new name proved unpopular with the public, who criticised the club for being too parochial and lacking civic pride. The name change never occurred.

Back on the pitch, the team were bobbing along, picking up enough points to avoid relegation concerns – whereas Oldham Athletic and Notts County were rapidly drifting away from safety. On 9 March at St James' Park the Vale picked up a shock result by beating promotion hopefuls Newcastle United 2–1 – their first away win in 24 attempts, ending a run going back to January 1934. Nolan's stand-in James Baker bagged both of the goals. On 19 April, a 5–3 beating of Notts County proved enough to guarantee safety, yet Vale still earned just two points from their final four games. On 20 April, they lost a massive 8–0 to champions Brentford – the biggest defeat in the division that season.

They finished 18th with 34 points, eight points clear of relegation and 22 points short of promotion. Away from home, they recorded just one win, whilst in front of goal, their 55 goals scored was their lowest total since 1925 (after which the offside rule had been changed to make scoring easier). Tom Nolan's 16 goals and the departed John Friar's ten goals were the only significant contributions.

=== Finances ===
On the financial side, a mere £11,120 was made on the gates, though a £3,775 credit on transfers ensured a profit of £2,415. Only 14 players were retained, with those leaving including: James Baker (Barrow), Bob Morton (Throckley Welfare), Jack Blackwell (Boston United), Joe Craven (Newport County), David Galloway (Carlisle United), Ted Critchley (South Liverpool), and 128 game veteran Jack Round (also Carlisle).

=== FA Cup ===
In the FA Cup, Vale were defeated 2–1 by eventual runners-up West Bromwich Albion of the First Division at The Hawthorns. The 18,989 crowd saw £1,000 raised in gate receipts, and a comeback from the "Throstles" just six minutes from time.

== Results ==
=== Football League Second Division ===
==== League table ====
Pos	Team	Pld	W	D	L	GF	GA	GAv	Pts
16	Barnsley	42	13	12	17	60	83	0.723	38
17	Swansea Town	42	14	8	20	56	67	0.836	36
18	Port Vale	42	11	12	19	55	74	0.743	34
19	Southampton	42	11	12	19	46	75	0.613	34
20	Bradford City	42	12	8	22	50	68	0.735	32

Rules for classification: 1) Points; 2) Goal average; 3) Goals scored

==== Results by matchday ====
Round	1	2	3	4	5	6	7	8	9	10	11	12	13	14	15	16	17	18	19	20	21	22	23	24	25	26	27	28	29	30	31	32	33	34	35	36	37	38	39	40	41	42
Ground	H	A	A	H	H	H	A	H	A	H	A	H	A	H	A	H	A	H	A	H	H	A	A	H	A	H	A	A	H	A	H	A	H	A	H	A	H	H	A	A	H	A
Result	W	D	L	W	D	W	D	W	L	L	D	L	L	D	L	L	L	D	L	D	W	L	L	W	L	W	L	D	W	L	D	W	D	L	L	L	W	W	L	L	D	D
Position	1	4	11	4	5	4	4	4	5	10	9	12	13	14	15	18	18	18	19	20	16	18	19	19	19	18	18	18	17	18	17	17	16	17	19	19	18	17	17	18	19	18
Points	2	3	3	5	6	8	9	11	11	11	12	12	12	13	13	13	13	14	14	15	17	17	17	19	19	21	21	22	24	24	25	27	28	28	28	28	30	32	32	32	33	34

Source: Statto
A = Away; H = Home; W = Win; D = Draw; L = Loss

==== Matches ====
25 August 1934 1	Port Vale	2–0	Sheffield United	Hanley
	Nolan; Friar	Report		Stadium: Old Recreation Ground; Attendance: 11,975

27 August 1934 2	Southampton	0–0	Port Vale	Southampton
		Report		Stadium: The Dell; Attendance: 6,977

1 September 1934 3	Barnsley	2–0	Port Vale	Barnsley
		Report		Stadium: Oakwell; Attendance: 9,370

3 September 1934 4	Port Vale	4–1	Southampton	Hanley
	Friar; Nolan; Morton	Report	Fishlock	Stadium: Old Recreation Ground; Attendance: 7,746

8 September 1934 5	Port Vale	2–2	Plymouth Argyle	Hanley
	Nolan	Report	Cookson	Stadium: Old Recreation Ground; Attendance: 10,133

15 September 1934 6	Port Vale	3–2	Manchester United	Hanley
	Friar (pen.); Nolan	Report	Mutch; Jones	Stadium: Old Recreation Ground; Attendance: 9,037

22 September 1934 7	Swansea Town	1–1	Port Vale	Swansea
		Report	Nolan	Stadium: Vetch Field; Attendance: 5,698

29 September 1934 8	Port Vale	3–1	Burnley	Hanley
	Friar; Nolan	Report		Stadium: Old Recreation Ground; Attendance: 7,311

6 October 1934 9	Oldham Athletic	2–0	Port Vale	Oldham
		Report		Stadium: Boundary Park; Attendance: 6,069

13 October 1934 10	Port Vale	1–3	Bolton Wanderers	Hanley
	Nolan	Report		Stadium: Old Recreation Ground; Attendance: 16,839

20 October 1934 11	Norwich City	0–0	Port Vale	Norwich
		Report		Stadium: The Nest; Attendance: 14,195

27 October 1934 12	Port Vale	1–3	Newcastle United	Hanley
	Rhodes 47'	Report	Smith 27', 80'; Murray 56'	Stadium: Old Recreation Ground; Attendance: 11,036; Referee: C. Booth

3 November 1934 13	West Ham United	3–1	Port Vale	Upton Park, London
	Ruffell; Mills	Report	Rhodes	Stadium: Boleyn Ground; Attendance: 19,391

10 November 1934 14	Port Vale	2–2	Blackpool	Hanley
	Gunn; Rhodes	Report		Stadium: Old Recreation Ground; Attendance: 7,656

17 November 1934 15	Bury	3–1	Port Vale	Bury, Greater Manchester
		Report	Friar	Stadium: Gigg Lane; Attendance: 8,278

24 November 1934 16	Port Vale	1–2	Hull City	Hanley
14:35 GMT	Friar	Report	Hubbard 69'; Duncan 73'	Stadium: Old Recreation Ground; Attendance: 6,086

1 December 1934 17	Nottingham Forest	2–0	Port Vale	West Bridgford
15:00 GMT	Dent 43'; Race 89'	Report		Stadium: City Ground; Attendance: 13,576; Referee: H Dedman

8 December 1934 18	Port Vale	2–2	Brentford	Hanley
	Friar; Nolan	Report	Hopkins; Robson (pen.)	Stadium: Old Recreation Ground; Attendance: 8,054

15 December 1934 19	Fulham	2–0	Port Vale	Fulham, West London
		Report		Stadium: Craven Cottage; Attendance: 8,138

22 December 1934 20	Port Vale	1–1	Bradford (Park Avenue)	Hanley
	Morton	Report		Stadium: Old Recreation Ground; Attendance: 6,251

25 December 1934 21	Port Vale	1–0	Bradford City	Hanley
	Nolan	Report		Stadium: Old Recreation Ground; Attendance: 8,436

26 December 1934 22	Bradford City	3–0	Port Vale	Bradford
		Report		Stadium: Valley Parade; Attendance: 13,727

29 December 1934 23	Sheffield United	3–0	Port Vale	Sheffield
		Report		Stadium: Bramall Lane; Attendance: 16,520

5 January 1935 24	Port Vale	4–0	Barnsley	Hanley
	Rhodes; Morton; Mitcheson; Blackwell	Report		Stadium: Old Recreation Ground; Attendance: 6,074

19 January 1935 25	Plymouth Argyle	2–1	Port Vale	Plymouth
	Briggs	Report	Rhodes	Stadium: Home Park; Attendance: 14,051

2 February 1935 26	Port Vale	2–1	Swansea Town	Hanley
	Nolan	Report		Stadium: Old Recreation Ground; Attendance: 7,081

6 February 1935 27	Manchester United	2–1	Port Vale	Old Trafford
	Jones; Rowley	Report	Rhodes	Stadium: Old Trafford; Attendance: 7,372

9 February 1935 28	Burnley	2–2	Port Vale	Burnley
		Report	Dean	Stadium: Turf Moor; Attendance: 9,830

16 February 1935 29	Port Vale	2–0	Oldham Athletic	Hanley
	Dean; Critchley	Report		Stadium: Old Recreation Ground; Attendance: 5,473

23 February 1935 30	Bolton Wanderers	2–0	Port Vale	Bolton
		Report		Stadium: Burnden Park; Attendance: 18,897

2 March 1935 31	Port Vale	1–1	Norwich City	Hanley
	Morton	Report		Stadium: Old Recreation Ground; Attendance: 8,284

9 March 1935 32	Newcastle United	1–2	Port Vale	Newcastle upon Tyne
	Pearson 43'	Report	Baker 25', 50'	Stadium: St James' Park; Attendance: 23,934; Referee: C. Booth

16 March 1935 33	Port Vale	2–2	West Ham United	Hanley
	Baker; Mitcheson	Report	Mangnall; Marshall	Stadium: Old Recreation Ground; Attendance: 12,853

23 March 1935 34	Blackpool	3–1	Port Vale	Blackpool
		Report	Baker	Stadium: Bloomfield Road; Attendance: 7,268

30 March 1935 35	Port Vale	0–1	Bury	Hanley
		Report		Stadium: Old Recreation Ground; Attendance: 7,869

6 April 1935 36	Hull City	1–0	Port Vale	Kingston upon Hull
15:15 BST		Report	Pinkerton 25'	Stadium: Anlaby Road; Attendance: 3,569

13 April 1935 37	Port Vale	2–0	Nottingham Forest	Hanley
15:00 GMT	Nolan	Report		Stadium: Old Recreation Ground; Attendance: 6,389; Referee: HE Hull

19 April 1935 38	Port Vale	5–3	Notts County	Hanley
	Birks; Mitcheson; Nolan	Report		Stadium: Old Recreation Ground; Attendance: 9,010

20 April 1935 39	Brentford	8–0	Port Vale	Brentford, West London
	Holliday; Robson; Burns; Hopkins	Report		Stadium: Griffin Park; Attendance: 18,194

22 April 1935 40	Notts County	3–2	Port Vale	Nottingham
		Report	Blackwell; Nolan	Stadium: Meadow Lane; Attendance: 6,765

27 April 1935 41	Port Vale	1–1	Fulham	Hanley
	Birks	Report		Stadium: Old Recreation Ground; Attendance: 3,860

4 May 1935 42	Bradford (Park Avenue)	1–1	Port Vale	Bradford
		Report	Birks	Stadium: Park Avenue; Attendance: 3,634

=== FA Cup ===
12 January 1935 R3	West Bromwich Albion	2–1	Port Vale	West Bromwich
		Report	Morton	Stadium: The Hawthorns; Attendance: 18,989

== Squad statistics ==
=== Appearances and goals ===
Key to positions: GK – Goalkeeper; FB – Full back; HB – Half back; FW – Forward

No.	Pos	Nat	Player	Total		Second Division		FA Cup	
No.	Pos	Nat	Player	Apps	Goals	Apps	Goals	Apps	Goals
	GK	(England) ENG	John Potts	43	0	42	0	1	0
	FB	(England) ENG	Ernest Breeze	26	0	25	0	1	0
	FB	(England) ENG	George Shenton	15	0	15	0	0	0
	FB	(England) ENG	Percy Thorpe	1	0	1	0	0	0
	FB	(England) ENG	Jack Vickers	27	0	26	0	1	0
	HB	(England) ENG	Cliff Birks	11	4	11	4	0	0
	HB	(England) ENG	Sam Briddon	0	0	0	0	0	0
	HB	(England) ENG	Joe Craven	11	0	11	0	0	0
	HB	(Scotland) SCO	Ken Gunn	31	1	31	1	0	0
	HB	(England) ENG	Eric Hayward	4	0	4	0	0	0
	HB	(England) ENG	Roger Jones	30	0	29	0	1	0
	HB	(Scotland) SCO	Jim Kelso	15	0	15	0	0	0
	HB	(England) ENG	Trevor Rhodes	36	6	35	6	1	0
	HB	(England) ENG	Jack Round	27	0	26	0	1	0
	FW	(England) ENG	James Baker	9	4	9	4	0	0
	FW	(England) ENG	Jack Blackwell	13	2	12	2	1	0
	FW	(England) ENG	Arthur Caldwell	1	0	1	0	0	0
	FW	(England) ENG	Ted Critchley	19	1	18	1	1	0
	FW	(England) ENG	Luke Dean	10	3	10	3	0	0
	FW	(Scotland) SCO	David Galloway	12	0	12	0	0	0
	FW	(England) ENG	Fred Mitcheson	32	4	31	4	1	0
	FW	(England) ENG	Bob Morton	36	5	35	4	1	1
	FW	(England) ENG	Tom Nolan	40	16	39	16	1	0
	FW	(England) ENG	Albert Purcell	2	0	2	0	0	0
	FW	(England) ENG	Albert Titley	4	0	4	0	0	0
Players who featured but departed the club during the season:
	FW	(Scotland) SCO	John Friar	18	10	18	10	0	0

=== Top scorers ===
Place	Position	Nation	Name	Second Division	FA Cup	Total
1	FW	England	Tom Nolan	16	0	16
2	FW	Scotland	John Friar	10	0	10
3	HB	England	Trevor Rhodes	6	0	6
4	FW	England	Bob Morton	4	1	5
5	HB	England	Cliff Birks	4	0	4
–	FW	England	Fred Mitcheson	4	0	4
–	FW	England	James Baker	4	0	4
8	FW	England	Luke Dean	3	0	3
9	FW	England	Jack Blackwell	2	0	2
10	HB	Scotland	Ken Gunn	1	0	1
–	FW	England	Ted Critchley	1	0	1
–	–	–	Own goals	0	0	0
			TOTALS	55	1	56

== Transfers ==
=== Transfers in ===
Date from	Position	Nationality	Name	From	Fee	Ref.
May 1934	GK	ENG	John Potts	Leeds United	Free transfer	
May 1934	FW	ENG	Albert Titley	West Bromwich Albion	Free transfer	
June 1934	FW	ENG	James Baker	Charlton Athletic	Free transfer	
June 1934	HB	ENG	Joe Craven	Swansea Town	Free transfer	
June 1934	FW	SCO	David Galloway	Preston North End	Free transfer	
June 1934	HB	SCO	Jim Kelso	Bradford Park Avenue	Free transfer	
July 1934	FW	SCO	John Friar	Bournemouth & Boscombe Athletic	Free transfer	
July 1934	HB	ENG	Eric Hayward	Hanley and Wardle's	Free transfer	
August 1934	FW	ENG	Luke Dean	Downing's Tileries	Free transfer	
November 1934	FB	ENG	Percy Thorpe	Accrington Stanley	Free transfer	
December 1934	FW	ENG	Ted Critchley	Preston North End	Exchange	
May 1935	FW	ENG	Arthur Caldwell	Winsford United	Free transfer	

=== Transfers out ===
Date from	Position	Nationality	Name	To	Fee	Ref.
December 1934	FW	SCO	John Friar	Preston North End	Exchange	
May 1935	FW	ENG	Jack Blackwell	Boston United	Released	
May 1935	HB	SCO	Jim Kelso	Newport County	Free transfer	
May 1935	FW	ENG	Albert Titley	Macclesfield Town	Free transfer	
July 1935	FW	ENG	Tom Nolan	Bradford Park Avenue	Free transfer	
Summer 1935	HB	ENG	Joe Craven	Newport County	Free transfer	
Summer 1935	FW	ENG	Ted Critchley	South Liverpool	Released	
Summer 1935	FW	SCO	David Galloway	Carlisle United	Free transfer	
Summer 1935	FW	ENG	Bob Morton	Throckley Welfare	Free transfer	
Summer 1935	FW	ENG	Albert Purcell		Released	
Summer 1935	FB	ENG	Percy Thorpe		Released	
