= Freddie Brown (footballer) =

English footballer

Personal information
- Full name: James Fredrick Brown
- Date of birth: 1886
- Place of birth: Brierley Hill, England
- Date of death: 1939 (aged 53)
- Position: Inside right

Senior career*
Years	Team	Apps	(Gls)
1905	Kidderminster Harriers		
1906–1907	Stoke	23	(8)
1908–1909	West Bromwich Albion	8	(1)
1910	Kidderminster Harriers		
1911	Willenhall Swifts		
Total		31	(9)
- * Club domestic league appearances and goals

James Fredrick Brown (1886 – 1939) was an English footballer who played in the Football League for Stoke and West Bromwich Albion.

== Career ==
Brown was born in Brierley Hill and started his career at non-league Kidderminster Harriers before he joined League side Stoke in 1906. He played as an inside forward playing in 28 games scoring 11 goals. When Stoke left the league Brown joined West Bromwich Albion scoring once in eight matches and then re-joined Kidderminster Harriers and played for Willenhall Swifts.

== Career statistics ==
Appearances and goals by club, season and competition
Club	Season	League			FA Cup		Total	
Club	Season	Division	Apps	Goals	Apps	Goals	Apps	Goals
Stoke	1906–07	First Division	4	0	0	0	4	0
Stoke	1907–08	Second Division	19	8	6	3	25	11
West Bromwich Albion	1908–09	Second Division	7	1	0	0	7	1
West Bromwich Albion	1909–10	Second Division	1	0	0	0	1	0
Career total			31	9	6	3	37	12
