= Fred Mitcheson =

English footballer

Personal information
- Full name: Frederick Mitcheson
- Date of birth: 20 March 1912
- Place of birth: Westerhope, England
- Date of death: 1994 (aged 81–82)
- Place of death: Torbay, England
- Height: 5 ft 7 1/2 in (1.71 m)
- Position: Inside forward

Youth career
- Wolverhampton Wanderers

Senior career*
Years	Team	Apps	(Gls)
1933–1935	Port Vale	49	(8)
1935–1939	Plymouth Argyle	93	(25)
1939–1946	Ipswich Town	0	(0)
194?–19??	Yeovil Town		
Total		142+	(33+)
- * Club domestic league appearances and goals

Frederick Mitcheson (20 March 1912 – 1994) was an English footballer who played at inside-forward.

== Career ==
Mitcheson was on the books at Wolverhampton Wanderers before joining Port Vale in July 1933. He scored a hat-trick on his debut on 21 April 1934, a 4–0 win over Plymouth Argyle at the Old Recreation Ground, as the 1933–34 season drew to a close; scoring all three goals in just three minutes, this was the quickest hat-trick in the club's history. He scored four goals in 31 Second Division appearances in 1934–35. He hit just one goal in 15 games in 1935–36, before he was sold to Bob Jack's Plymouth Argyle in November 1935. He spent five years at Plymouth, scoring a hat-trick in January 1939 in a 4–3 win at Luton Town. After leaving Home Park he played for Ipswich Town and Yeovil Town. He returned to Plymouth Argyle in 1948 to help the training and ground staff.

== Career statistics ==
Appearances and goals by club, season and competition
Club	Season	League			FA Cup		Other		Total	
Club	Season	Division	Apps	Goals	Apps	Goals	Apps	Goals	Apps	Goals
Port Vale	1933–34	Second Division	3	3	0	0	0	0	3	3
Port Vale	1934–35	Second Division	31	4	1	0	0	0	32	4
Port Vale	1935–36	Second Division	15	1	0	0	0	0	15	1
Port Vale	Total		49	8	1	0	0	0	50	8
Plymouth Argyle	1935–36	Second Division	21	8	2	0	0	0	23	8
Plymouth Argyle	1936–37	Second Division	29	9	2	0	0	0	31	9
Plymouth Argyle	1937–38	Second Division	21	4	1	0	0	0	22	4
Plymouth Argyle	1938–39	Second Division	22	4	1	0	0	0	23	4
Plymouth Argyle	Total		93	25	6	0	0	0	99	25
Ipswich Town	1939–40		0	0	0	0	3	1	3	1
Career total			142	33	7	0	3	1	152	34
