= Thomas Usherwood =

Thomas Edward Usherwood (24 December 1841 – 9 February 1939) was Archdeacon of Maritzburg from 1878 to 1887.

Fogg was educated at Queens' College, Cambridge After Curacies in Leeds, Uffington and High Ercall he went out to South Africa in 1874. On his return to England in 1902 he held incumbencies at Chaldon Herring then Coombe Keynes.
