= Wattie Wilson =

Scottish footballer (1879–1926)

Personal information
- Full name: Walter Wilson
- Date of birth: 4 November 1879
- Place of birth: Armadale, West Lothian, Scotland
- Date of death: 1926 (aged 47)
- Height: 5 ft 10 in (1.78 m)
- Position: Full back

Senior career*
Years	Team	Apps	(Gls)
1907–1914	Lincoln City	171	(6)
- * Club domestic league appearances and goals

Walter "Wattie" Wilson (4 November 1879–1926) was a Scottish footballer who played in the English Football League for Lincoln City.
