= Len Williams (footballer) =

English footballer (1898–1932)

Personal information
- Full name: Leonard Horace Williams
- Date of birth: 17 May 1898
- Place of birth: Dalton, Yorkshire, England
- Date of death: 1932 (aged 33–34)
- Position: Full-back

Senior career*
| Years | Team | Apps | (Gls) |
| 1921–1922 | Silverwood Colliery | | |
| 1922–1923 | Wath Athletic | | |
| 1923–1926 | Sheffield Wednesday | 9 | (0) |
| 1926–1927 | Stockport County | 39 | (0) |
| 1927–1930 | Wolverhampton Wanderers | 52 | (0) |
| 1930–1931 | Swansea Town | 42 | (0) |
| 1931 | Wellington Town | | |
| 1931 | Oswestry Town | | |
| Total | | 142 | (0) |
- * Club domestic league appearances and goals

Leonard Horace Williams (17 May 1898 – 1932) was an English footballer who played in the Football League for Sheffield Wednesday, Stockport County, Swansea Town and Wolverhampton Wanderers.
