= Arthur Usherwood =

English footballer

Personal information
- Full name: Arthur Usherwood
- Date of birth: 1884
- Place of birth: Congleton, England
- Date of death: 1961 (aged 83)
- Position: Centre forward

Senior career*
Years	Team	Apps	(Gls)
1903	Congleton Excelsior		
1904–1905	Stoke	6	(1)
1905	Ashton Town		
- * Club domestic league appearances and goals

Arthur Usherwood (1884 – 1961) was an English footballer who played in the Football League for Stoke.

== Career ==
Usherwood played amateur football with Congleton Excelsior before moving to Stoke in 1904. He played six times for Stoke during the 1904–05 season scoring once in a 4–0 win over Blackburn Rovers in January 1905. At the end of the season he returned to amateur football with Ashton Town.

== Career statistics ==
Club	Season	League			FA Cup		Total	
Club	Season	Division	Apps	Goals	Apps	Goals	Apps	Goals
Stoke	1904–05	First Division	6	1	0	0	6	1
Career Total			6	1	0	0	6	1
