= 1931–32 Hibernian F.C. season =

Hibernian
1931–32 season
- Manager: Bobby Templeton
- Scottish Second Division: 7th
- Scottish Cup: R1
- Average home league attendance: 4,052 (down 5,106)
Home colours

During the 1931–32 season Hibernian, a football club based in Edinburgh, finished seventh out of 20 clubs in the Scottish Second Division.

== Scottish Second Division ==
Match Day	Date	Opponent	H/A	Score	Hibernian Scorer(s)	Attendance
1	8 August	Alloa Athletic	H	1–0		3,000
2	15 August	Forfar Athletic	A	0–1		3,000
3	18 August	Arbroath	H	3–1		3,000
4	22 August	St Johnstone	H	6–0		5,000
5	29 August	Stenhousemuir	A	1–2		3,000
6	2 September	Dunfermline Athletic	H	6–2		5,000
7	5 September	St Bernard's	H	2–4		8,000
8	12 September	Armadale	A	1–1		2,000
9	19 September	Montrose	H	0–0		6,000
10	26 September	Raith Rovers	A	1–2		5,000
11	3 October	East Stirlingshire	H	1–1		5,000
12	10 October	Edinburgh City	A	4–0		5,000
13	17 October	East Fife	H	3–2		5,000
14	24 October	Bo'ness	A	2–2		3,000
15	31 October	Brechin City	H	4–0		3,000
16	7 November	Dumbarton	A	2–0		1,200
17	14 November	Albion Rovers	H	4–1		4,000
18	21 November	King's Park	A	4–1		3,000
19	28 November	Queen of the South	H	1–4		2,000
20	5 December	Arbroath	A	3–3		1,200
21	19 December	Alloa Athletic	A	1–2		2,000
22	26 December	Forfar Athletic	H	5–1		3,000
23	1 January	St Bernard's	A	0–1		10,000
24	2 January	Armadale	H	1–0		5,000
25	9 January	St Johnstone	A	3–1		3,500
26	23 January	Stenhousemuir	H	0–2		5,000
27	30 January	Montrose	A	1–0		1,200
28	6 February	Raith Rovers	H	0–1		6,000
29	13 February	East Stirlingshire	A	1–4		3,000
30	20 February	Edinburgh City	H	3–1		4,000
31	27 February	East Fife	A	1–1		3,000
32	5 March	Bo'ness	H	2–1		1,500
33	12 March	Brechin City	A	3–3		1,500
34	19 March	Dumbarton	H	0–1		2,000
35	26 March	Albion Rovers	A	0–1		2,000
36	2 April	King's Park	H	2–1		1,500
37	9 April	Queen of the South	A	3–2		3,000
38	16 April	Dunfermline Athletic	A	1–1		1,000

=== Final League table ===
P	Team	Pld	W	D	L	GF	GA	GD	Pts
6	Forfar Athletic	38	19	7	12	90	79	11	45
7	Hibernian	38	18	8	12	73	52	21	44
8	East Fife	38	18	5	15	107	77	30	41

=== Scottish Cup ===
Round	Date	Opponent	H/A	Score	Hibernian Scorer(s)	Attendance
R1	16 January	Dundee United	H	2–3		14,340

== See also ==
- List of Hibernian F.C. seasons
