= Ted Critchley =

English footballer (1903–1996)

Personal information
- Full name: Edward Critchley
- Date of birth: 31 December 1903
- Place of birth: Ashton-under-Lyne, England
- Date of death: 1996 (aged 92–93)
- Place of death: Stockport, England
- Height: 5 ft 8 1/2 in (1.74 m)
- Position: Outside right

Youth career
- Spring Gardens
- Stockport Union Chapel
- Cheadle

Senior career*
Years	Team	Apps	(Gls)
- Witton Albion
- Stalybridge Celtic
1922–1926	Stockport County	118	(10)
1926–1934	Everton	217	(37)
1934	Preston North End	11	(1)
1934–1935	Port Vale	18	(1)
- South Liverpool
- Macclesfield
Total		364	(49)
- * Club domestic league appearances and goals

Edward Critchley (31 December 1903 – 1996) was an English footballer. A First Division championship winner with Everton, he has been described as "the finest 'homegrown' player ever produced by Stockport County".

== Career ==
=== Stockport County ===
Critchley played local football for Spring Gardens, Stockport Union Chapel, Cheadle and Witton Albion before joining Stockport County via Stalybridge Celtic in 1922. He made his debut on 9 December 1922, in a 2–0 defeat to Port Vale at the Old Recreation Ground. His second appearance came on the last day of the 1922–23 season, as the "Hatters" secured their Second Division status with a 3–0 win over Southampton at Edgeley Park. County retained their second-tier status in 1923–24 and 1924–25, before finishing at the bottom of the division in 1925–26. He was too good a player to remain in the Third Division North for long in 1926–27. He played 118 games for County before being transferred to Everton for a £2,500 fee in December 1926.

=== Everton ===
In his first game for the "Toffees", he provided the crosses for Dixie Dean to score four goals in a 5–4 win against Sunderland. In his first full season at Goodison Park, 1927–28, Everton won the First Division league title. He provided many of the passes that enabled Dixie Dean's record-breaking 60 goals. However, Everton dropped to 18th in 1928–29, before being relegated in last place in 1929–30. Everton then won the Second Division championship in 1930–31, and won the First Division title again in 1931–32. They dropped to 11th in 1932–33, and Critchley missed the FA Cup final victory over Manchester City at Wembley after he had scored the winning goal in the semi-final victory over West Ham United, with Albert Geldard selected ahead of him for the final. The 1933–34 season was his last for Everton. Critchley scored 42 goals in 230 games for Everton before being transferred to Preston North End in 1934.

=== Later career ===
After playing in the first 11 games of the season, he lost his place in the Preston team. He was transferred to Port Vale with cash in exchange for John Friar in December 1934. However, he lost his place in the Vale team in early April 1935, and was released at the end of the season and moved on to South Liverpool.

== Career statistics ==
Appearances and goals by club, season and competition
Club	Season	League			FA Cup		Other		Total	
Club	Season	Division	Apps	Goals	Apps	Goals	Apps	Goals	Apps	Goals
Stockport County	1922–23	Second Division	2	0	0	0	0	0	2	0
Stockport County	1923–24	Second Division	37	4	2	0	0	0	39	4
Stockport County	1924–25	Second Division	25	1	2	0	0	0	27	1
Stockport County	1925–26	Second Division	38	3	1	0	0	0	39	3
Stockport County	1926–27	Third Division North	16	2	1	0	0	0	17	2
Stockport County	Total		118	10	6	0	0	0	124	10
Everton	1926–27	First Division	15	0	0	0	0	0	15	0
Everton	1927–28	First Division	40	6	2	0	0	0	42	6
Everton	1928–29	First Division	25	1	0	0	0	0	25	1
Everton	1929–30	First Division	30	4	2	2	0	0	32	6
Everton	1930–31	Second Division	37	13	4	2	0	0	41	15
Everton	1931–32	First Division	37	8	1	0	0	0	38	8
Everton	1932–33	First Division	17	2	2	1	1	0	20	3
Everton	1933–34	First Division	16	3	1	0	0	0	17	3
Everton	Total		217	37	12	5	1	0	230	42
Preston North End	1934–35	First Division	11	1	0	0	0	0	11	1
Port Vale	1934–35	Second Division	18	1	1	0	0	0	19	1
Career total			364	49	19	5	1	0	384	54

== Honours ==
Everton

- FA Community Shield: 1928 & 1932
- Football League First Division: 1927–28 & 1931–32
- Football League Second Division: 1930–31
