= Trevor Rhodes (footballer, born 1909) =

English footballer (1909–1993)

Personal information
- Full name: William Trevor Rhodes
- Date of birth: 10 November 1909
- Place of birth: Leeds, England
- Date of death: 23 May 1993 (aged 83)
- Place of death: Leeds, England
- Height: 5 ft 8 in (1.73 m)
- Positions: Right-half; inside right

Youth career
- Yorkshire Amateur

Senior career*
Years	Team	Apps	(Gls)
1928–1933	Bradford Park Avenue	57	(39)
1933–1938	Port Vale	139	(28)
Total		196	(67)
- * Club domestic league appearances and goals

William Trevor Rhodes (10 November 1909 – 23 May 1993) was an English footballer who played 147 games for Port Vale between 1933 and 1938, having previously represented Yorkshire Amateur and Bradford Park Avenue. Able to play as a right-half or at inside-right, he was noted for his pace and shot power.

== Career ==
Rhodes played for Yorkshire Amateur and Bradford Park Avenue before joining Port Vale in June 1933. He scored his first goal for the "Valiants" on 11 September, in a 3–0 win over Bury at Gigg Lane. He went on to score a hat-trick on 6 January, in a 4–1 win over Southampton at The Dell. This made him the last non-striker to score a hat-trick for the club until Louis Dodds in 2011. He finished the 1933–34 campaign with 11 goals in 31 appearances. He went on to score six goals in 36 games in 1934–35. He hit seven goals in 30 appearances in the 1935–36 season, including the winner against First Division champions Sunderland in an FA Cup third round replay at the Old Recreation Ground. Despite such cup exploits, Vale suffered relegation out of the Second Division. Rhodes bagged five goals in 36 games in 1936–37, as Vale struggled to adapt to life in the Third Division North. Rhodes lost his first-team place through injury in November 1937, and went on to play just 14 games in the 1937–38 campaign. With 29 goals in 147 league and cup games, he was released from his contract in the summer.

== Career statistics ==
Appearances and goals by club, season and competition
Club	Season	League			FA Cup		Other		Total	
Club	Season	Division	Apps	Goals	Apps	Goals	Apps	Goals	Apps	Goals
Bradford Park Avenue	1928–29	Second Division	4	2	0	0	0	0	4	2
Bradford Park Avenue	1929–30	Second Division	6	4	0	0	0	0	6	4
Bradford Park Avenue	1930–31	Second Division	21	19	3	1	0	0	24	20
Bradford Park Avenue	1931–32	Second Division	17	11	1	1	0	0	18	12
Bradford Park Avenue	1932–33	Second Division	9	3	0	0	0	0	9	3
Bradford Park Avenue	Total		57	39	4	2	0	0	61	41
Port Vale	1933–34	Second Division	30	11	1	0	0	0	31	11
Port Vale	1934–35	Second Division	35	6	1	0	0	0	36	6
Port Vale	1935–36	Second Division	28	6	2	1	0	0	30	7
Port Vale	1936–37	Third Division North	33	5	0	0	3	0	36	5
Port Vale	1937–38	Third Division North	13	0	0	0	1	0	14	0
Port Vale	Total		139	28	4	1	4	0	147	29
Career total			196	67	8	3	4	0	208	70
