= 1929–30 Bradford City A.F.C. season =

Bradford City A.F.C.
1929–30 season
- Manager: Peter O'Rourke
- Ground: Valley Parade
- Second Division: 18th
- FA Cup: Fifth round

The 1929–30 Bradford City A.F.C. season was the 23rd in the club's history.

The club finished 18th in Division Two, and reached the 5th round of the FA Cup.

== Sources ==
- Frost, Terry (1988). Bradford City A Complete Record 1903-1988. Breedon Books Sport. ISBN 0-907969-38-0.
