= Isaiah Turner (footballer) =

English footballer

Personal information
- Full name: Isaiah Turner
- Date of birth: July 1876
- Place of birth: Netherton, England
- Date of death: 1936 (aged 60)
- Position: Goalkeeper

Senior career*
Years	Team	Apps	(Gls)
1897	Dudley St James		
1898–1899	West Bromwich Albion	1	(0)
1899–1902	Stourbridge		
1902–1904	Dudley Town		
1904–1906	Kidderminster Harriers		
1906–1907	Stoke	7	(0)
1907	Worcester City		
1908	Old Hill Wanderers		
- * Club domestic league appearances and goals

Isaiah Turner (1876 – 1936) was an English footballer who played in the Football League for Stoke and West Bromwich Albion.

== Career ==
Turner played for Dudley St James before playing in a Football League match for West Bromwich Albion in 1898. Afterwards he spent time playing for Stourbridge, Dudley Town and Kidderminster Harriers before re-entering league football with Stoke in 1906. Turner played in seven league matches for Stoke during the 1906–07 as the club were relegated. He left at the end of the season and went on to play for Worcester City and Old Hill Wanderers.

== Career statistics ==
Appearances and goals by club, season and competition
Club	Season	League			FA Cup		Total	
Club	Season	Division	Apps	Goals	Apps	Goals	Apps	Goals
West Bromwich Albion	1898–99	First Division	1	0	0	0	1	0
Stoke	1906–07	First Division	7	0	1	0	8	0
Career total			8	0	1	0	9	0
