= John Potts (footballer) =

English footballer

Personal information
- Full name: John Foster Potts
- Date of birth: 22 January 1904
- Place of birth: Ashington, England
- Date of death: 1 October 1986 (aged 82)
- Place of death: Northumberland, England
- Height: 6 ft 1 in (1.85 m)
- Position: Goalkeeper

Youth career
- 1920–1926: Blyth Spartans

Senior career*
Years	Team	Apps	(Gls)
1926–1934	Leeds United	247	(0)
1934–1936	Port Vale	82	(0)
Total		329	(0)
- * Club domestic league appearances and goals

John Foster Potts (22 January 1904 – 1 October 1986) was an English footballer. A goalkeeper, he was tall and described as "safe as houses". He spent 1926 to 1934 with Leeds United, winning promotions out of the Second Division in 1927–28 and 1931–32, and then spent two years with Port Vale. He was the brother-in-law of the Milburn brothers Jack, George and Jimmy, who all played for Leeds United.

== Career ==
Potts joined Blyth Spartans at the age of 16 and played for them whilst working as a coal-hewer at Ashington Colliery. He turned professional at Leeds United after being signed for a fee of £200 in February 1926. He played 12 First Division games at the end of the 1925–26 season. Now club captain, he made 45 appearances in the 1926–27 season, as Leeds were relegated into the Second Division. He kept goal on 39 occasions in 1927–28, as United won promotion in second place. He featured 41 times in 1928–29, but played only 18 games in the 1929–30 campaign. He played 41 games in the 1930–31 season, as Leeds were relegated back into the second tier. He then played 32 matches in the 1931–32 season, as United were again promoted in second place. He made 34 appearances in the 1932–33 campaign, though was absent throughout the 1933–34 season. In his eight years at Elland Road he made 247 league and 15 FA Cup appearances.

In May 1934, he dropped into the Second Division to sign with Port Vale. He kept a clean sheet in his debut match – a 2–0 win over Sheffield United at the Old Recreation Ground on 25 August. He was an ever-present for the 1934–35 season and only missed two matches of the 1935–36 season, for a total of 86 appearances (82 in the Football League and four FA Cup) for the "Valiants". Despite this feat he was released at the end of the 1935–36 season, and was replaced by his understudy Allan Todd.

== Career statistics ==
Appearances and goals by club, season and competition
Club	Season	League			FA Cup		Total	
Club	Season	Division	Apps	Goals	Apps	Goals	Apps	Goals
Leeds United	1925–26	First Division	12	0	0	0	12	0
Leeds United	1926–27	First Division	42	0	3	0	45	0
Leeds United	1927–28	Second Division	38	0	1	0	39	0
Leeds United	1928–29	First Division	39	0	2	0	41	0
Leeds United	1929–30	First Division	16	0	2	0	18	0
Leeds United	1930–31	First Division	38	0	3	0	41	0
Leeds United	1931–32	Second Division	32	0	0	0	32	0
Leeds United	1932–33	First Division	30	0	4	0	30	4
Leeds United	1933–34	First Division	0	0	0	0	0	0
Leeds United	Total		247	0	15	0	262	0
Port Vale	1934–35	Second Division	42	0	1	0	43	0
Port Vale	1935–36	Second Division	40	0	3	0	43	0
Port Vale	Total		82	0	4	0	86	0
Career total			329	0	19	0	348	0

== Honours ==
Leeds United

- Football League Second Division second-place promotion: 1927–28 & 1931–32
