= 1937–38 Carlisle United F.C. season =

Carlisle United F.C.
1937–38 season
- Manager: Fred Westgarth (to March); David Taylor
- Stadium: Brunton Park
- Third Division North: 12th
- FA Cup: First round

For the 1937–38 season, Carlisle United F.C. competed in Football League Third Division North.

== Results & fixtures ==
=== Football League Third Division North ===
==== League table ====
Pos	Team	Pld	W	D	L	GF	GA	GAv	Pts
10	Wrexham	42	16	11	15	58	63	0.921	43
11	York City	42	16	10	16	70	68	1.029	42
12	Carlisle United	42	15	9	18	57	67	0.851	39
13	New Brighton	42	15	8	19	60	61	0.984	38
14	Bradford City	42	14	10	18	66	69	0.957	38

Source: rsssf.com

==== Matches ====
Match Day	Date	Opponent	H/A	Score	Carlisle United Scorer(s)	Attendance
1	28 August	Accrington Stanley	A	4–1		
2	1 September	Chester	H	1–3		
3	4 September	Lincoln City	H	0–1		
4	8 September	Chester	A	0–1		
5	11 September	Halifax Town	H	5–2		
6	13 September	Rotherham United	A	1–0		
7	18 September	Tranmere Rovers	A	0–5		
8	25 September	York City	H	2–1		
9	2 October	Bradford City	A	0–4		
10	9 October	Southport	H	1–0		
11	16 October	Hull City	A	1–2		
12	23 October	New Brighton	H	1–1		
13	30 October	Gateshead	A	1–2		
14	6 November	Oldham Athletic	H	1–1		
15	13 November	Darlington	A	1–3		
16	20 November	Port Vale	H	3–1		
17	4 December	Barrow	H	2–1		
18	18 December	Hartlepools United	H	3–1		
19	25 December	Doncaster Rovers	H	2–2		
20	27 December	Doncaster Rovers	A	3–1		
21	1 January	Accrington Stanley	H	3–1		
22	8 January	Crewe Alexandra	H	5–1		
23	15 January	Lincoln City	A	1–0		
24	22 January	Halifax Town	A	0–0		
25	29 January	Tranmere Rovers	H	0–0		
26	5 February	York City	A	1–3		
27	12 February	Bradford City	H	2–0		
28	19 February	Southport	A	1–1		
29	26 February	Hull City	H	0–1		
30	5 March	New Brighton	A	1–5		
31	12 March	Gateshead	H	1–0		
32	19 March	Oldham Athletic	A	0–3		
33	26 March	Darlington	H	3–0		
34	2 April	Port Vale	A	2–2		
35	9 April	Crewe Alexandra	A	1–4		
36	15 April	Rochdale	A	1–3		
37	16 April	Barrow	A	2–4		
38	18 April	Rochdale	A	1–3		
39	23 April	Wrexham	H	0–0		
40	25 April	Wrexham	A	0–0		
41	30 April	Hartlepools United	A	1–4		
42	7 May	Rotherham United	H	0–1		

=== FA Cup ===
Round	Date	Opponent	H/A	Score	Carlisle United Scorer(s)	Attendance
R1	27 November	Tranmere Rovers	A	1–2		
