= Joe Craven (footballer) =

English footballer (1903–1972)

Personal information
- Full name: Joseph Gerrard Craven
- Date of birth: 28 December 1903
- Place of birth: Preston, England
- Date of death: 1972 (aged 68–69)
- Place of death: Chorley, England
- Height: 5 ft 9 in (1.75 m)
- Position: Centre-half

Youth career
- St. Augustine's

Senior career*
Years	Team	Apps	(Gls)
1924?–1925?	Stockport County	5	(0)
1925?–1931?	Preston North End	37	(1)
1931?–1934?	Swansea Town	49	(0)
1934–1935	Port Vale	11	(0)
1935–1936?	Newport County	28	(0)
1936?–1938?	Accrington Stanley	57	(0)
	Leyland Motors	?	(?)
Total		215	(1)
- * Club domestic league appearances and goals

Joseph Gerrard Craven (28 December 1903 – 1972) was an English footballer who played as a defender in the Football League between 1923 and 1937.

== Career ==
Craven played for St. Augustine's, Stockport County, Preston North End and Swansea Town before joining Second Division side Port Vale in June 1934. After a run of eight games from the start of the 1934–35 season he picked up an injury and played just a further three games at the Old Recreation Ground before moving to Newport County at the end of the season. He later played for Accrington Stanley. After retiring from professional football he became the manager of the "works" football team Leyland Motors.

== Career statistics ==
Appearances and goals by club, season and competition
Club	Season	League			FA Cup		Other		Total	
Club	Season	Division	Apps	Goals	Apps	Goals	Apps	Goals	Apps	Goals
Stockport County	1923–24	Second Division	2	0	0	0	0	0	2	0
Stockport County	1924–25	Second Division	3	0	0	0	0	0	3	0
Stockport County	Total		5	0	0	0	0	0	5	0
Preston North End	1925–26	Second Division	1	1	0	0	0	0	1	1
Preston North End	1926–27	Second Division	2	0	0	0	0	0	2	0
Preston North End	1927–28	Second Division	0	0	0	0	0	0	0	0
Preston North End	1928–29	Second Division	1	0	0	0	0	0	1	0
Preston North End	1929–30	Second Division	33	0	1	0	0	0	34	0
Preston North End	Total		37	1	1	0	0	0	38	1
Swansea Town	1931–32	Second Division	36	0	1	0	0	0	37	0
Swansea Town	1932–33	Second Division	4	0	0	0	0	0	4	0
Swansea Town	1933–34	Second Division	9	0	0	0	0	0	9	0
Swansea Town	Total		49	0	1	0	0	0	50	0
Port Vale	1934–35	Second Division	11	0	0	0	0	0	11	0
Newport County	1935–36	Third Division South	28	0	0	0	1	0	29	0
Accrington Stanley	1936–37	Third Division North	42	0	5	0	2	0	49	0
Accrington Stanley	1937–38	Third Division North	15	0	0	0	1	0	16	0
Accrington Stanley	Total		57	0	5	0	3	0	65	0
Career total			187	1	7	0	4	0	198	1
