= James Baker (footballer, born 1911) =

English footballer

Personal information
- Full name: James Edward Baker
- Date of birth: 3 August 1911
- Place of birth: Wolverhampton, England
- Date of death: 22 February 1974 (aged 62)
- Place of death: Pennington, Cumbria, England
- Height: 5 ft 11 in (1.80 m)
- Positions: Left-back; centre-forward

Youth career
- Darlaston

Senior career*
Years	Team	Apps	(Gls)
1930–1931	Wolverhampton Wanderers	0	(0)
1931–1934	Charlton Athletic	25	(0)
1934–1936	Port Vale	18	(8)
1936–1938	Barrow	52	(3)
Total		95	(11)
- * Club domestic league appearances and goals

James Edward Baker (3 August 1911 – 22 February 1974) was an English footballer.

== Career ==
Baker played for non-League Darlaston before signing for Second Division side Wolverhampton Wanderers in 1930. However, he never made an appearance for their first team and departed for fellow second-flight team Charlton Athletic after just one season at Molineux.

He joined Port Vale from the Londoners in June 1934. Despite being utilized as a left-back on occasion, he managed to rack up a respectable tally of 8 goals in 21 games for the Hanley based club. However, he never won a regular first-team spot and was released in April 1936, at which point he moved on to Barrow.

== Career statistics ==
Appearances and goals by club, season and competition
Club	Season	League			FA Cup		Other		Total	
Club	Season	Division	Apps	Goals	Apps	Goals	Apps	Goals	Apps	Goals
Wolverhampton Wanderers	1930–31	Second Division	0	0	0	0	0	0	0	0
Charlton Athletic	1931–32	Second Division	21	0	1	0	0	0	22	0
Charlton Athletic	1932–33	Second Division	4	0	0	0	0	0	4	0
Charlton Athletic	1933–34	Third Division South	0	0	0	0	1	0	1	0
Charlton Athletic	Total		25	0	1	0	1	0	27	0
Port Vale	1934–35	Second Division	9	4	0	0	0	0	9	4
Port Vale	1935–36	Second Division	9	4	3	0	0	0	12	4
Port Vale	Total		18	8	3	0	0	0	21	8
Barrow	1936–37	Third Division North	33	3	1	0	0	0	34	3
Barrow	1937–38	Third Division North	19	0	0	0	2	1	0	0
Barrow	Total		52	3	1	0	2	1	55	4
Career total			95	11	5	0	3	1	103	12
