= 1936–37 Carlisle United F.C. season =

Carlisle United F.C.
1936–37 season
- Manager: Bob Kelly (to December); Fred Westgarth
- Stadium: Brunton Park
- Third Division North: 10th
- FA Cup: Third round
Home colours

For the 1936–37 season, Carlisle United F.C. competed in Football League Third Division North.

== Results & fixtures ==
=== Football League Third Division North ===
==== League table ====
| Pos | Team | Pld | W | D | L | GF | GA | GAv | Pts | Promotion or relegation |
|---|---|---|---|---|---|---|---|---|---|---|
| 8 | Wrexham | 42 | 16 | 12 | 14 | 71 | 57 | 1.246 | 44 | |
| 9 | Mansfield Town | 42 | 18 | 8 | 16 | 91 | 76 | 1.197 | 44 | Transferred to the Third Division South |
| 10 | Carlisle United | 42 | 18 | 8 | 16 | 65 | 68 | 0.956 | 44 | |
| 11 | Port Vale | 42 | 17 | 10 | 15 | 58 | 64 | 0.906 | 44 | |
| 12 | York City | 42 | 16 | 11 | 15 | 79 | 70 | 1.129 | 43 | |

Source: rsssf.com
Rules for classification: 1) Points; 2) Goal average; 3) Goals scored

==== Matches ====
| Match Day | Date | Opponent | H/A | Score | Carlisle United Scorer(s) | Attendance |
|---|---|---|---|---|---|---|
| 1 | 29 August | Tranmere Rovers | A | 1–5 | | |
| 2 | 3 September | Southport | H | 1–1 | | |
| 3 | 5 September | Halifax Town | H | 1–2 | | |
| 4 | 8 September | Southport | A | 1–2 | | |
| 5 | 12 September | Mansfield Town | A | 4–1 | | |
| 6 | 19 September | Crewe Alexandra | H | 4–0 | | |
| 7 | 26 September | Chester | A | 0–4 | | |
| 8 | 3 October | Rochdale | H | 1–0 | | |
| 9 | 10 October | Barrow | A | 0–5 | | |
| 10 | 17 October | Port Vale | H | 5–2 | | |
| 11 | 24 October | Rotherham United | A | 1–0 | | |
| 12 | 31 October | Stockport County | H | 1–0 | | |
| 13 | 7 November | Wrexham | A | 0–1 | | |
| 14 | 14 November | Darlington | H | 2–0 | | |
| 15 | 21 November | Gateshead | A | 0–1 | | |
| 16 | 5 December | New Brighton | A | 1–1 | | |
| 17 | 19 December | Accrington Stanley | A | 1–2 | | |
| 18 | 25 December | Oldham Athletic | H | 2–1 | | |
| 19 | 26 December | Tranmere Rovers | H | 3–1 | | |
| 20 | 28 December | Oldham Athletic | A | 1–2 | | |
| 21 | 1 January | York City | H | 1–1 | | |
| 22 | 2 January | Halifax Town | A | 1–6 | | |
| 23 | 9 January | Mansfield Town | H | 1–2 | | |
| 24 | 21 January | Hull City | H | 1–1 | | |
| 25 | 23 January | Crewe Alexandra | A | 2–1 | | |
| 26 | 4 February | Chester | H | 1–1 | | |
| 27 | 6 February | Rochdale | A | 0–3 | | |
| 28 | 13 February | Barrow | H | 2–2 | | |
| 29 | 20 February | Port Vale | A | 0–1 | | |
| 30 | 27 February | Rotherham United | H | 4–1 | | |
| 31 | 6 March | Stockport County | A | 1–0 | | |
| 32 | 13 March | Wrexham | H | 2–1 | | |
| 33 | 20 March | Darlington | A | 5–1 | | |
| 34 | 26 March | Hartlepools United | H | 2–0 | | |
| 35 | 27 March | Gateshead | H | 2–1 | | |
| 36 | 29 March | Hartlepools United | A | 0–3 | | |
| 37 | 3 April | Hull City | A | 1–1 | | |
| 38 | 10 April | New Brighton | H | 1–1 | | |
| 39 | 15 April | Lincoln City | H | 3–1 | | |
| 40 | 17 April | Lincoln City | A | 0–3 | | |
| 41 | 24 April | Accrington Stanley | H | 2–0 | | |
| 42 | 1 May | York City | A | 2–5 | | |

=== FA Cup ===
| Round | Date | Opponent | H/A | Score | Carlisle United Scorer(s) | Attendance |
|---|---|---|---|---|---|---|
| R1 | 28 November | Stockport County | H | 2–1 | | |
| R2 | 12 December | Clapton Orient | H | 4–1 | | |
| R3 | 16 January | Swansea Town | A | 0–1 | | |
