= James Groves (footballer) =

English footballer

Personal information
- Full name: James Albert Groves
- Date of birth: July 1883
- Place of birth: South Bank, North Yorkshire, England
- Date of death: 1921 (aged 69)
- Position: Full back

Senior career*
Years	Team	Apps	(Gls)
1903–1904	Lincoln City	29	(2)
1904–1907	Sheffield United	62	(0)
1907–1910	Middlesbrough	27	(2)
- * Club domestic league appearances and goals

James Albert Groves (July 1883 – 1939) was an English footballer who played in the Football League for Lincoln City, Middlesbrough and Sheffield United.
