= 1935–36 Carlisle United F.C. season =

Carlisle United F.C.
1935–36 season
- Manager: Bob Kelly
- Stadium: Brunton Park
- Third Division North: 13th
- FA Cup: First round

For the 1935–36 season, Carlisle United F.C. competed in Football League Third Division North.

== Results & fixtures ==
=== Football League Third Division North ===
==== League table ====
Pos	Team	Pld	W	D	L	GF	GA	GAv	Pts
11	Rotherham United	42	16	9	17	69	66	1.045	41
12	Darlington	42	17	6	19	74	79	0.937	40
13	Carlisle United	42	14	12	16	56	62	0.903	40
14	Gateshead	42	13	14	15	56	76	0.737	40
15	Barrow	42	13	12	17	58	65	0.892	38

Source: rsssf.com

==== Matches ====
Match Day	Date	Opponent	H/A	Score	Carlisle United Scorer(s)	Attendance
1	31 August	Darlington	H	3–0		
2	2 September	Halifax Town	A	0–1		
3	7 September	Gateshead	A	1–1		
4	11 September	Halifax Town	H	0–0		
5	14 September	Tranmere Rovers	H	0–1		
6	19 September	Oldham Athletic	H	2–1		
7	21 September	Walsall	A	0–3		
8	28 September	Stockport County	H	2–1		
9	5 October	Hartlepools United	H	0–0		
10	12 October	Mansfield Town	A	1–1		
11	19 October	Crewe Alexandra	A	0–2		
12	26 October	Accrington Stanley	H	3–1		
13	2 November	Southport	A	3–0		
14	9 November	Chester	H	1–3		
15	16 November	Lincoln City	A	0–2		
16	23 November	Rochdale	H	4–3		
17	14 December	New Brighton	A	0–3		
18	21 December	Chesterfield	H	2–1		
19	26 December	Rotherham United	A	0–4		
20	28 December	Darlington	A	1–4		
21	1 January	Rotherham United	H	1–1		
22	4 January	Gateshead	H	2–0		
23	11 January	York City	A	0–2		
24	18 January	Tranmere Rovers	A	1–4		
25	25 January	Walsall	H	2–1		
26	1 February	Stockport County	A	0–2		
27	8 February	Hartlepools United	A	1–1		
28	15 February	Mansfield Town	H	3–0		
29	22 February	Crewe Alxandra	H	1–2		
30	29 February	Chester	A	2–3		
31	7 March	Southport	H	4–0		
32	14 March	Accrington Stanley	A	0–0		
33	21 March	Lincoln City	H	4–1		
34	28 March	Rochdale	A	0–0		
35	4 April	York City	H	0–0		
36	10 April	Wrexham	H	5–1		
37	11 April	Barrow	A	1–1		
38	13 April	Wrexham	A	1–1		
39	18 April	New Brighton	H	3–0		
40	25 April	Chesterfield	A	0–5		
41	30 April	Barrow	H	2–2		
42	2 May	Oldham Athletic	A	0–3		

=== FA Cup ===
Round	Date	Opponent	H/A	Score	Carlisle United Scorer(s)	Attendance
R1	30 November	Tranmere Rovers	A	0–3		
