= Bob Morton (footballer, born 1906) =

English footballer

Personal information
- Full name: Robert Morton
- Date of birth: 3 March 1906
- Place of birth: Widdrington, England
- Date of death: April 1990 (age 84)
- Place of death: Widdrington, England
- Height: 5 ft 8 in (1.73 m)
- Position: Left winger

Youth career
- Tritlington

Senior career*
Years	Team	Apps	(Gls)
1922–1925	Ashington	3	(0)
1925–1927	Bedlington United		
1927–1928	Barnsley	1	(1)
1928–1929	Nottingham Forest	34	(3)
1929–1931	Newark Town		
1931–1932	Bradford Park Avenue	6	(0)
1932–1935	Port Vale	101	(19)
- Throckley Welfare
Total		145+	(23+)
- * Club domestic league appearances and goals

Robert Morton (3 March 1906 – April 1990) was an English footballer who played for Ashington, Barnsley, Nottingham Forest, Newark Town, Bradford Park Avenue, and Port Vale in the 1920s and 1930s.

== Career ==
Morton played for Tritlington, Ashington, Bedlington United, Barnsley, Nottingham Forest, Newark Town and Bradford Park Avenue, before joining Port Vale in May 1932. He scored ten goals in 33 Second Division appearances in the 1932–33 season and found the net against West Ham United and Manchester United at the Old Recreation Ground. He scored five goals in 33 games in the 1933–34 campaign, with two of these goals coming in a 2–0 win over Preston North End on 10 March. He scored five goals in 36 league and FA Cup games in the 1934–35 season, before leaving the Football League to play for Throckley Welfare.

== Career statistics ==
Appearances and goals by club, season and competition
Club	Season	League			FA Cup		Total	
Club	Season	Division	Apps	Goals	Apps	Goals	Apps	Goals
Ashington	1922–23	Third Division North	1	0	0	0	1	0
Ashington	1923–24	Third Division North	0	0	0	0	0	0
Ashington	1924–25	Third Division North	2	0	0	0	2	0
Ashington	Total		3	0	0	0	3	0
Barnsley	1927–28	Second Division	1	1	0	0	1	1
Nottingham Forest	1928–29	Second Division	27	3	1	0	28	3
Nottingham Forest	1929–30	Second Division	7	0	1	0	8	0
Nottingham Forest	Total		34	3	2	0	36	3
Bradford Park Avenue	1931–32	Second Division	6	0	0	0	6	0
Port Vale	1932–33	Second Division	33	10	0	0	33	10
Port Vale	1933–34	Second Division	33	5	0	0	33	5
Port Vale	1934–35	Second Division	35	4	1	1	36	5
Port Vale	Total		101	19	1	1	102	20
Career total			145	23	3	1	148	24
