= James Jones =

James Jones may refer to:

== Sports ==
=== Association football ===
- James Jones (footballer, born 1873) (1873–1955), British Olympic footballer
- Jimmy Jones (footballer, born 1876) (1876–?), English football player for Stoke
- Jimmy Jones (footballer, born 1889) (1889–?), English football player for Blackpool and Bolton Wanderers
- Jimmy Jones (footballer, born 1895) (1895–1966), Welsh international footballer
- Jimmy Jones (footballer, born 1919) (1919–1976), Welsh footballer
- Jimmy Jones (footballer, born 1928) (1928–2014), Northern Ireland international football player with Belfast Celtic and Glenavon
- Jimmy Jones (footballer, born 1927) (1927–2015), English football goalkeeper for Accrington Stanley
- James Jones (footballer, born 1996), Scottish footballer for Crewe Alexandra
- James Jones (footballer, born 1997), Welsh footballer for Chester

=== American football ===
- Jim Jones (American football, born 1920) (1920–1989), American football player
- James "T" Jones (1931–2020), college football player, coach and athletic director
- Jim Jones (American football, born 1935) (1935–1982), American football player
- Jimmy Jones (wide receiver) (born 1941), former professional American football wide receiver
- James Jones (running back, born 1958), running back for the Dallas Cowboys
- James Jones (running back, born 1961), running back for Detroit Lions and Seattle Seahawks
- James Jones (defensive lineman) (born 1969), defensive lineman for Cleveland Browns, Denver Broncos, Baltimore Ravens, Detroit Lions
- James Jones (wide receiver) (born 1984)

=== Baseball ===
- Jim Jones (1900s outfielder) (1876–1953), Major League Baseball outfielder
- Jim Jones (1940s outfielder), American baseball outfielder in the 1940s
- Jimmy Jones (baseball) (born 1964), Major League Baseball player
- James Jones (baseball) (born 1988), American baseball player

=== Basketball ===
- James Jones (basketball, born 1964), American basketball coach
- Jimmy Jones (basketball) (born 1945), American former basketball player in the ABA and NBA
- James Jones (basketball, born 1980), American basketball executive and former player in the NBA

=== Cricket ===
- James Jones (cricketer, born 1885) (1885–1953), cricketer for Somerset and Glamorgan in the 1920s
- James Jones (cricketer, born 1870) (1870–1960), English cricketer
- Jim Jones (cricketer) (1931–1998), New Zealand cricketer

=== Rugby ===
- James Phillips Jones (1883–1964), Welsh international rugby union utility player
- James Jones (rugby league) (fl. 1930), New Zealand rugby league player
- Jimmy Jones (rugby league), rugby league footballer of the 1940s and 1950s
- Jim Jones (rugby union) (1893—1934), Welsh rugby union player

=== Other sports ===
- James Jones (sport shooter) (1871–1955), Canadian Olympic shooter
- Jim Jones (footballer) (1918–2002), Australian rules footballer for Carlton
- Jim Jones (ice hockey) (born 1949), Canadian National Hockey League player
- Jimmy Jones (ice hockey) (born 1953), National Hockey League player

== Political figures ==
=== United States ===
- James Jones (Georgia politician) (died 1801), congressman, namesake of Jones County, Georgia
- James Jones (South Dakota politician) (1927–2014), South Dakota politician
- James Jones (Virginia politician) (1772–1848), U.S. representative from Virginia
- James A. Jones (1820–1894), Virginia State Senate, Constitutional Convention of 1850
- James B. Jones (1886–1947), lieutenant governor of New Mexico
- James C. Jones (1809–1859), governor of Tennessee
- James F. Jones Jr. (1934–2021), Pennsylvania politician
- James G. Jones (general) (1934–2020), United States Air Force general
- James G. Jones (politician) (1814–1872), American politician, lawyer, soldier, and judge in Indiana
- James H. Jones (Texas politician) (1830–1904), U.S. Representative from Texas
- James H. Jones (North Carolina politician) (died 1921), coachman and confidential courier for Jefferson Davis and later a local public official in North Carolina
- James Herbert Jones (1920–2008), Arkansas State Auditor, Adjutant General of the Arkansas National Guard
- James I. Jones (1786–1858), major general from New York
- James K. Jones (1839–1908), chairman of the Democratic National Committee
- James L. Jones (born 1943), former National Security Advisor and 32nd Commandant of the United States Marine Corps
- James L. Jones Sr. (1912–1986), officer in the United States Marine Corps
- James McHall Jones (1823–1851), U.S. federal judge
- James M. Jones (1862–1928), mayor of Kansas City, Missouri
- James M. Jones, Jr., mayor of Birmingham, Alabama
- James Parker Jones (born 1940), U.S. federal judge
- James R. Jones (born 1939), congressman from Oklahoma and U.S. Ambassador to Mexico
- James R. Jones (Virginia politician) American politician in the Virginia House of Delegates and Virginia Senate
- James S. Jones, American politician in the Virginia House of Delegates
- James T. Jones (1832–1895), U.S. representative from Alabama
- J. Weldon Jones (1896–1981), American administrator and acting High Commissioner to the Philippines
- James Wormley Jones (1884–1958), African-American policeman, World War I veteran, and FBI agent
- Jim Jones (judge) (James Thomas Jones, born 1942), American attorney, politician, and jurist

=== Other countries ===
- Idwal Jones (politician) (James Idwal Jones, 1900–1982), Welsh politician
- Jim Jones (Canadian politician) (born 1943), Canadian politician
- James William Jones (1869–1954), merchant, realtor and political figure in British Columbia, Canada

== Religious figures ==
- James F. Jones (minister) (1907–1971), African American religious leader and founder of the Church of Universal Triumph, Dominion of God, Inc.
- Jim Jones (James Warren Jones, 1931–1978), cult leader of the Peoples Temple responsible for the collective suicide at Jonestown, Guyana
- James Jones (bishop) (born 1948), former Anglican bishop of Liverpool
- James Jones (priest, born 1881) (1881–1980), Church of England priest
- James Jones (priest, born 1730) (1730–1823), archdeacon of Hereford
- Kilsby Jones (James Rhys Jones, 1813–1889), Welsh minister, writer and lecturer

== Arts and entertainment ==
- Jimmy Jones (pianist) (1918–1982), American jazz pianist
- James Jones (author) (1921–1977), American novelist
- James Earl Jones (1931–2024), American actor
- James Cellan Jones (1931–2019), British television and film director
- T. James Jones (born 1934), Welsh poet and dramatist
- Jimmy Jones (singer) (1937–2012), American singer, born James Jones
- Tail Dragger Jones (1940–2023), American Chicago blues singer
- Jim Jones (guitarist) (1950–2008), American guitarist with the band Pere Ubu
- James T. Jones IV (1959/1960–1996), American music journalist
- Boldy James (born 1982), American rapper, born James Clay Jones III
- James Jones (documentary maker) (born 1982), British documentary film-maker
- Notorious Cree, real name James Jones, Cree hoop dancer and social media influencer

== Other people ==
- James W. Jones (1809–1892), civil engineer in Adelaide, South Australia
- James McHenry Jones (1859–1909), American educator, school administrator, businessperson, and minister
- James Addison Jones (1869–1950), founder of J.A. Jones Construction
- James Ira Thomas Jones (1896–1960), British flying ace during the First World War
- James Jones (civil servant) (1914–1995), Scottish civil servant
- James Jones (psychologist), American social psychologist
- James F. Jones (educator) (born 1947), president of Trinity College, Hartford, Connecticut
- James Matthew Jones (born 1961), American global public health expert and consultant
- James Monroe Jones (1821/22–1906), American-born slave, purchased his freedom and became a gunsmith and engraver in Canada

== Characters ==
- Jimbo Jones, one of the main bullies in The Simpsons

== See also ==
- Pimp C (1973–2007), American rapper also known as Sweet James Jones
- Jim Jones (disambiguation)
- Jimmy Jones (disambiguation)
- Jamie Jones (disambiguation)
