= Jim Jones (disambiguation) =

Jim Jones (1931–1978) was the cult leader of the Peoples Temple responsible for the collective suicide at Jonestown, Guyana.

Jim Jones may also refer to:

== Sports ==
- Jim Jones (1900s outfielder) (1876–1953), Major League Baseball outfielder
- Jim Jones (1940s outfielder), American baseball outfielder in the 1940s
- Jim Jones (footballer) (1918–2002), Australian rules footballer for Carlton
- Jim Jones (ice hockey) (born 1949), Canadian National Hockey League player
- Jim Jones (American football, born 1920) (1920–1989), American football player
- Jim Jones (American football, born 1935) (1935–1982), American football player
- Jim Jones (athletic director) (1936–2020), American college athletics administrator
- Jim Jones (offensive guard) (born 1978), American football player
- Jim Jones (cricketer) (1931–1998), New Zealand cricketer
- Jim Jones (rugby union), Welsh international rugby union player

== Music ==
- Jim Jones (rapper) (born 1976), American rapper from Harlem
- Jim Jones (guitarist) (1950–2008), American guitarist with the band Pere Ubu
- Jim Jones, British singer and frontman of the Jim Jones Revue

== Politics and government ==
- Jim Jones (Idaho politician) (1922–2012), American politician from Idaho
- Jim Jones (judge) (born 1942), chief justice of the Idaho Supreme Court and former Attorney General of Idaho
- Jim Jones (Canadian politician) (born 1943), Canadian politician

== Other ==
- Stephen Huntley Watt (born 1984), an American computer scientist and former hacker whose aliases included "JimJones"

== See also ==
- "Jim Jones at Botany Bay", traditional Australian folk ballad
- James Jones (disambiguation)
- Jimmy Jones (disambiguation)
- Jimmie Jones (disambiguation)
