= Jimmy Jones =

Jimmy Jones may refer to:

== Sports ==
=== Association football ===
- Jimmy Jones (footballer, born 1876) (1876–?), English football player for Stoke
- Jimmy Jones (footballer, born 1889) (1889–?), English football player for Blackpool and Bolton Wanderers
- Jimmy Jones (footballer, born 1901) (1901–1976), Welsh international footballer
- Jimmy Jones (footballer, born 1919) (1919–1976), Welsh footballer
- Jimmy Jones (footballer, born 1928) (1928–2014), Northern Ireland international football player with Belfast Celtic and Glenavon
- Jimmy Jones (footballer, born 1927) (1927–2015), English football goalkeeper for Accrington Stanley

=== Gridiron football ===
- Jimmy Jones (wide receiver) (born 1941), former professional American football wide receiver
- Jimmy Jones (quarterback) (born 1950), Canadian Football League player

=== Other sports ===
- Jimmy Jones (Australian footballer) (1889–1955), Australian football player for Essendon
- Jimmy Jones (baseball) (born 1964), Major League Baseball player
- Jimmy Jones (basketball) (born 1945), former National Basketball Association player
- Jimmy Jones (ice hockey) (born 1953), National Hockey League player
- Jimmy Jones (rugby league), rugby league footballer of the 1940s and 1950s
- Jimmy Jones (tennis) (1912–1986), British tennis player and author
- Horace A. Jones (1906–2001), known as Jimmy, U.S. Hall of Fame racehorse trainer
- Melvin Nelson (1936 or 1937–2017), American professional wrestler who competed as Jimmy Jones and Burrhead Jones

== Other people ==
- Jimmy Jones (comedian) (born 1938), British comedian
- Jimmy Jones (singer) (1937–2012), American singer/songwriter
- Jimmy Jones (pianist) (1918–1982), American jazz pianist
- Jim Jones (rapper) (born 1976), American hip hop recording artist
- James F. Jones (educator) (born 1947), former president of Trinity College in Hartford, CT; known to students as Jimmy Jones

== See also ==
- Jimmie Jones (disambiguation)
- Jim Jones (disambiguation)
- James Jones (disambiguation)
