= 1924–25 Aston Villa F.C. season =

English football club season

Aston Villa
1924–25 season
- President: Patrick Hannon
- Chairman: Frederick Rinder
- Manager: George Ramsay
- Stadium: Villa Park
- First Division: 15th
- FA Cup: Third round

First Division
- Season: 1924–25
- Champions: Huddersfield Town, 2nd title
- Relegated: Preston North End; Nottingham Forest
- Top goalscorer: Frank Roberts (31 goals)
- Biggest home win: Leeds United 6–0 Aston Villa (25 December 1924); Blackburn 7–1 Birmingham (2 April 1925); Bolton 6–0 Blackburn (22 April 1925)
- Biggest away win: Sheffield United 0–5 Man City (27 September 1924); Arsenal 0–5 Huddersfield Town (14 February 1925)
- Highest scoring: Burnley 5–4 West Ham United (28 February 1925)

Second City Derby
- 13--8--6

The 1924–25 English football season was Aston Villa's 33rd season in The Football League.

In the Second City Derby, both teams won their home fixtures. Len Capewell scored in the 1–0 victory over Birmingham at Villa Park.

Captain Frank Moss had sacrificed his wages over the summer break in a dispute with the club. Dicky York scored seven goals in 34 matches in 1924–25.

There were debuts for Wally Harris (20), Joe Eccles, Tommy Muldoon, Arthur Phoenix, George Jakeman, George Clarke, Tom Jones, Billy Dinsdale and Les Dennington (1).

Villa agreed to play the touring South Africa amateurs in October 1924.

== Table ==
Pos	Team	Pld	W	D	L	GF	GA	GAv	Pts
13	West Ham United	42	15	12	15	62	60	1.033	42
14	Sheffield United	42	13	13	16	55	63	0.873	39
15	Aston Villa	42	13	13	16	58	71	0.817	39
16	Blackburn Rovers	42	11	13	18	53	66	0.803	35
17	Everton	42	12	11	19	40	60	0.667	35

Source: World Football
Rules for classification: 1) Points; 2) Goal average; 3) Goals scored

=== Matches ===
30 August 1924	Liverpool	2–4	Aston Villa	Anfield
		Report	Billy Walker (2); (Arthur Dorrell); (Billy Kirton)

1 September 1924	Aston Villa	3–3	Bury	Villa Park
	(Dicky York); (Billy Kirton); (Len Capewell)	Report

6 September 1924	Aston Villa	0–0	Newcastle United	Villa Park
		Report

8 September 1924	Bury	4–3	Aston Villa	Gigg Lane
		Report	; (Arthur Dorrell); (Billy Walker)

13 September 1924	Sheffield United	2–2	Aston Villa	Bramall Lane
		Report	(Len Capewell); (Billy Walker)

20 September 1924	Aston Villa	1–1	West Ham United	Villa Park
	(Billy Walker)	Report

27 September 1924	Blackburn Rovers	1–1	Aston Villa	Ewood Park
		Report	(Billy Walker)

2 October 1924	Nottingham Forest	0–2	Aston Villa	City Ground
		Report	(Billy Kirton); (Billy Walker)

4 October 1924	Aston Villa	1–1	Huddersfield Town	Villa Park
	(Billy Walker)	Report

11 October 1924	Birmingham City	1–0	Aston Villa	St Andrew’s
		Report

18 October 1924	Arsenal	1–1	Aston Villa	Highbury
		Report	(Billy Walker)

25 October 1924	Aston Villa	1–0	West Bromwich Albion	Villa Park
	(Arthur Dorrell)	Report

1 November 1924	Aston Villa	3–1	Tottenham Hotspur	Villa Park
	(George Stephenson); (Len Capewell); (Frank Moss)	Report

8 November 1924	Aston Villa	2–2	Bolton Wanderers	Villa Park
	(Billy Kirton); (Billy Walker)	Report

15 November 1924	Notts County	0–0	Aston Villa	Meadow Lane
		Report

22 November 1924	Aston Villa	3–1	Everton	Villa Park
	(Billy Walker); (Arthur Dorrell); (Percy Varco)	Report

29 November 1924	Sunderland	1–1	Aston Villa	Roker Park
		Report	(George Blackburn)

6 December 1924	Aston Villa	1–2	Cardiff City	Villa Park
	(Billy Walker)	Report

13 December 1924	Preston North End	3–2	Aston Villa	Deepdale
		Report	(Arthur Dorrell); (Billy Walker)

20 December 1924	Aston Villa	3–0	Burnley	Villa Park
	(Billy Kirton); (Albert Surtees); (Billy Walker)	Report

25 December 1924	Leeds United	6–0	Aston Villa	Elland Road
		Report

26 December 1924	Aston Villa	2–1	Leeds United	Villa Park
	(Arthur Phoenix); (Arthur Phoenix)	Report

3 January 1925	Newcastle United	4–1	Aston Villa	St James’ Park
		Report	(Billy Kirton)

17 January 1925	Aston Villa	1–1	Sheffield United	Villa Park
	(Dicky York)	Report

21 January 1925	Aston Villa	1–4	Liverpool	Villa Park
	(Len Capewell)	Report

24 January 1925	West Ham United	2–0	Aston Villa	Upton Park
		Report

7 February 1925	Huddersfield Town	4–1	Aston Villa	Leeds Road
		Report	(Billy Walker)

14 February 1925	Aston Villa	1–0	Birmingham City	Villa Park
	(Len Capewell)	Report

28 February 1925	West Bromwich Albion	4–1	Aston Villa	The Hawthorns
		Report	(Dicky York)

7 March 1925	Aston Villa	0–1	Tottenham Hotspur	Villa Park
		Report

14 March 1925	Bolton Wanderers	4–0	Aston Villa	Burnden Park
		Report

21 March 1925	Aston Villa	0–0	Notts County	Villa Park
		Report

28 March 1925	Everton	2–0	Aston Villa	Goodison Park
		Report

1 April 1925	Aston Villa	4–0	Arsenal	Villa Park
	(Dicky York); (Dicky York); (Billy Walker); (Arthur Dorrell)	Report

4 April 1925	Aston Villa	1–4	Sunderland	Villa Park
	(Arthur Dorrell)	Report

10 April 1925	Aston Villa	2–1	Manchester City	Villa Park
	(George Stephenson); (Billy Walker)	Report

11 April 1925	Cardiff City	2–1	Aston Villa	Ninian Park
		Report	(Dicky York)

13 April 1925	Manchester City	1–0	Aston Villa	Maine Road
		Report

18 April 1925	Aston Villa	1–0	Preston North End	Villa Park
	(Percy Varco)	Report

25 April 1925	Burnley	1–1	Aston Villa	Turf Moor
		Report	(Billy Walker)

29 April 1925	Aston Villa	4–3	Blackburn Rovers	Villa Park
	(George Stephenson); (George Stephenson); (Arthur Dorrell); (Billy Walker)	Report

2 May 1925	Aston Villa	2–0	Nottingham Forest	Villa Park
	(George Stephenson); (George Stephenson)	Report
Note:

Source: avfchistory.co.uk

== FA Cup ==
=== First round ===
42 of 44 clubs from the Football League First and Second Divisions joined the 12 Second and Third Division clubs who came through the qualifying rounds. Indeed, had the FA not exempted amateur side Corinthian until the first round proper, this stage would have been an all-League affair for the only time in the competition's history. This would also be the last time that First Division teams started at this stage, with significant format changes set to be introduced to the tournament in 1925.

To bring the number of teams up to 64, nine Third Division South sides, Watford, *Brighton, Luton, *Swindon, *Northampton, Bristol City, Millwall, Swansea and Plymouth were given byes to this round. 32 matches were scheduled to be played on Saturday, 10 January 1925

Tie no	Home team	Score	Away team	Date
11	Aston Villa	7–2	Port Vale	10 January 1925

=== Second round ===
The 16 Second Round matches were played on Saturday, 31 January 1925. Five matches were drawn, with replays taking place in the following midweek fixture. One of these then went to a second replay played the following week.

Tie no	Home team	Score	Away team	Date
16	Swansea Town	1–3	Aston Villa	31 January 1925

=== Third round ===
The eight Third Round matches were scheduled for Saturday, 21 February 1925. Four matches were drawn and went to replays in the following midweek fixture.

Tie no	Home team	Score	Away team	Date
4	West Bromwich Albion	1–1	Aston Villa	21 February 1925
Replay	Aston Villa	1–2	West Bromwich Albion	25 February 1925

== See also ==
- List of Aston Villa F.C. records and statistics
