= Jakeman =

Jakeman is a surname. Notable people with the surname include:

- Eric Jakeman (born 1939), British mathematical physicist
- Freddie Jakeman (1920–1986), English cricketer
- George Jakeman (1903–1973), English footballer
- M. Wells Jakeman (1910–1998), American archaeologist
- Stuart Jakeman (1943–2013), English cricketer

== See also ==
- Lakeman
