= Harry Mellor =

Harry Mellor may refer to:

- Harry Mellor (footballer, born 1878) (1878–1950), footballer with Crewe Alexandra, Stoke and Grimsby Town
- Harry Mellor (footballer, born 1895), played in the Football League for Nelson
