= Arthur Bentley =

Arthur Bentley may refer to:

- Arthur F. Bentley (1870–1957), American political scientist and philosopher
- Arthur Bentley (footballer) (1871–after 1897), English footballer
- A. Lee Bentley III (Arthur Lee Bentley III, born 1959), American lawyer
