= 1899–1900 Stoke F.C. season =

Stoke
1899–1900 season
- Chairman: Mr W Cowlishaw
- Manager: Horace Austerberry
- Stadium: Victoria Ground
- Football League First Division: 9th (34 Points)
- FA Cup: First Round
- Top goalscorer: League: William Maxwell (11); All: William Maxwell (11)
- Highest home attendance: 15,000 vs Aston Villa (13 November 1899)
- Lowest home attendance: 3,000 vs Blackburn Rovers (4 November 1899)
- Average home league attendance: 7,250
Home colours

The 1899–1900 season was Stoke's 11th season in the Football League.

As the nineteenth century gave way to the twentieth, it became common knowledge that Stoke were still under a heavy financial cloud. There had been more public appeals for funds - and a certain amount of money had been raised. The directors had continued to go to Scotland for players but, they were not all that successful. The team itself had flirted with relegation for a number of seasons now and there had been only one respectable cup run, Stoke often looked capable of beating the best teams in the country but they were far too inconsistent and always seemed to be at least a couple of quality players short of what was required to challenge for honours.

Stoke's final season of the nineteenth century saw them finish in a mid table position of 9th, Stoke struggled for goals during the season scoring 37 only the bottom two relegated clubs scoring less.

== Season review ==
=== League ===
Stoke began the 1899–1900 campaign well, beating Liverpool and Preston North End at home and drawing away at Burnley in their first three matches. Tom Wilkes had replaced the outgoing George Clawley in goal and there was a change in attack as local player Sam Higginson was introduced in the place of Fred Molyneux who joined Bristol City while Jack Farrell joined Southampton. Tom Holford also came through the ranks at the Victoria Ground and he went on to become a club legend making over 260 appearances. There was also change in the boardroom as Mr W Cowlishaw replaced Mr J Fenton.

On 13 November 1899 league leaders Aston Villa visited Stoke which attracted a crowd of 15,000 to the Victoria Ground. Gate receipts amounted to £379 a record at the time. Villa won 2–0 and were on their way to a third straight title. Stoke took ninth place in the First Division just two points away from fifth.

=== FA Cup ===
After last seasons run to the semi-final Stoke exited the FA Cup this season in the first round losing 1–0 in a replay to Liverpool after a 0–0 draw.

== Final league table ==
Pos	Team	Pld	W	D	L	GF	GA	GAv	Pts
7	Manchester City	34	13	8	13	50	44	1.136	34
8	Nottingham Forest	34	13	8	13	56	55	1.018	34
9	Stoke	34	13	8	13	37	45	0.822	34
10	Liverpool	34	14	5	15	49	45	1.089	33
11	Everton	34	13	7	14	47	49	0.959	33

Source: World Football
Rules for classification: 1) Points; 2) Goal average; 3) Goals scored

== Results ==
Stoke's score comes first

=== Legend ===
Win	Draw	Loss

=== Football League First Division ===
Match	Date	Opponent	Venue	Result	Attendance	Scorers
1	2 September 1899	Liverpool	H	3–2	8,000	Maxwell (2), Kennedy
2	9 September 1899	Burnley	A	2–2	5,000	Higginson, Parsons
3	16 September 1899	Preston North End	H	3–1	6,000	Maxwell (2), Kennedy
4	18 September 1899	Wolverhampton Wanderers	H	1–3	6,500	Turner
5	23 September 1899	Nottingham Forest	A	0–1	5,000	
6	30 September 1899	Glossop	H	1–0	3,000	Maxwell
7	7 October 1899	Wolverhampton Wanderers	A	2–0	3,000	Maxwell, Higginson
8	14 October 1899	Sunderland	A	0–3	7,000	
9	21 October 1899	West Bromwich Albion	H	1–0	13,500	Maxwell
10	28 October 1899	Everton	H	1–1	12,000	Maxwell
11	4 November 1899	Blackburn Rovers	H	2–0	3,000	Maxwell, Holford
12	11 November 1899	Derby County	A	0–2	5,000	
13	13 November 1899	Aston Villa	H	0–2	15,000	
14	25 November 1899	Notts County	A	3–1	9,000	Turner (2), Robertson (pen)
15	2 December 1899	Manchester City	H	1–0	12,000	Johnson
16	9 December 1899	Sheffield United	A	0–1	10,000	
17	16 December 1899	Newcastle United	H	2–2	4,000	Turner, Higginson
18	23 December 1899	Aston Villa	A	1–4	18,000	Robertson
19	25 December 1899	Everton	A	0–2	15,000	
20	26 December 1899	Burnley	H	3–0	4,500	Maxwell (2), Tooth
21	30 December 1899	Liverpool	A	0–0	5,000	
22	13 January 1900	Preston North End	A	0–3	4,000	
23	20 January 1900	Nottingham Forest	H	0–0	4,000	
24	3 February 1900	Glossop	A	2–1	2,000	Turner (2)
25	10 March 1900	Blackburn Rovers	A	0–3	6,000	
26	17 March 1900	Derby County	H	1–1	5,000	Turner
27	19 March 1900	West Bromwich Albion	A	0–4	1,717	
28	26 March 1900	Sunderland	H	1–2	6,000	Kennedy
29	31 March 1900	Notts County	H	1–0	6,000	Turner
30	7 April 1900	Manchester City	A	0–1	15,000	
31	13 April 1900	Bury	A	1–0	6,500	Wood
32	14 April 1900	Sheffield United	H	1–1	6,000	Jones
33	16 April 1900	Bury	H	2–0	4,000	Jones (2)
34	21 April 1900	Newcastle United	A	2–2	12,000	Jones (2)

=== FA Cup ===
Round	Date	Opponent	Venue	Result	Attendance	Scorers
R1	27 January 1900	Liverpool	H	0–0	8,500	
R1 Replay	1 February 1900	Liverpool	A	0–1	7,000	

== Squad statistics ==
Pos.	Name	League		FA Cup		Total	
Pos.	Name	Apps	Goals	Apps	Goals	Apps	Goals
GK	(England) Arthur Cartlidge	3	0	0	0	3	0
GK	(England) Tom Wilkes	31	0	2	0	33	0
FB	(England) Bill Capewell	11	0	1	0	12	0
FB	(England) Jack Eccles	26	0	2	0	28	0
FB	(Scotland) Tom Robertson	34	2	2	0	36	2
HB	(England) John Bowman	2	0	0	0	2	0
HB	(England) James Bradley	33	0	2	0	35	0
HB	(England) Tom Holford	7	1	0	0	7	1
HB	(England) Edward Parsons	31	1	2	0	33	1
HB	(England) Alf Wood	27	1	2	0	29	1
FW	(England) Ephraim Colclough	1	0	0	0	1	0
FW	(England) Sam Higginson	31	3	2	0	33	3
FW	(England) Freddie Johnson	29	1	1	0	30	1
FW	(England) Jimmy Jones	14	5	2	0	16	5
FW	(Scotland) Jack Kennedy	29	3	2	0	31	3
FW	(Scotland) William Maxwell	22	11	0	0	22	11
FW	(England) Harry Mellor	3	0	0	0	3	0
FW	(England) Arthur Roberts	2	0	0	0	2	0
FW	(England) George Tooth	4	1	0	0	4	1
FW	(England) Joe Turner	30	8	2	0	32	8
FW	(England) Harvey Whittaker	4	0	0	0	4	0
