= Fred Molyneux =

Fred Molyneux may refer to:

- Fred Molyneux (footballer, born 1873)
- Fred Molyneux (footballer, born 1944)
