= Fred Sheldon (English footballer) =

English footballer

Personal information
- Full name: Fredrick Sheldon
- Date of birth: 1871
- Place of birth: Stoke-upon-Trent, England
- Position: Goalkeeper

Senior career*
Years	Team	Apps	(Gls)
1895	Stoke St.Peter's		
1896–1898	Stoke	8	(0)
1899	Eccleshall		
- * Club domestic league appearances and goals

Fredrick Sheldon (born 1871) was an English footballer who played in the Football League for Stoke.

== Career ==
Sheldon was born in Stoke-upon-Trent and played for Stoke St.Peter's and then joined Stoke in the Football League. He was made back up 'keeper to Ezekiel Johnston and in two seasons with the club he played in eight matches. He left in May 1898 to play for Eccleshall.

== Career statistics ==
Club	Season	League			FA Cup		Total	
Club	Season	Division	Apps	Goals	Apps	Goals	Apps	Goals
Stoke	1896–97	First Division	5	0	0	0	5	0
Stoke	1897–98	First Division	3	0	0	0	3	0
Career Total			8	0	0	0	8	0
