= Duncan McDonald =

Duncan McDonald may refer to:

- Duncan McDonald (Scottish footballer), Scottish footballer for Woolwich Arsenal
- Duncan McDonald (English footballer), English footballer for Crewe Alexandra
- Duncan McDonald (politician) (1839–1903), merchant and political figure in Nova Scotia
- Duncan McDonald (electrical engineer) (1921–1997), Scottish industrialist

== See also ==
- Duncan MacDonald (disambiguation)
