= Hingerty =

Hingerty is a surname. Notable people with the surname include:

- Dave Hingerty (born 1969), Irish drummer and photographer
- Jim Hingerty (1875–1909), English footballer
