= Edward Parsons (footballer) =

English footballer

Personal information
- Full name: Edward Parsons
- Date of birth: January 1879
- Place of birth: Stoke-upon-Trent, England
- Date of death: 1956 (aged 77)
- Place of death: Stafford, England
- Position: Half-back

Senior career*
Years	Team	Apps	(Gls)
1896	Stafford Rangers		
1897–1900	Stoke	55	(1)
1900	Featherstone Rangers		
1901	Distillery		
1902	Stafford Rangers		
1903–1905	Brighton & Hove Albion	37	(1)
- * Club domestic league appearances and goals

Edward Parsons (January 1879 – 1956), known as Ted or Teddy Parsons, was an English footballer who played in the Football League for Stoke and in the Southern League for Brighton & Hove Albion.

== Career ==
Parsons was born in Stoke-upon-Trent and played amateur football with Stafford Rangers before joining Stoke in 1887. He was used as back up to Joe Murphy but he played in all of Stoke's matches in the FA Cup in 1898–99 as the team reached the semi-final before being beaten 3–1 by Derby County.

Murphy joined Woolwich Arsenal and Parsons took his place for the 1899–1900 and missed just two matches. But he lost his place to Billy Leech and left Stoke for Featherstone Rangers and then Brighton & Hove Albion.

== Career statistics ==
Club	Season	League			FA Cup		Total	
Club	Season	Division	Apps	Goals	Apps	Goals	Apps	Goals
Stoke	1897–98	First Division	6	0	1	0	7	0
Stoke	1898–99	First Division	13	0	6	0	19	0
Stoke	1899–1900	First Division	31	1	2	0	33	1
Stoke	1900–01	First Division	5	0	1	0	6	0
Career Total			55	1	10	0	65	1
