= Tom Hill (footballer) =

English footballer

Personal information
- Full name: Thomas Hill
- Date of birth: 1871
- Place of birth: Market Drayton, England
- Position: Outside right

Senior career*
Years	Team	Apps	(Gls)
1896	Market Drayton		
1897–1898	Stoke	5	(2)
1899	Leicester Normads		
- * Club domestic league appearances and goals

Thomas Hill (1871 – unknown) was an English footballer who played in the Football League for Stoke.

== Career ==
Hill was born in Market Drayton and played for the local football team before joining Stoke in 1897. He played five matches at the start of the 1897–98 season and scored twice against Liverpool and Derby County. However that match against Derby proved to be his final match for Stoke as he left and joined Leicester Normads.

== Career statistics ==
Club	Season	League			FA Cup		Total	
Club	Season	Division	Apps	Goals	Apps	Goals	Apps	Goals
Stoke	1897–98	First Division	5	2	0	0	5	2
Career Total			5	2	0	0	5	2
