= Harry Simpson (English footballer) =

English footballer

Personal information
- Full name: Harry Simpson
- Date of birth: 1875
- Place of birth: Stoke-upon-Trent, England
- Position: Midfielder

Senior career*
Years	Team	Apps	(Gls)
1894–1895	Crewe Alexandra	26	(2)
1896–1897	Stoke	8	(0)
1897	New Brighton Tower		
- * Club domestic league appearances and goals

Harry Simpson (born 1875) was an English footballer who played in the Football League for Crewe Alexandra and Stoke.

== Career ==
Simpson was born in Stoke-upon-Trent and began his career with nearby Crewe Alexandra. He spent the 1895–96 at Crewe making 34 appearances which included eight in the FA Cup as the "Alex" reached the first round stage. He then joined First Division Stoke for the 1896–97 season being used as a reserve and left for New Brighton Tower after playing eight matches for Stoke.

== Career statistics ==
Appearances and goals by club, season and competition
Club	Season	League			FA Cup		Total	
Club	Season	Division	Apps	Goals	Apps	Goals	Apps	Goals
Crewe Alexandra	1895–96	Second Division	26	2	8	0	34	2
Stoke	1896–97	First Division	8	0	0	0	8	0
Career total			34	2	8	0	42	2
