= William Maxwell (footballer) =

Scottish footballer and cricketer

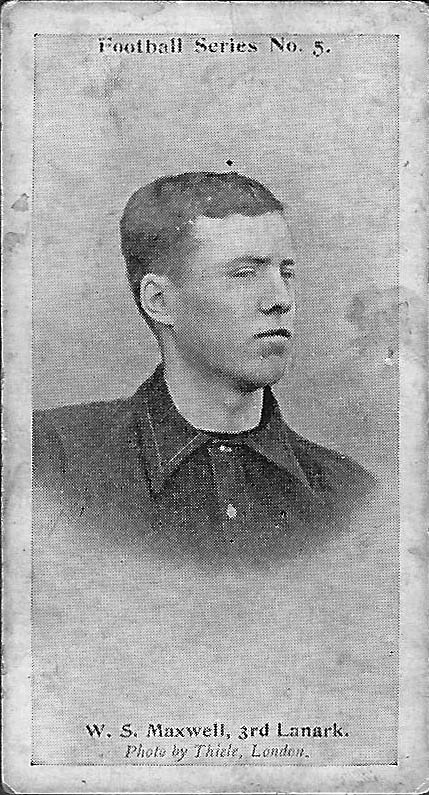

Personal information
- Full name: William Sturrock Maxwell
- Date of birth: 21 September 1876
- Place of birth: Arbroath, Scotland
- Date of death: 14 July 1940 (aged 63)
- Place of death: Kirkcaldy, Scotland
- Position: Forward

Senior career*
Years	Team	Apps	(Gls)
1892	Hearts Strollers		
1893–1894	Arbroath		
1894	Dundee	1	(1)
1894	Heart of Midlothian	1	(1)
1894–1895	Dundee	0	(0)
1895–1901	Stoke	153	(74)
1901–1902	Third Lanark	16	(10)
1902–1903	Sunderland	7	(3)
1903–1905	Millwall Athletic	54	(34)
1905–1908	Bristol City	120	(58)
1909–1910	Léopold		
Total		352	(181)

International career
1898	Scotland	1	(0)
1902	Scottish Football League XI	1	(0)

Managerial career
- 1910–1913: Belgium
- 1920–1928: Belgium
- 1937–1938: Cercle Brugge
Medal record
Men's football
Representing Belgium (as manager)
Olympic Games
Gold medal – first place	1920 Antwerp	Men's competition
- * Club domestic league appearances and goals

William Sturrock Maxwell (21 September 1876 – 14 July 1940) was a Scottish professional footballer and amateur cricketer.

He played for hometown club Arbroath, Dundee, Heart of Midlothian, Stoke, Sunderland, Third Lanark and Bristol City. He also gained one cap for the Scotland national team. He finished as the top scorer in the Scottish Football League Division One in the 1901–02 season, and later, while at Bristol City, he was the Second Division top scorer with 27 goals in the 1905–06 season. Maxwell later coached the Belgium national team.

== Football career ==
Maxwell was born in Arbroath and began his career as an amateur playing for Hearts Strollers, Arbroath, Heart of Midlothian and Dundee whilst working as a solicitor's clerk. He was persuaded by Stoke manager Bill Rowley to become professional, and he did so, joining the Potters in the summer of 1895. Maxwell scored on his Stoke debut on the opening day of the 1895–96 season, in a 2–0 win over Bolton Wanderers. He initially had to bide his time as fellow Scottish forwards Billy Dickson and Tommy Hyslop were established in the first team. Following the departure of both Dickson and Hyslop in the summer of 1896, Maxwell became Stoke's main attacking threat, and he became the club's first prolific goalscorer. He finished up as top goalscorer for five consecutive seasons, hitting 16 in 1896–97, 11 in 1897–98, 19 in 1898–99, 11 in 1899–1900 and 16 in 1900–01. During that period he took part in the annual Home Scots v Anglo-Scots international trial on four occasions, and having scored in the March 1898 fixture he was selected to play for Scotland against England two weeks later in what would be his only full cap.

Maxwell was not a typical 1890s inside-forward as most relied on strength and power, he instead used his pace to sprint away from defenders and most of his goals came in one-on-one situations with the goalkeeper. Maxwell helped Stoke reach their first FA Cup semi-final in 1899 where he scored Stoke's only goal in a 3–1 defeat against Derby County. Maxwell was renowned for his gentlemanly conduct on the pitch, but on one occasion playing against West Bromwich Albion in October 1899, he lost his temper with Albion's Abraham Jones and the pair traded blows and were both sent-off. Maxwell received a two-week suspension during which he played in a benefit match for Sheffield United's Arthur Watson. He suffered a serious knee injury in that match and missed a further ten weeks.

With his injury, Stoke decided to cash in on him, selling him to Third Lanark for £250, which turned out to be poor business as Stoke failed to find a suitable replacement and later suffered heavy financial problems. After a year back in Scotland, in which he scored 12 goals in 19 appearances (10 in Scottish Division One, the season's record total) and played for the Scottish Football League XI, he moved to Sunderland and then to Millwall Athletic where he scored 34 goals in 54 Southern League games. His final move of his career took him to Bristol City where he enjoyed great success, scoring 27 goals in 1905–06 as the Robins won the Second Division title. He then hit 19 goals in 1906–07 as they nearly won the First Division title, missing out by three points to Newcastle United.

Maxwell retired in 1909 and decided to move to Belgium to take up a coaching role with the Belgium national team.

== Cricket career ==
Outside of football, Maxwell played a single cricket match for Staffordshire in the 1904 Minor Counties Championship against Dorset. In Staffordshire's first innings, he was dismissed for 4 runs by Hubert Greenhill, becoming one of Greenhill's 8 victims in the innings. In their second innings, he opened the batting, scoring 18 unbeaten runs.

== Career statistics ==
=== Club ===
Appearances and goals by club, season and competition
Club	Season	League			FA Cup		Test Matches		Total	
Club	Season	Division	Apps	Goals	Apps	Goals	Apps	Goals	Apps	Goals
Dundee	1893–94	Scottish Division One	1	1	0	0	—		1	1
Heart of Midlothian	1894–95	Scottish Division One	1	1	0	0	—		1	1
Dundee	1894–95	Scottish Division One	0	0	5	5	—		5	5
Stoke	1895–96	First Division	23	7	4	4	—		27	11
Stoke	1896–97	First Division	29	13	2	3	—		31	16
Stoke	1897–98	First Division	21	11	2	0	3	1	26	12
Stoke	1898–99	First Division	31	16	6	3	—		37	19
Stoke	1899–1900	First Division	22	11	0	0	—		22	11
Stoke	1900–01	First Division	27	16	3	0	—		30	16
Stoke	Total		153	74	17	10	3	1	173	85
Sunderland	1902–03	First Division	7	3	0	0	—		7	3
Millwall Athletic	1903–04	Southern League	29	23			—		29	23
Millwall Athletic	1904–05	Southern League	25	11			—		25	11
Millwall Athletic	Total		54	34			—		54	34
Bristol City	1905–06	Second Division	38	26	1	1	—		39	27
Bristol City	1906–07	First Division	37	17	2	2	—		39	19
Bristol City	1907–08	First Division	34	12	2	0	—		36	12
Bristol City	1908–09	First Division	11	3	0	0	—		11	3
Bristol City	Total		120	58	5	3	—		125	61
Career Total			336	171	27	18	3	1	366	190

=== International ===
National team	Year	Apps	Goals
Scotland	1898	1	0
Total		1	0

== Honours ==
=== Player ===
- Bristol City
  - Football League Second Division: 1905–06
  - Football League First Division: runner-up 1906–07

=== Manager ===
- Belgium
  - Olympic Gold medal: 1920
  - Coupe Vanden Abeele: 1910, 1913
  - Rotterdamsch Beker: 1913
- KV Mechelen
  - Belgian First Division runner-up: 1930–31
- Cercle Brugge
  - Belgian Second Division: 1937–38
