= Jack Shaffery =

English footballer

Personal information
- Full name: John Shaffery
- Date of birth: 1874
- Place of birth: Stoke-upon-Trent, England
- Date of death: 1934 (aged 56–57)
- Position: Outside right

Senior career*
Years	Team	Apps	(Gls)
1896	Northwood		
1897–1898	Stoke	4	(0)
1898	Hanley Swifts		
- * Club domestic league appearances and goals

John "Jack" Shaffery (1877 – 14 May 1934) was an English footballer who played in the Football League for Stoke.

== Career ==
Shaffery was born in Stoke-upon-Trent and played amateur football with Northwood before joining Stoke in 1897. He played in five matches for the "Potters" during the 1897–98 season before returning to amateur status with Hanley Swifts.

== Career statistics ==
Appearances and goals by club, season and competition
Club	Season	League			FA Cup		Total	
Club	Season	Division	Apps	Goals	Apps	Goals	Apps	Goals
Stoke	1897–98	First Division	4	0	1	0	5	0
Career Total			4	0	1	0	5	0
