= Andrew Smith (footballer, born 1879) =

Scottish footballer

Personal information
- Date of birth: 1879
- Place of birth: Slamannan, Scotland
- Date of death: 1960 (aged 80–81)
- Place of death: Glasgow, Scotland
- Position: Forward

Senior career*
Years	Team	Apps	(Gls)
1895	Vale of Garron		
1896	East Stirlingshire		
1897–1898	Stoke	0	(0)
1897	Stenhousemuir		
1898	East Stirlingshire		
1899	Clackmannan		
1900–1903	West Bromwich Albion	23	(8)
1903	Newton Heath	0	(0)
1903–1906	Bristol Rovers	70	(35)
1906	Millwall Athletic		
1906	Swindon Town	28	(11)
1907	Leyton		
1907	Bristol Rovers	0	(0)
1908	Treharris		
1909	East Stirlingshire		
1909	Vale of Leven		
1910–1912	Wednesbury Old Athletic		
1912	Brierley Hill Alliance		
- * Club domestic league appearances and goals

Andrew W. Smith (1879–1960) was a Scottish professional footballer who played in the Football League for West Bromwich Albion, the Scottish Football League for East Stirlingshire, and the Southern Football League for several clubs.

== Career ==
After spells with East Stirlingshire, Vale of Garron and Stoke, Smith joined West Bromwich Albion in 1900. He made 23 appearances in the Football League, scoring eight times. He had a brief spell with Newton Heath early in 1903, before joining Bristol Rovers the same year. He scored 35 goals in 70 appearances for Rovers.

While at Bristol Rovers he won a Southern League title in the 1904–05 season, when he was also the division's top goalscorer. He then had spells with Millwall Athletic, Swindon Town and Leyton, before re-joining Rovers in 1908.

He ended his career in the midlands, playing firstly for Wednesbury Old Athletic, then finally Brierley Hill Alliance. After finishing his footballing career he returned to his native Scotland, where he worked in a steel factory and as a docker. He died in Glasgow in 1960.

== Career statistics ==
Club	Season	League			FA Cup		Total	
Club	Season	Division	Apps	Goals	Apps	Goals	Apps	Goals
Stoke	1897–98	First Division	0	0	0	0	0	0
West Bromwich Albion	1900–01	First Division	8	2	2	0	10	2
West Bromwich Albion	1901–02	Second Division	13	6	0	0	13	6
West Bromwich Albion	1902–03	First Division	2	0	0	0	2	0
Career Total			28	8	2	0	30	8
