= Jack Eccles (footballer) =

English footballer

Personal information
- Full name: John Eccles
- Date of birth: 31 March 1869
- Place of birth: Stoke-upon-Trent, England
- Date of death: 2 February 1932 (aged 62)
- Place of death: Small Heath, Birmingham, England
- Position: Full-back

Senior career*
Years	Team	Apps	(Gls)
1889	London Road		
1890–1900	Stoke	161	(1)
- * Club domestic league appearances and goals

John Eccles (31 March 1869 – 2 February 1932) was an English footballer who played in the Football League for Stoke.

== Football career ==
Eccles was born in Stoke-upon-Trent and began his career with local non-league side London Road. In March 1890, whilst playing for London Road, Eccles was spotted by Stoke Swifts (Stoke Reserves) manager William Heath waiting at Stoke station for a train to Leek, where he was due to play. With the Swifts a man short, Heath convinced Eccles to turn out for them instead, he played at half-back and impressed enough to be offered terms. From then on Eccles built his reputation as a redoubtable kicker, once scoring from the halfway line against Stockport County reserves. He initially provided back up to England international pair Tommy Clare and Alf Underwood. However at just 5 ft 7 in and 11 st Eccles looked the complete opposite to the former England internationals. Underwood suffered a career ending injury in the 1893–94 season enabling Eccles to take his place. He became Stoke's entrusted free-kick taker however he only scored one goal in his career which came in a 3–2 defeat against Bolton Wanderers in September 1896.

Eccles robust, no-nonsense style induced him to concede more than his share of free-kicks and penalties. Early in his career he would react badly to refereeing decisions which went against him, which gave him a reputation for dourness. In the 1897–98 season Stoke finished bottom of the First Division and had to play in test matches against Newcastle United and Burnley. In the final match against Burnley both sides needed a draw to be in the First Division for the following campaign and so both sides didn't attempt to score and the match ended 0–0. Following this obvious exploit of the rules the League scrapped the test match system in favour of automatic promotion and relegation.

Eccles' partnership with the equally rugged but more skilful Tom Robertson was a major factor in Stoke's progression to the semi-final of the FA Cup in 1898–99. Stoke lost 3–1 to Derby County with Eccles being blamed for Derby's third goal, Eccles allowing John Goodall to beat him and cross to Steve Bloomer to complete his hat-trick. Despite been often found wanting at the highest level Eccles was awarded a benefit game against Manchester City in September 1898 for his fine service to Stoke. He captained the side in 1899–1900 before losing his place in the side to Peter Durber. He spent the 1901–02 season with Burslem Port Vale's reserve side, but returned to Stoke in the summer of 1902, becoming club trainer. He remained in the role until the club went bankrupt in 1908 and he joined Birmingham as trainer. He died in Small Heath, Birmingham on 2 February 1932 at the age of 62.

== Professional Baseball ==
In 1890 Eccles played professional baseball for Stoke in the National League of Baseball of Great Britain.

== Personal life ==
Eccles and his wife had 14 children, one of whom, Joe later played for Aston Villa and Northampton Town.

== Career statistics ==
Appearances and goals by club, season and competition
Club	Season	League			FA Cup		Test Match		Total	
Club	Season	Division	Apps	Goals	Apps	Goals	Apps	Goals	Apps	Goals
Stoke	1889–90	Football League	3	0	0	0	—		3	0
Stoke	1890–91	Football Alliance	1	0	0	0	—		1	0
Stoke	1891–92	Football League	0	0	0	0	—		0	0
Stoke	1892–93	First Division	0	0	0	0	—		0	0
Stoke	1893–94	First Division	11	0	2	0	—		13	0
Stoke	1894–95	First Division	29	0	2	0	—		31	0
Stoke	1895–96	First Division	28	0	4	0	—		32	0
Stoke	1896–97	First Division	13	1	1	0	—		14	1
Stoke	1897–98	First Division	27	0	3	0	4	0	34	0
Stoke	1898–99	First Division	21	0	6	0	—		27	0
Stoke	1899–1900	First Division	26	0	2	0	—		28	0
Stoke	1900–01	First Division	2	0	1	0	—		3	0
Career total			161	1	21	0	4	0	186	1

== Honours ==
with Stoke

- Football Alliance champions: 1890–91
