= Albert Boardman =

English footballer (1870–1943)

Personal information
- Full name: Albert Charles Boardman
- Date of birth: 4 December 1870
- Place of birth: Stoke-upon-Trent, England
- Date of death: 1943 (aged 72–73)
- Position: Goalkeeper

Senior career*
Years	Team	Apps	(Gls)
1894–1895	Burslem Port Vale	0	(0)
1895–1897	Stoke	4	(0)
1897–1???	Dresden United		
- * Club domestic league appearances and goals

Albert Boardman (4 December 1870 – 1943) was an English footballer who played in the Football League for Stoke.

== Career ==
Boardman was born in Stoke-upon-Trent and was associated with Burslem Port Vale before joining Stoke in 1895. He was made as back-up goalkeeper to George Clawley and managed to make just four First Division appearances in two seasons. He later went on to play for non-League Dresden United.

== Career statistics ==
Appearances and goals by club, season and competition
Club	Season	League			FA Cup		Total	
Club	Season	Division	Apps	Goals	Apps	Goals	Apps	Goals
Burslem Port Vale	1894–95	Second Division	0	0	0	0	0	0
Stoke	1895–96	First Division	3	0	0	0	3	0
Stoke	1896–97	First Division	1	0	0	0	1	0
Career total			4	0	0	0	4	0
