= Jimmy McGeachan =

Scottish footballer

Personal information
- Full name: James McGeachan
- Date of birth: 1871
- Place of birth: Govan, Scotland
- Date of death: 1903 (aged 32)
- Position: Defender

Senior career*
Years	Team	Apps	(Gls)
1893–1894	Hibernian	20	(3)
1894–1896	Bolton Wanderers	69	(5)
1897–1898	Stoke	4	(0)
1898	Hibernian	1	(0)
1899	Bolton Wanderers	0	(0)
- * Club domestic league appearances and goals

James McGeachan (1871–1903) was a Scottish footballer who played in the Football League for Stoke.

== Career ==
McGeachan was born in Govan and began his career with Hibernian before moving south to Bolton Wanderers in 1894. After two years with the Lancashire club he moved on to Stoke. He struggled to get in to the side ahead of Alf Wood and after four appearances left for a short return to Hibs. He then had an unsuccessful second spell with Bolton.

== Career statistics ==
Appearances and goals by club, season and competition
Club	Season	League			FA Cup		Total	
Club	Season	Division	Apps	Goals	Apps	Goals	Apps	Goals
Hibernian	1893–94	Scottish Division Two	15	1	1	0	16	1
Hibernian	1894–95	Scottish Division Two	5	2	0	0	5	2
Hibernian	Total		20	3	1	0	21	3
Bolton Wanderers	1894–95	First Division	16	2	3	0	19	3
Bolton Wanderers	1895–96	First Division	27	2	5	0	32	2
Bolton Wanderers	1896–97	First Division	24	1	4	0	28	1
Bolton Wanderers	1897–98	First Division	2	0	0	0	2	0
Bolton Wanderers	Total		69	5	12	0	81	5
Stoke	1897–98	First Division	4	0	2	0	6	0
Hibernian	1898–99	Scottish Division One	1	0	1	0	2	0
Career total			94	8	16	0	110	8
