= Arthur Roberts (footballer, born 1876) =

English footballer (born 1876)

Personal information
- Full name: Arthur Roberts
- Date of birth: 1876
- Place of birth: Newcastle-Under-Lyme, England
- Position: Inside left

Senior career*
Years	Team	Apps	(Gls)
1898	Newcastle Casuals		
1899–1900	Stoke	2	(0)
1900	Tunstall Rangers		
- * Club domestic league appearances and goals

Arthur Roberts (born 1876) was an English footballer who played in the Football League for Stoke.

== Career ==
Roberts played with amateur side Newcastle Casuals in his home town of Newcastle-Under-Lyme before joining Stoke in 1899. He played twice for Stoke during the 1899–1900 season before returning to amateur football with Tunstall Rangers.

== Career statistics ==
Club	Season	League			FA Cup		Total	
Club	Season	Division	Apps	Goals	Apps	Goals	Apps	Goals
Stoke	1899–1900	First Division	2	0	0	0	2	0
Career Total			2	0	0	0	2	0
