= Harvey Whittaker =

English footballer

Personal information
- Full name: Harvey Whittaker
- Date of birth: 1875
- Place of birth: Congleton, England
- Date of death: 1937 (aged 61–62)
- Position: Outside right

Senior career*
Years	Team	Apps	(Gls)
1898	Congleton Hornets		
1899–1900	Stoke	4	(0)
1900	Newcastle Town		
- * Club domestic league appearances and goals

Harvey Whittaker (1875 – 1937) was an English footballer who played in the Football League for Stoke.

== Career ==
Whittaker was born in Congleton and played for local amateur side Congleton Hornets before joining Stoke in 1899. He played four matches for Stoke during the 1899–1900 season. He later played for Newcastle Town.

== Career statistics ==
Appearances and goals by club, season and competition
Club	Season	League			FA Cup		Total	
Club	Season	Division	Apps	Goals	Apps	Goals	Apps	Goals
Stoke	1899–1900	First Division	4	0	0	0	4	0
Career total			4	0	0	0	4	0
