= 1896–97 Stoke F.C. season =

Stoke
1896–97 season
- Chairman: Mr S. Barker
- Manager: Bill Rowley
- Stadium: Victoria Ground
- Football League First Division: 13th (25 Points)
- FA Cup: Second Round
- Top goalscorer: League: William Maxwell (13); All: William Maxwell (16)
- Highest home attendance: 8,000 vs Everton (2 January 1897)
- Lowest home attendance: 2,500 vs Bury (12 April 1897)
- Average home league attendance: 5,400
Home colours

The 1896–97 season was Stoke's eighth season in the Football League.

After last season's success of finishing in 6th position there was high hopes that it would signal a change in the club's fortunes. Alas it was a disappointing season for Stoke as little progress was made and they finished the season in 13th position with 25 points.

== Season review ==
=== League ===
As the 1896–97 season beckoned there was a lot of talk of Stoke purchasing the football pitch at the cricket ground in the town, with a considerable amount of financial backing promised. However this never materialised much to the disappointment of chairman Mr S. Barker. During the campaign itself a total of 16 players made their senior debuts for the club including Zeke Johnston, Stoke's first Irishman signed from Burnley. There was little progress in the league with a 13th-place finish. The best result of the season saw Stoke beat Liverpool 6–1 in February 1897. Long serving forward Billy Dickson retired as did half-back Davy Brodie.

=== FA Cup ===
After beating Glossop 5–2 in the first round Stoke lost 2–1 in the next to Preston North End.

== Final league table ==
Pos	Team	Pld	W	D	L	GF	GA	GAv	Pts	Relegation
11	Nottingham Forest	30	9	8	13	44	49	0.898	26	
12	West Bromwich Albion	30	10	6	14	33	56	0.589	26	
13	Stoke	30	11	3	16	48	59	0.814	25	
14	Blackburn Rovers	30	11	3	16	35	62	0.565	25	
15	Sunderland (O)	30	7	9	14	34	47	0.723	23	Qualification for test matches

Source: World Football
Rules for classification: 1) Points; 2) Goal average; 3) Goals scored
(O) Play-off winners

== Results ==
Stoke's score comes first

=== Legend ===
Win	Draw	Loss

=== Football League First Division ===
Match	Date	Opponent	Venue	Result	Attendance	Scorers
1	2 September 1896	Aston Villa	A	1–2	5,000	Schofield
2	5 September 1896	Wolverhampton Wanderers	H	2–1	7,000	Johnson, Wood
3	12 September 1896	Nottingham Forest	A	0–4	3,500	
4	19 September 1896	Bolton Wanderers	H	2–3	4,000	Schofield, Eccles
5	26 September 1896	The Wednesday	A	3–4	6,000	Schofield, Wood, Johnson
6	10 October 1896	Wolverhampton Wanderers	A	2–1	5,000	W Maxwell, Wood
7	17 October 1896	Nottingham Forest	H	3–0	5,000	W Maxwell, Schofield, Johnson
8	24 October 1896	Bolton Wanderers	A	0–4	4,000	
9	31 October 1896	Aston Villa	H	0–2	4,000	
10	7 November 1896	Derby County	A	1–5	3,000	W Maxwell
11	9 November 1896	Preston North End	H	2–1	4,000	W Maxwell, Eardley
12	14 November 1896	Bury	A	2–4	3,000	A Maxwell, Wood
13	21 November 1896	West Bromwich Albion	H	2–2	6,200	W Maxwell (2)
14	28 November 1896	Preston North End	A	0–3	5,000	
15	5 December 1896	Derby County	H	2–2	5,000	W Maxwell (2)
16	12 December 1896	West Bromwich Albion	A	2–1	1,105	W Maxwell (2)
17	19 December 1896	Everton	A	2–4	7,000	W Maxwell, Schofield
18	2 January 1897	Everton	H	2–3	8,000	W Maxwell, Schofield
19	9 January 1897	Burnley	A	3–1	3,000	A Maxwell (2), Schofield
20	16 January 1897	Liverpool	A	0–1	7,000	
21	23 January 1897	The Wednesday	H	0–0	5,000	
22	6 February 1897	Liverpool	H	6–1	7,000	Schofield (2), W Maxwell, Hill (2), Hingerty
23	20 February 1897	Sunderland	A	1–4	2,000	Schofield
24	27 February 1897	Burnley	H	3–2	8,000	Hill (2), Hingerty
25	20 March 1897	Blackburn Rovers	A	1–2	8,000	Hingerty
26	27 March 1897	Sheffield United	A	0–1	2,000	
27	3 April 1897	Sunderland	H	0–1	5,000	
28	10 April 1897	Blackburn Rovers	H	1–0	5,000	Hill
29	12 April 1897	Bury	H	3–0	2,500	Hill, Schofield, Darroch (o.g.)
30	15 April 1897	Sheffield United	H	2–0	3,000	Hingerty, W Maxwell

=== FA Cup ===
Round	Date	Opponent	Venue	Result	Attendance	Scorers
R1	30 January 1897	Glossop	H	5–2	2,000	W Maxwell (2), Schofield, Hingerty (2)
R2	13 February 1897	Preston North End	A	1–2	6,000	W Maxwell

== Squad statistics ==
Pos.	Name	League		FA Cup		Total	
Pos.	Name	Apps	Goals	Apps	Goals	Apps	Goals
GK	(England) Albert Boardman	1	0	0	0	1	0
GK	Zeke Johnston	16	0	2	0	18	0
GK	(England) Fred Latham	5	0	0	0	5	0
GK	(England) Bill Rowley	4	0	0	0	4	0
GK	(England) Fred Sheldon	5	0	0	0	5	0
FB	(England) Tommy Clare	30	0	2	0	32	0
FB	(England) Peter Durber	17	0	2	0	19	0
FB	(England) Jack Eccles	13	1	1	0	14	1
HB	(England) Lucien Boullemier	7	0	0	0	7	0
HB	(Scotland) Davy Brodie	17	0	1	0	18	0
HB	(Scotland) Bill Fearns	4	0	0	0	4	0
HB	(Scotland) Jimmy Grewer	22	0	2	0	24	0
HB	(England) Ted McDonald	2	0	0	0	2	0
HB	(England) Jim Peacock	1	0	0	0	1	0
HB	(England) Harry Simpson	8	0	0	0	8	0
HB	(England) Arthur Rowley	25	0	2	0	27	0
HB	(England) Alf Wood	12	4	0	0	12	4
FW	(Scotland) Billy Baird	3	0	0	0	3	0
FW	(England) Arthur Bentley	5	0	0	0	5	0
FW	(England) Samuel Cole	0	0	0	0	0	0
FW	(Scotland) Billy Dickson	4	0	0	0	4	0
FW	(England) Billy Eardley	10	1	0	0	10	1
FW	(England) Billy Heames	3	0	0	0	3	0
FW	(Scotland) Jimmy Hill	10	6	1	0	11	6
FW	(England) Jim Hingerty	10	4	2	2	12	6
FW	(England) Freddie Johnson	14	3	1	0	15	3
FW	(Scotland) Allan Maxwell	23	3	2	0	25	3
FW	(Scotland) William Maxwell	29	13	2	3	31	16
FW	(England) Joe Schofield	29	12	2	1	31	13
FW	(Scotland) Samuel Woods	1	0	0	0	1	0
–	Own goals	–	1	–	0	–	1
