= 1895–96 Stoke F.C. season =

Stoke
1895–96 season
- Chairman: Mr S. Barker
- Manager: Bill Rowley
- Stadium: Victoria Ground
- Football League First Division: 6th (30 Points)
- FA Cup: Third Round
- Top goalscorer: League: Tommy Hyslop (17); All: Tommy Hyslop (21)
- Highest home attendance: 12,000 vs West Bromwich Albion (21 September 1895)
- Lowest home attendance: 1,000 vs Burnley (7 December 1895)
- Average home league attendance: 7,600
Home colours

The 1895–96 season was Stoke's seventh season in the Football League.

Stoke enjoyed their best season yet under new manager Bill Rowley finishing in 6th position with 30 points. Stoke only drew one game this season and that came in the FA Cup against Burnley.

== Season Review ==
=== League ===
In the summer of 1895 the club had become a Limited liability company and long serving goalkeeper Bill Rowley was given the position of secretary-manager. One of Rowley's best pieces of business was to bring William Maxwell to the club from Dundee. Maxwell went on to score 75 goals in 156 matches in six seasons with Stoke. Before the start of the season, there was a mini-exodus of players to Southampton St. Mary's such as Jack Farrell, Samuel Meston, Willie Naughton and trainer Bill Dawson. Some players would later return to Stoke after their spell on the south coast.

One of Stoke's most bizarre transfer deals took place in February 1896 when they signed Allan Maxwell from Darwen. Instead of requesting a transfer fee Darwen wanted a set of wrought iron gates to be supplied by Stoke. On the pitch Stoke finished their highest position yet of sixth place, picking up 30 points in the process. No league draw was forthcoming for Stoke their only draw came in the FA Cup against Burnley.

=== FA Cup ===
For the second season running Stoke were knocked out of the FA Cup by Wolverhampton Wanderers this time 3–0 in the third round. Prior to this Stoke were in free scoring form beating Tottenham Hotspur 5–0 and Burnley 7–1.

== Final league table ==
Pos	Team	Pld	W	D	L	GF	GA	GAv	Pts
4	Bolton Wanderers	30	16	5	9	49	37	1.324	37
5	Sunderland	30	15	7	8	52	41	1.268	37
6	Stoke	30	15	0	15	56	47	1.191	30
7	The Wednesday	30	12	5	13	44	53	0.830	29
8	Blackburn Rovers	30	12	5	13	40	50	0.800	29

Source: World Football
Rules for classification: 1) Points; 2) Goal average; 3) Goals scored

== Results ==
Stoke's score comes first

=== Legend ===
Win	Draw	Loss

=== Football League First Division ===
Match	Date	Opponent	Venue	Result	Attendance	Scorers
1	2 September 1895	Bolton Wanderers	H	2–0	7,000	Dickson, W Maxwell
2	7 September 1895	Derby County	H	2–1	6,000	Schofield (2)
3	14 September 1895	Small Heath	A	2–1	6,000	Dickson, Hyslop
4	21 September 1895	West Bromwich Albion	H	3–1	12,000	Hyslop (3)
5	28 September 1895	Sheffield United	A	0–1	6,000	
6	5 October 1895	Wolverhampton Wanderers	A	0–1	4,000	
7	12 October 1895	Derby County	A	1–2	8,000	Wood
8	19 October 1895	Small Heath	H	6–1	8,000	Schofield (3), Hyslop, W Maxwell, Grewer
9	26 October 1895	Bolton Wanderers	A	1–3	4,000	Hyslop
10	2 November 1895	Sheffield United	H	4–0	8,000	Hyslop (2), Dickson, Clare
11	9 November 1895	West Bromwich Albion	A	0–1	3,500	
12	11 November 1895	Preston North End	H	4–0	7,000	Hyslop (2), Lonie (2)
13	16 November 1895	The Wednesday	A	1–2	4,000	W Maxwell
14	23 November 1895	Wolverhampton Wanderers	H	4–1	5,000	Lonie, Dickson (3)
15	28 November 1895	Nottingham Forest	A	0–4	4,000	
16	30 November 1895	Bury	A	1–0	2,500	Hyslop
17	7 December 1895	Burnley	H	2–1	1,000	Lonie, Schofield
18	14 December 1895	Everton	A	2–7	10,000	Schofield, Sandland
19	21 December 1895	The Wednesday	H	5–0	4,000	Hyslop (3), Dickson, Proctor
20	25 December 1895	Preston North End	A	1–0	5,000	Proctor
21	26 December 1895	Bury	H	0–2	4,000	
22	4 January 1896	Aston Villa	H	1–2	12,000	Schofield
23	22 February 1896	Aston Villa	A	2–5	10,000	Dickson, W Maxwell
24	14 March 1896	Sunderland	H	5–0	6,000	W Maxwell, Heames, Hyslop, A Maxwell, McNeill (o.g.)
25	16 March 1896	Burnley	A	0–2	3,000	
26	21 March 1896	Nottingham Forest	H	1–0	5,000	Hyslop
27	28 March 1896	Sunderland	A	1–4	3,000	Hyslop
28	3 April 1896	Blackburn Rovers	A	1–3	3,000	Turner
29	4 April 1896	Blackburn Rovers	H	3–0	3,500	W Maxwell (2), Johnson
30	11 April 1896	Everton	H	1–2	3,000	Schofield

=== FA Cup ===
Round	Date	Opponent	Venue	Result	Attendance	Scorers
R1	1 February 1896	Tottenham Hotspur	H	5–0	6,000	W Maxwell (3), Dickson, A Maxwell
R2	15 February 1896	Burnley	A	1–1	10,000	Dickson
R2 Replay	20 February 1896	Burnley	H	7–1	4,000	Dickson, Hyslop (4), A Maxwell, W Maxwell
R3	29 February 1896	Wolverhampton Wanderers	A	0–3	16,000	

== Squad statistics ==
Pos.	Name	League		FA Cup		Total	
Pos.	Name	Apps	Goals	Apps	Goals	Apps	Goals
GK	(England) Albert Boardman	3	0	0	0	3	0
GK	(England) George Clawley	26	0	4	0	30	0
GK	(England) Bill Rowley	1	0	0	0	1	0
FB	(England) Bill Capewell	1	0	1	0	2	0
FB	(England) Tommy Clare	30	1	4	0	34	1
FB	(England) Jack Eccles	28	0	4	0	32	0
FB	(England) Duncan McDonald	0	0	0	0	0	0
HB	(Scotland) Davy Brodie	29	0	2	0	31	0
HB	(Scotland) Jimmy Grewer	29	1	4	0	33	1
HB	(Scotland) Tom Robertson	13	0	2	0	15	0
HB	(England) Edgar Sanderson	0	0	0	0	0	0
HB	(England) Jimmy Turner	24	1	3	0	27	1
HB	(England) Alf Wood	4	1	0	0	4	1
FW	(England) Arthur Brookfield	2	0	0	0	2	0
FW	(Scotland) Billy Dickson	30	8	4	3	34	11
FW	(England) Billy Heames	2	1	0	0	2	1
FW	(Scotland) Tommy Hyslop	27	17	3	4	30	21
FW	(England) Freddie Johnson	8	1	1	0	9	1
FW	(Scotland) Tom Lonie	9	4	0	0	9	4
FW	(Scotland) Allan Maxwell	8	1	4	2	12	3
FW	(Scotland) William Maxwell	23	7	4	4	27	11
FW	(England) Edward Proctor	3	2	0	0	3	2
FW	(England) Teddy Sandland	1	1	0	0	1	1
FW	(Scotland) Bill Sawers	1	0	0	0	1	0
FW	(England) Joe Schofield	28	9	4	0	32	9
–	Own goals	–	1	–	0	–	1
