= Edgar Sanderson (footballer) =

English footballer

Personal information
- Full name: Edgar John Sanderson
- Date of birth: 16 March 1874
- Place of birth: Elkington, Lincolnshire, England
- Date of death: Unknown
- Position: Full back

Senior career*
Years	Team	Apps	(Gls)
1895–1896	Stoke	0	(0)
1896	Jarrow		
1897–1899	Notts County	34	(0)
- * Club domestic league appearances and goals

Edgar Sanderson (16 March 1874 – after 1898) was an English footballer who played for Jarrow, Notts County and Stoke.

== Career statistics ==
Club	Season	League			FA Cup		Total	
Club	Season	Division	Apps	Goals	Apps	Goals	Apps	Goals
Stoke	1895–96	First Division	0	0	0	0	0	0
Notts County	1897–98	First Division	5	0	0	0	5	0
Notts County	1898–99	First Division	29	0	2	0	31	0
Career total			34	0	2	0	36	0
