= George Tooth =

English footballer

Personal information
- Full name: George Tooth
- Date of birth: 1874
- Place of birth: Stoke-upon-Trent, England
- Position: Outside left

Senior career*
| Years | Team | Apps | (Gls) |
| 1897 | Congleton Hornets | | |
| 1898–1899 | Stoke | 5 | (2) |
| 1900 | Stafford Rangers | | |
- * Club domestic league appearances and goals

George Tooth (1869 – after 1899) was an English footballer who played in the Football League for Stoke.

== Career ==
Tooth was born in Stoke-upon-Trent and played for Congleton Hornets before joining Stoke in 1898. He played five matches for Stoke scoring once against Everton in April 1899. He later went on to play for Stafford Rangers.

== Career statistics ==
| Club | Season | League | | | FA Cup | | Total | |
| Club | Season | Division | Apps | Goals | Apps | Goals | Apps | Goals |
|---|---|---|---|---|---|---|---|---|
| Stoke | 1898–99 | First Division | 1 | 1 | 0 | 0 | 1 | 1 |
| Stoke | 1899–1900 | First Division | 4 | 1 | 0 | 0 | 4 | 1 |
| Career total | | | 5 | 2 | 0 | 0 | 5 | 2 |
