= Jimmy Grewer =

Scottish footballer

Personal information
- Full name: James Grewer
- Date of birth: 1865
- Place of birth: Dundee, Scotland
- Date of death: 1950 (aged 84–85)
- Position: Defender

Senior career*
Years	Team	Apps	(Gls)
1891	Dundee		
1892	Sunderland Albion		
1893–1894	Middlesbrough Ironopolis	26	(2)
1894–1897	Stoke	75	(1)
1898	Gravesend United		
Total		101	(3)
- * Club domestic league appearances and goals

James Grewer (1865 – 1950) was a Scottish footballer who played in the Football League for Middlesbrough Ironopolis and Stoke.

== Career ==
Grewer was born in Dundee and started playing football south of the border at Sunderland Albion. He spent a season at Middlesbrough Ironopolis before joining Stoke in 1894. He spent four seasons at the Victoria Ground making 83 appearances scoring once.

== Career statistics ==
Appearances and goals by club, season and competition
Club	Season	League			FA Cup		Test Match		Total	
Club	Season	Division	Apps	Goals	Apps	Goals	Apps	Goals	Apps	Goals
Middlesbrough Ironopolis	1893–94	Second Division	26	2	2	0	–		28	2
Stoke	1894–95	First Division	15	0	2	0	1	0	18	0
Stoke	1895–96	First Division	29	1	4	0	–		33	1
Stoke	1896–97	First Division	22	0	2	0	–		24	0
Stoke	1897–98	First Division	9	0	0	0	0	0	9	0
Stoke	Total		75	1	8	0	1	0	84	1
Career total			101	3	10	0	1	0	112	3
