= Duncan MacDonald =

Duncan MacDonald may refer to:

- Duncan MacDonald (politician) (1885–1977), Australian politician
- Duncan Black MacDonald (1863–1943), American Orientalist
- Duncan MacDonald (athlete) (born 1949), American Olympic long-distance runner

== See also ==
- Duncan McDonald (disambiguation)
