= Harry Mellor (footballer, born 1878) =

English footballer

Personal information
- Full name: Harold Halden Mellor
- Date of birth: March 1878
- Place of birth: Stoke-upon-Trent, England
- Date of death: 1950 (aged 72)
- Place of death: Stoke-on-Trent, England
- Position: Inside right

Senior career*
Years	Team	Apps	(Gls)
1895	Crewe Alexandra	2	(0)
–	Burslem Port Vale	0	(0)
–	Dresden United		
1897–1900	Stoke	29	(3)
1900–1901	Grimsby Town	33	(4)
–	Brighton & Hove Albion		
Total		64	(8)
- * Club domestic league appearances and goals

Harold Halden Mellor (March 1878 – 1950) was an English footballer who played in the Football League for Crewe Alexandra, Grimsby Town and Stoke.

== Career ==
Mellor was born in Stoke-upon-Trent and started his career with nearby Crewe Alexandra. After two appearances in the League for the "Alex" he returned to the hometown. He joined Burslem Port Vale and then Dresden United. He joined Stoke in 1897 and became a regular in the side in a difficult 1897–98 season which saw Stoke finish bottom of the First Division and entering into the end of season test match. Stoke came out victorious albeit in controversial fashion, Stoke and Burnley playing for a 0–0 draw, which saw the FA introduce automatic promotion and relegation.

Mellor lost his place in the side to Jack Kennedy in 1898–99 and left for Grimsby Town in 1900. After one season with Grimsby he moved south to Brighton & Hove Albion.

== Career statistics ==
Appearances and goals by club, season and competition
Club	Season	League			FA Cup		Test Match		Total	
Club	Season	Division	Apps	Goals	Apps	Goals	Apps	Goals	Apps	Goals
Crewe Alexandra	1895–96	Second Division	2	0	0	0	–		2	0
Stoke	1897–98	First Division	20	2	3	1	3	0	26	3
Stoke	1898–99	First Division	6	1	0	0	–		6	1
Stoke	1899–1900	First Division	3	0	0	0	–		3	0
Stoke	Total		29	3	3	1	3	0	35	4
Grimsby Town	1899–1900	Second Division	33	4	1	0	–		34	4
Career total			64	7	4	1	3	0	71	8
