= 1897–98 Stoke F.C. season =

Stoke
1897–98 season
- Chairman: Mr J Fenton
- Manager: Horace Austerberry
- Stadium: Victoria Ground
- Football League First Division: 16th (24 Points)
- FA Cup: Second Round
- Test Matches: Winner
- Top goalscorer: League: William Maxwell (11); All: William Maxwell (12)
- Highest home attendance: 15,000 vs Bury (27 December 1897)
- Lowest home attendance: 2,000 vs Nottingham Forest (20 November 1897)
- Average home league attendance: 7,350
Home colours

The 1897–98 season was Stoke's ninth season in the Football League.

It was another season of struggle for Stoke who finished bottom of the First Division on goal average level on points with five teams. They entered the test matches for the second time against Newcastle United and Burnley and again came out victorious. However it was in controversial circumstances as in the final test match against Burnley, both sides needed a draw to be in the First Division for next season and for 90 minutes the Stoke and Burnley players did not attempt to win and the match finished in a 0–0 draw. After this obvious exploitation of the rules the league scrapped the test match system in favour of automatic promotion and relegation.

== Season Review ==
=== League ===
In September 1897 Horace Austerberry was appointed secretary-manager of Stoke in succession of Bill Rowley who became general secretary. Also Mr J. T. Fenton assumed the role of chairman taking over from Mr. S. Barker. The Stoke directors continued to search in Scotland for quality players following the success of William Maxwell and they did find one in the form of Alex Raisbeck who went on to gain international caps for his country unfortunately he only played eight matches for Stoke before deciding to join Liverpool.

The bottom five teams in the First Division finished with 24 points but Stoke had the poorest goal average of them all and took bottom spot. They had to play the top two sides from the Second Division, Burnley and Newcastle United. Stoke came through successfully, beating each side once and drawing with Burnley to stay up.

In the final test match Stoke and Burnley needed a draw to be in the First Division next season. It finished 0–0 after a farcical 90 minutes during which neither side put in a challenge or had a shot at goal and at one point a few fans in the crowd held on to the ball and refused to return it to the players. After this obvious exploit of the rules the league scrapped the test match system in favour of automatic promotion and relegation.

=== FA Cup ===
Stoke beat Bury 2–1 in the first round but crashed out 5–1 to Everton in the second round replay.

== Final league table ==
Pos	Team	Pld	W	D	L	GF	GA	GAv	Pts	Relegation
12	Preston North End	30	8	8	14	35	43	0.814	24	
13	Notts County	30	8	8	14	36	46	0.783	24	
14	Bury	30	8	8	14	39	51	0.765	24	
15	Blackburn Rovers (Note: Blackburn Rovers were initially relegated but were later reprieved due to the First Division expanding to 18 teams for the following season.)	30	7	10	13	39	54	0.722	24	Qualification for test matches
16	Stoke (O)	30	8	8	14	35	55	0.636	24	Qualification for test matches

Source: World Football
Rules for classification: 1) Points; 2) Goal average; 3) Goals scored
(O) Play-off winners

== Results ==
Stoke's score comes first

=== Legend ===
Win	Draw	Loss

=== Football League First Division ===
Match	Date	Opponent	Venue	Result	Attendance	Scorers
1	2 September 1897	Notts County	H	2–0	3,500	Maxwell (2)
2	4 September 1897	Liverpool	H	2–2	4,000	Maxwell, T Hill
3	11 September 1897	Sheffield United	A	3–4	10,000	Maxwell (2), Thickett (o.g.)
4	18 September 1897	Blackburn Rovers	H	2–1	8,000	Mellor, Schofield
5	25 September 1897	West Bromwich Albion	A	0–2	8,200	
6	2 October 1897	Derby County	H	2–1	5,000	Wood, Maxwell
7	9 October 1897	Liverpool	A	0–4	16,000	
8	16 October 1897	Wolverhampton Wanderers	H	0–2	10,000	
9	23 October 1897	Notts County	A	0–4	4,000	
10	30 October 1897	West Bromwich Albion	H	0–0	6,400	
11	6 November 1897	Derby County	A	1–4	10,000	T Hill
12	8 November 1897	Preston North End	H	1–2	5,000	J Hill
13	13 November 1897	Bolton Wanderers	A	1–2	2,000	Pugh
14	20 November 1897	Nottingham Forest	H	1–2	2,000	Wood
15	4 December 1897	Sunderland	A	0–4	3,500	
16	11 December 1897	Sheffield United	H	2–1	7,000	J Hill, Hingerty
17	18 December 1897	Aston Villa	H	0–0	11,000	
18	25 December 1897	The Wednesday	A	0–4	6,000	
19	27 December 1897	Bury	H	3–1	15,000	J Hill, Maxwell, Murphy
20	1 January 1898	Bury	A	3–3	7,000	Mellor, Hingerty, Pray (o.g.)
21	8 January 1898	Sunderland	H	0–1	10,000	
22	15 January 1898	Bolton Wanderers	H	2–0	4,000	J Hill, Johnson
23	17 January 1898	Everton	A	1–1	4,000	Maxwell
24	5 February 1898	Wolverhampton Wanderers	A	2–4	7,000	Maxwell, J Hill
25	19 February 1898	Nottingham Forest	A	1–3	8,000	Maxwell
26	5 March 1898	Preston North End	A	0–0	6,000	
27	26 March 1898	The Wednesday	H	2–1	4,000	Schofield (2)
28	2 April 1898	Aston Villa	A	1–1	10,000	Molyneux
29	8 April 1898	Blackburn Rovers	A	1–1	6,000	Schofield
30	9 April 1898	Everton	H	2–0	6,000	Molyneux, Maxwell

=== Test matches ===
Date	Opponent	Venue	Result	Attendance	Scorers
20 April 1898	Newcastle United	A	1–2	5,000	Kennedy
23 April 1898	Newcastle United	H	1–0	14,000	Maxwell
26 April 1898	Burnley	A	2–0	3,000	Schofield, Raisbeck
30 April 1898	Burnley	H	0–0	15,000	

Pos.	Team	Pld.	W	D	L	F	A	GD	Pts.
1	Stoke	4	2	1	1	4	2	+2	5
2	Burnley	4	2	1	1	5	3	+2	5
3	Newcastle United	4	2	0	2	9	6	+3	4
4	Blackburn Rovers	4	1	0	3	5	12	–7	2

=== FA Cup ===
Round	Date	Opponent	Venue	Result	Attendance	Scorers
R1	29 January 1898	Bury	A	2–1	3,000	J Hill, Mellor
R2	12 February 1898	Everton	H	0–0	25,000	
R2 Replay	17 February 1898	Everton	A	1–5	10,000	J Hill

== Squad statistics ==
Pos.	Name	League		FA Cup		Test Matches		Total	
Pos.	Name	Apps	Goals	Apps	Goals	Apps	Goals	Apps	Goals
GK	Zeke Johnston	22	0	3	0	0	0	25	0
GK	(England) Fred Sheldon	3	0	0	0	0	0	3	0
GK	(England) Tom Wilkes	5	0	0	0	4	0	9	0
FB	(England) Peter Durber	10	0	1	0	0	0	11	0
FB	(England) Jack Eccles	27	0	3	0	4	0	34	0
FB	(Scotland) Tom Robertson	23	0	2	0	2	0	27	0
HB	(Scotland) Jimmy Grewer	9	0	0	0	0	0	9	0
HB	(Scotland) Jimmy McGeachan	4	0	2	0	0	0	6	0
HB	(England) Joe Murphy	30	1	3	0	4	0	37	1
HB	(England) Edward Parsons	6	0	1	0	0	0	7	0
HB	Jack Ponsonby	5	0	0	0	0	0	5	0
HB	(Scotland) Alex Raisbeck	4	0	0	0	4	1	8	1
HB	(England) Arthur Rowley	18	0	1	0	2	0	21	0
HB	(England) Alf Wood	19	2	2	0	4	0	25	2
FW	(Scotland) Jimmy Hill	21	5	3	2	0	0	24	7
FW	(England) Tom Hill	5	2	0	0	0	0	5	2
FW	(England) Jim Hingerty	10	2	2	0	0	0	12	2
FW	(England) Freddie Johnson	12	1	0	0	4	0	16	1
FW	(Scotland) Jack Kennedy	2	0	0	0	4	1	6	1
FW	(Scotland) William Maxwell	21	11	2	0	3	1	26	12
FW	(England) Harry Mellor	20	2	3	1	3	0	26	3
FW	(England) Fred Molyneux	5	2	0	0	2	0	7	2
FW	(Wales) Harry Pugh	18	1	2	0	0	0	20	1
FW	(England) Joe Schofield	27	4	2	0	4	1	33	5
FW	(England) Jack Shaffery	4	0	1	0	0	0	5	0
FW	(Scotland) Andrew Smith	0	0	0	0	0	0	0	0
–	Own goals	–	2	–	0	–	0	–	2
