= Jack Ponsonby =

Irish footballer

Personal information
- Full name: John Ponsonby
- Date of birth: 1874
- Place of birth: Dumbarton, Scotland
- Date of death: 1962 (aged 87–88)
- Place of death: Belfast, Northern Ireland
- Positions: Defender; half-back

Senior career*
Years	Team	Apps	(Gls)
1893–1897	Distillery		
1897–1898	Stoke	5	(0)
1898–1903	Distillery		

International career
1895–1900	Irish League XI	7	(0)
1895–1899	Ireland	9	(0)
- * Club domestic league appearances and goals

John Ponsonby (1874 – 1962) was a footballer who played in the Football League for Stoke.

== Career ==
Ponsonby was born in Dumbarton, Scotland to Irish parents and moved over to Belfast where he played for Distillery. He joined Stoke in 1897 and played five matches during the 1897–98 season before returning to Distillery. He won the Irish League four times (1895–96, 1898–99, 1900–01, 1902–03) across his two spells, and lifted the Irish Cup in 1896.

== Career statistics ==
=== Club ===
Appearances and goals by club, season and competition
Club	Season	League			FA Cup		Total	
Club	Season	Division	Apps	Goals	Apps	Goals	Apps	Goals
Stoke	1897–98	First Division	5	0	0	0	5	0
Career total			5	0	0	0	5	0

=== International ===
National team	Year	Apps	Goals
Ireland	1895	2	0
Ireland	1896	3	0
Ireland	1897	3	0
Ireland	1899	1	0
Total		9	0
