= Jim Peacock (footballer) =

English footballer

Personal information
- Full name: James Peacock
- Date of birth: 1871
- Place of birth: Stoke-upon-Trent, England
- Position: Half back

Senior career*
Years	Team	Apps	(Gls)
1895	Dresden United		
1896	Stoke	1	(0)
1897	Saltgates		
- * Club domestic league appearances and goals

James Peacock (1871 – after 1896) was an English footballer who played in the Football League for Stoke.

== Career ==
Peacock was born in Stoke-upon-Trent and played for Dresden United before joining Stoke in 1896. He played one match in the Football League which came in a 2–1 victory over Wolverhampton Wanderers during the 1896–97 season. He was released soon after and joined Saltgates.

== Career statistics ==
Appearances and goals by club, season and competition
Club	Season	League			FA Cup		Total	
Club	Season	Division	Apps	Goals	Apps	Goals	Apps	Goals
Stoke	1896–97	First Division	1	0	0	0	1	0
Career total			1	0	0	0	1	0
