= Samuel Woods (footballer) =

Scottish footballer

Personal information
- Full name: Samuel Woods
- Date of birth: 1871
- Place of birth: Glasgow, Scotland
- Position: Forward

Senior career*
Years	Team	Apps	(Gls)
1895	Morton		
1896	Stoke	1	(0)
1897	Morton		
- * Club domestic league appearances and goals

Samuel Woods (1871 – unknown) was a Scottish footballer who played in the Football League for Stoke.

== Career ==
Woods was born in Glasgow and played for local side Morton before he moved south to England with Stoke. He made one appearance which came in a 4–0 defeat at Bolton Wanderers in October 1896. Afterwards he returned to Greenock Morton.

== Career statistics ==
Club	Season	League			FA Cup		Total	
Club	Season	Division	Apps	Goals	Apps	Goals	Apps	Goals
Stoke	1896–97	First Division	1	0	0	0	1	0
Career Total			1	0	0	0	1	0
