= Lakeman =

Lakeman is a surname. Notable people with the surname include:

- Al Lakeman (1918–1976), catcher in Major League Baseball
- Enid Lakeman, OBE (1903–1995), British political reformer, writer and politician
- Jan Lakeman, mid 20th century Labour rights activist and former leader of the provincial Communist Party in Alberta, Canada
- Sam Lakeman (born 1975), English musician, songwriter, and producer and co-owner of Charcoal Records
- Sean Lakeman (born 1974), English folk musician and producer
- Seth Lakeman (born 1977), English folk singer, songwriter, and multi-instrumentalist
- Stephen Bartlett Lakeman (1823–1897), English-born British and Ottoman adventurer, soldier, and administrator
- The Lakeman Brothers, folk music trio from England, consisting of Sean Lakeman, Sam Lakeman and Seth Lakeman
- Thomas Lakeman (born 1964), the author of three mystery novels published by St. Martin's Minotaur

== See also ==
- Heard-Lakeman House, built in 1776, is a historic house at 2 Turkey Shore Road in Ipswich, Massachusetts
