= Thomas Robertson (footballer, born 1877) =

Scottish footballer (1877–1923)

Tom Robertson
Personal information
- Full name: John Thomas Robertson
- Date of birth: 6 June 1877
- Place of birth: Lesmahagow, Lanarkshire, Scotland
- Date of death: 8 December 1923 (aged 46)
- Place of death: Worthing, Sussex, England
- Height: 5 ft 8 in (1.73 m)
- Position: Full-back

Youth career
- Newton Thistle
- St Bernard's

Senior career*
Years	Team	Apps	(Gls)
1894–1895	Stoke	26	(1)
1895–1897	Hibernian	38	(0)
1897	Millwall Athletic		
1897–1900	Stoke	88	(2)
1900–1902	Liverpool	42	(0)
1902–1904	Southampton	45	(1)
1904–1905	Brighton & Hove Albion	26	(1)
Total		265	(5)
- * Club domestic league appearances and goals

John Thomas Robertson (6 June 1877 – 8 December 1923) (usually referred to as Tom and sometimes as Jack) was a Scottish footballer who played at full-back around the turn of the 20th century for various clubs in England, including Stoke, Liverpool (where he was a member of the side which won the Football League championship in 1900–01) and Southampton (where he won the Southern League title in 1902–03 and 1903–04).

== Football career ==
=== Stoke ===
Robertson was born in Lesmahagow, Lanarkshire, Scotland, before moving 25 miles north-west to Newton Mearns, near Glasgow. After playing as an amateur for his local village team and for St Bernard's of Edinburgh, he started his professional football career with Stoke of the English Football League First Division in May 1894.

In each of his first two seasons with Stoke, when Robertson generally played as a half-back, he only managed 13 league appearances for the first-team. After spending the next two years at other clubs, firstly in Scotland with Hibernian (where he played on the losing side in the 1896 Scottish Cup Final) and then in England with Millwall Athletic of the Southern League, Robertson returned to Stoke for the start of the 1897–98 season. He now became the established right-back at the Victoria Ground, alongside Jack Eccles on the left.

At the end of Robertson's first season back at Stoke, in which he made 23 appearances, the club finished at the foot of the First Division table, having failed to win once away from home, and were required to enter the end of season play-offs, in a mini "tournament" also involving Blackburn Rovers and the top two teams in the Second Division, Burnley and Newcastle United. Stoke managed their first away victory of the season against Burnley, and finished the play-offs at the top of the table, with Burnley as runners-up. In the event, the Football League decided to expand the First Division by two clubs, and thus Blackburn and Newcastle were able to take their places in the expanded division for the following season.

Stoke's financial problems prevented the club from strengthening the side for the 1898–99 season, other than the signing of goal-keeper George Clawley, who returned from Southampton. The club fared better this season, finishing in mid-table, with Robertson only missing three matches. He also played in all six FA Cup matches, as Stoke reached the semi-finals, where they were defeated 3–1 by Derby County.

Although the FA Cup run improved Stoke's finances, they still struggled to sign or retain players, other than those with a local connection, with the only significant signing for the 1899–1900 season being goal-keeper Tom Wilkes from Aston Villa, to replace Clawley who had moved on to join Tottenham Hotspur. The season saw a further improvement in the club's performances on the pitch, finishing the season ninth in the table, with Robertson appearing in all 34 League games, scoring twice. At this point he came the closest he would get to international recognition, taking part in the Home Scots v Anglo-Scots trial match in March 1900, alongside the unrelated William Robertson and Tommy Robertson.

At the end of the season, Robertson was signed by fellow First Division side Liverpool. In his five seasons spent at Stoke, Robertson made a total of 128 appearances for the Potteries team, scoring three goals.

=== Liverpool ===
At Liverpool, Robertson soon established a reputation as a fierce competitor who "added considerable muscle to the Reds' rearguard". He made 22 consecutive appearances from the start of the 1900–01 season, before John Glover took over for the next nine matches, although Robertson was back in place for the final three fixtures of the season as Liverpool secured their first league title by two points from runners-up Sunderland.

In the following season, it was Glover who started as the club's right-back but Robertson came back into contention during the second half of the season and made a further 17 First Division appearances, as Liverpool finished in the lower half of the table.

In February 1902, Robertson was a member of the Liverpool side who were surprisingly beaten 4–1 at Anfield by Southampton of the Southern League on their way to the Cup Final.

=== Southampton ===
In May 1902, Robertson joined Southampton of the Southern League, much against the wishes of the Liverpool management who were reluctant to release him. He made his debut for Southampton at right-back in the opening match of the 1902–03 season, a 6–0 victory over Brentford, with England international George Molyneux on his left. On the pitch, Robertson soon established himself as "a reliable full-back" who "possessed a powerful kick and the ability to time his tackles to perfection", although off the pitch he was known as a "retiring fellow" who had a "holy horror" of being interviewed and was elusive when a reporter wanted a story. He made 25 appearances in his first season at The Dell at the end of which the club claimed the Southern League title for the fifth time in seven years.

Robertson met with a severe injury in the opening match of the 1903–04 season which put him out of the game until late November, during which period Samuel Meston took over from him. Robertson returned on 21 November 1903 and remained in the side for the rest of the season, although he struggled to recapture his old form. At the end of the season, the Saints claimed the Southern League title for the sixth (and final) time.

=== Brighton ===
In the summer of 1904, Robertson moved along the south coast to join Brighton & Hove Albion, where he played out his final season before retiring.

Following his retirement, Robertson became a publican in Hove.

== Career statistics ==
Club	Season	League			FA Cup		Test Match		Total	
Club	Season	Division	Apps	Goals	Apps	Goals	Apps	Goals	Apps	Goals
Stoke	1894–95	First Division	13	1	0	0	—		13	1
Stoke	1895–96	First Division	13	0	2	0	—		15	0
Stoke	Total		26	1	2	0	—		28	1
Hibernian	1894–95	Scottish Division Two	4	0	2	0	—		6	0
Hibernian	1895–96	Scottish Division One	16	0	5	0	—		21	0
Hibernian	1896–97	Scottish Division One	18	0	2	0	—		20	0
Hibernian	Total		38	0	9	0	—		47	0
Stoke	1897–98	First Division	23	0	2	0	2	0	27	0
Stoke	1898–99	First Division	31	0	6	0	—		37	0
Stoke	1899–1900	First Division	34	2	2	0	—		36	2
Stoke	Total		88	2	10	0	2	0	100	2
Liverpool	1900–01	First Division	25	0	2	0	—		27	0
Liverpool	1901–02	First Division	17	0	3	0	—		20	0
Liverpool	Total		42	0	5	0	—		47	0
Southampton	1902–03	Southern League	26	1	3	0	—		29	1
Southampton	1903–04	Southern League	19	0	2	0	—		21	0
Southampton	Total		45	1	5	0	—		50	1
Career Total			239	4	31	0	2	0	272	4

== Honours ==
Liverpool

- The Football League champions: 1900–01

Southampton

- Southern League champions: 1902–03 and 1903–04

== Bibliography ==
- Gibbons, Philip (2001). Association Football in Victorian England – A History of the Game from 1863 to 1900. Upfront Publishing. ISBN 978-1-84426-035-5.
- Holley, Duncan; Chalk, Gary (1992). The Alphabet of the Saints. ACL & Polar Publishing. ISBN 978-0-9514862-3-8.
- Chalk, Gary; Holley, Duncan (1987). Saints – A complete record. Breedon Books. ISBN 978-0-907969-22-8.
- Chalk, Gary; Holley, Duncan; Bull, David (2013). All the Saints: A Complete Players' Who's Who of Southampton FC. Hagiology Publishing. ISBN 978-0-9926864-0-6.
