= Teddy Sandland =

English footballer (1873–1939)

Personal information
- Full name: Edwin Thomas Sandland
- Date of birth: 1873
- Place of birth: Stoke-upon-Trent, England
- Date of death: 1928 (aged 54–55)
- Position: Inside left

Senior career*
Years	Team	Apps	(Gls)
1893	Newcastle Swifts		
1894–1895	Stoke	13	(3)
1895	Congleton Hornets		
- * Club domestic league appearances and goals

Edwin Thomas Sandland (1873 – 1939) was an English footballer who played in the Football League for Stoke.

== Career ==
Sandland was born in Stoke-upon-Trent and started his career with local amateur side Newcastle Swifts before earning a move to Stoke in 1894. He played in twelve matches during 1894–95 scoring twice in a 3–1 victory over Liverpool in November 1894. He played just once in 1895–96 and scored against Everton before returning to amateur football with Congleton Hornets.

== Career statistics ==
Club	Season	League			FA Cup		Total	
Club	Season	Division	Apps	Goals	Apps	Goals	Apps	Goals
Stoke	1894–95	First Division	12	2	0	0	12	2
Stoke	1895–96	First Division	1	1	0	0	1	1
Career Total			13	3	0	0	13	3
