= Harry Pugh =

Welsh footballer

Personal information
- Full name: Henry David Pugh
- Date of birth: 8 March 1875
- Place of birth: Wrexham, Wales
- Date of death: 1945 (aged 70)
- Position: Outside right

Senior career*
Years	Team	Apps	(Gls)
1894	Wrexham Grosvenor		
1895–1897	Wrexham		
1897–1898	Stoke	18	(1)
1898–1901	Lincoln City	91	(11)
Total		109	(12)

International career
1896–1901	Wales	7	(2)
- * Club domestic league appearances and goals

David Henry "Harry" Pugh (8 March 1875 – 1945) was a Welsh footballer who played in the English Football League for Lincoln City and Stoke. He was also capped seven times to the Wales national team between 1896 and 1901, and scored two goals for the team.

== Career ==
Pugh was born in Wrexham and played for local clubs Wrexham Grosvenor and Wrexham. He joined Stoke in 1897 and played 20 matches for the club scoring once. He left for Lincoln City in March 1898 and he became a regular for the "Imps" in the Second Division playing 97 matches for the club scoring 12 goals in four years.

Pugh made seven appearances for Wales and scored two goals. He played his first match on 29 February 1896 against Ireland and his last match on 18 March 1901 against England.

== Career statistics ==
=== Club ===
Appearances and goals by club, season and competition
Club	Season	League			FA Cup		Total	
Club	Season	Division	Apps	Goals	Apps	Goals	Apps	Goals
Stoke	1897–98	First Division	18	1	2	0	20	1
Lincoln City	1897–98	Second Division	4	1	0	0	4	1
Lincoln City	1898–99	Second Division	33	2	2	1	35	3
Lincoln City	1899–1900	Second Division	27	6	1	0	28	6
Lincoln City	1900–01	Second Division	27	2	4	0	31	2
Lincoln City	1901–02	Second Division	0	0	1	0	1	0
Lincoln City	Total		91	11	6	1	97	12
Career Total			109	12	10	1	119	13

=== International ===
National team	Year	Apps	Goals
Wales	1896	2	1
Wales	1897	2	1
Wales	1900	1	0
Wales	1901	2	0
Total		7	2
