= Jamie Jones =

Jamie Jones may refer to:

- Jamie Jones (DJ), Welsh DJ, producer and two-time DJ Awards winner
- Jamie Jones (footballer) (born 1989), English professional footballer for Wigan Athletic
- Jamie Jones (snooker player) (born 1988), Welsh professional snooker player from Neath
- Jamie Leigh Jones (born 1985), former employee of KBR
- Jamie Jones, member of the American male R&B and pop group All-4-One

== See also ==
- James Jones (disambiguation)
- Jamie Jones-Buchanan (born 1981), English coach and former professional rugby league footballer
