= 1898–99 Stoke F.C. season =

Stoke
1898–99 season
- Chairman: Mr J Fenton
- Manager: Horace Austerberry
- Stadium: Victoria Ground
- Football League First Division: 12th (33 Points)
- FA Cup: Semi-final
- Top goalscorer: League: William Maxwell (16); All: William Maxwell (19)
- Highest home attendance: 14,000 vs Aston Villa (1 September 1898)
- Lowest home attendance: 3,000 vs Bury (22 April 1899)
- Average home league attendance: 7,600
Home colours

The 1898–99 season was Stoke's tenth season in the Football League.

With automatic promotion and relegation now introduced thanks to Stoke and Burnley's antics last season, Stoke improved marginally as they took 12th place with 33 points. Stoke form was erratic throughout the season and with neither any hopes of mounting a title challenge or any relegation fears Stoke went on to enjoy their best performance so far in the FA Cup. They reached the semi-final of the competition for the first time losing 3–1 to eventual runners-up Derby County.

== Season review ==
=== League ===
The 1898–99 season saw the introduction of automatic promotion and relegation between the First and Second Divisions of the Football League, and Stoke's fortunes improved marginally as they finished in 12th position. The season hardly started well when three players were suspended for a breach of club rules during pre-season training for drinking champagne. In August 1898 club secretary, former manager and goalkeeper Bill Rowley transferred himself to Leicester Fosse and even agreed his own signing on fee. This transaction caused uproar by the FA who suspended Rowley.

Stoke's form-rate in 1898–99 was erratic with only three wins coming in their opening 12 matches, five in the middle 12 and five in the last 10. The highlight was undoubtedly a convincing 3–0 victory over champions-to-be Aston Villa on New Year's Eve, while Burnley and Sheffield United were both beaten 4–1. At the end of the season club legend Joe Schofield decided to retire from playing after spending eight years with Stoke.

=== FA Cup ===
Stoke reached the semi-finals of the competition for the first time after seeing off Sheffield Wednesday, Small Heath and Tottenham Hotspur. They succumbed to a 3–1 defeat to Derby County at neutral Molineux with Steve Bloomer scoring a fine hat-trick for the "Rams".

The Evening Sentinel commented: "Derby had their halves to thank for victory, Stoke were decidedly the better side in the first half and it was Derby's luck to get on level terms by means of a scrimmage which was produced by full-back Tom Robertson's miss kick. Stoke did most of the attacking again in the second half until Derby got the lead in an unexpected manner. Of course this put new life into Derby and very little seemed to go wrong with them afterwards although Stoke played up strongly. The weakness in their attack was the centre-forward Fred Molyneux. The Derby players were very vigorous and did not spare the Stoke team in bumping them about. Derby scored a third goal to put the contest beyond the brave Stoke players much to the disappointment of the Stoke spectators."

The Stoke players received a £5 bonus for their cup exploits and it would be another 72 years before the club reached the semi-final stage again.

== Final league table ==
Pos	Team	Pld	W	D	L	GF	GA	GAv	Pts
10	Bury	34	14	7	13	48	49	0.980	35
11	Nottingham Forest	34	11	11	12	42	42	1.000	33
12	Stoke	34	13	7	14	47	52	0.904	33
13	Newcastle United	34	11	8	15	49	48	1.021	30
14	West Bromwich Albion	34	12	6	16	42	57	0.737	30

Source: World Football
Rules for classification: 1) Points; 2) Goal average; 3) Goals scored

== Results ==
Stoke's score comes first

=== Legend ===
Win	Draw	Loss

=== Football League First Division ===
Match	Date	Opponent	Venue	Result	Attendance	Scorers
1	1 September 1898	Derby County	H	0–0	14,000	
2	3 September 1898	Aston Villa	A	1–3	30,000	Farrell
3	10 September 1898	Burnley	H	4–1	7,000	Farrell, Mellor, Schofield, Kennedy
4	17 September 1898	Sheffield United	A	1–1	8,000	Maxwell
5	24 September 1898	Newcastle United	H	0–0	7,500	
6	1 October 1898	Preston North End	A	2–4	6,000	Maxwell (2)
7	8 October 1898	Liverpool	H	2–1	12,000	Murphy, Turner
8	15 October 1898	Nottingham Forest	A	1–2	5,000	Farrell
9	22 October 1898	Bolton Wanderers	H	2–3	5,000	Maxwell (2)
10	29 October 1898	Derby County	A	1–1	8,000	Maxwell
11	5 November 1898	West Bromwich Albion	H	2–1	7,750	Maxwell, Kennedy
12	12 November 1898	Blackburn Rovers	A	1–4	7,000	Turner
13	14 November 1898	Preston North End	H	2–1	6,500	Turner, Schofield
14	19 November 1898	The Wednesday	H	1–0	6,000	Schofield
15	26 November 1898	Sunderland	A	0–2	5,000	
16	3 December 1898	Wolverhampton Wanderers	H	2–4	7,000	Schofield, Johnson
17	10 December 1898	Everton	A	0–2	10,000	
18	17 December 1898	Notts County	H	1–1	5,000	Maxwell
19	24 December 1898	Bury	A	2–5	8,000	Schofield, Molyneux
20	26 December 1898	Nottingham Forest	H	2–1	10,000	Maxwell, Kennedy
21	31 December 1898	Aston Villa	H	3–0	10,000	Maxwell, Kennedy, Turner
22	14 January 1899	Sheffield United	H	4–1	9,000	Maxwell (2), Schofield (2)
23	21 January 1899	Newcastle United	A	0–3	4,000	
24	4 February 1899	Liverpool	A	0–1	8,000	
25	18 February 1899	Bolton Wanderers	A	2–0	4,000	Turner (2)
26	4 March 1899	West Bromwich Albion	A	1–0	1,714	Kennedy
27	11 March 1899	Blackburn Rovers	H	0–1	6,000	
28	25 March 1899	Sunderland	H	1–0	4,000	Maxwell
29	27 March 1899	The Wednesday	A	3–1	12,000	Turner, Farrell, Johnson
30	1 April 1899	Wolverhampton Wanderers	A	2–3	2,000	Maxwell, Schofield
31	8 April 1899	Everton	H	2–1	3,000	Johnson, Tooth
32	15 April 1899	Notts County	A	0–2	5,000	
33	17 April 1899	Burnley	A	1–1	4,000	Maxwell
34	22 April 1899	Bury	H	1–1	3,000	Maxwell

=== FA Cup ===
Round	Date	Opponent	Venue	Result	Attendance	Scorers
R1	28 January 1899	The Wednesday	A	2–2	16,000	Farrell, Kennedy
R1 Replay	2 February 1899	The Wednesday	H	2–0	15,000	Maxwell, Schofield
R2	11 February 1899	Small Heath	H	2–2	12,000	Maxwell, Schofield
R2 Replay	15 February 1899	Small Heath	A	2–1	15,000	Kennedy, Molyneux
R3	25 February 1899	Tottenham Hotspur	H	4–1	22,000	Kennedy, Molyneux, Schofield, Johnson
Semi-final	18 March 1899	Derby County	N	1–3	29,000	Maxwell

== Squad statistics ==
Pos.	Name	League		FA Cup		Total	
Pos.	Name	Apps	Goals	Apps	Goals	Apps	Goals
GK	(England) George Clawley	34	0	6	0	40	0
FB	(England) Jack Eccles	21	0	6	0	27	0
FB	(Scotland) Tom Robertson	31	0	6	0	37	0
FB	(England) Arthur Rowley	14	0	0	0	14	0
HB	(England) James Bradley	26	0	6	0	32	0
HB	(England) Jack Deakin	2	0	0	0	2	0
HB	(England) Tom Holford	5	0	0	0	5	0
HB	(England) Joe Murphy	19	1	0	0	19	1
HB	(England) Edward Parsons	13	0	6	0	19	0
HB	(England) Alf Wood	27	0	6	0	33	0
FW	(England) Ephraim Colclough	2	0	0	0	2	0
FW	(England) Jack Farrell	22	4	3	1	25	5
FW	(England) Len Hales	1	0	0	0	1	0
FW	(Scotland) Tommy Hyslop	12	0	0	0	12	0
FW	(Scotland) Jack Kennedy	27	5	6	3	33	8
FW	(England) Freddie Johnson	26	3	6	1	32	4
FW	(Scotland) William Maxwell	31	16	6	3	37	19
FW	(England) Harry Mellor	6	1	0	0	6	1
FW	(England) Fred Molyneux	6	1	3	2	9	3
FW	(England) Joe Schofield	14	8	5	3	19	11
FW	(England) George Tooth	1	1	0	0	1	1
FW	(England) Jimmy Turner	7	0	0	0	7	0
FW	(England) Joe Turner	27	7	1	0	28	7
