= Billy Baird (footballer) =

Scottish footballer

Personal information
- Full name: William Baird
- Date of birth: 1876
- Place of birth: Glasgow, Scotland
- Position: Forward

Senior career*
| Years | Team | Apps | (Gls) |
| 1895 | Morton | | |
| 1896–1897 | Stoke | 3 | (0) |
- * Club domestic league appearances and goals

William Baird (1876 – unknown) was a Scottish footballer who played in the Football League for Stoke.

== Career ==
Baird was born in Glasgow and played for Morton before earning a move to English side Stoke in 1896. He played three matches for Stoke during the 1896–97 season all of which came during the first month of the season. He soon left the club however presumably to return to Scotland.

== Career statistics ==
| Club | Season | League | | | FA Cup | | Total | |
| Club | Season | Division | Apps | Goals | Apps | Goals | Apps | Goals |
|---|---|---|---|---|---|---|---|---|
| Stoke | 1896–97 | First Division | 3 | 0 | 0 | 0 | 3 | 0 |
| Career Total | | | 3 | 0 | 0 | 0 | 3 | 0 |
