= Jack Deakin (footballer, born 1873) =

English footballer

Personal information
- Full name: Jack Deakin
- Date of birth: 1873
- Place of birth: Stoke-upon-Trent, England
- Position: Centre-half

Senior career*
Years	Team	Apps	(Gls)
1897	Dresden United		
1898–1899	Stoke	2	(0)
1899	Hanley Swifts		
- * Club domestic league appearances and goals

Jack Deakin (1873 – after 1899) was an English footballer who played in the Football League for Stoke.

== Career ==
Deakin was born in Stoke-upon-Trent and played with Dresden United before joining Stoke in 1898. He played twice for Stoke in the 1898–99 season both coming towards the end of the season against Notts County and Bury. He left at the end of the season to play for Hanley Swifts.

== Career statistics ==
Appearances and goals by club, season and competition
Club	Season	League			FA Cup		Total	
Club	Season	Division	Apps	Goals	Apps	Goals	Apps	Goals
Stoke	1898–99	First Division	2	0	0	0	2	0
Career total			2	0	0	0	2	0
