= Bill Fearns =

Scottish footballer

Personal information
- Full name: William Fearns
- Date of birth: 1 January 1867
- Place of birth: Glasgow, Scotland
- Date of death: 1922 (aged 55)
- Position: Defender

Senior career*
Years	Team	Apps	(Gls)
1895	Corinthian		
1896–1897	Stoke	4	(0)
1897	Corinthian		
- * Club domestic league appearances and goals

William Fearns (1 January 1867 – 1922) was a Scottish footballer who played in the Football League for Stoke.

== Career ==
Fearns was born in Glasgow and played for the famous London amateur club, Corinthian. In 1896–97 He joined Stoke and played four matches for the "Potters" before returning to Corinthian.

== Career statistics ==
Club	Season	League			FA Cup		Total	
Club	Season	Division	Apps	Goals	Apps	Goals	Apps	Goals
Stoke	1896–97	First Division	4	0	0	0	4	0
Career Total			4	0	0	0	4	0
