= Edward Proctor =

English footballer

Personal information
- Full name: Edward Proctor
- Date of birth: 1870
- Place of birth: Barlaston, England
- Date of death: 1944 (aged 74)
- Position: Inside right

Youth career
- Leek
- Royal Dublin Fusiliers

Senior career*
Years	Team	Apps	(Gls)
1895–1896	Stoke	3	(2)
1896–1897	Burslem Port Vale	13	(3)
Total		16	(5)
- * Club domestic league appearances and goals

Edward Proctor (1870–1944) was an English footballer who played in the Football League for Stoke.

== Career ==
Proctor played for Leek and Royal Dublin Fusiliers before joining league club Stoke in 1895. He played three times for Stoke in 1895–96 scoring twice against The Wednesday and Preston North End. He then moved onto Midland Football League club and nearby rivals Burslem Port Vale in October 1896. He scored on his debut, in a 1–1 draw with Dresden United at the Athletic Ground in a Staffordshire Senior Cup preliminary round match on 10 October 1896. He was a first-team regular until he lost his place in January 1897 and was most likely released at the end of the season.

== Career statistics ==
Appearances and goals by club, season and competition
Club	Season	League			FA Cup		Staffordshire Cup		Total	
Club	Season	Division	Apps	Goals	Apps	Goals	Apps	Goals	Apps	Goals
Stoke	1895–96	First Division	3	2	0	0	0	0	3	2
Burslem Port Vale	1896–97	Midland League	13	3	2	0	2	1	17	4
Career total			16	5	2	0	2	1	20	6
