= Ephraim Colclough =

English footballer

Personal information
- Full name: Ephraim Colclough
- Date of birth: 1 December 1875
- Place of birth: Longton, Staffordshire, England
- Date of death: 2 January 1914 (aged 38)
- Place of death: Longton, England
- Position: Forward

Senior career*
Years	Team	Apps	(Gls)
1898–1899	Stoke	3	(0)
1900–1901	Watford	17	(1)
1901–1902	Brighton & Hove Albion	3	(1)
- * Club domestic league appearances and goals

Ephraim Colclough (1 December 1875 – 2 January 1914) was an English footballer who played for Brighton & Hove Albion, Stoke and Watford.

== Career ==
Colclough was born in Longton, Staffordshire, and joined local side Stoke in 1898. He played three matches for Stoke in two years and joined Southern League side Watford in 1900. He spent the 1900–01 season with Watford playing 17 matches scoring once. He then spent less than a season with Brighton & Hove Albion before his death in Longton in 1914.

== Career statistics ==
Appearances and goals by club, season and competition
Club	Season	League			FA Cup		Total	
Club	Season	Division	Apps	Goals	Apps	Goals	Apps	Goals
Stoke	1898–99	First Division	2	0	0	0	2	0
Stoke	1899–1900	First Division	1	0	0	0	1	0
Watford	1900–01	Southern League	17	1	0	0	17	1
Brighton & Hove Albion	1901–02	Southern League Div. Two	3	1	4	2	7	3
Career total			23	2	4	2	27	4
