= Fred Latham =

English footballer

Personal information
- Full name: Fredrick Latham
- Date of birth: July 1876
- Place of birth: Crewe, England
- Date of death: 17 January 1933 (aged 56)
- Place of death: Chester
- Position: Goalkeeper

Senior career*
Years	Team	Apps	(Gls)
1894–1896	Crewe Alexandra	18	(0)
1896–1897	Stoke	5	(0)
1897–1900	Crewe Alexandra		
1900	Bristol Rovers		
- * Club domestic league appearances and goals

Fredrick Latham (born 1876) was an English footballer who played in the Football League for Crewe Alexandra and Stoke.

== Career ==
Latham was born in Crewe and began his career with local side Crewe Alexandra. He spent two years with the "Alex" making 21 appearances before joining Stoke in August 1896. Stoke were at the time experiencing an goalkeeping injury crisis and Latham was recruited to fill a temporary gap. He played in all of Stoke's five matches in September 1896 before returning to Crewe.

Affectionately known as the 'human octopus', he also kept goal for Stafford Rangers, Darlaston, Brierley Hill and Stalybridge Rovers where he had the misfortune to fracture his jaw. Became a referee after hanging up his gloves.

== Career statistics ==
Club	Season	League			FA Cup		Total	
Club	Season	Division	Apps	Goals	Apps	Goals	Apps	Goals
Crewe Alexandra	1894–95	Second Division	1	0	0	0	1	0
Crewe Alexandra	1895–96	Second Division	17	0	3	0	20	0
Stoke	1896–97	First Division	5	0	0	0	5	0
Career Total			23	0	3	0	26	0
