= Jim Hingerty =

English footballer

Personal information
- Full name: James Hingerty
- Date of birth: q3 1875
- Place of birth: Walsall, England
- Date of death: 1909
- Position: Centre forward

Senior career*
Years	Team	Apps	(Gls)
1895	North Staffordshire Regiment		
1896–1897	Stoke	20	(6)
1898	Rushden		
- * Club domestic league appearances and goals

James Hingerty (q3 1875 – 1909) was an English footballer who played in the Football League for Stoke.

== Career ==
Hingerty was born in Walsall and joined the Army as a teenager where he played football with the North Staffordshire Regiment. He left the army in 1896 and joined Stoke where he scored six goals in twelve matches during the 1896–97 season and he played the same number of matches in the following season scoring twice. In 1897 he left Stoke and joined Rushden Town.

== Career statistics ==
Appearances and goals by club, season and competition
Club	Season	League			FA Cup		Total	
Club	Season	Division	Apps	Goals	Apps	Goals	Apps	Goals
Stoke	1896–97	First Division	10	4	2	2	12	6
Stoke	1897–98	First Division	10	2	2	0	12	2
Career total			20	6	4	2	24	8
