= Arthur Bentley (footballer) =

English footballer

Personal information
- Full name: Arthur Bentley
- Date of birth: 1871
- Place of birth: Stoke-upon-Trent, England
- Position: Inside right

Senior career*
Years	Team	Apps	(Gls)
1895	Sandbach Ramblers		
1896–1897	Stoke	5	(0)
1897	Sandbach Ramblers		
- * Club domestic league appearances and goals

Arthur Bentley (1871 – after 1897) was an English footballer who played in the Football League for Stoke.

== Career ==
Bentley was born in Stoke-upon-Trent and played for Sandbach Ramblers before joining Stoke in 1896. He played in five matches during the 1896–97 season. He was released and the end of the season and re-joined Sandbach Ramblers.

== Career statistics ==
Club	Season	League			FA Cup		Total	
Club	Season	Division	Apps	Goals	Apps	Goals	Apps	Goals
Stoke	1896–97	First Division	5	0	0	0	5	0
Career total			5	0	0	0	5	0
