= Ezekiel Johnston =

Irish footballer

Personal information
- Full name: Ezekiel Johnston
- Date of birth: 1871
- Place of birth: Belfast, Ireland
- Date of death: 1942 (aged 71)
- Position: Goalkeeper

Senior career*
Years	Team	Apps	(Gls)
1893	Glentoran		
1893–1895	Burnley	9	(0)
1895	Glentoran		
1895–1896	Belfast Celtic		
1896–1898	Stoke	38	(0)
1898	Belfast Celtic		
Total		47	(0)
- * Club domestic league appearances and goals

Ezekiel Johnston (1871 – 1942) was an Irish footballer who played in the Football League for Burnley and Stoke.

== Career ==
Johnston was born in Belfast and played for Glentoran before joining English league side Burnley in 1893. He spent two seasons at Turf Moor failing to displace Jack Hillman as first choice 'keeper and returned to Irish football with Belfast Celtic. However, he was given a chance again in English football with Stoke in 1896. He played 16 times in 1896–97 and 25 times in 1897–98 and was released once Stoke re-signed George Clawley. In October 1902 he saved three men from drowning at sea after diving in and pulling them to safety.

== Career statistics ==
Club	Season	League			FA Cup		Total	
Club	Season	Division	Apps	Goals	Apps	Goals	Apps	Goals
Burnley	1893–94	First Division	1	0	0	0	1	0
Burnley	1894–95	First Division	8	0	1	0	9	0
Burnley	Total		9	0	1	0	10	0
Stoke	1896–97	First Division	16	0	2	0	18	0
Stoke	1897–98	First Division	22	0	3	0	25	0
Stoke	Total		38	0	5	0	43	0
Career total			47	0	6	0	53	0
