= Jack Kennedy (footballer, born 1873) =

Scottish footballer (1873–>1902)

Personal information
- Full name: John Kennedy
- Date of birth: 1873
- Place of birth: Edinburgh, Scotland
- Position: Inside right

Senior career*
| Years | Team | Apps | (Gls) |
| 1893–1898 | Hibernian | 82 | (37) |
| 1898–1899 | Stoke | 58 | (8) |
| 1900–1902 | Glossop | 34 | (6) |
| Total | | 174 | (51) |

International career
| 1897 | Scotland | 1 | (0) |
| 1897 | Scottish League XI | 1 | (0) |
- * Club domestic league appearances and goals

John Kennedy (1873 — after 1902) was a Scottish footballer, who played for Glossop, Hibernian and Stoke. He earned one full international cap for the Scotland national team.

== Career ==
A native of Shotts, Kennedy played at inside-right and began his career with Hibernian, one of the city's two principal clubs. He played for Hibs in the 1896 Scottish Cup Final, a 3–1 defeat by Edinburgh derby rivals Hearts. Kennedy represented Scotland once, in a 1897 British Home Championship match against Wales.

In April 1898 Kennedy moved to English side Stoke who at the time were struggling at the foot of the table. They entered the end of season test matches with Kennedy scoring in the first match against Newcastle United. He also played in the final match against Burnley, both teams went into the match knowing that a draw would see them remain in the First Division and throughout the 90 minutes not a single attempt on goal was made, this led to the introduction of automatic promotion and relegation. Kennedy experienced a far more successful 1898–99 season as Stoke reached the FA Cup semi final for the first time losing 3–1 to Derby County. He remained at Stoke for one more season before joining Glossop in 1900.

== Career statistics ==
=== Club ===
Appearances and goals by club, season and competition
| Club | Season | League | | | FA Cup | | Test Match | | Total | |
| Club | Season | Division | Apps | Goals | Apps | Goals | Apps | Goals | Apps | Goals |
|---|---|---|---|---|---|---|---|---|---|---|
| Hibernian | 1893–94 | Scottish Division Two | 16 | 3 | 1 | 0 | – | | 17 | 3 |
| Hibernian | 1894–95 | Scottish Division Two | 15 | 5 | 3 | 0 | – | | 18 | 5 |
| Hibernian | 1895–96 | Scottish Division One | 18 | 12 | 5 | 1 | – | | 23 | 13 |
| Hibernian | 1896–97 | Scottish Division One | 18 | 9 | 1 | 0 | – | | 19 | 9 |
| Hibernian | 1897–98 | Scottish Division One | 15 | 8 | 3 | 0 | – | | 18 | 8 |
| Hibernian | Total | | 82 | 37 | 13 | 1 | 0 | 0 | 95 | 38 |
| Stoke | 1897–98 | First Division | 2 | 0 | 0 | 0 | 4 | 1 | 6 | 1 |
| Stoke | 1898–99 | First Division | 27 | 5 | 6 | 3 | – | | 33 | 8 |
| Stoke | 1899–1900 | First Division | 29 | 3 | 2 | 0 | – | | 31 | 3 |
| Stoke | Total | | 58 | 8 | 8 | 3 | 4 | 1 | 70 | 12 |
| Glossop | 1900–01 | Second Division | 34 | 6 | 1 | 0 | – | | 35 | 6 |
| Career total | | | 174 | 51 | 22 | 4 | 4 | 1 | 200 | 56 |

=== International ===
| National team | Year | Apps | Goals |
|---|---|---|---|
| Scotland | 1897 | 1 | 0 |
| Total | | 1 | 0 |
