= James Jones (cricketer, born 1870) =

English cricketer, born 1878

Personal information
- Full name: James Lovelady Jones
- Born: 1870; Liverpool, Lancashire, England
- Died: 1960 (aged 89/90); Uxbridge, Middlesex, England
- Batting: Unknown
- Role: Wicket-keeper

Domestic team information
- Years: Team
- 1910: Lancashire
- 1909–1912: Cheshire

Career statistics
Competition	First-class
Matches	4
Runs scored	10
Batting average	10.00
100s/50s	–/–
Top score	7*
Balls bowled	–
Wickets	–
Bowling average	–
5 wickets in innings	–
10 wickets in match	–
Best bowling	–
Catches/stumpings	5/–
- Source: CricketArchive, 16 October 2018

James Lovelady Jones (1870–1960) was an English first-class cricketer.

Jones was born at Liverpool in the first quarter of 1870. He made his debut in minor counties cricket for Cheshire in the 1909 Minor Counties Championship. After one season playing minor counties cricket, Jones played first-class cricket for Lancashire in 1910, debuting against Nottinghamshire at Old Trafford. He played three further first-class matches for Lancashire in the 1910 County Championship. He returned to playing minor counties cricket for Cheshire in 1912, with Jones making a total of twelve appearances in the Minor Counties Championship. He died at Uxbridge in the fourth quarter of 1960.
