= Duncan McDonald (English footballer) =

English footballer

Personal information
- Full name: Duncan McDonald
- Position: Full back

Senior career*
Years	Team	Apps	(Gls)
1893–1895	Crewe Alexandra	2	(0)
1895–1896	Stoke	0	(0)
1896–1898	West Norwood		
1898	Redhill		
Total		2	(0)
- * Club domestic league appearances and goals

Duncan McDonald was an English footballer who played in the Football League for Crewe Alexandra.

== Career ==
McDonald started his career with Second Division side Crewe Alexandra, making his debut on 24 March 1893 in a 2–0 defeat away at Liverpool. He only managed two further appearances for the Railwaymen in 1894–95, one in the league and the other in an embarrassing 6–3 FA Cup defeat to Fairfield. McDonald left Crewe for Stoke where he spent the 1895–96 season with the reserve side playing in the Midland Football League. He left at the end of the campaign and played with London-based non-league sides West Norwood and Redhill.

== Career statistics ==
Appearances and goals by club, season and competition
Club	Season	League			FA Cup		Total	
Club	Season	Division	Apps	Goals	Apps	Goals	Apps	Goals
Crewe Alexandra	1893–94	Second Division	1	0	0	0	1	0
Crewe Alexandra	1894–95	Second Division	1	0	1	0	2	0
Crewe Alexandra	Total		2	0	1	0	3	0
Stoke	1895–96	First Division	0	0	0	0	0	0
Career total			2	0	1	0	3	0
