= Joe Eccles =

English footballer

Personal information
- Full name: Joseph Eccles
- Date of birth: February 1906
- Place of birth: Stoke-upon-Trent, England, United Kingdom
- Date of death: 1970 (aged 63–64)
- Position: Winger

Senior career*
Years	Team	Apps	(Gls)
1922	Walsall	0	(0)
1923	Wolseley Motors		
1924	Aston Villa	10	(0)
1926	West Ham United	0	(0)
1928	Northampton Town	15	(1)
1929	Coventry City	0	(0)
Total		25	(1)
- * Club domestic league appearances and goals

Joseph Eccles (February 1906 – 1970) was an English footballer who played in the Football League for Aston Villa and Northampton Town. His father Jack was also a professional footballer.
