= Jimmy Jones (Australian footballer) =

Australian rules footballer

Personal information
- Full name: Jimmy Jones
- Born: 20 April 1889
- Died: 13 June 1955 (aged 66)

Playing career^{1}
Years	Club	Games (Goals)
1911	Essendon	1 (0)
- ^{1} Playing statistics correct to the end of 1911.

Jimmy Jones (20 April 1889 – 13 June 1955) was an Australian rules footballer who played with Essendon in the Victorian Football League (VFL).
