= James Jones (cricketer, born 1885) =

English cricketer (1885–1953)

Jimmy Jones
Personal information
- Full name: James M Jones
- Born: 15 February 1885; Blackwell, Derbyshire, England
- Died: 19 December 1953 (aged 68); Bristol, England
- Batting: Left-handed
- Role: Batsman, wicketkeeper

Domestic team information
- Years: Team
- 1922–1923: Somerset
- 1928–1929: Glamorgan
- 1929: Wales
- First-class debut: 26 August 1922 Somerset v Warwickshire
- Last First-class: 12 July 1929 Wales v South Africans

Career statistics
Competition	First-class
Matches	27
Runs scored	846
Batting average	18.80
100s/50s	0/6
Top score	75
Catches/stumpings	27/13
- Source: CricketArchive, 28 February 2011

James M Jones (15 February 1885 – 19 December 1953), known as Jimmy Jones, played first-class cricket for Somerset and Glamorgan in the 1920s. He also appeared in first-class cricket matches for the Wales team.

Jones was a left-handed lower- or middle-order batsman and a wicketkeeper. He appeared for Somerset in a single match in the 1922 season, and then became a regular player as a professional for the first two-thirds of the 1923 season, though he kept wicket only when amateur players, in particular Dar Lyon were not available. In addition to occasionally keeping wicket, Jones often made useful runs. In the match against Gloucestershire at Taunton he batted at No 7 and top-scored in the first innings with 70, which was his highest score for Somerset. He batted at No 3 in other matches and from there he made 50 in the match against Worcestershire at Kidderminster.

Jones moved to Wales and played cricket for Gowerton Cricket Club while qualifying for Glamorgan. He played as a middle-order batsman and wicketkeeper in eight matches in 1928 and 1929, and against Essex at Leyton in 1928, scored 57 and 75, the second innings being the highest of his first-class career. Wisden Cricketers' Almanack in its review of Glamorgan's 1928 season expressed the view that "Jones may become the regular stumper". But early in the 1929 season Jones lost his place in the side to Trevor Every and he never regained it. He played two first-class matches for the Wales side in 1929, but then played local cricket in South Wales before becoming coach at Denstone College and later a publican in Staffordshire.
