= Arthur Phoenix =

English footballer (1902-1979)

Personal information
- Full name: Arthur Frederick Phoenix
- Date of birth: 5 March 1902^{[A]}
- Place of birth: Patricroft, Eccles, England
- Date of death: 3 April 1979 (aged 76)
- Place of death: Eccles, England
- Positions: Inside right; right half

Senior career*
| Years | Team | Apps | (Gls) |
| – | Hadfield | | |
| 1922–1923 | Glossop | | |
| 1923–1924 | Birmingham | 3 | (0) |
| 1924–1925 | Aston Villa | 3 | (2) |
| 1925–1926 | Barnsley | 4 | (0) |
| 1926–1929 | Exeter City | 52 | (9) |
| 1929–1930 | Wigan Borough | 25 | (0) |
| 1930 | Bath City | | |
| 1930–1931 | Torquay United | 18 | (0) |
| 1931–1932 | Mansfield Town | 3 | (0) |
| 1932–1933 | RC Paris | | |
| 1933–1934 | Sandbach Ramblers | | |
| 1934 | Shelbourne | | |
| 1934–1935 | Colwyn Bay United | | |
| 1935–193? | Brierley Hill Alliance | | |
| 193?–1936 | Ballymena United | | |
| 1936–1937 | Mossley | | |
- * Club domestic league appearances and goals

Arthur Frederick Phoenix (5 March 1902^{[A]} – 3 April 1979), often known as Ginger Phoenix, was an English professional footballer who played in the Football League for Birmingham, Aston Villa, Barnsley, Exeter City, Wigan Borough, Torquay United and Mansfield Town, and in Division 1 of the French League for Racing Club de Paris. He also played for clubs in Wales and Ireland.

== Playing career ==
Phoenix was born in Patricroft, Eccles, which was then in Lancashire.^{[A]} He played for Hadfield and for Glossop before joining Birmingham in May 1923. He made his debut playing at inside left in the First Division on 29 September 1923 in a goalless draw away against Arsenal, and played twice more during the 1923–24 season. At the end of the season he crossed the city to join Aston Villa, for whom he scored three goals, two from three First Division games and one in the FA Cup. He continued his footballing tour in the Second Division with Barnsley, followed by what proved to be his longest stay at any club – three seasons in the Third Division South with Exeter City – and, to complete the Football League set, a year at Wigan Borough in the Third Division North, where he was one of a number of new arrivals after the club's financial difficulties had forced the sale of their best players.

In 1930 he spent a few months with Southern League club Bath City before returning to the Football League with Torquay United and then Mansfield Town. Phoenix then tried his luck in the first season of professional football in France with Division 1 side Racing Club de Paris. In 1933 he came back to English non-League football for a few months with Cheshire League side Sandbach Ramblers, ending the season with Shelbourne in the League of Ireland. Phoenix spent the 1934–35 season playing in the Birmingham & District League, starting off with Colwyn Bay United before moving on to Brierley Hill Alliance in January 1935. He finished off his travels with Ballymena United in the Irish League before returning to England for the final time to play out the remaining seven games of his career as a wing half in the Cheshire League with Mossley.

== Notes ==
A. ^{a} ^{b} ^{c} Matthews gives Phoenix as born on 5 July 1897 in Hadfield, Derbyshire (Matthews was known to fabricate details), but other sources give dates and places varying in precision but not incompatible with 5 March 1902 in Patricroft, which is now in Greater Manchester.
