= Thomas Lakeman =

American novelist

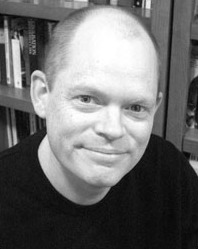
- Author Thomas Lakeman
- Born: March 10, 1964 (age 61)
- Occupation: American writer

Thomas Lakeman (born March 10, 1964) is the author of three mystery novels published by St. Martin's Minotaur. These include The Shadow Catchers (2006), Chillwater Cove (2007) and Broken Wing (2009).

Lakeman wrote numerous stage plays for production by the Playhouse in the Park in Mobile, Alabama.

In 1986 he was awarded a Thomas J. Watson Fellowship for independent study abroad. During his tenure as Digital Planet's creative director he was responsible for many of the Web's first movie promotional sites, including Web campaigns for Twelve Monkeys and Apollo 13. He was also writer and co-creator of the animated Web series Madeleine's Mind..
