= Joe Murphy (footballer, born 1873) =

English footballer

Personal information
- Full name: James Joseph Murphy
- Date of birth: 1873
- Place of birth: Stockton-on-Tees, England
- Position: Wing-half

Senior career*
Years	Team	Apps	(Gls)
?–1893	Benburb		
1893–1897	Hibernian	60	(10)
1897–1898	Stoke	49	(2)
1899–1900	Woolwich Arsenal	27	(0)
1900–1901	Raith Rovers		
1901–?	Cowdenbeath		
Total		136	(12)
- * Club domestic league appearances and goals

James Joseph Murphy (born 1873) was an English footballer who played in the Scottish League for Hibernian, and in the Football League for Stoke and Woolwich Arsenal. He often went by the nickname Judge because he wore a wig.

== Career ==
Murphy was born in Stockton-on-Tees but started his career in Scotland with Benburb, then joined Scottish League Second Division club Hibernian, where he made 70 appearances scoring twelve goals in four seasons. On 31 May 1894, he played in the final of the Rosebery Charity Cup against Hearts. Hibs won the match 4–2, despite an own goal from Murphy. He also featured in the finals of the competition in 1896 and 1897, both also against Hearts, with Hibs winning the latter.

Murphy joined Stoke in time for the 1897–98 season. Stoke struggled throughout the campaign and finished in bottom place. They entered the end of season test matches with Newcastle United and Burnley. Murphy played in all four matches including the final match against Burnley where both teams went into the match knowing that a draw would see them remain in the First Division and throughout the 90 minutes not a single attempt on goal was made. This led to the introduction of automatic promotion and relegation. He played nineteen times during 1898–99 scoring once and left the club in January 1899 to join Woolwich Arsenal. He joined Raith Rovers in October 1900, moving on to Cowdenbeath the following year. He appeared for Forfar Athletic during the 1902–03 season.

Murphy played for the Northern Football League in a Dundee vs. League Select game in April 1902, which was won by the latter 1–0. In December 1902, he played with Hearts of Beath against Cowdenbeath in the East of Scotland Qualifying Cup final. Cowdenbeath won 3–2.

== Career statistics ==
Club	Season	League			FA Cup		Test Match		Total	
Club	Season	Division	Apps	Goals	Apps	Goals	Apps	Goals	Apps	Goals
Hibernian	1893–94	Scottish Division Two	14	5	2	1	—		16	6
Hibernian	1894–95	Scottish Division Two	15	3	3	1	—		18	4
Hibernian	1895–96	Scottish Division One	18	2	5	0	—		23	2
Hibernian	1896–97	Scottish Division One	13	0	0	0	—		13	0
Hibernian	Total		60	10	10	2	—		70	12
Stoke	1897–98	First Division	30	1	3	0	4	0	37	1
Stoke	1898–99	First Division	19	1	0	0	—		19	1
Stoke	Total		49	2	3	0	4	0	56	2
Woolwich Arsenal	1899–1900	Second Division	27	0	5	0	—		32	0
Career Total			136	12	18	2	4	0	158	14
