= Harry Mellor (footballer, born 1895) =

English footballer

Personal information
- Date of birth: 1895
- Place of birth: Blackpool, England
- Position: Centre forward

Senior career*
Years	Team	Apps	(Gls)
1921–1922	Nelson	1	(0)
1922–1926	South Shore		
1926–1927	Eccles United		
- New Mills
- * Club domestic league appearances and goals

Harry Mellor (1895 – after 1926) was an English professional footballer who played as a centre forward. He made one league appearance in the Football League Third Division North for Nelson in the 1921–22 campaign.
