= Jimmy Jones (footballer, born 1876) =

English footballer

Personal information
- Full name: Thomas James Jones
- Date of birth: 1876
- Place of birth: Newcastle-Under-Lyme, England
- Position: Inside forward

Senior career*
Years	Team	Apps	(Gls)
1897	Newcastle Swifts		
1898	Congleton Hornets		
1898–1901	Stoke	26	(9)
1901	Crewe Alexandra		
- * Club domestic league appearances and goals

Thomas James Jones (born 1876) was an English footballer who played in the Football League for Stoke.

== Career ==
Jones was born in Newcastle-Under-Lyme and played for local amateur clubs Newcastle Swifts and Congleton Hornets before joining Stoke in November 1898. He took the place at inside-forward and it took him until the final three matches of the 1899–1900 season before he found the back of the net scoring five goals. He was moved to outside left for the 1900–01 season but lost his place in January 1901 to Len Benbow and decided to leave for Crewe Alexandra.

== Career statistics ==
Appearances and goals by club, season and competition
Club	Season	League			FA Cup		Total	
Club	Season	Division	Apps	Goals	Apps	Goals	Apps	Goals
Stoke	1899–1900	First Division	14	5	2	0	16	5
Stoke	1900–01	First Division	12	4	1	0	13	4
Career total			26	9	3	0	29	9
