= Jim Jones (1940s outfielder) =

American baseball player

- Outfielder

Negro league baseball debut
- 1943, for the Baltimore Elite Giants

Last appearance
- 1943, for the Baltimore Elite Giants

Teams
- Baltimore Elite Giants (1943)

James Jones is an American former Negro league outfielder who played in the 1940s.

Jones played for the Baltimore Elite Giants in 1943. In 26 recorded games, he posted 18 hits in 77 plate appearances.
