= Jim Jones (rugby union) =

- Full name: James Jones
- Born: 4 October 1893 Abergwynfi, Wales
- Died: 3 March 1934 (aged 40) Briton Ferry, Wales

Rugby union career
- Position: Wing-forward
International career
Years	Team	Apps	(Points)
1919–21	Wales	6	(0)

James Jones (4 October 1893 — 3 March 1934) was a Welsh international rugby union player.

Jones was born in Abergwynfi and played his early rugby for Treherbert.

A wing-forward, Jones received his first Wales call up in 1919, during his first season with Aberavon. He debuted against the New Zealand Army team and gained a further five caps over the next two years.

Jones later captained Briton Ferry and was licensee of the local Royal Dock Hotel.

== See also ==
- List of Wales national rugby union players
