= Jim Jones (cricketer) =

New Zealand cricketer

- Jones in 1950

Personal information
- Full name: James Frederick Jones
- Born: 18 December 1931; Wellington, New Zealand
- Died: 1 July 1998 (aged 66); Napier, New Zealand
- Batting: Right-handed
- Bowling: Right-arm fast-medium

Domestic team information
- Years: Team
- 1950/51–1953/54: Wellington
- 1954/55–1956/57: Central Districts

Career statistics
Competition	First-class
Matches	10
Runs scored	75
Batting average	7.50
100s/50s	0/0
Top score	16*
Balls bowled	1,677
Wickets	32
Bowling average	21.50
5 wickets in innings	0
10 wickets in match	0
Best bowling	4/39
Catches/stumpings	4/–
- Source: Cricinfo, 25 August 2019

James Frederick Jones (18 December 1931 – 1 July 1998) was a New Zealand cricketer who played first-class cricket for Wellington and Central Districts from 1950 to 1957.

A right-arm fast-medium bowler, Jim Jones twice took his best first-class figures of 4 for 39. In 1950–51, in his second match, he took 2 for 24 and 4 for 39 in Wellington's victory over Auckland. In 1953–54, in his first match for Central Districts, he took 4 for 55 and 4 for 39 in a drawn match against Wellington.
