= George Jakeman =

English footballer (1903–1973)

Personal information
- Full name: George John William Jakeman
- Date of birth: 19 May 1903
- Place of birth: Small Heath, England
- Date of death: 1973 (aged 69–70)
- Position: Defender

Senior career*
Years	Team	Apps	(Gls)
1920–1921	Wolseley Motors		
1921–1924	Metropolitan Carriage Works		
1924–1929	Aston Villa	8	(0)
1929–1933	Notts County	70	(0)
1933–1935	Kidderminster Harriers		
1935	Cradley Heath		
Total		78	(0)
- * Club domestic league appearances and goals

George John William Jakeman (19 May 1903 – 1973) was an English footballer who played in the Football League for Aston Villa and Notts County.
