= Jimmie Jones (disambiguation) =

Jimmie Jones (born 1966) is a former American football defensive tackle.

Jimmie Jones may also refer to:

- Jimmie Jones (defensive end) (born 1947), American football player
- Jimmie Jones (running back) (born 1950), American football player
- "Jimmie Jones", a song by The Vapors from Magnets
