= Jimmy Jones (footballer, born 1919) =

Welsh footballer

Personal information
- Full name: Benjamin James Jones
- Date of birth: 16 November 1919
- Place of birth: Tonypandy, Wales
- Date of death: 1976 (aged 56–57)
- Place of death: Watford, England
- Positions: Left-back; winger

Senior career*
Years	Team	Apps	(Gls)
1934–1947	Slough Town	80	(25)
- → Rhondda Working Men's Club
1947–1954	Watford	158	(0)
1955–1959	Chelmsford City		

International career
1947	Wales Amateurs	2	(0)
- * Club domestic league appearances and goals

Benjamin James Jones (16 November 1919 – 1976) was a Welsh footballer who played as a left-back.

== Club career ==
In 1934, Jones signed for Slough Town. At Slough, Jones played as both a left-back and a winger. During World War II, Jones returned to his native Wales to work down the mines as a Bevin Boy, combining this with playing local football for Rhondda Working Men's Club. During this time, Jones fell ill and spent six months in hospital. In September 1947, Jones joined Watford. Jones made 158 Football League appearances whilst at Watford over the course of six seasons, including a run of 47 consecutive league games played. In July 1955, following a year long sabbatical from football, Jones signed for Chelmsford City.

== International career ==
In 1947, Jones made two appearances for Wales Amateurs against England Amateurs.
