= Jimmy Jones (footballer, born 1927) =

English footballer

Personal information
- Full name: James Alfred Jones
- Date of birth: 3 August 1927
- Place of birth: Birkenhead, England
- Date of death: 5 May 2015 (aged 87)
- Place of death: Horncastle, Lincolnshire, England
- Position: Goalkeeper

Senior career*
Years	Team	Apps	(Gls)
1946–1950	Everton	0	(0)
1950–1951	New Brighton	32	(0)
1951–1953	Lincoln City	76	(0)
1953–1955	Accrington Stanley	46	(0)
1954–1955	Rochdale	177	(0)
Total		331	(0)
- * Club domestic league appearances and goals

James Alfred Jones (3 August 1927 – 5 May 2015) was an English professional footballer who played as a goalkeeper for Accrington Stanley in the Football League.
