= Fred Molyneux (footballer, born 1873) =

English footballer

Personal information
- Full name: Fredrick Leatherbarrow Molyneux
- Date of birth: 1873
- Place of birth: Bolton, England
- Position: Forward

Senior career*
Years	Team	Apps	(Gls)
1893–1897	3rd Grenadiers		
1897–1898	Stoke	11	(3)
1899	Bristol City		
1899	Berwick Rangers (Worcester)		
1899	Dudley Town		
1900	Luton Town		
1900	Fulham		
1901	Kidderminster Harriers		
- * Club domestic league appearances and goals

Fredrick Leatherbarrow Molyneux (born 1873) was an English footballer who played in the Football League for Stoke.

== Career ==
Molyneux joined Stoke after leaving the 3rd Grenadiers in 1897. He was made reserve forward by Horace Austerberry and played 14 matches in two season scoring 5 goals. During the 1898–99 season Stoke had a fine run in the FA Cup reaching the semi-final against Derby County, due to injury to Jack Farrell Molyneux started the match and Stoke went on to lose 3–1. The local paper, The Evening Sentinel criticised Molyneux's performance and he left the club soon after. He later went on to play for several Southern League clubs.

== Career statistics ==
Club	Season	League			FA Cup		Test Match		Total	
Club	Season	Division	Apps	Goals	Apps	Goals	Apps	Goals	Apps	Goals
Stoke	1897–98	First Division	5	2	0	0	2	0	7	2
Stoke	1898–99	First Division	6	1	3	2	—		9	3
Career Total			11	3	3	2	2	0	16	5
