= Jim Jones (ice hockey) =

Canadian ice hockey player

- Born: July 27, 1949 (age 77) Espanola, Ontario, Canada
- Height: 5 ft 10 in (178 cm)
- Weight: 185 lb (84 kg; 13 st 3 lb)
- Position: Defenceman
- Shot: Left
- Played for: California Golden Seals
- NHL draft: 69th overall, 1969; Boston Bruins
- Playing career: 1969–1976

James William Jones (born July 27, 1949) is a Canadian former professional ice hockey defenceman.

== Career ==
Jones was drafted by the Boston Bruins in the 1969 NHL Amateur Draft, but did not see any playing time with them. He was signed as a free agent by the California Golden Seals in June, 1971, appearing in two games for the Seals. He spent the majority of his career with the Seals playing for their minor league affiliates in the Western Hockey League, International Hockey League and American Hockey League (the Salt Lake Golden Eagles, Columbus Seals and Baltimore Clippers, respectively).

In September 1973, he signed a contract with the Chicago Cougars of the World Hockey Association, playing in a single game. Jones retired in 1976.

== Personal life ==
Jones is the brother of Bob Jones.

== Career statistics ==
=== Regular season and playoffs ===
			Regular season					Playoffs
Season	Team	League	GP	G	A	Pts	PIM	GP	G	A	Pts	PIM
1966–67	Kitchener Rangers	OHA	44	1	2	3	10	13	0	0	0	0
1967–68	Kitchener Rangers	OHA	11	3	1	4	6	—	—	—	—	—
1967–68	Peterborough Petes	OHA	42	6	19	25	31	5	1	3	4	2
1968–69	Peterborough Petes	OHA	54	10	42	52	73	10	0	5	5	2
1969–70	Oklahoma City Blazers	CHL	63	4	10	14	54	—	—	—	—	—
1970–71	Oklahoma City Blazers	CHL	36	1	2	3	26	—	—	—	—	—
1971–72	California Golden Seals	NHL	2	0	0	0	0	—	—	—	—	—
1971–72	Salt Lake Golden Eagles	WHL	28	2	7	9	20	—	—	—	—	—
1972–73	Baltimore Clippers	AHL	16	1	2	3	12	—	—	—	—	—
1972–73	Columbus Seals	IHL	40	3	15	18	52	—	—	—	—	—
1972–73	Salt Lake Golden Eagles	WHL	17	0	3	3	16	9	1	1	2	0
1973–74	Chicago Cougars	WHA	1	0	0	0	0	—	—	—	—	—
1973–74	Winston-Salem Polar Twins	SHL	49	2	17	19	35	7	1	5	6	6
1974–75	Port Huron Wings	IHL	17	1	5	6	14	—	—	—	—	—
1974–75	Greensboro Generals	SHL	35	7	20	27	18	—	—	—	—	—
1974–75	Philadelphia Firebirds	NAHL	12	0	1	1	16	4	0	1	1	0
1975–76	Roanoke Valley Rebels	SHL	8	0	2	2	4	—	—	—	—	—
NHL totals			2	0	0	0	0	—	—	—	—	—
WHA totals			1	0	0	0	0	—	—	—	—	—
