= Jim Jones (American football, born 1935) =

American gridiron football player (1935–1982)

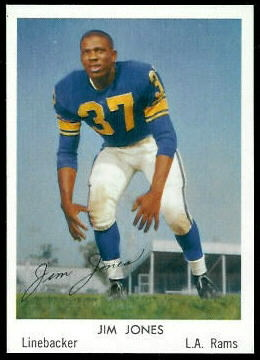

No. 37, 14, 32
- Position: Defensive back

Personal information
- Born: May 6, 1935; Waco, Texas, U.S.
- Died: October 5, 1982 (aged 47); King County, Washington, U.S.
- Listed height: 6 ft 1 in (1.85 m)
- Listed weight: 204 lb (93 kg)

Career information
- High school: Lincoln (Tacoma, Washington)
- College: Washington
- NFL draft: 1958: 3rd round, 30th overall pick

Career history
- Los Angeles Rams (1958); BC Lions (1960–1961); Oakland Raiders (1961)

Awards and highlights
- First-team All-PCC (1957)
- Stats at Pro Football Reference

James Ray Jones (May 6, 1935 – October 5, 1982) was an American professional football player who was a defensive back for one season with the Los Angeles Rams of the National Football League (NFL). He was selected by the Rams in the third round of the 1958 NFL draft. He played college football for the Washington Huskies. Jones also played professionally for the BC Lions of the Canadian Football League (CFL) and Oakland Raiders of the American Football League (AFL).

== Early life ==
Jones played high school football at Lincoln High School in Tacoma, Washington, earning all-state honors as a fullback.

== College career ==
Jones played for the Huskies at the University of Washington from 1956 to 1957, recording career totals of 852 rushing yards and two rushing touchdowns. He earned first-team All-PCC honors and was co-captain of the Huskies his senior year in 1957. He was invited to the Chicago College All-Star Game in 1958.

== Professional career ==
Jones was selected by the Los Angeles Rams in the third round with the 30th overall pick in the 1958 NFL draft. He played in all twelve games for the Rams during the 1958 season. He played in fifteen games for the BC Lions from 1960 to 1961. Jones played in one game for the Oakland Raiders in 1961.

== Personal life ==
Jones died on October 5, 1982, in King County, Washington, after a scuba diving accident near Seattle. He was an insurance agent for Allstate at the time of his death.
