= 1933–34 Port Vale F.C. season =

Port Vale F.C.
1933–34 season
- Chairman: Frank Huntbach
- Manager: Tom Holford
- Stadium: Old Recreation Ground
- Football League Second Division: 8th (45 points)
- FA Cup: Third Round (eliminated by Charlton Athletic)
- Welsh Cup: Semi-finals (eliminated by Bristol City)
- Top goalscorer: League: Tom Nolan (22); All: Tom Nolan (22)
- Highest home attendance: 14,216 vs. Blackpool, 20 January 1934
- Lowest home attendance: 2,990 vs. Nottingham Forest, 5 May 1934
- Average home league attendance: 10,051
- Biggest win: 4–0 and 5–1
- Biggest defeat: 1–6 vs. Nottingham Forest, 23 December 1933
Home colours

The 1933–34 season was Port Vale's 28th season of football in the English Football League, and their fourth-successive season (27th overall) in the Second Division. Under manager Tom Holford, the club enjoyed a breakthrough campaign — finishing 8th in the Second Division with 45 points, their best league placing since the 1930–31 season and one they would not improve upon until 1996–97.

A major driving force was centre‑forward Tom Nolan, who struck 22 goals in 32 league appearances, including hat‑tricks against Bury, Hull City, and Nottingham Forest, becoming the club's top scorer for the season. Vale's defensive solidity was also notable — they conceded just 55 goals, the second‑lowest in the division, and kept a number of clean sheets during their fine run of early and mid‑season form.

Standout moments included an eight‑win start in their first eleven matches, positioning Vale in third place with ten games remaining, firmly in promotion contention. However, a poor run of results — including home defeats to Brentford and Burnley, and a narrow loss to West Ham United in atrocious pitch conditions — saw them slip down the table. They did end strongly with a 3–1 win over Nottingham Forest, in which Nolan earned praise for his constant threat, though attendances dipped sharply, with only 2,801 watching at one match.

In the FA Cup, Vale were knocked out in the Third Round, while in the Welsh Cup they reached the semi‑final before losing to Bristol City. Off the field, the club's average home attendance rose to around 10,051, peaking at 14,216 against Blackpool on 20 January 1934. At season's end, the board initiated a squad clear-out to cut costs and refresh personnel ahead of future campaigns. This season is remembered for unfettered ambition and glimpsed promise — close enough to promotion to inspire belief, yet ultimately frustration as Vale failed to sustain their challenge in a club season that would stand among their finest of the interwar era.

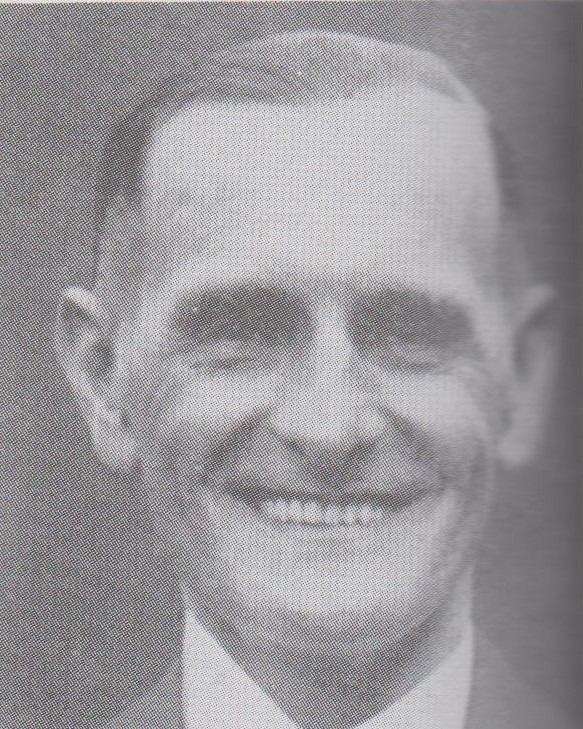
Manager Tom Holford.

Chairman Frank Huntbach stated that an average attendance of 12,000 was needed to bring the club forward, and also hit out against the Hanley traders.

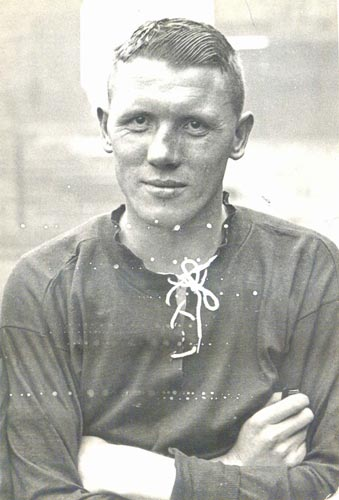
Midfielder Jack Round.

== Overview ==
=== Second Division ===
The pre-season saw the arrival of ten new professionals, six of whom were forwards. The most significant newcomers were Trevor Rhodes (Bradford Park Avenue), Jack Vickers (Charlton Athletic), as well as Ken Gunn and Billy Tabram (both from Swansea Town).

The season started with two home wins and two losses on the road. The wins kept coming, including an impressive 2–1 win at third-placed Grimsby Town that put Vale top of the table on 23 September. They slipped to a 3–2 loss at Notts County seven days later in "a thrilling struggle". This was followed by a run of five wins and two draws in seven games, with only one goal conceded. They regained top spot with a 3–1 win over Bradford Park Avenue on 21 October, whilst Vale signed Sydney Dickinson was brought in from the opposition for a "significant fee". However, the Vale then went on to lose five of their next six matches, conceding 16 goals and scoring just three. Only an excellent performance from goalkeeper Allan Todd prevented more than a three-goal defeat at Bolton Wanderers. Manchester United ended the Vale's 100% record at the Old Recreation Ground when they sneaked a 3–2 win on 2 December. Vale lost 6–1 at Nottingham Forest on 23 December. The slide was halted with a 1–0 Boxing day victory over Lincoln City in which top-scorer Tom Nolan became one of only two Vale players sent off in the period between 1918 and 1947. The result nevertheless kept the club within a point of the promotion places. This was supplemented by seven of a possible eight points in their next four games, including victories at The Dell and Valley Parade.

Their run ended on 5 February at the Old Recreation Ground with a 1–0 defeat to eventual champions Grimsby Town. From this point, the promotion campaign completely collapsed, with a 4–0 loss soon coming to Welsh strugglers Swansea. New signing Jack Blackwell from Charlton couldn't reverse the trend despite helping the side to their biggest win of the season with a 5–1 thrashing of Millwall the following week. A fortnight later and a 2–0 win over promotion-chasing Preston North End meant promotion was back on the cards for the "Valiants". The Sentinel's "Placer" commented that Vale had the easiest remaining fixtures of the chasing pack and thus had a "great chance of ascending to the First Division for the first time in their career".

Their remaining eleven games yielded a return of merely seven points, lacking a reserve team, and fatigue had set into the first team. One significant defeat came at Old Trafford, which helped Manchester United avoid relegation to the third tier for what would have been the only time in their history. Billy Tabram dislocated his collarbone in the defeat to Manchester United. Young Fred Mitcheson did make a name for himself, however, scoring a hat-trick in his debut in a 4–0 win over Plymouth Argyle. All three of his goals came within the space of three minutes, a club record for the quickest hat-trick that would remain unlikely to ever be beaten.

They finished in eighth position, gaining 45 points from 42 games. Seven more points were required to match promoted Preston North End, though they finished twelve points clear of relegated Millwall. Billy Tabram had helped secure the Vale's defence, their 55 goals conceded the lowest in the division behind Preston. Attacking-wise, their 60 goals were a poor return for a top-of-the-table club, with 33 of these coming from Tom Nolan (22) and Trevor Rhodes (11).

=== Finances ===
On the financial side, a loss of £2,771 was announced despite strict economic budgeting. Gate receipts had risen slowly to £11,868, though a rare transfer deficit was made, and expenses had risen sharply. The club announced that it would consider offers for any of its players, blaming the fans for a lack of enthusiasm, exemplified by an attendance of 2,990 (raising just £136) for the end-of-season clash with Nottingham Forest, despite having recently built a stand with cover for 15,000 spectators. The upshot of this was the release of a massive 15 players, a list which included: Bill Cope, Sydney Dickinson, Len Armitage, and Jimmy McGrath. Billy Tabram was also sold to Hull City for a large fee, whilst Fred Mills' transfer to Leeds United and George Poyser's move to Brentford also brought in some much-needed cash. In the boardroom, Adrian Capes announced his retirement. It was, according to historian Jeff Kent, "the end of an era".

=== Cup competitions ===
In the FA Cup, defeat came in the third round to Third Division South side Charlton Athletic at The Valley despite 'special training' measures beforehand. Former Valiant Jimmy Oakes was "brilliant" for Charlton.

For the first and only time the club also entered the Welsh Cup. Vale lost out to Bristol City at the semi-final stage.

== Results ==
=== Football League Second Division ===
==== League table ====
Pos	Team	Pld	W	D	L	GF	GA	GAv	Pts
6	Bradford City	42	20	6	16	73	67	1.090	46
7	West Ham United	42	17	11	14	78	70	1.114	45
8	Port Vale	42	19	7	16	60	55	1.091	45
9	Oldham Athletic	42	17	10	15	72	60	1.200	44
10	Plymouth Argyle	42	15	13	14	69	70	0.986	43

Rules for classification: 1) Points; 2) Goal average; 3) Goals scored

==== Results by matchday ====
Round	1	2	3	4	5	6	7	8	9	10	11	12	13	14	15	16	17	18	19	20	21	22	23	24	25	26	27	28	29	30	31	32	33	34	35	36	37	38	39	40	41	42
Ground	A	H	H	A	A	H	A	A	H	A	H	A	H	A	H	A	H	A	H	A	A	H	H	A	H	A	H	H	A	H	A	H	A	H	H	A	A	H	A	H	A	H
Result	L	W	W	L	W	W	W	L	W	W	W	D	W	D	W	L	L	L	D	L	L	W	D	W	W	W	L	D	L	W	D	W	L	L	W	L	L	D	L	W	L	W
Position	18	10	7	12	5	4	1	6	2	2	1	1	1	2	2	2	3	4	4	6	8	6	6	4	3	2	3	3	6	5	4	3	5	6	5	6	8	7	9	6	8	8
Points	0	2	4	4	6	8	10	10	12	14	16	17	19	20	22	22	22	22	23	23	23	25	26	28	30	32	32	33	33	35	36	38	38	38	40	40	40	41	41	43	43	45

Source: Statto
A = Away; H = Home; W = Win; D = Draw; L = Loss

==== Matches ====
26 August 1933 1	Fulham	3–0	Port Vale	Fulham, West London
		Report		Stadium: Craven Cottage; Attendance: 21,070

28 August 1933 2	Port Vale	4–1	Bury	Hanley
	Nolan; McGrath	Report		Stadium: Old Recreation Ground; Attendance: 8,416

2 September 1933 3	Port Vale	2–1	Southampton	Hanley
	Gunn	Report	Drake	Stadium: Old Recreation Ground; Attendance: 11,237

9 September 1933 4	Blackpool	1–0	Port Vale	Blackpool
		Report		Stadium: Bloomfield Road; Attendance: 16,988

11 September 1933 5	Bury	0–3	Port Vale	Bury, Greater Manchester
		Report	Rhodes; Gunn; Tabram	Stadium: Gigg Lane; Attendance: 6,197

16 September 1933 6	Port Vale	3–1	Bradford City	Hanley
	Rhodes; Morton; Nolan	Report		Stadium: Old Recreation Ground; Attendance: 11,453

23 September 1933 7	Grimsby Town	1–2	Port Vale	Cleethorpes
		Report	Nolan; Morton	Stadium: Blundell Park; Attendance: 10,505

30 September 1933 8	Notts County	3–2	Port Vale	Nottingham
		Report	Nolan	Stadium: Meadow Lane; Attendance: 15,364

7 October 1933 9	Port Vale	1–0	Swansea Town	Hanley
	Rhodes	Report		Stadium: Old Recreation Ground; Attendance: 9,478

14 October 1933 10	Millwall	0–3	Port Vale	New Cross, Lewisham
		Report	Gunn; Rhodes; Nolan	Stadium: The Den; Attendance: 12,045

21 October 1933 11	Port Vale	3–1	Bradford (Park Avenue)	Hanley
	Nolan; Morton	Report		Stadium: Old Recreation Ground; Attendance: 13,122

28 October 1933 12	Preston North End	0–0	Port Vale	Preston, Lancashire
		Report		Stadium: Deepdale; Attendance: 14,160

4 November 1933 13	Port Vale	2–0	Oldham Athletic	Hanley
	Nolan; Rhodes	Report		Stadium: Old Recreation Ground; Attendance: 12,228

11 November 1933 14	Burnley	0–0	Port Vale	Burnley
		Report		Stadium: Turf Moor; Attendance: 13,445

18 November 1933 15	Port Vale	1–0	Brentford	Hanley
	Gunn	Report		Stadium: Old Recreation Ground; Attendance: 11,349

25 November 1933 16	Bolton Wanderers	3–0	Port Vale	Bolton
		Report		Stadium: Burnden Park; Attendance: 14,925

2 December 1933 17	Port Vale	2–3	Manchester United	Hanley
	Nolan; Rhodes	Report	Brown; Dewar; Black	Stadium: Old Recreation Ground; Attendance: 10,316

9 December 1933 18	Plymouth Argyle	3–0	Port Vale	Plymouth
	Grozier; Black; Cookson	Report		Stadium: Home Park; Attendance: 13,672

16 December 1933 19	Port Vale	0–0	West Ham United	Hanley
		Report		Stadium: Old Recreation Ground; Attendance: 6,610

23 December 1933 20	Nottingham Forest	6–1	Port Vale	West Bridgford
15:00 GMT	Peacock 28', 39', 41', 81'; Race 48'; Dent 58'	Report	Rhodes	Stadium: City Ground; Attendance: 9,239; Referee: P Snape

25 December 1933 21	Lincoln City	1–0	Port Vale	Lincoln
		Report		Stadium: Sincil Bank; Attendance: 11,584

26 December 1933 22	Port Vale	1–0	Lincoln City	Hanley
	Nolan	Report		Stadium: Old Recreation Ground; Attendance: 13,910

30 December 1933 23	Port Vale	2–2	Fulham	Hanley
	Gunn; Rhodes	Report		Stadium: Old Recreation Ground; Attendance: 8,151

6 January 1934 24	Southampton	1–4	Port Vale	Southampton
	Campbell	Report	Rhodes; Morton	Stadium: The Dell; Attendance: 9,987

20 January 1934 25	Port Vale	1–0	Blackpool	Hanley
	McGrath	Report		Stadium: Old Recreation Ground; Attendance: 14,216

27 January 1934 26	Bradford City	1–2	Port Vale	Bradford
		Report	Dickinson; Mills	Stadium: Valley Parade; Attendance: 12,719

5 February 1934 27	Port Vale	0–1	Grimsby Town	Hanley
		Report		Stadium: Old Recreation Ground; Attendance: 12,662

10 February 1934 28	Port Vale	0–0	Notts County	Hanley
		Report		Stadium: Old Recreation Ground; Attendance: 10,645

22 February 1934 28	Swansea Town	4–0	Port Vale	Swansea
		Report		Stadium: Vetch Field; Attendance: 5,764

24 February 1934 30	Port Vale	5–1	Millwall	Hanley
	Blackwell; Gunn; Mills; Nolan	Report		Stadium: Old Recreation Ground; Attendance: 8,578

3 March 1934 31	Bradford (Park Avenue)	2–2	Port Vale	Bradford
		Report	Gunn; Dickinson	Stadium: Park Avenue; Attendance: 11,548

10 March 1934 32	Port Vale	2–0	Preston North End	Hanley
	Morton	Report		Stadium: Old Recreation Ground; Attendance: 12,972

17 March 1934 33	Oldham Athletic	5–1	Port Vale	Oldham
		Report	Nolan	Stadium: Boundary Park; Attendance: 5,900

24 March 1934 34	Port Vale	0–2	Burnley	Hanley
		Report		Stadium: Old Recreation Ground; Attendance: 7,367

30 March 1934 35	Port Vale	3–0	Hull City	Hanley
15:00 BST	Nolan	Report		Stadium: Old Recreation Ground; Attendance: 10,502

31 March 1934 36	Brentford	2–0	Port Vale	Brentford, West London
	Holliday; Scott	Report		Stadium: Griffin Park; Attendance: 19,758

2 April 1934 37	Hull City	2–1	Port Vale	Kingston upon Hull
15:15 BST	Jordan 48'; Hubbard 75'	Report	Blackwell	Stadium: Anlaby Road; Attendance: 13,333

7 April 1934 38	Port Vale	0–0	Bolton Wanderers	Hanley
		Report		Stadium: Old Recreation Ground; Attendance: 9,923

14 April 1934 39	Manchester United	2–0	Port Vale	Old Trafford
	Brown; McMillen	Report		Stadium: Old Trafford; Attendance: 14,777

21 April 1934 40	Port Vale	4–0	Plymouth Argyle	Hanley
	Mitcheson; Nolan	Report		Stadium: Old Recreation Ground; Attendance: 4,956

28 April 1934 41	West Ham United	1–0	Port Vale	Upton Park, London
	Ruffell	Report		Stadium: Boleyn Ground; Attendance: 9,893

5 May 1934 42	Port Vale	3–1	Nottingham Forest	Hanley
15:00 BST	Nolan	Report	Dent 28'	Stadium: Old Recreation Ground; Attendance: 2,990; Referee: P Snape

=== FA Cup ===
13 January 1934 R3	Charlton Athletic	2–0	Port Vale	Charlton, London
		Report		Stadium: The Valley; Attendance: 18,821

== Squad statistics ==
=== Appearances and goals ===
Key to positions: GK – Goalkeeper; FB – Full back; HB – Half back; FW – Forward

No.	Pos	Nat	Player	Total		Second Division		FA Cup	
No.	Pos	Nat	Player	Apps	Goals	Apps	Goals	Apps	Goals
	GK	(Wales) WAL	Ormond Jones	14	0	14	0	0	0
	GK	(Scotland) SCO	Allan Todd	29	0	28	0	1	0
	FB	(England) ENG	Ernest Breeze	4	0	4	0	0	0
	FB	(England) ENG	Bill Cope	14	0	13	0	1	0
	FB	(England) ENG	George Shenton	10	0	10	0	0	0
	FB	(England) ENG	George Poyser	39	0	38	0	1	0
	FB	(England) ENG	Jack Vickers	33	0	32	0	1	0
	HB	(England) ENG	Cliff Birks	11	0	11	0	0	0
	HB	(England) ENG	Sydney Dickinson	12	2	12	2	0	0
	HB	(Scotland) SCO	Ken Gunn	39	8	38	8	1	0
	HB	(England) ENG	Roger Jones	29	0	28	0	1	0
	HB	(England) ENG	Jimmy McGrath	39	3	38	3	1	0
	HB	(England) ENG	Fred Mills	38	2	37	2	1	0
	HB	(England) ENG	Trevor Rhodes	31	11	30	11	1	0
	HB	(England) ENG	Jack Round	3	0	3	0	0	0
	HB	(Wales) WAL	Billy Tabram	36	1	35	1	1	0
	HB	(England) ENG	Richard Twiss	1	0	1	0	0	0
	FW	(England) ENG	Len Armitage	2	0	1	0	1	0
	FW	(England) ENG	Horace Baker	3	0	3	0	0	0
	FW	(England) ENG	Jack Blackwell	12	3	12	3	0	0
	FW	(Wales) WAL	Robert G. Davies	2	0	2	0	0	0
	FW	(England) ENG	Fred Mitcheson	3	3	3	3	0	0
	FW	(England) ENG	Bob Morton	33	5	33	5	0	0
	FW	(England) ENG	Tom Nolan	32	22	32	22	0	0
	FW	(England) ENG	Albert Purcell	2	0	2	0	0	0
	FW	(England) ENG	Billy Webster	0	0	0	0	0	0
Players who featured but departed the club during the season:
	FW	(Scotland) SCO	Peter Cunningham	2	0	2	0	0	0

=== Top scorers ===
Place	Position	Nation	Name	Second Division	FA Cup	Total
1	FW	England	Tom Nolan	22	0	22
2	HB	England	Trevor Rhodes	11	0	11
3	HB	Scotland	Ken Gunn	8	0	8
4	FW	England	Bob Morton	5	0	5
5	HB	England	Jimmy McGrath	3	0	3
–	FW	England	Fred Mitcheson	3	0	3
–	FW	England	Jack Blackwell	3	0	3
8	HB	England	Fred Mills	2	0	2
–	HB	England	Sydney Dickinson	2	0	2
10	HB	Wales	Billy Tabram	1	0	1
			TOTALS	60	0	60

== Transfers ==
=== Transfers in ===
Date from	Position	Nationality	Name	From	Fee	Ref.
May 1933	FW	SCO	Peter Cunningham	Barnsley	Free transfer	
May 1933	HB	SCO	Ken Gunn	Swansea Town	£400	
May 1933	GK	WAL	Ormond Jones	Yeovil & Petters United	Free transfer	
May 1933	FB	ENG	Jack Vickers	Charlton Athletic	£200	
June 1933	HB	ENG	Trevor Rhodes	Bradford Park Avenue	Free transfer	
July 1933	FW	ENG	Fred Mitcheson	Wolverhampton Wanderers	Free transfer	
August 1933	HB	ENG	Richard Twiss	Wolverhampton Wanderers	Free transfer	
November 1933	HB	ENG	Sydney Dickinson	Bradford Park Avenue	'Substantial'	
November 1933	FW	ENG	Albert Purcell	Kidsgrove Liverpool Road	Free transfer	
February 1934	FW	ENG	Jack Blackwell	Charlton Athletic	Free transfer	

=== Transfers out ===
Date from	Position	Nationality	Name	To	Fee	Ref.
November 1933	FW	SCO	Peter Cunningham	Crewe Alexandra	Free transfer	
May 1934	FB	ENG	William Allsop	Halifax Town	Free transfer	
May 1934	FW	ENG	Len Armitage	Tranmere Rovers	Free transfer	
May 1934	FW	ENG	Horace Baker	Longton Hall	Free transfer	
May 1934	FW	ENG	Robert G. Davies	Torquay United	Free transfer	
May 1934	GK	WAL	Ormond Jones	Norwich City	Free transfer	
May 1934	HB	ENG	Billy Tabram	Hull City	Free transfer	
June 1934	HB	ENG	Jimmy McGrath	Notts County	Free transfer	
June 1934	HB	ENG	Fred Mills	Leeds United	Undisclosed	
June 1934	FB	ENG	George Poyser	Brentford	£1,550	
Summer 1934	FB	ENG	Bill Cope		Released	
Summer 1934	HB	ENG	Sydney Dickinson	Lincoln City	Released	
Summer 1934	HB	ENG	Richard Twiss	Bournemouth & Boscombe Athletic	Free transfer	
