= History of Manchester United F.C. =

The history of Manchester United F.C. spans the period from 1878 to the present day. For detail on individual periods of the club's history, see one of the following articles:

- History of Manchester United F.C. (1878–1945)
- History of Manchester United F.C. (1945–1969)
- History of Manchester United F.C. (1969–1986)
- History of Manchester United F.C. (1986–2013)

For a season-by-season account of Manchester United's history, see List of Manchester United F.C. seasons.
