= Richard Twiss (disambiguation) =

Richard Twiss was a Native American educator and writer.

Richard Twiss may also refer to:

- Richard Twiss (footballer) (1909–1970), English footballer
- Richard Twiss (writer) (1747–1821), English writer known for books on travel and chess
- Richard Q. Twiss (1920–2005), British astronomer
