= History of Manchester United F.C. (1945–1969) =

History of an English football club

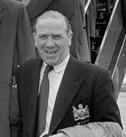
Sir Matt Busby

Manchester United Football Club is an English professional football club, based in Old Trafford, Greater Manchester, that plays in the Premier League. Founded as Newton Heath LYR Football Club in 1878, they changed their name to Manchester United in 1902.

United had been league champions in 1908 and 1911, as well as winning the FA Cup in 1909, but the interwar years were less successful as financial problems blighted the club, who spent the 1920s and 1930s bouncing between the First and Second Divisions. The club's Old Trafford stadium was severely damaged in a German air raid in March 1941 during the Second World War, and the club did not return there until the stadium's rebuilding was completed in 1949, until which time their home games were played at Maine Road, the stadium of Manchester City.

In October 1945, the impending resumption of football led to the appointment of Matt Busby as the club's manager; he demanded an unprecedented level of control over team selection, player transfers and training sessions. Busby led the team to second-place league finishes in 1947, 1948 and 1949, and to FA Cup victory in 1948, the club's first major trophy for 37 years. In 1952, the club won the First Division, their first league title for 41 years.

With an average age of 22, the media labelled the back-to-back title-winning side of 1956 and 1957 the "Busby Babes", a testament to Busby's faith in his youth players, who had gradually replaced the older players of the team that had enjoyed success in the late 1940s and early 1950s. In 1956–57, Manchester United became the first English team to compete in the European Cup, despite objections from the Football League, who had denied Chelsea the same opportunity the previous season. En route to the semi-final, which they lost to Real Madrid, the team recorded a 10–0 victory over Belgian champions Anderlecht, which remains the club's biggest victory on record.

The following season, on the way home from a European Cup quarter-final victory against Red Star Belgrade, the aircraft carrying the Manchester United players, officials and journalists crashed while attempting to take off after refuelling in Munich, Germany. The Munich air disaster of 6 February 1958 claimed 23 lives, including those of eight players – Geoff Bent, Roger Byrne, Eddie Colman, Duncan Edwards, Mark Jones, David Pegg, Tommy Taylor and Billy Whelan – and injured several more. Two other players were injured to such an extent that they never played again, and Busby was hospitalised for several months.

Reserve team manager Jimmy Murphy took over as manager while Busby recovered from his injuries and the club's makeshift side reached the FA Cup Final, which they lost to Bolton Wanderers. In recognition of the team's tragedy, UEFA invited the club to compete in the 1958–59 European Cup alongside eventual League champions Wolverhampton Wanderers. Despite approval from the FA, the Football League determined that the club should not enter the competition, since they had not qualified. In the two years that followed the tragedy, Busby built a new team around Munich survivors like Bobby Charlton, Harry Gregg and Bill Foulkes by making signings including Albert Quixall, Noel Cantwell and Maurice Setters.

Busby rebuilt the team through the 1960s by signing players such as Denis Law and Paddy Crerand, who combined with the next generation of youth players – including George Best – to win the FA Cup in 1963, the club's first major trophy since the Munich crash. The following season, they finished second in the league, then won the title in 1965 and 1967. In 1968, Manchester United became the first English club to win the European Cup, beating Benfica 4–1 in the final, with a team that contained three European Footballers of the Year: Charlton, Law and Best. Busby resigned as manager in 1969 and was replaced by the reserve team coach, former Manchester United player Wilf McGuinness.

== Appointment of Matt Busby ==
In February 1945, with the Second World War in its final few months, Matt Busby met Manchester United president James W. Gibson in Manchester, where he was offered a three-year contract to become the club's manager. At Busby's insistence, this was lengthened to five years; he was appointed manager aged only 36, having just finished a playing career that had seen him turn out for Manchester City and Liverpool as well as the Scotland national side. Busby's appointment was notable for his insistence that he had the authority to appoint his own staff and overall control of all matters related to the playing of the game, responsibilities usually held by club directors or chairmen. Busby did not assume managerial command until October 1945, after the start of the season, and his first act was to appoint former West Bromwich Albion and Wales wing half Jimmy Murphy as coach of the reserve team.

League football resumed for the 1946–47 season and United finished second with a side featuring the likes of Jack Rowley, Charlie Mitten and John Aston. The club captain was now Johnny Carey, an Irishman whose normal position was right-back but who, during his United career, played in every position except on the right wing. They finished second again in both of the next two seasons, though they did deliver the FA Cup in 1948, beating Blackpool 4–2 to claim their first major trophy for 37 years. United's stadium, Old Trafford, had been largely destroyed by German bombs in the Second World War, so they played their home fixtures at Manchester City's ground Maine Road between 1945 and 1949, when they returned to a rebuilt Old Trafford.

After a 41-year wait, league title success finally came in 1952, with United beating second-placed Arsenal 6–1 on the final day of the season to finish four points ahead of both Arsenal and Tottenham Hotspur. However, the side captained by Carey was beginning to show its age and a new set of players had to be found. Busby had already made an important signing the previous year by paying Birmingham City £25,000 for winger Johnny Berry; he had also signed young goalkeeper Ray Wood from Darlington in 1949, while a young Roger Byrne had excelled on the left wing in the title run-in, but many other positions were in need of changes.

== The Busby Babes ==
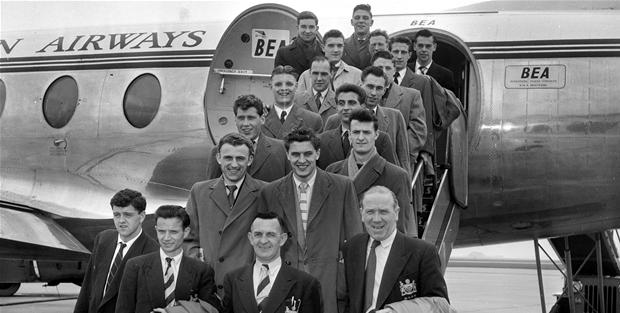
The Busby Babes in Denmark in 1955

During the Second World War, football was effectively frozen, and James Gibson set about establishing the Manchester United Junior Athletic Club (MUJAC) in 1938 with the aim of developing the ability of some of the country's most talented young players; it became a "hotbed of young talent that would sustain the club for years to come". When Busby took over in 1945, he overhauled the team; seven players were transfer-listed, several changed positions and he signed winger Jimmy Delaney from Celtic. These changes resulted in the club finishing the 1946–47 season as runners up in the First Division, and in 1948 the club won the FA Cup, beating Blackpool 4–2 in the final. At the start of the following season, Busby began selling some of the older players and replacing them with players from the Youth and Reserve teams. The term "Busby Babes" was coined in November 1951, after 18-year-old Jackie Blanchflower and 22-year-old Roger Byrne made their debuts against Liverpool at Anfield; Tom Jackson of the Manchester Evening News described them in a match report as "United's Babes".

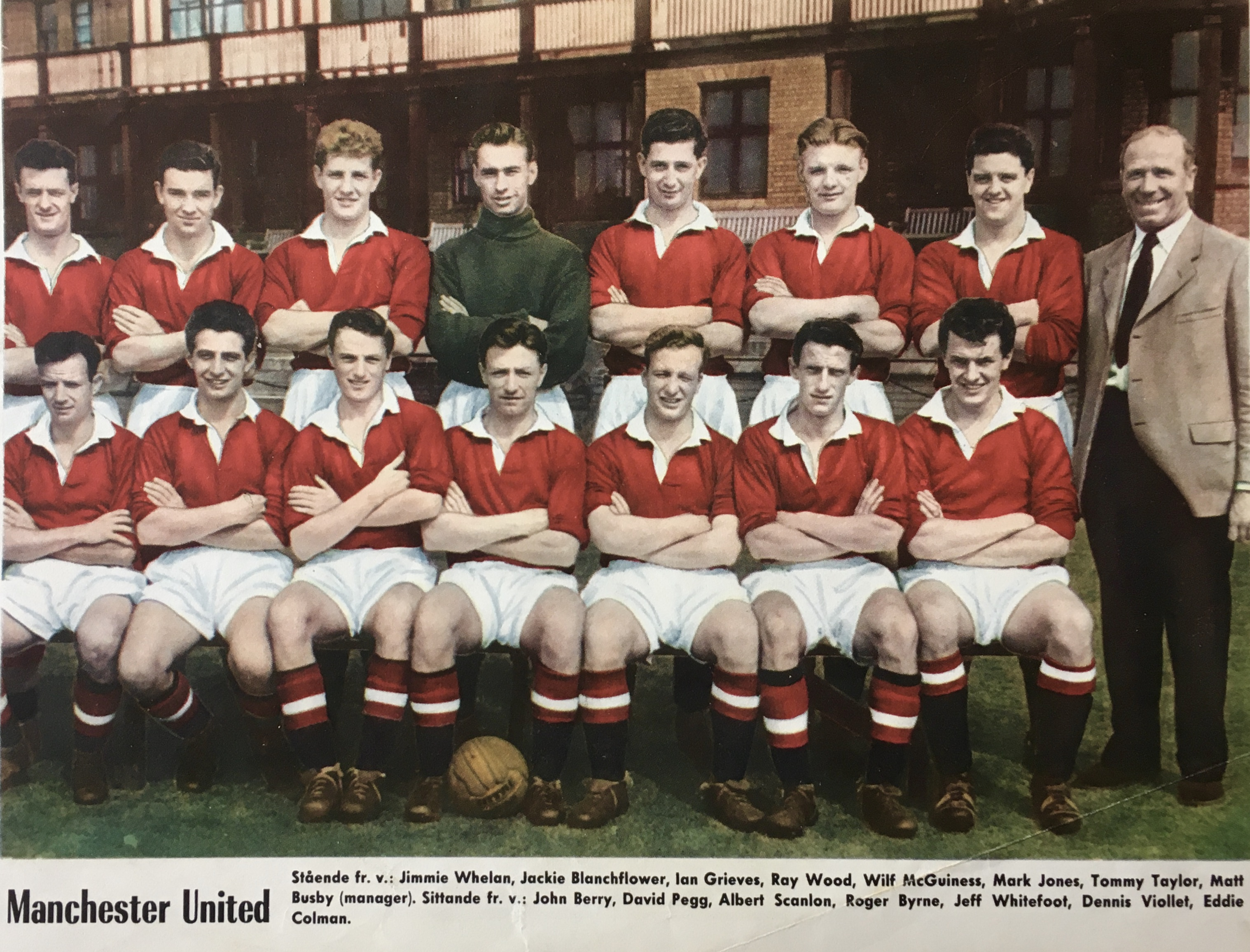
Manchester United F.C. in 1957 – from the left, standing: Liam Whelan, Jackie Blanchflower, Ian Greaves, Ray Wood, Wilf McGuinness, Mark Jones, Tommy Taylor, Matt Busby (manager); front row: Johnny Berry, David Pegg, Albert Scanlon, Roger Byrne, Jeff Whitefoot, Dennis Viollet and Eddie Colman.

The 1952–53 season saw the retirement of Johnny Carey, yet it also saw the introduction of the Busby Babes as the championship team began to lose steam. David Pegg, Dennis Viollet, Duncan Edwards, and Bill Foulkes, aged between 16 and 21, all made their first appearances in the 1952–53 season. Many of the players at this time were a tribute to the scouting skills of chief scout Joe Armstrong (assigned the duty of finding talent in the North of England), Bob Bishop (Belfast), Billy Behan (Dublin) and Bob Harper, underpinned by United's innovative youth policy under Matt Busby. United finished eighth in 1954 and fifth in 1955 before winning the league by an 11-point margin in 1955–56 with Tommy Taylor and Dennis Viollet leading the line for a side which had an average age of only 22. Only two players in the 1956 team, Roger Byrne and Johnny Berry, had collected medals in both the 1952 and 1956 title winning campaigns. Against the Football League's wishes, they became England's first representatives in the European Cup.

One of the stars of the team was Duncan Edwards, who set the record as the youngest player ever to be capped for England when he played against Scotland at the age of 17 and 8 months. The record stood for more than 40 years before being broken in 1998 by Michael Owen, who would play for United more than a decade later. His legendary status is demonstrated by the fact that he placed sixth in a 1999 poll of Manchester United fans, asking them to name the top 50 United players of all time - despite his playing career lasting just five years and up to the age of 21.

The Championship was defended successfully in 1957, with Tommy Taylor scoring 22 goals, Liam Whelan getting 26 and a young Bobby Charlton grabbing 10 goals. United also beat rivals Manchester City to win the 1956 Charity Shield and reached the FA Cup Final that season, but played without their goalkeeper Ray Wood for much of the game, eventually losing 2–1 to Aston Villa.

United's first European match was a 2–0 win away to the Belgian champions Anderlecht. The return leg was played at Maine Road as Old Trafford did not have any floodlights, and United won 10–0. This is still their record victory in a European match.

United then knocked out Borussia Dortmund and Atlético de Bilbao having come back from two goals behind against Bilbao, before losing to Real Madrid in the semi-final.

== Munich air disaster ==
On 5 February 1958, United played Red Star Belgrade in Yugoslavia, in the second leg of the European Cup quarter finals. The match ended in a 3–3 draw, but as United had already won the home leg 2–1, they won the tie 5–4 on aggregate and reached the semi-finals for the second year in succession.

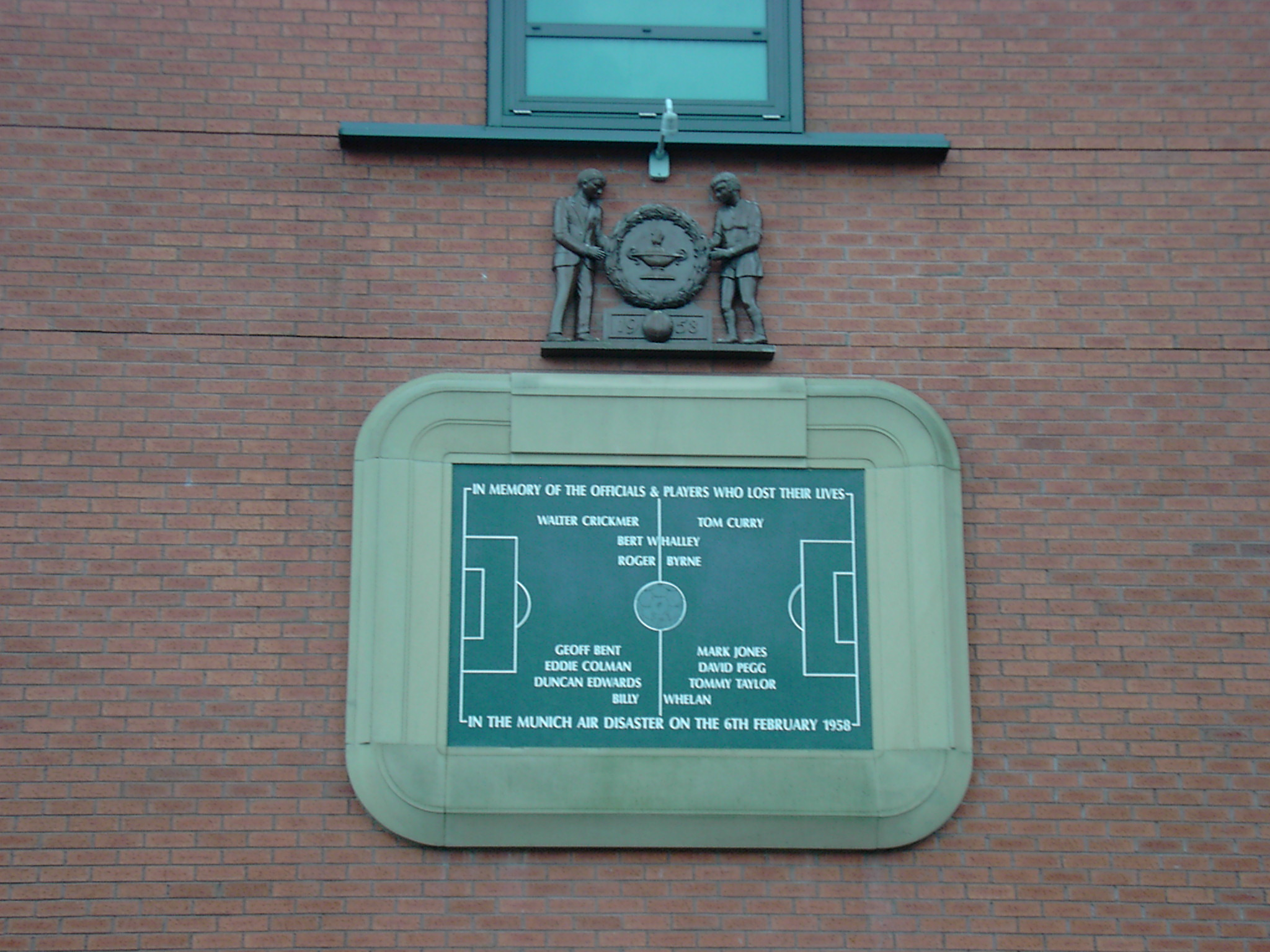
A plaque at Old Trafford in honour of the players who died in the Munich air disaster

The team's chartered plane, an Airspeed Ambassador owned by British European Airways, left Belgrade on 6 February and stopped at Munich to refuel. Takeoff had to be aborted twice because of boost surging, a common problem in the "Elizabethan". The problem was caused by the fuel mixture being too rich, which caused the engines to over-accelerate: this problem was exacerbated by the altitude of the Munich airport.

The pilots were able to control the surging on the third takeoff attempt, but as they reached the V1 "decision speed" (after which it is unsafe to abort takeoff), the airspeed suddenly dropped. The aircraft left the runway, crashed through a fence and into a house. The left wing and the tail were ripped off, while the starboard side of the fuselage hit a fuel tank and exploded. Officially, the cause of the accident was build-up of slush on the runway, which caused the aircraft to lose speed, preventing it from achieving takeoff.

Mark Jones, David Pegg, Roger Byrne (United's captain since 1953), Geoff Bent, Eddie Colman, Liam Whelan, and Tommy Taylor were killed outright, in addition to club secretary Walter Crickmer, and coaches Tom Curry and Bert Whalley. Duncan Edwards, Matt Busby, and Johnny Berry were critically injured; Edwards died fifteen days later. Berry and Jackie Blanchflower survived but never played again. Byrne, Taylor and Edwards were all regular members of the England team, with 70 caps and 21 goals between them, while Pegg, Whelan, Berry and Blanchflower had all received full international recognition for England, the Republic of Ireland or Northern Ireland.

A total of 23 people died as a result of their injuries; among them were four other passengers and two of the crew, as were eight sportswriters including former Manchester City and England goalkeeper Frank Swift. Among the survivors were goalkeeper Harry Gregg, who had only just joined the club from Doncaster Rovers, full-back Bill Foulkes and forward Bobby Charlton.

== Rebuilding ==
Jackie Blanchflower and Johnny Berry were injured to such an extent that their playing careers were over, and Kenny Morgans was never the same player he had been before the crash. Matt Busby himself was in hospital for two months recovering from multiple injuries. Initially his chances of surviving were thought to be no better than 50-50.

While Busby recovered in hospital, his assistant Jimmy Murphy took temporary charge of team affairs (Murphy had not gone to Yugoslavia with the team, as he was managing the Welsh national side in a World Cup qualifier against Israel). United struggled in the League after Munich, winning only one of their last 14 matches and finishing in ninth place. However, they performed well in the FA Cup matches and made it to the final, but lost to Bolton 2–0. At the end of the season, UEFA offered The FA the opportunity to submit both United and the eventual champions Wolves for the 1958–59 European Cup, an unprecedented move, as a tribute to the victims, but the FA declined.

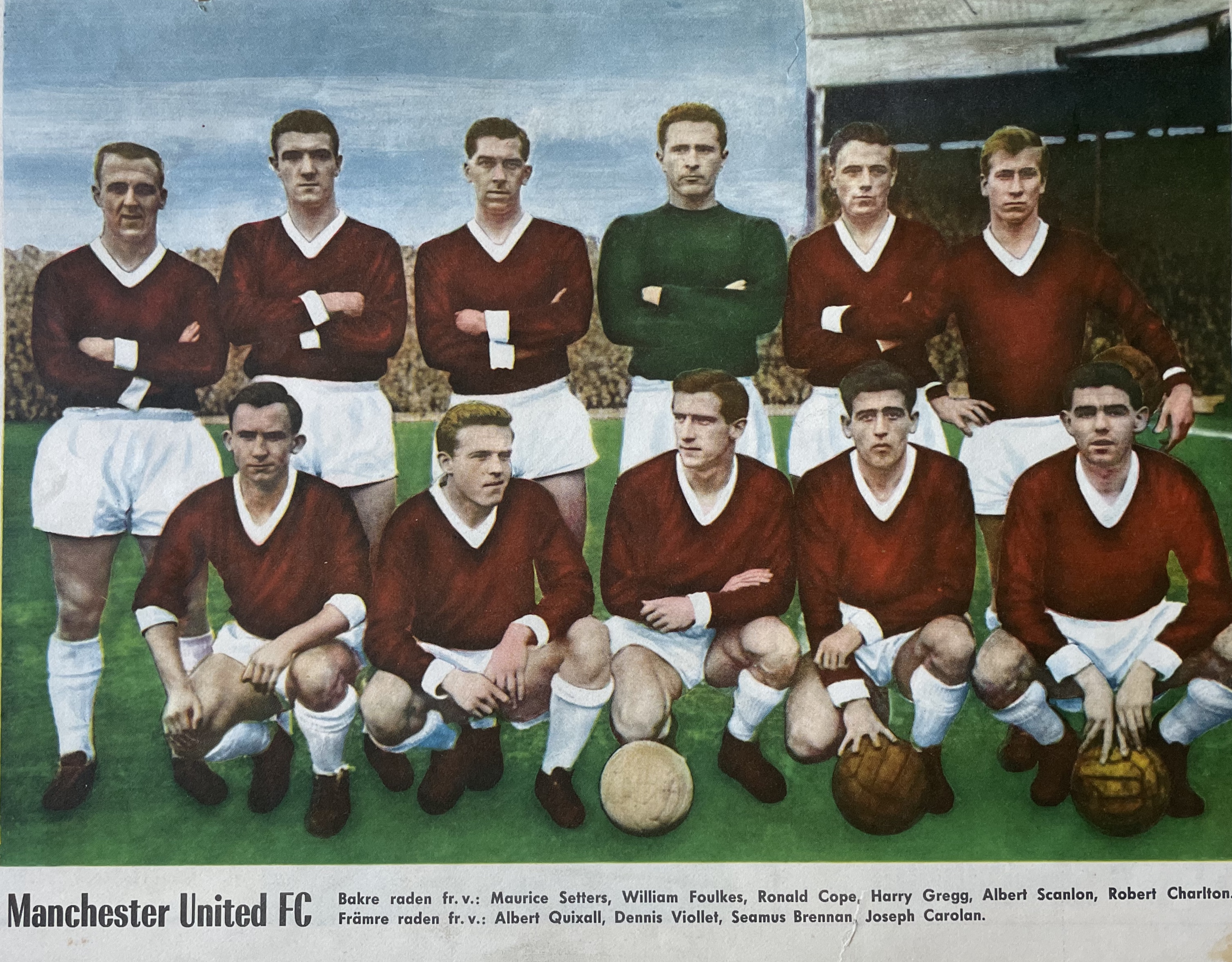
Manchester United F.C. in 1960 – from the left, standing: Maurice Setters, William "Bill" Foulkes (captain), Ronald "Ronnie" Cope, Harry Gregg, Albert Scanlon and Bobby Charlton. Front row from left: Unknown player, Albert Quixall, Dennis Viollet, Seamus "Shay" Brennan and Joseph "Joe" Carolan.

A period of rebuilding followed with several significant signings, including Albert Quixall, Maurice Setters, Denis Law, Paddy Crerand, and Noel Cantwell between 1958 and 1962. Although they were sound long-term investments, the arrival of fresh blood failed to give the club an immediate leg-up in the league. Munich survivors Harry Gregg, Bill Foulkes and Bobby Charlton were all with the club for many years afterwards, while Ray Wood, Albert Scanlon and Kenny Morgans had all been transferred by 1961 and Dennis Viollet was sold to Stoke City in 1962.

The team's form was inconsistent, but despite a poor 19th place in the 1962–63 season, United managed to beat Leicester City 3–1 at Wembley to win the FA Cup.

After the crash, Busby's Babes seemed inappropriate so a new name was sought. English rugby club Salford had toured France in the 1930s wearing red shirts and became known as "The Red Devils". Busby liked the sound of it, so he declared Manchester United should also be known as "The Red Devils" and soon the club began incorporating the devil logo into match programmes and scarves. In 1970, the club badge was redesigned, but now with a devil in the centre holding a pitchfork.

== The mid-Sixties ==
September 1963 saw the debut of 17-year-old forward George Best, completing the "holy trinity" of Charlton, Law and Best that would help United to their successes of the 1960s. In 1963–64 Law scored 46 goals in all competitions. United finished second that season, then won the League in 1964–65 by goal average over a newly promoted Leeds United, who would go on to be one of the dominant sides in English football over the next decade. That season saw United go on a run of 13 wins in 15 games from September–December 1964. The rebuilding was complete: Bobby Charlton and Bill Foulkes were the only Munich survivors in that team, although Harry Gregg was still on the club's payroll despite a serious shoulder injuries, not leaving until the 1966–67 season.

That season was significant in other ways, too, as England were hosting the 1966 World Cup and Old Trafford was among the stadia to be upgraded at the government's expense, with the North Stand being rebuilt into a cantilevered structure. United's players Bobby Charlton and Nobby Stiles played for England in the Final, beating West Germany 4–2. Winger John Connelly was also in England's World Cup squad but was not selected in the team for the final.

United won another league title in 1966–67, going unbeaten in their last 20 games and making sure of top spot by winning 6–1 over West Ham, qualifying them for the European Cup the next season and laying the groundwork for the climactic triumph of that era. They were knocked out of the League Cup at the Second Round stage by Blackpool, who won the Bloomfield Road tie 5–1.

== Champions of Europe (1967–68) ==

1968 European Cup Final starting lineup

The run to the European Cup began easily enough, and the Reds cruised past the Maltese team Hibernians for a 4–0 win on aggregate. A tough, physical series against Sarajevo was next, followed by Górnik Zabrze from Poland. United won 2–1 on aggregate and then came the semi-final - two matches against the mighty Real Madrid. Real played a defensive game in the first leg at Old Trafford, stifling the attacking magic of the Reds. United managed a 1–0 victory, but it was a very small advantage to take into the Bernabéu.

Denis Law was suffering from a knee injury, so Busby decided instead to call up the 36-year-old defender Bill Foulkes, who now played most of his games in the centre of defence rather that on the right. The game started badly for United as Real Madrid ran circles around them, leading 3–1 at half-time, 3–2 on aggregate. United came back strongly after the break and pounded the Real defence to no avail for half an hour until David Sadler levelled the aggregate score. Then Bill Foulkes played the hero as he buried a pass from George Best into the goal. It was the only goal he ever scored in European competition and the last of only nine he would score in nearly 700 appearances for the club.

United were through to the final and faced Benfica at Wembley. In was considered an emotional day with Matt Busby's journey finally coming full circle after the aborted promise of the Busby Babes a decade earlier. It was also considered a testament to Busby's skill in judging talent; the club had only paid transfer fees for two of that day's players.

Bobby Charlton opened the scoring for United, then Jaime Graça equalised. Benfica piled on the pressure in the dying minutes and it took a brilliant save from Alex Stepney to deny Eusébio the winning goal. United managed to hold out until extra time, then George Best finally broke free of the stifling marking of the Benfica defence and scored. Benfica were reeling and Brian Kidd, celebrating his 19th birthday, scored a header. Bobby Charlton finished off Benfica with a high shot for a 4–1 victory and United became the first English team to win the European Cup.

Matt Busby would later be knighted for his accomplishments, as well as being awarded the Freedom of Manchester.

== End of an era (1968–69) ==
As the European champions, Manchester United faced off against Estudiantes de La Plata, the South American champions, in the 1968 Intercontinental Cup. Estudiantes won the series after a 1–0 win in Buenos Aires's La Bombonera and a 1–1 draw at Old Trafford. This became the first, and so far only, time Manchester United failed to win a title contested at their home ground. In the European Cup, United lost to Milan in the semi-finals, after a Law goal that clearly crossed the line was disallowed in the second leg at Old Trafford, leaving United 1–0 winners on the night but 1–2 losers on aggregate. The season ended with Busby moving on to become General Manager. He had announced his intention to resign as team manager on 14 January 1969, and trainer Wilf McGuinness agreed to take over control of the first team.

By May 1969, the United squad was rather aged. Foulkes, whose appearances were now limited and who would retire the following season, was now 37. Shay Brennan and Bobby Charlton were now in their early thirties and Denis Law was just months short of his 30th birthday, although the squad did include some impressive younger players including 20-year-old forward Brian Kidd and new signing Willie Morgan, an acquisition from Burnley just after the European Cup victory. Alex Stepney, 26, was now United's regular goalkeeper, having been signed from Chelsea three years earlier to replace Harry Gregg.

== See also ==
- History of Manchester United F.C. (1878–1945)
- History of Manchester United F.C. (1969–1986)
- History of Manchester United F.C. (1986–2013)
