= Tabram =

Tabram is a surname. Notable people with the surname include:

- Billy Tabram (1909-1992), Welsh footballer
- Martha Tabram (1849-1888), English murder victim
