= Fred Mills (footballer) =

English footballer

Personal information
- Full name: Frederick Mills
- Date of birth: 17 August 1911
- Place of birth: Hanley, England
- Date of death: 5 December 1944 (aged 34)
- Place of death: Blerick, German-occupied Netherlands
- Height: 5 ft 8 in (1.73 m)
- Positions: Right-half; inside right

Youth career
- Middleport

Senior career*
Years	Team	Apps	(Gls)
1932–1934	Port Vale	73	(4)
1934–1939	Leeds United	67	(2)
Total		140	(6)
- * Club domestic league appearances and goals

Frederick Mills (17 August 1911 – 5 December 1944) was an English footballer who played at right-half for Port Vale and Leeds United throughout the 1930s. He was killed during World War II.

== Early and personal life ==
Frederick Mills born on 18 August 1911; he was the son of Frederick and Ann Mills of Hanley, Stoke-on-Trent. He worked at a local pottery firm.

== Career ==
Mills initially joined Port Vale from Middleport as an amateur in April 1932. He signed professional forms the next month. He scored his first goal in professional football on 10 December 1932, in a 3–1 win over Bradford Park Avenue at the Old Recreation Ground. He finished the 1932–33 season with three goals in 37 appearances. He scored twice in 37 Second Division games in the 1933–34 campaign. He was sold to Leeds United in June 1934, as the club were running short of money.

He made his debut for Leeds at centre-forward before switching to inside-right. After 16 games of the 1934–35 season he broke his leg, causing him to miss the entire 1935–36 campaign. He played 32 times at wing-half in the 1936–37 season, and scored twice in 12 First Division appearances in 1937–38. He played eight games in 1938–39, but left Elland Road after the outbreak of World War II.

== Military service ==
Mills joined the 6th Battalion King's Shropshire Light Infantry, a new unit formed in 1940, which was converted into 181st Field Regiment, Royal Artillery in 1942. Gunner Mills was known to his comrades as 'Paddy' and was a member of the regimental football team. On 5 December 1944, after the fighting for Blerick in the Netherlands, the regiment was in convoy and halted in a taped route through a minefield. "The story goes that Paddy had found most of a German Machine Gun and was keen to complete his trophy … Suddenly Paddy was heard to shout 'That's just what I'm looking for' or words to that effect. He jumped out of the lorry, and into the minefield. It's not clear whether he stepped on a mine, or the box he picked up was booby-trapped, but Paddy was killed instantly." Recordedly aged 36, he left a widow, Lucy and 2 month year old daughter Pauline, and is buried in Venray War Cemetery.

== Career statistics ==
Appearances and goals by club, season and competition
Season	Club	League			FA Cup		Total	
Season	Club	Division	Apps	Goals	Apps	Goals	Apps	Goals
Port Vale	1932–33	Second Division	36	2	1	1	37	3
Port Vale	1933–34	Second Division	37	2	1	0	38	2
Port Vale	Total		73	4	2	1	75	5
Leeds United	1934–35	First Division	16	2	0	0	16	2
Leeds United	1935–36	First Division	0	0	0	0	0	0
Leeds United	1936–37	First Division	31	0	1	0	32	0
Leeds United	1937–38	First Division	12	0	2	0	14	0
Leeds United	1938–39	First Division	8	0	0	0	8	0
Leeds United	Total		67	2	3	0	70	2
Career total			140	6	5	1	145	7

== See also ==
- List of footballers killed during World War II

== Bibliography ==
- Kent, Jeff (1996). Port Vale Personalities. Witan Books. ISBN 0-9529152-0-0.
- Neal, Don (2001). Guns and bugles : the story of the 6th Bn K.S.L.I-181st Field Regiment R.A., 1940-1946. Studley: Brewin Books. ISBN 1-85858-192-3.
