= Robert G. Davies =

English footballer

Robert Davies
Personal information
- Full name: Robert George Davies
- Place of birth: Oswestry, England
- Height: 5 ft 7 1/2 in (1.71 m)
- Position: Inside right

Youth career
- Stoke City
- Stoke St.Peter's

Senior career*
Years	Team	Apps	(Gls)
1931–1934	Port Vale	7	(0)
1934–1936	Torquay United	5	(1)
Total		12	(1)
- * Club domestic league appearances and goals

Robert George Davies was a footballer who played as an inside right in the English Football League for Port Vale and then Torquay United in the early 1930s.

== Career ==
Davies played for Stoke City and Stoke St.Peter's before joining Port Vale as an amateur in October 1931, turning professional in August 1932. He played five Second Division games in 1932–33 and two games in 1933–34, before leaving the Old Recreation Ground on a free transfer in May 1934. He moved on to Torquay United and made five Third Division South appearances for Torquay, scoring one goal, with his last appearance coming in the 1935–36 season.

== Career statistics ==
Appearances and goals by club, season and competition
Club	Season	League			FA Cup		Other		Total	
Club	Season	Division	Apps	Goals	Apps	Goals	Apps	Goals	Apps	Goals
Port Vale	1932–33	Second Division	5	0	0	0	0	0	5	0
Port Vale	1933–34	Second Division	2	0	0	0	0	0	2	0
Port Vale	Total		7	0	0	0	0	0	7	0
Torquay United	1934–35	Third Division South	1	0	0	0	0	0	1	0
Torquay United	1935–36	Third Division South	4	1	0	0	1	0	5	1
Torquay United	Total		5	1	0	0	1	0	6	1
Career total			12	1	0	0	1	0	13	1
