= Peter Cunningham (footballer) =

Scottish footballer

Personal information
- Full name: Peter Cunningham
- Date of birth: 13 July 1906
- Place of birth: Glasgow, Scotland
- Date of death: 3 September 1934 (aged 28)
- Place of death: Kirkintilloch, East Dunbartonshire, Scotland
- Height: 5 ft 9 1/2 in (1.77 m)
- Position: Centre-forward

Senior career*
| Years | Team | Apps | (Gls) |
- Clyde
| 1930–1931 | Partick Thistle | | |
| 1931–1932 | Cork City | | |
| 1932–1933 | Barnsley | 14 | (17) |
| 1933 | Port Vale | 2 | (0) |
| 1933–1934 | Crewe Alexandra | 15 | (13) |
- * Club domestic league appearances and goals

Peter Cunningham (13 July 1906 – 3 September 1934) was a Scottish footballer who played as a centre-forward for Clyde, Partick Thistle, Cork City, Barnsley, Port Vale, and Crewe Alexandra.

== Career ==
Cunningham played for Clyde before he joined Donald Turner's Partick Thistle on 7 August 1930. He scored five goals in eight games for the Jags. He moved on to Cork City and Barnsley, before joining Port Vale in May 1933. He played just two Second Division games before leaving the Old Recreation Ground and dropping down to the Third Division North to play for Crewe Alexandra in November 1933. He died less than a year later on 3 September 1934, at the age of 28.

== Career statistics ==
Appearances and goals by club, season and competition
| Club | Season | League | | | FA Cup | | Other | | Total | |
| Club | Season | Division | Apps | Goals | Apps | Goals | Apps | Goals | Apps | Goals |
|---|---|---|---|---|---|---|---|---|---|---|
| Barnsley | 1932–33 | Third Division North | 14 | 17 | 0 | 0 | 0 | 0 | 14 | 17 |
| Port Vale | 1933–34 | Second Division | 2 | 0 | 0 | 0 | 0 | 0 | 2 | 0 |
| Crewe Alexandra | 1933–34 | Third Division North | 15 | 13 | 1 | 0 | 1 | 2 | 17 | 15 |
