= Ormond Jones =

Welsh footballer

Personal information
- Full name: Ormond Henry Jones
- Date of birth: 24 August 1910
- Place of birth: Towyn, Wales
- Date of death: 10 April 1972 (aged 61)
- Place of death: Bilston, England
- Height: 6 ft 0 in (1.83 m)
- Position: Goalkeeper

Youth career
- Hickman's Town
- 1928–1930: Bilston United

Senior career*
Years	Team	Apps	(Gls)
- Wednesbury Town
1931	Stoke City	0	(0)
1932–1933	Yeovil & Petters United		
1933–1934	Port Vale	14	(0)
1934–1936	Norwich City	9	(0)
1936	Watford	8	(0)
1936–1937	Mansfield Town	14	(0)
1938–1939	Yarmouth Town		
Total		45+	(0)
- * Club domestic league appearances and goals

Ormond Henry Jones (24 August 1910 – 10 April 1972) was a Welsh footballer who played as a goalkeeper for Wednesbury Town, Stoke City, Yeovil & Petters United, Port Vale, Watford, and Mansfield Town.

== Career ==
Jones played for Hickman's Town, Bilston United, Wednesbury Town, Stoke City (on trial in March 1931), Blackpool (on trial) and Yeovil & Petters United, before joining Port Vale in May 1933. He was appointed first-team keeper ahead of Allan Todd until October 1933, when he contracted tonsillitis and lost his place. He played a total of 14 Second Division games in the 1933–34 season. He was given a free transfer away from the Old Recreation Ground in May 1934 and later had two spells with Norwich City. He signed with Watford in January 1936 following injuries to Jim McLaren and John McHugh. He played eight Third Division South games before he was released at the end of the 1935–36 season. He later played for Mansfield Town and Yarmouth Town.

== Career statistics ==
Appearances and goals by club, season and competition
Club	Season	League			FA Cup		Total	
Club	Season	Division	Apps	Goals	Apps	Goals	Apps	Goals
Port Vale	1933–34	Second Division	14	0	0	0	14	0
Norwich City	1934–35	Second Division	9	0	1	0	10	0
Watford	1935–36	Third Division South	8	0	0	0	8	0
Mansfield Town	1936–37	Third Division North	14	0	2	0	16	0
