= Jack Vickers =

English footballer

Personal information
- Full name: John Vickers
- Date of birth: 7 August 1908
- Place of birth: Auckland Park, Bishop Auckland, England
- Date of death: 24 September 1980 (aged 72)
- Place of death: West Auckland, England
- Height: 5 ft 8 1/2 in (1.74 m)
- Position: Full-back

Youth career
- Eldon Juniors

Senior career*
Years	Team	Apps	(Gls)
- Bishop Auckland
1928–1929	Hull City	2	(0)
1929–1930	Darlington	14	(0)
1930–1932	Doncaster Rovers	39	(2)
1932–1933	Charlton Athletic	10	(0)
1933–1936	Port Vale	73	(0)
1936–1937	Newport County	19	(0)
1937–1938	South Shields		
1938–1939	Hartlepools United	0	(0)
1939	Stockton		
- * Club domestic league appearances and goals

John Vickers (7 August 1908 – 24 September 1980) was an English footballer. He played in the English Football League for Hull City, Darlington, Doncaster Rovers, Charlton Athletic, Port Vale and Newport County. He also played matches for Bishop Auckland, South Shields and Stockton.

== Career ==
Vickers played for local club Bishop Auckland in the Northern League until a successful trial at Hull City in March 1928 saw him sign professional terms with the Tigers. He played two Second Division games at the end of the 1928–29 season, away at Swansea Town and at home to Nottingham Forest. He spent the 1929–30 season with Darlington, playing 15 Third Division North games. Vickers joined Doncaster Rovers in July 1930 and featured 39 times across the 1930–31 and 1931–32 campaigns. He departed Belle Vue and signed with Charlton Athletic, playing ten Second Division matches in the 1932–33 season. He was sold to Port Vale for £200 in May 1933. He played 32 Second Division matches in 1933–34 and 26 league games in 1934–35, but lost his first-team spot in September 1935, and made just 15 league appearances in 1935–36. He did though feature in the FA Cup giant-killing over First Division giants Sunderland at the Old Recreation Ground on 13 January. Vickers was released in April 1936, having played a total of 73 league games for the "Valiants". He then moved on to Newport County, featuring in 19 Third Division South games during the 1936–37 campaign. Vickers saw out the decade in the North Eastern League with South Shields and Stockton.

== Career statistics ==
Appearances and goals by club, season and competition
Club	Season	League			FA Cup		Other		Total	
Club	Season	Division	Apps	Goals	Apps	Goals	Apps	Goals	Apps	Goals
Hull City	1928–29	Second Division	2	0	0	0	0	0	2	0
Darlington	1929–30	Third Division North	14	0	1	0	0	0	15	0
Doncaster Rovers	1930–31	Third Division North	22	2	0	0	0	0	22	2
Doncaster Rovers	1931–32	Third Division North	17	0	0	0	0	0	17	0
Doncaster Rovers	Total		39	2	0	0	0	0	39	2
Charlton Athletic	1932–33	Second Division	10	0	0	0	0	0	10	0
Port Vale	1933–34	Second Division	32	0	1	0	0	0	33	0
Port Vale	1934–35	Second Division	26	0	1	0	0	0	27	0
Port Vale	1935–36	Second Division	15	0	3	0	0	0	18	0
Port Vale	Total		73	0	5	0	0	0	78	0
Newport County	1936–37	Third Division South	19	0	2	0	1	0	22	0
Hartlepools United	1938–39	Third Division North	0	0	0	0	0	0	0	0
Career total			157	2	8	0	1	0	166	2
