= Allan Todd =

Scottish footballer

Personal information
- Full name: Allan Calderwood McKinstrey Todd
- Date of birth: 5 October 1910
- Place of birth: Orwell, Kinross, Scotland
- Date of death: 1975 (aged 64–65)
- Place of death: Darlington, England
- Height: 5 ft 11 1/2 in (1.82 m)
- Position: Goalkeeper

Youth career
- Wellesley

Senior career*
Years	Team	Apps	(Gls)
- Leith Athletic
- Cowdenbeath
1933–1937	Port Vale	79	(0)
1937–1939	Nottingham Forest	17	(0)
1939–1940	Darlington	0	(0)
- * Club domestic league appearances and goals

Allan Calderwood McKinstrey Todd (5 October 1910 – 1975) was a Scottish footballer who played as a goalkeeper. He played for Scottish clubs Leith Athletic and Cowdenbeath, and represented English sides Port Vale, Nottingham Forest, and Darlington.

== Career ==
Todd played for Wellesley, Leith Athletic and Cowdenbeath, before joining English side Port Vale in October 1932. He featured nine times for the "Valiants" in 1932–33, but remained at the Old Recreation Ground whilst rivals Jock Leckie and Ben Davies both departed. He played 29 times in 1933–34, beating off competition from Ormond Jones. However, he played just once in 1935–36, as the club suffered relegation with John Potts between the sticks. Todd played 39 times in the Third Division North in 1936–37, but refused a new contract with Vale and was given a free transfer to Nottingham Forest in exchange for Arthur Masters. After leaving the City Ground, Todd later played for Darlington.

== Career statistics ==
Appearances and goals by club, season and competition
Club	Season	League			FA Cup		Other		Total	
Club	Season	Division	Apps	Goals	Apps	Goals	Apps	Goals	Apps	Goals
Port Vale	1932–33	Second Division	9	0	0	0	0	0	9	0
Port Vale	1933–34	Second Division	28	0	1	0	0	0	29	0
Port Vale	1934–35	Second Division	2	0	0	0	0	0	2	0
Port Vale	1935–36	Second Division	1	0	0	0	0	0	1	0
Port Vale	1936–37	Third Division North	39	0	0	0	4	0	43	0
Port Vale	Total		79	0	1	0	4	0	84	0
Nottingham Forest	1937–38	Second Division	5	0	2	0	0	0	7	0
Nottingham Forest	1938–39	Second Division	12	0	2	0	0	0	14	0
Nottingham Forest	Total		17	0	4	0	0	0	21	0
Darlington	1939–40		0	0	0	0	3	0	3	0
Career total			95	0	5	0	7	0	107	0
