= Sydney Dickinson =

English footballer

Personal information
- Full name: Sydney Dickinson
- Date of birth: 17 August 1906
- Place of birth: Nottingham, England
- Date of death: 2 February 1984 (aged 77)
- Place of death: Radcliffe-on-Trent, England
- Position: Half-back

Youth career
- Dale Rovers

Senior career*
Years	Team	Apps	(Gls)
1923–1925	Nottingham Forest	0	(0)
1925–1926	Mansfield Town		
1926–1933	Bradford Park Avenue	156	(19)
1933–1934	Port Vale	12	(2)
1934–1935	Lincoln City	14	(3)
- Grantham
Total		182	(24)
- * Club domestic league appearances and goals

Sydney Dickinson (17 August 1906 – 2 February 1984) was an English footballer who played at half-back for Nottingham Forest, Mansfield Town, Bradford Park Avenue, Port Vale, Lincoln City, and Grantham. Football historian Jeff Kent described his tackling abilities as "tenacious".

== Career ==
Dickinson played for Dale Rovers, Nottingham Forest, Mansfield Town and Bradford Park Avenue, before being signed to Port Vale in November 1933 for "a substantial fee". Despite scoring goals against both Bradford clubs at Valley Parade and the Horsfall Stadium, he was only utilized in twelve Second Division games before being released from the Old Recreation Ground at the end of the season. He moved on to Lincoln City and Grantham.

== Career statistics ==
Appearances and goals by club, season and competition
Club	Season	League			FA Cup		Total	
Club	Season	Division	Apps	Goals	Apps	Goals	Apps	Goals
Nottingham Forest	1923–24	First Division	0	0	0	0	0	0
Bradford Park Avenue	1926–27	Third Division North	14	0	0	0	14	0
Bradford Park Avenue	1927–28	Third Division North	18	0	0	0	18	0
Bradford Park Avenue	1928–29	Second Division	20	2	3	0	23	2
Bradford Park Avenue	1929–30	Second Division	15	1	3	0	18	1
Bradford Park Avenue	1930–31	Second Division	25	7	2	0	27	7
Bradford Park Avenue	1931–32	Second Division	32	8	3	1	35	9
Bradford Park Avenue	1932–33	Second Division	30	1	2	1	32	2
Bradford Park Avenue	1933–34	Second Division	2	0	0	0	2	0
Bradford Park Avenue	Total		156	19	13	2	169	21
Port Vale	1933–34	Second Division	12	2	0	0	12	2
Lincoln City	1934–35	Third Division North	14	3	1	0	15	3
Career total			182	24	14	2	196	26
