= Ken Gunn =

Scottish footballer

Personal information
- Full name: Kenneth Gunn
- Date of birth: 9 April 1909
- Place of birth: Newmains, Scotland
- Date of death: 15 August 1991 (aged 82)
- Place of death: Northampton, England
- Height: 5 ft 10 in (1.78 m)
- Position: Utility player

Youth career
- 1926–1927: Newmains

Senior career*
Years	Team	Apps	(Gls)
1927–1933	Swansea Town	95	(35)
1933–1937	Port Vale	134	(10)
1937–1939	Northampton Town	74	(1)
Total		303	(46)
- * Club domestic league appearances and goals

Kenneth Gunn (9 April 1909 – 15 August 1991) was a Scottish footballer who was a utility player for Swansea Town, Port Vale, and Northampton Town.

== Career ==
Gunn played for Newmains and Swansea Town before joining Second Division rivals Port Vale, along with Billy Tabram, for a £400 fee in May 1933. He quickly made an impact at his new club, scoring both Vale's goals in a 2–1 win over Southampton at the Old Recreation Ground on 2 September. He went on to score eight goals in 39 appearances in the 1933–34 season. He scored once in 31 league games in the 1934–35 campaign. Gunn scored once in 28 games in 1935–36, as the club suffered relegation. He appeared 40 times in the 1936–37 season, as Vale struggled to adapt to life in the Third Division North. He was transferred to Northampton Town of the Third Division South in May 1937, and later guested for Portsmouth during World War II.

== Career statistics ==
Appearances and goals by club, season and competition
Club	Season	League			FA Cup		Other		Total	
Club	Season	Division	Apps	Goals	Apps	Goals	Apps	Goals	Apps	Goals
Swansea Town	1927–28	Second Division	8	3	0	0	0	0	8	3
Swansea Town	1928–29	Second Division	24	7	1	0	0	0	25	7
Swansea Town	1929–30	Second Division	18	9	1	0	0	0	19	9
Swansea Town	1930–31	Second Division	7	2	0	0	0	0	7	2
Swansea Town	1931–32	Second Division	34	14	1	1	0	0	35	15
Swansea Town	1932–33	Second Division	4	0	0	0	0	0	4	0
Swansea Town	Total		95	35	3	1	0	0	98	36
Port Vale	1933–34	Second Division	38	8	1	0	0	0	39	8
Port Vale	1934–35	Second Division	31	1	0	0	0	0	31	1
Port Vale	1935–36	Second Division	28	1	0	0	0	0	28	1
Port Vale	1936–37	Third Division North	37	0	0	0	3	0	40	0
Port Vale	Total		134	10	1	0	3	0	138	10
Northampton Town	1937–38	Third Division South	40	0	1	0	1	0	42	0
Northampton Town	1938–39	Third Division South	34	1	1	0	2	0	37	1
Northampton Town	Total		74	1	2	0	3	0	79	1
Career total			303	46	6	1	6	0	315	47
