= James Brown (footballer, born 1906) =

Scottish footballer

Personal information
- Full name: James Brown
- Date of birth: 24 June 1906
- Place of birth: Motherwell, Scotland
- Height: 5 ft 9 in (1.75 m)
- Position: Right half

Youth career
- Belhavenock

Senior career*
Years	Team	Apps	(Gls)
- Maryhill
- Wishaw Juniors
1926–1927	East Fife	9	(0)
1927–1935	Burnley	228	(5)
1935–1939	Manchester United	102	(1)
1939–1940	Bradford Park Avenue	14	(0)
- * Club domestic league appearances and goals

James Brown (born 1906; date of death unknown) was a Scottish footballer who played at right half-back. Born in Leith, Edinburgh, he spent most of his football career playing in England, for Burnley, Manchester United and Bradford Park Avenue.

== Career ==
Born in Leith, Brown was orphaned at the age of 7, along with his five brothers. He entered the coal-mining industry while still at school, but after becoming a Scottish schoolboy international, he decided to pursue a career in football. After playing for Belhavenock, Maryhill and Wishaw Juniors in the Scottish Junior League, he joined Scottish Second Division club East Fife for the 1926–27 season. After a successful season in which his team reached the final of the Scottish Cup, he earned a move to England, where he was signed by First Division side Burnley.

Burnley narrowly avoided relegation to the Second Division in Brown's first two seasons with the club, but they were unable to do so again in 1929–30. Two years later, Brown was named as the club's captain. However, in June 1935, he was signed by Manchester United for a fee of £1,000. In his eight years with Burnley, Brown scored five goals in 228 league appearances. He made his debut for Manchester United in a 3–1 defeat away to Plymouth Argyle on 31 August 1935. He was the club's starting right-half and captain for most of the season, missing just two matches as Manchester United finished top of the Second Division to earn promotion to the top flight.

He continued as the club's first-choice right-half for the next two seasons as they were relegated back to the Second Division and immediately promoted again. Having already lost the captaincy to George Roughton in 1937, Brown lost his place in the team to George Gladwin at the start of the 1938–39 season, before Jack Warner took over in November 1938, having been signed the previous summer. This meant that Brown made just three appearances for Manchester United in 1938–39 and he was allowed to leave for Bradford Park Avenue in February 1939. He made 13 appearances for Bradford Park Avenue before the end of the season and another in 1939–40 before league football was suspended due to the Second World War, during which he retired from football.

Sporting positions
Preceded by Bill McKay	Manchester United captain 1935–1937	Succeeded by George Roughton
