= Richard Twiss (footballer) =

English footballer

Personal information
- Full name: Richard Twiss
- Date of birth: 11 November 1909
- Place of birth: Ashton-in-Makerfield, England
- Date of death: 1970 (aged 60–61)
- Place of death: Ashton-in-Makerfield, England
- Height: 5 ft 7 in (1.70 m)
- Position: Half-back

Youth career
- Chorley

Senior career*
Years	Team	Apps	(Gls)
1932–1933	Wolverhampton Wanderers	0	(0)
1933–1934	Port Vale	1	(0)
1934–1939	Bournemouth & Boscombe Athletic	4	(0)
Total		5	(0)
- * Club domestic league appearances and goals

Richard Twiss (11 November 1909 – 1970) was an English footballer who played for Chorley, Wolverhampton Wanderers, Port Vale, and Bournemouth & Boscombe Athletic.

== Career ==
Twiss played for Chorley and Wolverhampton Wanderers before joining Port Vale in August 1933. His only Second Division appearance came at centre-forward in a 2–1 loss to Hull City at Anlaby Road on 2 April 1934. He was handed a free transfer away from the Old Recreation Ground the following month, at the end of the 1933–34 season. He moved on to Bournemouth & Boscombe Athletic.

== Career statistics ==
Appearances and goals by club, season and competition
Club	Season	League			FA Cup		Other		Total	
Club	Season	Division	Apps	Goals	Apps	Goals	Apps	Goals	Apps	Goals
Wolverhampton Wanderers	1932–33	First Division	0	0	0	0	0	0	0	0
Port Vale	1933–34	Second Division	1	0	0	0	0	0	1	0
Bournemouth & Boscombe Athletic	1934–35	Third Division South	1	0	0	0	0	0	1	0
Bournemouth & Boscombe Athletic	1935–36	Third Division South	3	0	0	0	1	0	4	0
Bournemouth & Boscombe Athletic	1936–37	Third Division South	0	0	0	0	0	0	0	0
Bournemouth & Boscombe Athletic	1937–38	Third Division South	0	0	0	0	0	0	0	0
Bournemouth & Boscombe Athletic	1938–39	Third Division South	0	0	0	0	1	0	1	0
Bournemouth & Boscombe Athletic	Total		4	0	0	0	2	0	6	0
Career total			5	0	0	0	2	0	7	0
