= Billy Tabram =

Welsh footballer (1909–1992)

Personal information
- Full name: William David Tabram
- Date of birth: 19 January 1909
- Place of birth: Swansea, Wales
- Date of death: 15 April 1992 (aged 83)
- Place of death: Swansea, Wales
- Height: 5 ft 10 in (1.78 m)
- Positions: Centre-half; wing half; inside forward

Youth career
- Crown Mission

Senior career*
Years	Team	Apps	(Gls)
1929–1933	Swansea Town	20	(0)
1933–1934	Port Vale	35	(1)
1934–1937	Hull City	106	(5)
1937–1941	South Shields		
- * Club domestic league appearances and goals

William David Tabram (19 January 1909 – 15 April 1992) was a Welsh footballer, noted for his great technical skill. He played for Swansea Town, Port Vale, Hull City, and South Shields in the 1930s. He made 167 appearances in the English Football League and later won the North Eastern League with South Shields. His brother, Phil, also played professional football for Swansea Town.

== Career ==
Tabram played for local side Crown Mission before joining Swansea Town in 1929 after an unsuccessful trial with Preston North End. He played 20 Second Division matches for the Swans in four seasons. He joined Port Vale, along with Ken Gunn, for £400 in March 1933. He played 35 Second Division games in the 1933–34 season, and scored one goal in a 3–0 win over Bury at Gigg Lane on 11 September. He left the Old Recreation Ground when he was sold to Hull City in May 1934. He was appointed as club captain by manager Jack Hill and made 36 consecutive appearances in the 1934–35 season, missing just four fixtures in total. He played at centre-half and a wing-half in the 1935–36 relegation season under both Jack Hill and David Menzies. New manager Ernest Blackburn preferred to play Tabram at inside forward in the 1936–37 season, from where he scored five goals in 35 Third Division North appearances. In June 1937, Tabram joined phoenix club South Shields, helping them to win the North Eastern League title in 1938–39.

== Career statistics ==
Appearances and goals by club, season and competition
Club	Season	League			FA Cup		Other		Total	
Club	Season	Division	Apps	Goals	Apps	Goals	Apps	Goals	Apps	Goals
Swansea Town	1929–30	Second Division	4	0	0	0	—		4	0
Swansea Town	1930–31	Second Division	4	0	0	0	—		4	0
Swansea Town	1931–32	Second Division	10	0	0	0	—		10	0
Swansea Town	1932–33	Second Division	2	0	1	0	—		3	0
Swansea Town	Total		20	0	1	0	0	0	21	0
Port Vale	1933–34	Second Division	35	1	1	0	—		36	1
Hull City	1934–35	Second Division	38	0	1	0	—		39	0
Hull City	1935–36	Second Division	33	0	1	0	—		34	0
Hull City	1936–37	Third Division North	35	5	1	0	1	0	37	5
Hull City	Total		106	5	3	0	1	0	110	5
Career total			161	6	5	0	1	0	167	6

== Honours ==
South Shields

- North Eastern League: 1938–39
