= History of Manchester United F.C. (1969–1986) =

History of an English football club

Following an eighth-place finish in the 1969–70 season and a poor start to the 1970–71 season, Wilf McGuinness was sacked as manager of Manchester United in December 1970 after just 18 months in charge. Matt Busby returned to the manager's position on a temporary basis, and McGuinness returned to his position as reserve team coach.

In June 1971, having failed in attempts to lure Jock Stein and also Don Revie to Old Trafford, the United board appointed Frank O'Farrell as manager. O'Farrell's reign started well, with United re-emerging as title contenders in the first half of the 1971-72 season, but slumped in the second half of the season to finish eighth. O'Farrell was sacked in December 1972, following a 5-0 defeat at Crystal Palace and with United in danger of relegation from the First Division for the first time since the 1930s. Docherty saved Manchester United from relegation that season, only to see them relegated in 1974.

United's first team squad was being radically overhauled during the first two years of Docherty's reign. Denis Law had been given a free transfer in the summer of 1973 and Bobby Charlton had retired, with George Best repeatedly going AWOL and making his final appearance for the club halfway through the relegation season. Younger players including Stuart Pearson, Steve Coppell, Lou Macari and captain Martin Buchan were establishing themselves as key players in a revamped squad. The team won promotion at the first attempt, as Second Division champions, and reached the FA Cup final in 1976, but were defeated by Southampton, and also finished an impressive third in the league. They reached the final again in 1977, beating Liverpool 2–1. Docherty was dismissed shortly afterwards, following the revelation of his affair with the club physiotherapist's wife.

Dave Sexton, first approached to take over at Old Trafford back in 1971 following the departure of Wilf McGuinness, accepted the offer to replace Docherty as manager in the summer of 1977. Despite expensive major signings, including Joe Jordan, Gordon McQueen, Gary Bailey and Ray Wilkins, the team failed to add any silverware in Sexton's four seasons as manager. They came close twice, losing to Arsenal in the 1979 FA Cup final, and finishing runners-up to Liverpool in the league a year later. In the autumn of 1980, Sexton signed United's first million-pound player - Nottingham Forest striker Garry Birtles - but the new signing proved to be a major disappointment and was unable to reignite United's season 1980-81 season, which ended with an eighth-place finish despite the final seven league games all being victories.

Sexton was dismissed in May 1981, leaving the United board to search for its fifth new manager in just over a decade. He was replaced by Ron Atkinson, who quickly began rebuilding the squad, including paying a British record transfer fee of £1.5million to sign midfielder Bryan Robson from West Bromwich Albion. Robson would soon be named captain of the United first team and would go on to help the club win a string of trophies under Atkinson and his eventual successor Alex Ferguson. Under Atkinson, Manchester United never finished outside the top four in the five full seasons he took charge, also winning the FA Cup twice, first beating Brighton in 1983 following a replay, and then winning the 1985 final against Everton, in which young forward Norman Whiteside scored the only goal of the game. In the autumn of 1985, Atkinson finally appeared to be on the brink of bringing the league title back to Old Trafford after an absence of nearly 20 years, as United won their opening 10 league games and were unbeaten from their first 15, but their form declined during the second half of the season and they finished fourth. That summer, the club's top scorer Mark Hughes was sold to FC Barcelona. The following November, with the club in the bottom four of the First Division, Atkinson was dismissed.

== Post-Busby years ==
Wilf McGuinness, the reserve team coach, was promoted to take Matt Busby's place as manager. He had been associated with the club since joining them as a player in the mid 1950s but he quickly faltered in the footsteps of the great man, and was not helped by Busby's presence in the background. United were an ageing side in need of refreshment, a circumstance McGuinness was unfortunate to come across. The club coped well enough in his first season in charge, managing an improved finish of 8th place compared to 11th place in Busby's final season. However, the cracks showed the following season, as the team floundered near the bottom of the table, and a League Cup elimination at the hands of Aston Villa, who at the time were mid-table in the Third Division, led to McGuinness being demoted back to his old reserve team position, and he left the club altogether shortly afterwards.

Busby returned to the manager's seat on a temporary basis and pulled the team well clear of relegation, eventually matching the previous year's 8th-place finish. Frank O'Farrell of Leicester City became the club's new manager in the 1971 close season, after unsuccessful approaches for Jock Stein of Celtic, Don Revie of Leeds United and Dave Sexton of Chelsea. Despite starting the 1971–72 season well and raising hope that O'Farrell would be a good successor to Busby, a run of seven defeats from 1 January meant they were to finish in eighth place for the third successive year – a dismal showing for a club who had appeared capable of winning the title for at least the first half of the season. However, the season did see the signing of 22-year-old Aberdeen defender Martin Buchan, who would play a key role in later successes for United.

At this time, George Best was becoming a problem, continually flouting the rules and getting into various disciplinary troubles. At the end of the 1971–72 season, one day short of his 26th birthday, he announced his retirement, only to turn back on his decision and announce his intention to play again within days.

While Best's erratic behaviour didn't help, United continued to struggle, opening the 1972–73 season with a disastrous nine matches without a win. Following a 4–1 defeat to Tottenham Hotspur on 28 October 1972, chairman Louis Edwards planned to sack O'Farrell and made an audacious move for former Manchester City manager Joe Mercer, but O'Farrell was away on a scouting mission on the day Edwards intended to sack him, and the 58-year-old Mercer (who was to retire from football within two years) turned the offer down anyway.

United's form briefly improved after this, allowing O'Farrell a stay of execution, but a 5–0 thumping by relegation rivals Crystal Palace just before Christmas proved too much, and led to the manager's dismissal on 19 December. In a way it was the end of an era, with Bill Foulkes having retired, Bobby Charlton's testimonial having been held the previous day and George Best once again announcing his retirement on the same day. Charlton, now 35, would play his last match for the club at the end of that season.

== Tommy Docherty ==
Three days later, Scotland manager Tommy Docherty was announced as United's new boss, and immediately began to rebuild the side with a series of signings, most notably Lou Macari. United recovered and finished that season in 18th place. However, there were concerns about just how long the squad, made up of the few remaining members of the Busby team and seasoned older players signed by O'Farrell and Docherty, could stay afloat in the first division. The emergence of Macari and new captain Martin Buchan (widely regarded as the one decent signing O'Farrell had managed while in charge of the club) gave some cause for optimism, but the following season would prove to be a major struggle.

Denis Law left on a free transfer during the close season to sign for Manchester City, which sparked some protests among fans. Best came out of retirement once more to sign with the team for the 1973–74 season. United were again caught in a relegation battle and entered the penultimate match of the season needing to win two match and for Birmingham City to lose in order to stay in the First Division. Birmingham won their match and Denis Law, playing for City against United, sealed United's fate with the only goal of the match, although Birmingham's victory meant United would have been relegated regardless of their own result. Manchester United were relegated to the Second Division after 36 years away.

By the time the season was over, George Best had finally walked out of United for good, playing his last match on New Year's Day 1974, although he did not actually leave the club until the following season when he was given a free transfer and signed for Stockport County.

After the relegation, Docherty culled most of what remained of Busby's squad, with goalkeeper Alex Stepney being the only member of the European Cup-winning team to remain in the first team for the start of the following season. The new-look Manchester United squad was built around youthful players such as Sammy McIlroy, who had come to impress during the final months of the ill-fated 1973–74 campaign. Also in the squad were new signings like centre-half Jim Holton, winger Gordon Hill and forward Stuart Pearson.

Despite the relegation, attendances at Old Trafford swelled during the 1974–75 season and United responded well, winning the Second Division and returning to the top flight, where they topped the standings in the early stages of the 1975–76 season and there were high hopes that United could become only the third club to be champions of the top flight one season after being promoted. However, form slipped mid-season, however, and finished third. A good FA Cup run also ended in disappointment at Wembley with a 1–0 defeat by Southampton in the final.

United performed erratically in the league in 1976–77, struggling for consistency with some injury problems to key players, and finishing the season in sixth place, but United reached the FA Cup final again, this time beating Liverpool 2–1 in the final. This result ended Liverpool's chances of completing the treble, something United themselves would achieve 22 years later.

The new-look Manchester United side contained impressive young players like Steve Coppell, Sammy McIlroy, Brian Greenhoff, Jimmy Greenhoff, Arthur Albiston and Stuart Pearson. Although goalkeeper Alex Stepney was still with United, Busby's final signing and United's former captain Willie Morgan had left in the summer of 1975 after a dispute with manager Tommy Docherty. United were now being captained by Martin Buchan.

But just over a month later, news broke of Tommy Docherty's love affair with Mary Brown, the wife of the team's physiotherapist Laurie Brown, when he announced he was leaving his wife to marry her. When Docherty refused to resign, the board dismissed him. While Docherty's affair had been disruptive to the club, it was not a legally valid reason to dismiss someone, and so the board stated that he had been dismissed for abusing his position in order to obtain tickets for the two cup finals, and selling them for a profit. Despite this, it was well known why Docherty had been sacked, and there were suggestions he would sue the club for wrongful dismissal. However, Docherty never did so.

== Dave Sexton ==
Docherty had been popular with the fans, and the new manager, Dave Sexton, needed success to dispel the unfavorable comparisons. Sexton's track record was impressive – he had won the FA Cup and UEFA Cup Winners' Cup with Chelsea and taken unfancied Queens Park Rangers to the brink of the league title. He had rejected United's first approach for him to become manager in 1971, and had been linked with the job as long ago as 1969 when Busby's retirement was first announced.

With the FA Cup win, United qualified for the UEFA Cup Winners' Cup, but were nearly expelled because of crowd trouble in Saint-Étienne.

Once more United made it to the FA Cup final in 1979, but narrowly lost to Arsenal in what was known as the "five-minute final" for the flurry of goals in the last minutes.

Among Dave Sexton's most notable transfer market moves was the double acquisition of Joe Jordan and Gordon McQueen from fierce rivals Leeds United, a club that had struggled to remain at the pinnacle of English football following Don Revie's departure for the England national team in 1974. Alongside an increasingly dominant Liverpool, United confronted a formidable new rival in Brian Clough's Nottingham Forest. After securing promotion to the First Division in 1977, the East Midlands side mounted a historic run, capturing one First Division title, two European Cups, and two League Cups over the next three seasons.

The 1979–80 season, before which United had paid a club record £750,000 to sign midfielder Ray Wilkins from Chelsea, saw the Reds narrowly miss out on league glory, finishing second to Liverpool. During that season, United fans were blamed for a collapse at Ayresome Park causing the death of two Middlesbrough supporters. Controversy also erupted over allegations that United had been making illegal payments to young players, an allegation which was made shortly before the sudden death of chairman Louis Edwards.

An injury crisis at the start of 1980–81 caused the team to slump to mid-table and suffer an early exit from the FA Cup, although at least Sexton managed to keep United clear of the threat of relegation. Desperate to stop the rot, Sexton brought in striker Garry Birtles for a club record £1.25 million, yet he was to prove an expensive failure who took 30 games to score his first goal. United won their final seven games of the season but still finished just eighth in the league.

Despite achieving runners-up spot in the league and reaching an FA Cup final during his time at the club, Sexton knew that "nearly" just wasn't good enough for United fans, and he was sacked at the end of the 1980–81 season.

== Ron Atkinson ==
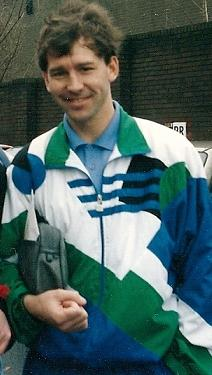
Bryan Robson was the captain of Manchester United for 12 years, longer than any other player.

United chairman Martin Edwards searched for a new manager in hope of finding someone who could bring the league title to United. The most likely candidate for the job was Lawrie McMenemy, whose Southampton had shocked United in the FA Cup final five years earlier and were now competing in the upper reaches of the First Division. Brian Clough, who had taken Nottingham Forest to promotion to the league title to two European Cup triumphs in four successive seasons, was also rumoured to be linked with the vacancy, but chairman Martin Edwards insisted that United would not be making an approach for Clough. Bobby Robson, whose Ipswich Town side had just won the UEFA Cup), was also named as a possible candidate, as was Ron Saunders, who had just guided Aston Villa to their first league title in 71 years. But in the end, it was Ron Atkinson who got the job.

He broke the British transfer record in October 1981 to sign England midfielder Bryan Robson from West Bromwich Albion for £1.5 million, and signed Robson's teammate Remi Moses for £500,000 at the same time. Norman Whiteside soon broke through the youth ranks and was a key first team player at age 17, while striker Frank Stapleton managed a steady supply of goals after his acquisition from Arsenal. Atkinson also retained a number of players from the Sexton era, namely midfielder Ray Wilkins. Long-serving players Martin Buchan and Lou Macari, who had been with United under Docherty and in the case of Buchan under O'Farrell, were still with the club when Atkinson arrived, although both had left by 1984.

Atkinson's side produced an attractive form of football, losing only eight games and finishing 3rd in his first season. The title race, which had featured a few predictable contestants including Ipswich Town and Tottenham Hotspur as well as a few surprise contenders like Southampton and even Swansea City, went to a Liverpool side who were England's top footballing side of the time.

Success followed as United won the 1983 FA Cup final 4–0 after a replay against Brighton & Hove Albion. United also managed another third-place finish in the league, where Liverpool were champions again, and runners-up spot went to a Watford side who made the headlines with some impressive performances in their first season in the top flight. United also reached the cup final of the League Cup for the first time, but lost 2–1 to Liverpool. Norman Whiteside scored for United in both cup finals that season – the first player in English football to do so.

Although United beat Liverpool in the 1983 FA Charity Shield at the start of the following season, they crashed out of the FA Cup in a humbling defeat at the hands of Third Division AFC Bournemouth. They rallied however to defeat Barcelona in the UEFA Cup Winners' Cup and made it to the semi-finals before losing to Juventus. United fought a fierce title challenge with the likes of Liverpool, Southampton and Nottingham Forest before a late slump consigned them to fourth place. The summer of 1984 saw the sale of popular midfielder Ray Wilkins to Milan after five years at Old Trafford, but Atkinson used the outlay from the sale to bolster his midfield with the acquisition of Gordon Strachan from Aberdeen and Jesper Olsen from Ajax.

Welsh striker Mark Hughes made his debut for United in October 1983 and became a regular player the following season, where he scored 24 goals and was chosen as the Young Footballer of the Year for 1984–85. His form was such that, despite only being 21, he helped restrict the first team chances of £500,000 signing Alan Brazil and even managed to force Norman Whiteside out of a regular place for a short time, although Whiteside was then switched to central midfield after an injury to Remi Moses.

In 1985, Manchester United beat that season's league champions Everton to win another FA Cup, despite having been beaten 5-0 by Everton earlier that season, but not without some drama as Kevin Moran became the first player, albeit controversially, to ever be sent off in an FA Cup final. Down to ten men, Norman Whiteside scored the only goal of the match in extra time to win the cup. The victory would have given United entry to the 1985–86 European Cup Winners' Cup, but Liverpool's involvement in the Heysel Stadium disaster resulted in a five-year ban from European football for English clubs. United finished fourth in the league that season.

The 1985–86 season started spectacularly for United, who won all of their first ten league matches (a club record start to a season) and were ten points clear at the top of the table as early as October. They were unbeaten from their first 15 matches and it seemed that nothing would stop United from winning their first league title since 1967. However, their form slumped dramatically in the new year, with an injury to Bryan Robson meaning he missed much of the season, and they could only finish in fourth place. The club had decided to sell Mark Hughes against his wishes, and he developed a drinking problem which seriously affected his form before signing for Barcelona in the close season for around £2 million. The mid-season arrival of new strikers Terry Gibson and Peter Davenport did little to halt United's decline. They had finished 12 points behind champions Liverpool and were also ten points adrift of runners-up Everton, whose top scorer Gary Lineker linked up with Hughes at Barcelona that summer, and eighth points behind a West Ham United side who had emerged as surprise title contenders thanks largely to 26 goals that season from Scottish striker Frank McAvennie.

Over the 1986 close season, rumours began to circulate that Ron Atkinson would be sacked as Manchester United manager. There was talk that Alex Ferguson, manager of Scottish side Aberdeen, would replace Atkinson. Another name to be linked with the job was Terry Venables, the Barcelona manager who had rejected an offer to manage Arsenal that spring, but the 1986–87 season began with Atkinson still manager.

The following season began poorly with three successive defeats, including a 1–0 home defeat by newly promoted Charlton Athletic, who had last played top division football in the 1950s. Their first win came at the fifth attempt when they beat Southampton 5–1 at home, but the next few weeks saw them lose to Everton and more worryingly drop points against the likes of Watford and Coventry City, as well as missing two penalties at home to Chelsea which enabled the West Londoners to grab all three points. The final straw came on 4 November 1986, when United lost 4–1 at Southampton in a League Cup third round replay. On the morning of 6 November 1986, the club's board announced that Atkinson had been sacked as manager, and later that day, Alex Ferguson was named as his successor.

Ferguson won trophies in Scotland during a period where Rangers and Celtic had dominated Scottish football for nearly 90 years. At Manchester United, he inherited a team fourth from the bottom in the First Division, with the goal of winning trophies and the league title, which the club had not won in nearly 20 years. The squad included players such as captain Bryan Robson, attacking midfielder Norman Whiteside (who had won two FA Cup medals and made close to 200 first-team appearances by age 21), and defender Paul McGrath, along with additional signings.
