= History of Manchester United F.C. (1986–2013) =

History of an English football club

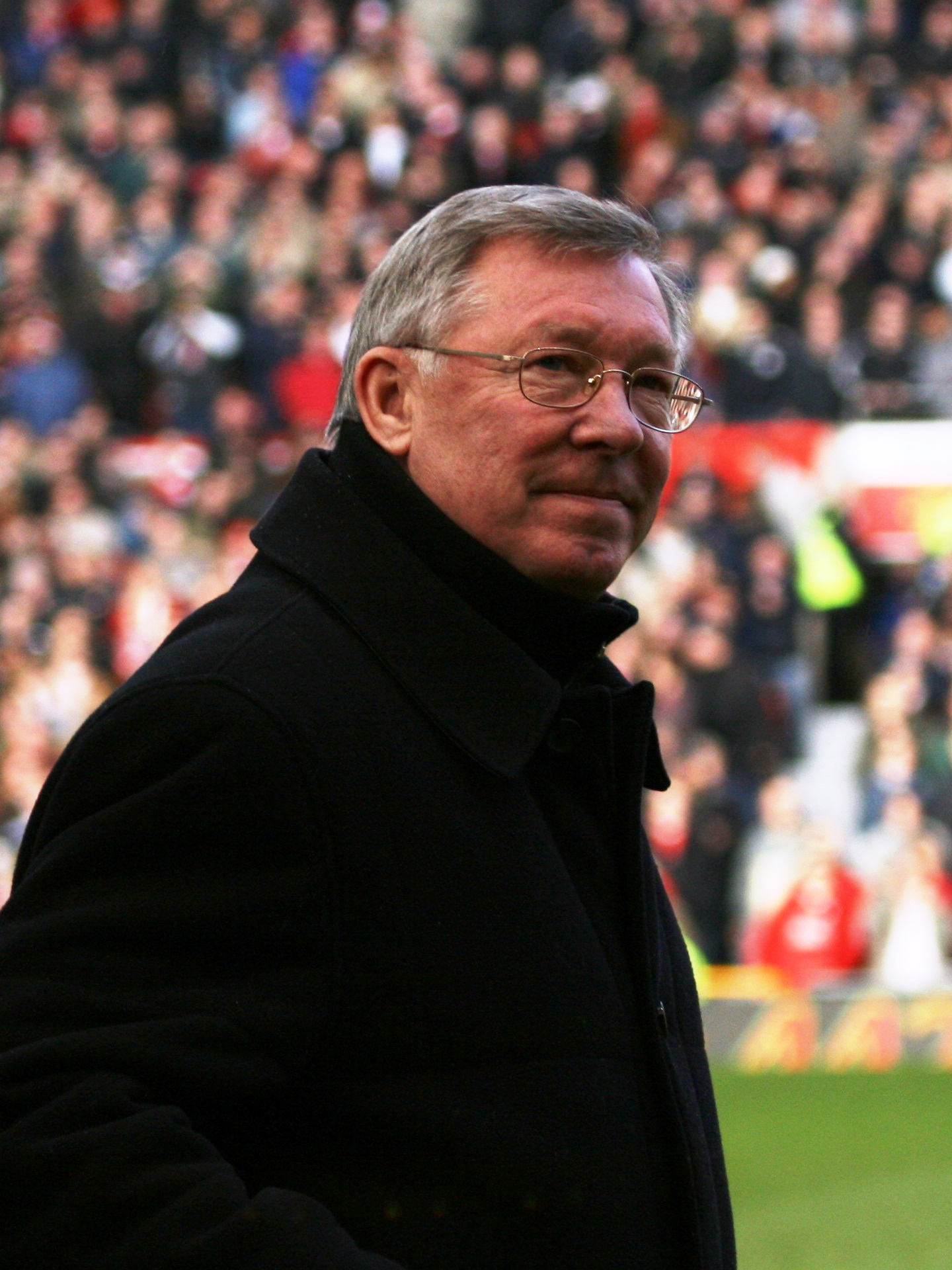
Sir Alex Ferguson, manager of Manchester United from 1986 to 2013

The period from 1986, when Alex Ferguson was appointed as Manchester United manager, to 2013, when he announced his retirement from football, was the most successful in the club's history. Ferguson joined the club from Aberdeen on the same day that Ron Atkinson was dismissed, and guided the club to an 11th-place finish in the league. Despite a second-place finish in 1987–88, the club was back in 11th place the following season. Reportedly on the verge of being dismissed after the club finished 13th in the 1989-90 season, victory over Crystal Palace in the 1990 FA Cup Final replay (after a 3–3 draw) saved Ferguson's career. The following season, Manchester United claimed their first UEFA Cup Winners' Cup title. That triumph allowed the club to compete in the European Super Cup for the very first time, where United beat European Cup holders Red Star Belgrade 1–0 at Old Trafford. A second consecutive League Cup final appearance in 1992 saw the club win that competition for the first time as well, following a 1–0 win against Nottingham Forest at Wembley Stadium. In 1993, the club won its first league title since 1967, and a year later, for the first time since 1957, it won a second consecutive title – alongside the FA Cup – to complete the first "Double" in the club's history. United then became the first English club to do the Double twice when they won both competitions again in 1995–96, before retaining the league title once more in 1996–97 with a game to spare.

Manchester United's 1998–99 season was the most successful in English club football history as they became the first team to win the Premier League, FA Cup and UEFA Champions League – "The Treble" – in the same season. Losing 1–0 going into injury time in the 1999 UEFA Champions League Final, Teddy Sheringham and Ole Gunnar Solskjær scored late goals to claim a dramatic victory over Bayern Munich, in what is considered one of the greatest comebacks of all time. The club then became the only British team to ever win the Intercontinental Cup after beating Palmeiras 1–0 in Tokyo. Ferguson was subsequently knighted for his services to football.

In 2000, Manchester United competed in the inaugural FIFA Club World Championship in Brazil, and won the league again in 1999–2000, 2000–01 and 2002–03. They won the 2003–04 FA Cup – beating Millwall 3–0 in the final at the Millennium Stadium in Cardiff – and the 2005–06 Football League Cup – beating Wigan Athletic in the final. The club regained the Premier League title in 2006–07 and 2007–08, making history in the latter by completing the European double with a 6–5 penalty shoot-out win over Chelsea in the 2008 UEFA Champions League Final at Moscow's Luzhniki Stadium. Ryan Giggs made a record 759th appearance for the club in this game, overtaking previous record holder, Bobby Charlton. In December 2008, the club became the first British team to win the FIFA Club World Cup and followed it with a third successive Premier League title, the first time any team had won three successive league titles more than once. In 2010, Manchester United defeated Aston Villa 2–1 to retain the League Cup and mark their first successful defence of a knockout cup competition. The following season was even more successful, as the club secured a record-breaking 19th league title, overtaking arch-rivals Liverpool's long-standing record of 18 titles that they had equalled in 2009, with a 1–1 draw against Blackburn Rovers on 14 May 2011. That record was extended to 20 titles in 2013, in what proved to be Ferguson's final season at the club. He retired as the most decorated manager in football history.

== Arrival of Alex Ferguson and cup successes: 1986–1992 ==
Alex Ferguson joined Manchester United from Aberdeen on 6 November 1986, the same day that previous manager Ron Atkinson was dismissed, and immediately set about rebuilding the club's youth system. In Ferguson's first game in charge, the team lost 2–0 to Oxford United; his first victory came on 22 November 1986, a 1–0 defeat of Queens Park Rangers at Old Trafford. Over the next few weeks, results continued to improve, and on Boxing Day 1986, the team beat Liverpool 1–0 at Anfield – the club's only away league win of the season, and the only home defeat of the season for their hosts. United's improvement continued throughout the season, despite no new signings being made, and they finished 11th in a First Division where Everton finished champions and Liverpool runners-up, representing the dominance of English football by the Merseyside clubs at the time.

That summer, Ferguson made his first signings: defender Viv Anderson from Arsenal, and striker Brian McClair from Celtic. Ferguson also made bids to sign Stuart Pearce from Nottingham Forest and Peter Beardsley from Newcastle United, but both offers were rejected. The following season, Manchester United finished runners-up in the league, nine points behind champions Liverpool, giving supporters cause to be optimistic for a title challenge in the 1988–89 season. These hopes were strengthened by the return of Mark Hughes two years after his departure to Barcelona; his £1.8 million fee that took him back to Old Trafford was United's record signing. United also signed Scottish goalkeeper Jim Leighton from Aberdeen and teenage winger Lee Sharpe from Torquay United, but were pipped to midfielder Paul Gascoigne by Tottenham Hotspur in the first £2 million signing by a British club.

After suffering a number of injuries to first-team players in the 1988–89 season, Ferguson introduced a host of young players into the team – including Sharpe as well as Russell Beardsmore (who inspired United to a 3–1 win over Liverpool on New Year's Day 1989). A six-match winning run beginning in January saw the club rise to third place in February, but it finished the season in 11th after a slump set in during the seasons' final quarter. The champions this time were Arsenal, who had re-emerged as a leading force in the English game since the appointment of former United player George Graham as manager. Most worryingly, United finished below the likes of Norwich City, Coventry City and Millwall.

Ferguson responded that summer by strengthening his squad with expensive signings in the shape of midfielders Neil Webb and Mike Phelan, followed by a club record £2.3 million signing of defender Gary Pallister and lower fees for winger Danny Wallace and midfielder Paul Ince in the early stages of the 1989–90 season. The continuing changes in the United squad had just seen the sale of two players who had been the centerpiece of the Atkinson era – Paul McGrath and Norman Whiteside. While McGrath would continue playing top-flight football into the late 1990s, Whiteside would play for just two more years before continuing injury problems finally forced him to hang up his boots at the age of just 26.

In August 1989, the club received a takeover bid by Michael Knighton; chairman Martin Edwards agreed to sell the club to Knighton for £20 million, but the deal fell through when his financial backers pulled out. The season had started with United in fine form, beating defending champions Arsenal 4–1 at home on the opening day of the season, but disappointing results soon followed and by January 1990, United stood 17th in the league – just one place above the relegation zone. It was now 23 years since United had been league champions, but one respected sports journalist in The Times was keen to point out that it would now appear more relevant that it had been 16 years since United had last been relegated.

By November 1989, newspaper reports suggested that Ferguson was on the verge of being sacked, although the United board denied that the manager's job was at risk; despite naturally disappointed with the lack of success in the league, they understood the reasons – namely the lengthy absence of key players including Bryan Robson and Neil Webb through injury. But victory over Crystal Palace in the 1990 FA Cup Final replay (after a 3–3 draw) saved his career. However, the club finished 13th, their lowest league placing since returning to the top flight in 1975; just five points separated them from the relegation zone. Liverpool were league champions that season for an English record 18th time.

With the ban on English clubs in European competitions now lifted after five years, the FA Cup success qualified the team to compete in the 1990–91 European Cup Winners' Cup; Manchester United reached the final, in which the club beat Barcelona 2–1 at De Kuip in Rotterdam, becoming the first English club to win a European trophy since the Heysel disaster had forced English clubs into a five-year ban from European competition. United's league form improved in 1990–91 with a sixth-place finish, and their defence of the FA Cup ended in the fifth round, with a 2–1 loss against Norwich City. The club reached the 1991 League Cup Final, but lost to Sheffield Wednesday. This season also saw the debut of teenage winger Ryan Giggs, who became a regular member of the first team the following season and went on to win more than 20 major trophies with the club before retiring as a player in 2014.

In June 1991, Manchester United floated on the London Stock Exchange, with a valuation of £18 million, raising £6.7 million.

New to the United squad for the 1991–92 season were goalkeeper Peter Schmeichel and defender Paul Parker, but the big news of the season was the breakthrough of teenage winger Ryan Giggs, who had made his debut the previous season and played in most of United's games in 1991–92. Strong performances from Schmeichel, Parker, Giggs and established players like Steve Bruce, Gary Pallister, Mark Hughes, Brian McClair and the veteran Bryan Robson helped United take an early lead in the title race, and by Christmas the title race was looking increasingly like a two-horse race between Manchester United and a resurgent Leeds United, with pre-season favourites Arsenal and Liverpool failing to impress. United ended 1991 with just one league defeat of the season to their name, but then lost 4–1 at home to unfashionable Queens Park Rangers on New Year's Day, and over the next three months goals dried up and United dropped points against the likes of Coventry City, Wimbledon, Notts County and Luton Town – teams they had been widely expected to beat. United were constantly linked with the signature of 21-year-old Southampton striker Alan Shearer, but the player refused to consider a transfer from the South Coast club until the end of the season, and so United went into the final stages of the title race with a tough battle on their hands, although a few disappointing results for Leeds United meant that the race was still wide open with just two weeks of the season remaining.

With three games to go, United were one point behind league leaders Leeds United, but the West Yorkshire club had played a game more. United then travelled to a West Ham United side heading for relegation and knew that a victory would put the title race in their hands and the end of the 25-year wait was potentially just four days away – and could be won on the home soil of their fierce rivals Liverpool. But United lost 1–0. On 26 April 1992, the team lost 2–0 to Liverpool at Anfield and Leeds (spearheaded by former United midfielder Gordon Strachan, who had joined them in March 1989 when they were still in the Second Division) secured the league title. However, the team had won the League Cup two weeks earlier, defeating Nottingham Forest 1–0 in the final. At the end of the season, 18-year-old Welsh winger Ryan Giggs was voted PFA Young Player of the Year.

== Premier League success: 1992–1995 ==
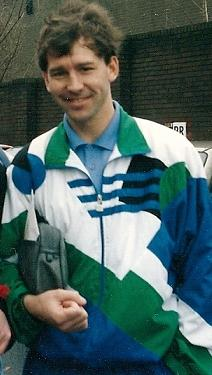
Bryan Robson was the captain of Manchester United for 12 years, longer than any other player.

After a shortage of goals in the second half of the 1991–92 season cost United the league title, Ferguson was intent on signing a new striker. His key target was the Southampton striker Alan Shearer, but he lost out to a newly promoted Blackburn Rovers side now managed by Kenny Dalglish, who had managed Liverpool to three league titles and was now backed by the millions of steel baron Jack Walker in the quest to bring similar success to the resurgent Lancashire club. Ferguson then switched his attention to Dion Dublin, the 23-year-old striker who had excelled in the lower divisions with Cambridge United. A week before the new Premier League season began, Dublin completed a £1 million move to Old Trafford to become United's only close season signing.

Dublin arrived at Old Trafford as Mark Robins was sold to Norwich City. Still only 22, Robins had been instrumental in United's FA Cup triumph two years earlier, but had rarely featured in the 1991–92 season. He signed for a side who were among the pre-season favourites for relegation from the new Premier League, but few people could have imagined at the time that Robins would go on to be top scorer for one of United's biggest rivals in the race for the title.

United's first Premier League game was a disappointing 2–1 defeat at unfancied Sheffield United, and days later they lost 3–0 at home to an Everton side who over the last few seasons had gradually drifted out of the league's top reaches. The first victory of the league season came at the fourth attempt when a late goal by Dublin gave them a 1–0 win at Southampton, but Dublin then broke his leg in the next game against Crystal Palace and was sidelined for six months. Some decent results including wins over Leeds United and Nottingham Forest followed, but by late October United had endured a run of five successive draws and the all too familiar goal shortage was attributed to this once again. Defeats against Wimbledon and Ron Atkinson's Aston Villa saw United occupy 10th place in the league by 7 November 1992, with one of the lowest goal tallies in the division. Over the next couple of weeks, United were linked with moves for some of the most highly regarded strikers in the English league, including Brian Deane and David Hirst, but on 26 November 1992 United made a £1.1 million move for French striker Eric Cantona, who had helped Leeds United win the previous season's league title. The arrival of Cantona helped transform United's fortunes, and by the turn of 1993 they were looking like title contenders again. Despite challenges from Aston Villa, Blackburn Rovers and surprise contenders Norwich City, United went on a storming run during the final weeks of the season to win the title by a 10-point margin and end their 26-year wait. United were actually confirmed as champions without kicking a ball, when on 2 May 1993 their last remaining contenders Aston Villa surprisingly lost 1–0 at home to unfancied Oldham Athletic, who had given United a serious challenge in the FA Cup semi-finals three seasons earlier and would do so again the following season.

United broke the English transfer fee record over the summer of 1993 by paying relegated Nottingham Forest £3.75 million for Irish midfielder Roy Keane. United started the following season with Wembley glory, beating Arsenal on penalties in the FA Charity Shield after a 1–1 draw. Manchester United led the Premier League at the end of August, a lead they maintained all season. By the end of October, they were 11 points ahead and their lead peaked at 16 points in the new year. Despite a second round exit from the UEFA Champions League, they were on a strong run in the League Cup and after beating Sheffield United in the FA Cup third round on 9 January 1994, United now had their sights set on a unique domestic treble. The club then endured sadness later that month with the death of Sir Matt Busby.

In March 1994, United dropped points against Arsenal and bottom-of-the-table Swindon Town, in which Cantona was sent off in both games and subsequently received a five-match suspension. They then lost the League Cup final to Aston Villa and in April were beaten by Blackburn Rovers and Wimbledon, which meant that they were now ahead of Blackburn Rovers only on goal difference. They very nearly went out of the FA Cup in the semi-final at Wembley, before Mark Hughes scored a late equaliser to force a Maine Road replay, which United won 4–1. An upturn in results soon followed, and United clinched their title on 1 May 1994 when they won 2–1 at Ipswich Town.

Cantona finished the season with 25 goals in all competitions and was subsequently voted PFA Players' Player of the Year. Other players to impress during this campaign included Mark Hughes, Paul Ince, Ryan Giggs and Lee Sharpe. It was the last season at Old Trafford for club captain Bryan Robson after 13 years and more than 400 appearances; he had accepted an offer to manage Middlesbrough. Also on their way out of the club that summer were Les Sealey (the goalkeeping hero of the 1990 FA Cup final replay who had later returned as Peter Schmeichel's understudy), Mike Phelan and long-serving utility player Clayton Blackmore.

In the 1994 FA Cup Final on 14 May, it was goalless at half time but two Cantona penalties and subsequent goals from Mark Hughes and Brian McClair gave United a comprehensive 4–0 win over Chelsea and saw them match Tottenham's record of eight FA Cup triumphs. Ferguson felt that his current squad were good enough to challenge on all fronts in the season which followed the Double, and made only one close-season signing, paying Blackburn Rovers £1.2 million for defender David May, seeing the 24-year-old as a potential eventual successor to the ageing Steve Bruce. United were also linked with a move for the high-scoring young Norwich striker Chris Sutton, but the player then signed for Blackburn in English football's first £5 million transfer.

The 1994–95 season saw United rarely out of the headlines, though on occasion they were not always the type of headlines that were welcome. On 25 January 1995, Eric Cantona kicked Matthew Simmons, a Crystal Palace hooligan who had taunted him with anti-French racist abuse after being sent off in a January fixture at Selhurst Park. Cantona was immediately suspended by the club for the rest of the season, a ban which The Football Association extended until the end of September that year, and he also received a 14-day prison sentence at his trial, although this was reduced to a community service order on appeal two months later.

United were also without players like Paul Parker, Ryan Giggs and Andrei Kanchelskis for long periods of time due to injury. 1994–95 also saw the debuts of promising young players Paul Scholes and Phil Neville. Scholes was particularly impressive, scoring five goals in 17 games. Having made a handful of appearances between them in the previous two seasons, Gary Neville, David Beckham and Nicky Butt all made more regular appearances for United during 1994–95.

United broke the English transfer record again on 10 January 1995 by paying £7 million (£6 million in cash plus winger Keith Gillespie, who was valued at £1 million) for Newcastle United's free-scoring striker Andy Cole. He had been signed just two weeks before the Cantona incident as an eventual replacement for 31-year-old Mark Hughes, who was subject of interest from Everton at the time of Cole's arrival, but with Cantona suspended it was Hughes who ended up being Cole's partner for the rest of the season. Cole did not take long to make an impact at Old Trafford, bagging five in a Premier League record 9–0 win over Ipswich Town at Old Trafford two months after joining the club, and finding the net a total of 12 times for United by the end of the season. However, he was unable to participate in the club's FA Cup run, having already been selected by Newcastle in the competition.

The season had already brought some impressive results, including a "double" over fellow title challengers Blackburn Rovers and a 5–0 home win over Manchester City in the Manchester derby, and even after Cantona's suspension there were some more impressive victories over the likes of Wimbledon, Arsenal and Leicester City, but United also dropped crucial points against the likes of Liverpool, Tottenham Hotspur and Chelsea, which left their title hopes looking slim by mid-April. However, a run of three victories and a couple of blunders by Blackburn kept the title race going right to the wire.

United almost made it three league titles in a row, but just couldn't get the better of a West Ham side who held them to a 1–1 draw in East London on the final day of the season. The FA Cup also slipped out of United's grasp when they lost 1–0 to unfancied Everton in the final at Wembley.

Just before the end of the 1994–95 season, United announced the demolition of the North Stand and the construction of a new stand seating more than 26,000 fans in its place, which would be completed within 12 months. There was optimism for the future as United's promising youngsters won the FA Youth Cup, and after three months of speculation about his future – with Internazionale being strongly linked with his signature – Eric Cantona put an end to speculation that he would be leaving Old Trafford by signing a new three-year contract at the end of April.

== Second Double: 1995–1998 ==
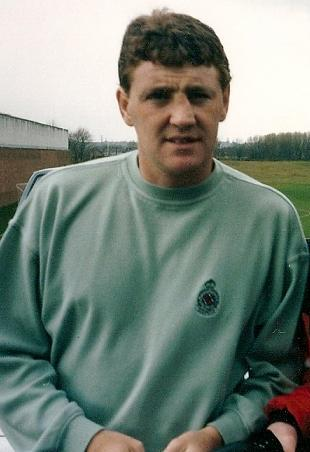
Steve Bruce

After Eric Cantona's decision to stay with Manchester United, Internazionale turned their attention to United midfielder Paul Ince, who finally agreed to sign for the Italian giants for £7.5 million on 22 June 1995. The next day, the sale of striker Mark Hughes to Chelsea was announced. Shortly afterwards, unsettled winger and top scorer Andrei Kanchelskis was put on the transfer list, and was subsequently sold to Everton. Alex Ferguson came under intense pressure from media and fans for selling three key players after the disappointing end to the 1994–95 season, with the Manchester Evening News even conducting a survey asking its readers whether or not Ferguson should be sacked.

The pressure mounted on Ferguson as the new season began without a major signing, with Ferguson instead putting his faith in young members of the squad such as David Beckham, Gary Neville, Phil Neville, Paul Scholes and Nicky Butt. This was seen as a big gamble, especially as the likes of Newcastle United, Liverpool and Arsenal had spent heavily in the close season. Alan Hansen famously proclaimed: "you can't win anything with kids" on Match of the Day on 19 August 1995, after United lost 3–1 at Aston Villa. The club defied this prediction with subsequent excellent performances and just one more defeat before mid-December, although a 3–1 defeat at Leeds United on Christmas Eve left them 10 points behind leaders Newcastle, their fifth successive winless match. Aside a New Year's Day defeat at Tottenham Hotspur and a goalless draw at home to Aston Villa, United regained their winning touch after Christmas and reached the top of the Premier League in mid-March, just after an Eric Cantona goal had given them a 1–0 win at Newcastle. Cantona was instrumental in subsequent victories, and despite a 3–1 defeat at Southampton in mid-April, United remained firmly in control at the top and sealed the title on the last day of the season with a 3–0 win at Bryan Robson's Middlesbrough. A week later, Manchester United beat Liverpool 1–0 in the FA Cup final to become the first ever English club to win the league/FA Cup Double twice. Eric Cantona, who scored 19 goals in 1995–96 (including the FA Cup final winner), was voted FWA Footballer of the Year by football journalists and was made team captain following the departure of Steve Bruce to Birmingham City.

United once again tried to sign Alan Shearer over the summer of 1996, but they were beaten to his signature by Newcastle United for a then world record fee of £15 million. A new striker did arrive at Old Trafford that summer – Ole Gunnar Solskjær, a little-known 23-year-old Norwegian striker who arrived at Old Trafford the day before Shearer signed for Newcastle. Another Norwegian, defender Ronny Johnsen, was also signed to fill the gap left by veteran Steve Bruce's departure to Birmingham City. United also paid £3.5 million for the Czech winger Karel Poborský, who had made the headlines with a spectacular goal for the Czechs at Euro 96. United also expanded their options in the wider attacking positions by signing Jordi Cruyff, son of the Dutch legend Johan, from Barcelona. However, it was Solskjær and Johnsen who would go on to enjoy the longest and most successful careers with United, whereas Poborský lasted just 18 months before being sold to Benfica, and Cruyff was unable to hold down a regular place during his four seasons at Old Trafford.

For a while that autumn, it looked as though Newcastle had bought the title, as they ended United's unbeaten start to the league season on 20 October 1996 with a 5–0 defeat on Tyneside, triggering a three-match losing run in the league for Ferguson's men, who also suffered the club's first-ever home defeat in European competitions when they lost 1–0 at home to Fenerbahçe in the group stages of the UEFA Champions League.

Manchester United won their fourth league title in five seasons in 1996–97, helped by 18 goals from Solskjær. Hopes of winning the European Cup for the first time since 1968 were dashed, however, as they were defeated in the semi-finals by the eventual winners of the competition, Borussia Dortmund. At the end of the season, Eric Cantona announced his shock retirement from football just a few days before his 31st birthday. He was replaced by England international Teddy Sheringham, a £3.5 million signing from Tottenham.

The 1997–98 season saw Manchester United overhauled by Arsenal in the Premier League. They had led the league for much of the season, despite the absence of new captain Roy Keane from late September due to a serious knee injury, and managed some excellent results on the way, including heavy defeats of Barnsley and Sheffield Wednesday and away victories over Liverpool and Newcastle. They entered March still 11 points ahead at the top of the league, but Arsenal took advantage of games in hand and gained the upper hand on 14 March 1998 with a 1–0 win at Old Trafford. United did manage some decent results in the run-in, but draws at home to Liverpool and Newcastle left Arsenal uncatchable.

Shortly after this disappointment, Ferguson broke the club's transfer record twice by signing Dutch defender Jaap Stam from PSV Eindhoven, Trinidadian striker Dwight Yorke from Aston Villa. Swedish winger Jesper Blomqvist from Parma also joined the club during the off-season. The summer of 1998 saw the departure of the club's two longest-serving players: Brian McClair ended his 11-year association with United by returning to his first club Motherwell, while Gary Pallister returned to Middlesbrough after nine years at Old Trafford.

== The Treble: 1998–1999 ==
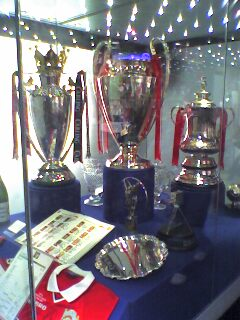
Treble trophies

The 1998–99 season was the most successful in the history of Manchester United. United won the Premier League, the FA Cup and the UEFA Champions League, becoming the first English club to achieve the feat of winning the domestic league and cup as well as the European Cup in the same season. After a 3–2 home defeat against Middlesbrough in the league on 19 December 1998, United went undefeated for the rest of the season for a run of 33 matches in all competitions.

It was during this season that United gained a reputation for not conceding defeat even in what seemed the most hopeless of circumstances, winning and drawing several matches with late goals after falling behind early on. Some of their more notable comebacks were the FA Cup fourth-round tie at home to Liverpool, which Liverpool led from the third to the 85th minute, both legs of the UEFA Champions League semi-finals against Juventus and the FA Cup semi-final against Arsenal, won by a Ryan Giggs goal deep into extra time, forced by a last-gasp Peter Schmeichel penalty save in the last of his eight seasons at the club. However, the most dramatic comeback came in the Champions League final against Bayern Munich, when Teddy Sheringham and Ole Gunnar Solskjær scored a goal each in stoppage time to give United a 2–1 win in stoppage time – a sixth-minute goal from Bayern's Mario Basler looked to have won the trophy for the Germans, who still had the lead with 90 minutes showing on the clock.

United lost just five times in the entire season; three times in the league, as well as in the Charity Shield at the start of the season, and their League Cup quarter-final, in which they were defeated by eventual winners, Tottenham Hotspur. They defeated every other Premier League team at least once in all competitions and were undefeated in the Champions League.

== Post-Treble: 1999–2005 ==
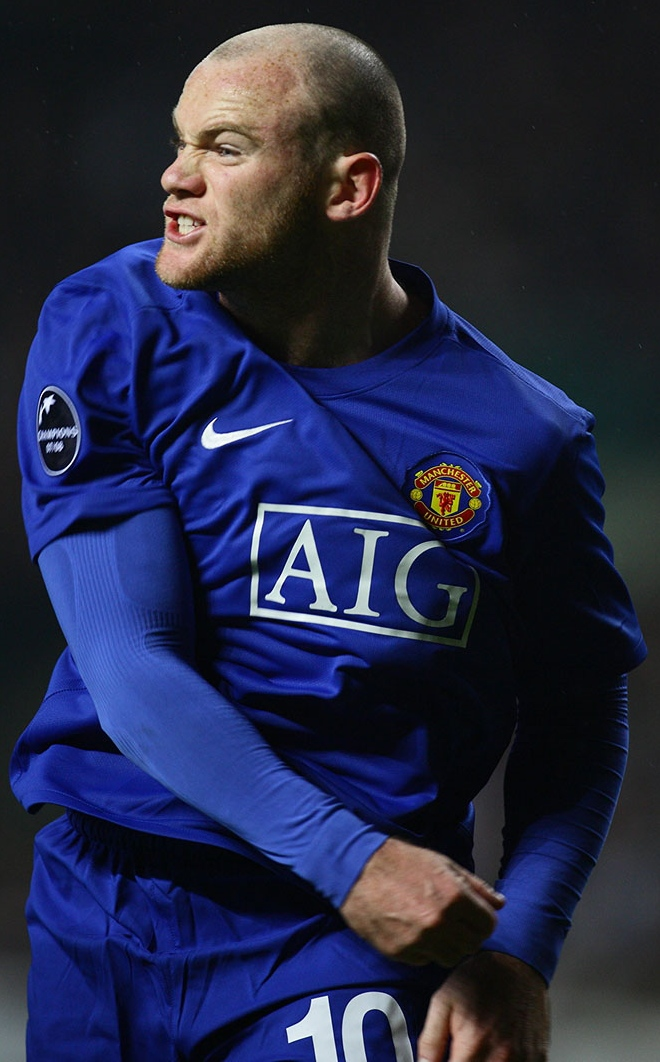
Wayne Rooney

At the expense of their presence in the 1999–2000 FA Cup, Manchester United competed in the inaugural FIFA Club World Championship, but failed to make it past the group stage. However, the team won 16 of their remaining 20 Premier League games to win the title with an 18-point margin over runners-up Arsenal, losing just three games all season. A new threat was emerging from David O'Leary's promising young Leeds United side, who finished third in the league that season and had finished fourth a year earlier, but financial problems later overtook the club and they gradually slipped out of contention for the leading honours, finally being relegated in 2004.

The following season, Manchester United won a third successive league title, Alex Ferguson becoming first manager to achieve this feat. This was once again achieved by a wide margin, and United chalked up arguably their best performance of the season in late February when they defeated Arsenal 6–1 at Old Trafford. At the end of the season, Teddy Sheringham collected both the PFA Player of the Year award and the FWA Player of the Year award, before returning to Tottenham Hotspur; he was succeeded by club record signing Ruud van Nistelrooy, a record swiftly broken by the £28.1 million signing of Argentine midfielder Juan Sebastián Verón. Van Nistelrooy would be a huge success for United, scoring 150 goals over the next five seasons, but Verón was less successful, and was sold to Chelsea two years later.

2001–02 was a trophyless season; Manchester United finished third in the Premier League, and were knocked out of the Champions League by Bayer Leverkusen and the FA Cup by Middlesbrough. They did manage very impressive performances, including comprehensive victories over the likes of Ipswich Town and Tottenham Hotspur in the autumn and Derby County and Southampton before Christmas, but a run of six defeats between 16 September and 8 December left them ninth in the league with almost half of the season gone – 11 points behind leaders Liverpool, who had a game in hand and were looking better placed to win the league title than at just about any other time since their last league title in 1990. Despite a nine-match winning run sending them to the top of the table, they were in a very tight title race involving four other clubs and their title hopes were finally ended in the penultimate game of the season, where they lost 1–0 at home to an Arsenal side who clinched their second title in five seasons.

The season was also marked by the decision of Sir Alex Ferguson to make a U-turn and stay on as manager, after he had stated that he would retire at the end of the season after 16 years at the club. The 2002 close season saw the club break the national transfer record with the £29 million signing of Leeds United and England centre-half Rio Ferdinand. He helped Manchester United to another Premier League title in 2002–03, the club's eighth title in 11 seasons, after some disappointing results in the first season saw them unbeaten after the turn of the new year. The league success was one of the more remarkable because the team were 8 points behind leaders Arsenal at the beginning of March, when they also lost the League Cup final to Liverpool. Soon afterwards, David Beckham was sold to Real Madrid for £25 million, following arguments with Ferguson.

Before the start of the season, a highly rated 18-year-old Portuguese winger called Cristiano Ronaldo arrived from Sporting CP for £12.24 million. All eyes that summer, however, were on a Chelsea side who had been taken over by Russian billionaire Roman Abramovich and had spent more than £100 million on new players. In the 2003–04 season, Manchester United won the FA Cup for the 11th time in their history, but after Rio Ferdinand received an eight-month suspension for failing to attend a drugs test, the club finished third in the Premier League, which was won by an unbeaten Arsenal, while second place went to Chelsea. Just after the start of the 2004–05 campaign, the club signed highly regarded teenage striker Wayne Rooney from Everton for £25.6 million. The club reached the FA Cup Final again but were beaten by Arsenal in a penalty shoot-out, the first time that the FA Cup Final had been decided on penalties. Chelsea finished the season as Premier League champions, while Arsenal finished second and United third.

== Glazer ownership: 2005–2013 ==
In May 2005, the Glazer family acquired a majority shareholding in Manchester United in a takeover valuing the club at £800 million, and a month later delisted it from the London Stock Exchange. In protest, a group of fans formed a splinter club, F.C. United of Manchester.

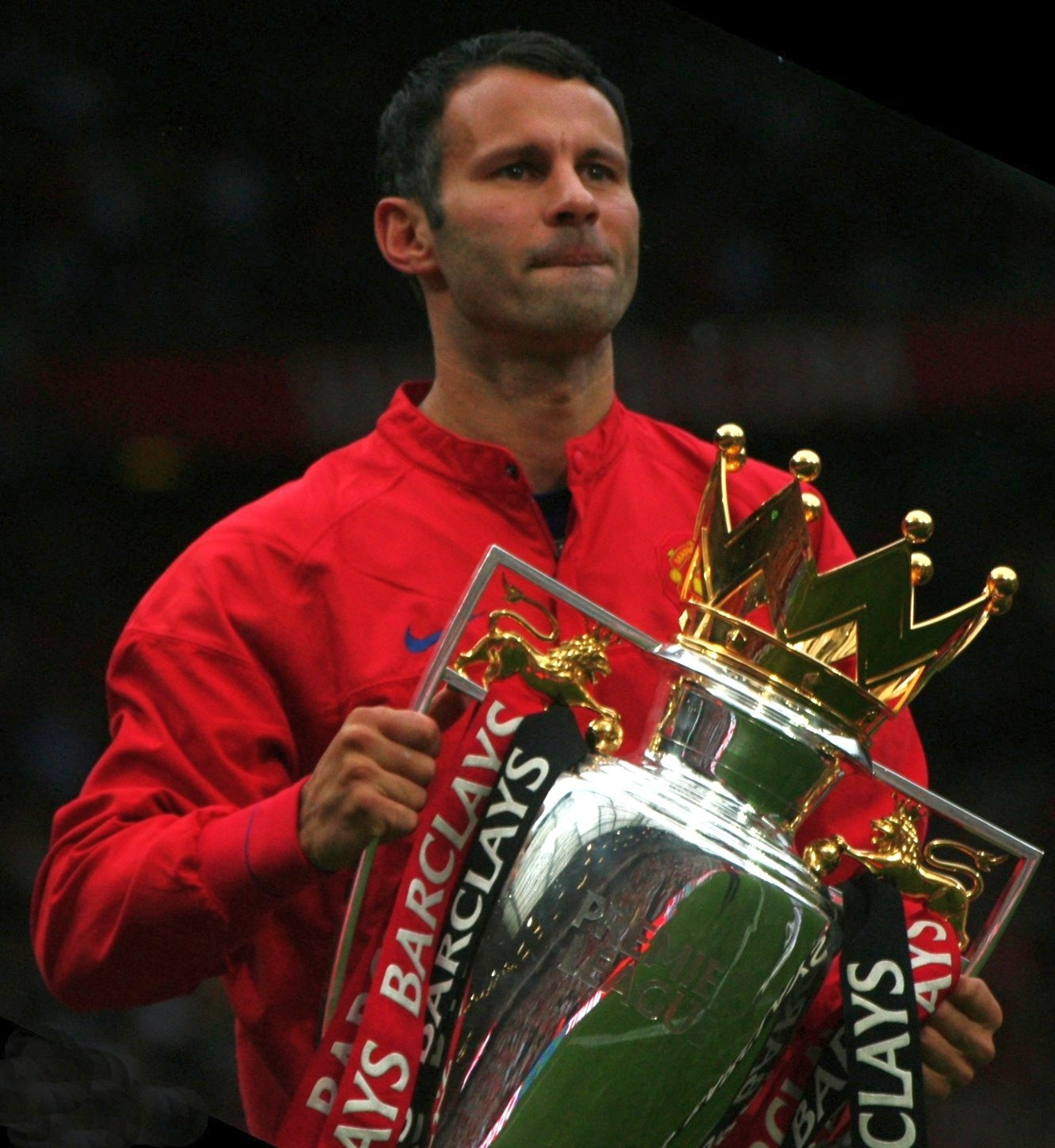
Ryan Giggs is the most decorated player in English football history.

The following season's European campaign saw the club finish bottom of its group in the Champions League, failing to qualify for the UEFA Cup, the first time the club had not reached the knock-out stages of the tournament since it was created in 1992. In November, Roy Keane left the club in acrimonious fashion after criticising his fellow players so severely in an MUTV interview that chief executive David Gill ordered it not to be broadcast. The subsequent January transfer window saw the arrival of defenders Nemanja Vidić and Patrice Evra, who helped the club to its second League Cup, defeating Wigan Athletic 4–0 in the final at the Millennium Stadium. Manchester United finished second in the Premier League, eight points behind Chelsea, who retained their title and were now seen as the leading force in English football, although Sir Alex Ferguson was determined to prevent the West London club from winning a third successive title.

In the 2006–07 season, Manchester United suffered a shock fourth round exit from the League Cup at the hands of Southend United. The club's Champions League campaign was more successful; in the second leg of their quarter-final, the team defeated Roma 7–1 (8–3 on aggregate), the club's largest margin of victory in a European game since they beat the Irish team Waterford United in the 1968 European Cup. However, the club lost to Milan in the semi-finals. On 22 April 2007, Cristiano Ronaldo won both PFA Players' Player of the Year and PFA Young Player of the Year and joined Edwin van der Sar, Rio Ferdinand, Gary Neville, Nemanja Vidić, Patrice Evra, Paul Scholes, and Ryan Giggs in the PFA Team of the Year; eight members from the same team is a record. On 6 May, Manchester United won the Premier League for the ninth time in 15 years; Giggs broke Alan Hansen's record for the most league titles won, with his ninth winner's medal.

The following season was even more successful, as in the Champions League Manchester United defeated Barcelona in the semi-final to set up the first all-English final. Following a 1–1 draw after extra time in Moscow, the team defeated Chelsea 6–5 on penalties, winning the club's third European Cup. Ryan Giggs made a record 759th appearance – breaking Bobby Charlton's club record – and scored Manchester United's winning penalty. The club also won the Premier League on the final day of the season, defeating Wigan Athletic 2–0, to win the European double and finish two points above Chelsea. The season thus saw United finish as Champions to Chelsea's runners-up in three different competitions, with United having beaten the Blues at the start of the season in the Community Shield. United almost won a second Treble, but the club was knocked out of the FA Cup in a sixth-round clash against Portsmouth, a match in which Rio Ferdinand had to fill in as goalkeeper when Kuszczak was sent off after he had come on for the injured Van der Sar.

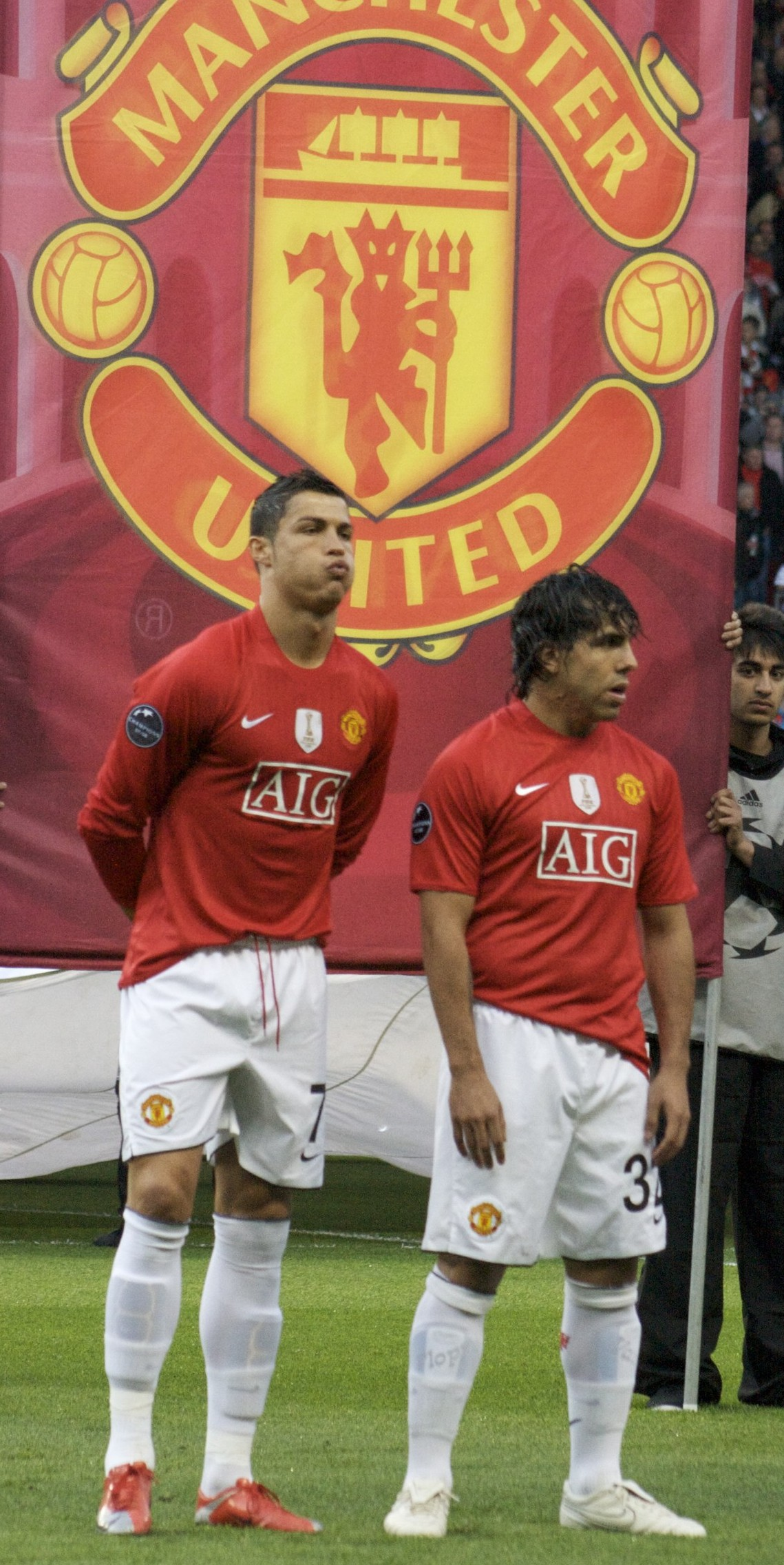
Cristiano Ronaldo and Carlos Tevez

In December 2008, the club beat LDU Quito in the final of the 2008 FIFA Club World Cup in Japan, becoming the first British team to win the competition. That season, Manchester United broke both the English and European league records for the most time played without conceding a goal. On 1 March, the club beat Tottenham Hotspur 4–1 on penalties in the 2009 League Cup Final. On 16 May, United secured their 11th Premier League title – and 18th league title overall (equalling the record held by Liverpool set in 1990) – following a 0–0 draw at home to Arsenal. This was the second time the club had won three consecutive Premier League titles. Manchester United contested a second consecutive Champions League Final in search of yet another treble of knockout competitions, but were beaten 2–0 by Barcelona in Rome on 27 May.

In the following summer transfer window, star player Cristiano Ronaldo was sold to Real Madrid for a world record £80 million and Carlos Tevez joined local rivals Manchester City, after his loan spell came to an end. On 28 February 2010, Manchester United defeated Aston Villa 2–1 at Wembley Stadium to retain the League Cup, the first time the club had successfully defended a knockout cup competition. However, they were knocked out of the Champions League in the quarter-finals by Bayern Munich on away goals, and were runners-up in the Premier League, finishing one point behind Chelsea.

During the summer, they signed an almost unknown Javier Hernández from Guadalajara. On 8 August 2010, Hernandez scored on his debut as Manchester United defeated Chelsea 3–1 to win the FA Community Shield. The 2010–11 campaign would turn out to be a historic one, with Manchester United overhauling early leaders Chelsea and securing a record 19th league title with a 1–1 away draw against Blackburn on 14 May 2011. They faced Barcelona again in the 2011 UEFA Champions League Final, but were defeated 3-1.

In the 2011–12 season, Manchester United were knocked out of the League Cup by Football League Championship side Crystal Palace in the fifth round. Just over a week later, they were knocked out of the Champions League in the group stages after a shock defeat by Basel, sending them to the UEFA Europa League for the first time. In January, Manchester United were also knocked out of the FA Cup in the fourth round by Liverpool. They lost their league title in dramatic fashion on the last day, to Manchester City. With 90 minutes showing, United's victory at Sunderland looked to have given them the title by a three-point margin as City trailed 2–1 to a QPR side managed by former United player Mark Hughes. However, two stoppage time goals saw City snatch the title on goal difference. Seven months earlier, City had crushed United 6–1 at Old Trafford in one of the club's heaviest home defeats in its history. Although, in August, United beat Arsenal 8–2 at Old Trafford, marking one of Ferguson's biggest wins against a champion of the Premier League.

In the 2012–13 season, Manchester United were knocked out of the League Cup by Chelsea in the fifth round. They were knocked out of the UEFA Champions League at the last 16 stage by Real Madrid 3–2 on aggregate. United were knocked out in the sixth round of the FA Cup by Chelsea. But overall the 2012–13 campaign was a successful one for United as they ran away with a record 20th league title, sealing it with a home win against Aston Villa on 22 April 2013. The key factor in United's success was top scorer Robin van Persie, a £25 million close-season signing from Arsenal. The Dutch forward was instrumental throughout the season and he fittingly scored all of United's goals as they won the title-clinching game 3–0.

In May 2013, just before the end of the Premier League season, Ferguson announced his retirement as manager of Manchester United after 27 years, with David Moyes of Everton being announced as his successor the next day. Ferguson remains as a director and ambassador for the club. On 19 May 2013, Ferguson managed Manchester United for the last time in the only 5–5 draw of his career, at West Bromwich Albion.

Ferguson retired as the most decorated manager in the history of football. During his last eight years at United, he won 15 trophies: five Premier League titles, three Football League Cups, five FA Community Shields, one UEFA Champions League, and one FIFA Club World Cup.
