= List of Stoke City F.C. players =

Stoke City F.C. is an English association football club based in Stoke-on-Trent, Staffordshire. The club was formed in 1863 as Stoke Ramblers F.C., and played their first competitive match in November 1883, when they entered the First Round of the 1883–84 FA Cup. In 1888 they joined the inaugural Football League thus becoming founding members. The club was renamed Stoke City F.C. in 1925, and they moved to Britannia Stadium in 1997. Since playing their first competitive match, more than 1000 players have made a competitive first-team appearance for the club, many of whom have played 100 matches+ (including substitute appearances); those players are listed here.

Despite a lack of success Stoke have had a number of famous players over the years such as Stanley Matthews, Gordon Banks, Jimmy Greenhoff and Denis Smith. Stoke City's record appearance-maker is Eric Skeels who made 596 appearances between 1959 and 1976. Stoke's top senior goalscorer is John Ritchie with 176 goals.

== List of players ==
- Appearances and goals are for first-team competitive matches only, including Premier League, Football League, Football Alliance, Birmingham & District League, Southern League, FA Cup, League Cup, League Trophy, UEFA Cup/UEFA Europa League, Anglo-Italian Cup, Birmingham League Cup, Full Members' Cup, United Counties League, Texaco Cup and Watney Cup. Wartime matches are regarded as unofficial and are excluded.
- The list is ordered first by number of appearances in total.
- Highlighted players members of the current squad.

Statistics correct as of match played 21 November 2026

Table headers

- Nationality – If a player played international football, the country/countries he played for are shown. Otherwise, the player's nationality is given as their country of birth.
- Stoke City career – The year of the player's first appearance for Stoke City to the year of his last appearance.
- Starts – The number of games started.
- Sub – The number of games played as a substitute.
- Total – The total number of games played, both as a starter and as a substitute.

Positions key
| Pre-1960s | | Post-1960s | |
|---|---|---|---|
| GK | Goalkeeper | | |
| FB | Full back | DF | Defender |
| HB | Half back | MF | Midfielder |
| FW | Forward | | |
| U | Utility player^{1} | | |

| Name | Nationality | Position | Stoke City career | Starts | Subs | Total | Goals |
| Name | Nationality | Position | Stoke City career | Appearances | | | Goals |
|---|---|---|---|---|---|---|---|
| Eric Skeels | England | DF | 1959–1976 | 579 | 18 | 597 | 7 |
| John McCue | England | DF | 1946–1960 | 542 | 0 | 542 | 2 |
| Bob McGrory | Scotland | FB | 1921–1935 | 511 | 0 | 511 | 0 |
| Denis Smith | England | DF | 1968–1982 | 492 | 1 | 493 | 42 |
| Alan Bloor | England | DF | 1961–1978 | 478 | 4 | 482 | 19 |
| Peter Fox | England | GK | 1978–1993 | 477 | 0 | 477 | 0 |
| Tony Allen | England | DF | 1957–1970 | 470 | 3 | 473 | 4 |
| Ryan Shawcross | England | DF | 2007–2021 | 444 | 9 | 453 | 25 |
| Jackie Marsh | England | DF | 1967–1979 | 435 | 9 | 444 | 3 |
| Frank Bowyer | England | FW | 1937–1960 | 436 | 0 | 436 | 149 |
| Frank Mountford | England | U | 1946–1957 | 425 | 0 | 425 | 24 |
| Alan Dodd | England | DF | 1972–1985 | 409 | 8 | 417 | 4 |
| John Sellars | England | HB | 1946–1958 | 413 | 0 | 413 | 15 |
| Harry Davies | England | FW | 1922–1937 | 411 | 0 | 411 | 101 |
| Harry Sellars | England | HB | 1923–1935 | 395 | 0 | 395 | 19 |
| Peter Dobing | England | FW | 1963–1973 | 372 | 5 | 377 | 95 |
| Stanley Matthews | England | MF | 1932–1947; 1961–1965 | 355 | 0 | 355 | 62 |
| Billy Spencer | England | FB | 1926–1936 | 354 | 0 | 354 | 0 |
| John Ritchie | England | FW | 1962–1975 | 340 | 11 | 351 | 176 |
| Harry Oscroft | England | FW | 1950–1959 | 349 | 0 | 349 | 107 |
| Jimmy Greenhoff | England | FW | 1969–1976 | 346 | 0 | 346 | 103 |
| Mike Pejic | England | DF | 1969–1977 | 344 | 0 | 344 | 9 |
| Bill Asprey | England | FB | 1954–1965 | 341 | 0 | 341 | 26 |
| Glenn Whelan | Republic of Ireland | MF | 2008–2017 | 287 | 51 | 338 | 8 |
| John Mahoney | Wales | MF | 1967–1977 | 322 | 15 | 337 | 28 |
| Terry Conroy | Republic of Ireland | FW | 1967–1979 | 304 | 31 | 335 | 67 |
| Lee Sandford | England | DF | 1989–1996 | 321 | 3 | 324 | 13 |
| John Butler | England | DF | 1988–1995 | 314 | 5 | 319 | 9 |
| Bobby Liddle | England | MF | 1928–1938 | 316 | 0 | 316 | 64 |
| Arthur Turner | England | DF | 1930–1939 | 312 | 0 | 312 | 17 |
| Johnny King | England | FW | 1953–1961 | 311 | 0 | 311 | 113 |
| Ken Thomson | Scotland | DF | 1952–1960 | 302 | 0 | 302 | 7 |
| Brendan O'Callaghan | Republic of Ireland | FW | 1977–1984 | 284 | 10 | 294 | 47 |
| Harry Burrows | England | FW | 1965–1974 | 276 | 9 | 285 | 77 |
| Ian Cranson | England | MF | 1989–1996 | 277 | 4 | 281 | 12 |
| Bobby Archibald | Scotland | FW | 1925–1931 | 276 | 0 | 276 | 40 |
| Alec Milne | England | FB | 1912–1926 | 276 | 0 | 276 | 0 |
| Carl Beeston | England | MF | 1985–1997 | 258 | 13 | 271 | 17 |
| Jonathan Walters | Republic of Ireland | FW | 2010–2017 | 224 | 47 | 271 | 62 |
| George Berry | Wales | DF | 1982–1990 | 261 | 8 | 269 | 30 |
| Tom Holford | England | MF | 1898–1908 | 269 | 0 | 269 | 33 |
| Clive Clarke | Republic of Ireland | DF | 1999–2005 | 242 | 22 | 264 | 10 |
| Peter Crouch | England | FW | 2011–2019 | 163 | 98 | 261 | 62 |
| Don Ratcliffe | England | MF | 1954–1963 | 260 | 0 | 260 | 19 |
| James Bradley | England | FB | 1898–1915 | 256 | 0 | 256 | 6 |
| Tommy Clare | England | FB | 1883–1897 | 252 | 0 | 252 | 6 |
| Freddie Steele | England | FW | 1933–1949 | 251 | 0 | 251 | 159 |
| Gordon Banks | England | GK | 1967–1972 | 250 | 0 | 250 | 0 |
| Bill Robertson | England | GK | 1952–1960 | 250 | 0 | 250 | 0 |
| Jock Kirton | Scotland | MF | 1936–1952 | 249 | 0 | 249 | 2 |
| Graham Kavanagh | Republic of Ireland | MF | 1996–2001 | 235 | 10 | 245 | 45 |
| George Eastham | England | MF | 1966–1973 | 227 | 13 | 240 | 5 |
| Lárus Sigurðsson | Iceland | DF | 1994–1999 | 225 | 3 | 228 | 7 |
| Joe Schofield | England | FW | 1891–1899 | 227 | 0 | 227 | 93 |
| George Baddeley | England | HB | 1901–1908 | 225 | 0 | 225 | 19 |
| Tommy Sale | England | FW | 1930–1946 | 222 | 0 | 222 | 103 |
| Joe Allen | Wales | MF | 2016–2022 | 211 | 10 | 221 | 20 |
| Billy Tempest | England | MF | 1912–1924 | 217 | 0 | 217 | 31 |
| Wayne Thomas | England | DF | 2000–2005 | 215 | 2 | 217 | 8 |
| Dennis Herod | England | GK | 1946–1953 | 215 | 0 | 215 | 1 |
| Vince Overson | England | DF | 1991–1996 | 212 | 3 | 215 | 7 |
| Davy Brodie | Scotland | HB | 1889–1897 | 213 | 0 | 213 | 3 |
| Steve Bould | England | DF | 1980–1988 | 207 | 4 | 211 | 7 |
| James O'Connor | Republic of Ireland | MF | 1996–2003 | 209 | 2 | 211 | 22 |
| Ray Wallace | England | DF | 1994–1999 | 182 | 29 | 211 | 16 |
| Rory Delap | Republic of Ireland | MF | 2006–2013 | 188 | 20 | 208 | 8 |
| Ricardo Fuller | Jamaica | FW | 2006–2012 | 137 | 71 | 208 | 50 |
| Nigel Gleghorn | England | FW | 1992–1996 | 204 | 4 | 208 | 31 |
| Dennis Viollet | England | FW | 1962–1967 | 206 | 1 | 207 | 66 |
| Erik Pieters | Netherlands | DF | 2013–2019 | 199 | 7 | 206 | 3 |
| Ben Wilmot | England | DF | 2021– | 194 | 12 | 206 | 14 |
| Kevin Keen | England | MF | 1994–2000 | 169 | 34 | 203 | 12 |
| Len Armitage | England | HB | 1924–1932 | 200 | 0 | 200 | 19 |
| Bob Dixon | England | GK | 1922–1928 | 200 | 0 | 200 | 0 |
| Sam Baddeley | England | DF | 1908–1915 | 199 | 0 | 199 | 9 |
| Arthur Tutin | England | HB | 1933–1939 | 198 | 0 | 198 | 3 |
| Norman Wilkinson | England | GK | 1935–1951 | 198 | 0 | 198 | 0 |
| Walter Bussey | England | FW | 1925–1932 | 197 | 0 | 197 | 50 |
| Bobby Cairns | Scotland | MF | 1954–1961 | 196 | 0 | 196 | 11 |
| Freddie Johnson | England | FW | 1895–1903 | 196 | 0 | 196 | 20 |
| Calvin Palmer | England | MF | 1963–1967 | 196 | 0 | 196 | 27 |
| Charlie Burgess | England | FB | 1901–1907 | 195 | 0 | 195 | 0 |
| Billy Mould | England | DF | 1937–1951 | 194 | 0 | 194 | 0 |
| Andy Wilkinson | England | DF | 2001–2015 | 152 | 42 | 194 | 0 |
| Joe Johnson | England | FW | 1931–1937 | 193 | 0 | 193 | 57 |
| John Farmer | England | GK | 1966–1974 | 192 | 1 | 193 | 0 |
| Alexander Ormston | England | MF | 1937–1951 | 192 | 0 | 192 | 30 |
| Carl Saunders | England | FW | 1982–1990 | 151 | 40 | 191 | 30 |
| John Malkin | England | DF | 1947–1956 | 190 | 0 | 190 | 27 |
| George Turner | England | DF | 1908–1914 | 189 | 0 | 189 | 17 |
| Peter Thorne | England | FW | 1997–2001 | 173 | 16 | 189 | 80 |
| Robert Huth | Germany | DF | 2009–2015 | 183 | 5 | 188 | 18 |
| Ernest Mullineux | England | DF | 1907–1914 | 189 | 0 | 187 | 0 |
| Steve Simonsen | England | GK | 2004–2010 | 180 | 7 | 187 | 0 |
| Jack Eccles | England | FB | 1890–1900 | 186 | 0 | 186 | 1 |
| Carl Muggleton | England | GK | 1993–2001 | 185 | 1 | 186 | 0 |
| Mamady Sidibe | Mali | FW | 2005–2013 | 164 | 22 | 186 | 26 |
| Geoff Cameron | United States | MF | 2012–2018 | 167 | 19 | 186 | 2 |
| Frank Soo | England | FW | 1933–1945 | 185 | 0 | 185 | 10 |
| Darel Russell | England | MF | 2003–2008 | 176 | 6 | 182 | 16 |
| Wayne Biggins | England | FW | 1989–1994 | 168 | 13 | 181 | 63 |
| Mike Bernard | England | DF | 1965–1972 | 169 | 12 | 181 | 11 |
| Phil Heath | England | MF | 1983–1988 | 166 | 13 | 179 | 19 |
| Charlie Adam | Scotland | MF | 2012–2019 | 107 | 72 | 179 | 21 |
| Marc Wilson | Republic of Ireland | DF | 2010–2016 | 159 | 19 | 178 | 1 |
| Jordan Thompson | Northern Ireland | MF | 2020–2025 | 119 | 59 | 178 | 4 |
| Matthew Etherington | England | MF | 2009–2014 | 153 | 24 | 177 | 16 |
| Frank Baker | England | FW | 1936–1949 | 174 | 0 | 174 | 33 |
| William Maxwell | Scotland | FW | 1895–1900 | 173 | 0 | 173 | 85 |
| Arthur Watkin | England | FW | 1913–1925 | 172 | 0 | 172 | 74 |
| Asmir Begović | Bosnia and Herzegovina | GK | 2010–2015 | 170 | 2 | 172 | 1 |
| Norman Lewis | England | GK | 1929–1935 | 170 | 0 | 170 | 0 |
| Jack Butland | England | GK | 2013–2020 | 168 | 1 | 169 | 0 |
| Charlie Wilson | England | FW | 1925–1930 | 167 | 0 | 167 | 120 |
| George Clarke | England | HB | 1919–1923 | 165 | 0 | 165 | 4 |
| Graham Shaw | England | FW | 1985–1995 | 124 | 41 | 165 | 29 |
| Garth Crooks | England | FW | 1976–1980 | 154 | 10 | 164 | 52 |
| Tyrese Campbell | England | FW | 2018–2024 | 98 | 66 | 164 | 36 |
| Neil Franklin | England | DF | 1946–1950 | 162 | 0 | 162 | 0 |
| Alan Hudson | England | MF | 1974–1985 | 161 | 1 | 162 | 9 |
| Tom Williamson | Scotland | HB | 1926–1930 | 162 | 0 | 162 | 15 |
| Bjarni Guðjónsson | Iceland | MF | 2000–2003 | 143 | 18 | 161 | 16 |
| Brynjar Gunnarsson | Iceland | MF | 2000–2004 | 155 | 6 | 161 | 20 |
| Dean Whitehead | England | MF | 2009–2013 | 117 | 43 | 160 | 5 |
| Leigh Richmond Roose | Wales | GK | 1901–1907 | 159 | 0 | 159 | 0 |
| George Mountford | England | FW | 1946–1950 | 158 | 0 | 158 | 29 |
| Mame Biram Diouf | Senegal | FW | 2014–2020 | 99 | 58 | 157 | 25 |
| Peter Hampton | England | DF | 1980–1984 | 152 | 4 | 156 | 4 |
| Steven Nzonzi | France | MF | 2012–2015; 2025–2026 | 133 | 18 | 151 | 8 |
| Bobby Howitt | Scotland | HB | 1958–1963 | 150 | 0 | 150 | 16 |
| Alf Smith | England | FW | 1903–1915 | 150 | 0 | 150 | 72 |
| Jimmy O'Neill | Republic of Ireland | GK | 1960–1964 | 149 | 0 | 149 | 0 |
| Sean Haslegrave | England | MF | 1970–1976 | 136 | 10 | 146 | 8 |
| Marko Arnautović | Austria | FW | 2013–2017 | 129 | 16 | 145 | 26 |
| Sammy McIlroy | Northern Ireland | MF | 1982–1985 | 143 | 1 | 144 | 14 |
| Bill Rowley | England | GK | 1887–1896 | 144 | 0 | 144 | 0 |
| Cliff Carr | England | DF | 1987–1991 | 134 | 9 | 143 | 1 |
| Sam Clucas | England | MF | 2018–2023 | 117 | 26 | 143 | 19 |
| Bae Jun-ho | South Korea | MF | 2023– | 103 | 40 | 143 | 8 |
| Paul Richardson | England | MF | 1977–1981 | 137 | 5 | 142 | 11 |
| Paul Bracewell | England | MF | 1979–1983 | 135 | 6 | 141 | 6 |
| William Smith | England | FW | 1909–1913 | 141 | 0 | 141 | 62 |
| Paul Ware | England | MF | 1987–1994 | 115 | 26 | 141 | 14 |
| Jacob Brown | Scotland | FW | 2020–2023 | 106 | 35 | 141 | 30 |
| Jimmy Robertson | Scotland | MF | 1972–1977 | 121 | 19 | 140 | 14 |
| Mart Watkins | Wales | FW | 1900–1908 | 139 | 0 | 139 | 52 |
| Andy Griffin | England | DF | 1996–2010 | 126 | 11 | 137 | 5 |
| Steve Parkin | England | DF | 1983–1989 | 128 | 9 | 137 | 5 |
| Bruno Martins Indi | Netherlands | DF | 2016–2021 | 131 | 6 | 137 | 2 |
| Arthur Beachill | England | FB | 1926–1933 | 136 | 0 | 136 | 0 |
| Davy Christie | Scotland | HB | 1889–1894 | 136 | 0 | 136 | 3 |
| Karl Henry | England | MF | 2000–2006 | 75 | 61 | 136 | 1 |
| William Dickson | Scotland | FW | 1892–1896 | 135 | 0 | 135 | 48 |
| Tony Ford | England | MF | 1986–1989 | 135 | 0 | 135 | 14 |
| Albert Sturgess | England | FB | 1902–1908 | 135 | 0 | 135 | 4 |
| Steve Foley | England | MF | 1992–1994 | 134 | 0 | 134 | 13 |
| Geoff Salmons | England | MF | 1974–1977 | 131 | 3 | 134 | 16 |
| Mark Stein | England | FW | 1992–1997 | 134 | 0 | 134 | 72 |
| Alf Wood | England | HB | 1895–1901 | 134 | 0 | 134 | 10 |
| Charlie Scrimshaw | England | FB | 1929–1938 | 132 | 0 | 132 | 0 |
| Alf Underwood | England | FB | 1887–1893 | 131 | 0 | 131 | 0 |
| Kenwyne Jones | Trinidad and Tobago | FW | 2004–2005; 2010–2014 | 93 | 37 | 130 | 31 |
| Ron Andrew | England | DF | 1957–1963 | 129 | 0 | 129 | 2 |
| Joe Jones | Wales | DF | 1911–1920 | 129 | 0 | 129 | 12 |
| Kyle Lightbourne | Bermuda | FW | 1998–2001 | 100 | 29 | 129 | 25 |
| Thomas Sørensen | Denmark | GK | 2008–2015 | 128 | 1 | 129 | 0 |
| Lewis Baker | England | MF | 2022–2026 | 98 | 31 | 129 | 30 |
| Mike Doyle | England | DF | 1978–1981 | 128 | 0 | 128 | 6 |
| Danny Higginbotham | Gibraltar | DF | 2006–2013 | 125 | 3 | 128 | 14 |
| Tom Robertson | Scotland | DF | 1894–1900 | 128 | 0 | 128 | 3 |
| Neville Coleman | England | FW | 1953–1958 | 126 | 0 | 126 | 52 |
| Geoff Hurst | England | FW | 1972–1975 | 123 | 5 | 126 | 37 |
| William Robertson | Scotland | DF | 1929–1933 | 126 | 0 | 126 | 3 |
| Liam Lawrence | Republic of Ireland | MF | 2006–2010 | 108 | 17 | 125 | 24 |
| Keith Bebbington | England | FW | 1962–1966 | 123 | 1 | 124 | 22 |
| Mark Chamberlain | England | MF | 1982–1985 | 122 | 2 | 124 | 18 |
| Tom Brittleton | England | FB | 1920–1925 | 123 | 0 | 123 | 5 |
| Paul Dyson | England | DF | 1983–1986 | 123 | 0 | 123 | 5 |
| Sam Higginson | England | U | 1899–1904 | 123 | 0 | 123 | 23 |
| Ian Painter | England | FW | 1982–1986 | 114 | 9 | 123 | 24 |
| Josh Tymon | England | DF | 2017–2023 | 99 | 23 | 122 | 4 |
| Arthur Griffiths | England | FW | 1905–1912 | 121 | 0 | 121 | 51 |
| Peter Shilton | England | GK | 1974–1977 | 121 | 0 | 121 | 0 |
| Paul Maguire | Scotland | MF | 1980–1984 | 105 | 15 | 120 | 25 |
| Mickey Thomas | Wales | MF | 1983–1991 | 113 | 7 | 120 | 22 |
| Harry Brigham | England | FB | 1936–1946 | 119 | 0 | 119 | 0 |
| Martin Carruthers | England | FW | 1993–1996 | 80 | 39 | 119 | 20 |
| Adrian Heath | England | MF | 1979–1982 | 115 | 3 | 118 | 17 |
| Nick Powell | England | MF | 2019–2023 | 90 | 28 | 118 | 28 |
| Jimmy Broad | England | FW | 1921–1923 | 116 | 0 | 116 | 67 |
| Jimmy McIlroy | Northern Ireland | MF | 1963–1965 | 114 | 2 | 116 | 19 |
| Alan Martin | England | U | 1951–1955 | 115 | 0 | 115 | 6 |
| Nicky Mohan | England | DF | 1999–2001 | 115 | 0 | 115 | 7 |
| Dave Brammer | England | MF | 2005–2007 | 96 | 16 | 112 | 3 |
| Roger Jones | England | GK | 1977–1980 | 112 | 0 | 112 | 0 |
| Gerry Bridgwood | England | MF | 1960–1968 | 106 | 5 | 111 | 8 |
| George Kinnell | Scotland | DF | 1963–1966 | 109 | 2 | 111 | 8 |
| Toddy Orlygsson | Iceland | MF | 1993–1995 | 107 | 4 | 111 | 19 |
| Willie Stevenson | Scotland | MF | 1967–1973 | 98 | 13 | 111 | 7 |
| James McClean | Republic of Ireland | MF | 2018–2021 | 92 | 19 | 111 | 12 |
| Dickie Smith | England | HB | 1919–1922 | 110 | 0 | 110 | 2 |
| George Bourne | England | DF | 1952–1956 | 109 | 0 | 109 | 1 |
| Ross Fielding | England | MF | 1902–1908 | 109 | 0 | 109 | 12 |
| Dennis Wilshaw | England | FW | 1957–1961 | 109 | 0 | 109 | 50 |
| Million Manhoef | Netherlands | FW | 2024– | 80 | 29 | 109 | 18 |
| Richard Forsyth | England | MF | 1996–1999 | 102 | 6 | 108 | 18 |
| Chris Maskery | England | MF | 1982–1987 | 96 | 12 | 108 | 5 |
| Lee Chapman | England | FW | 1978–1982 | 103 | 4 | 107 | 38 |
| Danny Batth | England | DF | 2019–2022 | 101 | 6 | 107 | 6 |
| Salif Diao | Senegal | MF | 2006–2012 | 82 | 24 | 106 | 1 |
| Syd Peppitt | England | MF | 1936–1950 | 106 | 0 | 106 | 29 |
| Tommy Smith | England | DF | 2019–2022 | 99 | 7 | 106 | 3 |
| Ray Evans | England | DF | 1979–1982 | 105 | 0 | 105 | 2 |
| Chris Hemming | England | MF | 1984–1989 | 96 | 9 | 105 | 2 |
| Nicky Morgan | England | FW | 1986–1990 | 88 | 16 | 104 | 26 |
| Keith Bertschin | England | FW | 1984–1987 | 93 | 10 | 103 | 33 |
| Chris Iwelumo | Scotland | FW | 2000–2004 | 52 | 51 | 103 | 22 |
| Tom Ince | England | MF | 2018–2022 | 80 | 23 | 103 | 14 |
| Andy Cooke | England | FW | 2000–2003 | 78 | 24 | 102 | 23 |
| Michael Duberry | England | DF | 2004–2007 | 102 | 0 | 102 | 1 |
| Dave Kevan | Scotland | MF | 1990–1993 | 96 | 6 | 102 | 2 |
| Amos Baddeley | England | FW | 1907–1912 | 101 | 0 | 101 | 56 |
| Alex Elder | Northern Ireland | DF | 1967–1972 | 95 | 6 | 101 | 1 |
| Willie Naughton | Scotland | FW | 1890–1895 | 101 | 0 | 101 | 25 |
| Mark Prudhoe | England | GK | 1993–1997 | 100 | 1 | 101 | 0 |
| Roy Vernon | Wales | FW | 1965–1970 | 97 | 3 | 100 | 24 |
| Gavin Ward | England | GK | 1999–2002 | 100 | 0 | 100 | 0 |

== Notes ==
- A utility player is one who is considered to play in more than one position.
