= George Harris (footballer, born 1877) =

English footballer

Personal information
- Date of birth: 1877
- Place of birth: Rocester, England
- Height: 5 ft 10 in (1.78 m)
- Position: Inside left

Senior career*
Years	Team	Apps	(Gls)
- Uttoxeter Town
1900–1904	Stoke	23	(5)
1904–1905	Reading		
1905–1907	Southampton	48	(9)
1908–19??	Tutbury Town		
- * Club domestic league appearances and goals

George Harris (born 1877) was an English professional footballer who played at inside-left for various clubs in the 1900s.

== Football career ==
Harris was born in Rocester, Staffordshire and started his football career at nearby Uttoxeter, from where he joined the local Football League First Division side, Stoke in November 1900.

At Stoke, he was initially used as cover for Scotland international Willie Maxwell, who had been a regular fixture at inside-left for six seasons. After Maxwell left Stoke in 1901, Harris had more opportunities and made 15 appearances, scoring three goals, in the 1901–02 season. For the following season, Stoke recruited Arthur Capes from Nottingham Forest and Harris once again became only an occasional player, often at outside-right, spending the whole of the 1903–04 season in the reserves. In his four years with Stoke, Harris made only 23 appearances, scoring five goals.

In 1904, he moved to Southern League Reading where his career "blossomed", scoring eleven goals in 28 games, resulting in an international trial.

In April 1905, he was one of nine players signed by fellow Southern League side, Southampton. The "Saints" were anxious to regain the Southern League title which they had taken six times in the eight years up to 1904, but had finished in a disappointing third place at the end of 1904–05. Harris made his Southampton debut in the opening match of the 1905–06 season, a 1–0 defeat at home to Brentford, but after two games was replaced by Harry Brown. For the rest of the season, the No. 10 shirt would alternate between Brown and Harris. Once settled into the side, Harris "developed into a consistent striker, with a powerful and accurate shot". In his first season at The Dell, Harris made twenty appearances, scoring four goals, as the Saints finished as runners-up, five points behind champions Fulham.

Harry Brown moved to Newcastle United in the summer of 1906, enabling Harris to establish himself as the first-choice at inside-left. In the 1906–07 season, Harris formed an effective striking partnership with Fred Harrison and Alex Glen, scoring five goals from 28 league appearances, as the Saints finished eleventh, their lowest placing since the inauguration of the Southern league in 1894. Two of his goals came in a 5–0 victory over Brentford on 18 March 1907.

== Later career ==
In the summer of 1907, Harris decided to retire and became the landlord of a public house at Tutbury, near Burton upon Trent. In 1908, a year after his "retirement", he turned out for his home-town side in the Burton & District League.

== Career statistics ==
Appearances and goals by club, season and competition
Club	Season	League			FA Cup		Total	
Club	Season	Division	Apps	Goals	Apps	Goals	Apps	Goals
Stoke	1900–01	First Division	1	0	0	0	1	0
Stoke	1901–02	First Division	15	3	0	0	15	3
Stoke	1902–03	First Division	7	2	0	0	7	2
Stoke	1903–04	First Division	0	0	0	0	0	0
Southampton	1905–06	Southern League	20	4	0	0	20	4
Southampton	1906–07	Southern League	28	5	0	0	28	5
Career total			71	14	0	0	71	14
