= 1905–06 Stoke F.C. season =

Stoke
1905–06 season
- Chairman: Mr W Cowlishaw
- Manager: Horace Austerberry
- Stadium: Victoria Ground
- Football League First Division: 10th (39 Points)
- FA Cup: Second Round
- Top goalscorer: League: Jack Hall (11); All: Jack Hall (11)
- Highest home attendance: 20,000 vs Liverpool (26 December 1905)
- Lowest home attendance: 4,000 vs Bury (26 March 1906)
- Average home league attendance: 8,610
Home colours

The 1905–06 season was Stoke's 17th season in the Football League.

It was a good season for Stoke as they started well winning their first five matches and with a number of good local players in the team playing regularly. Stoke's form did eventually drop and they finished in 10th position a much improved finish from previous seasons. However it would be a case of 'calm before the storm' for Stoke and their supporters.

== Season review ==
=== League ===
For the 1905–06 season, the First Division was extended to 20 clubs. Stoke enticed goalkeeper Leigh Richmond Roose back to the club whilst James Bradley departed for Liverpool. The 'Potters' started the season off in fine style winning their opening five matches to go top of the league table for the first time in their history–and they remained there for five weeks. Horace Austerberry seemed to have found the right line-up and managed to keep it settled for the first seven matches. The crowds improved steadily and they reached the 12,000 mark as Stoke began to play well at home.

In early November Sheffield Wednesday were well beaten 4–0 with Ted Holdcroft scoring twice, to bring his goals tally to six in ten games unfortunately for Holcroft it was also his final goals of the season. Stoke's decent form continued but George Baddeley injured his knee on boxing day and Stoke's form began to drop. They eventually finished in 10th position with 39 points 12 behind champions Liverpool.

=== FA Cup ===
Stoke again went out of the cup in the second round this time losing 1–0 to Birmingham after beating Blackburn Rovers by the same score.

== Final league table ==
Pos	Team	Pld	W	D	L	GF	GA	GAv	Pts
8	Aston Villa	38	17	6	15	72	56	1.286	40
9	Blackburn Rovers	38	16	8	14	54	52	1.038	40
10	Stoke	38	16	7	15	54	55	0.982	39
11	Everton	38	15	7	16	70	66	1.061	37
12	Woolwich Arsenal	38	15	7	16	62	64	0.969	37

Source: World Football
Rules for classification: 1) Points; 2) Goal average; 3) Goals scored

== Results ==
Stoke's score comes first

=== Legend ===
Win	Draw	Loss

=== Football League First Division ===
Match	Date	Opponent	Venue	Result	Attendance	Scorers
1	2 September 1905	Notts County	H	3–0	8,000	Holdcroft, Hall, Rouse
2	4 September 1905	Blackburn Rovers	H	3–0	8,000	Holdcroft, Hall (2)
3	9 September 1905	Wolverhampton Wanderers	A	2–1	7,000	Holdcroft, Hall
4	16 September 1905	Bolton Wanderers	A	2–1	16,000	Rouse, Miller
5	23 September 1905	Woolwich Arsenal	H	2–1	15,000	Rouse, Miller
6	30 September 1905	Blackburn Rovers	A	0–3	20,000	
7	7 October 1905	Sunderland	H	1–0	9,000	Miller
8	14 October 1905	Birmingham	A	0–2	12,000	
9	21 October 1905	Everton	H	2–2	12,000	Holford, Hall
10	28 October 1905	Derby County	A	0–1	10,000	
11	4 November 1905	The Wednesday	H	4–0	12,000	Rouse, Hall, Holdcroft (2)
12	11 November 1905	Nottingham Forest	A	1–3	10,000	Hall
13	13 November 1905	Aston Villa	H	0–1	12,000	
14	18 November 1905	Manchester City	H	0–0	8,000	
15	25 November 1905	Bury	A	0–3	4,000	
16	2 December 1905	Middlesbrough	H	1–1	6,000	Gallimore
17	9 December 1905	Preston North End	A	0–2	8,000	
18	16 December 1905	Newcastle United	H	1–0	8,000	Jones
19	23 December 1905	Aston Villa	A	0–3	15,000	
20	25 December 1905	Sheffield United	A	1–1	21,883	Hall
21	26 December 1905	Liverpool	H	2–1	20,000	Hall, Holford
22	30 December 1905	Notts County	A	1–1	5,000	Jones
23	1 January 1906	Liverpool	A	1–3	25,000	Hall
24	6 January 1906	Wolverhampton Wanderers	H	4–0	6,000	Hall, Rouse, Fielding, Croxton
25	20 January 1906	Bolton Wanderers	H	1–2	6,000	Baddeley
26	27 January 1906	Woolwich Arsenal	A	2–1	10,000	Rouse (2)
27	10 February 1906	Sunderland	A	0–1	10,000	
28	17 February 1906	Birmingham	H	2–2	6,000	Rouse, Jones
29	3 March 1906	Derby County	H	2–2	9,000	Gallimore, Chalmers
30	17 March 1906	Nottingham Forest	H	4–0	8,500	Chalmers (2), Miller (2)
31	24 March 1906	Manchester City	A	0–2	6,000	
32	26 March 1906	Bury	H	4–2	4,000	Baddeley, Fielding, Gallimore (2)
33	3 April 1906	Everton	A	3–0	15,000	Gallimore, Rouse, Griffiths
34	7 April 1906	Middlesbrough	A	0–5	12,000	
35	9 April 1906	The Wednesday	A	0–2	10,000	
36	14 April 1906	Preston North End	H	3–0	10,000	Rouse, Chalmers, Baddeley
37	16 April 1906	Sheffield United	H	2–1	8,000	Chalmers, Gallimore
38	24 April 1906	Newcastle United	A	0–5	12,000	

=== FA Cup ===
Round	Date	Opponent	Venue	Result	Attendance	Scorers
R1	13 January 1906	Blackburn Rovers	H	1–0	15,463	Sturgess
R2	3 February 1906	Birmingham	A	0–1	19,000	

== Squad statistics ==
Pos.	Name	League		FA Cup		Total	
Pos.	Name	Apps	Goals	Apps	Goals	Apps	Goals
GK	(England) Jack Benton	1	0	0	0	1	0
GK	(Wales) Leigh Richmond Roose	33	0	2	0	35	0
GK	(England) Jack Whitley	4	0	0	0	4	0
FB	(England) Harry Benson	36	0	2	0	38	0
FB	(England) Charlie Burgess	35	0	2	0	37	0
HB	(England) George Baddeley	34	4	2	0	36	4
HB	(England) Harry Croxton	16	1	2	0	18	1
HB	(Wales) Lloyd Davies	2	0	0	0	2	0
HB	(England) Tom Holford	36	2	2	0	38	2
HB	(England) Albert Sturgess	37	0	2	1	39	1
FW	(England) Adrian Capes	6	0	0	0	6	0
FW	(Scotland) Jackie Chalmers	5	5	0	0	5	5
FW	(Wales) Billy Davies	4	0	0	0	4	0
FW	(England) Ross Fielding	28	2	1	0	29	2
FW	(England) George Gallimore	20	5	1	0	21	5
FW	(England) Arthur Griffiths	5	1	0	0	5	1
FW	(England) Jack Hall	28	11	2	0	30	11
FW	(England) Ted Holdcroft	11	5	0	0	11	5
FW	(Wales) John Love Jones	11	3	0	0	11	3
FW	(England) Jack Miller	36	5	2	0	38	5
FW	(England) Fred Rouse	28	10	2	0	30	10
FW	(England) Alf Smith	2	0	0	0	2	0
