= George Lawton (footballer, born 1880) =

English footballer

Personal information
- Full name: George Lawton
- Date of birth: 1880
- Place of birth: Tunstall, Staffordshire, England
- Position: Goalkeeper

Senior career*
Years	Team	Apps	(Gls)
1896–1898	Burslem Port Vale	16	(0)
- Porthill
1901	Stoke	1	(0)
- Tunstall
- Porthill
- * Club domestic league appearances and goals

George Lawton (born 1880; date of death unknown) was an English footballer who played in the Football League for Stoke.

== Career ==
Lawton was born in Tunstall, Staffordshire and joined Burslem Port Vale in April 1896. He made his debut at the Athletic Ground on 20 February 1897, in an 8–0 win over Grantham Rovers in the Midland League. He lost his first-team place in October 1897 and left the club the following year. He then played for local amateur club Porthill. He played one match for Stoke in 1901–02 as first choice 'keeper Tom Wilkes was injured and Lawton played against Bury on 12 October 1901 where he conceded four goals in a 4–2 defeat. He returned to amateur football with Tunstall and then Porthill again.

== Career statistics ==
Appearances and goals by club, season and competition
Club	Season	League			FA Cup		Total	
Club	Season	Division	Apps	Goals	Apps	Goals	Apps	Goals
Burslem Port Vale	1896–97	Midland League	9	0	0	0	9	0
Burslem Port Vale	1897–98	Midland League	7	0	0	0	7	0
Burslem Port Vale	Total		16	0	0	0	16	0
Stoke	1901–02	First Division	1	0	0	0	1	0
Career total			17	0	0	0	17	0
