= Harry Benson (footballer) =

English footballer

Personal information
- Full name: Harry Lewis Benson
- Date of birth: 22 January 1883
- Place of birth: Hartshill, Staffordshire, England
- Date of death: 1953 (aged 70)
- Position: Full-back

Youth career
- Shelton Albion
- Porthill

Senior career*
Years	Team	Apps	(Gls)
1901–1907	Stoke	87	(0)
1907–1908	Northampton Town		
1908–1911	Port Vale	43	(0)
Total		130+	(0+)
- * Club domestic league appearances and goals

Harry Lewis Benson (22 January 1883 – 1953) was an English footballer who played for Stoke, Northampton Town and Port Vale.

== Career ==
Benson played for non-League Shelton Albion and Porthill before joining the local Football League side Stoke in 1901. It took him three seasons before he could become a regular under Horace Austerberry; he took over from the injured Charlie Burgess in 1904–05, making 27 appearances. He partnered Burgess in 1905–06 with the pair missing only five games between them. He played six matches in 1906–07 as Stoke were relegated from the First Division, and then departed the Victoria Ground. Benson then moved to Southern League side Northampton Town. He then moved on to the newly reformed Port Vale in December 1908. His first game was against the reserve team of Stoke, Vale's rivals and Benson's old club; Vale lost 2–1. He was their first-choice left-back between December 1908 and December 1910, but was released in 1911 with 43 North Staffs League appearances to his name.

== Career statistics ==
Appearances and goals by club, season and competition
Club	Season	League			FA Cup		Total	
Club	Season	Division	Apps	Goals	Apps	Goals	Apps	Goals
Stoke	1901–02	First Division	1	0	0	0	1	0
Stoke	1902–03	First Division	6	0	0	0	6	0
Stoke	1903–04	First Division	13	0	0	0	13	0
Stoke	1904–05	First Division	25	0	2	0	27	0
Stoke	1905–06	First Division	36	0	2	0	38	0
Stoke	1906–07	First Division	6	0	0	0	6	0
Stoke	Total		87	0	4	0	91	0
Port Vale	1908–09	North Staffs League	14	0	0	0	14	0
Port Vale	1909–10	North Staffs League	18	0	0	0	18	0
Port Vale	1910–11	North Staffs League	11	0	0	0	11	0
Port Vale	Total		43	0	0	0	43	0
Career total			130	0	4	0	134	0
