= John Love Jones =

Welsh footballer

John Jones
Personal information
- Full name: John Love Jones
- Date of birth: 1885
- Place of birth: Rhyl, Wales
- Date of death: 21 December 1913 (aged 28)
- Position: Forward

Senior career*
Years	Team	Apps	(Gls)
1903–1905	Rhyl		
1905–1907	Stoke	13	(3)
1907–1909	Crewe Alexandra		
1909–1910	Middlesbrough	14	(0)
1910–1913	Portsmouth	41	(19)
Total		68	(22)

International career
1906–1910	Wales	2	(1)
- * Club domestic league appearances and goals

John Love Jones (1885 – 21 December 1913) was a Welsh footballer who played in the English Football League for Stoke and Middlesbrough, and he also made two appearances for Wales.

== Career ==
Jones began his career with home town club Rhyl before joining Stoke in 1905. He played 11 matches for Stoke in 1905–06 scoring three goals, but after only playing in two matches in 1906–07 he was allowed to join Crewe Alexandra. He re-entered league football with Middlesbrough in 1908 but left for Portsmouth after failing to score. At "Pompey" he scored 19 goals in 41 matches before his death on 13 December at the age of 28.

His made his Welsh debut whilst with Stoke in 1906, in a 2–0 victory against Scotland, with Jones scoring one of the goals. His second and final cap came against Ireland in 1910, in a 4–1 Welsh win.

== Career statistics ==
=== Club ===
Club	Season	League			FA Cup		Total	
Club	Season	Division	Apps	Goals	Apps	Goals	Apps	Goals
Stoke	1905–06	First Division	11	3	0	0	11	3
Stoke	1906–07	First Division	2	0	0	0	2	0
Middlesbrough	1908–09	First Division	3	0	0	0	3	0
Middlesbrough	1909–10	First Division	11	0	0	0	11	0
Career Total			27	3	0	0	27	3

=== International ===
National team	Year	Apps	Goals
Wales	1906	1	1
Wales	1910	1	0
Total		2	1
