= Andy Clark (footballer) =

Scottish footballer

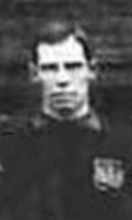
- Clark while with Leeds City in 1906.

Personal information
- Full name: Andrew Clark
- Date of birth: 7 October 1879
- Place of birth: Ballingry, Scotland
- Date of death: 10 August 1940
- Place of death: Wemyss, Scotland
- Position: Left back

Senior career*
Years	Team	Apps	(Gls)
1897–1898	Hamilton Academical	0	(0)
1898–1899	Buckhaven United		
1899–1901	Heart of Midlothian	31	(0)
1901–1902	Stoke	52	(0)
1902–1903	East Fife		
1903–1906	Plymouth Argyle	129	(1)
1906–1907	Leeds City	24	(0)
1907–1908	Brentford	23	(0)
1908–1909	Southend United		
Total		238	(1)
- * Club domestic league appearances and goals

Andrew Clark (7 October 1879 – 10 August 1940) was a Scottish professional footballer who played as a left back in the Football League for Leeds City and Stoke.

== Career ==
Clark was born in Ballingry and played for Hamilton Academical, Buckhaven United and Heart of Midlothian, before joining English club Stoke in 1901. He spent two seasons at Stoke, making 37 appearances in 1901–02 and 22 in 1902–03, before returning to Scotland to join East Fife. He re-entered English football with Southern League club Plymouth Argyle in 1903, for whom he made 143 appearances in three seasons. He then spent the 1906–07, 1907–08 and 1908–09 seasons with Leeds City, Brentford and Southend United respectively.

== Career statistics ==
Appearances and goals by club, season and competition
Club	Season	League			National Cup		Total	
Club	Season	Division	Apps	Goals	Apps	Goals	Apps	Goals
Heart of Midlothian	1899–00	Scottish League First Division	16	0	6	0	22	0
Heart of Midlothian	1900–01	Scottish League First Division	15	0	2	0	17	0
Heart of Midlothian	Total		31	0	8	0	39	0
Stoke	1901–02	First Division	34	0	3	0	37	0
Stoke	1902–03	First Division	18	0	4	0	22	0
Stoke	Total		52	0	7	0	59	0
Plymouth Argyle	1903–04	Southern League First Division	45	0	7	0	52	0
Plymouth Argyle	1904–05	Southern League First Division	47	0	4	0	51	0
Plymouth Argyle	1905–06	Southern League First Division	37	1	3	0	40	1
Plymouth Argyle	Total		129	1	14	0	143	1
Leeds City	1906–07	Second Division	24	0	0	0	24	0
Brentford	1907–08	Southern League First Division	23	0	2	0	25	0
Career Total			228	1	23	0	251	1
