= Charlie Hinks =

English footballer

Personal information
- Full name: Charles William Hinks
- Date of birth: 28 April 1880
- Place of birth: Manchester, England
- Date of death: 1956 (aged 76)
- Position: Forward

Senior career*
Years	Team	Apps	(Gls)
1900	Darwen		
1901–1902	Stockport County	1	(0)
1902–1903	Manchester City	0	(0)
1903–1904	Stoke	1	(0)
1904–1906	Altrincham		
1906	Southport Central		
1907	Hyde		
1908	Haslingden		
1909	Sale Holmfield		
1910	Eccles United		
- * Club domestic league appearances and goals

Charles William Hinks (28 April 1880 – 1956) was an English footballer who played in the Football League for Stockport County and Stoke.

== Career ==
Hinks started his football career with Darwen and then joined Stockport County where he managed one appearance in the Football League. He joined Manchester City in 1902 and failed to get a game and joined Stoke where again he managed just a single appearance.

== Personal life ==
Hinks served in the Royal Naval Air Service and the Royal Navy during the First World War. He finished the war as a corporal clerk in the Royal Air Force.

== Career statistics ==
Appearances and goals by club, season and competition
Club	Season	League			FA Cup		Total	
Club	Season	Division	Apps	Goals	Apps	Goals	Apps	Goals
Stockport County	1901–02	Second Division	1	0	0	0	1	0
Stoke	1903–04	First Division	1	0	0	0	1	0
Career total			2	0	0	0	2	0
