= Jack Miller (footballer) =

English footballer

Personal information
- Full name: Thomas John Miller
- Date of birth: 11 March 1875
- Place of birth: Hednesford, England
- Date of death: 1949 (aged 74)
- Position: Left wing

Senior career*
Years	Team	Apps	(Gls)
1895	Hednesford Town		
1896–1905	Wolverhampton Wanderers	251	(47)
1905–1907	Stoke	59	(5)
1907–1910	Willenhall		
Total		310	(52)
- * Club domestic league appearances and goals

Thomas John Miller (11 March 1875 – 1949) was an English footballer, who played for Wolverhampton Wanderers and Stoke.

== Career ==
Miller started with Hednesford Town before joining League side Wolverhampton Wanderers in 1896. He soon became a regular at left wing for Wolves as they side enjoyed a good spell in the late 1890s finishing in the top ten in three seasons running. The early 1900s saw Wolves finish in mid-table quite often and in 1905 Miller ended his 10-year spell at the club by agreeing to join Staffordshire rivals Stoke. In total Miller had played 269 times for Wolves scoring 49 goals. At Stoke he played 38 times in 1905–06 scoring five goals and made 25 appearances in 1906–07 but Stoke finished bottom of the First Division and were relegated. Miller's contract was not renewed and he decided to join Willenhall.

== Career statistics ==
Appearances and goals by club, season and competition
Club	Season	League			FA Cup		Total	
Club	Season	Division	Apps	Goals	Apps	Goals	Apps	Goals
Wolverhampton Wanderers	1895–96	First Division	2	0	0	0	2	0
Wolverhampton Wanderers	1896–97	First Division	19	7	2	0	21	7
Wolverhampton Wanderers	1897–98	First Division	29	4	2	0	31	4
Wolverhampton Wanderers	1898–99	First Division	33	12	3	0	36	12
Wolverhampton Wanderers	1899–1900	First Division	30	3	2	1	32	4
Wolverhampton Wanderers	1900–01	First Division	28	5	3	0	31	5
Wolverhampton Wanderers	1901–02	First Division	30	4	1	0	31	4
Wolverhampton Wanderers	1902–03	First Division	34	5	1	0	35	5
Wolverhampton Wanderers	1903–04	First Division	30	6	4	1	34	7
Wolverhampton Wanderers	1904–05	First Division	16	1	0	0	16	1
Wolverhampton Wanderers	Total		251	47	18	2	269	49
Stoke	1905–06	First Division	36	5	2	0	38	5
Stoke	1906–07	First Division	23	0	2	0	25	0
Stoke	Total		59	5	4	0	63	5
Career total			310	52	22	2	332	54
