= 1902–03 Stoke F.C. season =

Stoke
1902–03 season
- Chairman: Mr W Cowlishaw
- Manager: Horace Austerberry
- Stadium: Victoria Ground
- Football League First Division: 6th (37 Points)
- FA Cup: Third Round
- Top goalscorer: League: Mart Watkins (12); All: Mart Watkins (13)
- Highest home attendance: 15,000 vs The Wednesday (29 November 1902)
- Lowest home attendance: 5,000 vs Bolton Wanderers (18 April 1903)
- Average home league attendance: 8,050
Home colours

The 1902–03 season was Stoke's 14th season in the Football League.

After two seasons of narrow escapes the 1902–03 season provided Stoke fans a welcome relief as they finished in sixth place and could have won the league but failed to win their last four fixtures.

== Season review ==
=== League ===
After a couple of desolate campaigns it did seem that the 1902–03 season would, bring some progress as the club attempted to build on a somewhat poor defence. A fine half-back was now taking shape with Tom Holford flanked by local players George Baddeley and James Bradley. This trio played together 74 times for Stoke at senior level and became a formidable midfield three. But perhaps the most significant signing at this time was that of 27-year-old inside-left Arthur Capes signed from Nottingham Forest. He became captain of the side and provided a useful number of goals for Stoke in his two seasons with the club. The directors also visited Scotland, again to sign Jack Forrest from Motherwell but after scoring twice on his debut against Wolverhampton Wanderers he was unable to settle in the Potteries and left for Bradford.

An ultimate sixth-place finish in the table does not exaggerate the work put in by both Cowlishaw and Austerberry for this was Stoke's best season so far in League football. In fact after a hard fought 0–0 away at Sunderland on Good Friday, Stoke were lying fourth and had a mathematical chance of taking the title. But they only won one of their remaining four games allowing Sheffield Wednesday to win the league.

=== FA Cup ===
In the FA Cup Stoke accounted for Glossop and Nottingham Forest before bowing out 3–0 to Derby County.

== Final league table ==
Pos	Team	Pld	W	D	L	GF	GA	GAv	Pts
4	Sheffield United	34	17	5	12	58	44	1.318	39
5	Liverpool	34	17	4	13	68	49	1.388	38
6	Stoke	34	15	7	12	46	38	1.211	37
7	West Bromwich Albion	34	16	4	14	54	53	1.019	36
8	Bury	34	16	3	15	54	43	1.256	35

Source: World Football
Rules for classification: 1) Points; 2) Goal average; 3) Goals scored

== Results ==
Stoke's score comes first

=== Legend ===
Win	Draw	Loss

=== Football League First Division ===
Match	Date	Opponent	Venue	Result	Attendance	Scorers
1	6 September 1902	Newcastle United	A	0–5	15,000	
2	13 September 1902	Wolverhampton Wanderers	H	3–0	10,000	Forrest (2), Higginson
3	15 September 1902	Notts County	H	0–2	8,000	
4	20 September 1902	Liverpool	A	1–1	10,000	Forrest
5	27 September 1902	Sheffield United	H	0–1	10,000	
6	4 October 1902	Grimsby Town	A	2–2	5,000	Watkins, Capes
7	11 October 1902	Aston Villa	H	1–0	10,000	Watkins
8	18 October 1902	Nottingham Forest	A	3–1	8,000	Watkins, Capes, Whitehouse
9	25 October 1902	Bury	H	1–0	12,000	Watkins
10	1 November 1902	Blackburn Rovers	A	1–1	3,000	Holford
11	8 November 1902	Sunderland	H	1–1	7,000	Baddeley
12	15 November 1902	Derby County	H	2–0	7,000	Watkins (2)
13	22 November 1902	Everton	A	1–0	18,000	Whitehouse
14	29 November 1902	The Wednesday	H	4–0	15,000	Whitehouse, Bradley, Watkins, Johnson
15	6 December 1902	West Bromwich Albion	A	1–2	11,235	Bradley
16	20 December 1902	Bolton Wanderers	A	3–2	5,000	Whitehouse (3)
17	25 December 1902	Bury	A	1–2	4,000	Watkins
18	26 December 1902	Blackburn Rovers	H	0–2	10,000	
19	27 December 1902	Middlesbrough	H	0–2	6,000	
20	3 January 1903	Newcastle United	H	5–0	8,000	Watkins, Capes, Lockett (2), Baddeley
21	10 January 1903	Wolverhampton Wanderers	A	0–1	6,000	
22	17 January 1903	Liverpool	H	1–0	7,000	Johnson
23	24 January 1903	Sheffield United	A	3–1	12,000	Watkins, Capes, Whitehouse
24	31 January 1903	Grimsby Town	H	1–1	10,000	Capes
25	14 February 1903	Nottingham Forest	H	3–2	8,000	Capes, Watkins, Higginson
26	14 March 1903	Derby County	A	0–2	6,000	
27	21 March 1903	Everton	H	2–0	6,000	Higginson, Holford
28	28 March 1903	The Wednesday	A	0–1	7,000	
29	4 April 1903	West Bromwich Albion	H	3–0	5,500	Higginson, Watkins, Whitehouse
30	10 April 1903	Sunderland	A	0–0	20,000	
31	11 April 1903	Notts County	A	0–3	7,000	
32	13 April 1903	Aston Villa	A	0–2	10,000	
33	18 April 1903	Bolton Wanderers	H	2–0	5,000	Capes, Harris
34	25 April 1903	Middlesbrough	A	1–1	10,000	Harris

=== FA Cup ===
Round	Date	Opponent	Venue	Result	Attendance	Scorers
R1	7 February 1903	Glossop	A	3–2	2,000	Watkins, Whitehouse, Capes
R2	21 February 1903	Nottingham Forest	H	0–0	25,000	
R2 Replay	26 February 1903	Nottingham Forest	A	2–0	24,850	Capes, Baddeley
R3	7 March 1903	Derby County	A	0–3	16,00	

== Squad statistics ==
Pos.	Name	League		FA Cup		Total	
Pos.	Name	Apps	Goals	Apps	Goals	Apps	Goals
GK	(Wales) Leigh Richmond Roose	25	0	3	0	28	0
GK	(England) Herbert Salt	1	0	0	0	1	0
GK	(England) Tom Wilkes	8	0	1	0	9	0
FB	(England) Harry Benson	6	0	0	0	6	0
FB	(England) Charlie Burgess	31	0	4	0	35	0
FB	(England) Bill Capewell	1	0	0	0	1	0
FB	(Scotland) Andy Clark	18	0	4	0	22	0
FB	(England) Arthur Hartshorne	4	0	0	0	4	0
FB	(Wales) Sam Meredith	6	0	0	0	6	0
FB	(England) Herbert Smith	3	0	0	0	3	0
HB	(England) Samuel Ashworth	9	0	1	0	10	0
HB	(England) George Baddeley	30	2	3	1	33	3
HB	(England) James Bradley	29	2	4	0	33	2
HB	(England) Ted Holdcroft	1	0	0	0	1	0
HB	(England) Tom Holford	33	2	4	0	37	2
HB	(England) Albert Sturgess	1	0	0	0	1	0
HB	(England) Sam Whittingham	0	0	0	0	0	0
FW	(England) Arthur Bridgett	7	0	0	0	7	0
FW	(England) Arthur Capes	32	7	4	2	36	9
FW	(Scotland) Jack Forrest	6	3	0	0	6	3
FW	(England) George Harris	7	2	0	0	7	2
FW	(England) Sam Higginson	12	4	3	0	15	4
FW	(England) Freddie Johnson	23	2	1	0	24	2
FW	(England) Arthur Lockett	22	2	4	0	26	2
FW	(England) Ben Prosser	1	0	0	0	1	0
FW	(Wales) Mart Watkins	29	12	4	1	33	13
FW	(England) Frank Whitehouse	29	8	4	1	33	9
