= Ted Holdcroft =

English footballer

Personal information
- Full name: Hugh Edward Holdcroft
- Date of birth: c. 1882
- Place of birth: Stoke-upon-Trent, England
- Date of death: 4 February 1952 (age 69-70)
- Place of death: Norton le Moors, England
- Position: Utility player

Senior career*
Years	Team	Apps	(Gls)
1901–1903	Burslem Port Vale	16	(1)
1903–1905	Stoke	43	(11)
Total		59	(12)
- * Club domestic league appearances and goals

Hugh Edward Holdcroft (c. 1882 – 4 February 1952) was an English footballer who played in the Football League for Burslem Port Vale and Stoke in the early 1900s.

== Career ==
Holdcroft joined Burslem Port Vale in October 1901. His debut came at centre-half in a goalless draw with Preston North End at the Athletic Ground on 8 September 1902. He scored his first goal in the Football League on 25 October, converting a penalty in a 3–3 draw with Burnley at Turf Moor. He became a first-team regular for the Second Division side from the next month until he suffered a toe injury in February 1903 and transferred to local rivals Stoke in March 1903. At £500 this was a club record for Stoke.

Holdcroft was converted into a centre forward at the Victoria Ground with mixed success. He hit two goals in a 5–2 win over Liverpool on 17 October 1903, and opened the 1905–06 season with a goal in each of the first three First Division games. Still, other than these highlights, he proved to be far from a natural goalscorer and in three seasons, he scored 11 goals in 44 appearances. After retiring due to an ankle injury and later suffering a serious illness that prevented him finding a job, Vale and Stoke held a benefit match on his behalf on 29 April 1907; the game finished 1–1. This would prove to be Burslem Port Vale's final ever match, as the club were dissolved, only to re-emerge later in the year when Cobridge Church renamed themselves Port Vale F.C.

== Career statistics ==
Appearances and goals by club, season and competition
Club	Season	League			FA Cup		Total	
Club	Season	Division	Apps	Goals	Apps	Goals	Apps	Goals
Burslem Port Vale	1902–03	Second Division	16	1	2	0	18	1
Stoke	1902–03	First Division	1	0	0	0	1	0
Stoke	1903–04	First Division	17	3	0	0	17	3
Stoke	1904–05	First Division	14	3	1	0	15	3
Stoke	1905–06	First Division	11	5	0	0	11	5
Stoke	Total		43	11	1	0	44	11
Career total			59	12	3	0	62	12
