= 1903–04 Stoke F.C. season =

Stoke
1903–04 season
- Chairman: Mr W Cowlishaw
- Manager: Horace Austerberry
- Stadium: Victoria Ground
- Football League First Division: 16th (27 Points)
- FA Cup: First Round
- Top goalscorer: League: Arthur Capes (11); All: Arthur Capes (11)
- Highest home attendance: 16,000 vs Bury (1 September 1903)
- Lowest home attendance: 4,000 vs West Brom (28 November 1903)
- Average home league attendance: 8,610
Home colours

The 1903–04 season was Stoke's 15th season in the Football League.

Any hopes Stoke fans had that last season's achievement of finishing sixth would signal a change in the club's fortunes were short-lived as the 1903–04 season was another poor one for Stoke. The team was in a hard relegation battle again and for the third time in four seasons Stoke required a final day escape and again they survived. Stoke drew the final match 1–1 with Derby County giving Stoke one more point than relegated Liverpool.

== Season review ==
=== League ===
Off the pitch, Stoke's financial problems continued after spending £2000 on a roof for the Butler Street Stand meaning that the season's budget was spent before a ball was kicked. Stoke did receive some support from the church who agreed to provide a 21-year lease on the Victoria Ground enabling Stoke to continue improving their ground. Hopes for similar improvements on the pitch however were short-lived as the 1903–04 season was another poor one for Stoke and their supporters. The team were in deep relegation trouble from Christmas onwards. Arthur Lockett such a key figure in the side last season signed for Aston Villa, and although one or two other players were drafted in few looked to have any real class. Stoke's best signing was that of Fred Rouse from Grimsby Town who would eventually be sold for a profit.

By January 1904 Mart Watkins had followed Lockett to Villa and at Easter time there was certainly an element of déjà vu about the position the club were in. West Bromwich Albion were sitting bottom of the table with 21 points from 30 games whilst Stoke were above them with the same number of points and matches played, while Liverpool had 22 points and Derby 23. Again it all came down to the final match of the season and yet again Stoke survived, a point against Derby was enough to keep Stoke up.

=== FA Cup ===
Stoke lost 3–2 at home to Aston Villa in the first round in front of 15,000 spectators with Stoke's goals coming from George Baddeley and Sam Higginson.

== Final league table ==
Pos	Team	Pld	W	D	L	GF	GA	GAv	Pts	Relegation
14	Derby County	34	9	10	15	58	60	0.967	28	
15	Blackburn Rovers	34	11	6	17	48	60	0.800	28	
16	Stoke	34	10	7	17	54	57	0.947	27	
17	Liverpool (R)	34	9	8	17	49	62	0.790	26	Relegation to the Second Division
18	West Bromwich Albion (R)	34	7	10	17	36	60	0.600	24	Relegation to the Second Division

Source: World Football
Rules for classification: 1) Points; 2) Goal average; 3) Goals scored
(R) Relegated

== Results ==
Stoke's score comes first

=== Legend ===
Win	Draw	Loss

=== Football League First Division ===
Match	Date	Opponent	Venue	Result	Attendance	Scorers
1	1 September 1903	Bury	H	4–1	16,000	Davies, Higginson, Watkins, Capes
2	5 September 1903	Manchester City	H	1–2	15,000	Whitehouse
3	12 September 1903	Notts County	A	0–1	12,000	
4	19 September 1903	Sheffield United	H	3–4	12,000	Whitehouse, Higginson, Bradley
5	26 September 1903	Newcastle United	A	0–1	15,000	
6	3 October 1903	Aston Villa	H	2–0	14,000	Watkins, Whitehouse
7	10 October 1903	Middlesbrough	A	0–2	15,000	
8	17 October 1903	Liverpool	H	5–2	10,000	Whitehouse, Capes, Holford, Holdcroft (2)
9	24 October 1903	Bury	A	2–2	5,000	Holford, Coxon
10	31 October 1903	Blackburn Rovers	H	6–2	10,000	Holford, Coxon, Watkins, Whitehouse, Capes, Eastham (o.g.)
11	14 November 1903	The Wednesday	H	3–1	12,000	Coxon, Watkins, Capes
12	21 November 1903	Sunderland	A	0–3	10,000	
13	25 November 1903	Nottingham Forest	A	2–4	1,500	Baddeley, Capes
14	28 November 1903	West Bromwich Albion	H	5–0	4,000	Watkins, Whitehouse, Davies (2), Higginson
15	5 December 1903	Small Heath	A	0–1	5,000	
16	12 December 1903	Everton	H	2–3	7,000	Watkins, Coxon
17	19 December 1903	Wolverhampton Wanderers	H	5–1	6,000	Watkins (2), Capes (3)
18	25 December 1903	Blackburn Rovers	A	0–2	25,000	
19	26 December 1903	Derby County	A	0–5	18,000	
20	28 December 1903	Middlesbrough	H	0–0	10,000	
21	2 January 1904	Manchester City	A	2–2	16,000	Capes, Whitehouse
22	9 January 1904	Notts County	H	0–2	8,000	
23	16 January 1904	Sheffield United	A	1–1	12,000	Gallimore
24	23 January 1904	Newcastle United	H	2–3	6,000	Capes, Holford
25	30 January 1904	Aston Villa	A	1–3	10,000	Capes
26	13 February 1904	Liverpool	A	0–0	13,000	
27	5 March 1904	Nottingham Forest	H	2–3	7,000	Leonard (2)
28	12 March 1904	The Wednesday	A	0–1	15,000	
29	19 March 1904	Sunderland	H	3–1	10,000	Leonard, Bradley, Haworth
30	26 March 1904	West Bromwich Albion	A	0–3	8,107	
31	2 April 1904	Small Heath	H	1–0	5,000	Coxon
32	4 April 1904	Wolverhampton Wanderers	A	0–0	6,000	
33	9 April 1904	Everton	A	1–0	12,000	Whitehouse
34	23 April 1904	Derby County	H	1–1	5,000	Whitehouse

=== FA Cup ===
Round	Date	Opponent	Venue	Result	Attendance	Scorers
R1	6 February 1904	Aston Villa	H	2–3	15,000	Higginson, Baddeley

== Squad statistics ==
Pos.	Name	League		FA Cup		Total	
Pos.	Name	Apps	Goals	Apps	Goals	Apps	Goals
GK	(England) Jack Benton	1	0	0	0	1	0
GK	(England) Arthur Box	0	0	0	0	0	0
GK	(Wales) Leigh Richmond Roose	32	0	1	0	33	0
GK	(Wales) Horace Viner	1	0	0	0	1	0
FB	(England) Harry Benson	13	0	0	0	13	0
FB	(England) Charlie Burgess	22	0	0	0	22	0
FB	(England) Arthur Hartshorne	26	0	1	0	27	0
FB	(Wales) Sam Meredith	7	0	1	0	8	0
HB	(England) George Baddeley	34	1	1	1	35	2
HB	(England) James Bradley	29	2	1	0	30	2
HB	(England) Tom Holford	34	3	1	0	35	3
HB	(England) Albert Sturgess	3	0	0	0	3	0
FW	(England) Arthur Capes	28	11	1	0	29	11
FW	(England) Tom Coxon	21	5	1	0	22	5
FW	(Wales) Lloyd Davies	7	3	0	0	7	3
FW	(England) Ross Fielding	5	0	1	0	6	0
FW	(England) George Gallimore	3	1	0	0	3	1
FW	(England) Jack Haworth	4	1	0	0	4	1
FW	(England) Sam Higginson	20	3	1	1	21	4
FW	(England) Charlie Hinks	1	0	0	0	1	0
FW	(England) Ted Holdcroft	17	3	0	0	17	3
FW	(England) Arthur Leonard	10	3	0	0	10	3
FW	(England) John Murphy	0	0	0	0	0	0
FW	(England) Albert Pitt	4	0	0	0	4	0
FW	(England) Fred Rouse	1	0	0	0	1	0
FW	(England) Alf Smith	1	0	0	0	1	0
FW	(Wales) Mart Watkins	19	8	0	0	19	8
FW	(England) Frank Whitehouse	31	9	1	0	32	9
–	Own goals	–	1	–	0	–	1
