= Frank Whitehouse =

English footballer

Personal information
- Full name: Frank Whitehouse
- Date of birth: June 1876
- Place of birth: Newcastle-under-Lyme, England
- Date of death: before 1960
- Position: Inside right

Youth career
- Bucknall

Senior career*
Years	Team	Apps	(Gls)
1899–1900	Burslem Port Vale	19	(1)
1900–1904	Stoke	88	(23)
1905	Glossop	20	(4)
Total		127	(28)
- * Club domestic league appearances and goals

Frank Whitehouse (June 1876 – before 1960) was an English footballer who played in the Football League for Burslem Port Vale, Glossop and Stoke.

== Career ==
Whitehouse played for Bucknall before joining Burslem Port Vale in June 1899. He bagged a brace on his (known) debut, playing outside-right in a 5–0 win over West Bromwich Albion at the Athletic Ground on 11 December 1899, in a first round Birmingham Senior Cup match. He played 19 Second Division matches for Vale, scoring once in a 2–1 defeat to Small Heath at Muntz Street.

He signed for Stoke in May 1900. He spent his first two seasons at the Victoria Ground in the reserves before becoming a regular in the 1902–03 season, where he scored nine goals. He scored the same number in the 1903–04 campaign, and hit a hat-trick in a 3–2 Boxing day win over Bolton Wanderers at Burnden Park. However, he lost his place in the side to Ross Fielding midway through the 1904–05 season. He left the Victoria Ground in the summer of 1905 and joined Second Division Glossop, where he played 20 times, scoring four goals.

== Career statistics ==
Appearances and goals by club, season and competition
Club	Season	League			FA Cup		Total	
Club	Season	Division	Apps	Goals	Apps	Goals	Apps	Goals
Burslem Port Vale	1899–1900	Second Division	19	1	0	0	19	1
Stoke	1900–01	First Division	6	1	0	0	6	1
Stoke	1901–02	First Division	6	3	0	0	6	3
Stoke	1902–03	First Division	29	8	4	1	33	9
Stoke	1903–04	First Division	31	9	1	0	32	9
Stoke	1904–05	First Division	16	2	2	0	18	2
Stoke	Total		88	23	7	1	95	24
Glossop	1905–06	Second Division	20	4	0	0	20	4
Career total			127	28	7	1	134	29
