= Mart Watkins =

Welsh footballer

Personal information
- Full name: Walter Martin Watkins
- Date of birth: 21 March 1880
- Place of birth: Caersws, Wales
- Date of death: 14 May 1942 (aged 62)
- Place of death: Stoke-on-Trent, England
- Position: Centre forward

Senior career*
Years	Team	Apps	(Gls)
1894–1896	Caersws		
1896–1900	Oswestry Town		
1900–1903	Stoke	108	(44)
1903–1904	Aston Villa	6	(1)
1904–1905	Sunderland	15	(9)
1905–1906	Crystal Palace	15	(6)
1906–1907	Northampton Town	38	(11)
1907–1908	Stoke	17	(4)
1908–1909	Crewe Alexandra		
1909–1910	Stafford Rangers		
1910–1911	Tunstall Park		
Total		161	(64)

International career
1902–1908	Wales	10	(4)
- * Club domestic league appearances and goals

Walter Martin Watkins (21 March 1880 – 14 May 1942) was a Welsh footballer who played in the Football League for Aston Villa, Stoke and Sunderland.

== Club career ==
Watkins was born in Caersws and was one of six sons of a Welsh farmer from Llanwnnog in Montgomeryshire. Along with his elder brother Ernie, Mart played for his local club, Oswestry Town where he was spotted by Football League side Stoke. He signed in August 1900 and with the "Potters" awful start to the 1900–01 season – one point from the first seven games – ensured a rapid entrance to first team football. Tall and slim with a neat moustache, Watkins was described as a 'smart player', possessing a whiplash shot who pass to his winger before dashing back into the penalty area to launch himself at the ensuing cross.

Watkins helped Stoke avoid relegation in 1900–01, scoring the winning goal in the team's last three matches. In 1901–02 he finished top scorer with 16 and repeated the feat with 13 in 1902–03 which earned him some Welsh caps. In January 1904 Manchester City offered Stoke £450 for Watkins' services. The deal collapsed, but with Stoke desperate for funds following the construction of a new stand Aston Villa manager George Ramsey signed Watkins for a 'high price' joining up with former Stoke winger Arthur Lockett.

His career at Villa Park didn't last long after playing just six matches scoring once, ironically against Stoke, he signed for Sunderland in October 1904. Watkins made his debut for Sunderland on 22 October 1904 in a 3–0 defeat against Sheffield Wednesday at Roker Park where he scored two goals. Over his career at the club, he made 15 league appearances scoring nine goals.

Watkins then joined the newly formed Crystal Palace in the Southern Football League Division Two, helping them win the league and gain promotion to the First Division, scoring six goals in 15 league appearances and in the FA Cup netting six from six appearances. Watkins then moved to Northampton Town then in 1907 he rejoined Stoke who at the time were on the brink of bankruptcy. He scored five goals in 20 matches as a Stoke endured a terrible 1907–08 which saw the supporters abandon the team and the club entered liquidation, resigning from the Football League in the process. Watkins then played for Crewe Alexandra followed by moves to Stafford Rangers and Tunstall Park. Watkins did return to Stoke in 1911 but failed to win a contract and decided to retire from football.

== International career ==
Watkins played ten times for the Wales national team scoring four goals. In July 2021 Watkins' Welsh cap from 1905 was donated to the Football Museum for Wales by the Watkins family who had emigrated to Australia.

== Career statistics ==
=== Club ===
Club	Season	League			FA Cup		Total	
Club	Season	Division	Apps	Goals	Apps	Goals	Apps	Goals
Stoke	1900–01	First Division	28	9	3	1	31	10
Stoke	1901–02	First Division	32	15	4	1	36	16
Stoke	1902–03	First Division	29	12	4	1	33	13
Stoke	1903–04	First Division	19	8	0	0	19	8
Stoke	Total		108	44	11	3	119	47
Aston Villa	1903–04	First Division	5	1	0	0	5	1
Aston Villa	1904–05	First Division	1	0	0	0	1	0
Aston Villa	Total		6	1	0	0	6	1
Sunderland	1904–05	First Division	15	9	1	0	16	9
Stoke	1907–08	Second Division	17	4	3	1	20	5
Career Total			146	58	15	4	161	62

=== International ===
National team	Year	Apps	Goals
Wales	1902	1	0
Wales	1903	2	1
Wales	1904	3	1
Wales	1905	3	2
Wales	1908	1	0
Total		10	4
