= Bill Capewell =

English footballer

Personal information
- Full name: William Capewell
- Date of birth: 1878
- Place of birth: Stoke-upon-Trent, England
- Position: Defender

Senior career*
Years	Team	Apps	(Gls)
1895	Stoke	1	(0)
1896–1898	Reading		
1899–1902	Stoke	57	(0)
- * Club domestic league appearances and goals

William Capewell (1878 – unknown) was an English footballer who played in the Football League for Stoke and in the Southern League for Reading.

== Career ==
Capewell began playing football for his hometown club, Stoke, in the 1895–96 season. He left at the end of the season for Reading before returning to Stoke in 1899. He was a regular in the side in 1900–01 and, after making 63 total appearances, left in May 1902.

== Career statistics ==
Appearances and goals by club, season and competition
Club	Season	League			FA Cup		Total	
Club	Season	Division	Apps	Goals	Apps	Goals	Apps	Goals
Stoke	1895–96	First Division	1	0	1	0	2	0
Stoke	1899–1900	First Division	11	0	1	0	12	0
Stoke	1900–01	First Division	33	0	3	0	36	0
Stoke	1901–02	First Division	12	0	0	0	12	0
Stoke	1902–03	First Division	1	0	0	0	1	0
Career total			58	0	5	0	63	0
