= 1900–01 Stoke F.C. season =

Stoke
1900–01 season
- Chairman: Mr W Cowlishaw
- Manager: Horace Austerberry
- Stadium: Victoria Ground
- Football League First Division: 16th (27 Points)
- FA Cup: First Round
- Top goalscorer: League: William Maxwell (16); All: William Maxwell (16)
- Highest home attendance: 12,000 vs Aston Villa (29 December 1900)
- Lowest home attendance: 3,000 vs Derby County (24 November 1900)
- Average home league attendance: 7,650
Home colours

The 1900–01 season was Stoke's 12th season of in the Football League.

It was a hard season for Stoke as they were almost relegated to the Second Division but survived after winning their final match of the season 4–2 away at Notts County.

== Season review ==
=== League ===
By now Stoke had lost the valuable services of Tom Robertson, Jack Kennedy and Joe Turner while dedicated full-back Jack Eccles made only two appearances and later became club trainer as the team slowly broke up. Only two points were collected from their first eight games and a disjointed Stoke side slipped to the bottom of the table. The situation improved slightly with the arrival of Welsh forward Mart Watkins from Oswestry Town but Stoke were involved in a relegation dog-fight until the final day of the season.

On Good Friday (5 April 1901) Stoke went to Bury and were denied two blatant penalties and lost 3–2. This defeat left Stoke in 17th position, three points and one place above West Bromwich Albion who had three games in hand, while Preston and Wolves were just above them. Stoke's remaining two games were both away - to Wolves and Notts County. Preston ended their season with a home clash with West Brom who were struggling to find any form and looked doomed. Remarkably, Stoke upped their game and won both matches while Preston lost and went down with Albion leaving Stoke safe in 16th place. It had been a tense and difficult season and the club's finances were now in a very precarious state, both manager and chairman recognized this and the club would now look at the local leagues for players.

Unfortunately ace marksman William Maxwell bid farewell to Stoke at the end of the season joining Third Lanark for £250 after scoring 85 goals in 173 games for the "Potters" and he would be sorely missed.

=== FA Cup ===
The 1900–01 season saw Stoke having to play in the Intermediate Round which was a consequence of their secretary failing to get their entry to the competition to the FA by the required time. Stoke beat Second Division Glossop 1–0. In the first round Stoke lost 2–1 in a replay to Small Heath after a 1–1 draw at the Victoria Ground.

== Final league table ==
Pos	Team	Pld	W	D	L	GF	GA	GAv	Pts	Relegation
14	Sheffield United	34	12	7	15	35	52	0.673	31	
15	Aston Villa	34	10	10	14	45	51	0.882	30	
16	Stoke	34	11	5	18	46	57	0.807	27	
17	Preston North End (R)	34	9	7	18	49	75	0.653	25	Relegation to the Second Division
18	West Bromwich Albion (R)	34	7	8	19	35	62	0.565	22	Relegation to the Second Division

Source: World Football
Rules for classification: 1) Points; 2) Goal average; 3) Goals scored
(R) Relegated

== Results ==
Stoke's score comes first

=== Legend ===
Win	Draw	Loss

=== Football League First Division ===
Match	Date	Opponent	Venue	Result	Attendance	Scorers
1	1 September 1900	Aston Villa	A	0–2	15,000	
2	8 September 1900	Liverpool	H	1–2	12,000	Maxwell
3	10 September 1900	Notts County	H	1–1	5,000	Jones
4	15 September 1900	Newcastle United	A	1–2	20,000	Wood
5	22 September 1900	Sheffield United	H	0–1	7,000	
6	29 September 1900	Manchester City	A	0–2	15,000	
7	6 October 1900	Bury	H	1–2	4,000	Maxwell
8	13 October 1900	Nottingham Forest	A	1–1	9,000	Johnson
9	20 October 1900	Blackburn Rovers	H	2–0	10,000	Jones, Maxwell
10	27 October 1900	The Wednesday	H	2–1	6,000	Jones (2)
11	3 November 1900	West Bromwich Albion	A	2–2	12,052	Maxwell, Watkins
12	10 November 1900	Everton	H	0–2	8,000	
13	12 November 1900	Bolton Wanderers	H	2–1	3,000	Watkins, Wood
14	17 November 1900	Sunderland	A	1–6	5,000	Johnson
15	24 November 1900	Derby County	H	0–1	3,000	
16	1 December 1900	Bolton Wanderers	A	0–1	5,000	
17	22 December 1900	Wolverhampton Wanderers	H	3–0	5,000	Maxwell (3)
18	25 December 1900	Preston North End	A	2–4	6,000	Maxwell, Higginson
19	26 December 1900	Preston North End	H	5–0	7,500	Maxwell (3), Higginson, Watkins
20	29 December 1900	Aston Villa	H	0–0	12,000	
21	1 January 1901	Liverpool	A	1–3	10,000	Higginson
22	12 January 1901	Newcastle United	H	2–0	6,000	Benbow (2)
23	19 January 1901	Sheffield United	A	4–0	4,000	Maxwell (2), Johnson, Watkins
24	26 January 1901	Manchester City	H	2–1	3,000	Johnson, Watkins
25	16 February 1901	Nottingham Forest	H	0–3	7,000	
26	23 February 1901	Blackburn Rovers	A	2–3	5,000	Maxwell, Watkins
27	2 March 1901	The Wednesday	A	0–4	3,000	
28	9 March 1901	West Bromwich Albion	H	2–0	5,000	Maxwell, Leech
29	16 March 1901	Everton	A	0–3	10,000	
30	23 March 1901	Sunderland	H	0–0	9,000	
31	30 March 1901	Derby County	A	1–4	5,000	Leech
32	5 April 1901	Bury	A	2–3	2,000	Watkins, Whitehouse
33	9 April 1901	Wolverhampton Wanderers	A	2–0	4,000	Watkins, Higginson
34	13 April 1901	Notts County	A	4–2	6,000	Watkins, Higginson, Maxwell, Johnson

=== FA Cup ===
Round	Date	Opponent	Venue	Result	Attendance	Scorers
IR	5 January 1901	Glossop	H	1–0	5,000	Benbow
R1	9 February 1901	Small Heath	H	1–1	12,000	Watkins
R1 Replay	13 February 1901	Small Heath	A	1–2 (aet)	10,000	Benbow

== Squad statistics ==
Pos.	Name	League		FA Cup		Total	
Pos.	Name	Apps	Goals	Apps	Goals	Apps	Goals
GK	(England) Arthur Cartlidge	7	0	0	0	7	0
GK	(England) Tom Wilkes	27	0	3	0	30	0
FB	(England) Bill Capewell	33	0	3	0	36	0
FB	(England) Peter Durber	33	0	2	0	35	0
FB	(England) Jack Eccles	2	0	1	0	3	0
HB	(England) John Bowman	2	0	0	0	2	0
HB	(England) James Bradley	34	0	3	0	37	0
HB	(England) Tom Holford	6	0	1	0	7	0
HB	(England) Billy Leech	33	2	2	0	35	2
HB	(England) Edward Parsons	5	0	1	0	6	0
HB	(England) Alf Wood	29	2	2	0	31	2
FW	(England) Len Benbow	21	2	3	2	24	4
FW	(England) George Harris	1	0	0	0	1	0
FW	(England) Sam Higginson	18	5	2	0	20	5
FW	(England) Freddie Johnson	34	5	3	0	37	5
FW	(England) Jimmy Jones	12	4	1	0	13	4
FW	(England) Arthur Lockett	16	0	0	0	16	0
FW	(Scotland) William Maxwell	27	16	3	0	30	16
FW	(England) Tom Simpson	0	0	0	0	0	0
FW	(Wales) Mart Watkins	28	9	3	1	31	10
FW	(England) Frank Whitehouse	6	1	0	0	6	1
