= Len Hales =

English footballer

Personal information
- Full name: Leonard Hales
- Date of birth: 1872
- Place of birth: Crewe, England
- Date of death: 1914 (aged 42)
- Position: Forward

Senior career*
Years	Team	Apps	(Gls)
1897	Crewe Alexandra		
1898–1899	Stoke	1	(0)
1899–1901	Crewe Alexandra		
1901–1902	Stoke	15	(2)
- * Club domestic league appearances and goals

Leonard Hales (1872–1914) was an English footballer who played in the Football League for Stoke.

== Career ==
Hales began his career with his home town club Crewe Alexandra before joining Stoke in 1898. He made just one appearance before returning to Crewe. He spent two years at the Alex before trying his luck again with Stoke and he had a far more successful time scoring 4 goals in 19 matches.

== Career statistics ==
Appearances and goals by club, season and competition
Club	Season	League			FA Cup		Total	
Club	Season	Division	Apps	Goals	Apps	Goals	Apps	Goals
Stoke	1898–99	First Division	1	0	0	0	1	0
Stoke	1901–02	First Division	15	2	4	2	19	4
Career Total			16	2	4	2	20	4
