= Bertram Wallace =

English footballer

Personal information
- Full name: Bertram Wallace
- Date of birth: 23 October 1880
- Place of birth: Stoke-upon-Trent, England
- Date of death: 1948 (aged 67–68)
- Position: Outside left

Senior career*
| Years | Team | Apps | (Gls) |
| 1900 | Stoke St Jude's | | |
| 1901–1902 | Stoke | 1 | (0) |
| 1902 | Stoke Town | | |
- * Club domestic league appearances and goals

Bertram Wallace (23 October 1880 – 1948) was an English footballer who played in the Football League for Stoke.

== Career ==
Wallace was born in Stoke-upon-Trent, Staffordshire, and played local football for Stoke St Jude's before joining Football League club Stoke. He made his only League appearance against Sheffield Wednesday playing at outside-left in the First Division during the 1901–02 season. After Wallace left Stoke, he returned to local football with Stoke Town.

== Career statistics ==
Appearances and goals by club, season and competition
| Club | Season | League | | | FA Cup | | Total | |
| Club | Season | Division | Apps | Goals | Apps | Goals | Apps | Goals |
|---|---|---|---|---|---|---|---|---|
| Stoke | 1901–02 | First Division | 1 | 0 | 0 | 0 | 1 | 0 |
| Career total | | | 1 | 0 | 0 | 0 | 1 | 0 |
