= Herbert Salt =

English footballer

Personal information
- Full name: Herbert Arthur Salt
- Date of birth: 1880
- Place of birth: Stoke-upon-Trent, England
- Date of death: 1967 (aged 87)
- Position: Goalkeeper

Senior career*
Years	Team	Apps	(Gls)
1901	Newcastle St Peter's		
1902–1903	Stoke	1	(0)
1903	Stafford Rangers		
- * Club domestic league appearances and goals

Herbert Arthur Salt (1880–1967) was an English footballer who played in the Football League for Stoke.

== Career ==
Salt was born in Stoke-upon-Trent and played for Newcastle St Peter's before joining Stoke in 1902. He made one appearance for Stoke which came in a 3–0 win over West Bromwich Albion in April 1903. He later played for Stafford Rangers.

== Career statistics ==
Appearances and goals by club, season and competition
Club	Season	League			FA Cup		Total	
Club	Season	Division	Apps	Goals	Apps	Goals	Apps	Goals
Stoke	1902–03	First Division	1	0	0	0	1	0
Career total			1	0	0	0	1	0
