= 1901–02 Stoke F.C. season =

Stoke
1901–02 season
- Chairman: Mr W Cowlishaw
- Manager: Horace Austerberry
- Stadium: Victoria Ground
- Football League First Division: 16th (31 Points)
- FA Cup: Third Round
- Top goalscorer: League: Mart Watkins (15); All: Mart Watkins (16)
- Highest home attendance: 13,000 vs Bury (2 September 1901)
- Lowest home attendance: 4,000 vs Newcastle United (11 January 1902)
- Average home league attendance: 7,280
Home colours

The 1901–02 season was Stoke's 13th season in the Football League.

Stoke failed to improve from last season's narrow escape and again required a final day survival, Stoke stayed up after a 2–2 draw with Manchester City one point more than Small Heath who could only draw 0–0 with Notts County and were relegated.

== Season review ==
=== League ===
Stoke now without William Maxwell struggled again in 1901–02. With winger Freddie Johnson now skippering the side, Stoke again took 16th position in the First Division avoiding relegation by a single point thanks mainly to a four match unbeaten run at the end of the season. The relegation battle came to a crescendo in April with literally 14 of the 18 teams in the division in danger of the drop, with 3rd placed Newcastle United only avoiding relegation by seven points.

At the start of April the bottom of the table was tight with Stoke having one of the poorest goal-averages, and away trips to Notts County and Manchester City were favourites to go down. But again, Stoke escaped after switching 5 ft 5 inch half-back Tom Holford to centre forward for the last four games which ended in a 1–1 draw at Notts County, home wins 4–0 and 2–0 over Bolton and Grimsby respectively and a last gasp 2–2 draw with Manchester City where Holford scored his third goal in succession. Stoke could have gone down right at the death if Small Heath had beaten Notts County in their last match but they drew 0–0 and both the Birmingham club and Manchester City were relegated. One of Stoke's most bizarre events in their history occurred in January 1902 when the team fell ill with food poisoning just before a league match away at Liverpool. The players had eaten fish at the Adelphi Hotel and were violently sick in the dressing room at Anfield. Soon into the match goalkeeper Leigh Richmond Roose had to leave the pitch and Stoke went on to lose 7–0.

=== FA Cup ===
Stoke fared better in the FA Cup this season beating Aston Villa and Bristol Rovers before losing to Nottingham Forest in the third round.

== Final league table ==
Pos	Team	Pld	W	D	L	GF	GA	GAv	Pts	Relegation
14	Wolverhampton Wanderers	34	13	6	15	46	57	0.807	32	
15	Grimsby Town	34	13	6	15	44	60	0.733	32	
16	Stoke	34	11	9	14	45	55	0.818	31	
17	Small Heath (R)	34	11	8	15	47	45	1.044	30	Relegation to the Second Division
18	Manchester City (R)	34	11	6	17	42	58	0.724	28	Relegation to the Second Division

Source: World Football
Rules for classification: 1) Points; 2) Goal average; 3) Goals scored
(R) Relegated

== Results ==
Stoke's score comes first

=== Legend ===
Win	Draw	Loss

=== Football League First Division ===
Match	Date	Opponent	Venue	Result	Attendance	Scorers
1	2 September 1901	Bury	H	1–2	13,000	Lockett
2	7 September 1901	Liverpool	H	1–0	12,000	Higginson
3	14 September 1901	Newcastle United	A	1–5	20,000	Lockett
4	21 September 1901	Aston Villa	H	1–0	10,000	Watkins
5	28 September 1901	Sheffield United	A	1–1	12,000	Higginson
6	5 October 1901	Nottingham Forest	H	1–1	8,000	Johnson
7	12 October 1901	Bury	A	2–4	8,000	Watkins (2)
8	19 October 1901	Blackburn Rovers	H	2–2	10,000	Watkins, Lockett
9	26 October 1901	Grimsby Town	A	2–1	6,000	Watkins, Whitehouse
10	2 November 1901	Everton	A	0–1	16,000	
11	9 November 1901	Sunderland	H	3–0	10,000	Watkins (2), Doig (o.g.)
12	11 November 1901	Wolverhampton Wanderers	H	3–0	8,000	Watkins, Johnson, Hales
13	23 November 1901	Derby County	H	1–1	8,000	Harris
14	30 November 1901	The Wednesday	A	1–3	7,500	Johnson
15	7 December 1901	Notts County	H	3–0	7,000	Watkins, Hales, Lockett
16	14 December 1901	Bolton Wanderers	A	1–2	6,000	Watkins
17	26 December 1901	Sheffield United	H	3–2	12,000	Watkins (2), MacDonald
18	28 December 1901	Wolverhampton Wanderers	A	1–4	7,000	Whitehouse
19	4 January 1902	Liverpool	A	0–7	7,000	
20	11 January 1902	Newcastle United	H	0–0	4,000	
21	13 January 1902	Manchester City	H	3–0	5,000	Higginson, Watkins, Whitehouse
22	18 January 1902	Aston Villa	A	0–0	25,000	
23	1 February 1902	Nottingham Forest	A	0–2	6,000	
24	15 February 1902	Blackburn Rovers	A	1–6	7,000	Watkins
25	17 February 1902	Small Heath	A	1–1	5,000	MacDonald
26	1 March 1902	Everton	H	1–2	10,000	MacDonald
27	8 March 1902	Sunderland	A	0–2	8,000	
28	15 March 1902	Small Heath	H	1–0	6,000	Lockett
29	22 March 1902	Derby County	A	0–1	8,000	
30	29 March 1902	The Wednesday	H	1–2	7,000	Higginson
31	5 April 1902	Notts County	A	1–1	5,000	Harris
32	12 April 1902	Bolton Wanderers	H	4–0	5,000	Harris, Holford, Higginson (2)
33	14 April 1902	Grimsby Town	H	2–0	4,000	Watkins, Holford
34	19 April 1902	Manchester City	A	2–2	7,000	Holford, Hillman (o.g.)

=== FA Cup ===
Round	Date	Opponent	Venue	Result	Attendance	Scorers
R1	25 January 1902	Aston Villa	H	2–2	20,000	Watkins, Hales
R1 Replay	29 January 1902	Aston Villa	A	2–1 (aet)	22,000	Higginson, Hales
R2	8 February 1902	Bristol Rovers	A	1–0	15,000	Dunn (o.g.)
R3	22 February 1902	Nottingham Forest	A	0–2	29,000	

== Squad statistics ==
Pos.	Name	League		FA Cup		Total	
Pos.	Name	Apps	Goals	Apps	Goals	Apps	Goals
GK	(England) George Boote	1	0	0	0	1	0
GK	(England) George Lawton	1	0	0	0	1	0
GK	(Wales) Leigh Richmond Roose	24	0	4	0	28	0
GK	(England) Tom Wilkes	8	0	0	0	8	0
FB	(England) Harry Benson	1	0	0	0	1	0
FB	(England) Charlie Burgess	3	0	1	0	4	0
FB	(England) Bill Capewell	12	0	0	0	12	0
FB	(Scotland) Andy Clark	34	0	3	0	37	0
FB	(Wales) Sam Meredith	27	0	4	0	31	0
HB	(England) Thomas Shufflebotham	0	0	0	0	0	0
HB	(England) Samuel Ashworth	25	0	4	0	29	0
HB	(England) George Baddeley	7	0	0	0	7	0
HB	(England) James Bradley	23	0	2	0	25	0
HB	(England) Tom Holford	29	3	4	0	33	3
HB	(England) Vic Horrocks	0	0	0	0	0	0
HB	(England) Billy Leech	13	0	2	0	15	0
FW	(England) Ross Fielding	2	0	0	0	2	0
FW	(England) Len Hales	15	2	4	2	19	4
FW	(England) George Harris	15	3	0	0	15	3
FW	(England) Sam Higginson	30	6	4	1	34	7
FW	(England) Freddie Johnson	29	3	4	0	33	3
FW	(England) Arthur Lockett	27	5	4	0	31	5
FW	(Scotland) Billy MacDonald	9	3	0	0	9	3
FW	(England) Bertram Wallace	1	0	0	0	1	0
FW	(Wales) Mart Watkins	32	15	4	1	36	16
FW	(England) Frank Whitehouse	6	3	0	0	6	3
–	Own goals	–	2	–	1	–	3
