= Sam Meredith =

Welsh footballer

Personal information
- Full name: Samuel Meredith
- Date of birth: 5 September 1872
- Place of birth: Trefonen, Shropshire
- Date of death: 25 December 1921 (aged 49)
- Place of death: Gorton, England
- Position: Full back

Senior career*
| Years | Team | Apps | (Gls) |
| 1894–1901 | Chirk AAA | | |
| 1901–1904 | Stoke | 45 | (0) |
| 1905 | Leyton | | |

International career
| 1901–1907 | Wales | 8 | (0) |
- * Club domestic league appearances and goals

Samuel Meredith (5 September 1872 – 25 December 1921) was a Welsh footballer, who played in the English Football League for Stoke where he made fifty appearances as well as eight appearances for the Wales national team. His brother, Billy, was also a Welsh international footballer.

== Career ==
Meredith was born Trefonen and played for Chirk AAA before joining Stoke in 1901. He was a regular in his first season at the Victoria Ground making 31 appearances in 1901–02 but then was used as back-up by manager Horace Austerberry. He left in 1904 for Leyton having played 50 matches for Stoke.

== Career statistics ==
=== Club ===
| Club | Season | League | | | FA Cup | | Total | |
| Club | Season | Division | Apps | Goals | Apps | Goals | Apps | Goals |
|---|---|---|---|---|---|---|---|---|
| Stoke | 1901–02 | First Division | 27 | 0 | 4 | 0 | 31 | 0 |
| Stoke | 1902–03 | First Division | 6 | 0 | 0 | 0 | 6 | 0 |
| Stoke | 1903–04 | First Division | 7 | 0 | 1 | 0 | 8 | 0 |
| Stoke | 1904–05 | First Division | 5 | 0 | 0 | 0 | 5 | 0 |
| Career Total | | | 45 | 0 | 5 | 0 | 50 | 0 |

=== International ===
| National team | Year | Apps | Goals |
|---|---|---|---|
| Wales | 1900 | 1 | 0 |
| Wales | 1901 | 3 | 0 |
| Wales | 1902 | 1 | 0 |
| Wales | 1903 | 1 | 0 |
| Wales | 1904 | 1 | 0 |
| Wales | 1907 | 1 | 0 |
| Total | | 8 | 0 |
