= George Baddeley =

English footballer

Personal information
- Full name: George Baddeley
- Date of birth: 8 May 1874
- Place of birth: Stoke-upon-Trent, England
- Date of death: July 1952 (aged 78)
- Place of death: West Bromwich, England
- Position: Half back

Senior career*
Years	Team	Apps	(Gls)
1901–1908	Stoke	208	(14)
1908–1914	West Bromwich Albion	145	(2)
Total		353	(16)
- * Club domestic league appearances and goals

George Baddeley (8 May 1874 – July 1952) was an English footballer who played in the Football League for Stoke and West Bromwich Albion.

== Career ==
Born in Fegg Hayes, Stoke-upon-Trent, Baddeley attended Fegg Hayes Church of England School. After leaving school he played football for Ball Heath, Burslem Swifts, Pitshill and Biddulph He joined Stoke in May 1900 he made his debut in 1901–02. He was awarded the captaincy in his first full season of 1902–03, alongside Tom Holford and James Bradley, Baddeley completed a powerful midfield three which effectively kept Stoke in the First Division throughout the early 1900s. Although occasionally criticised for 'marring a clever display by trying to do much with the ball' Baddeley's consistency allowed him to play 99 consecutive for Stoke from February 1903. Despite home crowds averaging 8,000 in 1905–06, the directors brought poorly and Stoke imploded first being relegated and then being liquidated which saw them leave the Football League at the end of the 1907–08 season.

In July 1908 Baddeley along with centre forward Freddie Brown signed for West Bromwich Albion for £250 and made his debut away at Grimsby Town two months later. He won a Second Division championship medal with the club in 1910–11 and an FA Cup runners-up medal in 1912. Baddeley's last game for Albion was against Sheffield Wednesday on 18 April 1914, at the age of 39 years, 345 days. He remains, as of October 2008, the oldest player ever to appear for the club in a competitive fixture. He retired from football the following month after playing making 157 senior appearances for West Bromwich Albion. He subsequently became a publican and also worked in the upholstery trade. He died in West Bromwich in July 1952.

== Career statistics ==
Club	Season	League			FA Cup		Total	
Club	Season	Division	Apps	Goals	Apps	Goals	Apps	Goals
Stoke	1901–02	First Division	7	0	0	0	7	0
Stoke	1902–03	First Division	30	2	3	1	33	3
Stoke	1903–04	First Division	34	1	1	1	35	2
Stoke	1904–05	First Division	34	0	2	1	36	1
Stoke	1905–06	First Division	34	4	2	0	36	4
Stoke	1906–07	First Division	32	3	3	1	35	4
Stoke	1907–08	Second Division	37	4	6	1	43	5
Stoke	Total		208	14	17	5	225	19
West Bromwich Albion	1908–09	Second Division	35	1	2	0	37	1
West Bromwich Albion	1909–10	Second Division	33	0	0	0	33	0
West Bromwich Albion	1910–11	Second Division	33	1	2	0	35	1
West Bromwich Albion	1911–12	First Division	28	0	8	0	36	0
West Bromwich Albion	1912–13	First Division	10	0	0	0	10	0
West Bromwich Albion	1913–14	First Division	6	0	0	0	6	0
West Bromwich Albion	Total		145	2	12	0	157	2
Career Total			353	16	29	5	382	21

== Honours ==
West Bromwich Albion

- Football League Second Division champions: 1910–11
- FA Cup runner-up: 1911–12
