= Leigh Richmond Roose =

Welsh footballer (1877–1916)

- Portrait of L R Roose on a Ogden's cigarette card.

Personal information
- Full name: Leigh Richmond Roose
- Date of birth: 27 November 1877
- Place of birth: Holt, Wales
- Date of death: 7 October 1916 (aged 38)
- Place of death: Somme, France
- Height: 6 ft 1 in (1.85 m)
- Position: Goalkeeper

Youth career
- UCW Aberystwyth

Senior career*
Years	Team	Apps	(Gls)
1895–1900	Aberystwyth Town	85	(0)
1900	Porth	0	(0)
1900	Druids	0	(0)
1900–1901	London Welsh	0	(0)
1901–1904	Stoke	81	(0)
1904–1905	Everton	18	(0)
1905–1907	Stoke	66	(0)
1908–1910	Sunderland	92	(0)
1910	Celtic	0	(0)
1910	Port Vale	0	(0)
1910–1911	Huddersfield Town	5	(0)
1911	Aston Villa	10	(0)
1911–1912	Woolwich Arsenal	13	(0)
	Aberystwyth Town		(0)
	Llandudno Town		(0)
Total		370	(0)

International career
1900–1911	Wales	24	(0)
1911	Wales Amateur	1	(0)
- * Club domestic league appearances and goals

Leigh Richmond "Dick" Roose, MM, (27 November 1877 – 7 October 1916) was a Welsh international footballer who kept goal for several professional clubs in the Football League between 1901 and 1912. A celebrated amateur at a time when the game was played largely by professionals, Roose was renowned as one of the best players in his position in the Edwardian period. He was also well known as a footballing eccentric, and many stories about him are still told today. He made 24 appearances for Wales between 1900 and 1911.

== Early life ==
Roose was born in Holt, near Wrexham in Wales, at a time when association football was principally confined to the north of the country. Roose was raised by his father, a Presbyterian minister named Richmond Leigh Roose, following the death of his mother from cancer when he was two years old. He was educated at Holt Academy – where in the course of one violent football match, Roose's brother Edward kicked H. G. Wells, then a teacher at the school, so hard in the back that he ruptured the future novelist's kidney and left him incapacitated for several weeks. On leaving school in 1895, he went on to study at Aberystwyth University.

After graduating from Aberystwyth, Roose studied medicine briefly at King's College London. Although accounts of Roose often refer to him as a doctor of bacteriology, he never qualified as a doctor.

== Club career ==
Standing 6 ft 1 in (1.85 m) and weighing over 13 stone (180 lb; 83 kg), Roose was well qualified to play in goal, a specialised position that was, in the Edwardian era, particularly physically challenging.

He began his footballing career in 1895 with Aberystwyth Town, playing for the club on 85 occasions. His debut came in a 6–0 win over the Shropshire team Whitchurch in October 1895, and he was carried from the pitch shoulder-high following the team's 3–0 victory over Druids in the Welsh Cup final of 1900. It was during this phase of his career that Roose was seen playing by the eminent Welsh historian Thomas Richards, who would later refer to him as Yr Ercwlff synfawr hwn ("This wondrous Hercules").

In March 1900, Roose joined South Wales based Porth until the end of the season.

For the 1900-01 season, Roose joined Druids. He played in the 1901 Welsh Cup Final where Druids lost against Oswestry United.

Roose pictured in a Stoke team photograph c.1904. From Association Football and the Men Who Made It (1906).

Signed by Stoke, Roose made 147 league appearances for the Staffordshire club from 1901 to 1904 and 1905–1906 – the latter spell, consisting of only three games, being terminated by a broken wrist. Roose kept 40 clean sheets (that is, did not concede a goal) during his Stoke career, a remarkable record not least because his team flirted dangerously with relegation in 1901, 1902 and 1904.

Roose punctuated his two spells at Stoke with 24 appearances for Everton, whom he helped reach the semi-final of the FA Cup in 1905. He arrived partway through the 1904–05 season and replaced the Irish goalkeeper Billy Scott, who had conceded 17 goals in the first 12 games of the season. Roose kept 8 clean sheets for Everton, a record proportionately better even than that he had set at Stoke.

After leaving Everton, Roose went on to play in 91 league matches and seven cup games for Sunderland between 1907 and 1910, helping the club to finish second in the league on two occasions, and "almost single-handedly" saving the team from relegation on a third. When a second broken wrist terminated his Sunderland career, there was some call for Roose's services to be recognised with a testimonial match. Since the player's amateur status forbade this, an illuminated address was presented instead.

In the course of his career, Roose also turned out for Port Vale and Celtic (both 1910). He played one game for Celtic, a Scottish Cup semi-final in which Celtic lost 1–3 to Clyde on 12 March 1910. He made his mark on this game by running after the goalscorer of one of the Clyde goals and shaking his hand! Other clubs he represented on at least one occasion included Druids, Huddersfield Town (1910–1911), Aston Villa (August to December 1911) and Woolwich Arsenal (1911–1912).

Throughout his club career, Roose retained his amateur status but charged his clubs handsomely for his expenses.

== International career ==
Roose's international career began in 1900 when he played for Wales in a 2–0 defeat of Ireland. He won a total of 24 caps, turning out for his last international game against Scotland in March 1911. He was one of Wales's key players when the team won the British Home Championship for the first time in 1907. Since Wales did not play their first international match against an opponent from outside the Home Nations until 1933, all of Roose's games were played against England, Scotland or Ireland. He also appeared for Wales Amateurs in 1911.

== Playing style and philosophy of goalkeeping ==
Roose gets into position to make a save for Stoke, c.1904. From Association Football and the Men Who Made It (1906).

Roose has been described by the Dictionary of Welsh Biography as a man who "had been thoroughly grounded in the fundamentals of his art, and gave interpretation to them in the style and manner of a man of genius". This opinion was shared by the long-serving Secretary of the Football Association, Sir Frederick Wall, who thought that Roose – "such a sensation as a goalkeeper" – was "a clever man [who] had what is sometimes described as the eccentricity of genius. His daring was seen in the goal, where he was often taking risks and emerging triumphant."

More, perhaps, than any 'keeper of his time other than William Foulke, Roose possessed the size and strength to meet the robust strikers of the period on equal terms. His considerable physical presence has been compared to that of the modern Danish 'keeper Peter Schmeichel, and according to one biographer, the Welshman "enjoyed taunting experienced international forwards, some of whom felt the full force of his fist in goalmouth melees."

The Athletic Times described Roose as "dexterous though daring, valiant though volatile". Spectators, observed the DWB, "could only gaze in wonder at his prehensile grip, the immense power of his punch, and the prodigious length of his goal kicks; they could only guess at the uncanny intuition by which he divined the aims of his opponents, the swift agile mind that worked behind the small, narrow eyes." Geraint Jenkins, an Aberystwyth historian who wrote a brief biographical sketch of the goalkeeper in 2000, adds that Roose boasted "sharp eyesight, startling reflexes, competitive instinct and reckless bravery", and was altogether "an extraordinarily daunting opponent".

If contemporary accounts are reliable, Jenkins continues, "the save which Roose made while representing Aberystwyth against Builth in the Leominster Cup in 1897 was at least equal to that made by Gordon Banks against Pelé at Guadalajara in the 1970 FIFA World Cup."

Roose played in a daring style, often – at a time when other goalkeepers rarely strayed more than a few yards from their goals – rushing out of his penalty area to fill the position left by an errant full-back. In his first international, he sprinted from his area and shoulder-charged an opposing Irish winger on the far touchline, bundling him out of play and knocking him unconscious. He also took full advantage of the rules of the day, which allowed the goalkeeper to handle the ball anywhere in his own half. It has been said that the 1912 alteration to the Laws of the Game, forbidding the goalkeeper to handle outside his penalty area, was directly due to the performances of Roose, who enjoyed taking part in attacks.

Roose was a famous saver of penalties. Thomas Richards (1878–1962), the renowned Welsh authority on 17th-century Puritanism, gave an account of a save he had seen Roose execute for Aberystwyth against Glossop North End, a professional team from the Midland League, in an FA Cup match. "One of the full backs," Richards wrote in Gwr o Athrylith (Man of Genius), his profile of Roose,

"committed an unforgivable foul in the penalty box; the harsh blast of the referee's whistle, his finger pointing to one of the most calamitous places in the purgatory of this life; the penalty spot. The heavy odour of death hung over the fateful spot: did you not hear a crowd of thousands suddenly become dumb mutes, did you not see the players standing in a half circle as if they were at a graveside... Everyone holding his breath. I have always believed that Roose grew to his full height as a man in the purgatorial crisis of a penalty, drying off the clay around his feet, washing away the dross which entered his character with the gold... Arthur's sword against the bare fist. Then came the signal; the ball travelled like a bolt from the foot of the penalty taking forward, and in the blink of an eyelid, revolution, a thump, and the ball landed in the heather and gorse of the Buarth."

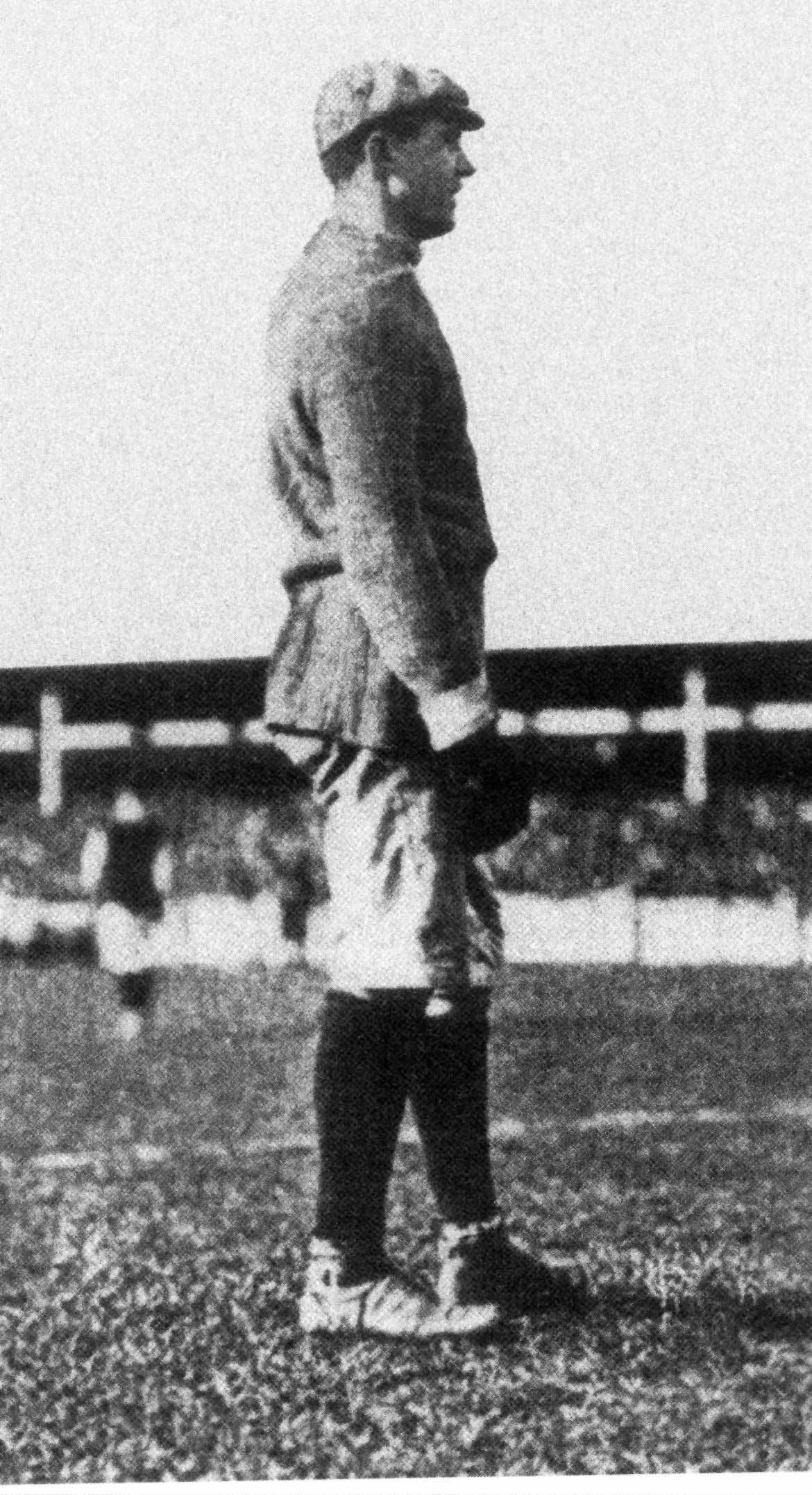
Roose models the typical attire of an Edwardian goalkeeper in an uncredited photo of c.1905. Note the apparent absence of shinpads and switch from iconic white gloves.

Physical size and agility have, nonetheless, never been sufficient, on their own, to qualify a goalkeeper for greatness, and Jimmy Ashcroft, the Woolwich Arsenal goalkeeper, contributed an appreciation of Roose which singled him out for his bravery in diving at the feet of onrushing forwards:

"Last season when Stoke played Arsenal at Plumstead, I watched the Reds swoop down on Roose like a whirlwind. There was a scrimmage in goal and Roose was down on the ball like a shot with a heap of Arsenal and Stoke players on top of him. It was all Lombard Street [the site of the Bank of England] to a penny orange that the Reds would score. Presently from out of the ruck emerged Roose clinging to the ball, which he promptly threw away up the field. I'll bet that the thrill of triumph which went through him was ample compensation for any hard knocks he received."

For all this, Roose's popularity as a goalkeeper was based only partly on his abilities; he was also one of the great crowd-pleasers of the Edwardian period. Supporters recall him putting on gymnastic displays from his crossbar when play was safely at the other end of the pitch. At a time when other goalkeepers walked onto the pitch at the beginning of a game, Roose was also unusual in running on briskly, acknowledging the crowd's applause. When a penalty was awarded, he frequently waved to spectators both before and after completing a save.

Roose generally carried a pair of white gloves onto the pitch but preferred to play with bare hands in good weather. He was regarded as unusual for insisting on playing in padded kneebandages and a twin-peak cap.

Leigh Richmond Roose was an early example of the familiar adage that "goalkeepers are different", a point he made himself in an article on goalkeeping contributed to the four-volume 1906 work Association Football and the Men Who Made It. "There is a proverb," he wrote, "which says, 'Before you go to war, say a prayer; before going to sea say two prayers; before marrying say three prayers.' One might add: 'Before deciding to become a goalkeeper say four prayers.' He's the Aunt Sally."

Considering the goalkeeping ideal, Roose added elsewhere in the same article:

"A tall man able to get down to low shots is certainly preferable to a short one, for he can reach shots that no little man can get near, and if his bigness in stature is combined with weight he will find occasions on which his height and weight will prove of great advantage to him; yet he should not come under Dryden's description: 'Brawn without brain is thine.' He should possess quickness of eye and hand, activity and agility, and be as light on his feet as a dancing master. It's not much use for a man who can only move 'once in about two months' trying to defend a space 24 feet wide and 8 feet high against shots coming in from all possible directions, and when there is only a fraction of a second allowed to get a ball and get rid of it, by either kicking, catching or throwing out, or punching away with forwards on top of him."

"To a goalkeeper alone," Roose concluded, "is the true delight of goalkeeping known. He must be an instinctive lover of the game, otherwise goalkeeping will take it out of a man if he is not devoted to it."

For all this, Leigh Roose was prone to displays of bad temper throughout his club career and once assaulted one of the Sunderland directors, beating him so badly that the Football Association banned him for 14 days. The early sportswriter "Tityrus" (the pen-name of JAH Catton, editor of the Athletic News) recorded that during the half-time interval in Wales's heavy 1908 defeat by England, Roose – who had been injured by an opposition forward – "had an unpleasant conversation with the England selectors, who thought that the speech of the goalkeeper was not such as might be expected from a gentleman."

== Anecdotes ==
Tales of Roose's eccentricities appeared frequently in newspapers and books published during his career. Some have been picked up by later writers and repeated many times, particularly in books concerning goalkeeping. A good deal of further research would be necessary to verify the truth of some of the stories, but the following were commonly told while Roose himself was still alive.

- While playing for Stoke, Roose was reputed to have missed a train to take him from London to a game at Aston Villa. In the years before World War I, railway companies kept private trains ready at a platform for hire by wealthy travellers. Roose engaged such a train and had it take him, in solitary splendour, to Birmingham at 5/- a mile plus the ordinary fare. Upon arrival, he arranged for the resultant £31 bill – a fortune at the time – to be sent to his club.
- When the Football League requested a copy of the expenses claim Roose had submitted to the Sunderland club. This account arrived at their headquarters listed, as its first item, "Using the toilet (twice), 2d." [2 old pence]
- On 23 April 1910, Roose, by then a very famous former Stoke player, guested – along with Herbert Chapman – for Port Vale in a match against Stoke Reserves that would decide the winner of the North Staffordshire and District League. Roose not only insisted on playing against his former club while wearing his old Stoke shirt but aroused the ire of the 7,000-strong crowd with his breathtaking play. He "saved every shot with such arrogant ease that the furious crowd spilt onto the field, only the brave intervention of the local constabulary saving him from a ducking in the River Trent." In the course of the same fracas, Stoke's chairman, the Reverend A.E. Hurst, ran onto the pitch to appeal for calm and was knocked out by one of his own forwards. The result was appealed to the Staffordshire FA, which declared the championship void, and Stoke's ground was closed for the first fortnight of the 1910–11 season. Roose is reported to have said, in his own defence, that he had believed the game to be a friendly and had not realised a championship was at stake.
- Playing for Stoke against Liverpool at Anfield on 4 January 1902, Roose, along with his teammates, unwittingly ate a lunch of tainted fish. By kick-off time, many of the Stoke players were feeling the effects and – having conceded a goal after only eight minutes – Roose ran from the pitch in search of a toilet. He had a pulse rate of 148 and did not return to the game. At the start of the second half, only seven of the Stoke players were in a fit state to continue, and the dressing room resembled "the cabin of a cross-channel steamer in bad weather." Liverpool won the game 7–0.
- In March 1909, Roose travelled with Wales to play Ireland in a British Home Championship match. He appeared at Liverpool station with one hand heavily bandaged, telling the waiting press that he had broken two fingers but would nevertheless play in the match. Roose's Welsh team-mate Billy Meredith, suspecting trickery, peered through the keyhole of the goalkeeper's hotel room soon after they arrived in Belfast and saw his friend remove the bandage and wiggle his fingers with no sign of discomfort. News of Roose's disability having spread through the city, a huge and expectant crowd turned out the next day in the hope of witnessing an Irish victory. Instead, Wales won the game 3–2, Roose himself playing superbly.
- Like many footballers, Roose was famously superstitious, wearing a 'lucky shirt' beneath his goalkeeping jersey throughout his career. The shirt was said to have been an old black-and-green Aberystwyth top, but it was never washed. Some support for this story comes from a contemporary article in Bolton's Cricket and Football Field (March 1904), which observed: "Roose is one of the cleanest custodians we have, but he apparently is a trifle superstitious about his football garments, for he seldom seems to trouble the charwoman with them."

== Personal life ==
Roose enjoyed to the full the acclaim that his sporting exploits brought him. Contemporaries at Aberystwyth testified to his popularity with both men and women at the college. In London, in 1905, he was acclaimed by the Daily Mail as one of the capital's most eligible bachelors – second, the newspaper suggested, only to the cricketer Jack Hobbs. When the Daily Mail invited nominations for a World XI to face another planet, Roose was selected as the World team's goalkeeper by a large majority.

Much of Roose's popularity stemmed from his extrovert character. He led – according to his nephew, Dr Cecil Jenkins – an extremely glamorous life, keeping an apartment in the centre of the capital and buying his suits on Savile Row.

"The first thing I remember," the 101-year-old Jenkins told an interviewer,

"is him taking my mother and me just before the First World War to lunch at Scott's restaurant in Piccadilly. He was in full morning kit with a top hat – he was real man about town. I was only about five or six and it was very exciting for a young boy like me.

"He was very much a larger than life character who played to the gallery. When a carriage picked him up from the station to take him to the game, schoolboys would run after it."

One newspaper voted Roose among the 10 most recognisable faces in the London of this period, and he enjoyed relationships with several women, among them the great music hall star Marie Lloyd.

== Military service and death ==
Although well above the age of the average recruit, Roose joined the British Army on the outbreak of the First World War in 1914 and served in the Royal Army Medical Corps in France and Gallipoli. He returned to London and enlisted as a private of the Royal Fusiliers in 1916 and then returned to the Western Front, where his goalkeeping abilities resulted in his becoming a noted grenade thrower.

He was awarded the Military Medal for his bravery on the first occasion he saw action, the regimental history recording:

"Private Leigh Roose, who had never visited the trenches before, was in the sap when the flammenwerfer attack began. He managed to get back along the trench and, though nearly choked with fumes with his clothes burnt, refused to go to the dressing station. He continued to throw bombs until his arm gave out, and then, joining the covering party, used his rifle with great effect."

His award was gazetted on 21 September 1916.

Promoted to the rank of lance corporal, Roose was killed, aged 38, towards the end of the Battle of the Somme the next month. The exact location and manner of his death remain a matter of dispute.

His body was not recovered, and his name appears on the war memorial to missing soldiers at Thiepval. Due to a typographical error on his enlistment papers, his name was recorded as "Leigh Rouse", later corrected.

== Career statistics ==
=== Club ===
Appearances and goals by club, season and competition
Club	Season	League			FA Cup		Total	
Club	Season	Division	Apps	Goals	Apps	Goals	Apps	Goals
Stoke	1901–02	First Division	24	0	4	0	28	0
Stoke	1902–03	First Division	25	0	3	0	28	0
Stoke	1903–04	First Division	32	0	1	0	33	0
Everton	1904–05	First Division	18	0	6	0	24	0
Stoke	1905–06	First Division	33	0	2	0	35	0
Stoke	1906–07	First Division	30	0	2	0	32	0
Stoke	1907–08	Second Division	3	0	0	0	3	0
Sunderland	1907–08	First Division	14	0	0	0	14	0
Sunderland	1908–09	First Division	35	0	4	0	39	0
Sunderland	1909–10	First Division	31	0	3	0	34	0
Sunderland	1910–11	First Division	12	0	0	0	12	0
Celtic (loan)	1909–10	Scottish 1st Division	0	0	1	0	1	0
Huddersfield Town	1910–11	Second Division	5	0	0	0	5	0
Aston Villa	1911–12	First Division	10	0	0	0	10	0
Woolwich Arsenal	1911–12	First Division	13	0	0	0	13	0
Career total			285	0	26	0	311	0

=== International ===
National team	Year	Apps	Goals
Wales	1900	1	0
Wales	1901	3	0
Wales	1902	2	0
Wales	1904	1	0
Wales	1905	2	0
Wales	1906	3	0
Wales	1907	3	0
Wales	1908	2	0
Wales	1909	3	0
Wales	1910	3	0
Wales	1911	1	0
Total		24	0

== Bibliography ==
- Wilson, Jonathon (2012). The Outsider: A History of the Goalkeeper. Hachette UK. ISBN 9781409123200.
- The Dictionary of Welsh Biography Down to 1940. London: Honourable Society of Cymmrodorion. 1959.
- Shaw, Karl (2009). Curing Hiccups with Small Fires: A Delightful Miscellany of Great British Eccentrics. Pan MacMillan. ISBN 9780752227030.
- Williams, Gareth (2007). Sport: A Literary Anthology. Summersdale Publishers. ISBN 9781848397255.

=== Further reading ===
- Catton, J.A.H. ("Tityrus") (2006). The Story of Association Football. Cleethorpes: Soccer Books. ISBN 1-86223-119-2.
- Hazelwood, Nick (1996). In The Way! Goalkeepers: A Breed Apart?. Edinburgh: Mainstream Publishing.
- Hodgson, Francis (1998). Only The Goalkeeper To Beat. London: Macmillan.
- Vignes, Spencer (2007). Lost in France: The Remarkable Life And Death of Leigh Richmond Roose Football's First Playboy. Stadia. ISBN 978-0-7524-4338-6.
- Wall, Sir Frederick (2006). 50 Years of Football 1884–1934. Cleethorpes: Soccer Books.

=== Articles ===
- Geraint Jenkins. "Leigh Richmond Roose". In Peter Stead and Huw Richards (eds), For Club and Country: Welsh Football Greats (2000). Cardiff: University of Wales Press.
- Leigh Richmond Roose. 'The Art of Goalkeeping'. In Alfred Gibson and William Pickford (eds), Association Football and the Men Who Made It (4 vols., 1906). London: The Caxton Publishing Company. I, 97–102.
