= Freddie Johnson =

English footballer

Personal information
- Full name: Fredrick Johnson
- Date of birth: 1878
- Place of birth: Stoke-upon-Trent, England
- Position: Right winger

Senior career*
Years	Team	Apps	(Gls)
1894	Stoke St.Peters		
1895–1903	Stoke	175	(19)
- * Club domestic league appearances and goals

Fredrick Johnson (born 1878) was an English footballer who played in the Football League for Stoke.

== Career ==
Johnson joined Stoke from local side Stoke St. Peters when, at just 12 years old, he was involved in a 44–0 victory over Bucknall St. Mary's. He was a speedy winger and made his debut in the 1895–96 season where he played in nine matches scoring once. In 1897–98 Stoke struggled throughout the campaign and finished in bottom place. They entered the end of season test matches with Newcastle United and Burnley Johnson played in all four matches including the final match against Burnley where both teams went into the match knowing that a draw would see them remain in the First Division and throughout the 90 minutes not a single attempt on goal was made, this led to the introduction of automatic promotion and relegation.

Stoke had a far better 1898–99 season as they reached the semi-final of the FA Cup for the first time in their history, losing 3–1 to Derby County. He enjoyed his most productive season in 1900–01 where he played in every match. He remained with Stoke until his retirement in 1903 after playing 194 matches scoring 20 goals.

== Career statistics ==
Appearances and goals by club, season and competition
Club	Season	League			FA Cup		Test Match		Total	
Club	Season	Division	Apps	Goals	Apps	Goals	Apps	Goals	Apps	Goals
Stoke	1895–96	First Division	8	1	1	0	—		9	1
Stoke	1896–97	First Division	14	3	1	0	—		15	3
Stoke	1897–98	First Division	12	1	0	0	4	0	16	1
Stoke	1898–99	First Division	26	3	6	1	—		32	4
Stoke	1899–1900	First Division	29	1	1	0	—		30	1
Stoke	1900–01	First Division	34	5	3	0	—		37	5
Stoke	1901–02	First Division	29	3	4	0	—		33	3
Stoke	1902–03	First Division	23	2	1	0	—		24	2
Career Total			175	19	17	1	4	0	196	20
