= Sam Higginson =

English footballer

Personal information
- Full name: Samuel Higginson
- Date of birth: 1880
- Place of birth: Goldenhill, England
- Date of death: 1930 (aged 50)
- Position: Forward

Senior career*
Years	Team	Apps	(Gls)
1898	Goldenhill Wanderers		
1899–1903	Stoke	111	(21)
1904–1905	Reading		
1906–1908	Bradford City	56	(6)
Total		167	(27)
- * Club domestic league appearances and goals

Samuel Higginson (1880 – 1930) was an English footballer who played in the Football League for Bradford City Stoke.

== Career ==
Higginson played football with his local amateur side Goldenhill Wanderers before moving to Stoke in 1899. He immediately became a first team regular making 33 appearances in his first season as a professional. He was used as both a centre forward or centre back due to his physical qualities and he carried on been a key member of the Stoke side during the early 1900s as the side struggled on compete in the First Division. He left for Reading in 1904 after making over 120 appearances for Stoke. His spell at Reading was a short one as he left for Bradford City a season later where he finished his career.

== Career statistics ==
Appearances and goals by club, season and competition
Club	Season	League			FA Cup		Total	
Club	Season	Division	Apps	Goals	Apps	Goals	Apps	Goals
Stoke	1899–1900	First Division	31	3	2	0	33	3
Stoke	1900–01	First Division	18	5	2	0	20	5
Stoke	1901–02	First Division	30	6	4	1	34	7
Stoke	1902–03	First Division	12	4	3	0	15	4
Stoke	1903–04	First Division	20	3	1	1	21	4
Stoke	Total		111	21	12	2	123	23
Bradford City	1906–07	Second Division	19	1	0	0	19	1
Bradford City	1907–08	Second Division	35	2	2	0	37	2
Bradford City	1908–09	First Division	2	0	0	0	2	0
Bradford City	Total		56	6	2	0	56	6
Career Total			167	27	14	2	181	29
