= Arthur Capes =

English footballer (1875–1945)

Personal information
- Full name: Arthur John Capes
- Date of birth: 23 February 1875
- Place of birth: Burton upon Trent, England
- Date of death: 26 February 1945 (aged 70)
- Place of death: Burton upon Trent, England
- Height: 5 ft 8 in (1.73 m)
- Position: Inside forward

Senior career*
Years	Team	Apps	(Gls)
1894–1895	Burton Wanderers	57	(23)
1896–1901	Nottingham Forest	168	(33)
1902–1904	Stoke	60	(18)
1904–1905	Bristol City	29	(7)
1905–1906	Swindon Town	22	(5)
Total		336	(86)

International career
1903	England	1	(0)
- * Club domestic league appearances and goals

Arthur John Capes (23 February 1875 – 26 February 1945) was an English footballer who played in the Football League for Bristol City, Burton Wanderers, Nottingham Forest and Stoke.

Capes played with his brother Adrian at Burton Wanderers before joining Nottingham Forest in 1896. He won the 1898 FA Cup with Forest and scored 42 goals for the club in 197 games. He spent two seasons at Stoke scoring 20 goals in 65 matches and ended his career with Bristol City and Swindon Town. He earned one cap for England in 1903 whilst with Stoke.

== Career ==
Capes was born in Burton upon Trent and began his career at Burton Wanderers along with his brother Adrian. He and his brother formed a formidable partnership and in two seasons with Burton the pair scored 66 goals between them. This brought the attention of bigger clubs and they both signed for Nottingham Forest in August 1896. Adrian failed to make a lasting impression at Forest leaving after two seasons, but Arthur did scoring in the 1898 FA Cup final as Forest beat archrivals Derby County 3–1.

Capes became a vital part of the Forest squad and spent six seasons at the City Ground making 197 appearances scoring 42 goals. He left for Stoke in 1902 becoming the second member of Nottingham's cup winning team to join the "Potters" following Len Benbow. Unlike Benbow, Capes lived up to the expectations of the Stoke fans scoring nine goals in 1902–03 and eleven in 1903–04. After his two-season spell at the Victoria Ground Capes spent a season each at Bristol City and then Swindon Town.

== Career statistics ==
=== Club ===
Club	Season	League			FA Cup		Total	
Club	Season	Division	Apps	Goals	Apps	Goals	Apps	Goals
Burton Wanderers	1894–95	Second Division	30	13	5	8	35	21
Burton Wanderers	1895–96	Second Division	27	10	2	0	29	10
Burton Wanderers	Total		57	23	7	8	64	31
Nottingham Forest	1896–97	First Division	30	8	2	0	32	8
Nottingham Forest	1897–98	First Division	26	8	6	4	32	12
Nottingham Forest	1898–99	First Division	28	3	3	1	31	4
Nottingham Forest	1899–1900	First Division	27	5	4	3	31	8
Nottingham Forest	1900–01	First Division	32	8	2	0	34	8
Nottingham Forest	1901–02	First Division	25	1	4	0	29	1
Nottingham Forest	Total		168	33	23	9	197	42
Stoke	1902–03	First Division	32	7	4	2	36	9
Stoke	1903–04	First Division	28	11	1	0	29	11
Stoke	Total		60	18	5	2	65	20
Bristol City	1904–05	Second Division	29	7	5	0	34	7
Swindon Town	1905–06	Southern League	22	5	2	1	24	6
Career Total			336	86	42	20	378	106

=== International ===
National team	Year	Apps	Goals
England	1903	1	0
Total		1	0

== Honours ==
Nottingham Forest

- FA Cup winner: 1898
