= Tom Wilkes (footballer) =

English footballer

Personal information
- Full name: Thomas Henry Wilkes
- Date of birth: 19 May 1874
- Place of birth: Alcester, England
- Date of death: 1921 (aged 47)
- Position: Goalkeeper

Senior career*
Years	Team	Apps	(Gls)
1891–1894	Redditch Town		
1894–1897	Aston Villa	66	(0)
1897–1898	→ Stoke (loan)	5	(0)
1899–1903	Stoke	74	(0)
Total		145	(0)
- * Club domestic league appearances and goals

Thomas Henry Wilkes (19 May 1874 – 1921) was an English footballer who played in the Football League for Aston Villa and Stoke.

== Career ==
Wilkes was born in Alcester and played amateur football with Redditch Town before joining Aston Villa in 1894. Wilkes enjoyed a considerable amount of success at Villa, winning the English league title on three occasions as well as earning two FA Cup victories. The best season he enjoyed was in 1895–96 as he only missed once match of Villa's title-winning season. However, he lost his place to Billy George; Wilkes subsequently went on loan to Stoke towards the end of the 1897–98 season.

Stoke were struggling at the bottom of the First Division before Wilkes joined; when he became a part of the team and played in the final five matches of the season, Stoke went unbeaten. It mattered little, however, as Stoke still finished bottom on goal average after finishing level on points with four teams. They had to play the end-of-season test matches against the best teams in the Second Division in order to stay up. In the final match against Burnley, both teams went into the match knowing that a draw would see them remain in the First Division, and throughout the 90 minutes, not a single attempt on goal was made; this led to the introduction of automatic promotion and relegation.

Wilkes returned to Villa at the end of the season and played four matches in 1898–99 before he rejoined Stoke on a permanent basis in 1899. He played four seasons for Stoke before retiring in 1903. He later owned the Wharf Tavern in Stoke.

== Career statistics ==
Appearances and goals by club, season and competition
Club	Season	League			FA Cup		Test Match		Total	
Club	Season	Division	Apps	Goals	Apps	Goals	Apps	Goals	Apps	Goals
Aston Villa	1894–95	First Division	20	0	5	0	—		25	0
Aston Villa	1895–96	First Division	29	0	1	0	—		30	0
Aston Villa	1896–97	First Division	8	0	5	0	—		13	0
Aston Villa	1897–98	First Division	5	0	0	0	—		5	0
Aston Villa	1898–99	First Division	4	0	0	0	—		4	0
Aston Villa	Total		66	0	11	0	—		77	0
Stoke (loan)	1897–98	First Division	5	0	0	0	4	0	9	0
Stoke	1899–1900	First Division	31	0	2	0	—		33	0
Stoke	1900–01	First Division	27	0	3	0	—		30	0
Stoke	1901–02	First Division	8	0	0	0	—		8	0
Stoke	1902–03	First Division	8	0	1	0	—		9	0
Stoke	Total		79	0	6	0	4	0	89	0
Career total			145	0	17	0	4	0	166	0

== Honours ==
Aston Villa

- Football League First Division champion: 1895–96, 1896–97, 1898–99
- FA Cup winner: 1894–95, 1896–97
