= Charlie Burgess =

English footballer (1883–1956)

Personal information
- Full name: Charles Burgess
- Date of birth: 25 December 1883
- Place of birth: Church Lawton, England
- Date of death: 1956
- Place of death: Hartshill, England
- Position: Full back

Senior career*
Years	Team	Apps	(Gls)
- Butt Lane Swifts
1901–1908	Stoke	179	(0)
1908–1910	Manchester City	32	(0)
Total		211	(0)
- * Club domestic league appearances and goals

Charles Burgess (25 December 1883 – 1956) was an English footballer who played in the Football League for Manchester City and Stoke.

== Career ==
Burgess was born in Church Lawton and played amateur football with Butt Lane Swifts before joining Stoke in 1901, he apparently signed the contract with Stoke whilst sitting on a haystack at his father's farm. He soon became a regular member of Horace Austerberry's squad at a time when Stoke were struggling financially it came as a welcome relief to find a very capable local player. He was a solid defender who produce some hard but fair challenges on opponents. He remained with Stoke until they went bankrupt in 1908 and Burgess joined Manchester City after making 195 appearances for Stoke. His time at Hyde Road was hampered by a knee injury which eventually caused him to retire.

== Personal life ==
Burgess served in the Royal Army Medical Corps during the First World War, firstly at No. 28 Casualty Clearing Station in Fouilloy, France and latterly at 49th Stationary Hospital in Bralos, Greece. He contracted malaria during the Salonika Campaign.

== Career statistics ==
Appearances and goals by club, season and competition
Club	Season	League			FA Cup		Total	
Club	Season	Division	Apps	Goals	Apps	Goals	Apps	Goals
Stoke	1901–02	First Division	3	0	1	0	4	0
Stoke	1902–03	First Division	31	0	4	0	35	0
Stoke	1903–04	First Division	22	0	0	0	22	0
Stoke	1904–05	First Division	15	0	0	0	15	0
Stoke	1905–06	First Division	35	0	2	0	37	0
Stoke	1906–07	First Division	36	0	3	0	39	0
Stoke	1907–08	Second Division	37	0	6	0	43	0
Stoke	Total		179	0	16	0	195	0
Manchester City	1908–09	First Division	26	0	0	0	26	0
Manchester City	1909–10	Second Division	4	0	0	0	4	0
Manchester City	1910–11	First Division	2	0	0	0	2	0
Manchester City	Total		32	0	0	0	32	0
Career total			211	0	16	0	227	0

== Honours ==
Manchester City

- Football League Second Division: 1909–10
