= Arthur Lockett =

English footballer

Personal information
- Full name: Arthur Lockett
- Date of birth: 11 March 1877
- Place of birth: Alsager, England
- Date of death: 5 March 1959 (aged 81)
- Position: Outside left

Senior career*
Years	Team	Apps	(Gls)
1895	Alsager's Bank		
1896	Audley		
1897	Cross Heath		
1898	Audley		
1899	Crewe Alexandra		
1900–1903	Stoke	65	(7)
1903–1904	Aston Villa	41	(5)
1905–1907	Preston North End	64	(5)
1908–1912	Watford	141	(1)
1912	Mardy		
Total		311	(18)

International career
1903	England	1	(0)
- * Club domestic league appearances and goals

Arthur Lockett (11 March 1877 – 5 March 1959) was an English footballer who played in the Football League for Aston Villa, Preston North End and Stoke.

== Club career ==
Lockett was born in Alsager and played for local amateur sides Alsager's Bank, Audley and Cross Heath before joining Crewe Alexandra. He joined Stoke in 1900 for a small fee and played 16 times during the 1900–01 season as Stoke fought a successful battle against relegation. The next season saw Stoke again in relegation trouble and for the second season running surviving on the final day. Lockett experience a much better 1902–03 campaign as Stoke finished 6th, their highest league position to that point. Lockett's good form was rewarded as he was called up for England duties in February 1903.

Before the season was finished Lockett joined Aston Villa where he spent two season before joining Preston North End.

== International career ==
Lockett played one game for England whilst with Stoke, which came in a 4–0 win over Ireland in February 1903.

== Career statistics ==
=== Club ===
Club	Season	League			FA Cup		Total	
Club	Season	Division	Apps	Goals	Apps	Goals	Apps	Goals
Stoke	1900–01	First Division	16	0	0	0	16	0
Stoke	1901–02	First Division	27	5	4	0	31	5
Stoke	1902–03	First Division	22	2	4	0	26	2
Stoke	Total		65	7	8	0	73	7
Aston Villa	1902–03	First Division	1	0	0	0	1	0
Aston Villa	1903–04	First Division	27	2	0	0	27	2
Aston Villa	1904–05	First Division	13	3	0	0	13	3
Aston Villa	Total		41	5	0	0	41	5
Preston North End	1905–06	First Division	32	4	1	0	33	4
Preston North End	1906–07	First Division	23	1	0	0	23	1
Preston North End	1907–08	First Division	9	0	1	0	10	0
Preston North End	Total		64	5	2	0	66	5
Watford	1908–09	Southern League	37	0	0	0	37	0
Watford	1909–10	Southern League	37	0	0	0	37	0
Watford	1910–11	Southern League	38	0	0	0	38	0
Watford	1911–12	Southern League	29	1	0	0	29	1
Watford	Total		141	1	0	0	141	1
Career total			311	18	10	0	321	18

=== International ===
National team	Year	Apps	Goals
England	1903	1	0
Total		1	0
