= James Bradley (footballer) =

English footballer (1881–1954)

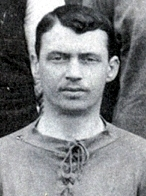

Personal information
- Full name: James Edwin Bradley
- Date of birth: 5 May 1881
- Place of birth: Goldenhill, Stoke-upon-Trent, England
- Date of death: 12 March 1954 (aged 72)
- Place of death: Blackpool, England
- Position: Wing half

Senior career*
Years	Team	Apps	(Gls)
1897	Goldenhill Wanderers		
1898–1905	Stoke	199	(4)
1905–1911	Liverpool	169	(5)
1911–1913	Reading		
1913–1915	Stoke	30	(2)
1915	Goldenhill Wanderers		
Total		398	(11)
- * Club domestic league appearances and goals

James Bradley (5 May 1881 – 12 March 1954) was an English footballer who played in the Football League for Liverpool and Stoke.

== Career ==
=== Stoke ===
Born in Goldenhill, Stoke-upon-Trent, and joined Stoke from amateur side Goldenhill Wanderers as a 16-year-old in February 1898. Weighing 11 st (70 kg) and standing at 6 ft (1.83 m) Bradley played at wing half and oozed class. The Sentinel described him as having an old head on young shoulders with "a fine turn of speed who tackles with excellent judgement". As a consequence of Alex Raisbeck's transfer to Liverpool, Bradley found himself part of a youthful, hard working half-back line featuring 23-year-old Alf Wood and fellow teenager Edward Parsons and in the first season of this trio Stoke reached their first FA Cup semi-final losing out 3–1 to Derby County.

Following the departure of Parsons and Wood in 1900–01, 23-year-old Bradley found himself as the most experienced midfielder at the club. Now partnered by Tom Holford and George Baddeley this new half-back line helped keep Stoke in the First Division for five more years. The press described Bradley as 'a model of consistency' but he was also a skilful player who became one of the first to use tricks. He would swing hard at the ball with his right foot and dummy the player facing him by kicking the ball with the outside of his left. Despite the quality of their midfield, year after year Stoke narrowly clung on to their top-flight status. Improvements to the Victoria Ground in 1903 cost £2,000 swallowing the club's already dwindling finances and so the board agreed to sell their best players with Bradley poised to join Plymouth Argyle in 1905. But he refused to join the Southern side was instead sold to Liverpool for £420.

=== Liverpool ===
Making his debut in a Football League Division One match against Birmingham at Anfield on 23 September 1905 a game that the Reds won 2–0, he scored his first goal, the opening goal of the 4–1 home victory over Newcastle, 18 months later on 23 March 1907. Bradley, a left half-back, played 31 matches in his first season which saw him gain a championship medal as the Liverpool took the title by 4 points beating Preston into second spot. Bradley had an eventful Christmas Day in 1909, regular goalkeeper Sam Hardy's absence saw Bradley take on the role, Bolton were the opposition and they had a shock as Bradley kept a clean sheet as Liverpool went on to hit the net three times. Bradley remained a regular member of the Liverpool starting line-up over the next four years missing just 18 matches. Bradley lost his place during the 1910–11 season and left the club at the end of the season joining Reading in the Southern League.

=== Return to Stoke ===
He re-joined Stoke in 1913 who thanks to more financial problems were now playing in the Southern League. He still had the quality to inspire Stoke to the Division Two title in 1914–15 which saw Stoke regain their Football League status. He retired at the end of the season and went on to work for the Stoke-on-Trent highways department and for a short time did part-time coaching for Stoke's reserves before living out the rest of life in Blackpool.

== Person life ==
His brother, Martin (1886–1958) played at inside forward for Grimsby Town, Sheffield Wednesday and Bristol Rovers between 1907 and 1914.

Martin's son Jack (1916–2002) played at inside forward for various clubs in the 1930s and 1940s, including Swindon Town, Southampton and Bolton Wanderers.

== Career statistics ==
Appearances and goals by club, season and competition
Club	Season	League			FA Cup		Other		Total	
Club	Season	Division	Apps	Goals	Apps	Goals	Apps	Goals	Apps	Goals
Stoke	1898–99	First Division	26	0	6	0	—		32	0
Stoke	1899–1900	First Division	33	0	2	0	—		35	0
Stoke	1900–01	First Division	34	0	3	0	—		37	0
Stoke	1901–02	First Division	23	0	2	0	—		25	0
Stoke	1902–03	First Division	29	2	4	0	—		33	2
Stoke	1903–04	First Division	29	2	1	0	—		30	2
Stoke	1904–05	First Division	25	0	2	0	—		27	0
Stoke	Total		199	4	20	0	—		219	4
Liverpool	1905–06	First Division	32	0	5	0	1 (Note: Appearance in the 1905 Sheriff of London Charity Shield)	0	38	0
Liverpool	1906–07	First Division	36	1	4	0	—		40	1
Liverpool	1907–08	First Division	34	3	4	3	—		38	6
Liverpool	1908–09	First Division	34	1	2	0	—		36	1
Liverpool	1909–10	First Division	30	0	0	0	—		30	0
Liverpool	1910–11	First Division	3	0	0	0	—		3	0
Liverpool	Total		169	5	15	3	1	0	185	8
Stoke	1913–14	Southern League Division Two	12	1	3	0	—		15	1
Stoke	1914–15	Southern League Division Two	18	1	4	0	—		22	1
Stoke	Total		30	2	7	0	—		37	2
Career total			398	11	42	3	1	0	441	14

== Honours ==
Liverpool

- Football League First Division champion: 1905–06

Stoke

- Southern League Division Two champion: 1914–15
