= 1894–95 Manchester City F.C. season =

English football club season

Manchester City F.C.
1894–95 season
- Manager: Joshua Parlby
- Football League: 9th
- Top goalscorer: League: Finnerhan (15 goals); All: Finnerhan (15 goals)
- Highest home attendance: 14,000 vs Newton Heath (3 November 1894)
- Lowest home attendance: 2,000 vs Lincoln City (23 March 1895)

The 1894–95 season was Manchester City F.C.'s fourth season of league football and third season in the Football League.

In their first season after Ardwick A.F.C.'s reformation as Manchester City, the team fared somewhat better than in their previous season, including recording a record league score of 11–3 at home against Lincoln City, though in this season City for the only time in their history declined to enter the FA Cup (the following season they entered but chose to withdraw later). The season also marks the first season with club legend Billy Meredith on the teamsheet - arguably City's first (chronologically) player of legendary status, and was the first season in which a player scored more than ten goals over the course of one season, partially because of the increasing size of the Football League's Second Division.

== Football League Second Division ==
Pos	Team	Pld	W	D	L	GF	GA	GAv	Pts
7	Burton Wanderers	30	14	7	9	67	39	1.718	35
8	Woolwich Arsenal	30	14	6	10	75	58	1.293	34
9	Manchester City	30	14	3	13	82	72	1.139	31
10	Newcastle United	30	12	3	15	72	84	0.857	27
11	Burton Swifts	30	11	3	16	52	74	0.703	25

Rules for classification: 1) Points; 2) Goal average; 3) Goals scored

=== Results summary ===
Overall								Home						Away					
Pld	W	D	L	GF	GA	GAv	Pts	W	D	L	GF	GA	Pts	W	D	L	GF	GA	Pts
30	14	3	13	82	72	1.139	31	9	3	3	56	28	21	5	0	10	26	44	10

Source: rsssf.com

=== Reports ===
1 September 1894 1	Bury	4–2	Manchester City	Bury
	Barbour 40', 85'; Ostler 41'; Millar 82'	Report	Little 3'; Calvey 45'	Stadium: Gigg Lane; Attendance: 7,000; Referee: TS Ashmole

3 September 1894 2	Manchester City	1–1	Burton Wanderers	Manchester
	Little	Report	Capes	Stadium: Hyde Road; Attendance: 2,500

8 September 1894 3	Manchester City	4–1	Burslem Port Vale	Manchester
	Mann; Calvey; Finnerhan	Report	Wood	Stadium: Hyde Road; Attendance: 4,000

15 September 1894 4	Walsall Town Swifts	1–2	Manchester City	Walsall
	O'Brien	Report	Finnerhan; Rowan	Stadium: West Bromwich Road; Attendance: 4,000

22 September 1894 5	Manchester City	2–5	Grimsby Town	Manchester
	Wallace; Little; Jones (red card) 88'	Report	Fletcher; McCairns (red card) 88'; Rose; Ecclestone	Stadium: Hyde Road; Attendance: 5,000

29 September 1894 6	Woolwich Arsenal	4–2	Manchester City	London
	Mortimer; Boyd	Report	Dyer; Rowan	Stadium: Manor Ground; Attendance: 5,000

1 October 1894 7	Rotherham Town	3–2	Manchester City	Rotherham
	Manson; McCormick	Report	Calvey	Stadium: Clifton Grove; Attendance: 1,500

6 October 1894 8	Manchester City	6–1	Walsall Town Swifts	Manchester
	Finnerhan; Rowan; Sharples; Nash	Report	Leatherbarrow	Stadium: Hyde Road; Attendance: 3,000

13 October 1894 9	Notts County	1–3	Manchester City	Nottingham
	Logan	Report	Rowan; Finnerhan; Sharples	Stadium: Trent Bridge; Attendance: 3,000

20 October 1894 10	Manchester City	2–4	Darwen	Manchester
	Sharples; Tompkinson	Report	Hartley; Maxwell; King; Townley	Stadium: Hyde Road; Attendance: 6,000

27 October 1894 11	Newcastle United	5–4	Manchester City	Newcastle upon Tyne
	Thompson; Graham; Dickson	Report	Finnerhan; McReddie; Sharples	Stadium: St James' Park; Attendance: 2,000

3 November 1894 12	Manchester City	2–5	Newton Heath	Manchester
	Meredith	Report	Smith; Clarkin	Stadium: Hyde Road; Attendance: 14,000

10 November 1894 13	Burton Swifts	2–1	Manchester City	Burton upon Trent
	Willocks; Campbell	Report	Finnerhan	Stadium: Peel Croft; Attendance: 2,000

8 December 1894 14	Manchester City	3–3	Bury	Manchester
	Rowan 10'; Milarvie 17'; McReddie 23'	Report	Lee 53', 66'; Plant 65'	Stadium: Hyde Road; Attendance: 10,000; Referee: A Scragg

15 December 1894 15	Manchester City	4–1	Woolwich Arsenal	Manchester
	Meredith; McBride; Powell (o.g.)	Report	Buchanan	Stadium: Hyde Road; Attendance: 5,000

26 December 1894 16	Burton Wanderers	8–0	Manchester City	Burton upon Trent
	Capes; Rose; Lowe; Garfield; Brown	Report		Stadium: Derby Turn; Attendance: 4,000

31 December 1894 17	Crewe Alexandra	2–3	Manchester City	Crewe
	Unknown (o.g.); Salisbury	Report	Finnerhan; Meredith	Stadium: Alexandra Recreation Ground; Attendance: 450

1 January 1895 18	Manchester City	1–0	Rotherham Town	Manchester
	Rowan	Report		Stadium: Hyde Road; Attendance: 4,000

5 January 1895 19	Newton Heath	4–1	Manchester City	Manchester
	Clarkin; Donaldson; Smith	Report	Sharples	Stadium: Bank Street; Attendance: 12,000

2 February 1895 20	Burslem Port Vale	1–2	Manchester City	Stoke-on-Trent
	Ray	Report	Finnerhan; McReddie	Stadium: Athletic Ground; Attendance: 1,500

9 February 1895 21	Manchester City	4–0	Newcastle United	Manchester
	Meredith; Rowan; Finnerhan	Report		Stadium: Hyde Road; Attendance: 8,000

2 March 1895 22	Lincoln City	0–2	Manchester City	Lincoln
		Report	Rowan 55', 90'	Stadium: John O'Gaunts; Attendance: 5,000; Referee: H Shelton

9 March 1895 23	Manchester City	7–1	Notts County	Manchester
	Finnerhan; McReddie; Meredith; Rowan; Sharples; Walker	Report	Bruce	Stadium: Hyde Road; Attendance: 7,000

16 March 1895 24	Leicester Fosse	3–1	Manchester City	Leicester
	McArthur; Hughes; Gordon	Report	Sharples	Stadium: Filbert Street; Attendance: 4,000

23 March 1895 25	Manchester City	11–3	Lincoln City	Manchester
	Milarvie; Rowan; Meredith; McReddie; Finnerhan	Report	Walker (o.g.); Lees; Smallman	Stadium: Hyde Road; Attendance: 2,000

30 March 1895 26	Manchester City	1–1	Leicester Fosse	Manchester
	McReddie	Report	Gordon	Stadium: Hyde Road; Attendance: 4,000

6 April 1895 27	Darwen	4–0	Manchester City	Darwen
	Shaw; Townley	Report		Stadium: Barley Bank; Attendance: 2,000

12 April 1895 28	Manchester City	4–1	Crewe Alexandra	Manchester
	Sharples; Finnerhan; Dyer; Meredith	Report	Pearson	Stadium: Hyde Road; Attendance: 4,000

13 April 1895 29	Manchester City	4–1	Burton Swifts	Manchester
	Sharples; Meredith; Mann; McNeill (o.g.)	Report	Paterson	Stadium: Hyde Road; Attendance: 4,000

20 April 1895 30	Grimsby Town	2–1	Manchester City	Grimsby
	Higgins; Fletcher	Report	Milarvie	Stadium: Abbey Park; Attendance: 6,000

== Squad statistics ==
=== Appearances and goals ===
Appearances for competitive matches only

No.	Pos	Nat	Player	Total		Division 1	
No.	Pos	Nat	Player	Apps	Goals	Apps	Goals
	DF	(Canada) CAN	Walter Bowman	10	0	10	0
	FW	(England) ENG	Mitchell Calvey	7	5	7	5
	MF	(Scotland) SCO	Frank Dyer	12	2	12	2
	DF	(Scotland) SCO	Archibald Ferguson	2	0	2	0
	FW	(England) ENG	Pat Finnerhan	30	15	30	15
	GK		George Hutchinson	7	0	7	0
	DF	(Wales) WAL	Robert Jones	18	0	18	0
	FW	(Scotland) SCO	Tommy Little	7	3	7	3
	MF	(Scotland) SCO	George Mann	18	2	18	2
	MF	(Scotland) SCO	James McBride	17	1	17	1
	FW	(Scotland) SCO	Wally McReddie	20	9	20	9
	FW	(Wales) WAL	Billy Meredith	18	12	18	12
	FW	(Scotland) SCO	Bob Milarvie	10	3	10	3
	MF	(England) ENG	Joseph Nash	17	1	17	1
	DF	(Scotland) SCO	David Robson	17	0	17	0
	FW	(Scotland) SCO	Sandy Rowan	24	12	24	12
	FW	(England) ENG	James Sharples	24	12	24	12
	DF		Henry Smith	18	0	18	0
	MF	(England) ENG	Harry Tompkinson	6	1	6	1
	DF	(Scotland) SCO	John Walker	19	1	19	1
	FW	(England) ENG	Alec Wallace	6	1	6	1
	GK	(England) ENG	Charlie Williams	23	0	23	0

=== Goals record ===
Rank	No.	Nat.	Po.	Name	League	Total
1		(England)	FW	Pat Finnerhan	15	15
2		(Wales)	FW	Billy Meredith	12	12
2		(Scotland)	FW	Sandy Rowan	12	12
2		(England)	FW	James Sharples	12	12
5		(Scotland)	FW	Wally McReddie	9	9
6		(England)	FW	Mitchell Calvey	5	5
7		(Scotland)	FW	Tommy Little	3	3
7		(Scotland)	FW	Bob Milarvie	3	3
9		(Scotland)	FW	Frank Dyer	2	2
9			MF	George Mann	2	2
11		(Scotland)	MF	James McBride	1	1
11		(England)	MF	Joseph Nash	1	1
11		(England)	MF	Harry Tompkinson	1	1
11		(Scotland)	DF	John Walker	1	1
11		(England)	FW	Alec Wallace	1	1
Total					80	80

== See also ==
- Manchester City F.C. seasons
