= 1894–95 Bury F.C. season =

Bury
1894–95 season
- Manager: H.S. Hamer
- Stadium: Gigg Lane
- Football League Second Division: 1st
- FA Cup: 2nd Round
- Top goalscorer: League: Harry Millar (17); All: Harry Millar (19)

The 1894–95 season was Bury F.C.'s 10th in existence and their first in the Football League Second Division. They became league champions after just one season.

== Statistics ==
No.	Pos	Nat	Player	Total		Division 2		F.A. Cup		Test Matches	
No.	Pos	Nat	Player	Apps	Goals	Apps	Goals	Apps	Goals	Apps	Goals
	DF	(Scotland) SCO	Billy Barbour	30	5	27	5	2	0	1	0
	DF	(England) ENG	Joe Clegg	27	3	24	3	2	0	1	0
	FW	(England) ENG	Reuben Crowther	2	0	2	0	0	0	0	0
	DF	(Scotland) SCO	Tommy Davidson	9	0	8	0	0	0	1	0
	DF	(England) ENG	Sam Davies	33	5	30	5	2	0	1	0
	FW	(Wales) WAL	Jack Edwards	2	1	2	1	0	0	0	0
	DF	(Scotland) SCO	John Gillespie	5	0	5	0	0	0	0	0
	FW	(Scotland) SCO	James Henderson	19	10	16	9	2	1	1	0
	DF	(Ireland) EIR	Joe Kirkland	5	0	5	0	0	0	0	0
	FW	(Scotland) SCO	Barney Lee	23	11	21	11	2	0	0	0
	GK	(England) ENG	John Lowe	27	0	25	0	2	0	0	0
	MF	(Scotland) SCO	George McNaughton	18	0	15	0	2	0	1	0
	FW	(Scotland) SCO	Harry Millar	31	19	28	17	2	1	1	1
	GK	(Scotland) SCO	Archie Montgomery	3	0	2	0	0	0	1	0
	DF	(Scotland) SCO	Jack Ostler	15	6	15	6	0	0	0	0
	GK	(England) ENG	Walter Park	3	0	3	0	0	0	0	0
	MF	(England) ENG	Jack Plant	32	12	29	10	2	2	1	0
	MF	(England) ENG	George Ross	33	1	30	1	2	0	1	0
	MF	(Scotland) SCO	Jonathan White	13	0	13	0	0	0	0	0
	MF	(Scotland) SCO	Tom Wyllie	33	7	30	7	2	0	1	0

== Competitions ==
=== Division 2 ===
1 September 1894 1	Bury	4–2	Manchester City	Bury
	Barbour; Millar; Ostler	Report	Calvey; Little	Stadium: Gigg Lane; Attendance: 8,000

8 September 1894 2	Bury	4–1	Crewe Alexandra	Bury
	Ostler; Barbour; Millar	Report	Bennett	Stadium: Gigg Lane; Attendance: 4,000

15 September 1894 3	Burslem Port Vale	1–2	Bury	Stoke-on-Trent
	Marple	Report	Millar; Plant	Stadium: Athletic Ground; Attendance: 5,000

18 September 1894 4	Bury	2–1	Rotherham Town	Bury
	Plant; Wyllie	Report	Ackroyd	Stadium: Gigg Lane; Attendance: 1,614

22 September 1894 5	Woolwich Arsenal	4–2	Bury	London
	Boyd; Henderson; O'Brien	Report	Davies (pen.); Barbour	Stadium: Manor Ground; Attendance: 5,000

29 September 1894 6	Bury	1–0	Darwen	Bury
	Ostler	Report		Stadium: Gigg Lane; Attendance: 7,000

6 October 1894 7	Bury	5–1	Grimsby Town	Bury
	Clegg; Wyllie; Ross; Ostler	Report	Rose	Stadium: Gigg Lane; Attendance: 4,000

20 October 1894 8	Crewe Alexandra	1–5	Bury	Crewe
	Peake	Report	Millar; Cartwright (o.g.)	Stadium: Alexandra Recreation Ground; Attendance: 2,000

27 October 1894 9	Walsall Town Swifts	0–3	Bury	Walsall
		Report	Millar; Ostler	Stadium: West Bromwich Road; Attendance: 1,000

3 November 1894 10	Bury	4–1	Newcastle United	Bury
	Lee; Millar; Ostler	Report	Thompson	Stadium: Gigg Lane; Attendance: 2,000

6 November 1894 11	Rotherham Town	2–3	Bury	Rotherham
	Coupar; McCormick; Ackroyd (red card) 80'	Report	Lee; Plant	Stadium: Clifton Grove

10 November 1894 12	Bury	4–0	Burslem Port Vale	Bury
	Henderson; Plant; Lee; Wyllie	Report		Stadium: Gigg Lane; Attendance: 2,000

17 November 1894 13	Burton Wanderers	1–2	Bury	Burton upon Trent
	Lowe	Report	Plant; Millar	Stadium: Derby Turn; Attendance: 3,000

24 November 1894 14	Notts County	2–1	Bury	West Bridgford
	Allsopp (pen.)	Report	Plant	Stadium: Trent Bridge; Attendance: 10,000

1 December 1894 15	Bury	2–0	Burton Swifts	Bury
	Davies 7' (pen.); Henderson 82'	Report		Stadium: Gigg Lane; Attendance: 3,000; Referee: E. Ramsbottom

8 December 1894 16	Manchester City	3–3	Bury	Manchester
	Rowan; Milarvie; McReddie	Report	Lee; Plant	Stadium: Hyde Road; Attendance: 10,000

15 December 1894 17	Darwen	0–1	Bury	Darwen
		Report	Lee	Stadium: Barley Bank; Attendance: 6,000

22 December 1894 18	Bury	4–0	Burton Wanderers	Bury
	Davies (pen.) (pen.); Wyllie; Plant	Report		Stadium: Gigg Lane; Attendance: 1,000

25 December 1894 19	Bury	4–1	Leicester Fosse	Bury
	Plant; Henderson	Report	McArthur	Stadium: Gigg Lane; Attendance: 5,041

26 December 1894 20	Lincoln City	1–3	Bury	Lincoln
	Burke	Report	Lee; Henderson; Wyllie	Stadium: John O'Gaunts; Attendance: 3,000; Referee: F. Townsend

1 January 1895 21	Bury	2–1	Notts County	Bury
	Millar; Clegg	Report	Allsopp	Stadium: Gigg Lane; Attendance: 9,838

5 January 1895 22	Grimsby Town	3–2	Bury	Grimsby
	McCairns; Riddoch; Fletcher	Report	Lindsay (o.g.); Millar	Stadium: Abbey Park; Attendance: 5,000

12 January 1895 23	Bury	4–1	Lincoln City	Bury
	Millar; Lee; Davies (pen.)	Report	Richardson	Stadium: Gigg Lane; Attendance: 3,000; Referee: T. Armitt

2 March 1895 24	Bury	2–0	Woolwich Arsenal	Bury
	Lee; Storer (o.g.)	Report		Stadium: Gigg Lane; Attendance: 2,000

16 March 1895 25	Newcastle United	1–0	Bury	Newcastle upon Tyne
	Thompson	Report		Stadium: St James' Park; Attendance: 5,000

2 April 1895 26	Bury	4–1	Walsall Town Swifts	Bury
	Wyllie; Henderson	Report	Taylor	Stadium: Gigg Lane; Attendance: 966

6 April 1895 27	Burton Swifts	0–1	Bury	Burton upon Trent
		Report	Henderson	Stadium: Peel Croft; Attendance: 2,000

12 April 1895 28	Newton Heath	2–2	Bury	Manchester
	Donaldson; Cassidy	Report	Millar; Wyllie	Stadium: Bank Street; Attendance: 15,000

15 April 1895 29	Bury	2–1	Newton Heath	Bury
	Barbour; Edwards	Report	Peters	Stadium: Gigg Lane; Attendance: 7,140

20 April 1895 30	Leicester Fosse	1–0	Bury	Leicester
	Gordon	Report		Stadium: Filbert Street; Attendance: 3,000

=== F.A. Cup ===
2 February 1895 1	Bury	4–1	Leicester Fosse	Bury
	Plant; Henderson; Millar	Report	McArthur	Stadium: Gigg Lane; Attendance: 3,200; Referee: J Tomlinson

16 February 1895 2	Bolton Wanderers	1–0	Bury	Bolton
	Cassidy	Report		Stadium: Pike's Lane; Attendance: 14,444

=== Test Matches ===
27 April 1895	Bury	1–0	Liverpool	Blackburn
	Millar; Montgomery (red card) 76'	Report		Stadium: Ewood Park; Attendance: 8,000

== Final league table ==
Pos	Team	Pld	W	D	L	GF	GA	GAv	Pts	Qualification or relegation
1	Bury (C, O, P)	30	23	2	5	78	33	2.364	48	Qualification for test matches
2	Notts County	30	17	5	8	75	45	1.667	39	Qualification for test matches
3	Newton Heath	30	15	8	7	78	44	1.773	38	Qualification for test matches
4	Leicester Fosse	30	15	8	7	72	53	1.358	38	
5	Grimsby Town	30	18	1	11	79	52	1.519	37	

Rules for classification: 1) Points; 2) Goal average; 3) Goals scored
(C) Champions; (O) Play-off winners; (P) Promoted

=== References ===
https://www.11v11.com/teams/bury/tab/matches/season/1895/
https://enfa.co.uk/
