= 1895–96 Manchester City F.C. season =

English football club season

Manchester City F.C.
1895–96 season
- Manager: Sam Ormerod
- Football League: 2nd
- FA Cup: Withdrew
- Top goalscorer: League: Meredith (12 goals); All: Meredith / Rowan (13
Home colours

The 1895–1896 season was Manchester City F.C.'s fifth season of league football and fourth season in the Football League.

== Football League Second Division ==
Pos	Team	Pld	W	D	L	GF	GA	GAv	Pts	Qualification or relegation
1	Liverpool (C, O, P)	30	22	2	6	106	32	3.313	46	Qualification for test matches
2	Manchester City	30	21	4	5	63	38	1.658	46	Qualification for test matches
3	Grimsby Town	30	20	2	8	82	38	2.158	42	
4	Burton Wanderers	30	19	4	7	69	40	1.725	42	
5	Newcastle United	30	16	2	12	73	50	1.460	34	

Rules for classification: 1) Points; 2) Goal average; 3) Goals scored
(C) Champions; (O) Play-off winners; (P) Promoted

=== Results summary ===
Overall								Home						Away					
Pld	W	D	L	GF	GA	GAv	Pts	W	D	L	GF	GA	Pts	W	D	L	GF	GA	Pts
30	21	4	5	63	38	1.658	46	12	3	0	37	9	27	9	1	5	26	29	19

Source: rsssf.com

=== Reports ===
Date	Opponents	H / A	Venue	Result F – A	Scorers	Attendance
7 September 1895	Woolwich Arsenal	A	Manor Ground	1–0	Meredith	8,000
9 September 1895	Rotherham Town	H	Hyde Road	2–0	Clifford, Little	3,000
14 September 1895	Leicester Fosse	H	Hyde Road	2–0	Finnerhan, Rowan	9,000
21 September 1895	Grimsby Town	A	Abbey Park	0–5		3,000
28 September 1895	Woolwich Arsenal	H	Hyde Road	1–0	Sharples	9,000
5 October 1895	Newton Heath	A	Bank Street	1–1	Rowan	10,000
12 October 1895	Darwen	H	Hyde Road	4–1	Rowan (2), Sharples, Chapman	10,000
19 October 1895	Crewe Alexandra	A	Alexandra Recreation Ground	2–0	Meredith, Finnerhan	3,000
26 October 1895	Grimsby Town	H	Hyde Road	2–1	Rowan, Little	14,000
2 November 1895	Darwen	A	Barley Bank	3–2	Meredith, Finnerhan, McReddie	4,000
4 November 1895	Rotherham Town	A	Clifton Lane	3–2	McReddie (2), Rowan	5,000
16 November 1895	Burton Wanderers	A	Derby Turn	1–4	Meredith	3,000
23 November 1895	Burton Wanderers	H	Hyde Road	1–1	Meredith	12,000
30 November 1895	Burton Swifts	A	Peel Croft	4–1	Rowan (2), Morris (2)	3,000
7 December 1895	Newton Heath	H	Hyde Road	2–1	Meredith, Hill	20,000
14 December 1895	Burslem Port Vale	H	Hyde Road	Abandoned at half-time 1 – 0	McBride	2,000
21 December 1895	Burslem Port Vale	A	Athletic Ground	Abandoned after 65 minutes 0 – 0		2,000
1 January 1896	Liverpool	A	Anfield	1–3	Rowan	15,000
4 January 1896	Newcastle United	H	Hyde Road	5–2	Morris (2), Hill (2), Finnerhan	10,000
11 January 1896	Lincoln City	A	Sincil Bank	2–1	Chapman, Meredith	2,000
1 February 1896	Loughborough	A	Athletic Ground	4–2	Finnerhan (2), Davies, Hill	2,000
10 February 1896	Burslem Port Vale	A	Athletic Ground	1–0	Davies	3,000
15 February 1896	Crewe Alexandra	H	Hyde Road	4–0	Rowan (2), Meredith, Finnerhan	4,000
17 February 1896	Burslem Port Vale	H	Hyde Road	1–0	Finnerhan	3,000
24 February 1896	Loughborough	H	Hyde Road	5–1	Morris (2), Davies, Meredith, Chapman	2,000
29 February 1896	Notts County	A	Trent Bridge	0–3		4,000
7 March 1896	Burton Swifts	H	Hyde Road	1–1	Robertson	9,000
14 March 1896	Lincoln City	H	Hyde Road	4–0	Robertson, Meredith, Morris, Finnerhan	9,000
21 March 1896	Newcastle United	A	St James' Park	1–4	Davies	12,000
3 April 1896	Liverpool	H	Hyde Road	1–1	Morris	30,000
4 April 1896	Leicester Fosse	A	Filbert Street	2–1	Meredith, Robson	4,000
8 April 1896	Notts County	H	Hyde Road	2–0	Meredith, Morris	6,000

=== Test matches ===
As Manchester City finished second in the league, they were entitled to play test matches to compete for promotion to the Football League's First Division. Though they played both teams bottom of the First Division for the 1895–86 season, they lost both matches on aggregate and thus failed in their promotion bid, remaining in the Second Division for the following season.

Date	Opponents	H / A	Venue	Result F – A	Scorers	Attendance
18 April 1896	West Bromwich Albion	H	Hyde Road	1–1	Rowan	6,000
20 April 1896	West Bromwich Albion	A	The Hawthorns	1–6	McBride	8,000
25 April 1896	Small Heath	H	Hyde Road	3–0	Meredith, Davies, Rowan	9,500
27 April 1896	Small Heath	A	Muntz Street	0–8		2,000

== Squad statistics ==
=== Appearances and goals ===
No.	Pos	Nat	Player	Total		Division 1		Test Matches	
No.	Pos	Nat	Player	Apps	Goals	Apps	Goals	Apps	Goals
	FW	(Canada) CAN	Walter Bowman	7	0	7	0	0	0
	MF	(England) ENG	Tommy Chapman	28	3	26	3	2	0
	DF	(Scotland) SCO	Hughie Clifford	4	1	4	1	0	0
	FW	(Wales) WAL	Joe Davies	13	5	11	4	2	1
	DF	(England) ENG	Charlie Ditchfield	5	0	2	0	3	0
	MF	(Scotland) SCO	Frank Dyer	1	0	1	0	0	0
	FW	(Scotland) SCO	Jock Espie	1	0	1	0	0	0
	FW	(England) ENG	Pat Finnerhan	34	9	30	9	4	0
	MF	(Scotland) SCO	Alec Gillies	5	0	3	0	2	0
	DF		James Harper	22	0	21	0	1	0
	FW	(Scotland) SCO	Bob Hill	10	4	9	4	1	0
	FW	(Scotland) SCO	Tommy Little	9	2	9	2	0	0
	MF	(Scotland) SCO	Willie Maley	1	0	1	0	0	0
	MF		George Mann	27	0	23	0	4	0
	MF	(Scotland) SCO	James McBride	29	1	25	0	4	1
	MF	(England) ENG	Arthur McCabe	1	0	1	0	0	0
	FW	(Scotland) SCO	Wally McReddie	11	3	11	3	0	0
	FW	(Wales) WAL	Billy Meredith	33	12	29	12	4	0
	FW	(Scotland) SCO	Bob Milarvie	1	0	1	0	0	0
	MF	(England) ENG	John Millar	4	0	2	0	2	0
	MF	(Scotland) SCO	Bobby Moffatt	2	0	2	0	0	0
	FW	(Scotland) SCO	Hugh Morris	20	10	16	9	4	1
	DF	(England) ENG	Tom Porteous	5	0	5	0	0	0
	DF	(England) ENG	Bert Read	1	0	1	0	0	0
	FW	(Scotland) SCO	Jimmie Robertson	3	2	3	2	0	0
	DF	(Scotland) SCO	David Robson	34	1	30	1	4	0
	FW	(Scotland) SCO	Sandy Rowan	24	12	21	11	3	1
	FW	(England) ENG	James Sharples	5	2	5	2	0	0
	GK	(England) ENG	Charlie Williams	34	0	30	0	4	0

=== Goals record ===
Rank	Nat.	Po.	Name	Division 1	Test Matches	Total
1	(Wales)	FW	Billy Meredith	12	1	13
1	(Scotland)	FW	Sandy Rowan	11	2	13
3	(England)	FW	Pat Finnerhan	9	0	9
3	(Wales)	FW	Hugh Morris	9	0	9
5	(Wales)	FW	Joe Davis	4	1	5
6	(Scotland)	FW	Bob Hill	4	0	4
7	(England)	MF	Tommy Chapman	3	0	3
7	(Scotland)	FW	Wally McReddie	3	0	3
9	(Scotland)	FW	Tommy Little	2	0	2
9	(Scotland)	FW	Jimmie Robertson	2	0	2
9	(England)	FW	James Sharples	2	0	2
12	(Scotland)	MF	James McBride	0	1	1
12	(Scotland)	DF	Hughie Clifford	1	0	1
12	(Scotland)	DF	David Robson	1	0	1
Total				63	5	68

Squad Statistics (abandoned matches)

=== Appearances and goals (abandoned matches) ===
No.	Pos	Nat	Player	Total		Abandoned	
No.	Pos	Nat	Player	Apps	Goals	Apps	Goals
	FW	(Canada) CAN	Walter Bowman	0	0	0	0
	MF	(England) ENG	Tommy Chapman	2	0	2	0
	FW	(Wales) WAL	Joe Davies	1	0	1	0
	FW	(England) ENG	Pat Finnerhan	2	0	2	0
	FW	(Scotland) SCO	Bob Hill	2	0	2	0
	MF		George Mann	2	0	2	0
	MF	(Scotland) SCO	James McBride	2	1	2	1
	FW	(Wales) WAL	Billy Meredith	1	0	1	0
	FW	(Scotland) SCO	Hugh Morris	2	0	2	0
	DF	(England) ENG	Bert Read	2	0	2	0
	FW	(Scotland) SCO	Jimmie Robertson	0	0	0	0
	DF	(Scotland) SCO	David Robson	2	0	2	0
	FW	(Scotland) SCO	Sandy Rowan	2	0	2	0
	GK	(England) ENG	Charlie Williams	2	0	2	0

=== Goals record (abandoned matches) ===
Rank	Nat.	Po.	Name	Abandoned	Total
1	(Scotland)	MF	James McBride	1	1
Total				1	1

== See also ==
- Manchester City F.C. seasons
