= 1896–97 Manchester City F.C. season =

English football club season

Manchester City F.C.
1896–97 season
- Manager: Sam Ormerod
- Football League: 6th
- FA Cup: First round
- Top goalscorer: League: Meredith (10 goals); All: Meredith (10 goals)
- Highest home attendance: 20,000 vs Newton Heath (3 October 1896)
- Lowest home attendance: 1,000 vs Lincoln City (13 February 1897); 1,000 vs Leicester Fosse (12 April 1897)

The 1896–97 season was Manchester City F.C.'s sixth season of league football and fifth season in the Football League.

It was the first season during which Manchester City scored its one and only win against the Burton Wanderers F.C., in November 1896. In January 1897, centre-forward Billie Gillespie joined City from Lincoln City F.C., scoring the only goal in his debut against Darwen F.C. (1870).

== Football League Second Division ==
Pos	Team	Pld	W	D	L	GF	GA	GAv	Pts
4	Small Heath	30	16	5	9	69	47	1.468	37
5	Newcastle United	30	17	1	12	56	52	1.077	35
6	Manchester City	30	12	8	10	58	50	1.160	32
7	Gainsborough Trinity	30	12	7	11	50	47	1.064	31
8	Blackpool	30	13	5	12	59	56	1.054	31

Rules for classification: 1) Points; 2) Goal average; 3) Goals scored

=== Results summary ===
Overall								Home						Away					
Pld	W	D	L	GF	GA	GAv	Pts	W	D	L	GF	GA	Pts	W	D	L	GF	GA	Pts
30	12	8	10	58	50	1.16	32	5	5	5	25	27	15	7	3	5	33	23	17

Source: rsssf.com

=== Reports ===
Date	Opponents	H / A	Venue	Result F – A	Scorers	Attendance
5 September 1896	Woolwich Arsenal	H	Hyde Road	1 – 1	Finnerhan	8,000
12 September 1896	Gainsborough Trinity	H	Hyde Road	1 – 1	Sharples	4,000
19 September 1896	Darwen	H	Hyde Road	4 – 1	Mann (2), Ditchfield, Lewis	10,000
21 September 1896	Lincoln City	A	Sincil Bank	3 – 0	Finnerhan, Lewis, Sharples	3,000
26 September 1896	Blackpool	A	Athletic Grounds	2 – 2	Mann, Hill	5,000
3 October 1896	Newton Heath	H	Hyde Road	0 – 0		20,000
10 October 1896	Notts County	A	Trent Bridge	3 – 3	Meredith, Hill, Robinson	7,000
17 October 1896	Newcastle United	H	Hyde Road	1 – 2	Robinson	10,000
24 October 1896	Grimsby Town	H	Hyde Road	1 – 3	Sharples	3,000
31 October 1896	Notts County	H	Hyde Road	1 – 4	Meredith	12,000
7 November 1896	Blackpool	H	Hyde Road	4 – 2	Banner, Meredith, Sharples, Lewis	4,000
14 November 1896	Burton Swifts	A	Peel Croft	3 – 1	Tait (2), Gunn	4,000
23 November 1896	Walsall	H	Hyde Road	2 – 3	Finnerhan, Mann	3,000
28 November 1896	Burton Wanderers	H	Hyde Road	2 – 1	F. Williams, Gunn	2,000
19 December 1896	Grimsby Town	A	Abbey Park	3 – 1	Meredith, Gunn, F. Williams	12,000
25 December 1896	Newton Heath	A	Bank Street	1 – 2	Hill	18,000
26 December 1896	Burton Swifts	H	Hyde Road	0 – 5		6,000
1 January 1897	Small Heath	H	Hyde Road	3 – 0	Bannister, Gunn, Sharples	16,000
6 January 1897	Walsall	A	Hillary Street	5 – 0	Ray, Mann, Meredith, Lewis, Sharples	500
9 January 1897	Darwen	A	Barley Bank	1 – 3	Gillespie	1,000
6 February 1897	Newcastle United	A	St James' Park	0 – 3		4,000
13 February 1897	Lincoln City	H	Hyde Road	1 – 0	Gillespie	1,000
27 February 1897	Gainsborough Trinity	A	The Northolme	4 – 1	Gillespie, F. Williams (2), Meredith	9,000
6 March 1897	Burton Wanderers	A	Derby Turn	1 – 1	Read	3,000
13 March 1897	Leicester Fosse	A	Filbert Street	4 – 0	Holmes, Meredith, Gillespie, F. Williams	6,000
17 March 1897	Loughborough	A	Athletic Ground	0 – 2		2,000
12 April 1897	Leicester Fosse	H	Hyde Road	3 – 3	Meredith (2), ? (o.g.)	1,000
16 April 1897	Loughborough	H	Hyde Road	1 – 1	Foster	2,000
19 April 1897	Small Heath	A	Muntz Street	1 – 3	Meredith	500
28 April 1897	Woolwich Arsenal	A	Manor Ground	2 – 1	Hill (2)	2,000

== FA Cup ==
Date	Round	Opponents	H / A	Venue	Result F – A	Scorers	Attendance
30 January 1897	First round	Preston North End	A	Deepdale	0 – 6		6,000

== Squad statistics ==
=== Appearances and goals ===
No.	Pos	Nat	Player	Total		Division 2		FA Cup	
No.	Pos	Nat	Player	Apps	Goals	Apps	Goals	Apps	Goals
	DF	(England) ENG	Charlie Bannister	18	2	18	2	0	0
	DF	(Canada) CAN	Walter Bowman	2	0	2	0	0	0
	DF	(England) ENG	Charlie Ditchfield	10	1	10	1	0	0
	FW	(England) ENG	Pat Finnerhan	25	3	25	3	0	0
	MF		Henry Foster	7	1	6	1	1	0
	FW	(England) ENG	Billy Gillespie	11	4	11	4	0	0
	FW		John Gunn	22	4	21	4	1	0
	DF		James Harper	11	0	10	0	1	0
	MF	(England) ENG	Frank Hesham	2	0	2	0	0	0
	FW	(Scotland) SCO	Bob Hill	12	5	12	5	0	0
	DF	(England) ENG	Billy Holmes	13	1	12	1	1	0
	FW	(Wales) WAL	Billy Lewis	13	4	12	4	1	0
	DF		George Mann	19	5	18	5	1	0
	DF	(Scotland) SCO	James McBride	29	0	28	0	1	0
	MF		Tom McConnell	2	0	2	0	0	0
	MF	(Wales) WAL	Billy Meredith	28	10	27	10	1	0
	DF	(Scotland) SCO	Bobby Moffatt	11	0	11	0	0	0
	FW		William Paterson	1	0	1	0	0	0
	FW		Jim Platt	1	0	1	0	0	0
	DF	(England) ENG	Dick Ray	31	1	30	1	1	0
	DF	(England) ENG	Bert Read	8	1	8	1	0	0
	MF	(England) ENG	George Robinson	3	2	3	2	0	0
	FW	(England) ENG	Jimmy Sharples	11	6	10	6	1	0
	DF	(Scotland) SCO	David Tait	4	2	4	2	0	0
	MF		James Tonge	2	0	2	0	0	0
	MF	(England) ENG	William Townley	3	0	3	0	0	0
	GK	(England) ENG	Charlie Williams	31	0	30	0	1	0
	FW	(England) ENG	Fred Williams	11	5	11	5	0	0

=== Scorers ===
==== All ====
Scorer	Goals
(Wales) Billy Meredith	10
James Sharples	6
Robert Hill	5
George Mann	5
(England) Fred Williams	5
(England) Billie Gillespie	4
(England) John Gunn	4
(Wales) Billy Lewis	4
(England) Pat Finnerhan	3
Charlie Bannister	2
L. Robinson	2
David Tait	2
John Ditchfield	1
H. Foster	1
Billy Holmes	1
(England) Dick Ray	1
Thomas Read	1

==== League ====
Scorer	Goals
(Wales) Billy Meredith	10
James Sharples	6
Robert Hill	5
George Mann	5
(England) Fred Williams	5
(England) Billie Gillespie	4
(England) John Gunn	4
(Wales) Billy Lewis	4
(England) Pat Finnerhan	3
Charlie Bannister	2
L. Robinson	2
David Tait	2
John Ditchfield	1
H. Foster	1
Billy Holmes	1
(England) Dick Ray	1
Thomas Read	1

== See also ==
- Manchester City F.C. seasons
