= 1890–91 Newton Heath LYR F.C. season =

English football club season

Newton Heath LYR
1890–91 season
- Manager: A. H. Albut
- Stadium: North Road Ground
- Football Alliance: 9th
- FA Cup: Second round qualifying
- Lancashire Senior Cup: Second round
- Manchester Cup: Runners-up
- Top goalscorer: League: Bob Ramsay (7); All: Alf Farman (7); Bob Ramsay (7)
- Highest home attendance: 6,000 vs Darwen (6 September 1890)
- Lowest home attendance: 1,000 vs Small Heath (13 December 1890)
Home colours

The 1890–91 season was Newton Heath's second season in the Football Alliance; they finished in 9th position. The club also took part in the FA Cup, reaching the Second Qualifying Round; the Lancashire Senior Cup, in which they reached the second round; and the Manchester and District Challenge Cup, in which they finished as runners-up to Ardwick.

== Football Alliance ==
Date	Opponents	H / A	Result F–A	Scorers	Attendance
6 September 1890	Darwen	H	4–2	Farman, Evans, J. Doughty, Owen	6,000
13 September 1890	Grimsby Town	A	1–3	Stewart	3,000
20 September 1890	Nottingham Forest	H	1–1	J. Doughty	5,000
27 September 1890	Stoke	A	1–2	Milarvie	2,000
11 October 1890	Bootle	A	0–5		4,000
18 October 1890	Grimsby Town	H	3–1	Ramsay, Evans, Sharpe	2,500
1 November 1890	Crewe Alexandra	H	6–3	Farman, Stewart (2), Craig, Evans, Ramsay	4,000
8 November 1890	Walsall Town Swifts	A	1–2	Sharpe	3,000
22 November 1890	Nottingham Forest	A	2–8	Farman, Ramsay	2,000
29 November 1890	Sunderland Albion	H	1–5	Ramsay	2,000
13 December 1890	Small Heath	H	3–1	Sharpe, Milarvie, Speller (o.g.)	1,000
27 December 1890	Bootle	H	2–1	Stewart, Milarvie	5,000
5 January 1891	Stoke	H	0–1		3,000
10 January 1891	Birmingham St George's	A	1–6	Farman	1,000
17 January 1891	Walsall Town Swifts	H	3–3	Owen, Milarvie, Ramsay	1,500
24 January 1891	Sheffield Wednesday	A	2–1	Sharpe, Stewart	3,000
14 February 1891	Crewe Alexandra	A	1–0	Farman	3,000
21 February 1891	Sheffield Wednesday	H	1–1	Craig	4,000
7 March 1891	Small Heath	A	1–2	Sharpe	2,000
14 March 1891	Birmingham St George's	H	1–3	Sharpe	2,000
28 March 1891	Darwen	A	1–2	Ramsay	2,000
11 April 1891	Sunderland Albion	A	1–2	Ramsay	3,500

Pos	Team	Pld	W	D	L	GF	GA	GAv	Pts
7	Walsall Town Swifts	22	9	3	10	34	61	0.557	21
8	Crewe Alexandra	22	8	4	10	59	67	0.881	20
9	Newton Heath	22	7	3	12	37	55	0.673	17
10	Small Heath	22	7	2	13	58	66	0.879	16
11	Bootle	22	3	7	12	40	61	0.656	13

Rules for classification: 1) points; 2) goal average.

== FA Cup ==
Date	Round	Opponents	H / A	Result F–A	Scorers	Attendance
4 October 1890	First round qualifying	Higher Walton	H	2–0	Farman, Evans	3,000
25 October 1890	Second round qualifying	Bootle Reserves	A	0–1		3,000

== Lancashire Senior Cup ==
Date	Round	Opponents	H / A	Result F–A	Scorers	Attendance
7 February 1891	Round 1	Witton	A	4–3	Craig, Milarvie, unknown, unknown	
19 February 1891	Round 2	Preston North End	A	1–3	Farman	2,000

== Manchester Senior Cup ==
Date	Round	Opponents	H / A	Result F–A	Scorers	Attendance
14 February 1891	Round 3	Hurst	H	2–2	Jones (2)	500
21 March 1891	Semi-final	Stockport County	N	3–1	Stewart, Craig, Milarvie	5,000
18 April 1891	Final	Ardwick	N	0–1		10,000
