= 1893–94 Stoke F.C. season =

Stoke
1893–94 season
- Chairman: Mr S. Barker
- Manager: Arthur Reeves
- Stadium: Victoria Ground
- Football League First Division: 11th (29 Points)
- FA Cup: Second Round
- United Counties League: Group Stage
- Top goalscorer: League: Joe Schofield (15); All: Joe Schofield (18)
- Highest home attendance: 12,000 vs Sunderland (24 March 1894)
- Lowest home attendance: 2,500 vs Newton Heath (23 March 1894)
- Average home league attendance: 5,075
Home colours

The 1893–94 season was Stoke's fifth season in the Football League.

Stoke finished the season in 11th position after picking up 29 points of which 27 were claimed at the Victoria Ground. Indeed, Stoke's home form of 1893–94 was excellent with 13 wins from 15 but their away from was terrible as they failed to win any away game during the season. Stoke also competed in the short lived United Counties League which was won on goal average by West Bromwich Albion.

== Season review ==
=== League ===
In 1893–94 the Stoke side was broken up with Alf Underwood, Bill Rowley and Ted Evans all losing their first choice status. Eleventh place in the table was achieved, thanks in main to an excellent home record of 13 wins from 15. The only defeat in front of their own fans came shortly after Christmas when Wolverhampton Wanderers won 3–0 whilst eventual champions Aston Villa were held 3–3 in the other game. As their home form was good Stoke's away from was awful picking up just two points and conceded 62 goals on their travels. Indeed, from 1 April 1893 to 17 March 1895 not one away win was gained and by coincidence it was Sheffield Wednesday whom Stoke beat on each occasion at the start and at the end of that dismal run. There was tragedy during the season as young defender Jack Proctor fell ill with pneumonia and died at the age of 22.

Stoke also competed in the United Counties League this season which involved two groups of four teams playing each other twice and the winners of each group playing each other to win the title. Stoke finished 2nd in their group behind West Bromwich Albion on goal average. West Brom went on to lose to Derby County in the final. The tournament failed to get the supporters in through the gates and after just one season the United Counties League was scrapped.

=== FA Cup ===
Season 1893–94 also saw one of Stoke's best FA Cup displays since they entered the competition in 1883. Competing in gale-force winds, they knocked out Everton 1–0 with a Joe Schofield goal in the final minute of the match. The Stoke players were praised by watching reporters for making the match highly entertaining in difficult conditions. Alas they went out in the next round defeated by Sheffield Wednesday.

== Final league table ==
Pos	Team	Pld	W	D	L	GF	GA	GAv	Pts
9	Wolverhampton Wanderers	30	14	3	13	52	63	0.825	31
10	Sheffield United	30	13	5	12	47	61	0.770	31
11	Stoke	30	13	3	14	65	79	0.823	29
12	The Wednesday	30	9	8	13	48	57	0.842	26
13	Bolton Wanderers	30	10	4	16	38	52	0.731	24

Source: World Football
Rules for classification: 1) Points; 2) Goal average; 3) Goals scored

== Results ==
Stoke's score comes first

=== Legend ===
Win	Draw	Loss

=== Football League First Division ===
Match	Date	Opponent	Venue	Result	Attendance	Scorers
1	2 September 1893	Bolton Wanderers	A	1–4	5,000	Clare
2	9 September 1893	Nottingham Forest	H	2–1	6,000	Schofield, McReddie
3	11 September 1893	Aston Villa	A	1–5	8,000	Dickson
4	16 September 1893	Darwen	A	1–3	1,000	Schofield
5	23 September 1893	Derby County	H	3–1	5,000	McReddie (2), Robertson
6	30 September 1893	Burnley	A	0–4	7,000	
7	7 October 1893	The Wednesday	H	4–1	4,000	Naughton (2), Evans, Christie
8	14 October 1893	Sunderland	A	0–4	6,000	
9	16 October 1893	Aston Villa	H	3–3	4,000	Robertson (2), Evans
10	21 October 1893	Nottingham Forest	A	0–2	7,000	
11	28 October 1893	Blackburn Rovers	H	3–1	6,000	McReddie, Naughton, Sawers
12	4 November 1893	West Bromwich Albion	A	2–4	3,000	McReddie, Naughton
13	11 November 1893	Burnley	H	4–2	5,000	McReddie, Naughton, Schofield (2)
14	13 November 1893	Preston North End	H	2–1	7,000	Brodie, Sawers
15	25 November 1893	Wolverhampton Wanderers	A	2–4	7,000	Schofield, Sawers
16	2 December 1893	Darwen	H	3–1	7,000	Schofield (2), Evans
17	7 December 1893	The Wednesday	A	1–4	5,000	McReddie
18	16 December 1893	Sheffield United	H	5–0	5,000	Naughton (2), Robertson, Schofield, Sawers
19	23 December 1893	Derby County	A	2–5	7,000	Schofield, Dickson
20	25 December 1893	Preston North End	A	3–3	3,500	Dickson (2), Sawers
21	30 December 1893	Wolverhampton Wanderers	H	0–3	5,000	
22	13 January 1894	Bolton Wanderers	H	5–0	4,000	McReddie, Robertson, Clare, Naughton, Dickson
23	20 January 1894	West Bromwich Albion	H	3–1	3,000	Robertson (2), Dickson
24	3 February 1894	Sheffield United	A	3–3	8,000	Schofield, Naughton, McReddie
25	3 March 1894	Everton	H	3–1	7,000	Naughton (2), Robertson
26	23 March 1894	Newton Heath	A	2–6	2,500	Hood (o.g.), Dickson
27	24 March 1894	Sunderland	H	2–0	12,000	Schofield, Dickson
28	31 March 1894	Newton Heath	H	3–1	3,000	Schofield, Clare, McReddie
29	7 April 1894	Everton	A	2–6	10,000	Schofield (2)
30	14 April 1894	Blackburn Rovers	A	0–5	4,000	

=== FA Cup ===
Round	Date	Opponent	Venue	Result	Attendance	Scorers
R1	27 January 1894	Everton	H	1–0	14,000	Schofield
R2	10 February 1894	The Wednesday	A	0–1	17,000	

=== United Counties League ===
- Derby County won the other group and beat West Bromwich Albion in the final. The United Counties League was not deemed a success due to poor attendances and was scrapped after just one season.

Date	Opponent	Venue	Result	Attendance	Scorers
10 March 1894	West Bromwich Albion	A	0–5	1,000	
17 March 1894	Wolverhampton Wanderers	A	2–1	1,500	Heames, Dickson
19 March 1894	West Bromwich Albion	H	5–2	2,000	Dickson (2), McReddie, Schofield (2)
2 April 1894	Small Heath	A	0–3	2,000	
9 April 1894	Small Heath	H	2–1	1,500	Dickson (2)
16 April 1894	Wolverhampton Wanderers	H	3–0	2,000	Naughton, McReddie, Robertson

==== Table ====
Pos	Club	P	W	D	L	F	A	Pts
1	West Bromwich Albion	6	4	0	2	20	15	8
2	Stoke	6	4	0	2	12	12	8
3	Small Heath	6	2	1	3	14	14	5
4	Wolverhampton Wanderers	6	1	1	4	10	15	3

== Squad statistics ==
Pos.	Name	League		FA Cup		United Counties		Total	
Pos.	Name	Apps	Goals	Apps	Goals	Apps	Goals	Apps	Goals
GK	(England) Tom Cain	11	0	0	0	3	0	14	0
GK	(England) Arthur Evans	9	0	0	0	2	0	11	0
GK	(England) Bill Rowley	10	0	2	0	1	0	13	0
FB	(England) Tommy Clare	27	3	2	0	1	0	30	3
FB	(England) Jack Eccles	11	0	2	0	6	0	19	0
FB	(England) Arthur Foster	1	0	0	0	0	0	1	0
FB	(England) Lachie Thomson	2	0	0	0	0	0	2	0
FB	(England) Alf Underwood	1	0	0	0	0	0	1	0
HB	(Scotland) Davy Brodie	30	1	2	0	6	0	38	1
HB	(Scotland) Davy Christie	29	1	2	0	5	0	36	1
HB	(Scotland) Hughie Clifford	1	0	0	0	0	0	1	0
HB	(Scotland) Peter Dowds	17	0	2	0	5	0	24	0
HB	(England) Billy Draycott	1	0	0	0	0	0	1	0
HB	(Scotland) Samuel Meston	1	0	0	0	6	0	7	0
HB	(England) Jack Proctor	10	0	0	0	0	0	10	0
FW	(Scotland) Billy Dickson	29	8	2	0	6	5	36	13
FW	(England) Ted Evans	10	3	0	0	2	0	12	3
FW	(England) Billy Heames	1	0	0	0	3	1	4	1
FW	(Scotland) Wally McReddie	30	10	2	0	6	2	38	12
FW	(Scotland) Willie Naughton	28	10	1	0	6	1	35	11
FW	(Scotland) Jimmie Robertson	26	8	2	0	3	1	31	9
FW	(Scotland) Bill Sawers	17	5	1	0	1	0	19	5
FW	(England) Joe Schofield	28	15	2	1	4	2	34	18
–	Own goals	–	1	–	0	–	0	–	1
