= Robert Shaw (disambiguation) =

Robert Shaw (1927–1978) was an English actor.

Bob, Bobby, Robbie, Rob or Robert Shaw may also refer to:

== Academicians ==
- Robert Sidey Shaw (1871–1953), American president of Michigan State College of Agriculture
- Robert Shaw (physicist) (born 1946), American researcher in chaos theory

== Film, theater, and TV professionals ==
- Robert Shaw (1927–1978), English actor
- Bob Shaw (actor) (1915–2005), American star of 1946 serial Son of the Guardsman, a.k.a. Robert Shaw and Robert Gottschall
- Rob Shaw (filmmaker), American animator, director and videographer during 2000s, 2010s and 2020s
- Bob Shaw (production designer), American Emmy-winning art director during 2010s and 2020s

== Military men ==
- Robert Gould Shaw (1837–1863), American Civil War colonel in Union Army
- Robert Shaw (Royal Navy officer) (1900–1995), English cricketer who served in First and Second World War

== Music personalities ==
- Robert Shaw (blues musician) (1908–1985), American boogie-woogie pianist
- Robert Shaw (conductor) (1916-1999), American conductor, founder of Robert Shaw Chorale
- Robert Shaw (poet) (born 1933), British pioneer of poetry-and-jazz fusion

== Public officials ==
- Robert Shaw (bishop) (before 1470–1527), Scottish monk, prelate and diplomat
- Sir Robert Shaw, 1st Baronet (1774–1849), British Tory MP for Dublin City
- Robert Barkley Shaw (1839–1879), British explorer and diplomat in India
- Robert Shaw (Canadian politician) (1845–1882), Conservative member of Prince Edward Island Legislative Assembly
- Robert L. Shaw (1865–1930), Canadian Liberal member of Alberta Legislative assembly
- Robert Shaw (Ohio politician) (1904–1985), American state senator in Ohio, 1967–1972
- Robert Shaw (judge) (1907–1972), American federal judge in New Jersey
- Robert Fletcher Shaw (1910–2001), Canada's first deputy minister of the environment
- Robert Shaw (Illinois politician) (1937–2021), American alderman and county commissioner in Chicago

== Socialites ==
- Robert Gould Shaw II (1872–1930), American landowner and socialite in Massachusetts
- Robert Gould Shaw III (1898–1970), American-English son of Robert Gould Shaw II

== Sportsmen ==
=== Gridiron football ===
- Bob Shaw (end) (1921–2011), American player and coach in U.S. and Canada
- Bob Shaw (wide receiver) (born 1947), American player for New Orleans Saints
- Robert Shaw (American football) (born 1956), American center for Dallas Cowboys
- Bobby Shaw (born 1975), American wide receiver in NFL

=== Other sports ===
- Bob Shaw (footballer) (1870–after 1896), Scottish wing half for Darwen
- Robert Wilson Shaw (1913–1979), Scottish rugby union fly-half, wing and centre
- Bob Shaw (athlete) (born 1932), British Olympic hurdler from Wales
- Bob Shaw (baseball) (1933–2010), American right-handed pitcher
- Bob Shaw (golfer) (born 1944), Australian winner of Spanish Open
- Robert Shaw (footballer) (born 1955), Australian rules defender
- Robbie Shaw (born 1983), English rugby union scrum-half who played in U.S.
- Robert Shaw (wheelchair tennis) (born 1989), Canadian Parapan American Games champion in 2019

== Writers ==
- Robert J. Shaw (1917–1996), American television writer
- Bob Shaw (1931–1996), Irish science fiction writer
- Robert Shaw (business writer) (born 1950), English author on marketing
