= T. Craig =

English footballer

Personal information
- Position: Forward

Senior career*
Years	Team	Apps	(Gls)
1889–1891	Newton Heath	25	(5)
- * Club domestic league appearances and goals

T. Craig (dates unknown) was a footballer who played as a forward for Newton Heath LYR in the late 1880s and early 1890s.

== Career ==
Craig made his debut playing inside right in a 5–0 friendly win over Manchester Welsh at North Road on 29 April 1889. He made one more appearance before the end of the 1888–89 season, in another friendly at home to Darwen on 25 May 1889, this time playing at left half in a 3–2 win. After a spell away from the club, he returned in December 1889, appearing at inside right in several friendlies, before filling the same role in the club's 1889–90 FA Cup first round tie away to cup holders Preston North End on 18 January 1890; he scored Newton Heath's only goal – the opener – in a 6–1 defeat.

He made his Football Alliance debut the following week in a 2–0 away defeat to Sunderland Albion, then made another appearance in a 7–0 defeat away to Grimsby Town on 8 February. On 15 March, he filled in at right half for the absent Roger Doughty, before an extended run on the left side of the forward line that lasted until the end of the season, filling in first for George Owen for seven games at inside left, then for Edgar Wilson for one game at outside left. During that run of eight games, he scored three goals, the first in a 9–1 home win over Small Heath on 7 April, then in a 2–1 home win over Birmingham St George's on 19 April and a 2–1 home defeat to Sheffield Wednesday on 26 April. He would have had a further two goals from a home match against Grimsby Town on 4 January, but the match was ordered to be replayed due to the poor state of the pitch. On 3 May, he played at inside right in the final of the Manchester Cup against Royton at Brooke's Bar, and scored a hat-trick as Newton Heath won 5–2, their fourth Manchester Cup title.

After missing out on the first two months of the 1890–91 season, Craig made his return at inside left in a 1–0 defeat to Bootle in the second qualifying round of the 1890–91 FA Cup after both sides agreed to use their reserve teams. The following week, he filled in at left-half and scored in a 6–3 Football Alliance win at home to Crewe Alexandra, after both Jack Owen and Jack Doughty were ruled out. The following week, in a 2–1 defeat away to Walsall Town Swifts, Bob Milarvie took over at left-half and Craig took Milarvie's place at outside left. After missing the next two games, he returned to the team for the remainder of the Alliance season, playing mostly at centre-forward in the absence of George Evans, though he played one game at left-half at home to Small Heath on 13 December 1890 and at inside right against Stoke on 5 January 1891. He scored one more goal in the Alliance in 1890–91, Newton Heath's only goal in a 1–1 draw at home to Sheffield Wednesday on 21 February 1891. Craig also played in both of Newton Heath's Lancashire Senior Cup matches that season, scoring in the 4–3 win over Witton in the first round on 7 February 1891, before a 3–1 defeat to Preston North End after extra time in the second round. He also played in both the semi-final and the final of the Manchester Senior Cup, scoring in the 3–1 win over Stockport County in the semi-final on 21 March 1891. He left the club at the end of the 1890–91 season.
