= Matt Reilly =

Matt Reilly may refer to:

- Matthew Reilly (born 1974), Australian action thriller writer
- Matt Reilly (footballer) (1874–1954), Irish international goalkeeper
