= Bernard Lee (disambiguation) =

Bernard Lee (1908–1981) was an English actor.

Bernard Lee may also refer to:

- Barney Lee (Bernard James Lee, 1873-1944), Scottish footballer
- Bernard Lee (activist) (1935-1991), member of the Southern Christian Leadership Conference (SCLC) during the 1960s Civil Rights Movement
- Bernard Lee (poker player) (born 1970), American poker player

== See also ==
- Bernard Warburton-Lee (1895–1940), Welsh recipient of the Victoria Cross
