= Tom Cain =

Tom Cain may refer to:

- Tom Cain (author) (born 1959), pen-name of the English author and journalist, Diana Thomas.
- Tom Cain (footballer) (1874–1897), English association footballer
- Tom Cain (tennis) (born 1958), American professional tennis player
