= Bob Milarvie =

Scottish footballer

Personal information
- Full name: Robert Milarvie
- Date of birth: 1864
- Place of birth: Pollokshields, Glasgow, Scotland
- Date of death: 30 November 1912 (age 47-48)
- Place of death: Gorton, Manchester, England
- Position: Forward

Youth career
- Pollokshield

Senior career*
Years	Team	Apps	(Gls)
- Hibernian
1888–1889	Stoke	15	(5)
1889	Burslem Port Vale	0	(0)
1889–1890	Derby County	14	(4)
1890–1891	Newton Heath	22	(4)
1891–1896	Ardwick	69	(12)
1896–1897	Ashton North End		
Total		120	(25)
- * Club domestic league appearances and goals

Robert Milarvie (1864 – 30 November 1912) was a Scottish footballer who played for Hibernian, Stoke, Burslem Port Vale, Derby County, Newton Heath, Ardwick / Manchester City, and Ashton North End.

== Career ==
Milarvie played for Pollokshield and Hibernian before moving south to join Stoke, where he played in the first season of the Football League. On his debut, he claimed a goal and two assists in a 3-0 win over Notts County on 24 November 1888. He scored five goals in 15 matches for a struggling Stoke side who finished bottom of the table. He moved on to nearby Burslem Port Vale in the summer of 1889. He made his Vale debut in a 1–1 friendly match against Halliwell at the Athletic Ground on 2 September 1889, but his club were censured by the Football Association for fielding him as he had also signed for Derby County, with County then winning the fight for his services. He was initially suspended for the season, before the ban was shortened after he explained he was a Catholic and had been influenced by Vale's Catholic representatives. He spent the 1889–90 season with Derby, scoring on his debut against West Bromwich Albion, the first of four goals in 14 appearances.

He left Derby in 1890 to sign with Newton Heath following a trial spell. He also worked as a cotton yarn dyer. He played four games for the club in the Football Alliance before moving on to neighbours Ardwick the following year. He played 19 Alliance league games in 1891–92, the final year of the league's existence. The club were then elected into the Football League Second Division, and Milarvie made 19 appearances in 1892–93. He played 23 games in 1893–94, but then lost his first-team place to the new signings of Billy Meredith, Wally McReddie and Pat Finnerhan. Ardwick changed their name to Manchester City in 1894–95, and Milarvie left the club after the 1895–96 campaign to join Lancashire League club Ashton North End. After retirement, he ran a pub in Manchester, dying on 30 November 1912.

== Career statistics ==
Appearances and goals by club, season and competition
Club	Season	League			FA Cup		Total	
Club	Season	Division	Apps	Goals	Apps	Goals	Apps	Goals
Stoke	1888–89	Football League	15	5	0	0	15	5
Burslem Port Vale	1889–90	–	0	0	0	0	0	0
Derby County	1889–90	Football League	14	4	0	0	14	4
Newton Heath	1890–91	Football Alliance	22	4	1	0	23	4
Ardwick	1891–92	Football Alliance	19	3	1	0	20	3
Ardwick	1892–93	Second Division	17	2	2	1	19	3
Ardwick	1893–94	Second Division	22	4	1	0	23	4
Ardwick	1894–95	Second Division	10	3	0	0	10	3
Ardwick	1895–96	Second Division	1	0	0	0	1	0
Ardwick	Total		69	12	4	1	73	13
Career total			120	25	5	1	125	26
