= RobotDNA =

RobotDNA is an animation studio founded in 1987 as Garner MacLennan Design (GMD). It initially produced digital design, animation and visual effects for television. Achievements include BDA and Promax awards for broadcast design and commercials such as a CLIO Award-winning Dr Pepper spot. It later engaged in interactive database marketing, digital television, WebTV, broadband communications and digital applications for film and television. GMD was re-structured as robotDNA in 2004.

== Work ==
- Arena "Network IDs" (1996)
- SF "Network Launch" (1998)
- SheTV "Network Launch" (1998)
- Nickelodeon USA "Relaunch" (1999)
- Disney Channel "Merry Christmas" (2000)
- Farscape (special effects) (2000)
- Nickelodeon UK "Nicktrition" (2005)

== See also ==
- List of film production companies
- List of television production companies
