= Kimmi Chex =

American television sports analyst

Kimberly Chexnayder or Kimmi Chex is an American personality on the NFL Network co-hosting NFL Total Access. She also has appeared on NFL Fantasy Live among other programs on the network. She was the youngest talent to be hired by the network. Chex was recognized as part of the 2022 Forbes 30 Under 30 class, The Athletic's 40 Under 40: Rising Stars Shaping the Direction of the NFL and Front Office Sports 25 Under 25.

== Early life and college ==
A native of Kansas City, Missouri, She attended the Paseo Academy of Fine and Performing Arts her last two years of high school and majored in broadcast journalism and television production during her time there. After winning an art competition her sophomore year of high school, the University of Iowa offered her a full scholarship to a weeklong summer art program on campus. A few years later she would attend there for college. During her time there, she worked in the Office of Admissions and she and others created with one of her favorites being a series called Between the Tigerhawks. Chex's senior year at Iowa was bookended by being named Homecoming queen in the fall and giving an address at the College of Liberal Arts and Sciences commencement that spring. She would graduate from Iowa with honors in 2018 with a BA in journalism and mass communication and a certificate in critical cultural competence. She was a member of the school's Chi Omega sorority chapter.

== Career ==
As a Senior, Chex was given an opportunity to work the Ohio State-Iowa game as a production assistant for ESPN. She was offered a job for the rest of the season but turned them down to finish school. She did work as a production assistant for ESPN hosting the Heisman Awards. Chex joined the NFL in 2018 as a participant in the League's Junior Rotational Program as a business analyst at the NFL's New York Headquarters. While in the program, she worked across International Media & Business Development, Fan Centric Database Marketing, Event Revenue & Strategy and Digital Media before joining the NFL Network as a full-time host in 2020. In September 2023, She was named co-host for the Network's flagship show NFL Total Access.

== Personal life ==
She met Jason White, an executive at MTV through a friend in June 2020 and were married in December 2021. They have a daughter.
