= Arthur Evans (footballer, born 1868) =

English footballer

Personal information
- Full name: Arthur W. Evans
- Date of birth: 1868
- Place of birth: Stoke-upon-Trent, England
- Position: Goalkeeper

Senior career*
Years	Team	Apps	(Gls)
1893–1894	Stoke	9	(0)
1894	Barlaston Saints		
- * Club domestic league appearances and goals

Arthur W. Evans (born 1868) was an English footballer who played in the Football League for Stoke.

== Career ==
Evans was born in Stoke-upon-Trent and played for Stoke where he made nine appearances in the absence of first choice goalkeeper Bill Rowley. He was released once Tom Cain signed for Stoke. He later played for Barlaston Saints.

== Career statistics ==
Club	Season	League			FA Cup		UCL		Total	
Club	Season	Division	Apps	Goals	Apps	Goals	Apps	Goals	Apps	Goals
Stoke	1893–94	First Division	9	0	0	0	2	0	11	0
Career Total			9	0	0	0	2	0	11	0
