= Accountable =

Accountability is a state of being called to account.

Accountable may also refer to:

- Accountable (software), an accounting and tax software
- Accountable autonomy, a design of administrative/democratic organisation
- Accountable marketing, a term referring to data management
- Accountable care system, a system for healthcare funding
