= 1894–95 United Counties League =

1895 United Counties League
Tournament details
- Country: England
- Teams: 6

The 1895 United Counties League was a league based competition between six East Midlands and Sheffield based clubs. The league was not finished as clubs failed to complete their fixtures.

== Table ==
This is the state of the table when the competition folded.

Pos	Team	Pld	W	D	L	GF	GA	GD	Pts
1	Nottingham Forest	8	5	1	2	16	7	+9	11
2	Derby County	5	3	1	1	14	9	+5	7
3	Sheffield Wednesday	4	2	2	0	8	3	+5	6
4	Sheffield United	6	2	2	2	11	14	−3	6
5	Leicester Fosse	7	2	2	3	10	14	−4	6
6	Notts County	6	0	0	6	3	15	−12	0

Updated to match(es) played on unknown. Source:

== Results ==
Home \ Away	DBC	FOR	LCF	NTC	SHU	SHW
Derby County		3–0				
Nottingham Forest	2–0		3–0	1–0	0–1	
Leicester Fosse		1–1				
Notts County		0–3				
Sheffield United	4–5	2–6	3–2			0–0
Sheffield Wednesday					1–1	

Updated to match(es) played on unknown. Source:
Legend: Blue = home team win; Yellow = draw; Red = away team win.
