= William Sharpe (footballer) =

English footballer

William Sharpe was an English footballer. His regular position was as a forward. He played for Newton Heath from 1891 to 1892.
