= Peter Dowds =

Scottish footballer

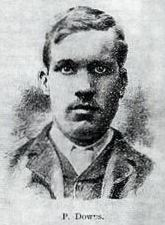
- Portrait of Dowds in 1892

Personal information
- Full name: Peter Dowds
- Date of birth: 24 August 1871
- Place of birth: Johnstone, Scotland
- Date of death: 3 September 1895 (aged 24)
- Place of death: Johnstone, Scotland
- Position: Left half

Senior career*
| Years | Team | Apps | (Gls) |
| 1889–1892 | Celtic | 37 | (16) |
| 1892–1893 | Aston Villa | 20 | (3) |
| 1893–1894 | Stoke | 17 | (0) |
| 1894–1895 | Celtic | 3 | (0) |
| Total | | 77 | (19) |

International career
| 1892 | Scotland | 1 | (0) |
- * Club domestic league appearances and goals

Peter Dowds (24 August 1871 – 2 September 1895) was a Scottish footballer, who played in the Football League for Aston Villa and Stoke.

== Career ==
Dowds (name spelled Douds in some documentation) was born in Johnstone and joined Celtic in 1889. He began his career as a forward and scored 21 goals in 1890–91 as Celtic finished the inaugural Scottish League season in 3rd place behind Dumbarton and Rangers. He moved to left-half for the 1891–92 campaign as Celtic finished in 2nd place, again behind Dumbarton, and won the Scottish Cup.

He was tempted to move into English football with Aston Villa in the summer of 1892 and he played 20 times in 1892–93 scoring three goals as Villa finished fourth. He then moved on to Stoke where he spent the 1893–94 season playing 19 times as Stoke ended in up in 11th place. He made a return to Celtic for the 1894–95 campaign however he fell ill with tuberculosis and died on 2 September 1895 at the age of just 24.

== Career statistics ==
=== Club ===
Appearances and goals by club, season and competition
| Club | Season | League | | | FA Cup | | Glasgow Cup | | Total | |
| Club | Season | Division | Apps | Goals | Apps | Goals | Apps | Goals | Apps | Goals |
|---|---|---|---|---|---|---|---|---|---|---|
| Celtic | 1889–90 | — | — | | 2 | 0 | 3 | 2 | 5 | 2 |
| Celtic | 1890–91 | Scottish Football League | 18 | 15 | 7 | 2 | 5 | 4 | 30 | 21 |
| Celtic | 1891–92 | Scottish Football League | 19 | 1 | 5 | 1 | 4 | 0 | 28 | 2 |
| Celtic | Total | | 37 | 16 | 14 | 3 | 11 | 6 | 62 | 25 |
| Aston Villa | 1892–93 | First Division | 20 | 3 | 0 | 0 | — | | 20 | 3 |
| Stoke | 1893–94 | First Division | 17 | 0 | 2 | 0 | — | | 19 | 0 |
| Celtic | 1894–95 | Scottish Division One | 3 | 0 | 0 | 0 | 1 | 0 | 4 | 0 |
| Career total | | | 77 | 19 | 16 | 3 | 12 | 6 | 105 | 28 |

=== International ===
| National team | Year | Apps | Goals |
|---|---|---|---|
| Scotland | 1892 | 1 | 0 |
| Total | | 1 | 0 |
