= The Chuckery =

Cricket and football ground in England

- Interactive map of The Chuckery
- Location: Walsall, England
- Coordinates: 52.5810°N 1.9669°W
- Surface: Grass
- Record attendance: 4,000

Tenants
- Walsall Swifts; Walsall Town; Walsall Town Swifts

The Chuckery was a cricket and football ground in the Chuckery area of Walsall, England. It was the home ground of the Walsall Swifts and Walsall Town football clubs until they merged in 1888, after which it was used by the new Walsall Town Swifts club.

== History ==
The Chuckery was located to the east of Walsall town centre, and had several different pitches which were used by Walsall Swifts and Walsall Town. When the two clubs merged in 1888, they continued playing at the Chuckery on the Town pitch. The Town pitch was chosen as it was located closer to the cricket pavilion, the only facility at the ground.

In 1892 Walsall Town Swifts were elected to the Football League, and the first League match at the ground was played on 3 September 1892, with Walsall losing 2–1 to Darwen in front of 4,000 spectators, also the highest League crowd recorded at the ground. Following complaints from local residents, the club left the ground to move to West Bromwich Road at the end of the 1892–93 season. However, the first two matches of the 1893–94 season were played at the Oval in Wednesbury as the new ground was not yet ready.

The final League match at the Chuckery was played on 15 April 1893, with 2,000 spectators seeing a 1–1 draw with Sheffield United. The site was later used to build housing.
