= The Oval (Wednesbury) =

Sports venue in Wednesbury, England

- Location: Wednesbury, England
- Coordinates: 52.5626°N 2.0007°W
- Surface: Grass

Tenants
- Wednesbury Old Athletic

The Oval was a cricket and football ground in Wednesbury, England. It was the home ground of Wednesbury Old Athletic, and also hosted two Walsall matches at the start of the 1893–94 season.

== History ==
The ground was located to the north-west of Wednesbury town centre, and featured a pavilion located close to St Paul's road, which ran along the northern boundary. At the end of the 1892–93 season Walsall left the Chuckery to move to West Bromwich Road. However, the new ground was not ready at the start of the 1893–94 season, so the club played two matches at the Oval. The first on 2 September 1893 saw Walsall lose 3–1 to Small Heath, whilst the second match was played on 9 September, with Walsall losing 5–0 to Burslem Port Vale. Despite it being a temporary home, the 5,000 spectators present at the Small Heath game was higher than the club's highest League attendances at either the Chuckery or West Bromwich Road.

The ground is now an open sports field, with Walsall's modern Bescot Stadium located a few hundred metres away on the other side of the M6 motorway.
