= Joseph Nash (footballer) =

English footballer (1869–after 1922)

Joseph Henry Nash
Personal information
- Date of birth: 1869
- Place of birth: Uxbridge, England
- Height: 5 ft 9 in (1.75 m)
- Position: Wing half

Senior career*
| Years | Team | Apps | (Gls) |
- Uxbridge
| 1890–1893 | Burnley | 5 | (0) |
| 1893–1894 | Nelson | | |
| 1894–1895 | Manchester City | 17 | (1) |
| 1895–1896 | Nelson | | |
- * Club domestic league appearances and goals

Joseph Nash (1869 – after 1922) was an English professional footballer who played as a wing half or centre half in the Football League for Burnley and Manchester City. He began his career with his home-town club, Uxbridge, and spent two spells with Lancashire League club Nelson.

== Personal life ==
Nash was born in Uxbridge, Middlesex, in 1869. The 1891 Census finds him living in lodgings in Burnley, described as a "painter & paperhanger, also professional football player". Later that year, he married his landlady's daughter, Kate Davison; the couple honeymooned in Blackpool. By the time of the 1911 Census, they had five children ranging in age from 18 down to 2, Nash was still hanging wallpaper in Burnley and his wife and two eldest daughters were working in the cotton mills.

Despite being in his mid-forties when the First World War began, Nash joined up, served as a sergeant in the 3rd Middlesex Regiment on the Western Front, and later served in India, before returning to his former trade.

== Football career ==
Nash played at centre forward for Uxbridge, and played representative football for West Middlesex Association. A team-mate, Tom White, signed for Football League club Burnley at the end of the 1888–89 season, and Nash soon followed.

White was a regular in the Burnley side in his first season, but Nash was not. He established himself in their reserve team, at an unaccustomed centre-half position, but did not make his first-team debut until 8 November 1890, standing in at right half for the injured Bill McFettridge away at Aston Villa. The match was drawn, 4–4, and according to the Athletic News, "Nash had none the worst of his repeated encounters with [England international winger] Dennis Hodgetts". He had a run of games at centre half in January and February 1891, but spent the next two and a half seasons with the reserves. He made one last appearance for the first team in December 1892, and was not offered a new contract at the end of that season. A feature some 30 years later in the Burnley Express remembers him "rendering good service" to Burnley over several years as "one of the most athletic players of the period".

Nash spent the 1893–94 season with Nelson of the Lancashire League, where he played not only as a half-back but also "distinguished himself" at full back. However, he was keen to return to League football. A proposed move to Woolwich Arsenal came to nothing because that club were reluctant to pay a fee, and in June 1894, he signed for Football League Second Division club Manchester City. He was named captain for the opening match of the new season, and played regularly until losing his place following the arrival of Jim McBride from Liverpool. He was reported to have been one of several players with Manchester City connections who had signed up for the exodus to the Baltimore Orioles of the nascent but short-lived American League of Professional Football, but he did not go. Those who did were suspended on their return. He numbered among his 17 matches the first Manchester derby played in the Football League, an 8–0 loss away to Burton Wanderers that remains City's joint-widest losing margin in league matches, and an 11–3 win at home to Lincoln City, in which he scored his only league goal, that remains City's record league win.

Rumours in October 1895 of Nash's imminent return to Uxbridge were denied by the player himself, who told the Buckinghamshire Advertiser reporter that he was negotiating with Burnley, but the fee required by Manchester City proved too steep, and he rejoined Nelson instead. He went straight into the team for a win against Halliwell Rovers that took Nelson to the top of the table, but was released at his own request four months later because he was "anxious to take part in more engagements than he has been permitted to with the Nelson team". According to a letter published in the Burnley newspapers in March 1897, Nash was spotted watching Burnley's reserves playing at Turf Moor, and asked why he was no longer playing. He is reported to have replied that he had offered his services to Burnley, informed them that Manchester City had promised him a free transfer if he found himself another Football League Club, and expressed a willingness to play on trial at no cost, but the committee had "given him no decided answer".
