= William Dickson (footballer, born 1866) =

Scottish footballer (1866–1910)

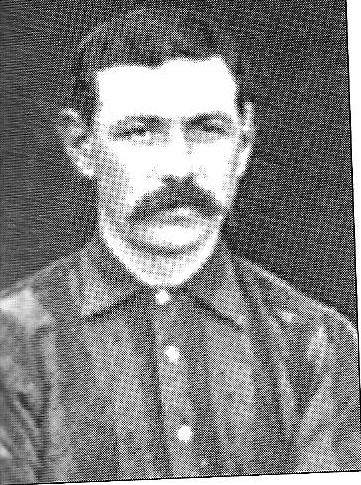

Personal information
- Full name: William Alexander Dickson
- Date of birth: 27 August 1866
- Place of birth: Crail, Fife, Scotland
- Date of death: 1 June 1910 (aged 43)
- Place of death: Stoke-upon-Trent, England
- Position: Forward

Senior career*
| Years | Team | Apps | (Gls) |
| 1886–1888 | Dundee Strathmore | | |
| 1888–1889 | Sunderland | | |
| 1889–1891 | Aston Villa | 58 | (32) |
| 1892–1896 | Stoke | 119 | (40) |
| Total | | 177 | (72) |

International career
| 1888 | Scotland | 1 | (4) |
- * Club domestic league appearances and goals

William Alexander Dickson (27 August 1866 – 1 June 1910) was a Scottish footballer who played in the Football League for Aston Villa and Stoke and also the Scotland national team.

== Career ==
Dickson was born in Crail, Fife and played for Dundee club Strathmore before joining English club Sunderland. Sunderland had been unable to gain a place in the inaugural season of the Football League and played friendly matches in the 1888–89 season, Dickson scoring four goals in nine appearances.

He joined Football League side Aston Villa making his debut on 14 September 1889 in a 1-1 home draw against Notts County. He did well for the Birmingham-based club scoring 34 goals in 64 matches and earned an FA Cup runners-up medal in the 1892 FA Cup Final . He joined fellow Midlands based club Stoke in time for the 1892–93 season where he scored 11 goals as Stoke enjoyed their best season in the league up to that point. He scored 13 in 1893–94 including five in six in the short lived United Counties League. As well as playing up front Dickson also played at full-back and would often swap positions on a regular basis. He retired from playing football in 1896 after scoring 48 goals in 135 matches for the "Potters".

== Post-retirement ==
After his retirement Dickson remained in the Stoke area where he was engaged in the licensing business. He was mine host of the Prince of Wales Inn on Liverpool Street. Dickson went on to become a director of the club following financial difficulties in 1908 after it was liquidated and in danger of disappearing completely. However, local feeling was roused at the eleventh hour and monies were raised by 12 local businessmen and a new board was formed, of which Dickson was a member.

Dickson was in Dundee in March 1910 for the silver wedding celebrations of his brother-in-law John Robertson. It was observed that he was not looking at all well and he was practically confined to his house after returning to Stoke. He died of Bright's disease on 1 June 1910 and left a widow and six children. Dickson left £2,092 to his widow Jessie when he died.

== International career ==
Dickson won his only Scotland cap while with Strathmore on 24 March 1888 where he scored four times in a 10–2 win over Ireland. Despite this, he was never selected again for his country. He is one of just two players to have scored four goals in their only Scotland appearance, the other being Charles Heggie two years previously.

== Career statistics ==
=== Club ===
Appearances and goals by club, season and competition
| Club | Season | League | | | FA Cup | | Other^{[A]} | | Total | |
| Club | Season | Division | Apps | Goals | Apps | Goals | Apps | Goals | Apps | Goals |
|---|---|---|---|---|---|---|---|---|---|---|
| Aston Villa | 1889–90 | The Football League | 20 | 8 | 2 | 1 | — | | 22 | 9 |
| Aston Villa | 1890–91 | The Football League | 18 | 10 | 0 | 0 | — | | 18 | 10 |
| Aston Villa | 1891–92 | The Football League | 20 | 15 | 4 | 0 | — | | 24 | 15 |
| Aston Villa | Total | | 58 | 33 | 6 | 1 | 0 | 0 | 64 | 34 |
| Stoke | 1892–93 | First Division | 30 | 11 | 1 | 0 | — | | 31 | 11 |
| Stoke | 1893–94 | First Division | 29 | 8 | 2 | 0 | 6 | 5 | 36 | 13 |
| Stoke | 1894–95 | First Division | 26 | 13 | 2 | 0 | 1 | 0 | 29 | 13 |
| Stoke | 1895–96 | First Division | 30 | 8 | 4 | 3 | — | | 34 | 11 |
| Stoke | 1896–97 | First Division | 4 | 0 | 0 | 0 | — | | 4 | 0 |
| Stoke | Total | | 119 | 40 | 9 | 3 | 7 | 5 | 135 | 48 |
| Career Total | | | 177 | 73 | 15 | 4 | 7 | 5 | 199 | 82 |

A. The "Other" column constitutes appearances and goals in the 1893–94 United Counties League and the 1894–95 Test Match.

=== International ===
| National team | Year | Apps | Goals |
|---|---|---|---|
| Scotland | 1888 | 1 | 4 |
| Total | | 1 | 4 |

== See also ==
- List of Scotland national football team hat-tricks
