= David Robson (footballer, born 1873) =

Scottish footballer

Personal information
- Date of birth: 21 March 1873
- Place of birth: Kirkmahoe, Scotland
- Date of death: 1926 (aged 52–53)
- Place of death: West Ham, England
- Position: Left back

Senior career*
| Years | Team | Apps | (Gls) |
| 1889–1892 | Ayr | | |
| 1892–1894 | Ardwick | 39 | (0) |
| 1894 | Wolverhampton Wanderers | 5 | (0) |
| 1894–1896 | Manchester City | 47 | (1) |
| 1896–1898 | Millwall Athletic | | |
| 1898–1899 | Wellingborough | | |
| 1899–1901 | Bristol City | | |
| 1901–1902 | Brentford | 29 | (0) |
- * Club domestic league appearances and goals

David J. Robson (21 March 1873 – 1926) was a Scottish professional footballer who played in the Football League for Manchester City and Wolverhampton Wanderers as a left back. He also played in the Southern League for Millwall Athletic, Bristol City and Brentford.

== Career statistics ==
Appearances and goals by club, season and competition
| Club | Season | League | | | National Cup | | Other | | Total | |
| Club | Season | Division | Apps | Goals | Apps | Goals | Apps | Goals | Apps | Goals |
|---|---|---|---|---|---|---|---|---|---|---|
| Ardwick | 1892–93 | Second Division | 22 | 0 | 2 | 0 | — | | 24 | 0 |
| Ardwick | 1893–94 | Second Division | 17 | 0 | 1 | 0 | — | | 18 | 0 |
| Ardwick | Total | | 39 | 0 | 3 | 0 | — | | 42 | 0 |
| Wolverhampton Wanderers | 1893–94 | First Division | 1 | 0 | — | | — | | 1 | 0 |
| Wolverhampton Wanderers | 1894–95 | First Division | 4 | 0 | 0 | 0 | — | | 4 | 0 |
| Wolverhampton Wanderers | Total | | 5 | 0 | 0 | 0 | — | | 5 | 0 |
| Manchester City | 1894–95 | Second Division | 17 | 0 | — | | — | | 17 | 0 |
| Manchester City | 1895–96 | Second Division | 30 | 1 | — | | 4 (Note: Appearances in Football League test match) | 0 | 34 | 1 |
| Manchester City | Ardwick/Manchester City total | | 86 | 1 | 3 | 0 | 4 | 0 | 93 | 1 |
| Brentford | 1901–02 | Southern League First Division | 29 | 0 | 3 | 0 | 1 (Note: Appearance in Southern League test match) | 0 | 33 | 0 |
| Career total | | | 120 | 1 | 3 | 0 | 5 | 0 | 128 | 1 |
