= Drip marketing =

Communication strategy

Drip marketing is a communication strategy that sends, or "drips", a pre-written set of messages to customers or prospects over time. These messages often take the form of email marketing, although other media can also be used. Drip marketing is distinct from other database marketing in two ways: (1) the timing of the messages follows a predetermined course; (2) the messages are dripped in a series applicable to a specific behavior or status of the recipient. It is also typically automated.

== Media ==
Email. The most commonly used form of drip marketing is email marketing, due to the low cost associated with sending multiple messages over time. Email drip marketing is often used in conjunction with a form in a method called an autoresponder.

Direct mail. Although more costly, direct mail software has been developed that enables drip marketing techniques using standard postal mail. This technology relies on digital printing, where low-volume print runs are cost justifiable, and the variable data can be merged to personalize each drip message.

Social media. The principles of drip marketing have been applied to many social media marketing tools to schedule a series of updates.

== Lead generation ==
Drip marketing can be used as a function of the lead generation and qualification process. Specifically, drip marketing constitutes an automated follow-up method that can augment or replace personal lead follow-up, invented in 1992 by Bill Persteiner and Jim Cecil, also known as Action Plans, and first introduced in software called WinSales. Often called autoresponders, new leads are automatically enrolled in a drip marketing campaign with messaging relevant to the call-to-action from which the lead came. This is also known as lead nurturing.

Advantages include automation and efficiency, as well as the continued ability for direct response. Intelligent e-commerce sites have integrated this form of drip campaign with un-purchased shopping carts. The continued messaging is relevant to the contents that the shopper stopped short of purchasing, and continues to include direct response actions (i.e. buy now).

Disadvantages include the impersonal manner of follow-up. If not augmented with a traditional and personal follow-up method, this automated follow-up has a lower response rate than does personal sales. The lowered response rate is often justified by the volume and efficiency with which leads can be generated and converted.

== Sales process ==
Drip marketing is popularly applied as a sales tool, particularly in long sales cycles (big-ticket items or enterprise-level sales). Where persistent follow-up can become a deterrent to closing the sale, methods with drip marketing offer the ability to remain top-of-mind, and even prompt action, without jeopardizing the relationship.

== Etymology ==
The phrase "drip marketing" is said to be derived from "drip irrigation", an agriculture/gardening technique in which small amounts of water are fed to plants over long periods of time.
