= Arthur Foster (footballer, born 1869) =

English footballer

Personal information
- Full name: Arthur Foster
- Date of birth: 1869
- Place of birth: Stoke-upon-Trent, England
- Position: Full back

Senior career*
Years	Team	Apps	(Gls)
1892	Hanley Town		
1893–1895	Stoke	7	(0)
1895	Oswestry Town		
- * Club domestic league appearances and goals

Arthur Foster (born 1869) was an English footballer who played in the Football League for Stoke.

== Career ==
Foster was born in Stoke-upon-Trent and played amateur football with Hanley Town prior to joining Stoke in 1893. He struggled to establish himself in the first team and left for border club Oswestry Town after making only seven appearances.

== Career statistics ==
Club	Season	League			FA Cup		Total	
Club	Season	Division	Apps	Goals	Apps	Goals	Apps	Goals
Stoke	1893–94	First Division	1	0	0	0	1	0
Stoke	1894–95	First Division	6	0	0	0	6	0
Career Total			7	0	0	0	7	0
