= Alf Underwood =

English footballer

Personal information
- Full name: Alfred Underwood
- Date of birth: 1869
- Place of birth: Hanley, England
- Date of death: 8 October 1928 (aged 59)
- Place of death: Stoke-on-Trent, England
- Height: 6 ft 0 in (1.83 m)
- Position: Full back

Youth career
- 1884–1885: Hanley Tabernacle
- 1885–1887: Etruria

Senior career*
Years	Team	Apps	(Gls)
1887–1893	Stoke	115	(0)

International career
1891–1892	England	2	(0)
- * Club domestic league appearances and goals

Alfred Underwood (April 1869 – 8 October 1928) was an English footballer who played 130 times for Stoke in the 1880s and 1890s.

== Early and personal life ==
Alfred Underwood was born in April 1869, with the birth registered in Newcastle-under-Lyme. He was the youngest of six children to William and Louisa (née Fowler); his father worked as a potter's presser. Underwood worked as a potter's flowerer as a child and worked as a potter's presser as an adult.

== Football career ==
Underwood was born in Hanley, Staffordshire and in his youth played in the local church league for Hanley Tabernacle and Etruria along with Bill Rowley. He and Rowley joined Stoke in 1887 in time for the first season of the Football League. Underwood made his league debut on 8 September 1888, at full-back for Stoke in a 2–0 defeat by West Bromwich Albion at the Victoria Ground. He played all of Stoke's 22 Football League matches in 1888–89. Underwood played at left-back in Stoke's first season in the Football League and missed only one match in the next three seasons (at Walsall in 1891). He retired in 1893 when he was only 24 after he cut his knee and the wound became infected, although he was still called up to play occasionally afterwards. Underwood then worked in the local pot banks but suffered many health problems which led to his death in 1928.

== Professional Baseball ==
In 1890 Underwood played professional baseball for Stoke in the National League of Baseball of Great Britain.

== International career ==
He went on to win two full England caps, appearing alongside fellow Stoke teammates Bill Rowley and Tommy Clare.

== Style of play ==
Underwood stood at 6 ft tall and weighed 13 st and along with Tommy Clare, formed an imposing barricade and were often referred to as a pair rather than an individual. Underwood's balding head and sunken eyes gave him a demonic appearance.

His main assets were his heavy tackles and his long clearances. Members of the local press often criticised him for being too impetuous and rash. He occasionally mis-kicked his clearances and on one occasion against Accrington in September 1888, he hoofed the ball vertically in the air which resulted in Accrington scoring an easy goal. This led to The Sentinel claiming that Underwood should stop trying to break windows.

== Career statistics ==
=== Club ===
Appearances and goals by club, season and competition
Club	Season	League			FA Cup		Total	
Club	Season	Division	Apps	Goals	Apps	Goals	Apps	Goals
Stoke	1887–88	–	–		4	0	4	0
Stoke	1888–89	Football League	22	0	0	0	22	0
Stoke	1889–90	Football League	22	0	4	0	26	0
Stoke	1890–91	Football Alliance	21	0	3	0	24	0
Stoke	1891–92	Football League	22	0	5	0	27	0
Stoke	1892–93	First Division	26	0	1	0	27	0
Stoke	1893–94	First Division	1	0	0	0	1	0
Stoke	1894–95	First Division	1	0	0	0	1	0
Career total			115	0	17	0	132	0

=== International ===
National team	Year	Apps	Goals
England	1891	1	0
England	1892	1	0
Total		2	0

== Honours ==
Stoke

- Football Alliance: 1890–91

'England

- British Home Championship: 1890–91
