= Alec Wallace =

English footballer

Personal information
- Full name: Alexander Wallace
- Date of birth: 1872
- Place of birth: Darwen, England
- Date of death: 1950 (aged 77–78)
- Place of death: Bolton, England
- Position: Outside left

Senior career*
| Years | Team | Apps | (Gls) |
| – | Blackpool | | |
| 1894 | Ardwick | 6 | (1) |
| 1894 | Baltimore Orioles | | |
| 1897–1898 | Small Heath | 2 | (1) |
| 1898–1??? | Hereford Thistle | | |
- * Club domestic league appearances and goals

Alexander Wallace (1872–1950) was an English professional footballer who played in the Football League for Ardwick and Small Heath. He played as an outside left.

== Career ==
Wallace was born in Darwen, Lancashire. He played for Blackpool before making his Football League debut for Ardwick in the 1893–94 season. In 1894 he, together with teammates Mitchell Calvey, Archibald Ferguson and Tommy Little, left Ardwick, by then renamed Manchester City, to play for Baltimore Orioles F.C. in the newly formed American League of Professional Football. Most of the teams in the league, formed by owners of the National Baseball League in competition with the American Football Association, featured coaches, if not players, from their associated baseball team. Baltimore Orioles brought in a soccer coach, A.W. Stewart, whose team of imported professionals won their opening games comprehensively, thus upsetting the other owners. The U.S. government threatened to investigate the use of foreign professionals, and in face of this threat and the owners' reluctance to subsidise poorly attended matches, the league soon folded.

On the players' return to England, Little was forgiven by his former employers and restored to Manchester City's team. Wallace, on the other hand, was unable to find another footballing employment until he signed for Small Heath in 1897. He played only twice in the league for Small Heath: his "three years of inactivity showed", and after a few months he dropped into non-league football with Hereford Thistle.

Wallace died in Bolton, Lancashire, in 1950, aged about 78.
