= RFM (market research) =

Method for analyzing customer value

RFM is a method used for analyzing customer value and segmenting customers which is commonly used in database marketing and direct marketing. It has received particular attention in the retail and professional services industries.

RFM stands for the three dimensions:

- Recency – How recently did the customer purchase?
- Frequency – How often do they purchase?
- Monetary Value – How much do they spend?

== Core model ==
Customer purchases may be represented by a table with columns for the customer name, date of purchase and purchase value. There are many approaches to quantitatively defining RFM values, and the best approaches will be dependent on customer journey and business model. One approach to RFM is to assign a score for each dimension on a scale from 1 to 10. The maximum score represents the preferred behavior and a formula could be used to calculate the three scores for each customer. For example, a service-based business could use these calculations:

- Recency = 10 – the number of months that have passed since the customer last purchased
- Frequency = the maximum of "the number of purchases by the customer in the last 12 months (with a limit of 10)" and 1
- Monetary = the highest value of all purchases by the customer expressed in relation to some benchmark value

For example, if the monetary benchmark allocated a score of 10 to annual spend over $500, for a customer who had made three purchases in the last year, the most recent being 3 months ago, and spent $600 in the year, their scores would be: R=7; F=3; M=10. Alternatively, categories can be defined for each attribute, e.g. recency might be broken into three categories: customers with purchases within the last 90 days; between 91 and 365 days; and longer than 365 days. Such categories may be derived from business rules or using data mining techniques to find meaningful breaks.

Once each of the attributes has appropriate categories defined, segments are created from the intersection of the values. If there were three categories for each attribute, then the resulting matrix would have twenty-seven possible combinations. One well-known commercial approach uses five bins per attributes, which yields 125 segments. Companies may also decide to collapse certain subsegments, if the gradations appear too small to be useful. The resulting segments can be ordered from most valuable (highest recency, frequency, and value) to least valuable (lowest recency, frequency, and value). Identifying the most valuable RFM segments can capitalize on chance relationships in the data used for this analysis. For this reason, it is highly recommended that another set of data be used to validate the results of the RFM segmentation process. Advocates of this technique point out that it has the virtue of simplicity: no specialized statistical software is required, and the results are readily understood by business people. In the absence of other targeting techniques, it can provide a lift in response rates for promotions.

== Usage ==
RFM is widely used for segmenting customers in the catalog industry. Brynjolfsson et al. apply it to analysing internet search and sales behaviour.

== Variations ==
RFD – Recency, Frequency, Duration is a modified version of RFM analysis that can be used to analyze consumer behavior of viewership/readership/surfing oriented business products. (For example, amount of time spent by surfers on Wikipedia)

RFE – Recency, Frequency, Engagement is a broader version of the RFD analysis, where Engagement can be defined to include visit duration, pages per visit or other such metrics.

RFMTC – Recency, Frequency, Monetary Value, Time, Churn rate is an augmented RFM model proposed by Yeh et al. (2009). The model utilizes Bernoulli sequence in probability theory and creates formulas that calculate the probability of a customer buying at the next promotional or marketing campaign. This model has been implemented by Alexandros Ioannidis for datasets such as the Blood Transfusion and CDNOW data sets.
