= John Walker (footballer, born 1866) =

Scottish footballer (1866–1921)

Personal information
- Date of birth: 1866
- Place of birth: Carluke, Scotland
- Date of death: 1921 (aged 54–55)
- Position: Full back

Senior career*
Years	Team	Apps	(Gls)
1890–1892	Burnley	40	(0)
1892–1893	Clyde		
1893–1894	Sunderland	6	(0)
1895	Stoke	0	(0)
1894–1895	Manchester City	19	(1)
- * Club domestic league appearances and goals

John Walker (1866–1921) was a Scottish footballer who played for Burnley, Clyde, Manchester City, Stoke and Sunderland.

He did not play for Leicester Fosse as previously reported. That John Walker had been signed from Everton in 1895.

== Career statistics ==
Appearances and goals by club, season and competition
Club	Season	League			FA Cup		Total	
Club	Season	Division	Apps	Goals	Apps	Goals	Apps	Goals
Burnley	1890–91	The Football League	21	0	0	0	21	0
Burnley	1891–92	The Football League	19	0	3	0	22	0
Burnley	Total		40	0	3	0	43	0
Sunderland	1893–94	First Division	6	0	0	0	6	0
Stoke	1894–95	First Division	0	0	0	0	0	0
Manchester City	1894–95	Second Division	19	1	0	0	19	1
Career total			65	1	3	0	68	1
