= Alec Gillies =

Scottish footballer

Personal information
- Full name: Alexander Gillies
- Date of birth: 14 June 1875
- Place of birth: Cowdenbeath, Scotland
- Date of death: 1932 (aged 56–57)
- Position: Winger

Senior career*
| Years | Team | Apps | (Gls) |
| 1894–1895 | Lochgelly United | | |
| 1895 | Bolton Wanderers | 6 | (0) |
| 1896 | Manchester City | 3 | (0) |
| 1896 | Lochgelly United | | |
| 1896 | Heart of Midlothian | | |
| 1896–1897 | The Wednesday | 2 | (0) |
| 1897–1898 | Leicester Fosse | 4 | (0) |
| 1898 | Lochgelly United | | |
| 1898–1899 | Dumbarton | 0 | (0) |
| 1900 | Lochgelly United | | |
| Total | | 15 | (0) |
- * Club domestic league appearances and goals

Alexander Gillies (14 June 1875 – 1932) was a Scottish footballer who played in the Football League for Bolton Wanderers, Leicester Fosse, Manchester City and The Wednesday.
