= Database marketing =

Form of direct marketing

Database marketing is a form of direct marketing that uses databases of customers or potential customers to generate personalized communications in order to promote a product or service for marketing purposes. The method of communication can be any addressable medium, as in direct marketing.

The distinction between direct and database marketing stems primarily from the attention paid to the analysis of data. Database marketing emphasizes the use of statistical techniques to develop models of customer behavior, which are then used to select customers for communications. As a consequence, database marketers also tend to be heavy users of data warehouses, because having a greater amount of data about customers increases the likelihood that a more accurate model can be built.

There are two main types of marketing databases, consumer databases, and business databases. Consumer databases are primarily geared towards companies that sell to consumers, often abbreviated as [business-to-consumer] (B2C) or BtoC. Business marketing databases are often much more advanced in the information that they can provide. This is mainly because business databases aren't restricted by the same privacy laws as consumer databases.

The "database" is usually name, address, and transaction history details from internal sales or delivery systems, or a bought-in compiled "list" from another organization, which has captured that information from its customers. Typical sources of compiled lists are charity donation forms, application forms for any free product or contest, product warranty cards, subscription forms, and credit application forms.

== Background ==
Database marketing emerged in the 1980s as a new, improved form of direct marketing. During this period traditional "list broking" was under pressure to modernize, because it was offline and tape-based, and because lists tended to hold limited data. At the same time, with new technologies enabling customer responses to be recorded, direct response marketing was in ascendancy, with the aim of opening up a two-way communication, or dialogue, with customers.

Robert D. "Bob" and Kate Kestnbaum developed new metrics for direct marketing such as customer lifetime value, and applied financial modelling and econometrics to marketing strategies. In 1967, they founded the consulting firm Kestnbaum & Co, that employed several notable database marketeers such as Robert Blattberg, Rick Courtheaux and Robert Shaw.

Kestnbaum collaborated with Shaw in the 1980s on several online marketing database developments - for BT (20 million customers), BA (10 million) and Barclays (13 million). Shaw incorporated new features into the Kestnbaum approach, including telephone and field sales channel automation, contact strategy optimization, campaign management and co-ordination, marketing resource management, marketing accountability and marketing analytics. The designs of these systems have been widely copied subsequently and incorporated into CRM and MRM packages in the 1990s and later.

The earliest recorded definition of Database Marketing was in 1988 in the book of the same name (Shaw and Stone 1988 Database Marketing):

"Database Marketing is an interactive approach to marketing, which uses individually addressable marketing media and channels (such as E mail, telephone and the sales force): to extend help to a company's target audience; to stimulate their demand; and to stay close to them by recording and keeping an electronic database memory of the customer, prospect and all commercial contacts, to help improve all future contacts and to ensure more realistic of all marketing."

== Growth and evolution ==
The growth of database marketing is driven by a number of environmental issues. Fletcher, Wheeler and Wright (1991) classified these issues into four main categories:

1. Changing role of direct marketing
  - The move to relationship marketing for competitive advantage.
  - The decline in the effectiveness of traditional media.
  - The overcrowding and myopia of existing sales channels.
2. Changing cost structures
  - The decline in electronic processing costs.
  - The increase in marketing costs.
3. Changing technology
  - The advent of new methods of shopping and paying.
  - The development of economical methods for differentiating customer communication.
4. Changing market conditions
  - The desire to measure the impact of marketing efforts.
  - The fragmentation of consumer and business markets.

Shaw and Stone (1988) noted that companies go through evolutionary phases in the developing their database marketing systems. They identify the four phases of database development as:

1. mystery lists;
2. buyer databases;
3. coordinated customer communication; and
4. integrated marketing.

== Sources of data ==
Although organizations of any size can employ database marketing, it is particularly well-suited to companies with large numbers of customers. This is because a large population provides greater opportunity to find segments of customers or prospects that can be communicated with in a customized manner. In smaller (and more homogeneous) databases, it will be difficult to justify on economic terms the investment required to differentiate messages. As a result, database marketing has flourished in sectors, such as financial services, telecommunications, and retail, all of which have the ability to generate significant amounts of transaction data for millions of clients.

Database marketing applications can be divided logically between those marketing programs that reach existing customers and those that are aimed at prospective customers.

=== Consumer data ===
In terms of existing customers, sophisticated marketers tend to create large customer databases. These may include a variety of data, including name and address, history of shopping and purchases, demographics, and the history of past communications to and from customers. For larger companies with millions of customers, such data warehouses can often be multiple terabytes in size.

Marketing to prospects general, database marketers seek to have as data available about customers and prospects as possible. For marketing relies extensively on third-party sources of data. In most developed countries, there are a number of providers of such data. Such data is usually restricted to name, address, and telephone, along with demographics, some supplied by consumers, and others inferred by the data compiler. Companies may also acquire prospect data directly through the use of sweepstakes, contests, on-line registrations, and other lead generation activities.

=== Business data ===
For many business-to-business (B2B) company marketers, the number of customers and prospects will be smaller than that of comparable business-to-consumer (B2C) companies. Also, their relationships with customers will often rely on intermediaries, such as salespeople, agents, and dealers, and the number of transactions per customer may be small. As a result, business-to-business marketers may not have as much data at their disposal as business-to-consumer marketers.

One other complication is that B2B marketers in targeting teams or "accounts" and not individuals may produce many contacts from a single organization. Determining which contact to communicate with through direct marketing may be difficult. On the other hand, it is the database for business-to-business marketers which often includes data on the business activity about the respective client.

These data become critical to segment markets or define target audiences, e.g. purchases of software license renewals by telecom companies could help identify which technologist is in charge of software installations vs. software procurement, etc. Customers in Business-to-Business environments often tend to be loyal since they need after-sales-service for their products and appreciate information on product upgrades and service offerings. This loyalty can be tracked by a database.

Sources of customer data often come from the sales force employed by the company and from the service engineers. Increasingly, online interactions with customers are providing B2B marketers with a lower cost source of customer information.

For prospect data, businesses can purchase data from compilers of business data, as well as gather information from their direct sales efforts, on-line sites, and specialty publications.

== Analytics and modeling ==
Companies with large databases of customer information risk being "data rich and information poor." As a result, a considerable amount of attention is paid to the analysis of data. For instance, companies often segment their customers based on the analysis of differences in behavior, needs, or attitudes of their customers. A common method of behavioral segmentation is RFM (customer value), in which customers are placed into sub segments based on the recency, frequency, and monetary value of past purchases. Van den Poel (2003) gives an overview of the predictive performance of a large class of variables typically used in database-marketing modeling.

They may also develop predictive models, which forecast the propensity of customers to behave in certain ways. For instance, marketers may build a model that ranks customers on their likelihood to respond to a promotion. Commonly employed statistical techniques for such models include logistic regression and neural networks.

Other types of analysis include:

- Impact assessment helps a business to understand how actions taken by the business affected their customer behavior, and also allow for some predictions of customer reaction to proposed changes.
- Customers as assets measures the lifetime value of the customer base and allows businesses to measure several factors such as the cost of acquisition and the rate of churn.
- Cross-sell analysis identifies product and service relationships to better understand which are the most popular product combinations. Any identified relationships can then be used to cross-sell and up-sell in the future.
- Critical lag allows a business to deliver specific customer communications based on an individual's purchase patterns, helping to increase loyalty and improve customer retention.

== Laws and regulations ==
In recent years, with the increasing adoption of database marketing, there have been more calls for regulations concerning customer data protection. One such example is the formation of GDPR, which stands for General Data Protection Regulation, by the European Union to decide how consumer data can be used and how consumers can control it. In the United States, there are a variety of state and federal laws, including the Fair Credit Reporting Act, or FCRA (which regulates the gathering and use of credit data), the Health Insurance Portability and Accountability Act (HIPAA) (which regulates the gathering and use of consumer health data), and various programs that enable consumers to suppress their telephones numbers from telemarketing.

== Advances ==
While the idea of storing customer data in electronic formats to use them for database-marketing purposes has been around for decades, the computer systems available today make it possible to gain a comprehensive history of client behavior on-screen while the business is transacting with each individual, producing thus real-time business intelligence for the company. This ability enables what is called one-to-one marketing or personalization.

Today's Customer Relationship Management (CRM) systems use the stored data not only for direct marketing purposes but to manage the complete relationship with individual customer contacts and to develop more customized product and service offerings. However, a combination of CRM, content management and business intelligence tools are making delivery of personalized information a reality.

Marketers trained in the use of these tools are able to carry out customer nurturing, which is a tactic that attempts to communicate with each individual in an organization at the right time, using the right information to meet that client's need to progress through the process of identifying a problem, learning options available to resolve it, selecting the right solution, and making the purchasing decision.

Because of the complexities of B2B marketing and the intricacies of corporate operations, the demands placed on any marketing organization to formulate the business process by which such a sophisticated series of procedures may be brought into existence are significant. It is often for this reason that large marketing organizations engage the use of an expert in marketing process strategy and information technology (IT), or a marketing IT process strategist. Although more technical in nature than often marketers require, a system integrator (SI) can also play an equivalent role to the marketing IT process strategist, particularly at the time that new technology tools need to be configured and rolled out.

== Challenges and limitations ==
A major challenge for databases is the reality of obsolescence - including the lag time between when data was acquired and when the database is used.

== See also ==
- Customer data platform
- Customer relationship management
- Direct marketing
- Drip marketing
