= Peter Mortimer (footballer) =

Scottish footballer

Peter Mortimer (7 August 1875 – 1951) was a Scottish footballer.

Mortimer was born in Calton, Glasgow, and played for a variety of local junior clubs in the city before moving to London in 1894 to play for Woolwich Arsenal, being one of many Scottish players at the club at the time. He made his competitive debut in Arsenal's first league match of the 1894–95 Second Division campaign, away to Lincoln City on 1 September 1894; he scored but Arsenal lost 5–2. Despite his youth (he was only 19), he proved himself that season as a regular goalscoring forward and finished that season as Woolwich Arsenal's top scorer, with 14 goals in 22 games.

The next season, Mortimer generally played at left half rather than up front, and thus scored fewer goals; he still bagged nine that season, including a hat-trick in a 7–0 defeat of Crewe Alexandra. However, at the end of the 1895–96 season he was transferred to Chatham for unknown "political" reasons. In all he played 49 first-class matches for Arsenal and scored 23 goals. After leaving football he worked as a railway carriage painter and ironmonger. He died in 1951 at the age of 76.
