= Robert Shaw (business writer) =

- Born: 1950 (age 75–76); Manchester
- Occupations: Business author and consultant
- Known for: Book of the Year Author

Robert Shaw (born 1950, Manchester UK) is a business author and consultant in the field of marketing, particularly Marketing performance measurement and management and Database marketing.

== Life and career ==
Shaw received his master's degree and Ph.D. at Cambridge University, both in mathematical physics, and he also holds an MSc in Operations Research. He worked for Andersen Consulting leading consulting projects and developing new concepts on marketing data and metrics and then in 1989 founded VBMF, his own consulting firm. He has been consulted by many large companies – including BP, IBM, Manchester United, Nestle and Unilever and has a Brand Leadership Award from the World Brands Congress; CEO Magazine has named him “leading new-generation business guru”; the Management Consultants Association and the Chartered Institute of Marketing have both awarded him Book of the Year Author. He is currently an Honorary Professor of Marketing Metrics at Cass Business School.

== Key Ideas ==
Two key ideas run through most of Shaw's writing.

1. Marketing automation: the idea that the marketing function should embrace IT to improve its efficiency and effectiveness. Shaw has tracked the uses and abuses of IT in marketing for over 20 years and defined best practices in this field.

- 1988 – Database Marketing
- 1988 – Survey of Marketing Software Packages
- 1991 – Computer-Aided Marketing and Selling
- 1994 – How to Transform Marketing Through IT
- 2009 – Rethinking the Chain – Make marketing leaner, faster and better

2. Marketing performance measurement and management. Shaw identified the need for marketing to become more measurable and accountable and his researches continue to define best practice in this field.

- 1997 – Marketing Accountability
- 1998 – Improving Marketing Effectiveness
- 1999 – Measuring and valuing customer relationships
- 2002 – Getting better value from marketing investments
- 2002 – How to Control Marketing – ICAEW Guide
- 2005 – Marketing Payback – Is Your Marketing Profitable
- 2008 – Return on Ideas: Better Results from Finance and Marketing Working Together

== See also ==
- Customer relationship management
- Marketing effectiveness
- Marketing ROI
- Demand chain
