= 1893–94 United Counties League =

1894 United Counties League
Tournament details
- Country: England
- Teams: 9

Final positions
- Champions: Derby County
- Runner-up: West Bromwich Albion

The 1894 United Counties League was a competition contested by West Midlands, East Midlands and Sheffield football clubs. It was won by Derby County.

== Format ==
The competition was organised as two separate leagues with the winner of each league playing each other in a final to determine the overall winner.

Group A contained four teams, Small Heath, Stoke, West Bromwich Albion and Wolverhampton Wanderers.

Group B contained five teams, Derby County, Nottingham Forest, Notts County, Sheffield United and Sheffield Wednesday.

== 1894 Competition ==
=== Group A ===
==== Table ====
Pos	Club	P	W	D	L	F	A	Pts
1	West Bromwich Albion	6	4	0	2	20	15	8
2	Stoke	6	4	0	2	12	12	8
3	Small Heath	6	2	1	3	14	14	5
4	Wolverhampton Wanderers	6	1	1	4	10	15	3

==== Results ====
Home \ Away	SMH	STK	WBA	WOL
Small Heath		3–0	4–5	3–3
Stoke	2–1		5–2	3–0
West Bromwich Albion	3–1	5–0		
Wolverhampton Wanderers	1–2	1–2		

Legend: Blue = home team win; Yellow = draw; Red = away team win.

=== Group B ===
==== Table ====
Pos	Club	P	W	D	L	F	A	Pts
1	Derby County	8	5	2	1	22	7	12
2	Nottingham Forest	8	4	3	1	15	10	11
3	Sheffield Wednesday	8	2	3	3	15	15	7
4	Sheffield United	7	1	3	3	4	8	5
5	Notts County	7	1	1	5	6	22	3

==== Results ====
Home \ Away	DER	NOT	NTC	SHU	WED
Derby County		0–0		2–0	
Nottingham Forest	0–3		1–0	3–1	5–1
Notts County		3–4		0–0	
Sheffield United	0–2	0–0			2–0
Sheffield Wednesday		2–2		1–1	

Legend: Blue = home team win; Yellow = draw; Red = away team win.

=== Final ===
1894
Final

Derby County	1–1	West Bromwich Albion
		Perry

1894
Final Replay

Derby County	2–1	West Bromwich Albion
A Goodall, McMillan		McLeod

Attendance: 6000

Charlie Perry is credited in some reports as scoring for West Bromwich Albion in the first match.
