= Jack Edwards (footballer, born 1876) =

Welsh footballer

Personal information
- Full name: John Henry Edwards
- Date of birth: 1876
- Place of birth: Wales
- Date of death: 1939 (aged 62–63)
- Position: Midfielder

Senior career*
Years	Team	Apps	(Gls)
- Aberystwyth Town

International career
1898	Wales	1	(0)
- * Club domestic league appearances and goals

Jack Edwards (1876 – 1939) was a Welsh international footballer. He was part of the Wales national football team, playing 1 match on 19 February 1898 against Ireland. At club level, he played for Aberystwyth Town.

== See also ==
- List of Wales international footballers (alphabetical)
