= John Ackroyd (footballer, born 1868) =

English footballer

Personal information
- Date of birth: 1868
- Place of birth: Heanor, England
- Position: Forward

Senior career*
Years	Team	Apps	(Gls)
????–1891	Heanor Town		
1891–1894	Grimsby Town	38	(17)
1894−1895	Rotherham Town	17	(4)
1895–????	Heanor Town		
- * Club domestic league appearances and goals

John Ackroyd (born 1868) was an English footballer who played as a forward in the Football League for Grimsby Town and Rotherham Town. In 1891−92 in a match for Grimsby against Lincoln City he scored four goals in a 6−1 victory. He also played for Heanor Town.
