= William Ecclestone (footballer) =

English footballer (1873–1937)

Personal information
- Full name: William Ecclestone
- Date of birth: 1873
- Place of birth: Preston, England
- Date of death: 1937 (aged 63–64)
- Position: Wing half

Senior career*
Years	Team	Apps	(Gls)
1893–1894	North Meols		
1894–1895	Grimsby Town	29	(13)
1895–1900	Preston North End	72	(6)
1900–1904	Kettering		
1904–1905	Oldham Athletic		
1905–1906	Barrow		
1906–1908	Lancaster		
1908–19??	Clitheroe		
- * Club domestic league appearances and goals

William Ecclestone (1873 – 1937) was an English professional footballer who played as a wing half.
