= Billy Lewis (footballer, born 1864) =

Welsh footballer

Personal information
- Full name: William Lewis
- Date of birth: 1864
- Place of birth: Bangor, Wales
- Date of death: 1935 (aged 70–71)
- Position: Forward

Senior career*
Years	Team	Apps	(Gls)
1881	Bangor Rovers		
1882–1888	Bangor City	?	
1888	Everton	3	(1)
1889	Bangor City	?	
1889–1892	Crewe Alexandra	?	
1892–1896	Chester	?	
1896–1897	Manchester City	12	(4)
1897–1898	Chester	?	

International career
1885–1898	Wales	27	(8)
- * Club domestic league appearances and goals

Billy Lewis (1864–1935) was a Welsh international footballer in the late 19th century who played as a centre forward.

He played for Bangor City before joining Everton for a brief period in the first ever season of The Football League, making 3 league appearances with the Toffees in September 1888.

William Lewis was described by one source as, 'a speedy forward and very clever – does not use sufficient judgement'. William Lewis made his Club and League debut on 8 September 1888, playing at centre–forward, at Anfield, the then home of Everton. The home team defeated the visitors Accrington 2–1. William Lewis scored his debut Club and League goal (his only League goal for Everton and his only League goal in the top–flight) on 29 September 1888, playing as a winger, at Pike's Lane, the then home of Bolton Wanderers. Everton were defeated by the home team 6–2, William Lewis scoring the first of Everton' two goals in the match. William Lewis appeared in three of the 22 League games played by Everton in season 1888–89 and scored one League goal. After the heavy defeat at Bolton Lewis did not play for Everton again and did not play top–flight football again. When Lewis played for Manchester City the latter were in Division Two.

Billy Lewis returned to Bangor in January 1889 before spells with Crewe Alexandra and Chester.

In 1896 he moved to Manchester City, and he made 13 appearances for City, scoring on 4 occasions.

Lewis gained 13 Welsh caps whilst with Chester, which remained a club record for more than 100 years. His record was broken when Angus Eve was capped 35 times for Trinidad and Tobago, although for 24 of these caps he was on loan away from Chester, and thus Lewis could still be argued to be the record holder.
