= Matt Reilly (footballer) =

Irish footballer (1874-1954)

Personal information
- Full name: Matthew Michael Reilly
- Date of birth: 22 March 1874
- Place of birth: Donnybrook, Dublin, Republic of Ireland
- Date of death: 9 December 1954 (aged 80)
- Place of death: Dublin, Ireland
- Height: 5 ft 11 in (1.80 m)
- Position: Goalkeeper

Youth career
- Benburb

Senior career*
Years	Team	Apps	(Gls)
1893–1899	Royal Artillery	42	(0)
1895	→ Southampton (loan)	2	(0)
1896	→ Freemantle (loan)		
1899–1904	Portsmouth	138	(0)
1904–1905	Dundee	3	(0)
1905–1906	Notts County	16	(0)
1906–1907	Tottenham Hotspur	19	(0)
1907–1909	Shelbourne		

International career
1900–1902	Ireland	2	(0)
- * Club domestic league appearances and goals

Matthew Michael Reilly (22 March 1874 – 9 December 1954) was an Irish international goalkeeper who played most of his career with Portsmouth in the Southern League. He also had spells with Southampton and Tottenham Hotspur in the Southern League, with Notts County in the Football League, with Dundee in the Scottish Football League and with Shelbourne in the Irish League. Throughout his career he was known as either "Gunner Reilly" or "Ginger".

== Playing career ==
Reilly was born in Donnybrook, Dublin and played Gaelic football in his youth. He joined the Royal Artillery and while serving in Glasgow took up association football as a goalkeeper with Junior side, Benburb.

=== Royal Artillery (Portsmouth) ===
By 1893, he was a member of the Royal Artillery side which reached the final of the FA Amateur Cup in 1896 as well as two Army Cup finals. In the 1896 Amateur Cup final, played against Bishop Auckland, Reilly was voted "Man of the Match" when he kept the score down to a 1–0 defeat.

There is evidence that because of his Gaelic football background where players can handle the ball, when he made a save he would dribble the ball downfield Gaelic football fashion. Because of this practice, the box was added to the football pitch preventing the goalkeeper from touching the ball with his hands outside the box.

In December 1895, he played two matches on loan to Southampton who were playing their second season in the Southern League. He replaced Tom Cain and both matches (against Reading and Royal Ordnance) ended in 5–0 victories. He was described in the local press as a "brilliant" player, who was both quick and sure in his handling and kicking. He also spent a period on loan to another Southampton side, Freemantle.

He became a key member of the Royal Artillery side and helped them rise to join the Second Division of the Southern League in 1897 and win the Division title at the end of the 1897–98 season. The R.A. were less successful in their first season in the top division, finishing at the foot of the table, and subsequently the club folded.

=== Portsmouth ===
By now, Reilly's military career was over and in July 1899, he was snapped up by manager Frank Brettell and joined Portsmouth who had been founded a year earlier and were elected as members of an expanded Southern League for the 1899–1900 season. During Reilly's five seasons at Fratton Park, Portsmouth were one of the dominant teams in the Southern League, winning the championship in 1901–02, and never finishing outside the top four. He was awarded a benefit match, played against West Ham United, on 29 April 1901.

Reilly was recognised for his form with selection for Ireland on two occasions, both narrow defeats by England in 1900 and 1902. For the first match, played at Lansdowne Road, Dublin on 17 March 1900, the England team were confidently expecting an easy match after five successive victories, including winning 13–2 the previous year. The England selectors chose five debutantes, including Reilly's Portsmouth colleague, Dan Cunliffe, who made his solitary England appearance at inside right. In the event, the game was far more difficult than expected, with England only managing a 2–0 victory, with goals from Charlie Sagar and Harry Johnson, who were also both making their international debut.

Reilly was not selected for the 1901 match against England, played at The Dell, but was called up again for the 1902 match, played at the Balmoral Showgrounds, Belfast on 22 March 1902. This time, England's margin of victory was even narrower, with the only goal coming from Jimmy Settle with less than five minutes remaining, after England's goalkeeper, Billy George, had saved a penalty from Robert Milne.

=== Later career ===
In 1904, after five season with Portsmouth, Reilly moved to Scotland where he spent a season with Dundee, managing only three appearances.

Reilly spent the 1905–06 season in the Football League with Notts County. He made an inauspicious start in a 3–0 defeat at Stoke and lost his place mid-season to Albert Iremonger (who was the tallest player in the league at the time, measuring 6 ft 6 in).

In October 1906, he returned to the Southern League, after a transfer to Tottenham Hotspur for a fee of £100. After a season in London, Reilly returned to Dublin to play for Shelbourne, helping them reach the 1908 Irish Cup Final, where he finished on the losing side to Dublin rivals, Bohemians, going down 3–1 in a replay.

On his retirement, he returned to Hampshire, becoming a publican in Southsea. He remained fondly remembered at Fratton Park and was amongst the guests who celebrated Portsmouth's fiftieth anniversary in 1948.

He died in his native Dublin in December 1954, aged 80.

== Honours ==
Royal Artillery

- FA Amateur Cup runners-up: 1896
- Southern League Division Two champions: 1897–98

Portsmouth

- Southern League champions: 1901–02

Shelbourne

- Irish Cup runners-up: 1908
