= United Counties League (1890s) =

English football league

The United Counties League in the 1890s was a short lived league between football clubs in the Midlands and Sheffield which ran in addition (and concurrently) to the Football League.

The competition only ran for two seasons, 1893/94 and 1894/95.

The 1893/94 was the only year the competition finished and was won by Derby County. The 1894/95 competition fizzled out as sides failed to complete their fixtures. Nottingham Forest were top of the league that season when the league collapsed.
