= James Henderson (footballer, born 1871) =

Scottish footballer (1871–1950)

Personal information
- Full name: James Henderson
- Date of birth: 1871
- Place of birth: Leith, Scotland
- Date of death: 1950 (aged 78–79)
- Position: Inside forward

Senior career*
Years	Team	Apps	(Gls)
1892–1893	Leith Athletic		
1894–1898	Bury	87	(27)
Total		87	(27)
- * Club domestic league appearances and goals

James Henderson (1871–1950) was a Scottish footballer who played in the Football League for Bury.
