= Sam Davies (footballer, born 1870) =

English footballer

Personal information
- Full name: Samuel Davies
- Date of birth: 1870
- Place of birth: Nantwich, England
- Date of death: 1913 (aged 42–43)
- Position: Full back

Senior career*
Years	Team	Apps	(Gls)
1888–1889	Nantwich		
1889–1890	Crewe Alexandra		
1890–1891	Chester		
1891–1892	Nantwich		
1892–1893	Rossendale		
1893–1894	New Brompton		
1894–1896	Bury	42	(5)
1897–1898	Luton Town	25	(1)
1898–1899	Gravesend United		
1899–1900	Nantwich		
Total		67	(6)
- * Club domestic league appearances and goals

Samuel Davies (1870–1913) was an English footballer who played in the Football League for Bury and Luton Town.
