= Joe Clegg =

English footballer (1869–1902)

Personal information
- Full name: Joseph Clegg
- Date of birth: 1 May 1869
- Place of birth: Burnley, England
- Date of death: 14 February 1902 (aged 32)
- Place of death: Blackburn, England
- Position: Centre half

Senior career*
Years	Team	Apps	(Gls)
1888–1889	Accrington Hornets		
1889–1890	Bell's Temperance		
1890–1891	Ramsbottom		
1891–1894	Accrington	1	(0)
1894–1899	Bury	104	(6)
Total		105	(6)
- * Club domestic league appearances and goals

Joseph Clegg (1 May 1869 – 14 February 1902) was an English footballer who played in the Football League for Accrington and Bury.
