= George Evans (footballer, born 1864) =

English footballer

Personal information
- Date of birth: 27 June 1864
- Place of birth: Handsworth, West Midlands, England
- Date of death: 4 April 1947 (aged 82)
- Position: Forward

Senior career*
Years	Team	Apps	(Gls)
- Derby County
- West Bromwich Albion
1890–1891	Manchester United	1	(1)
- * Club domestic league appearances and goals

George Evans (27 June 1864 – 4 May 1947) was an English footballer. His regular position was as a forward. He played for Derby County, West Bromwich Albion and Manchester United.
