= Wally McReddie =

Scottish footballer (1871–1939)

Personal information
- Full name: Wallace McReddie
- Date of birth: 1871
- Place of birth: Lochee, Scotland
- Date of death: 1939 (aged 68)
- Place of death: Middlesbrough
- Position: Inside forward

Senior career*
Years	Team	Apps	(Gls)
1887	Lochee		
1888	Dundee Harp		
1889–1890	Stoke	11	(2)
1891–1893	Middlesbrough Ironopolis		
1893–1894	Stoke	33	(10)
1894–1895	Manchester City	31	(12)
1895	Bolton Wanderers	2	(0)
1896	Celtic		
Total		77	(24)
- * Club domestic league appearances and goals

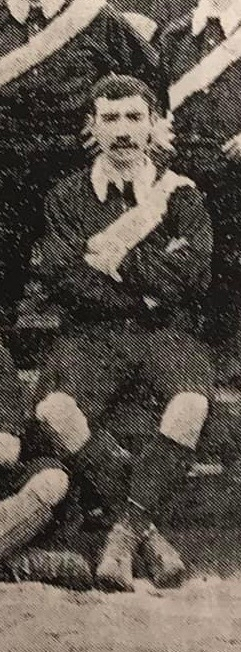

Wallace McReddie (1871–1939) was a Scottish footballer who played as an inside forward in the Football League for Middlesbrough Ironopolis, Manchester City, Bolton Wanderers, and Stoke.

== Career ==
McReddie started his career at local clubs, Lochee and Dundee Harp before moving to English club Stoke in 1889. In his first season with Stoke they had an awful campaign finishing bottom of the Football League and also failed to gain re-election. Stoke joined the Football Alliance and McReddie left the club and signed for Middlesbrough Ironopolis. He spent three seasons with the teesside club before he re-joined Stoke for the 1893–94 season where he played 30 league matches scoring 10 goals. At the end of the season McReddie then moved on to Manchester City and Bolton Wanderers before returning north of the border to Celtic.

== Career statistics ==
Appearances and goals by club, season and competition
Club	Season	League			FA Cup		Total	
Club	Season	Division	Apps	Goals	Apps	Goals	Apps	Goals
Stoke	1889–90	Football League	11	2	0	0	11	2
Stoke	1893–94	First Division	30	10	2	0	32	10
Stoke	1894–95	First Division	3	0	0	0	3	0
Stoke	Total		44	12	2	0	46	12
Manchester City	1894–95	Second Division	20	9	0	0	20	9
Manchester City	1895–96	Second Division	11	3	0	0	11	3
Manchester City	Total		31	12	0	0	31	12
Bolton Wanderers	1895–96	First Division	2	0	0	0	2	0
Career total			77	24	2	0	79	24
