= Frank Dyer =

Scottish footballer

Personal information
- Full name: Francis Dyer
- Date of birth: 4 February 1867
- Place of birth: Cardross, Scotland
- Date of death: 1936 (aged 68–69)
- Position: Midfielder

Senior career*
Years	Team	Apps	(Gls)
1887	Renton		
1888	Bolton Wanderers	1	(0)
1888	Renton		
1888	Vale of Leven		
1889	Warwick County		
1890–1892	West Bromwich Albion	41	(2)
1892	Royal Arsenal	5	(0)
1893–1898	Manchester City	36	(3)
- * Club domestic league appearances and goals

Francis Dyer (4 February 1867 – 1936) was a Scottish professional footballer who played in the Football League for Bolton Wanderers, Manchester City and West Bromwich Albion.

Aged 19/20 Dyer signed for Renton. He played at Renton for one season and travelled South to England in 1888.
