= West Bromwich Road =

Sports ground in Walsall, England

- Interactive map of West Bromwich Road
- Location: Walsall, England
- Coordinates: 52.5718°N 1.9777°W
- Capacity: 4,000
- Surface: Grass
- Record attendance: 4,000

Tenant
- Walsall F.C.

West Bromwich Road was a sports ground in Walsall, England. It was the home ground of Walsall F.C. between 1893 and 1895, and again from 1900 until 1901.

== History ==
Following complaints from local residents, Walsall left the Chuckery ground at the end of the 1892–93 season to move to West Bromwich Road., However, the ground was not ready for the start of the 1893–94 season, and the first two matches were played at the Oval in Wednesbury. West Bromwich Road featured a football pitch surrounded by a running track, with a stand on the western touchline and some banking behind the southern goal.

The first League match played at West Bromwich Road was 5–1 win over Crewe Alexandra on 23 September 1893, with 1,500 spectators present. Walsall left the ground at the end of the 1894–95 season to move to Fellows Park, but returned midway through the 1900–01 season after being evicted from the new ground. After finishing the season at West Bromwich Road, the club returned to Fellows Park for the 1901–02 season. The final match at the ground was a 0–0 draw with Middlesbrough on 22 April 1901 with only 800 spectators in attendance. The site was later used for housing.

=== ^{Notable People} ===
William Henry Lakin
