= Bobby Moffatt =

Scottish footballer (born 1873)

Personal information
- Full name: Robert Moffatt
- Date of birth: 1873
- Place of birth: Dumfries, Scotland
- Position: Wing half

Senior career*
Years	Team	Apps	(Gls)
1894–1895	St Mirren		
1895–1903	Manchester City	156	(7)
1907	Kilmarnock		
Total		156	(7)
- * Club domestic league appearances and goals

Robert Moffatt (1873–?) was a Scottish footballer who played in the Football League for Manchester City.
