= Tom Cain (footballer) =

English footballer

Personal information
- Full name: Thomas Cain
- Date of birth: 12 October 1874
- Place of birth: Sunderland, England
- Date of death: 1897 (aged 23)
- Position: Goalkeeper

Youth career
- Hebburn Argyle

Senior career*
Years	Team	Apps	(Gls)
1893–1894	Stoke	11	(0)
1894–1895	Everton	11	(0)
1895–1896	Southampton St. Mary's	10	(0)
1896	Grimsby Town	2	(0)
1896–1897	Hebburn Argyle		
1897	West Stanley		
- * Club domestic league appearances and goals

Thomas Cain (12 October 1874 – 1897) was an English footballer who played as goalkeeper for Stoke, Everton and Southampton St. Mary's in the 1890s.

== Football career ==
Cain was born in Sunderland and started his career with Hebburn Argyle before joining Stoke in 1893, where he took over in goal from the injured Bill Rowley for eleven league matches during the 1893–94 season.

In April 1894, he moved to Everton, making his first team debut as a replacement for the out of form Richard Williams in a 3–1 victory over Bolton Wanderers on 6 October 1894. Cain retained his place for a further nine league matches, before Williams was recalled. After two further appearances in March, Cain moved to the south coast to join Southampton St. Mary's for their second season in the Southern League.

In his Southampton debut, Cain replaced Walter Cox, but underwent a goalkeeper's nightmare, conceding seven goals away to Clapton on 19 October 1895. Despite this setback, he retained his place, although he missed several key games through injury, being replaced by the on-loan "Gunner" Reilly or by Cox.

Following the arrival of George Clawley, Cain moved on again at the end of the season, returning to the Football League with Grimsby Town for a then Southampton club record transfer fee of £20. Despite this fee, Cain only made two League appearances for Grimsby before returning to Hebburn Argyle in October.

== Career statistics ==
Club	Season	League			FA Cup		Total	
Club	Season	Division	Apps	Goals	Apps	Goals	Apps	Goals
Stoke	1893–94	First Division	11	0	0	0	11	0
Everton	1894–95	First Division	11	0	0	0	11	0
Southampton St. Mary's	1895–96	Southern League	10	0	0	0	10	0
Grimsby Town	1896–97	Second Division	2	0	0	0	2	0
Career Total			34	0	0	0	34	0
