= Ashton North End F.C. =

Ashton North End
- Full name: Ashton North End Football Club
- Nickname(s): The Onions
- Founded: 1886
- Dissolved: 1899
- Ground: Rayner Lane (1886-95) / Athletic Grounds (1895-99)
Home colours

Ashton North End Football Club was an English football club from Ashton-under-Lyne at the end of the 19th century.

== History ==
Ashton North End was formed in 1886 after Junior club Smallshaw changed their name and moved into adult football. Its were said to be named North End due to playing in the North End of Ashton-u-Lyne. They first played Cup football in 1887–88 reaching the latter stages of the Manchester Junior Cup in the Cup's first season. They followed this up the next season by winning the competition by beating local rivals Hurst Reserves in the Final. Later Ashton North End played in the Ashton & District League, finishing in the top half in 1891–92. They were also a founder member of the Football Federation (for Manchester area clubs) in 1892–93 and won the inaugural title with 30 points from 18 games. The club stepped up to The Combination in 1894 and were champions in its first season.

=== Merger with Ashton Town ===
In 1893 there was merger with Ashton Town, who had been formed a year earlier. The two teams merged, keeping the North End name. Two years later in 1895 they joined the Lancashire League for four seasons.

=== End of the club ===
At the end of the 1898–99 season, the club applied to join the Football League; however, after sending in the application, the club president withdrew funding, having lost "an enormous amount of money" after a "disastrous" season - an attempt to float the club as a limited company only had a lukewarm response. The application was unsuccessful, the club not earning a single vote, and the club "put up the shutters" before the following season got under way.

== Colours ==
The club's original colours were cardinal and royal blue, but in March 1892 the club adopted new red and white quartered jerseys, provided by a Mrs Earnshaw of the Horse & Jockey Inn. By the time of its final season, its colours were black jerseys with white stars.

== Ground ==
The club originally played at Rayner Lane, moving to the Athletic Grounds on Manchester Road, Ashton-u-Lyne in 1895.

== Players ==
Famous players for Ashton North End include:

- Herbert Chapman, who later led Huddersfield Town and Arsenal to the First Division title as manager, who played for Ashton North End between 1895 and 1896;
- Arthur Wharton, Britain's first black professional footballer, who played for Ashton North End from 1897 until their demise in 1899;
- James McBride, who had played for Scotland and in the Football League before joining Ashton.

== See also ==
- Ashton United, another club from Ashton, known as Hurst FC until 1946, that still exists today.

== External websites ==
- Ashton North End at the Football Club History Database
- Phil Vasili (1998). The First Black Footballer, Arthur Wharton, 1865–1930: An Absence of Memory. Psychology Press. ISBN 0-7146-4903-1.
