= Bert Read =

English footballer

Personal information
- Full name: Thomas Herbert Read
- Place of birth: Manchester, England
- Position: Full back

Senior career*
Years	Team	Apps	(Gls)
- Stretford
1895–1902	Manchester City	115	(2)
1902–1908	Newton Heath	35	(0)
- * Club domestic league appearances and goals

Thomas Herbert Read was an English footballer. His regular position was at full back. He was born in Manchester. He played for Stretford, Manchester City and Manchester United.
