= Jack Owen (footballer) =

Welsh footballer

Personal information
- Full name: John Owen
- Date of birth: 1866
- Place of birth: Chirk, Denbighshire, Wales
- Date of death: Unknown
- Position: Left half

Senior career*
Years	Team	Apps	(Gls)
?–1887	Chirk		
1887–1893	Newton Heath LYR	67	(3)

International career
1892	Wales	1	(0)
- * Club domestic league appearances and goals

John Owen (1866 – unknown) was a Welsh footballer who played as a left half for Newton Heath from 1887 to 1893. He also won one cap for Wales while with Newton Heath.

Born in Chirk, Denbighshire, Owen began his football career with Chirk before signing for Newton Heath in October 1887. His elder brother, William, also signed from Chirk at the same time. Owen scored six goals in 90 appearances over the span of a six-year career with the Heathens, before losing his place to new signing Fred Erentz, who would go on to serve the club for almost 10 years.
