= Harry Millar (footballer) =

English footballer

Personal information
- Full name: Harry Millar
- Date of birth: 5 August 1873
- Place of birth: Paisley, Scotland
- Date of death: 1960 (aged 86–87)
- Position: Centre forward

Senior career*
| Years | Team | Apps | (Gls) |
| 1891–1892 | Abercorn | | |
| 1892–1893 | St Mirren | | |
| 1893–1894 | Preston North End | 2 | (0) |
| 1894–1898 | Bury | 109 | (38) |
| 1898–1899 | Reading | | |
| 1899–1901 | The Wednesday | 32 | (16) |
| 1901–1902 | Queens Park Rangers | 27 | (12) |
| 1902-1903 | Kilbarchan | | |
| Total | | 143 | (66) |
- * Club domestic league appearances and goals

Harry Millar (5 August 1873 – 1960) was a Scottish footballer who played in the Football League for Bury, Preston North End and The Wednesday as a centre forward.

== Career ==
Born in Paisley, Millar started his senior career in 1891 playing for Abercorn, joining St Mirren later the same year. He came south to join Preston North End early in 1894 making his Football League debut at Nottingham Forest that March, but played just twice before the season end. During the close season he joined Bury, scoring on his debut in a 4–2 win over Manchester City that September, striking four times in his first three matches and scoring 19 goals during the season as Bury won the Second Division title. Millar recorded Bury's very first 4 goal haul on 20th October 1894 during a 5–1 victory away at Crewe Alexandra. He achieved the feat twice, notching a four goal haul during the Shakers record score, a 12–1 FA Cup 2nd Round victory over Stockton on 13 February 1897.

His four seasons at Gigg Lane yielded 47 goals in 119 appearances for The Shakers, before he joined Southern League side Reading in 1898, playing a single season for The Royals before returning to The Football League with The Wednesday, who had been relegated the previous season. His 14 goals in 30 appearances helped The Wednesday to the Second Division title in 1900, but he only made 4 appearances for the first team back in the top flight, scoring twice, before returning to the Southern League with Queens Park Rangers in the 1901 close season, where he was the club's leading goalscorer with 12 goals in 1901-02 (scoring 4 goals in an Fa Cup tie), and with whom he finished his senior football career.

== Career statistics ==
| Club | Season | League | | | FA Cup | | Total | |
| Club | Season | Division | Apps | Goals | Apps | Goals | Apps | Goals |
|---|---|---|---|---|---|---|---|---|
| Preston North End | 1893–94 | First Division | 2 | 0 | 0 | 0 | 2 | 0 |
| Bury | 1894–95 | Second Division | 28 | 17 | 2 | 1 | 30 | 18 |
| Bury | 1895–96 | First Division | 25 | 4 | 3 | 3 | 28 | 7 |
| Bury | 1896–97 | First Division | 29 | 11 | 3 | 4 | 32 | 15 |
| Bury | 1897–98 | First Division | 27 | 6 | 1 | 0 | 28 | 6 |
| The Wednesday | 1899–1900 | Second Division | 28 | 14 | 2 | 0 | 30 | 14 |
| The Wednesday | 1900–01 | First Division | 4 | 2 | 0 | 0 | 4 | 2 |
| Career Total | | | 143 | 54 | 11 | 8 | 151 | 62 |
