= Charlie Ditchfield =

English footballer (1870–1947)

Personal information
- Full name: John Charles Ditchfield
- Date of birth: 10 July 1870
- Place of birth: Lichfield, England
- Date of death: 24 April 1947
- Place of death: Worcester, Worcestershire, England
- Position: Full back

Senior career*
Years	Team	Apps	(Gls)
1887–1888	Lichfield St Chad's		
1888–1889	Rifle Brigade		
1889	Winchester		
1889	Winchester Rovers		
1889	Winchester Town		
1890	Ulster		
1891	Glenthorn		
1892–1893	Accrington	29	(0)
1893–1895	Rossendale		
1895–1897	Manchester City	12	(1)
- * Club domestic league appearances and goals

John Charles Ditchfield (10 July 1870 – 24 April 1947) was an English footballer who played in the Football League for Accrington and Manchester City.
