= Marketing accountability =

Metrics linking marketing actions to outcomes

Marketing accountability is a term that signifies management with data that is understandable to the management of the enterprise. "Accountable Marketing" is another name that can be given to this process.

== Overview ==
Within marketing accountability the expression “integrated marketing communications” (IMC) implies that marketing and communications are integrated within the business and management of the enterprise, not as a stand-alone functional silo. Analogous to other business functions like manufacturing and sales, accountable marketing is based on a set of valid outcome performance indicators and the associated activity input costs. Outcome performance indicators are called Effectiveness Metrics; Effectiveness combined with costs is called Efficiency (effectiveness per dollar spent).

According to the Common Language Marketing Dictionary, Marketing accountability refers to the use of metrics to link a firm's marketing actions to financially relevant outcomes and growth over time. This accountability allows marketing to take responsibility for the profit or loss from investments in marketing activities, and to demonstrate the financial contributions of specific marketing programs to the overall financial objectives of the firm, including brand asset value. Return on marketing investment (ROMI), customer acquisition costs, and retention rates are examples of commonly employed marketing accountability metrics.

Marketing Accountability was the subject of a report published in 1997 by Financial Times Management Reports It investigated a widespread problem that consultants McKinsey & Co. had described as "marketing's mid life crisis".

Recent research by the Forbes CMO Practice and the Marketing Accountability Standards Board shows CMO are under growing pressure to show returns on rising investments in marketing assets, new media, data, analytics and technology needed to compete for digitally enabled customers. The complexity of marketing accountability has growth as marketers must add many more investments to the marketing portfolio to adapt to changing customer preferences and compete effectively for market share. According to Forbes research, the CMO of the average Global 5000 company must now allocate resources across at least 20 primary investment types in their annual budget.

== Methodology ==
In order for indicators to be considered valid for accountability, they must meet a few minimum requirements. They need to measure marketing outcomes from the consumers’ point of view, they need to include all marketing activities, they must be repeated over time, and they must meet statistical and technical criteria required of all measurement systems.

The measurements need to be true outcome indicators. Unlike sales where the outcome is easily quantifiable, marketing is more difficult to define: there is not a direct, fast-acting relationship between marketing activities and sales. Some marketing materials are designed to inform, others attempt to portray the product or service attractively, yet others attempt to influence purchasing behavior. Most marketing campaigns include all three orientations; a brand may have glossy ads to boost attractiveness, brochures to convey information, and coupons with expiration dates to stimulate purchases. Thus a multiplicity of channels and contacts that influence target consumers needs to be measured together in order to understand the overall effect, and the separate effectiveness of the programs. The outcome indicator can be called “Brand Experience”, and only consumers can discern the resultant brand experience in the clutter of the marketplace as each message competes with others for attention.

To assure meaningful comparisons among activities, brands, markets, and points in time; the metrics must use a common scale—a “common currency”. This is quite obvious in accounting systems for multinational corporations, but in marketing all too often this principle is ignored. Different communications activities are evaluated using different measurements. These methods fall short of accountability in that the activities cannot be compared directly and their synergies cannot be discerned. Only measurement systems that use common units – to evaluate each contact, each market, and each competitor — can result in marketing accountability.

Marketing activity outcomes must be gathered on a continuous basis in time. While a single reading may provide some insight into the condition before marketing begins, accountability comes from understanding cause and effect. This knowledge comes from repeated examinations over time that show changes from marketing initiatives (from brand and competition) and the evolution of consumers’ needs. Harold Geneen in his groundbreaking book “Managing” explains the role of an effective CEO: to repeatedly evaluate performance numbers on a continuous basis. Only long term observation brings true insight of unanticipated changes and “red flags” in the data.

All measurement systems are prone to misinterpretation and error. Together these form the science of metrology. Measurement accuracy, repeatability, reproducibility, bias, data shifts, and data drifts are only a few common issues identified in measurement, and any useful system must be evaluated from the technical point of view to assure that it addresses these criteria. It is essential that measurement error is quantified so that managers react to changes in conditions, but not changes due to measurement variation. At the very least, all measurements need to show statistical confidence intervals or so-called “error bars”. Independent organizations like the Advertising Research Foundation evaluate the validity of commonly used measurement systems.

These outcome indicators, representing the condition in the marketplace, are combined with financial data to show efficiency of the marketing process. The financials are inputs: dollars spent for marketing activities. The best and most informative systems use Activity based costing (ABC) that track costs by each marketing activity, rather than traditional cost accounting by salaries, facilities, equipment, and materials. ABC methods have the best fidelity as they show contribution efficiency (Brand Experience/$ spent) of each activity, and they may be summed in desired combinations (or campaigns). Understanding competitors costs and brand experience can lead to benchmarking, a comparison to what is considered the best in class.
