= Bob Shaw (footballer) =

Scottish footballer

Personal information
- Full name: Robert Shaw
- Date of birth: 1870
- Place of birth: Paisley, Scotland
- Position: Wing half

Senior career*
Years	Team	Apps	(Gls)
1887–1888	Abercorn		
1888–1893	Stockton		
1893–1896	Darwen	70	(6)
Total		70	(6)
- * Club domestic league appearances and goals

Robert Shaw (1870–unknown) was a Scottish footballer who played in the Football League for Darwen.
