= Harry Rose (footballer) =

English footballer

Hajjy Rose
Personal information
- Full name: Thomas Harry Rose
- Date of birth: 1870
- Place of birth: Mutford, England
- Date of death: 17 October 1946 (aged 75–76)
- Position: Winger

Senior career*
Years	Team	Apps	(Gls)
1892–1895	Grimsby Town	31	(7)
1895	Grimsby All Saints		
1895–1896	Grimsby Town	3	(0)
1896–189?	Grimsby All Saints		
- * Club domestic league appearances and goals

Thomas Harry Rose (1870 – 17 October 1946) was an English professional footballer who played as a winger.
