= Sandy Rowan =

Scottish footballer

Personal information
- Full name: Alexander Rowan
- Date of birth: 5 October 1867
- Place of birth: Cambusnethan, Scotland
- Position: Centre forward

Senior career*
Years	Team	Apps	(Gls)
1889–1890	Albion Rovers		
1890–1891	Nottingham Forest		
1891–1892	Albion Rovers		
1892–1893	The Wednesday	29	(12)
1893–1894	Burton Swifts	17	(9)
1894–1896	Manchester City	45	(23)
Total		91	(44)
- * Club domestic league appearances and goals

Alexander Rowan (5 October 1867–unknown) was a Scottish footballer who played in the Football League for Burton Swifts, Manchester City and The Wednesday.
