= Barney Lee =

Scottish footballer

Personal information
- Full name: Bernard James Lee
- Date of birth: 5 March 1873
- Place of birth: Alloa, Scotland
- Positions: Inside right; outside right

Senior career*
Years	Team	Apps	(Gls)
1893–1894	Leith Athletic		
1894–1896	Bury	23	(11)
1896–1897	Newcastle United	0	(0)
1897–1899	Nelson		
1899–1900	Bo'ness		
1900–1902	King's Park		
1902–1903	Brighton & Hove Albion		
- Broxburn
- * Club domestic league appearances and goals

Bernard James Lee was a Scottish professional footballer who played as a forward in the Football League for Bury and in the Scottish League for Leith Athletic.

== Personal life ==
Lee served as a private in the Royal Scots during the First World War.

== Career statistics ==
Appearances and goals by club, season and competition
Club	Season	League			National Cup		Total	
Club	Season	Division	Apps	Goals	Apps	Goals	Apps	Goals
Leith Athletic	1893–94	Scottish First Division	13	3	2	0	15	3
Leith Athletic	1894–95	Scottish First Division	2	1	0	0	2	1
Career total			15	4	2	0	17	4

== Honours ==
Bury

- Football League Second Division: 1895–96
