= Walter Bowman (soccer) =

Canadian soccer player (1870–1948)

Personal information
- Full name: Walter Wells Bowman
- Date of birth: August 11, 1870
- Place of birth: Waterloo, Ontario, Canada
- Date of death: March 7, 1948 (aged 77)
- Place of death: Seattle, Washington, U.S.
- Position: Outside right

Senior career*
| Years | Team | Apps | (Gls) |
| 1887–1889 | Berlin (Ontario) Rangers | | |
| 1892–1893 | Accrington | 5 | (3) |
| 1893–1899 | Manchester City | 47 | (3) |

International career
- Canada
- * Club domestic league appearances and goals

Walter Wells Bowman (August 11, 1870 – March 7, 1948) was a Canadian soccer player who played as an outside right. He was the first non-British player to play in the Football League.
