= Tommy Little (footballer, born 1872) =

Scottish footballer

Personal information
- Full name: Thomas Little
- Date of birth: 22 June 1872
- Place of birth: Durisdeer, Scotland
- Position: Inside forward

Senior career*
Years	Team	Apps	(Gls)
1891–1892	Nithsdale Wanderers		
1892–1894	Derby County	16	(1)
1894	Ardwick	7	(3)
1894	Baltimore Orioles		
1895	Manchester City	9	(2)
1895	Ashton North End		
1896	Wellingborough		
1897–1898	Luton Town	22	(9)
1898	Swindon Town		
1899	Barnsley	14	(2)
1900	Dumfries		
Total		68	(17)
- * Club domestic league appearances and goals

Thomas Little (22 June 1872–unknown) was a Scottish footballer who played in the Football League for Barnsley, Derby County, Luton Town and Manchester City.
