= Pat Finnerhan =

English footballer (1872–1941)

Patrick Finnerhan (March 1872 – 1941) was an English professional footballer who played as a forward for Northwich Victoria, Manchester City, Liverpool and Bristol City.

Finnerhan signed for Northwich in 1891. Northwich lost their Football League status in 1894, and Finnerhan joined Manchester City in the close season. He made his Manchester City debut in the opening match of the 1894-95 season, a 4-2 Second Division defeat to Bury. He scored his first goal for the club on 8 September 1894 against Burslem Port Vale. He played in every Manchester City match that season, finishing as the club's leading scorer with 15 goals. In October 1894 Manchester City signed Finnerhan's former Northwich strike partner Billy Meredith.

In March 1897, having made 89 appearances for Manchester City, Finnerhan transferred to Liverpool. He made eight appearances for Liverpool, scoring one goal, against Wolverhampton Wanderers. He then moved to Bristol City of the Southern League.
