= James McBride (footballer) =

Scottish footballer (1873–1899)

Personal information
- Date of birth: 30 December 1873
- Place of birth: Renton, Scotland
- Date of death: 25 May 1899 (aged 25)
- Place of death: Manchester, England
- Position: Left half

Youth career
- 1889–1890: Renton Wanderers

Senior career*
Years	Team	Apps	(Gls)
1890–1892	Renton	22	(1)
1892–1894	Liverpool	50	(7)
1894–1897	Manchester City	70	(1)
1897–1898	Ashton North End		

International career
1892	Scottish League XI	1	(0)
- * Club domestic league appearances and goals

James McBride (30 December 1873 – 25 May 1899) was a Scottish footballer, who played for Liverpool during the latter half of the 19th century.

== Life and playing career ==
Born in Renton, Dunbartonshire, Scotland, McBride played for Renton Wanderers and Renton before being signed by Liverpool managers John McKenna and William Edward Barclay in 1892, a short time after he took part in a trial for the Scotland national team and made his sole appearance for the Scottish Football League XI (in the first fixture they played). McBride made his debut in Liverpool's first ever fixture, a friendly against Rotherham Town on 1 September 1892, which Liverpool won 7–1. He also played in their first ever competitive match, a Lancashire League fixture against Higher Walton two days later. He scored his first goal for Liverpool in this game, which the team won 8–0.

McBride was a regular during Liverpool's unbeaten debut season in the Football League Second Division, missing just 4 of the 28 games. Liverpool gained promotion to the top flight of English football, replacing Newton Heath by winning 2–0 in a test (play-off) match. He only played five more times for the Anfield club during their relegation back down to the lower level.

== Honors ==
Liverpool

- Football League Second Division (1894)
