= Ike Brookes =

English footballer (1861–1935)

Personal information
- Full name: Isaac Brookes
- Date of birth: 7 January 1861
- Place of birth: Bilston, England
- Date of death: 1935 (aged 73–74)
- Position: Goalkeeper

Senior career*
Years	Team	Apps	(Gls)
1891–1892	Stoke	14	(0)
1892–1893	Northwich Victoria	6	(0)
Total		20	(0)
- * Club domestic league appearances and goals

Isaac Brookes (7 January 1861 – 1935) was an English footballer who played in the Football League for Northwich Victoria and Stoke.

== Career ==
Brookes was born in Bilston and was a wicket-keeper for the Staffordshire County Cricket Club. In 1891 Stoke were suffering from a goalkeeper crisis with both Bill Rowley and Wilf Merritt out with injuries and Brookes was signed by the club. He did well as Stoke remained unbeaten and claimed the Football Alliance title and with it an instant return to the Football League. He remained at Stoke but lost his place once Rowley had recovered and Brookes joined Northwich Victoria.

== Career statistics ==
Club	Season	League			FA Cup		Total	
Club	Season	Division	Apps	Goals	Apps	Goals	Apps	Goals
Stoke	1890–91	Football Alliance	12	0	3	0	15	0
Stoke	1891–92	The Football League	2	0	0	0	2	0
Stoke	Total		14	0	3	0	17	0
Northwich Victoria	1893–94	Second Division	6	0	0	0	6	0
Career Total			20	0	3	0	23	0

== Honours ==
with Stoke

- Football Alliance champions: 1890–91
