= Arthur Reeves (football manager) =

English footballer and manager

Personal information
- Full name: Arthur Reeves
- Date of birth: c. 1837
- Place of birth: Stoke-upon-Trent, England
- Date of death: 1915 (aged 77–78)

Managerial career
- Years: Team
- 1892–1895: Stoke

Arthur Reeves (c. 1837 – 1915) was an English football manager who managed Stoke.

== Career ==
Reeves was born in Stoke-upon-Trent and took over as manager of Stoke in January 1892 from the departed Joseph Bradshaw. After four months in charge Reeves knew he had a lot of work to do as Stoke finished next to bottom of the First Division in 1891–92. But after a lot of hard work and a lot of effort on Reeves' part, the players responded and at the end of the next campaign Stoke claimed a welcome mid-table position. Reeves' gambled blending local born stars like Bill Rowley, Tommy Clare and Alf Underwood with Scottish imports Davy Brodie, Davy Christie and Billy Dickson a combination that initially worked well. After an 11th-place finish in 1893–94 Stoke had a tough 1894–95 season which saw them enter the end of season test match to remain in the top-flight, they beat Newton Heath 3–0 to see them safe. It was not enough to keep Reeves in charge of Stoke and he was replaced by the club's goalkeeper, Bill Rowley.

== Career statistics ==
Managerial record by club and tenure
Team	From	To	Record				
Team	From	To	P	W	D	L	Win %
Stoke	January 1892	May 1895	96	37	14	45	38.5
Total			96	37	14	45	38.5
