= Hughie (name) =

Hughie is a masculine given name and nickname (usually of the given name Hugh). People named Hughie include:

== People with the given name ==
- Hughie Charles (1907–1995), English songwriter, co-writer of "We'll Meet Again" and "There'll Always Be an England"
- Hughie Edwards (1914–1982), Royal Air Force air commodore, Governor of Western Australia and Australian recipient of the Victoria Cross
- Hughie Flint (born 1941), English drummer
- Hughie Fury (born 1994), British boxer
- Hughie Hay (c. 1932–2012), Scottish footballer
- Hughie Hughes (c. 1885–1916), British racecar driver
- Hughie Lee-Smith (1915–1999), American artist and teacher
- Hughie Mack (1884–1927), American silent film actor
- Hughie McElvaney (1949–2025), Irish businessman and politician
- Hughie McPherson (1918–2013), Australian rules footballer
- Hughie Mulligan (died 1973), New York mobster and bookmaker
- Hughie O'Donoghue (born 1953), British painter
- Hughie Odgers (1889–1958), Australian rules footballer
- Hughie Webb (1878–1958), Australian rules footballer
- Hughie Williams (1933–2017), Australian trade unionist and Olympic wrestler
- Hughie Wilson (1869–1940), Scottish footballer

== People with the nickname ==
- Hugh Adcock (1903–1975), English footballer
- Hughie Callan (1881–1917), Australian rules footballer
- Hughie Cannon (1877–1912), American composer and lyricist who wrote "Won't You Come Home Bill Bailey"
- Hughie Carroll (1885–1965), Australian cricketer
- Hughie Clifford (1866–1929), Scottish footballer
- Hughie Critz (1900–1980), American Major League Baseball player
- Hughie Dickson (1895–1965), English footballer
- Hughie Dow (1906–1987), English footballer
- Hughie Dunn (1875 or 1878–?) Scottish footballer
- Hughie Ferguson (1898–1930), Scottish footballer
- Hughie Gallacher (1903–1957), Scottish footballer
- Hugh Gallacher (footballer, born 1930) (1930–2013), Scottish footballer
- Hughie Green (1920–1997), English television presenter
- Hughie Hearne (1873–1932), American Major League Baseball catcher
- Hugh James (footballer) (1890–1967), Australian rules footballer
- Hughie Jennings (1869–1928), American Major League Baseball player and manager
- Hughie Jones (1927–2016), Anglican Archdeacon of Loughborough from 1986 to 1992
- Hughie Kelly (1923–2009), Scottish football player and manager
- Hughie Lehman (1885–1961), Canadian National Hockey League goaltender and head coach
- Hughie McAlees (1879–1964), Australian politician
- Hughie McIlmoyle (born 1940), Scottish retired footballer
- Hughie Miller (1886–1945), American Major League Baseball player
- Hugh Morrow (footballer), English footballer in the 1940s and '50s and manager (1967–1971)
- Hughie O'Reilly (1904–1976), Gaelic footballer and manager
- Hughie Phillips (1864–?), English footballer
- Hughie Reed (1950–1992), Scottish footballer
- Hughie Russell (1921–1991), English footballer
- Hughie Thomasson, Jr. (1952–2007), American guitarist and singer
- Hugh Turner (footballer, born 1904), English former football goalkeeper

== See also ==
- "Hughie Graham", title character of ballad
- Huey (disambiguation)
