= 1890–91 Stoke F.C. season =

Stoke
1890–91 season
- Chairman: Mr S. Barker
- Manager: Joseph Bradshaw
- Stadium: Victoria Ground
- Football Alliance: 1st (33 Points)
- FA Cup: Third Round
- Top goalscorer: League: Alf Edge (12); All: Alf Edge & Wilmot Turner (12)
- Highest home attendance: 4,000 vs Walsall Town Swifts (11 October 1890)
- Lowest home attendance: 1,000 vs Crewe Alexandra (8 November 1890)
- Average home league attendance: 2,136
Home colours

The 1890–91 season was Stoke's only season in the Football Alliance.

Stoke played their only season in the Football Alliance which they won the title and were re-elected back into the Football League at the end of the season. Stoke found life much easier in the Alliance and lost just twice as they ended up with 33 points and their first league title.

== Season review ==
=== League ===
For the 1890–91 season Stoke joined the Football Alliance which comprised 12 teams made up from the Midlands and the North. This was very much the secondary competition to the Football League and while Stoke had struggled in their two previous seasons, they quickly came to grips with life in the Alliance and finished as champions. Stoke only lost two matches all season and were re-elected back into the Football League. Both defeats came in Birmingham, 5–2 at St George's and 5–1 at Small Heath and in both games they had their goalkeeper (Bill Rowley and Wilf Merritt respectively) carried off due to injury. With no reserve 'keepers available for the following fixtures Stoke resorted to utilising two outfield players, Hughie Phillips v Crewe Alexandra and Alf Underwood v Bootle in goal. Eventually Ike Brookes the Staffordshire County cricket wicket-keeper was signed for the rest of the season and played in the last 12 matches where Stoke remained unbeaten to claim the title.

=== FA Cup ===
While out of the Football League, Stoke played a major part in the formation of the penalty kick when, in February 1891 they were knocked out of the FA Cup in the third round by Notts County 1–0 after two previous 3–0 victory's over Preston North End and Aston Villa. With time running out and Stoke pressing forward for an equalizer, Notts County's defender Jack Hendry handled in the area so the referee gave a free kick to Stoke. Notts County put all eleven men on the line and Stoke failed to score. This same referee, who recognised what an unjust event had occurred later became a football legislator and it was he who introduced the penalty kick to the Football League and FA Cup competitions for the 1891–92 season.

== Final league table ==
Pos	Team	Pld	W	D	L	GF	GA	GAv	Pts	Qualification or relegation
1	Stoke (Note: New club in the Alliance) (E)	22	13	7	2	57	39	1.462	33	Football Alliance Champions, elected to Football League
2	Sunderland Albion (Note: Left to join the Northern League)	22	12	6	4	69	28	2.464	30	Left to join the Northern League
3	Grimsby Town	22	11	5	6	43	27	1.593	27	
4	Birmingham St George's	22	12	2	8	64	62	1.032	26	
5	Nottingham Forest	22	9	7	6	66	39	1.692	23 (Note: Two points deducted for fielding an unregistered player)	

Rules for classification: 1) points; 2) goal average.
(E) Elected to the Football League

== Results ==
Stoke's score comes first

=== Legend ===
Win	Draw	Loss

=== Football Alliance ===
Match	Date	Opponent	Venue	Result	Attendance	Scorers
1	13 September 1890	Birmingham St George's	H	6–3	1,500	Ballham, Baker (4), Turner
2	20 September 1890	Grimsby Town	H	2–1	2,000	Edge, Coupar
3	27 September 1890	Newton Heath	H	2–1	2,000	Edge, Dunn
4	3 October 1890	Nottingham Forest	A	2–2	2,000	Turner, Baker
5	4 October 1890	Grimsby Town	A	1–1	2,000	Baker
6	11 October 1890	Walsall Town Swifts	H	1–0	4,000	Baker
7	18 October 1890	Birmingham St George's	A	2–5	2,000	Edge, Turner
8	1 November 1890	Small Heath	A	1–5	2,500	Edge
9	8 November 1890	Crewe Alexandra	H	2–2	1,000	Turner, Dunn
10	15 November 1890	Bootle	H	2–1	1,500	Dunn (2)
11	22 November 1890	Sunderland Albion	A	1–1	1,500	Dunn
12	29 November 1890	Nottingham Forest	H	2–1	2,000	Dunn, Ballham
13	6 December 1890	Bootle	A	2–2	1,000	Dunn, Baker
14	13 December 1890	The Wednesday	A	4–2	6,000	Dunn, Baker (2), Edge
15	26 December 1890	Darwen	H	6–2	3,000	Baker, Edge (2), Ballham, Turner (2)
16	27 December 1890	Small Heath	H	4–2	3,000	Edge, Ballham, Turner (2)
17	3 January 1891	Sunderland Albion	H	1–1	2,000	Naughton
18	5 January 1891	Newton Heath	A	1–0	2,000	Turner
19	24 January 1891	Crewe Alexandra	A	4–2	1,500	Coupar, Dunn, Ballham, Clifford
20	7 March 1891	Walsall Town Swifts	A	3–1	4,000	Edge (2), Turner
21	21 March 1891	Darwen	A	3–3	1,000	Edge, Turner, Dunn
22	4 April 1891	The Wednesday	H	5–1	1,500	Edge, Naughton, Dunn, Christie, Ballham

=== FA Cup ===
Round	Date	Opponent	Venue	Result	Attendance	Scorers
R1	17 January 1891	Preston North End	H	3–0	8,000	Ballham, Coupar, Turner
R2	31 January 1891	Aston Villa	H	3–0	7,000	Ballham (2), Coupar
R3	14 February 1891	Notts County	A	0–1	16,000	

== Squad statistics ==
Pos.	Name	League		FA Cup		Total	
Pos.	Name	Apps	Goals	Apps	Goals	Apps	Goals
GK	(England) Ike Brookes	12	0	3	0	15	0
GK	(England) Wilf Merritt	2	0	0	0	2	0
GK	(England) Bill Rowley	6	0	0	0	6	0
FB	(England) George Bateman	1	0	0	0	1	0
FB	(England) Tommy Clare	22	0	3	0	25	0
FB	(England) Jack Eccles	1	0	0	0	1	0
FB	(England) Alf Underwood	21	0	3	0	24	0
HB	(Scotland) Davy Brodie	22	0	3	0	25	0
HB	(Scotland) Davy Christie	22	1	3	0	25	1
HB	(Scotland) Hughie Clifford	17	1	3	0	20	1
HB	(Scotland) Hughie Phillips	7	0	0	0	7	0
FW	(England) Charlie Baker	17	11	0	0	17	11
FW	(England) Lewis Ballham	20	6	3	3	23	9
FW	(Scotland) Peter Coupar	3	2	3	2	6	4
FW	(Scotland) Billy Dunn	21	11	3	0	24	11
FW	(England) Alf Edge	22	12	3	0	25	12
FW	(Scotland) Willie Naughton	6	2	0	0	6	2
FW	(England) Wilmot Turner	20	11	3	1	23	12
