= Alf Edge =

English footballer (1864-1941)

Personal information
- Full name: Alfred Edge
- Date of birth: 5 November 1864
- Place of birth: Stone, Staffordshire, England
- Date of death: 11 April 1941 (aged 76)
- Position: Inside forward

Senior career*
| Years | Team | Apps | (Gls) |
| 1884 | Goldenhill Wanderers | | |
| 1885–1891 | Stoke | 52 | (16) |
| 1891–1892 | Newton Heath | 19 | (7) |
| 1892 | Nottingham Jardines Athletic | | |
| 1892–1893 | Stoke | 1 | (1) |
| 1893–1894 | Northwich Victoria | 3 | (0) |
| 1894 | Ardwick | 1 | (0) |
| 1894 | Macclesfield | 4 | (2) |
| Total | | 80 | (26) |

International career
| 1891 | Football Alliance XI | 1 | (0) |
- * Club domestic league appearances and goals

Alfred Edge (5 November 1864 – 11 April 1941) was an English footballer. His regular position was as a forward. He played for Stoke, Newton Heath, Northwich Victoria and Ardwick

== Career ==
Edge was born in Stone, Staffordshire, and played for a Staffordshire side Goldenhill Wanderers before joining Stoke in 1885. He became a useful forward for Stoke and scored five goals in a 10–1 win over Caernarfon Wanderers in the FA Cup during the 1886–87 season. He was a member of the Stoke squad in their first two seasons in the Football League. He made his League debut on 8 September 1888, as a forward for Stoke in a 2–0 defeat by West Bromwich Albion at the Victoria Ground. His debut League goal was scored on 1 December 1888 in a 2–1 victory against Blackburn Rovers. In 1889–90 he played 19 of the 22 League matches played by Stoke scoring three goals. Like the rest of the team Edge struggled in the first two seasons, Stoke failed to gain re-election and joined the Football Alliance. Stoke were much more successful as they finished as champions of the Alliance with Edge scoring 12 goals.

Stoke re-gained their place in the Football League but Edge stayed in the Alliance signing for Manchester based Newton Heath. Whilst at Newton Heath he was suspended by the FA for also playing for Nottingham Jardines Athletic. His ban was lifted after an investigation and he re-joined Stoke in 1892. He played one match for Stoke which came in a 7–1 victory against his old club Newton Heath. He later went on to play for Northwich Victoria, Ardwick and finished his football career with Macclesfield.

== Style of play ==
In one source described as an exceptionally fine footballer; a versatile forward with loads of skill quick over short distances and who never gave up the ghost.

== Career statistics ==
Appearances and goals by club, season and competition
| Club | Season | League | | | FA Cup | | Total | |
| Club | Season | Division | Apps | Goals | Apps | Goals | Apps | Goals |
|---|---|---|---|---|---|---|---|---|
| Stoke | 1885–86 | — | — | | 2 | 0 | 2 | 0 |
| Stoke | 1886–87 | — | — | | 2 | 6 | 2 | 6 |
| Stoke | 1887–88 | — | — | | 4 | 2 | 4 | 2 |
| Stoke | 1888–89 | Football League | 19 | 3 | 1 | 0 | 20 | 3 |
| Stoke | 1889–90 | Football League | 11 | 1 | 4 | 3 | 15 | 4 |
| Stoke | 1890–91 | Football Alliance | 22 | 12 | 3 | 0 | 25 | 12 |
| Stoke | Total | | 52 | 16 | 16 | 11 | 68 | 27 |
| Newton Heath | 1891–92 | Football Alliance | 19 | 7 | 3 | 3 | 22 | 10 |
| Stoke | 1892–93 | First Division | 1 | 1 | 0 | 0 | 1 | 1 |
| Northwich Victoria | 1893–94 | Second Division | 3 | 0 | 0 | 0 | 3 | 0 |
| Ardwick | 1893–94 | Second Division | 1 | 0 | 0 | 0 | 1 | 0 |
| Macclesfield | 1893–94 | The Combination | 4 | 2 | 0 | 0 | 4 | 2 |
| Career Total | | | 80 | 26 | 19 | 14 | 99 | 40 |

== Honours ==
Stoke

- Football Alliance: 1890–91
