= Bob Ramsay (footballer) =

English footballer

Personal information
- Full name: Daniel Robertson Ramsay
- Date of birth: 1864
- Place of birth: West Derby, Liverpool, England
- Date of death: before 1945
- Position: Full-back

Senior career*
Years	Team	Apps	(Gls)
1886–1888	Burslem Port Vale	0	(0)
1888–1890	Stoke	43	(4)
1890–1891	Newton Heath		
1891–1892	West Manchester		
1892–1893	Northwich Victoria	29	(4)
1893–1894	Burslem Port Vale	16	(0)
Total		88	(8)
- * Club domestic league appearances and goals

Daniel Robertson Ramsay (1864 – before 1945) was an English professional footballer who played in the English Football League for Stoke, Northwich Victoria and Burslem Port Vale. He played in Stoke's first ever Football league team.

== Career ==
=== Stoke ===
Ramsay joined Burslem Port Vale in April 1886 and played regular football until moving to Stoke in August 1888. He made his first-team debut on 8 September 1888, at wing-half for Stoke in a 2–0 defeat by West Bromwich Albion at the Victoria Ground. After going 21 games without scoring in 1888–89, as the "Potters" finished bottom of the English Football League in the first ever season of the competition, he scored the club's first league hat-trick in a 7–1 win over Accrington at the Victoria Ground. He scored a total of five goals in 26 appearances in 1889–90, having hit the net against Burnley and Old Westminsters.

=== Later career ===
He then played for Newton Heath and West Manchester, before joining Northwich Victoria in 1892. He scored three goals in 27 appearances across the 1892–93 season, and then two goals in eight games as Northwich were relegated out of the Second Division at the end of the 1893–94 season. He rejoined Burslem Port Vale in October 1893. He was a first-team player but was limited to 16 Second Division appearances in 1893–94 because his knee kept going out of joint, and he was released in May 1894.

== Career statistics ==
Appearances and goals by club, season and competition
Club	Season	League			FA Cup		Total	
Club	Season	Division	Apps	Goals	Apps	Goals	Apps	Goals
Stoke	1888–89	Football League	21	0	0	0	21	0
Stoke	1889–90	Football League	22	4	4	1	26	5
Stoke	Total		43	4	4	1	47	5
Northwich Victoria	1892–93	Second Division	21	2	6	1	27	3
Northwich Victoria	1893–94	Second Division	8	2	0	0	8	2
Northwich Victoria	Total		29	4	6	1	35	5
Burslem Port Vale	1893–94	Second Division	16	0	0	0	16	0
Career total			88	8	10	2	98	10
