= 1889–90 Stoke F.C. season =

Stoke
1889–90 season
- Chairman: Mr S.Barker
- Manager: Harry Lockett
- Stadium: Victoria Ground
- Football League: 12th (10 Points)
- FA Cup: Third Round
- Top goalscorer: League: Bob Ramsay & Freddie Gee (4); All: Bob Ramsay & Freddie Gee (5)
- Highest home attendance: 5,500 vs Preston North End (11 November 1889)
- Lowest home attendance: 1,500 vs Everton (9 November 1889)
- Average home league attendance: 3,275
Home colours

The 1889–90 season was Stoke's second season in the Football League.

It was another poor season for Stoke, as they again finished bottom of the Football League but this time they failed to gain re-election and their place was taken by Sunderland and Stoke joined the Football Alliance for the following season. Stoke's worst league and FA Cup defeat came during the 1889–90 season, a 10–0 reverse against Preston North End and an 8–0 cup defeat to Wolverhampton Wanderers. Stoke won just three matches all season and picked up just ten points making it the club's worst performance in league football.

== Season review ==
=== League ===
After finishing bottom of the league last season Stoke failed to improve a great deal in the 1889–90 season and again took the wooden spoon. They were humiliated 10–0 in the second match of the season away at Preston North End where all the goals were scored by Scottish internationals as Stoke suffered their worst league defeat. Stoke also lost 8–0 away to both Everton and Blackburn Rovers and they also suffered a 6–1 reverse against Aston Villa. Stoke were awful throughout the season and went on a ten match losing streak stretching from 19 October 1889 to 4 January 1890. In a tough home fixture against Burnley just before Christmas, Bob McCormick, the Stoke inside-right, badly injured his collar bone in a challenge with the Burnley full-back and at the end of the match some supporters invaded the pitch and confronted the "Clarets" defender. Stoke won the match 2–1 but Burnley lodged an appeal claiming their players had been intimidated. The League decided in Burnley's favour and ordered the match to be replayed, this time Burnley won 4–3.

Stoke won only three matches this season and amassed a mere ten points three fewer than Burnley and 23 behind champions, for the second season running Preston. Stoke failed to gain re-election and the end of the season and their place was taken by Sunderland. Stoke joined the Football Alliance for the 1890–91 season. A 7–1 victory over Accrington where Bob Ramsay scored the "Potters" first hat-trick was a rare highlight in what was an awful season. At the end of the season manager Harry Lockett left the club to concentrate on his job as secretary of the Football League and Joseph Bradshaw took over.

=== FA Cup ===
In the FA Cup, Stoke knocked out Old Westminsters and Everton but were ousted from the competition by Wolverhampton Wanderers. This third round tie was played on 15 February 1890 in driving sleet and rain on a heavy pitch and Wolves more suited to the conditions easily won the match 4–0. Stoke protested over the state of the pitch and the FA ordered a re-match the following Saturday. This time Wolves doubled the score to 8–0 much to the embarrassment of the Stoke officials. The result is Stoke's worst in the FA Cup.

== Final league table ==
Pos	Team	Pld	W	D	L	GF	GA	GAv	Pts	Relegation
8	Aston Villa	22	7	5	10	43	51	0.843	19	
9	Bolton Wanderers	22	9	1	12	54	65	0.831	19	
10	Notts County	22	6	5	11	43	51	0.843	17	Re-elected
11	Burnley	22	4	5	13	36	65	0.554	13	Re-elected
12	Stoke	22	3	4	15	27	69	0.391	10	Not re-elected

Source: World Football
Rules for classification: 1) Points; 2) Goal average; 3) Goals scored

== Results ==
Stoke's score comes first

=== Legend ===
Win	Draw	Loss

=== Football League ===
Match	Date	Opponent	Venue	Result	Attendance	Scorers
1	7 September 1889	Derby County	H	1–1	4,000	McReddie
2	14 September 1889	Preston North End	A	0–10	7,000	
3	28 September 1889	Wolverhampton Wanderers	H	2–1	5,000	Gee, Coupar
4	5 October 1889	Notts County	A	1–3	3,500	Mudie
5	12 October 1889	Wolverhampton Wanderers	A	2–2	3,800	Coupar, McReddie
6	19 October 1889	Bolton Wanderers	H	0–1	3,500	
7	26 October 1889	Derby County	A	0–2	3,000	
8	2 November 1889	Everton	A	0–8	7,500	
9	9 November 1889	Everton	H	1–2	1,500	McCormick
10	11 November 1889	Preston North End	H	1–2	5,500	McCormick
11	16 November 1889	West Bromwich Albion	H	1–3	3,900	Simpson
12	7 December 1889	Aston Villa	A	1–6	4,000	Hendry
13	23 December 1889	Blackburn Rovers	H	0–3	2,500	
14	28 December 1889	Accrington	A	1–2	1,500	Coupar
15	4 January 1890	Blackburn Rovers	A	0–8	4,000	
16	11 January 1890	Burnley	A	3–1	2,500	Gee, Dunn, Edge
17	8 February 1890	Bolton Wanderers	A	0–5	5,000	
18	1 March 1890	Accrington	H	7–1	2,500	Ramsay (3), Baker (2), Simpson (2)
19	10 March 1890	Burnley	H	3–4	2,000	Ramsay, Christie, Gee
20	15 March 1890	West Bromwich Albion	A	1–2	1,600	Owen
21	17 March 1890	Aston Villa	H	1–1	3,150	Gee
22	24 March 1890	Notts County	H	1–1	2,500	Owen

=== FA Cup ===
Round	Date	Opponent	Venue	Result	Attendance	Scorers
R1	18 January 1890	Old Westminsters	H	3–0	3,000	Gee, Ramsay, Sayer
R2	1 February 1890	Everton	H	4–2	7,000	Edge (3), Dunn
R3	15 February 1890	Wolverhampton Wanderers	A	0–4	7,000	Stoke win appeal
R3	22 February 1890	Wolverhampton Wanderers	A	0–8	7,000	

== Squad statistics ==
Pos.	Name	League		FA Cup		Total	
Pos.	Name	Apps	Goals	Apps	Goals	Apps	Goals
GK	(England) Wilf Merritt	1	0	1	0	2	0
GK	(England) Bill Rowley	21	0	3	0	24	0
FB	(England) Tommy Clare	14	0	4	0	18	0
FB	(England) Jack Eccles	3	0	0	0	3	0
FB	(Wales) Edgar Montford	5	0	0	0	5	0
FB	(England) Alf Underwood	22	0	4	0	26	0
HB	(Scotland) Davy Brodie	11	0	4	0	15	0
HB	(Scotland) Davy Christie	14	1	2	0	16	1
HB	(England) Arthur Dixon	0	0	0	0	0	0
HB	(England) Albert Farmer	3	0	2	0	5	0
HB	(Scotland) Billy Hendry	14	1	0	0	14	1
HB	(England) Bob Ramsay	22	4	4	1	26	5
HB	(England) Elijah Smith	4	0	0	0	4	0
FW	(England) Charlie Baker	12	2	4	0	16	2
FW	(Scotland) Peter Coupar	11	3	0	0	11	3
FW	(Scotland) Billy Dunn	11	1	4	1	15	2
FW	(England) Alf Edge	11	1	4	3	15	4
FW	(England) Freddie Gee	16	4	4	1	20	5
FW	(England) William Locker	1	0	0	0	1	0
FW	(Scotland) Bob McCormick	12	2	0	0	12	2
FW	(Scotland) Wally McReddie	11	2	0	0	11	2
FW	(Scotland) Len Mudie	3	1	0	0	3	1
FW	(England) Jimmy Owen	3	2	0	0	3	2
FW	(England) Jimmy Sayer	7	0	2	1	9	1
FW	(Scotland) Harry Simpson	10	3	2	0	12	3
