= Jesse Stanley =

English footballer

Personal information
- Full name: Jesse Walter Stanley
- Date of birth: 1869
- Place of birth: Stoke-upon-Trent, England
- Date of death: 1933 (aged 63–64)
- Position: Full back

Senior career*
| Years | Team | Apps | (Gls) |
| 1890–1891 | Northwich Victoria | | |
| 1891–1892 | Stoke | 3 | (0) |
| 1892–1893 | Northwich Victoria | 35 | (0) |
- * Club domestic league appearances and goals

Jesse Walter Stanley (1869 – 1933) was an English footballer who played in the Football League for Northwich Victoria and Stoke.

== Career ==
Stanley was born in Stoke-upon-Trent and began his career with Northwich Victoria. In 1891 he joined Stoke where he played in three matches before returning to Northwich.

== Career statistics ==
| Club | Season | League | | | FA Cup | | Total | |
| Club | Season | Division | Apps | Goals | Apps | Goals | Apps | Goals |
|---|---|---|---|---|---|---|---|---|
| Stoke | 1891–92 | The Football League | 3 | 0 | 0 | 0 | 3 | 0 |
| Northwich Victoria | 1892–93 | Second Division | 21 | 0 | 6 | 0 | 27 | 0 |
| Northwich Victoria | 1893–94 | Second Division | 14 | 0 | 0 | 0 | 14 | 0 |
| Career Total | | | 38 | 0 | 6 | 0 | 44 | 0 |
