= Peter Coupar =

Scottish footballer

Personal information
- Full name: Peter Coupar
- Date of birth: 17 October 1866
- Place of birth: Dundee, Scotland
- Date of death: 6 July 1944 (aged 77)
- Place of death: Dundee, Scotland
- Position: Centre forward

Senior career*
Years	Team	Apps	(Gls)
1887	Dundee Wanderers		
1888–1889	Bolton Wanderers	3	(1)
1889	Kidderminster Harriers		
1889–1891	Stoke	14	(5)
1891	Middlesbrough Ironopolis		
Total		17	(6)
- * Club domestic league appearances and goals

Peter Coupar (17 October 1866 – 6 July 1944) was a Scottish footballer who played for in the Football League for Bolton Wanderers and Stoke.

== Career ==
Coupar started his career playing for his local club Dundee Wanderers. In 1888 he moved south of the border to Bolton Wanderers where he played three times in 1888–89 scoring once on 15 September 1888 in a 4–3 defeat against Burnley. He left midway through the campaign for Kidderminster Harriers before returning to the Football League with Stoke. He played eleven times during 1889–90 scoring three goals as the Potters failed to gain re-election and had to join the Football Alliance. Coupar scored two goals in three matches in both league and cup in 1890–91 helping Stoke win the Football Alliance title and regain their league status. He left at the end of the campaign for Northern League side Middlesbrough Ironopolis.

== Career statistics ==
Club	Season	League			FA Cup		Total	
Club	Season	Division	Apps	Goals	Apps	Goals	Apps	Goals
Bolton Wanderers	1888–89	The Football League	3	1	0	0	3	1
Stoke	1889–90	The Football League	11	3	0	0	11	3
Stoke	1890–91	Football Alliance	3	2	3	2	6	4
Career Total			17	6	3	2	20	8

== Honours ==
with Stoke

- Football Alliance champions: 1890–91
