= Wilf Merritt =

English footballer

Personal information
- Full name: Wilfred Merritt
- Date of birth: 1864
- Place of birth: Leek, England
- Position: Goalkeeper

Senior career*
Years	Team	Apps	(Gls)
1887	Leek		
1888–1890	Stoke	4	(0)
1891	Leek		
- * Club domestic league appearances and goals

Wilfred Merritt (1864 – after 1890) was an English footballer who played in the Football League and the Football Alliance for Stoke.

== Career ==
Merritt started his career at his home town club Leek. He joined Stoke in January 1889, during his time at Stoke he was mainly used as a back-up to first choice goalkeeper Bill Rowley. Merritt made just five appearances in his ten months at Stoke before returning to Leek.

== Career statistics ==
Club	Season	League			FA Cup		Total	
Club	Season	Division	Apps	Goals	Apps	Goals	Apps	Goals
Stoke	1888–89	Football League	1	0	0	0	1	0
Stoke	1889–90	Football League	1	0	1	0	2	0
Stoke	1890–91	Football Alliance	2	0	0	0	2	0
Career total			4	0	1	0	5	0

== Honours ==
with Stoke

- Football Alliance champions: 1890–91
