= 1891–92 Stoke F.C. season =

Stoke
1891–92 season
- Chairman: Mr S. Barker
- Manager: Joseph Bradshaw, Arthur Reeves
- Stadium: Victoria Ground
- Football League: 13th (14 Points)
- FA Cup: Third Round
- Top goalscorer: League: Joe Schofield (9); All: Joe Schofield (12)
- Highest home attendance: 7,000 vs Aston Villa (24 October 1891)
- Lowest home attendance: 1,000 vs Sunderland (28 November 1891)
- Average home league attendance: 3,950
Home colours

The 1891–92 season was Stoke's third season in the Football League.

Stoke returned to the Football League after a season in the Football Alliance. Stoke continued to struggle in the more demanding competition and finished in 13th position with 14 points and had to seek re-election for the third time, they were successful in doing gaining more votes than Darwen and Sheffield United.

== Season review ==
=== League ===
Prior to the start of the season Stoke had to ditch their traditional red and white striped kit due to the Football League ruling that only one style of kit can be used by one club and Sunderland were allowed to use red and white. Stoke used amber and black which changed to plain maroon coloured shirts, it took until the 1910s before Stoke could use red and white stripes on a regular basis. The rule was eventually scrapped in 1919.

For the 1891–92 season the Football League was increased from 12 to 14 clubs, Stoke along with Darwen joined the Football League. Despite a bright enough start, Stoke winning 2–1 at home to Derby County, there was a lack of improvement in their overall form and the team quickly dropped down the table. A 9–3 defeat at Darwen, who eventually finished bottom of the league and failed to be re-elected, was the most disappointing performance of a dismal campaign, although Stoke did win 5–1 in the return fixture. Goalkeeper Bill Rowley had now returned from injury and was captain of the side, while Arthur Reeves replaced Joseph Bradshaw as manager in January 1892. Re-election was again sought and duly achieved beating Sheffield United by one vote. They instead joined the newly formed Second Division for the 1892–93 season. Left-winger Joe Schofield made his debut for Stoke against Burnley on 10 October 1891. Schofield would go on to become one of Stoke's greatest players of the 1890s and earned a reputation as a goalscoring winger and he later managed the club during World War I.

=== FA Cup ===
After beating amateur side Casuals 3–0 (twice, after the first match was declared void due to icy pitch) and Burnley 3–1, Stoke drew 2–2 with Sunderland to set up Stoke's first cup replay which they lost 4–0.

== Final league table ==
Pos	Team	Pld	W	D	L	GF	GA	GAv	Pts	Qualification
10	Derby County	26	10	4	12	46	52	0.885	24	
11	Accrington	26	8	4	14	40	78	0.513	20	Re-elected
12	West Bromwich Albion	26	6	6	14	51	58	0.879	18	Reprieved from re-election (Note: West Bromwich Albion were reprieved from re-election due to winning the 1891–92 FA Cup.)
13	Stoke	26	5	4	17	38	61	0.623	14	Re-elected
14	Darwen (R)	26	4	3	19	38	112	0.339	11	Failed re-election and demoted to the Second Division

(R) Relegated

== Results ==
Stoke's score comes first

=== Legend ===
Win	Draw	Loss

=== Football League ===
Match	Date	Opponent	Venue	Result	Attendance	Scorers
1	5 September 1891	Derby County	H	2–1	3,000	Turner (2)
2	12 September 1891	Wolverhampton Wanderers	H	1–3	5,000	Dunn
3	19 September 1891	Burnley	A	1–4	4,000	Evans
4	26 September 1891	Notts County	A	1–1	6,000	Cameron
5	3 October 1891	Darwen	A	3–9	4,500	Cameron, Dunn, Naughton
6	10 October 1891	Burnley	H	3–0	3,500	Cameron (2), Schofield
7	17 October 1891	Derby County	A	3–3	5,000	Naughton, Schofield, Turner
8	24 October 1891	Aston Villa	H	2–3	7,000	Clifford, Schofield
9	7 November 1891	Preston North End	H	0–1	4,500	
10	9 November 1891	Blackburn Rovers	H	0–1	4,000	
11	14 November 1891	Bolton Wanderers	A	1–1	3,500	Ballham
12	21 November 1891	Aston Villa	A	1–2	5,500	Naughton
13	28 November 1891	Sunderland	H	1–3	1,500	Schofield
14	5 December 1891	Darwen	H	5–1	3,000	Schofield (2), Dunn, Turner, Evans
15	12 December 1891	Bolton Wanderers	H	0–1	2,000	
16	19 December 1891	Accrington	H	3–1	3,000	Ballham (2), Schofield
17	25 December 1891	Preston North End	A	2–3	3,000	Evans, Schofield
18	2 January 1892	Wolverhampton Wanderers	A	1–4	1,300	Dunn
19	9 January 1892	Accrington	A	0–3	1,500	
20	6 February 1892	Notts County	H	1–3	4,000	Evans
21	5 March 1892	Everton	A	0–1	7,000	
22	12 March 1892	Everton	H	0–1	2,000	
23	19 March 1892	Blackburn Rovers	A	3–5	2,000	Ballham (2), Turner
24	2 April 1892	Sunderland	A	1–4	3,000	Brodie
25	11 April 1892	West Bromwich Albion	A	2–2	10,000	Evans, Turner
26	23 April 1892	West Bromwich Albion	H	1–0	5,400	Schofield

=== FA Cup ===
Round	Date	Opponent	Venue	Result	Attendance	Scorers
R1	16 January 1892	Casuals	H	3–0	2,000	Dunn (2), Evans
R1	23 January 1892	Casuals	H	3–0	2,000	Schofield, Ballham, Unknown
R2	30 January 1892	Burnley	A	3–1	5,000	Turner, Schofield (2)
R3	13 February 1892	Sunderland	H	2–2	9,000	Turner, Schofield
R3 Replay	20 February 1892	Sunderland	A	0–4	10,000	

== Squad statistics ==
Pos.	Name	League		FA Cup		Total	
Pos.	Name	Apps	Goals	Apps	Goals	Apps	Goals
GK	(England) Ike Brookes	2	0	0	0	2	0
GK	(England) Bill Rowley	24	0	5	0	29	0
FB	(England) George Bateman	5	0	0	0	5	0
FB	(England) Tommy Clare	22	0	5	0	27	0
FB	(England) Jesse Stanley	3	0	0	0	3	0
FB	(England) Alf Underwood	22	0	5	0	27	0
HB	(Scotland) Davy Brodie	24	1	5	0	29	1
HB	(Scotland) Davy Christie	26	0	5	0	31	0
HB	(Scotland) Hughie Clifford	13	1	0	0	13	1
HB	(England) Billy Draycott	1	0	0	0	1	0
HB	(England) Jack Proctor	12	0	3	0	15	0
HB	(England) Bobby Smith	1	0	0	0	1	0
FW	(England) Tommy Arthern	1	0	0	0	1	0
FW	(England) Lewis Ballham	18	5	5	1	23	6
FW	(Scotland) John Cameron	9	4	0	0	9	4
FW	(Scotland) Billy Dunn	23	4	5	2	28	6
FW	(England) Ted Evans	15	5	5	1	20	6
FW	(England) Billy Forrester	1	0	0	0	1	0
FW	(Scotland) Billy Fraser	3	0	0	0	3	0
FW	(Scotland) Willie Naughton	16	3	2	0	18	3
FW	(England) Joe Schofield	16	9	5	4	21	13
FW	(England) John Tunnicliffe	3	0	0	0	3	0
FW	(England) Wilmot Turner	26	6	5	2	31	8
