= Daniel McLaren =

Daniel McLaren may refer to:

- Dan Rice (1823–1900), American entertainer, born Daniel McLaren
- Danny McLaren (1870–?), Scottish footballer
