= George Bateman =

English footballer

Personal information
- Full name: George Henry Bateman
- Date of birth: 1865
- Place of birth: Wolstanton, England
- Date of death: 1953 (aged 87–88)
- Position: Centre-half

Senior career*
Years	Team	Apps	(Gls)
1882–1886	Burslem Port Vale	0	(0)
1886–1887	Stoke	0	(0)
1887–1890	Burslem Port Vale	18	(0)
1890–1892	Stoke	6	(0)
- Northwich Victoria
Total		24+	(0+)
- * Club domestic league appearances and goals

George Henry Bateman (born 1865 – 1953) was an English footballer who played for Burslem Port Vale, Stoke, and Northwich Victoria in the 1880s and 1890s.

== Career ==
Bateman was a key member of Burslem Port Vale, helping men such as Enoch Hood found the club. He was a member of the club's first recorded line-up on 9 December 1882, in a 5–1 defeat at Stoke. He was a member of the sides that lifted the North Staffordshire Charity Challenge Cup in 1883 and Burslem Challenge Cup in 1885 and also shared the former trophy in 1885.

In the summer of 1886 he left for neighbours Stoke, despite having contractual obligations for Vale. A court case went to Burslem County Court in November 1886, but the two clubs agreed that Bateman could play for Stoke until the summer of 1887, at which point he would return to Vale. He was a first-team regular for the Burslem club from 1887 to 1890. In the summer of 1890, he returned to Stoke.

He played once for the "Potters" in the Football Alliance in 1890–91 and featured five times in the Football League in 1891–92. He later played for Northwich Victoria. He had scored five goals in 146 games for the Vale, most of which were friendlies.

== Career statistics ==
Appearances and goals by club, season and competition
Club	Season	League			FA Cup		Total	
Club	Season	Division	Apps	Goals	Apps	Goals	Apps	Goals
Stoke	1886–87	–	–		1	0	1	0
Burslem Port Vale	1887–88	–	0	0	1	0	1	0
Burslem Port Vale	1888–89	The Combination	18	0	0	0	18	0
Burslem Port Vale	1889–90	–	0	0	1	0	1	0
Stoke	1890–91	Football Alliance	1	0	0	0	1	0
Stoke	1891–92	Football League	5	0	0	0	5	0
Career total			24	0	3	0	27	0

== Honours ==
Burslem Port Vale

- North Staffordshire Charity Challenge Cup: 1883, 1885 (shared)
- Burslem Challenge Cup: 1885
