= Hughie Phillips =

Scottish-English footballer

Personal information
- Full name: Hugh Phillips
- Date of birth: 1864
- Place of birth: Lanark, Scotland
- Position: Half-back

Senior career*
Years	Team	Apps	(Gls)
- St Bernard's
1890–1891	Stoke	7	(0)
- * Club domestic league appearances and goals

Hugh Phillips (1864 – unknown) was an English footballer who played in the Football League for Stoke.

== Career ==
Phillips was born in Lanark and played football with St Bernard's before joining Stoke in 1890. He stayed at Stoke for the 1890–91 season where he played seven in matches helping the club to win the Football Alliance title.

== Career statistics ==
Appearances and goals by club, season and competition
Club	Season	League			FA Cup		Total	
Club	Season	Division	Apps	Goals	Apps	Goals	Apps	Goals
Stoke	1890–91	Football Alliance	7	0	0	0	7	0
Career total			7	0	0	0	7	0

== Honours ==
with Stoke

- Football Alliance champions: 1890–91
