= Bobby Smith (footballer, born 1870) =

English footballer

Personal information
- Full name: Robert Smith
- Date of birth: 1870
- Place of birth: Stoke-upon-Trent, England
- Position: Half-back

Senior career*
Years	Team	Apps	(Gls)
- Newcastle Swifts
1891	Stoke	1	(0)
1892	Burslem Port Vale	0	(0)
- * Club domestic league appearances and goals

Robert Smith (born 1870; date of death unknown) was an English footballer who played in the Football League for Stoke.

== Career ==
Smith was born in Stoke-upon-Trent and played for Newcastle Swifts before joining Stoke in 1891. He played one match in the Football League which came in a 3–1 defeat to Wolverhampton Wanderers during the 1891–92 season where he played in place of the injured Davy Brodie. He was released soon after and joined Burslem Port Vale where he failed to make a first-team appearance.

== Career statistics ==
Appearances and goals by club, season and competition
Club	Season	League			FA Cup		Total	
Club	Season	Division	Apps	Goals	Apps	Goals	Apps	Goals
Stoke	1891–92	Football League	1	0	0	0	1	0
Burslem Port Vale	1892–93	Second Division	0	0	0	0	0	0
Career total			1	0	0	0	1	0
