= Hughie Clifford =

Scottish footballer

Hugh Clifford
- Hugh Clifford in Stoke team photo

Personal information
- Full name: Hugh Clifford
- Date of birth: 8 April 1873
- Place of birth: Carfin, Scotland
- Date of death: 3 October 1929 (aged 56)
- Place of death: Lanarkshire, Scotland
- Position: Half-back

Senior career*
Years	Team	Apps	(Gls)
1887	Carfin Shamrock		
1888	Hibernian		
1887	Carfin Shamrock		
1890–1892	Stoke	30	(2)
1892–1893	Celtic	7	(0)
1893	Stoke	1	(0)
1893	Carfin Shamrock		
1894–1895	Motherwell	2	(0)
1895	Manchester City	4	(1)
1896	Carfin Rovers		

International career
1891	Football Alliance XI	1	(0)
- * Club domestic league appearances and goals

Hugh "Hughie" Clifford (8 April 1873 – 1929) was a Scottish footballer, who played for Hibernian, Stoke, Celtic, Motherwell, Liverpool and Manchester City.

== Career ==
Clifford started his career Carfin Shamrock before joining Hibernian in 1887. In 1890 he moved south and joined Football Alliance side Stoke with whom he helped win the title. Midway through the 1891–92 season Clifford returned to Scotland and signed for Celtic in what was an "Illegal" transfer and he was suspended from English football for two years. He signed for Liverpool in May 1892 but never played a game as his transfer was "illegal" as he had already played for Celtic the previous week and the deal fell through. He returned to Stoke in 1893 and played one match in the 1893–94 season. He then went on to play for Motherwell, and spent the 1895–96 season with Manchester City.

== Career statistics ==
Appearances and goals by club, season and competition
Club	Season	League			FA Cup		Glasgow Cup		Total	
Club	Season	Division	Apps	Goals	Apps	Goals	Apps	Goals	Apps	Goals
Hibernian	1888–89	—	—		1	0	—		1	0
Stoke	1890–91	Football Alliance	17	1	3	0	—		20	1
Stoke	1891–92	The Football League	13	1	0	0	—		13	1
Celtic	1891–92	Scottish Football League	1	0	0	0	0	0	1	0
Celtic	1892–93	Scottish Football League	6	0	1	0	2	0	9	0
Stoke	1893–94	First Division	1	0	0	0	—		1	0
Manchester City	1895–96	Second Division	4	1	0	0	—		4	1
Career Total			42	3	5	0	2	0	49	3

== Honours ==
with Stoke

- Football Alliance champions: 1890–91
