= Jack Proctor =

English footballer

Personal information
- Full name: John Proctor
- Date of birth: 1871
- Place of birth: Stoke-upon-Trent, England
- Date of death: 8 November 1893 (aged 22)
- Position: Centre-half

Senior career*
Years	Team	Apps	(Gls)
1890	Dresden United		
1891–1893	Stoke	52	(1)
- * Club domestic league appearances and goals

John Proctor (1871 – 8 November 1893) was an English footballer who played in the Football League for Stoke.

== Career ==
Proctor was born in Stoke-upon-Trent and played for Dresden United before joining Stoke in 1891. He looked to be establishing himself as a potential great full back and played in every match during the 1892–93 season helping Stoke to claim their highest position to that point of 7th. However, after playing 10 matches in the following campaign Proctor fell ill with pneumonia and died at the age of 22. He was a married man, and not long before his death had taken on the tenancy of a pub, the Crown Inn at Fenton.

== Career statistics ==
Appearances and goals by club, season and competition
Club	Season	League			FA Cup		Total	
Club	Season	Division	Apps	Goals	Apps	Goals	Apps	Goals
Stoke	1891–92	The Football League	12	0	3	0	15	0
Stoke	1892–93	First Division	30	1	1	0	31	1
Stoke	1893–94	First Division	10	0	0	0	10	0
Career total			52	1	4	0	56	1
