= Davy Brodie =

Scottish footballer

Personal information
- Full name: David Brodie
- Date of birth: 9 November 1863
- Place of birth: Paisley, Scotland
- Date of death: 1938 (aged 75)
- Position: Half-back

Senior career*
Years	Team	Apps	(Gls)
1887	Paisley		
1888	Abercorn		
1889–1897	Stoke	192	(2)
- * Club domestic league appearances and goals

David Brodie (9 November 1863 – 1938) was a Scottish footballer who played in the Football League for Stoke.

Brodie was one of a generation of Scottish footballers who moved to England to become professional footballers. Brodie was one of many who arrived at Stoke to earn his living in the sport.

== Career ==
Brodie had started out at his local club Paisley before moving to Abercorn. In 1889 he moved south of the border and joined Stoke along with another fellow Scotsman, Davy Christie. The two Davy's became a major part of Stoke's half-back line during the 1890s and helped the club claim the Football Alliance title in 1890–91. Brodie became a regular member of Stoke's early side and spent eight seasons at the Victoria Ground making 213 appearances before leaving in 1897.

== Career statistics ==
Appearances and goals by club, season and competition
Club	Season	League			FA Cup		Test Match		Total	
Club	Season	Division	Apps	Goals	Apps	Goals	Apps	Goals	Apps	Goals
Stoke	1889–90	Football League	11	0	4	0	—		15	0
Stoke	1890–91	Football Alliance	22	0	3	0	—		25	0
Stoke	1891–92	Football League	24	1	5	0	—		29	1
Stoke	1892–93	First Division	30	0	1	1	—		31	1
Stoke	1893–94	First Division	30	1	2	0	—		32	1
Stoke	1894–95	First Division	29	0	2	0	1	0	32	0
Stoke	1895–96	First Division	29	0	2	0	—		31	0
Stoke	1896–97	First Division	17	0	1	0	—		18	0
Career total			192	2	20	1	1	0	213	3

== Honours ==
with Stoke

- Football Alliance champions: 1890–91
