= Billy Dunn (footballer, born 1865) =

Scottish footballer

Personal information
- Full name: William Dunn
- Date of birth: 24 March 1865
- Place of birth: Falkirk, Scotland
- Date of death: 28 July 1921 (aged 56)
- Place of death: Falkirk, Scotland
- Position: Left winger

Senior career*
Years	Team	Apps	(Gls)
1883–1889	East Stirlingshire		
1889–1892	Stoke	60	(18)
1892	Hednesford Town		
1893	Walsall Town Swifts	2	(0)
Total		62	(18)
- * Club domestic league appearances and goals

William Dunn (24 March 1865 – 28 July 1921) was a Scottish footballer who played in the Football League for Stoke and Walsall Town Swifts.

== Football career ==
Dunn started his career with East Stirlingshire and became the clubs all time goalscorer. In an era when many goalscorers were left unrecorded Dunn scored a known 128 goals for East Stirlingshire from his known debut on 13 October 1883 to season 1889–90 in 180 games. During his time at East Stirlingshire he mainly played on the wing but also played in the back and Hhalf-back positions.

In 1889 he moved down to England to play for Stoke along with fellow East Stirlingshire teammate Harry Simpson. In his first season with Stoke, the team suffered a truly terrible campaign and failed to gain re-election to the Football League and so joined the Football Alliance for the 1890–91 season. Stoke found the Alliance much easier as did Dunn who scored eleven goals as the club took the title and with it re-election back into the league. Dunn played most matches during the next season but after injury he was released by the end of the 1892–93 season and joined Hednesford Town before ending his career with Walsall Town Swifts.

== Professional Baseball ==
In 1890 Dunn played professional baseball for Stoke in the National League of Baseball of Great Britain.

== Career statistics ==
Club	Season	League			FA Cup		Total	
Club	Season	Division	Apps	Goals	Apps	Goals	Apps	Goals
Stoke	1889–90	Football League	11	1	4	1	15	2
Stoke	1890–91	Football Alliance	21	11	3	0	24	11
Stoke	1891–92	Football League	23	4	5	2	28	6
Stoke	1892–93	First Division	5	2	0	0	5	2
Stoke	Total		60	18	12	3	72	21
Walsall Town Swifts	1893–94	Second Division	2	0	0	0	2	0
Career Total			62	18	12	3	74	21

== Honours ==
with East Stirlingshire

- Stirlingshire FA Caps: 9
- Stirlingshire Cup Winner: 1885–86, 1886–87, 1887–88, 1888–89
- Stirlingshire Cup Runners up: 1883–84
- Falkirk & District Charity Cup Winners: 1884–85, 1885–86, 1886–87, 1887–88
- Falkirk & District Charity Cup Runners up: 1888–89, 1890–91

with Stoke

- Football Alliance Champions: 1890–91
