= Edward Steele =

Edward Steele may refer to:

- Edward J. Steele (born 1948), Australian molecular immunologist
- Edward Steele (footballer) (1873–?), English footballer
- Edward Strieby Steele, American botanist
- Ed Steele (Edward D. Steele, 1916–1974), American baseball outfielder
- Edward H. Steele, namesake of Steele County, North Dakota
