= Davy Christie =

Scottish footballer

Personal information
- Full name: David Christie
- Date of birth: January 1867
- Place of birth: Forfar, Scotland
- Date of death: 1945 (aged 78)
- Place of death: Stoke-on-Trent
- Position: Half back

Senior career*
Years	Team	Apps	(Gls)
1885–1889	Forfar Athletic		
1889–1894	Stoke	123	(3)
1895	Dresden United		
- * Club domestic league appearances and goals

David Christie (January 1867 – 1945) was a Scottish footballer who played in the Football League for Stoke.

== Career ==
Christie joined Stoke from Scottish side Forfar Athletic in April 1889. He became a very useful addition to a struggling Stoke side and he helped them claim the Football Alliance title in 1890–91. He had a useful skill of maintaining possession of the ball, which was uncommon in Victorian-era football, and as a result, opponents treated him harshly for it. He served with Stoke for six seasons before leaving the Victoria Ground in 1894 after making 136 appearances scoring three goals.

== Career statistics ==
Club	Season	League			FA Cup		Total	
Club	Season	Division	Apps	Goals	Apps	Goals	Apps	Goals
Stoke	1889–90	Football League	14	1	2	0	16	1
Stoke	1890–91	Football Alliance	22	1	3	0	25	1
Stoke	1891–92	Football League	26	0	5	0	31	0
Stoke	1892–93	First Division	27	0	1	0	28	0
Stoke	1893–94	First Division	29	1	2	0	31	1
Stoke	1894–95	First Division	5	0	0	0	5	0
Career Total			123	3	13	0	136	3

== Honours ==
with Stoke

- Football Alliance champions: 1890–91
