= Wilmot Turner =

English footballer

Personal information
- Full name: Wilmot Arthur Turner
- Date of birth: 1865
- Place of birth: Chester, England
- Date of death: 1931 (aged 66)
- Position: Center forward

Senior career*
| Years | Team | Apps | (Gls) |
| 1890–1891 | Chester | | |
| 1890–1892 | Stoke | 51 | (19) |
| 1893–1894 | Ardwick | 1 | (0) |
| Total | | 52 | (19) |
- * Club domestic league appearances and goals

Wilmot Arthur Turner (1865–1931) was an English footballer who played in the Football League for Ardwick and Stoke.

== Football career ==
Turner started his career with his home town club Chester before moving to Football Alliance side Stoke in 1890. He scored eleven goals in the Alliance as Stoke won the title and with it were re-elected back into the Football League. Unfortunately for Turner he was not as prolific in the superior competition, scoring eight goals in two seasons. At the end of the 1892–93 he was allowed to sign for Manchester club Ardwick for whom he played once.

== Professional Baseball ==
In 1890 Turner played professional baseball for Stoke in the National League of Baseball of Great Britain.

== Career statistics ==
Appearances and goals by club, season and competition
| Club | Season | League | | | FA Cup | | Total | |
| Club | Season | Division | Apps | Goals | Apps | Goals | Apps | Goals |
|---|---|---|---|---|---|---|---|---|
| Stoke | 1890–91 | Football Alliance | 20 | 11 | 3 | 1 | 23 | 12 |
| Stoke | 1891–92 | The Football League | 26 | 6 | 5 | 2 | 31 | 8 |
| Stoke | 1892–93 | First Division | 5 | 2 | 0 | 0 | 5 | 2 |
| Stoke | Total | | 51 | 19 | 8 | 3 | 59 | 22 |
| Ardwick | 1892–93 | Second Division | 1 | 0 | 0 | 0 | 1 | 0 |
| Career total | | | 52 | 19 | 8 | 3 | 60 | 22 |

== Honours ==
with Stoke

- Football Alliance champions: 1890–91
