= Huey =

Huey, used as a given name, is a variant of Hughie. It may refer to:

== People ==
- Huey (rapper) (1987–2020), American rapper
- Huey Dunbar, Puerto Rican salsa singer
- Huey Johnson (1933–2020), American environmentalist and politician
- Huey Lewis, rock musician, of the band Huey Lewis & the News
- Huey Long (1893–1935), American politician, governor and U.S. Senator from Louisiana, known as "The Kingfish"
- Huey Long (singer) (1904–2009), American musician
- Huey P. Newton (1942–1989), co-founder of the Black Panther Party
- Huey "Piano" Smith (1934–2023), American R&B pianist
- Hugh Morgan of the Fun Lovin' Criminals, known as Huey
- Iain Hewitson, New Zealand-born chef, nicknamed "Huey"
- Laurence Markham Huey (1892–1963), American zoologist
- Michael Huey (disambiguation), multiple people
- Raymond B. Huey (born 1944), American biologist
- Treat Huey, Filipino tennis player

== Places ==
- Huey, Illinois, a village in the United States
- Huey Creek, a glacial meltwater stream in Antarctica

== Military ==
- Bell UH-1 Iroquois, U.S. Army and U.S. Marine Corps utility helicopter nicknamed the "Huey"
  - Bell Huey family, helicopters related to the UH-1
  - AH-1 Cobra ("Huey Cobra"), attack helicopter derived from the UH-1

== In fiction ==
- Huey, Dewey and Louie, Walt Disney characters
- Baby Huey, cartoon character
- Huey Freeman, the main character in the TV show/comic strip The Boondocks

== Other uses ==
- Huey, a color calibration device from Pantone

== See also ==
- Hughey (disambiguation)
