= Lewis Ballham =

English footballer

Personal information
- Full name: Joseph Lewis Ballham
- Date of birth: c. 1864
- Place of birth: Stoke-upon-Trent, England
- Date of death: 1948 (aged 83–84)
- Place of death: Stoke-on-Trent, England
- Position: Forward

Youth career
- Stoke Locomotive
- Stoke

Senior career*
| Years | Team | Apps | (Gls) |
| 1888–1890 | Burslem Port Vale | 16 | (6) |
| 1890–1892 | Stoke | 38 | (11) |
| Total | | 54 | (17) |
- * Club domestic league appearances and goals

Joseph Lewis Ballham (c.1864 – 1948) was an English footballer. He won the Football Alliance title with Stoke in 1890–91 and also played for Burslem Port Vale. His brother Edgar played a friendly for Port Vale in 1890.

== Career ==
Ballham played for Stoke Locomotive and Stoke, appearing in the FA Cup in 1886–87 and 1887–88, before joining Burslem Port Vale in August 1888. However, he was still under contract to Stoke until the end of September that year. He so had to wait until October to make his debut. The contract issue did not go away. In December 1888, he was forced to pay the club £20 damages and costs at £1 a week by the Stoke County Court. Despite this, and the regular football he enjoyed at Vale, he returned to their rivals in the summer of 1890. He had scored 29 goals in 70 games in all competitions for the Vale. He scored six goals in 20 Football Alliance games in 1890–91, as Stoke won the league title and regained admittance to the Football League. He scored five goals in 18 Football League games in 1891–92 before departing the Victoria Ground.

== Career statistics ==
Appearances and goals by club, season and competition
| Club | Season | League | | | FA Cup | | Total | |
| Club | Season | Division | Apps | Goals | Apps | Goals | Apps | Goals |
|---|---|---|---|---|---|---|---|---|
| Stoke | 1886–87 | – | 0 | 0 | 2 | 0 | 2 | 0 |
| Stoke | 1887–88 | – | 0 | 0 | 4 | 1 | 4 | 1 |
| Burslem Port Vale | 1888–89 | The Combination | 16 | 6 | 0 | 0 | 16 | 6 |
| Burslem Port Vale | 1889–90 | – | 0 | 0 | 0 | 0 | 0 | 0 |
| Stoke | 1890–91 | Football Alliance | 20 | 6 | 3 | 3 | 23 | 9 |
| Stoke | 1891–92 | Football League | 18 | 5 | 5 | 1 | 23 | 6 |
| Career total | | | 54 | 17 | 14 | 5 | 68 | 22 |

== Honours ==
Stoke

- Football Alliance: 1890–91
