= Tommy Clare =

English footballer and manager (1865–1929)

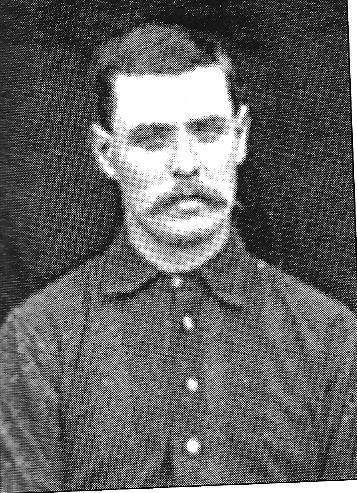
- Clare in his playing days

Personal information
- Full name: Thomas Clare
- Date of birth: 12 March 1865
- Place of birth: Congleton, England
- Date of death: 27 December 1929 (aged 64)
- Place of death: Ladysmith, British Columbia, Canada
- Height: 6 ft 0 in (1.83 m)
- Position: Right back

Youth career
- 1880–1882: Talke Rangers
- 1882–1883: Goldenhill Wanderers

Senior career*
Years	Team	Apps	(Gls)
1883	Burslem Port Vale	0	(0)
1883–1897	Stoke	220	(4)
1897	Burslem Port Vale	21	(0)
1897–1898	Manchester City	1	(0)
1898–1901	Burslem Port Vale	18	(0)
Total		260	(4)

International career
1889–1894	England	4	(0)
1891	Football Alliance XI	1	(0)

Managerial career
- 1905–1906: Burslem Port Vale
- * Club domestic league appearances and goals

Thomas Clare (12 March 1865 – 27 December 1929) was an English international footballer, who played at right-back, and football manager.

He began his playing career with Stoke in July 1884, having moved from Burslem Port Vale. He spent the next 14 years with Stoke, playing 251 games in all competitions, helping them to the Football Alliance title in 1890–91. In 1897, he signed with Manchester City via Port Vale before returning to Vale for three years in 1898, helping them to the Staffordshire Senior Cup on his arrival. He also won four England caps between 1889 and 1894. He was appointed as manager-secretary of Burslem Port Vale in 1905, a position he held for the next six years.

== Early and personal life ==
Thomas Clare was born on 12 March 1865 in Congleton, Cheshire. He was the sixth of eleven children to Thomas Charles and Elizabeth Leigh (née Cottrell); his father was an earthenware manufacturer. He worked as an encaustic tile maker and draughtsman in Wolstanton from at least 1881 to 1891. He married Welsh woman Beatrice Vaughan in 1891, and the couple had one daughter, May Vaughan, in 1893. He was working as a manager for tile spraying machines in 1901. Clare emigrated to Canada shortly before World War I and died in Vancouver in December 1929. The then 51-year-old lied about his age, saying he was 40, to gain entry into the Canadian Expeditionary Force and saw action in the Battle of Passchendaele. He returned home when his true age and his growing medical problems were discovered in November 1917. He later settled in the United States, working as a salesman in Seattle, and died of a myocarditis in Ladysmith, British Columbia, Canada on 27 December 1929.

== Club career ==
Clare played his early football with Talke Rangers, Goldenhill Wanderers and Burslem Port Vale before becoming Stoke's first professional player in 1883.

He was captain of the Stoke side that were founder members of the English Football League in 1888. He made his league debut on 8 September 1888, at full-back for Stoke in a 2–0 defeat by West Bromwich Albion at the Victoria Ground, Stoke. He played 21 of Stoke's 22 Football League matches and was part of a defence line that achieved three clean sheets whilst restricting the opposition to a single goal on four occasions.

Stoke finished at the bottom of the table in both 1888–89 and 1889–90 and in 1890 dropped down to the Football Alliance. Clare was absolved of any blame, though, and referee Tom Bryan stated that "the backs and the goalkeeper are superior to any three men playing with one club". The following season, Stoke were champions of the Football Alliance and returned to the Football League, with Clare an ever-present. They then once again struggled, finishing second last in 1891–92, before finishing in mid-table in 1892–93. He claimed his first Football League goal on the opening day of the 1893–94 season, netting from a goalmouth scramble in a 4–1 defeat at Bolton Wanderers. From Christmas 1894 up until his departure in 1897 he played 82 consecutive league games. His final season with the club came in 1896–97. During his 12 seasons with Stoke, Clare made over 250 appearances and forged a decent defensive partnership with fellow full-back Alf Underwood.

Clare signed for Port Vale as a player-coach in 1897, before moving on to Manchester City later in the year. However, in 1898 he re-signed for Vale a second time. He helped the side lift the Staffordshire Senior Cup later in the year as he "inspired a confidence never before approached" in his teammates in the win over West Bromwich Albion. However, he broke his leg in October 1898, an injury which effectively ended his career. He retired in 1901.

== International career ==
Clare earned his first England cap for the match against Ireland on 2 March 1889. The match was played at Anfield, then the home of Everton, and the selectors made eleven changes to the side that had beaten Wales a week before with nine new caps, including Clare's Stoke teammate, Bill Rowley in goal. England won the match "quite comfortably" 6–1, with John Yates scoring a hat-trick in his only international appearance.

Clare's next England appearance came three years later, also against Ireland, at the Solitude Ground, Belfast, when he was joined by his Stoke teammates, goalkeeper Bill Rowley and left-back Alf Underwood. Harry Daft of Notts County was awarded the captaincy for the last of his five England appearances and marked the occasion by scoring twice, either side of half-time, in an "unconvincing victory".

Clare played twice more for England, against Wales on 13 March 1893 (won 6–0, with Fred Spiksley scoring twice on his debut) and Scotland on 7 April 1894 (2–2 draw).

== Style of play ==
Clare stood at 6 ft 0 in (1.83 m) tall and weighed 12 stone 10 pounds (81 kg), giving him a physical edge over opposition forwards. He was good in the air and was described as "quick and resolute" with "capital style". He was known to endanger opposition players with his harsh and sometimes wild tackling, and helped to give Stoke a reputation as an overly physical side. Another source described Tommy Clare as an inspirational player; he was a splendid header of the ball, was quick off the mark, strong and purposeful in the tackle and ever-reliable, always working for his team.

== Management career ==
Clare was appointed Port Vale's manager-secretary in July 1905 and stepped down the following year after the club could no longer afford his wages.

== Career statistics ==
=== Playing statistics ===
Appearances and goals by club, season and competition
Club	Season	League			FA Cup		Test Match		Total	
Club	Season	Division	Apps	Goals	Apps	Goals	Apps	Goals	Apps	Goals
Stoke	1885–86	—	—		2	0	—		2	0
Stoke	1886–87	—	—		2	2	—		2	2
Stoke	1887–88	—	—		4	0	—		4	0
Stoke	1888–89	Football League	21	0	0	0	—		21	0
Stoke	1889–90	Football League	14	0	4	0	—		18	0
Stoke	1890–91	Football Alliance	22	0	3	0	—		25	0
Stoke	1891–92	Football League	22	0	5	0	—		27	0
Stoke	1892–93	First Division	30	0	1	0	—		31	0
Stoke	1893–94	First Division	27	3	2	0	—		29	3
Stoke	1894–95	First Division	24	0	2	0	1	0	27	0
Stoke	1895–96	First Division	30	1	4	0	—		34	1
Stoke	1896–97	First Division	30	0	2	0	—		32	0
Stoke	Total		220	4	31	2	1	0	252	6
Burslem Port Vale	1897–98	Midland League	21	0	5	0	—		26	0
Manchester City	1897–98	First Division	1	0	0	0	—		1	0
Burslem Port Vale	1898–99	Second Division	13	0	0	0	—		13	0
Burslem Port Vale	1899–1900	Second Division	0	0	0	0	—		0	0
Burslem Port Vale	1900–01	Second Division	5	0	0	0	—		5	0
Burslem Port Vale	Total		18	0	0	0	—		18	0
Career total			260	4	36	2	1	0	297	6

=== International statistics ===
England national team
Year	Apps	Goals
1889	1	0
1892	1	0
1893	1	0
1894	1	0
Total	4	0

=== Managerial statistics ===
Managerial record by team and tenure
Team	From	To	Record				
Team	From	To	P	W	D	L	Win %
Burslem Port Vale	1 August 1905	1 July 1906	40	13	4	23	32.5
Total			40	13	4	23	32.5

== Honours ==
Port Vale

- Staffordshire Senior Cup: 1898

Stoke

- Football Alliance: 1890–91
