= Jimmy Dale =

Jimmy Dale may refer to:

- Jimmy Dale (footballer) (1870–1948), Scottish footballer
- Jimmy Dale (musician) (1935–2017), Canadian musician

== See also ==
- Jimmie Dale - a literary character created by Frank L. Packard
