= Jimmy Mellor =

English footballer (1870–~1895)

Personal information
- Full name: James Mellor
- Date of birth: 1870
- Place of birth: Stoke-upon-Trent, England
- Position: Outside left

Senior career*
Years	Team	Apps	(Gls)
1894	Dresden United		
1894–1895	Stoke	1	(0)
1895	Stone BL		
- * Club domestic league appearances and goals

James Mellor (1870 – after 1895) was an English footballer who played in the Football League for Stoke.

== Career ==
Mellor was born in Stoke-upon-Trent and played for Dresden United before joining Stoke where he made one appearance which came in a 3–1 defeat to Nottingham Forest in February 1895 due to an injury to Joe Schofield. He re-entered amateur football with Stone BL.

== Career statistics ==
Appearances and goals by club, season and competition
Club	Season	League			FA Cup		Total	
Club	Season	Division	Apps	Goals	Apps	Goals	Apps	Goals
Stoke	1894–95	First Division	1	0	0	0	1	0
Career total			1	0	0	0	1	0
