= William Forrester =

William Forrester may refer to:

- William Forrester (racecourse owner) (1842–1901), Australian racehorse and racecourse owner
- William Forrester (politician) (1855–1926), member of the House of Commons of Canada
- William Forrester (footballer, born 1869) (1869–?), English footballer
- Will Forrester (born 2001), English footballer
- William Ray Forrester (1911–2001), law school dean
- Bill Forrester (born 1957), American swimmer
- William Forrester, the character played by Sean Connery in the film Finding Forrester
