= Hughey =

Hughey may refer to:

== People ==
- John Hughey, American musician
- Jim Hughey, a pitcher for the Milwaukee Brewers
- Matthew Hughey, associate professor of sociology at the University of Connecticut

== Places ==
- Hughey, Wisconsin, United States

== See also ==
- Huey (disambiguation)
- Hugh (disambiguation)
- Hughes (disambiguation)
