= Edward Steele (footballer) =

English footballer

Personal information
- Full name: Edward Steele
- Date of birth: 1873
- Place of birth: Longton, Staffordshire, England
- Date of death: Unknown
- Position: Full back

Senior career*
| Years | Team | Apps | (Gls) |
| 1890 | Longton Town | | |
| 1891 | Edensor Free Wanderers | | |
| 1892 | Longton Zion | | |
| 1893 | Longton Atlas | | |
| 1894–1895 | Stoke | 0 | (0) |
| 1895 | Dresden United | | |
| 1896 | Wellingborough | | |
| 1897–1899 | Crewe Alexandra | | |
| 1899 | Dresden Victoria | | |
| 1900 | Dresden Queen's Park | | |
- * Club domestic league appearances and goals

Edward Steele (1873–unknown) was an English footballer who played for Stoke.

== Career ==
Steele was born in Longton, Staffordshire and played amateur football with Longton Town, Edensor Free Wanderers, Longton Zion and Longton Atlas before joining Stoke in 1894–95 and played mainly for the reserve side in The Combination. Steele played in a league match for Stoke against Sheffield Wednesday on 6 April 1895 but the match was abandoned after 75 minutes at 0–0 after the referee left the field after being verbally abused by some spectators. The match was consequently replayed and Steele did not keep his place in the side. His only appearance for Stoke came in the end of season Test Match against Newton Heath, taking the place of the sick Jack Eccles, Stoke went on to win 3–0. Steele left the club at the end of season and he went on to play for Dresden United, Wellingborough, Crewe Alexandra, Dresden Victoria and Dresden Queen's Park.

== Career statistics ==
| Club | Season | League | | | FA Cup | | Test Match | | Total | |
| Club | Season | Division | Apps | Goals | Apps | Goals | Apps | Goals | Apps | Goals |
|---|---|---|---|---|---|---|---|---|---|---|
| Stoke | 1894–95 | First Division | 0 | 0 | 0 | 0 | 1 | 0 | 1 | 0 |
| Career Total | | | 0 | 0 | 0 | 0 | 1 | 0 | 1 | 0 |
