= Len Mudie =

Scottish footballer

Personal information
- Full name: Leonard Mudie
- Date of birth: 1872
- Place of birth: Forfar, Scotland
- Position: Inside forward

Senior career*
| Years | Team | Apps | (Gls) |
| 1888–1889 | Burnley | 1 | (0) |
| 1889–1890 | Stoke | 3 | (1) |
| 1890 | Dundee Wanderers | | |
- * Club domestic league appearances and goals

Leonard Mudie was a Scottish footballer who played in the Football League for Burnley and Stoke.

== Playing career ==
Mudie came down from Scotland as part of three new signings to strengthen a Burnley team that had struggled in the first half of the inaugural Football League season. Mudie made his debut on 8 December 1888 at Turf Moor, home of Burnley to play the visitors Stoke. Mudie replaced Ross McMahon at centre-forward as the latter had been injured in the previous match. Both teams were at the "wrong end" of the League and the game was described as "fought hard and passionate". Burnley had the better of the first half and went in 1–0 in the lead. The second half was more closely contested with Burnley gaining a 2–0 advantage and Stoke guaranteeing an exciting finish by making it 2–1. Burnley hung on to win. Mudie' performance was described as "unimpressive" and he did not play for Burnley again. Burnley finished ninth in the League and scored 42 goals in 22 games.

Mudie was playing for Burnley when in September 1889 he moved to play for Stoke. Mudie played three matches for Stoke scoring once against Notts County. He left for Dundee Wanderers soon after however following a disagreement with the directors.

== Career statistics ==
Appearances and goals by club, season and competition
| Club | Season | League | | | FA Cup | | Total | |
| Club | Season | Division | Apps | Goals | Apps | Goals | Apps | Goals |
|---|---|---|---|---|---|---|---|---|
| Burnley | 1888–89 | The Football League | 1 | 0 | 0 | 0 | 1 | 0 |
| Stoke | 1889–90 | The Football League | 3 | 1 | 0 | 0 | 3 | 1 |
| Career Total | | | 4 | 1 | 0 | 0 | 4 | 1 |
