= Bob McCormick (Scottish footballer) =

Scottish footballer

Personal information
- Full name: Robert McCormick
- Date of birth: 1864
- Place of birth: Paisley, Scotland
- Position: Right winger

Senior career*
Years	Team	Apps	(Gls)
1886–1889	Abercorn		
1889–1890	Stoke	12	(2)
1890–1892	Abercorn		

International career
1886	Scotland	1	(1)
- * Club domestic league appearances and goals

Robert McCormick (1864–unknown) was a Scottish footballer, who played for Stoke in the Football League.

== Career ==
McCormick started playing for Scottish club Abercorn and he helped them win the 1886 Scottish Cup. In 1889 he moved down to England to play for Stoke. McCormick played in 12 league matches and scored twice during the 1889–90 season before returning to Abercorn.

McCormick played for Scotland once, scoring in a 4–1 win against Wales in April 1886.

== Career statistics ==
=== Club ===
Club	Season	League			FA Cup		Total	
Club	Season	Division	Apps	Goals	Apps	Goals	Apps	Goals
Stoke	1889–90	The Football League	12	2	0	0	12	2
Career Total			12	2	0	0	12	2

=== International ===
National team	Year	Apps	Goals
Scotland	1886	1	1
Total		1	1
