= Jock Simpson =

Footballer (1886–1959)

Personal information
- Full name: John Robert Simpson
- Date of birth: 25 December 1885
- Place of birth: Pendleton, England
- Date of death: 4 January 1959 (aged 73)
- Place of death: Falkirk, Scotland
- Position: Outside right

Senior career*
Years	Team	Apps	(Gls)
–	Grange Rovers		
–	Laurieston Villa		
1905–1911	Falkirk	176	(100)
1911–1919	Blackburn Rovers	151	(16)
1916–1919	→ Falkirk (loan)	91	(15)
–	Falkirk Amateurs		
–	Falkirk Orient		
Total		418	(131)

International career
1910	Scottish League XI	1	(0)
1911–1914	Football League XI		
1911–1914	England	8	(1)
1916–1917	Scottish League (wartime)	3	(1)
1918	England (wartime)	1	(0)
- * Club domestic league appearances and goals

John Robert Simpson (25 December 1885 – 4 January 1959) was a footballer who played as an outside right in the 1900s and 1910s.

== Club career ==
Simpson's footballing career began with Laurieston Villa, and after a trial with Rangers, he signed for Falkirk in 1905. The club finished runners-up in the Scottish Football League twice during his six-year spell (1907–08 and 1909–10), and he scored over 100 league goals, sometimes playing at centre forward, including 32 from 33 appearances in 1907–08, the highest total in the country.

In January 1911, Simpson moved to Blackburn Rovers for a fee of £1800, a record fee received by a Scottish club. Whilst he was at Ewood Park, they won the Football League First Division title in 1911–12 and 1913–14. He made a total of 151 Football League appearances for Blackburn, scoring 16 goals.

After a comeback to senior football with Falkirk during World War I (when all official English football was suspended but the Scottish League continued), this being fairly unsuccessful due to the enduring effects of kicks from opponents during his peak years, he finally saw out his final playing years with Falkirk Amateurs, then Falkirk Orient in the Falkirk Wednesday Shopkeepers League. At Falkirk he played a total of 269 Scottish League matches, including the wartime as a 'guest player', scoring 116 goals.

== International career ==
Simpson represented the Scottish League in 1910 while he was a Falkirk player.

He made his full international debut for England on 11 February 1911 against Ireland, weeks after joining Blackburn (the Football Association had been aware of him at Falkirk but did not want to select a player based in Scotland, and only his birthplace came into consideration at that time, so he was ineligible for Scotland despite his upbringing and parentage). Simpson made a total of eight appearances for England, participating in victorious British Home Championship tournaments of 1910–11 and 1912–13, with his last cap coming on 16 March 1914 against Wales.

He also appeared for the Football League XI, played for the 'Anglo-Scots' in a wartime fundraising match in 1917, and featured for England against Scotland in a 1918 charity match.

== Personal life ==
Simpson was born in Pendleton, Lancashire, to Scottish parents who returned to work in their home town of Falkirk within months of his birth. Several family members (including Harry Simpson) were also footballers at local teams, and he was related to the Australian international cricketer Bob Simpson.

After his football career, he settled in Falkirk, running a public house in the town; he died in 1959 and is interred in Falkirk Cemetery.
