= Jimmy Sayer =

English footballer

Personal information
- Full name: James Sayer
- Date of birth: July or September 1862
- Place of birth: Mexborough, England
- Date of death: 1 February 1922 (aged 59)
- Place of death: Stoke on Trent, England
- Position: Outside right

Senior career*
Years	Team	Apps	(Gls)
1880	Mexborough		
1881–1884	Heeley		
1884–1885	The Wednesday		
1885–1890	Stoke	14	(1)
1890	Mexborough		

International career
1887	England	1	(0)
- * Club domestic league appearances and goals

James Sayer (July or September 1862 – 1 February 1922) was an English footballer who played 24 times for Stoke and gained one cap with the England national team.

== Career ==
Sayer played for Yorkshire clubs Mexborough, Heeley, The Wednesday and Sheffield before joining Stoke in 1885. He made his League debut on 8 September 1888, as a forward for Stoke in a 2–0 defeat by West Bromwich Albion at the Victoria Ground. and went on to play seven league matches in the 1888–89 scoring one goal in a 1–1 draw against Derby County on 6 April 1889. Sayer also played seven League games in the 1889–90 campaigns before leaving to return to his home town Mexborough.

== Style of play ==
He was dubbed 'Greyhound' by Stoke fans due to his pace.

== International career ==
Sayer made one international appearance for England in a 7–0 win over Ireland in 1887.

== Personal life ==
Sayer was secretary of a Stoke pottery company and he later became the director of Fielding Ltd, a manufacturer of Devon ceramics.

== Career statistics ==
=== Club ===
Appearances and goals by club, season and competition
Club	Season	League			FA Cup		Total	
Club	Season	Division	Apps	Goals	Apps	Goals	Apps	Goals
Stoke	1885–86	—	—		2	1	2	1
Stoke	1886–87	—	—		2	0	2	0
Stoke	1887–88	—	—		3	0	3	0
Stoke	1888–89	The Football League	7	1	1	0	8	1
Stoke	1889–90	The Football League	7	0	2	1	9	1
Career total			14	1	10	2	24	3

=== International ===
National team	Year	Apps	Goals
England	1887	1	0
Total		1	0
