= Hanley Town F.C. (1882) =

Football club in Hanley, England

- Full name: Hanley Town Football Club
- Nicknames: Town, the Townies
- Founded: 1882
- Dissolved: 1895
- Ground: Etruria
Home colours

Hanley Town F.C. was an association football club from Hanley, Staffordshire, active in the late 19th and early 20th century.

== History ==
The club's first recorded game was in 1882, although the club claimed a foundation date of 1876. Its first success of note was winning the Staffordshire Junior Cup in 1888–89, beating Smallthorne Swifts 4–3 at Stoke in a second replay. The club suffered a setback in 1892, when its honorary secretary, Harvey Jones, who had been involved since the club's foundation, died suddenly, one day after announcing the fixture list for 1892–93 at a club meeting.

The club reached the final of the Staffordshire Junior Charity Cup in 1893–94, losing to Port Vale Rovers (the Valiants' reserve side), with a protest against the late arrival of the Vale XI being rejected.

Staunchly remaining amateur, Town joined the Combination in 1894, having also been accepted as a member of the North Staffordshire & District League; an attempt to change the latter entry to a reserve side was rejected, forcing Town in theory to play its first XI, but, given that the club used 60 players over the season, that was a demand more honoured in the breach than the observance.

Town left the Combination after a single season, owing to the difficulties in securing a suitable ground. The club had finished 8th out of 10 (despite having had 2 points deducted for fielding ineligible players).

After an application to re-join the North Staffordshire & District League for the 1895–96 season was rejected, the club could not find a new berth; a late application to enter the Staffordshire Senior Cup in October 1895 was rejected and no more is heard of the club, many of the players joining Sneyd Green in the Staffordshire Junior League. The name has been used by other clubs, including clubs founded in 1896 and 1904, and the current club.

== Colours ==
The club wore red and white striped shirts, but unusually with red knickers.

== Ground ==
The club originally played at Athletic Ground in Cobridge. By 1888 it was playing at Finney Gardens in Deepdale, and in 1894 it moved to a bigger space in Etruria Vale in time for the Combination season, requiring the club to purchase goal-nets for the first time. A ground used by a later Hanley Town, which may have been the same ground, was next to Anderton Wharf, and the players used the Bird in Hand pub for facilities.

== Notable players ==
- William Forrester, who joined Stoke F.C. in 1891.
