= William Forrester (footballer, born 1869) =

English footballer

Billy Forrester
Personal information
- Full name: William Forrester
- Date of birth: 1869
- Place of birth: Stoke-upon-Trent, England
- Position: Outside left

Senior career*
Years	Team	Apps	(Gls)
1890	Hanley Town		
1891	Stoke	1	(0)
1892	Hanley Town		
- * Club domestic league appearances and goals

William Forrester (1869 – after 1892) was an English footballer who played in the Football League for Stoke.

== Career ==
Forrester was born in Stoke-upon-Trent and played for Hanley Town before joining Stoke in 1891. He played one match in the Football League which came in a 3–0 defeat to Accrington during the 1891–92 season where he played in place of the injured Billy Dunn. He was released soon after and re-joined Hanley Town.

== Career statistics ==
Appearances and goals by club, season and competition
Club	Season	League			FA Cup		Total	
Club	Season	Division	Apps	Goals	Apps	Goals	Apps	Goals
Stoke	1891–92	The Football League	1	0	0	0	1	0
Career total			1	0	0	0	1	0
