= Jimmie Robertson =

Scottish footballer

Personal information
- Full name: Jimmie Robertson
- Date of birth: July 1868
- Place of birth: Dundee, Scotland
- Date of death: 1950 (aged 82)
- Place of death: Scotland
- Position: Centre forward

Senior career*
Years	Team	Apps	(Gls)
1891	Dundee		
1892–1895	Stoke	60	(19)
1895	Ashton North End		
1895	Manchester City	3	(2)
- * Club domestic league appearances and goals

Jimmie Robertson (July 1868 – 1950) was a Scottish footballer who played in the Football League for Manchester City and Stoke.

== Career ==
Robertson began playing football for his local club Dundee before moving to English side Stoke in 1892. He had a fine debut season scoring eleven goals in 1892–93 helping Stoke to their highest league position to that point of 7th. He scored eight goals in 1893–94 but failed to add to his tally the following season and left for Manchester City where he scored twice in three matches.

== Career statistics ==
Appearances and goals by club, season and competition
Club	Season	League			FA Cup		Total	
Club	Season	Division	Apps	Goals	Apps	Goals	Apps	Goals
Stoke	1892–93	First Division	26	11	1	0	27	11
Stoke	1893–94	First Division	26	8	2	0	28	8
Stoke	1894–95	First Division	8	0	2	1	10	1
Stoke	Total		60	19	5	1	65	20
Manchester City	1895–96	Second Division	3	2	0	0	3	2
Career total			63	21	5	1	68	22
