= Joseph Bradshaw (football manager) =

English football manager (1860–1933)

Personal information
- Date of birth: 1860
- Place of birth: Stoke-upon-Trent, England
- Date of death: 1933 (aged 72–73)
- Place of death: Stoke-on-Trent, England

Managerial career
- Years: Team
- 1890–1892: Stoke

Joseph A. Bradshaw (1860–1933) was an English football manager who managed Stoke.

== Career ==
Bradshaw was born in Stoke-upon-Trent and took over from Harry Lockett as Stoke manager in June 1890. Stoke had just finished bottom of the Football League for the second time and failed to be re-elected, instead joining the Football Alliance. Whilst Stoke had struggled to compete in the League they found the Alliance easy ending the 1890–91 season as champions with just two defeats and re-claimed their place in the Football League. But halfway through the 1891–92 campaign with the team struggling, he left his position to be replaced by Arthur Reeves.

== Managerial statistics ==
Managerial record by team and tenure
Team	From	To	Record				
Team	From	To	P	W	D	L	Win %
Stoke	August 1890	January 1892	33	9	5	19	27.3
Total			33	9	5	19	27.3

== Honours ==
- Football Alliance champions: 1890–91
