= Hanley Town F.C. =

English football club

Coordinates: 53°01′42.44″N 2°08′54.86″W

Hanley Town
- Full name: Hanley Town Football Club
- Founded: 1966
- Ground: Potteries Park, Stoke-on-Trent
- Chairman: Tom McGrew
- Manager: Scott Dundas
- League: Northern Premier League Division One West
- 2025–26: Midland League Premier Division, 1st of 18 (promoted)
- Website: hanleytown.co.uk
| Home colours | Away colours |

Hanley Town Football Club is a football club based in Hanley, Stoke-on-Trent, England. They are currently members of the Northern Premier League Division One West and play at Potteries Park.

== History ==
The original Hanley Town was established in the 19th century, with their first recorded game being in 1882. They joined the Combination in 1894, but left the league after a single season and subsequently folded; other clubs of the same name followed, the last folding in 1912.

The modern club was established in 1966, based on an existing Sunday league pub team named the Trumpet. The new club joined the Longton League for the 1966–67 season, winning it at the first attempt. They then moved up to the Staffordshire County League, winning Division Two in 1967–68 and then Division One the following season, earning promotion to the Premier Division.

Hanley were Premier Division runners-up in their first three seasons in the division, also winning the Premier Cup in 1969–70. They won the league title in 1972–73 and again in 1975–76, after which they joined Division Two of the Mid-Cheshire League. They won the Division Two Cup in 1976–77 with a 1–0 win over Knutsford in the final, and a third-place finish the following season saw them promoted to Division One. They were Division One champions in 1982–83, but after several seasons of mid-table finishes and being refused entry to the North West Counties League in 1988 due to failure to meet the ground grading requirements, they finished bottom of Division One in 1993–94 and dropped into junior football.

In 1996 Hanley returned to the Mid-Cheshire League, joining Division Two. However, after two seasons they switched to the Midland League and in 2004–05 they were Midland League champions. At the end of the season the league merged with the Staffordshire County League to form the Staffordshire County Senior League. Hanley were placed in the Premier Division and were the league's inaugural champions in 2005–06 before finishing as runners-up the following season.

Hanley were Premier Division runners-up again in 2010–11, before winning back-to-back titles in 2011–12 and 2012–13, after which they were promoted to Division One of the North West Counties League; the 2012–13 season also saw them win the League Cup, the Staffordshire FA Vase and the Leek Cup. In 2014–15 the club finished fourth and qualified for the promotion play-offs; after a 3–1 win over Holker Old Boys in the semi-finals, they lost 5–3 to AFC Darwen in the final. However, the club were Division One champions the following season, earning promotion to the Premier Division.

At the end of the 2020–21 season Hanley were transferred to the Premier Division of the Midland League. They went on to win the Premier Division title in 2021–22, earning promotion to Division One West of the Northern Premier League. However, after finishing second-from-bottom of Division One West in 2024–25, the club were relegated back to the Premier Division of the Midland League. They were Premier Division champions the following season, securing an immediate promotion back to Division One West.

== Ground ==
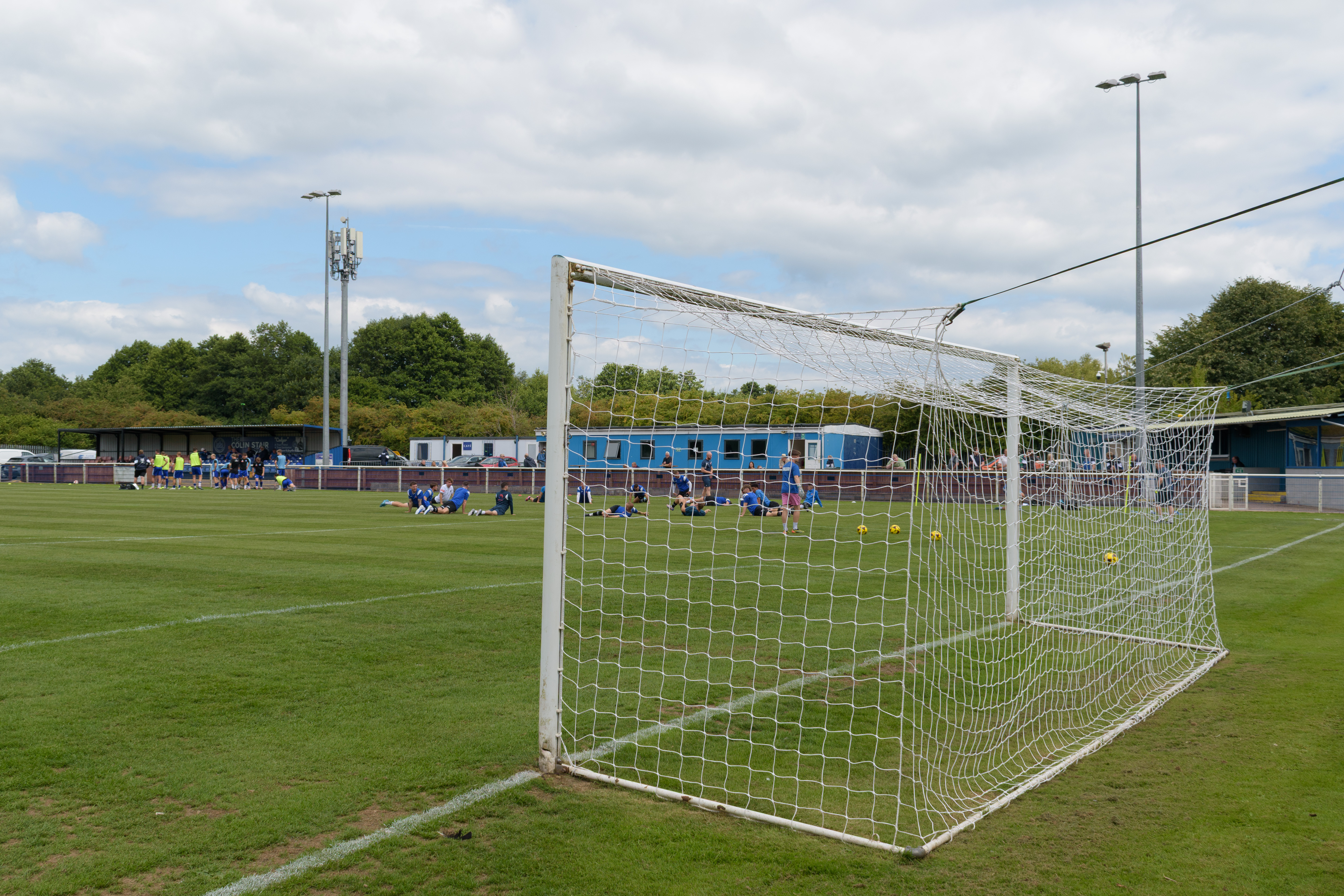
Potteries Park, home ground of Hanley Town

The modern Hanley Town initially played on a pitch on Victoria Road which was leased from the Copestick & Farrell engineering company. Changing rooms were built at the site once the club joined the Staffordshire County League. However, the club was forced to leave the Victoria Road ground in 1971 when developers took over the site and moved to Eastwood Hanley's Trentmill Road ground. However, when Eastwood Hanley attempted to increase the rent in 1974, the club relocated to Leek Town's Harrison Park. They played there until 1976 when the club moved to its current Potteries Park ground.

== Honours ==
- Midland Football League
  - Premier Division champions 2021–22, 2025–26
- North West Counties League
  - Division One champions 2015–16
- Staffordshire County Senior League
  - Premier Division champions 2005–06, 2011–12, 2012–13
  - League Cup winners 2012–13
- Midland League
  - Champions 2004–05
- Mid-Cheshire League
  - Division One champions 1981–82
  - League Cup winners 1979–80, 1980–81, 1986–87
  - Division Two Cup winners 1976–77
- Staffordshire County League
  - Premier Division champions 1972–73, 1975–76
  - Division One champions 1968–69
  - Division Two champions 1967–68
  - Premier Cup winners 1969–70
- Longton League
  - Champions 1966–67

== Records ==
- Best FA Cup performance: Third qualifying round, 2021–22, 2022–23
- Best FA Vase performance: Third round, 2020–21, 2025–26
- Record attendance: 1,750 vs Wrexham, friendly match, 13 July 2024

== See also ==
- Hanley Town F.C. players
- Hanley Town F.C. managers
