= Tommy Arthern =

English footballer

Personal information
- Full name: Thomas James Arthern
- Date of birth: 24 September 1868
- Place of birth: Stockport, England
- Date of death: 1947 (aged 78–79)
- Position: Forward

Senior career*
Years	Team	Apps	(Gls)
1890	Hanley Town		
1891–1892	Stoke	1	(0)
1892	Congleton Hornets		
- * Club domestic league appearances and goals

Thomas James Arthern (24 September 1868 – 1947) was an English footballer who played in the Football League for Stoke.

== Career ==
Arthern was born in Stoke-upon-Trent and started his career with Hanley Town before joining Stoke in September 1891. He played in one match for Stoke during the 1891–92 season which came in a 3–1 defeat at home to Wolverhampton Wanderers. He re-entered local football with Congleton.

== Career statistics ==
Appearances and goals by club, season and competition
Club	Season	League			FA Cup		Total	
Club	Season	Division	Apps	Goals	Apps	Goals	Apps	Goals
Stoke	1891–92	The Football League	1	0	0	0	1	0
Career total			1	0	0	0	1	0
