= 1894–95 Stoke F.C. season =

Stoke
1894–95 season
- Chairman: Mr S. Barker
- Manager: Arthur Reeves
- Stadium: Victoria Ground
- Football League First Division: 14th (24 Points)
- FA Cup: Second Round
- Test Match: Winner
- Top goalscorer: League: Joe Schofield & Billy Dickson (13); All: Joe Schofield & Billy Dickson (13)
- Highest home attendance: 7,000 vs Sunderland (26 January 1895)
- Lowest home attendance: 1,000 vs Small Heath (27 October 1894)
- Average home league attendance: 3,875
Home colours

The 1894–95 season was Stoke's sixth season in the Football League.

Stoke's league struggles continued in the 1894–95 season as they were almost relegated but survived after winning five out the final six matches. This meant that Stoke played a test match against Second Division side Newton Heath which the "Potters" won 3–0 to preserve their First Division status.

== Season Review ==
=== League ===
Stoke had a poor 1894–95 season and by the end of February 1895 they looked destined for relegation. However Stoke made it in to the end of season test match with a remarkable run of five victories and a draw in their final six fixtures. Goal average just favoured West Bromwich at the foot of the table who finished a position higher. In the test match Stoke were paired with Newton Heath the venue being nearby Burslem, Stoke, backed by over 3,000 fans won 3–0, two goals coming from Joe Schofield, who was for the fourth season running was leading goalscorer, on this occasion jointly with Billy Dickson.

That late recovery was largely fuelled by the signing of Sunderland's Scottish forward, Tommy Hyslop who scored seven goals in seven games including a hat-trick on his debut against Derby County. Hyslop went on to be capped for Scotland whilst at Stoke becoming the clubs's first Scottish international.

=== FA Cup ===
Stoke exited the FA Cup at the Second Round again this time losing 2–0 away at Staffordshire rivals Wolverhampton Wanderers.

== Final league table ==
Pos	Team	Pld	W	D	L	GF	GA	GAv	Pts	Relegation
12	Small Heath	30	9	7	14	50	74	0.676	25	
13	West Bromwich Albion	30	10	4	16	51	66	0.773	24	
14	Stoke (O)	30	9	6	15	50	67	0.746	24	Qualification for test matches
15	Derby County (O)	30	7	9	14	45	68	0.662	23	Qualification for test matches
16	Liverpool (R)	30	7	8	15	51	70	0.729	22	Qualification for test matches

Source: World Football
Rules for classification: 1) Points; 2) Goal average; 3) Goals scored
(O) Play-off winners; (R) Relegated

== Results ==
Stoke's score comes first

=== Legend ===
Win	Draw	Loss

=== Football League First Division ===
Match	Date	Opponent	Venue	Result	Attendance	Scorers
1	1 September 1894	Bolton Wanderers	A	2–2	6,000	Dickson (2)
2	8 September 1894	Everton	H	1–3	5,000	T. Robertson
3	15 September 1894	Blackburn Rovers	A	0–6	7,000	
4	22 September 1894	Sheffield United	H	1–3	3,000	Schofield
5	29 September 1894	Aston Villa	H	4–1	5,000	Schofield (2), Dickson (2)
6	6 October 1894	Sunderland	A	1–3	5,000	Dickson
7	13 October 1894	Nottingham Forest	H	0–3	3,000	
8	20 October 1894	Liverpool	A	0–2	8,000	
9	27 October 1894	Small Heath	H	2–2	1,000	Naughton, Farrell
10	10 November 1894	Liverpool	H	3–1	3,000	Schofield, Sandland (2)
11	12 November 1894	Preston North End	H	2–1	4,000	Schofield, Farrell
12	17 November 1894	Small Heath	A	2–4	4,000	Heames, Farrell
13	24 November 1894	Wolverhampton Wanderers	A	0–0	6,000	
14	8 December 1894	The Wednesday	H	0–2	3,000	
15	15 December 1894	West Bromwich Albion	A	2–3	4,400	Dickson, Schofield
16	25 December 1894	Preston North End	A	0–3	5,000	
17	26 December 1894	Aston Villa	A	0–6	12,000	
18	7 January 1895	Everton	A	0–3	6,000	
19	12 January 1895	Bolton Wanderers	H	5–0	2,500	Brookfield (2), Schofield (2), Dickson
20	19 January 1895	Derby County	A	1–1	2,500	Farrell
21	26 January 1895	Sunderland	H	2–5	7,000	Meston (2)
22	4 February 1895	Wolverhampton Wanderers	H	0–0	3,000	
23	9 February 1895	Sheffield United	A	0–3	3,500	
24	23 February 1895	Nottingham Forest	A	1–3	5,500	Naughton
25	23 March 1895	Derby County	H	4–1	5,500	Dickson, Hyslop (3)
26	25 March 1895	West Bromwich Albion	H	1–1	5,100	Dickson
27	30 March 1895	Burnley	H	5–1	3,000	Hyslop, Farrell, Dickson, Schofield (2)
28	13 April 1895	Blackburn Rovers	H	5–1	4,000	Hyslop (2), Farrell, Dickson (2)
29	17 April 1895	The Wednesday	A	4–2	5,000	Hyslop, Schofield, Dickson, Petrie (o.g.)
30	20 April 1895	Burnley	A	2–1	3,000	Naughton, Crabtree (o.g.)

=== Test match ===
Date	Opponent	Venue	Result	Attendance	Scorers
27 April 1895	Newton Heath	N	3–0	4,000	Farrell, Schofield (2)

=== FA Cup ===
Round	Date	Opponent	Venue	Result	Attendance	Scorers
R1	2 February 1895	Newton Heath	A	3–2	9,500	J. Robertson, Meston (2)
R2	16 February 1895	Wolverhampton Wanderers	A	0–2	10,000	

== Squad statistics ==
Pos.	Name	League		FA Cup		Test Match		Total	
Pos.	Name	Apps	Goals	Apps	Goals	Apps	Goals	Apps	Goals
GK	(England) George Clawley	23	0	2	0	1	0	26	0
GK	(England) Bill Rowley	7	0	0	0	0	0	7	0
FB	(England) Tommy Clare	24	0	2	0	1	0	27	0
FB	(England) Jack Eccles	29	0	2	0	0	0	31	0
FB	(England) Arthur Foster	6	0	0	0	0	0	6	0
FB	(England) Edward Steele	0	0	0	0	1	0	1	0
FB	(England) Alf Underwood	1	0	0	0	0	0	1	0
FB	(Scotland) John Walker	0	0	0	0	0	0	0	0
HB	(Scotland) Davy Brodie	29	0	2	0	1	0	32	0
HB	(Scotland) Davy Christie	5	0	0	0	0	0	5	0
HB	(Scotland) Jimmy Dale	4	0	0	0	0	0	4	0
HB	(Scotland) Jimmy Grewer	15	0	2	0	1	0	18	0
HB	(Scotland) Samuel Meston	10	2	2	2	0	0	12	4
HB	(Scotland) Tom Robertson	13	1	0	0	0	0	13	1
HB	(England) Jimmy Turner	26	0	2	0	1	0	29	0
FW	(England) Arthur Brookfield	6	2	2	0	0	0	8	2
FW	(Scotland) Billy Dickson	26	13	2	0	1	0	29	13
FW	(England) Ted Evans	5	0	0	0	0	0	5	0
FW	(England) Jack Farrell	16	6	0	0	1	1	17	7
FW	(England) Billy Heames	10	1	0	0	0	0	10	1
FW	(Scotland) Tommy Hyslop	6	7	0	0	1	0	7	7
FW	(Scotland) Wally McReddie	3	0	0	0	0	0	3	0
FW	(England) Jimmy Mellor	1	0	0	0	0	0	1	0
FW	(Scotland) Willie Naughton	17	3	0	0	1	0	18	3
FW	(Scotland) Jimmie Robertson	8	0	2	1	0	0	10	1
FW	(England) Teddy Sandland	12	2	0	0	0	0	12	2
FW	(England) Joe Schofield	28	11	2	0	1	2	31	13
–	Own goals	–	2	–	0	–	0	–	2
