= 1892–93 Stoke F.C. season =

Stoke
1892–93 season
- Chairman: Mr S. Barker
- Manager: Arthur Reeves
- Stadium: Victoria Ground
- Football League First Division: 7th (29 Points)
- FA Cup: First Round
- Top goalscorer: League: Joe Schofield (13); All: Joe Schofield (13)
- Highest home attendance: 12,000 vs Preston North End (14 November 1892)
- Lowest home attendance: 1,000 vs Newton Heath (7 January 1893)
- Average home league attendance: 5,070
Home colours

The 1892–93 season was Stoke's fourth season in the Football League.

Stoke finally made an improvement in the Football League finishing in 7th position with 29 points. Stoke fielded a settled side all season as just sixteen players were used with five of them playing in every match.

== Season review ==
=== League ===
In 1892–93 Stoke finally made an impression in the Football League and claimed seventh place in the table. They collected 29 points, 11 more than bottom club Newton Heath, but were 19 points behind champions Sunderland. Ted Evans became the first Stoke player to be sent-off in the league when he received his marching orders in an away match at Everton on 12 November 1892, Stoke held out for a 2–2 draw. Throughout the season manager Arthur Reeves was able to field a settled side which included successful Scottish imports Davy Christie, Davy Brodie, Billy Dickson, Willie Naughton and Jimmie Robertson. Stoke went on an eight match unbeaten run through October and November and back to back home 7–1 and 6–0 victories over Newton Heath and Bolton Wanderers respectively the best results in an encouraging campaign for the "Potters".

=== FA Cup ===
There was no joy in the cup as Stoke lost 2–1 to Accrington in the first round. It proved to be the final meeting between the sides as Accrington resigned from the league at the end of the season.

== Final league table ==
| Pos | Team | Pld | W | D | L | GF | GA | GAv | Pts |
|---|---|---|---|---|---|---|---|---|---|
| 5 | Bolton Wanderers | 30 | 13 | 6 | 11 | 56 | 55 | 1.018 | 32 |
| 6 | Burnley | 30 | 13 | 4 | 13 | 51 | 44 | 1.159 | 30 |
| 7 | Stoke | 30 | 12 | 5 | 13 | 58 | 48 | 1.208 | 29 |
| 8 | West Bromwich Albion | 30 | 12 | 5 | 13 | 58 | 69 | 0.841 | 29 |
| 9 | Blackburn Rovers | 30 | 8 | 13 | 9 | 47 | 56 | 0.839 | 29 |

Source: World Football
Rules for classification: 1) Points; 2) Goal average; 3) Goals scored

== Results ==
Stoke's score comes first

=== Legend ===
| Win | Draw | Loss |

=== Football League First Division ===
| Match | Date | Opponent | Venue | Result | Attendance | Scorers |
|---|---|---|---|---|---|---|
| 1 | 3 September 1892 | Derby County | H | 1–3 | 5,000 | Schofield |
| 2 | 10 September 1892 | Nottingham Forest | A | 4–3 | 9,000 | Dunn (2), Turner (2) |
| 3 | 12 September 1892 | Aston Villa | H | 0–1 | 4,500 | |
| 4 | 17 September 1892 | Accrington | H | 2–2 | 9,000 | Schofield, Evans |
| 5 | 24 September 1892 | Burnley | A | 2–3 | 9,000 | Dickson (2) |
| 6 | 1 October 1892 | Sunderland | A | 1–3 | 8,000 | Schofield |
| 7 | 10 October 1892 | Aston Villa | A | 2–3 | 8,000 | Dickson, Evans |
| 8 | 15 October 1892 | Bolton Wanderers | A | 4–4 | 3,500 | Evans (2), Schofield (2) |
| 9 | 22 October 1892 | Nottingham Forest | H | 3–0 | 5,500 | Schofield, Robertson (2) |
| 10 | 29 October 1892 | Wolverhampton Wanderers | H | 2–1 | 5,000 | Robertson (2) |
| 11 | 5 November 1892 | Notts County | A | 1–0 | 10,000 | Robertson |
| 12 | 12 November 1892 | Everton | A | 2–2 | 12,000 | Robertson, Naughton |
| 13 | 14 November 1892 | Preston North End | H | 2–1 | 12,000 | Naughton (2) |
| 14 | 19 November 1892 | Burnley | H | 4–1 | 3,500 | Naughton, Dickson (2), Robertson |
| 15 | 26 November 1892 | West Bromwich Albion | A | 2–1 | 600 | Evans, Schofield |
| 16 | 3 December 1892 | Wolverhampton Wanderers | A | 0–1 | 3,500 | |
| 17 | 17 December 1892 | The Wednesday | H | 2–0 | 5,000 | Dickson, Naughton |
| 18 | 24 December 1892 | Derby County | A | 0–1 | 8,000 | |
| 19 | 26 December 1892 | Accrington | A | 2–5 | 3,000 | Evans (2) |
| 20 | 31 December 1892 | Preston North End | A | 1–2 | 5,500 | Schofield |
| 21 | 7 January 1893 | Newton Heath | H | 7–1 | 1,000 | Dickson (3), Robertson (2), Schofield, Edge |
| 22 | 14 January 1893 | Bolton Wanderers | H | 6–0 | 4,500 | Robertson, Evans (3), Proctor, Sommerville (o.g.) |
| 23 | 28 January 1893 | Everton | H | 0–1 | 5,000 | |
| 24 | 11 February 1893 | West Bromwich Albion | H | 1–2 | 6,000 | Naughton |
| 25 | 25 February 1893 | Blackburn Rovers | A | 3–3 | 3,500 | Schofield (3) |
| 26 | 11 March 1893 | Notts County | H | 1–0 | 4,500 | Robertson |
| 27 | 18 March 1893 | Sunderland | H | 0–1 | 10,000 | |
| 28 | 31 March 1893 | Newton Heath | A | 0–1 | 10,000 | |
| 29 | 1 April 1893 | The Wednesday | A | 1–0 | 5,000 | Dickson |
| 30 | 3 April 1893 | Blackburn Rovers | H | 2–2 | 8,000 | Schofield, Dickson |

=== FA Cup ===
| Round | Date | Opponent | Venue | Result | Attendance | Scorers |
|---|---|---|---|---|---|---|
| R1 | 21 January 1893 | Accrington | A | 1–2 | 4,000 | Brodie |

== Squad statistics ==
| Pos. | Name | League | | FA Cup | | Total | |
| Pos. | Name | Apps | Goals | Apps | Goals | Apps | Goals |
|---|---|---|---|---|---|---|---|
| GK | (England) Leon Boullemier | 0 | 0 | 0 | 0 | 0 | 0 |
| GK | (England) Bill Rowley | 30 | 0 | 1 | 0 | 31 | 0 |
| FB | (England) Tommy Clare | 30 | 0 | 1 | 0 | 31 | 0 |
| FB | (England) Lachie Thomson | 7 | 0 | 0 | 0 | 7 | 0 |
| FB | (England) Alf Underwood | 26 | 0 | 1 | 0 | 27 | 0 |
| HB | (Scotland) Davy Brodie | 30 | 0 | 1 | 1 | 31 | 1 |
| HB | (Scotland) Davy Christie | 27 | 0 | 1 | 0 | 28 | 0 |
| HB | (England) Jack Proctor | 30 | 1 | 1 | 0 | 31 | 1 |
| FW | (England) Charlie Baker | 4 | 0 | 0 | 0 | 4 | 0 |
| FW | (Scotland) Billy Dickson | 30 | 11 | 1 | 0 | 31 | 11 |
| FW | (Scotland) Billy Dunn | 5 | 2 | 0 | 0 | 5 | 2 |
| FW | (England) Alf Edge | 1 | 1 | 0 | 0 | 1 | 1 |
| FW | (England) Ted Evans | 25 | 10 | 1 | 0 | 26 | 10 |
| FW | (Scotland) Danny McLaren | 1 | 0 | 0 | 0 | 1 | 0 |
| FW | (Scotland) Willie Naughton | 24 | 6 | 1 | 0 | 25 | 6 |
| FW | (Scotland) Jimmie Robertson | 26 | 11 | 1 | 0 | 27 | 11 |
| FW | (England) Joe Schofield | 29 | 13 | 1 | 0 | 30 | 13 |
| FW | (England) Wilmot Turner | 5 | 2 | 0 | 0 | 5 | 2 |
| – | Own goals | – | 1 | – | 0 | – | 1 |
