= Arthur Brookfield =

English footballer

Personal information
- Full name: Arthur Brookfield
- Date of birth: 1870
- Place of birth: Stoke-upon-Trent, England
- Date of death: 1930
- Position: Outside right

Senior career*
Years	Team	Apps	(Gls)
1894	Longton Atlas		
1894–1895	Stoke	8	(2)
1895–1900	Crewe Alexandra	0	(0)
- * Club domestic league appearances and goals

Arthur Brookfield (1870–1930) was an English footballer who played in the Football League for Stoke.

== Career ==
Brookfield was born in Stoke-upon-Trent and played for Longton Atlas before joining Stoke in 1894. He played eight matches for Stoke during the 1894–95 season scoring twice against Bolton Wanderers. He managed just two appearances in 1895–96 and left for Crewe Alexandra.

== Career statistics ==
Appearances and goals by club, season and competition
Club	Season	League			FA Cup		Total	
Club	Season	Division	Apps	Goals	Apps	Goals	Apps	Goals
Stoke	1894–95	First Division	6	2	2	0	8	2
Stoke	1895–96	First Division	2	0	0	0	2	0
Career Total			8	2	2	0	10	2
