= Jimmy Owen =

English footballer

Personal information
- Date of birth: 1864
- Place of birth: Manchester, England
- Position: Forward

Senior career*
Years	Team	Apps	(Gls)
1884–1886	Port Vale	0	(0)
1888–1890	Stoke	3	(2)
- * Club domestic league appearances and goals

Jimmy Owen (born 1864; date of death unknown) was an English footballer for Port Vale and Stoke during the 1880s.

== Career ==
Owen probably joined Port Vale in 1884. His debut for the club came on 18 October 1884 in a home friendly with Aston Villa "A", which Vale won 2–0. He became a regular in the side and grabbed two goals in the 12–0 thrashing of Ironbridge in the Burslem Challenge Cup final on 21 March 1885. He also played in the North Staffordshire Charity Challenge Cup final that same year but departed at the end of the 1885–86 season to join Stoke, a founder club of the Football League in 1888. He had scored 17 goals in 56 games across all competitions for Port Vale.

He played for Stoke during the 1889–90 season, scoring two goals in three Football League matches. He scored goals against West Bromwich Albion (15 March) and Notts County (24 March).

== Career statistics ==
Appearances and goals by club, season and competition
Club	Season	League			FA Cup		Total	
Club	Season	Division	Apps	Goals	Apps	Goals	Apps	Goals
Stoke	1889–90	The Football League	3	2	0	0	3	2
Career total			3	2	0	0	3	2

== Honours ==
Port Vale

- Burslem Challenge Cup: 1885
- North Staffordshire Charity Challenge Cup: 1885 (shared)
