= Harry Simpson (footballer, born 1869) =

Scottish footballer

Personal information
- Full name: Harry Simpson
- Date of birth: 1869
- Place of birth: Falkirk, Scotland
- Position: Left winger

Senior career*
Years	Team	Apps	(Gls)
1888–1889	East Stirlingshire		
1889–1890	Stoke	10	(3)
1890	Forfar Athletic		
- * Club domestic league appearances and goals

Harry Simpson (born 1869) was a Scottish footballer who played in the Football League for Stoke.

== Career ==
Simpson played for his local club East Stirlingshire when in 1889 he moved down to England to play for Stoke along with teammate Billy Dunn. Simpson played in 12 competitive games and scored 3 goals before returning to Scotland in 1890 to play for Forfar Athletic.

== Personal life ==
He was the uncle of England footballer Jock Simpson and the grandfather of Australia cricketer Bob Simpson.

== Career statistics ==
Appearances and goals by club, season and competition
Club	Season	League			FA Cup		Total	
Club	Season	Division	Apps	Goals	Apps	Goals	Apps	Goals
Stoke	1889–90	The Football League	10	3	2	0	12	3
Career total			10	3	2	0	12	3
