= Freddie Gee =

English footballer (1872–1943)

Personal information
- Full name: Fredrick Gee
- Date of birth: 23 June 1872
- Place of birth: Handsworth, Birmingham, England
- Date of death: 1943
- Place of death: Birmingham, England
- Position: Centre forward

Senior career*
Years	Team	Apps	(Gls)
1887	Edgbaston		
1888–1889	Stoke	17	(4)
1890	Pershore Swifts		
1891	King's Heath		
- * Club domestic league appearances and goals

Fredrick Gee (23 June 1872 – 1943) was an English footballer who played in the Football League for Stoke.

== Career ==
Born in Handsworth, Birmingham, Gee joined Stoke from Edgbaston at the end of the 1888–89 season and played in the final match away at Accrington. He played in 21 matches and scored five goals for Stoke before leaving at the end of the 1889–90 season.

== Career statistics ==
Appearances and goals by club, season and competition
Club	Season	League			FA Cup		Total	
Club	Season	Division	Apps	Goals	Apps	Goals	Apps	Goals
Stoke	1888–89	The Football League	1	0	0	0	1	0
Stoke	1889–90	The Football League	16	4	4	1	20	5
Career Total			17	4	4	1	21	5
