= Danny McLaren =

Scottish footballer

Personal information
- Full name: Daniel McLaren
- Date of birth: 1870
- Place of birth: Lochee, Scotland
- Date of death: Unknown
- Position: Center forward

Senior career*
Years	Team	Apps	(Gls)
1890	Lochee		
1891	Royal Arsenal		
1892–1893	Stoke	1	(0)
- * Club domestic league appearances and goals

Daniel McLaren (1870–unknown) was a Scottish footballer who played in the Football League for Stoke.

== Career ==
McLaren was born in Lochee and played football with the local side before moving south to Royal Arsenal in 1891. He joined Stoke in 1892–93 and played mainly for the reserve side in The Combination. McLaren made one appearance in the Football League which came in a 3–2 defeat at Burnley on 24 September 1892, taking the place of the injured Wilmot Turner.

== Career statistics ==
Club	Season	League			FA Cup		Total	
Club	Season	Division	Apps	Goals	Apps	Goals	Apps	Goals
Stoke	1892–93	First Division	1	0	0	0	1	0
Career Total			1	0	0	0	1	0
