= Bill Rowley =

English footballer (1865–1939)

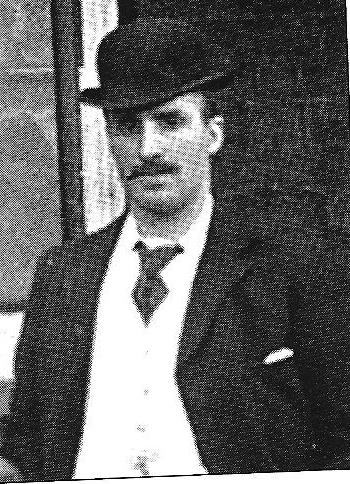

Personal information
- Full name: William Spencer Rowley
- Date of birth: 11 September 1865
- Place of birth: Hanley, England
- Date of death: 16 March 1934 (aged 68)
- Place of death: Longton, Stoke-on-Trent, England
- Height: 5 ft 9 in (1.75 m)
- Position: Goalkeeper

Youth career
- Hanley Orion

Senior career*
Years	Team	Apps	(Gls)
1883–1884	Stoke	0	(0)
1884–1886	Burslem Port Vale	0	(0)
1887–1896	Stoke	124	(0)
1898	Leicester Fosse	1	(0)

International career
1889–1892	England	2	(0)
	Football League	1	(0)

Managerial career
- 1895–1897: Stoke
- * Club domestic league appearances and goals

William Spencer Rowley (11 September 1865 – 16 March 1934) was an English footballer who played as goalkeeper for Stoke in the 1880s and 1890s, also making two appearances for England. He later became Stoke's manager between 1895 and 1897.

He played for Burslem Port Vale before joining Stoke in 1887. He played in the first-ever season of the English Football League before helping the "Potters" to the Football Alliance title in 1890–91. He also won England caps in 1889 and 1892. After struggling with injuries, he was appointed player-manager at Stoke in 1896 and took the club to sixth in the league. However, he left the game for good after being censored for arranging his own transfer to Leicester Fosse in August 1898.

== Early and personal life ==
William Spencer Rowley was born on 11 September 1865 in Hanley. His father, Charles, a clerk, was widowed following the death of 33-year-old Sarah (née Stevenson) in 1870. He worked in the pottery industry. He married dressmaker Ellen Rhodes on 29 April 1893 in Edensor. They had ten children together, including Ellen (1893–1901), William Spencer (stillborn mid-1895), Annie (born 1897), Spencer (born 1902) and another William (born 1908). In 1890, Rowley played professional baseball for Stoke in the National League of Baseball of Great Britain.

== Career ==
Rowley was born in Hanley and started his professional career playing in Stoke's reserve team as a forward in August 1883. He switched to goalkeeping and joined local rivals Burslem Port Vale in April 1884.

=== Burslem Port Vale ===
Immediately establishing himself as the first-choice goalkeeper, he played 66 games in his two-and-a-half years with the club. He even scored a goal, being one of the scorers in a 12–0 rout of Ironbridge in the final of the 1885 Burslem Challenge Cup. He was called up to the England national team for the match against Ireland in 1886, to act as William Rose's reserve.

He broke a rib in a 3–1 friendly defeat at Stoke on 1 May 1886, and as a result, Vale successfully sued Stoke in county court, forcing Stoke to pay £20 to charity. Nevertheless, he signed with Stoke in early 1887. This move came after he signed a contract to play exclusively for the Vale and, despite the case being upheld in a Burslem court, Vale allowed him to leave for Stoke in December 1886.

=== Stoke ===
Rowley was a member of the Stoke side that were founder members of the English Football League in 1888. He made his league debut on 8 September 1888, keeping goal for Stoke in a 2–0 defeat by West Bromwich Albion at the Victoria Ground. He played 21 of Stoke's 22 Football League matches and kept three clean sheets whilst restricting the opposition to a single goal on four occasions. Stoke finished at the bottom of the table in both 1888–89 and 1889–90 and in 1890 dropped down to the Football Alliance. The following season, Stoke were champions of the Football Alliance and returned to the Football League, where they once again struggled, finishing second last in 1891–92, before finishing in mid-table in 1892–93.

He was a virtual ever-present throughout his first six years with Stoke, and his form earned him a call into the national team for the match against Ireland on 2 March 1889. The match was played at Anfield, then the home of Everton, and the selectors made eleven changes to the side that had beaten Wales a week before with nine new caps, including Rowley's Stoke teammate, Tommy Clare at right-back. England won the match "quite comfortably" 6–1, with Jack Yates scoring a hat-trick in his only international appearance.

Rowley's only other England appearance came three years later, also against Ireland, at the Solitude Ground, Belfast, when he was joined by his Stoke teammates Tommy Clare and Alf Underwood as the two full-backs. Harry Daft of Notts County marked the occasion by scoring twice, either side of half-time, in an "unconvincing victory".

Some serious injuries interrupted his career, with Tom Cain taking over in goal for most of the 1893–94 season. Although Rowley recovered his place for the next season, he suffered from further injuries, including a broken breastbone, with George Clawley replacing him. Clawley now established himself as first-choice 'keeper, and in his final three seasons at the Victoria Ground, Rowley managed only twelve further League appearances.

In 1896, he ceased playing and became Stoke's player-manager, a position he held for two years. He guided Stoke to their highest league position to that point of sixth in the 1895–96 season and 13th in his second season in charge. In September 1897, Horace Austerberry was appointed secretary-manager of Stoke, and Rowley was made general secretary. A charismatic wheeler-dealer, Rowley often paid transfer fees from his own pockets and even took Alan Maxwell from Darwen in exchange for a set of wrought iron gates.

In August 1898, Rowley transferred himself to Leicester Fosse and even agreed on his own signing-on fee. This transaction caused uproar by the FA, who suspended Rowley resulting in his retirement.

== Style of play ==
He was described as a "brave and cool goalkeeper", and as "a fine and fearless goalkeeper with an enormous kick. Rowley handled the ball well and was never afraid to go in where it hurts (when the legs and boots were flying)."

Rowley picked up numerous injuries from his fearless play in defending his goal from sometimes violent attackers, and his resilience made him a popular figure with football supporters across the country. Despite this, he was often criticised for his poor distribution skills. He could withstand kicks and brutal charges only to throw or kick the ball to the opposition.

== Career statistics ==
=== Club ===
Appearances and goals by club, season and competition
Club	Season	League			FA Cup		Total	
Club	Season	Division	Apps	Goals	Apps	Goals	Apps	Goals
Stoke	1886–87	–	–		1	0	1	0
Stoke	1887–88	–	–		4	0	4	0
Stoke	1888–89	The Football League	21	0	0	0	21	0
Stoke	1889–90	The Football League	21	0	3	0	24	0
Stoke	1890–91	Football Alliance	6	0	0	0	6	0
Stoke	1891–92	The Football League	24	0	5	0	29	0
Stoke	1892–93	First Division	30	0	1	0	31	0
Stoke	1893–94	First Division	10	0	2	0	12	0
Stoke	1894–95	First Division	7	0	0	0	7	0
Stoke	1895–96	First Division	1	0	0	0	1	0
Stoke	1896–97	First Division	4	0	0	0	4	0
Stoke	Total		124	0	16	0	140	0
Leicester Fosse	1897–98	Second Division	1	0	0	0	1	0
Career total			125	0	16	0	141	0

=== International ===
Appearances and goals by national team and year
National team	Year	Apps	Goals
England	1889	1	0
England	1892	1	0
Total		2	0

=== Managerial ===
Managerial record by club and tenure
Team	From	To	Record				
Team	From	To	P	W	D	L	Win %
Stoke	August 1895	May 1897	66	29	4	33	43.9
Total			66	29	4	33	43.9

== Honours ==
Burslem Port Vale

- Burslem Challenge Cup: 1885
- North Staffordshire Charity Challenge Cup: 1885 (shared)

Stoke

- Football Alliance: 1890–91

England

- British Home Championship: 1891–92
