= Jimmy Dale (footballer) =

Scottish footballer (1869–1948)

Personal information
- Full name: John Dale
- Date of birth: July qtr. 1870
- Place of birth: Audley, Staffordshire, England
- Date of death: January qtr. 1948 (aged 77)
- Place of death: Stoke on Trent, England
- Position: Half-back

Senior career*
Years	Team	Apps	(Gls)
1893–1894	Sunderland	0	(0)
1894–1895	Stoke	4	(0)
1895	Southampton St Mary's	3	(0)
1895–????	Audley Town		
- * Club domestic league appearances and goals

John "Jimmy" Dale (1870–1948) was an English footballer, who played for Stoke and Southampton St Mary's in the 1890s.

== Football career ==
Dale was born in Audley, Staffordshire,^{a} and started his football career with Sunderland in January 1893. He failed to break into Sunderland's first-team and returned to Staffordshire to join Stoke of the Football League First Division in June 1894.

At Stoke, he made four League appearances all of which came during the first month of the 1894–95 season before moving to the south coast to join Southampton St Mary's of the Southern League in October 1895, following several players, including Jack Farrell, Willie Naughton and Samuel Meston, who had moved in the summer together with Stoke's trainer, Bill Dawson.

He made his debut for the "Saints" on 19 October 1895, taking the place of Ernie Taylor at right-half for the visit of Clapton to the Antelope Ground. The match ended in a 7–3 "thrashing" by Clapton and after two further league matches and two in the FA Cup, Dale returned to Staffordshire, where he played for his local club, Audley Town, and worked in the coal mines.

== Career statistics ==
Appearances and goals by club, season and competition
Club	Season	League			FA Cup		Total	
Club	Season	Division	Apps	Goals	Apps	Goals	Apps	Goals
Stoke	1894–95	First Division	4	0	0	0	4	0
Southampton St Mary's	1895–96	Southern League	3	0	2	0	5	0
Career total			7	0	2	0	9	0

== Notes ==
- ^a Some older sources show that Dale was born in Motherwell, Scotland in July 1869.
