= Hughie Odgers =

Australian rules footballer

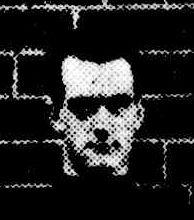

Personal information
- Full name: Hugh Fielding Odgers
- Born: 21 December 1889; Hawthorn, Victoria
- Died: 9 April 1958 (aged 68); Petersham, New South Wales
- Original team: Brighton
- Height: 180 cm (5 ft 11 in)
- Position: Utility

Playing career^{1}
Years	Club	Games (Goals)
1909–12, 1920	Melbourne	59 (2)
- ^{1} Playing statistics correct to the end of 1920.

Hughie Odgers (21 December 1889 – 9 April 1958) was an Australian rules footballer who played with Melbourne in the Victorian Football League (VFL).
