= Michael Huey =

Michael Huey may refer to:

- Michael Huey (musician) (born 1950), American musician
- Michael Huey (artist) (born 1964), American artist
- Michael Huey (American football) (born 1988), American football player
