= Barley Bank =

Former cricket and football ground in Darwen, England

- Former location in Blackburn with Darwen
- Location: Darwen, England
- Coordinates: 53.7019°N 2.4783°W
- Surface: Grass
- Record attendance: 14,000

Tenants
- Darwen C.C. Darwen F.C.

Barley Bank was a cricket and football ground in Darwen in England. It was the home ground of Darwen F.C. during their time in the Football League.

== History ==
Barley Bank was originally the home of Darwen Cricket Club, with football being played on a pitch in the north-west corner of the ground. Spectator facilities included a 1,200-seat covered stand on the western touchline with an embankment running the remainder of the length of the pitch on that side. During the football season, a temporary stand was erected on the eastern side of the pitch, with tents in the south-east corner of the ground used for dressing rooms.

The ground's record attendance of 14,000 was set for a friendly match with local rivals Blackburn Rovers on 18 March 1882. Darwen joined the Football League in 1891, which at that stage consisted of a single division. The first League match played at Barley Bank was a 2–1 defeat by Bolton Wanderers in front of 7,000 spectators. On 22 February 1896, the club was forced to play a League match on the cricket pitch due to the poor condition of the football pitch; a crowd of just 300 saw them draw 1–1 with Loughborough.

At the end of the 1898–99 season Darwen were voted out of the Football League. The final match at Barley Bank was a 1–1 draw with Newton Heath with 1,000 spectators present. The club joined the Lancashire League and moved to Anchor Ground, taking Barley Bank's main stand with them. The ground was later used for housing.
