= 1892–93 Northwich Victoria F.C. season =

Northwich Victoria
1892–93 season
- Stadium: Drill Field
- Division Two: 7th
- FA Cup: Second round
- Cheshire Senior Cup: Semi-final
- Biggest win: 7–0 vs Flint, FA Cup
- Biggest defeat: 0–6 vs Small Heath, Second Division
Home colours

The 1892–93 season was Northwich Victoria's first season in the Football League. They competed in the newly formed 12 team Football League Second Division, for which they were a founding member. The league was then the second tier of English football, where they finished in seventh-place.

== Season synopsis ==
The season began on 3 September 1892, when Northwich played Grimsby Town, losing 2–1. Losing a further two games, it was not until 24 September when Northwich gained their first points in a 1–1 draw at Manchester City.

== Table ==
Pos	Team	Pld	W	D	L	GF	GA	GAv	Pts	Qualification or relegation
1	Small Heath (C)	22	17	2	3	90	35	2.571	36	Qualification for test matches
2	Sheffield United (O, P)	22	16	3	3	62	19	3.263	35	Qualification for test matches
3	Darwen (O, P)	22	14	2	6	60	36	1.667	30	Qualification for test matches
4	Grimsby Town	22	11	1	10	42	41	1.024	23	
5	Ardwick	22	9	3	10	45	40	1.125	21	
6	Burton Swifts	22	9	2	11	47	47	1.000	20	
7	Northwich Victoria	22	9	2	11	42	58	0.724	20	
8	Bootle (Note: Bootle was liquidated at the end of the season.)	22	8	3	11	49	63	0.778	19	Resigned from league
9	Lincoln City	22	7	3	12	45	51	0.882	17	Re-elected
10	Crewe Alexandra	22	6	3	13	42	69	0.609	15	Re-elected
11	Burslem Port Vale	22	6	3	13	30	57	0.526	15	Re-elected
12	Walsall Town Swifts	22	5	3	14	37	75	0.493	13	Re-elected

Rules for classification: 1) Points; 2) Goal average; 3) Goals scored
(C) Champions; (O) Play-off winners; (P) Promoted

== FA Cup results ==
Date	Round	Opponents	H / A	Result F – A
15 October 1892	Round 1 Qualifying	Macclesfield Town	H	4–0
29 October 1892	Round 2 Qualifying	Flint	H	7–0
19 November 1892	Round 3 Qualifying	Liverpool	H	2–1
10 December 1892	Round 4 Qualifying	Liverpool Caledonians	A	3–2
21 January 1893	Round 1 Proper	Loughborough	A	2–1
4 February 1893	Round 2 Proper	Blackburn Rovers	A	1–4
