= Dresden United F.C. =

Dresden United
- Full name: Dresden United Football Club
- Founded: 1884
- Dissolved: 1898
- Ground: Cocknage Ground
- Secretary: D. Cashmore
- 1897–98: The Combination – Record expunged
Home colours	Change colours

Dresden United Football Club was a football club based in the Dresden area of Stoke-on-Trent who were active at the end of the nineteenth century.

== History ==
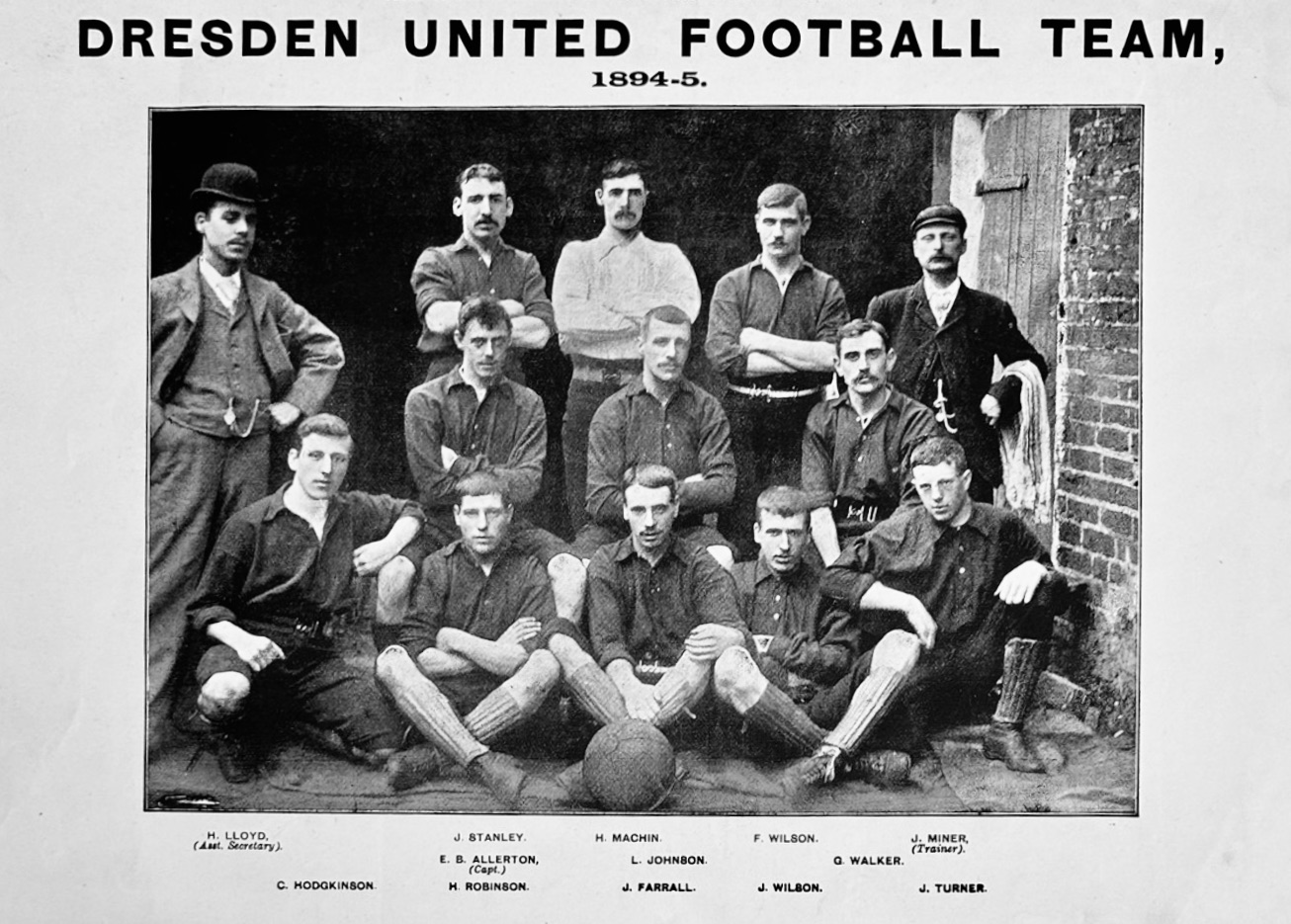
Dresden United FC, 1894–95, Staffordshire Sentinel, 20 October 1894

The earliest reference to the club is from the 1884–85 season.

In 1892, the club was elected to the Combination, where it spent three seasons finishing seventh, fifth and fourth respectively. In 1895, it left the Combination and took up a place in the Midland League. In its two seasons in the Midland League, the club managed finishes in eleventh and tenth place (out of fifteen).

The club entered the FA Cup for the first time in 1895–96 and lost in the first qualifying round at fellow Midland League side Walsall, the only goal coming when goalkeeper Cheetham mishandled a long shot over the line. The two clubs met again the following season, this time in the third qualifying round, albeit Dresden had had a bye and a walkover (after Kidderminster Harriers was unable to raise a team) to reach that stage. Dresden went into the game in fine form, having won 6 of its 7 Midland League matches, but a sign of the club's impending financial difficulty was that United sold its home advantage to the Saddlers "for a consideration", to alleviate "the guarantors who have been laying out their money for some years". From a sporting perspective, the decision was a disaster, Walsall scoring 11 goals without reply, and three being disallowed for offside.

In 1897, Dresden returned to the Combination but was unable to complete the season, having been suspended at the end of 1897, for not being able to pay a £10 deposit when the league demanded it; United was unable to re-start operations and was dissolved in the New Year, its league record being expunged. At the time of resignation, Dresden was bottom of the table, with 1 win and 2 draws from its 12 games, albeit the club had not been humiliated, only having conceded 26 goals in 12 games - a better defensive record than Wrexham, which was 4th in the table.

== Colours ==
The club wore red jerseys. Its change jerseys were sky blue and black.

== Ground ==
The club's ground was at Cocknage Road.

== Notable figures ==
- Notable players ( 11 )
- Alderman Alfred Brookhouse, club secretary when applying to the Combination, was also the secretary for the Stoke Swifts (the Stoke F.C. reserve club).

Several players from Dresden joined the local Football League clubs, Port Vale or Stoke, including Jack Farrell who left Dresden to join Stoke in 1894. He later played for Southampton, appearing in the 1900 FA Cup Final.

Joe Turner started his career at Dresden before joining Southampton in 1895; he appeared in the 1902 FA Cup Final and also played for Everton.
