= 1893–94 Northwich Victoria F.C. season =

Northwich Victoria
1893–94 season
- Division Two: 15th
- FA Cup: Second qualifying round
- Cheshire Senior Cup: Semi-final
- Biggest win: 5–3 vs Newcastle United, Second Division
- Biggest defeat: 0–8 vs Small Heath, Second Division
Home colours

The 1893–94 season was Northwich Victoria's second, and final season in the Football League. They competed in the 15 team Football League Second Division, which they had been a founding member of the previous season. The league was then the second tier of English football, where they finished 15th. Northwich were eliminated from the 1893–94 FA Cup in the fourth qualifying round, after being beaten 1–0 at home by Crewe Alexandra.

== Season synopsis ==
The season began for Northwich on 2 September 1893, away to Grimsby Town, where they were convincingly defeated 7–0.

On 3 February 1894, Northwich met Liverpool for the first time since beating them in the FA Cup the previous season, meeting this time in the League. Liverpool won the game convincingly 4-0 in front of 3,000 spectators at Anfield, with goals from Thomas Bradshaw, Duncan McClean and two goals from James Stott.

Northwich's return fixture against Liverpool was played on 28 March at the Drill Field, again in front of around 3,000 spectators. Failing to make amends for the earlier season defeat, Northwich were beaten 3-2.

== First-team squad ==
This is the squad who faced Liverpool F.C. on 3 February 1894.

Note: Flags indicate national team as defined under FIFA eligibility rules; some limited exceptions apply. Players may hold more than one non-FIFA nationality.

Pos.	Nation	Player
GK		Hornby
DF		Postles
DF		Scanlon
DF		Clarke
DF		Guest
DF		Barlow
FW		Drinkwater
FW	ENG	Pat Finnerhan
FW		Eyres
FW		Gallimore
FW		Hatton

Below are other players who played for Northwich during this season.

Note: Flags indicate national team as defined under FIFA eligibility rules; some limited exceptions apply. Players may hold more than one non-FIFA nationality.

Pos.	Nation	Player
FW	WAL	Billy Meredith

== Table ==
Pos	Team	Pld	W	D	L	GF	GA	GAv	Pts	Qualification or relegation
1	Liverpool (C, O, P)	28	22	6	0	77	18	4.278	50	Qualification for test matches
2	Small Heath (O, P)	28	21	0	7	103	44	2.341	42	Qualification for test matches
3	Notts County	28	18	3	7	70	31	2.258	39	Qualification for test matches
4	Newcastle United	28	15	6	7	66	39	1.692	36	
5	Grimsby Town	28	15	2	11	71	58	1.224	32	
6	Burton Swifts	28	14	3	11	79	61	1.295	31	
7	Burslem Port Vale	28	13	4	11	66	64	1.031	30	
8	Lincoln City	28	11	6	11	59	58	1.017	28	
9	Woolwich Arsenal	28	12	4	12	52	55	0.945	28	
10	Walsall Town Swifts	28	10	3	15	51	61	0.836	23	
11	Middlesbrough Ironopolis (Note: Middlesbrough Ironopolis was liquidated at the end of the season.)	28	8	4	16	37	72	0.514	20	Dissolved
12	Crewe Alexandra	28	6	7	15	42	73	0.575	19	
13	Ardwick	28	8	2	18	47	71	0.662	18	Re-elected
14	Rotherham Town	28	6	3	19	44	91	0.484	15	Re-elected
15	Northwich Victoria (R)	28	3	3	22	30	98	0.306	9	Resigned from league

Rules for classification: 1) Points; 2) Goal average; 3) Goals scored
(C) Champions; (O) Play-off winners; (P) Promoted; (R) Relegated
