= 1890–91 Football Alliance =

Football Alliance
- Season: 1890–91
- Champions: Stoke
- Matches: 132
- Goals: 630 (4.77 per match)
- Top goalscorer: ?
- Biggest home win: Sunderland Albion – Walsall Town Swifts 11–1
- Biggest away win: Crewe Alexandra – Nottingham Forest 0–7
- Highest scoring: Sunderland Albion – Walsall Town Swifts 11–1

The 1890–91 Football Alliance was the second season of the Football Alliance, an association football league which was set up in England as an alternative to the Football League, which had begun in the 1888–89 season.

Stoke joined the Alliance in this season after dropping out of the Football League at the end of the previous season and were crowned champions after the penultimate round of fixtures on 4 April. Last season's champions The Wednesday finished bottom after losing thirteen games in a dreadful season. Even a 4–2 win (3–0 at half time) at home to runners up Sunderland Albion on the last day of the season failed to lift Wednesday off the foot of the table.

At the end of the season, Stoke were elected back to the Football League along with sixth-placed Darwen, while Sunderland Albion left to join the Northern League.

== Final league table ==
Locations of the 1890–91 Football Alliance teams

Pos	Team	Pld	W	D	L	GF	GA	GAv	Pts	Qualification or relegation
1	Stoke (C, E)	22	13	7	2	57	39	1.462	33	Elected to the Football League
2	Sunderland Albion	22	12	6	4	69	28	2.464	30	Left to join the Northern League
3	Grimsby Town	22	11	5	6	43	27	1.593	27	
4	Birmingham St George's	22	12	2	8	64	62	1.032	26	
5	Nottingham Forest	22	9	7	6	66	39	1.692	23 (Note: Nottingham Forest were deducted two points for fielding an unregistered player.)	
6	Darwen (E)	22	10	3	9	64	59	1.085	23	Elected to the Football League
7	Walsall Town Swifts	22	9	3	10	34	61	0.557	21	
8	Crewe Alexandra	22	8	4	10	59	67	0.881	20	
9	Newton Heath	22	7	3	12	37	55	0.673	17	
10	Small Heath	22	7	2	13	58	66	0.879	16	
11	Bootle	22	3	7	12	40	61	0.656	13	
12	The Wednesday	22	4	5	13	39	66	0.591	13	

Rules for classification: 1) points; 2) goal average.
(C) Champions; (E) Elected to the Football League

== Results ==
Home \ Away	BSG	BOO	CRE	DRW	GRI	NWH	NOT	SMH	STK	SUA	WAL	WED
Birmingham St George's		5–1	4–2	1–0	2–0	6–1	6–3	5–4	5–2	1–4	1–2	5–3
Bootle	4–4		1–1	0–1	0–0	5–0	1–5	1–1	2–2	3–3	6–1	5–0
Crewe Alexandra	1–4	8–3		2–1	4–3	0–1	0–7	6–2	2–4	2–2	1–2	2–0
Darwen	5–2	3–1	1–3		1–1	2–1	4–4	5–3	3–3	5–1	9–0	7–1
Grimsby Town	5–2	1–0	3–3	4–1		3–1	3–0	3–1	1–1	2–0	3–0	3–0
Newton Heath	1–3	2–1	6–3	4–2	3–1		1–1	3–1	0–1	1–5	3–3	1–1
Nottingham Forest	4–0	7–0	5–2	5–2	1–1	8–2		4–5	2–2	1–1	2–0	0–0
Small Heath	1–4	7–1	4–3	3–4	1–2	2–1	4–2		5–1	0–3	0–1	7–1
Stoke	6–3	2–1	2–2	6–2	2–1	2–1	2–1	4–2		1–1	1–0	5–1
Sunderland Albion	8–0	4–1	7–0	5–0	2–1	2–1	0–0	4–0	1–1		11–1	3–1
Walsall Town Swifts	1–1	3–2	1–6	2–3	0–1	2–1	3–2	5–2	1–3	2–0		2–1
The Wednesday	4–0	1–1	4–6	7–3	2–1	1–2	0–2	3–3	2–4	4–2	2–2	

Legend: Blue = home team win; Yellow = draw; Red = away team win.

== Election to the Football League ==
The number of clubs in the Football League was to be increased by two for the 1891–92 season. In addition to the four League sides seeking re-election, six non-league clubs (five of them from the Football Alliance) also sought League membership. The voting went as follows:

Team	Votes	Result
Accrington	8	Re-elected to the League
Aston Villa	8	Re-elected to the League
Darwen	7	Elected to the League
Stoke	7	Elected to the League
Derby County	6	Re-elected to the League
West Bromwich Albion	6	Re-elected to the League
Ardwick	4	Not elected to the League
Nottingham Forest	1	Not elected to the League
Sunderland Albion	1	Not elected to the League
Newton Heath	0	Not elected to the League

== See also ==
- 1890–91 in English football
- 1890 in association football
- 1891 in association football
