= Football Alliance =

- Founded: 1889
- Folded: 1892
- Country: England
- Number of clubs: 12

The Football Alliance was an association football league in England which ran for three seasons, from 1889–90 to 1891–92.

== History ==
In 1888, the same year the Football League was founded, The Combination was established by clubs who had been excluded from the Football League, initiated by Crewe Alexandra secretary J. G. Hall, and announced at the Royal Hotel in Crewe. However, while the Football League quickly proved a success, the Combination lacked central organisation, with poor planning and unfulfilled fixtures, and failed to complete its first season, finishing in April 1889 without a winner.

=== Foundation ===
Several of The Combination founders met after the final Combination board meeting to discuss a new combination; four of those who agreed in principle to form a new league, South Shore, Burslem Port Vale, Notts Rangers, and Derby Midland, did not in fact do so, while Grimsby Town, originally considered too distant, was brought back into the fold. The remaining clubs then established the Football Alliance, to begin in the 1889–90 season. The Alliance covered a similar area to the League, stretching from the English Midlands to the North West, but also further east in Sheffield, Grimsby and Sunderland. The president of the Football Alliance was John Holmes, also the president of The Wednesday who were the first champions winning fifteen games out of twenty-two.

The nine founder clubs (eight bolded in the table below) originally decided to form the Alliance, originally under the name of the Northern Counties League, and considered applications from 6 clubs to fill the remaining three places. Crewe Alexandra, Nottingham Forest, and Walsall Town Swifts were elected in the ballot, with Long Eaton Rangers, Halliwell, and Witton missing out. The clubs attended a meeting at the Midland Hotel in Derby in May 1889 to arrange fixtures, but, as Sunderland did not attend, it was assumed Sunderland did not intend to play; and Witton, South Shore, Burslem Port Vale, Derby Midland, Halliwell, and Long Eaton Rangers applied to join in its place. After Long Eaton Rangers and Witton tied in the voting, the casting vote of the chairman (Harry Mitchell of Mitchell St George's) was in favour of the Rangers.

=== Alliance seasons ===
At the end of the Alliance's first season, in accordance with the rules agreed at the start of the season, the bottom four clubs – Walsall Town Swifts, Small Heath, Long Eaton Rangers, and Nottingham Forest – had to apply for re-election, and, unlike the rule in the Football League the previous season, they were not allowed to vote; seven clubs (Stoke, Witton, South Shore, Chester, Burslem Port Vale, Sheffield United, and Lincoln City) applied for admission. Stoke, who had just failed re-election to the Football League, was admitted in place of Long Eaton Rangers, and the other bottom four clubs were re-elected. The prizes awarded to the champions included a blue silk flag, with a white border, 12 feet by 6 feet, with the words "Alliance Champions" on it.

The following year, Stoke and Darwen, another Alliance club, were accepted into the Football League, taking its membership to 14 clubs. Stoke's biggest challenge in winning the title was the threat of expulsion from the Alliance, as Stoke had arranged a friendly with League club Notts County which clashed with an Alliance match at Nottingham Forest, and refused to pay the £10 fine imposed for so doing.

At the end of the 1890–91 season, Sunderland Albion resigned in protest at having to pay half of the train fare of visiting clubs, and the bottom four clubs were re-elected back into the Alliance. To fill the three vacancies, eight clubs applied; Ardwick, Bury, Burton Swifts, Gainsborough Trinity, Middlesbrough, Northwich Victoria, Lincoln City, and Sheffield United. The successful clubs were Ardwick, Burton Swifts, and Lincoln City – the last by one vote.

=== Merger into the Football League ===
In 1892 it was decided to merge the two leagues, and so the Football League Second Division was formed, consisting mostly of Football Alliance clubs; the only Alliance club not to apply to join the League was the insolvent Birmingham St George's. The existing League clubs, plus three of the strongest Alliance clubs, comprised the Football League First Division. Birmingham St George's place in the new Second Division was taken by Sheffield United.

== Member clubs ==
Club	Admitted	Resigned
Ardwick	1891	1892^{2}
Birmingham St George's	1889	1892
Bootle	1889	1892^{2}
Burton Swifts	1891	1892^{2}
Crewe Alexandra	1889	1892^{2}
Darwen	1889	1891^{1}
Grimsby Town	1889	1892^{2}
Lincoln City	1891	1892^{2}
Long Eaton Rangers	1889	1890
Newton Heath	1889	1892^{1}
Nottingham Forest	1889	1892^{1}
Small Heath	1889	1892^{2}
Stoke	1890	1891^{1}
Sunderland Albion	1889	1891
The Wednesday	1889	1892^{1}
Walsall Town Swifts	1889	1892^{2}

Notes

^{1} Elected to Football League First Division
^{2} Elected to Football League Second Division

== Football Alliance champions ==
Season	Winners
1889–90	The Wednesday
1890–91	Stoke
1891–92	Nottingham Forest
