= List of Stoke City F.C. managers =

The following is a list of managers of Stoke City Football Club and their major honours from the beginning of the club's official managerial records in 1874 to the present day.

The longest-serving and most successful person to manage Stoke City is Tony Waddington, who won the League Cup in 1972, Stoke's only major trophy. He also guided the club to consecutive FA Cup semi-finals as well as two appearances in the UEFA Cup and a fourth-place finish in the First Division in his 17-year reign as manager. Welsh manager Tony Pulis had two spells in charge of Stoke which saw him guide the club to promotion to the Premier League in 2008 and a first FA Cup Final in 2011.

== History ==
Stoke's first secretary-manager was Thomas Slaney he also played for the club during his time in charge. He left in 1883 to set up the Staffordshire Football Association. Another ex-player, Walter Cox took over however his reign was a short one lasting just a year in that time he took Stoke into their first FA Cup match. Harry Lockett led Stoke into the Football League in 1888 but after two seasons of finishing last Stoke failed to gain re-election and in 1891 Lockett left to work for the Football League. Joseph Bradshaw took over from Lockett once Stoke had returned to the Football League. Stoke struggled again in the League and Bradshaw was replaced by Arthur Reeves midway through the season. Reeves brought in a number of new players which had a good impact on the club but Stoke's fortunes wavered and he was replaced by ex-goalkeeper Bill Rowley.

After two years in charge, Rowley shocked the Stoke board by transferring himself to Leicester Fosse; he was banned by the FA. Horace Austerberry then embarked on an eleven-year-long spell in which time he took Stoke to their first FA Cup Semi-final in 1899. Stoke were relegated to the Second Division in 1907 and a year later the club went bankrupt and left the Football League. Austerberry left and Alfred Barker had the task of saving the club and he took the club into the Birmingham & District League and Southern Football League. After failing to re enter the Football League, he resigned in 1914. Scotsman Peter Hodge came in from Raith and won the Southern League Division Two; he returned to Scotland following the outbreak of war.

Former star player Joe Schofield took over for the War time leagues from 1914 till 1919. Following the return to League football, the board appointed Arthur Shallcross, who won promotion with the club in 1922; however Stoke were relegated the next season and he resigned in March 1923. Jock Rutherford, former England winger, took over but lasted just eleven games before he quit after a heated row with the board. Tom Mather came in and triggered a run of stability as Stoke only had four managers for the next 54 years (1923–1977). Mather spent twelve years; in that time he won two league titles, the Second Division in 1933 and Third Division North in 1927.

One of Mather's key signings Bob McGrory took over having already spent 14 years at the club making over 500 appearances. During his time in charge, McGrory almost won the First Division title on two occasions in the 1935–36 and 1946–47 seasons. After 31 years with the club, he stood down in 1952. Frank Taylor a fitness fanatic, impressed the board and was appointed in time for the 1952–53 season. However Stoke were relegated in his first season in charge and after seven seasons in the Second Division Taylor was sacked. Taylor was shocked by the chairman's decision and he quit football.

In 1960 Tony Waddington came in and made an inspired decision to bring Stanley Matthews back to the club. Attendance levels increased and in 1963 Stoke won the Second Division. Waddington's success grew with the club as in 1964 they reached the Final of the League Cup, losing over two legs to Leicester City then in 1972 he won the club's first major silverware beating Chelsea 2–1 also in the League Cup. He was also successful in the FA Cup, reaching the Semi-final stage consecutively in 1971 and 1972 losing out to Arsenal on both occasions. However, in 1976 the roof fell off the Victoria Ground and many of Waddington's star players were sold to help pay the repair bill and with Stoke destined for relegation he parted company in March 1977.

Waddington's assistant and fan favourite George Eastham tried in vain to keep the club up and then struggled in the Second Division, leaving in January 1978. Alan A'Court took caretaker role before upcoming Welsh manager Alan Durban came from Shrewsbury Town. He guided Stoke to final day promotion at Notts County in 1979; however, he left in May 1981 to join Sunderland and his assistant at Shrewsbury Richie Barker quickly replaced him. Barker started well with the team playing neat passing football however a change of tactics to a long ball style led to a decline in attendances and results and he was sacked in December 1983.

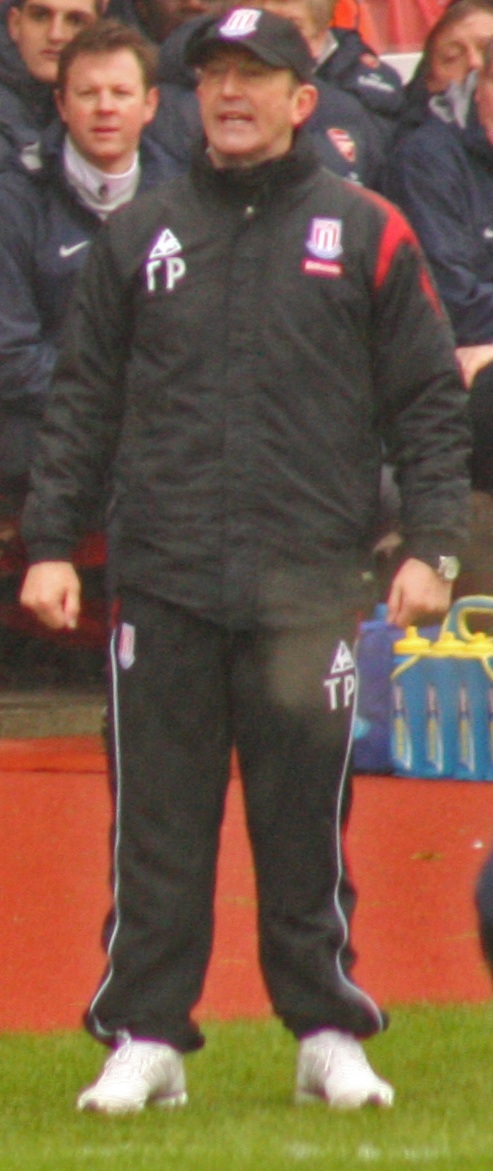
Tony Pulis took Stoke City to their first FA Cup Final in 2011.

Another former player, Bill Asprey, returned to manage the club and saved the club from relegation in 1984. However, the following 1984–85 season saw Stoke record their lowest points total of just 17. With Stoke playing so poorly, Asprey suffered health problems and unsurprisingly left. Tony Lacey saw out the remaining eight matches and lost them all. Mick Mills was installed as player-manager as Stoke looked to rebuild in the Second Division. After four seasons of being unable to mount a promotion challenge, Mills quit in November 1989. World Cup winner Alan Ball took over in what turned out to be a bad appointment as he failed to keep Stoke in the second tier, meaning Stoke were in the third tier for only the second time. Stoke were expected to easily win the Third Division; however results against much smaller clubs were poor and after a 4–0 defeat by Wigan Athletic Ball resigned. His assistant Graham Paddon took over for the rest of the season as Stoke finished in their lowest position.

Lou Macari became Stoke's next manager in what was becoming a 'managerial roundabout'. He had instant success with Stoke taking the club into the play-offs losing out to Stockport County however they beat the same opposition in the final of the Football League Trophy. The next season saw Stoke reach their potential as they won the league and went on a long unbeaten run. In November 1993 the popular Macari left to join Celtic and Joe Jordan replaced him. Jordan was unpopular with the fans due to his lack of passion and negative tactics and he resigned in September 1994. Asa Hartford took caretaker role before Macari made a dramatic return to the club. He inspired the club to the First Division play-offs in 1996 losing to Leicester City. He was in charge of the final season at the Victoria Ground before deciding to end his time at the club.

Chic Bates Macari's assistant was in charge for the club's first season at the Britannia Stadium in what turned out to be an awful season as Stoke were relegated to the third tier. Chris Kamara and Alan Durban both returned to try save the club but were unable to. Former Villa manager Brian Little had the task to gain instant promotion and started well and at one stage were top of the table by eight points; however Stoke's form took a huge slide and they ended up in 8th place and Little left.

Gary Megson became the next manager at the start of the 1999–2000 season; however, after just four months in charge, the club was taken over by an Icelandic consortium and installed Gudjon Thordarson as manager. Thordarson spent three seasons at Stoke winning the Football League Trophy and taking the club into the play-offs three times. Having lost to Gillingham and Walsall Stoke beat Brentford in 2002 to gain promotion back to Division One. Just days after winning promotion however Thordarson was sacked by the board. Steve Cotterill was named as the new manager soon after but after just thirteen matches he quit to join Sunderland as assistant manager. Dave Kevan was caretaker until Tony Pulis became manager in November 2002. Stoke were involved in a relegation battle on the final match of the season. Stoke beat Reading and survived in the First Division. Pulis consolidated Stoke's position in the 2003–04 season however after a very dull 2004–05 season Pulis was sacked for not exploiting the foreign market. Unknown Dutch manager Johan Boskamp was appointed by the board and he promised to play an attractive style of football. However results failed to show any significant improvement, and Boskamp left at the end of the season after falling out with several club officials and key players.

Peter Coates returned as chairman and re-appointed Pulis as manager. In his first season back Stoke narrowly missed out on a play-off spot finishing 7th. In the 2007–08 season Stoke finally ended their 23-year absence from the top light finishing second to gain promotion to the Premier League. With Stoke expected to be involved in a relegation battle they surprised most and finished in a safe position of 12th in 2008–09 and finished in 11th in 2009–10 season. In the 2010–11 season Pulis became the first manager to take Stoke into a FA Cup Final where they lost 1–0 to Manchester City. By reaching the final, Stoke qualified for the 2011–12 UEFA Europa League, after Manchester City confirmed a place in the Champions League. Despite the defeat chairman Peter Coates believes that Pulis is Stoke's greatest ever manager. After a poor 2012–13 season which saw Stoke fail to make progress, Pulis left the club by mutual consent. He was replaced by another Welsh manager, Mark Hughes. Hughes guided the team to three consecutive ninth-place finishes in 2013–14 season, 2014–15 season and 2015–16 season. However, after several big money transfers failed to improve the squad Stoke regressed and Hughes was eventually sacked in January 2018 with the team in the relegation zone. Paul Lambert came in but failed to keep Stoke in the Premier League. Lambert was sacked and replaced by Derby County manager Gary Rowett.

In January 2019, with Stoke struggling to make an impact in the Championship, Rowett was sacked replaced by Luton Town's Nathan Jones. Jones turned out to be a poor choice, winning only six of his 38 games in charge and he was replaced by Michael O'Neill in November 2019. O'Neill kept Stoke up in 2019–20 and guided Stoke through the 2020–21 and 2021–22 seasons finishing 14th twice before he was dismissed in August 2022. On 28 August 2022 Alex Neil was appointed manager on a three-year contract. Neil was sacked in December 2023 with the team in relegation trouble at the bottom of the Championship. Stoke again went for a manager in a job with Steven Schumacher joining from Plymouth Argyle. He guided Stoke to safety, finishing six points above the relegation zone in 2023–24. After five games of the 2024–25 season Schumacher was surprisingly sacked and replaced by inexperienced Spanish coach Narcís Pèlach. Pèlach only managed to win three matches out of 19 and was sacked on 27 December 2024. Mark Robins was appointed on 1 January 2025 on a three-and-a-half year contract.

== Statistics ==
Information correct as of match played 21 November 2026. Only competitive matches are counted.

Name	Nationality	From	To	P	W	D	L	Win%	Honours	Notes
Thomas Slaney	England	1874	1883	0	0	0	0	—		
Walter Cox	England	1883	1884	1	0	0	1	0.00		
Harry Lockett	England	1884	1890	55	13	9	33	23.64		
Joseph Bradshaw	England	1890	1892	33	9	5	19	27.27	1 Football Alliance champion	
Arthur Reeves	England	1892	1895	96	37	14	45	38.54		
Bill Rowley	England	1895	1897	66	29	4	33	43.94		
Horace Austerberry	England	1897	1908	421	149	89	183	35.39		
Alfred Barker	England	1908	1914	256	130	35	91	50.78	1 Birmingham & District League champion 1 Southern League Division Two champion 1 Southern League Division Two runner-up	
Peter Hodge	Scotland	1914	1915	30	21	4	5	70.00	1 Southern League Division Two champion	
Joe Schofield	England	1915	1919	0	0	0	0	—		
Arthur Shallcross	England	1919	1923	171	59	43	69	34.50	1 Second Division runner-up	
Jock Rutherford	England	1923	1923	11	2	3	6	18.18		
Tom Mather	England	1923	1935	523	222	122	179	42.45	1 Second Division champion 1 Third Division North champion	
Bob McGrory	Scotland	1935	1952	460	170	114	176	36.96		
Frank Taylor	England	1952	1960	362	146	79	137	40.33		
Tony Waddington	England	1960	1977	764	265	216	283	34.69	1 League Cup winner 1 League Cup runner-up 1 Watney Cup winner 1 Second Division champion	
George Eastham	England	1977	1978	37	9	12	16	24.32		
Alan A'Court (caretaker)	England	1978	1978	1	0	0	1	0.00		
Alan Durban	Wales	1978	1981	143	53	48	42	37.06	1 Second Division promotion	
Richie Barker	England	1981	1983	102	31	23	48	30.39		
Bill Asprey	England	1983	1985	64	14	15	35	21.88		
Tony Lacey (caretaker)	England	1985	1985	8	0	0	8	0.00		
Mick Mills	England	1985	1989	213	72	63	78	33.80		
Alan Ball	England	1989	1991	62	17	21	24	27.42		
Graham Paddon (caretaker)	England	1991	1991	18	6	3	9	33.33		
Lou Macari	Scotland	1991	1993	138	69	38	31	50.00	1 Football League Trophy winner 1 Second Division champion	
Joe Jordan	Scotland	1993	1994	40	13	13	14	32.50		
Asa Hartford (caretaker)	Scotland	1994	1994	4	3	0	1	75.00		
Lou Macari	Scotland	1994	1997	151	55	47	49	36.42		
Chic Bates	England	1997	1998	33	11	9	13	33.33		
Chris Kamara	England	1998	1998	14	1	5	8	7.14		
Alan Durban (caretaker)	Wales	1998	1998	5	2	0	3	40.00		
Brian Little	England	1998	1999	52	23	7	22	44.23		
Gary Megson	England	1999	1999	22	9	7	6	40.91		
Guðjón Þórðarson	Iceland	1999	2002	154	77	39	38	50.00	1 Football League Trophy winner 1 Second Division play-offs winner	
Steve Cotterill	England	2002	2002	13	3	5	5	23.08		
Dave Kevan (caretaker)	Scotland	2002	2002	4	0	0	4	0.00		
Tony Pulis	Wales	2002	2005	131	47	32	52	35.88		
Johan Boskamp	Netherlands	2005	2006	51	18	10	23	35.29		
Tony Pulis	Wales	2006	2013	333	122	98	113	36.64	1 Championship runner-up 1 FA Cup runner-up	
Mark Hughes	Wales	2013	2018	200	71	48	81	35.50		
Eddie Niedzwiecki (caretaker)	Wales	2018	2018	1	0	0	1	0.00		
Paul Lambert	Scotland	2018	2018	15	2	7	6	13.33		
Gary Rowett	England	2018	2019	29	9	12	8	31.03		
Nathan Jones	Wales	2019	2019	38	6	15	17	15.79		
Rory Delap (caretaker)	Ireland	2019	2019	1	0	0	1	0.00		
Michael O'Neill	Northern Ireland	2019	2022	143	55	35	53	38.46		
Dean Holden (caretaker)	England	2022	2022	1	1	0	0	100.00		
Alex Neil	Scotland	2022	2023	67	22	15	30	32.84		
Paul Gallagher (caretaker)	Scotland	2023	2023	2	0	2	0	0.00		
Steven Schumacher	England	2023	2024	32	13	6	13	40.63		
Alex Morris & Ryan Shawcross (caretakers)	England	2024	2024	1	0	1	0	0.00		
Narcís Pèlach	Spain	2024	2024	19	3	7	9	15.79		
Ryan Shawcross (caretaker)	England	2024	2025	2	1	1	0	50.00		
Mark Robins	England	2025	Present	92	35	22	35	38.04		
