= History of Stoke City F.C. =

History of an English football club

Stoke City Football Club has its origins in Stoke Ramblers, a team formed by former pupils of the Charterhouse School whilst they were apprentices at the North Staffordshire Railway. The club dropped the Ramblers from their name, becoming Stoke Football Club. In 1925, the club's name was changed for the final time to Stoke City Football Club when Stoke-on-Trent was granted city status. The club moved in 1997 to the Britannia Stadium, a 28,383 all-seater stadium; having spent 119 years at the Victoria Ground.

Stoke were one of the twelve founding members of the Football League in 1888. They failed re-election in 1890, but were re-admitted after winning the 1890–91 Football Alliance title. The team were relegated from the First Division in 1907 and entered liquidation the following year. Though the club was saved, Stoke were not re-elected until 1915, and instead spent the intervening years in the Birmingham & District League and Southern League. Promoted from the Second Division in 1921–22, they were relegated twice in four years by 1926. Stoke won the Third Division North in 1926–27 and then the Second Division title in 1932–33. They remained in the top-flight for 20 years, competing for the league title in 1946–47, and then spent a decade in the Second Division, before winning promotion as champions in 1962–63.

Under the stewardship of Tony Waddington, Stoke won the League Cup in 1972 with a 2–1 victory over Chelsea, to date their only major honour. Stoke had also been beaten finalists in 1964. The club spent 14 years in the top-flight, and would secure promotion in 1978–79 after being relegated two years earlier. Stoke remained in the top-flight from 1979 to 1985, though were relegated to the Third Division in 1990. Having won the Football League Trophy in 1992, they were promoted as champions in 1992–93. Relegation in 1998 allowed the club to win another Football League Trophy title in 2000, before promotion was secured with victory in the 2002 play-off final. Manager Tony Pulis took Stoke into the Premier League at the end of the 2007–08 campaign. They played in the final of the FA Cup in 2011, finishing runners-up to Manchester City, which saw the club qualify for European football. Ten years of Premier League football culminated in relegation to the EFL Championship in 2018.

Graph showing Stoke City F.C.'s progress through the English football league system 1889 to the present

== 1863–1888: early years ==
It is claimed that Stoke Ramblers was formed in 1863 when former pupils of Charterhouse School formed a football club while they were apprentices at the North Staffordshire Railway works in Stoke-on-Trent. However, Stoke Ramblers' first documented match was five years later, on 17 October 1868, at the club's original home, the Victoria Cricket Club ground against E.W May's XV, the 15-a-side match ended in a 1–1 draw. In the game, the club's first goal was scored by Henry Almond, Stoke's founder and captain. Stoke played four further fixtures in 1868, recording their first victory with a 2–0 win against Newcastle-under-Lyme. In 1875, to cope with rising attendances, the club switched to a ground at Sweetings Field, not far from the Victoria Cricket Ground. At this time, the only fixtures were friendly matches; this changed in 1877 when the Staffordshire Football Association was formed and created a new competition, the County Cup, which Stoke won in the inaugural season, beating Talke Rangers 1–0 in the final. In an earlier round, Stoke had recorded what is still the club's record victory, a 26–0 triumph over Mow Cop. Stoke retained the County Cup in the following season with a 2–1 win over Cobridge and established themselves as the largest club in the area.

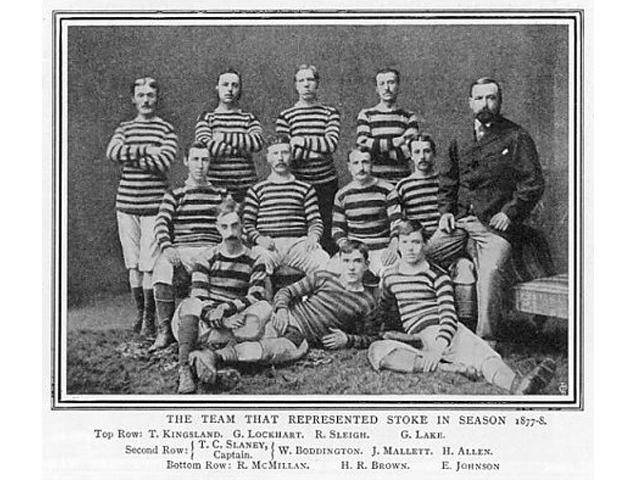
The Stoke squad of 1877–78

In 1878, the club merged with Stoke Victoria Athletic Club and became known as Stoke Football Club. They moved from Sweetings Field to the Athletic Club ground, which soon became known as the Victoria Ground. It was around this time that the club adopted their red and white striped kit. Stoke entered the newly formed Birmingham Association Cup in 1879, being drawn against Hill Top, West Bromwich in the first round. They did not compete the following year but, in 1881, they were beaten 8–0 by Aston Villa in the first round. In the 1882–1883 season, Stoke reached the final of the Staffordshire Senior Cup but were beaten 3–2 by West Bromwich Albion. The club decided to enter the FA Cup for the first time in the 1883–84 season; the competition itself had been founded 12 years earlier. The threat of a rival football association, the British FA, forced the Football Association to legalise professionalism in 1885; Stoke subsequently turned professional in August of that year. The club were defeated again in the FA Cup in 1885–86 after a replay defeat to Crewe Alexandra. The club's first victory in the competition came in the 1886–87 season with a 10–0 win over Caernarfon Wanderers at the Victoria Ground.

== 1888–1900: founder members of the Football League ==
Stoke became one of the twelve founding members of the Football League in 1888. Stoke's manager, Harry Lockett, represented the club at a meeting in London, where the league's formation was discussed. Lockett played an instrumental role in its inception and became the league's first secretary; however he resigned from his role of manager in August 1890, in order to concentrate on his league responsibilities. Stoke struggled in their first two seasons in the league, 1888–89 and 1889–90, finishing in last place on both occasions. The club failed to secure re-election to the league at the end of its second season, instead being replaced by Sunderland. As a consequence, Stoke started 1890–91 in the Football Alliance; they finished the season as champions. The Football League was expanded to include fourteen clubs in 1891–92, which ensured Stoke were re-elected to the league, where they remained for the rest of the decade. In 1897, Stoke appointed Horace Austerberry, who in 1898–99 became the first manager to lead the club to the semi-final of the FA Cup.

== 1900–1919: financial problems and rebirth ==
Stoke suffered financial problems around 1900, which ultimately led to the loss of the club's Football League status in 1908. "Historical Football Kits" says that, "In 1908, having finished in mid-table, Stoke went into liquidation and resigned from the League. Ironically this galvanised local businessmen, the clergy (the Victoria Ground was owned by the Church of England) and supporters to form a new limited company and purchase the old club's assets." The club moved to the Birmingham & District League after its demotion. In 1909, the club opted to field teams in two league competitions, one in the Birmingham & District League and the other in the Southern League; Stoke won the latter in their first year in the competition. Stoke continued to participate in both leagues until 1915, when their application for election back into the Football League was approved. However, the outbreak of the First World War meant the league was suspended for four years; it recommenced in August 1919. During this time, Stoke entered the Lancashire Primary and Secondary leagues.

== 1919–1930: yo-yo years ==
The club became owners of the Victoria Ground in 1919. The Butler Street stand was constructed shortly afterward, increasing the overall capacity of the ground to 50,000. Following the restart of the Football League, Stoke achieved promotion from the Second Division in the 1921–22 season under the stewardship of Arthur Shallcross, although this was followed by relegation in the 1922–23 season. Unable to prevent the club's bad form, Shallcross resigned in March 1923. Tom Mather was appointed manager later in 1923, although Stoke were unable to mount another promotion challenge. They were instead relegated from the Second Division four years later in the 1925–26 season. The club's stay in Third Division North was brief, as Stoke won the championship during their first season in that league. In 1925, Stoke-on-Trent was granted city status, and this led the club to change its name to Stoke City Football Club.

== 1930–1938: emergence of The Wizard of Dribble ==
The 1930s saw the début of the club's most celebrated player, Stanley Matthews. Matthews, who grew up in Hanley, was an apprentice at the club and made his first appearance, aged 17, in March 1932 against Bury. By end of the decade, Matthews had established himself as an England international and one of the best footballers of his generation. Matthews won his first England cap in 1934, making him the first Stoke player in 30 years to play for England. Stoke achieved promotion from the Second Division in the 1932–33 season as champions, but Matthews only featured in 15 games, although he did score his first goal for the club in a 3–1 win against local rivals Port Vale.

By 1934, the club's average attendance had risen to over 23,000, which allowed the club manager, Tom Mather, more transfer funds. Despite this, the core of the side consisted of young local players, such as Matthews, Tommy Sale and Freddie Steele. Mathers resigned from his post in May 1935 to take the managerial job at Newcastle United, ending his 12-year tenure. Bob McGrory was appointed as the club's manager shortly afterward; he had previously played for the club for 14 years. In the 1935–36 season, the club finished fourth in the Football League First Division, nine points adrift of champions Sunderland. This was followed by two successive mid-table finishes, in 1936–37 and 1937–38. The club recorded its record league win, 10–3, over West Bromwich Albion in February 1937, in which Steele scored five goals. In April of that year, the club achieved its largest league crowd—51,373 against Arsenal. Steele's 33 league goals in the 1936–37 season remains a club record.

== 1938–1950: World War II and title challenge ==
By 1938, rumours purported that Stanley Matthews wanted to leave Stoke to further his career. This led to a meeting at Kings Hall, attended by three thousand people with a further thousand outside. Matthews opted to stay with Stoke and helped the club to finish in seventh place in the 1938–39 season. The outbreak of the Second World War prevented further progress as the league was suspended for six years. After resumption of the FA Cup, 33 fans died and 520 were injured during a sixth round away game against Bolton Wanderers when the crush barriers gave way on the terraces.

At this time, the side was predominantly composed of local players who had come through the club's youth system, including Matthews, Sale, Steele and John McCue, all in their prime, as well as the newly discovered Neil Franklin, regarded as the country's best centre-half. In the 1946–47 season, Stoke mounted a serious title challenge: the club needed a win in their final game of the season to win the First Division title, but a 2–1 defeat to Sheffield United gave the title to Liverpool. Stanley Matthews left the club three games before the end of the 1946–47 season to join Blackpool at the age of 32 for a fee of £11,500. The team subsequently failed to mount a title challenge in the following two seasons, 1947–48 and 1948–49, finishing 15th and 11th respectively.

== 1950–1960: relegation and Second Division frustrations ==
The 1950s did not start well for the club; having avoided relegation in the 1950–51 and 1951–52 seasons, Stoke succumbed in 1952–53, finishing second from bottom. Bob McGrory resigned as the club's manager in February 1952 after 17 years in the role. His successor, Frank Taylor, consolidated the club's position in the Second Division but was unable to mount a sustained challenge for promotion, although Stoke came close in the 1954–55 season, missing by two points. Taylor's failure to deliver promotion led to his dismissal in June 1960, after a 17th-place finish in the 1959–60 season.

== 1960–1977: the Waddington years ==
By 1960 Stoke were struggling to attract supporters to the Victoria Ground, with the average attendance dropping below 10,000 for the first time in 40 years. Tony Waddington was appointed as the club's manager in June 1960. He joined the club in 1952 as a coach, before being promoted to assistant manager in 1957. In his first season in charge, 1960–61, Stoke finished 18th in the Second Division. Crowds were still low; a match against Preston North End attracted 8,409 in 1961. However, Waddington pulled off a significant coup by enticing Stanley Matthews—now 46 years old—back to the club, 14 years after he had left. A crowd of 35,974 witnessed Matthews' return to the club, only a fortnight after the poor crowd against Preston. The return of Matthews helped Stoke to rise to eighth position in 1961–62. Promotion was achieved in the next season, when Stoke finished as champions. In their first season back in the First Division, 1963–64, Waddington guided Stoke to a mid-table finish. Matthews remained influential, as he helped the club to the Football League Cup final in 1964, although this ended in a 4–3 defeat to Leicester over two legs.

Waddington relied upon experience; Dennis Viollet, Jackie Mudie, Roy Vernon, Maurice Setters and Jimmy McIlroy were players signed in the later stages of their careers. Matthews was awarded a knighthood for services to football in the 1965 New Year's Honours list. This was followed by his final, league appearance for the club against Fulham in February 1965, shortly after his 50th birthday. It ended a career spanning 33 years, including 19 years' service to his home town club. Gordon Banks, England's 1966 World Cup winning goalkeeper, joined Stoke from Leicester in 1967 for £52,000. Regarded as the best goalkeeper in the world, Banks proved to be a shrewd signing for Waddington as he helped the club maintain stability in the First Division. However, Banks was forced to quit top-level football in 1972, after losing an eye in a road accident.

The club won its first significant trophy on 4 March 1972, in the League Cup Final. Stoke beat favourites Chelsea 2–1 in the final at Wembley Stadium before a crowd of 97,852 spectators. Before this victory, Stoke had progressed through 11 games to reach the final. This included four games with West Ham United in the semi-final; the two-legged match was played twice. Stoke fared well in the FA Cup; the club progressed to the semi-final stage in both the 1970–71 and 1971–72 seasons. However, on both occasions Stoke lost to Arsenal in a replay.

Waddington was presented with a dilemma as both George Eastham and Peter Dobing retired not long after the club's League Cup win. Waddington responded by paying £240,000 to Chelsea for the services of Alan Hudson in early 1974. This was followed by Geoff Salmons' arrival from Sheffield United for £160,000, in the same year. Waddington later paid a world record fee for a goalkeeper, £325,000, to sign Peter Shilton from Leicester City. The new personnel brought added impetus to Waddington's side, and Stoke were close to winning the League title in 1974–75, but an end of season slump led to a fifth-place finish, four points off the champions, Derby.

The 1970s also saw Stoke compete at European Level for the first time in its history. Stoke qualified for the UEFA Cup in 1972–73 as a result of their League Cup triumph. In the first round, Stoke played Kaiserslautern of Germany: Stoke won the first leg 3–1 at the Victoria Ground, with a crowd of over 22,000. However, the club lost the second leg 4–0, therefore losing 5–3 on aggregate. Stoke qualified for the UEFA Cup two years later, due to their fifth-place finish in the First Division in the 1973–74 season. In the 1974–75 competition, Stoke were again knocked out at the first stage. Stoke drew both legs against Dutch side Ajax, 1–1 and 0–0 respectively, but went out due to the away goals rule.

The Butler Stand roof was blown off in a storm in January 1976. The ground damage meant the club's next home game against Middlesbrough had to be played at Vale Park, the home of local rivals Port Vale. The repair bill, in the region of £250,000, put the club in financial trouble, which was eased by the sale of Alan Hudson, Mike Pejic and Jimmy Greenhoff for a combined sum of £440,000. With the team depleted, relegation proved inevitable in the 1976–77 season. Waddington, after a spell of 17 years in charge, left the club after a 1–0 home defeat in March 1977.

== 1977–1990: from First Division to Third ==
George Eastham, who had previously been Waddington's assistant, was appointed as manager in March 1977, but the club's slide into the Second Division in 1976–77 season proved unstoppable. Eastham did not last long, leaving in January 1978 after only 10 months in charge. The club's misery was compounded by a defeat to non-league Blyth Spartans in the FA Cup shortly afterwards. Alan Durban, arriving from Shrewsbury Town, was selected as the club's new manager in February 1978. Durban achieved promotion to the First Division in his first full season, 1978–79, with a third-place finish. After consolidating the club's position in the First Division, Durban left for Sunderland in 1981.

Richie Barker, Durban's successor, was appointed manager in 1981. He signed Mickey Thomas from Brighton and Hove Albion and Mark Chamberlain from Port Vale, as he set about building a side for the 1982–83 season. Thomas was signed for £200,000 and made over 60 appearances for the club, but was sold to Chelsea for £75,000 in 1984. Winger Chamberlain, a £135,00 signing, proved successful as he made eight appearances for England during his stay at Stoke. Barker's spell in charge was short-lived; he was sacked in his second season, 1983–84. The club's new manager, Bill Asprey, decided to bring back veteran Alan Hudson, and the decision paid off as Stoke improved during the second half of the 1983–84 season and avoided relegation on the final day.

The 1984–85 season, proved to be disastrous as Stoke finished the season with only 17 points and just three wins, which would be the lowest points total in the top flight of English football (under the "three points for a win" system) for 21 years until the record was broken by Sunderland in the 2005–06 season. Mick Mills was appointed player-manager for the 1985–86 season, following Asprey's departure in April 1985 due to ill health.

His first task was to consolidate following the club's relegation in the previous season, which he achieved with a mid-table finish in the Second Division. The team reached fourth place in 1986–87, his second season in charge, including a 7–2 win over Leeds United, but the team's form tailed off towards the end of the season, culminating in an eighth-place finish. Mills was unable to sustain a challenge for promotion and was sacked in November 1989, following a poor start to the 1989–90 season after spending £1m on players. His successor, Alan Ball, became the club's fifth manager in 10 years. Peter Coates became the club's chairman in 1989, following numerous changes of chairmanship during the 1980s. Ball struggled in his first season in charge, 1989–90, and his Stoke side were relegated to the third tier of English football after finishing bottom of the Second Division.

The start of the 1990–91 season in the Third Division marked the first time Stoke had played at this level in 63 years. Ball kept his job for the start of this campaign but departed in February 1991 in the midst of an indifferent season that saw Stoke finish in their lowest league position of 14th.

== 1990–1997: two spells under Lou Macari ==
Ball's successor, Lou Macari, was appointed in May 1991, prior to the start of the 1991–92 season. The improvement was immediate, as Stoke narrowly missed out on promotion in his first season in charge, finishing fourth in the Third Division. He also clinched a cup for the club; the Football League Trophy was won with a 1–0 victory against Stockport County at Wembley; Mark Stein scored the only goal of the game. The following season, 1992–93, promotion was achieved from the third tier, with Stoke finishing as league champions. Stein, a £100,000 purchase from Oxford United, scored 26 goals during the season as Stoke amassed a total of 93 points. Macari left in October 1993 to take over as manager of Scottish side Celtic, and Stein also departed in a £1.5m move to Chelsea.

Joe Jordan's tenure in charge was short; he left the club less than a year after joining. Following Jordan's departure, Stoke opted to reappoint Lou Macari only 12 months after he had left. Despite the optimism surrounding his return, only a mid-table finish was attained in the 1994–95 season. The 1995–96 season started poorly, but the signing of striker Mike Sheron turned around the club's campaign. Stoke eventually finished fourth but were defeated in the play-off semi-final by Leicester City. The following season, 1996–97, saw Mark Stein return from Chelsea on loan, partnering Sheron in attack. The season started well, with Stoke in fourth place at Christmas, but a poor second half of the season saw the club drop to an eventual 12th place. Sheron was sold in 1997 for a club record fee of £2.5m. Macari left the club at the end of the season, his last game in charge the final league game at the Victoria Ground in a match against West Bromwich Albion.

== 1997–2008: the Britannia Stadium ==
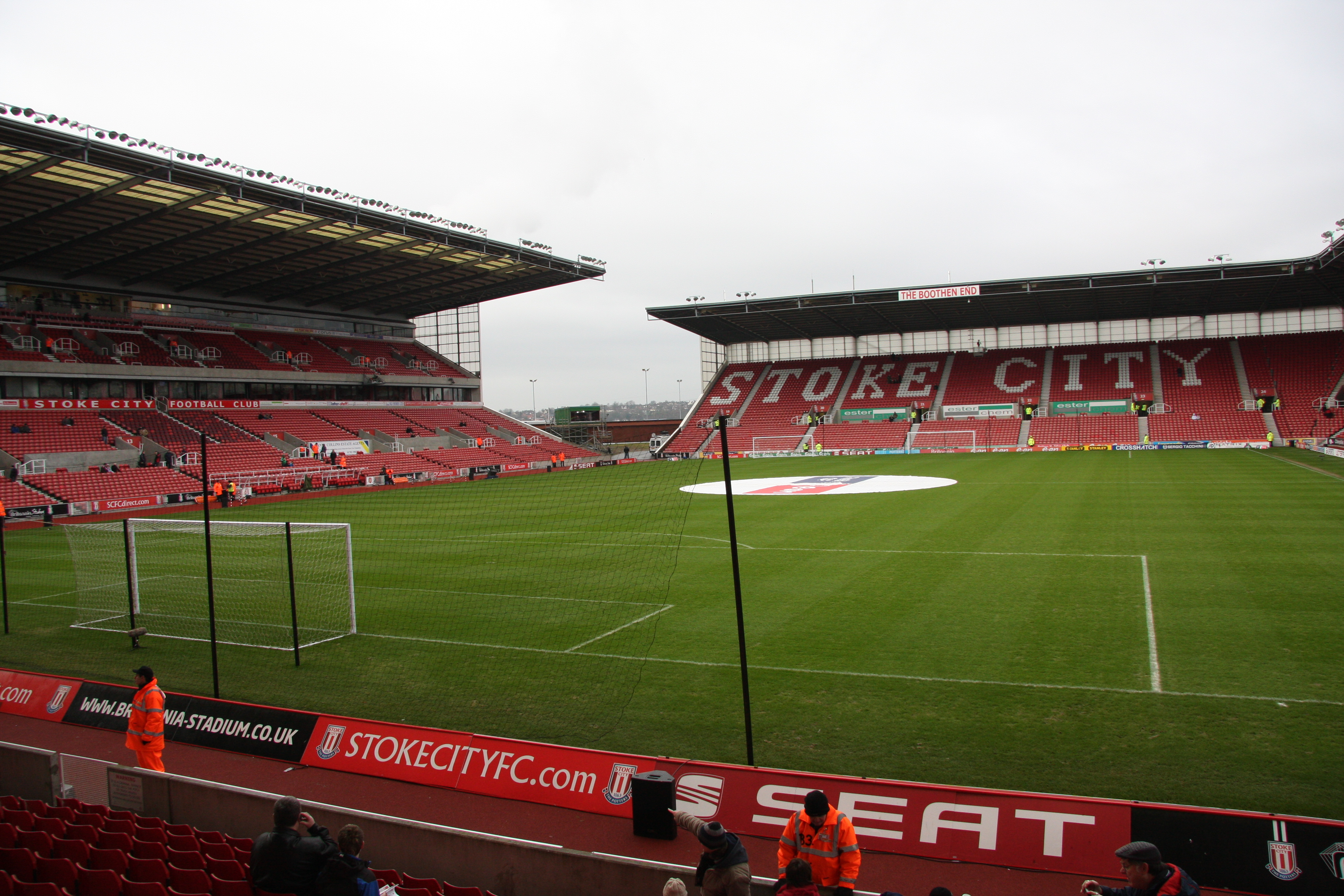
The Britannia Stadium

The 1997–98 season saw Stoke move to its new ground, the 28,000 all-seater Britannia Stadium, after 119 years at the Victoria Ground, the longest time spent at a ground by any team in Britain at that time. Chic Bates, Macari's assistant, was appointed manager for the club's inaugural season in the new ground. Bates struggled as his side slipped from a play-off place towards the relegation zone, with the club's bad run culminating in a 7–0 home defeat to Birmingham City. Bates was replaced by Chris Kamara in January 1998. Kamara could not improve the club's fortunes, and he left in April. Alan Durban, Stoke's manager two decades earlier, took charge for the remainder of season. Durban was unable to keep the club up, with a 23rd-place finish consigning Stoke to relegation from the First Division.

Brian Little, formerly manager of Aston Villa, took charge for the 1998–99 season, and Stoke began the season impressively, holding first place until December with six straight wins. The team's form tailed off in the latter stages of the season, leading to Little's departure at the end of the season. His successor, Gary Megson, was only in the job for four months. Megson was forced to depart following a takeover by Stoke Holding, an Icelandic consortium that purchased a 66 per cent share in Stoke City F.C. for £6.6m. The club's new owners appointed the club's first foreign manager, Icelander Gudjon Thordarson, in November 1999.

Stoke won the Football League Trophy in the 1999–2000 season with a 2–1 win over Bristol City in April 2000 before a crowd of 75,057 at Wembley. Disappointment followed a month later, as Stoke were defeated against Gillingham in the play-off semi-finals, consigning themselves to another year in the third tier. They reached the play-offs again in the 2000–01 season with a fifth-place finish, but this time Walsall halted Stoke's progress at the semi-final stage. Thordarson achieved promotion at the third attempt in 2001–02; another fifth-place finish ensured a play-off spot. Cardiff City were defeated in the semi-final before a 2–0 win against Brentford at the Millennium Stadium secured promotion. Despite achieving the goal of promotion, Thordarson was sacked by Gunnar Gíslason, only five days after the club won the play-off final. A campaign calling for Thordarson's reinstatement was organised by fans, but it proved unsuccessful.

Steve Cotterill was drafted in as Thordarson's replacement before the start of the 2002–03 season. Cotterill quit in October 2002, after only four months in charge, to take the role of Howard Wilkinson's assistant at Sunderland. The club were close to unveiling George Burley as their new manager after Cotterill's departure; however, a last minute charge of heart led the former Ipswich manager to decline the club's offer. The club acted swiftly and Tony Pulis was appointed as Stoke's new manager shortly afterwards. Pulis steered Stoke clear of relegation with a 1–0 win over Reading on the final day of the season that kept the club in the First Division. The club's position in the league was consolidated in 2003–04. Pulis was sacked at the end of the 2004–05 season, following a disagreement between himself and the club's owners. Dutch manager Johan Boskamp was named as Pulis' successor on 29 June 2005, only a day after Pulis was sacked. Boskamp broke the club's transfer record in signing Sambegou Bangoura for a fee in the region of £1m. Another significant addition was the signing of Belgium international Carl Hoefkens, who subsequently won the Fans' Player of the Year Award for the 2005–06 season. Despite his spending on new players, Boskamp's side was inconsistent and only a mid-table finish was achieved. The season was marred by a feud between Boskamp and the club's director of football, John Rudge, which escalated to the point where Boskamp threatened to quit. Boskamp left at the end of the 2005–06 season, amidst a takeover by former chairman Peter Coates.

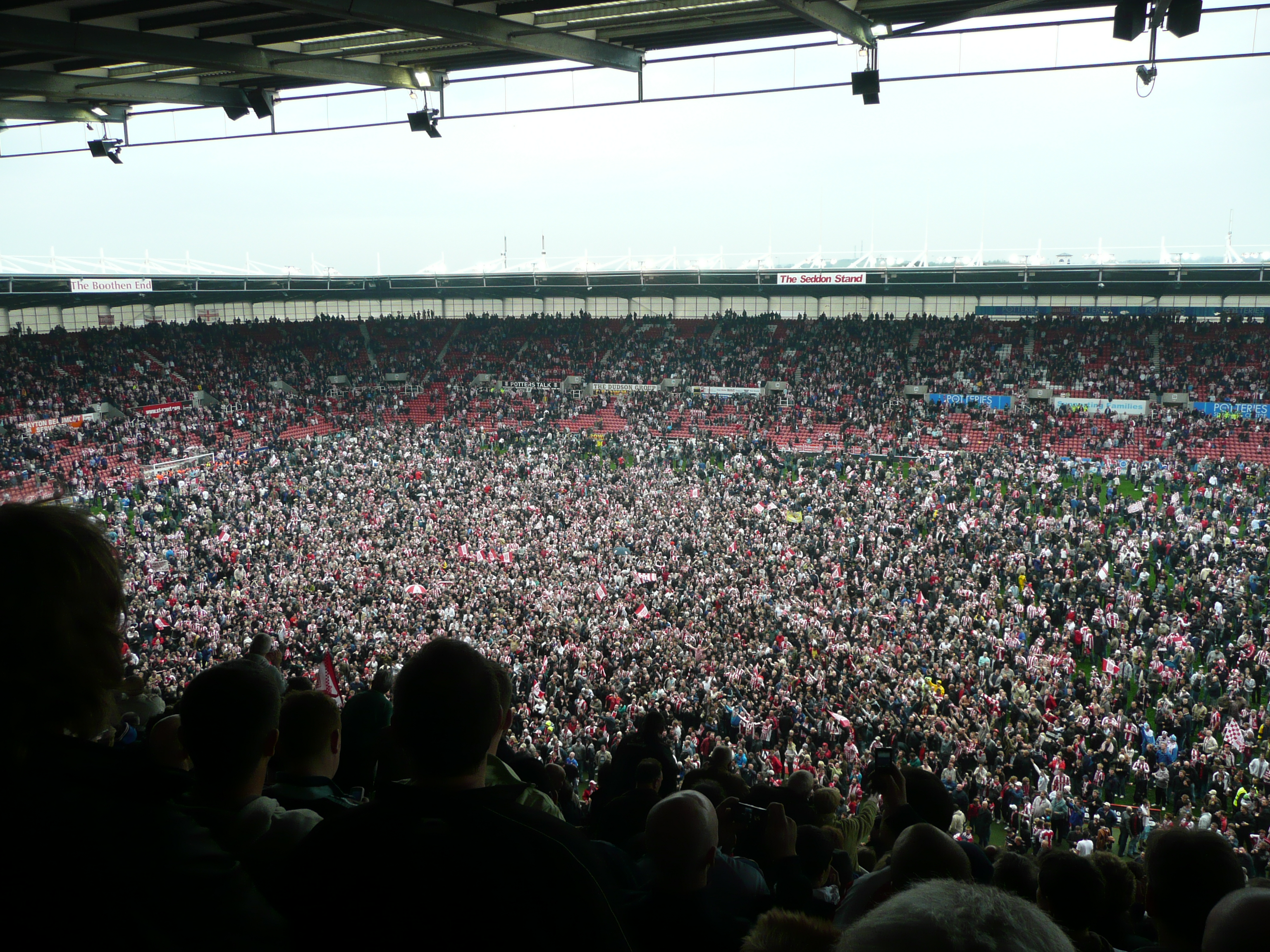
Stoke City fans celebrate following promotion to the Premier League on 4 May 2008.

On 23 May 2006, Coates completed his takeover of Stoke City, marking the end of Gunnar Gíslason's chairmanship of the club. Coates chose former manager Tony Pulis as Boskamp's successor in June 2006. Pulis took Stoke close to a play-off place, however an eventual eighth-place finish was achieved in the 2006–07 season. In June 2007, chairman Peter Coates purchased the Britannia Stadium outright from the City Council for a fee in the region of £6m.

== 2008–2018: ten years in the Premier League ==
Stoke won automatic promotion to the Premier League on the final day of the 2007–08 season, finishing in second place in the Championship. On 18 July 2008, the club broke their transfer record to purchase striker Dave Kitson for £5.5 million from Reading. A 3–1 defeat to Bolton Wanderers on the opening day of the 2008–09 season saw Stoke written off by many media outlets as relegation certainties. The following weekend, the Britannia Stadium hosted its first ever top-flight game, against Aston Villa, with a home win courtesy of Mamady Sidibe's injury-time goal from a Rory Delap throw-in, giving Stoke City their first ever Premier League points. The club went on to record a 12th-place finish in their first season back in the Premier League. A much cited aspect of the team's style of play has been the utilisation of Delap's long throw to create goal-scoring opportunities. Pulis signed Robert Huth and Tuncay Şanlı from Middlesbrough for a combined fee in the region of £10 million, in a bid to establish the club in the Premier League prior to the 2009–10 season. This feat was achieved comfortably as the club finished in 11th place, thereby securing a third season in the Premier League. Pulis bolstered his squad for 2010–11 season with the club record £8 million signing of Kenwyne Jones.

For the second season running Stoke made it to the quarter-final of the FA Cup after overcoming Cardiff City, Wolverhampton Wanderers and Brighton & Hove Albion. They met West Ham United in the quarters and won 2–1 thus earning a place in the FA Cup Semi-final for only the fourth time in their history. It was also their first trip to the New Wembley Stadium when they took on Bolton Wanderers for a place in the final. Stoke comfortably beat Bolton 5–0 clinching a first FA Cup Final appearance in their 148-year history. However, they lost the final 1–0 to Manchester City. By reaching the final, Stoke qualified for the 2011–12 UEFA Europa League. Despite a strong season, with an 8th-place finish in sight, defeat at home to Wigan Athletic in the final game meant that Stoke finished 13th in the 2010–11 season.

On 28 July 2011, Stoke beat Hadjuk Split 2–0 over two legs in the third qualifying round of the Europa League. It was Stoke's first appearance in Europe in 37 years. Stoke would go on progress past FC Thun in the Play-off round gaining entrance into the group stage where Stoke were handed a tough draw against Besiktas, Dynamo Kyiv and Maccabi Tel Aviv. Stoke finished second in the group and were handed a glamour tie against Spanish giants Valencia in the round of 32, following the draw manager Pulis stated that he is relishing the prospect of taking on one of Europe's top clubs. Stoke lost both legs 1–0 to end their European campaign. Pulis received criticism from some supporters after he fielded a weakened team in the second leg. Stoke ended the 2011–12 season in 14th position in what was perceived to be a disappointing season. The 2012–13 season saw Stoke make little progress, finishing in 13th position. Pulis subsequently left the club by mutual consent on 21 May 2013.

He was replaced by another Welsh manager, Mark Hughes. Hughes led Stoke to a ninth-place finish in 2013–14, their highest position in the Premier League and best finish since 1974–75. Stoke again finished in ninth position in 2014–15, which ended with a 6–1 victory against Liverpool. Despite breaking their transfer record twice (on Xherdan Shaqiri and then Giannelli Imbula), in 2015–16, Stoke did not make any progression and finished in ninth position for a third season running. Stoke declined in 2016–17, finishing in 13th position. The decline continued in 2017–18 under Mark Hughes and he was sacked in January 2018 with the club in the relegation zone. The board chose Paul Lambert to try and keep Stoke up but he managed just two wins in 15, ending Stoke's ten-year spell in the Premier League.

== 2018–present: return to the Championship ==
The board appointed Derby County manager Gary Rowett for the 2018–19 season with his task to mount a quick return to the Premier League. However despite spending over £30 million on new players, performances were very underwhelming and Rowett lost his job in January 2019. They then decided to appoint a manager from the lower leagues, Luton Town's Welsh manager Nathan Jones. Jones only won three of the remaining matches of the season, drawing eleven of them including four consecutive 0–0 draws as Stoke ended in 16th position.

Jones was allowed to bring in ten new players for the 2019–20 season in order to fit his preferred 'diamond' formation. These changes failed to improve the team and they went on to have their worst start to a league campaign not winning any of their first ten matches. Jones was sacked in November 2019 with the side bottom of the Championship table and he was replaced by Northern Ireland manager Michael O'Neill. Results began to improve under O'Neill and the side began to pull away from danger until the season was suspended in March 2020 due to the COVID-19 pandemic. Stoke won four of the remaining nine matches to avoid relegation and finish in 15th position, finishing eight points clear of the relegation zone. Due to the pandemic the entire 2020–21 season was played without supporters and Stoke finished in 14th position.

In 2021–22 Stoke made a positive start to the season but a poor second half of the campaign saw the team fall out of play-off contention and they again finished in 14th. A slow start to the 2022–23 season marked the end for O'Neill's time in charge and he was dismissed in August 2022, with Sunderland boss Alex Neil replacing him. Neil was unable to turn Stoke's fortunes around and he was replaced by Steven Schumacher in December 2023 with the team in a relegation battle. Schumacher guided the team to safety in 2023–24 but after three defeats in the first five games of 2024–25 he was surprisingly sacked an replaced by Spanish coach Narcís Pèlach. Pèlach only managed to win three matches out of 19 and was sacked on 27 December 2024. Mark Robins was appointed on 1 January 2025 on a three-and-a-half year contract. Stoke avoided relegation on the final day of the 2024–25 season drawing 0–0 with Derby County.

== Books ==
- Lowe, Simon (2007). Match of My Life: Stoke City. Know the Score Books. ISBN 978-1-905449-55-2.
- Matthews, Tony (1997). A-Z of Stoke City. The Breedon Books Publishing Company Limited. ISBN 1-85983-100-1.
- Matthews, Tony (2008). The Legends of Stoke City. Breedon Books Publishing Company Limited. ISBN 978-1-85983-653-8.
- Smith, Denis (2008). Denis Smith: Just One of Seven. Know the Score Books. ISBN 978-1-84818-504-3.
- Thomas, Mickey (2008). Kickups, Hiccups, Lockups: The Autobiography. Century. ISBN 978-1-84605-523-2.
