= Jack Yates (footballer, born 1860) =

English footballer

Personal information
- Full name: John Yates
- Date of birth: 1860
- Place of birth: Stoke-upon-Trent, England
- Position: Forward

Senior career*
| Years | Team | Apps | (Gls) |
- Stone Miners Welfare
| 1883–1884 | Stoke | | |
- Sandbach Rangers
- * Club domestic league appearances and goals

John Yates (born 1860) was an English footballer who played for Stoke.

== Career ==
Yates played for Stone Miners Welfare before joining Stoke in 1883. He played in the club's first competitive match in the FA Cup against Manchester in a 2–1 defeat. He was released at the end of the 1883–84 season by manager Walter Cox. He later played for Sandbach Rangers.

== Career statistics ==
| Club | Season | FA Cup | | Total | |
| Club | Season | Apps | Goals | Apps | Goals |
|---|---|---|---|---|---|
| Stoke | 1883–84 | 1 | 0 | 1 | 0 |
| Career Total | | 1 | 0 | 1 | 0 |
