= M. Mellor =

English footballer

Personal information
- Place of birth: Stoke-upon-Trent, England
- Position: Defender

Senior career*
| Years | Team | Apps | (Gls) |
- Leek
| 1883–1884 | Stoke | | |
- * Club domestic league appearances and goals

M. Mellor was an English footballer who played for Stoke.

== Career ==
Mellor played for Leek before joining Stoke in 1883. He played in the club's first competitive match in the FA Cup which Stoke lost 2–1 to Manchester. He was released at the end of the 1883–84 season by manager Walter Cox.

== Career statistics ==
| Club | Season | FA Cup | | Total | |
| Club | Season | Apps | Goals | Apps | Goals |
|---|---|---|---|---|---|
| Stoke | 1883–84 | 1 | 0 | 1 | 0 |
| Career total | | 1 | 0 | 1 | 0 |
