= Tom Stanford =

English footballer

Personal information
- Full name: Thomas Stanford
- Date of birth: 1860
- Place of birth: Stoke-upon-Trent, England
- Position: Full back

Senior career*
Years	Team	Apps	(Gls)
- Tunstall Park
1883–1884	Stoke		
- Congleton
- * Club domestic league appearances and goals

Thomas Stanford (born 1860) was an English footballer who played for Stoke.

== Career ==
Stanford was born in Stoke-upon-Trent and played for Tunstall Park before joining Stoke in 1883. He played in the club's first competitive match in the FA Cup against Manchester in a 2–1 defeat. At the end of the 1883–84 season he joined Congleton.

== Career statistics ==
Appearances and goals by club, season and competition
Club	Season	FA Cup		Total	
Club	Season	Apps	Goals	Apps	Goals
Stoke	1883–84	1	0	1	0
Career total		1	0	1	0
