= Edward Johnson (footballer, born 1859) =

English footballer

Personal information
- Date of birth: 28 November 1859
- Place of birth: Stoke-upon-Trent, England
- Date of death: 30 June 1901 (aged 41)
- Position: Forward

Senior career*
Years	Team	Apps	(Gls)
1878–1880	Saltley College		
1880–1885	Stoke		

International career
1880–1884	England	2	(2)
- * Club domestic league appearances and goals

Edward Johnson (28 November 1859 – 30 June 1901) was an English footballer who played for Stoke and the England national team. He scored Stoke's first goal in the FA Cup and is also the club's first player to be capped.

== Club career ==
Johnson was born in Stoke-upon-Trent and by the 1870s he was attending St Peter's teacher training where he played for the Saltley College Football Club and participated in a number of sports. He returned to his home town and started playing for Stoke where he played and scored in the club's first competitive match in the FA Cup which was against Manchester in a 2–1 defeat. He retired due to injury without playing in any more competitive fixtures for Stoke and later worked for the Staffordshire Football Association.

== International career ==
Johnson played twice for England firstly against Wales in 1880 and against Ireland in 1884. He scored twice against Ireland in an 8–1 win for England.

== Career statistics ==
=== Club ===
Club	Season	FA Cup		Total	
Club	Season	Apps	Goals	Apps	Goals
Stoke	1883–84	1	1	1	1
Career Total		1	1	1	1

=== International ===
National team	Year	Apps	Goals
England	1880	1	0
England	1884	1	2
Total		2	2
