= 1883–84 Stoke F.C. season =

Stoke
1883–84 season
- Manager: Walter Cox
- Stadium: Victoria Ground
- FA Cup: First Round
Home colours

The 1883–84 season was the first season Stoke took part in a major competitive competition, the FA Cup.

== Season review ==
Since Stoke were founded in 1863 their seasons consisted of friendly matches and the Staffordshire Senior Cup. There was the FA Cup which had been competed for by amateur clubs until the Football Association's resolution that a 'Challenge Cup' be established and open to all clubs belonging to the association which had a tremendous bearing on the game. Stoke first entered the FA Cup in 1883–84 but they were defeated 2–1 by Manchester in the first round. Edward Johnson scoring Stoke's first competitive goal.

== FA Cup ==
Round	Date	Opponent	Venue	Result	Attendance	Scorers
R1	10 November 1883	Manchester	H	1–2	1,000	Johnson

=== Squad statistics ===
Pos.	Name	FA Cup	
Pos.	Name	Apps	Goals
GK	(England) Percy Birch	1	0
FB	(England) M. Mellor	1	0
FB	(England) Tom Stanford	1	0
HB	(England) Walter Cox	1	0
HB	(England) George Shutt	1	0
HB	(England) Elijah Smith	1	0
FW	(England) Teddy Bennett	1	0
FW	(England) Horace Brown	1	0
FW	(England) Edward Johnson	1	1
FW	(England) Ted Wilson	1	0
FW	(England) Jack Yates	1	0

== Before competitive football - 1868 to 1882 ==
Prior to Stoke entering the FA Cup they competed in friendlies and in the Staffordshire Senior Cup.

The club contends that it was formed in 1863 as Stoke Ramblers F.C. when Railway students from the Charterhouse School in Surrey moved to Stoke-upon-Trent to work as apprentices for the North Staffordshire Railway Works. Amongst them was Henry Almond who was a keen sportsman and it is believed that he introduced football to the local workers although there is no record that matches took place. However, in 1868 it was reported in The Field newspaper that Stoke Ramblers had been formed with Almond as its captain and the club was to play under association football rules. It remains unclear as to whether Stoke played any matches from 1863 to 1868.

=== Legend ===
Win	Draw	Loss

=== 1868–69 ===
Stoke's first recorded match was a fifteen-a-side game against E.W May's XV on 17 October 1868. Both sides were made up of local railway employees with Stoke Ramblers being captained by Henry Almond who played a major role in creating the club. The match finished 1–1 with both goals being scored by Almond and May. Stoke's second match was a goalless draw with D. Gordon's XI and then another draw followed against Congleton. Stoke recorded their first victory against Newcastle under-Lyme by the score of 2–0. The local papers stated that the matches were attended by a 'fashionable assembling of spectators'. Their final match of the first season saw them play Leek under Rugby football rules with Stoke winning by a goal and one try to Leek's two tries.

Opponent	Venue	Result
E.W May's XV	H	1–1
D. Gordon's XI	H	0–0
Congleton	H	1–1
Newcastle-under-Lyme	A	2–0
Leek	A	1–0

=== 1869–70 ===
No Matches recorded

=== 1870–71 ===
Stoke Ramblers suffered their first defeat at the hands of Whitchurch in December 1870 going down 1–0. The match is said to have been played under association football rules but with an oval ball. Stoke had beaten Derby School a fortnight earlier.

Opponent	Venue	Result
Derby School	H	1–0
Whitchurch	A	0–1

=== 1871–72 ===
The local press began to cover matches more fully by the 1871–72 season, while some sides were still fielding anything from eleven to fifteen players, there was far less variation in the overall rules. There was a strong local bias in Stoke's fixture list during the first half of the 1871–72 campaign as they achieved victories over Sandbach, Burton-on-Trent, Congleton and Rugeley. Towards the end of the season the team's performance fell away as Burton got their revenge and Stoke lost 3–0 to Derby School when they fielded two players less than Derby.

Opponent	Venue	Result
Sandbach	A	?–?
Burton-on-Trent	H	4–0
Congleton	A	?–?
Rugeley	A	?–?
Burton-on-Trent	A	0–1
Derby School	A	0–3

=== 1872–73 ===
In 1871 Thomas Slaney played his first match for Stoke and he would go on to become club captain and the club's first manager. Stoke played some interesting matches in 1872–73 with Congleton, essentially a rugby team played Stoke with four men short so the Ramblers lent Congleton four reserves, despite putting up a brave fight Stoke won 2–0. The match against Nottingham Forest was played on a frosted surface and so the Forest players added nails to their boots to get a better grip. They caused a number of injuries to the Stoke players and Forest won 3–1. Stoke also played Notts County, Derby Town, Ashbourne, Shropshire Victoria, Burton-on-Trent, Tutbury, Whitchurch and Great Lever but the results of these matches went unrecorded.

Opponent	Venue	Result
Congleton	H	2–0
Nottingham Forest	A	1–3

=== 1873–74 ===
The only match recorded this season was against Birmingham but the result is unknown.

=== 1874–75 ===
Stoke played Wednesbury Old Athletic, Strollers and Stafford Road but the results went unrecorded.

=== 1875–76 ===
No Matches recorded

=== 1876–77 ===
No Matches recorded

=== 1877–78 ===
For the 1877–78 season the Staffordshire Football Association was formed and immediately set up the Staffordshire Senior Cup for interested teams and Stoke now attracting about 300 spectators decided to enter the competition. Stoke played their first senior match against village side Mow Cop and won by an incredible scoreline of 26–0, a club record. Stoke went on to lift the cup beating Talke Rangers 1–0 in the final. Stoke had now moved to the Victoria Ground and had dropped 'Ramblers' from their name.

Staffordshire Senior Cup

Round	Opponent	Venue	Result
R1	Mow Cop	H	26–0
R2	Hanley Rovers	H	2–0
R3	Leek	H	1–0
Semi final	Ashbourne	H	1–0
Final	Talke Rangers	H	1–0

Friendlies

Opponent	Venue	Result
Next Twenty	H	1–1
Nondescripts	H	1–1
Cobridge	A	1–2
Wednesbury Old Athletic	H	3–0
Manchester	H	2–0
Notts County	H	0–1
Northwich Victoria	A	3–1
Sheffield FA	A	0–4
Nottingham Forest	H	1–0
Birmingham & District	H	2–0
Sudbury	A	5–0
Queen's Park	H	0–1

=== 1878–79 ===
Stoke retained the Staffordshire Senior Cup by beating Cobridge 2–1. Edward Johnson came to the club at this time and he would go on to become the club's first international player.

Staffordshire Senior Cup

Round	Opponent	Venue	Result
R1	Goldenhill	H	3–0
R2	Leek	A	2–0
Semi final	Talke Rangers	A	1–0
Final	Cobridge	H	2–1

Friendlies

Opponent	Venue	Result
Birmingham & District	H	4–1
Notts County	H	1–4
Sudbury	A	1–0
Queen's Park	A	1–4
Nottingham Forest	A	1–2
Macclesfield	A	7–1
Northwich Victoria	A	7–1
Leek	A	2–1
Sunderland	H	1–2
Aston Villa	H	1–1

=== 1879–80 ===
No matches in the Staffordshire Senior Cup and Stoke's results in 1879–80 were mixed.

Staffordshire Senior Cup

No Matches recorded

Friendlies

Opponent	Venue	Result
Nottingham Forest	A	0–3
Aston Villa	A	1–0
Darwen	H	1–1
Blackburn Rovers	A	3–2
Nottingham Forest	H	3–1
Queen's Park	A	1–7

=== 1880–81 ===
Stoke suffered their first cup exit in 1880–81 losing 2–0 away at West Bromwich Albion.

Staffordshire Senior Cup

Round	Opponent	Venue	Result
R1	West Bromwich Albion	A	0–2

Friendlies

Opponent	Venue	Result
Stafford Road	H	4–1

=== 1881–82 ===
Stoke beat Boothen All Saints 7–1 in the first round of the Senior Cup but no more matches were recorded.

Staffordshire Senior Cup

Round	Opponent	Venue	Result
R1	Boothen All Saints	H	7–1

No other matches recorded

Friendlies

Opponent	Venue	Result
Manchester	H	2–1
Bootle	H	3–0
Ashbourne	H	2–1
Market Drayton Town	H	4–2
Notts County	H	1–4

=== 1882–83 ===
Stoke reached the final of the Staffs Senior Cup by scoring 42 goals with Edward Johnson scoring 18. It was all in vain however as Stoke lost in the final to West Bromwich Albion.

Staffordshire Senior Cup

Round	Opponent	Venue	Result
R1	Stoke Priory	H	19–0
R2	Cocknage	H	10–0
R3	Leek White Star	H	7–1
Semi final	Burslem Port Vale	A	1–1
Semi final replay	Burslem Port Vale	H	5–1
Final	West Bromwich Albion	H	2–3

Friendlies

Opponent	Venue	Result
Bootle	A	4–0
Northwich Victoria	H	3–1
Stafford Road	H	2–1
Wirral Birkenhead	A	6–0
Wolverhampton Wanderers	A	0–1
