= Thomas Slaney =

English footballer (1852–1935)

Personal information
- Full name: Thomas Charles Slaney
- Date of birth: 1852
- Place of birth: Stoke-upon-Trent, England
- Date of death: 1935 (aged 82–83)

Senior career*
Years	Team	Apps	(Gls)
1871–1882	Stoke		

Managerial career
- 1874–1883: Stoke
- * Club domestic league appearances and goals

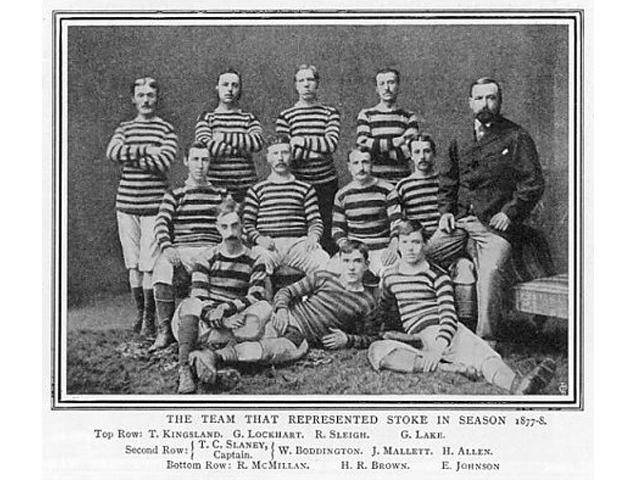
Stoke city football club 1877-78

Thomas Charles Slaney (1852–1935) was an English football player and manager who was the first manager of Stoke.

== Career ==
Slaney was born in Stoke-upon-Trent and attended Stoke St Peter's School where John William Thomas was a teacher. Thomas was the first honorary secretary of the Stoke Ramblers and was well known in the local area for his involvement in football, cricket and athletic clubs, therefore Slaney took a keen interest in local sport. He attended attended St Peter's teacher training and played for the Saltley College Football Club. He went to St John's school in Hanley as a teacher, rising to headmaster within ten years. He began playing football with Stoke and was soon elected club captain. In August 1874 he was appointed honorary secretary, whilst the team was still picked by a committee Slaney effectively organised the club's activities which included arranging away travel and making sure the players knew the kick-off times.

His status ensured that he played in the glamorous centre forward position and he was described as "a fine and dashing player". His style was typical of the time, dribbling alone or in a huddle with other forwards. Slaney took corners and free-kicks and was described as "judicious and energetic". He was renowned for being a model captain, expecting his players to behave with gentlemanly conduct. In the 1877–78 season Slaney lead Stoke to their first piece of silverware by beating Talke Rangers 1–0 in the Staffordshire Senior Cup. Stoke had previously beaten Mow Cop by a club record 26–0 with Slaney reportedly scoring nine of the goals. Stoke retained the cup in 1878–79, defeating Cobridge 2–1.

Slaney faded out the side in the early 1880s with the younger Edward Johnson playing more regularly. He retired as captain in 1882 and he changed the club's colours of black and light blue hoops to red and white stripes and helped the club agree a merger with the Victoria Athletic Club enabling them to play at the Victoria Ground. After Stoke abandoned amateurism status in favour of professionalism Slaney left his position at Stoke. His influence at the Victoria Ground remained as friend and colleague Harry Lockett became Stoke's manager as did his former assistant schoolmaster, Horace Austerberry.

In 1890 Slaney was appointed President of Stoke baseball club, for the upcoming professional 1890 National League of Baseball of Great Britain and was a Director of Preston North End Baseball Club.
