= Arthur Reeve =

Arthur Reeve may refer to:

- Arthur B. Reeve (1880–1936), American mystery writer
- Stretton Reeve (Arthur Stretton Reeve, 1907–1981), English Anglican priest, Bishop of Lichfield
- Arthur W. V. Reeve (1912–2002), New Zealand author and scout leader

== See also ==
- Arthur Reeves (disambiguation)
