= Arthur Reeves =

Arthur Reeves may refer to:

- Arthur Reeves (football manager) (1837–1915), English football manager
- Arthur Reeves (cinematographer) (1892–1954), American cinematographer

== See also ==
- Arthur Reeve (disambiguation)
