= Horace Austerberry =

English football manager (1868–1946)

Personal information
- Full name: Horace Denham Austerberry
- Date of birth: 1868
- Place of birth: Hanley, Staffordshire, England
- Date of death: 1946 (aged 77–78)
- Place of death: Stoke-on-Trent, England

Managerial career
- Years: Team
- 1897–1908: Stoke

Horace Denham Austerberry (1868–1946) was an English football manager who managed Stoke.

== Career ==
Austerberry was born in Hanley and worked at St. John's school as assistant schoolmaster to former Stoke manager Thomas Slaney. It was Slaney who introduced Austerberry to football, inviting him to watch Stoke play and write reports on the game as a journalist. He took over from Bill Rowley as Stoke manager in 1897, allowing Rowley to become his secretary. His first season in charge was a poor and controversial one as Stoke finished bottom of the First Division and had to play in the end of season test matches. They had to play the top two sides from the Second Division, Burnley and Newcastle United. Stoke came through successfully, beating each side once and drawing with Burnley to stay up. In the final test match Stoke and Burnley needed a draw to be in the First Division next season. It finished 0–0 after a farcical 90 minutes during which neither side put in a challenge or had a shot at goal and at one point a few fans in the crowd held on to the ball and refused to return it to the players. After this obvious exploit of the rules the league scrapped the test match system in favour of automatic promotion and relegation. His secretary, Rowley then caused controversy as he arranged his own transfer to Leicester Fosse which included a signing on fee, he was consequently banned from football by the FA.

The 1898–99 season was much better as Stoke took 12th position and also reached the FA Cup semi final for the first time, losing out 3–1 to Derby County. Austerberry became known as a strict disciplinarian and once suspended three players for drinking champagne. He spent eleven seasons in charge of Stoke during which time the club were having serious financial problems. Stoke regularly battled against relegation and only stayed up on the final day of the season on three separate occasions, in 1900–01, 1901–02 and 1903–04, eventually the inevitable happened and Stoke finished bottom in 1906–07. In 1907–08 Stoke failed to mount a promotion challenge and their finances worsened which led to the club being liquidated at the end of the season leaving Austerberry without a job.

== Managerial statistics ==
Managerial record by club and tenure
Team	From	To	Record				
Team	From	To	P	W	D	L	Win %
Stoke	September 1897	May 1908	421	149	89	183	35.4
Total			421	149	89	183	35.4
