= Henry Almond =

English footballer

Harry John Almond
Personal information
- Full name: Harry John Almond
- Date of birth: 17 April 1850
- Place of birth: Westminster, London, England
- Date of death: 12 March 1910 (aged 59)
- Place of death: At Sea, Venezuela
- Position: Centre-forward

Senior career*
Years	Team	Apps	(Gls)
1867–1868	Charterhouse School		
1868–1869	Stoke Ramblers		
- * Club domestic league appearances and goals

Harry John Almond (17 April 1850 – 12 March 1910) helped form Stoke Ramblers (now Stoke City) in the 1860s.

== Life and career ==
Almond was born in Westminster, London in 1850. He attended the private Charterhouse School where he played association football with his house team Gownboys and the School's team. Almond had a major role in forming Stoke Ramblers believed to have been in 1863 when Railway students from the Charterhouse School moved to Stoke-upon-Trent to work as apprentices for the North Staffordshire Railway. Amongst them was Henry Almond who was a keen sportsman and it is believed that he introduced organised club football to the local workers, although there is no record that matches took place. However, in 1868 it was reported in The Field newspaper that Stoke Ramblers had been formed with Almond as its captain and the club was to play under association football rules. It remains unclear as to whether Stoke played any matches from 1863 to 1868. He played in and scored the first ever Stoke goal against E.W May's XV in a friendly on 17 October 1868. He left Staffordshire soon after to continue his career in railway. Later he became a successful Civil Engineer, going abroad to work in Costa Rica for the Venezuela-based La Guayra and Caracas Railway Company. He died at sea the age of 60.
