= Stoke Holding =

Stoke Holding SA
- Founded: 1999; 27 years ago
- Founders: Gunnar Gíslason; Magnus Kristinsson
- Headquarters: Luxembourg

Stoke Holding SA is a company created in 1999 headed by Icelandic businessman Gunnar Gíslason, Magnus Kristinsson and Icelandic lawyers Halldor Birgisson and Stefan Thorisson. The company is based in Luxembourg, and financed by an Icelandic bank Kaupthing.

The company purchased 70% of the shares in Stoke City Football Club from Peter Coates in 1999 for a fee of £3.5m. 10% of these shares were then sold to businessman Phil Rawlins.

On 5 May 2006, the company sold their shares in the club back to Peter Coates for £1.7 million.
