= St Peter's College, Saltley =

School and teacher training establishment in Saltley

Coordinates: 52.4848°N 1.8525°W

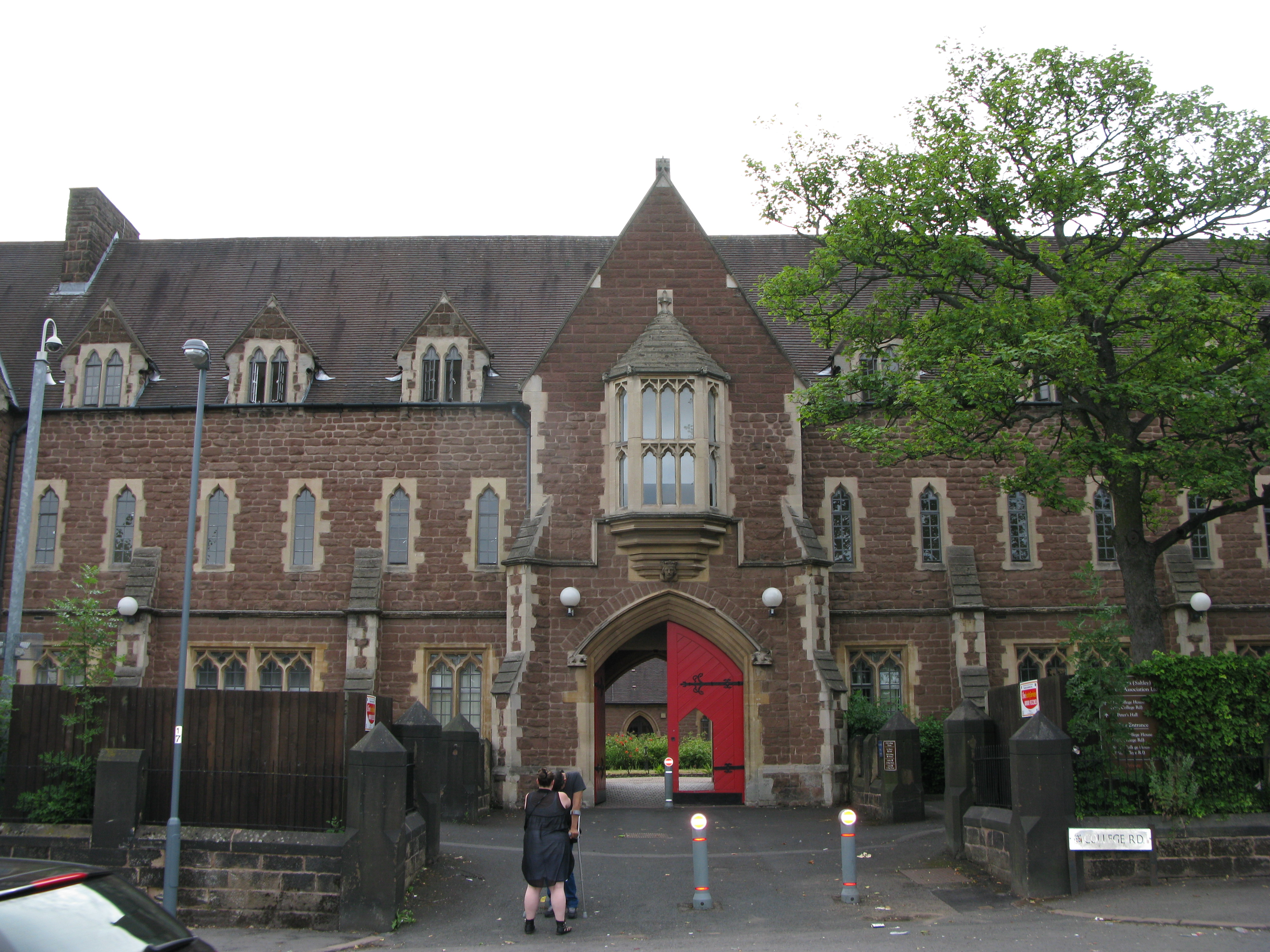
Main entrance gates to the Grade II-listed St Peter's College, Saltley

St Peter's College, Saltley was a teacher training establishment located in Saltley, Birmingham, founded in 1850 in part with help from MP Charles Adderley.

== History ==
As modern Saltley developed, the college first opened as Worcester Diocesan Training School, later known as Worcester, Lichfield & Hereford Diocesan Training College and then Saltley Training College. When the college reopened after World War II, it was known simply as Saltley College, and latterly as St Peter's. The Old Salts' Association (OSA) has an annual reunion on the first Saturday in July at College.

Designed by Gothic Revival architect Benjamin Ferrey, it was built in a Tudor Revival architecture style format of a University of Oxford college, created around a quadrangle at the top of College Road. It housed only 30 trainee teachers initially, which quickly rose to 300 students. The college expanded quickly in the mid-1960s to cope with falling teacher numbers and rising school rolls, with the first female students admitted in 1966. The college closed in 1978. After the Church of England sold the building to the local authority in 1980, it became halls of residence for Aston University. Most recently it was redeveloped as an Urban Village, with accommodation for the local community, students and the elderly, the former college building becoming a multi-use facility, combining homes, offices and meeting rooms.

The funds from the sale of the buildings were used to create the St Peter's Saltley Trust in 1980. The trust has three objectives in its work across the West Midlands of England: lay Christian education; further education; and religious education in schools. The trust generally makes funds available to enable projects which meet its objectives to take place.

The college had its own school, known initially as the Worcester Diocesan Practising School. Located on the junction of College Road and Bridge Road, on opening in 1853 it had two classrooms, one master and 185 boys. A new school room allowed pupil numbers to rise to nearly 500 by 1871. Hit by a Luftwaffe bomb during World War II, the school closed in 1941 and never reopened.

The college's association football club, Saltley College F.C., was one of the first in Birmingham, and reached the Birmingham Senior Cup final in 1880.
