= Chic Bates =

English football player and manager (1949–2025)

Personal information
- Full name: Philip Desmond Bates
- Date of birth: 28 November 1949
- Place of birth: West Bromwich, Staffordshire, England
- Date of death: 13 May 2025 (aged 75)
- Place of death: Shrewsbury, England
- Height: 6 ft 0 in (1.83 m)
- Position: Forward

Senior career*
| Years | Team | Apps | (Gls) |
- Stourbridge
| 1974–1977 | Shrewsbury Town | 160 | (45) |
| 1977–1979 | Swindon Town | 63 | (15) |
| 1979–1980 | Bristol Rovers | 29 | (4) |
| 1980–1986 | Shrewsbury Town | 134 | (19) |
| Total | | 386 | (83) |

Managerial career
- 1984–1987: Shrewsbury Town
- 1997–1998: Stoke City
- 1999: Shrewsbury Town
- 2004: Shrewsbury Town
- * Club domestic league appearances and goals

Philip Desmond "Chic" Bates (28 November 1949 – 13 May 2025) was an English football player and manager.

Bates played non-league football with Stourbridge before becoming a professional with Shrewsbury Town in 1974. He had a fine debut season scoring 17 goals as the "Shrews" gained promotion to the Third Division. He continued to perform well and in 1977 he joined Swindon Town where he spent two years before joining Bristol Rovers. After a year at Rovers he re-joined Shrewsbury Town and in 1984 he became player manager.

He left in 1987 to become assistant manager to Lou Macari at Swindon Town and followed Macari to Stoke City and Celtic and back to Stoke. After Macari left Stoke in May 1997, Bates was appointed as manager and despite a decent start Stoke's form fell away and with the side destined for relegation he was sacked in January 1998. He returned to Shrewsbury and had two spells as caretaker manager.

== Playing career ==
Bates was born in West Bromwich began his career with non-league Stourbridge before joining Shrewsbury Town in 1974. He became a useful forward for the "Shrews" and in his first season as a professional he scored 17 goals helping the team gain promotion. He continued to impress for Shrewsbury and caught the eye of a number of larger clubs and eventually left for Swindon Town in 1978. He spent two years at Swindon and had a short spell at Bristol Rovers before returning to Shrewsbury Town where became player manager.

== Managerial career ==
Bates was appointed player manager of Shrewsbury Town in 1984 and retired from playing in 1985 taking up full-time management a position he would keep until November 1987. He again left Shrewsbury for Swindon Town becoming assistant manager to Lou Macari and Osvaldo Ardiles. When Macari was appointed manager of Stoke City in 1991, he appointed Bates as his assistant and the pair worked together at Stoke until October 1993 when they joined Celtic. A year later, they returned to Stoke and after Macari left again in May 1997, Bates was surprisingly given the vacancy in the club's first season at the Britannia Stadium.

Whilst Bates was a useful and popular coach he was not thought to be a successful manager. Regardless, to Bates's credit Stoke made a steady start to the 1997–98 season and by the end of October Stoke were in a play-off position. But results started to go wrong which hit rock bottom in January 1998 with a 7–0 defeat at home to Birmingham City. The result prompted ugly scenes at the final whistle as around 2,000 fans invaded the pitch and entered the directors box. Bates was sacked a week later. He moved back to Shrewsbury and became assistant manager filling in as caretaker on two occasions firstly in November 1999 and 22 October 2004 to 15 November 2004.

== Personal life and death ==
In 2013, Bates was diagnosed with frontotemporal dementia and Alzheimer's disease.

Bates died on 13 May 2025, at the age of 75, following complications of Alzheimer's and frontotemporal dementia.

== Career statistics ==
Appearances and goals by club, season and competition
| Club | Season | League | | | FA Cup | | League Cup | | Other (Note: Includes Football League Group Cup.) | | Total | |
| Club | Season | Division | Apps | Goals | Apps | Goals | Apps | Goals | Apps | Goals | Apps | Goals |
|---|---|---|---|---|---|---|---|---|---|---|---|---|
| Shrewsbury Town | 1974–75 | Fourth Division | 46 | 17 | 2 | 0 | 2 | 0 | 0 | 0 | 50 | 17 |
| Shrewsbury Town | 1975–76 | Third Division | 43 | 7 | 3 | 3 | 3 | 1 | 0 | 0 | 49 | 11 |
| Shrewsbury Town | 1976–77 | Third Division | 45 | 13 | 5 | 2 | 2 | 0 | 0 | 0 | 52 | 15 |
| Shrewsbury Town | 1977–78 | Third Division | 26 | 8 | 4 | 0 | 2 | 1 | 0 | 0 | 32 | 9 |
| Shrewsbury Town | Total | | 160 | 45 | 14 | 5 | 9 | 2 | 0 | 0 | 183 | 52 |
| Swindon Town | 1977–78 | Third Division | 14 | 1 | 0 | 0 | 0 | 0 | 0 | 0 | 14 | 1 |
| Swindon Town | 1978–79 | Third Division | 42 | 14 | 4 | 2 | 5 | 0 | 0 | 0 | 51 | 16 |
| Swindon Town | 1979–80 | Third Division | 7 | 0 | 0 | 0 | 0 | 0 | 0 | 0 | 7 | 0 |
| Swindon Town | Total | | 63 | 15 | 4 | 2 | 5 | 0 | 0 | 0 | 72 | 17 |
| Bristol Rovers | 1979–80 | Second Division | 11 | 2 | 0 | 0 | 0 | 0 | 0 | 0 | 11 | 2 |
| Bristol Rovers | 1980–81 | Second Division | 18 | 2 | 0 | 0 | 6 | 2 | 0 | 0 | 24 | 4 |
| Bristol Rovers | Total | | 29 | 4 | 0 | 0 | 6 | 2 | 0 | 0 | 35 | 6 |
| Shrewsbury Town | 1980–81 | Second Division | 15 | 2 | 3 | 1 | 0 | 0 | 0 | 0 | 18 | 3 |
| Shrewsbury Town | 1981–82 | Second Division | 40 | 4 | 4 | 3 | 2 | 0 | 5 | 1 | 51 | 8 |
| Shrewsbury Town | 1982–83 | Second Division | 38 | 9 | 1 | 0 | 4 | 0 | 2 | 0 | 45 | 9 |
| Shrewsbury Town | 1983–84 | Second Division | 16 | 3 | 1 | 0 | 2 | 0 | 0 | 0 | 19 | 3 |
| Shrewsbury Town | 1984–85 | Second Division | 20 | 1 | 1 | 0 | 1 | 0 | 0 | 0 | 22 | 1 |
| Shrewsbury Town | 1985–86 | Second Division | 5 | 0 | 0 | 0 | 0 | 0 | 0 | 0 | 5 | 0 |
| Shrewsbury Town | Total | | 134 | 19 | 10 | 4 | 9 | 0 | 7 | 1 | 160 | 24 |
| Career total | | | 386 | 83 | 28 | 11 | 29 | 4 | 7 | 1 | 450 | 99 |

== Managerial statistics ==
Managerial record by team and tenure
| Team | From | To | Record | | | | |
| Team | From | To | P | W | D | L | Win % |
|---|---|---|---|---|---|---|---|
| Shrewsbury Town | 23 July 1984 | 23 November 1987 | 164 | 56 | 38 | 70 | 34.1 |
| Stoke City | 1 July 1997 | 22 January 1998 | 33 | 11 | 9 | 13 | 33.3 |
| Shrewsbury Town | 8 November 1999 | 16 November 1999 | 1 | 0 | 1 | 0 | 0 |
| Shrewsbury Town | 22 October 2004 | 15 November 2004 | 5 | 1 | 1 | 3 | 20 |
| Total | | | 203 | 509 | 69 | 47 | 33.5 |
