= Walter Cox (footballer, born 1849) =

English footballer and manager

Personal information
- Date of birth: 1849
- Place of birth: Stoke-upon-Trent, England
- Date of death: 1925 (aged 75–76)
- Place of death: Stafford, England

Senior career*
Years	Team	Apps	(Gls)
- Talke Rangers
1882–1884	Stoke		

Managerial career
- 1883–1884: Stoke
- * Club domestic league appearances and goals

Walter Cox (1849–1925) was an English footballer and manager for Stoke.

== Career ==
Cox was another ex-Stoke player who stepped into the manager's seat vacated by Thomas Slaney in 1883. Cox's reign however was a comparatively short one, and he was replaced by Harry Lockett after less than a year in charge. He played in and managed the club's first competitive match in the FA Cup which Stoke lost 2–1 against Manchester.

== Career statistics ==
=== Player ===
Club	Season	FA Cup		Total	
Club	Season	Apps	Goals	Apps	Goals
Stoke	1883–84	1	0	1	0
Career Total		1	0	1	0

=== Manager ===
Managerial record by club and tenure
Team	From	To	Record				
Team	From	To	P	W	D	L	Win %
Stoke	June 1883	April 1884	1	0	0	1	0.0
Total			1	0	0	1	0.0
