= Stoke City F.C. =

Association football club in Stoke-on-Trent, England

Stoke City
- Full name: Stoke City Football Club
- Nickname: The Potters
- Founded: 1863; 163 years ago 1868; 158 years ago (first recorded match) (Note: According to Stoke City's official website – and badge – the club were formed in 1863 but they admit that "little evidence still exists of any official matches taking place". The first recorded match played by Stoke Ramblers was in October 1868 against EW May's XV.) as Stoke Ramblers F.C.
- Ground: bet365 Stadium
- Capacity: 30,089
- Owner: Stoke City Holdings Limited
- Chairman: John Coates
- Manager: Mark Robins
- League: EFL Championship
- 2025–26: EFL Championship, 17th of 24
- Website: stokecityfc.com
Home colours	Away colours	Third colours

Stoke City Football Club is a professional football club based in Stoke-on-Trent, Staffordshire, England. They compete in the EFL Championship, the second tier of English football.

Founded as Stoke Ramblers in 1868, the club changed its name to Stoke in 1878 and then to Stoke City in 1925 after Stoke-on-Trent was granted city status. Stoke's home ground is the 30,089 capacity bet365 Stadium. Before it was opened in 1997, the club was based at the Victoria Ground, which was their home ground since 1878. The club's nickname is The Potters, after the pottery industry in Stoke-on-Trent, and their traditional home kit is a red-and-white vertically striped shirt, white shorts and stockings. Their traditional rivals are Midlands clubs West Bromwich Albion and Wolverhampton Wanderers, whilst their local rivals are Port Vale with whom they contest the Potteries derby.

Stoke were one of the twelve founding members of the Football League in 1888. They failed re-election in 1890, but were re-admitted after winning the 1890–91 Football Alliance title. The club were relegated from the First Division in 1907 and entered liquidation the following year. Though the club was saved, they were not re-elected until 1915, and instead spent the intervening years in the Birmingham & District League and Southern League. Promoted from the Second Division in 1921–22, the club were relegated twice in four years by 1926. Stoke won the Third Division North in 1926–27 and then the Second Division title in 1932–33. They remained in the top-flight for twenty years and then spent a decade in the Second Division, before winning promotion as champions in 1962–63.

Under the stewardship of Tony Waddington, Stoke won the League Cup in 1972 with a 2–1 victory over Chelsea. Stoke had also been beaten finalists in 1964. The club spent fourteen years in the top-flight, and would secure promotion in 1978–79 after being relegated two years earlier. Stoke remained in the top-flight from 1979 to 1985, though were relegated to the Third Division in 1990. Having won the Football League Trophy in 1992, they were promoted as champions in 1992–93. Relegation in 1998 allowed the club to win another Football League Trophy title in 2000, before promotion was secured with victory in the 2002 play-off final. Manager Tony Pulis took Stoke into the Premier League at the end of the 2007–08 campaign. They played in the final of the FA Cup in 2011, finishing runners-up to Manchester City, which saw the club qualify for European football. Ten years of Premier League football ended with relegation to the EFL Championship in 2018, where they have remained since.

== History ==
=== Formation and the early years (1863–1919) ===
Graph showing Stoke City F.C.'s progress through the English football league system 1888 to the present

Although there are reports of the game being played in Stoke in 1863 and the club gives this as its official date of formation, the Stoke Ramblers club was formed in 1868 by Henry Almond, who had been a student at Charterhouse school where a dribbling form of the game was popular. Almond arrived in the region to become an apprentice with the North Staffordshire Railway Company and, wishing to continue playing the game that he had enjoyed whilst at school, established the first formal association football club in the region. The club's first documented match was in October 1868, against a scratch team brought together for the occasion by E.W May. Harry Almond captained the Stoke Ramblers team and also scored the club's first goal. The club's first recorded away match was at Congleton, a rugby club that were convinced to play a one-off fixture under association rules, in December 1868. From the 1860s, the club played at the Victoria Cricket Club ground; however they switched to a nearby ground at Sweetings Field in 1875 to cope with rising attendances.

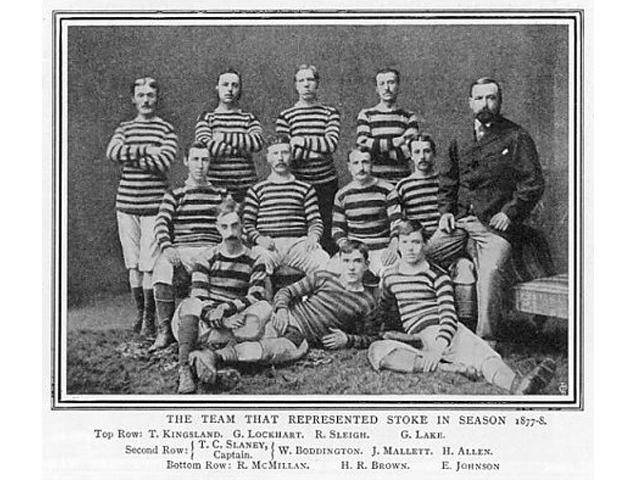
The Stoke team of 1877–78

In 1870, after two seasons as the Ramblers, the club dropped the suffix from its title and became known as Stoke Football Club. It became closely aligned with Stoke Victoria Cricket Club, sharing facilities and some administrative responsibilities. The club played at the Athletic Club ground, which soon became known as the Victoria Ground. It was around this time that the club adopted their traditional red-and-white striped kit. In August 1885, the club turned professional.

Stoke were one of the twelve founding members of the Football League when it was introduced in 1888. The club struggled in their first two seasons, 1888–89 and 1889–90, finishing bottom on both occasions. In 1890 Stoke failed to be re-elected, the first club to do so, and joined the Football Alliance, which they won, and thus were re-elected to the Football League. Stoke spent the next 15 seasons in the First Division and reached the FA Cup semi-final in the 1898–99 season before being relegated in 1907 with severe financial problems. Stoke went bankrupt at the end of the 1907–08 season and entered non-league football, playing in the Birmingham & District League and Southern League until 1915, when the First World War meant the Football League was suspended for four years. However, at the League's Annual General Meeting of that year, Stoke was re-elected to the Second Division at the expense of Glossop. During the wartime period, Stoke entered the Lancashire Primary and Secondary leagues. When football recommenced in August 1919, Stoke were back in the league.

=== Victoria Ground and Stanley Matthews (1919–1937) ===
The club became owners of the Victoria Ground in 1919. This was followed by the construction of the Butler Street stand, which increased the overall capacity of the ground to 50,000. In 1925, Stoke-on-Trent was granted city status and this led the club to change its name to Stoke City F.C.

The 1930s saw the debut of the club's most celebrated player, Stanley Matthews. Matthews, who grew up in Hanley, was an apprentice at the club and made his first appearance in March 1932, against Bury, at the age of 17. By the end of the decade, Matthews had established himself as an England international and as one of the best footballers of his generation. Stoke achieved promotion from the Second Division in 1932–33 – as champions – however Matthews only featured in fifteen games in this season. He did however score his first goal for the club in a 3–1 win against local rivals Port Vale.

By 1934, the club's average attendance had risen to over 23,000, which in turn allowed the club to give the manager Tom Mather increased transfer funds. The club was now considered one of the top teams in the country. It was in this period that the club recorded its record league win, a 10–3 win over West Bromwich Albion in February 1937. In April of that year, the club achieved its record league crowd – 51,373 against Arsenal. Freddie Steele's 33 league goals in the 1936–37 season remains a club record.

=== Title challenge and league decline (1937–1960) ===
Following the resumption of the FA Cup after World War II, tragedy struck on 9 March 1946, as 33 fans died and 520 were injured during a 6th-round away tie against Bolton Wanderers. This came known as the Burnden Park disaster. In 1946–47, Stoke mounted a serious title challenge. The club needed a win in their final game of the season to win the First Division title. However, a 2–1 defeat to Sheffield United meant the title went to Liverpool instead. Stanley Matthews left with 3 games remaining of the 1946–47 season, opting to join Blackpool at the age of 32.

Stoke were relegated from the First Division in 1952–53; during the season Bob McGrory resigned as the club's manager after 17 years in the role. Former Wolverhampton Wanderers defender Frank Taylor took over at the club looking to gain promotion back to the First Division. However, after seven seasons in the Second Division without promotion, Taylor was sacked. Taylor was shocked at being fired and vowed never to be associated with football again.

=== Tony Waddington years (1960–1977) ===
Tony Waddington was appointed as the club's manager in June 1960. He joined the club in 1952 as a coach, before being promoted to assistant manager in 1957. Waddington pulled off a significant coup by enticing Stanley Matthews – then 46 years old – back to the club, 14 years after he had departed. The return of Matthews helped Stoke to an improved eighth position in 1961–62. Promotion was achieved in the following season, with Stoke finishing as champions. In their first season back in the top flight, 1963–64, the team celebrated its centenary and Waddington guided Stoke to a mid-table finish. Stoke reached the 1964 Football League Cup final, which they lost 4–3 to Leicester City over two legs.

Waddington counted on experience; Dennis Viollet, Jackie Mudie, Roy Vernon, Maurice Setters and Jimmy McIlroy were all players signed in the latter stages of their careers. Matthews was awarded a knighthood for services to football in the 1965 New Year's Honours list. This was followed by his final appearance for the club against Fulham in February 1965, shortly after his 50th birthday. Gordon Banks, England's 1966 World Cup-winning goalkeeper, joined in 1967 for £52,000 from Leicester. Regarded as the best goalkeeper in the world, Banks proved to be a shrewd signing for Waddington as he helped the club maintain stability in the First Division. During the close season of 1967, Stoke City played in the one-off United Soccer Association which imported clubs from Europe and South America. Stoke played as the Cleveland Stokers and finished as runner-up of the Eastern Division.

The club won its first major trophy on 4 March 1972 in the League Cup final against Chelsea. Stoke won 2–1 in front of a crowd of 97,852 at Wembley with goals from Terry Conroy and George Eastham. Preceding this victory, Stoke had progressed through 11 games in order to reach the final. This included four games with West Ham United in the semi-final; the two-legged tie was replayed twice. Stoke fared well in the FA Cup; the club progressed to the semi-final stage in both the 1970–71 and 1971–72 seasons. However, on both occasions Stoke lost to Arsenal in a replay. Stoke also competed in the UEFA Cup in 1972 and 1974 losing at the first attempt to 1. FC Kaiserslautern and Ajax respectively.

In January 1976, the roof of the Butler Street Stand was blown off in a storm. The repair bill of nearly £250,000 put the club in financial trouble; key players such as Alan Hudson, Mike Pejic and Jimmy Greenhoff were sold to cover the repairs. With the team depleted, Stoke were relegated in the 1976–77 season. Waddington, after a spell of 17 years in charge, left the club after a 1–0 home defeat to Leicester in March 1977.

=== Managerial roundabout (1977–1997) ===
Waddington's replacement, George Eastham, left in January 1978 after only ten months in charge, and was replaced by Alan Durban from Shrewsbury Town. Durban achieved promotion to the First Division in the 1978–79 season, but after consolidating the club's position in the First Division, he left to manage Sunderland in 1981. Richie Barker was appointed for the 1981–82 season, but was sacked in December 1983 and was replaced by Bill Asprey. Asprey decided to bring back veteran Alan Hudson, and the decision paid off as an improved second half of the season saw Stoke avoid relegation on the final day of the 1983–84 season.

The 1984–85 season proved to be disastrous. Stoke finished the season with only 17 points, with just three wins all season. Mick Mills was appointed player-manager for the 1985–86 season, but was unable to sustain a challenge for promotion in his four seasons as manager and was sacked in November 1989. His successor, Alan Ball Jr., became the club's fifth manager in ten years. Ball struggled in his first season in charge, 1989–90, and Stoke were relegated to the third tier of English football after finishing bottom of the Second Division. Ball kept his job for the start of the following season, 1990–91, but departed during February 1991, in an indifferent season that saw Stoke finish 14th in the Third Division, Stoke's lowest league position.

Ball's successor, Lou Macari, was appointed in May 1991, prior to the start of the 1991–92 season. He clinched silverware for the club; the 1992 Football League Trophy was won with a 1–0 victory against Stockport County at Wembley, with Mark Stein scoring the only goal of the match. The following season, 1992–93, promotion was achieved from the third tier. Macari left for his boyhood club Celtic in October 1993 to be replaced by Joe Jordan; Stein also departed, in a club record £1.5 million move to Chelsea. Jordan's tenure in charge was short, leaving the club less than a year after joining, and Stoke opted to re-appoint Lou Macari only 12 months after he had left. Stoke finished fourth in 1995–96 but were defeated in the play-off semi-final by Leicester City. Macari left the club at the end of the following season. His last match in charge was the final league game at the Victoria Ground. Mike Sheron, who was signed two years previously from Norwich City, was sold for a club record fee of £2.5 million in 1997.

=== Britannia Stadium and the Icelandic takeover (1997–2008) ===
1997–98 saw Stoke move to its new ground, the Britannia Stadium, after 119 years at the Victoria Ground. Chic Bates, Macari's assistant, was appointed manager for the club's first season in the new ground. He did not last long though, and was replaced by Chris Kamara in January 1998. Kamara could not improve the club's fortunes either, and he too left in April. Alan Durban, previously Stoke's manager two decades earlier, took charge for the remainder of season. Despite his best efforts, Durban was unable to keep the club up, as defeat against Manchester City on the final day of the season consigned Stoke to relegation to the third tier.

Brian Little, formerly manager of Aston Villa, took charge for the 1998–99 season. Despite an impressive start, the team's form tailed off dramatically in the latter stages of the season, which led to Little leaving the club at the end of the season. His successor, Gary Megson, was only in the job for four months. Megson was forced to depart following a takeover by Stoke Holding, an Icelandic consortium, who purchased a 66% share in Stoke City F.C. for £6.6 million. Stoke became the first Icelandic-owned football club outside of Iceland. They appointed the club's first foreign manager, Guðjón Þórðarson, who helped Stoke win the Football League Trophy in the 1999–2000 season, with a 2–1 win over Bristol City in front of a crowd of 85,057 at Wembley.

Guðjón achieved promotion at the third time of asking in 2001–02 after previous play-off defeats against Gillingham and Walsall. Cardiff City were defeated in the semi-final before a 2–0 win against Brentford at the Millennium Stadium secured promotion. Despite achieving the goal of promotion, Guðjón was sacked by Gunnar Gíslason just five days later.

Steve Cotterill was drafted in as Guðjón's replacement prior to the start of the 2002–03 season, but resigned in October 2002 after only four months in charge. Tony Pulis was appointed as Stoke's new manager shortly after. Pulis steered Stoke clear of relegation, with a 1–0 win over Reading on the final day of the season keeping the club in the division. However, Pulis was sacked at the end of the 2004–05 season, following disagreement between himself and the club's owners.

Dutch manager Johan Boskamp was named as Pulis' successor on 29 June 2005, only one day after Pulis was sacked. Boskamp brought in a number of new players from Europe, but his side was inconsistent and only a mid-table finish was achieved. Boskamp left at the end of the 2005–06 season amidst a takeover bid by former chairman Peter Coates. On 23 May 2006, Coates completed his takeover of Stoke City, marking the end of Gunnar Gíslason's chairmanship of the club. Coates chose former manager Tony Pulis as Boskamp's successor in June 2006. Pulis took Stoke close to a play-off place, but an eventual eighth-place finish was achieved in the 2006–07 season.

=== Ten years in the Premier League (2008–2018) ===
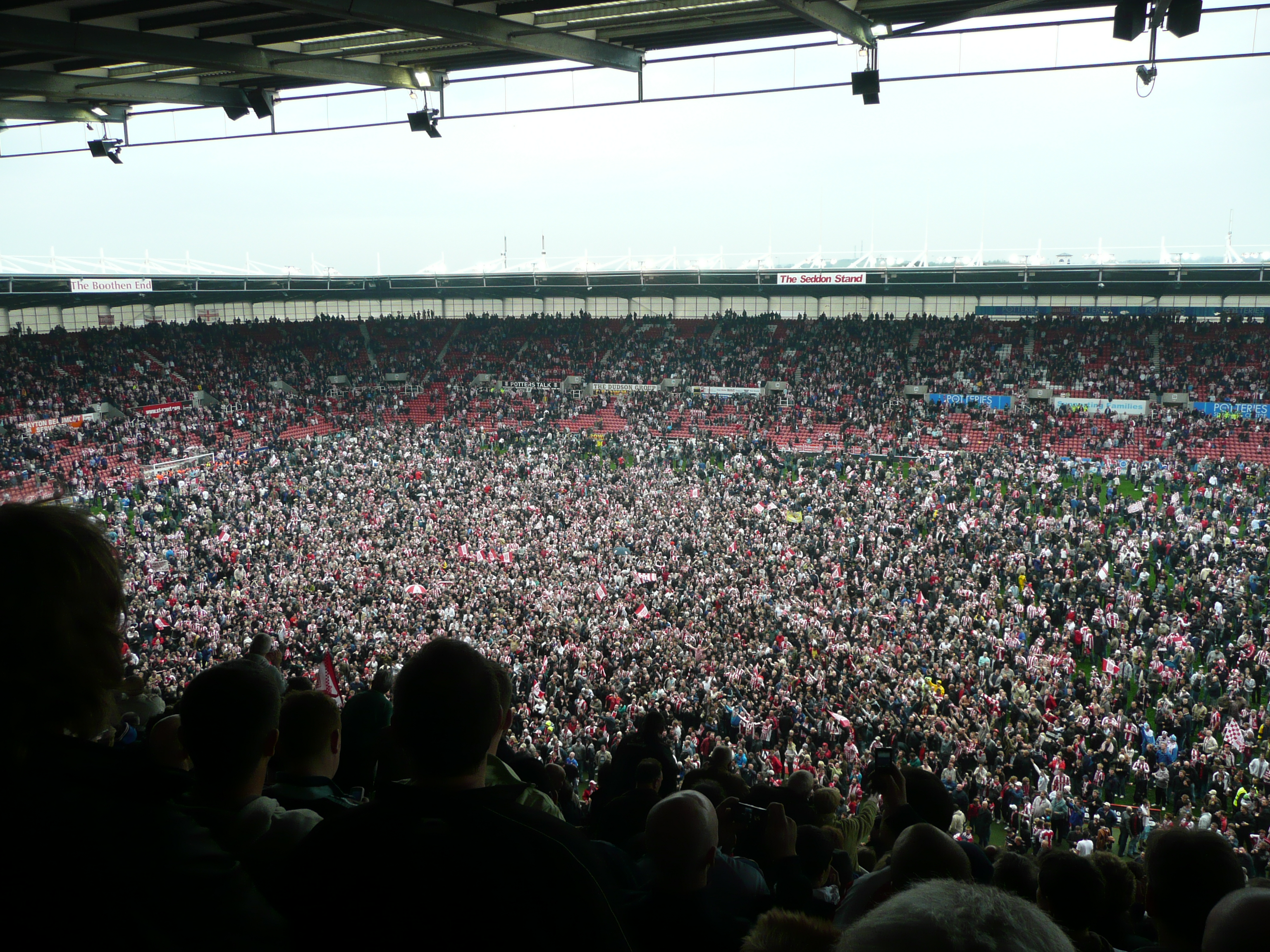
Stoke City fans celebrate following promotion to the Premier League, 4 May 2008.

Stoke won automatic promotion to the Premier League on the final day of the 2007–08 season, finishing in second place in the Championship. A 3–1 defeat to Bolton Wanderers on the opening day of the 2008–09 season saw Stoke written off by many media outlets as relegation certainties. Stoke managed to turn the Britannia Stadium into a "fortress", making it difficult for teams to pick up points there. In their first home match, Stoke defeated Aston Villa 3–2, and wins also came against Tottenham Hotspur, Arsenal, Sunderland and West Bromwich Albion. After a 2–1 win at Hull City, Stoke confirmed their place in the Premier League as the Potters finished 12th in their return to the top flight, with a total of 45 points. Stoke finished the following 2009–10 season in a respectable 11th place, with 47 points. Stoke also made it to the quarter-finals of the FA Cup for the first time since 1972, defeating York City, Arsenal and Manchester City before losing out to eventual winners Chelsea.

Stoke reached the FA Cup final for the first time in 2011, beating Cardiff City, Wolverhampton Wanderers, Brighton & Hove Albion, West Ham United and a famous 5–0 win against Bolton, the largest post-war FA Cup semi-final victory. However, they lost the final 1–0 to Manchester City. By reaching the final, Stoke qualified for the 2011–12 UEFA Europa League. In the Europa League, Stoke advanced past Hajduk Split, Thun and a tough group containing Beşiktaş, Dynamo Kyiv and Maccabi Tel Aviv which Stoke managed to progress through finishing in second position. City's reward was a tie against Spanish giants Valencia and despite putting up a spirited second leg performance, Stoke went out 2–0 on aggregate. In the Premier League, Stoke made the high-profile signing of Peter Crouch as they finished in a mid-table position for a fourth time. The 2012–13 season saw Stoke make little progress, and Pulis left the club by mutual consent on 21 May 2013.

Pulis was replaced by fellow Welshman Mark Hughes, who signed a three-year contract on 30 May 2013. Hughes led Stoke to a ninth-place finish in 2013–14, their highest position in the Premier League and best finish since 1974–75. The 2014–15 season saw Stoke again finish in ninth position this time, with 54 points. Despite breaking their transfer record twice on Xherdan Shaqiri and then Giannelli Imbula, in 2015–16, Stoke did not make any progress and finished in ninth position for a third season running. Stoke declined in 2016–17, finishing in 13th position. In January 2018, Hughes was sacked after a poor run left the club in the relegation zone. He was replaced by Paul Lambert, who could not prevent the club ending their 10-year spell in the Premier League.

=== Return to the Championship (2018–present) ===
Following their relegation to the Championship, Lambert was replaced with former Derby County boss Gary Rowett. Despite spending nearly £50 million on players in the summer transfer window, results and performances were poor and Rowett was subsequently sacked on 8 January 2019 with the team 14th in the table. He was replaced with Luton Town boss Nathan Jones. Stoke went on to end an uneventful 2018–19 season in 16th place with a record number of draws (22). After achieving just two wins in the opening 14 games of the following season, Jones was sacked on 1 November 2019 with the team in the relegation zone. Northern Ireland boss Michael O'Neill was confirmed as his replacement a week later. Results improved under O'Neill and the team managed to avoid relegation, finishing in 15th. Due to the COVID-19 pandemic the entire 2020–21 campaign was played without supporters present as Stoke again finished in mid-table.

The 2021–22 campaign started brightly with the team challenging for the playoffs, though a poor finish to the season saw them finish in 14th. A slow start to the 2022–23 season marked the end for O'Neill's time in charge and he was dismissed in August 2022, with Sunderland boss Alex Neil replacing him. Neil was unable to end Stoke's mid-table positioning and was replaced by Plymouth Argyle's Steven Schumacher in December 2023, who lasted less than a year in charge before also being sacked in September 2024. Narcís Pèlach was announced as Stoke's new manager on 18 September 2024, but was sacked in December 2024; Mark Robins was appointed as manager on 1 January 2025.

== Stadium ==
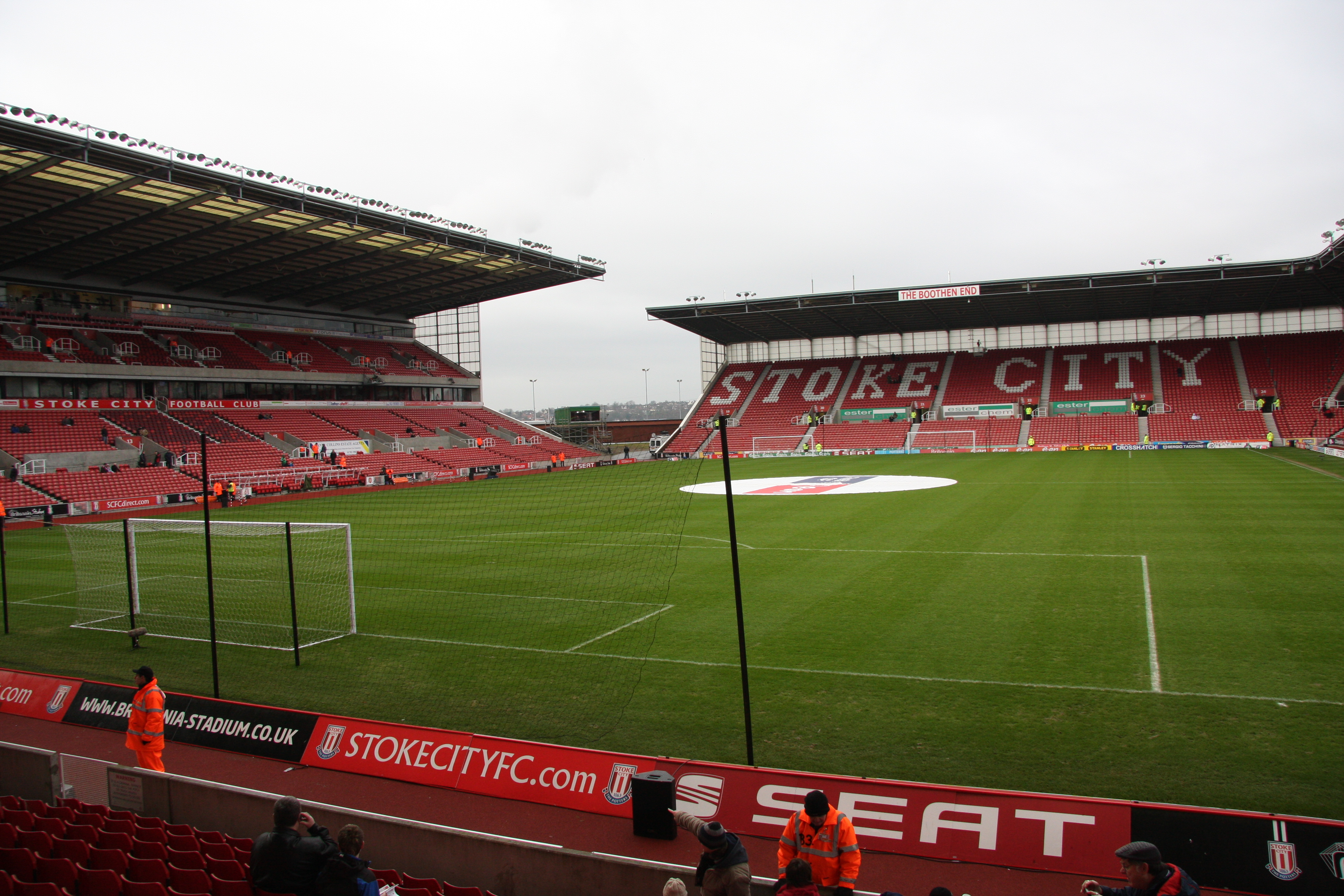
Stoke moved to the all-seater ground now known as the bet365 Stadium in 1997.

It is not clear where Stoke's original playing fields were located. Their first pitch was certainly in the site of a present burial ground in Lonsdale Street, although there is evidence that they also played on land near to the Copeland Arms public house on Campbell Road. In 1875, they moved to Sweetings Field, which was owned by the mayor of Stoke, Alderman Sweeting. It is estimated that as many as 200–250 spectators were attending home matches at Sweetings Field, paying one penny for admission. Stoke were to stay at Sweetings Field until a merger with the Stoke Victoria Cricket Club in March 1878, when Stoke moved to the Victoria Ground.

The first match to be played at the Victoria Ground was the inaugural Staffordshire Cup final against Talke Rangers on 28 March 1878, Stoke won 1–0 in front of 2,500 fans with the goal scored by William Boddington at about the 80th minute. The ground was originally an oval shape to cater for athletics, and this shape was retained for the next 30 years. Major development work began in the 1920s, and by 1930 the ground had lost its original shape. By 1935, the ground capacity was up to 50,000. A record crowd of 51,380 packed into the Ground on 29 March 1937 to watch a league match against Arsenal.

Floodlights were installed in 1956 and another new main stand was built. Over the weekend of the 3/4 in January 1976, gale-force winds blew the roof off the Butler Street Stand. Stoke played a home League match against Middlesbrough at Vale Park whilst repair work was on-going. The Stoke End Stand was improved in 1979 and through the 1980s more improvements were made. By 1995, Stoke drew up plans to make the ground an all seater stadium, to comply with the Taylor Report. However, the club decided it would be better to leave the Victoria Ground and re-locate to a new site.

In 1997, Stoke left the Victoria Ground after 119 years, and moved to the modern 28,384 all seater Britannia Stadium at a cost of £14.7 million. Stoke struggled at first to adjust to their new surroundings and were relegated to the third tier in the first season at the new ground. In 2002, a record 28,218 attended an FA Cup match against Everton. With Stoke gaining promotion to the Premier League in 2008, attendances increased. However, the capacity was reduced to 27,500 due to segregation. The name of the ground was changed to the bet365 Stadium in June 2016. Work began on expanding the stadium to over 30,000 in February 2017 and was concluded in the summer of 2017.

== Supporters ==
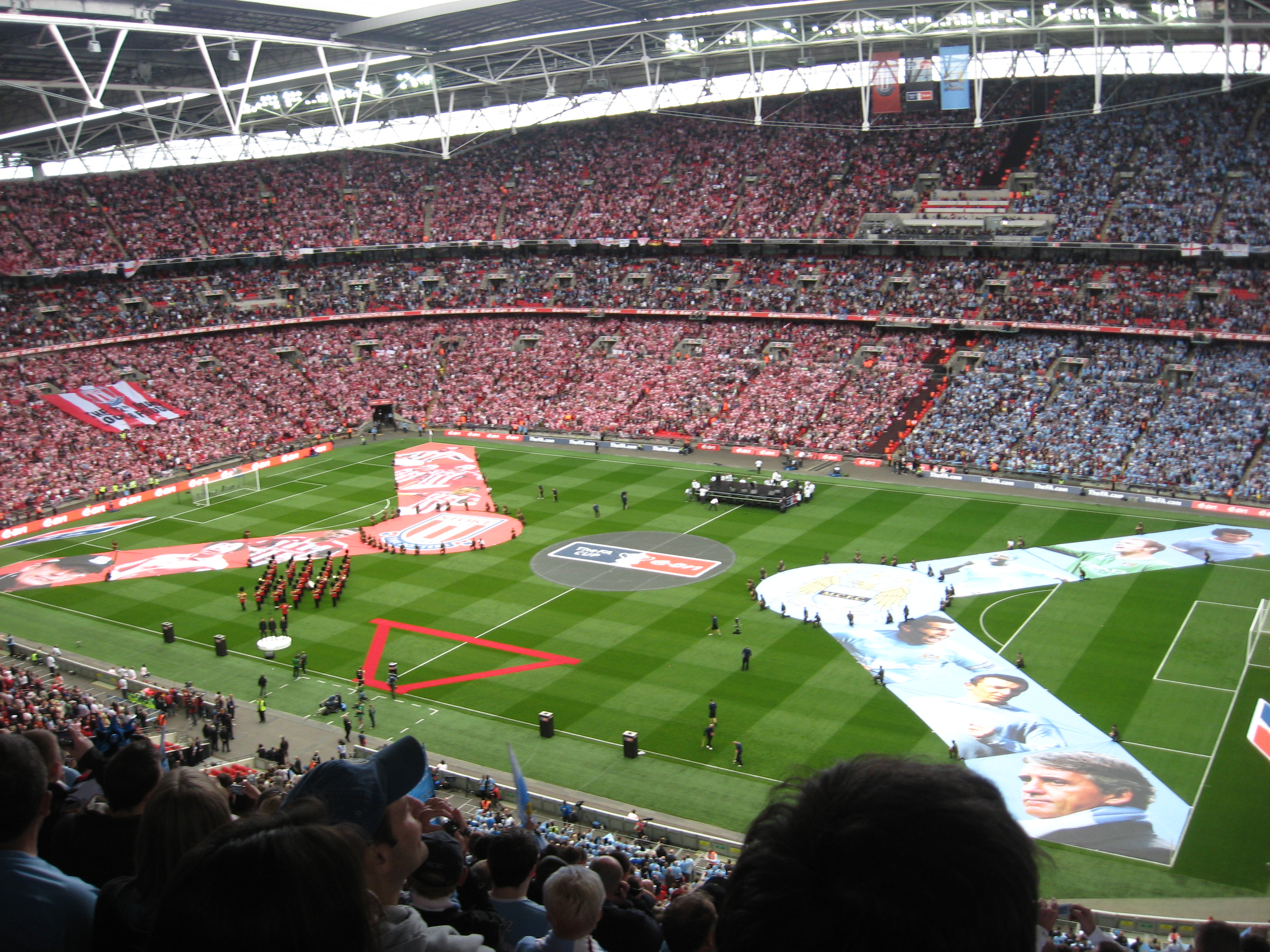
Stoke fans at the 2011 FA Cup final

While much of the support that the club enjoys is from the local Stoke-on-Trent area, there are a number of exile fan clubs, notably in London and stretching from Scandinavia to countries farther afield such as Russia, Canada, the United States and Australia. A capacity crowd regularly turned out to see them in the Premier League.

Stoke have had problems with football hooliganism in the 1970s through the early 2000s, due to the actions of the "Naughty Forty" firm which associated itself with the club and was formed by supporter Mark Chester. Chester reformed himself and now works as a youth inclusion promoter. In 2003, the BBC described Stoke City as having "one of the most active and organised football hooligan firms in England". In response to these criticisms, the club introduced an Away Travel ID scheme. It was subsequently suspended in 2008 as a result of improved behaviour and an enhanced reputation. More recently, Stoke City's fans and stadium have been perceived as loud, friendly, passionate and modern, welcoming as guests Sugar Ray Leonard and Diego Maradona. There is in the media now "genuine admiration for the volume and volatility of the club's loyal support". Stoke announced that they would offer supporters free bus travel to every Premier League away game in the 2013–14 and 2014–15 seasons.

In November 2008, a group of Stoke fans was forced by the Greater Manchester Police to leave Manchester before a league match against Manchester United. The human rights group Liberty took up their case, and the Greater Manchester police eventually apologised for their actions and the fans received compensation.

Supporters of the club have adopted "Delilah" as their anthem since the 1970s, when a supporter was heard singing it in a local pub. Some of the song's lyrics have been adapted for the terraces, but most remain the same. Stoke's official club anthem is "We'll be with you", which was recorded by the Stoke players prior to the 1972 Football League Cup final.

Between 2008 and 2011, local fan "Pottermouth" contributed a series of raps to BBC Radio Stoke about Stoke's promotion, their battle to stay in the Premier League, and the 2011 FA Cup final.

== Rivalries ==
Stoke's local rivals are Port Vale, based in the Burslem area of Stoke-on-Trent. As the two clubs have regularly been in different divisions, there have only been 46 league matches between the two sides, with the last match being in 2002. Regardless of the lack of matches, the Potteries derby is often a tight and close game of football with few goals being scored. Stoke have won 19 matches while Vale have won 15.

Due to the rarity of this fixture, Stoke have more established rivalries with Midlands clubs Derby County, West Bromwich Albion and Wolverhampton Wanderers. A rivalry with Welsh side Cardiff City was formed in the 2001–02 season where the sides played each other in the Second Division play-offs.

== Kit and crest ==
=== Kit ===
Stoke's traditional kit is red and white striped shirts with white shorts and socks. Their first strip was navy and cardinal hoops with white knickerbockers and hooped stockings. This changed to black and blue hoops before the club settled on red and white stripes in 1883. However, in 1891 the Football League decided that only one club could use one style of strip per season and Sunderland were allowed to take red and white stripes. So between 1891 and 1908 Stoke used a variety of kits with plain maroon being the most common. In 1908, Stoke lost their League status and were able to finally revert to red and white and when they re-joined the league in 1919 the rule was scrapped. Since then, Stoke have forever used red and white striped shirts, with the only time when they diverted from this was for two seasons in the mid-1980s, which saw them wear a pin-striped shirt.

=== Crest ===
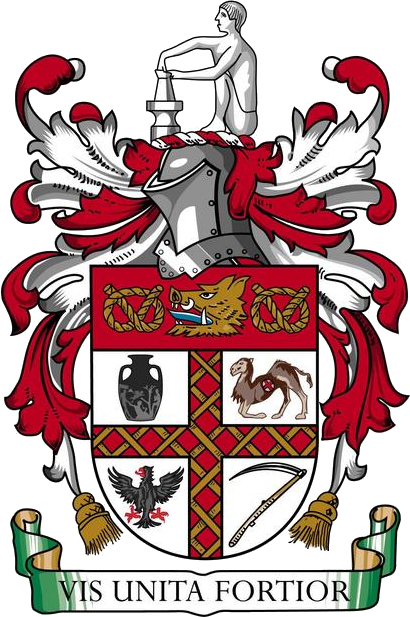
Stoke-on-Trent coat of arms, used as club crest from the 1950s to 1977, and from 1992 to 2001

Crest used from 2001–2026

Stoke's first club crest was a stylised "S" which was used by players in 1882 who would stitch the crest on to their shirts; however, this practice soon faded away. In the 1950s Stoke began using the shield from the Stoke-on-Trent coat-of-arms which was used infrequently until 1977. A new and simpler club crest was introduced a Stafford knot and pottery kiln represented local tradition while red and white stripes were also added. This lasted until 1992 when the club decided to use the entire Stoke-on-Trent coat-of-arms which included the club's name at the top of the crest. They changed their crest in 2001 to the current version which includes their nickname "The Potters". For the 2012–13 season, they used a special version to mark the club's 150th anniversary which included the club's Latin motto "Vis Unita Fortior" ("United Strength is Stronger"). In August 2025, Stoke unveiled a new crest to be used from the 2026–27 season based on the one used from 1977 to 1992, featuring a bottle kiln, Staffordshire knot, foundation year and red and white stripes.

=== Sponsorship ===
Period	Sportswear	Sponsor
1974–1975	Admiral	None
1975–1980	Umbro	None
1981–1985	Umbro	Ricoh
1985–1986	Umbro	None
1986–1987	Hi-Tec	Cristal Tiles
1987–1989	Admiral	Cristal Tiles
1989–1990	Scoreline	Cristal Tiles

Period	Sportswear	Sponsor
1990–1991	Matchwinner	Fradley Homes
1991–1993	Matchwinner	Ansells
1993–1995	Asics	Carling
1995–1996	Asics	Broxap
1996–1997	Asics	Asics
1997–2001	Asics	Britannia
2001–2003	Le Coq Sportif	Britannia

Period	Sportswear	Sponsor
2003–2007	Puma	Britannia
2007–2010	Le Coq Sportif	Britannia
2010–2012	Adidas	Britannia
2012–2014	Adidas	bet365
2014–2015	Warrior	bet365
2015–2016	New Balance	bet365
2016–	Macron	bet365

== Records ==
Record appearances:

- Eric Skeels – 592 appearances (league and cup)
- John McCue – 675 appearances (including war-time games)

Record goalscorers:

- John Ritchie – 176 goals (league and cup goals)
- Freddie Steele – 140 goals (league goals)

Record signing:

- Giannelli Imbula signed from Porto: £18.3 million (1 February 2016)

Record sale:

- Marko Arnautović sold to West Ham United: £20 million (22 July 2017)

Record results:

- Record win: 26–0 v. Mow Cop (1877)
- Record League victory: 10–3 v. West Bromwich Albion (4 February 1937)
- Record League defeat: 0–10 v. Preston North End (14 September 1889)
- Record Premier League win: 6–1 v. Liverpool (24 May 2015)
- Record Premier League defeat: 0–7 v. Chelsea (25 April 2010)
- Record FA Cup victory: 11–0 v. Stourbridge (26 September 1914)
- Record FA Cup defeat: 0–8 v. Wolverhampton Wanderers (22 February 1890)
- Record League Cup victory: 6–1 v. Rotherham United (29 August 2023)
- Record League Cup defeat: 0–8 v. Liverpool (29 November 2000)

Attendance records:

- 51,130 at the Victoria Ground v. Arsenal (29 March 1937)
- 30,022 at the bet365 Stadium v. Everton (17 March 2018)

=== European record ===
Season	Competition	Round	Opponent	Home	Away	Aggregate
1972–73	UEFA Cup	First round	(Germany) 1. FC Kaiserslautern	3–1	0–4	3–5
1974–75	UEFA Cup	First round	(Netherlands) Ajax	1–1	0–0	1–1 (A)
2011–12	UEFA Europa League	Third qualifying round	(Croatia) Hajduk Split	1–0	1–0	2–0
2011–12	UEFA Europa League	Play–off round	(Switzerland) Thun	4–1	1–0	5–1
2011–12	UEFA Europa League	Group E	(Turkey) Beşiktaş	2–1	1–3	2nd
2011–12	UEFA Europa League	Group E	(Ukraine) Dynamo Kyiv	1–1	1–1	2nd
2011–12	UEFA Europa League	Group E	(Israel) Maccabi Tel Aviv	3–0	2–1	2nd
2011–12	UEFA Europa League	Round of 32	(Spain) Valencia	0–1	0–1	0–2

== Players ==
=== First-team squad ===
As of 5 September 2026

Note: Flags indicate national team as defined under FIFA eligibility rules; some limited exceptions apply. Players may hold more than one non-FIFA nationality.

No.	Pos.	Nation	Player
1	GK	SWE	Viktor Johansson (captain)
2	DF	ENG	Ben Johnson (on loan from Ipswich Town)
3	DF	ENG	Aaron Cresswell
4	MF	ENG	Ben Pearson
5	DF	SCO	Luke Graham
6	MF	SWE	Svante Ingelsson
7	MF	USA	Jack McGlynn
8	MF	NIR	Ethan Galbraith
9	FW	SVK	Róbert Boženík
10	MF	KOR	Bae Jun-ho
11	FW	FRA	Lamine Cissé
13	MF	NIR	Justin Devenny
14	FW	ENG	Ato Ampah
15	FW	SCO	George Hirst

No.	Pos.	Nation	Player
16	DF	ENG	Ben Wilmot
17	DF	FRA	Eric Bocat
18	MF	IRL	Bosun Lawal
19	MF	SVK	Tomáš Rigo
20	FW	ENG	Sam Gallagher
21	DF	USA	Luca Bombino
22	DF	CMR	Junior Tchamadeu
23	DF	ENG	Ben Gibson
24	GK	ENG	Josh Griffiths
27	MF	SEN	Djibril Soumaré
34	GK	ENG	Frank Fielding
40	DF	UKR	Maksym Talovierov
42	FW	NED	Million Manhoef

==== Out on loan ====
Note: Flags indicate national team as defined under FIFA eligibility rules; some limited exceptions apply. Players may hold more than one non-FIFA nationality.

No.	Pos.	Nation	Player
25	GK	ENG	Tommy Simkin (at Doncaster Rovers until 30 June 2027)
35	FW	ENG	Nathan Lowe (at Hibernian until 30 June 2027)
37	FW	ENG	Emre Tezgel (at Wycombe Wanderers until 30 June 2027)

No.	Pos.	Nation	Player
49	FW	NED	Milan Smit (at Darmstadt until 30 June 2027)
50	DF	KEN	Sydney Agina (at Tamworth until 1 November 2026)
56	MF	ENG	Favour Fawunmi (at Oldham Athletic until 30 June 2027)

=== Former players ===
For details of former players, see List of Stoke City F.C. players, List of Stoke City F.C. players (25–99 appearances), List of Stoke City F.C. players (1–24 appearances) and Category:Stoke City F.C. players.

=== Player records ===
For player records, including player awards, see List of Stoke City F.C. records and statistics.

== Club management ==
As of 22 October 2026

Position	Name
Board & Directors
Chair	John Coates
Vice Chair	Richard Smith
Director	Peter Coates
Club Management
Managing Director	Richard Smith
Chief Operating Officer	Simon King
Sporting Director	Jonathan Walters
Technical Director	Stuart Harvey
Head of Recruitment	Ian Torrance
Head of Safety Operations	Clare Buckley
Head of Supporter Experience	Anthony Emmerson
Head of Partnerships	Steven Forrest
Head of Finance	David Heath
Head of Marketing & Communications	Thomas Holdcroft
Head of Football Administration	Chris Laird
Head of Retail and Ticketing	Nathan Le-Moine
Director of Community Engagement	Laura Nicholls
Head of Safeguarding and EDI	Paul Richards
Head of Facilities	Nick Robinson
Head of Venue	Craig Simmonds
Grounds Manager	Andy Jackson
First Team Management
Manager	Mark Robins
Assistant Manager	Max Porter
Assistant Manager	James Rowberry
First Team Coach	Ryan Shawcross
Goalkeeper Coach	Darren Behcet
Head of Medical and Performance	Damian Roden
Head of Performance	Joel Dawson
Head of Medical Services	Matt Lancett
Kit Manager	Max Shapland
Academy Management
Academy Director	Jack Higgins
Head of Academy Recruitment	Andrew Frost
Head of Academy Education	Greg Briggs
Head of Academy Medical	Jordan Beech
Head of Academy Sports Science	Ben Cope
Academy Safeguarding Lead	Wayne Taylor
Under-21 Lead Coach	Sam Stockley
Under-21 Coach	Warren Joyce
Under-21 Coach	Liam Lawrence
Under-21 Coach	Erik Pieters
Under-18 Lead Coach	Dean Marney
Under-18 Coach	Andy Matthews
Under-18 Coach	Danny Pugh
Women Team Management
Performance Director	Stephanie Wakelin
Head Coach	Sarah Richardson

=== Managerial history ===
Dates	Name	Notes
August 1874 – June 1883	(England) Thomas Slaney	
June 1883 – April 1884	(England) Walter Cox	
April 1884 – August 1890	(England) Harry Lockett	
August 1890 – January 1892	(England) Joseph Bradshaw	
January 1892 – May 1895	(England) Arthur Reeves	
May 1895 – September 1897	(England) Bill Rowley	
September 1897 – March 1908	(England) Horace Austerberry	
May 1908 – June 1914	(England) Alfred Barker	
June 1914 – April 1915	(Scotland) Peter Hodge	First manager not from England
April 1915 – Feb 1919	(England) Joe Schofield	
February 1919 – March 1923	(England) Arthur Shallcross	
March 1923 – April 1923	(England) John Rutherford	
October 1923 – June 1935	(England) Tom Mather	
June 1935 – May 1952	(Scotland) Bob McGrory	
June 1952 – June 1960	(England) Frank Taylor	
June 1960 – March 1977	(England) Tony Waddington	Most honours won as manager
February 1977 – January 1978	(England) George Eastham	
January 1978 – February 1978	(England) Alan A'Court	Caretaker manager
February 1978 – June 1981	(Wales) Alan Durban	
June 1981 – December 1983	(England) Richie Barker	
December 1983 – April 1985	(England) Bill Asprey	
April 1985 – May 1985	(England) Tony Lacey	Caretaker manager
May 1985 – November 1989	(England) Mick Mills	
November 1989 – February 1991	(England) Alan Ball	
February 1991 – May 1991	(England) Graham Paddon	Caretaker manager
May 1991 – October 1993	(Scotland) Lou Macari	
November 1993 – September 1994	(Scotland) Joe Jordan	
September 1994	(Scotland) Asa Hartford	Caretaker manager
October 1994 – July 1997	(Scotland) Lou Macari	
July 1997 – January 1998	(England) Chic Bates	
January 1998 – April 1998	(England) Chris Kamara	
April 1998 – June 1998	(Wales) Alan Durban	Caretaker manager
June 1998 – June 1999	(England) Brian Little	
July 1999 – November 1999	(England) Gary Megson	
November 1999 – May 2002	(Iceland) Guðjón Þórðarson	First manager from outside the United Kingdom
May 2002 – October 2002	(England) Steve Cotterill	
October 2002 – November 2002	(Scotland) Dave Kevan	Caretaker manager
November 2002 – June 2005	(Wales) Tony Pulis	
June 2005 – May 2006	(Netherlands) Johan Boskamp	
June 2006 – May 2013	(Wales) Tony Pulis	First manager to reach the FA Cup final with Stoke
May 2013 – January 2018	(Wales) Mark Hughes	
January 2018	(Wales) Eddie Niedzwiecki	Caretaker manager
January 2018 – May 2018	(Scotland) Paul Lambert	
May 2018 – January 2019	(England) Gary Rowett	
January 2019 – November 2019	(Wales) Nathan Jones	
November 2019	(Republic of Ireland) Rory Delap	Caretaker manager
November 2019 – August 2022	(Northern Ireland) Michael O'Neill	
August 2022	(England) Dean Holden	Caretaker manager
August 2022 – December 2023	(Scotland) Alex Neil	
December 2023	(Scotland) Paul Gallagher	Caretaker manager
December 2023 – September 2024	(England) Steven Schumacher	
September 2024	(England) Alex Morris & Ryan Shawcross	Caretaker managers
September 2024 – December 2024	(Spain) Narcís Pèlach	
December 2024 – January 2025	(England) Ryan Shawcross	Caretaker manager
January 2025 –	(England) Mark Robins	

== Honours ==
Stoke City's honours include the following:

League

- Second Division / Championship (level 2)
  - Champions: 1932–33, 1962–63
  - Runners-up: 1921–22, 2007–08
  - Promoted: 1978–79
- Third Division North / Second Division (level 3)
  - Champions: 1926–27, 1992–93
  - Play-off winners: 2002
- Football Alliance
  - Champions: 1890–91
- Birmingham & District League
  - Champions: 1910–11
- Southern League Division Two
  - Champions: 1909–10, 1914–15
  - Runners-up: 1910–11

Cup

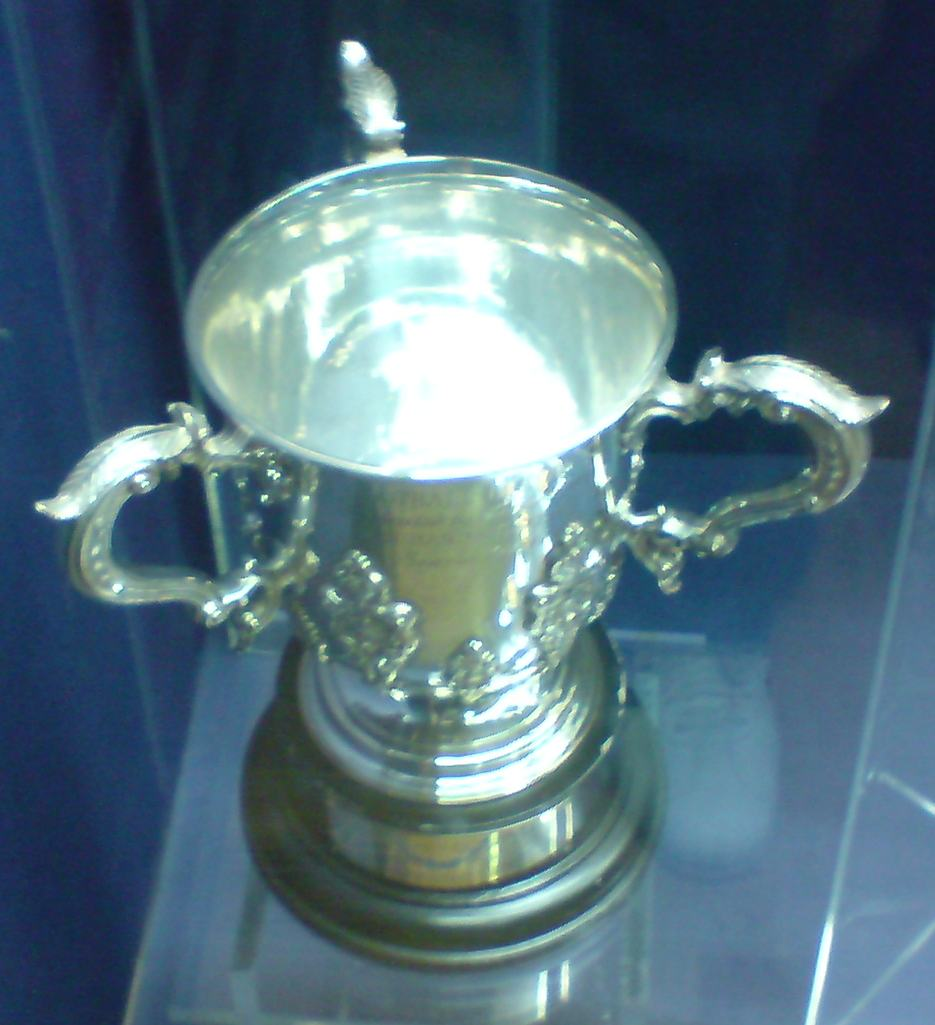
Stoke won the League Cup in 1972, their first major trophy.

- FA Cup
  - Runners-up: 2010–11
- League Cup
  - Winners: 1971–72
  - Runners-up: 1963–64
- Football League Trophy
  - Winners: 1991–92, 1999–2000
- Watney Cup
  - Winners: 1973

Minor

- Staffordshire Senior Cup
  - Winners (19): 1877–78, 1878–79, 1903–04, 1913–14, 1920–21, 1929–30, 1933–34, 1938–39, 1947–48, 1964–65, 1968–69, 1970–71, 1974–75, 1975–76, 1981–82, 1992–93, 1994–95, 1998–99, 2016–17
  - Runners-up: 1882–83, 1885–86, 1890–91, 1895–96, 1896–97, 1900–01, 1901–02, 1902–03, 1923–24, 1925–26, 1934–35, 1951–52, 1971–72, 1973–74, 1980–81, 2002–03, 2005–06, 2010–11
- Birmingham Senior Cup
  - Winners: 1901, 1914
  - Runners-up: 1910, 1915, 1920, 1921
- Isle of Man Trophy
  - Winners: 1987, 1991, 1992
  - Runners-up: 1985
