= Cowan Lake =

Cowan Lake may refer to:

== Antarctica ==
- Lake Cowan (Antarctica)

== Canada ==
- Cowan Lake (Saskatchewan)

== United States ==
- Cowan Lake (Georgia) reservoir in Rockdale County
- Cowan Lake (Michigan) in Kent County
- Cowan Lake (Minnesota) in Lake County
- Cowan Lake (Carroll County, Missouri) reservoir and dam
- Cowan Lake East reservoir and dam in Cedar County, Missouri
- Cowan Lake West reservoir and dam in Cedar County, Missouri
- Cowan Lake (Maries County, Missouri) reservoir and dam
- Cowan Lake (New Mexico) in Otero County
- Cowan Lake (Ohio) reservoir and dam in Clinton County
- Cowans Gap Lake reservoir in Fulton County, Pennsylvania
- Cowan Lake (Texas) reservoir and dam in Baylor County

=== Other ===
- Cowan Lake Sailing Association
- Cowan Lake State Park
