= Teddy Bennett =

English footballer

Personal information
- Full name: Edward Bennett
- Date of birth: 1862
- Place of birth: Stoke-upon-Trent, England
- Position: Forward

Senior career*
Years	Team	Apps	(Gls)
1883–1886	Stoke		
- Leek Welfare
- * Club domestic league appearances and goals

Edward Bennett (1862 – unknown) was an English footballer who played for Stoke.

== Career ==
Bennett joined Stoke in 1883. He played in the club's first competitive match in the FA Cup which was against Manchester in a 2–1 defeat. He scored four goals in two cup matches during the 1886–87 season. He left the club at the end of 1887 and played for Leek Welfare.

== Career statistics ==
Club	Season	FA Cup		Total	
Club	Season	Apps	Goals	Apps	Goals
Stoke	1883–84	1	0	1	0
Stoke	1884–85	0	0	0	0
Stoke	1885–86	0	0	0	0
Stoke	1886–87	2	4	2	4
Career Total		3	4	3	4
