= Edgar Montford =

Welsh footballer

Personal information
- Full name: Edgar William John Montford
- Date of birth: 25 April 1865
- Place of birth: Newtown, Powys, Wales
- Date of death: 1940 (aged 75)
- Position: Full-back

Senior career*
Years	Team	Apps	(Gls)
1885	Newtown		
1885–1890	Stoke	5	(0)
1890	Leek		
- * Club domestic league appearances and goals

Edgar William John Montford (25 April 1865 – 1940) was a Welsh footballer who played for Stoke in the Football League.

== Football career ==
Montford was signed from Welsh side Newtown in 1885 he played in eight competitive games for Stoke with five of them coming in the Football League. He left Stoke in 1890 to play for Leek. Edgar also had a brother, Harry Montford who also played for Stoke.

== Professional baseball ==
In 1890 Montford played professional baseball for Stoke in the National League of Baseball of Great Britain.

== Career statistics ==
Club	Season	League			FA Cup		Total	
Club	Season	Division	Apps	Goals	Apps	Goals	Apps	Goals
Stoke	1885–86	–	–		2	0	2	0
Stoke	1886–87	–	–		0	0	0	0
Stoke	1887–88	–	–		0	0	0	0
Stoke	1888–89	The Football League	0	0	1	0	1	0
Stoke	1889–90	The Football League	5	0	0	0	5	0
Career total			5	0	3	0	8	0
