= Harry Montford =

English footballer

Personal information
- Full name: Henry James Parker Montford
- Date of birth: 21 June 1863
- Place of birth: Market Drayton, Shropshire
- Date of death: April–June 1942 (aged 78)
- Position: Forward

Senior career*
Years	Team	Apps	(Gls)
1887	Newtown		
1888–1889	Stoke	1	(0)
1890	Leek		
- * Club domestic league appearances and goals

Henry James Parker Montford (21 June 1863 – 1942) was an English footballer who played for Stoke.

== Career ==
Montford, unlike his brother Edgar Montford, was born in England but Edgar was born in Newtown, Wales and so there was a family connection to the town. Montford's first club was Newtown and he signed for then sometime between 1882 and 1887. He joined Stoke in August 1888 where his brother Edgar was playing. The Montfords were the first set of brothers to represent Stoke at football.

Montford, playing as a forward, made his Stoke and League debut at Victoria Ground. The visitors were Accrington and the home team were defeated 4–2. He was a member of Stoke's reserve side the 'Swifts' and was overlooked by manager Harry Lockett for the first team making just one league appearance in the 1888–89 season. His only other senior appearance came in the FA Cup against Warwick County, Stoke losing 2–1.

At the end of the season most of the reserve players, including Montford, were released. He signed for Leek in May 1889.

== Career statistics ==
Appearances and goals by club, season and competition
Club	Season	League			FA Cup		Total	
Club	Season	Division	Apps	Goals	Apps	Goals	Apps	Goals
Stoke	1888–89	The Football League	1	0	1	0	2	0
Career total			1	0	1	0	2	0
