= William Smalley =

William Smalley may refer to:

- Bill Smalley (1864–1912), English footballer
- William Smalley (pioneer) (1759/1760–1840), Ohio settler
- William A. Smalley (1923–1997), American linguist
- William E. Smalley, American Episcopal bishop
- Will Smalley (1871–1891), American baseball player
