= Charlie Hassall =

English footballer

Personal information
- Full name: Charles Hassall
- Date of birth: 1863
- Place of birth: Stoke-upon-Trent, England
- Position: Goalkeeper

Senior career*
Years	Team	Apps	(Gls)
1887	Judes		
1888–1889	Stoke	0	(0)
1889	Leek		
- * Club domestic league appearances and goals

Charles Hassall (1863 – after 1889) was an English footballer who played for Stoke.

== Career ==
Hassall played for Judes before he joined Stoke in 1888. He was a member of Stoke's reserve side the 'Swifts' and was overlooked by manager Harry Lockett for the first team. His only senior appearance came in the FA Cup against Warwick County. Stoke lost and most of the reserve players including Hassall were released. He later went on to play for Leek.

== Career statistics ==
Appearances and goals by club, season and competition
Club	Season	League			FA Cup		Total	
Club	Season	Division	Apps	Goals	Apps	Goals	Apps	Goals
Stoke	1888–89	The Football League	0	0	1	0	1	0
Career total			0	0	1	0	1	0
