= Tunnicliffe =

Tunnicliffe or Tunnicliff is a surname, and may refer to:

== Arts and entertainment ==
- Charles Tunnicliffe (1901-1979), British painter and illustrator
- Jayne Tunnicliffe (born 1967), British actress

== Sport ==
=== Association football ===
- Billy Tunnicliffe (1920-1997), English footballer, mostly played for Bournemouth, Wrexham and Bradford City
- Billy Tunnicliffe (footballer, born 1864), English footballer, played for Stoke, some other clubs
- James Tunnicliffe (born 1989), English footballer, played for Stockport County and many other clubs
- John Tunnicliffe (footballer) (fl. 1866 – 1892), English footballer, played for Stoke and some other clubs
- Jordan Tunnicliffe (born 1993), English footballer, has played for many English clubs
- Ryan Tunnicliffe (born 1992), English footballer, has played for Fulham, Luton, Portsmouth, and various other clubs

=== Other sports ===
- Anna Tunnicliffe (born 1982), US sailor
- Colin Tunnicliffe (born 1951), British cricketer
- John Tunnicliffe (1866-1948), British cricketer
- Miles Tunnicliff (born 1968), British golfer

== Other fields ==
- Damon G. Tunnicliff (1829-1901), American jurist
- Denis Tunnicliffe, Baron Tunnicliffe (born 1943), British politician and transport executive
- Garry Tunnicliffe (born 1966), air vice-marshal in Britain's Royal Air Force
- Geoff Tunnicliffe (fl. 1980s – present), US-Canadian Christian evangelical leader
- Jabez Tunnicliff (1809-1865), British Baptist minister and founder of the Band of Hope temperance movement
- John Tunnicliff (c. 1725 – 1800), US colonial figure
- William W. Tunnicliffe (c. 1922 – 1996), Canadian computer specialist
