= Albert Bourne (disambiguation) =

Albert Bourne may refer to:

- Albert Bourne (1863–1930), English footballer
- Albert Bourne (footballer, born 1934) (1934–2015), English footballer, see List of Oldham Athletic A.F.C. players (25–99 appearances)
