= George Shutt =

English footballer and referee

Personal information
- Full name: George Shutt
- Date of birth: 18 December 1861
- Place of birth: Fenton, Staffordshire, England
- Date of death: 6 August 1936 (aged 74)
- Place of death: Hanley, England
- Position: Half-back

Senior career*
Years	Team	Apps	(Gls)
- Stoke Priory
1880–1889	Stoke	21	(1)
1889–1891	Hanley Town		
1891–1893	Burslem Port Vale	1	(0)
- Hanley Town
Total		22	(1)

International career
1886	England	1	(0)
- * Club domestic league appearances and goals

George Shutt (18 December 1861 – 6 August 1936) was an English international footballer who played at half-back. He won a cap for England in 1886 and played for Stoke in the 1880s. He also represented Hanley Town and Burslem Port Vale and became a qualified referee in 1891.

== Early and personal life ==
George Shutt was born on 18 December 1861 in Fenton, Staffordshire. He was the eldest of six children to John and Sarah Ann (née Adderley); his father was a railway engine smith and writing clerk. He worked as a flower painter at a pottery and later entered the beer trade. He married Annie Hand on 6 October 1889, at St. Luke's Church, Wellington. They had one son, John Adderley (born 1890), and employed two servants. In 1891, Shutt qualified as a referee, becoming one of the youngest referees on the Football League list. He later became the proprietor of the Borough Exchange Hotel in Hanley, where he would die on 6 August 1936.

== Club career ==
=== Stoke ===
Shutt was born in Stoke-upon-Trent and played for Stoke Priory before becoming one of the first professional players signed by Stoke following their adoption of professionalism in August 1885, being paid half a crown (12 1/2p) per week. Following a threat of strike action amongst the players when the club wished to introduce different pay levels, he was given an increase to five shillings (25p). He made his league debut on 8 September 1888, at centre-half for Stoke in a 2–0 defeat by West Bromwich Albion at the Victoria Ground. He was part of a defence-line that achieved three clean-sheets whilst restricting the opposition to a single goal on four occasions. Shutt remained with Stoke until 1889 and was a member of the Stoke side that were founder members of the English Football League in 1888, finishing at the bottom of the table in the inaugural season. He played in 21 league matches for Stoke and scored once in a 1–1 draw with Aston Villa at the Victoria Ground on 3 November 1888; Shutt's goal earned Stoke their first League draw. His benefit match was played on 19 March 1888 against Mitchell St. George; Stoke won 5–1.

=== Later career ===
Following a period with Hanley Town, Shutt joined Burslem Port Vale, most likely in the summer of 1891. His first recorded game for the club was on 21 September 1891, in a 4–3 friendly win over Sheffield Wednesday at the Athletic Ground. Five days later he played in the Midland League 4–0 home defeat of Doncaster Rovers and on 3 October he played in an FA Cup first round qualifier, which Vale lost 4–2 at home to Bolton Wanderers. These were to be his only (recorded) games for the Vale, and he was released at the end of the 1892–93 season. He then returned to Hanley Town.

== Style of play ==
Shutt was described as an intelligent, sure-tackling defender.

== International career ==
Shutt earned a cap with England in 1886. The match was a Home Championship game against Ireland on 13 March. England "totally dominated the Irish" to record a 6–1 victory, with Benjamin Spilsbury scoring four goals. He also represented "The Players" against "The Gentlemen" in January and March 1886 and turned out for "The South" versus "The North" in January 1886.

== Career statistics ==
=== Club ===
Appearances and goals by club, season and competition
Club	Season	League			FA Cup		Total	
Club	Season	Division	Apps	Goals	Apps	Goals	Apps	Goals
Stoke	1883–84	–	–		1	0	1	0
Stoke	1884–85	–	–		0	0	0	0
Stoke	1885–86	–	–		2	1	2	1
Stoke	1886–87	–	–		2	0	2	0
Stoke	1887–88	–	–		4	0	4	0
Stoke	1888–89	Football League	21	1	0	0	21	1
Stoke	Total		21	1	9	1	30	2
Burslem Port Vale	1891–92	Midland League	1	0	1	0	2	0
Career total			22	1	10	1	32	2

=== International ===
National team	Year	Apps	Goals
England	1886	1	0
Total		1	0

== Honours ==
England

- British Home Championship 1885–86 (shared)
