= Jimmy Sloane =

Scottish footballer

Personal information
- Full name: James Fullarton Sloane
- Date of birth: 13 May 1866
- Place of birth: Govan, Scotland
- Date of death: 1947 (aged 80–81)
- Place of death: Glasgow, Scotland
- Position: Centre forward

Senior career*
| Years | Team | Apps | (Gls) |
| 1887 | Rangers | | |
| 1888–1889 | Stoke | 11 | (2) |
| 1889 | Rangers | | |
- * Club domestic league appearances and goals

James Fullarton Sloane (13 May 1866 – 1947) was a Scottish footballer who played in the Football League for Stoke.

== Career ==
Sloane played for Rangers before moving south of the border to Stoke where he was a member of the club's first Football League squad. He played eleven matches in that inaugural league season scoring twice before returning to Rangers.

== Career statistics ==
Appearances and goals by club, season and competition
| Club | Season | League | | | FA Cup | | Glasgow Cup | | Total | |
| Club | Season | Division | Apps | Goals | Apps | Goals | Apps | Goals | Apps | Goals |
|---|---|---|---|---|---|---|---|---|---|---|
| Rangers | 1888–89 | — | — | | 2 | 2 | 1 | 0 | 3 | 2 |
| Stoke | 1888–89 | The Football League | 11 | 2 | 0 | 0 | — | | 11 | 2 |
| Career total | | | 11 | 2 | 2 | 2 | 1 | 0 | 14 | 4 |
