= Cowan Lake Sailing Association =

Yacht club in Ohio, U.S.

Coordinates: 39°22′56.2908″N 83°54′54.252″W

- Burgee
- Short name: CLSA
- Founded: 1954; 72 years ago
- Location: Clinton County, Ohio
- Website: www.clsa.club

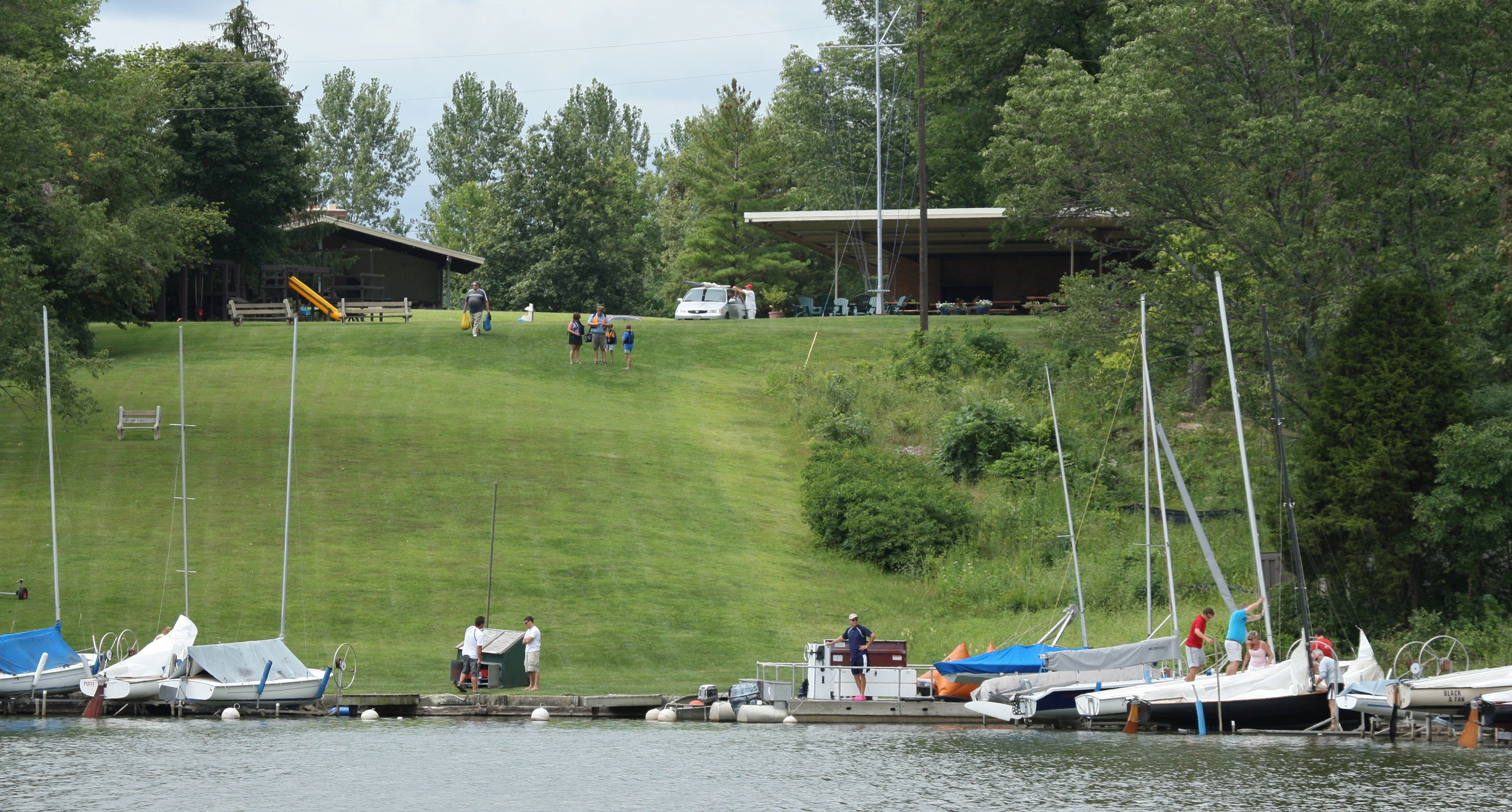
Cowan Lake Sailing Association’s clubhouse (upper right) and Shelter House (upper left) and docks.

Cowan Lake Sailing Association (CLSA) is a yacht club based at the Cowan Lake State Park in Clinton County, Ohio.

CLSA is a fully accredited member of US Sailing and the Ohio Valley Sailing Association. An important part of the club's sailing program is a junior program for youngsters aged nine to seventeen, which includes sailing and safety training in Optimist prams, Sunfish and Laser Radials over several weeks during the summer. Graduates move on to teen training in Laser, Sunfish and two and three man one design sailboats. CLSA youths are consistently in the semi-finals and even the finals in national junior competition Special programs are held during the summer at all competency levels for adult men and women. While emphasis is on sailboat racing, the club membership includes all levels of skill and interest from casual day sailors/cruisers to current and past national champions in several classes.

== History ==
In 1950, Cowan Creek was dammed, creating Cowan Lake which now has a surface area of 692 acres (2.80 km^{2}), averaging 35 feet deep. In addition to sailing, activities on the lake include fishing, canoeing, kayaking, and swimming. A group of sailors formed the club in 1954 for the purpose of holding regattas and promoting sailing. According to its constitution, the club's purpose is "to obtain, develop, and maintain adequate sailing facilities and accommodations at and upon Cowan Lake; to cooperate and counsel with the duly constituted authorities of the State of Ohio concerning the furtherance of the objects and interests of the Association and the betterment of Cowan Lake and its environs; to promote the sport of sailing, and to foster and emphasize a spirit of mutual helpfulness and courteous consideration among the members of the Association."

James Van Vost served as the club's first commodore. The club is administered by a 12-person Board of Governors that includes the Commodore, Vice-Commodore, Secretary, Treasurer, two past Commodores, and six members. The club's Permanent Race Committee consists of eighteen members. Today, the club has about 130 member families and over 250 boats owned by the membership.

== Fleets ==
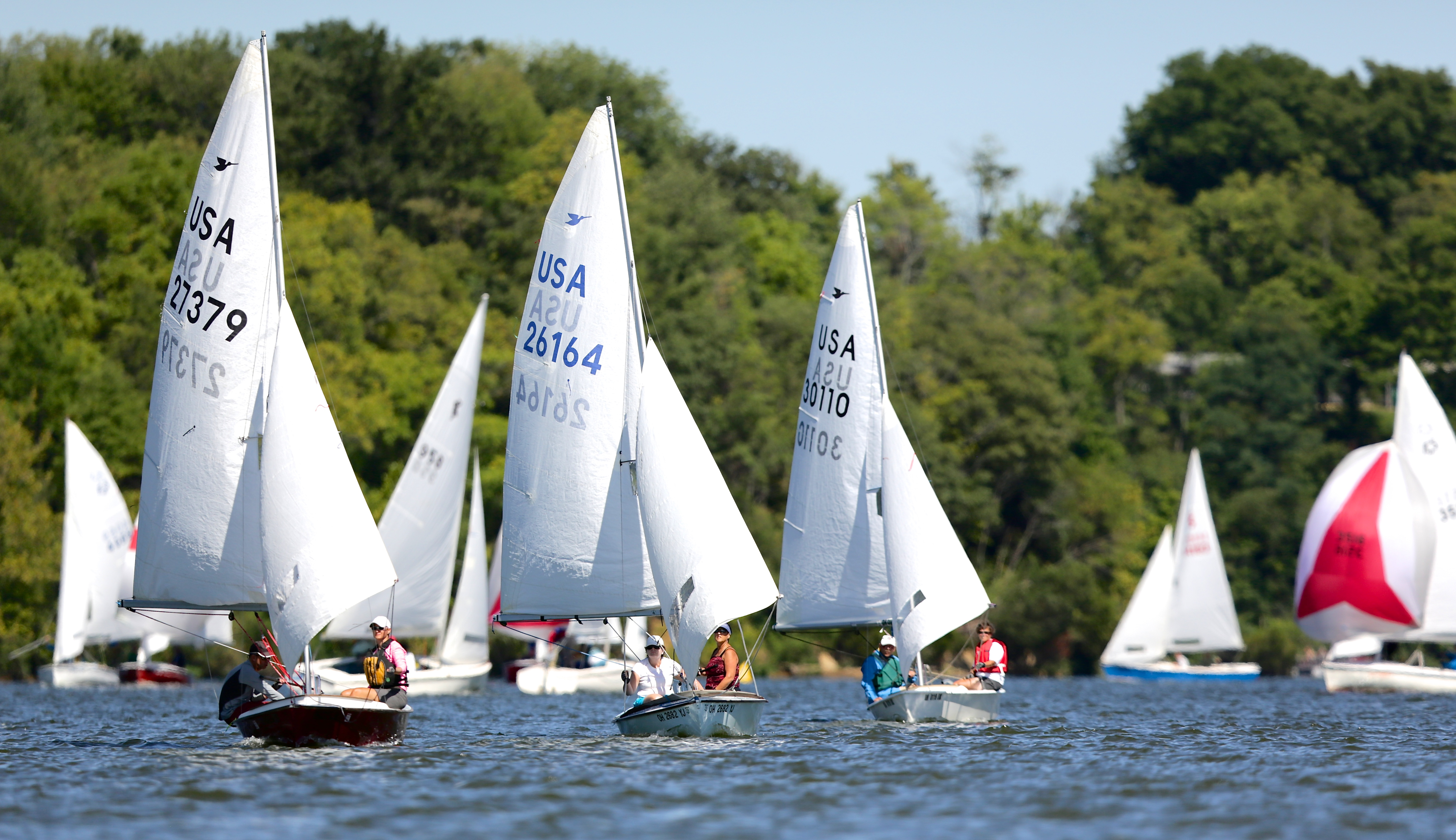
Members of CLSA Snipe fleet race downwind during a typical Sunday club race on Cowan Lake.

The club is primarily devoted to one-design racing in the following classes:

- Flying Scot
- Thistle
- Highlander
- Lightning
- MC Scow
- Snipe
- 420
- Laser
- Optimist

During the sailing season of April through October, CLSA runs 65 scheduled races on Sundays and national holidays plus approximately 30 special events and regattas. Regattas include the Annual Flying Scot Pig Roast Regatta. The club also fields a cruising fleet as well that includes the following classes: Capril 16.5, Force 5, Harpoon 5.2, Hobie 16, Luders 21, Vanguard 15, and Y Flyer.

== Facilities ==
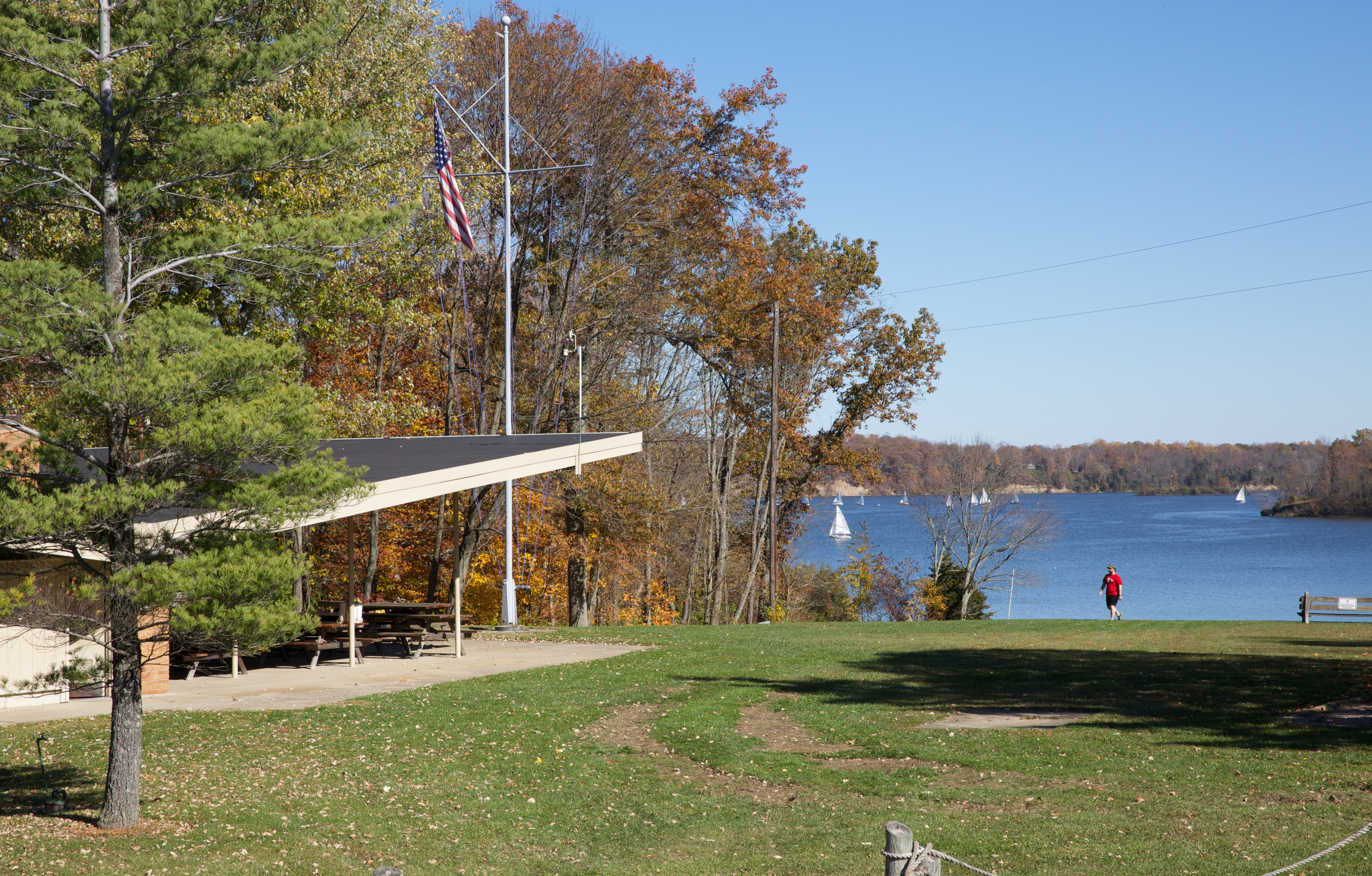
The clubhouse overlooks Cowan Lake.

The club's facilities include eight acres owned by the membership overlooking the lake with a main clubhouse and a separate camping shelter house, camp grounds, boat and trailer storage area, parking, full kitchen and bathroom facilities with hot showers. In addition to 138 regular docks (most equipped with member-owned boat lifts), the membership, along with the state, has built two extensive rack and dock facilities for board boats and junior sailing prams. The membership owns six power vessels, including a race committee boat and a specialized rescue boat capable of rescuing and pumping out swamped craft.
