= Albert Farmer =

English footballer

Personal information
- Full name: Albert Farmer
- Date of birth: 1864
- Place of birth: Stoke-upon-Trent, England
- Position: Half back

Senior career*
Years	Team	Apps	(Gls)
- Everton
1888–1890	Stoke	3	(0)
- * Club domestic league appearances and goals

Albert Farmer (born 1864) was an English footballer who played in the Football League for Stoke.

== Career ==
Farmer was born in Stoke-upon-Trent but started his career with Everton. He moved back home just before the start of the Football League and signed for his hometown club Stoke but only played once during the 1888–89 season in a FA Cup defeat to Warwick County. He managed three league appearances the following season before leaving the club in February 1890.

== Career statistics ==
Club	Season	League			FA Cup		Total	
Club	Season	Division	Apps	Goals	Apps	Goals	Apps	Goals
Stoke	1888–89	The Football League	0	0	1	0	1	0
Stoke	1889–90	The Football League	3	0	2	0	5	0
Career total			3	0	3	0	6	0
