= Elijah Smith (footballer) =

English footballer

Personal information
- Full name: Elijah Smith
- Date of birth: 1860
- Place of birth: Stoke-upon-Trent, England
- Date of death: circa 1935
- Position: Half back

Senior career*
| Years | Team | Apps | (Gls) |
| 1882–1883 | Tunstall | | |
| 1883–1890 | Stoke | 25 | (0) |
| 1890 | Stafford Road | | |
- * Club domestic league appearances and goals

Elijah Smith (1860 – circa 1935) was an English footballer who played for in the Football League for Stoke.

== Career ==
Smith played for local side Tunstall before joining Stoke in 1883. Smith combined being a footballer with his work as a vicar at the local church because of this he was known as 'Father Smith' to his Stoke teammates. He played in the club's first competitive match in the FA Cup against Manchester in a 2–1 defeat. Smith was a member of Stoke team which competed in the first season of the Football League. He made his league debut on 8 September 1888, at wing-half for Stoke in a 2–0 defeat by West Bromwich Albion at the Victoria Ground. Smith made 21 League appearances (out of 22) in the 1888–89 season as Stoke finished bottom of the table. He played a further four matches for Stoke before leaving in 1890 and he joined Wolverhampton based Stafford Road.

== Career statistics ==
| Club | Season | League | | | FA Cup | | Total | |
| Club | Season | Division | Apps | Goals | Apps | Goals | Apps | Goals |
|---|---|---|---|---|---|---|---|---|
| Stoke | 1883–84 | — | — | | 1 | 0 | 1 | 0 |
| Stoke | 1884–85 | — | — | | 0 | 0 | 0 | 0 |
| Stoke | 1885–86 | — | — | | 2 | 0 | 2 | 0 |
| Stoke | 1886–87 | — | — | | 1 | 0 | 1 | 0 |
| Stoke | 1887–88 | — | — | | 4 | 0 | 4 | 0 |
| Stoke | 1888–89 | The Football League | 21 | 0 | 0 | 0 | 21 | 0 |
| Stoke | 1889–90 | The Football League | 4 | 0 | 0 | 0 | 4 | 0 |
| Career total | | | 25 | 0 | 8 | 0 | 33 | 0 |
