= Percy Birch =

English footballer

Personal information
- Full name: Percy Birch
- Date of birth: 1860
- Place of birth: Stoke-upon-Trent, England
- Position: Goalkeeper

Senior career*
Years	Team	Apps	(Gls)
- Stoke Priory
1883–1885	Stoke		
- Cobridge
- * Club domestic league appearances and goals

Percy Birch (1860 – unknown) was an English footballer who played for Stoke.

== Career ==
Birch played for Stoke Priory before joining Stoke in 1883. He played in the club's first competitive match in the FA Cup against Manchester where he kept goal in a 2–1 defeat. He stayed at Stoke until the end of the 1885–86 season where he played in two more FA Cup matches. He later went on to play for Cobridge.

== Career statistics ==
Appearances and goals by club, season and competition
Club	Season	FA Cup		Total	
Club	Season	Apps	Goals	Apps	Goals
Stoke	1883–84	1	0	1	0
Stoke	1884–85	0	0	0	0
Stoke	1885–86	2	0	2	0
Career total		3	0	3	0
