= Thomas Wainwright =

Thomas Wainwright may refer to:

- Tom Wainwright (1860–1940), English football inside-forward
- Thomas Wainwright (footballer, born 1876) (1876–1949), English football half-back
- Thomas Wainwright (cricketer) (1940–2019), English cricketer

== See also ==
- Thomas Wainewright (1974–1847), English artist, author and suspected serial killer
