= 1888–89 Stoke F.C. season =

Stoke
1888–89 season
- Chairman: Mr S.Barker
- Manager: Harry Lockett
- Stadium: Victoria Ground
- Football League: 12th (12 Points)
- FA Cup: First Qualifying Round
- Top goalscorer: League: Bob McSkimming (6); All: Bob McSkimming (6)
- Highest home attendance: 5,000 vs Blackburn Rovers (1 December 1888)
- Lowest home attendance: 1,500 vs Everton (15 December 1888)
- Average home league attendance: 3,450
Home colours

The 1888–89 season was Stoke's first season in the Football League, Stoke becoming one of the 12 founder members.

There was a major change to English football in 1888–89 following the formation of the Football League. Stoke successfully joined the league along with 11 other professional football clubs. Managed by Harry Lockett Stoke struggled throughout the season and ended up finishing bottom of the table after managing just four victories.

== Season review ==
=== League ===
Prior to the 1888–89 season clubs played in friendlies, Staffordshire Senior Cup and in the FA Cup which Stoke entered for the first time in 1883. However once a team has been knocked out of the cup there was little excitement for players and supporters and so a league format was advocated by the chairman of Aston Villa, William McGregor and in the spring of 1888 the Football League was formed with McGregor as its first president. Harry Lockett represented Stoke at the meeting in Anderton's Hall Hotel, London and was successful as three weeks later Stoke joined the league and Lockett was appointed as the league's first secretary which he went on to occupy from 1888 to 1902. Stoke's first league match was at the Victoria Ground against midlands rivals and FA Cup holders West Bromwich Albion. A crowd in excess of 4,500 attended the contest which was won 2–0 by the visitors thanks to late goals from Joe Wilson and George Woodhall which meant that the "Baggies" were the first side to be top of the table.

Stoke had the misfortune to finish bottom of the table, albeit on goal-average at the end of the first league season after only winning 4 of their 22 matches. These were 3–0 both home and away over Notts County the team who finished level on points with Stoke, 4–3 v Burnley and 2–1 against Blackburn Rovers. Frank Staton had the honour of scoring the club's first league goal which came in a 5–1 loss at Aston Villa. Stoke's first win was against Notts County on 22 September with two goals from Billy Tunncliffe and a strike from the clubs first Scottish player Bob McSkimming who went on be the leading goalscorer with six. Stoke's heaviest defeat was a 7–0 loss away at the eventual winners of both League and cup Preston North End. Two Stoke players failed to board the train on the morning of that game at Deepdale and so Preston agreed to loan two of their reserves (Bill Smalley and Alfred Dempsey) to make up the numbers. Alf Underwood and Bob McSkimming were Stoke's only ever-presents and Bill Rowley only missed one game. Stoke successfully applied for re-election to along with Burnley, Derby County and Notts County.

=== FA Cup ===
On the same day as the first qualifying round Stoke's first team had an away match against Preston North End so Stoke's reserve side, the Stoke Swifts played the FA Cup tie against Warwick County which they lost 2–1.

== Final league table ==
Pos	Team	Pld	W	D	L	GF	GA	GAv	Pts	Qualification
8	Everton	22	9	2	11	35	47	0.745	20	
9	Burnley	22	7	3	12	42	62	0.677	17	Re-elected
10	Derby County	22	7	2	13	41	61	0.672	16	Re-elected
11	Notts County	22	5	2	15	40	73	0.548	12	Re-elected
12	Stoke	22	4	4	14	26	51	0.510	12	Re-elected

Source: World Football
Rules for classification: 1) Points; 2) Goal average; 3) Goals scored

== Results ==
Stoke's score comes first

=== Legend ===
Win	Draw	Loss

=== Football League ===
Match	Date	Opponent	Venue	Result	Attendance	Scorers
1	8 September 1888	West Bromwich Albion	H	0–2	4,524	
2	15 September 1888	Aston Villa	A	1–5	3,000	Staton
3	22 September 1888	Notts County	H	3–0	3,000	Tunnicliffe (2), McSkimming
4	29 September 1888	Accrington	H	2–4	5,000	Staton, McSkimming
5	6 October 1888	Preston North End	A	0–7	3,500	
6	13 October 1888	Bolton Wanderers	A	1–2	3,000	Slater
7	20 October 1888	Burnley	H	4–3	4,500	Sloane, Tunnicliffe (2), Lawton
8	27 October 1888	Blackburn Rovers	A	2–5	3,000	McSkimming (2)
9	3 November 1888	Aston Villa	H	1–1	4,000	Shutt
10	12 November 1888	Preston North End	H	0–3	4,500	
11	17 November 1888	Wolverhampton Wanderers	H	0–1	2,500	
12	24 November 1888	Notts County	A	3–0	2,500	McSkimming, Milarvie (2)
13	1 December 1888	Blackburn Rovers	H	2–1	5,000	McSkimming, Edge
14	8 December 1888	Burnley	A	1–2	3,000	Edge
15	15 December 1888	Everton	H	0–0	1,500	
16	22 December 1888	Wolverhampton Wanderers	A	1–4	2,500	Sloane
17	29 December 1888	West Bromwich Albion	A	0–2	4,900	
18	12 January 1889	Everton	A	1–2	7,000	Milarvie
19	19 January 1889	Bolton Wanderers	H	2–2	4,000	Milarvie (2)
20	26 January 1889	Derby County	A	1–2	3,000	Edge
21	6 April 1889	Derby County	H	1–1	4,000	Sayer
22	20 April 1889	Accrington	A	0–2	2,000	

=== FA Cup ===
Round	Date	Opponent	Venue	Result	Attendance	Scorers
QR1	6 October 1888	Warwick County	H	1–2	1,500	Wainwright

== Squad statistics ==
Pos.	Name	League		FA Cup		Total	
Pos.	Name	Apps	Goals	Apps	Goals	Apps	Goals
GK	(England) Charlie Hassall	0	0	1	0	1	0
GK	(England) Wilf Merritt	1	0	0	0	1	0
GK	(England) Bill Rowley	21	0	0	0	21	0
FB	(England) George Bateman	0	0	0	0	0	0
FB	(England) Albert Bourne	0	0	1	0	1	0
FB	(England) Tommy Clare	21	0	0	0	21	0
FB	(Wales) Edgar Montford	0	0	1	0	1	0
FB	(England) Alf Underwood	22	0	0	0	22	0
HB	(England) Albert Farmer	0	0	1	0	1	0
HB	(Scotland) Billy Hendry	2	0	0	0	2	0
HB	(England) Will Holford	0	0	1	0	1	0
HB	(England) Bob Ramsay	21	0	0	0	21	0
HB	(England) George Shutt	21	1	0	0	21	1
HB	(England) Elijah Smith	21	0	0	0	21	0
FW	(England) Charlie Baker	1	0	0	0	1	0
FW	(Scotland) Bob Barr	3	0	0	0	3	0
FW	(England) Alfred Dempsey	1	0	0	0	1	0
FW	(England) Alf Edge	19	3	1	0	20	3
FW	(England) Tom Forrester	0	0	1	0	1	0
FW	(England) Freddie Gee	1	0	0	0	1	0
FW	(England) Billy Hutchinson	1	0	0	0	1	0
FW	(England) George Lawton	13	1	0	0	13	1
FW	(Scotland) Bob McSkimming	22	6	0	0	22	6
FW	(Scotland) Bob Milarvie	15	5	0	0	15	5
FW	(England) Harry Montford	1	0	1	0	2	0
FW	(Scotland) Thomas Moore	1	0	0	0	1	0
FW	(England) Jimmy Sayer	7	1	1	0	8	1
FW	(England) George Slater	2	1	0	0	2	1
FW	(Scotland) Jimmy Sloane	11	2	0	0	11	2
FW	(England) Bill Smalley	1	0	0	0	1	0
FW	(England) Frank Staton	4	2	0	0	4	2
FW	(England) Billy Tunnicliffe	8	4	1	0	9	4
FW	(England) Tom Wainwright	1	0	1	1	2	1
