= Horace Brown (footballer) =

English footballer

Personal information
- Date of birth: 1860
- Place of birth: Stoke-upon-Trent, England
- Position: Half-back

Senior career*
Years	Team	Apps	(Gls)
1883–1886	Stoke		
- Stoke St Peter's
- * Club domestic league appearances and goals

Horace R. Brown (born 1860) was an English footballer who played for Stoke.

== Career ==
Brown was born in Stoke-upon-Trent and played for Stoke in their first competitive match in the FA Cup against Manchester in a 2–1 defeat. He stayed at Stoke until the end of the 1886–87 season where he played in three more FA Cup matches He later went on to play for Stoke St Peter's.

== Career statistics ==
Appearances and goals by club, season and competition
Club	Season	FA Cup		Total	
Club	Season	Apps	Goals	Apps	Goals
Stoke	1883–84	1	0	1	0
Stoke	1884–85	0	0	0	0
Stoke	1885–86	2	0	2	0
Stoke	1886–87	1	0	1	0
Career total		4	0	4	0
