= Albert Bourne =

English footballer

Personal information
- Full name: Albert Bourne
- Date of birth: 1863
- Place of birth: Stoke-upon-Trent, England
- Date of death: 1930 (aged 66–67)
- Position: Full back

Senior career*
Years	Team	Apps	(Gls)
1888–1889	Stoke	0	(0)
1889	Tunstall Rovers		
- * Club domestic league appearances and goals

Albert Bourne (1863–1930) was an English footballer who played for Stoke.

== Career ==
Bourne played in the local church league before joining Stoke in 1888. He was a member of Stoke's reserve side the 'Swifts' and was overlooked by manager Harry Lockett for the first team. His only senior appearance came in the FA Cup against Warwick County. Stoke lost and most of the reserve players including Bourne were released. He later went on to play for Tunstall Rovers.

== Career statistics ==
Club	Season	League			FA Cup		Total	
Club	Season	Division	Apps	Goals	Apps	Goals	Apps	Goals
Stoke	1888–89	The Football League	0	0	1	0	1	0
Career total			0	0	1	0	1	0
