= Richard Chadwick =

Richard Chadwick may refer to:

- Richard Chadwick, drummer with Hawkwind
- Richard Chadwick (footballer) (1860–?), English footballer who played for Stoke
