= Will Holford =

English footballer

Personal information
- Full name: William Holford
- Date of birth: 1862
- Place of birth: Stoke-upon-Trent, England
- Date of death: 1907 (aged 45)
- Position: Half back

Senior career*
Years	Team	Apps	(Gls)
- Boothen Victoria
1886–1889	Stoke	0	(0)
- * Club domestic league appearances and goals

William Holford (1862–1907) was an English footballer who played for Stoke.

== Career ==
Holford was born in Stoke-upon-Trent and played for Boothen Victoria before joining the local professional team Stoke in 1886. He played in four matches in the FA Cup in three seasons with the club but was overlooked by manager Harry Lockett for the Football League squad and left the club in 1889.

== Career statistics ==
Appearances and goals by club, season and competition
Club	Season	League			FA Cup		Total	
Club	Season	Division	Apps	Goals	Apps	Goals	Apps	Goals
Stoke	1886–87	—	–		1	0	1	0
Stoke	1887–88	—	–		2	0	2	0
Stoke	1888–89	The Football League	0	0	1	0	1	0
Career Total			0	0	4	0	4	0
