= 1887–88 Stoke F.C. season =

Stoke
1887–88 season
- Manager: Harry Lockett
- Stadium: Victoria Ground
- FA Cup: Fifth Round
Home colours

The 1887–88 season was the fifth season Stoke took part in the FA Cup.

== Season review ==
In the 1887–88 FA Cup Stoke advanced past local rivals Burslem Port Vale whom they beat 1–0 with a goal from George Lawton, Over Wanderers, Oswestry Town plus a fourth round Bye before losing 4–1 to West Bromwich Albion.

== FA Cup ==
Round	Date	Opponent	Venue	Result	Attendance	Scorers
R1	5 October 1887	Burslem Port Vale	H	1–0	3,000	Lawton
R2	5 November 1887	Over Wanderers	A	3–0	3,000	Lawton, Edge, Owen
R3	26 November 1887	Oswestry Town	H	3–0	3,000	Ballham, Edge, Owen
R4	Stoke received a Bye					
R5	7 January 1888	West Bromwich Albion	A	1–4	3,000	Owen

=== Squad statistics ===
Pos.	Name	FA Cup	
Pos.	Name	Apps	Goals
GK	(England) Bill Rowley	4	0
FB	(England) Tommy Clare	4	0
FB	(England) Alf Underwood	4	0
HB	(England) Joe Broadhurst	1	0
HB	(England) Will Holford	2	0
HB	(England) Stan Meakin	1	0
HB	(England) George Shutt	4	0
HB	(England) Elijah Smith	4	0
FW	(England) Lewis Ballham	4	1
FW	(England) Alf Edge	4	2
FW	(England) George Lawton	4	2
FW	(England) Doug Millward	1	0
FW	(England) Wally Owen	4	3
FW	(England) Jimmy Sayer	3	0
