= George Farmer (English footballer) =

English footballer

Personal information
- Full name: George Farmer
- Date of birth: 1862
- Place of birth: Stoke-upon-Trent, England
- Position: Half back

Senior career*
Years	Team	Apps	(Gls)
- Tunstall
1886–1887	Stoke		
- Burslem Swifts
- * Club domestic league appearances and goals

George Farmer (born 1862) was an English footballer who played for Stoke.

== Career ==
Farmer was born in Stoke-upon-Trent and played football with Tunstall before joining Stoke in 1886. He played once in FA Cup in the 1886–87 season which came in a 6–4 defeat to Crewe Alexandra. He left Stoke at the end of the season and later joined Burslem Swifts.

== Career statistics ==
Appearances and goals by club, season and competition
Club	Season	FA Cup		Total	
Club	Season	Apps	Goals	Apps	Goals
Stoke	1886–87	1	0	1	0
Career total		1	0	1	0
