= William Rose (footballer) =

English footballer

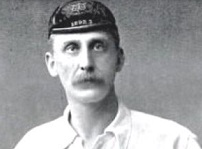

Personal information
- Full name: William Crisp Rose
- Date of birth: 1 December 1861
- Place of birth: Euston, Middlesex, England
- Date of death: 2 February 1937 (aged 75)
- Place of death: Birmingham, England
- Height: 5 ft 11 1/2 in (1.82 m)
- Position: Goalkeeper

Senior career*
| Years | Team | Apps | (Gls) |
| 1877–1882 | Small Heath | | |
| 1882–1884 | Swindon Town | | |
| 1884 | Swifts | | |
| 1884–1885 | Swindon Victoria | | |
| 1885 | Corinthian | | |
| 1885–1888 | Preston North End | | |
| 1888 | Warwick County | | |
| 1888–1894 | Wolverhampton Wanderers | | |
| 1894–1895 | Loughborough Town | | |
| 1895–1896 | Wolverhampton Wanderers | | |

International career
| 1884–1891 | England | 5 | (0) |
- * Club domestic league appearances and goals

William Crisp Rose (1 December 1861 – 2 February 1937) was an English international footballer who played as a goalkeeper.

== Early and personal life ==
Born in Euston, Middlesex, Rose was the eldest of three sons; their father was a carpenter, a trade which Rose also later practiced. The family later moved to Aston in Birmingham. He married in August 1886; his wife died by the end of the year. He had a second marriage in September 1896, and four children.

== Career ==
Rose began his career with Small Heath, Swindon Town, Swifts, Swindon Victoria, Corinthian, Preston North End, Warwick County, Wolverhampton Wanderers and Loughborough Town. He won the FA Cup once and was runner-up twice.

He earned five caps for England between 1884 and 1891.

== Later life and death ==
By 1891 he was the hotel manager of a pub in Wolverhampton, where his younger brother was a barman. By 1901 he was a 'beerhouse keeper' in Crewe, and by 1911 he was the manager of a pub in Birmingham. He also worked as a tobacconist in Bordesley.

He slipped outside of a shop and died on 2 February 1937, age 75.
