= Billy Hutchinson (footballer, born 1870) =

English footballer

Personal information
- Full name: William Hutchinson
- Date of birth: July 1870
- Place of birth: Stoke-upon-Trent, England
- Date of death: July 1943 (aged 73)
- Place of death: Stoke-on-Trent, England
- Position: Right winger

Senior career*
Years	Team	Apps	(Gls)
1887	Fenton Red Star		
1888–1889	Stoke	1	(0)
1890	Long Eaton Rangers		
- * Club domestic league appearances and goals

William Hutchinson (July 1870 – July 1943) was an English footballer who played in the Football League for Stoke.

== Career ==
Hutchinson was born in Stoke-upon-Trent and played for Fenton Red Star before joining Stoke in 1888. He made just one appearance for Stoke in the Football League which came in a 2–1 defeat away at Derby County in January 1889. He joined Football Alliance side Long Eaton Rangers at the end of the season.

== Career statistics ==
Club	Season	League			FA Cup		Total	
Club	Season	Division	Apps	Goals	Apps	Goals	Apps	Goals
Stoke	1888–89	The Football League	1	0	0	0	1	0
Career total			1	0	0	0	1	0
