= Bob McSkimming =

Scottish footballer

Personal information
- Full name: Robert McSkimming
- Date of birth: 1864
- Place of birth: Kilmarnock, Scotland
- Date of death: 4 July 1924 (aged 58–59)
- Place of death: Kilmarnock, Scotland
- Position: Forward

Senior career*
Years	Team	Apps	(Gls)
- Kilmarnock
1887–1888	Hurlford		
1888–1889	Stoke	22	(6)
1889–1891	Burslem Port Vale	0	(0)
- Stone Town
- * Club domestic league appearances and goals

Robert McSkimming (1864 – 4 July 1924) was a Scottish footballer who played in the English Football League for Stoke.

== Career ==
McSkimming played for Kilmarnock and Hurlford before moving down to England with Stoke in time for the first season of the Football League, becoming the first Scottish footballer to sign for Stoke. He made his League debut on 8 September 1888, as a forward for Stoke in a 2–0 defeat by West Bromwich Albion at the Victoria Ground. He was top scorer in the 1888–89 season with six as Stoke endured a poor start to league football finishing bottom of the table. McSkimming was one of two Stoke players (the other was Alf Underwood) to play in all 22 League games in the 1888–89 season. As a forward he played in a front-line that scored three League goals or more on three separate occasions. He found the net in three of the club's four league wins; his goals at the Victoria Ground came against Notts County (his debut League goal scored on 22 September 1888, Stoke won 3–0), Accrington, Blackburn Rovers, and away from home in the return fixtures with Notts County and Blackburn (2).

He joined nearby Burslem Port Vale in the summer of 1889. His appearances were mostly limited to friendlies, his business commitments helping to restrict his playing opportunities. He was released, most likely in 1891 and later played for Stone Town.

== Style of play ==
One source describes McSkimming as "a fine sprinter, he competed at various Scottish athletic meetings, collecting a handful of medals.

== Career statistics ==
Appearances and goals by club, season and competition
Club	Season	League			FA Cup		Total	
Club	Season	Division	Apps	Goals	Apps	Goals	Apps	Goals
Stoke	1888–89	The Football League	22	6	0	0	22	6
Career total			22	6	0	0	22	6
