= Fred Bettany =

English footballer (1860–1924)

Personal information
- Full name: Frederick Bettany
- Date of birth: 1860
- Place of birth: Burslem, England
- Date of death: 9 June 1924 (aged 63–64)
- Place of death: Burslem, Stoke-on-Trent, England
- Position: Half-back

Youth career
- Burslem St. Paul's
- Burslem

Senior career*
Years	Team	Apps	(Gls)
1885–1886	Stoke		
1886–1888	Burslem Port Vale	0	(0)
Total		0	(0)
- * Club domestic league appearances and goals

Frederick Bettany (1860 – 9 June 1924) was an English footballer who played for Burslem Port Vale and Stoke.

== Career ==
Bettany played for Burslem St. Paul's and Burslem before joining Stoke in 1885. He played in both FA Cup matches in the 1885–86 season as Stoke lost to Crewe Alexandra in a replay. Stoke released him at the end of the season. He played for Burslem Port Vale at right-half in a 1–1 home draw with Great Lever in a friendly match on 11 April 1885. He joined the club permanently in March 1886 and played regular football, helping them reach the FA Cup third round in 1887. He served as the club's secretary between July and November 1886 but was released as a player, most likely in 1888. He scored one goal in 17 games over all competitions for the club.

== Career statistics ==
Appearances and goals by club, season and competition
Club	Season	FA Cup		Total	
Club	Season	Apps	Goals	Apps	Goals
Stoke	1885–86	2	0	2	0
Career total		2	0	2	0
