= George Slater =

English footballer

Personal information
- Full name: George Slater
- Date of birth: 1864
- Place of birth: Walsall, England
- Place of death: USA
- Position: Right winger

Senior career*
Years	Team	Apps	(Gls)
1887	Hanley United		
1888	Stoke	2	(1)
- * Club domestic league appearances and goals

George Slater (born 1864) was an English footballer who played in the Football League for Stoke.

== Career ==
Slater played for Hanley United and joined Stoke in 1888. Slater, playing as a forward, made his Stoke and League debut on 6 October 1888 at Deepdale, the home of Preston North End. The visitors were overwhelmed and lost 7–0 to the eventual League Champions. Slater scored his debut and League goal on 13 October 1888 at Pike's Lane, the then home of Bolton Wanderers. With ten minutes to go Stoke were trailing 1–0 but Slater put Stoke level at 1–1 but a late Bolton goal saw Stoke lose 2–1.

He left Stoke in October 1888 when he decided to emigrate to the United States where he lived out the rest of his life.

== Career statistics ==
Club	Season	League			FA Cup		Total	
Club	Season	Division	Apps	Goals	Apps	Goals	Apps	Goals
Stoke	1888–89	The Football League	2	1	0	0	2	1
Career Total			2	1	0	0	2	1
