= Doug Millward (footballer, born 1862) =

English footballer

Personal information
- Full name: Douglas Millward
- Date of birth: 1862
- Place of birth: Stoke-upon-Trent, England
- Position: Forward

Senior career*
| Years | Team | Apps | (Gls) |
- Stoke Priory
| 1887–1888 | Stoke | | |
- Leek
- * Club domestic league appearances and goals

Douglas Millward (1862 – after 1888) was an English footballer who played for Stoke.

== Career ==
Millward played for local side Stoke Priory before joining Stoke in 1887. He played once for Stoke in the FA Cup during the 1887–88 season which came in a 4–1 defeat to West Bromwich Albion. He left the club at the end of the season and went on to play for Leek.

== Career statistics ==
Appearances and goals by club, season and competition
| Club | Season | FA Cup | | Total | |
| Club | Season | Apps | Goals | Apps | Goals |
|---|---|---|---|---|---|
| Stoke | 1887–88 | 1 | 0 | 1 | 0 |
| Career total | | 1 | 0 | 1 | 0 |
