= 1886–87 Stoke F.C. season =

Stoke
1886–87 season
- Manager: Harry Lockett
- Stadium: Victoria Ground
- FA Cup: Second Round
Home colours

The 1886–87 season was the fourth season Stoke took part the FA Cup. They were eliminated in the second round.

== Season review ==
Stoke's first FA Cup win finally arrived on 30 October 1886, when Welsh side Caernarfon Wanderers came to the Victoria Ground and were well beaten 10–1. But joy was short-lived as Crewe Alexandra again knocked Stoke out this time 6–4.

== FA Cup ==
Round	Date	Opponent	Venue	Result	Attendance	Scorers
R1	30 October 1886	Caernarfon Wanderers	H	10–1	5,000	Bennett (3), Edge (5), Clare (2)
R2	11 November 1886	Crewe Alexandra	A	4–6	3,500	Edge, Owen, Bennett, Conde (o.g.)

=== Squad statistics ===
Pos.	Name	FA Cup	
Pos.	Name	Apps	Goals
GK	(England) Arthur Broomhall	1	0
GK	(England) Bill Rowley	1	0
FB	(England) Horace Brown	1	0
FB	(England) Tommy Clare	2	2
FB	(England) Elijah Smith	1	0
HB	(England) George Bateman	1	0
HB	(England) Richard Chadwick	1	0
HB	(England) Will Holford	1	0
HB	(England) George Shutt	2	0
FW	(England) Lewis Ballham	2	0
FW	(England) Teddy Bennett	2	4
FW	(England) Alf Edge	2	6
FW	(England) George Farmer	1	0
FW	(England) Wally Owen	2	1
FW	(England) Jimmy Sayer	2	0
–	Own goals	–	1
