= Frank Staton =

English footballer

Personal information
- Full name: Frank Edgar Staton
- Date of birth: 1864
- Place of birth: Stoke-upon-Trent, England
- Date of death: before 1945
- Position: Forward

Senior career*
Years	Team	Apps	(Gls)
1887	Goldenhill Wanderers		
1888–1889	Stoke	4	(2)
1889	Stafford Road		
- * Club domestic league appearances and goals

Frank Edgar Staton (1864 – before 1945) was an English footballer who played in the Football League for Stoke.

== Career ==
Staton was born in Stoke-upon-Trent and played for local side Goldenhill Wanderers before joining Stoke at the start of the first season of the Football League. He made his league debut on 8 September 1888, as a forward for Stoke in a 2–0 defeat by West Bromwich Albion at the Victoria Ground. Staton scored Stoke's first ever league goal in a 5–1 defeat to Aston Villa on 15 September 1888 played at Wellington Road. He scored again two weeks later against Accrington at Victoria Ground on 29 September 1888. In 1889, he decided to move to the Wolverhampton-based club Stafford Road.

== Career statistics ==
Appearances and goals by club, season and competition
Club	Season	League			FA Cup		Total	
Club	Season	Division	Apps	Goals	Apps	Goals	Apps	Goals
Stoke	1888–89	The Football League	4	2	0	0	4	2
Career total			4	2	0	0	4	2
