= Bob Barr (footballer, born 1865) =

Scottish footballer

Personal information
- Full name: Robert Barr
- Date of birth: April 1865
- Place of birth: Kilmarnock, Scotland
- Date of death: 1935 (aged 69–70)
- Place of death: Scotland
- Position: Centre forward

Senior career*
Years	Team	Apps	(Gls)
1887	Hurlford United		
1888–1889	Stoke	3	(0)
1889–1894	Abercorn	24	(14)
1894–1895	Preston North End	29	(9)
1895–1896	Bury	15	(6)
1896	Reading		
1897	Abercorn	1	(0)
1900	Albion Rovers		
1901	Barrow		
Total		72	(29)
- * Club domestic league appearances and goals

Robert Barr (1865–1935) was a Scottish footballer who played in the Football League for Bury, Preston North End and Stoke.

== Career ==
Barr started his career with Hurlford United before moving south of the border to Stoke in 1888 in time for the first season of the Football League. Barr played three matches for Stoke before returning to Scotland with Abercorn where he would spend the next five years. He re-entered English football again in 1894 with Preston North End and then with Bury a year later.

== Career statistics ==
Club	Season	League			FA Cup		Total	
Club	Season	Division	Apps	Goals	Apps	Goals	Apps	Goals
Stoke	1888–89	The Football League	3	0	0	0	3	0
Preston North End	1894–95	First Division	28	9	2	0	30	9
Preston North End	1895–96	First Division	1	0	0	0	1	0
Bury	1895–96	First Division	15	6	3	1	18	7
Career total			47	15	5	1	52	16
