= Alfred Dempsey =

English footballer

Personal information
- Full name: Alfred Dempsey
- Date of birth: 8 June 1865
- Place of birth: Blackburn, England
- Date of death: 1950 (aged 85)
- Position: Forward

Senior career*
Years	Team	Apps	(Gls)
1888–1889	Preston North End	0	(0)
1888	→ Stoke (loan)	1	(0)
- * Club domestic league appearances and goals

Alfred Dempsey (8 June 1865 – 1950) was an English footballer who played in the Football League for Stoke.

== Career ==
In a Football League match between Preston North End and Stoke in October 1888, two Stoke players did not arrive at the ground and Preston reserve player, Dempsey and Bill Smalley were borrowed from the home side. They did not help Stoke though as North End ran out 7–0 winners.

== Career statistics ==
Appearances and goals by club, season and competition
Club	Season	League			FA Cup		Total	
Club	Season	Division	Apps	Goals	Apps	Goals	Apps	Goals
Preston North End	1888–89	The Football League	0	0	0	0	0	0
Stoke (loan)	1888–89	The Football League	1	0	0	0	1	0
Career Total			1	0	0	0	1	0
