= George Lawton (footballer, born 1862) =

English footballer

Personal information
- Full name: George Lawton
- Date of birth: 4 August 1862
- Place of birth: Stoke-upon-Trent, England
- Date of death: 1930 (aged 67–68)
- Place of death: Stoke-on-Trent, England
- Position: Right winger

Senior career*
Years	Team	Apps	(Gls)
1884–1885	Stoke St Peter's		
1885–1886	Stoke	0	(0)
1886	Burslem Port Vale	0	(0)
1886–1889	Stoke	13	(1)
1889–1890	Altrincham		
1890–1891	Belvedere F.C.		
- * Club domestic league appearances and goals

George Lawton (4 August 1862 – 1930) was an English footballer who played in the Football League for Stoke.

== Career ==
George Lawton joined Stoke St Peter's in 1884. In July 1885, he signed for Stoke, playing in both FA Cup matches in the 1885–86 season as Stoke lost to Crewe Alexandra in a replay. In January 1886, he joined nearby Burslem Port Vale, where he scored three times in 13 friendlies, before returning to Stoke in the May of that year. Stoke's major achievement from 1886 to 1888 was reaching the 1887–88 FA Cup fifth round. The tie was played on 7 January 1888 at Stoney Lane, the then home of West Bromwich Albion. Stoke lost 4–1. Lawton played in all four FA Cup ties in 1887–88 and scored two goals.

Lawton made his League debut on 13 October 1888, playing as a winger, in a 2–1 defeat to Bolton Wanderers at Pike's Lane. He scored his home debut seven days later against Burnley at the Victoria Ground; the score was 3–3 with three minutes of play left when Lawton scored the winner to make it 4–3. Lawton appeared in 13 of the 22 league matches played by Stoke in the 1888–89 season, scoring one league goal. As a winger (13 appearances), Lawton played in a Stoke midfield that achieved big wins (three League goals or more). Stoke finished bottom of the table, and Lawton joined Altrincham at the end of the season. In 1890 he moved from Altrincham to Belvedere.

== Career statistics ==
Appearances and goals by club, season and competition
Club	Season	League			FA Cup		Total	
Club	Season	Division	Apps	Goals	Apps	Goals	Apps	Goals
Stoke	1885–86	—	—		2	0	2	0
Burslem Port Vale	1886–87	—	—		0	0	0	0
Stoke	1887–88	—	—		4	2	4	2
Stoke	1888–89	The Football League	13	1	0	0	13	1
Career total			13	1	6	2	19	3
