= Wally Owen =

English footballer

Personal information
- Full name: Wallace Owen
- Date of birth: 1864
- Place of birth: Stoke-upon-Trent, England
- Position: Forward

Senior career*
| Years | Team | Apps | (Gls) |
- Stoke St Peter's
| 1886–1888 | Stoke | 0 | (0) |
- Long Eaton Rangers
- * Club domestic league appearances and goals

Wallace Owen (1864 – after 1888) was an English footballer who played for Stoke.

== Career ==
Owen started his career with Stoke St Peter's before joining Stoke in 1886. He became a useful forward and scored four goals in six FA Cup matches in two seasons for Stoke. With Stoke joining the Football League in June 1888, Owen instead moved on to the Combination with Long Eaton Rangers.

He may also have made one FA Cup and one Staffordshire Senior Cup appearance for Stoke's rivals Burslem Port Vale in October 1886. A forward named 'Owen' wore the number 8 shirt for the "Valeites" for two games and played as a forward, though his first name and history went unrecorded.

== Career statistics ==
Appearances and goals by club, season and competition
| Club | Season | FA Cup | | Total | |
| Club | Season | Apps | Goals | Apps | Goals |
|---|---|---|---|---|---|
| Stoke | 1886–87 | 2 | 1 | 2 | 1 |
| Stoke | 1887–88 | 4 | 3 | 4 | 3 |
| Career total | | 6 | 4 | 6 | 4 |
