= Thomas Moore (footballer) =

Scottish footballer

Personal information
- Full name: Thomas Moore
- Date of birth: 1864
- Place of birth: Arbroath, Scotland
- Date of death: before 1945
- Position: Centre forward

Senior career*
Years	Team	Apps	(Gls)
1887	Arbroath		
1888	Stoke	1	(0)
1889	Arbroath		
- * Club domestic league appearances and goals

Thomas Moore (born 1864 – died before 1945) was a Scottish footballer who played in the Football League for Stoke.

== Career ==
Moore was signed by his local side Arbroath in 1887. He moved south to England to join Stoke in August 1888. Moore made his Stoke and League debut, on 13 October 1888, at Pike's Lane the then home of Bolton Wanderers. Stoke lost 2–1. This was his only appearance for Stoke and he and returned to Arbroath in January 1889.

He died before 1945.

== Career statistics ==
Appearances and goals by club, season and competition
Club	Season	League			FA Cup		Total	
Club	Season	Division	Apps	Goals	Apps	Goals	Apps	Goals
Stoke	1888–89	The Football League	1	0	0	0	1	0
Career Total			1	0	0	0	1	0
