= Joe Copestake =

English footballer

Personal information
- Full name: Joseph Copestake
- Date of birth: 1859
- Place of birth: Stoke-upon-Trent, England
- Position: Forward

Senior career*
Years	Team	Apps	(Gls)
- Newcastle-Under-Lyme
1885–1886	Stoke		
- Stoke Town
- * Club domestic league appearances and goals

Joseph Copestake (born 1859) was an English footballer who played for Stoke.

== Career ==
Copestake played for Newcastle-Under-Lyme before joining Stoke in 1885. He played in both FA Cup matches in the 1885–86 season as Stoke lost to Crewe Alexandra in a replay. He left the club at the end of the season and joined Stoke Town.

== Career statistics ==
Appearances and goals by club, season and competition
Club	Season	FA Cup		Total	
Club	Season	Apps	Goals	Apps	Goals
Stoke	1885–86	2	0	2	0
Career total		2	0	2	0
