= 1885–86 Stoke F.C. season =

Stoke
1885–86 season
- Manager: Harry Lockett
- Stadium: Victoria Ground
- FA Cup: First Round
Home colours

The 1885–86 season was the third season Stoke took part the FA Cup.

== Season review ==
Stoke fared little better in the 1885–86 FA Cup again failing to go beyond the first round, losing to nearby Crewe Alexandra in a replay after extra time.

== FA Cup ==
Round	Date	Opponent	Venue	Result	Attendance	Scorers
R1	31 October 1885	Crewe Alexandra	H	2–2	2,000	Sayer, Shutt
R1 Replay	7 November 1885	Crewe Alexandra	A	0–1	2,000	

=== Squad statistics ===
Pos.	Name	FA Cup	
Pos.	Name	Apps	Goals
GK	(England) Percy Birch	2	0
FB	(England) Tommy Clare	2	0
FB	(Wales) Edgar Montford	2	0
HB	(England) Fred Bettany	2	0
HB	(England) Horace Brown	2	0
HB	(England) Elijah Smith	2	0
FW	(England) Joe Copestake	2	0
FW	(England) Alf Edge	2	0
FW	(England) George Lawton	2	0
FW	(England) Jimmy Sayer	2	1
FW	(England) George Shutt	2	1

== Staffordshire Senior Cup ==
Round	Opponent	Venue	Result
R1	Goldenhill	A	1–0
R2	Smallthorne	A	7–1
R3	Mitchell' St. George	H	1–1
R3 replay	Mitchell' St. George	H	2–0
Semi final	Walsall Town Swifts	H	3–1
Final	West Bromwich Albion	A	2–4
