= Stan Meakin =

English footballer

Personal information
- Full name: Stanley Meakin
- Date of birth: 1860
- Place of birth: Stoke-upon-Trent, England
- Position: Half-back

Senior career*
Years	Team	Apps	(Gls)
- Tunstall
1887–1888	Stoke		
- Burslem Swifts
- * Club domestic league appearances and goals

Stanley Meakin (1860 – unknown) was an English footballer who played for Stoke.

== Career ==
Meakin was born in Stoke-upon-Trent and played football with Tunstall before joining Stoke in 1887. He played once in FA Cup in the 1887–88 season which came in a 1–0 victory over local rivals Burslem Port Vale. He left Stoke at the end of the season and later played for Burslem Swifts.

== Career statistics ==
Club	Season	FA Cup		Total	
Club	Season	Apps	Goals	Apps	Goals
Stoke	1887–88	1	0	1	0
Career Total		1	0	1	0
