= Tom Wainwright =

English footballer

Personal information
- Full name: Thomas Wainwright
- Date of birth: 1860
- Place of birth: Stoke-upon-Trent, England
- Date of death: 1940 (aged 79–80)
- Place of death: Stoke-on-Trent, England
- Position: Inside forward

Senior career*
Years	Team	Apps	(Gls)
1887	Stoke St Jude's		
1888–1889	Stoke	1	(0)
1889	Stoke Priory		
- * Club domestic league appearances and goals

Thomas Wainwright (1860 – 1940) was an English footballer who played in the Football League for Stoke.

== Career ==
Wainwright was born in Stoke-upon-Trent and played for local church league side Stoke St Jude's before joining Stoke in 1888. He played his debut and only match in the Football League on the 15 September 1888, the second weekend of the 1888–89 season away at Wellington Road home of Aston Villa. Stoke lost the match 5–1. He was never selected for a league match again for Stoke but he did play and score in the FA Cup against Warwick County. However Stoke lost 2–1 and most of the side who played in that match were released and Wainwright joined Stoke Priory.

== Career statistics ==
Appearances and goals by club, season and competition
Club	Season	League			FA Cup		Total	
Club	Season	Division	Apps	Goals	Apps	Goals	Apps	Goals
Stoke	1888–89	The Football League	1	0	1	1	2	1
Career total			1	0	1	1	2	1
