= Joe Broadhurst =

English footballer

Personal information
- Full name: Joseph Broadhurst
- Date of birth: 1862
- Place of birth: Stoke-upon-Trent, England
- Position: Half back

Senior career*
Years	Team	Apps	(Gls)
- Leek
1887–1888	Stoke		
- Leek
- * Club domestic league appearances and goals

Joseph Broadhurst (1862 – after 1888) was an English footballer who played for Stoke.

== Career ==
Broadhurst was born in Stoke-upon-Trent and played football with Leek before joining Stoke in 1887. He played once in FA Cup in the 1887–88 season which came in a 4–1 defeat to West Bromwich Albion. He left Stoke at the end of the season returned to Leek.

== Career statistics ==
Appearances and goals by club, season and competition
Club	Season	FA Cup		Total	
Club	Season	Apps	Goals	Apps	Goals
Stoke	1887–88	1	0	1	0
Career total		1	0	1	0
