= John Tunnicliffe (footballer) =

English footballer

Personal information
- Full name: John Tunnicliffe
- Date of birth: 1866
- Place of birth: Hanley, England
- Position: Forward

Senior career*
Years	Team	Apps	(Gls)
1890	Longton Atlas		
1891–1892	Stoke	3	(0)
1892	Audlem		
- * Club domestic league appearances and goals

John Tunnicliffe (born 1866) was an English footballer who played in the Football League for Stoke. His brother Billy was also a footballer

== Career ==
Tunnicliffe was born in Hanley and played for Longton Atlas before joining Stoke in 1891. He played in three matches for Stoke during the 1891–92 season. He left the club at the end of the season and joined Audlem.

== Career statistics ==
Appearances and goals by club, season and competition
Club	Season	League			FA Cup		Total	
Club	Season	Division	Apps	Goals	Apps	Goals	Apps	Goals
Stoke	1891–92	The Football League	3	0	0	0	3	0
Career total			3	0	0	0	3	0
