= William Smalley (pioneer) =

Ohio settler

William Smalley (1759/1760 {1762[?]–1838) was an Ohio pioneer, who settled in the area of what is now Cowan Lake State Park in 1797. He and his brother were the first white settlers in the area and cleared many acres of land for a farm and built a double log cabin on the site – years later to build the first brick home in the county on the same land. They built a sawmill, a grist mill and a small distillery. They also formed Union Baptist Church that would meet in the mill. Smalley and his church were strict abolitionists and the church would divide over the issue. Smalley's wife Prudence Hoel is buried near the home site in an unmarked grave as is one of his daughters.

== Life ==
He was born in 1759 or 1760 in New Jersey. The Smalley family moved to Western Pennsylvania in 1764 near Pittsburgh. At the age of 16 Smalley was abducted by a band of Lenape Indians while he was standing guard over the pioneer farmer's fields near Fort Pitt.

While held prisoner, Smalley witnessed the death of his father and other settlers at the hands of the Lenape. He was taken to an Indian village on the Maumee River. He lived with the Lenape in for five years and became accustomed to the ways of the Lenape, learning both their language and how to survive in the forests of Ohio. He later served an envoy for the Lenape with French and English fur traders. Following a successful negotiations with a group of traders, Smalley was released from the custody of the Lenape in about 1781.

Soon after his release Smalley got married and settled near Cincinnati. He served as a scout and guide for various U.S. Army generals in the Northwest Territory. While serving in this capacity he was once again captured by the Lenape. Smalley was able to escape after a year and seven months. He returned to his family for a short time before being hired by General Anthony Wayne to serve as a guide and interpreter. Smalley remained in the Army with General Wayne until after the Treaty of Greenville when he was discharged.

In 1797 Smalley settled one mile west of Clarksville, Ohio in on the bank of Todd's Fork in Warren County. Smalley had 10 children, six sons and four daughters. His wife died in 1824, and was buried at Clarksville. He later remarried. After farming for 30 years, Smalley sold his Ohio farm and moved to Illinois, where he died in 1838.
