= Bill Smalley =

English footballer

Personal information
- Full name: William Smalley
- Date of birth: 1864
- Place of birth: Darwen, England
- Date of death: 1912 (aged 48)
- Position: Forward

Senior career*
| Years | Team | Apps | (Gls) |
| 1888–1889 | Preston North End | 0 | (0) |
| 1888 | → Stoke (loan) | 1 | (0) |
- * Club domestic league appearances and goals

William Smalley (1864–1912) was an English footballer who played in the Football League for Stoke.

== Career ==
Smalley was born in Darwen and was on the books of Preston North End's reserve team but had not played for the first–team. When Stoke went to Deepdale, the home of Preston North End on 6 October 1888 they were missing two players who failed to board the train the morning so Preston lent them Smalley and fellow reserve team player Alfred Dempsey. The visitors were overwhelmed in a 7–0 defeat and Smalley never played first–team football again. Smalley' brother Robert Smalley played in goal for Everton.

== Career statistics ==
| Club | Season | League | | | FA Cup | | Total | |
| Club | Season | Division | Apps | Goals | Apps | Goals | Apps | Goals |
|---|---|---|---|---|---|---|---|---|
| Preston North End | 1888–89 | The Football League | 0 | 0 | 0 | 0 | 0 | 0 |
| Stoke (loan) | 1888–89 | The Football League | 1 | 0 | 0 | 0 | 1 | 0 |
| Career Total | | | 1 | 0 | 0 | 0 | 1 | 0 |
