= Richard Chadwick (footballer) =

English footballer

Personal information
- Full name: Richard Chadwick
- Date of birth: 1860
- Place of birth: Stoke-upon-Trent, England
- Position: Half back

Senior career*
Years	Team	Apps	(Gls)
- Church Football
1886–1887	Stoke		
- Longon Albion
- * Club domestic league appearances and goals

Richard Chadwick (1860 – unknown) was an English footballer who played for Stoke.

== Career ==
Chadwick was born in Stoke-upon-Trent and played in the local church league before joining Stoke in 1886. He played once in FA Cup in the 1886–87 season which came in a 10–1 victory over Caernarfon Wanderers. At the end of the season Chadwick re-entered church league football with Longon Albion.

== Career statistics ==
Appearances and goals by club, season and competition
Club	Season	FA Cup		Total	
Club	Season	Apps	Goals	Apps	Goals
Stoke	1886–87	1	0	1	0
Career total		1	0	1	0
