= 1888–89 Rangers F.C. season =

Rangers
1888–89 season
- President: James Watson
- Match Secretary: James Gossland
- Ground: Ibrox Park
- Scottish Cup: Second round

The 1888–89 season was the 15th season of competitive football by Rangers.

== Overview ==
Rangers played a total of 3 competitive matches during the 1888–89 season.

== Results ==
All results are written with Rangers' score first.

=== Scottish Cup ===
Date	Round	Opponent	Venue	Result	Attendance	Scorers
1 September 1888	R1	Partick Thistle	H	4–2		
22 September 1888	R2	Clyde	A	2–2		
29 September 1888	R2 R	Clyde	H	2–3		

== See also ==
- 1888–89 in Scottish football
- 1888–89 Scottish Cup
