= Billy Tunnicliffe (footballer, born 1864) =

English footballer

Personal information
- Full name: William Tunnicliffe
- Date of birth: 1864
- Place of birth: Hanley, England
- Position: Left winger

Senior career*
Years	Team	Apps	(Gls)
1887	Hanley Town		
1888–1889	Stoke	8	(4)
1889	Middlewich		
- * Club domestic league appearances and goals

William Tunicliffe (born 1864) was an English footballer who played in the Football League for Stoke. His brother John was also a footballer.

== Career ==
Tunnicliffe was born in Hanley, Stoke-upon-Trent and played for Hanley Town before joining Stoke in 1888. He made his League debut on 8 September 1888, as a winger for Stoke in a 2–0 defeat by West Bromwich Albion at the Victoria Ground. He played in nine matches for Stoke during the first season of the Football League where he scored four goals with two braces against Burnley and Notts County. He left the club at the end of the season and joined Middlewich.

== Career statistics ==
Appearances and goals by club, season and competition
Club	Season	League			FA Cup		Total	
Club	Season	Division	Apps	Goals	Apps	Goals	Apps	Goals
Stoke	1888–89	The Football League	8	4	1	0	9	4
Career total			8	4	1	0	9	4
