= Cowan Lake State Park =

Park in Ohio, U.S.

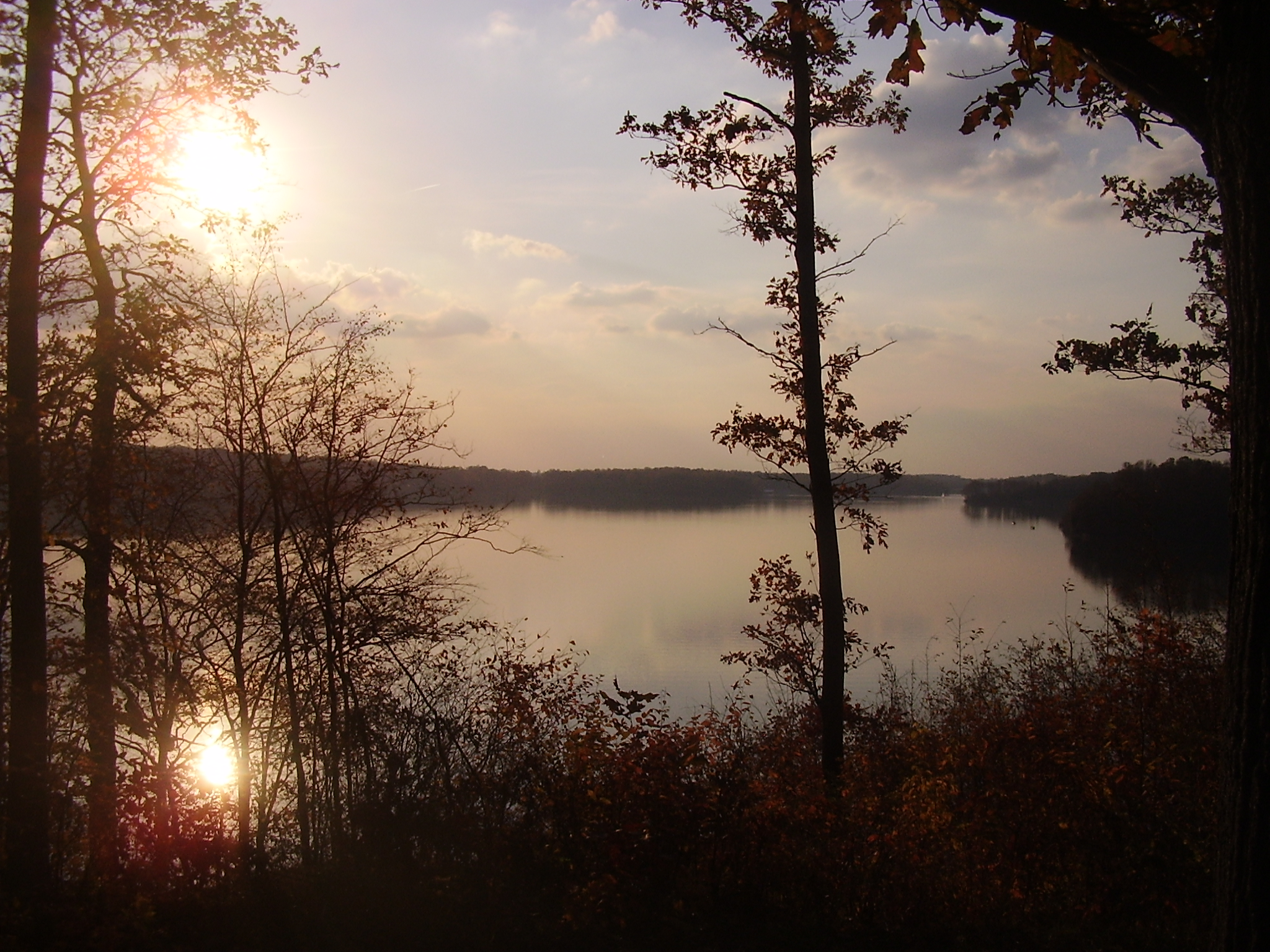
- Sunset on Cowan Lake

- Location within Ohio Location within the United States
- Location: Clinton County, Ohio, United States
- Coordinates: 39°23′20″N 83°54′18″W
- Area: Land: 1,075 acres (435 ha); Water: 700 acres (280 ha)
- Elevation: 958 ft (292 m)
- Established: 1968
- Administrator: Ohio Department of Natural Resources
- Designation: Ohio state park
- Website: Cowan Lake State Park

Cowan Lake State Park is a 1,075-acre (435 ha) public recreation area in Clinton County, Ohio, in the United States. It is operated by the Ohio Department of Natural Resources. The state park is open for year-round recreation and is known for a variety of birds that attract birdwatching enthusiasts to the park in southwestern Ohio.

== History ==
What is now Cowan Lake State Park was once home to the Miami and Shawnee Indians. The Battle of Fallen Timbers in 1794 resulted in the opening of the land to American settlement. The first settler in the area was William Smalley. Smalley had previously been held captive by the Lenape. His language skills and knowledge of the land left him ideally suited to be among the pioneers in settling what became Clinton County, Ohio.

Cowan Creek, named for pioneer surveyor John Cowan, was dammed in 1950. The creation of Cowan Lake led to the establishment of Cowan Lake State Park in 1968. Its surface area is 695 acres (281 ha).

== Geology and ecology ==
Cowan Lake State Park lies atop limestone that is laden with fossils. The fossilized plants and animals attract attention from both professional and amateur paleontologists. Much of what is now Ohio was covered by massive inland seas and lakes such as Lake Maumee. As the Appalachian Mountains were formed, the limestone that was once the sea floor was pushed to the surface.

Cowan Lake is surrounded by a deciduous forest of beech and maple trees. The combination of lake and forest makes the park a destination for birders, who can observe mallards, American wigeons, mergansers, great blue and green-backed herons, killdeer, eastern bluebirds, catbirds, and many other species of birds. The most common mammals at the park are groundhogs, skunks, raccoons, and opossums.

Other plant life found at the park include bloodroot, wild ginger, and American lotus. The lotus is a water lily that thrives in the shallow waters of Cowan Lake. The leaves of the plant are quite large with yellow flowers.

== Recreation ==
The park offers picnic areas, pavilions, four miles of hiking trails, cottages, campsites, boating, swimming, fishing, and marina. Common game fish in Cowan Lake are muskellunge, crappie, largemouth bass, and bluegill.
