= Cowan Lake (Ohio) =

- Cowan Creek Reservoir
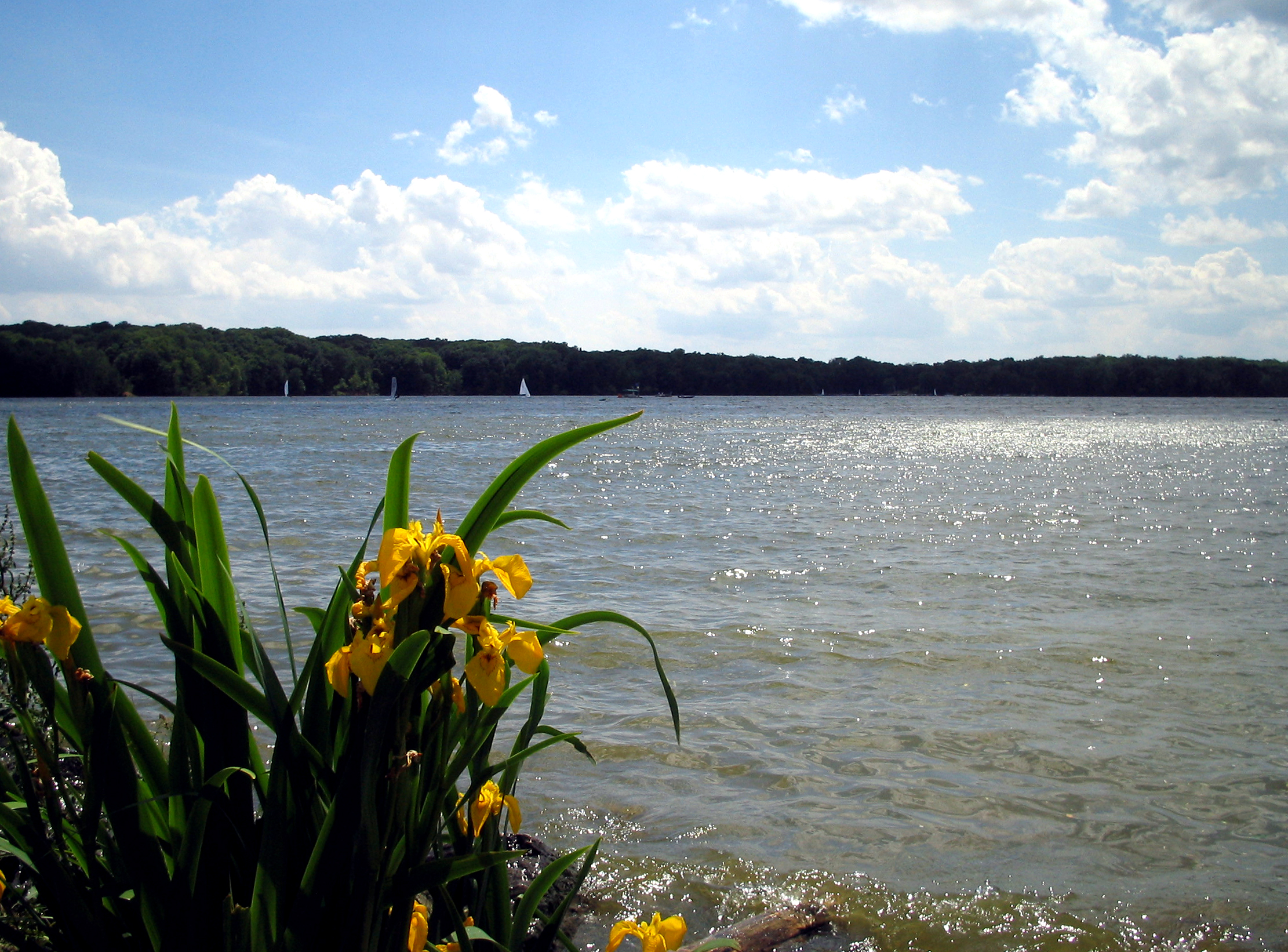

- Location within Ohio Location within the United States
- Location: Cowan Lake State Park, Clinton County, Ohio
- Coordinates: 39°23′19″N 83°55′29″W
- Type: Reservoir
- Primary inflows: Cowan Creek
- Primary outflows: Cowan Creek
- Catchment area: 32,640 acres (13,210 ha)
- Basin countries: United States
- Surface area: 692 acres (280 ha)
- Max. depth: 42 ft (13 m)
- Surface elevation: 965 feet (294 m)
- Islands: 1 (Austin Island)

Cowan Lake, also known as Cowan Creek Reservoir, is a lake within Cowan Lake State Park in Clinton County, Ohio, United States. Its surface area is 692 acres (2.80 km^{2}). Cowan Lake lies near the Cincinnati Arch, an uplifting of bedrock that occurred during the Appalachian Mountains' building process. The erosion of this arch in the Cowan region exposes fossil-rich limestone. The limestone near Cowan and other parts of the exposed arch are some of the most famous fossil hunting fields in the world.

The lake takes its name from Cowan Creek, the creek that was dammed in 1950 to form the lake. Its source is at 39°24′12″N 83°41′18″W. Cowan Creek was named for John Cowan, the first surveyor of the area.

Cowan Lake State Park, which includes the lakes and its immediate surroundings, was dedicated in 1968.
