= 1884–85 Stoke F.C. season =

Stoke
1884–85 season
- Manager: Harry Lockett
- Stadium: Victoria Ground
- FA Cup: First Round
Home colours

The 1884–85 season was the second season Stoke took part in the FA Cup; they, however, withdrew at the first round.

== Season review ==
Stoke were drawn to play Scottish side Queens Park away; however, the directors were unhappy about having to pay the full travel costs and so decided to withdraw from the match.

== FA Cup ==
Round	Date	Opponent	Venue	Result
R1	11 October 1884	Queens Park	A	Stoke withdrew from match

== Staffordshire Senior Cup ==
Round	Opponent	Venue	Result
R1	Fenton	H	12–0
R2	West Bromwich Albion	H	2–6
