= Warwick County F.C. =

Football club in Birmingham, England

Warwick County
- Full name: Warwick County Football Club
- Nickname: the County
- Founded: 1887
- Dissolved: April 1891
- Ground: Edgbaston
- Chairman: Lord Clevedon
Home colours

Warwick County F.C. was the association football division of Warwickshire County Cricket Club.

== History ==
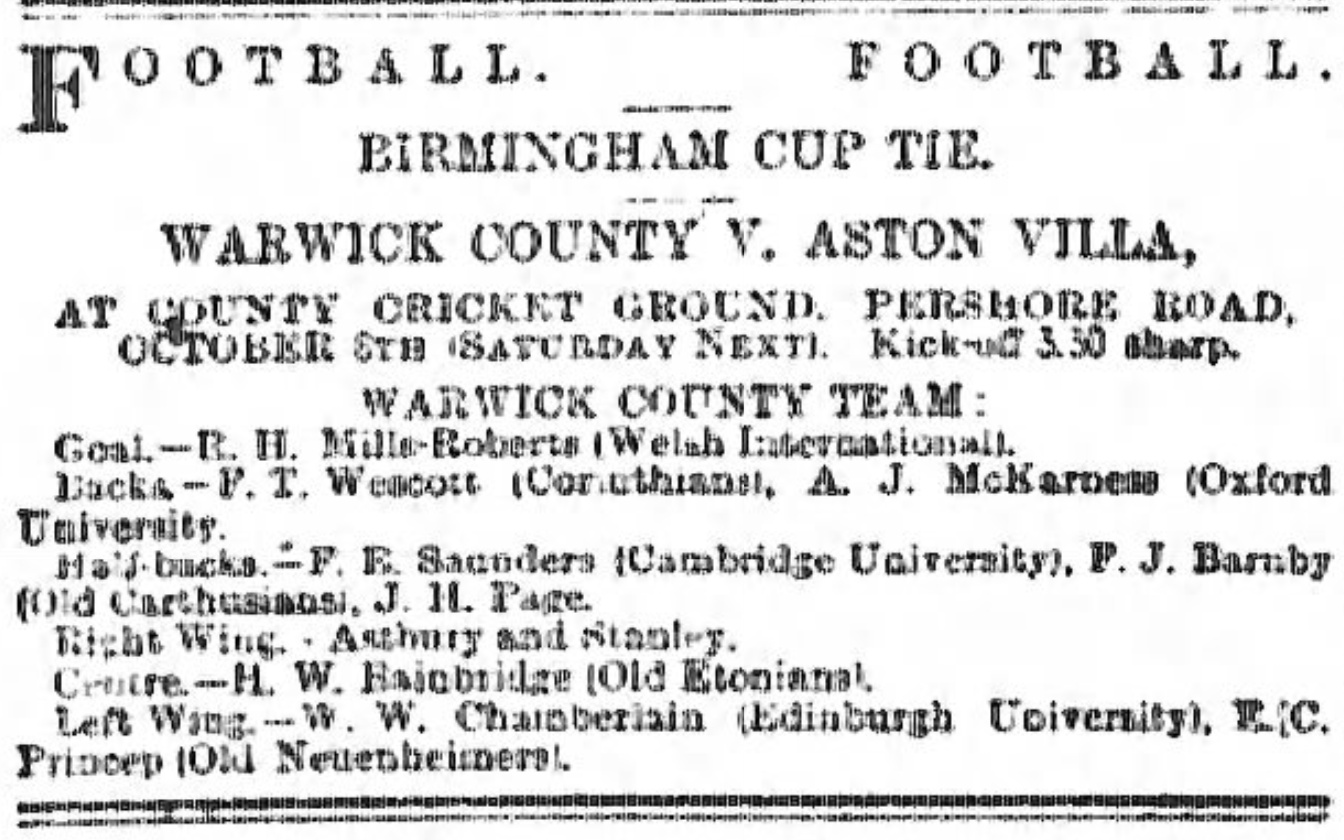
Advert for the Warwick County v Aston Villa tie in the Birmingham Senior Cup, Birmingham Mail, 7 October 1887

Following the examples of Notts County and Derby County, both of which were, in origin, county cricket clubs, the Warwickshire CCC decided to start up a football division in 1887, playing at the Edgbaston ground during the winter, and receiving heavy backing from the Ansells brewery, which hinted at offering sinecure jobs for quasi-professional players. However, whereas Notts had a clean slate, and Derbyshire only had works or school sides with which to compete, by 1887 the Birmingham football scene was fully mature, with Aston Villa, West Bromwich Albion, Birmingham St George's, and Small Heath Alliance all being professional clubs with strong fanbases. Consequently, despite the resources of the cricket club, County failed to gain a foothold, with "good gates" being elusive, and the media "always asserted that the venture was a hopeless one".

Further, the name caused confusion, with a number of county football associations assuming the club was the representative club of the Warwickshire Football Association (an organization which did not exist) and inviting it to play representative fixtures.

The first competitive game the club played was in the Birmingham Senior Cup in 1887–88, losing 11–0 at home to Aston Villa, albeit in front of 5,000 spectators. Nevertheless, this showed the impossibility the new club faced in bridging the gap. In fact, in its four entries to the local competition, it only reached the second round once. The club's committee acknowledged this, and the club was the instigator for the new Warwickshire Association, to provide the club with less daunting competitive fixtures.

=== FA Cup ===
One week after the club's Birmingham Senior Cup debut, the club made its FA Cup debut, being drawn to play Birmingham Excelsior at home. Excelsior was a second-rank side in the town but easily won 4–1, the County goal being an own goal by Lovesey. Despite Lovesey's gift, the Football Association ordered a replay, on the basis that Lovesey did not appear on the list of professional players; it later turned out that Excelsior had sent the appropriate papers and it was an FA clerical error that had not included Lovesey's name on the list those eligible to play. It did County no good - Excelsior won the replay 5–0.

The club entered the Cup for the next three seasons. In the first qualifying round of 1888–89, the club, scored a notable shock by beating Stoke 2–1; the first example of a non-league team beating a Football League team. However, the county was not facing the Stoke first team, as League commitments required the Potters to play at Preston North End, so the match was against Stoke's reserve side Stoke Swifts - albeit supplemented by four first team men, supposedly to guarantee Stoke's progression into the next round. The 1888-89 competition marked the county's best Cup run, the club beating Aston Shakespeare F.C. after knocking out Stoke. The run ended at the third qualifying round, County losing 5–1 at Burton Wanderers, who in turn went down 9–0 to County's closest geographical rivals (Small Heath).

=== Midland League and Warwickshire Cup success ===
In 1889–90, the club was a founder member of the Midland League. It had recruited heavily, with the new Warwickshire Association's representative side to face Manchester including three County players, plus five from Small Heath and three from Birmingham St George's, and winger Gray selected for the much more prestigious Birmingham and District side at the end of the season.

The club finished 6th out of 11 in its first season, with crowds usually around 1,000, and finished the year on a high note, beating champions Lincoln City 5–2, and sharing the Warwickshire Cup with Small Heath. The competition however was rather low-key, with only 10 entries, and County, Small Heath, and St George's all exempted to the semi-final stage. In the semi-final, St George's fielded a reserve side against County, who duly won 5–1.

Further, the final, at the County Ground, ended in acrimony, with one player from each side ordered off for fighting; neither side put out a first team, and, with the match ending in a 1–1 draw, and the football season over, it was decided that the clubs would share the trophy.

=== Final season ===
County was described at the end of the 1889–90 season as the most improved club in the Midlands; however, with many other local clubs being part of more prestigious leagues, the club's backers found it pointless to keep putting in money, and a number of "imported" players left, leaving the club reliant on local players. Two imported players - James Paten and James Cowan - had been recruited from Vale of Leven on the understanding that they would play for the club, but be employed by a "horse-clipping" business run by County secretary Charles Brown, in order to avoid the restrictions on imported professionals. At the start of the 1890–91 season, both left for Aston Villa, on the basis that the contracts did not force them to play football for County.

The club's second season in the League was its last; by March it was "in a bad way pecuniarily" and, despite the efforts of the club, which included hosting three matches at the same time at the County Ground, the club lost £150 in the season.

The club did at least win a tie in the Birmingham Senior Cup, albeit against a Walsall Town Swifts reserve side as the first team was playing in the Walsall Cup; Walsall had also been disappointed by having to re-play the tie, having beaten the County 6–5 after extra time, but the Birmingham FA committee upheld a protest that the extra half-an-hour was played in the dark. In the second round, the County lost 6–0 to West Bromwich Albion.

In April 1891, with the club having registered just 8 points in 13 Midland League matches, being bottom of the table, and with many fixtures left unfulfilled, it was obvious the club was moribund. After a 4–0 defeat at Burton Wanderers on 4 April 1891, the club threw in the towel; the Midland League expelled the defunct club and expunged its fixtures.

The club never had a chance of succeeding; gates were difficult to obtain, valuable money was squandered at the outset, and the fabulous prices demanded by first-class players prevented the County obtaining the services of many really capable men. The venture was an ill-starred one; we warned the promoters of the difficulties they would have to encounter at the start, and our dismal forebodings have been fully borne out.

== Colours ==
The club originally played in white and dark blue (probably as white shirts and blue serge knicks), and later described its colours as blue and white, photographic evidence suggesting the white was a yoke on the shirts.

== Ground ==
The club played at Edgbaston, and, in 1890, with a view to increasing entrance money, it encouraged junior side Aston Victoria to move in, so that senior and junior games could be played simultaneously (the cricket pitch being able to host three games simultaneously), albeit one motive was said to be in order to encourage some of the Little Vics to join County. The experiment did not work as the Vics (now called County Victoria) attracted no interest - less even than the Old Edwardians rugby union side which also was invited to play there.

== Notable players ==
- Billy Rose, who left the club for Wolverhampton Wanderers and later kept goal for England.
- Charlie Hare, who played for the club in its Midland League seasons
- George Hollis. Fred Wilkes, and Billy Ollis, who played for the club in 1890–91 and joined Small Heath on the county's dissolution
- Herbert Bainbridge, first class cricketer and former F A Cup finalist.
- Notable players ( 10 )
