= Harry Lockett =

English football manager (1855–1930)

Personal information
- Full name: Harold Lockett
- Date of birth: 1855
- Place of birth: Stoke-upon-Trent, England
- Date of death: 1930 (aged 74–75)

Managerial career
- Years: Team
- 1884–1890: Stoke

Harold Lockett (1855–1930) was an English association football manager and administrator.

== Career ==
Lockett was born in Stoke-upon-Trent and was appointed manager-secretary of Stoke in 1884 replacing Walter Cox. He was Stoke manager when professionalism was introduced in August 1885, agreeing to pay his players, half-a-crown (13p) a week. However following a threat of strike action amongst the players when the club wished to introduce different pay levels, it was increased to five shillings (25p).

A football season at this time consisted of numerous friendly matches and the eagerly anticipated FA Cup and the Staffordshire Senior Cup. However once a team has been knocked out of the cup there was little excitement for players and supporters and so a league format was advocated by the chairman of Aston Villa, William McGregor and in the spring of 1888 the Football League was formed with McGregor as its first president. Lockett represented Stoke at the meeting in Anderton's Hall Hotel, London and was successful as three weeks later Stoke joined the league and Lockett was appointed as the league's first secretary.

Stoke's first season in league football didn't go well at all and the team had the misfortune to finish bottom of the table, albeit on goal-average after only winning four of their 22 matches. The following season was even worse with Stoke again taking bottom spot and suffered a number of heavy defeats most notably the club's record loss, 10–0 against Preston North End. This time Stoke failed to gain re-election and their place was taken by Sunderland and Stoke joined the Football Alliance. Lockett then decided to relinquish his position at Stoke to concentrate on his time-consuming position with the Football League, where he stayed until 1902.

In 1890 he was appointed Administrator of Stoke baseball club, for the upcoming professional 1890 National League of Baseball of Great Britain.

== Managerial statistics ==
Managerial record by team and tenure
Team	From	To	Record				
Team	From	To	P	W	D	L	Win %
Stoke	April 1884	August 1890	55	13	9	33	23.6
Total			55	13	9	33	23.6
